= List of Billboard Christian Songs number ones of the 2020s =

The Hot Christian Songs is a record chart compiled and published by Billboard that measures the top-performing contemporary Christian music songs in the United States. The data was compiled by Nielsen Broadcast Data Systems based on the weekly audience impressions of each song played on contemporary Christian radio stations until the end of November 2013. With the Billboard issue dated December 7, 2013, the Christian Songs chart began utilizing the same methodology used for the Hot 100 chart to compile its rankings by measuring the airplay of Christian songs across all radio formats, while incorporating data from digital sales and streaming activity. Christian Airplay, which began being published in 2013, is based solely on Christian radio airplay, a methodology that had previously been used from 2003 to 2013 for Hot Christian Songs.

== Number-one songs ==
Key
No.	nth single to top the chart
re	Return of a song to No. 1
†	No. 1 song of the year

=== Hot Christian Songs ===
No.	Week	Artist	Single	Ref.	No.	Artist	Airplay Single	Ref.
2020
re	January 4	Lauren Daigle	"You Say"†		142	Casting Crowns featuring Matthew West	"Nobody"	
re	January 11	Lauren Daigle	"You Say"†		142	Casting Crowns featuring Matthew West	"Nobody"	
re	January 18	Lauren Daigle	"You Say"†		143	For King & Country	"Burn the Ships"	
re	January 25	Lauren Daigle	"You Say"†		143	For King & Country	"Burn the Ships"	
re	February 1	Lauren Daigle	"You Say"†		143	For King & Country	"Burn the Ships"	
re	February 8	Lauren Daigle	"You Say"†		143	For King & Country	"Burn the Ships"	
re	February 15	Lauren Daigle	"You Say"†		143	For King & Country	"Burn the Ships"	
re	February 22	Lauren Daigle	"You Say"†		144	MercyMe	"Almost Home"	
re	February 29	Lauren Daigle	"You Say"†		145	Matthew West	"The God Who Stays"	
re	March 7	Lauren Daigle	"You Say"†		145	Matthew West	"The God Who Stays"	
re	March 14	Lauren Daigle	"You Say"†		146	We the Kingdom	"Holy Water"†	
re	March 21	Lauren Daigle	"You Say"†		146	We the Kingdom	"Holy Water"†	
re	March 28	Lauren Daigle	"You Say"†		146	We the Kingdom	"Holy Water"†	
re	April 4	Lauren Daigle	"You Say"†		146	We the Kingdom	"Holy Water"†	
re	April 11	Lauren Daigle	"You Say"†		re	MercyMe	"Almost Home"	
re	April 18	Lauren Daigle	"You Say"†		re	MercyMe	"Almost Home"	
re	April 25	Lauren Daigle	"You Say"†		147	Big Daddy Weave	"I Know"	
re	May 2	Lauren Daigle	"You Say"†		147	Big Daddy Weave	"I Know"	
re	May 9	Lauren Daigle	"You Say"†		147	Big Daddy Weave	"I Know"	
re	May 16	Lauren Daigle	"You Say"†		148	Michael W. Smith featuring Vanessa Campagna and Madelyn Berry	"Waymaker"	
re	May 23	Lauren Daigle	"You Say"†		148	Michael W. Smith featuring Vanessa Campagna and Madelyn Berry	"Waymaker"	
re	May 30	Lauren Daigle	"You Say"†		148	Michael W. Smith featuring Vanessa Campagna and Madelyn Berry	"Waymaker"	
re	June 6	Lauren Daigle	"You Say"†		149	Cory Asbury	"The Father's House"	
re	June 13	Lauren Daigle	"You Say"†		149	Cory Asbury	"The Father's House"	
re	June 20	Lauren Daigle	"You Say"†		149	Cory Asbury	"The Father's House"	
re	June 27	Lauren Daigle	"You Say"†		150	Matt Maher featuring Elle Limebear	"Alive & Breathing"	
re	July 4	Lauren Daigle	"You Say"†		150	Matt Maher featuring Elle Limebear	"Alive & Breathing"	
111	July 11	Kanye West featuring Travis Scott	"Wash Us in the Blood"		150	Matt Maher featuring Elle Limebear	"Alive & Breathing"	
111	July 18	Kanye West featuring Travis Scott	"Wash Us in the Blood"		150	Matt Maher featuring Elle Limebear	"Alive & Breathing"	
re	July 25	Lauren Daigle	"You Say"†		151	Jeremy Camp	"Keep Me in the Moment"	
re	August 1	Lauren Daigle	"You Say"†		152	For King & Country, Kirk Franklin and Tori Kelly	"Together"	
re	August 8	Lauren Daigle	"You Say"†		152	For King & Country, Kirk Franklin and Tori Kelly	"Together"	
re	August 15	Lauren Daigle	"You Say"†		re	Jeremy Camp	"Keep Me in the Moment"	
re	August 22	Lauren Daigle	"You Say"†		re	For King & Country, Kirk Franklin and Tori Kelly	"Together"	
re	August 29	Lauren Daigle	"You Say"†		re	For King & Country, Kirk Franklin and Tori Kelly	"Together"	
re	September 5	Lauren Daigle	"You Say"†		re	For King & Country, Kirk Franklin and Tori Kelly	"Together"	
re	September 12	Lauren Daigle	"You Say"†		153	Zach Williams and Dolly Parton	"There Was Jesus"	
re	September 19	Lauren Daigle	"You Say"†		153	Zach Williams and Dolly Parton	"There Was Jesus"	
re	September 26	Lauren Daigle	"You Say"†		153	Zach Williams and Dolly Parton	"There Was Jesus"	
re	October 3	Lauren Daigle	"You Say"†		153	Zach Williams and Dolly Parton	"There Was Jesus"	
re	October 10	Lauren Daigle	"You Say"†		153	Zach Williams and Dolly Parton	"There Was Jesus"	
re	October 17	Lauren Daigle	"You Say"†		154	We the Kingdom	"God So Loved"	
re	October 24	Lauren Daigle	"You Say"†		155	Chris Tomlin featuring Lady A	"Who You Are to Me"	
re	October 31	Lauren Daigle	"You Say"†		155	Chris Tomlin featuring Lady A	"Who You Are to Me"	
re	November 7	Lauren Daigle	"You Say"†		155	Chris Tomlin featuring Lady A	"Who You Are to Me"	
re	November 14	Lauren Daigle	"You Say"†		155	Chris Tomlin featuring Lady A	"Who You Are to Me"	
re	November 21	Lauren Daigle	"You Say"†		155	Chris Tomlin featuring Lady A	"Who You Are to Me"	
re	November 28	Lauren Daigle	"You Say"†		155	Chris Tomlin featuring Lady A	"Who You Are to Me"	
re	December 5	Lauren Daigle	"You Say"†		156	Cain	"Rise Up (Lazarus)"	
112	December 12	Carrie Underwood	"Favorite Time of Year"		156	Cain	"Rise Up (Lazarus)"	
112	December 19	Carrie Underwood	"Favorite Time of Year"		re	We the Kingdom	"God So Loved"	
113	December 26	Carrie Underwood and John Legend	"Hallelujah"		157	for King & Country featuring Needtobreathe	"O Come O Come Emmanuel"	
2021
113	January 2	Carrie Underwood and John Legend	"Hallelujah"		157	for King & Country featuring Needtobreathe	"O Come O Come Emmanuel"	
113	January 9	Carrie Underwood and John Legend	"Hallelujah"		re	Cain	"Rise Up (Lazarus)"	
re	January 16	Lauren Daigle	"You Say"		re	Cain	"Rise Up (Lazarus)"	
re	January 23	Lauren Daigle	"You Say"		158	Tauren Wells featuring Jenn Johnson	"Famous For (I Believe)"	
re	January 30	Lauren Daigle	"You Say"		159	Matthew West	"Truth Be Told"	
114	February 6	Elevation Worship featuring Brandon Lake	"Grave into Gardens"		160	Elevation Worship featuring Brandon Lake	"Graves into Gardens"	
114	February 13	Elevation Worship featuring Brandon Lake	"Grave into Gardens"		re	Matthew West	"Truth Be Told"	
re	February 20	Lauren Daigle	"You Say"		re	Matthew West	"Truth Be Told"	
re	February 27	Lauren Daigle	"You Say"		re	Matthew West	"Truth Be Told"	
re	March 6	Lauren Daigle	"You Say"		161	Andrew Ripp	"Jericho"	
re	March 13	Lauren Daigle	"You Say"		re	Matthew West	"Truth Be Told"	
re	March 20	Lauren Daigle	"You Say"		162	Jeremy Camp	"Out of My Hands"	
re	March 27	Lauren Daigle	"You Say"		162	Jeremy Camp	"Out of My Hands"	
re	April 3	Lauren Daigle	"You Say"		162	Jeremy Camp	"Out of My Hands"	
re	April 10	Lauren Daigle	"You Say"		163	Phil Wickham	"Battle Belongs"	
re	April 17	Lauren Daigle	"You Say"		163	Phil Wickham	"Battle Belongs"	
115	April 24	Crowder	"Good God Almighty"		163	Phil Wickham	"Battle Belongs"	
re	May 1	Lauren Daigle	"You Say"		163	Phil Wickham	"Battle Belongs"	
re	May 8	Lauren Daigle	"You Say"		164	Zach Williams	"Less Like Me"	
re	May 15	Lauren Daigle	"You Say"		165	Crowder	"Good God Almighty"†	
re	May 22	Lauren Daigle	"You Say"		165	Crowder	"Good God Almighty"†	
re	May 29	Crowder	"Good God Almighty"		165	Crowder	"Good God Almighty"†	
116	June 5	Lauren Daigle	"Hold On To Me"		165	Crowder	"Good God Almighty"†	
re	June 12	Lauren Daigle	"You Say"		165	Crowder	"Good God Almighty"†	
re	June 19	Crowder	"Good God Almighty"		166	TobyMac	"Help Is on the Way (Maybe Midnight)"	
re	June 26	Crowder	"Good God Almighty"		166	TobyMac	"Help Is on the Way (Maybe Midnight)"	
re	July 3	Crowder	"Good God Almighty"		167	For King & Country	"Amen"	
re	July 10	Lauren Daigle	"Hold On to Me"		re	TobyMac	"Help Is On the Way (Maybe Midnight)"	
re	July 17	Lauren Daigle	"Hold On to Me"		re	TobyMac	"Help Is On the Way (Maybe Midnight)"	
re	July 24	Lauren Daigle	"Hold On to Me"		re	TobyMac	"Help Is On the Way (Maybe Midnight)"	
re	July 31	Lauren Daigle	"You Say"		168	Cain	"Yes He Can"	
re	August 7	Lauren Daigle	"You Say"		168	Cain	"Yes He Can"	
117	August 14	Anne Wilson	"My Jesus"		168	Cain	"Yes He Can"	
117	August 21	Anne Wilson	"My Jesus"		168	Cain	"Yes He Can"	
117	August 28	Anne Wilson	"My Jesus"		169	Anne Wilson	"My Jesus"	
117	September 4	Anne Wilson	"My Jesus"		169	Anne Wilson	"My Jesus"	
118	September 12	Kanye West	"Hurricane"		169	Anne Wilson	"My Jesus"	
118	September 18	Kanye West	"Hurricane"		170	Elevation Worship	"Rattle!"	
118	September 25	Kanye West	"Hurricane"		re	Anne Wilson	"My Jesus"	
118	October 2	Kanye West	"Hurricane"		re	Anne Wilson	"My Jesus"	
118	October 9	Kanye West	"Hurricane"		re	Anne Wilson	"My Jesus"	
118	October 16	Kanye West	"Hurricane"		171	Phil Wickham	"House of the Lord"	
118	October 23	Kanye West	"Hurricane"		171	Phil Wickham	"House of the Lord"	
118	October 30	Kanye West	"Hurricane"		171	Phil Wickham	"House of the Lord"	
118	November 6	Kanye West	"Hurricane"		172	Matthew West	"What If"	
118	November 13	Kanye West	"Hurricane"		172	Matthew West	"What If"	
118	November 20	Kanye West	"Hurricane"		172	Matthew West	"What If"	
118	November 27	Kanye West	"Hurricane"		172	Matthew West	"What If"	
119	December 4	Kanye West	"Praise God"		173	Tasha Layton	"Look What You've Done"	
119	December 11	Kanye West	"Praise God"		174	For King & Country	"Relate"	
119	December 18	Kanye West	"Praise God"		174	For King & Country	"Relate"	
119	December 25	Kanye West	"Praise God"		175	Maverick City Music featuring Joe L. Barnes and Naomi Raine	"Promises"	
2022
119	January 1	Kanye West	"Praise God"		176	Anne Wilson	"I Still Believe in Christmas"	
119	January 8	Kanye West	"Praise God"		re	Phil Wickham	"House of the Lord"	
120	January 15	Maverick City Music featuring Joe L. Barnes and Naomi Raine	"Promises"		re	Maverick City Music featuring Joe L. Barnes and Naomi Raine	"Promises"	
120	January 22	Maverick City Music featuring Joe L. Barnes and Naomi Raine	"Promises"		re	Maverick City Music featuring Joe L. Barnes and Naomi Raine	"Promises"	
121	January 29	Phil Wickham	"House of the Lord"		177	We Are Messengers	"Come What May"	
121	February 5	Phil Wickham	"House of the Lord"		177	We Are Messengers	"Come What May"	
122	February 12	For King & Country	"Relate"		177	We Are Messengers	"Come What May"	
122	February 19	For King & Country	"Relate"		177	We Are Messengers	"Come What May"	
122	February 26	For King & Country	"Relate"		178	Crowder	"In the House"	
re	March 5	Kanye West	"Praise God"		178	Crowder	"In the House"	
123	March 12	Crowder	"In the House"		178	Crowder	"In the House"	
123	March 19	Crowder	"In the House"		178	Crowder	"In the House"	
124	March 26	Katy Nichole	"In Jesus Name (God of Possible)"†		178	Crowder	"In the House"	
124	April 2	Katy Nichole	"In Jesus Name (God of Possible)"†		179	Jordan St. Cyr	"Weary Traveler"	
124	April 9	Katy Nichole	"In Jesus Name (God of Possible)"†		180	Jordan Feliz, Jonathan Traylor & Mandisa	"Jesus is Coming Back"	
124	April 16	Katy Nichole	"In Jesus Name (God of Possible)"†		180	Jordan Feliz, Jonathan Traylor & Mandisa	"Jesus is Coming Back"	
124	April 23	Katy Nichole	"In Jesus Name (God of Possible)"†		180	Jordan Feliz, Jonathan Traylor & Mandisa	"Jesus is Coming Back"	
124	April 30	Katy Nichole	"In Jesus Name (God of Possible)"†		181	Katy Nichole	"In Jesus Name (God of Possible)"†	
124	May 7	Katy Nichole	"In Jesus Name (God of Possible)"†		181	Katy Nichole	"In Jesus Name (God of Possible)"†	
124	May 14	Katy Nichole	"In Jesus Name (God of Possible)"†		181	Katy Nichole	"In Jesus Name (God of Possible)"†	
124	May 21	Katy Nichole	"In Jesus Name (God of Possible)"†		181	Katy Nichole	"In Jesus Name (God of Possible)"†	
124	May 28	Katy Nichole	"In Jesus Name (God of Possible)"†		181	Katy Nichole	"In Jesus Name (God of Possible)"†	
124	June 4	Katy Nichole	"In Jesus Name (God of Possible)"†		181	Katy Nichole	"In Jesus Name (God of Possible)"†	
124	June 11	Katy Nichole	"In Jesus Name (God of Possible)"†		181	Katy Nichole	"In Jesus Name (God of Possible)"†	
124	June 18	Katy Nichole	"In Jesus Name (God of Possible)"†		181	Katy Nichole	"In Jesus Name (God of Possible)"†	
124	June 25	Katy Nichole	"In Jesus Name (God of Possible)"†		181	Katy Nichole	"In Jesus Name (God of Possible)"†	
124	July 2	Katy Nichole	"In Jesus Name (God of Possible)"†		182	For King & Country	"For God Is with Us"	
124	July 9	Katy Nichole	"In Jesus Name (God of Possible)"†		182	For King & Country	"For God Is with Us"	
124	July 16	Katy Nichole	"In Jesus Name (God of Possible)"†		182	For King & Country	"For God Is with Us"	
124	July 23	Katy Nichole	"In Jesus Name (God of Possible)"†		183	Brandon Heath	"See Me Through It"	
124	July 30	Katy Nichole	"In Jesus Name (God of Possible)"†		184	Matthew West	"Me On Your Mind"	
125	August 6	For King & Country	"For God Is with Us"		184	Matthew West	"Me On Your Mind"	
126	August 13	Matthew West	"Me On Your Mind"		185	Andrew Ripp	"Fill My Cup"	
re	August 20	Katy Nichole	"In Jesus Name (God of Possible)"†		re	Matthew West	"Me On Your Mind"	
re	August 27	Matthew West	"Me On Your Mind"		re	Matthew West	"Me On Your Mind"	
127	September 3	Toby Mac featuring Blessing Offor	"The Goodness"		re	Matthew West	"Me On Your Mind"	
128	September 10	DJ Khaled featuring Kanye West and Eminem	"Use This Gospel" remix		186	Jeremy Camp	"Getting Started"	
re	September 17	Toby Mac featuring Blessing Offor	"The Goodness"		186	Jeremy Camp	"Getting Started"	
re	September 24	Toby Mac featuring Blessing Offor	"The Goodness"		187	Toby Mac featuring Blessing Offor	"The Goodness"	
re	October 1	Toby Mac featuring Blessing Offor	"The Goodness"		187	Toby Mac featuring Blessing Offor	"The Goodness"	
re	October 8	Toby Mac featuring Blessing Offor	"The Goodness"		188	Tasha Layton	"How Far"	
129	October 15	Katy Nichole and Big Daddy Weave	"God Is in This Story"		re	Toby Mac featuring Blessing Offor	"The Goodness"	
129	October 22	Katy Nichole and Big Daddy Weave	"God Is in This Story"		re	Tasha Layton	"How Far"	
129	October 29	Katy Nichole and Big Daddy Weave	"God Is in This Story"		189	Katy Nichole and Big Daddy Weave	"God Is in This Story"	
130	November 5	Colton Dixon	"Build a Boat"		189	Katy Nichole and Big Daddy Weave	"God Is in This Story"	
130	November 12	Colton Dixon	"Build a Boat"		190	Ben Fuller	"Who I Am"	
130	November 19	Colton Dixon	"Build a Boat"		191	Colton Dixon	"Build a Boat"	
130	November 26	Colton Dixon	"Build a Boat"		191	Colton Dixon	"Build a Boat"	
130	December 3	Colton Dixon	"Build a Boat"		191	Colton Dixon	"Build a Boat"	
re	December 10	Katy Nichole	"In Jesus Name (God of Possible)"†		191	Colton Dixon	"Build a Boat"	
re	December 17	Katy Nichole	"In Jesus Name (God of Possible)"†		191	Colton Dixon	"Build a Boat"	
re	December 24	Katy Nichole	"In Jesus Name (God of Possible)"†		192	For King & Country	"Joy to the World"	
re	December 31	Katy Nichole	"In Jesus Name (God of Possible)"†		193	Francesca Battistelli	"Carolin'"	
2023
re	January 7	Colton Dixon	"Build a Boat"		re	Colton Dixon	"Build a Boat"	
re	January 14	Katy Nichole and Big Daddy Weave	"God Is in This Story"		re	Colton Dixon	"Build a Boat"	
131	January 21	Elevation Worship featuring Jonsal Barrientes	"Same God"		194	Elevation Worship featuring Jonsal Barrientes	"Same God"	
131	January 28	Elevation Worship featuring Jonsal Barrientes	"Same God"		194	Elevation Worship featuring Jonsal Barrientes	"Same God"	
132	February 4	Brandon Lake	"Gratitude"†		194	Elevation Worship featuring Jonsal Barrientes	"Same God"	
132	February 11	Brandon Lake	"Gratitude"†		195	MercyMe	"Then Christ Came"	
132	February 18	Brandon Lake	"Gratitude"†		195	MercyMe	"Then Christ Came"	
132	February 25	Brandon Lake	"Gratitude"†		196	For King & Country and Jordin Sparks	"Love Me Like I Am"	
132	March 4	Brandon Lake	"Gratitude"†		196	For King & Country and Jordin Sparks	"Love Me Like I Am"	
132	March 11	Brandon Lake	"Gratitude"†		197	Brandon Lake	"Gratitude"	
132	March 18	Brandon Lake	"Gratitude"†		198	Micah Tyler	"I See Grace"	
132	March 25	Brandon Lake	"Gratitude"†		198	Micah Tyler	"I See Grace"	
132	April 1	Brandon Lake	"Gratitude"†		198	Micah Tyler	"I See Grace"	
132	April 8	Brandon Lake	"Gratitude"†		198	Micah Tyler	"I See Grace"	
132	April 15	Brandon Lake	"Gratitude"†		198	Micah Tyler	"I See Grace"	
132	April 22	Brandon Lake	"Gratitude"†		199	Matt Maher	"The Lords Prayer (It's Yours)"	
132	April 29	Brandon Lake	"Gratitude"†		199	Matt Maher	"The Lords Prayer (It's Yours)"	
132	May 6	Brandon Lake	"Gratitude"†		199	Matt Maher	"The Lords Prayer (It's Yours)"	
132	May 13	Brandon Lake	"Gratitude"†		199	Matt Maher	"The Lords Prayer (It's Yours)"	
133	May 20	Lauren Daigle	"Thank God I Do"		199	Matt Maher	"The Lords Prayer (It's Yours)"	
133	May 27	Lauren Daigle	"Thank God I Do"		199	Matt Maher	"The Lords Prayer (It's Yours)"	
133	June 3	Lauren Daigle	"Thank God I Do"		200	Phil Wickham	"This Is Our God"†	
133	June 10	Lauren Daigle	"Thank God I Do"		201	Cochren & Co.	"Running Home"	
133	June 17	Lauren Daigle	"Thank God I Do"		201	Cochren & Co.	"Running Home"	
133	June 24	Lauren Daigle	"Thank God I Do"		201	Cochren & Co.	"Running Home"	
133	July 1	Lauren Daigle	"Thank God I Do"		201	Cochren & Co.	"Running Home"	
133	July 8	Lauren Daigle	"Thank God I Do"		re	Phil Wickham	"This Is Our God"†	
133	July 15	Lauren Daigle	"Thank God I Do"		202	Toby Mac featuring Zach Williams	"Cornerstone"	
133	July 22	Lauren Daigle	"Thank God I Do"		202	Toby Mac featuring Zach Williams	"Cornerstone"	
133	July 29	Lauren Daigle	"Thank God I Do"		203	Lauren Daigle	"Thank God I Do"	
133	August 5	Lauren Daigle	"Thank God I Do"		204	Chris Tomlin	"Holy Forever"	
133	August 12	Lauren Daigle	"Thank God I Do"		204	Chris Tomlin	"Holy Forever"	
133	August 19	Lauren Daigle	"Thank God I Do"		204	Chris Tomlin	"Holy Forever"	
133	August 26	Lauren Daigle	"Thank God I Do"		204	Chris Tomlin	"Holy Forever"	
133	September 2	Lauren Daigle	"Thank God I Do"		204	Chris Tomlin	"Holy Forever"	
133	September 9	Lauren Daigle	"Thank God I Do"		204	Chris Tomlin	"Holy Forever"	
133	September 16	Lauren Daigle	"Thank God I Do"		205	MercyMe	"To Not Worship You"	
133	September 23	Lauren Daigle	"Thank God I Do"		205	MercyMe	"To Not Worship You"	
133	September 30	Lauren Daigle	"Thank God I Do"		205	MercyMe	"To Not Worship You"	
134	October 7	Chris Tomlin	"Holy Forever"		205	MercyMe	"To Not Worship You"	
134	October 14	Chris Tomlin	"Holy Forever"		205	MercyMe	"To Not Worship You"	
134	October 21	Chris Tomlin	"Holy Forever"		205	MercyMe	"To Not Worship You"	
134	October 28	Chris Tomlin	"Holy Forever"		206	Micah Tyler	"Praise the Lord"	
135	November 4	Brandon Lake	"Praise You Anywhere"		206	Micah Tyler	"Praise the Lord"	
135	November 11	Brandon Lake	"Praise You Anywhere"		206	Micah Tyler	"Praise the Lord"	
135	November 18	Brandon Lake	"Praise You Anywhere"		207	For King & Country	"What Are We Waiting For?"	
135	November 25	Brandon Lake	"Praise You Anywhere"		207	For King & Country	"What Are We Waiting For?"	
135	December 2	Brandon Lake	"Praise You Anywhere"		208	Housefires & JWLKRS Worship featuring Blake Wiggins & Ryan Ellis	"I Thank God"	
re	December 9	Brandon Lake	"Gratitude"†		208	Housefires & JWLKRS Worship featuring Blake Wiggins & Ryan Ellis	"I Thank God"	
re	December 16	Brandon Lake	"Gratitude"†		208	Housefires & JWLKRS Worship featuring Blake Wiggins & Ryan Ellis	"I Thank God"	
re	December 23	Brandon Lake	"Gratitude"†		208	Housefires & JWLKRS Worship featuring Blake Wiggins & Ryan Ellis	"I Thank God"	
re	December 30	Brandon Lake	"Gratitude"†		209	Blessing Offor	"Wonderful Christmastime"	
2024
re	January 6	Brandon Lake	"Gratitude"		re	Housefires & JWLKRS Worship featuring Blake Wiggins & Ryan Ellis	"I Thank God"	
re	January 13	Brandon Lake	"Praise You Anywhere"		re	Housefires & JWLKRS Worship featuring Blake Wiggins & Ryan Ellis	"I Thank God"	
re	January 20	Brandon Lake	"Gratitude"		re	Housefires & JWLKRS Worship featuring Blake Wiggins & Ryan Ellis	"I Thank God"	
re	January 27	Brandon Lake	"Gratitude"		re	Housefires & JWLKRS Worship featuring Blake Wiggins & Ryan Ellis	"I Thank God"	
re	February 3	Brandon Lake	"Gratitude"		re	Housefires & JWLKRS Worship featuring Blake Wiggins & Ryan Ellis	"I Thank God"	
re	February 10	Brandon Lake	"Gratitude"		re	Housefires & JWLKRS Worship featuring Blake Wiggins & Ryan Ellis	"I Thank God"	
re	February 17	Brandon Lake	"Gratitude"		210	TobyMac	"Faithfully"	
re	February 24	Brandon Lake	"Gratitude"		210	TobyMac	"Faithfully"	
re	March 2	Brandon Lake	"Gratitude"		210	TobyMac	"Faithfully"	
re	March 9	Brandon Lake	"Gratitude"		210	TobyMac	"Faithfully"	
136	March 16	Elevation Worship featuring Brandon Lake, Chris Brown and Chandler Moore	"Praise"		210	TobyMac	"Faithfully"	
136	March 23	Elevation Worship featuring Brandon Lake, Chris Brown and Chandler Moore	"Praise"		210	TobyMac	"Faithfully"	
136	March 30	Elevation Worship featuring Brandon Lake, Chris Brown and Chandler Moore	"Praise"		210	TobyMac	"Faithfully"	
136	April 6	Elevation Worship featuring Brandon Lake, Chris Brown and Chandler Moore	"Praise"		211	Patrick Mayberry	"Lead on Good Shephard"	
136	April 13	Elevation Worship featuring Brandon Lake, Chris Brown and Chandler Moore	"Praise"		212	Seph Schlueter	"Counting My Blessings"	
136	April 20	Elevation Worship featuring Brandon Lake, Chris Brown and Chandler Moore	"Praise"		212	Seph Schlueter	"Counting My Blessings"	
136	April 27	Elevation Worship featuring Brandon Lake, Chris Brown and Chandler Moore	"Praise"		212	Seph Schlueter	"Counting My Blessings"	
136	May 4	Elevation Worship featuring Brandon Lake, Chris Brown and Chandler Moore	"Praise"		213	Crowder	"Grave Robber"	
136	May 11	Elevation Worship featuring Brandon Lake, Chris Brown and Chandler Moore	"Praise"		213	Crowder	"Grave Robber"	
136	May 18	Elevation Worship featuring Brandon Lake, Chris Brown and Chandler Moore	"Praise"		re	Seph Schlueter	"Counting My Blessings"	
136	May 25	Elevation Worship featuring Brandon Lake, Chris Brown and Chandler Moore	"Praise"		214	Elevation Worship featuring Brandon Lake, Chris Brown and Chandler Moore	"Praise"	
136	June 1	Elevation Worship featuring Brandon Lake, Chris Brown and Chandler Moore	"Praise"		214	Elevation Worship featuring Brandon Lake, Chris Brown and Chandler Moore	"Praise"	
136	June 8	Elevation Worship featuring Brandon Lake, Chris Brown and Chandler Moore	"Praise"		214	Elevation Worship featuring Brandon Lake, Chris Brown and Chandler Moore	"Praise"	
136	June 15	Elevation Worship featuring Brandon Lake, Chris Brown and Chandler Moore	"Praise"		214	Elevation Worship featuring Brandon Lake, Chris Brown and Chandler Moore	"Praise"	
136	June 22	Elevation Worship featuring Brandon Lake, Chris Brown and Chandler Moore	"Praise"		214	Elevation Worship featuring Brandon Lake, Chris Brown and Chandler Moore	"Praise"	
136	June 29	Elevation Worship featuring Brandon Lake, Chris Brown and Chandler Moore	"Praise"		214	Elevation Worship featuring Brandon Lake, Chris Brown and Chandler Moore	"Praise"	
136	July 6	Elevation Worship featuring Brandon Lake, Chris Brown and Chandler Moore	"Praise"		214	Elevation Worship featuring Brandon Lake, Chris Brown and Chandler Moore	"Praise"	
136	July 13	Elevation Worship featuring Brandon Lake, Chris Brown and Chandler Moore	"Praise"		214	Elevation Worship featuring Brandon Lake, Chris Brown and Chandler Moore	"Praise"	
136	July 20	Elevation Worship featuring Brandon Lake, Chris Brown and Chandler Moore	"Praise"		215	Matthew West	"Don't Stop Praying"	
136	July 27	Elevation Worship featuring Brandon Lake, Chris Brown and Chandler Moore	"Praise"		215	Matthew West	"Don't Stop Praying"	
136	August 3	Elevation Worship featuring Brandon Lake, Chris Brown and Chandler Moore	"Praise"		re	Elevation Worship featuring Brandon Lake, Chris Brown and Chandler Moore	"Praise"	
136	August 10	Elevation Worship featuring Brandon Lake, Chris Brown and Chandler Moore	"Praise"		216	Tauren Wells With Davies	"Take It All Back"	
136	August 17	Elevation Worship featuring Brandon Lake, Chris Brown and Chandler Moore	"Praise"		216	Tauren Wells With Davies	"Take It All Back"	
136	August 24	Elevation Worship featuring Brandon Lake, Chris Brown and Chandler Moore	"Praise"		216	Tauren Wells With Davies	"Take It All Back"	
136	August 31	Elevation Worship featuring Brandon Lake, Chris Brown and Chandler Moore	"Praise"		216	Tauren Wells With Davies	"Take It All Back"	
136	September 7	Elevation Worship featuring Brandon Lake, Chris Brown and Chandler Moore	"Praise"		216	Tauren Wells With Davies	"Take It All Back"	
136	September 14	Elevation Worship featuring Brandon Lake, Chris Brown and Chandler Moore	"Praise"		217	Josh Baldwin featuring Jenn Johnson	"Made for More"	
136	September 21	Elevation Worship featuring Brandon Lake, Chris Brown and Chandler Moore	"Praise"		217	Josh Baldwin featuring Jenn Johnson	"Made for More"	
136	September 28	Elevation Worship featuring Brandon Lake, Chris Brown and Chandler Moore	"Praise"		217	Josh Baldwin featuring Jenn Johnson	"Made for More"	
136	October 5	Elevation Worship featuring Brandon Lake, Chris Brown and Chandler Moore	"Praise"		217	Caleb & John featuring CAIN	"Somebody Like Me"	
136	October 12	Elevation Worship featuring Brandon Lake, Chris Brown and Chandler Moore	"Praise"		217	Caleb & John featuring CAIN	"Somebody Like Me"	
137	October 19	Brandon Lake	"That's Who I Praise"		218	Tasha Layton featuring Chris Brown	"Worship Through It"	
137	October 26	Brandon Lake	"That's Who I Praise"		218	Tasha Layton featuring Chris Brown	"Worship Through It"	
137	November 2	Brandon Lake	"That's Who I Praise"		218	Tasha Layton featuring Chris Brown	"Worship Through It"	
137	November 9	Brandon Lake	"That's Who I Praise"		219	Cody Carnes and Benjamin William Hastings	"Take You At Your Word"	
137	November 16	Brandon Lake	"That's Who I Praise"		220	TobyMac	"Nothin' Sweeter"	
138	November 23	Brandon Lake	"Hard Fought Hallelujah"		re	Cody Carnes and Benjamin William Hastings	"Take You At Your Word"	
138	November 30	Brandon Lake	"Hard Fought Hallelujah"		221	Brandon Lake	"That's Who I Praise"	
138	December 7	Brandon Lake	"Hard Fought Hallelujah"		221	Brandon Lake	"That's Who I Praise"	
138	December 14	Brandon Lake	"Hard Fought Hallelujah"		221	Brandon Lake	"That's Who I Praise"	
138	December 21	Brandon Lake	"Hard Fought Hallelujah"		221	Brandon Lake	"That's Who I Praise"	
138	December 28	Brandon Lake	"Hard Fought Hallelujah"		222	Phil Wickham	"Angels (Glory to God)"	
2025
138	January 4	Brandon Lake	"Hard Fought Hallelujah"		222	Phil Wickham	"Angels (Glory to God)"	
re	January 11	Brandon Lake	"That's Who I Praise"		re	Brandon Lake	"That's Who I Praise"	
re	January 18	Brandon Lake	"That's Who I Praise"		re	Brandon Lake	"That's Who I Praise"	
re	January 25	Brandon Lake	"That's Who I Praise"		re	Brandon Lake	"That's Who I Praise"	
re	February 1	Brandon Lake	"That's Who I Praise"		re	Brandon Lake	"That's Who I Praise"	
re	February 8	Brandon Lake	"Hard Fought Hallelujah"		re	Brandon Lake	"That's Who I Praise"	
re	February 16	Brandon Lake	"Hard Fought Hallelujah"		re	Brandon Lake	"That's Who I Praise"	
re	February 23	Brandon Lake	"Hard Fought Hallelujah"		223	Crowder	"Somebody Prayed"	
re	March 1	Brandon Lake	"Hard Fought Hallelujah"		223	Crowder	"Somebody Prayed"	
re	March 8	Brandon Lake	"Hard Fought Hallelujah"		223	Crowder	"Somebody Prayed"	
re	March 16	Brandon Lake	"Hard Fought Hallelujah"		223	Crowder	"Somebody Prayed"	
re	March 23	Brandon Lake	"Hard Fought Hallelujah"		224	Seph Schlueter	"Running Back to You"	
re	March 30	Brandon Lake	"Hard Fought Hallelujah"		re	Crowder	"Somebody Prayed"	
re	April 5	Brandon Lake	"Hard Fought Hallelujah"		re	Seph Schlueter	"Running Back to You"	
re	April 12	Brandon Lake	"Hard Fought Hallelujah"		re	Seph Schlueter	"Running Back to You"	
re	April 19	Brandon Lake	"Hard Fought Hallelujah"		re	Seph Schlueter	"Running Back to You"	
re	April 26	Brandon Lake	"Hard Fought Hallelujah"		re	Seph Schlueter	"Running Back to You"	
re	May 3	Brandon Lake	"Hard Fought Hallelujah"		225	Leanna Crawford	"Still Waters (Psalm 23)"	
re	May 10	Brandon Lake	"Hard Fought Hallelujah"		226	Brandon Lake	"Hard Fought Hallelujah"	
re	May 17	Brandon Lake	"Hard Fought Hallelujah"		226	Brandon Lake	"Hard Fought Hallelujah"	
139	May 24	Forrest Frank	"Your Way's Better"		226	Brandon Lake	"Hard Fought Hallelujah"	
139	May 31	Forrest Frank	"Your Way's Better"		226	Brandon Lake	"Hard Fought Hallelujah"	
139	June 7	Forrest Frank	"Your Way's Better"		227	Jon Reddick	"No Fear"	
139	June 14	Forrest Frank	"Your Way's Better"		227	Jon Reddick	"No Fear"	
139	June 21	Forrest Frank	"Your Way's Better"		227	Jon Reddick	"No Fear"	
re	June 28	Brandon Lake	"Hard Fought Hallelujah"		227	Jon Reddick	"No Fear"	
re	July 5	Forrest Frank	"Your Way's Better"		227	Jon Reddick	"No Fear"	
re	July 12	Brandon Lake	"Hard Fought Hallelujah"		227	Jon Reddick	"No Fear"	
re	July 19	Brandon Lake	"Hard Fought Hallelujah"		227	Jon Reddick	"No Fear"	
re	July 26	Forrest Frank	"Your Way's Better"		227	Jon Reddick	"No Fear"	
re	August 2	Brandon Lake	"Hard Fought Hallelujah"		227	Jon Reddick	"No Fear"	
re	August 9	Forrest Frank	"Your Way's Better"		227	Jon Reddick	"No Fear"	
re	August 16	Forrest Frank	"Your Way's Better"		228	Phil Wickham	"What an Awesome God"	
re	August 23	Forrest Frank	"Your Way's Better"		228	Phil Wickham	"What an Awesome God"	
re	August 30	Forrest Frank	"Your Way's Better"		228	Phil Wickham	"What an Awesome God"	
re	September 6	Forrest Frank	"Your Way's Better"		228	Phil Wickham	"What an Awesome God"	
re	September 13	Forrest Frank	"Your Way's Better"		228	Phil Wickham	"What an Awesome God"	
re	September 20	Forrest Frank	"Your Way's Better"		228	Phil Wickham	"What an Awesome God"	
re	September 27	Forrest Frank	"Your Way's Better"		228	Phil Wickham	"What an Awesome God"	
re	October 4	Forrest Frank	"Your Way's Better"		228	Phil Wickham	"What an Awesome God"	
re	October 11	Forrest Frank	"Your Way's Better"		228	Phil Wickham	"What an Awesome God"	
re	October 18	Forrest Frank	"Your Way's Better"		228	Phil Wickham	"What an Awesome God"	
re	October 25	Brandon Lake	"Hard Fought Hallelujah"		228	Phil Wickham	"What an Awesome God"	
re	November 1	Brandon Lake	"Hard Fought Hallelujah"		228	Phil Wickham	"What an Awesome God"	
re	November 8	Brandon Lake	"Hard Fought Hallelujah"		228	Phil Wickham	"What an Awesome God"	
re	November 15	Brandon Lake	"Hard Fought Hallelujah"		228	Phil Wickham	"What an Awesome God"	
re	November 22	Brandon Lake	"Hard Fought Hallelujah"		229	Josiah Queen and Brandon Lake	"Can't Steal My Joy"	
re	November 29	Brandon Lake	"Hard Fought Hallelujah"		re	Phil Wickham	"What an Awesome God"	
re	December 6	Brandon Lake	"Hard Fought Hallelujah"		re	Phil Wickham	"What an Awesome God"	
re	December 13	Brandon Lake	"Hard Fought Hallelujah"		230	We Are Messengers	"We Three Kings"	
re	December 20	Brandon Lake	"Hard Fought Hallelujah"		230	We Are Messengers	"We Three Kings"	
re	December 27	Brandon Lake	"Hard Fought Hallelujah"		230	We Are Messengers	"We Three Kings"	
2026
re	January 3	Brandon Lake	"Hard Fought Hallelujah"		230	We Are Messengers	"We Three Kings"	
re	January 10	Brandon Lake	"Hard Fought Hallelujah"		re	Josiah Queen and Brandon Lake	"Can't Steal My Joy"	
re	January 17	Brandon Lake	"Hard Fought Hallelujah"		re	Josiah Queen and Brandon Lake	"Can't Steal My Joy"	
re	January 24	Brandon Lake	"Hard Fought Hallelujah"		231	Jamie MacDonald	"Left It in the River"	
re	January 31	Brandon Lake	"Hard Fought Hallelujah"		231	Jamie MacDonald	"Left It in the River"	
re	February 7	Brandon Lake	"Hard Fought Hallelujah"		232	Seph Schlueter	"Won't Start Now"	
re	February 14	Brandon Lake	"Hard Fought Hallelujah"		232	Seph Schlueter	"Won't Start Now"	
140	February 21	Kid Rock	"'Til You Can't"		232	Seph Schlueter	"Won't Start Now"	
re	February 28	Brandon Lake	"Hard Fought Hallelujah"		232	Seph Schlueter	"Won't Start Now"	
re	March 7	Brandon Lake	"Hard Fought Hallelujah"		233	Lauren Daigle	"Let It Be a Hallelujah"	
re	March 14	Brandon Lake	"Hard Fought Hallelujah"		234	Tobymac and Forrest Frank	"Heaven on My Mind"	
re	March 21	Brandon Lake	"Hard Fought Hallelujah"		235	Phil Wickham	"Homesick for Heaven"	
re	March 28	Brandon Lake	"Hard Fought Hallelujah"		235	Phil Wickham	"Homesick for Heaven"	
re	April 4	Brandon Lake	"Hard Fought Hallelujah"		235	Phil Wickham	"Homesick for Heaven"	
re	April 11	Brandon Lake	"Hard Fought Hallelujah"		235	Phil Wickham	"Homesick for Heaven"	
re	April 18	Brandon Lake	"Hard Fought Hallelujah"		235	Phil Wickham	"Homesick for Heaven"	
re	April 25	Brandon Lake	"Hard Fought Hallelujah"		235	Phil Wickham	"Homesick for Heaven"	
re	May 2	Brandon Lake	"Hard Fought Hallelujah"		235	Phil Wickham	"Homesick for Heaven"	
re	May 9	Brandon Lake	"Hard Fought Hallelujah"		235	Phil Wickham	"Homesick for Heaven"	
re	May 16	Brandon Lake	"Hard Fought Hallelujah"		236	Peter Burton	"Where Would I Be"	
141	May 23	Josiah Queen	"Demons"		236	Peter Burton	"Where Would I Be"	
142	May 30	Forrest Frank	"Jesus Is Alive!"		236	Peter Burton	"Where Would I Be"	
re	June 6	Josiah Queen	"Demons"		236	Peter Burton	"Where Would I Be"	
143	June 13	Elevation Worship featuring Chandler Moore	"God I'm Just Grateful"		236	Peter Burton	"Where Would I Be"	
re	June 20	Forrest Frank	"Your Way's Better"		236	Peter Burton	"Where Would I Be"	
re	June 27	Forrest Frank	"Your Way's Better"		236	Matthew West	"Gold"	
144	July 4	Elevation Rhythm	"Washed"		236	Matthew West	"Gold"	
144	July 11	Elevation Rhythm	"Washed"		237	Elevation Rhythm	"Washed"	
144	July 18	Elevation Rhythm	"Washed"		237	Elevation Rhythm	"Washed"	
144	July 25	Elevation Rhythm	"Washed"		237	Elevation Rhythm	"Washed"	
144	August 1	Elevation Rhythm	"Washed"		238	Zach Williams	"Wait for Me"	
144	August 8	Elevation Rhythm	"Washed"		239	Jamie MacDonald	"Ain't No Way"	
144	August 15	Elevation Rhythm	"Washed"		240	Phil Wickham and Crowder	"It Really Is Amazing Grace"	
144	August 22	Elevation Rhythm	"Washed"		240	Phil Wickham and Crowder	"It Really Is Amazing Grace"	
144	August 29	Elevation Rhythm	"Washed"		240	Phil Wickham and Crowder	"It Really Is Amazing Grace"	
re	September 5	Elevation Worship featuring Chandler Moore	"God I'm Just Grateful"			Phil Wickham and Crowder	"It Really Is Amazing Grace"	
re	September 12	Elevation Worship featuring Chandler Moore	"God I'm Just Grateful"			Phil Wickham and Crowder	"It Really Is Amazing Grace"	
re	September 19	Elevation Worship featuring Chandler Moore	"God I'm Just Grateful"			Phil Wickham and Crowder	"It Really Is Amazing Grace"	
re	September 26	Elevation Worship featuring Chandler Moore	"God I'm Just Grateful"			Phil Wickham and Crowder	"It Really Is Amazing Grace"	
