= Let It Begin =

Studio album by Big Daddy Weave
- Released: May 23, 2025
- Genre: Pop/rock; alternative pop; Christian/gospel; Christian rock; Christian pop
- Length: 57:15
- Label: Curb Records
- Producer: Jeremy Redmon; Matt Maher; Jeff Pardo

Big Daddy Weave chronology
When the Light Comes In (2019)	Let It Begin (2025)

Singles from Let It Begin
- 1. "God Is in This Story" Released: June 12, 2022; 2. "Heaven Changes Everything" Released: March 10, 2023; 3. "Let It Begin" Released: March 15, 2024; 4. "My Hope is Jesus" Released: September 27, 2024; 5. "I've Just Seen Too Much" Released: March 28, 2025; 6. "Stranger No More" Released: April 25, 2025

Let It Begin is the ninth studio album by American Christian rock band Big Daddy Weave. The album was released on May 23, 2025, through Curb Records. It is the band's first album to be released following bassist Jay Weaver's death in 2022.

== Background ==
Predating the album, five singles were released. The first single released off the album was "God Is in This Story", with Katy Nichole, released on June 12, 2022. As well as being included on Let It Begin, the song was also featured on Nichole's self-titled extended play, Katy Nichole, and her debut studio album, Jesus Changed My Life. The song reached significant chart positioning, including No. 1 on the Billboard Hot Christian Songs and Christian Airplay, as well as reaching No. 2 on the Christian Adult Contemporary Airplay and No. 4 on the Christian Digital Song Sales.

The second single released off of Let It Begin was "Heaven Changes Everything", released on March 10, 2023. "Heaven Changes Everything" achieved notable success as well. The song reached No. 2 on the Billboard Hot Christian Songs and Christian Airplay, and topped the Christian Adult Contemporary Airplay Chart.

Following "Heaven Changes Everything", "Let It Begin", the album's title track, was released as a single. The song was released on March 15, 2024. "Let It Begin" reached No. 15 on the Billboard Hot Christian Songs chart, No. 5 on the Christian Airplay, and No. 7 on the Christian Adult Contemporary Airplay. On January 10, 2025, a version of "Let It Begin" was released, featuring musicians Megan Woods and Ben Fuller.

On September 27, 2024, the fourth single off the album was released, "My Hope is Jesus", which did not enter the Billboard charts. The fifth and final single released from Let It Begin was "I've Just Seen Too Much", released on March 28, 2025.

Let It Begin was revealed in an interview on September 13, 2023. The track listing and release date was revealed on March 28, 2025.

To give fans a more in-depth description to the stories of the album, Big Daddy Weave has begun releasing a video-podcast series, titled "Cabin Conversations", in which lead-vocalist Mike Weaver discusses the meaning behind each of the songs on Let It Begin. The song "Jaybird" is a tribute to former bassist Jay Weaver, who died to COVID-19 in 2022 at age 42.

Let It Begin was supported by two tours, including the Heaven Changes Everything tour of 2023–24, featuring Tasha Layton, Austin French and Hannah Kerr, and the Let It Begin tour of 2024–25, featuring Hannah Kerr, The Young Escape, Megan Woods and Ben Fuller.

== Accolades ==
Year-end lists
Publication	Accolade	Rank	Ref.
New Release Today	Top 10 Albums of 2025	Unordered	

== Track listing ==
All tracks produced by Jeremy Redmon, except where noted.

No.	Title	Writer(s)	Producer(s)	Length
1.	"Let It Begin"	Matt Maher; Emily Weisband	Jeremy Redmon; Matt Maher	4:12
2.	"My Hope Is Jesus"	Mitch Wong; Mike Weaver; Taylor Agan		4:02
3.	"I've Just Seen Too Much"	Hank Bentley; Michael Farren; Mike Weaver		4:17
4.	"Stranger No More" (with Zach Williams)	Colby Wedgeworth; Ethan Hulse; Zach Williams		3:43
5.	"Heaven Changes Everything"	Jeff Pardo; Matthew West; Mike Weaver	Jeff Pardo; Jeremy Redmon	3:31
6.	"Louder Than the Lies"	Dalton Lee Smith; Mike Weaver; Sam Hart		3:51
7.	"Constantly"	Bernie Herms; Mike Weaver		4:04
8.	"Lions and Eagles"	Micah Kuiper; Mike Donehey; Mike Weaver		3:00
9.	"Have Your Way"	Bernie Hermes; Mike Weaver		4:47
10.	"Free"	Mike Weaver		4:15
11.	"God Is in This Story" (with Katy Nichole)	Ethan Hulse; Jeff Pardo; Katy Nichole		3:27
12.	"Good Grief" (with Jason Gray)	Hank Bentley; Jason Gray; Mike Weaver		3:01
13.	"Jaybird"	Hank Bentley; Mike Weaver		4:38
14.	"This Is Not the End"	Mike Weaver		3:12
15.	"Let It Begin" (with Megan Woods and Ben Fuller)	Emily Weisband; Matt Maher	Jeremy Redmon; Matt Maher	4:12
Total length:				57:15

== Charts ==
Chart performance for Let It Begin
Chart (2025)	Peak position
US Top Christian Albums (Billboard)	20
