= Caleb & John =

Christian pop music duo

- Genres: pop; rock; pop rock; Christian contemporary
- Years active: 2022–present
- Label: Fair Trade Services
- Members: Caleb Crino; John Secker
- Website: www.calebandjohn.com

Caleb & John is a contemporary Christian pop music duo, composed of Caleb Crino and John Secker.

== History ==
Crino and Secker met in late 2022, after being introduced through a mutual friend.

On March 17, 2023, it had been announced that the duo had signed with Fair Trade Services. They released their debut single, "Hallelujah Feeling", on July 28, 2023, which became the highest charting debut single to be released to Christian radio in 2023. The song is based on Romans 15:13. On August 25, 2023, they released "Somebody Like Me". On September 15, 2023, they released "Nothing But the Goodness". Their third single, "Missing Jesus", was released on October 13, 2023.

On March 1, 2024, the duo released a version of "Somebody Like Me", which featured the band CAIN. The song reached No. 1 on the Billboard Christian Airplay and Adult Contemporary.

== Personal life ==
Crino is the son of a pastor, and grew up in the northeast. He has made music as a solo artist since 2019. He learned to play piano at 13 years old. In 2014, he moved to Nashville.

Secker has five sisters.

They have both worked with artists Sam Hunt, Katy Nichole, CAIN, and Anne Wilson.

== Members ==
- Caleb Crino – vocals, guitars, keyboards (2022–present)
- John Secker – vocals, guitars (2022–present)

== Discography ==
=== Singles ===
Title	Year	Peak chart positions			Album
Title	Year	US Christ	US Christ Air	US Christ AC	Album
"Hallelujah Feeling"	2023	16	8	5	Non-album singles
"Somebody Like Me" (original or with CAIN)	2023	11	1	1	Non-album singles
"Nothing But the Goodness"	2023	—	—	—	Non-album singles
"Missing Jesus"	2023	—	—	—	Non-album singles
"Finished"	2025	19	9	6	Non-album singles
"Call It Saved"	2025	—	—	—	Non-album singles
"Ghost in the Graveyard"	2025	—	—	—	Non-album singles
"—" denotes a recording that did not chart or was not released in that territory.

== Tours ==
=== As featured act ===
- The Truth Tour (with Megan Woods and Jeremy Rosado)
