= Katy Nichole (EP) =

2022 EP by Katy Nichole

EP by Katy Nichole
- Released: June 24, 2022
- Recorded: 2021
- Genre: CCM; contemporary worship
- Length: 21:26
- Label: Centricity Music
- Producer: Jeff Pardo; Jonathan Smith; Brad King; David Leonard

Singles from Katy Nichole
- 1. "In Jesus Name (God of Possible)" Released: January 26, 2022; 2. "God Is in This Story" Released: June 10, 2022

Katy Nichole is the debut extended play (EP) by American contemporary Christian music singer Katy Nichole, which was released via Centricity Music on June 24, 2022. The EP contains a guest appearance by Big Daddy Weave. The production of the EP was handled by Jeff Pardo, Jonathan Smith, Brad King, and David Leonard.

The EP was supported by the release of "In Jesus Name (God of Possible)" and "God Is in This Story" as singles. "In Jesus Name (God of Possible)" was Nichole's breakthrough hit single, reaching number one the Bubbling Under Hot 100 chart and the Hot Christian Songs chart. "God Is in This Story" also reached number one on the Hot Christian Songs chart.

The EP debuted at number seven on the Top Christian Albums chart in the United States.

== Release and promotion ==
"In Jesus Name (God of Possible)" was released on January 26, 2022, as the first single from the EP. "In Jesus Name (God of Possible)" reached number one on the Hot Christian Songs chart dated March 26, 2022, on the back of significant gains in radio airplay and downloads. It went on to reach number one on the Bubbling Under Hot 100 chart, as well as the Christian Airplay chart dated April 30, 2022. "In Jesus Name (God of Possible)" received a GMA Dove Award nomination for Pop/Contemporary Recorded Song of the Year at the 2022 GMA Dove Awards.

"God Is in This Story" was released as the second single from the EP on June 10, 2022. The song peaked at number one on the Hot Christian Songs chart.

== Critical reception ==
Professional ratings
Review scores
Source	Rating
365 Days of Inspiring Media	5/5
Today's Christian Entertainment	4.8/5 stars

Jonathan Andre in his 365 Days of Inspiring Media review, applauded Nichole for the EP, saying: "Well done Katy for this stunning, prolific, and compelling 6 song EP. Looking forward to seeing whatever the Lord has in store for these songs in the upcoming weeks and months ahead." Kelly Meade, indicating in a favorable review at Today's Christian Entertainment, concluded: "Without a doubt, Katy Nichole's EP proves that this talented artist will continue using the gifts God has given her to speak hope into the lives of listeners through songs that remind us of our Heavenly Father’s abundant power, grace and love. From the lyrics to the music to the vocal performances and the production, this EP is a very solid and exciting debut!" Gerod Bass of Worship Musician magazine wrote a positive review of the EP, saying: "I really enjoyed this little EP from Katy Nichole and I especially how she wrote these songs from a place of dependence and faith in Jesus a she endured a tough season in her life. The songs are well written, scripturally based for the most part and could be emulated by most worship teams." Reviewing for The Banner, Paul Delger said, "Listening to this EP reinforces the reasoning behind Nichole's huge rise in the music business. She's just plain good."

== Commercial performance ==
In the United States, Katy Nichole debuted at number seven on the Billboard's Top Christian Albums chart dated July 9, 2022.

== Track listing ==
All tracks were produced by Jeff Pardo where stated.

Katy Nichole
No.	Title	Writer(s)	Producer(s)	Length
1.	"In Jesus Name (God of Possible)"	David Spencer; Ethan Hulse; Jeff Pardo; Katy Nichole		3:42
2.	"Jesus Changed My Life"	Benji Cowart; Jonathan Smith; Katy Nichole	Jonathan Smith	3:42
3.	"God Is in This Story" (with Big Daddy Weave)	Hulse; Pardo; Nichole		3:27
4.	"Things I Wish I Would've Said"	Hulse; Pardo; Nichole		3:26
5.	"Jesus, Thank You"	David Leonard; Nichole; Mia Fieldes	Brad King; David Leonard	3:27
6.	"In Jesus Name (God of Possible)" (Piano Version)	Spencer; Hulse; Pardo; Nichole		3:40
Total length:				21:26

== Charts ==
=== Weekly charts ===
Weekly chart performance for Katy Nichole
Chart (2022)	Peak position
US Christian Albums (Billboard)	7

=== Year-end charts ===
Year-end chart performance for Katy Nichole
Chart (2022)	Position
US Christian Albums (Billboard)	48
Chart (2023)	Position
US Christian Albums (Billboard)	52

== Release history ==
Release dates and formats for Katy Nichole
Region	Date	Format	Label	Ref.
Various	June 24, 2022	Digital download; streaming	Centricity Music	
Various	July 22, 2022	CD	Centricity Music	
