= God Is in This Story =

2022 single by Katy Nichole and Big Daddy Weave

Single by Katy Nichole and Big Daddy Weave

from the album Jesus Changed My Life and Let It Begin
- Released: June 10, 2022
- Genre: CCM; contemporary worship
- Length: 3:28
- Label: Centricity Music; Word Entertainment
- Songwriters: Ethan Hulse; Katy Nichole; Jeff Pardo
- Producer: Jeff Pardo

Katy Nichole singles chronology
| "In Jesus Name (God of Possible)" (2022) | "God Is in This Story" (2022) | "Good Lord" (2022) |

Big Daddy Weave singles chronology
| "All Things New" (2021) | "God Is in This Story" (2022) |

Music videos
- "God Is in This Story" on YouTube
- "God Is in This Story" (Lyrics) on YouTube

"God Is in This Story" is a song by American contemporary Christian music musicians Katy Nichole and Big Daddy Weave, released on June 10, 2022, as the second single from her debut extended play, Katy Nichole (2022). Nichole co-wrote the song with Ethan Hulse and Jeff Pardo.

"God Is in This Story" peaked at number one on the US Hot Christian Songs chart, becoming Nichole's second and Big Daddy Weave's third chart-topping single.

== Background ==
On June 10, 2022, Nichole and Big Daddy Weave released the single "God Is In This Story". The song follows the release of Nichole's breakthrough number one hit single, "In Jesus Name (God of Possible)". "God Is In This Story" was jointly promoted to Christian radio in the United States by Centricity Music and Word Entertainment, impacting radio stations on July 15, 2022.

== Writing and development ==
Nichole shared the story behind the song, saying it was based on an interaction with someone who suggested she write about how "God was in the details".

Nichole co-wrote the song with Ethan Hulse and Jeff Pardo, then went on to share the song with Big Daddy Weave having formed a relationship as she joining them on select dates during their spring 2022 tour.

== Composition ==
"God Is in This Story" is composed in the key of B with a tempo of 73 beats per minute and a musical time signature of 4/4.

== Critical reception ==
Reviewing for 365 Days Of Inspiring Media, Jonathan Andre gave a positive opinion of the song. Kelly Meade of Today Christian Entertainment wrote a favourable review of the song.

== Commercial performance ==
"God Is in This Story" debuted at number 31 on the Christian Airplay chart dated July 2, 2022. The following week, the song debuted at number 31 on the US Hot Christian Songs chart dated February 12, 2022, concurrently maintaining its position at number 26 on the Christian Airplay chart, and debuting at number four on the Christian Digital Song Sales chart. The song peaked at number one on the Hot Christian Songs chart dated October 15, 2022. "God Is in This Story" become Nichole's second Hot Christian Songs chart-topping single after "In Jesus Name (God of Possible)", while being Big Daddy Weave's third number one after the 2012 single "Redeemed" and the 2007 single "Every Time I Breathe". "God Is in This Story" reached number one on the Christian Airplay chart dated October 29, 2022, becoming Nichole's second Christian Airplay chart-topping single, and the seventh Christian Airplay number one single for Big Daddy Weave.

== Music videos ==
On June 10, 2022, Katy Nichole released the official lyric video for the piano version of the song through YouTube.

On July 6, 2022, Katy Nichole released the official music video for "In Jesus Name (God of Possible)" on YouTube. The music video was directed by Diego Brawn and produced by Velasco Visuals.

== Track listing ==
All tracks are produced by Jeff Pardo.

"God Is in This Story"
| No. | Title | Writer(s) | Length |
|---|---|---|---|
| 1. | "God Is In This Story" | Ethan Hulse; Katy Nichole; Jeff Pardo | 3:28 |
| 2. | "In Jesus Name (God of Possible)" | Hulse; Nichole; Pardo; David Spencer | 3:42 |
| 3. | "In Jesus Name (God of Possible)" (Piano Version) | Hulse; Nichole; Pardo; Spencer | 3:40 |
| Total length: | | | 10:50 |

== Personnel ==
Adapted from AllMusic.

- Katy Nichole - Vocals
- Jacob Arnold — drums, percussion
- Chris Bevins — editing
- Big Daddy Weave — primary artist, vocals
- Mike Cervantes — mastering
- Court Clement — acoustic guitar, Bouzouki, electric guitar, guitar, mandolin, Pedal Steel guitar
- Nickie Conley — background vocals
- Jason Eskridge — background vocals
- Tony Lucido — bass
- John Mays — A&R
- Wil Merrell — background vocals
- Sean Moffitt — Mixing
- Katy Nichole — background vocals, primary artist, vocals
- Jeff Pardo — background vocals, keyboards, piano, producer, programming, synthesizer bass
- Kiley Phillips — background vocals
- Big Daddy Weave:
- Mike Weaver - Lead Vocals, Guitar
- Joe Shirk - Keyboards, Backing Vocals
- Jeremy Redmon - Guitar, Backing Vocals
- Brian Beihl - Drums

== Charts ==
=== Weekly charts ===
Weekly chart performance for "God Is in This Story"
| Chart (2022–2023) | Peak position |
|---|---|
| US Christian Songs (Billboard) | 1 |
| US Christian Airplay (Billboard) | 1 |
| US Christian AC (Billboard) | 2 |

=== Year-end charts ===
Year-end chart performance for "God Is in This Story"
| Chart (2022) | Position |
|---|---|
| US Christian Songs (Billboard) | 33 |
| US Christian Airplay (Billboard) | 29 |
| US Christian AC (Billboard) | 28 |
| Chart (2023) | Position |
| US Christian Songs (Billboard) | 22 |
| US Christian Airplay (Billboard) | 29 |
| US Christian AC (Billboard) | 36 |

== Certifications ==
| Region | Certification | Certified units/sales |
|---|---|---|
| United States (RIAA) | Gold | 500,000^{‡} |
^{‡} Sales+streaming figures based on certification alone.

== Release history ==
Release dates and formats for "God Is in This Story"
| Region | Date | Format | Label | Ref. |
|---|---|---|---|---|
| Various | June 10, 2022 | Digital download; streaming | Centricity Music | |
| United States | July 15, 2022 | Christian radio | Centricity Music; Word Entertainment | |
