= Megan Woods (singer) =

American musician

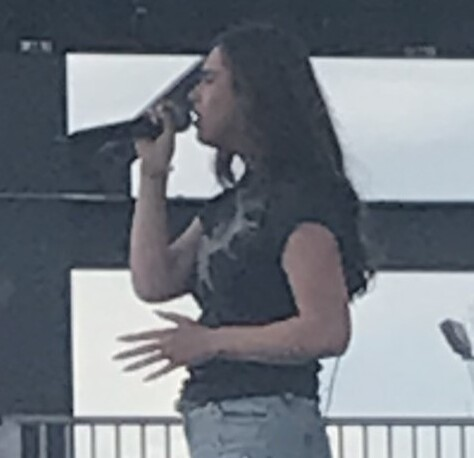
- Woods in 2025

Background information
- Born: March 1, 2001 (age 25)
- Origin: Massachusetts, United States
- Genres: pop; Contemporary Christian
- Occupations: singer; songwriter
- Years active: 2024–present
- Label: Fair Trade Services
- Website: meganwoodsofficial.com

Megan Woods is a Christian contemporary pop singer-songwriter from Northern Massachusetts.

== Career ==
In 2022, Woods signed with Fair Trade Services.

She released her debut single, "The Truth", on May 31, 2024. The song achieved significant success, including reaching peaks of No. 4 on the Billboard Hot Christian Songs chart, No. 23 on the Christian Streaming Songs chart, No. 2 on the Christian Airplay and Adult Contemporary Airplay charts, and No. 1 on the Christian Digital Song Sales chart. It was considered by CCM Magazine to be the biggest debut single in two and a half years. On October 25, 2024, she released her second single, "Prayer and a Bible".

In 2025, Woods was featured on "Find Me Here", with Sherwin Gardner, released January 3, 2025. On January 10, 2025, she was featured on a version of "Let It Begin", with Big Daddy Weave and Ben Fuller. In 2025, she was named one of Pandora's Artists to Watch for 2025. On March 12, 2025, Woods appeared at the Grand Ole Opry. On March 22, 2025, she reached No. 8 on the Billboard Emerging Artists chart.

== Discography ==
=== Studio albums ===
List of studio albums with selected chart positions
Title	Details	Peak chart positions
Title	Details	US Christ.
Megan Woods	Released: October 9, 2026; Label: Fair Trade; Formats: CD, digital download, streaming	28

=== Extended plays ===
List of extended plays with selected chart positions
Title	Details
The Truth	Released: October 17, 2025; Label: Fair Trade/Columbia; Formats: Digital download, streaming

=== Singles ===
==== As lead artist ====
Title	Year	Peak chart positions						Certifications	Album
Title	Year	US Digital	US Christ	US Christ Air	US Christ AC	US Christ Digital	US Christ Stream	Certifications	Album
"The Truth"	2024	18	4	2	2	1	23	RIAA: Gold	Megan Woods
"I Believe You"	2025	—	19	11	13	10	—		Megan Woods
"Heaven Down Here"	2026	—	32	21	15	—	—		Megan Woods
"—" denotes a recording that did not chart or was not released in that territory.

==== As featured artist ====
Title	Year	Peak chart positions			Album
Title	Year	US Christ	US Christ Air	US Christ AC	Album
"Find Me Here" (Sherwin Gardner featuring Megan Woods)	2025	—	—	—	Non-album single
"Let It Begin" (Big Daddy Weave featuring Ben Fuller and Megan Woods)	2025	15	5	7	Let It Begin
"—" denotes a recording that did not chart or was not released in that territory.

=== Other charted songs ===
Title	Year	Peak chart positions	Album
Title	Year	US Christ	Album
"Living Miracle"	2026	44	Megan Woods

=== Promotional singles ===
Title	Year	Album
"Prayer and a Bible"	2024	Megan Woods

== Tours ==
=== As headlining act ===
- The Truth Tour (with Caleb & John and Jeremy Rosado, 2026)

=== As featured act ===
- Let It Begin Tour (with Big Daddy Weave, 2025).

== Accolades ==
Year	Nominee / work	Organizion	Category	Result	Ref.
2025	Megan Woods	Pandora Music Awards	Artists to Watch	Won	
2025	"The Truth"	GMA Dove Awards	Song of the Year	Nominated	
2025	"Let It Begin" (with Big Daddy Weave and Ben Fuller)	We Love Awards	Collaboration of the Year	Nominated	
2026	Megan Woods	GMA Dove Awards	New Artist of the Year	Pending	
