= Hannah Kerr =

American Christian musician (born 1997)

- Birth name: Hannah Elizabeth Kerr
- Born: January 6, 1997 (age 28); Buffalo, New York, U.S.
- Origin: Nashville, Tennessee, U.S.
- Genres: Worship · CCM
- Occupation: Singer · songwriter
- Instrument: Vocals
- Years active: 2015–present
- Labels: Black River · M2T
- Website: hannahkerrmusic.com

Hannah Elizabeth Kerr (born January 6, 1997) is an American contemporary Christian musician. She released I Stand Here, on M2T (Made to Thrive) Records, in 2015, a record label founded by Mark Hall of Casting Crowns. The single, "I Stand Here", placed on the Billboard magazine Christian Airplay chart.

== Early and personal life ==
Hannah Elizabeth Kerr was born on January 6, 1997, in Buffalo, New York, the daughter of Gordon and Kimberly Kerr (née, Vogan), whose father is the CEO of Black River Entertainment. She relocated to Nashville, Tennessee, during the summer before her first year in high school commenced.

== Music career ==
=== 2015–2016: Early career ===
She started her music recording career in 2015, with the extended play, I Stand Here, that was released on October 16, 2015, by M2T (Made to Thrive) Records, a division of Black River Entertainment, a record label founded by Casting Crowns frontman Mark Hall. Her debut single, "I Stand Here", charted on the Billboard magazine Christian Airplay chart at No. 49. It later rose to No. 47, its peak.

=== 2016–present: Overflow ===
On September 24, 2016, Kerr released her debut studio album, Overflow. The second single off the album, Undivided, became her second charting song on the Christian Airplay chart, peaking at No. 41. Kerr released a cover of Judy Garland's Have Yourself a Merry Little Christmas on November 4, 2016. The song debuted on the Hot Christian Songs chart at Number 40, becoming her first entry on the chart. It also peaked at No. 15 on the Christian Airplay chart, her highest charting single on that chart, so far. "Radiate" was chosen as the third single from Overflow. The song peaked at No. 35 on the Hot Christian Songs chart and No. 27 on the Christian Airplay chart, respectively. On August 7, 2017, "Warrior" was released as the fourth single from Overflow, along with a lyric video. Kerr performed the song live, being released to her YouTube channel. The song peaked at No. 20 on the Hot Christian Songs chart.

In 2024, Kerr accompanied Christian band Big Daddy Weave for the spring leg of their ongoing Heaven Changes Everything tour.

== Discography ==
=== Studio albums ===
Title	Details	Peak chart positions		Certifications (sales threshold)
Title	Details	US	US Christ	Certifications (sales threshold)
Overflow	Released: September 24, 2016; Label: M2T Records; Formats: CD, digital download, streaming	—	30	
Christmas Eve in Bethlehem	Released: October 18, 2018; Label: Black River Christian; Format: CD, streaming	—	—	
As I Am	Released: August 30, 2024; Label: Curb Records; Formats: CD, digital download, streaming	—	—	
"—" denotes a recording that did not chart or was not released in that territory.

=== Extended plays ===
Title	Details	Peak chart positions		Certifications (sales threshold)
Title	Details	US	US Christ	Certifications (sales threshold)
I Stand Here	Released: October 16, 2015; Label: M2T Records; Format: CD, streaming	—	—	
Emmanuel	Released: October 20, 2017; Label: M2T; Format: CD, streaming	—	—	
Listen More	Released: September 13, 2019; Format: CD (tour only), digital download, streaming	—	—	
"—" denotes a recording that did not chart or was not released in that territory.

=== Singles ===
Title	Year	Peak chart positions							Album
Title	Year	US AC	US Christ	US Christ Air	US Christ AC	US Christ Digital	UK Indie	UK Cross	Album
"I Stand Here"	2016	—	—	47	—	—	—	—	Overflow
"Undivided"	2016	—	—	41	—	—	—	—	Overflow
"Have Yourself a Merry Little Christmas"	2017	—	—	15	26	—	—	—	Christmas Eve in Bethlehem
"Radiate"	2017	—	35	27	25	—	—	—	Overflow
"Warrior"	2017	—	20	15	14	10	—	—	Overflow
"Winter Wonderland"	2018	30	— (Note: "Winter Wonderland" did not enter the Billboard Hot Christian Songs, but peaked at No. 24 on the Billboard Christian Streaming Songs)	37	20	—	22	—	Christmas Eve in Bethlehem
"Glimpse"	2018	—	—	—	—	—	—	—	Listen More (EP)
"Split the Sea"	2018	—	22	18	21	—	—	—	Non-album single
"In the Meantime"	2019	—	—	—	—	—	—	—	Listen More (EP)
"Ordinary"	2020	—	37	28	30	—	—	—	Listen More (EP)
"Same God"	2021	—	37	30	25	—	—	—	Non-album single
"Grave"	2021	—	—	—	—	—	—	—	Non-album single
"Forever Evergreen"	2021	—	—	39	27	—	—	—	Christmas Eve in Bethlehem (deluxe edition)
"Sleigh Ride"	2022	—	—	45	—	—	—	—	Joy to the World
"Joy to the World"	2022	—	—	—	—	—	—	—	Joy to the World
"Changed"	2024	—	—	—	—	—	—	—	As I Am
"If I Were You"	2024	—	—	—	—	—	—	99	As I Am
"Church Heart"	2024	—	—	—	—	—	—	—	As I Am
"As I Am"	2024	—	—	—	—	—	—	—	As I Am
"It Came Upon a Midnight Clear" (with Austin French)	2024	—	—	21	13	—	—	—	Non-album single
"—" denotes a recording that did not chart or was not released in that territory.

=== Other charted songs ===
Title	Year	Peak chart positions		Album
Title	Year	US Christ Air	US Christ AC	Album
"O Come O Come Emmanuel"	2017	50	30	Christmas Eve in Bethlehem
"Christmas Eve in Bethlehem"	2017	46	24	Christmas Eve in Bethlehem
"Emmanuel"	2018	—	28	Christmas Eve in Bethlehem
"White Christmas"	2018	48	27	Christmas Eve in Bethlehem
"Here to Stay" (with Cochren and Co.)	2020	21	14	Christmas Eve in Bethlehem (deluxe edition)
"I'll Be Home for Christmas"	2023	27	25	Joy to the World
"—" denotes a recording that did not chart or was not released in that territory.
