= One and Only (Big Daddy Weave album) =

Studio album by Big Daddy Weave
- Released: July 30, 2002
- Genre: Contemporary Christian music, Christian rock
- Length: 47:12
- Label: Fervent
- Producer: Jeromy Deibler

Big Daddy Weave chronology
Neighborhoods (2001)	One and Only (2002)	Fields of Grace (2003)

Professional ratings
Review scores
Source	Rating
AllMusic	3/5 stars
Cross Rhythms	10/10 stars

One and Only is the second studio album by Christian rock band Big Daddy Weave. This was their first release with a major label in Fervent Records. It was released on July 30, 2002. This album charted at No. 22 on the Billboard's Independent Albums chart on August 17, 2002.

== Track listing ==
#	Title	Length	Composer
1	"In Christ"	3:52	Mike Weaver
2	"Friend Like You"	3:36	Weaver
3	"One and Only"	4:19	Weaver
4	"Neighborhoods"	4:32	Weaver
5	"Being in Love With You"	3:29	Weaver
6	"Audience Of One"	5:26	Weaver
7	"Never Goin' Back"	3:36	Jeromy Redmon, Weaver
8	"Sacrifice"	5:39	Weaver
9	"Exalted Forever" (featuring Jennifer Deibler, and Brian Smith of FFH)	3:22	Weaver
10	"Rest"	9:18	Weaver

== Personnel ==
Big Daddy Weave

- Mike Weaver – lead vocals, acoustic guitars, background vocals
- Jeremy Redmon – electric guitars, background vocals
- Jay Weaver – bass, background vocals (7)
- Jeff Jones – drums
- Joe Shirk – saxophones

Additional Musicians

- Byron Hagen – acoustic piano, keyboards, Hammond B3 organ
- Ken Lewis – percussion
- Jason Trimble – live loops (3, 8, 9)
- Shelley Nirider – guest vocals (8)
- Jennifer Deibler – background vocals (9)
- Brian Smith – background vocals (9)

Choir (Track 2) and Handclaps (Track 5)

- Michael Boggs
- Jennifer Deibler
- Jannell Els
- Kandice Kirkham
- Christy Kroeker
- Matt Kroeker
- Carly O'Quinn
- Alyson Smith
- Brian Smith
- Betsy Trimble
- Jason Trimble

Party Vocals (Track 4)

- Anna Redmon
- Jeremy Redmon
- Jay Weaver
- Mike Weaver

=== Production ===
- Jeromy Deibler – producer, A&R direction, vocal recording
- Susan Riley – executive producer, A&R direction
- Julian Kindred – band track recording, mixing (4, 5, 7, 9, 10)
- Joey Turner – additional band track recording, band track recording assistant, digital editing, transfers
- James Felver – percussion recording, vocal recording
- Tom Laune – mixing (1–3, 6, 8)
- Tony High – mix assistant (4, 5, 7, 9, 10)
- J.C. Monterrosa – mix assistant (4, 5, 7, 9, 10)
- Hank Williams – mastering
- Carly O'Quinn – production coordinator
- Tim Parker – art direction, design
- Russ Harrington – photography
- Stephanie McBrayer – stylist
- Melissa Schleicher – hair, make-up

Studios

- Recorded at OmniSound Studios (Nashville, Tennessee) and Dark Horse Recording Studio (Franklin, Tennessee).
- Tracks 1–3, 6 & 8 mixed at Bridgeway Studios (Nashville, Tennessee).
- Tracks 4, 5, 7, 9 & 10 mixed at Sound Kitchen (Franklin, Tennessee).
- Mastered at MasterMix (Nashville, Tennessee).
