= Ben Fuller (singer) =

American singer-songwriter (born 1987)

- Born: February 10, 1987 (age 39)
- Origin: Vermont, U.S.
- Genre: CCM
- Occupation: Singer-songwriter
- Instruments: Vocals, Guitar
- Years active: 2017-present
- Label: Provident Label Group
- Website: benfullerofficial.com

Ben Fuller is an American Contemporary Christian music singer-songwriter based in Nashville, signed to Provident Label Group.

== Background ==
Fuller grew up on his family's dairy farm in southern Vermont. He began singing when he was young living on the farm. He played his first show in 2017 at a small bar called Sherry's Place. Soon afterwards, he decided to move to Nashville to pursue a career as a singer and songwriter. An early single "Spark," which he wrote about dairy farmer Romaine Tenney from Ascutney, Vermont northeast of Bennington, gained Fuller some radio airplay. Fuller released a few more singles from 2017-2019 which gained him some popularity online. In 2020, he released his first album of 10 songs titled ‘Witness’.

In 2022, he was signed to Provident Entertainment. He released his first single 'Who I Am', in March 2022. The album 'Who I Am' was released in September 2022. "Who I Am" gained more than 20 million streams while Fuller was also named one of the Christian/Gospel Artists to Watch in 2023 by Pandora. "Who I Am" was #1 on multiple charts including 1 week #1 at Billboard Airplay, 5 non-consecutive weeks #1 at Billboard ACI, 2 consecutive weeks #1 at Billboard AC Monitored, and 1 week #1 at Mediabase AC Monitored.

In 2023, Fuller joined Casting Crowns on The Healer Tour in Spring of 2023. Later that year, Fuller was to tour with We Are Messengers. Fuller announced a new album due on October 20, 2023 along with the single "If I Got Jesus."

== Discography ==
=== Studio albums ===
Title	Details	Peak chart positions
Title	Details	US Christ
Witness	Released: 2020; Label: Independent; Formats: CD	—
Ben Fuller	Released: October 20, 2023; Label: Essential, Provident/Sony; Formats: CD, digital download, streaming	40
Walk Through Fire	Released: June 6, 2025; Label: Essential, Provident/Sony; Formats: CD, DL, streaming	4
"—" denotes a recording that did not chart or was not released in that territory.

=== Extended plays ===
Title	Details	Peak chart positions
Title	Details	US Christ
Who I Am	Released: September 30, 2022; Label: Essential, Providen/Soy; Formats: CD, DL, streaming	39
"—" denotes a recording that did not chart or was not released in that territory.

=== Singles ===
Title	Year	Peak chart postiions				Certifications (sales thresholds)	Album
Title	Year	US Christ	US Christ Air	US Christ AC	US Christ Digital	Certifications (sales thresholds)	Album
"If it Hadn’t Been For Love"	2017	—	—	—	—		Non-album singles
"Ex-to-See"	2017	—	—	—	—		Non-album singles
"Dirt Road to Nashville"	2018	—	—	—	—		Non-album singles
"Spark"	2018	—	—	—	—		Non-album singles
"Lion Eyes"	2018	—	—	—	—		Non-album singles
"Me & Katelyn"	2019	—	—	—	—		Non-album singles
"'Town Called Grace"	2019	—	—	—	—		Witness
"Find My Faith"	2019	—	—	—	—		Witness
"Witness"	2019	—	—	—	—		Witness
"Fork in the Road"	2019	—	—	—	—		Witness
"Reckless Love" (with Gabe Woodrow)	2020	—	—	—	—		Witness
"Mercy" (Song Session)	2020	—	—	—	—		Non-album singles
"Who I Am" (Acoustic)	2020	—	—	—	—		Non-album singles
"O Come All Ye Faithful"	2020	—	—	—	—		Non-album singles
"Who I Am"	2020	4	1	1	22	RIAA: Gold	Ben Fuller
"Wide Awake"	2020	—	—	—	—		Ben Fuller
"Proud"	2020	—	—	—	—		Ben Fuller
"Chasing Rebel"	2022	—	—	—	—		Ben Fuller
"But the Cross"	2022	—	—	—	—		Ben Fuller
"East to West" (Casting Crowns cover)	2023	—	—	—	—		Lifesongs: A Celebration of the First 20 Years
"If I Got Jesus"	2023	13	15	19	2	RIAA: Gold	Ben Fuller Walk Through Fire
"Black Sheep" (original or with KB)	2024	23	16	15	3		Walk Through Fire
"Let It Begin" (with Megan Woods and Big Daddy Weave)	2025	15	5	7	—		Let It Begin
"Turn"	2025	35	22	18	—		Walk Through Fire
"If It Was Up to Me" (with Carrie Underwood)"	2025	17	12	19	6		Walk Through Fire
"Since Jesus"	2025	—	—	—	—		Walk Through Fire
"Wait For Me" (with Zach Williams)	2026	10	1	2	—		Non-album single
"—" denotes a recording that did not chart or was not released in that territory.

=== Other charted songs ===
Title	Year	Peak chart postitions	Album
Title	Year	US Christ	Album
"Walk Through Fire"	2025	40	Walk Through Fire
"—" denotes a recording that did not chart or was not released in that territory.

== Awards and nominations ==
Year	Organization	Nominee / work	Category	Result	Ref.
2025	We Love Awards	"Deeper"	Country / Roots Song of the Year	Nominated	
2025	We Love Awards	"Let It Begin" (Big Daddy Weave featuring Ben Fuller and Megan Woods)	Collaboration of the Year	Nominated	
2026	Dove Awards	"Black Sheep"	Country/Roots Recorded Song of the Year	Nominated	
2026	Dove Awards	Walk Through Fire	Pop/Contemporary Album of the Year	Nominated	
