= Fields of Grace =

Studio album by Big Daddy Weave
- Released: September 30, 2003
- Studios: The Bennett House and The Playground (Franklin, Tennessee); Howard Johnson's - Room 150 (Chattanooga, Tennessee); The Linden Valley Conference Center - Rooms 116 & 117 (Linden, Tennessee); Integrity Studios and Redwood Productions (Mobile, Alabama); The Weaver House (Gulf Breeze, Florida); Soundtown Digital (Dallas, Texas)
- Genres: Contemporary Christian music, Christian rock
- Length: 37:40
- Label: Fervent
- Producers: Jeremy Redmon; Mike Weaver

Big Daddy Weave chronology
One and Only (2002)	Fields of Grace (2003)	What I Was Made For (2005)

Professional ratings
Review scores
Source	Rating
Allmusic	4/5 stars
Cross Rhythms	8/10 stars
Jesus Freak Hideout	3/5 stars
The Phantom Tollbooth	5/5 stars

Fields of Grace is the third studio album by contemporary Christian music band Big Daddy Weave. It was their second release with a major label, Fervent Records. It was released on September 30, 2003. The album charted on the following Billboard's charts on October 18, 2003: No. 177 on Billboard 200, No. 8 on Christian Albums, and No. 7 on Top Heatseekers.

== Album ==
=== Track listing ===
#	Title	Length	Composer
1	"Set Me Free"	3:11	Weaver
2	"Why"	3:14	Weaver
3	"New Every Morning"	3:28	Weaver
4	"Fields of Grace"	3:25	Darrell Evans
5	"Heart Cries Holy"	5:17	Weaver
6	"Everything You Are"	3:22	Weaver
7	"Be Your Everything"	5:13	Weaver
8	"Pharisee"	2:43	Weaver
9	"Prelude"	0:30	Weaver
10	"Completely Free"	3:33	Weaver
11	"You in Me"	3:39	Weaver

== Personnel ==
Big Daddy Weave

- Mike Weaver – lead and backing vocals, acoustic guitars
- Jeremy Redmon – electric guitars
- Jay Weaver – bass guitar
- Jeff Jones – drums
- Joe Shirk – saxophones

Additional Musicians

- Jeff Roach – keyboards
- Ken Lewis – percussion
- Will Hunt – loop programming (2)
- Paul Nelson – cello
- DeAna Whalen – violin
- Jenee Keener – violin

=== Production ===
- Susan Riley – executive producer
- Jim Scherer – executive producer
- Jeromy Deibler – A&R
- Mike Weaver – producer, overdub recording
- Jeremy Redmon – producer, track recording (10), overdub recording
- Jim Dineen – tracking engineer (1–9, 11), overdub recording
- Chris Clayton – overdub recording
- Chuck Harris – overdub recording
- Keith Edlin – second engineer
- Jimmy Jerrigan – second engineer
- David Steit – second engineer
- Shane D. Wilson – mixing at Pentavarit (Nashville, Tennessee)
- Chris Henning – mix assistant
- Stephen Marcussen – mastering at Marcussen Mastering (Hollywood, California)
- Holly Durtschi – art direction
- Ron Roark – art direction, design, additional photography
- Russ Harrington – photography
- Stephanie McBrayer – styling, wardrobe
