= The Lion and the Lamb (song) =

Single by Big Daddy Weave

from the album Beautiful Offerings
- Released: March 25, 2016
- Recorded: 2015
- Genre: CCM; pop rock; worship
- Length: 5:06
- Label: Word, Curb, Fervent
- Songwriters: Leeland Mooring, Brenton Brown, Brian Johnson

Big Daddy Weave singles chronology
"My Story" (2015)	"The Lion and the Lamb" (2016)	"Jesus I Believe" (2017)

"The Lion and the Lamb" is a single from the contemporary Christian music group Big Daddy Weave. It peaked at No. 2 on Christian Airplay and No. 2 on Billboard Hot Christian Songs. The Lion and the Lamb is Big Daddy Weave's 15th top 10 song.

The song was written by Leeland Mooring, Brenton Brown and Brian Johnson and was initially released by Bethel Music and Leeland as a part of its successful release, Have It All.

== Charts ==
=== Weekly charts ===
Chart (2016)	Peak position
US Christian AC (Billboard)	2
US Christian Airplay (Billboard)	2
US Hot Christian Songs (Billboard)	7
US Christian AC Indicator (Billboard)	11
US Christian Soft AC (Billboard)	8

=== Year-end charts ===
Chart (2016)	Peak position
US Christian Songs (Billboard)	23
US Christian Airplay (Billboard)	19
US Christian AC (Billboard)	20
Chart (2017)	Peak position
US Christian Songs (Billboard)	47

== Certifications ==
Region	Certification	Certified units/sales
United States (RIAA)	Gold	500,000^{‡}
^{‡} Sales+streaming figures based on certification alone.
