= Patrick Mayberry =

US singer, songwriter, and worship pastor

- Born: October 17, 1984 (age 41); Cookeville, Tennessee, U.S.
- Genre: Contemporary worship music · CCM
- Occupations: Singer; songwriter; worship pastor
- Instruments: Vocals; guitar
- Years active: 2018–present
- Labels: Centricity Music; Provident
- Spouse: Jenny Mayberry
- Website: Official website

Patrick Mayberry (born October 17, 1984) is an American Christian worship singer, songwriter, guitarist and worship pastor.

== Career ==
Mayberry was born in Cookeville, Tennessee, to Ronnie and Margaret Mayberry. He grew up as part of the Church of Christ denomination. Mayberry learned to play guitar while listening to Jimi Hendrix and Grateful Dead, while also playing with friends from his local YoungLife chapter.

After visiting a Passion Conference in 2006 and buying a Chris Tomlin album, Mayberry started to work on his songwriting skills. He also started leading worship at his local college ministry. Mayberry then moved from Tennessee to Chicago to work at Soul City Church. After some time, he was signed by Centricity Music and returned to Tennessee.

Mayberry has been releasing singles and EPs since 2018. His first full album, Wild Faith, was released in 2023 with the song "Lead On Good Shepherd" charting in the Billboard Christian Songs chart in 2024.

Mayberry was nominated for Best New Artist for the 2025 GMA Dove Award.

== Discography ==
=== Charted singles ===
| Title | Year | Peak chart positions | Album |
| Title | Year | US Christ. AC | Album |
|---|---|---|---|
| "Praise the Lord" | 2025 | 28 | Non-album single |
