= O What a King =

2022 single by Katy Nichole

Single by Katy Nichole
- Released: October 21, 2022
- Genre: CCM; Christmas
- Length: 3:14
- Label: Centricity Music
- Songwriters: Brandon Heath; Jeff Pardo; Katy Nichole
- Producer: Jeff Pardo

Katy Nichole singles chronology
"God Is Love" (2022)	"O What a King" (2022)

Music videos
- "O What a King" (Acoustic) on YouTube
- "O What a King" (Lyrics) on YouTube

"O What a King" is a song by American contemporary Christian music singer Katy Nichole, released on October 21, 2022, as a standalone single. Nichole co-wrote the song with Brandon Heath and Jeff Pardo.

"O What a King" peaked at number one on both the US Hot Christian Songs chart and on the Bubbling Under Hot 100 chart.

== Composition ==
"O What a King" is composed in the key of C with a tempo of 73 beats per minute and a musical time signature of 4/4.

== Commercial performance ==
"O What a King" made its debut at number 40 on the US Christian Airplay chart dated December 3, 2022. The song peaked at number 21 on the Christian Airplay chart.

"O What a King" debuted at number 30 on the US Hot Christian Songs chart dated December 10, 2022, The song peaked at number 14 on the Hot Christian Songs chart.

== Music videos ==
Katy Nichole released the official lyric video of "O What a King" through her YouTube channel on October 21, 2022. Worship Together published the acoustic performance video of "O What a King" via YouTube on December 7, 2022.

== Track listing ==
"O What a King"
No.	Title	Length
1.	"O What a King"	3:14
2.	"O Holy Night"	3:14
Total length:		6:28

== Charts ==
Chart performance for "O What a King"
Chart (2022)	Peak position
US Christian Songs (Billboard)	14
US Christian Airplay (Billboard)	21
US Christian AC (Billboard)	6

== Release history ==
Release dates and formats for "O What a King"
Region	Date	Format	Label	Ref.
Various	October 21, 2022	Digital download; streaming	Centricity Music	
