= Every Time I Breathe =

Studio album by Big Daddy Weave
- Released: September 26, 2006
- Recorded: 2006
- Studio: Integrity Studios (Mobile, Alabama); Big Red Studios (Portland, Oregon); Red 91 Productions (Mt. Juliet, Tennessee); Destin Recording (Destin, Florida)
- Genre: CCM; Christian rock
- Length: 42:28
- Label: Fervent; Warner; Curb
- Producer: Jeremy Redmon; Big Daddy Weave

Big Daddy Weave chronology
What I Was Made For (2005)	Every Time I Breathe (2006)	What Life Would Be Like (2008)

Professional ratings
Review scores
Source	Rating
Cross Rhythms	8/10 stars
Jesus Freak Hideout	2/5 stars

Every Time I Breathe is the fourth album by the Mobile, Alabama based CCM/Christian rock band, Big Daddy Weave. It was released on September 26, 2006. This album charted on the following Billboard's charts on October 14, 2006: No. 18 on Christian Albums, and No. 10 on Top Heatseekers.

== Track listing ==
#	Title	Length	Composer	Notes
1	"Let It Rise"	4:34	Holland Davis	
2	"Every Time I Breathe"	3:46	Andy Cloninger, Michael Farren, Mike Weaver	
3	"Only Jesus"	3:14	Weaver	
4	"All for You"	3:45	Cloninger, Weaver	
5	"Hold Me Jesus"	3:56	Rich Mullins	Rich Mullins cover
6	"The Only One"	3:19	Cloninger, Weaver	
7	"All the Same"	5:34	Weaver	
8	"When I See You"	3:36	Farren, Michael Olsen, Weaver	
9	"Wait"	3:40		
10	"Who You Are to Me"	3:09	Michael Boggs, Weaver	
11	"Trust and Obey"	3:55	Public Domain	

== Personnel ==
Big Daddy Weave

- Mike Weaver – lead and backing vocals, acoustic guitars, arrangements (11)
- Jeremy Redmon – electric guitars
- Joe Shirk – keyboards, saxophone
- Jay Weaver – bass
- Jeff Jones – drums

Additional Musicians

- Matt Gilder – keyboards
- Jonathan Chu – violin (2, 5)
- PureNRG – kids choir (5)

=== Production ===
- Josh Bailey – executive producer
- Susan Riley – executive producer
- Big Daddy Weave – producers
- Jeremy Redmon – producer, tracking engineer (1, 4, 7–11), overdub recording
- Chuck Harris – tracking engineer (2, 3, 5, 6)
- Dave Cox – tracking engineer (4, 7–11)
- Greg Klimetz – BGV recording (4, 7–11)
- Tim Hochstedler – tracking assistant (2, 3, 5, 6)
- Jerome Mason – tracking assistant (4, 7–11)
- Whitney Partridge – tracking assistant (4, 7–11)
- Shane D. Wilson – mixing at Pentavarit (Nashville, Tennessee)
- Alice Smith – mix coordinator
- Andrew Mendelson – mastering at Georgetown Masters (Nashville, Tennessee)
- Katherine Petillo – creative director
- Gary Dorsey – package design, photography
- Kaysie Dorsey – package design, photography
- Lucy Santamassino – hair, make-up

== Radio singles ==
- "Let It Rise"
- "Every Time I Breathe"

== Bonus features ==
The CD was released as an enhanced CD, which includes:

- Lyrics to the songs on the album as MediaShout files.
- Every Time I Breathe Music Video
- B-roll footage of the band on the road
- Chord charts

== Music videos ==
- Every Time I Breathe (July 26, 2006)
