= Beautiful Offerings =

Studio album by Big Daddy Weave
- Released: September 18, 2015
- Studio: Superphonic (Berry Hill, Tennessee); Red 91 Productions (Mt. Juliet, Tennessee); Little Big Sound (Nashville, Tennessee)
- Genre: Worship, contemporary Christian music, Christian rock, pop rock
- Length: 48:25
- Label: Word, Curb, Fervent
- Producer: Jeremy Redmon: Tedd T

Big Daddy Weave chronology
Love Come to Life (2012)	Beautiful Offerings (2015)	When the Light Comes (2019)

Beautiful Offerings is the seventh studio album by Big Daddy Weave. Word Records alongside Curb Records and Fervent Records released the album on September 18, 2015.

== Critical reception ==
Professional ratings
Review scores
Source	Rating
365 Days of Inspiring Media	4.5/5 stars
CCM Magazine	4/5 stars
The Christian Beat	4.5/5 stars
Jesus Freak Hideout	3/5 stars
New Release Today	4.5/5 stars
Worship Leader	4.5/5 stars

Awarding the album four stars from CCM Magazine, Jamie Walker states, "Beautiful Offerings features eleven originals that continue the band's tradition of offering rich melodic hooks perfectly paired with thought-provoking and worshipful lyrics...With Beautiful Offerings, Big Daddy Weave once again powerfully presents in their own unique way the live-giving messages of hope and surrender." Kevin Davis, giving the album four and a half stars at New Release Today, writes, "This new album demonstrates once again the passion and energy that have made Big Daddy Weave one of Christian music's most compelling acts...These are very passionate worship songs with biblically based lyrics sung with vocal sincerity and reverence...This album is Big Daddy Weave's crowning achievement and one of my top albums of the year."

Indicating in a four and a half star review by Worship Leader, Randy Cross responds, "Beautiful Offerings is the next 'classic' from the band that continues to define what it is to be a Christian pop artist...Sometimes introspective, always deep and worshipful, Beautiful Offerings is an unadulterated celebration of the band's relationship with Jesus". Rating the album three stars from Jesus Freak Hideout, Alex Caldwell describes, "The early songs on Beautiful Offerings show that Big Daddy Weave can stretch the boundaries of their sound when they want to, but half of the songs here sound like they could have been performed by ten other bands."

Joshua Andre, indicating in a four and a half star review for 365 Days of Inspiring Media, recognizes, "Beautiful Offerings is one of the stand out albums of the year, in my opinion, as well as the band’s most complete and mature work to date, with plenty of genres encompassed throughout." Signaling in a four and a half star review by The Christian Beat, Abby Baracskai replies, "Big Daddy Weave continues to deliver new and creative arrangements, powerful lyrics and compelling vocals with Beautiful Offerings."

== Track listing ==
No.	Title	Writer(s)	Length
1.	"Beautiful Offering"	Mike Weaver, Jason Ingram	4:32
2.	"My Story"	Ingram, Weaver	4:38
3.	"I Belong to God"	Weaver, Allison Mellon, Matt Redman	4:22
4.	"Come Sit Down"	Ingram, Weaver, Seth Mosley	5:35
5.	"The Lion and the Lamb"	Brenton Brown, Brian Johnson, Leeland Mooring	5:06
6.	"Heaven Is Here"	Weaver, Benji Cowart, Elias Dummer	4:21
7.	"It's Already Done"	Weaver, Josh Wilson	4:02
8.	"I Will Go"	Ingram, Mosley, Weaver	3:34
9.	"Praise You"	Weaver, Redman	4:15
10.	"Glory Unspeakable"	Weaver, Ed Cash, Jose Manwell Reyes	3:34
11.	"You're Gonna Love Him"	Weaver, Cowart, Tedd T	4:26
Total length:			48:25

Deluxe edition
No.	Title	Writer(s)	Length
12.	"Welcome"	Redman, Weaver	4:01
13.	"When You Love Somebody"	Ingram, Weaver, Matt Maher	3:36
14.	"Jesus I Believe"	Ingram, Weaver	4:37
15.	"Good Good Father" (live)	Pat Barrett, Tony Brown	5:44
Total length:			66:23

== Personnel ==
Big Daddy Weave

- Mike Weaver – vocals, guitars
- Jeremy Redmon – keyboard programming, guitars, banjo, mandolin, additional drums, trumpet, vocals
- Joe Shirk – keyboards, saxophone, vocals
- Jay Weaver – bass, vocals
- Brian Beihl – drums, percussion, vocals

Additional Musicians

- Matt Gilder – keyboards (1–8, 10, 13)
- David Leonard – keyboards (1, 4, 6–9, 11), backing vocals (3, 6–10, 14)
- Ben Phillips – drums (1–11, 13)
- Matt Nelson – cello (2)
- Luke Brown – backing vocals (1, 4–6, 8, 10, 13)
- Anna Redmon – backing vocals (1, 2)
- Benji Cowart – backing vocals (11)

The Love Sponge Strings (Tracks 1, 2, 12 & 14)

- David Davidson – string arrangements
- David Angell, Monisa Angell, David Davidson, Conni Ellisor, Elizabeth Lamb, Anthony LaMarchina, Sarighani Reist, Mary Kathryn Vanosdale and Karen Winklemann – string players

=== Production ===
- Josh Bailey – A&R
- Jeremy Redmon – producer, overdub recording
- Tedd T – additional producer (11)
- Ben Phillips – tracking engineer
- Baheo "Bobby" Shin – string recording
- Brian Beihl – saxophone overdub recording
- Ainslie Grosser – mixing
- Andrew Bergthold – mix assistant
- Dan Shike – mastering at Tone and Volume (Nashville, Tennessee)
- Nicole Curtis – A&R administration
- Jamie Haymes – A&R administration
- Shane Tarleton – creative director
- Katherine Petillo – art direction, design
- David Molnar – photography
- Anna Redmon – styling
- Kirsten Kelly – grooming
- John Clore – brand management

== Charts ==
Chart (2015)	Peak position
US Billboard 200	164
US Top Christian Albums (Billboard)	4

== Awards and nominations ==
In 2016, 'My Story' was nominated for a Dove Award for 'Pop/Contemporary Recorded Song of the Year'.
