= Where I'm Standing Now =

2021 song by Phil Wickham

Song by Phil Wickham featuring Brandon Lake

from the album Hymn of Heaven
- Released: June 25, 2021
- Genre: Contemporary worship music
- Length: 4:30
- Label: Fair Trade Services
- Songwriters: Phil Wickham; Brandon Lake; Brian Johnson
- Producer: Kyle Lee

Music videos
- "Where I'm Standing Now" on YouTube
- "Where I'm Standing Now" (Acoustic) on YouTube

"Where I'm Standing Now" is a song by American contemporary Christian musician Phil Wickham featuring American contemporary worship musician Brandon Lake. The song was released on June 25, 2021, as the fifth track on Wickham's eighth studio album, Hymn of Heaven (2021). Wickham co-wrote the song with Brandon Lake and Brian Johnson. Kyle Lee produced the track.

"Where I'm Standing Now" peaked at number 41 on the US Christian Airplay chart.

== Background ==
On August 9, 2021, Phil Wickham released the music video of "Where I'm Standing Now" which he said had become one of his "personal favorites" from Hymn of Heaven (2021). Phil Wickham shared the story alongside Brandon Lake, saying that Wickham had shared a song idea with Lake while on tour with Bethel Music, who later suggested to Wickham that they combine it with another song idea from Brian Johnson, and an additional chorus from Lake himself resulting in the final version of the song.

== Critical reception ==
Jonathan Andre, reviewing for 365 Days of Inspiring Media review, saying "Where I'm Standing Now" was one of the songs from Hymn of Heaven which "the potential to be powerful songs sung in churches around the world." Kevin Davis of NewReleaseToday also shared a similar sentiment, saying it was one of the songs on the albums that worship leaders would want to add to their set-lists immediately. Timothy Yap of JubileeCast commented on the song in his review: "The before and after scenarios of how Christ has changed our lives is set in such a beautiful contrast that makes this worship ballad a highlight." Jesus Freak Hideout's Josh Balogh opined that Brandon Lake offered a "big assist" on the song, saying "his [Lake's] grittier, more Americana/alt-rock-leaning voice is a nice complement to Wickham's tenor" in his review. This was also echoed by Abby Thigpen in her Today's Christian Entertainment's review, who said that the duet "adds some variety and nice harmonies."

== Composition ==
"Where I'm Standing Now" is composed in the key of A♭ with a tempo of 78 beats per minute and a musical time signature of 6/8.

== Commercial performance ==
"Where I'm Standing Now" made its debut at number 43 on the US Christian Airplay chart dated February 5, 2022.

== Music videos ==
Phil Wickham availed the audio video of "Where I'm Standing Now" through YouTube on June 25, 2021. Phil Wickham published the official music video for "Where I'm Standing Now" featuring Brandon Lake on August 9, 2021, via YouTube. On August 16, 2021, Phil Wickham released the acoustic performance video of the song featuring Brandon Lake on YouTube.

== Charts ==
Chart performance for "Where I'm Standing Now"
Chart (2022)	Peak position
US Christian Airplay (Billboard)	41
