= In Jesus Name (God of Possible) =

2022 single by Katy Nichole

Single by Katy Nichole

from the EP Katy Nichole
- Released: January 26, 2022
- Genre: CCM; contemporary worship
- Length: 3:42; 3:40 (piano version); 4:16 (live version)
- Label: Centricity Music
- Songwriters: Ethan Hulse; Katy Nichole; Jeff Pardo; David Spencer
- Producer: Jeff Pardo

Katy Nichole singles chronology
"In Jesus Name (God of Possible)" (2022)	"God Is in This Story" (2022)

Live version
- Live version with North Point Worship

North Point Worship singles chronology
"Deliverer" (2022)	"In Jesus Name (God of Possible)" (2022)	"This Is My Song" (2022)

Music videos
- "In Jesus Name (God of Possible)" on YouTube
- "In Jesus Name (God of Possible)" (Piano Version/Lyrics) on YouTube
- "In Jesus Name (God of Possible)" (Song Session) on YouTube

"In Jesus Name (God Of Possible)" is a song by American contemporary Christian music singer Katy Nichole, released on January 26, 2022, as the lead single from her debut extended play, Katy Nichole (2022). Nichole co-wrote the song with Ethan Hulse, Jeff Pardo and David Spencer.

"In Jesus Name (God Of Possible)" peaked at number one on both the US Hot Christian Songs chart and on the Bubbling Under Hot 100 chart. The song was ranked by Billboard as the biggest Christian song in 2022. It has been certified platinum by Recording Industry Association of America (RIAA). It was nominated for the GMA Dove Award for Pop/Contemporary Recorded Song of the Year at the 2022 GMA Dove Awards.

== Background ==
In January 2022, Katy Nichole announced that she was signed with Centricity Music, and released "In Jesus Name (God of Possible)" as her debut single, indicating that her debut studio album was in the works. A snippet of the song's chorus sung by Nichole had been released on TikTok prior to the single's release, garnering over 80 million streams.

== Writing and development ==
Nichole shared the story behind the song, saying:

This song was originally called "God of Possible." The night before I was to go into the writers’ room to create this song, I had a panic attack. I was dealing with a lot of anxiety at the time. I felt God leading me to the piano and I wrote out a little chorus that I brought with me to the writers’ room that God had given me that calmed me down during my panic attack. We went in and the part that I initially meant to be the bridge ended up being the song's chorus, "I pray for your healing/That circumstances will change/I pray that the fear inside will flee in Jesus' name." I decided to post that part of the song to TikTok because it was something I needed now, and it was a prayer that I needed to pray over myself to feel relief and the presence of God. I thought maybe there was one person who needed that as well. I didn't go back to look at the post for hours. When I saw it, the video had reached a lot of people. I knew I needed those words, but I didn’t realize how many other people needed those words.

Nichole further shared that her record label noticed the traction that the song was getting and suggested to her that she write "a song that was a prayer in Jesus' name."

== Composition ==
"In Jesus Name (God of Possible)" is composed in the key of G♭ with a tempo of 71 beats per minute and a musical time signature of 4/4.

== Reception ==
=== Critical response ===
Reviewing for 365 Days Of Inspiring Media, Jonathan Andre gave a positive opinion of the song, saying: "It's a song that embodies hope and encouragement, but also is a reminder to keep singing and to keep asking the bold questions, even if healing doesn't come." Jacob Airey of StudioJake Media wrote a positive review of the song, saying: "The song is a heartwarming and encouraging song. It is a prayerful set of lyrics that remind the listener that someone is always praying for them. I like how she focuses in on the power of Christ and how He loves us as our Savior. Nichole brings a lot of exhortation to you and while the song is simplistic, you will feel encouraged." Briauna Prieto of Peer Magazine wrote a positive review of the song, saying: ""In Jesus' Name (God of Possible)" by Katy Nichole reminds us that strength and endurance only come from the power of Jesus—power that is always ours! Although this song is slow, easy to follow and simple to learn, it contains a huge message, and could serve as a reminder to pray for others."

=== Accolades ===
Awards
Year	Organization	Award	Result	Ref
2022	GMA Dove Awards	Pop/Contemporary Recorded Song of the Year	Nominated	

Year-end lists
Publication	Accolade	Ref.
NewReleaseToday	Best of 2022: Top 10 Songs of the Year	

== Commercial performance ==
"In Jesus Name (God of Possible)" debuted at number four on the Christian Digital Song Sales chart dated February 5, 2022. The following week, the song debuted at number 30 on the US Hot Christian Songs chart dated February 12, 2022, concurrently peaking at number 26 on the Christian Airplay chart, and number one on the Christian Digital Song Sales chart. The song was a breakthrough hit, as it registered in the top ten sector of the Hot Christian Songs chart dated March 12, 2022, at number three. It went on to reach number one on the Hot Christian Songs chart dated March 26, 2022, on the back of significant gains in radio airplay and downloads. The song also concurrently debuted at number 18 on Bubbling Under Hot 100 chart. The song went on to reach number one on the Bubbling Under Hot 100 chart, as well as the Christian Airplay chart dated April 30, 2022.

== Music videos ==
On March 5, 2022, Katy Nichole released the official music video for "In Jesus Name (God of Possible)" on YouTube. The music video was directed by Nathan Schneider and produced by Joshua Wurzelbacher and Alicia St. Gelais.

On March 10, 2022, Essential Worship released an acoustic performance video of "In Jesus Name (God Of Possible)" by Katy Nichole via YouTube. On March 24, 2022, Katy Nichole released the official lyric video for the piano version of the song through YouTube. On May 27, 2022, Katy Nichole released the official audio video for the live version of "In Jesus Name (God of Possible)" with North Point Worship on YouTube.

== Track listing ==
"In Jesus Name (God of Possible)"
No.	Title	Writer(s)	Producer	Length
1.	"In Jesus Name (God of Possible)"	Ethan Hulse; Katy Nichole; Jeff Pardo; David Spencer	Jeff Pardo	3:42

"In Jesus Name (God Of Possible)" [Piano Version]
No.	Title	Length
1.	"In Jesus Name (God of Possible)" (Piano Version)	3:40
2.	"In Jesus Name (God of Possible)"	3:42
Total length:		7:22

"In Jesus Name (God of Possible)" [Live]
No.	Title	Length
1.	"In Jesus Name (God of Possible)" (Live; with North Point Worship)	4:16

== Personnel ==
Adapted from AllMusic.

- Jacob Arnold – drums
- Chris Bevins – editing assistant
- Mike Cervantes – mastering
- Court Clement – guitar
- Nickie Conley – background vocals
- Jason Eskridge – background vocals
- John Mays – A&R
- Wil Merrell – background vocals
- Sean Moffitt – mixing
- Katy Nichole – background vocals, primary artist, vocals
- Jeff Pardo – background vocals, keyboards, piano, producer, programming, synthesizer bass
- Kiley Phillips – background vocals

== Charts ==
=== Weekly charts ===
Weekly chart performance for "In Jesus Name (God of Possible)"
Chart (2022)	Peak position
US Bubbling Under Hot 100 (Billboard)	1
US Christian Songs (Billboard)	1
US Christian Airplay (Billboard)	1
US Christian AC (Billboard)	1

=== Year-end charts ===
Year-end chart performance for "In Jesus Name (God of Possible)"
Chart (2022)	Position
US Christian Songs (Billboard)	1
US Christian Airplay (Billboard)	1
US Christian AC (Billboard)	1
US Digital Song Sales (Billboard)	39
Chart (2023)	Position
US Christian Songs (Billboard)	31

== Certifications ==
Region	Certification	Certified units/sales
United States (RIAA)	Platinum	1,000,000^{‡}
^{‡} Sales+streaming figures based on certification alone.

== Release history ==
Release dates and formats for "In Jesus Name (God of Possible)"
Region	Date	Version	Format	Label	Ref.
Various	January 26, 2022	Original	Digital download; streaming	Centricity Music	
Various	February 25, 2022	Piano	Digital download; streaming	Centricity Music	
Various	May 27, 2022	Live (with North Point Worship)	Digital download; streaming	Centricity Music	
