= House of the Lord (song) =

2021 song by Phil Wickham

Single by Phil Wickham

from the album Hymn of Heaven
- Released: April 2, 2021
- Recorded: 2020
- Genre: Contemporary worship music
- Length: 4:16
- Label: Fair Trade Services
- Songwriters: Phil Wickham; Jonathan Smith
- Producer: Jonathan Smith

Phil Wickham singles chronology
"Battle Belongs" (2020)	"House of the Lord" (2021)	"Hymn of Heaven" (2022)

Music videos
- "House of the Lord" on YouTube
- "House of the Lord" (Acoustic) on YouTube
- "House of the Lord" (Lyrics) on YouTube

"House of the Lord" is a song by American contemporary worship musician Phil Wickham. The song was released on April 2, 2021, as the second single from his eighth studio album, Hymn of Heaven (2021). Wickham co-wrote the song with Jonathan Smith. Jonathan Smith produced the single.

"House of the Lord" peaked at number one on the US Hot Christian Songs chart. The song also went on to peak at number twelve on the Bubbling Under Hot 100 chart. "House of the Lord" received two GMA Dove Award nominations for Song of the Year and Pop/Contemporary Recorded Song of the Year at the 2022 GMA Dove Awards.

== Background ==
On April 2, 2021, Phil Wickham released "House of the Lord" as the second single from his upcoming album, Hymn of Heaven (2021). Wickham shared the story behind the song, saying:

Over the past 12 months I've learned in a deeper way than ever that though happiness comes and goes in Jesus I can always have joy. Cause though happiness is based on circumstances, joy is rooted in identity. It's based on who God says we are! Though we were once beggars, in Jesus we are royalty.

On May 7, 2021, the radio team of Fair Trade Services announced that "House of the Lord" will be serviced to Christian radio in the United States, the official add date for the single slated on July 2, 2021.

== Composition ==
"House of the Lord" is in the key of B♭ major, with a tempo of 86 beats per minute and a musical time signature of 4/4.

== Reception ==
=== Critical response ===
Jonathan Andre of 365 Days of Inspiring Media gave a positive review of the song, saying that it "keeps our focus on things above, to realign from our own immediate circumstances, to being reminded that God is in our midst wherever we are, that His moving in our lives, either through healing physically, mentally, or even spiritually, needs to be declared and recognised, and such a song as this, does this very fact."

=== Accolades ===
Awards
Year	Organization	Award	Result	Ref
2022	GMA Dove Awards	Song of the Year	Nominated	
2022	GMA Dove Awards	Pop/Contemporary Recorded Song of the Year	Nominated	

== Commercial performance ==
"House of the Lord" debuted at No. 35 on the US Hot Christian Songs chart dated April 17, 2021. The song reached number one on the Hot Christian Songs chart dated January 29, 2022, becoming Wickham's first Hot Christian Songs chart number one hit in his career.

"House of the Lord" debuted at number 39 on the US Christian Airplay chart dated June 15, 2021. "House of the Lord" reached number one on the Christian Airplay chart dated October 16, 2021, after twenty weeks, becoming Wickham's fastest ascent to the top of the chart as well as his third chart-topping entry following "Battle Belongs" and "This Is Amazing Grace".

== Music videos ==
The lyric video of "House of the Lord" was published on Phil Wickham's YouTube channel on April 2, 2021. The official music video for "House of the Lord" was availed by Phil Wickham on April 10, 2021, to YouTube. On April 30, 2021, Phil Wickham released the acoustic performance video of the song on YouTube.

== Charts ==
=== Weekly charts ===
Weekly chart performance for "House of the Lord"
Chart (2021)	Peak position
US Bubbling Under Hot 100 (Billboard)	12
US Hot Christian Songs (Billboard)	1
US Christian Airplay (Billboard)	1
US Christian AC (Billboard)	1

=== Year-end charts ===
Year-end chart performance for "House of the Lord"
Chart (2021)	Position
US Christian Songs (Billboard)	20
US Christian Airplay (Billboard)	18
US Christian AC (Billboard)	20
Chart (2022)	Position
US Christian Songs (Billboard)	17
US Christian Airplay (Billboard)	28
US Christian AC (Billboard)	30

== Certifications ==
Region	Certification	Certified units/sales
United States (RIAA)	Gold	500,000^{‡}
^{‡} Sales+streaming figures based on certification alone.

== Release history ==
Release history and formats for "House of the Lord"
Region	Date	Format	Label	Ref.
Various	April 2, 2021	Digital download; streaming	Fair Trade Services	
United States	July 2, 2021	Christian radio	Fair Trade Services	
