= The Young Escape =

American electronic pop band

- Origin: California, United States
- Genres: Christian Pop; electronic; indie pop
- Years active: 2016–present
- Label: Capitol Christian Music Group
- Members: Ryan Johns; McKenna Johns; Kyrsten Johns; Luke Johns
- Website: theyoungescape.com

The Young Escape (styled "THE YOUNG ESCAPE", "the young escape", or TYE) is a Christian electronic pop band from Southern California, composed of siblings Ryan, McKenna, Kyrsten, and Luke Johns. The band signed to Capitol Christian Music Group in 2017 and released a debut single "Good Life" in October 2017, which attained the No. 1 spot on the Billboard Hot AC/CHR chart in March 2018. Their second single, "Love Me Like You" achieved a top 10 position on the Billboard Hot AC/CHR chart on November 10, 2018 and attained the No. 1 spot on Feb 10, 2019, giving them rare back-to-back debut #1 singles (20 weeks in the top 10).

On January 21, 2020, "So Alive" became their third consecutive single to attain a Top 10 Billboard position. On March 23, 2020 it broke top 5 in its ninth week in the Top 10.

The band supported Crowder on the American Prodigal Tour beginning in the fall of 2017, and was asked back on Crowder's Spring 2018 tour. TYE opened for Jordan Feliz on his Spring 2019 tour, and Citizen Way on their Fall 2019 tour. The band has been on four national tours in their two years of being signed to a major label.

== Discography ==
=== Singles ===
List of singles, with selected chart positions
Title	Year	Peak chart positions	
Title	Year	US Christ	US Christ Air.
"Good Life"	2017	35	26
"Neverfade"	2018	—	—
"Love Me Like You" (featuring nobigdyl.)	2018	—	27
"So Alive"	2019	—	—
"Count on Me"	2021	—	—
"It's Gonna Get Better"	2021	—	—
"Broken is Beautiful"	2022	—	—
"Landslide"	2022	—	—
"Turning My Heart"	2022	—	—
"Worship You There"	2023	—	—
"Won't Lose Sight"	2023	—	—
"Last Christmas"	2023	—	—
"Thank You (feat. MARTY)"	2024	—	—
"Drives"	2024	—	—
"Older"	2025	—	—
