= Every Time I Breathe (song) =

Single by Big Daddy Weave

from the album Every Time I Breathe
- Released: 2007
- Genre: CCM, Christian rock, easy listening
- Length: 3:54
- Label: Fervent Records
- Songwriters: Johnny Redmond; Big Daddy Weave

"Every Time I Breathe" is a song recorded by Big Daddy Weave. It was released as a single from the band's 2006 album of the same title.

== Charts ==
Weekly

Chart (2005)	Peak Position
U.S. Billboard Christian Songs	1

Decade-end

Chart (2000s)	Position
Billboard Hot Christian Songs	38
