= Battle Belongs =

2020 song by Phil Wickham

Single by Phil Wickham

from the album Hymn of Heaven
- Released: September 4, 2020
- Recorded: 2020
- Genre: Contemporary worship music
- Length: 4:47
- Label: Fair Trade Services
- Songwriters: Phil Wickham; Brian Johnson
- Producer: Jonathan Smith

Phil Wickham singles chronology
"This Year for Christmas" (2019)	"Battle Belongs" (2020)	"House of the Lord" (2021)

Music videos
- "Battle Belongs" on YouTube
- "Battle Belongs" (Acoustic) on YouTube
- "Battle Belongs" (Live) on YouTube
- "Battle Belongs" (Lyrics) on YouTube

"Battle Belongs" is a song by American contemporary Christian musician Phil Wickham. The song was released on September 4, 2020, as the lead single to his eighth studio album, Hymn of Heaven (2021). The song impacted Christian radio on October 16, 2020. Wickham co-wrote the song with Brian Johnson, and collaborated with Jonathan Smith in the production of the single.

"Battle Belongs" peaked at No. 2 on the US Hot Christian Songs chart. The song also went on to peak at No. 13 on the Bubbling Under Hot 100 chart. It has been certified gold by Recording Industry Association of America (RIAA). "Battle Belongs" was nominated for the GMA Dove Award Worship Recorded Song of the Year at the 2021 GMA Dove Awards.

== Background ==
On September 4, 2020, Phil Wickham released "Battle Belongs" as a single. Wickham shared the story behind the song, saying:

One of my favorite stories in all of scripture comes from 2 Chronicles 20. It’s a story of this huge army that is amassed to come against the people of God. And when the people of God and their king, Jehoshaphat hear this horde coming their way, they freak out. They literally come to God and say, ‘We are powerless against this army but our eyes are on you, God. Show us what to do.’ And God responds to them. His spirit comes upon this Levite man and through the Levite man, God says, ‘Do not be afraid or dismayed for the battle is not yours, but it is God’s. You will not have to fight in this battle. Stand firm, hold your position, and see the salvation of the Lord on your behalf.’ So much so that instead of sending their army into the front lines, they sent their worshippers into the front lines. The holy men in their robes started singing give thanks to the Lord for His steadfast love endures forever. And you know what happened to the other army as they heard the singing? They freaked out. They were routed. They started turning on each other to the point where the scriptures say not one of them was left alive. God moved on behalf of His people and God is still moving and battling on behalf of His people.

== Composition ==
"Battle Belongs" is composed in the key of D-flat major with a tempo of 162 beats per minute. Wickham's vocal range in this song spans from D♭_{4} to A♭_{5}.

== Reception ==
=== Critical response ===
Jonathan Andre of 365 Days of Inspiring Media gave a positive review of the song, saying "Battle Belongs" is "a great reminder of how we should be acting, especially in 2020 in the midst of a pandemic. Whatever we're facing and the struggle that we're in, we can rest assured that the Lord fights our battles for us- we need only to be still and know He's God, giving our worries and troubles to Him, maybe even on a daily basis."

=== Accolades ===
Awards
Year	Organization	Award	Result	Ref
2021	GMA Dove Awards	Worship Recorded Song of the Year	Nominated	

== Commercial performance ==
"Battle Belongs" debuted at No. 23 on the US Hot Christian Songs chart dated September 19, 2020, concurrently charting at No. 5 on the Christian Digital Song Sales chart. It went on to peak at number 2 on the chart, and spent a total of forty-five non-consecutive weeks on Hot Christian Songs Chart.

The song debuted on the Christian Airplay chart dated October 17, 2020, at No. 43. "Battle Belongs" reached number one on the Christian Airplay chart dated April 10, 2021, becoming Wickham's second chart-topping entry following since "This Is Amazing Grace" in 2014.

== Music videos ==
The official music video for the "Battle Belongs" was availed by Phil Wickham on September 4, 2020, to YouTube. The lyric video of the song was published on Phil Wickham's YouTube channel on September 11, 2020. On September 21, 2020, Phil Wickham released the acoustic performance video of the song on YouTube. On December 21, 2020, Phil Wickham released the live performance video of "Battle Belongs" which was filmed at Harris Creek Baptist Church in Waco, Texas, during the 2020 Christmas Tour, which shows Wickham singing alongside Shane & Shane.

== Track listing ==
"Battle Belongs"
No.	Title	Writer(s)	Length
1.	"Battle Belongs"	Phil Wickham; Brian Johnson	4:47

Audio/Video bundle – Apple Music exclusive
No.	Title	Length
2.	"Battle Belongs" (music video)	4:45
3.	"Battle Belongs" (lyric video)	4:48
Total length:		14:20

== Charts ==
=== Weekly charts ===
Chart performance for "Battle Belongs"
Chart (2020–2021)	Peak position
US Bubbling Under Hot 100 (Billboard)	13
US Hot Christian Songs (Billboard)	2
US Christian Airplay (Billboard)	1
US Christian AC (Billboard)	1

=== Year-end charts ===
Year-end chart performance for "Battle Belongs"
Chart (2021)	Position
US Christian Songs (Billboard)	4
US Christian Airplay (Billboard)	7
US Christian AC (Billboard)	3

== Certifications ==
Region	Certification	Certified units/sales
United States (RIAA)	Platinum	1,000,000^{‡}
^{‡} Sales+streaming figures based on certification alone.

== Release history ==
Release history and formats for "Battle Belongs"
Region	Date	Version	Format	Label	Ref.
Various	September 4, 2020	Single	Digital download; streaming	Fair Trade Services	
Various	September 4, 2020	Audio/Video Bundle (Apple Music exclusive)	Digital download; streaming	Fair Trade Services	
United States	October 16, 2020	Single	Christian radio	Fair Trade Services	

== Other versions ==
- Bethel Music released a duet cover of the song, led by Brian Johnson and Jenn Johnson, on their collective album, Peace, Vol. II (2021).
