= Big Daddy Weave =

American contemporary Christian band

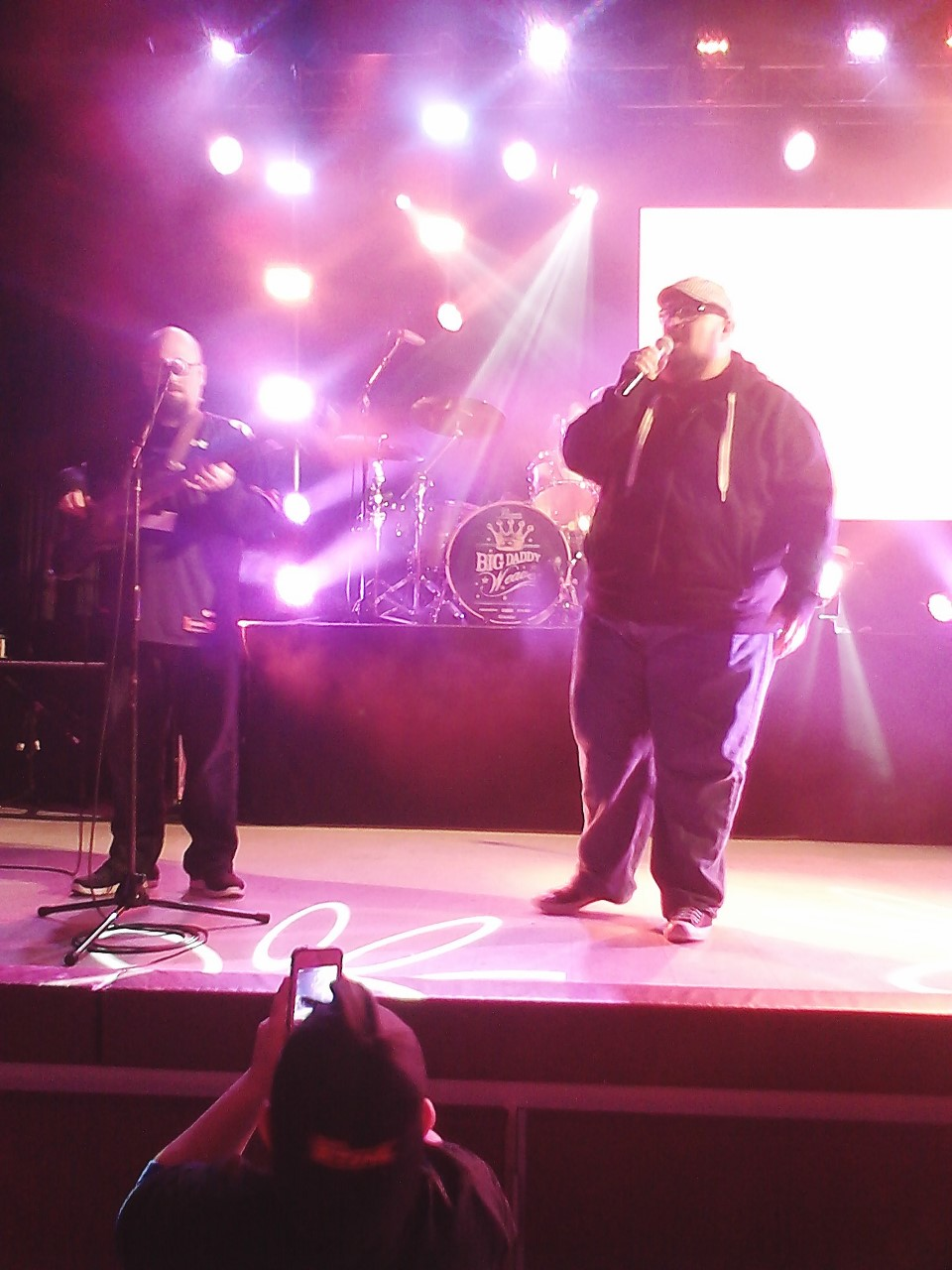
- Big Daddy Weave in concert (2013). Mike Weaver (right), Jay Weaver (left).

Background information
- Origin: Mobile, Alabama, U.S.
- Genres: Rock · CCM
- Years active: 1998–present
- Label: Curb
- Members: Mike Weaver; Joe Shirk; Jeremy Redmon; Brian Beihl; Raul Alfonso
- Past members: Jeff Jones; Jay Weaver
- Website: bigdaddyweave.com

Big Daddy Weave is an American contemporary Christian band from Mobile, Alabama. Formed in 1998, the band is composed of Mike Weaver, Joe Shirk, Jeremy Redmon, Brian Beihl, and Raul Alfonso. Since 2021, they have been signed to Curb Records.

== History ==
The band was formed in 1998 at the University of Mobile in Alabama. Mike Weaver served as worship leader of a Pensacola, Florida church and attended a community college in the area. He came to the university at the urging of his pastor, and studied voice.

In 2006 and 2007, Big Daddy Weave toured with Mark Schultz on his Broken and Beautiful Tour. In 2009, they headlined the What Life Would Be Like Tour with guest musician Josh Wilson.

On June 25, 2019, band frontman Mike Weaver announced that he would be releasing his autobiographical book, I Am Redeemed, on September 3, 2019.

Bassist Jay Weaver died from COVID-19 on January 2, 2022, at the age of 42.

Big Daddy Weave released the single "Let It Begin" on March 15, 2024, off of an upcoming studio album. The band is currently on the spring leg of their Heaven Changes Everything tour, accompanied by Hannah Kerr and Austin French.

Their ninth studio album, Let It Begin, was released on May 23, 2025.

== Band Members ==
=== Current Members ===
- Mike Weaver - lead vocals, guitar (1998–present)
- Joe Shirk - keyboards, saxophones, backing vocals (1998–present)
- Jeremy Redmon - guitar, backing vocals, trumpet (1998–present)
- Brian Beihl - drums (2013–present)
- Raul Alfonso - bass guitar (2023–present)

=== Former Members ===
- Jeff Jones - drums (1998–2013)
- Jay Weaver – bass guitar, vocals (1998–2022; his death)

== Discography ==
=== Studio albums ===
Year	Album	Peak chart positions			Certifications
Year	Album	US	US Christ.	US Ind.	Certifications
2001	Neighborhoods: Released: 2001; Label: Independent	—	—	—	
2002	One and Only: Released: July 30, 2002; Label: Fervent Records	—	16	22	
2003	Fields of Grace: Released: September 30, 2003; Label: Fervent	177	8	—	
2005	What I Was Made For: Released: July 26, 2005; Label: Fervent	— (Note: What I Was Made For did not enter the Billboard 200, but peaked at No. 17 on the Billboard Top Heatseekers)	14	—	
2006	Every Time I Breathe: Released: September 26, 2006; Label: Fervent	— (Note: Every Time I Breathe did not enter the Billboard 200, but peaked at No. 10 on the Billboard Top Heatseekers)	18	—	
2008	What Life Would Be Like: Released: July 22, 2008; Label: Fervent	—	15	—	
2012	Love Come to Life: Released: April 17, 2012; Label: Fervent	68	3	—	RIAA: Gold
2015	Beautiful Offerings: Released: September 18, 2015; Label: Fervent	164	4	—	
2019	When the Light Comes: Released: September 13, 2019; Label: Curb/Word	— (Note: When the Light Comes did not enter the Billboard 200, but peaked at No. 88 on the Billboard Top Album Sales chart.)	14	—	
2025	Let It Begin: Released: May 23, 2025; Label: Curb	—	20	—	
"—" denotes the album didn't chart.

=== Compilation albums ===
Year	Album	Peak chart positions
Year	Album	US Christ.
2011	The Ultimate Collection: Released: September 20, 2011; Label: Fervent	49

=== Christmas albums ===
Year	Album	Peak chart positions
Year	Album	US Holiday
2009	Christ Is Come: Released: October 10, 2009; Label: Fervent	5

=== Singles ===
Year	Single	Peak chart positions					Certifications	Album
Year	Single	US Bub.	US Christ.	Christ. Airplay	US Christ. AC	Christ. Digital Songs	Certifications	Album
2003	"Audience of One"	—	16		19	—		One and Only
2003	"In Christ"	—	28		27	—		One and Only
2003	"Fields of Grace"	—	3		4	—		Fields of Grace
2004	"Set Me Free"	—	35		35	—		Fields of Grace
2004	"Heart Cries Holy"	—	21		18	—		Fields of Grace
2004	"Christ Is Come"	—	9		7	—		Christ Is Come
2005	"You're Worthy of My Praise" (with BarlowGirl)	—	5		5	—		What I Was Made For
2005	"Just the Way I Am"	—	5		6	—		What I Was Made For
2005	"Go Tell It On the Mountain"	—	3		3	—		Christ Is Come
2006	"Without You"	—	25		26	—		What I Was Made For
2006	"Let It Rise"	—	11		4	—		Every Time I Breathe
2007	"Every Time I Breathe"	—	1		1	—		Every Time I Breathe
2008	"Hold Me Jesus"	—	22		16	—		Every Time I Breathe
2008	"What Life Would Be Like"	—	5		3	—		What Life Would Be Like
2009	"You Found Me"	—	7		5	—		What Life Would Be Like
2009	"I'll Be Brave This Christmas"	—	4		4	—		Christ Is Come
2009	"Glory to God in the Highest"	—	25		25	—		Christ Is Come
2010	"We Want the World to Hear"	—	38		23	—		What Life Would Be Like
2012	"Love Come to Life"	—	6		8	—		Love Come to Life
2012	"Redeemed"	25	1		1	2	RIAA: 2× Platinum	Love Come to Life
2013	"The Only Name (Yours Will Be)"	—	2	1	1	4		Love Come to Life
2014	"Overwhelmed"	—	5	3	1	6	RIAA: Gold	Love Come to Life
2015	"My Story"	—	5	1	1	6	RIAA: Gold	Beautiful Offerings
2016	"The Lion and the Lamb"	—	7	2	2	11	RIAA: Gold	Beautiful Offerings
2017	"Jesus I Believe"	—	13	5	7	—		Beautiful Offerings (Deluxe Edition)
2019	"Alive"	—	7	1	1	17		When the Light Comes
2019	"Joy! He Shall Reign"	—	36	17	17	—		non-album single
2020	"I Know" (Note: "I Know" was released as a promotional single in 2019, prior to When the Light Comes' release. It was not released as a radio single until 2020.)	—	5	1	2	13		When the Light Comes
2020	"This Is What We Live For" (Note: "This Is What We Live For" was released as a promotional single in 2019, prior to When the Light Comes' release. It was not released as a radio single until 2020.)	—	22	15	12	—		When the Light Comes
2021	"All Things New"	—	18	9	6	—		When the Light Comes
2022	"God Is in This Story" (with Katy Nichole)	—	1	1	5	4	RIAA: Gold	Jesus Changed My Life Let It Begin
2023	"Heaven Changes Everything"	—	2	2	2	2		Let It Begin
2024	"Let It Begin" (original or with Megan Woods and Ben Fuller)	—	15	5	7	—		Let It Begin
2025	"I've Just Seen Too Much"	—	45	20	20	—		Let It Begin
2025	"Stranger No More" (with Zach Williams)	—	—	—	—	—		Let It Begin

=== Promotional singles ===
Year	Single	Peak chart positions		Certifications	Album
Year	Single	US Bub.	US Christ.	Certifications	Album
2019	"When the Light Comes"	—	—		non-album single

=== Music videos ===
- "Every Time I Breathe" (July 26, 2006)
- "What Life Would be Like" (September 9, 2008)
- "Redeemed" (May 3, 2012)
- "Overwhelmed" (August 7, 2014)
- "My Story" (August 31, 2015)
- "Jesus I Believe" (April 12, 2016)
- "Alive" (February 8, 2019)

=== Album contributions ===
- WOW Worship Yellow - "Audience of One" (2003)
- Absolute Smash Hits - "In Christ" (2004)
- WOW Worship Red - "Word of God Speak" (2004)
- WOW Hits 2006 - "You're Worthy of My Praise" (2005)
- WOW Christmas: Green - "Go Tell It on the Mountain" (2005)
- WOW Hits 2007 - "Without You" (2006)
- WOW Worship Aqua - "Let It Rise" (2006)
- WOW Hits 2008 - "Every Time I Breathe" (2007)
- The Nativity Story: Sacred Songs - "The Virgin's Lullaby" (2007)
- WOW Hits 2010 - "What Life Would Be Like" (2009)
- WOW Hits 2011 - "You Found Me" (2010)
- WOW Hits 2013 - "Love Come to Life" (2012)
- WOW Hits 2014 - "Redeemed" (2013)
- WOW Hits 2015 - "The Only Name" (2014)
- WOW Hits 2016 - "Overwhelmed" (2015)
- WOW Hits 2017 - "My Story" (2016)
- WOW Hits 2018 - "The Lion and the Lamb" (2017)
- WOW Hits 2019 - "Jesus I Believe" (2018)

== Awards and nominations ==
Year	Organization	Nominee / work	Category	Result	Ref.
2025	We Love Awards	"Let It Begin" (featuring Ben Fuller and Megan Woods)	Collaboration of the Year	Nominated	
