= Tasha Layton =

American singer (born 1982)

- Born: October 27, 1982 (age 43)
- Origin: Pauline, South Carolina, United States
- Genres: Contemporary Christian music
- Occupations: Singer, songwriter, author
- Instrument: Vocals
- Years active: 2010–present
- Label: BEC
- Website: tashalayton.com

Tasha Layton (born October 27, 1982) is an American contemporary Christian music singer, songwriter, and author.

Layton had her first CCM radio hit in 2019 with her debut radio single "Love Lifting Me". However, her second radio single, "Into the Sea (It's Gonna Be OK)" released in 2020, has been labelled her breakthrough song, and has seen her elevated into the Billboard Top 5 Female Christian Artists in 2020.

In 2021, her single "Look What You've Done" became her first top ten single on the Billboard Hot Christian Songs chart and her first number one Christian Airplay single. A Good Morning America segment introduced her as "one of the fastest rising stars in Christian music".

In 2022, her debut album "How Far" was released in May. The title track has become her first top five single on the Billboard Hot Christian Songs chart and her second number one Christian Airplay single.

== Early life and education ==
Layton is originally from Pauline, South Carolina. She grew up Southern Baptist and converted to Assemblies of God when she was young. While she was a teenager, her church had undergone a split and she had struggles with her faith. She changed her college major from music to religion and tried out multiple religions. She eventually returned to Christianity after attending a small church about an hour away. After graduation from college, she moved to California and enrolled at The King's Seminary in Van Nuys, Los Angeles, California where she got her Master of Divinity degree. During that time, Layton worked as a worship leader for four years and began working as a session vocalist in the city.

== Career ==
In 2010, she auditioned for season 9 of American Idol, reaching the third round of its Hollywood week and was sent home. Shortly after, she auditioned for and landed a background singer position for Katy Perry, and spent the next four years doing session recordings and tours. She also worked on songs used at Disneyland, Cirque du Soleil, and Nickelodeon. Afterwards, she moved to Nashville, Tennessee to pursue a solo music career, and in 2013 became an instructor at Trevecca Nazarene University.

Layton signed to BEC Recordings, and on September 5, 2018, released her first single and lyric video, "I Belong to You". In October, she released the single "Love Lifting Me". "Love Lifting Me" reached the top 25 on both the Billboard Christian Airplay and Christian AC Airplay charts.

In July 2019, she released her debut EP entitled Love Running Wild. In April 2020, Layton released her second radio single, "Into The Sea". It reached number 12 on the Billboard Hot Christian Songs chart.

In April 2021, she released the single "Look What You've Done", and on June 11, an EP of the same name. In December, the song reached number one on the Billboard Christian Airplay chart.

== Personal life ==
Layton is married to musician and producer Keith Everette Smith. They have two children.

== Discography ==
=== Studio albums ===
Title	Details
How Far	Release date: May 13, 2022; Label: BEC Recordings; Formats: CD, download, streaming
This is Christmas	Release date: November 11, 2022; Label: BEC Recordings; Formats: CD, download, streaming
Life In Me	Scheduled: October 10, 2025; Label: BEC Recordings; Formats: CD, download, streaming

=== Live albums ===
Title	Details
Worship Through It - Live	Release date: March 7, 2025; Label: BEC Recordings; Formats: download, streaming

=== Extended plays ===
Title	EP details
Love Running Wild	Released: June 28, 2019; Label: BEC Recordings; Format: Digital download
Into the Sea	Released: September 18, 2020; Label: BEC Recordings; Format: Digital download
Look What You've Done	Released: June 11, 2021; Label: BEC Recordings; Format: Digital download
This is Christmas	Released: November 3, 2021; Label: BEC Recordings; Format: Digital download
Singing In the Dark	Released: June 27, 2025; Label: BEC Recordings; Format: Digital download

=== Singles released to radio ===
Title	Year	Peak position			Album
Title	Year	US Christ.	US Christ. Airplay	US Christ. AC	Album
"Love Lifting Me"	2018	28	23	21	Love Running Wild
"Into the Sea (It's Gonna Be OK)"	2020	12	9	9	How Far
"Comfort and Joy"	2020	—	36	16	This is Christmas
"Look What You've Done"	2021	7	1	2	How Far
"How Far"	2022	4	1	2	How Far
"God Made a Way" with Brandon Heath	2022	25	6	2	Non-album single
"Never"	2023	15	1	5	Life In Me
"Worship Through It" (with Chris Brown)	2024	12	1	1	Life In Me
"Thank You Isn't Enough" (with The Choir Room)	2025	—	22	21	Life In Me
"Life In Me"	2025	—	—	—	Life In Me

=== As featured artist ===
Title	Year
"Things That I'm Afraid Of" (Josh Wilson featuring Tasha Layton)	2022

=== Other charted songs ===
Title	Year	Peak position			Album
Title	Year	US Christ.	US Christ. Airplay	US Christ. AC	Album
"This is Christmas"	2021	—	22	16	This is Christmas
"Giving Christmas Away"	2021	—	50	—	This is Christmas
"Diddly Squat"	2025	43	—	—	This is Christmas
"White Christmas"	2025	49	38	—	This is Christmas
"Christmas All Year Long"	2025	—	5	12	This is Christmas
"Meet Me in the Valley"	2026	21	11	13	Life in Me
