= Katy Nichole =

American contemporary Christian musician

- Born: Katelyn Nichole Litwiller; July 29, 2000 (age 26); Tremont, Illinois, US
- Genres: CCM; contemporary worship
- Occupations: Singer; songwriter; worship leader
- Instruments: Vocals; guitar; piano
- Years active: 2022–present
- Label: Centricity Music
- Website: Official website

Katelyn Nichole Litwiller (born July 29, 2000), is an American singer and songwriter. Nichole made her debut in 2022, with the release of the single "In Jesus Name (God of Possible)" through Centricity Music. "In Jesus Name (God of Possible)" was Nichole's breakthrough hit and it reached No. 1 on Billboard's Hot Christian Songs chart and the Bubbling Under Hot 100 chart. Her next single, "God Is in This Story" with Big Daddy Weave, also reached number one on the Hot Christian Songs chart. Her debut self-titled extended play, containing "In Jesus Name (God of Possible)" and "God Is In This Story" debuted at No. 7 on the Top Christian Albums chart in the United States.

== Career ==
On January 26, 2022, Nichole released "In Jesus Name (God of Possible)" as her debut single. "In Jesus Name (God of Possible)" became her breakthrough hit single, peaking at number one on the Hot Christian Songs chart and the Christian Airplay chart. "In Jesus Name (God of Possible)" received a GMA Dove Award nomination for Pop/Contemporary Recorded Song of the Year at the 2022 GMA Dove Awards. On June 10, 2022, Nichole and Big Daddy Weave released the single "God Is in This Story". The song peaked at number one on the Hot Christian Songs chart. She released her debut extended play, Katy Nichole, on June 24, 2022. The EP debuted at number seven on the Top Christian Albums chart in the U.S. On October 21, 2022, she released "O What a King" released as a single. "O What a King" peaked at number 14 on the Hot Christian Songs chart.

== Personal life ==
=== Beliefs ===
In 2020, she became a Christian and was baptized.

== Discography ==
=== Studio albums ===
| Title | Album details | Peak chart positions | |
| Title | Album details | US | US Christ. |
|---|---|---|---|
| Jesus Changed My Life | Released: February 24, 2023; Label: Centricity Music; Format: Digital download, streaming | — (Note: Jesus Changed My Life did not enter the Billboard 200, but peaked at No. 48 on the Billboard Top Current Album Sales chart.) | 3 |
| Honest Conversations | Released: August 15, 2025; Label: Centricity; Format: Digital download, streaming | — | 22 |
"—" denotes a recording that did not chart

=== Extended plays ===
| Title | Album details | Peak chart positions | |
| Title | Album details | US | US Christ. |
|---|---|---|---|
| Katy Nichole | Released: June 24, 2022; Label: Centricity; Format: CD, digital download, streaming | — | 7 |
| Learning How To Love Myself | Released: July 11, 2025; Label: Centricity; Format: Digital download, streaming | — | — |
"—" denotes a recording that did not chart

=== Singles ===
| Title | Year | Chart positions | | | | | | Certifications (sales threshold) | Album |
| Title | Year | US | US Christ | US Christ Air. | US Christ AC | US Christ Digital | US Christ Stream. | Certifications (sales threshold) | Album |
|---|---|---|---|---|---|---|---|---|---|
| "In Jesus Name (God of Possible)" | 2022 | — (Note: "In Jesus Name (God of Possible)" did not enter the Billboard Hot 100, but peaked at No. 1 on the Billboard Bubbling Under Hot 100 and No. 6 on the Billboard Digital Song Sales chart.) | 1 | 1 | 1 | 1 | 2 | RIAA: Platinum | Jesus Changed My Life |
| "God Is in This Story" (with Big Daddy Weave) | 2022 | — | 1 | 1 | 2 | 4 | 11 | RIAA: Gold | Jesus Changed My Life Let It Begin |
| "God Is Love" (with Centricity Worship) | 2022 | — | — | — | — | — | — | | Centricity Worship & Friends (EP) |
| "O What a King" | 2022 | — | — | — | — | — | — | | Non-album single |
| "Hold On" | 2023 | — | 7 | 2 | 2 | 9 | — | | Jesus Changed My Life |
| "Good Lord" (with David Leonard) | 2023 | — | — | — | — | — | — | | Non-album single |
| "Oh My Soul" (with Casting Crowns and David Leonard) | 2023 | — | — | — | — | — | — | | Lifesong: A Celebration of the First 20 Years |
| "My God Can" (with Naomi Raine) | 2023 | — | 5 | 2 | 3 | 5 | 19 | | Jesus Changed My Life (deluxe edition) |
| "When I Fall" | 2024 | — | 15 | 6 | 5 | 6 | — | | Honest Conversations |
| "I Found Jesus" | 2026 | — | — | 27 | 23 | — | — | | Honest Conversations |
"—" denotes a recording that did not chart

=== Promotional singles ===
| Title | Year | Chart positions | | | Certifications (sales threshold) | Album |
| Title | Year | US Christ | US Christ Air | US Christ AC | Certifications (sales threshold) | Album |
|---|---|---|---|---|---|---|
| "Please" | 2023 | 18 | — | — | | Jesus Changed My Life |
| "Honest Conversation" | 2025 | — | — | — | | Honest Conversations |
| "Thorns" | 2025 | — | — | — | | Honest Conversations |
| "Have Your Way" | 2025 | 14 | 2 | 1 | | Honest Conversations |
"—" denotes a recording that did not chart

=== Other charted songs ===
| Title | Year | Chart positions | | | Album |
| Title | Year | US Christ | US Christ Air. | US Christ AC | Album |
|---|---|---|---|---|---|
| "O What a King" | 2022 | 14 | 21 | 6 | Oh What a King |
| "Our King Has Come" (with Matt Maher) | 2025 | 32 | 7 | 3 | The Hope of Christmas EP |
| "O Come, O Come Emmanuel" | 2025 | — | 33 | — | The Hope of Christmas EP |
"—" denotes a recording that did not chart

== Tours ==
Headlining

- In Jesus Name Tour (2025)
- Honest Conversations Tour (2026)

Supporting

- I Still Believe Tour with Jeremy Camp (2022)
- An Evening at the Story House Matthew West (2022)
- K-LOVE Christmas Tour (2022)
- Live & In Color Tour (2023) with Cain
- Winter Jam Tour Spectacular (2024) with Crowder, Lecrae, Cain, Seventh Day Slumber, NewSong and Joseph O'Brien (singer)
- Winter Jam Tour Spectacular (2026) with Matthew West, Chris Tomlin, Disciple, NewSong and Hulvey

== Awards and nominations ==
=== American Music Awards ===
| Year | Nominee / work | Award | Result | Ref. |
|---|---|---|---|---|
| 2022 | Katy Nichole | Favorite Inspirational Artist | Nominated | |

=== GMA Dove Awards ===
| Year | Nominee / work | Award | Result | Ref. |
|---|---|---|---|---|
| 2022 | "In Jesus Name (God of Possible)" | Pop/Contemporary Recorded Song of the Year | Nominated | |
| 2023 | "In Jesus Name (God of Possible)" | Song of the Year | Nominated | |
| 2023 | Katy Nichole | New Artist of the Year | Won | |
| 2023 | "God Is in This Story" (with Big Daddy Weave) | Pop/Contemporary Recorded Song of the Year | Nominated | |
| 2023 | Jesus Changed My Life | Pop/Contemporary Album of the Year | Nominated | |
| 2026 | "Our King Has Come" | Christmas Recorded Song of the Year | Pending | |
| 2026 | Honest Conversations | Recorded Music Packaging of the Year | Pending | |

=== We Love Awards ===
| Year | Nominee / work | Award | Result | Ref. |
|---|---|---|---|---|
| 2025 | "When I Fall" | Music Video of the Year | Nominated | |

== See also ==
- List of Christian worship music artists
