= Austin French =

American contemporary Christian musician

- Born: Austin Bryan French; February 13, 1994 (age 32); Cordele, Georgia, U.S.
- Origin: Nashville, Tennessee
- Genres: Worship · CCM
- Occupation: Singer · songwriter
- Instrument: Vocals · guitar
- Years active: 2014–present
- Label: Fair Trade Services · Awaken
- Website: austinfrenchmusic.com

Austin Bryan French (born February 13, 1994) is an American Christian musician, who plays Christian pop style contemporary worship music. He released his debut single, "Freedom Hymn", through Fair Trade Services on December 8, 2017. The song went on to receive radio play and ultimately peaked at No. 8 on the Billboard Hot Christian Songs chart.

== Early and personal life ==
French grew up in the small town of Cordele, Georgia. When he was young, he wished to be a contemporary Christian artist who wrote songs that "shared his faith and passion for Jesus." He formed bands learning to take his music to stages, churches, and anyone who would listen. He toured while in high school. "We would fill up the church van or my best friend's Suburban and drive, praying that we would make it to the gigs without breaking down, just to play for 10 people and then do it again every weekend we could," says French. He saw a passion and calling from God to share music which was "rooted in the gospel." He started leading music at Journey Church, in Tifton at the age of 18 and became the full-time worship pastor. He met his wife, Joscelyn French, at the church. He led musicians and the congregation in worship for three years.

== Music career ==
In 2014, French was featured on the first season of the ABC TV show "Rising Star". He performed songs such as "Bless the Broken Road" and "If I Ain't Got You". He impressed millions of viewers working with guest judges Ludacris, Kesha, and Brad Paisley and making it to the finale. He finished as the runner-up on the show and had the opportunity to share the stage with multi-platinum recording artist, Josh Groban.

After Rising Star, French began working in the CCM industry. He found his manager and CEO of One One 7, Jason Davis, a manager/partner with First Company Management. Through many writing trips to Nashville, French expanded his ministry and developed as a performer. His passion for ministry led him to move with his family to Delray Beach, serving as the worship pastor at The Avenue Church. While there, French continued to write and travel to Nashville, writing songs and making friendships which were vital in the industry. He signed a record deal with Fair Trade Services, a record label home for artists including the Newsboys, MercyMe, Phil Wickham, Laura Story, Hawk Nelson, and several other successful Christian artists.

French released his debut single "Freedom Hymn" on December 8, 2017. A lyric video was released on September 19, 2017. The single peaked at No. 8 on the Billboard Hot Christian Songs Top 10. According to Billboard, the song increased by seven percent to 6.8 million impressions reaching No. 7 on the Christian Airplay chart. His debut album Wide Open was released on September 7, 2018 and features 12 songs including "Freedom Hymn", "Wide Open", "Why God", "Born Again", and "Good Feeling," all singles. The album charted on the Billboard Top Christian Albums and Heatseekers Albums charts, at Nos. 30 and 9 respectively. "Good Feeling" was featured in the teaser trailer for the 2025 Pixar film Elio.

In 2024, French accompanied Christian band Big Daddy Weave for the spring leg of the band's ongoing Heaven Changes Everything tour.

== Discography ==
=== Albums ===
List of studio albums, with selected chart positions
Title	Album details	Peak chart positions	
Title	Album details	US Christ.	US Heat
Wide Open	Released: September 7, 2018; Label: Fair Trade Services/Awaken Records; Formats: CD, digital download	30	9

=== Extended plays ===
List of extended plays, with selected chart positions
Title	EP details	Peak chart positions	
Title	EP details	US Christ.	US Heat
Wake Up Sleeper	Released: September 18, 2020; Label: Fair Trade Services/Awaken Records; Formats: Digital download	—	—
Broken Home	Released: August 9, 2024; Label: Fair Trade Services/Awaken Records; Formats: Digital download	—	—

=== Singles ===
Year	Single	Chart positions		Album
Year	Single	US Christ	US Christ Air.	Album
2017	"Freedom Hymn"	8	7	Wide Open
2018	"I Need a Hallelujah"	—	—	Wide Open
2018	"Born Again"	17	14	Wide Open
2019	"Why God"	27	23	Wide Open
2020	"Wake Up Sleeper"	20	14	Wake Up Sleeper (EP)
2020	"Rest for Your Soul"	—	—	Wake Up Sleeper (EP)
2020	"Perfect Love"	—	—	Wake Up Sleeper (EP)
2020	"Peace on Earth"	—	—	Non-album single

=== Promotional singles ===
Year	Single	Chart positions	Album
Year	Single	US Christ	Album
2018	"Wide Open" (featuring Matthew West)	—	Wide Open
2018	"(I've Got That) Good Feeling" (feat. Marina The Mermaid of The Westside Girls)	—	Wide Open

=== Other charted songs ===
Year	Single	Chart positions	Album
Year	Single	US Christ Digital	Album
2019	"Born Again" (featuring Zauntee)	18	Non-album single

=== Other appearances ===
Year	Song	Album
2019	"Enough" (Social Club Misfits featuring Austin French)	DOOM. EP
2020	"My God Fights For Me" (Micah Tyler featuring Austin French & Nickie Conley)	New Today

=== Competition singles ===
Year	Single
2014	"I Don't Want to Be"
2014	"Georgia on My Mind"
2014	"If I Ain't Got You"
2014	"The House of the Rising Sun"
2014	"Love Runs Out"
2014	"Bless the Broken Road"
2014	"In Love with a Girl"

== Awards ==
=== GMA Dove Awards ===
Year	Nominee / work	Award	Result
2019	Austin French	New Artist of the Year	Nominated
