= Phil Wickham discography =

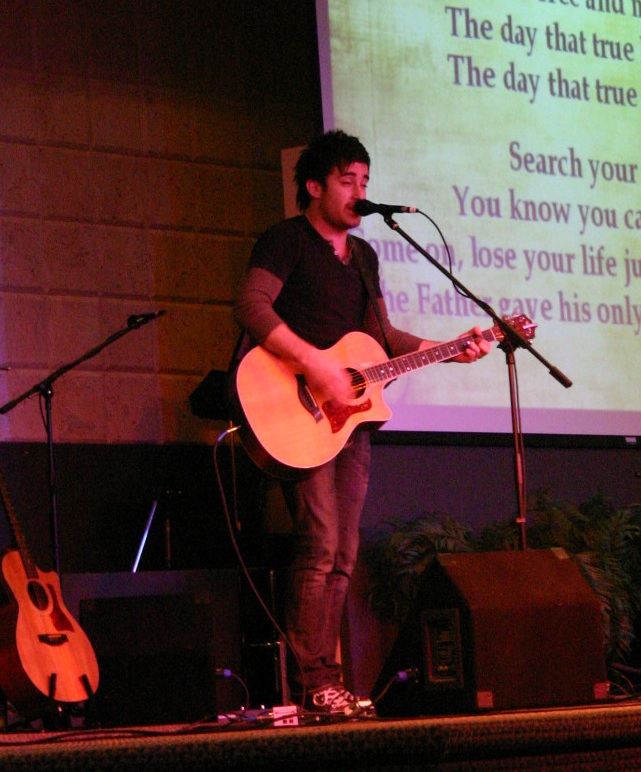
- Wickham in concert in Pinellas Park, Florida, January 2008
- Studio albums: 11
- Live albums: 4
- Singles: 43
- Other album appearances: 9

Christian contemporary and worship musician Phil Wickham has released eleven studio albums, four live albums, 43 singles, and nine other appearances.

== Albums ==
=== Studio albums ===
List of studio albums, with selected chart positions and certifications
Title	Album details	Peak chart positions			
Title	Album details	US	US Christ.	UK C&G	UK Down.
Give You My World	Released: September 22, 2003; Label: Independent; Format: CD	—	—	—	—
Phil Wickham	Released: April 25, 2006; Label: INO Records; Format: CD, digital download	149	8	—	—
Cannons	Released: October 2, 2007; Label: INO; Format: CD, digital download	—	16	—	—
Heaven & Earth	Released: November 17, 2009; Label: INO; Format: CD, digital download	55	4	—	—
Response	Released: October 4, 2011; Label: Fair Trade; Format: CD, digital download	43	3	—	—
The Ascension	Released: September 24, 2013; Label: Fair Trade; Format: CD, digital download	39	2	2	—
Children of God	Released: April 22, 2016; Label: Fair Trade; Format: CD, digital download	72	3	2	—
Living Hope	Released: August 3, 2018; Label: Fair Trade; Format: CD, digital download	108	1	2	—
Hymn of Heaven	Released: June 25, 2021; Label: Fair Trade; Format: CD, digital download	— (Note: Hymn of Heaven did not enter the Billboard 200, but peaked at No. 51 on the Top Album Sales Chart.)	1	6	89
I Believe	Released: August 4, 2023; Label: Fair Trade; Format: CD, digital download	— (Note: I Believe did not enter the Billboard 200, but peaked at No. 44 on the Billboard Top Album Sales.)	1	7	28
Song of the Saints	Released: September 12, 2025; Label: Fair Trade; Format: CD, digital download	42	2	2	19
"—" denotes that a release did not chart.

=== Live albums ===
List of live albums
Title	Album details	Peak chart positions		
Title	Album details	US	US Christ.	UK C&G
Singalong	Released: August 8, 2008; Label: INO; Format: Free digital download	—	—	—
Singalong 2	Released: October 30, 2012; Label: INO; Format: Digital download	—	—	—
Singalong 3	Released: May 12, 2015; Label: Fair Trade; Format: Digital download	104	1	2
Singalong 4	Released: May 3, 2019; Label: Fair Trade	—	29	10

=== Christmas albums ===
List of Christmas albums, with selected chart positions
Title	Album details	Peak chart positions		
Title	Album details	US Christ.	US Holiday	UK C&G
Songs for Christmas	Released: October 28, 2010; Label: INO; Format: CD, digital download	24	15	—
Christmas	Released: October 4, 2019; Label: Independent	33	16	—
Hallelujah! It's Christmas!	Released: November 1, 2024; Label: Independent	6	29	7
Hallelujah! It's Christmas Again!	Releasing: November 20, 2026; Label: Independent	—	—	—

=== Other albums ===
List of other albums, with selected chart positions
Title	Album details	Peak chart positions
Title	Album details	US Christ.
Children of God: Acoustic Sessions	Released: October 14, 2016; Label: Fair Trade	32
Living Hope: The House Sessions	Released: January 18, 2019; Label: Fair Trade	— (Note: Living Hope: The House Sessions did not enter the Billboard Top Christian Albums chart, but peaked at No. 38 on the Billboard Christian Album Sales chart.)

== Extended plays ==
List of extended plays, with selected chart positions and certifications
Title	Details
Psalm 8 (Hallé)	Released: November 28, 2025; Label: Fair Trade; Formats: Digital download, streaming

== Singles ==
=== As lead artist ===
List of singles, with selected chart positions
Year	Title	Peak chart positions							Certifications	Album
Year	Title	US	US AC	US Christ.	US Christ. Air.	US Christ. AC	US Christ. Digital	UK Down.	Certifications	Album
2006	"Grace"	—	—	35		34	—	—		Phil Wickham
2006	"Divine Romance"	—	—	—		—	—	—		Phil Wickham
2006	"I Will Wait for You There"	—	—	—		—	—	—		Phil Wickham
2006	"Mystery"	—	—	—		—	—	—		Phil Wickham
2007	"True Love"	—	—	—		—	—	—		Cannons
2007	"Home"	—	—	—		—	—	—		Cannons
2007	"After Your Heart"	—	—	24		—	—	—		Cannons
2009	"Heaven & Earth"	—	—	—		—	—	—		Heaven & Earth
2009	"Safe" (with Bart Millard)	—	—	4		4	31	—		Heaven & Earth
2009	"Cielo"	—	—	—		—	—	—		Heaven & Earth
2010	"In My Love"	—	—	35		—	—	—		Heaven & Earth (Expanded Edition)
2010	"Christmas Time"	—	—	22		22	—	—		Songs for Christmas
2010	"The First Noel"	—	—	29		29	—	—		Songs for Christmas
2011	"O Holy Night"	—	—	—		24	—	—		Songs for Christmas
2012	"At Your Name (Yahweh, Yahweh)"	—	—	18		24	34	—		Response
2012	"This Is the Day"	—	—	31		30	—	—		Response
2013	"This Is Amazing Grace"	— (Note: "This Is Amazing Grace" did not enter the Billboard Hot 100, but peaked at No. 24 on the Billboard Bubbling Under Hot 100 chart.)	—	2	1	1	3	—	RIAA: Platinum	The Ascension
2014	"Glory"	—	—	22	17	18	—	—		The Ascension
2016	"Your Love Awakens Me"	—	—	14	11	12	41	—		Children of God
2017	"My All in All"	—	—	32	23	24	—	—		Children of God
2018	"Living Hope"	—	—	10	9	11	11	—	RIAA: Platinum	Living Hope
2018	"Till I Found You"	—	—	9	9	9	9	—	RIAA: Gold	Living Hope
2018	"Great Things"	—	—	11	7	7	—	—		Living Hope
2019	"You Cannot Be Stopped" (with Chris Quilala)	—	—	35	—	—	20	—		Non-album single (Note: "You Cannot Be Stopped" was released as a standalone single. Wickham released the live version of the song solely performed by himself on Singalong 4.)
2019	"Joy to the World (Joyful, Joyful)"	—	—	19	11	4	—	—		Christmas
2019	"Hark the Herald Angels Sing"	—	—	43	32	—	—	—		Christmas
2019	"This Year for Christmas"	—	—	37	—	—	—	—		Christmas
2020	"Battle Belongs"	— (Note: "Battle Belongs" did not enter the Billboard Hot 100, but peaked at No. 13 on the Billboard Bubbling Under Hot 100 chart.)	—	2	1	1	3	—	RIAA: Platinum	Hymn of Heaven
2021	"House of the Lord"	— (Note: "House of the Lord" did not enter the Billboard Hot 100, but peaked at No. 12 on the Billboard Bubbling Under Hot 100 chart.)	—	1	1	1	4	—	RIAA: Gold	Hymn of Heaven
2022	"Hymn of Heaven"	—	—	2	4	1	5	—	RIAA: Gold	Hymn of Heaven
2022	"Worthy of My Song (Worthy of It All)" (with Maverick City Music and Chandler Moore featuring Mav City Gospel Choir)	—	—	27	—	—	6	—		Non-album singles
2022	"Behold" (featuring Anne Wilson)	—	—	8	2	1	15	—		Non-album singles
2023	"This Is Our God"	—	—	2	1	1	1	—	RIAA: Gold	I Believe
2023	"Sunday Is Coming"	—	—	5	39	—	1	—		I Believe
2023	"The Jesus Way"	—	—	26	29	21	2	—		I Believe
2023	"People of Heaven" (with Brandon Lake)	—	—	40	—	—	8	—		Non-album single
2023	"I Believe"	—	—	6	2	2	3	—		I Believe
2024	"Angels (Glory to God)"	—	—	4	1	1	—	—		Hallelujah! It's Christmas!
2024	"Shepherd Boy"	—	—	35	—	—	—	—		Hallelujah! It's Christmas!
2025	"The King Is in the Room"	—	—	15	6	5	4	—		Song of the Saints
2025	"What an Awesome God" (Rich Mullins cover)	86	—	2	1	1	1	80		Song of the Saints
2025	"Homesick for Heaven"	— (Note: "Homesick for Heaven" did not enter the Billboard Hot 100, but peaked at No. 12 on the Billboard Digital Song Sales chart.)	—	7	1	1	3	—		Song of the Saints
2025	"So So Good" (solo or with Brandon Lake and Elevation Worship)	—	—	8	31	—	4	—		Song of the Saints
2025	"Fear Has No Power"	—	—	42	—	—	—	—		Song of the Saints (Deluxe)
2026	"It Really Is Amazing Grace" (with Crowder)	— (Note: "It Really Is Amazing Grace" did not enter the Billboard Hot 100, but peaked at No. 9 on the Billboard Digital Song Sales chart.)	29	7	1	1	1	—		Song of the Saints (Deluxe)
2026	"Everyday Hallelujah"	— (Note: "Everyday Hallelujah" did not enter the Billboard Hot 100, but peaked at No. 16 on the Billboard Digital Song Sales chart.)	—	20	20	30	—	—		Everyday Hallelujah (EP)
"—" denotes that a release did not chart.

=== As featured artist ===
List of singles, with selected chart positions
Year	Title	Peak chart positions		Album
Year	Title	US Christ	US Christ Digital	Album
2022	"Then Christ Came" (MercyMe featuring Phil Wickham)	—	—	Non-album single
2026	"He Arose" (with Tommee Profitt)	24	4	The Resurrection of a King

== Promotional singles ==
List of promotional singles, with selected chart positions
Year	Title	Peak chart positions		Album
Year	Title	US Christ.	US Christ. Digital	Album
2018	"Song in My Soul" (featuring Hollyn)	44	—	Living Hope
2018	"How Great Is Your Love"	—	—	Living Hope
2021	"It's Always Been You"	27	4	Hymn of Heaven
2022	"Reason I Sing"	48	—	Hymn of Heaven (Acoustic Sessions)
2025	"Song of the Saints"	30	12	Song of the Saints
2026	"God Is Good" (featuring CAIN)	48	10	Song of the Saints (Deluxe)
"—" denotes that a release did not chart.

== Other charted songs ==
List of charted songs, with selected chart positions
Year	Title	Peak chart positions			Album
Year	Title	US Christ.	US Christ. Air.	US Christ. Digital	Album
2022	"Where I'm Standing Now" (featuring Brandon Lake)	—	41	—	Hymn of Heaven
2025	"Able"	36	—	—	Song of the Saints
2025	"Running to a Runaway"	45	—	—	Song of the Saints
2025	"O Christmas Tree (Greatest Story)"	—	32	—	Hallelujah! It's Christmas!
2025	"Psalm 8"	28	—	9	DAVID (Soundtrack from the Angel Original Film)
2025	"Follow the Light" (with Brandon Engman)	29	—	—	DAVID (Soundtrack from the Angel Original Film)
2026	"Why God - My God" (with Miri Mesika)	43	—	—	DAVID (Soundtrack from the Angel Original Film)
2026	"How Great" (Tauren Wells featuring Phil Wickham and Hulvey)	31	—	—	Breathe on It
2026	"SOS (Don't Let Me Go)"	23	—	—	The Chosen - Inspired By (Seasons 1-5)
"—" denotes that a release did not chart.

== Other album appearances ==
This is a list of other album appearances by Phil Wickham on various albums.

List of compilation albums appearances
Other Compilations
Title	Album details
The Message: Psalms	Song Title: "Eyes for You (Psalm 141)" (with Sarah MacIntosh); Year Released: 2005; Label: (eb+flo); Formats: CD, digital download
Joy to the World: The Ultimate Christmas Collection	Song Title: "Messiah"; Year Released: 2006; Label: (INO); Formats: CD, digital download
The CCM New Music Collection: Vol. 2	Song Title: "Cannons"; Year Released: 2007; Label: (Salem Publishing); Formats: CD, digital download
Acoustic Showcase Sampler GMA Music Week 2008	Song Title: "True Love"; Year Released: 2008; Label: (INO); Formats: CD, digital download
Your Name	Song Title: "Your Name" (with Paul Baloche); Year Released: 2008; Label: (Integrity); Formats: CD, digital download
SongDISCovery Vol. 82	Song Title: "Because of Your Love"; Year Released: 2009; Label: (Worship Leader); Formats: CD, digital download
Catalyst Music Project	Song Title: "One Who Overcomes"; Year Released: 2010; Label: (INO Records); Formats: CD, digital download
Freedom: Artists United For International Justice Mission	Song Title: "Safe (Acoustic)"; Year Released: 2010; Label: (FCS); Formats: CD, digital download
SongDISCovery Christmas 2011	Song Title: "Christmas Time"; Year Released: 2011; Label: (Worship Leader); Formats: CD, digital download
