= Song of the Saints =

Studio album by Phil Wickham
- Released: September 12, 2025
- Length: 63:58
- Labels: Fair Trade Services; Columbia
- Producers: Jonathan Smith; Shane Becker; Micah Nichols

Phil Wickham chronology
I Believe (2023)	Song of the Saints (2025)

Singles from Song of the Saints
- 1. "The King Is in the Room" Released: February 21, 2025; 2. "What an Awesome God" Released: April 11, 2025; 3. "Homesick for Heaven" Released: May 30, 2025; 4. "So So Good" Released: August 15, 2025

Singles from Song of the Saints (Deluxe)
- 1. "Fear Has No Power" Released: October 24, 2025; 2. "It Really Is Amazing Grace" Released: January 16, 2026

Song of the Saints is the eleventh studio album by American contemporary Christian singer Phil Wickham, released on September 12, 2025, through Fair Trade Services and Columbia Records. The album features a guest appearance from evangelist Billy Graham. It was produced by Jonathan Smith, Shane Becker, and Micah Nichols.

The album has been supported by the release of four singles, "The King Is in the Room", "What an Awesome God", "Homesick for Heaven" and "So So Good". "The King Is in the Room" peaked at No. 15 on the Billboard Hot Christian Songs chart. "What an Awesome God" peaked at No. 3 on the Hot Christian Songs chart and No. 96 on the Hot 100 chart. "Homesick for Heaven" peaked at No. 14 on the Hot Christian Songs, and No. 12 on the Digital Song Sales. "So So Good" charted at No. 8 on the Hot Christian Songs. The album was also supported by the release of "Song of the Saints" as a promotional single.

On March 13, 2026, a deluxe edition of the album was released. The album featured guest appearances from Crowder, Lauren Daigle, Brandon Lake, Cain, Jamie MacDonald, Elevation Worship, Michael W. Smith, Chris Tomlin, AndyG, Petey Martin, and HGHTS. It was supported by "Fear Has No Power" and "It Really Is Amazing Grace" as singles, and "God Is Good" as a promotional single. "Fear Has No Power" peaked at No. 42 on the Hot Christian Songs chart, while "It Really Is Amazing Grace" peaked at No. 25 on the Hot Christian Songs chart and No. 9 on the Digital Song Sales chart.

== Background ==
Weeks before its official release, Wickham teased "The King Is in the Room", slating its release for February 21, 2025. The song first premiered to Air1 radio stations. Upon release, it was supported by both a music video and lyric video. On March 13, a "chapel sessions" video was released.

On April 11, 2025, Wickham released the song "What an Awesome God", a reimagination of the 1988 song "Awesome God" by Rich Mullins. "What an Awesome God" features the chorus of Mullins' original song, with Wickham adding verses, "modern beats", and a "big choir sound". Wickham had described the song, explaining that,

It's hard to even describe what it means to me to share a small part of the legacy of this song. What started as a fun idea in the studio grew into an unexpected new take on the "Awesome God" story. It has quickly become one of my favorite songs to sing with the church, proudly declaring each night how awesome our God is!

The song was supported by the release of both a lyric video as well as a music video. On May 2, 2025, Wickham released a live performance video of the song being performed at Chris Tomlin's Good Friday concert in Nashville, Tennessee.

On May 30, 2025, "Homesick for Heaven" was released as the album's third single. Wickham mused that,

I've written several songs about Heaven over the years, but "Homesick for Heaven" may be the one that moves me the most. It all started with a line that came out while writing:

"I want to see my children run to Your arms."

That image lit something inside of me—a deep ache and a deeper hope. The thought of my kids experiencing the presence, joy, and healing of Jesus—it undid me. And it reminded me: every human heart was made for that. We were created to walk with God, to live in the fullness of His love, forever. Heaven isn't just a distant dream—it's the truest home, where Jesus reigns, sorrow is no more, and death is gone for good. That promise stirs me—not just for the future, but for how I live right now. I pray this song breathes hope into the brokenhearted and puts wind in the sails of those who are longing for more. This one carries eternity in it.

"Homesick for Heaven" was supported by both a lyric video and music video. On June 12, 2025, a live performance video was released, and on June 16, a piano performance video was released.

On July 2, 2025, Wickham announced "Song of the Saints" for release as the title track for his upcoming album, which he slated for release in September. The song was released as a promotional single on July 12, being supported by a lyric video and music video. On August 11, 2025, an acoustic version of the song was released to YouTube. On August 29, Wickham released a live video of his performance of the song at the Summer Worship Nights Tour.

A version of "So So Good", featuring Brandon Lake and Elevation Worship, was released on August 25. The song was recorded live in Phoenix, Arizona on the Summer Worship Nights Tour.

== Release and promotion ==
Predating the official release of the album, Song of the Saints was made available for preorder. On September 12, 2025, Wickham performed a sold-out album release show in Nashville, Tennessee. The performance was livestreamed by K-Love.

=== Singles and promotional singles ===
"The King Is in the Room" was released on February 21, 2025. "What an Awesome God" followed it, with an April 11 release date. "Homesick for Heaven" was released on May 30, "Song of the Saints" on July 11, and "So So Good" on August 15, 2025.

== Critical reception ==
Professional ratings
Review scores
Source	Rating
365 Days of Inspiring Meida	5/5
Jubilee Cast	4/5

Timothy Yap, signalling in a 4-out-of-5 review for Jubilee Cast, stated that the album is "widescreen cinema-sweeping, luminous, and impossible to ignore", featuring "soaring anthems, reflective moments, and creative risks." However, he criticized that "a few tracks stumble or feel familiar".

== Commercial performance ==
Song of the Saints debuted at No. 42 on the US Billboard 200 and No. 2 on the Top Christian Albums chart. In the UK, the album debuted at 19 on the Official Charts Company's Album Downloads chart and No. 2 on the Christian & Gospel Albums chart.

Song of the Saints became Wickham's biggest chart debut in the UK, and his second biggest in the US, the first being The Ascension (2013).

=== Singles and charting songs ===
The lead single from Song of the Saints, "The King Is in the Room", debuted at its peak of No. 15 on the Hot Christian Songs chart, supported by an entry of No. 4 on the Christian Digital Song Sales. The song charted at No. 4 on Christian Airplay, and No. 5 on Christian AC Airplay.

The following single, "What an Awesome God", debuted at No. 5 on the Hot Christian Songs, later peaking at No. 3. It charted at No. 10 on the Christian Streaming Songs, while also leading on the Christian Digital Song Sales, Christian Airplay, and Christian AC Airplay. The song entered the UK Single Downloads at No. 80, and the Digital Song Sales at No. 8. It debuted at No. 100 on the Billboard Hot 100, and later peaked at No. 96.

"Homesick for Heaven" debuted at its peak position of No. 14 on the Hot Christian Songs and No. 3 on the Christian Digital Song Sales. It also charted at No. 12 on the Digital Song Sales. "Song of the Saints" charted at No. 30 on the Hot Christian Songs, and No. 12 on the Christian Digital Song Sales. "So So Good" charted at No. 8 on the Hot Christian Songs, No. 4 on the Christian Digital Song Sales, and No. 15 on the Christian Streaming Songs.

In the week of the album's chart debut, two album tracks, "Able" and "Running to a Runaway", entered at Nos. 36 and 45, respectively, on the Hot Christian Songs chart.

== Industry awards ==
=== Album ===
Year	Organization	Category	Result	Ref.
2026	Dove Awards	Worship Album of the Year	Won	

=== Song-specific ===
Year	Organization	Nominee / work	Category	Result	Ref.
2025	Dove Awards	"The King Is in the Room"	Worship Recorded Song of the Year	Nominated	
2025	Dove Awards	"The King Is in the Room"	Short Form Music Video of the Year (Performance)	Nominated	
2025	We Love Awards	"What an Awesome God"	Worship Song of the Year	Nominated	
2026	K-Love Fan Awards	"What an Awesome God"	Song of the Year	Nominated	
2026	K-Love Fan Awards	"Homesick for Heaven"	Worship Song of the Year	Won	
2026	Dove Awards	"Homesick for Heaven"	Song of the Year	Nominated	
2026	Dove Awards	"What an Awesome God"	Song of the Year	Nominated	
2026	Dove Awards	"Homesick for Heaven"	Pop/Contemporary Song of the Year	Nominated	
2026	Dove Awards	"What an Awesome God"	Worship Recorded Song of the Year	Nominated	
2026	ASCAP Awards	"The King Is in the Room"	Most Performed Christian Songs	Honored	
2026	ASCAP Awards	"What an Awesome God"	Most Performed Christian Songs	Honored	

== Rankings ==
Year-end lists
Publication	Accolade	Rank	Ref.
New Release Today	Top 10 Worship Albums of 2025	Unordered	

== Track listing ==
All tracks are produced by Jonathan Smith unless noted.

No.	Title	Writer(s)	Producer	Length
1.	"So So Good"	Brandon Lake; Jonathan Smith; Phil Wickham; Steven Furtick		4:30
2.	"Able"	Lake; Wickham; Furtick		4:33
3.	"What an Awesome God"	Smith; Wickham; Rich Mullins		3:31
4.	"Song of the Saints"	Wickham; Furtick		6:00
5.	"Homesick for Heaven"	Smith; Wickham		4:10
6.	"Flowers"	Smith; Wickham		4:37
7.	"The King Is in the Room"	Ethan Hulse; Josh Farro; Phil Danyew; Wickham; Taylor Johnson; Tommy Iceland		4:02
8.	"God Is Good"	Smith; Matt Armstrong; Wickham		4:00
9.	"Running to a Runaway"	Paul Duncan; Wickham		3:59
10.	"Resurrection Story"	Hulse; Jacob Sooter; Wickham		3:54
11.	"Because He Lives (Moment)"	Gloria Gaither; William Gaither		1:50
12.	"What If I Told You" (featuring Billy Graham)	Smith; Wickham	Smith; Shane Becker	2:58
13.	"The Day I Met You"	Chad Carothers; Wickham	Micah Nichols	4:39
14.	"Miracle Maker"	Smith; Wickham		4:35
15.	"Wondrous Cross"	Hulse; Smith; Wickham		4:30
16.	"The Stand (Amen)"	Joel Houston		2:02
Total length:				63:58

== Personnel ==
Credits adapted from Tidal.

- Billy Graham – guest vocals
- Brandon Lake – writer (1–2)
- Chad Carouthers – writer (13)
- David Cook – mixer (11, 15–16)
- Ethan Hulse – writer (7, 10, 15)
- Gloria Gaither – writer (11)
- Jacob Sooter – writer (10)
- Joe LaPorta – masterer
- Joel Houston – writer (16)
- Jonathan Smith – producer (1–12, 14–16), writer (1, 3, 5–6, 8, 12, 14–15)
- Josh Farro – writer (7)
- Matt Armstrong – writer (8)
- Micah Nichols – producer (13)
- Paul Duncan – writer (9)
- Phil Danyew – writer (7)
- Phil Wickham – writer (1–10, 12–13), lead vocals
- Rich Mullins – writer (3)
- Shane Becker – producer (12)
- Steven Furtick – writer (1–2, 4)
- Taylor Johnson – writer (7)
- Tommy Iceland – writer (7)
- William Gaither – writer (11)

== Charts ==
Chart performance for Song of the Saints
Chart (2025)	Peak position
UK Album Downloads (Official Charts)	19
UK Christian & Gospel Albums (OCC)	2
US Billboard 200	42
US Top Christian Albums (Billboard)	2
