= Summer Worship Nights Tour =

2023–25 concert tour by Brandon Lake and Phil Wickham

- Tour by Brandon Lake and Phil Wickham
- Promotional poster for the tour
- Location: United States
- Start date: August 10, 2023
- End date: August 24, 2025
- Legs: 3
- No. of shows: 35
- Supporting acts: KB; We Are Messengers; Hulvey; Josiah Queen
- Website: summerworshipnightstour.com
Brandon Lake chronology
Miracle Nights Tour (2022–23)	Summer Worship Nights Tour (2023-25)	Tear Off The Roof Tour (2024)
Phil Wickham chronology
Singalong Tour 2023 (2023)	Summer Worship Nights Tour (2023–25)	I Believe Tour (2024)

The Summer Worship Nights Tour is a headlining tour by American Christian music artists Brandon Lake and Phil Wickham. The tour features three legs, one throughout 2023 that began on August 10 in Tampa, Florida, and ended on September 2 in San Diego, California, one throughout 2024 that began on August 1 in Detroit, Michigan, and ended on August 28 in Honolulu, Hawaii, and one that starts as a week long cruise (from June 21 to June 26, 2025) then continues with twelve shows across the United States in July and August 2025, and ends with a concert in Sussex, UK on August 24, 2025. The concert on the second leg was the third event ever held at Intuit Dome in Inglewood, California, after its opening a few days prior to that and concerts by Bruno Mars and Olivia Rodrigo.

== Background ==
On March 2, 2023, Brandon Lake and Phil Wickham announced through their social media that they would be embarking on a 12-date summer tour that summer featuring Christian rapper KB. Furthermore, the band announced 4 additional shows at the end of the tour in California that would feature We Are Messengers as the opening act. The tour was a massive success, selling out many of the shows including the ones in Charlotte, Ontario, and Fort Worth among others, leading them to continue the tour into 2024. The tour also caused Lake and Wickham to release music together, specifically the song "People of Heaven" which the duo used to close out their shows during the 2023 run of the tour.

On March 11, 2024, the artists announced the return of the tour through a video posted on their social medias. The tour continued to visit arenas throughout the United States, and also visited the Waikiki Shell in Hawaii. Again, the duo released music together as a result of the tour, this time the song "Love of God". Hulvey was the opening act for all of the 2024 shows.

On March 6, 2025, the duo announced the 2025 edition of the tour, which will visit Europe for the first time and feature Josiah Queen as the opening act for most of the shows.

=== Movie ===
On August 27, 2024, the duo announced a documentary about the tour titled "For the One", which follows Lake and Wickham on their adventure across this tour. The documentary was in theaters nationwide from October 27-29, 2024. It was directed by Noah Taher, produced by Ken Carpenter, and executively produced by Ben Howard.

=== Cruise ===
On June 3, 2024, the duo announced the Summer Worship Nights Cruise 2025, which will sail from June 21-26, 2025, and will visit Nassau, Princess Cays, and Grand Turk.

== Set list ==
The following set list is taken from the show at Bridgestone Arena in Nashville, Tennessee on August 24, 2023. It is not intended to represent all shows on the tour.

1. "Praise You Anywhere"
2. "House of the Lord"
3. "Graves into Gardens"
4. "Battle Belongs"
5. "Rattle!"
6. "This Is Our God"
7. "Count 'Em"
8. "Coat of Many Colors"
9. "Fear Is Not My Future"
10. "Heaven Song"
11. "Too Good to Not Believe"
12. "This Is Amazing Grace"
13. "Honey in the Rock"
14. "It's Always Been You"
15. "House of Miracles"
16. "God of Revival"
17. "Rest on Us"
18. "You're Beautiful"
19. "The Jesus Way"
20. "Talking to Jesus"
21. "I Believe"
22. "Hymn of Heaven"
23. "Holy Forever" / "How Great Is Our God" (Note: Medley performed by Chris Tomlin.)
24. "Same God"
25. "Living Hope"
26. "Gratitude"
27. "People of Heaven"

== Tour dates ==
List of 2023 concerts, showing date, city, state, venue, and opening acts
Date	City	State	Venue	Opening Act
August 10	Tampa	Florida	Amalie Arena	KB
August 11	Charlotte	North Carolina	Bojangles Coliseum	KB
August 12	Norfolk	Virginia	Chartway Arena	KB
August 13	Newark	New Jersey	Prudential Center	KB
August 17	Minneapolis	Minnesota	Target Center	KB
August 18	Hoffman Estates	Illinois	Now Arena	KB
August 19	Indianapolis	Indiana	Gainbridge Fieldhouse	KB
August 20	Reading	Pennsylvania	Santander Arena	KB
August 24	Nashville	Tennessee	Bridgestone Arena	KB
August 25	New Orleans	Louisiana	Lakefront Arena	KB
August 26	San Antonio	Texas	AT&T Center	KB
August 27	Fort Worth	Texas	Dickies Arena	KB
August 30	Ontario	California	Toyota Arena	We Are Messengers
August 31	Fresno	California	Save Mart Center	We Are Messengers
September 1	Sacramento	California	Golden 1 Center	We Are Messengers
September 2	San Diego	California	Viejas Arena	We Are Messengers

List of 2024 concerts, showing date, city, state, venue, and opening acts
Date	City	State	Venue	Opening Act
August 1	Detroit	Michigan	Little Caesars Arena	Hulvey
August 2	Columbus	Ohio	Value City Arena	Hulvey
August 3	Louisville	Kentucky	KFC Yum! Center	Hulvey
August 4	Duluth	Georgia	Gas South Arena	Hulvey
August 8	Hershey	Pennsylvania	Giant Center	Hulvey
August 9	Boston	Massachusetts	TD Garden	Hulvey
August 10	Philadelphia	Pennsylvania	Liacouras Center	Hulvey
August 11	Washington, D.C.		Capital One Arena	Hulvey
August 15	Milwaukee	Wisconsin	UW–Milwaukee Panther Arena	Hulvey
August 16	St. Louis	Missouri	Enterprise Center	Hulvey
August 17	Kansas City	Missouri	T-Mobile Center	Hulvey
August 18	Denver	Colorado	Ball Arena	Hulvey
August 22	Inglewood	California	Intuit Dome	Hulvey
August 23	Oakland	California	Oakland Arena	Hulvey
August 24	Portland	Oregon	Moda Center	Hulvey
August 25	Everett	Washington	Angel of the Winds Arena	Hulvey
August 28	Honolulu	Hawaii	Waikiki Shell	Hulvey

List of 2025 concerts, showing date, city, state, venue, and opening acts
Date	City	State	Venue	Opening Act
July 17	Pittsburgh	Pennsylvania	PPG Paints Arena	Josiah Queen
July 18	Hershey	Pennsylvania	Hersheypark Stadium	Josiah Queen
July 19	Cincinnati	Ohio	Heritage Bank Center	Josiah Queen
July 20	Nashville	Tennessee	Bridgestone Arena	Josiah Queen
July 24	Houston	Texas	Toyota Center	Josiah Queen
July 25	Austin	Texas	Moody Center	Josiah Queen
July 26	Dallas	Texas	American Airlines Center	Josiah Queen
July 31	Phoenix	Arizona	PHX Arena	Josiah Queen
August 1	San Diego	California	Pechanga Arena	Josiah Queen
August 2	Fresno	California	Save Mart Center	Josiah Queen
August 3	Los Angeles	California	BMO Stadium	Josiah Queen
August 24	London	Greater London (Note: Region of the United Kingdom.)	Wiston Estate	—N/a

== See also ==
- Miracle Nights Tour
