= Children of God (Phil Wickham album) =

Studio album by Phil Wickham
- Released: April 22, 2016
- Studio: Beachwood Park (Los Angeles, California); Big Fish Studios (San Diego, California); Calvary Creative Studios (Costa Mesa, California); Mark Foreman's Office (Carlsbad, California); Bebrilliant (Franklin, Tennessee)
- Genre: Christian pop; Christian alternative rock; Christian EDM
- Length: 60:03
- Label: Fair Trade
- Producer: Pete Kipley

Phil Wickham chronology
The Ascension (2013)	Children of God (2016)	Living Hope (2018)

Children of God is the sixth commercial studio album by Phil Wickham. Fair Trade Services released the album on April 22, 2016.

== Critical reception ==
Professional ratings
Review scores
Source	Rating
365 Days of Inspiring Media	4.5/5 stars
CCM Magazine	4/5 stars
The Christian Beat	4.7 stars on a 5 point scale
CM Addict	4/5 stars
Jesus Freak Hideout	4/5 stars 4.5/5 stars 3.5/5 stars
New Release Today	4.5/5 stars
Today's Christian Entertainment	3.7 stars on a 5 point scale
Worship Leader	4.5/5 stars

Awarding the album four stars at CCM Magazine, Matt Conner states, "Popular recording artist and worship leader Phil Wickham recently lost the very thing he’s most known for: his vocal ability. A risky surgery to repair his vocal cords left Wickham wondering if he might not sing again and what means for his identity. The end result is a renewed sense of his spiritual identity in Christ, and a wellspring of new songs on Children Of God...Wickham's learned lesson is a welcome truth for all of us." Taylor Berglund, reviewing the album for Charisma, writes, "Yet even though Children of God's tracks are very sonically different, they mesh and blend well with each other to form a cohesive album. Wickham conveys the love of God and the joy of believers with every song. These songs—though disparate and experimental—never lose sight of the unifying message. Children of God is not merely the best album of Wickham's career. It's a bona fide contender for the best album of this year." Indicating in a four and a half star review at Worship Leader, Jeremy Armstrong states, "this is Phil Wickham at his best."

Giving the album four and a half stars from New Release Today, Mikayla Shriver describes, "Much like Phil Wickham's previous albums, Children of God is a force to be reckoned with. With sincerity and modernity merging into a beautiful display of love for God, you'll find yourself coming back for a second listen... and probably a thousand more." Jonathan Andre, affixing a four and a half star rating upon the album by 365 Days of Inspiring Media, says, "Phil continues to present poignant songs of praise and perseverance as this new set of songs are some of the most emotive and energetic...in his whole career." Signaling in a four star review at Jesus Freak Hideout, David Craft writes, "the album is very cohesive and unable to be dissected in a more traditional manner...this is one of the best worship albums of the year, and will likely remain so." Lucas Munachen, indicating in a four and a half star review from Jesus Freak Hideout, states, "Children of God is mezmerizing in almost every way and may possibly be Wickham's overall best. It's a satisfying and deeply emotional album all the way through." Rating the album three and a half stars for Jesus Freak Hideout, Mark Rice says, "Children of God is a wonderful experience." Christopher Smith, indicating in a four star review from Jesus Freak Hideout, opines, "Children of God is...a strong statement and a wonderful creative outlet to worship Jesus."

Timothy Yap, writing a review of the album at Hallels, states, "But not everything works...'Children of God,' on the whole, is by no means perfect. But it has far too many God-anointed moments that to miss them would be a loss." Rating the album 4.7 out of five stars for The Christian Beat, Chris Major writes, "Maintaining his reputation for energetic and inspiring praise and worship music, Children Of God more than surpasses expectations...From start to finish, Children Of God's beautiful sounds and poetic lyrics combine in a mesmerizing, inspiring blend of praise and worship...making for an outstanding album." Andrew Funderburk, allocating the album four stars by CM Addict, says, "The album sounds like a well-woven tapestry, with careful attention to even the most minute of details." Allotting the album 3.7 stars from Today's Christian Entertainment, Laura Chambers writes, "Children of God uses a moment of weakness, fear and doubt as a jumping-off point for a new appreciation of God’s power, grace and love....Wickham doesn’t disappoint."

== Track listing ==
No.	Title	Writer(s)	Length
1.	"Doxology//Amen" (traditional hymn)	Phil Wickham, Louis Bourgeois, Thomas Ken	4:39
2.	"Better Than Life"	P. Wickham, Pete Kipley	5:19
3.	"Your Love Awakens Me"	P. Wickham, Chris Quilala	3:56
4.	"The Secret Place" (featuring Madison Cunningham)	P. Wickham, Kipley	4:44
5.	"Wide Awake"	P. Wickham, Evan Wickham	5:07
6.	"My All in All"	P. Wickham, Travis Collins	4:49
7.	"Starmaker (Above The Earth)"	P. Wickham	6:43
8.	"Children of God"	P. Wickham	4:35
9.	"Stand in Awe"	P. Wickham	4:05
10.	"Body Mind & Soul"	P. Wickham, Andrew Polfer	4:09
11.	"As It Is in Heaven"	P. Wickham	5:23
12.	"Spirit of God"	P. Wickham, Kipley	6:34
Total length:			60:03

== Personnel ==
- Phil Wickham – vocals, backing vocals, acoustic piano, synthesizers, acoustic guitars, electric guitars
- Pete Kipley – synthesizers, electric guitars, bass, drum machine
- Taylor Johnson – electric guitars
- Joel Plotnik – drums
- Mitch Wohlberg – vibraphone
- Breanne Dürken – backing vocals
- Kala Ellis – backing vocals
- Brad Hendryx – backing vocals
- Jasmine Mullen – backing vocals
- Lauren Murtijdaja – backing vocals
- Rheed Nolan – backing vocals
- Gentry Wigginton – backing vocals
- Madison Cunningham – vocals (4)

=== Production ===
- Pete Kipley – producer, engineer
- Neal Avron – mixing
- Sean Moffitt – mixing
- Joe LaPorta – mastering at Sterling Sound (New York, NY)
- Brandon Breitenbach – design
- Christian Rios – photography
- Grant Jensen – photography
- Phil Wickham – liner notes

== Chart performance ==
Chart (2016)	Peak position
US Billboard 200	72
US Top Christian Albums (Billboard)	3
