= After Your Heart =

Single by Phil Wickham

from the album Cannons
- Released: September 18, 2007
- Genre: Contemporary Christian music, contemporary worship music
- Length: 3:22
- Label: INO
- Songwriter(s): Phil Wickham
- Producer(s): Pete Kipley

Phil Wickham singles chronology
"You're Beautiful" (2007)	"After Your Heart" (2007)	"Heaven & Earth" (2009)

"After Your Heart" is the third single by American contemporary Christian and contemporary worship music singer Phil Wickham from his second studio album, Cannons, the song reached No. 22 on the Billboard Christian songs chart on January 18, 2008.

== Background ==
"Then I go into a song called 'After Your Heart' which is kind of a proclamation saying, Everybody, you listeners and me let's come together and join this revolution that Jesus started about living selflessly and living a life of sacrifice and being a servant. Lets live for holding nothing back instead of wanting to hold everything close, let's let it all go and just surrender." -Phil Wickham

== Reception ==
=== Critical response ===
"After Your Heart" has received generally positive review from music critics.

Russ Breimeier from Christianity Today International: "After Your Heart" comes off hokey and derivative, its rallying cry of "being the revolution" goes beyond clicheacute."

"Phil's channeling Keven Max again on this one. Listen to the drum and bass line on the verses and tell me you're not hooked. The chorus and bridge both have unique rhythm feels apart from the verses, and the little piano melody connects them all together nicely." -Consuming Worship
