= Songs for Christmas =

Songs for Christmas may refer to:

- Songs for Christmas (Sufjan Stevens album), a 2006 Christmas box set studio album by Sufjan Stevens
- Songs for Christmas (Phil Wickham album), a 2010 Christmas studio album by Phil Wickham
