= Grace (Phil Wickham song) =

Single by Phil Wickham

from the album Phil Wickham
- Released: March 21, 2006
- Genre: Christian & Gospel
- Length: 4:46
- Label: INO Records
- Songwriter: Phil Wickham
- Producer: Peter Kipley

Phil Wickham singles chronology
"Grace" (2006)	"Divine Romance" (2006)

"Grace" is the first single by American Christian and gospel singer Phil Wickham from his second album Phil Wickham.

== Background ==
That whole song was inspired by well... actually the Gospel of Luke, in the Gospel of Luke specifically the character Peter, and reading to that Gospel and seeing him actually seeing myself in him..., as a songwriter, as a worship leader, you know just doing my best to write these songs and to live these songs out, you know singing these songs like "Lord, I give you my heart I give you my soul..." and stuff like that, and then just even that day just living differently, I just realizing Gosh, I'm just so unworthy of this, and then, 'cause I was so impacted by the character Peter, I read through the book he wrote, you know First and Second Peter, and it's so amazing to see the difference in Peter, and the Gospel, and the First Peter,'cause he gives us, he says... in season and out of season always be ready to give defense for hope that's in you, and it's so cool to hear that heart coming from this guy who... just to young girls who was afraid to say he knew Jesus, you know what I mean? And all because of the grace of God and through...Jesus affecting his life, and Jesus's changing his life, he got to this place of realization of what is important, and there is so much courage, so much strength, and so much grace, the relationship that we share with Jesus... so that's when i wrote the song called "Grace", and it's like, it's very... has a lot of illusion to that sort of Peter, you know, talks about this guy... "The sea is a rage within my heart I turn my sight to the crashing waves..." kind of that illusion to Peter you know, walking on the water, having the faith to run, but then realizing you never have enough faith you know, it's all about the grace of God the supplies what you need.

— Phil Wickham,

== Critical reception ==
The lead single "Grace" has received positive reviews from the critics:

"The first single, "Grace" serves as a desperate plea to God for His grace to cover humanity and also sets the incredibly emotional tone for the rest of the disc. While there is not a definite theme that runs throughout the album, haunting melodies, with Wickham’s unforgettable vocals, make stand-out cuts such as “Mystery” and “I Adore You” sound both magical and intense." CCM Magazine.

"In a beautiful combination of melody and lyrics, "Grace" fully expresses the pain and darkness of the valleys we all experience. He calls grace out by name, referring to God, and asks for guidance and direction through those hard times in life.' -Associated Content

""Grace" is receiving early praise for its modern-sounding melody woven with Wickham's soaring vocals, which are reminiscent of mainstream acts like Jeff Buckley and Travis." -SongTouch.com

"Songs like "Grace", "Cannons" and "Desire" give us a good example of how talented he is, and especially how passionate is for God." -Christian Rock Rocks

"..."Grace" speak of longing and crashing symbols of gentleness." -Soul Shine

"Maybe it’s his unique vocals, maybe it’s the ethereal chorus work, immediately distinctive in opener "Grace"." -Christian Music About
