= Safe (Phil Wickham song) =

Single by Phil Wickham

from the album Heaven & Earth
- Released: November 03, 2009
- Length: 3:40
- Label: INO Records
- Songwriter(s): Phil Wickham
- Producer(s): Peter Kipley

Phil Wickham singles chronology
"Heaven & Earth" (2009)	"Safe" (2009)	"Cielo" (2009)

"Safe" is the first single by American Christian and gospel singer Phil Wickham from his third studio album Heaven & Earth, which features MercyMe’s frontman Bart Millard. The single has made it into the top 20 on Billboard’s Christian AC and Soft AC/Inspirational charts and reached #4 on the Billboard's Christian songs chart on January 3.

== Background ==
The message relates to many and never gets old. It speaks out to those that are hurting, those that are going through tough things. It’s a reminder that the God who brought sight to the blind and brought the lame to their feet is the same God who holds you in his arms today. It’s my sincere prayer that the simple message of this song would resonate in people’s hearts. I wrote it after a moving conversation I had with a man who told me his story. It was a story of God’s faithfulness during a struggling time. How God can turn things that seem so grim into things that give Him glory. Think of all those that Jesus healed and saved while he was on earth from great tragedy and sickness and even death. It gave people all the more reason to praise Him!

— Phil Wickham,

== Collaboration ==
I am so honored that Bart Millard, who has become a good friend and is the lead singer of MercyMe, is a guest vocalist on the song “Safe”! This wasn’t planned, it just kind of happened and I’m thrilled with the result. In a way, Bart gave me my “start”, so to speak, when he believed enough in what the Lord was doing through my music to take me out on a MercyMe tour when I was just starting out. Now, three albums later, it was an amazing feeling to bring him into my sphere of things. I’m always amazed with how good that guy can sing!

— Phil Wickham,

== Reception ==
=== Critical response ===
"Safe" has received extremely positive review from most critics.

Kevin Davis from Christian Music Review writes that Safe "serve[s] to encourage, strengthen and remind listeners that they are not alone as [the lyrics] say, 'You will be safe in His arms, You will be safe in His arms, the hands that hold the world are holding Your heart, this is the promise He made He will be with You always, when everything is falling apart you will be safe in His arms.' "

"The first time I listened to Phil’s single Safe, I was amazed over how the message connected and really appreciate its relevance to all that is going on in the world these days," says WAY-FM Network Program Director, Tate Luck. "The sound is fresh and Bart Millard’s participation is a great touch!"

" Safe certainly does live up to its name in terms of being a song that will tickle the fancies of Contemporary Christian radio programmers looking for something different to play. Don’t get the song wrong, though; Wickham’s bright baritone overflows with passion as he sings about how safe we are in the arms of our Savior." -Gannsdeen.com

=== Chart performance ===
The song has reached #4 on the Billboard's Christian songs chart on January 3, and made it up to #31 and #32 Top 300 iTunes Christian & Gospel Song Downloads/Top 300 iTunes Inspirational Song Downloads respectively, the song also entered top 10 spot on the USA Today Christian chart, and #7 on the Top 10 Christian Music Hits Chart of Christian Music About on its debut week.

Chart (2009–2010)	Peak position
U.S. Christian songs	4
Christian Music Hits	7
USA Today Christian	10
