= Make Us One =

Studio album by Evan Wickham
- Released: December 2, 2013
- Genre: CCM, worship, pop rock
- Length: 51:32
- Label: Evan Wickham
- Producer: Peter Kipley

Evan Wickham chronology
Above the Sky (2009)	Make Us One (2013)

Make Us One is the third studio album by American Christian singer Evan Wickham. He released the album on December 2, 2013. Wickham worked with Peter Kipley, in the production of this album.

== Critical reception ==
Professional ratings
Review scores
Source	Rating
Indie Vision Music	4/5 stars
Worship Leader	5/5 stars

Awarding the album five stars from Worship Leader, Andrea Hunter describes, "Evan Wickham's Make Us One is among the most expansive and cinematic modern worship albums since Gungor's Ghosts Upon the Earth." Jonathan Andre, giving the album four stars for Indie Vision Music, states, "Make Us One is a worship album to remember, right up there with Worth It All (Meredith Andrews), The Ascension (Phil Wickham) and Hope Will Rise (Warr Acres) as some of my favourite worship albums of 2013 (pity I didn’t hear the album when I made my top 20 albums list, otherwise Evan Wickham would be there for sure!)."

== Track listing ==
Track listing
No.	Title	Writer(s)	Length
1.	"Make Us One"	Bryan Brown, Michael Gungor, Aaron Keyes, Evan Wickham	4:31
2.	"Come for Us"	Peter Kipley, Michael Anthony Ketterer, Jr., Wickham	4:58
3.	"Intimacy"	Kipley, Wickham	4:02
4.	"The Day That He Returns"	Tyler Chester, Wickham	4:33
5.	"Risen"	Benjamin John Kolarcik, Robert Joseph Pfeiffer, Wickham	5:16
6.	"Human Soul"	Kipley, Wickham	4:32
7.	"Celebrate"	Chester, Wickham	5:20
8.	"No One like You"	Chester, Matt Maher, Wickham	4:18
9.	"Don't Give Up"	Wickham	4:24
10.	"Shepherd of My Soul"	Chad Bohi, Wickham	4:10
11.	"Yours Is the Kingdom"	Wickham	5:28
Total length:			51:32
