= Response (album) =

Studio album by Phil Wickham
- Released: October 4, 2011
- Genre: Contemporary worship
- Length: 45:32
- Label: Fair Trade Services
- Producers: Brown Bannister; Pete Kipley

Phil Wickham chronology
Songs for Christmas (2010)	Response (2011)	The Ascension (2013)

Response is the fourth commercial studio album by contemporary worship musician Phil Wickham. It was released on October 4, 2011 by label Fair Trade Services, his fourth album released under that label. The album was produced by Brown Bannister and Pete Kipley.

== Background ==
=== Life ===
Wickham was asked by Bill Lurwick that people may describe this a worship album, and to this Wickham responded by saying "I grew up leading worship ever since I was like 13 years old. I was just like the youth group worship leader back in junior high. It’s always been a big part of what I do and I think if you listen to all my past records, songs that people can sing are sprinkled throughout them all. The whole thought of worship is definitely like – we’ve got some more songs written to God than about other things." Wickham went onto further respond, when he said "It’s always been a big part of what I do, but this really was the goal of this record. It was on my heart to try to put together a record of songs I could sing with people, and hopefully if they fit, into certain churches. I just love to serve the Church with new songs; hopefully they can sing some of them."

=== Theme behind Response ===
The word response is a great definition of what worship is. It's responding to who God is and what He's done It's Kind of a formula for worship —God reveals himself, whether it be through his creation or with what he's doing in our hearts or through the Word. He reveals Himself in some way and our hearts just automatically respond to all that God is. That's when worship happens. There's no song called "Response" on Response; it's just what I want the entire record to be...and then calling other people into that response as well. Something I can sing with the church and with the people...

— Phil Wickham,

=== Tim Hughes ===
Wickham and Tim Hughes co-wrote the song "At Your Name" together. The story behind it was that "after leading worship at a conference in London with 1500 worship leaders. The next day we were playing around with some ideas...and the idea there's no higher name than God." The conference was at Soul Survivor Church that Hughes invited him to come in order to lead some worship with members of Wickham's church.

== Critical reception ==
Professional ratings
Review scores
Source	Rating
Allmusic	3.5/5 stars
CCM Magazine	4/5 stars
Christian Music Zine	3/5 stars
Christianity Today	4/5 stars
Cross Rhythms	10/10 squares
Indie Vision Music	4/5 stars
Jesus Freak Hideout	4.5/5 stars
Louder Than The Music	4/5 stars
Melodic.net	3.5/5 stars
New Release Tuesday	4/5 stars

Allmusic's Matt Collar said "Response is a melodic and epic blast of modern rock uplift that showcases Wickham's yearning vocals." Collar wrote "longtime fans of Wickham's previous work as well as anyone inclined toward spiritual-leaning, adult alternative rock will find much to enjoy on Response."

Alpha Omega News' Elise F. graded the album an A+, and said "Response is a beautiful story of the heart’s response to God’s love. Phil Wickham has once again created a worshipful masterpiece that will please both longtime fans and new listeners alike."

CCM Magazine's Matt Conner said "the latest release from Phil Wickham features his trademark atmospheric tunes anchoring vertical lyrics, but the tunes on Response are steeped in stong synth work that adds a new layer to Wickham's work."

Christian Music Zine's Tyler Hess said "The heart is there and the voice is always powerful and stirring, though I think the songs need a little bit more sizzle in them to maintain my attention over an extended period of time, as they tend to put me in more of a dreamy daze than a get up and go spirit. I don’t really think that this is the best output from Wickham and some of the songs were just a little too generic for what his skill dictates, but there’s enough on here to pick it up if you’re a fan of his earlier work."

Christianity Today's Andy Argyrakis said "Wickham's a true original thanks to clever wordplay, adventurous arrangements, and the ability to strike just the right balance between reverence and resourcefulness."

Cross Rhythms' Tim Holden said "this at first hearing may seem like stereotypical modern worship. But a closer listen will reveal the songwriting craft and skilful production which go into each of Wickham's albums and this could easily be his strongest yet." Holden wrote "It is a sign of the maturity and depth of this album that no one track jumps out as being head and shoulders above the rest and that any two listeners will probably choose different tracks as their favourite while the Scripture-based lyrics draw us continually back to the Godhead."

Indie Vision Music's Jonathan Andre said "is one of my favourite worship albums in 2011, and if you want to continue to dive into the Lord’s presence; look no further than Phil’s latest effort."

Jesus Freak Hideout's Tyler White said "Response is perhaps his most mainstream album to date". White wrote "It would be easy to dismiss this album as a step back for Wickham, since the feel of the album seems a bit Vanilla compared to his Neapolitan past, but that would be a disservice to his talent. Wickham's songwriting is in a higher caliber than most songs on Christian radio right now, and the San Diego songster pours his heart out with solid arrangements and beautiful thought-out metaphors that feel natural and uncontrived."

Jesus Freak Hideout's Ryan Barbee said "sadly, I must say that the album as a whole does not reach the standards that Wickham had established with his previous releases. Still, there are some incredible glimpses of genius even if they take a couple of listens before they can be observed. But for this reviewer, the response is still very mixed."

Louder Than The Music's Jono Davies said "to summarise, this is a very good album. Great creative songs, great voice and great expressions of praise to God (a few too many great's there maybe). But there is something that's stopping me saying this is an outstanding album. What that is, I'm not sure. But when you hear it, you just know, and on this album I don't always hear it. But overall this is a good, and I'll even use that word again, a great album. Maybe given time this will grow on me more, but for now I am more than willing to express that you should check this out and actually make up your own mind.

Melodic.net's Kaj Roth said the "album is filled with anthemic pop/rock songs".

New Release Tuesday's Kevin Davis said "Wickham provides listeners with eleven tracks that seek to give a voice to humanity’s acceptance of God’s love in any circumstance. In the same way that the Psalms offer expressions of joy, sorrow, repentance, hope and victory, Response gives a voice to the appreciation and adoration of God in every chapter of life." Davis wrote "Phil Wickham’s enthusiastic and reverent style of writing and singing praise and worship songs has consistently been a draw for me. Wickham’s prayerful sentiments are consistently filled with his personal adoration of God."

Phantom Tollbooth's Michael Dalton said "Wickham is doing modern worship as well as anyone. He is among the leaders of a new generation that are declaring God’s praises." Dalton wrote this is album is "a powerful God calls for powerful worship, and this song like so many on this release conveys it."

== Track listing ==
Track list
No.	Title	Writer(s)	Length
1.	"Heaven Fall Down"	Pete Kipley, Phillip LaRue, Phil Wickham	5:16
2.	"Joy"	Jason Ingram, Kipley, P. Wickham	3:48
3.	"One God"	Kipley, P. Wickham	3:47
4.	"At Your Name (Yahweh, Yahweh)"	Tim Hughes, P. Wickahm	3:54
5.	"This Is the Day"	Evan Wickham, P. Wickham	3:28
6.	"All I Want Is You"	Ingram, Kipley, P. Wickahm	4:21
7.	"God of Our Salvation"	P. Wickham	4:20
8.	"Sun & Moon"	Kipley, P. Wickham	4:30
9.	"This Love Will Last Forever"	Ingram, Kipley, P. Wickham	3:28
10.	"All I Am"	Mallory Wickham, P. Wickham	3:43
11.	"The Victory"	P. Wickham	4:57
Total length:			45:32

== Personnel ==
- Phil Wickham – lead vocals, backing vocals, acoustic guitars, electric guitars
- Pete Kipley – programming, guitars, bass guitar
- Joe Williams – programming
- Taylor Johnson – electric guitars
- Will Sayles – drums (1, 2, 4–9, 11)
- Ben Phillips – drums (3)
- Joel Plotnik – drums (5, 8, 9)
- Steve Bowman – violin (8)

== Production ==
- Brown Bannister – producer, recording
- Pete Kipley – producer, recording
- Andy Hunt – recording
- Steve Churchyard – recording
- Warren David – digital editing
- Joe Williams – digital editing
- Christian Rios – art direction, photography
- Ryan Strong – graphic design
- BrickHouse Entertainment – management

== Charts ==
=== Album ===
Chart (2011)	Peak position
US Billboard 200	43
US Billboard Christian Albums	3
US Billboard Digital Albums	13

=== Singles ===
Year	Single	Peak chart positions	
Year	Single	US Christian Songs	US Christian AC
2011–12	"At Your Name (Yahweh, Yahweh)"	18	24
