= Heaven and Earth =

Heaven and Earth may refer to:

== Film ==
- Heaven and Earth (1990 film), a Japanese samurai film
- Heaven & Earth (1993 film), directed by Oliver Stone, based on the memoir When Heaven and Earth Changed Places
  - Heaven & Earth (soundtrack), the official musical score for the film composed by Japanese composer Kitarō
- Heaven and Earth, a 2012 film directed by Marleen Gorris

== Music ==
- "Heaven and Earth", a song on the 1989 Kylie Minogue album Enjoy Yourself
- Heaven and Earth (Al Jarreau album), 1992
  - "Heaven and Earth", a song from the album which won the 1993 Grammy Award for Best Male R&B Vocal Performance
- Heaven and Earth, a 1999 album by Stuart Smith (musician)
- Heaven and Earth (ProjeKct X album), 2000
- Heaven & Earth (Phil Wickham album), 2009
  - "Heaven & Earth" (song), the title song from the above album
- Heaven and Earth, a 2010 album by Nathan Haines
- Heaven and Earth (John Martyn album), a 2011 album by John Martyn
- Heaven & Earth (Yes album) (2014)
  - List of Yes concert tours (2000s–10s)#Heaven & Earth Tour 2014–2015
- Heaven and Earth (Kamasi Washington album), 2018
- Heaven & Earth (King Crimson box set), 2019

== Television ==
- The Heaven and Earth Show, a BBC series running from 1998 to 2007
- Heaven and Earth, a 1957 ITV "Play of the Week" scripted and directed by Peter Brook
- Heaven & Earth, a 2007 South Korean series
- "Heaven and Earth" (Due South), a 1995 episode

== Fiction ==
- Samurai: Heaven and Earth, a 2005 comic book
- Heaven and Earth, an 1821 drama by Lord Byron

== Non-fiction ==
- When Heaven and Earth Changed Places by Le Ly Hayslip
- Heaven and Earth, a popular science book by Ian Plimer

== Other uses ==
- Heaven & Earth (video game), a 1992 video game
- Heaven and Earth (figure skating program), by Japanese figure skater Yuzuru Hanyu
- Tenjho Tenge (English: Heaven and Earth), a Japanese manga series and anime
- Tiandihui or Heaven and Earth Society, Chinese secret society
- Holy Marriage Blessing Ceremony of the Parents of Heaven and Earth, a 2003 special Blessing ceremony of the Unification Church
- Yin and yang, an ancient Chinese philosophy concept
- Heaven and Earth, a brand of ice teas from Coca-Cola sold in South East Asia
- Himmel und Erde (English: Heaven and Earth), a traditional German dish
