= Phil Wickham (album) =

Studio album by Phil Wickham
- Released: April 25, 2006
- Studios: The Groove Masters (Nashville, Tennessee)
- Genres: Contemporary Christian music, contemporary worship music
- Length: 54:00
- Label: INO
- Producer: Pete Kipley

Phil Wickham chronology
Give You My World (2003)	Phil Wickham (2006)	Cannons (2007)

Singles from Phil Wickham
- 1. "Grace" Released: March 21, 2006; 2. "Divine Romance"; 3. "I Will Wait For You There"; 4. "Mystery"

Phil Wickham is the first commercial album recorded by American Christian and worship music singer Phil Wickham, released on April 25, 2006.

== Critical reception ==
Professional ratings
Review scores
Source	Rating
The-Trades.com	4/5 stars
Christianity Today	4/5 stars
Melodic.net	3/5 stars

Phil Wickham has received generally positive reviews from most music critics.

"The lyrics are vertical in nature, with the majority of the tracks being completely acoustic, stripped and raw with little or no help from BGVs. But perhaps that is what makes this debut so inviting. The ease with which the emotive lyrics drip off Wickham's tongue really draws the listener in." '-Lindsay Williams from CCM Magazine

"...virtually every song builds from humble acoustic beginnings to a cymbal-crashing climax. While this might seem exciting, rather it elicits a "sameness" that brings a somnolent quality to the whole album." -Paul Schultz from The Trades

"His lyrical dexterity is solid throughout the mix of acoustic ballads and sonic rockers; likewise, he manages to inject a deep sense of intimacy in either groove... He uses strings to perfection to add an atmospheric quality to many tracks, and the effect is only magnified with his richly layered arrangements and passionate delivery" -Christian Music About

"I wouldn't be surprised if Phil had just pressed record on a tape recorder, gotten lost in the beauty of prayer, and found in playback God was really leading Him to the lyrics for this record, that's how freeflowing the CD is, the tracks continue each other, building upon thoughts, longing, and maintaining confidence of God's Word by trusting Him with your life. An excellent view of worship from the honesty of a heart flooded with grace." -Soul Shine

"Every song on the record is an adventure, which made making the record an unforgettable experience" Kipley says. "Phil has such an incredible sense of melody, lyrics that read like poetry, and I believe the listener will leave with feelings of the greatness of God, and at the same time the desire for God to have an intimate relationship with us."

"With his influences dating back to his parents' tenure as a part of the Jesus Movement in bands The Way and Parable and with tunes reminiscent of Coldplay, there's a beautiful simplicity that makes Wickham's album truly unique." -CCM Magazine.

"I guess Phil Wickham from San Diego grew up listening to some of the artists I mentioned, he is also inspired by the modern singer/songwriter style where John Mayer comes in mind." -Melodic.net

"Phil Wickham combines a west coast ethic that channels the pop sensibilities of Coldplay with the emotive lyrics of singer songwriters like John Mayer."

"Shades of Sixpence None the Richer's genius mixed with Coldplay's melancholy charms, Wickham's music is lavishly poetic and compelling." -Christian Music About

"His vocal vibratos remind me of Jeff Buckley, but Wickham is more controlled, less improvisational than Buckley." -Soul Shine

"... for its modern-sounding melody woven with Wickham's soaring vocals, which are reminiscent of mainstream acts like Jeff Buckley and Travis." -SongTouch.com

== Track listing ==
All tracks are written by Phil Wickham.

No.	Title	Length
1.	"Grace"	4:47
2.	"Messiah"	3:56
3.	"Mystery"	5:22
4.	"Divine Romance"	4:58
5.	"Yours Alone"	4:03
6.	"I Will Wait for You There"	4:13
7.	"I Adore You"	3:58
8.	"Always Forever"	4:41
9.	"Crumble to Pieces"	4:15
10.	"Fall into You"	4:24
11.	"Holy Holy Holy"	4:02
Total length:		48:47

The lead single, "Grace", received positive reviews from critics.

== Personnel ==
- Phil Wickham – vocals, acoustic piano acoustic guitars, electric guitars, baritone guitar, banjo
- Chris Donahue – bass
- Elijah Thomson – bass
- Brandon Lozano – drums
- Roy G. Biv String Vibe – strings
- Vlade Flemingovoch – concertmaster

Production

- Pete Kipley – producer
- Mike "X" O'Connor – recording
- Steve Lotz – recording assistant
- F. Reid Shippen – mixing
- Andrew Mendelson – mastering at Georgetown Masters (Nashville, Tennessee)
- BrickHouse Entertainment – management
