= Bart Millard =

American singer and songwriter (born 1972)

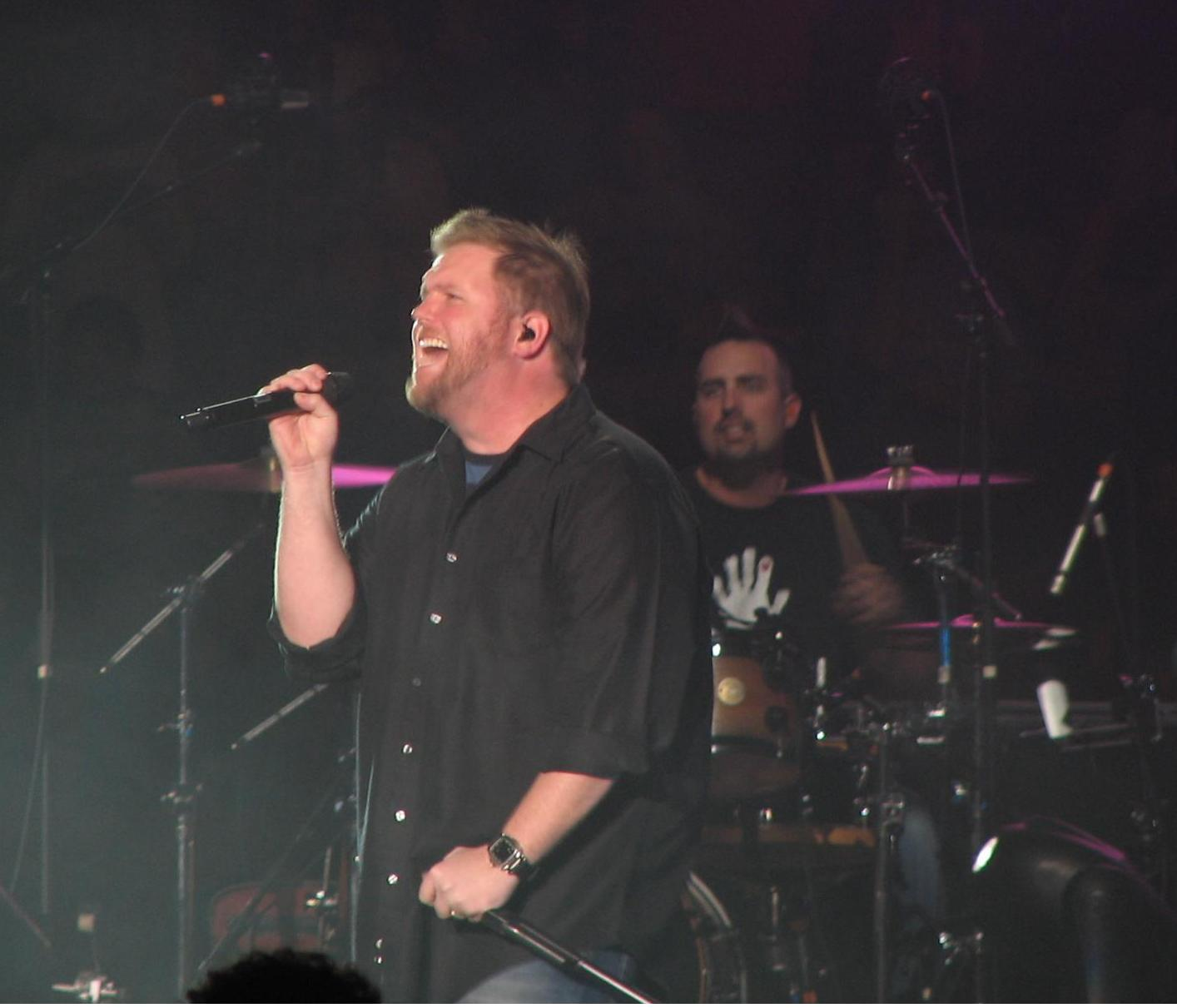
- Millard in 2008

Background information
- Born: Bart Marshall Millard; December 1, 1972 (age 53); Greenville, Texas, U.S.
- Genre: Rock · Christian rock · CCM
- Occupation: Singer · songwriter
- Instrument: Vocals
- Years active: 1994–present
- Label: Fair Trade Services
- Website: bartmillard.org

Bart Marshall Millard (born December 1, 1972) is an American singer and songwriter who is best known as the lead singer of Christian rock band MercyMe. He has also released two solo albums: Hymned, No. 1, in 2005 and Hymned Again in 2008. He received a solo Grammy nomination in the category of Best Southern, Country, or Bluegrass Gospel Album for the latter album.

== Band career ==
In high school, Millard wanted to become a football player, a dream which ended when he injured both ankles at a high school football game. As a result, Millard took choir as an elective. Millard's father, Arthur Wesley Millard Jr., died in 1991, during Bart's first year of college, and his youth pastor invited him to work with the church's youth group worship band. Millard accepted and worked with the video and audio systems for the group. James (Jim) Bryson played the piano for that band and later went on to play with Bart Millard and the worship band on a trip to Switzerland.This trip inspired Millard to pursue a full-time musical career. Millard earned an art scholarship in Baylor in 1991. They later met the guitarist Michael John Scheuchzer, who joined them, then moved to Oklahoma City. They formed MercyMe in 1994 at Henderson Hills Baptist Church in Edmond, Oklahoma. Since then, the band has recorded six independent, ten studio, two Christmas, and three compilation albums.

== Solo career ==
Millard made a promise to his grandmother to record an album of hymns before she died, which he did with Hymned No. 1, and he subsequently shared the story of how he was inspired by his grandmother's faith. Millard made the second of his two hymn albums because he realized that the church he was attending did not sing hymns and he wanted his children to have hymns as a part of their lives.

Millard said his dad heavily influenced him in his musical direction with respect to the hymn albums, drawing particularly on Willie Nelson and Louie Prima. Millard stated that these influences would not be appropriate for MercyMe, as MercyMe is similar to Coldplay, while these hymns are more in the vein of Frank Sinatra. Millard said that he embarked on his solo effort in order to give expression to musical styles that would not have been compatible with MercyMe. Millard said that they sang a Hank Williams song called "I Saw the Light" in his church growing up.

The title of Hymned Again is a "tongue-in-cheek" reference to the first album. The first album was an effort to make songs that he did not particularly care about cooler, and the second album was created to achieve a Kansas City swing/shuffle mood in the vein of Louie Prima, Harry Connick Jr. and Jamie Cullum, which is what was achieved. According to Greer, this album was very reminiscent of She by Connick, which was done five or six times according to Millard. Millard said he accomplished this by listening to a stack of albums by these musicians. Millard said the songs on the album Hymned Again are in the tradition of the Great Revival era musically, but that this was not done on purpose. Millard said the one original song on the album, titled "Jesus Cares for Me", was written by Thad Cockrell, a song that, according to the singer, "could’ve been written 50, 60 years ago." Millard nervously asked Vince Gill to participate on the album. On the possibility of a future "Hymned" effort, Millard said, "Man, I hope so."

Millard is featured as a vocalist on "I See Love", a 2004 single by Third Day and Steven Curtis Chapman. He is also featured as a backing vocalist on Phil Wickham's 2009 single "Safe".

== Awards ==
Millard was deemed the Best Male Vocalist by Christianity Today in 2005 for his work on his solo album Hymned No. 1 and for The Christmas Sessions album with MercyMe. Millard's Hymned No. 1 was ranked No. 9 on Christianity Today's Best Christian Albums of 2005.

== Film ==
Millard's song "I Can Only Imagine" was inspired by his father's death, and was made into a film also titled I Can Only Imagine. The film was released on March 16, 2018.

Millard's life journey continues in a second film, I Can Only Imagine 2, released in theaters February 2026.

== Personal life ==
Millard is from Greenville, Texas. He is married to Shannon and they live in Franklin, TN. They have five children: Sam, who is also a singer and songwriter and just signed a record deal himself, Gracie, Charlie, Sophie, and Miles.

Millard's mother Adele left him with his abusive father when he was just a boy. They have since reconciled, and she died in July 2022.

Arthur Wesley Millard Jr., Bart's father, abused him as a boy. However, Arthur became a Christian later in life. Bart and he made amends before Arthur died of pancreatic cancer in 1991.

== Discography ==
=== Albums ===
Title	Album details	Peak chart positions		
Title	Album details	US	US Christian	US Heat
Hymned, No. 1	Released: August 16, 2005; Label: INO Records; Format: CD, digital download	—	12	13
Hymned Again	Released: August 19, 2008; Label: INO Records; Format: CD, digital download	126	8	—

=== Guest appearances ===
Year	Artist	Album	Song
2002	Steven Curtis Chapman, Out of Eden, Jennifer Knapp, Jeremy Lubbuck Jody Moreing, Lila McCann, Joy Williams, Jody Moreing, and Warren Ham	Let's Roll: Together In Unity, Faith, and Hope	"The Lords Prayer" "To You Be the Glory"
2004	Third Day and Steven Curtis Chapman	The Passion of the Christ: Songs	"I See Love"
2007	Phil Wickham	Cannons	"The Light Will Come"
2009	Phil Wickham	Heaven & Earth	"Safe"
2011	Apostles Church	Love Came Through	"Jesus, Name Above All Names"
2012	Big Tent Revival	The Way Back Home	"The Weight"
2013	Hawk Nelson	Made	"Words"
2014	Francesca Battistelli, Jamie Grace, Jeremy Camp, Matt Maher, and Dave Frey	non-single album	"Hope Can Change Everything"
2018	Citizen Way	Love Is A Lion	"WaveWalker"
2018	Ryan Stevenson	No Matter What	"No Matter What"
2019	Gloria Gaynor	Testimony	"He Won't Let Go"
2019	TobyMac	The St. Nemele Collab Sessions	"Overflow (Willyecho Remix)"
