= This Is Our God (song) =

2023 song by Phil Wickham

Single by Phil Wickham

from the album I Believe
- Released: January 13, 2023
- Genre: Contemporary worship music
- Length: 4:26
- Label: Fair Trade Services
- Songwriters: Brandon Lake; Pat Barrett; Phil Wickham; Steven Furtick
- Producer: Jonathan Smith

Phil Wickham singles chronology
"Then Christ Came" (2022)	"This Is Our God" (2023)	"Sunday Is Coming" (2023)

Music videos
- "This Is Our God" on YouTube
- "This Is Our God" (Lyrics) on YouTube

"This Is Our God" is a song by American contemporary Christian musician Phil Wickham. The song was released on January 13, 2023, as the lead single from Wickham's ninth studio album, I Believe. Wickham co-wrote the song with Brandon Lake, Pat Barrett, and Steven Furtick. Jonathan Smith produced the single.

"This Is Our God" peaked at number two on the US Hot Christian Songs chart. At the 2023 GMA Dove Awards, "This Is Our God" was nominated for the Worship Recorded Song of the Year award.

== Background ==
On January 8, 2023, Phil Wickham announced that he will release "This Is Our God" on January 13 as the lead single previewing his upcoming studio album. On January 13, 2023, Phil Wickham released "This Is Our God." The single comes as Wickham had received GMA Dove Awards for Worship Recorded Song of the Year with "Hymn of Heaven," Worship Album of the Year with Hymn of Heaven (2021), and Songwriter of the Year (Artist) at the 2022 ceremony, as well as 2023 Grammy Award nominations for Best Contemporary Christian Music Performance/Song for "Hymn of Heaven" and co-writing Chris Tomlin's song, "Holy Forever." Wickham spoke of the song, saying "When we sing about our God, we sing about a God who loves without condition, who gives grace to the sinner, who saves the one who calls out, who pulls people out of the pit and brings them into His heavenly kingdom. This is our God. A God who saves, a God who redeems, a God who makes beauty from ashes and a God who renews. This is our manifesto. I cannot wait to sing this song with the church. This is our God."

== Composition ==
"This Is Our God" is composed in the key of C with a tempo of 80 beats per minute and a musical time signature of 4/4.

== Critical reception ==
Jonathan Andre, reviewing for 365 Days of Inspiring Media review, gave a positive remarks about the song, describing it as "something new and exciting, unique, powerful, and enjoyable," commending Wickham for making "such a powerful worship song."

=== Awards and nominations ===
Awards
Year	Organization	Award	Result	Ref
2023	GMA Dove Awards	Worship Recorded Song of the Year	Nominated	
2024	GMA Dove Awards	Song of the Year	Nominated	

== Commercial performance ==
"This Is Our God" debuted at number 15 on the US Hot Christian Songs chart dated January 28, 2023, concurrently charting at 26 on the US Christian Airplay chart, and number 29 on the Digital Song Sales chart, dated January 28, 2023.

== Music videos ==
Phil Wickham published the official music video for "This Is Our God" on January 13, 2023, as well as the song's lyric video, through YouTube.

== Charts ==
=== Weekly charts ===
Weekly chart performance for "This Is Our God"
Chart (2023)	Peak position
US Hot Christian Songs (Billboard)	2
US Christian Airplay (Billboard)	1
US Christian AC (Billboard)	1
US Digital Song Sales (Billboard)	29

=== Year-end charts ===
Year-end chart performance for "This Is Our God"
Chart (2023)	Position
US Christian Songs (Billboard)	3
US Christian Airplay (Billboard)	1
US Christian AC (Billboard)	1

== Certifications ==
Region	Certification	Certified units/sales
United States (RIAA)	Gold	500,000^{‡}
^{‡} Sales+streaming figures based on certification alone.

== Release history ==
Release history and formats for "This Is Our God"
Region	Date	Format	Label	Ref.
Various	January 13, 2023	Digital download; streaming	Fair Trade Services	
United States	February 24, 2023	Christian radio	Fair Trade Services	
