= The Ascension (Phil Wickham album) =

Studio album by Phil Wickham
- Released: September 24, 2013
- Genres: Contemporary worship music, contemporary Christian music
- Length: 48:49
- Label: Fair Trade
- Producer: Pete Kipley

Phil Wickham chronology
Response (2011)	The Ascension (2013)	Children of God (2016)

Singles from The Ascension
- 1. "This Is Amazing Grace" Released: August 6, 2013; 2. "Glory" Released: 2014

The Ascension is the fifth commercial studio album from Christian singer and songwriter Phil Wickham. The album was released on September 24, 2013 by Fair Trade Services, and was produced by Pete Kipley. The album has seen commercial charting successes as well as garnering critical acclamation from music critics.

== Background and release ==
The album was released on September 24, 2013 by Fair Trade Services, and produced by Pete Kipley. It is the fifth studio album by Phil Wickham.

== Critical reception ==
Professional ratings
Review scores
Source	Rating
CCM Magazine	3/5 stars
Christian Music Review	4.9/5
Christian Music Zine	4.5/5 stars
CM Addict	4/5 stars
Cross Rhythms	9/10 squares
Indie Vision Music	4/5 stars
Jesus Freak Hideout	4.5/5 stars 4/5 stars
Louder Than the Music	4.5/5 stars
New Release Tuesday	4.5/5 stars
Worship Leader	4.5/5 stars

The Ascension garnered critical acclaim from music critics. Elliot Rose of Cross Rhythms called it "An impressive album which will certainly help solidify Wickham's position as an innovative worship songwriter." At Worship Leader, Andrea Hunter alluded to how "Phil Wickham, whether alone with a guitar or in a sea of fresh and refreshing accompaniment, brings something to the worship table that is often missing: emotional power and transparency, melodic and creative originality, unexpected lyrical turns and an escape from 'more of the same.'" Grace S. Aspinwall of CCM Magazine told that "Phil Wickham has already proven he is a masterful songwriter, and gifted worship leader", which "The Ascension is no different."

At Jesus Freak Hideout, Ryan Barbee proclaimed that Wickham was "bringing listeners what they love with more fervor than ever before", and noted that this was an "excellent combination of all of Phil Wickham's previous offerings with dashes of enough newness to make it certifiably fresh." Mark Rice of Jesus Freak Hideout highlighted that "Between the scope that has almost the feel of a concept album, and simply yet another solid musical performance [...] Phil Wickham has definitely unleashed another winner into the modern worship circle." Kevin Davis of New Release Tuesday felt the album took him "to another realm of holiness and thirsting for God's presence." At Indie Vision Music, Jonathan Andre called this "an enjoyable and heartfelt album!"

Jono Davies of Louder Than the Music told that "the wonderful distinctive voice of Phil Wickham is well worth checking out." At Christian Music Zine, Joshua Andre felt that this was "one of the most profound, transparent, and honest albums of the year, and you certainly don't want to miss this unique and God-inspired experience", which the album "will complement and add plenty to anyone's music collection", and praised the artist "for reinventing the electronic worship setting!" Laura Chambers of Christian Music Review highlighted that "Phil Wickham invites us to climb higher in search of God and promises that if we make The Ascension, we will never regret it for a moment." At CM Addict, Brianne Bellomy called this "yet another amazing project."

== Commercial performance ==
For the Billboard charting week of October 12, 2013, The Ascension was the No. 39 most sold album in the entirety of the United States by the Billboard 200, and it was the No. 2 Top Christian Album sold the same week.

== Track listing ==
Standard (studio) edition
No.	Title	Writer(s)	Length
1.	"The Ascension"	Phil Wickham	4:18
2.	"Holy Light"	Wickham, Pete Kipley	3:45
3.	"Carry My Soul"	Wickham	4:42
4.	"This Is Amazing Grace"	Wickham, Joshua Farro, Jeremy Riddle	4:39
5.	"Over All"	Wickham, Kipley	4:28
6.	"When My Heart Is Torn Asunder"	Wickham	4:18
7.	"Mercy"	Wickham	4:08
8.	"Glory"	Wickham, Kipley	4:01
9.	"Tears of Joy"	Wickham, Kipley	4:34
10.	"Wonderful"	Wickham, Chris Tomlin	4:15
11.	"Thirst"	Wickham	5:41
Total length:			48:49

Deluxe (acoustic) edition
No.	Title	Writer(s)	Length
12.	"The Ascension"	Wickham	3:46
13.	"Holy Light"	Wickham, Kipley	3:43
14.	"Carry My Soul"	Wickham	4:16
15.	"This Is Amazing Grace"	Wickham, Farro, Riddle	4:27
16.	"Over All"	Wickham, Kipley	4:39
17.	"When My Heart Is Torn Asunder"	Wickham	4:15
18.	"Glory"	Wickham, Kipley	3:51
19.	"Tears of Joy"	Wickham, Kipley	3:59
20.	"Wonderful"	Wickham, Tomlin	4:26
21.	"Thirst"	Wickham	4:57
Total length:			91:07

== Chart performance ==
Chart (2013)	Peak position
US Billboard 200	39
US Top Christian Albums (Billboard)	2
