= Echoing Angels =

American Christian rock band

- Origin: Atlanta, Georgia, United States
- Genres: Christian rock, country rock
- Years active: 1999–present
- Label: eOne Entertainment
- Website: echoingangels.com

Echoing Angels is a Christian rock group from Atlanta, Georgia.

== History ==
The band was initially formed by bassist Josh Armour and drummer Jon Poole under the name Two Bare Feet in 1999. They spent several years working the independent Christian music scene before a single, "You Alone", began to get airplay locally in Atlanta. The group then signed to INO Records, a subsidiary of Columbia Records, and changed their name to Echoing Angels due to copyright issues. Their 2007 debut album, You Alone, peaked at No. 19 on Billboard's Top Heatseekers chart and No. 26 on its Top Christian Albums chart.

== Members ==
Current

- Jon Poole – drums
- Josh LeBlanc – bass
- Trey Heffinger – vocals
- Shannon Cochran – guitar
- Neil Tankersley – keyboard/vocals

Former

- Jared Lee – guitar
- Jeffery Box – keyboard/vocals
- Chris Peevy – vocals (before Feb 2008)
- Josh Armour – bass

== Discography ==
- Demo EP (Self-released, 2004)
- You Alone (INO/Columbia, 2007)
- Echoing Angels (eOne, 2011)
