= Give You My World =

Studio album by Phil Wickham
- Released: September 22, 2003
- Recorded: 2002–2003
- Genre: Christian
- Length: 51:45
- Labels: Independently released and distributed
- Producers: Philip Wickham, John Wickham

Phil Wickham chronology
Give You My World (2003)	Phil Wickham (2006)

Give You My World is the debut studio album by American contemporary Christian musician Phil Wickham. It was independently released on September 22, 2003. Produced by Wickham and his father and recorded in a small home studio, the album gained popularity quickly, especially in the Calvary Chapel affiliation.

Give You My World has two songs that have been recorded on other projects by Wickham. "Jesus Lord of Heaven" was also featured on the 2001 album, Worship Generation as well as Wickham's second major release, Cannons. The song "Shining" is also revisited on Cannons.

== Background ==
Encouraged by his father, Wickham recorded his first independent CD, Give You My World, in his late teens, and it was met with a good response. Although Wickham said it had no formal marketing, Give You My World found its way around the country—and that included selections sung at The Vine. ”I have no idea how they got it” Wickham said.

== Comparison ==
"The style of his music is very evocative of bands like Jars of Clay and Lifehouse and this album would definitely appeal to fans of that genre, but the strong worship style of his songwriting and emotional vocals would also make this album sit nicely alongside a Matt Redman CD." Cross Rhythms.

"In attempts to describe Wickham's music, writers have made comparisons to the British band Coldplay, singer/songwriter Rufus Wainwright and Queen's frontman Freddie Mercury. Wickham laughed, adding, ”I like Coldplay. I like Freddie Mercury, so that's a compliment.” In truth, Wickham said, his sound probably is that broad. He said he’s influenced by artists who are honest, bare their hearts and take a fresh approach to song writing—and that covers a multitude of genres." Southeast Christian.

== Critical reception ==
Give You My World has received positive reviews from Cross Rhythms. Heather Marsden: "All his songs feature powerful lyrics with really strong choruses and catchy riffs... From the opening bars of the first song to the last note on the album you can tell this is something special, all I can say is try and get hold of a copy."

== Track listing ==
Give You My World

No.	Title	Length
1.	"Give You My World"	3:37
2.	"Jesus, Lord of Heaven"	6:24
3.	"Shining"	5:42
4.	"Still Your Love Goes On"	4:44
5.	"You Are Everything"	4:52
6.	"Take My Heart"	3:40
7.	"Capture My Heart"	4:32
8.	"High Above"	4:22
9.	"Marvelous"	5:38
10.	"How It Turned Out"	4:29
11.	"All For You"	3:43

== Personnel ==
- Phil Wickham – vocals, guitars
- Sean Cimino – guitars, background vocals
- Eddie Gonzalez – bass
- Paul Droste – drums

=== Additional musicians ===
- Evan Wickham – acoustic piano, synth, guitars, background vocals
- John Wickham – electric guitar
- Joel Plotnik – percussion
- Darrel Cook – bass
- Fred Field – fiddle, mandolin
