= Songs for Christmas (Phil Wickham album) =

Studio album by Phil Wickham
- Released: October 28, 2010
- Genres: Contemporary worship music, contemporary Christian music, Christmas music
- Length: 36:43
- Label: INO
- Producer: Pete Kipley

Phil Wickham chronology
Heaven & Earth (2009)	Songs for Christmas (2010)	Response (2011)

Songs for Christmas is the first holiday studio album from contemporary worship musician Phil Wickham, and the album released on October 28, 2010 by INO Records. The album has seen commercial charting success, as well as, it has garnered critical acclamation from music critics.

== Background and release ==
The album was released on October 28, 2010 by INO Records, and it was the first holiday studio album by Phil Wickham.

== Music and lyrics ==
At Worship Leader, they compared his voice to the likes of Andrew Bird and Rufus Wainwright, but noted that they do not hold a candle to his voice, which was the best instrument used in the making of the album. Also, they wrote that all of the classic hallmarks of a Wickham album are present from the "guitars, keys, angelic-sounding choirs, even a banjo sprinkled in for good measure." Tyler Hess of Christian Music Zine wrote how the album was not "much of a rock album, more like slow tempo pop ballads".

== Critical reception ==
Professional ratings
Review scores
Source	Rating
The Christian Music Review Blog	3.5/5 stars
Christian Music Zine	4/5 stars
Christianity Today	4/5 stars
Cross Rhythms	9/10 squares
Jesus Freak Hideout	4.5/5 stars
Worship Leader	5/5 stars

Songs for Christmas garnered critical acclaim from music critics. Andrew Greer of Christianity Today rated the album four stars, and proclaimed the album to feature some "delightful artistry." At Worship Leader, they rated the album a perfect five stars, and noted how his original sounding voice comes "drip[ing] with passion". Brendan O'Regan of Cross Rhythms rated the album nine out of ten squares, which he felt that for his sake the album "comes close to being the perfect Christmas album", and highlighted that the cover art was esthetically pleasing. At Jesus Freak Hideout, Ryan Barbee rated the album four-and-a-half stars, and commented that the album was simply "incredible". Tyler Hess of Christian Music Zine rated the album four stars, which he said the album was just "nice", and the album should "[bring] a soft comfort for those looking forward to enjoying the Holiday." At The Christian Music Review Blog, Jonathan Kemp rated the album three-and-a-half stars, and wrote that the listener should just get the songs they liked rather than buying the whole project because it was not the "best" of Christmas albums.

== Track listing ==
No.	Title	Writer(s)	Length
1.	"Prelude"		1:02
2.	"The First Noel"		3:59
3.	"Silent Night"		3:48
4.	"O Come, O Come Emmanuel"		4:38
5.	"Oh Holy Night"		4:21
6.	"Christmas Time"	Phil Wickham	3:41
7.	"Have Yourself a Merry Little Christmas"	Ralph Blane, Hugh Martin	3:05
8.	"The Little Drummer Boy"	Katherine K. Davis, Henry Onorati, Harry Simeone	4:37
9.	"Evermore"	Phil Wickham, Matt Maher, Leeland Mooring	3:33
10.	"O Come All Ye Faithful"		4:08
Total length:			48:49

== Charts ==
Chart (2010)	Peak position
US Top Christian Albums (Billboard)	24
