= I Believe (Phil Wickham album) =

Studio album by Phil Wickham
- Released: August 18, 2023
- Genre: Worship
- Length: 63:03
- Labels: Fair Trade Services; Columbia
- Producer: Jonathan Smith

Phil Wickham chronology
Hymn of Heaven (2021)	I Believe (2023)	Song of the Saints (2025)

Singles from I Believe
- 1. "This Is Our God" Released: January 13, 2023; 2. "Sunday Is Coming" Released: April 7, 2023; 3. "The Jesus Way" Released: May 19, 2023

Professional ratings
Review scores
Source	Rating
365 Days of Inspiring Media	4.5/5
Jesus Freak Hideout	3/5 stars
Jubilee Cast	4.5/5
Today's Christian Entertainment	4.6/5 stars

I Believe is the tenth studio album by American contemporary Christian musician Phil Wickham. It was released on August 18, 2023, by Fair Trade Services and Columbia Records. The album features a guest appearance by Tiffany Hudson and Naomi Raine. Selling 7,000 first-week copies, 3,000 of which in traditional album units, the album debuted atop the Billboard Top Christian Albums chart.

The album has been supported by the release of three singles, "This Is Our God", "Sunday Is Coming", and "The Jesus Way". "This Is Our God" peaked at No. 1 on the Billboard Christian Airplay chart. The album has also been supported by the release of "I Believe" as a promotional single.

== Accolades ==
Awards
Year	Organization	Award	Result	Ref.
2024	Dove Awards	Worship Album of the Year	Won	
2024	Grammy Awards	Best Contemporary Christian Music Album	Nominated	

Year-end lists
Publication	Accolade	Rank	Ref.
Louder Than The Music	LTTM Album Awards	4	

== Track listing ==
I Believe track listing
No.	Title	Length
1.	"This Is Our God"	4:25
2.	"I Believe"	5:02
3.	"Sunday Is Coming"	4:52
4.	"Creator"	4:16
5.	"Praise the Lord"	4:59
6.	"The Jesus Way"	4:43
7.	"Wait"	5:02
8.	"Psalm 23" (featuring Tiffany Hudson)	4:34
9.	"Isn't He Good"	4:18
10.	"100%"	3:51
11.	"Your Name Is Holy"	5:04
12.	"Holy Moment" (with Naomi Raine)	2:23
13.	"Relationship"	3:38
14.	"Back to Life"	5:56
Total length:		63:03

== Charts ==
=== Weekly ===
Weekly chart performance for I Believe
Chart (2023)	Peak position
UK Album Downloads (Official Charts)	28
UK Christian & Gospel Albums (Official Charts)	7
US Digital Albums (Billboard)	5
US Top Album Sales (Billboard)	44
US Top Christian Albums (Billboard)	1

=== Year-end ===
Year-end chart performance for I Believe
Chart (2024)	Position
US Top Christian Albums (Billboard)	13
Chart (2025)	Position
US Top Christian Albums (Billboard)	20
