= Hymn of Heaven =

2021 studio album by Phil Wickham

Studio album by Phil Wickham
- Released: June 25, 2021
- Recorded: 2020
- Genre: Contemporary worship; contemporary Christian music
- Length: 58:49
- Label: Fair Trade Services; Columbia
- Producer: Jonathan Smith; Ran Jackson; Ricky Jackson; Kyle Lee; Adrian Disch; Taylor Johnson; Jason Ingram

Phil Wickham chronology
Christmas: Acoustic Sessions (2020)	Hymn of Heaven (2021)	I Believe (2023)

Singles from Hymn of Heaven
- 1. "Battle Belongs" Released: September 4, 2020; 2. "House of the Lord" Released: April 2, 2021; 3. "Hymn of Heaven" Released: February 11, 2022

Hymn of Heaven is the eighth studio album by American contemporary Christian singer Phil Wickham. It was released on June 25, 2021, by Fair Trade Services and Columbia Records. The album features a guest appearance by Brandon Lake.

The album has been supported by the release of "Battle Belongs", "House of the Lord" and "Hymn of Heaven" as singles. "Battle Belongs" peaked at No. 13 on the Bubbling Under Hot 100 chart, and No. 2 on the Hot Christian Songs chart. "House of the Lord" peaked at No. 12 on the Bubbling Under Hot 100 chart, and No. 1 on the Hot Christian Songs chart. "Hymn of Heaven" peaked at No. 2 on the Hot Christian Songs chart. "It's Always Been You" was released as a promotional single. Hymn of Heaven will be promoted with the Nights of Worship tour, followed by the Singalong Tour and the 2022 Hymn of Heaven Tour, spanning cities across the United States.

The album debuted at No. 1 on Billboard's Top Christian Albums Chart in the United States, and at No. 6 on the Official Charts' Official Christian & Gospel Albums Chart in the United Kingdom. At the 2021 GMA Dove Awards, "Battle Belongs" was nominated for the GMA Dove Award for Worship Recorded Song of the Year. The album was nominated for the Billboard Music Award for Top Christian Album at the 2022 Billboard Music Awards. At the 2022 GMA Dove Awards, Hymn of Heaven won the GMA Dove Award for Worship Album of the Year, the title track won the GMA Dove Award for Worship Recorded Song of the Year, and "House of the Lord" was nominated for two GMA Dove Awards: Song of the Year and Pop/Contemporary Song of the Year.

== Background ==
Billboard first reported that Hymn of Heaven was Phil Wickham's upcoming studio album, slated for release on June 25, 2021, following the No. 1 peak of "Battle Belongs" on the Christian Airplay chart. Wickham collaborated with various songwriters such Jonathan Smith, Jason Ingram, Ethan Hulse, Brian Johnson, Ricky and Ran Jackson, Passion City's Sean Curran, Hillsong's Chris Davenport, Bethel Music's Kalley Heiligenthal, and Brandon Lake, whose vocals are also featured on the song "Where I'm Standing Now". Wickham described the album as being "full of praise and thankfulness, just lifting up the name of Jesus and speaking what we know the reality is even though we don't see it," further adding that his intention was to "facilitate moments where people can encounter the presence of God."

== Release and promotion ==
=== Singles ===
"Battle Belongs" was released as the lead single of Hymn of Heaven on September 4, 2020. "Battle Belongs" peaked at No. 13 on the Bubbling Under Hot 100 chart, and No. 2 on the Hot Christian Songs chart. At the 2021 GMA Dove Awards, "Battle Belongs" was nominated for the GMA Dove Award for Worship Recorded Song of the Year.

"House of the Lord" was released as the second single from the album on April 2, 2021. "House of the Lord" peaked at No. 12 on the Bubbling Under Hot 100 chart, and at No. 1 on the Hot Christian Songs chart. At the 2022 GMA Dove Awards, "House of the Lord" was nominated for the GMA Dove Awards for Song of the Year and Pop/Contemporary Song of the Year.

"Hymn of Heaven" was released as the third single from the album on February 11, 2022. "Hymn of Heaven" peaked at No. 2 on the Hot Christian Songs chart. At the 2022 GMA Dove Awards, "Hymn of Heaven" won the GMA Dove Award for Worship Recorded Song of the Year.

=== Promotional singles ===
On May 12, 2021, Phil Wickham announced that "It's Always Been You" will be released on May 14, 2021. "It's Always Been You" was released as the first promotional single from the album, concurrently launching the album's pre-order. "It's Always Been You" peaked at No. 27 on the Hot Christian Songs chart.

== Touring ==
In promotion of Hymn of Heaven, Wickham will embark on the Night Of Worship tour in the spring and summer, along with festival dates throughout the summer. Wickham will also embark on the Singalong Tour alongside Pat Barrett and Brandon Lake in various cities across the United States in the fall of 2021.

Phil Wickham announced the 2022 Hymn of Heaven Tour, spanning 32 cities across the United States with Josh Baldwin featuring as a special guest.

== Reception ==
=== Critical response ===
Professional ratings
Review scores
Source	Rating
365 Days of Inspiring Media	5/5
Jesus Freak Hideout	3/5 stars
JubileeCast	3.75/5
Today's Christian Entertainment	4.5/5 stars

Jonathan Andre in his 365 Days of Inspiring Media review congratulated Wickham for the album, saying: "Well done Phil for such a project that stands tall amongst many of the worship album releases of 2021 so far. This is a perfect album for anyone who has enjoyed much of Phil's music catalogue previously, or those who love and appreciate worship-style music with more of a creative edge.". In a positive review for Worship Leader, Caitlin Lassiter said of the album: "From top to bottom, Hymn of Heaven is one of the most lyrically encouraging, profound and impactful worship records I’ve ever heard. Aiding Wickham’s stunning vocal, the content of this album is carefully crafted to offer churches a dozen new declarations for their people that lift their eyes to Jesus and pour hope into their hearts." In a NewReleaseToday review, Kevin Davis wrote a positive review of the album, saying "This album provides listeners with songs that proclaim acceptance of God’s love in any circumstance. Hymn of Heaven provides words of appreciation and adoration of God. Phil's enthusiastic and reverent style of writing and singing praise and worship songs has consistently been a draw for me. His prayerful sentiments are consistently filled with his personal adoration of God. I've felt that he's improved with each new album and this is my top worship album of the year." Abby Thigpen, indicating in a positive review at Today's Christian Entertainment, said "I love how worship albums have evolved in more recent years. No longer can we only praise God with just piano and old English, but with a wide variety of joyful noises, including those found throughout Hymn of Heaven. I ended this album feeling rejuvenated and with a renewed sense of awe and wonder for our Heavenly Father."

Jesus Freak Hideout's Josh Balogh said in his lacklustre review of the album: "while the album as a whole is a classic mixed bag, the songs that nail it really do. Wickham is one of the better voices in the genre, and he continues to write hopeful and encouraging songs for the believer to belt at church and at home. Next time out, it would be nice to see some experimentation or a greater depth of lyric, perhaps better balancing the devotional songs with the congregational ones." Timothy Yap of JubileeCast concluded in his review of the album: "Hymn of Heaven may not be perfect, but it does have its celestial moments."

=== Accolades ===
Awards
Year	Organization	Award	Result	Ref
2022	Billboard Music Awards	Top Christian Album	Nominated	
2022	GMA Dove Awards	Worship Album of the Year	Won	

Year-end lists
Publication	Accolade	Rank	Ref.
365 Days of Inspiring Media	Top 40 Albums of 2021	1	
Louder Than The Music	LTTM Album Awards 2021	6	
NewReleaseToday	Best of 2021: Top 10 Albums of the Year	—	

== Commercial performance ==
In the United States, Hymn of Heaven earned 6,000 equivalent album units in its first week of sales, and as a result debuted at No. 1 on the Top Christian Albums Chart dated July 10, 2021, becoming Wickham's third No. 1 entry on the chart.

== Track listing ==
No.	Title	Writer(s)	Producer(s)	Length
1.	"Battle Belongs"	Phil Wickham; Brian Johnson	Jonathan Smith	4:47
2.	"Hymn of Heaven"	Wickham; Brian Johnson; Bill Johnson; Chris Davenport	Jonathan Smith	4:27
3.	"House of the Lord"	Wickham; Jonathan Smith	Jonathan Smith	4:16
4.	"It's Always Been You"	Wickham; Ricky Jackson; Ran Jackson	Ran Jackson; Ricky Jackson	4:01
5.	"Where I'm Standing Now" (featuring Brandon Lake)	Wickham; Brandon Lake; Brian Johnson	Kyle Lee	4:30
6.	"Reason I Sing"	Wickham; Smith	Jonathan Smith	4:28
7.	"His Name Is Jesus"	Wickham; Brian Johnson; Lake; Kalley Heiligenthal; Davenport; Dominic Shahbon	Kyle Lee	5:21
8.	"1,000 Names"	Wickham; Taylor Johnson; Adrian Disch; Sean Curran	Adrien Disch; Taylor Johnson	5:44
9.	"Falling in Love"	Wickham; Smith; Curran; Melodie Malone	Jonathan Smith	4:45
10.	"Look to Jesus"	Wickham; Jason Ingram; Ethan Hulse	Jason Ingram	4:42
11.	"God of Revival"	Wickham; Brian Johnson	Jonathan Smith	5:20
12.	"3:16 (Spontaneous)"	Wickham; Brian Johnson; Lake; Heiligenthal; Davenport; Shahbon	Jonathan Smith	2:28
13.	"Heart Full of Praise"	Wickham; Ingram; Hulse	Jason Ingram	4:00
Total length:				58:49

== Charts ==
=== Weekly charts ===
Weekly chart performance for Hymn of Heaven
Chart (2021)	Peak position
UK Christian & Gospel Albums (OCC)	6
US Christian Albums (Billboard)	1
US Independent Albums (Billboard)	37
US Top Album Sales (Billboard)	51

=== Year-end charts ===
Year-end chart performance for Hymn of Heaven
Chart (2021)	Position
US Christian Albums (Billboard)	39
Chart (2022)	Position
US Christian Albums (Billboard)	7
Chart (2023)	Position
US Christian Albums (Billboard)	8
Chart (2025)	Position
US Christian Albums (Billboard)	27

== Release history ==
Release history and formats for Hymn of Heaven
Region	Date	Format(s)	Label(s)	Ref.
Various	June 25, 2021	Digital download; streaming	Fair Trade Services; Columbia	
