= This Is Amazing Grace =

Single by Phil Wickham

from the album The Ascension
- Released: August 6, 2013
- Genre: CCM; adult contemporary
- Length: 4:40
- Label: Fair Trade
- Songwriters: Phil Wickham, Josh Farro, Jeremy Riddle
- Producer: Pete Kipley

Phil Wickham singles chronology
"This Is the Day" (2012)	"This Is Amazing Grace" (2013)	"Glory" (2014)

"This Is Amazing Grace" is the lead single on Phil Wickham's fifth studio album The Ascension. It was released on August 6, 2013, by Fair Trade Services, and it was written by Wickham, Josh Farro and Jeremy Riddle, and produced by Pete Kipley. Billboard named it No. 1 on the Christian Airplay Songs chart for 2014. This song was released originally by Jeremy Riddle on the album For the Sake of the World with Bethel Music.

== Background ==
Phil Wickham and Josh Farro wrote "This is Amazing Grace" back when Farro was still with Paramore. They wrote the song in 20 minutes and recorded a lo-fi demo. It was passed around until Jeremy Riddle of Bethel Church heard it and asked to rewrite the verses. It was then recorded for Bethel's worship album For the Sake of the World. The lyrics are based on 2 Corinthians 6:18 and Revelation 5:11-13. It also takes inspiration from John Newton’s hymn "Amazing Grace".

For Wickham's album The Ascension, he sang it the way Bethel recorded it but made it more upbeat and added a synthesizer. It was produced by Pete Kipley, who has worked with MercyMe and Matt Redman.

== Commercial performance ==
"This is Amazing Grace" reached number one on Billboard's National Christian Audience Chart and on the Christian AC Monitored and Christian AC Indicator Charts. It also topped Billboard's 2014 Christian Airplay Song Year End Chart at No. 1.

"This is Amazing Grace" was certified gold by the Recording Industry Association of America (RIAA) in 2015. In July 2018, the song was certified platinum by RIAA.

== Usage in media ==
"This is Amazing Grace" was featured on the soundtrack for the 2019 film Breakthrough. The film version features Christian rapper Lecrae.

== Charts ==
=== Weekly charts ===
Chart (2014)	Peak position
Bubbling Under Hot 100 (Billboard)	24
Christian Songs (Billboard)	2
Christian AC (Billboard)	1
Christian Hot AC/CHR (Billboard)	20
Christian Airplay (Billboard)	1
Christian Digital Songs (Billboard)	3
Christian Soft AC (Billboard)	6

=== Year-end charts ===
Chart (2014)	Position
US Christian Songs (Billboard)	4
US Christian Airplay (Billboard)	1
US Christian AC (Billboard)	1

=== Decade-end charts ===
Chart (2010s)	Position
US Christian Songs (Billboard)	16

== Certifications ==
Region	Certification	Certified units/sales
United States (RIAA)	Platinum	1,000,000^{‡}
^{‡} Sales+streaming figures based on certification alone.
