= Chad Carothers =

American painter and designer

- Other name: Chad Cantcolor
- Occupation: Artist

Chad Carothers, also known by his artist name Chad Cantcolor, is an American contemporary freehand painter and designer.

== Career ==
Chad Carothers began customizing articles of clothing for his classmates during his school days. He began his career as an artist in 1998, working in Los Angeles in the field of freehand painting. His work included the creation of custom surfboards and manufacturing designs for surfboard and wakeboard makers. He has also worked on the creation of custom hand-painted and designed trucks, including a 2015 Chevy Silverado Sport Truck.

Carothers worked with Adidas to produce limited-edition hand painted cleats for Justin Turner during the 2017 World Series, for which Carothers created different themes for each game. He has produced hand painted custom shoes for Nike athletes as well. In 2019 Carother's work was shown at the BET Experience festival in Los Angeles. Chad Carothers has also worked as a cover artist for musical albums.

== Exhibitions ==
In 2008 pieces from Carother's collection Lost Enterprises of San Clemente were shown in the John Wayne Airport. In 2009 Carother's work was a part of the Disney's Stitch Experiment 626 Project Custom Art Tour, in which he adapted a Stitch figure to look like Mickey Mouse.
