= Cannons (album) =

Studio album by Phil Wickham
- Released: October 2, 2007
- Recorded: May–August 2007
- Studios: Lusk (Nashville, Tennessee)
- Genre: Contemporary Christian music
- Length: 49:00
- Label: INO
- Producer: Pete Kipley

Phil Wickham chronology
Phil Wickham (2006)	Cannons (2007)	Heaven & Earth (2009)

Singles from Cannons
- 1. "True Love" Released: 2007; 2. "After Your Heart" Released: September 18, 2007; 3. "Cannons" Released: 2007; 4. "You're Beautiful" Released: 2007

Professional ratings
Review scores
Source	Rating
AllMusic	4/5 stars
Jesus Freak Hideout	4/5 stars
Patrol Magazine	5.9/10
Soulshine	4/5 stars

Cannons is the second commercial studio album by American contemporary Christian singer Phil Wickham, released on October 2, 2007. The album debuted at No. 16 on the Billboard Christian Albums chart.

== Track listing ==
All tracks are written by Phil Wickham except where noted.

No.	Title	Writer(s)	Length
1.	"Must I Wait"		4:04
2.	"After Your Heart"		3:22
3.	"Desire"	Pete Kipley, Wickham	3:18
4.	"Cannons"		4:09
5.	"Sailing On a Ship"		4:39
6.	"The Light Will Come"		3:45
7.	"Shining"		4:11
8.	"You're Beautiful"		4:53
9.	"True Love"		4:13
10.	"Jesus Lord of Heaven"		4:28
11.	"Home"		4:05
12.	"Spirit Fall"		4:17
Total length:			49:00

== Personnel ==
- Phil Wickham – vocals, acoustic guitars, electric guitars, acoustic piano (11)
- Gabe Scott – dobro (5), lap steel guitar (5, 6)
- John Wickham – electric guitars (10, 11)
- Pete Kipley – programming, bass
- Joel Plotnik – drums (1, 3, 11)
- Jeremy Lutito – drums (2)
- Dan Bailey – drums (4–10, 12)
- Roy G. Biv String Vibe – strings (4, 11)
- Amelia Emery – backing vocals (5)
- Savannah Packard – backing vocals (8)

Production

- Pete Kipley – producer
- Mike "X" O'Connor – recording
- F. Reid Shippen – mixing (1–4, 11, 12)
- Buckley Miller – mix assistant (1–4, 11, 12)
- Lee Bridges – mixing (5–8, 10)
- Tom Laune – mixing (9)
- Dan Shike – mastering at Tone and Volume Mastering (Nashville, Tennessee)
- Christian Rios – art direction, photography
- Jed Bridges – design, layout

== Charts ==
Chart (2009–2010)	Peak position
U.S. Billboard Christian Albums	16
