= It's Always Been You =

2021 song by Phil Wickham

Promotional single by Phil Wickham

from the album Hymn of Heaven
- Released: April 23, 2021
- Recorded: 2020
- Genre: Contemporary worship music
- Length: 4:01
- Label: Fair Trade Services
- Songwriter(s): Phil Wickham; Ran Jackson; Ricky Jackson
- Producer(s): Ran Jackson; Ricky Jackson

Music video
- "It's Always Been You" on YouTube
- "It's Always Been You" (Lyrics) on YouTube

"It's Always Been You" is a song by American contemporary Christian musician Phil Wickham. The song was released on May 14, 2021, by Fair Trade Services as the first promotional single from his eighth studio album, Hymn of Heaven (2021). Wickham co-wrote the song with Ran Jackson and Ricky Jackson. Ran Jackson and Ricky Jackson produced the song.

"It's Always Been You" peaked at No. 27 on the US Hot Christian Songs chart.

== Background ==
On May 12, 2021, Phil Wickham announced that "It's Always Been You" will be released on May 14, 2021, as the next song to promote his upcoming album Hymn of Heaven slated for June 25.

== Composition ==
"It's Always Been You" is composed in the key of G♭ with a tempo of 73 beats per minute and a musical time signature of 4/4.

== Accolades ==
Year-end lists
Publication	Accolade	Rank	Ref.
365 Days Of Inspiring Media	Top 50 Music Videos of 2021	31	

== Commercial performance ==
"It's Always Been You" debuted at No. 27 on the US Hot Christian Songs chart dated May 29, 2021, concurrently charting at No. 4 on the Christian Digital Song Sales chart.

== Music videos ==
The official music video as well as the lyric video of "It's Always Been You" were both published on Phil Wickham's YouTube channel on May 14, 2021.

== Charts ==
Weekly chart performance for "It's Always Been You"
Chart (2021)	Peak position
US Christian Songs (Billboard)	27

== Release history ==
Region	Date	Format	Label	Ref.
Various	May 14, 2021	Digital download (promotional release); streaming (promotional release)	Fair Trade Services	
