= Evan Wickham =

American pastor and musician (born 1981)

- Born: Evan Matthew Wickham; May 14, 1981 (age 44); San Diego, California, U.S.
- Origin: Portland, Oregon, U.S.
- Genres: CCM; CWM; pop rock
- Occupation: Musician
- Instruments: Vocals; guitar
- Years active: 2006–present
- Website: Official website

Evan Matthew Wickham (born May 14, 1981) is an American Christian pastor and musician with a focus on Contemporary Christian Music and Christian worship music.

== Early life ==
Evan Matthew Wickham was born on May 14, 1981, in San Diego, California to John and Lisa Wickham (née, Irwin). Previously members of the 1970s Christian band Parable, his mother was the group's lead vocalist and his father was the lead guitarist. Wickham attended church as a child and teenager at the non-denominational Maranatha Chapel in San Diego, where his father was a worship leader. Wickham's younger brother is the Contemporary Christian singer-songwriter Phil Wickham. He also has a younger sister named Jillian.

== Career ==
Wickham's music career began in 2006 with the studio album Mysterious Things released on April 6, 2006. He released Above the Sky on December 4, 2009. He also released Christmas Music Vol. 1 on October 12, 2012. The subsequent album, Make Us One, was released on December 2, 2013. All four albums were independently released.

After 2013, Wickham concentrated on pastoral duties with his church. He has created some music with other CCM artists. In 2024, he sang with his brother on the Hallelujah! It’s Christmas! album.

== Personal life ==
As a young adult, Wickham lived in Vista, California, where he attended the local Calvary Chapel and led worship. It was during this time that he served as the church's youth pastor for middle school and high school aged teens. He later served at Horizon Christian Fellowship in San Diego as worship leader. After relocating to Portland, Oregon in 2013, Wickham was appointed an elder and worship leader at "A Jesus Church" on the westside of the city. In 2017, Wickham and his returned to San Diego, starting Park Hill Church there.

Wickham and his wife currently live in San Diego.

== Discography ==
Albums

- Mysterious Things (April 6, 2006)
- Above the Sky (December 4, 2009)
- Christmas Music Vol. 1 (October 2, 2012)
- Make Us One (December 2, 2013)
- Christmas Music Vol. 2 (December 1, 2024)
