= Heaven & Earth (Phil Wickham album) =

Studio album by Phil Wickham
- Released: November 17, 2009
- Studios: Signature Sound (San Diego, California); Abbey Road Studios (London, UK)
- Genres: Contemporary Christian music, contemporary worship music
- Length: 47:54
- Label: INO
- Producer: Pete Kipley

Phil Wickham chronology
Cannons (2007)	Heaven & Earth (2009)	Songs for Christmas (2010)

Singles from Heaven & Earth
- 1. "Heaven & Earth" Released: October 27, 2009; 2. "Safe" Released: November 3, 2009; 3. "Cielo" Released: November 10, 2009; 4. "In My Love" Released: August 6, 2010 (Radio)

Heaven & Earth is the third commercial studio album by the American Christian and gospel singer Phil Wickham, released on November 17, 2009. The album debuted on No. 4 on Billboard's Hot Christian Albums chart after selling nearly 14k albums with more than 40 percent of album sales in digital, making his highest chart debut on Billboard 200 at No. 55.

The acoustic version of Heaven & Earth is an exclusive to the pre-order of the full-length album, contains the unplugged acoustic version of his new record.

The expanded edition of Heaven & Earth is only available for digital download via iTunes on August 31, 2010, the exclusive edition includes four new songs, the new single "In My Love", "Great In My Live", a remix version of "Eden", and "One Who Overcomes" which was also included in the collection album "Catalyst Music Project". On the same day, Phil also released his second live recording "Singalong" album, which includes fourteen his previous hits (incl. "Cannons" and "Divine Romance"), the album is only available for two months on iTunes.

Christian Music Review named the album "One of the Top Albums of 2009".

== Background ==
=== Theme behind Heaven & Earth ===
On this new one Heaven and Earth, the music is more talking about the story that we are a part of - we were lost even before we were born, but now because of what Jesus did, we have the possibility of being found. I've got heaven on my mind all the time. I love talking about it, I'm reading these books about it and making sure everything I'm singing about on the record is all theologically correct. I'm just really, really excited about the whole theme of eternity."

— Phil Wickham,

== Critical reception ==
Professional ratings
Review scores
Source	Rating
Jesus Freak Hideout	4.5/5 stars
Allmusic	4/5 stars
Melodic	4.5/5 stars
ChristianMusic Review	5/5 stars
CCM Magazine	5/5 stars

Heaven & Earth has received positive reviews from most music critics.

Nathaniel Schexnayder from Jesus Freak Hideout: "Throw in Wickham's previous compelling lyrics along with a good sophomore release for INO records (Cannons) and the respected singer/song writer has some momentum built for possibly his best project yet, Heaven & Earth is easily one of the finest worship projects of the year."

Reverend Lee Power from AllMusic: "Heaven & Earth cements Wickham reputation as one of contemporary gospel most original voices, and the perfect tonic for those who feel that modern CCM lacks the artistry of its muse."

Kevin Davis from New Release Tuesday: "Heaven & Earth is not only an encouraging album from a lyrical standpoint, but a delight to listen to with guitar parts that feel like they are literally plucking strings connected to your chest and lonesome yet lush string arrangements, recorded at famed Abbey Road Studios."

"This is definitely Phil Wickham’s best overall album and one of my top 10 albums of 2009. These melodies are off the charts and any test audience will have a hard time not giving these songs 5 star ratings. This is a 5 star album.” - Christian Music Review

== Commercial performance ==
Heaven & Earth debuted on No. 4 on Billboard's Hot Christian Albums chart and No. 55 on Billboard 200 after selling nearly 14,000 copies, with more than 40 percent of album sales in digital, the album also debuted at No. 24 on Billboard Digital Albums.

== Track listing ==
All songs were written and co-written by Phil Wickham, and produced by his long-time producer Peter Kipley. The expanded edition of Heaven & Earth included four new tracks, the new single "In My Love", "Great In My Life", a remix version of "Eden", and "One Who Overcomes" which was originally included in the 2009 compilation album, Catalyst Music Project.

Heaven & Earth

No.	Title	Writer(s)	Producer(s)	Length
1.	"Eden"	Phil Wickham	Peter Kipley	3:16
2.	"Coming Alive"	Phil Wickham	Peter Kipley	3:44
3.	"Heaven & Earth"	Phil Wickham, Phil Danyew	Peter Kipley	3:49
4.	"The Time Is Now"	Phil Wickham, Peter Kipley	Peter Kipley	4:33
5.	"Hold On"	Phil Wickham	Peter Kipley	3:33
6.	"Safe" (featuring Bart Millard)	Phil Wickham	Peter Kipley	3:41
7.	"I'll Always Love You"	Phil Wickham, Tyler Chester	Peter Kipley	3:47
8.	"In Your City"	Phil Wickham	Peter Kipley	4:16
9.	"Your Arrival"	Phil Wickham, Phil Danyew	Peter Kipley	3:44
10.	"Because of Your Love"	Phil Wickham	Peter Kipley	4:33
11.	"Cielo"	Phil Wickham	Peter Kipley	5:03
12.	"Heaven Song"	Phil Wickham	Peter Kipley	4:05
Total length:				47:54

Expanded edition
No.	Title	Writer(s)	Producer(s)	Length
13.	"In My Love" (iTunes Bonus Track)	Phil Wickham	Peter Kipley	3:35
14.	"Eden (remix)" (iTunes Bonus Track)	Phil Wickham	Peter Kipley	3:44
15.	"Great In My Life" (iTunes Bonus Track)	Phil Wickham	Peter Kipley	4:10
16.	"One Who Overcomes"	Nic Carver	Peter Kipley	4:22
Total length:				52:45

== Personnel ==
Adapted from album notes.

- Phil Wickham – vocals, acoustic piano, guitars
- Evan Wickham – guitars, banjo (4), piano (12)
- Taylor Johnson – guitars (3, 11)
- Pete Kipley – bass
- Brandon Lozano – drums (1–5, 9–12)
- Daniel Bailey – drums (6, 8)
- Joel Plotnik – drums (7)
- London Symphony Orchestra – strings
- Bart Millard – vocals (6)

=== Production ===
- Pete Kipley – producer, recording, mixing
- Peter Corbin – recording
- Steve Churchyard – drum recording
- David Larring – mixing
- Alex Curth – assistant engineer, digital editing
- Chris Athens – mastering at Sterling Sound (New York City, New York)
- Christian Rios – photography, art direction
- Noah Gonzales – design, layout
- BrickHouse Entertainment – management

== Charts ==
Chart (2009–2010)	Peak position
U.S. Billboard 200	55
U.S. Digital Albums	24
U.S. Christian Albums	4
