= Hymn of Heaven (song) =

2021 song by Phil Wickham

Single by Phil Wickham

from the album Hymn of Heaven
- Released: February 11, 2022
- Genre: Contemporary worship music
- Length: 4:05
- Label: Fair Trade Services
- Songwriters: Phil Wickham; Brian Johnson; Bill Johnson; Chris Davenport
- Producer: Jonathan Smith

Phil Wickham singles chronology
"House of the Lord" (2021)	"Hymn of Heaven" (2022)	"Worthy of My Song (Worthy of It All)" (2022)

Music videos
- "Hymn of Heaven" on YouTube
- "Hymn of Heaven" (Lyrics) on YouTube
- "Hymn of Heaven" (Song Session) on YouTube

"Hymn of Heaven" is a song by American contemporary Christian musician Phil Wickham. The song was released on February 11, 2022, as the third single from Wickham's eighth studio album, Hymn of Heaven (2021). Wickham co-wrote the song with Bill Johnson, Brian Johnson, and Chris Davenport. Jonathan Smith produced the single.

"Hymn of Heaven" peaked at number two on the US Hot Christian Songs chart. The song won the GMA Dove Award for Worship Recorded Song of the Year at the 2022 GMA Dove Awards. The song also received a nomination for the Grammy Award for Best Contemporary Christian Music Performance/Song at the 2023 Grammy Awards.

== Background ==
Phil Wickham shared the story behind the song, saying: "The song is all about bringing heaven to this moment, with the way we act, and the way we speak, and the way we live, letting Jesus be the king and his rule, and his way taking over."

On February 11, 2021, Wickham also released the radio version of the song. The radio team of Fair Trade Services announced that "Hymn of Heaven" will be serviced to Christian radio in the United States, the official add date for the single slated on March 25, 2022.

== Composition ==
"Hymn of Heaven" is composed in the key of E with a tempo of 71 beats per minute and a musical time signature of 4/4.

== Reception ==
=== Critical response ===
Jonathan Andre, reviewing for 365 Days of Inspiring Media review, saying "Hymn of Heaven" was one of the songs from Hymn of Heaven which "the potential to be powerful songs sung in churches around the world." Kevin Davis of NewReleaseToday also shared a similar sentiment, saying it was one of the songs on the albums that worship leaders would want to add to their set-lists immediately. Timothy Yap of JubileeCast commented on the song in his review: "it has a strong hymnic structure with well-crafted words that speak of the day we will meet Christ face to face." Jesus Freak Hideout's Josh Balogh opined in his review: "The title track, "Hymn of Heaven," is anthemic, with a big assist from a chorus of backing voices pushing the song ever higher."

=== Accolades ===
Awards
Year	Organization	Award	Result	Ref
2022	GMA Dove Awards	Worship Recorded Song of the Year	Won	
2023	Grammy Awards	Best Contemporary Christian Music Performance/Song	Nominated	

Year-end lists
Publication	Accolade	Rank	Ref.
JubileeCast	Top 10 Worship Songs of 2021	1	

== Commercial performance ==
"Hymn of Heaven" debuted at number 25 on the US Hot Christian Songs chart dated July 10, 2021, concurrently charting at number six on the Christian Digital Song Sales chart. The song

"Hymn of Heaven" made its debut at number 43 on the US Christian Airplay chart dated April 2, 2022.

"Hymn of Heaven" made its debut at number 26 on the US Christian AC chart dated April 23, 2022.

== Music videos ==
The official music video as well as the lyric video and audio video of "Hymn of Heaven" were all published on Phil Wickham's YouTube channel on June 25, 2021. On January 17, 2022, Essential Worship released the Song Session video of the song performed by Wickham through YouTube.

== Charts ==
=== Weekly charts ===
Weekly chart performance for "Hymn of Heaven"
Chart (2021–2022)	Peak position
US Hot Christian Songs (Billboard)	2
US Christian Airplay (Billboard)	4
US Christian AC (Billboard)	1

=== Year-end charts ===
Year-end chart performance for "Hymn of Heaven"
Chart (2022)	Position
US Christian Songs (Billboard)	7
US Christian Airplay (Billboard)	16
US Christian AC (Billboard)	10

== Certifications ==
Region	Certification	Certified units/sales
United States (RIAA)	Gold	500,000^{‡}
^{‡} Sales+streaming figures based on certification alone.

== Release history ==
Release history and formats for "Hymn of Heaven"
Region	Date	Format	Label	Ref.
Various	February 11, 2022	Digital download; streaming	Fair Trade Services	
United States	March 25, 2022	Christian radio	Fair Trade Services	

== Other versions ==
- Bethel Music released a duet cover of the song, led by Brian Johnson and Zahriya Zachary, on their collective album, Homecoming (2021).
