= List of Official Christian & Gospel Albums Chart number ones from the 2020s =

The Official Christian & Gospel Albums Chart is a music chart based on sales of albums of Contemporary Christian and gospel music in the UK. It is compiled weekly by the Official Charts Company (OCC), with each week's number one being announced on Mondays on their official website. The chart was launched on 11 March 2013 in partnership with Christian child development charity Compassion UK – the album at number one on the first chart was Zion by Hillsong United. The band's record label, Hillsong Music UK, remarked that they were "thrilled to be part of the launch of the first Official Christian & Gospel Albums Chart in the UK". The event launching the chart was hosted by David Grant, and featured Martin Smith of Delirious? and the London Community Gospel Choir. The previous year, 600 new Christian music albums had been released in the UK.

== Number ones ==
Key
No.	nth album to top the Official Christian & Gospel Albums Chart
re	Return of an album to number one

No.	Artist (Note: The artist, song, date of reaching number one and number of weeks at number one are those given by the OCC.)	Album	Record label (Note: The record labels are those given by the OCC.)	Reached number one (for the week ending)	Weeks at number one (Total weeks at number one)
2020
re	NF	The Search	NF Real Music	19 December 2019	16 (29)
91	Rend Collective	Choose to Worship	CCMG	9 April 2020	1
re	NF	The Search	NF Real Music	16 April 2020	5 (34)
re	Kanye West	Jesus Is King	Def Jam	21 May 2020	1 (7)
re	NF	The Search	NF Real Music	28 May 2020	27 (61)
92	Andrea Bocelli	Believe	Decca	26 November 2020	10
2021
re	NF	The Search	NF Real Music	4 February 2021	9 (70)
93	NF	Clouds	NF Real Music	8 April 2021	9
re	NF	The Search	NF Real Music	10 June 2021	13 (83)
94	Kanye West	Donda	Def Jam	9 September 2021	73
2023
re	NF	The Search	NF Real Music	2 February 2023	1 (84)
re	Kanye West	Donda	Def Jam	9 February 2023	2 (75)
re	NF	The Search	NF Real Music	23 February 2023	8 (92)
95	NF	Hope	NF Real Music	20 April 2023	31
re	Kanye West	Donda	Def Jam	23 November 2023	3 (78)
re	NF	Hope	NF Real Music	14 December 2023	1
re	Kanye West	Donda	Def Jam	21 December 2023	24 (102)
2024
96	Poor Clares of Arundel	My Peace I Give You	Decca	6 June 2024	1
re	Kanye West	Donda	Def Jam	13 June 2024	2 (104)
re	NF	The Search	NF Real Music	27 June 2024	1 (93)
re	Kanye West	Donda	Def Jam	4 July 2024	2 (106)
re	NF	The Search	NF Real Music	18 July 2024	2 (95)
re	Kanye West	Donda	Def Jam	1 August 2024	6 (112)
97	David Kushner	The Dichotomy	Virgin	12 September 2024	4
re	Kanye West	Donda	Def Jam	17 October 2024	5 (117)
98	Skillet	Revolution	Hear It Loud	14 November 2024	1
re	Kanye West	Donda	Def Jam	21 November 2024	16 (133)
2025
re	NF	The Search	NF Real Music	20 March 2025	1 (96)
re	David Kushner	The Dichotomy	Virgin	27 March 2025	1
re	NF	The Search	NF Real Music	3 April 2025	2 (98)
re	Kanye West	Donda	Def Jam	17 April 2025	10 (143)
re	NF	The Search	NF Real Music	19 June 2025	1 (99)
99	Brandon Lake	King of Hearts	Provident Label Group	26 June 2025	1
re	NF	The Search	NF Real Music	3 July 2025	21 (120)
100	NF	Fear	NF Real Music	27 November 2025	17
2026
re	NF	The Search	NF Real Music	26 March 2026	2 (122)
re	Kanye West	Donda	Def Jam	9 April 2026	5 (148)
re	NF	The Search	NF Real Music	14 May 2026	5 (127)
101	The Red Clay Strays	Grateful	RCA	18 June 2026	1
re	NF	The Search	NF Real Music	25 June 2026	12 (138)
re	Kanye West	Donda	Def Jam	17 September 2026	1 (149)
re	NF	The Search	NF Real Music	24 September 2026	8 (145)

== Broadcast ==
The chart is aired on Christian radio stations Premier Christian Radio on Tuesday afternoons at 5 pm, and on UCB UK on Thursday evenings at 10 pm and Sunday evenings at 6 pm.

== See also ==
- List of number-one Billboard Christian Albums
