= Pete Kipley =

- Born: Peter Charles Kipley; May 1970 (age 55)
- Origin: Nashville, Tennessee
- Genres: Christian
- Occupations: Record producer, composer, songwriter
- Years active: 1997–present
- Label: Simple
- Website: petekipley.com

Peter Charles Kipley (born May 1970) is an American Christian musician, record producer and songwriter. He has been awarded four GMA Dove Awards. He started Simple Records, with Bart Millard of MercyMe, where they signed as their first act, The Afters. He was awarded the SESAC's Christian Songwriter of the Year, in 2004. He is also known for his longtime partnership with worship artist Phil Wickham, with whom he produced several records between 2006 and 2019.
