= Phil Wickham =

American Christian musician (born 1984)

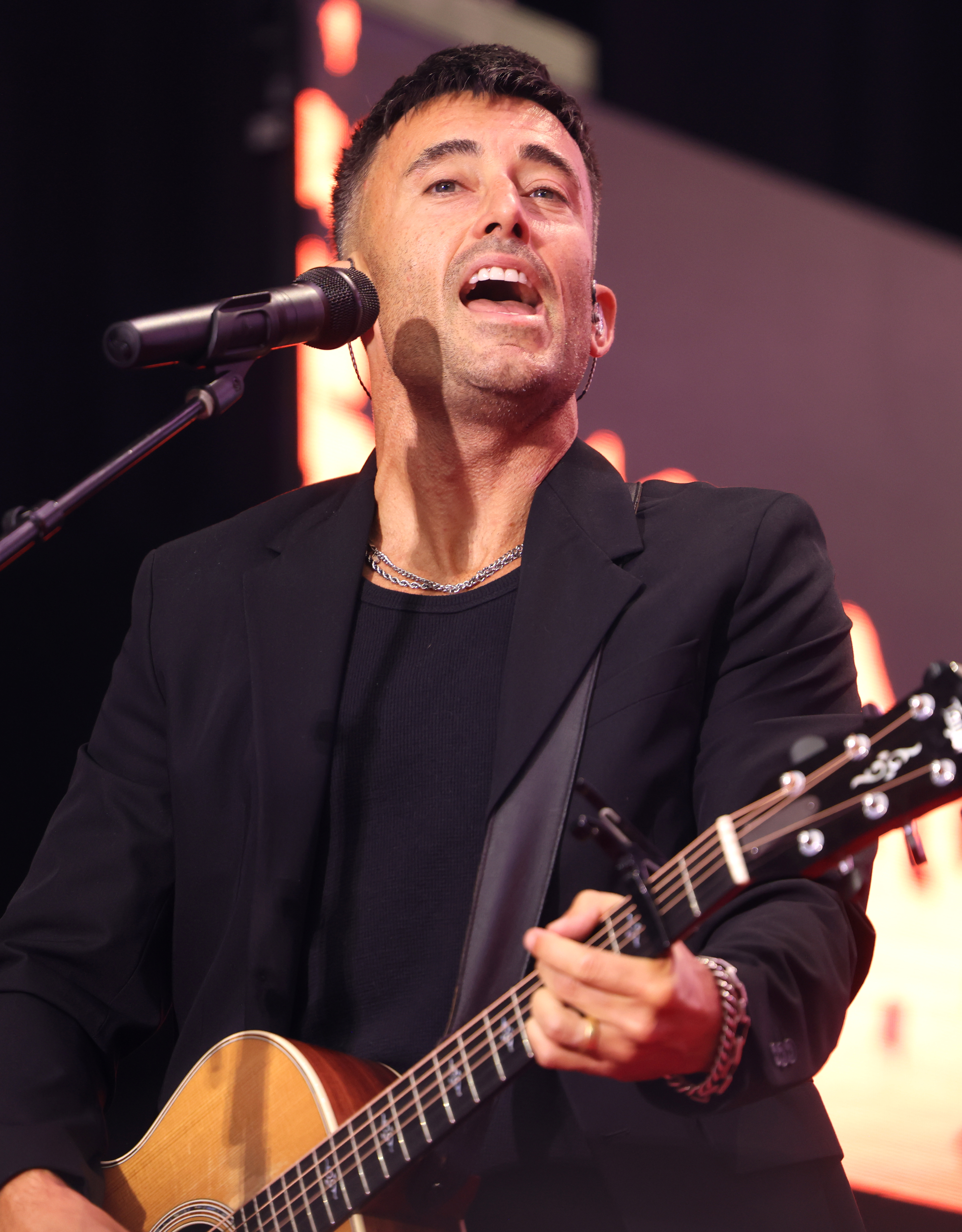
- Wickham in 2025

Background information
- Born: Philip David Wickham; April 5, 1984 (age 42)
- Origin: San Diego, California, U.S.
- Genres: CCM; CWM
- Occupations: Singer; songwriter; worship leader
- Instruments: Vocals; guitar; piano
- Years active: 2002–present
- Labels: Simple; INO
- Spouse: Mallory Plotnik (m. 2008)
- Website: philwickham.com

Philip David Wickham (born April 5, 1984) is an American contemporary Christian singer-songwriter and musician from San Diego, California. He has released fourteen worship albums: Give You My World in 2003, a self-titled album in 2006, Cannons in 2007, Singalong in 2008, Heaven & Earth in 2009, Response in 2011, Singalong 2 in 2012, The Ascension in 2013, Singalong 3 in 2015, Children of God in 2016, Living Hope in 2018, Hymn of Heaven in 2021, I Believe in 2023, and Song of the Saints in 2025. He has also led worship at Soul Survivor. His single "This is Amazing Grace" has been certified Platinum by the RIAA and it topped the 2014 year-end Christian Airplay chart.

== Early life and education ==
Born Philip David Wickham on April 5, 1984, Phil Wickham was raised in a Christian home, the second of three children—with brother Evan and sister Jillian—of parents John and Lisa (née Irwin) Wickham. The context for Phil Wickham's early musical and religious pursuits was his parents' commitments; Wickham's father John played in early bands for the early Maranatha! Music label, and met Evan's mother, Lisa, in the band Parable; consistently since 1981, they served as worship leaders in their congregation. Phil Wickham began leading worship for his youth group at Maranatha Chapel at 13 years old; his parents encouraged him to learn popular praise songs and to write his own.

In 2002, he graduated from Calvary Christian School in Vista, California.

== Career ==
=== Albums ===
Wickham began a full-time music career by touring California and recording his first album, Give You My World, in 2003. After that release Wickham signed with Simple Records. Wickham released his self-titled label debut in 2006. Wickham's second release with Simple/INO Records, Cannons, was released in 2007. Cannons was partly inspired by cannon explosions and C. S. Lewis' book, The Voyage of the Dawn Treader from The Chronicles of Narnia series. Wickham stated in an interview with ChristianityToday.com, "The album is about how the universe is exploding with the glory of God, and we are compelled to join in with its song." The 10th track from Cannons, "Jesus Lord of Heaven", has been translated into seven different languages. On August 8, 2008, Wickham released a live worship album, Singalong, recorded at Solid Rock Church in Portland, Oregon with 3,000 in attendance. The album was released as a free download, only available from his website, and received over 8,000 downloads within a week of being released. After the release of Singalong, his self-titled album hit No. 25 on iTunes Store Top Christian Albums sales, two years after its initial release.

Heaven & Earth, Wickham's third studio album, was released on November 17, 2009. His Christmas album Songs for Christmas was released as a digital download available on his website on October 29, 2010. Wickham's fourth full-length studio album, Response, was released on October 4, 2011. On October 30, 2012, Phil Wickham released his second live acoustic album, Singalong 2. The Ascension, Wickham's fifth studio album, was released on September 24, 2013. The album peaked at No. 39 on the Billboard 200, making it Wickham's highest charting album on the chart. The lead single off of this album, "This is Amazing Grace", became No. 1 on the 2014 year-end Christian Airplay Songs chart.

In February 2016, Wickham released the first single, "Your Love Awakens Me", from his album, Children of God, which was released later that year. Living Hope, Wickham's seventh full-length studio project, was released in August 2018. The album debuted at No. 1 on the Billboard Christian Albums chart, his first album to do so. On October 4, 2019, Wickham's 10-track holiday album Christmas was released along with the music video for "Joy to the World (Joyful, Joyful)". Wickham toured both Texas and California with Shane & Shane that same December on their annual Christmas tour. Christmas would go on to spend 12 weeks on the Billboard Christian Albums chart, peaking at No. 24.

In June 2021, Wickham's eighth studio album Hymn of Heaven was released. Featuring a guest appearance by Brandon Lake, its releases included "Battle Belongs" (No. 2 on the Hot Christian Songs chart), "House of the Lord" (No. 1) and "Hymn of Heaven" (No. 2), along with It's Always Been You released as a promotional single. Debuting at No. 1 on Billboard's Top Christian Albums Chart in the United States, it also entered at No. 6 on the Official Charts' Official Christian & Gospel Albums Chart in the United Kingdom. At the 2021 GMA Dove Awards, "Battle Belongs" was nominated for the GMA Dove Award for Worship Recorded Song of the Year. The album was nominated for the Billboard Music Award for Top Christian Album at the 2022 Billboard Music Awards. At the 2022 GMA Dove Awards, Hymn of Heaven won the GMA Dove Award for Worship Album of the Year, the title track won the GMA Dove Award for Worship Recorded Song of the Year, and "House of the Lord" was nominated for two GMA Dove Awards: Song of the Year and Pop/Contemporary Song of the Year.

In 2023, Wickham released his next studio album I Believe which was nominated for a Grammy Award for Contemporary Christian Music Album. His next album, Song of the Saints was released in 2025. Song of the Saints debuted at number 2 On the Top Christian Albums Chart. Wickham released a new version of Rich Mullins' 1988 song "Awesome God" in April 2025 titled "What an Awesome God". The single became a success and became his first Billboard Hot 100 entry and topped Billboard's Christian Airplay and AC Airplay charts.

=== Tours ===
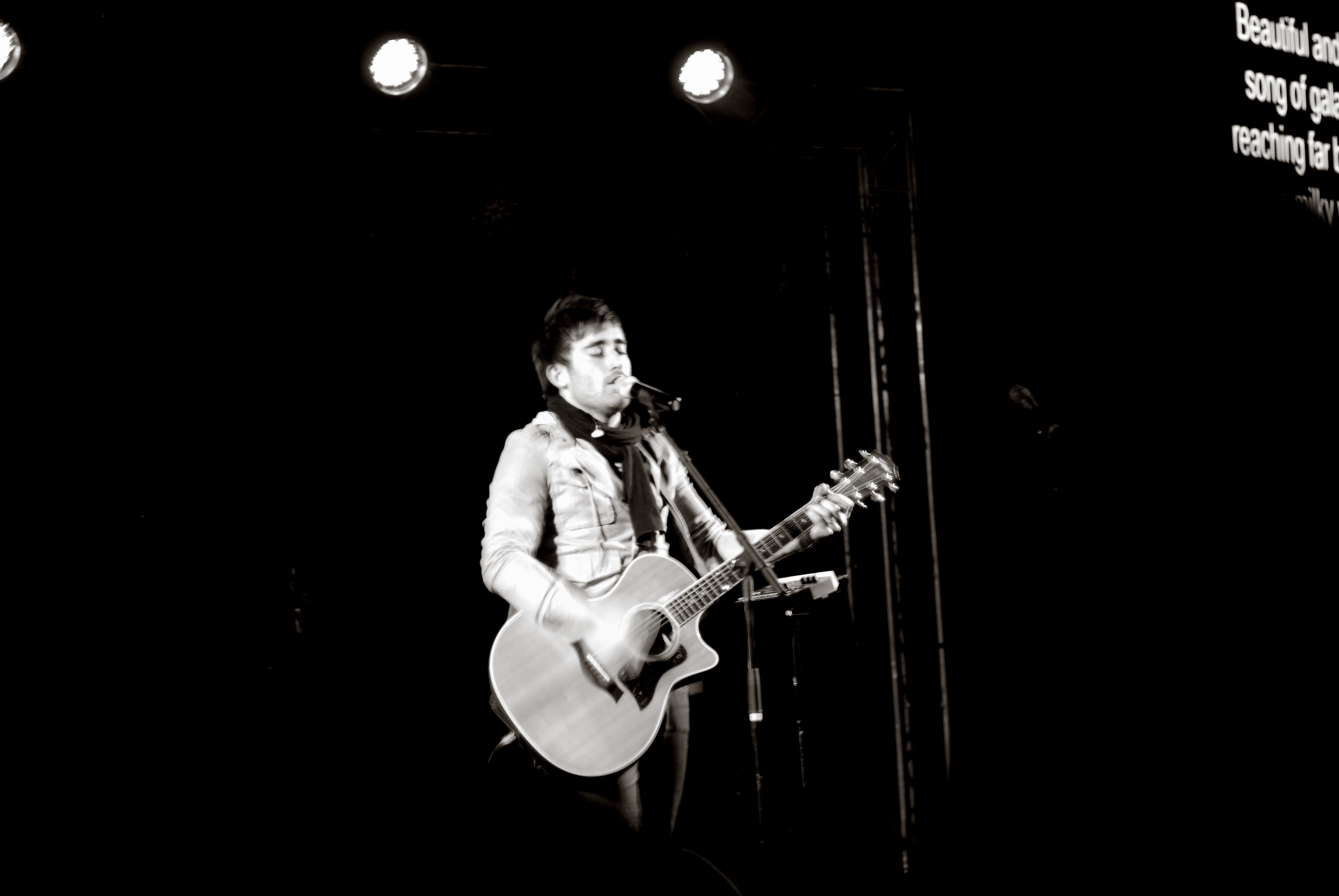
Wickham performing in 2008

Wickham visits churches around the world to play his music. From late 2006 to early 2007, he went on the "Coming Up to Breathe" tour with MercyMe and Audio Adrenaline. In late 2007, he went on the Remedy tour with the David Crowder Band and The Myriad. In the summers of 2023, 2024, and 2025, Wickham embarked on the Summer Worship Nights Tour with Brandon Lake.

=== Festival and other activities ===
Wickham has played Christian worship festivals, e.g., Creation Fest in 2008. In the mid-2010s, Wickham was one of the worship leaders for Soul Survivor week and Momentum Festival in the UK. Since 2012, he has performed at the Big Church Festival in the UK.

On September 21, 2025, Wickham led worship at the memorial service of Charlie Kirk held at State Farm Stadium in Phoenix, Arizona. The assassination of Charlie Kirk occurred in Utah on September 10, 2025.

Wickham voiced King David in the animated biblical film David, which was released in theaters on December 19, 2025 by Angel Studios.

== Personal life ==
Wickham married Mallory Plotnik in 2008; as of December 2023, the couple was living in San Diego, California, with their four children. Wickham attends Light Church, a small chapel based in Encinitas, California.

Wickham underwent surgery to remove a polyp from folds of his vocal cords on April 28, 2014, after which he was prescribed a month of silence to allow the surgical site to heal. He was uncertain that he would be able to sing again, leading to identity issues and self-doubt; spiritual insights from this period formed the basis for his 2016 album, Children of God.

== Discography ==
- Give You My World (2003)
- Phil Wickham (2006)
- Cannons (2007)
- Heaven & Earth (2009)
- Songs for Christmas (2010)
- Response (2011)
- The Ascension (2013)
- Children of God (2016)
- Living Hope (2018)
- Christmas (2019)
- Hymn of Heaven (2021)
- I Believe (2023)
- Hallelujah! It's Christmas! (2024)
- Song of the Saints (2025)
- Hallelujah! It's Christmas Again! (2026)

== Filmography ==
Year	Title	Role	Notes	Ref
2005	Favouritism	Self	TV series	
2005	Michael Portillo's Great British Losers	Self		
2007	The Wager	Soundtrack (Grace)		
2013	On the Spot Interviews	Self	TV series	
2013	This is Amazing Grace	Self	Video short	
2014	Believe Me	Soundtrack (You're Beautiful)	You're Beautiful	
2016	Worship Night in America	Self	Documentary	
2019	Breakthrough	Worship Leader	This Is Amazing Grace (Breakthrough Mix)	
2019	50th Annual GMA Dove Awards	Performer	TV Special	
2020	Christmas with the Chosen	Self	TV Special	
2021	Christmas with the Chosen: The Messengers	Self		
2024	For The One - A Tour Documentary	Self	Documentary about Summer Worship Nights Tour	
2025	David	King David	Voice	

== Awards and nominations ==
=== American Music Awards ===
Year	Nominee / work	Award	Result
2022	Phil Wickham	Favorite Inspirational Artist	Nominated

=== Billboard Music Awards ===
Year	Nominee / work	Award	Result
2022	Hymn of Heaven	Top Christian Album	Nominated

=== GMA Dove Awards ===
Year	Nominee	Award	Result	ref
2015	"This Is Amazing Grace"	Song of the Year	Nominated	
2015	"This Is Amazing Grace"	Worship Song of the Year	Nominated	
2015	Himself	Songwriter of the Year (Artist)	Nominated	
2019	"Living Hope"	Song of the Year	Nominated	
2019	"Living Hope"	Worship Song of the Year	Nominated	
2019	"Living Hope"	Worship Recorded Song of the Year	Won	
2019	Living Hope	Worship Album of the Year	Nominated	
2021	Himself	Artist of the Year	Nominated	
2021	"Battle Belongs"	Worship Recorded Song of the Year	Nominated	
2021	Christmas: Acoustic Sessions	Christmas / Special Event Album of the Year	Nominated	
2022	"House of the Lord"	Song of the Year	Nominated	
2022	"House of the Lord"	Pop/Contemporary Recorded Song of the Year	Nominated	
2022	Himself	Songwriter of the Year - Artist	Won	
2022	"I've Got Joy" (Note: Wickham is credited as a co-writer of "I've Got Joy" performed by CeCe Winans.) (CeCe Winans)	Inspirational Recorded Song of the Year	Nominated	
2022	"Hymn of Heaven"	Worship Recorded Song of the Year	Won	
2022	Hymn of Heaven	Worship Album of the Year	Won	
2023	"Then Christ Came" (Note: Wickham is credited as a co-writer of "Then Christ Came" performed by MercyMe.) (MercyMe)	Song of the Year	Nominated	
2023	Himself	Songwriter of the Year - Artist	Nominated	
2023	Himself	Artist of the Year	Nominated	
2023	"Holy Forever" (Note: Wickham is credited as a co-writer of "Holy Forever" performed by Chris Tomlin.) (Chris Tomlin)	Worship Recorded Song of the Year	Nominated	
2023	"This Is Our God"	Worship Recorded Song of the Year	Nominated	
2024	I Believe	Worship Recorded Album of the Year	Won	
2024	"Holy Forever"	Song of the Year with writers Chris Tomlin, Brian Johnson, Jenn Johnson, Jason Ingram	Won	
2025	"The Jesus Way"	Inspirational Recorded Song of the Year	Won	
2025	Himself	Artist of the Year	Nominated	
2025	"The King Is In The Room"	Worship Recorded Song of the Year	Nominated	
2025	Hallelujah! It’s Christmas!	Christmas/Special Event Album of the Year	Won	
2026	"Homesick for Heaven"	Song of the Year	Nominated	
2026	"What an Awesome God"	Song of the Year	Nominated	
2026	Songwriter of the Year	Himself	Nominated	
2026	Artist of the Year	Himself	Won	
2026	"Homesick for Heaven"	Pop/Contemporary Recorded Song of the Year	Nominated	
2026	"Psalm 8"	Inspirational Recorded Song of the Year	Nominated	
2026	"What an Awesome God"	Worship Recorded Song of the Year	Nominated	
2026	"Follow the Light"	Children's Recorded Song of the Year	Won	
2026	Song of the Saints	Worship Album of the Year	Won	

=== Grammy Awards ===
Year	Nominee	Award	Result	Ref
2023	"Hymn of Heaven (Radio Version)"	Best Contemporary Christian Music Performance/Song	Nominated	
2023	"Holy Forever" (Note: Wickham is credited as a co-writer of "Holy Forever" performed by Chris Tomlin.) (Chris Tomlin)	Best Contemporary Christian Music Performance/Song	Nominated	
2024	I Believe	Grammy Award for Contemporary Christian Music Album	Nominated	

=== K-Love Fan Awards ===
Year	Nominee / work	Award	Result	Ref.
2026	"What an Awesome God"	Song of the Year	Nominated	
2026	"Homesick for Heaven"	Worship Song of the Year	Won	
2026	Himself	Artist of the Year	Nominated	
2026	Himself	Male Artist of the Year	Nominated	

=== We Love Awards ===
Year	Nominee / work	Award	Result	Ref.
2025	"What an Awesome God"	Worship Song of the Year	Nominated	

== Published works ==
- Wickham, Phil. "On Our Knees".
- Wickham, Phil. "On Our Knees: Prayer Journal".
- Wickham, Phil. "I Believe Devotional".
- Wickham, Phil. "Everyday Hallelujah".
