= Fair Trade Services =

American record label

- Founded: 1999
- Founder: Jeff Moseley
- Distributor: Sony Music
- Genre: Contemporary Christian music
- Country of origin: United States
- Location: Brentwood, Tennessee
- Official website: fairtradeservices.com

Fair Trade Services, formerly known as INO Records, is an American record label based in Brentwood, Tennessee, specializing in Contemporary Christian music (CCM).

== History ==
The label was founded in 1999 as INO Records, a division of M2 Communications. Integrity Media acquired the label in 2002. When Integrity Media was sold to David C. Cook in 2011, label founder and president Jeff Moseley purchased the label assets and renamed it Fair Trade Services.

It was the parent label of SRE Recordings, which concentrated more on Christian rock releases until that label closed with the sale of INO Records to founder Jeff Moseley. All remaining SRE recording artists are under the banner of Fair Trade Services.

== Mission ==
Regarding their mission, the company states: "We desire to work with artists who have a unique message, excellent artistry and spiritual maturity while serving them well through partnering. Our chief aim is to know God and make Him known through products that are spiritually significant, artistically excellent and culturally relevant."

== Roster ==
- Austin French
- Caleb & John
- CeCe Winans
- Christian Hohn
- Colton Dixon (Atlantic Records)
- Emerson Day
- Erik Nieder
- Hope Darst
- Jordan Janzen
- Laura Story
- LEDGER (Atlantic Records)
- Luke Bower
- Megan Woods
- MercyMe
- Micah Tyler
- Phil Wickham
- Poets & Prophets
- Ryan Kennedy
- Sam Wesley
- Sara Groves
- Skillet (Formerly Atlantic Records), Independent
- The Afters

== Fair Trade Gospel ==
- Anthony Brown
- CeCe Winans
- Charles Butler
- Jason Nelson
- Maranda Curtis
- Geoffrey Golden
- Vashawn Mitchell
- L. Spenser Smith
- Rich Tolbert Jr.

== Former ==
- 4Him (disbanded)
- 33Miles
- Audio Adrenaline (disbanded)
- Addison Road (disbanded)
- Todd Agnew (Ardent/Fair Trade)
- Ashes Remain
- Beautiful Eulogy (Humble Beast/Fair Trade)
- Blindside
- Building 429
- Caedmon's Call
- Catalyst Music Project
- Chasen
- Citizen Way
- Connersvine (active, unsigned)
- Decyfer Down
- Jonny Diaz (active, with Centricity)
- The Digital Age
- Disciple
- Echoing Angels (active, with Patton House)
- Anthony Evans
- Mike Farris
- Fee
- Flyleaf (active, with Loud & Proud)
- The Fray (Epic/Fair Trade)
- Gateway Worship
- Mark Harris (now part of Gateway Worship)
- Micah Stampley
- Hawk Nelson
- Jack Cassidy
- Jackie Hill Perry (Humble Beast/Fair Trade)
- Jasmine Murray
- Jeremy Horn (Ardent/Fair Trade)
- Jonas Brothers (active, with Hollywood)
- Nick Jonas (part of The Jonas Brothers and Nick Jonas and the Administration)
- Sandi Patty
- P.O.D. (active, signed with Mascot Records)
- Chris Rice
- Rock n Roll Worship Circus (disbanded)
- Shane & Shane
- Mark Schultz
- Mike Donehey
- Phillips, Craig and Dean (Columbia/Fair Trade)
- Propaganda (Humble Beast/Fair Trade)
- Jenny Simmons
- SONICFLOOd (active, unsigned)
- Terry MacAlmon
- Stellar Kart
- Sanctus Real
- Ten Shekel Shirt (active, with Rounder)
- John Tibbs
- Derek Webb
- Joy Whitlock
- Heather Williams
- Kara Williamson (active, as Kara Tualatai part of Prelude trio on Trackstar Recordworks)
- Veritas
- VOTA
- Darlene Zschech
- Zauntee

== See also ==
- List of record labels
