= Pat Barrett discography =

- Studio albums: 3
- EPs: 6
- Live albums: 1
- Singles: 14

American Christian worship musician Pat Barrett has released three studio albums, one live album, six extended play, and fourteen singles (including one promotional single).

== Studio albums ==
List of studio albums, with selected chart positions
Title	Album details	Peak chart positions		
Title	Album details	US Heat.	US Christ	UK C&G
Pat Barrett	Released: July 20, 2018; Label: Bowyer & Bow, Sparrow, Capitol CMG; Format: Digital download, streaming	11	22	11
Act Justly, Love Mercy, Walk Humbly	Released: February 26, 2021; Label: Bowyer & Bow, Capitol CMG; Format: Digital download, streaming	—	30	—
Shelter	Released: October 13, 2023; Label: Bowyer & Bow, Capitol CMG; Format: Digital download, streaming	—	—	—
I've Got a Fire	Released: October 3, 2025; Label: Bowyer & Bow, Capitol CMG; Format: Digital download, streaming	—	—	—
"—" denotes a recording that did not chart

== Live albums ==
List of live albums
Title	Album details
Canvas and Clay	Released: August 23, 2019; Label: Bowyer & Bow, Sparrow, Capitol CMG; Format: Digital download, streaming
Break Open	Released: March 13, 2026; Label: Bowyer & Bow, Capitol CMG; Format: Digital download, streaming

== EPs ==
List of extended plays
Title	Album details
Pat Barrett	Released: March 30, 2018; Label: Bowyer & Bow, Sparrow, Capitol CMG; Format: Digital download, streaming
Construiré Mi Vida	First Spanish-language release; Released: September 3, 2021; Label: Bowyer & Bow, Sparrow, Capitol CMG; Format: Digital download, streaming
Open Eyes	Released: September 10, 2021; Label: UMG Recordings; Format: Digital download, streaming
Open Heart	Released: October 8, 2021; Label: UMG Recordings; Format: Digital download, streaming
Open Hands	Released: September 10, 2021; Label: UMG Recordings; Format: Digital download, streaming
Nothing / Something	Released: June 4, 2021; Label: Bowyer & Bow, Sparrow, Capitol CMG; Format: Digital download, streaming
Happily Hidden	Released: July 26, 2024; Label: Bowyer & Bow, Capitol CMG; Format: Digital download, streaming

== Singles ==
=== As lead artist ===
List of singles and peak chart positions
Title	Year	Chart positions			Album
Title	Year	US Christ	US Christ Air.	US Christ AC	Album
"Good Good Father" (with Chris Tomlin)	2018	—	—	—	Non-album single
"The Way (New Horizon)"	2018	12	5	7	Pat Barrett
"Sails" (featuring Steffany Gretzinger and Amanda Cook)	2018	—	—	—	Pat Barrett
"Build My Life"	2018	4	1	1	Pat Barrett
"Better"	2019	16	14	18	Pat Barrett
"Canvas and Clay"	2020	38	30	—	Act Justly, Love Mercy, Walk Humbly
"No Weapon"	2020	—	—	—	Act Justly, Love Mercy, Walk Humbly
"Lightning" (with Harolddd)	2020	—	—	—	Act Justly, Love Mercy, Walk Humbly
"Heavenly"	2020	—	—	—	Act Justly, Love Mercy, Walk Humbly
"Act Justly, Love Mercy, Walk Humbly"	2021	47	32	27	Act Justly, Love Mercy, Walk Humbly
"The Best Is Yet to Come" (with Mack Brock)	2022	—	—	—	Non-album single
"Morning By Morning (I Will Trust)"	2022	42	26	—	Act Justly, Love Mercy, Walk Humbly
"Better Hands"	2023	—	—	—	Non-album single
"Beautiful Life" (featuring CAIN)	2024	—	—	—	Non-album single
"Daily Bread" (featuring Kari Jobe)	2024	—	—	—	Happily Hidden (EP)
"Praise the Lord Forever"	2025	46	39	—	I've Got a Fire
"I've Got a Fire"	2025	—	16	12	I've Got a Fire
"Break Open"	2026	—	—	—	Break Open
"Lost"	2026	—	—	—	Non-album single
"—" denotes a recording that did not chart

=== As featured artist ===
List of featured singles
Title	Year	Album
"10,000 Reasons (Bless the Lord) [10th Anniversary]" (Worship Together featuring Pat Barrett, Bryan & Katie Torwalt, Naomi Raine, Crowder and Matt Redman)	2022	Non-album single

== Promotional singles ==
List of promotional singles and peak chart positions
Title	Year	Chart positions	Album
Title	Year	US Christ	Album
"This Is the Kingdom" (Elevation Worship featuring Pat Barrett)	2022	27	Lion
"Scatter"	2023	—	Shelter
"Loved" (with Cecily)	2023	—	Happily Hidden (EP)
"Hard Part of a Dream"	2025	—	I've Got a Fire

== Other charted songs ==
List of charted songs and peak chart positions
Title	Year	Chart positions	Album
Title	Year	US Christ	Album
"As For Me" (with Chris Tomlin)	2021	28	Act Justly, Love Mercy, Walk Humbly
"—" denotes a recording that did not chart

== Other appearances ==
Song	Year	Album	Ref.
"Buen Padre" (Passion featuring Pat Barrett)	2017	Glorioso Día	
"How Sweet It Is" (Chris Tomlin featuring Pat Barrett)	2018	Holy Roar	
"Build My Life" (Chris Tomlin featuring Pat Barrett)	2019	Holy Roar: Live From Church	
"Let the Light In" (Housefires featuring Pat Barrett)	2019	Housefires V	
"God Is So Good" (Housefires featuring Pat Barrett)	2019	Housefires V	
"Amazing Grace (My Chains Are Gone)" (Simple Hymns featuring Pat Barrett)	2019	Songs of Redemption	
"Build My Life" (David's Tent featuring Pat Barrett and Kirby Kaple)	2019	Raise Every Voice	
"Come, People of the Risen King" (Simple Hymns featuring Pat Barrett)	2019	Songs of Thanksgiving	
"The Wonderful Cross" (Simple Hymns featuring Pat Barrett)	2020	Songs of Communion	
"All to Us" (Simple Hymns featuring Pat Barrett)	2020	Songs of Faith	
"Same Spirit" (Evan Craft featuring Pat Barrett)	2021	Holy Ground	
"Vivo Está En Mí" (Evan Craft featuring Pat Barrett)	2021	Tierra Santa	
"What a Surprise" (Kirby Kaple featuring Pat Barrett)	2021	Let It Be So (EP)	
"Build My Life" (Bethel Music featuring Pat Barrett)	2021	Peace, Vol. II	
"What I See" (Elevation Worship featuring Chris Brown and Pat Barrett)	2022	Lion: Live from the Loft	
"Here Now With You" (Elevation Worship featuring Pat Barrett)	2022	Lion: Live from the Loft	
