= Patrick Barrett (disambiguation) =

Patrick Barrett (died 1415) was an Irish bishop.

Patrick Barrett may also refer to:

- Paddy Barrett (born 1993), Irish footballer
- Pat Barrett (musician) (born 1984), American contemporary worship musician
  - Pat Barrett (album), 2018
- Pat Barrett (wrestler) (1936–2021), Irish wrestler
- Pat Barrett (boxer) (born 1967), British boxer
- Tony Rebel (Patrick George Anthony Barrett, born 1962), Jamaican musician

== See also ==
- John Patrick Barrett (1878–1946), British clergyman
- Pat Barrett discography
