= We Believe (Newsboys song) =

Single by Newsboys

from the album Restart
- Released: 2013
- Recorded: 2012–13
- Genre: CCM, Christian alternative rock, pop rock
- Length: 4:22
- Label: Sparrow
- Songwriters: Richie Fike, Matt Hooper and Travis Ryan
- Producer: Christopher Stevens

Music video
- "We Believe" on YouTube

"We Believe" is a Christian contemporary worship song. The song was written by Richie Fike, Matt Hooper and Travis Ryan and copyrighted by Life Worship (PRS), Travis Ryan Music (ASCAP), Integrity Worship Music (ASCAP), Integrity's Praise! Music (BMI) (administered at CapitolCMGPublishing).

The song was made famous by the Christian rock band Newsboys in 2013 when they included it in their album Restart. The songwriter Travis Ryan included a live version of the song in his own 2015 EP You Hold It All. It was also included in his 2016 live album Until My Voice Is Gone both released on Integrity Music label.

== Context ==
"We Believe" is mainly based on both the Apostles' Creed and the Nicene Creed translating the historic confession of the church's faith into a communal affirmation and helps the Christian church to contextualize its confession of faith in the Triune God (the Christian doctrine of the Trinity): The song asserts a Christian's fundamental beliefs saying "let our faith be more than anthems, greater than the songs we sing". The refrain emphasizes faith and "belief in God the Father, in Jesus Christ, The Holy Spirit, the crucifixion, that Jesus conquered death with His Resurrection, and that Jesus is coming back again".

The songwriter Travis Ryan describes the song as "just foundationally what we believe as a church". Regarding the Newsboys having commercial success with it, Travis Ryan commented: "God took that song on a journey, and He has used Newsboys to carry that song around the world."

== Awards and nominations ==
"We Believe" has been nominated for many awards including "Song of the Year" and "Pop/Contemporary Song of the Year" during the 46th GMA Dove Awards in 2015 and for "Worship Song of the Year" during 47th GMA Dove Awards in 2016. The Newsboys had performed the song live during the 44th GMA Dove Awards on 15 October 2013.

The song also won the KLOVE Fan Award as best song.

== Music video ==
The music video premiered in May 2014, where the band is seen singing at an empty church at night, as leader Michael Tait, the rest of the band, and other people sing the song from their perspective. A live music video was released on January 15, 2014, and shows footage of the band playing at the Ocean Way Studio in Nashville, Tennessee.

== In popular culture ==
The song was first used in the soundtrack of the theatrical movie God's Not Dead.

== Charts ==
=== Decade-end charts ===
Chart (2010s)	Position
US Christian Songs (Billboard)	21

== Certifications ==
Region	Certification	Certified units/sales
United States (RIAA)	Gold	500,000^{‡}
^{‡} Sales+streaming figures based on certification alone.
