= Build My Life =

2018 song by Pat Barrett

Single by Pat Barrett

from the album Pat Barrett
- Released: December 21, 2018
- Genre: Worship
- Length: 4:23
- Label: Bowyer & Bow; Sparrow; Capitol CMG
- Songwriters: Brett Younker; Karl Martin; Kirby Kaple; Matt Redman; Pat Barrett
- Producer: Ed Cash

Pat Barrett singles chronology
"Sails" (2018)	"Build My Life" (2018)	"Better" (2019)

Music video
- "Build My Life" on YouTube

"Build My Life" is a song by American contemporary worship musician Pat Barrett, taken from his self-titled debut album (2018). It was originally released by American contemporary worship band Housefires on their album, Housefires III (2016). The song was written by Barrett, Brett Younker, Karl Martin, Kirby Kaple, and Matt Redman, and was produced by Ed Cash. "Build My Life" was released as the third single from the album on December 21, 2018.

"Build My Life" was met with rave reviews and was picked as one of the best worship songs of 2018. The track peaked at number four on the US Hot Christian Songs chart. It was nominated for the GMA Dove Awards for Worship Song of the Year and Worship Recorded Song of the Year at the 2019 GMA Dove Awards.

== Background and release ==
On March 19, 2018, Pat Barrett was the first artist signed to Bowyer & Bow, a new imprint by Chris Tomlin with Capitol Christian Music Group. Barrett released his self-titled debut extended play on December 21, which contained multiple versions of "Build My Life". The track was promoted to US Christian radio on January 4, 2019, as the second single from his self-titled debut album, following "The Way (New Horizon)" and "Sails".

Barrett shared the inspiration behind the song, saying ""Build My Life" is one of those songs for me personally, that has carried me through so many years of change and uncertainty and if I’ve learned anything from being a father of three kids and Megan and I just celebrating nine years, it's that life rarely behaves with our plans and it's usually in the uncertainty and the not knowing and the trials that reveals what we’ve been standing on and what we put our trust in. Jesus talks about it in Luke Ch 6 and says its like a man who dug a hole and built his house on the rock, when the storm came and the house withstood the storm. This really is a reminder for us that we can build our life on anything, we have the freedom to build our life on whatever we want. And the invitation of Jesus is to build our lives on things that last."

== Composition ==
"Build My Life" is a worship tune with a midtempo, acoustic guitar-led production. In a review by 365 Days of Inspiring Media, Joshua Andre deemed the track a more radio-friendly version than the original. The song is composed in the key of A♭ with a tempo of 72 beats per minute and a musical time signature of 4/4.

== Critical reception ==
Andre called the song an "exquisite, brilliant [...] grandiose worship anthem" and picked it as the best track from the EP and one of Barnett's best works. Tony Cummings of Cross Rhythms hailed "Build My Life" as one of the finest worship songs of 2018, and praised its "instantly singable melody".

=== Accolades ===
Awards
Year	Organization	Award	Result	Ref.
2019	GMA Dove Awards	Worship Song of the Year	Nominated	
2019	GMA Dove Awards	Worship Recorded Song of the Year	Nominated	

== Commercial performance ==
"Build My Life" debuted at number 31 on the US Hot Christian Songs chart dated January 12, 2019. The song peaked at number four on the chart. On Christian Airplay, "Build My Life" marked Barrett's second top ten entry, and has since peaked atop on the chart.

== Music videos ==
Pat Barrett released the official audio video for the song via YouTube on March 30, 2018. Pat Barrett released the live performance video for "Build My Life" featuring Chris Tomlin through YouTube on December 20, 2018. On January 4, 2019, the official lyric video for the song featuring Cory Asbury was availed on YouTube.

== Track listing ==
All tracks were produced by Ed Cash except where stated.

"Build My Life" — EP
No.	Title	Producer(s)	Length
1.	"Build My Life" (Radio Version)		4:23
2.	"Build My Life" (featuring Cory Asbury)		4:23
3.	"Build My Life" (Live)	Nathan Nockels	5:25
4.	"Build My Life"		4:04
Total length:			18:17

== Charts ==
=== Weekly charts ===
Weekly chart performance for "Build My Life"
Chart (2018–2019)	Peak position
US Christian Songs (Billboard)	4
US Christian Airplay (Billboard)	1
US Christian AC (Billboard)	1

=== Year-end charts ===
Year-end chart performance for "Build My Life"
Chart (2019)	Position
US Christian Songs (Billboard)	18
US Christian Airplay (Billboard)	13
US Christian AC (Billboard)	7

== Certifications ==
Region	Certification	Certified units/sales
United States (RIAA)	Gold	500,000^{‡}
^{‡} Sales+streaming figures based on certification alone.

== Release history ==
Release history and formats for "Build My Life"
Region	Date	Format	Label	Ref.
Various	December 21, 2018	Digital download; streaming; (EP)	Bowyer & Bow; Sparrow Records; Capitol Christian Music Group	
United States	January 4, 2019	Christian CHR; Christian AC	Bowyer & Bow; Sparrow Records; Capitol Christian Music Group	

== Cover versions ==
- Passion released a live version of the song featuring Brett Younker on their album, Worthy of Your Name (2017).
- Christy Nockels released her version of "Build My Life" as a single.
- Shane & Shane covered the song for their album, The Worship Initiative Vol. 14 (2017).
- Bright City released an instrumental version of the song on their album, Bright City Presents: Still, Volume 2 (2018).
- Chris Tomlin released a live version of the song featuring Pat Barrett on his album, Holy Roar: Live from Church (2019).
- Noel Robinson covered the song for his album, I Surrender (2019).
- Bethel Music released their rendition of the song featuring Pat Barrett on their album, Peace, Vol. II (2021).
- Tribl released a live cover of the song featuring Joe L Barnes, Ryan Ofei and Jekalyn Carr on their album, Tribl Nights Atlanta (2021).
