= Till I Found You (Phil Wickham song) =

Single by Phil Wickham

from the album Living Hope
- Released: April 27, 2018
- Recorded: 2018
- Genre: Contemporary Christian music; Christian R&B; CEDM
- Length: 4:00
- Label: Fair Trade Services
- Songwriters: Phil Wickham; Travis Ryan
- Producers: Ran Jackson; Ricky Jackson; Nicolas Balachandran

Phil Wickham singles chronology
"Living Hope" (2018)	"Till I Found You" (2018)	"Great Things" (2018)

Music videos
- "Till I Found You" on YouTube
- "Till I Found You" (Lyrics) on YouTube
- "Till I Found You" (House Sessions) on YouTube
- "Till I Found You" (Singalong 4 Live) on YouTube

"Till I Found You" is a song by American contemporary Christian musician Phil Wickham. The song was released on April 27, 2018, as the second single from his seventh studio album, Living Hope (2018). It impacted Christian radio on March 15, 2019. Wickham co-wrote the song with Travis Ryan, and collaborated with Ran Jackson, Ricky Jackson and Nicolas Balachandran in the production of the single. The song peaked at No. 9 on the US Hot Christian Songs chart.

== Background ==
On April 27, 2018, Phil Wickham released "Till I Found You" as the second single from Living Hope, an album which slated for release in August 2018, along with its accompanying lyric video. Wickham shared the story behind the song, saying:

"Till I Found You" was a song that came out of a really specific moment. I was leading worship at this church at lead at regularly called Harvest Christian Fellowship, one Wednesday night. At the end of these services sometimes the pastor Greg Laurie will give an opportunity to respond to the gospel. You know sometimes it’s four people, sometimes it’s fifteen. I just remember a flood of people started walking forward and getting hit by the beauty of that moment, where people are finding God for the first time and saying ‘Jesus I realize my need for you.’ The Lord spoke to my heart that these people were finding for the first time a love and a relationship that will last forever and never fail.

In partnership with Spotify, Phil Wickham released Spotify Singles, a two-song collection recorded at the Sound Stage in Nashville, Tennessee which included a re-imagined version of "Till I Found You" and a cover of Louis Armstrong's "What a Wonderful World" on October 24, 2018. The song was released to Christian radio on March 15, 2019.

== Composition ==
"Till I Found You" is an electronic R&B song, composed in the key of E major with a tempo of 124 beats per minute. Wickham's vocal range spans from C♯_{4} to B_{5}.

== Music videos ==
The lyric video of "Till I Found You" was published on Phil Wickham's YouTube channel on April 27, 2018. The official music video of the song was then availed on May 17, 2018. The live performance video for the "House Sessions" rendition was released on February 15, 2019, to YouTube. On May 6, 2019, he Singalong 4 live performance video of the song was availed on YouTube.

== Track listing ==
"Till I Found You"
No.	Title	Writer(s)	Length
1.	"Till I Found You"	Phil Wickham; Travis Ryan	4:00

== Charts ==
=== Weekly charts ===
Chart (2018–19)	Peak position
US Hot Christian Songs (Billboard)	9
US Christian Airplay (Billboard)	9
US Christian AC (Billboard)	11
US Christian AC Indicator (Billboard)	11

=== Year-end charts ===
Chart (2019)	Position
US Christian Songs (Billboard)	29
US Christian Airplay (Billboard)	42
US Christian AC (Billboard)	27

== Certifications ==
Region	Certification	Certified units/sales
United States (RIAA)	Gold	500,000^{‡}
^{‡} Sales+streaming figures based on certification alone.

== Release history ==
Region	Date	Format	Label	Ref.
Various	April 27, 2018	Digital download; streaming	Fair Trade Services	
United States	March 15, 2019	Christian radio	Fair Trade Services	
