= Living Hope (album) =

2018 studio album by Phil Wickham

Studio album by Phil Wickham
- Released: August 3, 2018
- Studios: Richmond Park Studio and Unicorn Studio (Highland Park, California)
- Genres: Contemporary worship; contemporary Christian music; CEDM
- Length: 57:01
- Label: Fair Trade Services
- Producers: Ed Cash; Jonathan Smith; Nicolas Balachandran; Ran Jackson; Ricky Jackson

Phil Wickham chronology
Children of God (2016)	Living Hope (2018)	Singalong 4 (2019)

Singles from Living Hope
- 1. "Living Hope" Released: March 30, 2018; 2. "Till I Found You" Released: April 27, 2018; 3. "Great Things" Released: June 1, 2018

Living Hope is the seventh commercial studio album by Phil Wickham, released on August 3, 2018, by Fair Trade Services. Unlike previous albums which were produced solely by Pete Kipley, Wickham chose to work with Ed Cash, Jonathan Smith, Nicolas Balachandran, Ran Jackson and Ricky Jackson.

Supported by the release of the album's title track, "Till I Found You" and "Great Things" as singles along with an album pre-order, Living Hope was released to critical acclaim and was commercially success, having charted in the Top 2 sectors of the American and British Christian music charts, and also peaked at No. 108 on the Billboard 200 in the United States.

== Background ==
On March 30, 2018, Phil Wickham released "Living Hope" as the first single from the anticipated album, which was yet to be announced, with the single's release coinciding with Good Friday and Easter holidays. Wickham then issued "Till I Found You" as the second single on April 27, 2018, announcing the album title as Living Hope and indicated that it was slated for release in August 2018. On June 1, 2018, "Great Things" was released as the third single from Living Hope.

Phil Wickham launched the album pre-order for Living Hope on June 29, 2018, availing the previously released singles with "Song in My Soul" featuring Hollyn released as an instant-grat download, whilst notifying that the album will be released on August 3, 2018, and that he will be celebrate by having a Living Hope Record Release Show at the Theatre at Ace Hotel in Los Angeles. The song, "How Great Is Your Love" was released on July 20, 2018, as the last instant-grat track before the full-length release.

== Release and promotion ==
At the commencement of the digital pre-order period in June 2018, "Living Hope", "Till I Found You", "Great Things" and "Song in My Soul" featuring Hollyn, were availed for instant download, being the first four promotional singles from the album. "How Great Is Your Love" was released on July 20, 2018, as the fifth and final promotional single from the album.

Phil Wickham celebrated the release of the album by having the Living Hope Record Release Show at the Theatre at Ace Hotel in Los Angeles with Mack Brock being his special guest.

== Singles ==
Preceding the release of Living Hope, the album's title track, "Living Hope", was issued as a single on March 30, 2018. This was followed by "Till I Found You" which was also released as a single on April 27, 2018, and "Great Things" which was the third and final single to be released from the album on June 1, 2018.

== Critical reception ==
Professional ratings
Review scores
Source	Rating
365 Days Of Inspiring Media	4.5/5 stars
ChurchMag	5/5 stars
Cross Rhythms	10/10 squares
Hallels	4/5
Jesus Freak Hideout	2/5 stars
Louder Than The Music	5/5 stars
Today's Christian Entertainment	3.7/5

Living Hope prompted generally positive reactions, with good sentiments echoed in reviews about the collection from critics within the CCM and contemporary worship music genres.

Reviewing for 365 Days of Inspiring Media, Jonathan Andre rated the album four and a half stars out of five, describing the worship as "unique, fresh, emotive, powerful and heartfelt," and went onto congratulate Wickham for "such a project that stands tall amongst many worship album releases of 2018 thus far." In a perfect five star review of the album at ChurchMag, Phil Schneider declared that "Phil Wickham's Living Hope is another stellar record from one of Christian music's best male artists." Cross Rhythms music critic Tony Cummings gave the album a perfect ten squares in his review, concluding: "A magnificent album which has the potential to enrich the spiritual lives of huge numbers of churchgoers." Bestowing the album a four-out-of-five rating for Hallels, Timothy Yap concluded "Living Hope, on the whole, is packed with church songs made for us to sing with our brothers and sisters in worship. Despite some spots of sloppiness, this is a treasuretrove for worship leaders and worshippers to mine as we search for ways to express our worship in ways that are Biblically sound and musically accommodating." Awarding a four and a half star rating at Louder Than The Music, Jono Davies assures "This really is a solid and compact album." Kevin Davis, in his review for NewReleaseToday, was of the opinion that Wickham has improved with each release and that Living Hope was "my top worship album of the year." Kelly Meade, indicating in a three-point-seven score review for Today's Christian Entertainment, says that Wickham "captures the essence of worship with this collection of music to allow our hearts & spirits to meditate on the goodness and power of God."

In an otherwise negative review from Jesus Freak Hideout, Lucas Munachen rated the collection two stars, says "Living Hope continues to follow the trend of anthemic, EDM laced music that in turn continues to be a forgettable product of its time." Munachen described the songwriting and production sound as being "so disappointingly artificial that the record simply does not come across as anything more than an impersonal product for the masses."

=== Accolades ===
Year-end lists
Publication	Accolade	Rank	Ref.
NewReleaseToday	Top 10 Worship Albums of 2018	1	

Awards
Year	Organization	Award	Result	Ref.
2019	We Love Christian Music Awards	The Encounter Award (Worship Album of the Year)	Nominated	
2019	We Love Christian Music Awards	Album of the Year	Nominated	
2019	GMA Dove Awards	Worship Album of the Year	Nominated	

== Commercial performance ==
In the United States, Living Hope debuted at No. 22 on Billboard's Christian Albums chart dated August 11, 2018. The album then shot to No. 1 on Christian Albums chart dated August 18, 2018, having earned sales of 7,000 equivalent album units in its first week. Living Hope is Phil Wickham's second album to reach the top spot on the Christian Album chart after Sing-A-Long 3 (2015). The album was also listed as the sixteenth best-selling digital release in the country that same week, with an appearance on the mainstream Billboard 200 chart at No. 108.

In the United Kingdom, Living Hope debuted at No. 2 on the OCC's Official Christian & Gospel Albums Chart dated August 11, 2018.

== Track listing ==
Living Hope – Standard edition
No.	Title	Writer(s)	Length
1.	"Great Things"	Jonas Myrin; Phil Wickham	4:50
2.	"Living Hope"	Wickham; Brian Johnson	5:27
3.	"Breath Away"	Wickham; Ran Jackson; Ricky Jackson; Aaron Ogden; Brian Willet	4:26
4.	"Till I Found You"	Wickham; Travis Ryan	4:00
5.	"How Great Is Your Love"	Brett Younker; Kristian Stanfill; Wickham	5:07
6.	"Boundless"	Wickham	2:00
7.	"Song in My Soul" (featuring Hollyn)	Wickham; Ryan; Jonathan Smith; Brad Beal	3:51
8.	"Wild River"	Chris Tomlin; Wickham	3:54
9.	"Anthem"	Wickham; Josh Silverberg; Ran Jackson; Ricky Jackson	5:19
10.	"Eyes Fixed"	Ben Cantelon; Wickham; Nick Herbert	4:28
11.	"Tethered"	Mia Fieldes; Wickham; Smith	4:42
12.	"Revive Us Again"	Wickham; Smith	3:46
13.	"Christ Is Risen"	Wickham; B. Johnson; Mack Brock	5:10
Total length:			57:01

Living Hope – Deluxe edition
No.	Title	Writer(s)	Length
14.	"On and On" (Bonus Track)	Taylor Johnson; Wickham; Adrian Disch	5:05
15.	"For God So Loved" (Bonus Track)	Jason Ingram; Wickham	4:20
16.	"Living Hope" (House Sessions; Bonus Track)	Wickham; B. Johnson	5:22
17.	"Till I Found You" (House Sessions; Bonus Track)	Wickham; Ryan	3:44
18.	"Till I Found You" (Music Video)		4:00
19.	"Living Hope" (Music Video)		5:31
Total length:			85:02

== Living Hope (The House Sessions) ==
Living Hope (The House Sessions)

Live album by Phil Wickham
- Released: January 18, 2019
- Genre: Contemporary worship music
- Length: 42:13
- Label: Fair Trade Services

Phil Wickham live album chronology
Singalong 3 (2015)	Living Hope (The House Sessions) (2019)	Singalong 4 (2019)

On January 18, 2019, Phil Wickham released a live album with nine live recordings of songs from the album, titled Living Hope (The House Sessions), via Fair Trade Services in digital format.

Living Hope (The House Sessions)
No.	Title	Length
1.	"Intro (King of My Heart)"	1:01
2.	"Great Things"	4:25
3.	"Living Hope"	5:22
4.	"Anthem"	6:51
5.	"Song In My Soul"	4:49
6.	"How Great Is Your Love"	6:34
7.	"Till I Found You"	3:43
8.	"Wild River"	4:12
9.	"Christ Is Risen"	5:10
Total length:		42:08

== Personnel ==
Adapted from AllMusic.

- Phil Wickham – vocals, acoustic guitars (1, 3, 5, 12, 13), electric guitars (7, 11)
- David Ramirez – keyboards (1, 11, 12)
- Jonathan Smith – keyboards (1, 5, 6, 10–13), programming (1, 5, 7, 10–13), bass (5, 7), backing vocals (5, 12, 13), acoustic piano (7, 10, 11), organ (7), acoustic guitars (10), electric guitars (12)
- Ed Cash – programming (2, 8), acoustic guitars (2, 8)
- Nicolas Balachandran – keyboards (3, 4, 9), programming (3, 4, 9), guitars (3, 4, 9), bass (3, 4, 9), backing vocals (3, 4, 9)
- Ran Jackson – keyboards (3, 4, 9), programming (3, 4, 9), guitars (3, 4, 9), bass (3, 4, 9), backing vocals (3, 4, 9)
- Ricky Jackson – keyboards (3, 4, 9), programming (3, 4, 9), guitars (3, 4, 9), bass (3, 4, 9), backing vocals (3, 4, 9)
- Brian Willett – additional programming (3)
- Mark Suhonen – programming (5)
- Joe Williams – programming (5, 7)
- Travis Ryan – additional programming (9)
- Matt Stanfield – keyboards (13)
- Taylor Johnson – electric guitars (1, 5, 7, 10, 13)
- Casey Moore – guitars (2, 8)
- Josh Murty – electric guitars (3)
- Chad Carouthers – bass (1, 10, 12, 13), programming (1, 10, 12)
- Matthew Melton – bass (8)
- Zach Esposito – bass (9)
- Casey Brown – drums (1, 13)
- Paul Mabury – drums (2, 5, 8, 10, 12)
- Aaron Sterling – drums (3, 9)
- Jeremy Larson – cello (11), viola (11), violin (11), string arrangements (11)
- North Coast Worship – backing vocals (1, 5, 7, 9, 13)
- Hollyn – vocals (7)
- David Cook – backing vocals (12)

== Production ==
- Jonathan Smith – producer (1, 5–7, 10–13)
- Ed Cash – producer (2, 8), mixing (2)
- Nicolas Balachandran – producer (3, 4, 9)
- Ran Jackson – producer (3, 4, 9)
- Ricky Jackson – producer (3, 4, 9)
- Buckley Miller – engineer (1, 13)
- Sean Moffitt – mixing (1, 3–13)
- John DeNosky – editing (1, 13)
- Paul Rossetti – editing (5, 7, 10, 11)
- David Cook – editing (12)
- Joe LaPorta – mastering at Sterling Sound (New York, NY)
- Viral M Photography – photography
- BrickHouse Entertainment – management
- Phil Wickham – liner notes

== Charts ==
=== Weekly charts ===
Chart (2018)	Peak position
UK Christian & Gospel Albums (OCC)	2
US Billboard 200	108
US Top Christian Albums (Billboard)	1

=== Year-end charts ===
Chart (2019)	Position
US Christian Albums (Billboard)	36
Chart (2020)	Position
US Christian Albums (Billboard)	44

== Release history ==
Region	Date	Version	Format	Label	Ref.
Various	August 3, 2018	Standard	CD; digital download; streaming	Fair Trade Services	
Various	August 3, 2018	Deluxe	Digital download; streaming	Fair Trade Services	
Various	January 19, 2019	The House Sessions (Live)	Digital download; streaming	Fair Trade Services	
