= Peace, Vol. II =

Studio album by Bethel Music
- Released: November 12, 2021
- Recorded: 2021
- Genre: Contemporary worship music
- Length: 70:04
- Label: Bethel Music
- Producer: Ed Cash; Steven Taylor

Bethel Music chronology
Homecoming (Español) (2021)	Peace, Vol. II (2021)	Simple (2022)

Peace, Vol. II is the fourth studio album by California-based worship collective Bethel Music. It was released on November 12, 2021, through its own imprint label, Bethel Music. The featured worship leaders on the album are Jenn Johnson, Jonathan David & Melissa Helser, Brandon Lake, Brian Johnson, Bethany Wohrle, and Dante Bowe, with guest appearances by Lauren Daigle, We the Kingdom, Pat Barrett, Phil Wickham, and Edward Rivera. Ed Cash collaborated with and Steven Taylor in the production of the album.

Peace, Vol. II debuted at number 32 on Billboard's Top Christian Albums Chart in the United States.

== Background ==
On November 3, 2021, Bethel Music announced that they will be releasing Peace, Vol. II will be released on November 12, 2021. Peace, Vol. II is a follow-up to the critically acclaimed album Peace (2020), a collection of re-imagined versions of ten renowned worship songs and two original songs.

== Recording, production ==
Similar in production style to its predecessor, Peace, Vol. II was recorded using bi-lateral audio, with frequencies scientifically proven to reduce stress and anxiety. Ed Cash, commented on the outcome of the album, saying:

I'm so thankful for the ocean, the birds of the air, the mountain breeze, a gentle rain and how God brings healing to us through His wonderful creation. Peace, Vol, II was a joy to work on—combining God’s healing sounds with calming versions of deep songs inspired by the Word of God has been one of my favorite projects to work on. The science behind using bilateral panning to help bring healing to all kinds of trauma is fascinating. We pray God will bring the healing you need as you listen!

== Reception ==
=== Critical response ===
Professional ratings
Review scores
Source	Rating
365 Days of Inspiring Media	4.5/5
JubileeCast	5/5 stars

Joshua Andre in his 365 Days of Inspiring Media review gave a positive review of the album, noting that Peace, Vol. II "follows in the trend of Peace," then concluding "A brilliant album, and a project I will listen to again and again and again." JubileeCast's Timothy Yap wrote a favourable review of the album, declaring that "Overall, this is a solid album of 12 tracks (many of them are already familiar) re-imagined bringing calmness to our troubled souls. To this end, they succeed with flying colors."

=== Accolades ===
Year-end lists
Publication	Accolade	Rank	Ref.
JubileeCast	Best Christian Albums of 2021	4	

== Commercial performance ==
In the United States, Peace, Vol. II launched at number 32 on the Top Christian Albums Chart dated November 27, 2021.

== Track listing ==
Peace, Vol. II
No.	Title	Writer(s)	Length
1.	"You're Gonna Be OK" (with Jenn Johnson)	Jenn Johnson; Jeremy Riddle; Seth Mosley	4:22
2.	"You Came (Lazarus)" (with Jonathan David Helser & Melissa Helser)	Ed Cash; Jonathan David Helser; Melissa Helser	6:01
3.	"Rescue" (featuring Lauren Daigle)	Jason Ingram; Lauren Daigle; Paul Mabury	5:17
4.	"Graves into Gardens" (with Brandon Lake)	Brandon Lake; Chris Brown; Steven Furtick; Tiffany Hammer	7:34
5.	"The Light in You" (with We The Kingdom)	Andrew Bergthold; E. Cash; Franni Cash; Martin Cash; Scott Cash	4:23
6.	"Battle Belongs" (with Brian Johnson and Jenn Johnson)	Brian Johnson; Phil Wickham	6:13
7.	"Build My Life" (with Pat Barrett)	Brett Steven; Karl Martin; Kirby Kaple; Matt Redman; Pat Barrett	5:18
8.	"Another in the Fire" (with Bethany Wohrle)	Chris Davenport; Joel Houston	5:47
9.	"Way Maker" (with Dante Bowe)	Osinachi Kalu Okoro Egbu	6:01
10.	"Living Hope" (featuring Phil Wickham)	B. Johnson; Wickham	6:20
11.	"It Is Well" (featuring Edward Rivera)	Kristene DiMarco	6:26
12.	"Arrows (I Will Be With You)" (with We The Kingdom)	E. Cash	6:23
Total length:			70:04

== Charts ==
Weekly chart performance for Peace, Vol. II
Chart (2021)	Peak position
US Christian Albums (Billboard)	32

== Release history ==
Region	Date	Format(s)	Label(s)	Ref.
Various	November 12, 2021	Digital download; streaming	Bethel Music	
