= You Hold It All =

EP by Travis Ryan
- Released: August 28, 2015
- Genre: Worship
- Length: 30:51
- Label: Integrity
- Producer: Brandon Collins, Michael Farren, Travis Ryan

Travis Ryan chronology
Fearless (2012)	You Hold It All (2015)	Until My Voice Is Gone (2016)

You Hold It All is the second extended play from Travis Ryan. Integrity Music released the EP on August 28, 2015. Travis Ryan worked with Michael Farren, in the production of this EP.

== Critical reception ==
Professional ratings
Review scores
Source	Rating
365 Days of Inspiring Media	4/5 stars
Louder Than the Music	4/5 stars
Worship Leader	3.5/5 stars

Steven Reed, rating the EP three and a half stars from Worship Leader, says, "Songs range from the Apostle Creed set to music in "We Believe" to the declaration of faith in "You Are Able". " Giving the EP four stars for 365 Days of Inspiring Media, Joshua Andre writes, "You Hold It All is one to savour, and in my opinion is one of the strongest sophomore worship albums I’ve heard in a long time... Well done Travis for a well-constructed and lyrically solid new release". Jono Davies, awarding the EP four stars at Louder Than the Music, states, "As you can see from the cover, there is a majestic mightiness to the songs. Yet it's in the finer detail that this EP proves how amazing it is. Travis sounds great, the songs are fabulous, and the congregation sound immense. Overall this EP is a pretty great effort!"

== Track listing ==
Track list
No.	Title	Length
1.	"We Believe (Live)"	4:53
2.	"Until My Voice Is Gone (Live)"	5:15
3.	"Forever Holy (Live)"	6:23
4.	"You Are Able (Live)"	7:25
5.	"You Hold It All (Live)"	6:55
Total length:		30:51

== Chart performance ==
Chart (2015)	Peak position
US Christian Albums (Billboard)	41
US Heatseekers Albums (Billboard)	23
