= Hello Maker =

Studio album by Bright City
- Released: 7 July 2017
- Recorded: 2017
- Genre: Worship; CEDM; CCM
- Length: 48:48
- Label: Bright City Collective
- Producer: Jonny Bird; Martin Smith (exec.); Paul Nelson (exec.); Sarah Bird (exec.)

Bright City chronology
Bright City (2015)	Hello Maker (2017)	Bright City Presents: Still Volume, 2 (2018)

Singles from Hello Maker
- 1. "You Are the One Thing" Released: 28 April 2017; 2. "Rock of Our Salvation" Released: 19 May 2017

Hello Maker (stylised as HELLO MAKER) is the second studio album by English Christian worship collective Bright City, issued through its imprint label, Bright City Collective, on 7 July 2017. Jonny Bird handled the production of the album alongside executive producers Martin Smith, Paul Nelson and Sarah Bird.

== Background ==
Recorded in early 2017, Hello Maker is the second album to be released by Bright City, following the commercially successful release of their self-titled debut, Bright City in early 2015. Produced by Jonny Bird, under the oversight of Sarah Bird, Paul Nelson and Martin Smith as executive producers, the album is said to be "epic in scale and intimate in nature." Paul Nelson, who also serves as Worship Pastor at St Peter's Church in Brighton (the base of Bright City), elaborated on the concept behind the album, saying:

The Maker of the universe, the Tamer of the tides, the Wildness in the wind – is also the Father who draws close and carries us home to Him; the hands that hold creation were always wrapped around our hearts.

The Hello Maker project is a collection of honest and brave offerings to the One we're made for. Birthed in worship, in our journey as the Bright City family, and in the context of the city we do life in and love, we hope that in some way the songs bring you face to face with Him, as they have done for us.

— Paul Nelson

== Artwork and packaging ==
The album artwork for Hello Maker was designed by Joshua Price. The individual icons on the cover represent the each song on the record, coming together to form a "strong and beautiful collection," reflecting the collective nature of the Bright City team.

== Promotion ==
In a bid to promote the album, Bright City launched the album's pre-order on 6 June 2017 with "You Are the One Thing", "Rock of Our Salvation" and "Your Love" being released as promotional singles as they were availed for instant download.

== Singles ==
Prior to the album's release, Bright City released "You Are the One Thing" on 28 April 2017 as the lead single from the album in digital format. This was followed by the issue of "Rock of Our Salvation" on 19 May 2017, also in digital format.

== Critical reception ==
Professional ratings
Review scores
Source	Rating
Cross Rhythms	10/10 squares
Louder Than The Music	5/5 stars

Reviewing for Cross Rhythms, Lins Honeyman rated the album a perfect ten squares, is of the opinion that it "is full of inventive and innovative dance-oriented worship that thrills as well as inspires," and commended the production team behind the project for "breaking away from the formulaic worship albums that flood the market at this moment in time." The album garnered a five star rating from a Louder Than The Music review by Jono Davies, describes the sound as being inclined to the Hillsong United ballpark stating that it "is not only creative, modern, exciting, energetic and clever, it's also very honest, deep and full of amazing production and musical quality." Davies concluded that "You cannot listen to this album and not be changed."

== Commercial performance ==
Hello Maker became Bright City's second entry on the OCC's Official Christian & Gospel Albums Chart as the sixth best-selling release of the genre in the United Kingdom for the week ending 20 July 2017.

== Track listing ==
Hello Maker
No.	Title	Writer(s)	Length
1.	"Maker of the Moon"	Elle Smith; Holly Roe; Jake Stimson; John Mongan; Jonny Bird; Josh Gale; Lydia McAllister; Martin Smith; Myles Dhillon; Sarah Bird	5:33
2.	"You Are the One Thing"	Henry Marsden; Henry Milne; J. Bird; McAllister; M. Smith; Paul Nelson; S. Bird	3:33
3.	"Father"	Milne; J. Bird; M. Smith; Dhillon; Nelson; S. Bird; Tim Kay	3:34
4.	"Rock of Our Salvation"	M. Smith; Myles Dhillon; Nelson; S. Bird	3:57
5.	"Come Holy Spirit"	Connor Patterson; Milne; McAllister; M. Smith; Matt Maher; Nelson	4:40
6.	"Your Love"	Milne; Stimson; McAllister; M. Smith; Nelson; S. Bird	3:32
7.	"Fly"	E. Smith; Milne; Roe; McAllister; M. Smith; Nelson; S. Bird	3:43
8.	"You Reign"	Milne; Kevin Swartwood; Lizzy Coulson; McAllister; Smith; Nelson; S. Bird	4:36
9.	"Thank You"	Patterson; Milne; M. Smith; Nelson; Kay	4:12
10.	"Song for a Dreamer"	E. Smith; Gale; Josh Price; M. Smith; S. Bird	4:25
Total length:			48:48

== Charts ==
Chart (2017)	Peak position
UK Christian & Gospel Albums (OCC)	6

== Release history ==
Region	Date	Format	Label	Ref.
Worldwide	7 July 2017	CD; digital download; streaming	Bright City Collective	
