= Great Things (Phil Wickham song) =

2018 single by Phil Wickham

Single by Phil Wickham

from the album Living Hope
- Released: June 1, 2018
- Recorded: 2018
- Genre: Contemporary worship music
- Length: 4:50
- Label: Fair Trade Services
- Songwriters: Phil Wickham; Jonas Myrin
- Producer: Jonathan Smith

Phil Wickham singles chronology
"Till I Found You" (2018)	"Great Things" (2018)	"You Cannot Be Stopped" (2019)

Music videos
- "Great Things" (Lyrics) on YouTube
- "Great Things // King of My Heart" (House Sessions) on YouTube
- "Great Things" (Singalong 4 Live) on YouTube

"Great Things" is a song by American contemporary Christian musician Phil Wickham. The song was released on June 1, 2018, as the third single from his seventh studio album, Living Hope (2018). It impacted Christian radio on December 26, 2019. Wickham co-wrote the song with Jonas Myrin, and collaborated with Jonathan Smith in the production of the single.

== Background ==
On June 1, 2018, Phil Wickham released "Great Things" as the third single from Living Hope, an album which was slated for release in August 2018, along with its accompanying lyric video. Wickham shared the story behind the song, saying:

The song "Great Things" was born out of necessity; I had been leading worship regularly at a church called Harvest Christian Fellowship for about 2 years and I found that we really needed more upbeat worship songs that were easy to catch on but still had something special and rich in them to start our services. I sat down over the next couple of weeks and started pouring over scripture and came upon this idea of people in the bible worshiping God as a God who does great things and I thought what a great title for a song full of praise and celebration. With that anchor, I homed in on how He has rescued us from death and conquered the grave. He breaks through the chains that we have to this world and all that comes with that and turns it into a life of freedom.

The song was released to Christian radio on December 26, 2019.

== Composition ==
"Great Things" is a corporate worship song, composed in the key of B Major with a tempo of 124 beats per minute. Wickham's vocal range spans from B_{4} to F♯_{5}.

== Music videos ==
The lyric video of "Great Things" was published on Phil Wickham's YouTube channel on June 12, 2018. The live performance video for the "Great Things // King of My Heart" House Sessions rendition was released on January 18, 2019, to YouTube. On May 6, 2019, the Singalong 4 live performance video of the song was availed on YouTube.

== Accolades ==
Awards
Year	Organization	Award	Result	Ref
2020	GMA Dove Awards	Worship Recorded Song of the Year	Nominated	

== Charts ==
=== Weekly charts ===
Weekly chart performance for "Great Things"
Chart (2018–20)	Peak position
US Hot Christian Songs (Billboard)	11
US Christian Airplay (Billboard)	7

=== Year-end charts ===
Year-end chart performance for "Great Things"
Chart (2020)	Position
US Christian Songs (Billboard)	31
US Christian Airplay (Billboard)	24
US Christian AC (Billboard)	22

== Release history ==
Region	Date	Format	Label	Ref.
Various	June 1, 2018	Digital download; streaming	Fair Trade Services	
United States	December 26, 2019	Christian radio	Fair Trade Services	
