= The Way (New Horizon) =

2018 song by Pat Barrett

Single by Pat Barrett

from the album Pat Barrett
- Released: May 4, 2018
- Genre: Contemporary worship music
- Length: 4:18 (album version); 3:52 (radio edit)
- Label: Bowyer & Bow; Sparrow; Capitol CMG
- Songwriters: Ben Smith; Daniel Bashta; Pat Barrett
- Producer: Ed Cash

Pat Barrett singles chronology
"Good Good Father" (2018)	"The Way (New Horizon)" (2018)	"Sails" (2018)

Music videos
- "The Way (New Horizon)" (Acoustic) on YouTube
- "The Way (New Horizon)" (Lyrics) on YouTube

"The Way (New Horizon)" is a song by American contemporary worship musician Pat Barrett. It was released to Christian radio in the United States as the lead single from his eponymous debut studio album on May 4, 2018. The song was originally released by Housefires as the lead single to their fourth live album, We Say Yes (2017). Barrett co-wrote the song with Brett Younker, Karl Martin, Kirby Kaple, and Matt Redman. Ed Cash produced the single.

"The Way (New Horizon)" peaked at number 12 on the US Hot Christian Songs chart.

== Background ==
Pat Barrett released his eponymous debut extended play on March 30, 2018, containing "The Way (New Horizon)" along with three other tracks in the lead-up to his debut album release scheduled later in the year. "The Way (New Horizon)" impacted Christian radio in the United States as Barrett's debut single on May 4, 2018.

Barrett shared the inspiration behind the song, saying "The way, the truth and the life. It’s a simple sentence, but the way it plays out is not always that simple. Over the past couple of years for Meg & I have had a bunch of changes happen. We just had our 3rd kid recently so we’re in the middle of trusting again with more responsibility, pressure and the unknowns in all of it to believe the same thing with more on the line. It can be challenging at times in a real practical sense where your faith plays out. Singing songs that recognize the humanity of faith which is a lot of unknowns and there’s something about singing that in a true way without giving fear a platform. We all have our things but it’s like David said ‘I’ve set the Lord always before me.’"

== Composition ==
"The Way (New Horizon)" is an energetic guitar led mid-tempo pop song, composed in the key of B♭ with a tempo of 72 beats per minute and a musical time signature of 4/4.

== Critical reception ==
Tony Cummings of Cross Rhythms described the track as a "condensed but powerfully building version of the Housefires' "The Way (New Horizon)"." Joshua Andre of 365 Days of Inspiring Media gave a positive opinion of the song, saying "Debut radio single "The Way (New Horizons)", though lyrically a bit cliché, is enjoyable nonetheless, as this energetic guitar led mid-tempo pop melody ardently relays to us that Jesus is the way, the truth and the life, that Jesus Christ has bought our freedom, and that we can live in that promise because of everything He's done." Reviewing for Eden.co.uk, Aaron Lewendon said of the song: "Every line is a declaration. Simple, short, true. Belief in God doesn’t need grand, complicated statements. It requires an honest heart for God. This is how so much of Pat Barrett’s music is able to connect so readily with people. Through honest simplicity."

== Commercial performance ==
"The Way (New Horizon)" debuted at number 46 on the US Christian Airplay chart dated April 28, 2018. The song became Barrett's first Christian Airplay top ten entry, peaking at number five on the chart.

"The Way (New Horizon)" debuted at number 33 on the US Hot Christian Songs chart dated May 12, 2018. The song peaked at number 12 on the Hot Christian Songs chart.

== Music videos ==
Pat Barrett released the acoustic performance video for "The Way (New Horizon)" through YouTube on March 30, 2018. On April 13, 2018, the official lyric video for the song was availed on YouTube.

== Charts ==
=== Weekly charts ===
Weekly chart performance for "The Way (New Horizon)"
Chart (2018)	Peak position
US Christian Songs (Billboard)	12
US Christian Airplay (Billboard)	5
US Christian AC (Billboard)	7

=== Year-end charts ===
Year-end chart performance for "The Way (New Horizon)"
Chart (2018)	Position
US Christian Songs (Billboard)	24
US Christian Airplay (Billboard)	17
US Christian AC (Billboard)	16

== Release history ==
Release history and formats for "The Way (New Horizon)"
Region	Date	Format	Label	Ref.
United States	May 4, 2018	Christian adult contemporary radio; Christian contemporary hit radio	Bowyer & Bow; Sparrow Records; Capitol Christian Music Group	
