= Better (Pat Barrett song) =

2018 song by Pat Barrett

Single by Pat Barrett

from the album Pat Barrett
- Released: August 2019
- Genre: Contemporary worship music
- Length: 4:57
- Label: Bowyer & Bow; Sparrow; Capitol CMG
- Songwriters: Chris Tomlin; Ed Cash; Pat Barrett
- Producer: Ed Cash

Pat Barrett singles chronology
| "Build My Life" (2018) | "Better" (2019) | "No Weapon" (2020) |

Music videos
- "Better" (Acoustic) on YouTube
- "Better" (Live) on YouTube
- "Better" (Lyrics) on YouTube

"Better" is a song by American contemporary worship musician Pat Barrett. It was released as the fourth and final single from his eponymous debut studio album in August 2019. Barrett co-wrote the song with Chris Tomlin and Ed Cash. Ed Cash produced the single.

"Better" peaked at number 16 on the US Hot Christian Songs chart.

== Background ==
In August 2019, "Better" was released to Christian radio in the United States as the follow-up to "Build My Life" from Pat Barrett's self-titled debut studio album. Barret shared the story behind the song, saying: ""Better" is such a special song to me personally because it has served as a challenge. Money, appearance, power and approval are all unbelievably tempting to live for at times. We cause ourselves (and others) a lot of harm when we set these things at the center of our lives. In the moments where we feel tempted to live for 'lesser' things, we are only left feeling more empty. I hope this song can help redirect the affection of our heart to something (read: Someone) better."

== Composition ==
"Better" is an acoustic guitar led worship song, composed in the key of A♭ with a tempo of 78 beats per minute and a musical time signature of 4/4.

== Critical reception ==
Tony Cummings of Cross Rhythms described the track as having an "almost Ed Sheeran intro"." Joshua Andre of 365 Days of Inspiring Media gave a positive opinion of the song, saying "while slower tempo 5 minute long acoustic guitar led reflective, lullaby-ish and hymn-like melody "Better", co-written with Chris Tomlin, eloquently and vividly describes about how Jesus Christ is better than anything we can ever imagine, and better than our material possessions and the things of this world that we think give us value."

== Commercial performance ==
"Better" debuted at number 49 on the US Christian Airplay chart dated August 17, 2019. The song peaked at number 14 on the Christian Airplay chart.

"Better" debuted at number 39 on the US Hot Christian Songs chart dated August 30, 2019. The song peaked at number 16 on the Hot Christian Songs chart.

== Music videos ==
Pat Barrett released the official audio video for the song via YouTube on March 30, 2018. Pat Barrett published the acoustic performance video of "Better" on April 18, 2018, via YouTube. On July 3, 2019, the official lyric video for the song was availed on YouTube. Pat Barrett released the live performance video for "Better" through YouTube on August 20, 2019.

== Charts ==
=== Weekly charts ===
Weekly chart performance for "Better"
| Chart (2019–2020) | Peak position |
|---|---|
| US Christian Songs (Billboard) | 16 |
| US Christian Airplay (Billboard) | 14 |
| US Christian AC (Billboard) | 18 |

=== Year-end charts ===
Year-end chart performance for "Better"
| Chart (2019) | Position |
|---|---|
| US Christian Songs (Billboard) | 93 |
| Chart (2020) | Position |
| US Christian Songs (Billboard) | 74 |

== Release history ==
Release history and formats for "Better"
| Region | Date | Format | Label | Ref. |
|---|---|---|---|---|
| United States | August 2019 | Christian radio | Bowyer & Bow; Sparrow Records; Capitol Christian Music Group | |
