= Living Hope (song) =

Single by Phil Wickham

from the album Living Hope
- Released: March 30, 2018
- Recorded: 2018
- Genre: Contemporary worship; CCM
- Length: 5:27
- Label: Fair Trade Services
- Songwriters: Phil Wickham; Brian Johnson
- Producers: Ed Cash; Jonathan Smith

Phil Wickham singles chronology
"My All in All" (2017)	"Living Hope" (2018)	"Till I Found You" (2018)

Music videos
- "Living Hope" on YouTube
- "Living Hope" (House Sessions) on YouTube

"Living Hope" is a song by American contemporary Christian musician Phil Wickham. The song was released as the lead single from the album of the same name on March 30, 2018. It impacted Christian radio on May 11, 2018. The song peaked at No. 10 on the US Hot Christian Songs chart, becoming his third Top 10 single. Wickham co-wrote the song with Brian Johnson, and collaborated with Ed Cash, and Jonathan Smith in the production of the song.

== Background ==
"Living Hope" was released as the lead single from his seventh studio album of the same name on March 30, 2018. Wickham announced the single's release coinciding with Good Friday and Easter holidays. Wickham wrote “Living Hope” with Bethel Music's Brian Johnson through text. Johnson sent him a voice memo for the melody, with the two sending their ideas back and forth until it was finished. Wickham describes what the track means to him in a video, "God has rescued us from a place that we could never have rescued ourselves. Our future was death, but Jesus came in and brought life – a living hope – into our souls and into our lives. I love singing the truth of 'Living Hope,' and this song has already become an anthem at both of the churches where we lead. I hope anybody who gets to hear it not only sings along, but their hearts’ cling to it as well."

== Composition ==
"Living Hope" is originally in the key of E-flat major, with a tempo of 143 beats per minute. Written in common time, Wickham's vocal range spans from E_{4} to A_{5} during the song.

== Commercial performance ==
It debuted at No. 35 on the Hot Christian Songs chart. The song left the chart before re-entering on the issue week of January 5, 2019. The song reached the Top 10 after thirty-six weeks, at its peak of No. 10. The track became his third Top 10 on the chart, since "This Is Amazing Grace" in 2014. It debuted at No. 24 on the Billboard Christian Airplay chart on the issue week of June 30, 2018. After a long, twenty-four week climb, it finally reached the Top 10, peaking at No. 9. It lasted 38 weeks on the overall chart, becoming his second longest charting song.

== Accolades ==
Awards
Year	Organization	Award	Result	Ref.
2019	GMA Dove Awards	Song of the Year	Nominated	
2019	GMA Dove Awards	Worship Song of the Year	Nominated	
2019	GMA Dove Awards	Worship Recorded Song of the Year	Won	

== Track listing ==
CD release

1. "Living Hope" – 5:27
2. "Living Hope (Lead Sheet (Medium Key)" – 5:27
3. "Living Hope (Vocal Demonstration)" – 5:18
4. "Living Hope (High Key With Background Vocals)" – 5:18
5. "Living Hope (High Key Without Background Vocals)" – 5:18
6. "Living Hope (Medium Key With Background Vocals)" – 5:18
7. "Living Hope (Medium Key Without Background Vocals)" – 5:18
8. "Living Hope (Low Key With Background Vocals)" – 5:18
9. "Living Hope (Low Key Without Background Vocals)" – 5:18
- Digital download
1. "Living Hope" – 5:27
- Digital download (House Sessions)
1. "Living Hope" – 5:22

== Music videos ==
The music video for the single "Living Hope" was released on March 29, 2018. The video features Wickham and his band performing the track in dimly lit room.

== Cover versions ==
- Bethel Music released a live version of the song, led by Bethany Wohrle as a single. Bethel Music released a duet cover of the song, led by Brian Johnson and Jenn Johnson, on their collective album, Victory (2019).
- Urban Life Worship, a German worship band based at Urban Life Church in Stuttgart covered this song in their 2019 album Mutig komm ich vor den Thron.

== Charts ==
=== Weekly charts ===
Chart (2018)	Peak position
US Hot Christian Songs (Billboard)	10
US Christian Airplay (Billboard)	9
US Christian AC (Billboard)	11
US Christian AC Indicator (Billboard)	14

=== Year-end charts ===
Chart (2018)	Peak position
US Christian AC (Billboard)	49
US Christian Airplay (Billboard)	41
US Christian Songs (Billboard)	31
Chart (2019)	Position
US Christian Songs (Billboard)	71
US Christian Airplay (Billboard)	50

== Certifications ==
Region	Certification	Certified units/sales
United States (RIAA)	Platinum	1,000,000^{‡}
^{‡} Sales+streaming figures based on certification alone.

== Other versions ==
The song appears on the 2019 album, Bethel Music en Español.
