= Noel Robinson (musician) =

English songwriter (born 1962)

- Born: Noel Hugh Robinson; 11 October 1962 (age 63); Willesden London, England
- Origin: Mitcham, London, England
- Genres: Gospel, Contemporary Christian Music
- Occupations: Singer, songwriter
- Instruments: Vocals, Guitar
- Years active: 1996–present
- Labels: Integrity, Kingsway, Nu Image, One Voice, Jubal
- Formerly of: Nu Image
- Website: noelrobinson.com

Noel Hugh Robinson (born 11 October 1962) is a British Christian musician, who primarily plays and mixes Contemporary Christian Music style with gospel music. He has released 7 albums, O Taste and See in 1996, Worthy in This Place in 2001 with Nu Image, Garment of Praise in 2006 with Nu Image, and Devoted in 2013. His fifth album, a live album, Outrageous Love, was released in September 2015. I Surrender, was released in October 2019, Change The Atmosphere released in February 2025

== Early life ==
Noel Hugh Robinson was born in Willesden, London, England, on 11 October 1962, where he was raised in the black Pentecostal church, becoming a Christian, while he was a teenager.

== Music career ==
Robinson's music recording career began in 1996, with the studio album, O Taste and See, released by Jubal Records. His second album, Worthy in This Place, was released in 2001, alongside Nu Image, with Kingsway Records. He release another album with Nu Image, Garment of Praise, in 2006, from One Voice Records. The subsequent studio album, Devoted, was released by Nu Image Music, on 2 July 2013. Outrageous Love, with Integrity Music, on 11 September 2015. I Surrender, with Integrity Music, on 4th October 2019,

Latest Album release Change The Atmosphere' released with Integrity Music on 31st February 2025

Award winning artist

5 Times nominated MOBO; 3xPremier Radio Best Male Artist; Step4ward Best Male Artist; 3xTMMP Male Artist;

== Personal life ==
He resides in Essex, London, England, with his children.

Robinsons early life and rise to British Christian music heights is covered extensively in the groundbreaking book British Black Gospel by Author Steve Alexander Smith.

== Discography ==
Studio albums

- O Taste and See (1996, Jubal)
- Worthy in This Place with Nu Image, (2001, Kingsway Records)
- Garment of Praise with Nu Image, (2006, One Voice)
- Devoted (2 July 2013, Nu Image)
- I Surrender (4th October 2021)

Live albums

- Outrageous Love (11 September 2015, Integrity Music)
- Change the Atmosphere (31st February 2025, Integrity Music)
