= 47th GMA Dove Awards =

2016 US music awards ceremony

- Date: October 11, 2016
- Location: Allen Arena, Nashville, Tennessee
- Hosted by: For King & Country and Tye Tribbett
- Website: http://www.doveawards.com

Television/radio coverage
- Network: TBN (October 16, 2016)

The 47th Annual GMA Dove Awards presentation ceremony was held on October 11, 2016 at the Allen Arena located in Nashville, Tennessee on the campus of Lipscomb University. The ceremony recognized the accomplishments of musicians and other figures within the Christian music industry for the year 2015/2016. The ceremony was produced by the Trinity Broadcasting Network and was hosted by musicians For King & Country and Tye Tribbett. The awards show was broadcast on the Trinity Broadcasting Network on Sunday October 16, 2016.

== Performers ==
The show featured the first performance of DC Talk after a 15-year hiatus. The following were some of the musical artists who performed at the 47th GMA Dove Awards:

- Bethel Music
- Anthony Brown and Group Therapy
- Natalie Grant
- Hollyn
- Hillsong UNITED
- Tamela Mann
- TobyMac
- Matthew West

== Nominees and winners ==
This is a complete list of the nominees for the 48th GMA Dove Awards. The winners are in bold.

=== General ===
==== Song of the Year ====
- “Brother”
  - (writers) Bear Rinehart, Bo Rinehart (publishers) NeedToBreathe Music, Bear Lee Breathing Music
- “First”
  - (writers) Hank Bentley, Jason Ingram, Lauren Daigle, Mia Fieldes, Paul Mabury (publishers) All Essential Music, CentricSongs, Open Hands Music, Upside Down Under, Flychild Publishing, Be Essential Songs, So Essential Tunes, Bentley Street Songs
- “Flawless”
  - (writers) Barry Graul, Bart Millard, Ben Glover, David Garcia, Mike Scheuchzer, Nathan Cochran, Robby Shaffer, Solomon Olds (publishers) Soul Glow Activator Music, 9t One Songs, Universal Music Brentwood Benson Publishing, D Soul Music, MercyMe Music, Wet As A Fish Music, Ariose Music
- **“Good, Good Father”**
  - **(writers) Pat Barrett, Tony Brown** (publishers) Vamos Publishing, Capitol CMG Parago, Common Hymnal Publishing, Housefires Sounds, Tony Brown Publishing Designee, worshiptogether.com songs, sixsteps Music
- “Just Be Held”
  - (writers) Bernie Herms, Mark Hall, Matthew West (publishers) My Refuge Music, Atlas Holdings, Highly Combustible Music, House of Story Music Publishing, Be Essential Songs
- “No Longer Slaves”
  - (writers) Jonathan David Hesler, Brian Johnson, Joel Case (publisher) Bethel Music Publishing
- “The River”
  - (writers) Colby Wedgeworth, Jordan Feliz, Joshua Silverberg (publishers) CentricSongs, Colby Wedgeworth Music, Capitol CMG Amplifier, Red Red Pop, Fair Trade Music Publishing
- “Touch The Sky”
  - (writers) Joel Houston, Dylan Thomas, Michael Guy Chislett (publisher) Hillsong Music Publishing
- “Trust In You”
  - (writers) Lauren Daigle, Michael Farren, Paul Mabury (publishers) CentricSongs, Farren Love And War Publishing, Flychild Publishing, So Essential Tunes, Integrity's Alleluia! Music
- “Worth”
  - (writer) Anthony Brown (publishers) Tyscot Music, Key Of A Music

==== Songwriter of the Year (Artist) ====
- Chris Tomlin
- Joel Houston
- **Lauren Daigle**
- Matt Redman
- Matthew West

==== Songwriter of the Year (Non-Artist) ====
- Bernie Herms
- David Garcia
- **Jason Ingram**
- Michael Farren
- Paul Mabury

==== Contemporary Christian Artist of the Year ====
- Casting Crowns, Reunion Records
- Danny Gokey, BMG Rights Management
- **for King & Country**, Word Entertainment
- Lauren Daigle, Centricity Music
- TobyMac, Forefront Records

==== Southern Gospel Artist of the Year ====
- Ernie Haase & Signature Sound, StowTown Records
- Gaither Vocal Band, Gaither Music Group
- Greater Vision, Daywind Records
- **Karen Peck & New River**, Daywind Records
- The Perrys, StowTown Records

==== Gospel Artist of the Year ====
- Anthony Brown & group therAPy, Tyscot Records
- Hezekiah Walker, Entertainment One
- Jonathan McReynolds, Entertainment One
- **Kirk Franklin**, Fo Yo Soul Recordings/RCA Records
- Tasha Cobbs, Motown Gospel

==== Artist of the Year ====
- for KING & COUNTRY, Word Entertainment
- Hillsong UNITED, Hillsong Music Australia/Sparrow Records
- **Lauren Daigle**, Centricity Music
- Lecrae, Reach Records
- TobyMac, ForeFront Records

==== New Artist of the Year ====
- Hollyn, Gotee Records
- **Jordan Feliz**, Centricity Music
- Stars Go Dim, Word Entertainment
- Travis Greene, RCA Inspiration
- We Are Messengers, Word Entertainment

==== Producer of the Year ====
- **Bernie Herms**
- David Garcia
- Kirk Franklin
- Wayne Haun
- (Team) Seth Mosley & Michael X O’Connor

=== Rap/Hip Hop ===
==== Rap/Hip Hop Recorded Song of the Year ====
- **“Uncomfortable” – Andy Mineo**
  - **(writers) Gabriel Azucena, Ramon Ibanga Jr., Gabriel Lambirth, Andy Mineo, Kortney Pollard, Joseph Prielozny**
- “No Quit” – Derek Minor
  - (writer) Derek Johnson
- “Can’t Do You” – Lecrae
  - (writer) Lecrae Moore
- “I Just Wanna Know” – NF
  - (writers) Nate Feuerstein, Tommee Profitt
- “Jumped Out The Whip” Tedashii
  - (writers) Tedashii Anderson, Gabriel “Gawvi” Azucena

==== Rap/Hip Hop Album of the Year ====
- Uncomfortable – Andy Mineo
  - (producers) 42 North, Alex Medina, Black Knight, Daniel Steele, Dirty Rice, Elhae, Gabriel Lambirth, Gawvi, Illmind, Jon Bellion
- **Therapy Session – NF**
  - **(producers) Tommee Profitt, David Garcia, The720**
- Church Clothes 3 – Lecrae
  - (producers) Black Knight, Epikh Pro, GAWVI, Mykalife, Ryan Righteous, S1
- This Time Around – Tedashii
  - (producers) Gabriel Azucena, Jamaal “Elhae” Jones, Crystal “Crystal Nicole” JohnsonPompey, John “The Kracken” Williams
- Forward – Flame
  - (producers) SPEC, Courtney Orlando, G. Roc

=== Rock/Contemporary ===
==== Rock/Contemporary Recorded Song of the Year ====
- “God is On The Move” – 7eventh Time Down
  - (writers) Mikey Howard, Cliff Williams, Ian Eskelin, Tony Wood
- “Move” – Audio Adrenaline
  - (writers) Adam Agee, Seth Mosley
- **“Happiness” – NEEDTOBREATHE**
  - **(writers) Bo Rinehart, Bear Rinehart, Seth Bolt, Josh Lovelace**
- “Take Me Over” – Red
  - (writers) Johnny Andrews, Anthony Armstrong, Randy Armstrong, Josh Baker, Michael Barnes, Rob Graves, Jason McArthur
- “Live On Forever” – The Afters
  - (writers) Jordan Mohilowski, Dan Ostebo, Matt Fuqua, Josh Havens, Jason Ingram

==== Rock/Contemporary Album of the Year ====
- Cities – Live In New York City – Anberlin
  - (producer) Aaron Sprinkle
- Sound Of The Saints – Audio Adrenaline
  - (producers) Seth Mosley, Joshua Silverberg, Nick Baumhardt
- Dead Man Walking – John Tibbs
  - (producer) Ben Shive
- **The Wonderlands: Sunlight & Shadows – Jon Foreman**
  - **(producers) Tyler Strickland, Anton Patzner, Neal Avron, Keith Tutt, Aaron Roche, Dan Brigham, Jeremy Lutito, Jason Morant**
- Surrender – Kutless
  - (producer) Aaron Sprinkle

=== Pop/Contemporary ===
==== Pop/Contemporary Recorded Song of the Year ====
- “My Story” – Big Daddy Weave
  - (writers) Mike Weaver, Jason Ingram
- “Just Be Held” – Casting Crowns
  - (writers) Mark Hall, Bernie Herms, Matthew West
- “Good Good Father” – Chris Tomlin
  - (writers) Pat Barrett, Tony Brown
- “Tell Your Heart To Beat Again” – Danny Gokey
  - (writers) Bernie Herms, Randy Phillips, Matthew West
- “The River” – Jordan Feliz
  - (writers) Jordan Feliz, Colby Wedgeworth, Joshua Silverberg
- “**Trust In You” – Lauren Daigle**
  - **(writers) Paul Mabury, Michael Farren, Lauren Daigle**

==== Pop/Contemporary Album of the Year ====
- Beautiful Offerings – Big Daddy Weave
  - (producer) Jeremy Redmon
- Empires – Hillsong UNITED
  - (producers) Michael Guy Chislett, Joel Houston
- Be One – Natalie Grant
  - (producers) Bernie Herms, Robert Marvin
- Love Riot – Newsboys
  - (producers) Mark Needham, Zach Hall, Seth Mosley, Mike X O’Conner
- **This Is Not A Test – TobyMac**
  - **(producers) Christopher Stevens, Toby McKeehan, David Garcia**

=== Inspirational ===
==== Inspirational Recorded Song of the Year ====
- “Pieces” – Bethel Music & Amanda Cook
  - (writers) Amanda Cook, Steffany Gretzinger
- “Let It Be Jesus” – Christy Nockels
  - (writers) Chris Tomlin, Jonas Myrin, Matt Redman
- “Heaven's Shore” – David Phelps
  - (writer) David Phelps
- “O Praise the Name (Anastasis)” – Hillsong Worship
  - (writers) Marty Sampson, Benjamin Hastings, Dean Ussher
- **“Till I Met You” – Laura Story**
  - **(writers) Laura Story, Christopher Stevens, Bryan Fowler**

==== Inspirational Album of the Year ====
- **Brave New World – Amanda Cook**
  - **(producers) Jason Ingram, Paul Mabury, Amanda Cook**
- The Burning Edge of Dawn – Andrew Peterson
  - (producers) Gabe Scott, Ben Shive, Joe Causey
- Walls – Gateway Worship
  - (producers) Walker Beach, Josh Alltop, Miguel Noyolla
- OPEN HEAVEN/ River Wild – Hillsong Worship
  - (producer) Michael Guy Chislett
- Hymns II: Shine On Us – Michael W. Smith
  - (producers) Kyle Lee, Jim Daneker, Michael W. Smith

=== Southern Gospel ===
==== Southern Gospel Recorded Song of the Year ====
- “Jesus Changed Everything” – Ernie Haase & Signature Sound
  - (writers) Ernie Haase, Wayne Haun, Joel Lindsey
- “Jesus Gave Me Water” – Gaither Vocal Band
  - (writer) Lucie E. Campbell
- **“I am Blessed” – Karen Peck & New River**
  - **(writers) Karen Peck Gooch, Kenna West, Michael Farren**
- “Keep On” – Perrys
  - (writers) Wayne Haun, Joel Lindsey
- “Jesus, The One” – The Hoppers
  - (writer) Paula Stefanovich

==== Southern Gospel Album of the Year ====
- **Still – Booth Brothers**
  - **(producers) Jason Webb, Lari Goss, Ronnie Booth, Michael Booth, Jim Brady**
- That Day Is Coming – Collingsworth Family
  - (producer) Wayne Haun
- Happy People – Ernie Haase & Signature Sound
  - (producers) Ernie Haase, Wayne Haun, Todd Collins
- How We Love – Mark Lowry
  - (producers) Mark Lowry, Kevin Williams
- Moments Like These – The Bowling Family
  - (producer) Mike Bowling

=== Bluegrass/Country ===
==== Bluegrass Recorded Song of the Year ====
- “He’s In Control” – Doyle Lawson & Quicksilver
  - (writer) Steve Watts
- “In The Heat of the Fire” – Flatt Lonesome
  - (writer) Kelsi Harrigill
- **“Life’s Railway to Heaven (with the Oak Ridge Boys)” – Jimmy Fortune**
  - **(writers) Eliza R. Snow, M.E. Abbey**
- “I’ll Fly Away” – Joey + Rory
  - (writers) Albert E. Brumley
- “Leave It All on the Altar – The Isaacs
  - (writers) Gloria Gaither, William J. Gaither, Buddy Greene

==== Country Recorded Song of the Year ====
- “Love Covered My Sin” – Doug Anderson
  - (writers) Wayne Haun, Randall Garland, Val Dacus
- **“Small Town Someone (Lunch)” – Jeff & Sheri Easter**
  - **(writers) Sheri Easter, Kenna Turner West, Jason Cox**
- “I Believe (with The Whites)” – Jimmy Fortune
  - (writer) Jimmy Fortune
- “He Touched Me” – Joey+Rory
  - (writer) William J. Gaither
- “Seconds Count” – Shenandoah ft. Karen Peck
  - (writers) Coy Fulmer/Doc Walley

==== Bluegrass/Country Album of the Year ====
- **Small Town, Celebrating 30 Years of Music & Marriage – Jeff & Sheri Easter**
  - **(producers) Madison Easter, Greg Cole, Jeff & Sheri Easter**
- Hits & Hymns – Jimmy Fortune
  - (producer) Ben Isaacs
- Hymns That Are Important To Us – Joey+Rory
  - (producers) Rory Lee Feek, Joe West
- Good News Travels Fast – Shenandoah
  - (producers) Bud McGuire, Mike McGuire
- Shoulders – Wilburn & Wilburn
  - (producers) Ben Issacs, Jonathan Wilburn, Jordan Wilburn

=== Contemporary Gospel/Urban ===
==== Contemporary Gospel/Urban Recorded Song of the Year ====
- “Wait On You” – Janice Gaines
  - (writers) Janice Gaines, LaShawn Daniels, Jerren Spruill, Jesse Francois, Jenay Daniels
- **“The Way That You Love Me” – Jonathan McReynolds**
  - **(writers) Chuck Harmony, Claude Kelly**
- “Wanna Be Happy?” – Kirk Franklin
  - (writer) Kirk Franklin
- “One Way” – Tamela Mann
  - (writer) Eric Dawkins
- “I’m Good” – Tim Bowman Jr.
  - (writers) Tim Bowman Jr., Rodney Jerkins, Johna Austin, Marvin WInans Jr, Leon Ware, Authur Ross

==== Urban Worship Recorded Song of the Year ====
- **“Worth” – Anthony Brown & group therAPy**
  - **(writer) Anthony Brown**
- “Fill Me Up” – Tasha Cobbs
  - (writer) William Reagan
- “The Anthem” – Todd Dulaney
  - (writers) Henry Seeley, Joth Hunt, Liz Webber
- “Intentional” – Travis Greene
  - (writer) Travis Greene
- “Spirit Break Out” – William McDowell
  - (writers) Ben Bryant, Luke Hellebronth, Myles Dhillon, Tim Hughes

==== Contemporary Gospel/Urban Album of the Year ====
- Masterpiece – Deitrick Haddon
  - (producers) Marcus Hodge, Chris Blakk, Deitrick Haddon, Siege Monstracity, Christopher Daniels, Tubbyoung, David “Dae Dae” Haddon, Calvin Frazier, BlaqSmurph, Jairus Mozee,
- Life Music: Stage Two – Jonathan McReynolds
  - (producers) Warryn Campbell, Darhyl "DJ" Camper Jr., Chuck Harmony, Israel Houghton, Darryl "Lil Man" Howell, India.Arie, Claude Kelly, Aaron Lindsay, Jonathan McReynolds, PJ Morton, Shannon Sanders
- Fearless – Jonathan Nelson
  - (producers) Jonathan Nelson, Phil Thornton
- **Losing My Religion – Kirk Franklin**
  - **(producer) Kirk Franklin**
- You Shall Live – Marvin Sapp
  - (producer) Aaron W. Lindsey

==== Urban Worship Album of the Year ====
- Keys To My Heart – Briana “Bri” Babineaux
  - (producer) Korey Bowie
- Covered: Alive in Asia – Israel Houghton & New Breed
  - (producers) Israel Houghton, Kevin Camp
- One Place Live – Tasha Cobbs
  - (producers) VaShawn Mitchell, Tasha Cobbs
- The Hill – Travis Greene
  - (producers) Victor Navejar, Travis Greene
- **Sounds of Revival – William McDowell**
  - **(producers) Clay Bogan III, William McDowell**

=== Traditional Gospel ===
==== Traditional Gospel Recorded Song of the Year ====
- “Thank You, Thank You Jesus” – Chicago Mass Choir
  - (writer) Percy Gray, Jr.
- **“Better” – Hezekiah Walker**
  - **(writers) Jason Clayborn, Hezekiah Walker, Gabriel Hatcher**
- “Level Next” – John P. Kee
  - (writer) John P. Kee
- “It’s Alright, It’s OK feat. Anthony Hamilton” – Shirley Caesar
  - (writers) Courtney Rumble, Stanley Brown
- “Put A Praise On It” – Tasha Cobbs,
  - (writer) Tasha Cobbs

==== Traditional Gospel Album of the Year ====
- **Everyday Jesus – Anthony Brown & group therAPy**
  - **(producers) Dr. Leonard S. Scott, Bryant S. Scott, Anthony Brown, VaShawn Mitchell**
- We Give You Praise – Chicago Mass Choir
  - (producers) Percy Gray, Jr., Demetrius Banks, Cornelius Doles, Felica Welch, Dr. Feranda Williamson
- WAP New Era – James Hall Worship & Praise
  - (producers) James Hall, Troy Chambers, Dr. Kevin Bond
- Powerful – Japan Mass Choir
  - (producer) DA Johnson
- Level Next– John P. Kee
  - (producer) John P. Kee

=== Worship ===
==== Worship Song of the Year ====
- **“No Longer Slaves”**
  - **(writers) Jonathan David Hesler, Brian Johnson, Joel Case** (publisher) Bethel Music Publishing
- “Good Good Father”
  - (writers) Pat Barrett, Tony Brown (publishers) Vamos Publishing, Capitol CMG Parago, Common Hymnal Publishing, Housefires Sounds, Tony Brown Publishing Designee, worshiptogether.com songs, sixsteps Music
- “Touch the Sky”
  - (writers) Joel Houston, Dylan Thomas, Michael Guy Chislett (publisher) Hillsong Music Publishing
- “We Believe”
  - (writers) Travis Ryan, Richie Fike, Matt Hooper (publishers) Integrity Worship Music, Integrity's Praise! Music, Life Worship, Travis Ryan Music
- “Even So Come”
  - (writers) Jess Cates, Jason Ingram, Chris Tomlin (publisher) S. D. G. Publishing, Sixsteps Songs, Worship Together Music, Open Hands Music, So Essential Tunes, Lily Makes Music

==== Worship Album of the Year ====
- Have It All – Bethel Music
  - (producers) Chris Greely, Bobby Strand
- A Live Worship Experience – Casting Crowns
  - (producer) Mark A. Miller
- Here As It Is In Heaven – Elevation Worship
  - (producers) Mack Brock, Aaron Robertson
- **Empires – Hillsong United**
  - **(producers) Michael Guy Chislett, Joel Houston**
- Let It Echo – Jesus Culture
  - (producer) Jeremy Edwardson

=== Instrumental ===
==== Instrumental Album of the Year ====
- Full Tank 2.0 – Ben Tankard
  - (producer) Ben Tankard
- **Without Words: Synthesia – Bethel Music**
  - **(producers) Bobby Strand, Chris Greely**
- Piano Lullabies (Vol. 1) – Hillsong Kids Jr.
  - (producer) David Andrew
- Unchanging Grace – Lucid Collection
  - (producer) Steve Wingfield
- Soak – New Life Worship
  - (producer) Jonathan Moos

=== Children's ===
==== Children's Music Album of the Year ====
- Who’s Got Their Armor On? – Bear Hug Band
  - (producers) Neil Godding, Landon Bailey
- **Come Alive – Bethel Music Kids**
  - **(producers) Jason Ingram, Paul Mabury**
- Sing The Bible With Slugs And Bugs, Volume 2 – Randall Goodgame
  - (producer) Ben Shive
- Sweet Dreams – Sandi Patty
  - (producer) Steve Wingfield
- Fun Size, Vol. 1 – Scripture Snacks Kids
  - (producer) Jack Shocklee

==== Youth/Children's Musical of the Year ====
- Christmas in Black & White
  - (creators) Jeff Slaughter, Jeff Anderson
- Christmas in Kid City
  - (creators) Dave Clark, Emily Mingledorff
- Legends at Camp Garner Creek
  - (creators) Dave Clark, Emily Mingledorff
- **The Kingdom Connection**
  - **(creator) Christy Semsen**
- UNITED – The Modern Youth Choir
  - (arranger) Cliff Duren

=== Spanish Language ===
==== Spanish Language Album of the Year ====
- Derroche De Amor – Alex Campos
  - (producers) Juan David Botello, Alex Campos, Javier Sorano
- **Eterno Live – Christine D’Clario**
  - **(producers) Michael Farren, Christine D’Clario**
- Principio Y Fin – Evan Craft
  - (producer) Sean Cook
- En Esto Creo – Hillsong en Espanol
  - (producer) Toni Romero
- Sigues Siendo Dios En Vivo Desde Argentina – Marcos Witt
  - (producer) Marcos Witt
- Dios Me Ama – Thalles Roberto
  - (producer) Aaron Lindsey, Thalles Roberto, Fabio Aposan

=== Special Event/Other ===
==== Special Event Album of the Year ====
- Blessed Assurance: The New Hymns of Fanny Crosby – Various
  - (producers) Bobby Blazier, John Hartley
- Let the Glory Come Down – Bill & Gloria Gaither and Friends
  - (producers) Geron Davis, Bradley Knight
- Passion: Salvation's Tide Is Rising – Passion
  - (producers) David Crowder, Gabe Scott, Ed Cash, David Garcia, Ross Copperman, Seth Mosley, Nathan Nockels, Shama “Sake Pase, Joseph, Maurice “Jimi Cravity” Willis, Solomon Olds
- The Passion: New Orleans – Various/The Passion Cast
  - (producers) Adam Anders, Peer Astrom
- **We Will Stand – Various**
  - **(producers) Michael Omartian, Dan Posthuma**

==== Christmas Album of the Year ====
- Adore: Christmas Songs of Worship (Live) – Chris Tomlin
  - (producer) Ed Cash
- **Christmas is Here – Danny Gokey**
  - **(producer) Keith Thomas**
- God with Us – Laura Story
  - (producers) Brown Bannister, Cliff Duren, Andrew Osenga
- O Come Emmanuel – Various
  - (producers) Andrew Geer, Kyle Buchanan
- MercyMe, It’s Christmas! – MercyMe
  - (producers) Brown Bannister, Ben Shive

==== Musical of the Year ====
- Bethlehem Morning
  - (creators) Russel Mauldin, Sue C. Smith
- Jesus, Only Jesus
  - (creator) Craig Adams
- **That’s Where The Story Begins**
  - **(creators) Dave Clark, Gerald Crabb, Mike Harland**
- This Changes Everything
  - (creators) Marty Funderbunrk, Joseph Habedank
- Under a Starry Sky (A Dramatic Musical for Christmas)
  - (creators) Joel Lindsey, Jeff Bumgardner

==== Choral Collection of the Year ====
- Burning Lights – Choral Collection
  - (arranger) Cliff Duren
- Fantasia Noel (Songs of the Season for Choir and Orchestra)
  - (arranger & orchestrator) Joshua Spacht
- My Hope (Songs & Message of Billy Graham)
  - (arranger) Travis Cottrell
- **Southern Gospel Songs (10 New, Emerging and Classic Hits for Southern Gospel Choir)**
  - **(arranger & orchestrator) Marty Hamby**
- Timeless (Ageless and Enduring Songs of Worship)
  - (arrangers) David Wise, David Shipps (orchestrator) David Shipps

==== Recorded Music Packaging of the Year ====
- Have It All – Bethel Music
  - (art director) Kiley Goodpasture (graphic artist & photographer) Stephen Hart
- Come Alive Bethel Music Kids
  - (art director) Kiley Goodpasture (graphic artist & photographer) Stephen Hart (photographer) Justin Posey
- **Empires – Hillsong UNITED**
  - **(art directors) Joel Houston, Jay Argaet (graphic artist) Nathan Cahyadi**
- Youth Revival – Hillsong Y&F
  - (art director) Jay Argaet, Nathan Cahyadi, Nathaniel Redekop
- O Come Emmanuel – Various
  - (graphic artist) The Parable Group

=== Videos ===
==== Short Form Video of the Year ====
- Tell Your Heart To Beat Again – Danny Gokey
  - (director & producer) Kristen Barlowe
- Be Like Jesus – Deitrick Haddon
  - (director) Yolande Geralds (producer) Don Le
- The Way You Love Me – Jonathan McReynolds
  - (director & producer) Derek Blanks
- Mr. Roboto – Rapture Ruckus
  - (director & producer) Kyle Dettman
- **Live On Forever – The Afters**
  - **(director & producer) Nathan William**

==== Long Form Video of the Year ====
- Come Alive – Bethel Music Kids
  - (director) David Noroña (producer) Kiley Goodpasture
- Neon Porch Extravaganza LIVE – Crowder
  - (director) Nathan Corrona (producers) Shelley Giglio, Mike McCloskey
- Youth Revival – Hillsong Y&F
  - (director) Jamin Tasker (producer) Ben Field
- **Hymns That Are Important To Us – Joey + Rory**
  - **(director) Daniel Grace (producer) Aaron Carnahan, Joel McAfee, Bill Gaither**
- #LetsGo – Planetshakers
  - (director) Pete Seamons, Peter John (producer) Russell Evans, Mike Pilmer, Joth Hunt, Josh Brown
- CCM United – Various
  - (director) Michael Omartian (producer) Stephen Yake

=== Films ===
==== Inspirational Film of the Year ====
- God’s Not Dead 2
  - (director) Harold Cronk (producer) Pure Flix Productions
- Miracles From Heaven
  - (director) Patricia Riggen (producer) TriStar Pictures in association with AFFIRM Films
- Risen
  - (director) Kevin Reynolds (producers) LD Entertainment, AFFIRM Films
- **War Room**
  - **(director) Alex Kendrick (producers)** Kendrick Brothers Pictures, AFFIRM Films
- Woodlawn
  - (directors) Andrew Erwin, Jon Erwin (producer) Erwin Brothers Entertainment
