= Bright City =

English Christian worship music collective

- Origin: Brighton, England, UK
- Genres: Praise & worship; Contemporary Christian; CEDM; rock
- Years active: 2015–present
- Labels: Bright City Collective; Integrity Music
- Website: brightcityuk.com

Bright City is an English Christian worship collective, based out of St Peter's Church in Brighton, United Kingdom.

== Career ==
The collective started out in 2015 with the release of their eponymous debut album Bright City, their breakthrough release on the UK Official Christian & Gospel Albums Chart at No. 2. This was followed by their sophomore release, Hello Maker (2017), with both albums being released on their imprint label, Bright City Collective. Hello Maker was No. 6 on the Official Christian & Gospel Albums Chart. Integrity Music featured the group on its Still instrumental series, with Bright City Presents: Still, Volume 2 being Bright City's third issue in 2018.

== Members ==
The members of the Bright City collective include

- Paul Nelson
- Sarah Bird
- Henry Milne
- Lydia McAllister
- Elle Limebear

== Discography ==
=== Albums ===
List of albums, with selected chart positions
Title	Album details	Peak chart positions
Title	Album details	UK C&G
Bright City	Debut album; Released: 16 March 2015; Label: Bright City Collective; Format: CD, digital download, streaming	2
Hello Maker	Second album; Released: 7 July 2017; Label: Bright City Collective; Format: CD, digital download, streaming	6
Bright City Presents: Still, Volume 2	Instrumental album; Released: 2 March 2018; Label: Integrity Music; Format: CD, digital download, streaming	—
Change	Live album; Released: 29 May 2020; Label: Integrity Music; Format: CD, digital download, streaming	—

=== Singles ===
List of singles and peak chart positions
Year	Single	Album
2015	"Colour"	Bright City
2017	"You Are the One Thing"	Hello Maker
2017	"Rock of Our Salvation"	Hello Maker
2018	"Great Are You Lord"	Bright City Presents: Still, Volume 2
2018	"Hope Lives"	non-album single
2020	"Change"	Change
2020	"Christ In Me"	Change
2020	"Not Going Back"	Change
2020	"Broken Hallelujah"	Change
