= Bright City Presents: Still, Volume 2 =

Studio album by Bright City
- Released: 2 March 2018
- Recorded: 2017
- Genres: Worship; CEDM; CCM
- Length: 60:54
- Label: Integrity Music
- Producer: Jonny Bird

Bright City chronology
Hello Maker (2017)	Bright City Presents: Still, Volume 2 (2018)

Integrity Music Still series chronology
Rivers & Robots Presents: Still Volume, 1 (2017)	Bright City Presents: Still, Volume 2 (2018)

Singles from Bright City Presents: Still, Volume 2
- 1. "Great Are You Lord" Released: 28 January 2017

Bright City Presents: Still, Volume 2 (also referred to as Still Volume 2) is the third studio album by English Christian worship collective Bright City, released by Integrity Music on 2 March 2018. It also the second release in the Still instrumental series by Integrity Music, initiated in 2017. Still Volume 2 was recorded at different locations in the United Kingdom and mastered at Abbey Road Studios, Jonny Bird worked on the production of the album.

== Background ==
The album is the second installment in the Still series of instrumental albums being released through Integrity Music, featuring a different artist/producer. It is a follow-up to the first installment issued in 2017, featuring Rivers & Robots.

== Singles ==
On 26 January 2018, Bright City released "Great Are You Lord" via Integrity Music as the lead single from the album in digital format.

== Critical reception ==
Professional ratings
Review scores
Source	Rating
365 Days Of Inspiring Media	4/5
Cross Rhythms	9/10 squares
Louder Than The Music	5/5 stars

Jonathan Andre, giving the album a score of four-out-of-five at 365 Days of Inspiring Media, recommended the album to classical, instrumental and worship music listeners, exclaiming that the album is "a great fusion of modern music sounds with songs that people have heard in Sunday services for years!" Stephen Luff, indicating in a nine square review at Cross Rhythms, concludes, "It is great to hear an album challenging the status quo in the instrumental worship genre which too often in the past has found itself in a rut." At Louder Than The Music, Jono Davies rated the album a perfect five stars, expressing the sentiment that "everything on this album feels so current," and commended Bright City saying, "[they] have taken time to work through these songs and make them their own and have done a wonderful job at that."

== Track listing ==
Bright City Presents: Still, Volume 2
No.	Title	Writer(s)	Length
1.	"Our God Reigns"	Martin Smith	1:55
2.	"Here For You"	Matt Maher; Matt Redman; Jesse Reeves; Tim Wanstall	4:35
3.	"Great Are You Lord"	Leslie Jordan; David Leonard; Jason Ingram	4:16
4.	"Before the Throne of God Above"	Charitie Lees Bancroft; Vikki Cook	4:51
5.	"Spirit Break Out"	Ben Bryant; Luke Hellebronth; Myles Dhillon; Tim Hughes	4:43
6.	"Waiting Here For You"	Smith; Chris Tomlin; Reeves	6:07
7.	"No Longer Slaves"	Brian Johnson; Joel Case; Jonathan David Helser	4:38
8.	"Forever Yours"	Smith; Henry Milne; Matt Bray	3:58
9.	"What a Beautiful Name"	Ben Fielding; Brooke Ligertwood	4:18
10.	"Build My Life"	Brett Younker; Redman; Pat Barrett; Karl Martin; Kirby Kaple	5:56
11.	"Rock of Our Salvation"	Smith; Myles Dhillon; Paul Nelson; Sarah Bird	6:18
12.	"When I Survey"	Isaac Watts	4:35
13.	"So Will I (100 Billion X)"	Benjamin Hastings; Joel Houston; Michael Fatkin	4:44
Total length:			60:54

== Bright City Presents: Still, Volume 2 (5 Day Devotional) EP ==
Bright City Presents: Still, Volume 2 (5 Day Devotional)

EP by Bright City
- Released: 2 March 2018
- Recorded: 2017
- Length: 21:20
- Label: Integrity Music

Bright City Presents: Still, Volume 2 (5 Day Devotional) is an extended play by Bright City released through Integrity Music on music streaming service Spotify. Integrity Music also published a five-day devotional reading plan on Bible.com, where Paul Nelson of Bright City explained:

Taking time each day to be still before God is one of the most life-changing things we can do. Join me on this plan as we acknowledge that the Lord is God over the busyness and battles of daily life. Draw close to hear His whisper, let your soul be quieted by His song of love, and receive His hope at the foot of the cross.

— Paul Nelson, Bright City

Bright City Presents: Still, Volume 2 (5 Day Devotional) EP
No.	Title	Length
1.	"Introduction"	0:40
2.	"Day 1: Be Still"	4:13
3.	"Day 2: Standing Still"	3:30
4.	"Day 3: Still Small Voices"	4:18
5.	"Day 4: Still Listening"	4:04
6.	"Day 5: Still Standing"	4:35
Total length:		21:20

== Release history ==
Region	Date	Version	Format	Label	Ref.
Worldwide	2 March 2018	Album	CD; digital download; streaming	Integrity Music	
Worldwide	2 March 2018	Devotional EP	Streaming	Integrity Music	
