= Fearless (Travis Ryan album) =

Studio album by Travis Ryan
- Released: April 10, 2012
- Genre: Contemporary Christian music, worship
- Length: 50:43
- Label: Integrity
- Producer: Josh Auer, Dan Bailey, Brandon Collins

Fearless is the first studio album by Travis Ryan. Integrity Music released the album on April 10, 2012. Ryan worked with producers, Josh Auer, Dan Bailey, Brandon Collins, in the making of this album.

== Critical reception ==
Professional ratings
Review scores
Source	Rating
The Christian Music Review Blog	8/10
Christian Music Zine	4.25/5
Cross Rhythms	9/10 squares
Indie Vision Music	3/5 stars
Jesus Freak Hideout	3/5 stars
Louder Than the Music	4/5 stars
New Release Tuesday	3.5/5 stars

Rating the album a nine out of ten from Cross Rhythms, Lins Honeyman writes, "this impressive debut release." Roger Gelwicks, giving the album three stars at Jesus Freak Hideout, states, "Fearless does more right than wrong". Awarding the album three and a half stars by New Release Tuesday, Kelly Sheads says, "'Fearless' is a great start." Jonathan Andre, rating the album three stars for Indie Vision Music, describes, "a must-buy album for reflective worship and bold". Giving the album four stars from Louder Than the Music, Jono Davies writes, "a very elegant album". Jonathan Kemp, awarding the album an eight out of ten at The Christian Music Review Blog, states, "a topnotch album". Indicating in a 4.25 out of five review by Christian Music Zine, Joshua Andre describes, it "is one to savour".

== Track listing ==
No.	Title	Writer(s)	Length
1.	"Love That Has Won"	Ben Cantelon, Matt Collins, Travis Ryan	3:42
2.	"Battle Song"	Josh Auer, Dan Bailey, Collins, Ryan	4:05
3.	"Jesus Precious Jesus"	Leslie Jordan, David Leonard, Ryan	4:15
4.	"The Wrestling"	Collins, Ritchie Fike, Ryan	5:23
5.	"Most High"	Jason Ingram, Ryan	4:44
6.	"Jesus My Victory"	Brenton Brown, Collins, Ryan	5:38
7.	"Awaken Us"	Collins, Matt Redman, Ryan	3:58
8.	"Fearless"	Collins, Ryan	4:14
9.	"My Devotion"	Ryan, Anthony Skinner	4:18
10.	"You Are with Me Still"	Caleb Clements, Collins, Todd Proctor, Ryan	3:56
11.	"Chase"	Collins, Redman, Ryan	6:34
Total length:			50:43
