= Pat Barrett (album) =

2018 studio album by Pat Barrett

Studio album by Pat Barrett
- Released: July 20, 2018
- Recorded: 2017–2018
- Studio: Ed's (Franklin, Tennessee)
- Genre: Contemporary worship music
- Length: 61:47
- Label: Bowyer & Bow; Sparrow; Capitol CMG
- Producer: Ed Cash

Pat Barrett chronology
Pat Barrett (EP) (2018)	Pat Barrett (2018)	Canvas and Clay (2019)

Singles from My Jesus
- 1. "The Way (New Horizon)" Released: May 4, 2018; 2. "Sails" Released: September 26, 2018; 3. "Build My Life" Released: December 21, 2018; 4. "Better" Released: August 2019

Pat Barrett is the debut studio album by American contemporary worship musician Pat Barrett, which was released via Bowyer & Bow Capitol Christian Music Group on July 20, 2018. The album features guest appearances by Steffany Gretzinger and Amanda Cook. Ed Cash handled the production of the album.

The album was supported by the release of "The Way (New Horizon)," "Sails," "Build My Life," and "Better" as singles. "The Way (New Horizon)" peaked at number 12 on the Hot Christian Songs chart. "Build My Life" peaked at number four on the Hot Christian Songs chart. "Better" peaked at number 16 on the Hot Christian Songs chart.

The album garnered positive reviews from critics who commended Barrett for honest and vulnerable lyricism. Pat Barrett debuted at number 22 on Billboard's Top Christian Albums chart in the United States, and number 11 on the Official Christian & Gospel Albums Chart in the United Kingdom. "Build My Life" was nominated for the GMA Dove Award for Worship Song of the Year and Worship Recorded Song of the Year at the 2019 GMA Dove Awards.

== Background ==
On March 19, 2018, Chris Tomlin announced that Pat Barrett would be the first artist signed to Bowyer & Bow his new imprint with Capitol Christian Music Group. On March 30, 2018, Pat Barrett released his eponymous debut extended play and announced that his debut studio album was slated for release later in the year. On June 4, 2018, Barrett that he will be releasing his self-titled debut studio album on July 20, 2018.

== Release and promotion ==
=== Singles ===
"The Way (New Horizon)" impacted Christian radio in the United States as Barrett's debut single on May 4, 2018. "The Way (New Horizon)" peaked at number 12 on the Hot Christian Songs chart.

Barrett released "Sails" featuring Steffany Gretzinger and Amanda Cook as the second single from Pat Barrett (2018) on September 26, 2018.

On December 21, 2018, Barrett released "Build My Life" as the third single from his self-titled studio album. "Build My Life" peaked at number four on the Hot Christian Songs chart. "Build My Life" received two nominations for the GMA Dove Award for Worship Song of the Year and Worship Recorded Song of the Year at the 2019 GMA Dove Awards.

Barrett released "Better" as the fourth single from the album in August 2019. "Better" peaked at number 16 on the Hot Christian Songs chart.

== Critical reception ==
Professional ratings
Review scores
Source	Rating
365 Days of Inspiring Media	4/5
CCM Magazine	4.5/5 stars
Cross Rhythms	9/10 squares

Joshua Andre in his 365 Days of Inspiring Media review opined that "This project though is lyrically near-flawless and extremely encouraging, and Pat definitely deserves kudos for delivering a debut album that is sure to have people talking. " At CCM Magazine, John Barber commented "You can come for the huge songs, but it’s the quiet ones that will leave you speechless. Pat Barrett is the kind of record that will find its way into your earbuds and stay there for a long time. There are depths to mine on this album and the journey is incredibly rewarding." Reviewing for Cross Rhythms, Tony Cummings concluded that Pat Barrett is a "top rate album." NewReleaseToday's Jasmin Patterson wrote a positive review of the album, saying: "There is so much to love about Pat Barret's solo debut. True to his style as a worship leader, when Pat opens his heart in prayer and praise to God, it draws you in to connect with God and feel comfortable expressing your heart to Him as well." In a favourable review for Eden.co.uk, Aaron Lewendon wrote "This is an album with a voice. So much worship today is group-led, which is perfect for Churches and worship communities. But there is a lack of the personal, confession, and nakedly honest experiences of Christianity in music today. This album offers something not often seen, not often heard, but often needed."

== Commercial performance ==
In the United States, Pat Barrett debuted at number 20 on the Top Christian Albums chart in the United States dated August 4, 2018. The album concurrently registered on the Heatseekers Albums chart at number 11.

Pat Barrett also debuted on the OCC's Official Christian & Gospel Albums Chart in the United Kingdom, launching at number 11 in the week ending August 2, 2018.

== Track listing ==
Pat Barrett track listing
No.	Title	Writer(s)	Length
1.	"Into Faith I Go"	Ed Cash; Pat Barrett	4:34
2.	"God Is So Good (You Are Worthy)"	Ben Smith; Daniel Bashta; Barrett; Traditional	7:56
3.	"The Way (New Horizon)"	Smith; Bashta; Barrett	4:18
4.	"Everything Is Sacred"	Jonathan Jay; Pat Barrett	3:47
5.	"Better"	Chris Tomlin; E. Cash; Barrett	4:57
6.	"My Hallelujah"	Smith; Brenton Brown; Tomlin; Bashta; Jason Ingram; Barrett	6:23
7.	"Be Still My Soul"	Brown; Tomlin; Ingram; Barrett	3:42
8.	"Build My Life"	Brett Younker; Karl Martin; Kirby Kaple; Matt Redman; Pat Barrett	4:04
9.	"Hymn of the Holy Spirit"	Brown; Tomlin; Ingram; Barrett	5:09
10.	"Sparrows and Lilies"	E. Cash; Barrett; Scott Cash	3:34
11.	"Sing to the Lord (Banner)"	Smith; Tomlin; Bashta; E. Cash; Barrett	7:54
12.	"Sails" (featuring Steffany Gretzinger and Amanda Cook)	Amanda Cook; Smith; Bashta; Barrett; Steffany Gretzinger	5:23
Total length:			61:47

== Personnel ==
Adapted from AllMusic.

- Pat Barrett — primary artist
- Andrew Bergthold — background vocals, keyboards
- Kyle Briskin — background vocals, bass
- Ed Cash — acoustic guitar, background vocals, drums, electric guitar, engineer, keyboards, mixing, producer, programming
- Franni Cash — background vocals
- Martin Cash — background vocals, drums, percussion
- Scott Cash — background vocals, electric guitar, programming
- Judson Collier — package design
- Amanda Cook — featured artist
- Ian Fitchuk — drums, keyboards, programming
- Steffany Gretzinger — featured artist
- Jeremy S.H. Griffith — mixing
- Jason Ingram — piano
- Joe LaPorta — mastering
- Andrew Marcus — background vocals
- Matthew Melton — bass
- Brad O'Donnell — executive producer
- Mary Caroline Russell — photography
- Chris Tomlin — executive producer

== Charts ==
Chart performance for Pat Barrett
Chart (2018)	Peak position
UK Christian & Gospel Albums (OCC)	11
US Christian Albums (Billboard)	22
US Top Heatseekers (Billboard)	11

== Release history ==
Release history and formats for Pat Barrett
Region	Date	Format	Label	Ref.
Various	July 20, 2018	Digital download; streaming	Bowyer & Bow; Sparrow Records; Capitol Christian Music Group	
