= 50th GMA Dove Awards =

2019 US music awards ceremony

- Date: October 15, 2019
- Location: Allen Arena, Nashville, Tennessee
- Country: United States

Highlights
- Most awards: Jason Ingram (4)
- Most nominations: Wayne Haun (10)
- Website: www.doveawards.com

Television/radio coverage
- Network: TBN (October 20, 2019 at 8 p.m. ET)

The 50th Annual GMA Dove Awards presentation ceremony was held on Tuesday, October 15, 2019, at the Allen Arena in Nashville, Tennessee. The ceremony recognized the accomplishments of musicians and other figures within the Christian music industry for the year 2019. The awards show aired on the Trinity Broadcasting Network on Sunday, October 20, 2019, at 8 p.m. ET.

The nominations were announced on August 14, 2019, with producer and songwriter Wayne Haun receiving the most nominations with ten, whilst Lauren Daigle led the artist nominations with six. The big winners of the night were producer and songwriter Jason Ingram with four awards and Lauren Daigle, who received three awards.

== Nominations announcement ==
The nominations were announced on August 14, 2019, by Natalie Grant, Jekalyn Carr and Karen Peck through a live stream on the GMA Dove Awards' Facebook page.

== Performers ==
The following musical artists performed at the 50th GMA Dove Awards:

- Josh Baldwin
- Shirley Caesar
- Jekalyn Carr
- Casting Crowns
- Steven Curtis Chapman
- Riley Clemmons
- Aaron Cole
- Dorinda Clark Cole
- Michael English
- Kirk Franklin
- Austin French
- Gaither Vocal Band
- Kelontae Gavin
- Gawvi
- Amy Grant
- Joseph Habedank
- Hillsong Worship
- Brian Johnson and the Bethel Music band
- Lecrae
- Ledger
- Mark Lowry
- Matt Maher
- Jonathan McReynolds
- MercyMe
- Bart Millard
- Karen Peck and New River
- David Phelps
- Michael W. Smith
- Russ Taff
- Tedashii
- TobyMac
- Triumphant Quartet
- Matthew West
- Phil Wickham
- CeCe Winans

== Presenters ==
The following served as presenters at the 50th GMA Dove Awards:

- Brown Bannister
- Pat Barrett
- Francesca Battistelli
- Blanca
- Pat Boone
- Anthony Brown
- Shirley Caesar
- Jeremy Camp
- Evan Craft
- John Crist
- Lauren Daigle
- For King & Country
- Gloria Gaither
- Kathy Lee Gifford
- Danny Gokey
- Natalie Grant
- Koryn Hawthorne
- Pastor Brian Houston
- Kari Jobe
- Dr. Bobby Jones
- Donald Lawrence
- Tasha Cobbs Leonard
- William McDowell
- Don Moen
- Nicole C. Mullen
- Chonda Pierce
- Point of Grace
- Josh Turner
- Tauren Wells
- Zach Williams

== Nominees and winners ==
This is a complete list of the nominees for the 50th GMA Dove Awards. Winners are in bold.

=== General ===
Song of the Year

- "Counting Every Blessing"
  - (writers) Chris Llewellyn, Gareth Gilkeson, (publishers) Capitol CMG Paragon, Rend Family Music
- "Everything"
  - (writers) David Garcia, Toby McKeehan, (publishers) Achtober Songs, D Soul Music, Universal Music - Brentwood Benson Publishing
- "Joy."
  - (writers) Ben Glover, Joel Smallbone, Luke Smallbone, Matt Hales, Seth Mosley, Stephen Blake Kanicka, Tedd Tjornhom, (publishers) 9t One Songs, Ariose Music, CentricSongs, Curb Wordspring Music LLC, Fleauxmotion Music, Kilns Music, Method to the Madness, Shankel Songs, Shaun Shankel Pub Designee, Stephen Blake Kanicka Publishing, These Tunes Go To 11, Warner-Tamerlane Publishing Corp.
- "Known"
  - (writers) Ethan Hulse, Jordan Sapp, Tauren Wells, (publishers) Be Essential Songs, Capitol CMG Paragon, Crucial Music Entertainment, EGH Music Publishing
- "Living Hope"
  - (writers) Brian Johnson, Phil Wickham, (publishers) Bethel Music Publishing, Phil Wickham Music, Simply Global Songs, Sing My Songs
- "Only Jesus"
  - (writers) Bernie Herms, Mark Hall, Matthew West, (publishers) Be Essential Songs, Highly Combustible Music, House of Story Music Publishing, My Refuge Music, One77 Songs
- "Red Letters"
  - (writers) David Crowder, Ed Cash, (publishers) Alletrop Music, Inot Music, sixsteps Music, worshiptogether.com songs
- "The Breakup Song"
  - (writers) Bart Millard, David Garcia, Francesca Battistelli, (publishers) Bartatronic Millaphonic, D Soul Music, Francesca Music, Tunes of MercyMe, Universal Music - Brentwood Benson Publishing, Word Music LLC
- "Who You Say I Am"
  - (writers) Ben Fielding, Reuben Morgan, (publisher) Hillsong Music Publishing
- "Won't He Do It"
  - (writers) Loren Hill, Makeba Riddick-Woods, Rich Shelton, (publishers) SONGSBYMAK, Janice Combs Publishing, EMI Blackwood Music Inc., Nieze World Music, One Dynasty Music
- **"You Say"**
  - **(writers) Jason Ingram, Paul Mabury, Lauren Daigle, (publishers) CentricSongs, Fellow Ships Music, Flychild Publishing, So Essential Tunes**

Worship Song of the Year

- "Build My Life"
  - (writers) Brett Younker, Karl Martin, Kirby Kaple, Matt Redman, Pat Barrett, (publishers) Bethel Music Publishing, Capitol CMG Genesis, Housefires Sounds, Kaple Music, Martin Karl Andrew, Said And Done Music, sixsteps Music Thankyou Music worshiptogether.com songs
- "Living Hope"
  - (writers) Brian Johnson, Phil Wickham, (publishers) Bethel Music Publishing, Phil Wickham Music, Simply Global Songs, Sing My Songs
- "Surrounded (Fight My Battles)"
  - (writer) Elyssa Smith, (publisher) UR Global Publishing
- **"Who You Say I Am"**
  - **(writers) Ben Fielding, Reuben Morgan, (publisher) Hillsong Music Publishing**
- "Yes I Will"
  - (writers) Eddie Hoagland, Jonathan Smith, Mia Fieldes, (publishers) All Essential Music, Be Essential Songs, HBC Worship Music, Hickory Bill Doc, Jingram Music Publishing, So Essential Tunes, Upside Down Under

Songwriter of the Year

- **Bart Millard**
- Brian Johnson
- Lauren Daigle
- Mark Hall
- Luke Smallbone and Joel Smallbone (Team)

Songwriter of the Year (Non-artist)

- Ben Glover
- David Garcia
- Ethan Hulse
- **Jason Ingram**
- Paul Mabury

Contemporary Christian Artist of the Year

- Hillsong UNITED, Hillsong Music / Capitol CMG
- Lauren Daigle, Centricity
- Tauren Wells, Provident Music Group
- **TobyMac, Forefront / Capitol CMG**
- Zach Williams, Provident Label Group

Southern Gospel Artist of the Year

- Ernie Haase & Signature Sound, Stowtown
- **Gaither Vocal Band, Gaither Music Group**
- Jason Crabb, Daywind Records
- Joseph Habedank, Daywind Records
- Karen Peck & New River, Daywind Records

Gospel Artist of the Year

- Jekalyn Carr, Lunjeal Music Group
- **Kirk Franklin, Fo Yo Soul Recordings / RCA Records**
- Koryn Hawthorne, RCA Inspiration
- Tasha Cobbs Leonard, Motown Gospel
- Travis Greene, RCA Inspiration

Artist of the Year

- For King & Country, Curb / Word Entertainment
- Hillsong United, Hillsong Music / Capital CMG
- **Lauren Daigle, Centricity**
- MercyMe, Fair Trade
- TobyMac, ForeFront / Capitol CMG

New Artist of the Year

- **Aaron Cole, Gotee Records**
- Austin French, Fair Trade
- Josh Baldwin, Bethel Music
- Kelontae Gavin, MBE / Tyscot
- Riley Clemmons, Sparrow Records / Capitol CMG

Producer of the Year

- Chris Mackey
- Dana Sorey
- Ed Cash
- Wayne Haun
- **Jason Ingram and Paul Mabury (Team)**
- Matt Hales, Seth Mosley, and Tedd T. (Team)

=== Rap/Hip Hop ===
Rap/Hip Hop Recorded Song of the Year

- "None of My Business" – Andy Mineo
  - (writer) Andy Mineo
- **"Fight for Me" – GAWVI**
  - **(writers) Gabriel Azucena, J. Raul Garcia, Matt Cohen, Lecrae Moore**
- "Get Back Right" – Lecrae & Zaytoven
  - (writers) Bobby Pressley, Che Olson, Lecrae Moore, Xavier Dotson
- "Everytime" – Social Club Misfits
  - (writers) Daniel Young Kim, Fernando Miranda, Martin Santiago
- "Even Louder (featuring Natalie Grant)" – Steven Malcolm
  - (writers) Benji Cowart, Jonathan Jay, Joseph Prielozny, Kenneth Mackey, Leeland Mooring, Matt Armstrong, Steven Malcolm, Tony Brown, William Reeves

Rap/Hip Hop Album of the Year

- II: The Sword – Andy Mineo
  - (producers) Andy Mineo, Chad Gardner, Daniel Steele, Dave James, Lasanna "Ace" Harris, GSP, Vikaden
- Panorama – GAWVI
  - (producers) Enzo Gran, Epikh Pro, GAWVI, Jonatan Barahona, Justin Barahona, Lasanna "Ace" Harris, Matt Cohen
- **Let the Trap Say Amen – Lecrae & Zaytoven**
  - **(producer) Zaytoven**
- The Second City – Steven Malcolm
  - (producers) Chris "Dirty Rice" Mackey, Joseph Prielozny, JuiceBangers
- Never Fold – Tedashii
  - (producers) Chris Howland, Chris King, Daramola, Derek Minor, Desmond South, Evan Ford, Gavin George, Iggy Music, Jacob Cardec, Jimi Cravity, Jordan Sapp, Lasanna "ACE" Harris, Mashell Leroy, Sean Hamilton, Sean Minor, Shama "Sak Pase" Joseph, Steve "Pompano Puff" Tirogene, Tedashii Anderson, Tee Wyla, Zach Paradis

=== Rock/Contemporary ===
Rock/Contemporary Recorded Song of the Year

- **"Wildfire" – Crowder**
  - **(writers) David Crowder, Rebecca Lauren Olds, Solomon Olds**
- "Forever On Your Side (featuring JOHNNYSWIM)" – NEEDTOBREATHE
  - (writers) Bo Rinehart, Bear Rinehart
- "Native Tongue" – Switchfoot
  - (writers) Brent Kutzle, Jon Foreman, Tim Foreman

Rock/Contemporary Album of the Year

- Peace – Demon Hunter
  - (producer) Jeremiah Scott
- Acoustic Live Vol 1 – NEEDTOBREATHE
  - (producers) Bo Rinehart, Bear Rinehart
- **Native Tongue – Switchfoot**
  - **(producers) Brent Kutzle, Jon Foreman, Tim Foreman, Tyler Chester, Tyler Spry**

=== Pop/Contemporary ===
Pop/Contemporary Recorded Song of the Year

- "Only Jesus" – Casting Crowns
  - (writers) Bernie Herms, Mark Hall, Matthew West
- **"God Only Knows" – For King & Country**
  - **(writers) Joel Smallbone, Jordan Reynolds, Josh Kerr, Luke Smallbone, Tedd Tjornhom**
- "The Breakup Song" – Francesca Battisteli
  - (writers) Bart Millard, David Garcia, Francesca Battistelli
- "You Say" – Lauren Daigle
  - (writers) Jason Ingram, Lauren Daigle, Paul Mabury
- "Known" – Tauren Wells
  - (writers) Ethan Hulse, Jordan Sapp, Tauren Wells

Pop/Contemporary Album of the Year

- Only Jesus – Casting Crowns
  - (producer) Mark A. Miller
- I Know a Ghost – Crowder
  - (producers) Brendon Coe, David Crowder, Ed Cash, Hank Bentley, Solomon Olds, Tommee Profitt
- Burn the Ships – For King & Country
  - (producers) Joel Smallbone, Luke Smallbone, Matt Hales, Seth Mosley, Tedd Tjornhom
- **Look Up Child – Lauren Daigle**
  - **(producers) Jason Ingram, Paul Mabury**
- The Elements – TobyMac
  - (producers) Bryan Fowler, Cole Walowac, Dave Lubben, David Garcia, Micah Kuiper, Tim Myers, Toby McKeehan, Tommee Profitt

=== Inspirational ===
Inspirational Recorded Song of the Year

- "Is He Worthy?" – Andrew Peterson
- (writers) Andrew Peterson, Ben Shive
- "Fall on Your Knees (featuring Charlotte Ritchie)" – David Phelps
  - (writer) David Phelps
- "The God Who Sees" – Nicole C. Mullen, Kathie Lee Gifford
  - (writers) Kathie Lee Gifford, Nicole C. Mullen
- "Glory to Glory" – Riley Harrison Clark
  - (writers) Jeff Bumgardner, Joel Lindsey, Riley Harrison Clark
- **"When The Healing Comes" – TaRanda Greene**
  - **(writers) Geron Davis, Joel Lindsey, TaRanda Beene, Wayne Haun**

Inspirational Album of the Year

- **The North Coast Sessions – Keith & Kristyn Getty**
  - **(producers) Fionán de Barra, Keith Getty, Kristyn Getty**
- Follow – Mark Schultz
  - (producer) Chris Bevins, Tedd T
- The Healing – TaRanda Greene
  - (producers) Carol Cymbala, Bradley Knight, Jason Webb, Jim Hammerly, Keith Everette Smith, Taranda Beene, Virgil Straford, Wayne Haun

=== Southern Gospel ===
Southern Gospel Recorded Song of the Year

- "Longing For Home" – Ernie Haase & Signature Sound
  - (writers) Ernie Haase, Joel Lindsey, Wayne Haun
- "We Are All God's Children" – Gaither Vocal Band
  - (writers) Benjamin Gaither, Sara Beth Terry, Todd Suttles
- "How Great Thou Art (featuring Sonya Isaacs)" – Josh Turner
  - (writer) Stuart K. Hine
- **"I Know I'll Be There" – Karen Peck & New River**
  - **(writers) Dave Clark, Karen Peck Gooch, Wayne Haun**
- "Even Me" – Triumphant Quartet
  - (writers) Jason Cox, Jeff Bumgardner, Kenna Turner West

Southern Gospel Album of the Year

- Mercy & Love – Collingsworth Family
  - (producers) David Clydesdale, Wayne Haun
- Life Is A Song – Greater Vision
  - (producer) Gerald Wolfe
- Ready For Revival – Guardians
  - (producers) John Daril Rowsey, Wayne Haun
- Deeper Oceans – Joseph Habedank
  - (producer) Wayne Haun
- **Yes – Triumphant Quartet**
  - **(producers) Gordon Mote, Wayne Haun**

=== Bluegrass/Country/Roots ===
Bluegrass/Country/Roots Recorded Song of the Year

- "Beside The Cross" – Lizzy Long, Rhonda Vincent, & Sally Berry
  - (writers) Fanny Crosby, Jeff Bumgardner, Joel Lindsey, Wayne Haun
- "Wayfaring Stranger" – Jeff & Sheri Easter
  - (writer) Traditional
- "Shame On Me" – Joseph Habedank
  - (writers) Jason Cox, Joseph Habedank, Michael Boggs
- **"I Saw the Light (featuring Sonya Isaacs)" – Josh Turner**
  - **(writer) Hank Williams Sr.**
- "Dive (featuring Ricky Skaggs)" – Steven Curtis Chapman
  - (writer) Steven Curtis Chapman

Bluegrass/Country/Roots Album of the Year

- I Serve a Savior – Josh Turner
  - (producer) Kenny Greenberg
- **Deeper Roots: Where the Bluegrass Grows – Steven Curtis Chapman**
  - **(producers) Brent Milligan, Steven Curtis Chapman**
- Favorites: Revisited by Request – The Isaacs
  - (producers) Ben Isaacs, The Isaacs

=== Contemporary Gospel/Urban ===
Contemporary Gospel/Urban Recorded Song of the Year

- "Blessings On Blessings" – Anthony Brown & Group therAPy
  - (writer) Anthony Brown
- "Make Room" – Jonathan McReynolds
  - (writer) Jonathan McReynolds
- **"Love Theory" – Kirk Franklin**
  - **(writer) Kirk Franklin**
- "Unstoppable" – Koryn Hawthorne
  - (writers) Kid Class, Makeba Riddick, Robert D. Reese
- "My God (featuring Mr. Talkbox)" – Nashville Life Music
  - (writer) Dwan Hill

Contemporary Gospel/Urban Album of the Year

- Road to DeMaskUs – Israel Houghton
  - (producers) Israel Houghton, Matt Edwards
- The Answer – Jason Nelson
  - (producers) Aaron Nelson, Dana Sorey, Eric Dawkins, Jason Nelson, Jonathan Nelson, Kenny Shelton
- Declarations – Jonathan Nelson
  - (producers) Kenneth Shelton, Jonathan Nelson
- **Unstoppable – Koryn Hawthorne**
  - **(producers) Bernie Herms, Joaquin Bynum, Johnta Austin, Kc Knight, Kid Class, Makeba Riddick-Woods, One Up Entertainment, Robert Reese, Troy Taylor, Vaughan Phoenix, Warryn Campbell, Xeryus Gittens**
- Hiding Place – Tori Kelly
  - (producers) Kirk Franklin, Max Stark, Rickey "Slikk Musik" Offord, Ronald Hill, Scooter Braun, Tori Kelly

=== Traditional Gospel ===
Traditional Gospel Recorded Song of the Year

- **"Deliver Me (This is My Exodus) (featuring Le'Andria Johnson)" – Donald Lawrence, The Tri-City Singers**
  - **(writers) Desmond Davis, Donald Lawrence, Marshon Lewis, Robert Woolridge Jr., William James Stokes**
- "I See Miracles" – Jekalyn Carr
  - (writer) Allen Carr
- "I Made It Out" – John P. Kee
  - (writer) John P. Kee
- "I'm All In" – Maranda Curtis
  - (writers) Asaph Ward, Dana Sorey, Maranda Curtis
- "Kind God" – Marvin Sapp
  - (writer) Kirk Franklin

Traditional Gospel Album of the Year

- Jesus Love Legacy – Bishop Leonard Scott
  - (producers) Phillip Feaster, Tiffany McGhee
- Open Your Mouth and Say Something – Brent Jones
  - (producers) Brent Jones, Eddie Brown, Professor James Roberson
- **Goshen – Donald Lawrence, The Tri-City Singers**
  - **(producers) Donald Lawrence, Sir The Baptist, Troy Taylor**
- This Song Is For You – Earl Bynum
  - (producer) Earl Bynum
- Stand There – The Wardlaw Brothers
  - (producer) Martin Luther Wardlaw

=== Gospel Worship ===
Gospel Worship Recorded Song of the Year

- "If God / Nothing But the Blood" – Casey J
  - (writers) Casey J, Natalie Sims, Jon Webb Jr.
- "My Worship" – Phil Thompson
  - (writers) Phil Thompson, Zenzo Matoga
- **"This Is A Move (Live)" – Tasha Cobbs Leonard**
  - **(writers) Brandon Lake, Nate Moore, Tasha Cobbs Leonard, Tony Brown**
- "You're Doing It All Again" – Todd Dulaney
  - (writers) Nicole Harris, Todd Dulaney
- "Settle Here (Part 1)" – William Murphy
  - (writer) William Murphy

Gospel Worship Album of the Year

- **Heart. Passion. Pursuit. (Live) – Tasha Cobbs Leonard**
  - **(producers) Kenneth Leonard Jr., Monica Coates**
- To Africa With Love – Todd Dulaney
  - (producer) Todd Dulaney
- Settle Here – William Murphy
  - (producers) Kenneth Leonard, Tasha Cobbs Leonard

=== Spanish ===
Spanish Language Recorded Song of the Year

- "Mi GPS" – Alex Zurdo
  - (writer) Alexis "Alex Zurdo" Velez
- "Dios De Maravillas" – Christine D'Clario
  - (writer) Edward Rivera, Jose Olide, Paul Pineda
- "Mi Casa Es Tu Casa" – Evan Craft
- (writers) Abraham Osorio, Alex Sampedro, Evan Craft
- **"Tus Cuerdas De Amor (featuring Lowsan Melgar)" – Julio Melgar**
  - **(writer) Julio Melgar**
- "Salmo 23 (featuring Marco Barrientos)" – Un Corazón
  - (writers) Lluvia Richards, Steven Daniel Richards

Spanish Album of the Year

- **¿Quién contra nosotros? – Alex Zurdo**
  - **(producer) Alex Zurdo**
- Tu Primero – Andy Alemany, (producers) Ivan Ruiz, Samuel Ash
- Emanuel – Christine D'Clario
  - (producers) Carlos Caban, Christine D'Clario, José Olide, Paul Pineda
- A Partir De Hoy – Rojo
  - (producers) Eliseo Tapia, Emmanuel Espinosa
- Hola, Futuro – Un Corazón
  - (producer) Steven Richards

=== Worship ===
Worship Recorded Song of the Year

- "Raise a Hallelujah" – Bethel Music, Jonathan David Helser, Melissa Helser
  - (writers) Jake Stevens, Jonathan David Helser, Melissa Helser, Molly Skaggs
- "Who You Say I Am (Studio Version)" – Hillsong Worship
  - (writers) Ben Fielding, Reuben Morgan
- "Stand in Your Love" – Josh Baldwin
  - (writers) Ethan Hulse, Josh Baldwin, Mark Harris, Rita Springer
- "Build My Life" – Pat Barrett
  - (writers) Brett Younker, Karl Martin, Kirby Kaple, Matt Redman, Pat Barrett
- **"Living Hope" – Phil Wickham**
  - **(writers) Brian Johnson, Phil Wickham**

Worship Album of the Year

- Victory – Bethel Music
  - (producer) Ed Cash
- Holy Roar – Chris Tomlin
  - (producers) Bryan Fowler, Ed Cash
- Hallelujah Here Below – Elevation Worship
  - (producer) Elevation Worship
- **PEOPLE – Hillsong UNITED**
  - **(producers) Michael Guy Chislett, Joel Houston**
- Living Hope – Phil Wickham
  - (producers) Ed Cash, Jonathan Smith, Nicolas Balachandran, Pete Kipley, Ran Jackson, Ricky Jackson

=== Other categories ===
Instrumental Album of the Year

- Rise! – Ben Tankard
  - (producer) Ben Tankard
- Front Porch Pickin': Old Time Gospel Favorites – Kevin Williams
  - (producer) Kevin Williams
- **Christmas – Paul Cardall**
  - **(producer) Jim Daneker**

Children's Album of the Year

- **Bright Ones (Soundtrack) – Bright Ones**
  - **(producers) Jacob Sooter, James Morales, Jeff Schneeweis, Mike "X" O' Connor, Rick Seibold, Seth Mosley**
- Sing: Creation Songs – Ellie Holcomb
  - (producers) Ben Shive, Brown Bannister, Nathan Dugger
- Lullaby – Michael W. Smith
  - (producers) Mike Nawrocki, Tyler Michael Smith

Christmas / Special Event Album of the Year

- Something's Happening! – Cece Winans
  - (producer) Alvin Love III
- It Must Be Christmas – David Phelps
  - (producer) David Phelps
- The Advent of Christmas – Matt Maher
  - (producers) Matt Maher, Mitch Parks

Musical of the Year

- Come and See, Go and Tell
  - (creators) Lee Black, Jason Cox, (arranger & orchestrator) Marty Hamby
- Jesus, Only King Forever
  - (creators) Jason Cox, Cliff Duren, Camp Kirkland, Phil Nitz
- Take Me Back To Bethlehem
  - (creators) Sue C. Smith, Mason Brown, (arrangers) Mason Brown, Russell Mauldin
- **Welcome to Bethlehem**
  - **(creators) Joel Lindsey, Jeff Bumgardner, Heidi Petak, (arranger & orchestrator) Daniel Semsen**
- While the World Was Waiting
  - (creators) Marty Funderburk, Mike Harland, Cliff Duren, Phillip Keveren, Phil Nitz

Youth / Children's Musical of the Year

- Random Acts of Christmas
  - (creators) Nick Robertson, Anna Lampe, Alisen Wells
- **Straight Outta Bethlehem**
  - **(creator) Christy Semsen, (arranger) Daniel Semsen**
- The Name of Jesus
  - (creators) Dale Mathews, Dana Anderson

Choral Collection of the Year

- Prince of Heaven
  - (creator) Travis Cottrell
- **The Great American Church Songbook**
  - **(arranger & orchestrator) Cliff Duren**
- The Worship of Christmas
  - (creators) Phil Barfoot, Bradley Knight

Recorded Music Packaging of the Year

- Victory – Bethel Music
  - (art director) Stephen James Hart, (graphic designer) Stephen James Hart, (photographers) Rachel Soh, Jordana Griffith
- **The Wait – David Leonard**
  - **(art directors) David Leonard, Jason B. Jones, (graphic designer) Jordan Rubino, (photographer) Elliot Eicheldinger**
- Hallelujah Here Below – Elevation Worship
  - (art directors) Ryan Hollingsworth, Jacob Boyles, (graphic designer) Jacob Boyles, (illustrator) Tyler Deeb, (photographers) Jacob Boyles, Steven Lester
- God of the Impossible – Lincoln Brewster
  - (art director) Jason B. Jones, (graphic designer) Jordan Rubino, (photographer) Lee Steffen
- Native Tongue – Switchfoot
  - (art director) Carrie Smith, (graphic designer) Jordan Wetherbee, Tommy Steele, (photographer) Erick Frost

=== Videos and films ===
Short Form Video of the Year

- Awakening – Amanda Lindsey Cook
  - (director) Josh Hesami, (producer) Joshua Mohline
- Red Letters – Crowder
  - (director) Patrick Tohill, (producer) Patrick Tohill
- **Haven't Seen It Yet – Danny Gokey**
  - **(director) Ry Cox, (producer) Joel Hartz**
- Let Go (Live at Hillsong Conference) – Hillsong Young & Free
  - (director) Nathaniel Redekop, (producers) Johnny Rays, Laura Toggs
- Love Theory – Kirk Franklin
  - (director) Matt DeLisi, (producer) Ben Skipworth

Long Form Video of the Year

- **Only Jesus Visual Album – Casting Crowns**
  - **(director) Ashley Lollis, (producer) Kyle Lollis**
- Holy Roar: Live From Church – Chris Tomlin
  - (director) Steven Lester, (producer) Matt Reed
- The Wait (Movie) – David Leonard
  - (director) Elliot Eicheldinger, (producers) The Creak Music, Integrity Music
- People (LIVE) – Hillsong UNITED
  - (directors) Nathaniel Redekop, Richard Cause, (producers) Johnny Rays, Joel Houston
- Survivor: Live From Harding Prison – Zach Williams
  - (director) Jace Freeman, (producer) Sean Clark

Inspirational Film of the Year

- **Breakthrough**
  - **(director) Roxann Dawson, (producers) DeVon Franklin, Jessica Dunn**
- Indivisible
  - (director) David G. Evans, (producers) Darren Moorman, David G. Evans, Esther Evans
- Run the Race
  - (director) Chris Dowling, (producers) Darren Moorman, Jake McEntire, Ken Carpenter
- Unbroken: Path to Redemption
  - (director) Harold Cronk, (producers) Matt Baer, Mike Elliot
- Unplanned
  - (directors) Chuck Konzelman, Cary Solomon, (producers) Cary Solomon, Chris Jones, Chuck Konzelman, Daryl C. Lefever, Fabiano Altamura, Jason Stafford, Joe Knopp, Mark Cheatwood, Megan Harrington, Sheila Hart
