= Until My Voice Is Gone =

Live album by Travis Ryan
- Released: May 13, 2016
- Genre: Worship; Christian pop
- Length: 65:56
- Label: Integrity

Travis Ryan chronology
You Hold It All (2015)	Until My Voice Is Gone (2016)

Until My Voice Is Gone is the first live album from Travis Ryan. Integrity Music released the album on May 13, 2016.

== Critical reception ==
Professional ratings
Review scores
Source	Rating
365 Days of Inspiring Media	4/5 stars
The Christian Beat	4/5 stars
Today's Christian Entertainment	4/5 stars

Awarding the album four stars at Today's Christian Entertainment, Laura Chambers describes, "Until My Voice Is Gone instead loans us the skillful words of another, borrowed in turn from the pages of Scripture; a poignant reminder that every moment belongs to God, yet we could never have enough of them to give Him His due." Madeleine Dittmer, rating the album four stars by The Christian Beat, writes, "The tracks range from energetic praise to simple, but powerful songs of gratitude...Travis Ryan’s songs are beautiful, authentic songs of worship to add to your collection." Giving the album four stars from 365 Days of Inspiring Media, Joshua Andre states, "Well done Travis for a compelling, hard hitting, necessary and also hopeful album".

== Track listing ==
No.	Title	Length
1.	"We Believe"	4:54
2.	"Until My Voice Is Gone"	5:15
3.	"Forever Holy"	6:22
4.	"You Are Able"	7:26
5.	"You Hold It All"	6:53
6.	"Holy Spirit Come"	6:42
7.	"You Never Give Up on Me"	4:29
8.	"The Goodness of the Lord"	5:17
9.	"The Cross Was Meant for Me"	4:34
10.	"Your Love Set My Soul on Fire"	4:07
11.	"Heartbeat"	6:32
12.	"You Come Running" (Bonus Track)	3:25
Total length:		65:56

== Chart performance ==
Chart (2016)	Peak position
US Christian Albums (Billboard)	47
