= Housefires =

American Christian worship group

- Origin: Atlanta, Georgia
- Genres: Worship
- Years active: 2014–present
- Labels: Capitol Christian Music Group, Housefires Music, Tribl Records
- Members: Kirby Kaple; Ryan Ellis; Nate Moore; Davy Flowers; Tony Brown; Vicki Schmidt; Jonathan Jay “JJ”; Zac Brooks; Harold Brown; Donald Hart; Ahjah Walls; Blake Wiggins
- Past members: Pat Barrett; Josh Stewart; Jonathan Kimsey; Mark Cole; Blaine Keller
- Website: housefires.org

Housefires is an American worship band from Atlanta, Georgia. Forming in 2014, they have released five live albums.

== Background ==
Housefires originated at Grace Midtown Church in Atlanta, Georgia. The church had released two prior worship albums as Grace Midtown, with Pat Barrett and others leading. Housefires formed in 2014, with the addition of Kirby Kaple as a worship pastor at Grace, and signaled a shift in the church's musical style toward a more stripped-down style reminiscent of artists such as United Pursuit and All Sons & Daughters. Barrett and Kaple were joined by fellow Atlanta worship leader Tony Brown, and Grace Athens worship pastor Nate Moore. Additional members included violinist Vicki Schmidt, keyboardist Jonathan Jay, percussionist, Zac Brooks, and drummer Harold Brown. In 2016, the band also participated in the Outcry Tour, and continued touring independently in 2017. They often host monthly worship nights at Grace Midtown's campus. On February 1, 2020, Donald Hart joined Housefires as their bassist.

== Music history ==
The band has released four live albums. Their eponymous debut was released on March 19, 2014, with most songs reappearing in more polished form on Housefires II, released September 9, 2014. Housefires III followed on August 12, 2016, and their most recent album, We Say Yes, was released in mid-2017. The group is best known for Barrett and Brown's "Good Good Father," which attained massive popularity after Chris Tomlin recorded the song and released it as a single. Their album, Housefires III, charted on three Billboard magazine charts, The Billboard 200 at No. 106, Christian Albums at No. 3, and Independent Albums at No. 6. It also charted on the Official Charts Company from the United Kingdom on their Official Christian & Gospel Albums Chart, at No. 2.

== Members ==
=== Current members ===
- Tony Brown – vocals, guitar (co-founder)
- Nate Moore – vocals, guitar
- Kirby Kaple – vocals
- Ryan Ellis – vocals, guitar
- Davy Flowers – vocals
- Ahjah Walls - vocals
- Vicki Schmidt – violin
- Jonathan Jay – keys
- Zac Brooks – percussion
- Harold Brown – drums (Formerly of Maverick City Music)
- Donald Hart – bass

=== Former members ===
- Pat Barrett – vocals, guitar
- Josh Stewart – keys
- Jonathan Kimsey – drums
- Mark Cole – guitar
- Blaine Keller – violin

== Discography ==
=== Albums ===
List of live albums, with selected chart positions
Title	Album details	Peak chart positions				
Title	Album details	US	US Christ.	US Heat.	US Ind.	UK C&G
Housefires	Released: March 19, 2014; Label: Housefires; Formats: CD, digital download	—	—	—	—	—
Housefires II	Released: September 9, 2014; Label: Housefires; Formats: CD, digital download	—	30	23	—	10
Housefires III	Released: August 12, 2016; Label: Housefires; Formats: CD, digital download	106	3	—	6	2
We Say Yes	Released: June 2, 2017; Label: Housefires; Formats: CD, digital download	—	6	—	23	4
Housefires V	Released: July 12, 2019; Label: Housefires; Formats: CD, digital download	—	37	—	—	9
Housefires VII	Released: June 25, 2021; Label: Capitol CMG/Bower & Bow; Formats: CD, digital download	—	—	—	—	—
How To Start A Housefire	Released: January 27, 2023; Label: Capitol CMG/Tribl Records	—	—	—	—	—
How To Start A Housefire, Pt. II	Released: April 21, 2023; Label: Capitol CMG/Tribl Records	—	—	—	—	—
How To Start A Housefire, Pt. III	Released: November 3, 2023; Label: Capitol CMG/Tribl Records	—	—	—	—	—
Chapel Sessions, Vol I	Released: October 24, 2024	-	-	-	-	-

=== Extended plays ===
List of extended plays, with selected chart positions
Title	Album details
Housefires + Friends (Live)	Released: May 1, 2020; Label: Housefires; Formats: CD, digital download

=== Singles ===
Year	Single	Chart positions	Album
Year	Single	US Christ	Album
2015	"Good Good Father"	29	Housefires II
2016	"Build My Life"	42	Housefires III
2019	"I'll Give Thanks" (featuring Kirby Kaple)	50	Housefires V
