= Good Good Father =

Single by Chris Tomlin

from the album Never Lose Sight
- Released: October 2, 2015
- Genre: Contemporary worship, CCM
- Length: 4:52
- Label: sixsteps
- Songwriters: Tony Brown, Pat Barrett
- Producers: Ed Cash, Jeremy Edwardson, Ross Copperman

Chris Tomlin singles chronology
"At the Cross (Love Ran Red)" (2015)	"Good Good Father" (2015)	"Jesus" (2016)

Music video
- "Good Good Father" on YouTube

"Good Good Father" is a song performed by Christian contemporary Christian-modern worship musician Chris Tomlin. It was released as the lead single from his 2016 album, Never Lose Sight, on October 2, 2015. The song is a cover of Housefires's "Good Good Father". The song became Tomlin's sixth Hot Christian Songs No. 1. The track held the No. 1 position for seven weeks.

It won the Dove Award for Song of the Year in 2016.

== Background ==
"Good Good Father" was released on October 2, 2015, as the lead single for Tomlin's eleventh studio album, Never Lose Sight. The song is a cover of Housefires's "Good Good Father", which gained popularity shortly after Tomlin's version was released. The song is about how good God has been to him throughout his life. It topped the Billboard Christian Airplay, scoring his eighth Airplay number-one. The feat ties him with Jeremy Camp for the most No. 1s as a soloist. The song also won the GMA Song of the Year award in 2016. Despite its success, the song has been criticized for being "not identifiably Christian, completely narcissistic, and poor poetry."

== Music video ==
The music video for the single "Good Good Father" was released on February 18, 2016. One of the song's writers, Pat Barrett, makes a guest appearance in the visual.

== Track listing ==
- Digital download
1. "Good Good Father" – 4:57
- Digital download (featuring Pat Barrett)
1. "Good Good Father" – 4:20

== Charts ==
=== Weekly charts ===
Chart (2015–16)	Peak position
US Bubbling Under Hot 100 (Billboard)	13
US Christian Airplay (Billboard)	1
US Hot Christian Songs (Billboard)	1
US Christian AC Songs (Billboard)	5
US Christian AC Indicator (Billboard)	1

=== Year-end charts ===
Chart (2015)	Peak position
US Christian Songs (Billboard)	42
Chart (2016)	Peak position
US Christian Songs (Billboard)	3
US Christian Airplay (Billboard)	12
US Christian AC (Billboard)	15

=== Decade-end charts ===
Chart (2010s)	Position
US Christian Songs (Billboard)	22

== Certifications ==
Region	Certification	Certified units/sales
New Zealand (RMNZ)	Platinum	30,000^{‡}
United States (RIAA)	2× Platinum	2,000,000^{‡}
^{‡} Sales+streaming figures based on certification alone.
