= Travis Ryan (musician) =

American Christian musician

- Born: Travis Ryan Collins; August 3, 1983 (age 43); San Clemente, California
- Genres: Contemporary Christian music, worship
- Occupations: Singer, songwriter
- Instruments: Vocals, guitar
- Years active: 2012–present
- Labels: Integrity, Columbia
- Website: travisryanmusic.com

Travis Ryan Collins (born August 3, 1983), who goes by the stage name Travis Ryan, is an American Christian musician. He released a studio album in 2012, Fearless, with Integrity Music. He is most known for co-writing "We Believe" with Richie Fike, Matt Hooper. The song was popularized by the Christian band Newsboys.

== Early life ==
Collins was born as Travis Ryan Collins, in San Clemente, California on August 3, 1983, to a songwriter and worship leader father. Collins was an associate producer for Maranatha! Music. He later became a worship leader at Saddleback Church, then at LifePoint Church in Smyrna, Tennessee.

== Career ==
He started his music recording career in 2012, with his first studio album, Fearless, and it released on April 10, 2012, from Integrity Music.

Integrity Music released two of his musical compositions on May 13, 2016: Heartbeat, his third EP, and Until My Voice Is Gone, his first live album.

In 2019, Phil Wickham released his album Living Hope, for which Ryan co-wrote the song "My All in All."

== Personal life ==
Travis Ryan Collins is married to Hayley, where together they have five children, three sons and two daughters.

== Discography ==
=== Albums ===
- Travis Ryan (March 10, 2009 - Independent)
- Fearless (April 10, 2012, Integrity Music)

Live albums

- Until My Voice Is Gone (May 13, 2016, Integrity)

=== EPs ===
- Travis Ryan (July 23, 2008, Independent)
- You Hold It All (August 28, 2015, Integrity)
- Heartbeat (May 13, 2016, Integrity)

=== Songs ===
- "We Believe"
