= Pat Barrett (musician) =

American contemporary worship musician

- Born: Patrick Barrett; Atlanta, Georgia, US
- Genre: Contemporary worship music
- Occupations: Singer; songwriter; worship pastor
- Instruments: Vocals; guitar
- Years active: 2005–present
- Labels: Bowyer & Bow; Sparrow; Capitol CMG
- Member of: Sons of Sunday
- Formerly of: Unhindered; Housefires
- Website: Official website

Patrick Barrett is an American Christian worship singer, and songwriter. He is a former member of American contemporary worship bands Unhindered and Housefires.

In 2018, Barrett signed a record deal with Bowyer & Bow, launching his solo career with the release of his eponymous debut studio album, containing the singles "The Way (New Horizon)", "Build My Life" and "Better", which debuted at number 22 on the Billboard Top Christian Albums chart in the United States. Barrett was nominated for the GMA Dove Award for New Artist of the Year at the 2018 GMA Dove Awards, while "Build My Life" received two nominations for the GMA Dove Award for Worship Song of the Year and Worship Recorded Song of the Year at the 2019 GMA Dove Awards.

In 2021, Barrett released his second studio album, Act Justly, Love Mercy, Walk Humbly, which debuted at number 30 on the Billboard Top Christian Albums chart.

== Career ==
On March 19, 2018, Chris Tomlin announced that Pat Barrett would be the first artist signed to Bowyer & Bow his new imprint with Capitol Christian Music Group. On March 30, 2018, Pat Barrett released his eponymous debut extended play and announced that his debut studio album was slated for release later in the year. "The Way (New Horizon)" impacted Christian radio in the United States as Barrett's debut single on May 4, 2018. "The Way (New Horizon)" peaked at number 12 on the Hot Christian Songs chart. Barrett released his self-titled studio album on July 20, 2018. Pat Barrett peaked at number 22 on the Top Christian Albums chart. Barrett released "Sails" featuring Steffany Gretzinger and Amanda Cook as the second single from Pat Barrett (2018) on September 26, 2018. On December 21, 2018, Barrett released "Build My Life" as the third single from his self-titled studio album. "Build My Life" peaked at number four on the Hot Christian Songs chart. "Build My Life" received two nominations for the GMA Dove Award for Worship Song of the Year and Worship Recorded Song of the Year at the 2019 GMA Dove Awards. On August 23, 2019, Barrett released his first live album, Canvas and Clay. Barrett released "Better" as the fourth single from his self-titled debut studio album in August 2019. "Better" peaked at number 16 on the Hot Christian Songs chart. On January 21, 2020, Pat Barrett announced that he would embark on the Build My Life Worship Nights Tour spanning eleven dates across cities in the United States.

On March 6, 2020, Barrett "Canvas and Clay" as a single. "Canvas and Clay" peaked at number 38 on the Hot Christian Songs chart. On May 22, 2020, Barrett released "No Weapon" as a single. On June 19, 2020, Barrett released "Lightning" with Harolddd as a single. On September 25, 2020, Barrett released "Heavenly" as a single. On January 22, 2021, Barrett announced that the release of his second studio album, Act Justly, Love Mercy, Walk Humbly, was slated for February 26, 2021, containing the singles "Canvas and Clay," "No Weapon," "Lightning," and "Heavenly," while the title track was availed for pre-order and set to impact Christian radio on March 19, 2021. Act Justly, Love Mercy, Walk Humbly was released on February 26, 2021. Act Justly, Love Mercy, Walk Humbly debuted at number 30 on the Top Christian Albums chart in the United States. The title track, "Act Justly, Love Mercy, Walk Humbly," peaked at number 47 on the Hot Christian Songs chart.

On June 4, 2021, Barrett released a live extended play titled Nothing/Something. On June 21, 2021, Barrett announced that he will embark on his second headline tour, dubbed the Act Justly, Love Mercy, Walk Humbly Worship Nights Tour in September, spanning cities in the United States. On February 11, 2022, Barrett released "Morning By Morning (I Will Trust)" as the sixth single from Act Justly, Love Mercy, Walk Humbly (2021). "Morning By Morning (I Will Trust)" peaked at number 42 on the Hot Christian Songs chart. Barrett featured on the promotional single "This Is the Kingdom" by Elevation Worship, which was released on February 18, 2022. "This Is the Kingdom" peaked at number 27 on the Hot Christian Songs chart. On April 22, 2022, Barrett was featured on a tenth anniversary version of "10,000 Reasons (Bless the Lord)" by Worship Together alongside Matt Redman, Bryan & Katie Torwalt, Naomi Raine, and Crowder.

== Discography ==
- Pat Barrett (2018)
- Act Justly, Love Mercy, Walk Humbly (2021)
- Shelter (2023)
- I've Got a Fire (2025)

== Bibliography ==
- Tomlin, Chris; Barrett, Pat (October 4, 2016). Good Good Father. Thomas Nelson. ISBN 978-0718086954.

== Tours ==
Headlining

- Build My Life Worship Nights Tour (2020)
- Act Justly, Love Mercy, Walk Humbly – Worship Nights Tour (2021)
- Acoustic Nights Tour (2023)
- Beautiful Life Tour (2024)

Supporting

- Holy Roar Tour with Chris Tomlin (2019)
- Singalong Tour with Phil Wickham and Brandon Lake (2021)
- Tomlin UNITED Tour with Chris Tomlin and Hillsong United (2022)
- I Believe Tour with Phil Wickham and Benjamin William Hastings (2024)
- Holy Forever World Tour with Chris Tomlin (2024)
- King of Hearts Tour with Brandon Lake (2025)

== Awards and nominations ==
=== GMA Dove Awards ===
Year	Nominee / work	Award	Result	Ref.
2016	"Good Good Father" (Note: Barrett is credited as a co-writer of "Good Good Father" performed by Chris Tomlin.) (Chris Tomlin)	Song of the Year	Won	
2016	"Good Good Father" (Chris Tomlin)	Pop/Contemporary Recorded Song of the Year	Nominated	
2016	"Good Good Father" (Chris Tomlin)	Worship Song of the Year	Nominated	
2017	"Joy" (Note: Barrett is credited as a co-writer of "Joy" performed by VaShawn Mitchell.)	Urban Worship Recorded Song of the Year	Won	
2018	Pat Barrett	New Artist of the Year	Nominated	
2019	"Build My Life"	Worship Song of the Year	Nominated	
2019	"Build My Life"	Worship Recorded Song of the Year	Nominated	
2023	"Same God" (Note: Barrett is credited as a co-writer of "Same God" performed by Elevation Worship.) (Elevation Worship)	Song of the Year	Nominated	
2023	"This Is Our God" (Note: Barrett was credited as a co-writer on "This Is Our God" by Phil Wickham.) (Phil Wickham)	Worship Recorded Song of the Year	Nominated	
2026	"I've Got a Fire"	Short Form Music Video of the Year (Concept)	Pending	

=== We Love Awards ===
Year	Nominee / work	Award	Result	Ref.
2025	"Praise the Lord Forever"	Worship Song of the Year	Nominated	
