= God Really Loves Us =

2022 single by Crowder and Dante Bowe

Single by Crowder and Dante Bowe featuring Maverick City Music

from the album Milk & Honey
- Released: June 3, 2022
- Genre: Worship
- Length: 4:21
- Label: Sparrow; Capitol CMG
- Songwriters: Ben Glover; David Crowder; Dante Bowe; Jeff Sojka
- Producers: Ben Glover; Jeff Sojka

Crowder singles chronology
"O Holy Night" (2021)	"God Really Loves Us" (2022)	"Grave Robber" (2024)

Dante Bowe singles chronology
"Nail Scarred Hands" (2022)	"God Really Loves Us" (2022)	"Hide Me" (2023)

Maverick City Music singles chronology
"Worthy of My Song (Worthy of It All)" (2022)	"God Really Loves Us" (2022)	"Fear Is Not My Future" (2022)

Music videos
- "God Really Loves Us" on YouTube
- "God Really Loves Us" (Lyrics) on YouTube

"God Really Loves Us" is a song performed by Crowder and Dante Bowe featuring Maverick City Music. It was released on June 3, 2022, as the third single from Crowder's fourth studio album, Milk & Honey (2021). Crowder co-wrote the song with Ben Glover, Dante Bowe, and Jeff Sojka.

"God Really Loves Us" peaked at No. 3 on the US Hot Christian Songs chart, and No. 1 on the Hot Gospel Songs chart. The song was nominated for the Grammy Award for Best Contemporary Christian Music Performance/Song at the 2023 Grammy Awards. At the 2023 GMA Dove Awards, "God Really Loves Us" was nominated for the Song of the Year award.

== Background ==
"God Really Loves Us" was initially released as the seventh track on Crowder's album, Milk & Honey, on June 11, 2021. On June 3, 2022, Crowder and Dante Bowe released the radio version of "God Really Loves Us" on digital formats, becoming the third single from the album, following "Good God Almighty" and "In the House".

== Composition ==
"God Really Loves Us" is composed in the key of B with a tempo of 83.5 beats per minute and a musical time signature of 6/8.

== Reception ==
=== Critical response ===
Timothy Yap of JubileeCast said of the song: "One of the soon-to-be-classic-worship-tune is the sublime "God Really Loves Us." Teaming up with Dante Bowe and Maverick City Music, "God Really Loves Us" begins softly before exploding into a dynamic full-Gospel-choir celebration." Reviewing for Jesus Freak Hideout, John Underdown explicitly listed "God Really Loves Us" as one of the songs from Milk & Honey which were earworms and had lyrics with some powerful moments. Kelly Meade of Today's Christian Entertainment opined that "This ballad stands out with its emotionally moving piano arrangement & choir-like backing vocals."

=== Awards and nominations ===
Awards
Year	Organization	Award	Result	Ref
2023	Grammy Awards	Best Contemporary Christian Music Performance/Song	Nominated	
2023	GMA Dove Awards	Song of the Year	Nominated	

== Commercial performance ==
Following the album's release, "God Really Loves Us" debuted at No. 11 on the US Gospel Digital Song Sales chart dated June 26, 2021. "God Really Loves Us" made its debut at No. 45 on the US Christian Airplay chart dated June 25, 2022. After being released to Christian radio, "God Really Loves Us" debuted at No. 46 on the US Hot Christian Songs chart, and No. 25 on the Hot Gospel Songs chart, dated July 9, 2022.

== Music videos ==
On June 11, 2021, Crowder released the lyric video for "God Really Loves Us" through YouTube. On June 3, 2022, Crowder released the audio video for the radio version of the song via YouTube.

On August 12, 2022, Crowder published the official music video for "God Really Loves Us" with Dante Bowe featuring Maverick City Music on YouTube. The music video, directed by Patrick Tohill, was filmed on a rooftop in downtown Atlanta as the three acts performed the song at sunset.

== Charts ==
=== Weekly charts ===
Weekly chart performance for "God Really Loves Us"
Chart (2021–2023)	Peak position
US Hot Christian Songs (Billboard)	3
US Christian Airplay (Billboard)	3
US Christian AC (Billboard)	4
US Gospel Songs (Billboard)	1

=== Year-end charts ===
Year-end chart performance for "God Really Loves Us"
Chart (2022)	Position
US Christian Songs (Billboard)	71
US Gospel Songs (Billboard)	23
Chart (2023)	Position
US Christian Songs (Billboard)	26
US Christian Airplay (Billboard)	13
US Christian AC (Billboard)	17
US Gospel Songs (Billboard)	3

== Certifications ==
Region	Certification	Certified units/sales
United States (RIAA)	Gold	500,000^{‡}
^{‡} Sales+streaming figures based on certification alone.

== Release history ==
Release dates and formats for "God Really Loves Us"
Region	Date	Format	Label	Ref.
Various	June 3, 2022	Digital download; streaming	Sparrow; Capitol CMG	
United States	June 17, 2022	Christian radio	Sparrow; Capitol CMG	

== Other versions ==
- Passion released a version of the song featuring Crowder and Chidima on their live album, Burn Bright (2022).
