= Night Like This =

Night Like This may refer to:

- "Night Like This" (Crowder song), 2020
- "Night Like This", a song by Shawn Desman from the album Fresh
- "Night Like This", a song by Hilary Duff from the album Breathe In. Breathe Out.
- "Night Like This", a song by LP from the album Forever for Now

== See also ==
- Nights Like This (disambiguation)
- A Night Like This (disambiguation)
