= Hands of Love =

Hands of Love may refer to:

- "Hands of Love", an award-winning episode from American television series The Man and the City
- "Hands of Love", one in a medley of songs by Paul McCartney and Wings from Red Rose Speedway
- "Hands of Love", a song by Wall of Voodoo from Call of the West
- "Hands of Love", a song by Crowder from Neon Steeple
- "Hands of Love", a song by Miley Cyrus from Freeheld Original Motion Picture
