= Neon Porch Extravaganza =

EP by Crowder
- Released: October 30, 2015
- Genres: Worship, contemporary Christian music, folk
- Length: 25:49
- Labels: Sixsteps, Sparrow

Crowder chronology
Neon Steeple (2014)	Neon Porch Extravaganza (2015)	American Prodigal (2016)

Neon Porch Extravaganza is an extended play by Crowder, recorded live and released by sixstepsrecords and Sparrow Records on October 30, 2015.

== Critical reception ==
Professional ratings
Review scores
Source	Rating
365 Days of Inspiring Media	4/5 stars
CCM Magazine	4/5 stars
Jesus Freak Hideout	4/5 stars
New Release Today	4/5 stars

Kevin Sparkman, indicating in a four star review by CCM Magazine, responds, "Don't worry, you won't feel dumb for picking up this release!" Awarding the EP four stars at New Release Today, Phronsie Howell states, "Crowder assembles an outstanding live set, and Neon Porch Extravaganza lets those who may not have been able to see it be a part of the experience." Mark D. Geil, giving the EP four stars from Jesus Freak Hideout, writes, "there's enough novelty to make the EP worthwhile, and the EP gives a good taste of just how much fun a Crowder show is." Rating the EP four stars for 365 Days of Inspiring Media, Jonathan Andre describes, "Neon Porch Extravaganza, just like its predecessor Neon Steeple, is just one great worship song after the other."

== Track listing ==
No.	Title	Writer(s)	Length
1.	"My Beloved"	David Crowder, Ed Cash, Seth Philpott	5:53
2.	"I Am"	Crowder, Cash	4:06
3.	"Lift Your Head Weary Sinner (Chains)" (featuring Tedashii)	Crowder, Cash, Philpott	4:11
4.	"Hold On, We're Going Home" (Drake cover)	Aubrey Graham, Noah Shebib, Majid Al Maskati, Jordan Ullman	1:42
5.	"Come As You Are"	Crowder, Ben Glover, Matt Maher	4:40
6.	"Hands of Love"	Crowder, Philpott	5:17
Total length:			25:49

== Chart performance ==
Chart (2015)	Peak position
US Top Christian Albums (Billboard)	11
US Top Rock Albums (Billboard)	39
