= Somebody Prayed =

Song by American Christian musician Crowder

Song by Crowder

from the album The Exile
- Released: May 31, 2024
- Length: 3:46
- Label: Sixstepsrecords; Capitol CMG
- Songwriters: Ben Glover; Crowder; Jeff Sojka; Michael Cochren
- Producers: Ben Glover; Jeff Sojka

"Somebody Prayed" is a song by American Christian musician Crowder. The song was released on May 31, 2024, on Crowder's fifth studio album, The Exile, through Sixstepsrecords/Capitol CMG.

The song was written by David Crowder, Ben Glover, Jeff Sojka, and Michael Cochren. It was produced by Glover and Sojka.

== Chart performance ==
"Somebody Prayed" reached No. 11 on the Billboard Hot Christian Songs chart, No. 3 on the Christian Airplay and AC charts, No. 22 on the Christian Streaming Songs chart, and No. 9 on the Christian Digital Song Sales chart. On the 2024 year-end charts, the song reached No. 56 on the Hot Christian Songs chart.

== Dylan Scott version ==
On October 18, 2024, an edition of the song was released as a single, featuring guest vocals by Dylan Scott.

== Track listing ==
Original edition
No.	Title	Writer(s)	Producer(s)	Length
1.	"Somebody Prayed"	Ben Glover; David Crowder; Jeff Sojka; Michael Cochren	Ben Glover; Jeff Sojka	3:46

Dylan Scott edition
No.	Title	Writer(s)	Producer(s)	Length
1.	"Somebody Prayed" (with Dylan Scott)	Ben Glover; David Crowder; Jeff Sojka; Michael Cochren	Ben Glover; Jeff Sojka	3:46

== Charts ==
=== Weekly charts ===
Weekly chart performance for "Somebody Prayed"
Chart (2024–2025)	Peak position
US Christian Adult Contemporary (Billboard)	3
US Christian Airplay (Billboard)	3
US Hot Christian Songs (Billboard)	7

=== Year-end charts ===
Year-end chart performance for "Somebody Prayed"
Chart (2024)	Position
US Christian Songs (Billboard)	56
Chart (2025)	Position
US Christian Airplay (Billboard)	5
US Christian Adult Contemporary (Billboard)	2
US Christian Songs (Billboard)	14
