= The Exile (album) =

Studio album by Crowder
- Released: May 31, 2024
- Length: 38:16
- Labels: Sixstepsrecords; Capitol CMG
- Producers: Hank Bentley; Ben Glover; Jeff Sojka

Crowder chronology
Milk & Honey (2021)	The Exile (2024)

Singles from The Exile
- 1. "Grave Robber" Released: November 10, 2023; 2. "— (Dash)" Released: April 5, 2024; 3. "Even in Exile" Released: May 3, 2024

The Exile is the fifth studio album by American Christian musician Crowder. The album was released on May 31, 2024, through Sixstepsrecords/Capitol CMG. The album was released on CD and for digital download. It featured the singles "— (Dash)", "Even in EXILE", and the Billboard Christian Airplay and AC No. 1 hit, "Grave Robber". The album is second in a trilogy, which was preceded by Milk & Honey of 2021.

== Background ==
The song "All My Tears", which featured Buddy Miller, was a cover of a song by Julie Miller and Emmylou Harris.

== Chart performance ==
The Exile peaked at No. 102 on the Billboard 200, No. 7 on the Top Album Sales chart, No. 1 on the Top Christian Albums chart, and No. 7 on the Top Current Album Sales chart.

The song "— (Dash)" reached No. 33 on the Hot Christian Songs chart. "Grave Robber" reached No. 8 on the Hot Christian Songs chart, No. 1 on the Christian Airplay and Christian AC chart, No. 24 on the Christian Streaming Songs chart, and No. 2 on the Christian Digital Song Sales chart. Although not released as a single, "Somebody Prayed" reached No. 11 on the Hot Christian Songs chart, No. 3 on the Christian Airplay chart, No. 3 on the Christian AC chart, No. 22 on the Christian Streaming Songs chart, and No. 9 on the Christian Digital Song sales chart. The song "Even in EXILE" was released as a single, but did not enter any charts.

== Critical reception ==
Professional ratings
Review scores
Source	Rating
365 Days of Inspiring Media	5/5 stars
Jesus Freak Hideout	4/5 stars
New Release Today	5/5 stars
Todays Christian Entertainment	3.7/5 stars

At Jesus Freak Hideout, Alex Caldwell gave the album 4-out-of-5 stars, reviewing that the Exile is "a great listen, for both the soul and the ears". At 365 Days of Inspiring Media, Joshua Andre revied a 5-out-of-5 praised the album, stating, "With The Exile having no fault at all, it’s a shame the profound and deep musical experience ends at 38 minutes." Kelly Meade of Todays Christian Entertainment gave the album 3.7-out-of-5 stars, stating that the album is a "unique album that both long time listeners of Crowder and newer fans will find something that stirs their faith." New Release Today awarded the album 5-out-of-5 stars.

== Track listing ==
No.	Title	Writer(s)	Producer(s)	Length
1.	"The Exile Intro"	Crowder; Hank Bentley	Ben Glover; Jeff Sojka	0:33
2.	"Grave Robber"	Ben Glover; Crowder; Jeff Sojka	Ben Glover; Jeff Sojka	2:51
3.	"— (Dash)" (with TobyMac)	Ben Glover; Crowder; Jeff Sjoka; Louie Giglio; Toby McKeehan	Ben Glover; Jeff Sojka	2:58
4.	"Still (with Zach Williams)"	Ben Glover; Crowder; Jeff Sojka	Ben Glover; Jeff Sojka	3:12
5.	"Rinsed in the Blood"	Ben Glover; Crowder; Jeff Sojka; Rebecca Lauren Olds; Solomon Olds	Ben Glover; Jeff Sojka	2:57
6.	"Even in Exile"	Crowder; Jeff Pardo; Matthew West	Ben Glover; Jeff Sojka	3:36
7.	"Somebody Prayed"	Ben Glover; Crowder; Jeff Sojka; Michael Cochren	Ben Glover; Jeff Sojka	3:46
8.	"Hands of Jesus"	Ben Glover; Crowder; Hank Bentley; Jeff Sojka; Jonathan Smith	Ben Glover; Jeff Sojka	3:56
9.	"Lord of All"	Ben Glover; Crowder; Jeff Sojka	Ben Glover; Jeff Sojka	4:31
10.	"Unstoppable"	Ben Glover; Crowder; Jeff Sojka; Rebecca Lauren Olds; Solomon Olds	Ben Glover; Jeff Sojka	3:04
11.	"All My Tears" (with Buddy Miller)	Julie Anne Miller	Hank Bentley; Ben Glover; Jeff Sojka	3:32
12.	"Truth Be Told"	Crowder; Hank Bentley	Hank Bentley; Ben Glover; Jeff Sojka	3:15
Total length:				38:16

== Charts ==
=== Weekly ===
Chart (2024)	Peak position
US Billboard 200 (Billboard)	102
US Top Christian Albums (Billboard)	1

=== Year-end ===
Chart (2024)	Position
US Top Christian Albums (Billboard)	50
Chart (2025)	Position
US Top Christian Albums (Billboard)	41
