= A Night Like This =

A Night Like This may refer to:

== Theatre and film ==
- A Night Like This (play), a 1930 British farce, the seventh of the eleven Aldwych farces
- A Night Like This (1932 film), a British comedy film directed by Tom Walls, based on the play
- A Night Like This (2025 film), a British LGBTQ romantic drama film directed by Liam Calvert

== Music ==
- A Night Like This (album), 1993, by Rebecka Törnqvist
- "A Night Like This" (song), 2009, by Caro Emerald
- "A Night Like This", a song from the album The Head on the Door by The Cure

== See also ==
- Night Like This (disambiguation)
- Nights Like This (disambiguation)
