= Broken Prayers =

Single by Riley Clemmons

from the album Riley Clemmons
- Released: December 8, 2017
- Recorded: 2017
- Genre: Worship; CCM
- Length: 3:14
- Label: Capitol CMG; Maxx
- Songwriter(s): Riley Clemmons; Emily Weisband; Josh Kerr; Ben Glover; Tedd T
- Producer(s): Ben Glover; Tedd T

Riley Clemmons singles chronology
| "Misfit Anthem" (2017) | "Broken Prayers" (2017) | "Out My Mind" (2018) |

Music video
- "Broken Prayers" on YouTube

"Broken Prayers" is the debut single by American Christian musician Riley Clemmons. It was released for digital download on December 8, 2017 as the first single from her debut studio album Riley Clemmons, by Capitol CMG. The song was released to Christian radio and peaked at No. 17 on the Hot Christian Songs chart. The song is played in a G major key, and 87 beats per minute.

== Background ==
She discussed her story behind the song in a video uploaded to her YouTube channel, "The song "Broken Prayers" came truly from a place of brokenness and that feeling of having to get yourself together and bring the best most picture-perfect version of yourself to God, basically feeling like the broken pieces aren't good enough for God. The song came from a place of truly finding peace in the fact that God takes you at your most broken, at your lowest place and at your roughest. And not only does He take you there but He delights in it. And He genuinely loves you in that place".

== Music video ==
A music video for the single "Broken Prayers" was released on December 8, 2017. The visual features Clemmons performing in the middle of a desert.

== Track listing ==
- Digital download
1. "Broken Prayers" – 3:14
- Digital download (piano version)
1. "Broken Prayers" – 3:09

== Charts ==
=== Weekly charts ===
| Chart (2018) | Peak position |
|---|---|
| US Christian AC (Billboard) | 18 |
| US Christian Airplay (Billboard) | 16 |
| US Hot Christian Songs (Billboard) | 17 |
| US Christian AC Indicator (Billboard) | 18 |

=== Year-end charts ===
| Chart (2018) | Peak position |
|---|---|
| US Christian AC (Billboard) | 45 |
| US Christian Airplay (Billboard) | 42 |
| US Christian Songs (Billboard) | 45 |
