= Alexander Lincoln =

British actor (born 1994)

- Born: 21 January 1994 (age 32); Lambeth, London, England
- Occupation: Actor
- Years active: 2014–present

Alexander Lincoln (born 21 January 1994) is a British actor best known for his portrayals of Jamie Tate in Emmerdale from 2019 to 2021, and Mark Newton in the 2022 romantic drama film In from the Side. He has also portrayed Joel Tanner in the BBC soap opera Doctors.

== Career ==
Lincoln made his television debut in the ITV1 soap Emmerdale, playing Jamie Tate from 2019 to 2021.

In 2022, Lincoln starred as Mark Newton in the film In from the Side. In 2024, he appeared in seven episodes of television soap Doctors as Joel Tanner.

In 2025, he starred as Oliver in the film A Night Like This, opposite Jack Brett Anderson. In June and July 2025, Lincoln starred in the Billy Porter-directed play, This Bitter Earth, at the Soho Theatre in London.

== Personal life ==
On Instagram, Lincoln hinted at his sexual orientation in January 2023, stating that he is "not straight".

== Filmography ==
=== Film ===
Year	Title	Role	Notes
2014	Sun in the Night	Doctor	Short film; credited as Alex Lincoln
2014	Maengwyn	Aaron Ripley Smith	Short film; credited as Alex Lincoln
2015	Wander	Noah	Short film; credited as Alex Lincoln
2015	The Song Plays On	Young John	Short film; credited as Alex Lincoln
2016	Infinite	Wolfie	Short film; credited as Alex Lincoln
2016	Recall	Sal	Short film; credited as Alex Lincoln
2018	How Was Work?	Daniel	Short film
2018	Ilford Lane	Adam	Short film
2018	Degenerates	Young Man	
2019	As I Am	Kenner	
2022	In from the Side	Mark Newton	
2022	The Fence	Wayne Pickett	
2022	Inland	Tom	
2023	My Dreams Have Been Dark of Late	Knight	Short film
2024	The Groomsmen: First Look	Zack	
2024	The Groomsmen: Second Chances	Zack	
2024	The Groomsmen: Last Dance	Zack	
2024	Losing It		
2025	A Night Like This	Oliver	
TBA	Gods Among Us	Thor	
TBA	Barely Grown	Jim	
TBA	Aurora	Jacob	

=== Television ===
Year	Title	Role	Notes
2017	Red Light	Adam	Miniseries; credited as Alex Lincoln
2019–2021	Emmerdale	Jamie Tate	325 episodes
2022	Everything I Know About Love	Rege	4 episodes
2024	Doctors	Joel Tanner	7 episodes

== Stage ==
Year	Title	Role	Notes
2025	This Bitter Earth	Neal	

== Awards and nominations ==
Year	Award	Category	Work	Result	Ref.
2021	Inside Soap Awards	Best Villain	Emmerdale	Nominated	
2022	FilmOut San Diego	Best Actor	In from the Side	Won	
2022	British Independent Film Awards	Best Breakthrough Performance	In from the Side	Longlisted	
