= Crowder (musician) =

American musician

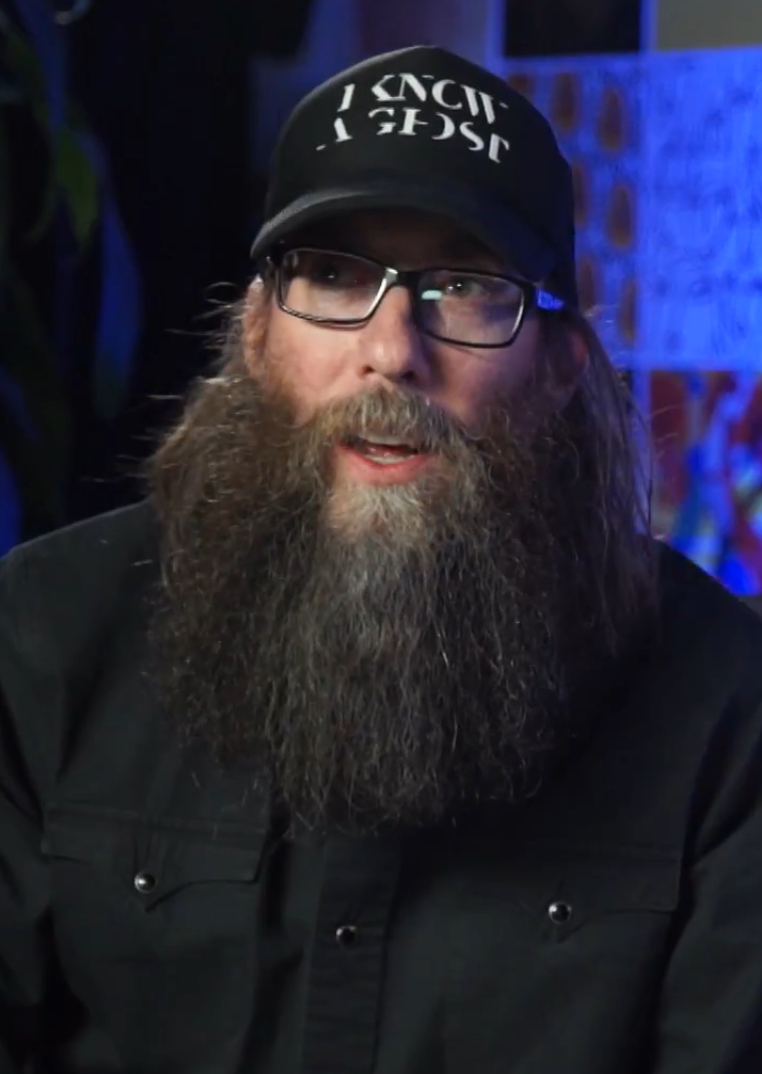
- Crowder in 2018

Background information
- Also known as: Crowder
- Born: David Wallace Crowder; November 29, 1971 (age 54); Texarkana, Texas, U.S.
- Origin: Waco, Texas
- Genres: Contemporary Christian music; modern worship; folktronica; Christian rock
- Occupation: Musician
- Instruments: Vocals, guitar
- Years active: 1996–present
- Labels: sixsteps, Sparrow
- Website: crowdermusic.com

David Wallace Crowder (born November 29, 1971), known professionally by his mononymous stage name Crowder since 2012, is an American contemporary Christian music singer, songwriter, multi-instrumentalist and author. He was the lead singer in the Christian rock and worship band David Crowder*Band from 1996 to 2012, before he started his solo career on sixstepsrecords and Sparrow Records labels.

He released his first solo album, Neon Steeple, on May 27, 2014. Crowder released his first solo single off the album, "I Am", on November 25, 2013, which rose to the No. 3 position on the Christian Songs chart. American Prodigal, Crowder's second solo album, was released on September 23, 2016 and his third, I Know a Ghost, on November 9, 2018. His fourth solo album, Milk & Honey, released on June 11, 2021.

Crowder, with a trademark appearance comparative to members of the ZZ Top band, is a recipient of five Grammy nominations and winner of 13 Dove Awards .

== Early life and education ==
David Wallace Crowder was born on November 29, 1971, in Texarkana, Texas. His parents are Marian and Dan Crowder, the owner of the Dan Crowder insurance agency, who were involved in all his extra curricular activities Following high school, he went to college at Baylor University in Waco, Texas. His ministry started during his time at Baylor with the goal of helping to create a church experience for Christians to attend, since he found that most of his peers at Baylor weren't attending a church even though they were attending a Christian university. "My junior year of college, at Baylor University, a friend of mine started a church and asked me to help with the music. I got into this because I wanted to be useful. It's that simple. I do not think of myself as an artist or musician, I think of myself as useful and helpful."

== Career ==
=== David Crowder* Band (1996–2012) ===
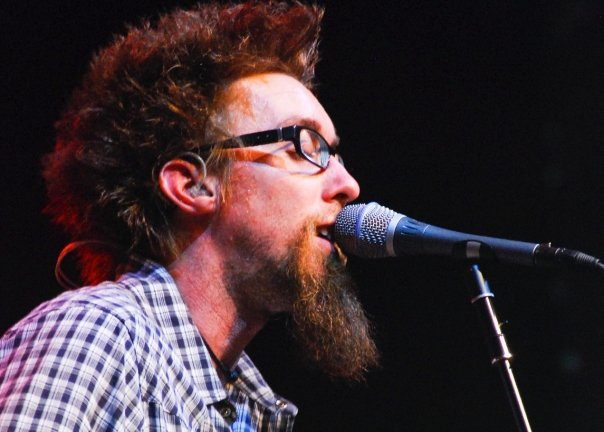
Crowder performing in 2009

Crowder was the lead vocalist of the David Crowder Band from 1996 until the group disbanded in 2012. At that time, Crowder started his solo career on the Sparrow Records imprint, sixstepsrecords. During the band's time together they released sixteen singles through six studio albums, two live albums, four Extended Plays (EPs) and one compilation album. David Crowder Band (stylized as David Crowder*Band and The David Crowder*Band) was a six-piece Christian rock and modern worship band from Waco, Texas. Their final album debuted at No. 1 on the Billboard Christian and No. 2 on the Billboard 200 charts. They disbanded in 2012, with David Crowder pursuing a solo career under the name Crowder and the rest of the band, except for Mike Hogan, forming The Digital Age.

David Crowder*Band
Background information
Origin	Waco, Texas, U.S.
Genres	Christian rock; electronic rock; worship; bluegrass; alternative rock; folk rock
Years active	1996–2012
Labels	sixstepsrecords, Sparrow, EMI, Capitol CMG
Past members	David Crowder Jack Parker, Jeremy "B-Wack" Bush, Mike Dodson, Mike Hogan, Mark Waldrop, Jason Solley, Taylor Johnson

=== Solo career (2013-present) ===
Crowder released his debut solo studio album on May 27, 2014, Neon Steeple. The lead single, "I Am", released on November 25, 2013, charted at No, 3 on the Billboard Christian Songs chart. "Come As You Are" achieved a Grammy nomination in 2015 for Best Contemporary Christian Music Performance/Song.

His second solo album, American Prodigal, was released September 23, 2016. The first single, "Run Devil Run", was released on June 18, 2016. "Forgiven" was the second single released.

On September 19, 2018, Crowder announced a third solo album and released the first two singles, "Red Letters" and "Wildfire". The album, I Know a Ghost, was released on November 9, 2018.

Crowder's fourth studio album, titled Milk & Honey, was released on June 11, 2021. The album was supported with the three singles "Good God Almighty", "In the House", and "God Really Loves Us". The album features appearances from Hulvey, Dante Bowe and Maverick City Music.

Beginning in January 2024, Crowder began touring in Jam Nation's Winter Jam Tour with Christian artists CAIN, Katy Nichole, and Newsong.

Crowder announced his new album The Exile on April 5, 2024, after dropping a new single "[DASH]" featuring TobyMac. The album was released on May 31, 2024.

== Books ==
David Crowder has written two books:

- David Crowder, Praise Habit: Finding God in Sunsets and Sushi, NavPress, 2005.
- David Crowder with Mike Hogan, Everybody Wants to Go to Heaven, but Nobody Wants to Die or (The Eschatology of Bluegrass), Relevant Books, 2006.

== Discography ==
=== Studio albums ===
List of studio albums, with selected chart positions
Title	Album details	Peak chart positions			Certifications
Title	Album details	US	US Christ.	UK C&G	Certifications
Neon Steeple	Released: May 27, 2014; Label: Sparrow/sixstepsrecords; Formats: CD, digital download, vinyl	9	1	4	RIAA: Gold
American Prodigal	Released: September 23, 2016; Label: Sparrow/sixstepsrecords; Formats: CD, digital download, vinyl, cassette	12	1	6	
I Know a Ghost	Released: November 9, 2018; Label: Sparrow/sixstepsrecords; Formats: CD, digital download, vinyl, cassette	43	2	—	
Milk & Honey	Released: June 11, 2021; Label: Sparrow/sixstepsrecords; Formats: CD, digital download	59	1	10	
The Exile	Released: May 31, 2024; Label: Sparrow/sixstepsrecords; Formats: CD, digital download	102	1	—	
Return	Released: TBA; Label: TBA; Formats: TBA	TBA	TBA	—	
"—" denotes a recording that did not chart.

=== Other albums ===
List of studio albums, with selected chart positions
Title	Album details	Peak chart positions			
Title	Album details	US	US Christ.	US Rock	US Folk
iTunes Session	Released: November 13, 2012; Label: Sparrow/sixstepsrecords; Formats: Digital download	172	9	50	9
Milk & Cookies: A Merry Crowder Christmas	Released: October 21, 2022; Label: Sparrow/sixstepsrecords; Formats: CD, digital download	—	29	—	—

=== EPs ===
List of EPs, with selected chart positions
Title	EP details	Peak chart positions	
Title	EP details	US Christ	US Rock
Neon Porch Extravaganza	Released: October 30, 2015; Label: Sparrow/sixstepsrecords; Formats: CD, digital download	11	39

=== Singles ===
==== As a lead artist ====
List of singles, with selected chart positions
Title	Year	Peak chart positions					Certifications	Album
Title	Year	US Bub.	US Christ	US Christ Air.	US Christ AC	US Christ Digital	Certifications	Album
"I Am"	2013	—	3	2	6	3		Neon Steeple
"Come As You Are"	2014	—	3	1	6	5	RIAA: Platinum	Neon Steeple
"Lift Your Head Weary Sinner (Chains)"	2015	—	11	14	15	11	RIAA: Gold	Neon Steeple
"Run Devil Run"	2016	—	22	26	—	6	RIAA: Gold	American Prodigal
"My Victory"	2016	—	12	7	12	10		American Prodigal
"Forgiven"	2017	—	10	8	10	10	RIAA: Gold	American Prodigal
"Back to the Garden"	2017	—	45	—	—	—		American Prodigal
"All My Hope" (original or with Tauren Wells)	2017	—	3	1	2	1	RIAA: Platinum	American Prodigal
"Red Letters" / "Wildfire"	2018	—	9	8	11	5	RIAA: Gold	I Know a Ghost
"Red Letters" / "Wildfire"	2018	—	43	—	—	—		I Know a Ghost
"Let It Rain (Is There Anybody)" (featuring Mandisa)	2019	—	10	6	6	13		I Know a Ghost
"I'm Leaning on You" (featuring Riley Clemmons)	2020	—	19	15	16	—		I Know a Ghost
"Night Like This"	2020	—	47	—	—	—		I Know a Ghost
"Good God Almighty"	2021	17	1	1	1	1	RIAA: Gold	Milk & Honey
"In the House"	2021	19	1	1	1	19		Milk & Honey
"O Holy Night" (with Passion)	2021	—	—	46	—	—		Non-album single
"God Really Loves Us" (with Dante Bowe featuring Maverick City Music)	2022	—	3	3	4	—	RIAA: Gold	Milk & Honey
"Grave Robber" (original or with Zach Williams)	2023	—	8	1	1	2		The Exile
"— [Dash]" (featuring TobyMac)	2024	—	36	—	—	—		The Exile
"The Rock" (with Forrest Frank)	2025	— (Note: "The Rock" did not enter the Bubbling Under Hot 100 Singles, but peaked at No. 4 on the Digital Song Sales)	6	—	—	1		Non-album singles
"It Really Is Amazing Grace" (with Phil Wickham)	2026	— (Note: "It Really Is Amazing Grace" did not enter the Bubbling Under Hot 100 Singles, but peaked at No. 9 on the Digital Song Sales)	14	9	6	1		Non-album singles
"Never Gonna Die (July!)"	2026	—	—	—	—	—		Non-album singles
"—" denotes a recording that did not chart.

==== As a featured artist ====
List of singles, with selected chart positions
Title	Year	Peak chart positions	Album
Title	Year	US Christ	Album
"Testify" (Social Club Misfits featuring Crowder)	2019	46	Mood // Doom
"Home" (Tedashii featuring Crowder)	2019	—	Never Fold
"My Jesus" (Anne Wilson featuring Crowder)	2021	—	My Jesus
"—" denotes a recording that did not chart.

=== Promotional singles ===
List of singles, with selected chart positions
Title	Year	Peak chart positions		Album
Title	Year	US Christ.	US Christ. Digital	Album
"He Is"	2021	30	11	Milk & Honey
"Milk & Honey"	2021	37	—	Milk & Honey
"The Anchor"	2021	—	—	Milk & Honey
"Even in Exile"	2024	—	—	The Exile
"—" denotes a recording that did not chart.

=== Other charted songs ===
Title	Year	Peak chart positions				Album
Title	Year	US Christ	US Christ Air.	US Christ AC	US Christ Digital	Album
"This I Know"	2013	—	—	—	14	Neon Steeple
"My Beloved"	2014	—	—	—	25	Neon Steeple
"Somebody Prayed" (original or with Dylan Scott)	2024	7	3	3	9	The Exile
"Still" (original or with Zach Williams)	2025	19	4	3	—	The Exile

=== Music videos ===
Title	Year	Album	Source
"Come As You Are"	2014	Neon Steeple	Watch
"Run Devil Run"	2016	American Prodigal	Watch
"Forgiven"	2017	American Prodigal	Watch
"Back to the Garden"	2017	American Prodigal	Watch
"Prove It featuring KB"	2017	American Prodigal	Watch
"All My Hope (featuring Tauren Wells)"	2017	non-album single	Watch

== Awards ==
=== GMA Dove Awards ===
Year	Nominee / work	Award	Result
2015	"Come As You Are"	Song of the Year	Nominated
2015	"Lift Your Head Weary Sinner (Chains)"	Rock/Contemporary Song of the Year	Nominated
2015	"Come As You Are"	Pop/Contemporary Song of the Year	Nominated
2015	Neon Steeple	Pop/Contemporary Album of the Year	Nominated
2015	Neon Steeple	Recorded Music Packaging of the Year	Won
2017	"Run Devil Run"	Rock/Contemporary Recorded Song of the Year	Nominated
2017	American Prodigal	Rock/Contemporary Album of the Year	Nominated
2017	American Prodigal	Recorded Music Packaging of the Year	Nominated
2017	Run Devil Run	Short Form Video of the Year	Won
2018	"All My Hope"	Song of the Year	Nominated
2018	"All My Hope"	Pop/Contemporary Recorded Song of the Year	Nominated
2019	"Red Letters"	Song of the Year	Nominated
2019	"Wildfire"	Rock/Contemporary Recorded Song of the Year	Won
2019	I Know a Ghost	Pop/Contemporary Album of the Year	Nominated
2019	Red Letters	Short Form Video of the Year	Nominated
2021	"Good God Almighty"	Pop/Contemporary Recorded Song of the Year	Nominated
2022	"Good God Almighty"	Song of the Year	Nominated
2022	"Higher Power" (featuring Hulvey)	Rock/Contemporary Recorded Song of the Year	Won
2022	Milk & Honey	Pop/Contemporary Album of the Year	Nominated
2022	Milk & Honey	Recorded Music Packaging of the Year	Nominated
2025	"Somebody Prayed"	Short Form Video of the Year (Concept)	Pending

=== We Love Awards ===
Year	Nominee / work	Category	Result	Ref.
2025	"Still" (with Zach Williams)	Collaboration of the Year	Nominated	

== See also ==
- David Crowder Band discography
