= Red Letters (song) =

- Southern-Style Edit cover

Single by Crowder

from the album I Know a Ghost
- B-side: "Wildfire"
- Released: September 19, 2018
- Recorded: 2018
- Genre: CCM; modern worship
- Length: 3:48
- Label: Sparrow/sixstepsrecords
- Songwriter(s): David Crowder; Ed Cash
- Producer(s): Crowder; Cash

Crowder singles chronology
"All My Hope" (2017)	"Red Letters" / "Wildfire" (2018)	"Testify" (2019)

Music video
- "Red Letters" on YouTube

"Red Letters" is a song performed by American contemporary Christian music singer Crowder. It was released as one of the first singles from his third studio album, I Know a Ghost (2018), alongside "Wildfire" on September 19, 2018. The song peaked at No. 9 on the US Hot Christian Songs chart, becoming his fifth top ten single. "Red Letters" was nominated for the GMA Dove Awards for Song of the Year and Short Form Video of the Year at the 2019 GMA Dove Awards.

== Background ==
Crowder released the song on September 19, 2018, and announced his third studio album I Know a Ghost. He explained the meaning behind the song in a video on his YouTube channel, "When I was a kid I remember sitting in the church pew next to my grandmother and asking her why some of her bible was written in red. She explained it was the Red Letter edition and whenever Jesus, God's only Son, spoke, it was written in red. As a kid I thought that was just how God wrote it. Nope. I was wrong. About this and other things. Turns out it was a guy by the name of Louis Klopsch. It was the late 1800s and he very much wanted the common man to not only have access to scripture but for the story of God's reconciliation to jump off the pages as it had for him. At the time, translations such as the King James didn't use punctuation marks that are common place now. You can imagine how difficult numerous passages could be with the absence of any quotation marks or full stops. One evening, he was reading in Luke 22:20, 'This cup is the new covenant in my blood, which is poured out for you,' and that is when Mr. Klopsch had an idea -the words of Jesus in red. He didn't stop there, he and the editors went all the way to the beginning and took any scripture in the old testament foretelling the arrival of a messiah as well as any scriptures that Jesus was quoted as quoting and put them in red as well; a scarlet thread woven through all of time and creation."

== Composition ==
The song is played in a B major key, and 148 beats per minute (BPM).

== Reception ==
=== Critical response ===
"Red Letters" was described in reviews on Jesusfreakhideout as a "typical Crowder radio song", comparing it to one of his singles from his last album "My Victory". It was also compared to dc Talk's 1998 hit, which both focus on the words of Christ from the bible.

=== Accolades ===
Awards
Year	Organization	Award	Result	Ref.
2019	GMA Dove Awards	Song of the Year	Nominated	
2019	GMA Dove Awards	Short Form Video of the Year	Nominated	

== Commercial performance ==
It debuted at No. 29 on the Hot Christian Songs chart. After the release of the album, it rose to No. 16. The song reached the top 10 on its twenty-third week, reaching its peak of No, 9.

== Track listing ==
CD release

1. "Red Letters" – 3:48
2. "Red Letters (Lead Sheet (Medium Key)" – 3:49
3. "Red Letters (Vocal Demonstration)" – 3:40
4. "Red Letters (High Key With Background Vocals)" – 3:40
5. "Red Letters (High Key Without Background Vocals)" – 3:40
6. "Red Letters (Medium Key With Background Vocals)" – 3:40
7. "Red Letters (Medium Key Without Background Vocals)" – 3:40
8. "Red Letters (Low Key With Background Vocals)" – 3:40
9. "Red Letters (Low Key Without Background Vocals)" – 3:40
- Digital download
1. "Red Letters" – 3:48
2. "Wildfire" – 3:14
- Digital download (acoustic)
1. "Red Letters" – 3:49
- Digital download (Southern-Style edit)
1. "Red Letters" – 3:42

== Music video ==
The music video for "Red Letters" was released on October 29, 2018. It was inspired by Louis Klopsch's statement in the introduction of his Red Letter Bible, "It sheds a new radiance upon the sacred pages, by which the reader is enabled to trace unerringly the scarlet thread of prophecy from Genesis to Malachi. Like the Star which led the Magi to Bethlehem, this light, shining through the entire Word, leads straight to the person of the Divine Messiah, as the fulfillment of the promise of all the ages." Crowder also adds, "The meta-narrative of the story of God's rescue woven through the Scriptures is intricate and powerful and that's what I wanted to pick up on with this song. It's worth singing about. I love it and I hope it's meaningful for my fans and listeners out there."

== Charts ==
=== Weekly charts ===
Weekly chart performance for "Red Letters"
Chart (2018–19)	Peak position
US Hot Christian Songs (Billboard)	9
US Christian Airplay (Billboard)	8
US Christian AC (Billboard)	11

=== Year-end charts ===
Year-end chart performance for "Red Letters"
Chart (2019)	Position
US Christian Songs (Billboard)	27
US Christian Airplay (Billboard)	29
US Christian AC (Billboard)	30

== Certifications ==
Region	Certification	Certified units/sales
United States (RIAA)	Gold	500,000^{‡}
^{‡} Sales+streaming figures based on certification alone.
