= In from the Side =

2022 British LGBTQ film

- Theatrical release poster
- Directed by: Matt Carter
- Written by: Matt Carter; Adam Silver
- Produced by: Andrew Faure; Adam Silver; Matt Carter
- Starring: Alexander Lincoln; Alexander King; Christopher Sherwood; Peter McPherson; Pearse Egan; Carl Loughlin; Ivan Comisso
- Cinematography: Matt Carter
- Edited by: Matt Carter
- Music by: Matt Carter
- Production company: Take A Seat Pictures
- Distributed by: Verve Pictures (United Kingdom); Strand Releasing (United States)
- Release date: 16 September 2022
- Running time: 134 minutes
- Country: United Kingdom
- Language: English
- Budget: $60,000
- Box office: $52,885

In from the Side is a 2022 British romantic drama film, directed by Matt Carter and written by Carter and Adam Silver. The film, which features Alexander Lincoln and Alexander King, tells the story of rugby players Mark and Warren from a cash-strapped, divided gay rugby club who unwittingly sleepwalk into an adulterous affair, but must conceal their growing feelings or risk destroying the club they love. Carter had been involved in inclusive rugby for 8 years when the film was released.

It was released in the United Kingdom on 16 September 2022. It was released in the US on 20 January 2023. It was released on Netflix UK on 28 March.

== Plot ==
Mark Newton is a new and relatively inexperienced player on the B team of a London rugby club for gay men. He has a drunken encounter with Warren Hunt, a star player on the A team. Both men are in unhappy, long-term relationships. Warren's boyfriend, John, is also another star player on the A team who Warren only stays with out of loyalty for helping him during a difficult period in his life. Warren is initially worried the affair will get back to John. Mark's condescending boyfriend, Richard, allows for an open relationship as long as Mark tells him about it and doesn't let it get past a one-time occurrence. While Richard travels for work, Mark and Warren decide to pursue a relationship. Mark's attempts to hide from his infidelity cause his relationships with his teammates to suffer. Henry, another new rugby player, develops an alcohol problem due to his loneliness and unreciprocated feelings for Mark.

After losing their first game, B team takes on a serious competitor to establish themselves as a committed team or else they'll be dropped. Wanting to be with Mark, Warren offers to join the B team under the guise of helping them win. In doing so, B team player Gareth is benched for the game, causing him to be resentful of Warren. The team wins the game, and Mark abandons a drunken Henry to have sex with Warren at the hotel. The team notices Mark's detachment from the team, and Henry feels abandoned by Mark. Richard comes home and declines to spend Christmas in the French Alps with Mark's parents, prompting Mark to invite Warren instead. Warren is warmly welcomed by Mark's family and enjoys Christmas together. Mark's mother reveals that she took his father from a long-term relationship and felt extreme guilt for hurting his girlfriend. During their marriage, his father had multiple affairs. She warns Mark that a relationship born from deception only creates more, and causes widespread collateral damage. Mark's father argues that he cannot be preoccupied with not wanting to hurt other people's feelings or else he would miss out on the joyous things life has to offer.

At the club's New Year's Eve party, Warren sends a text to Mark while Gareth uses his phone. After seeing the text, Gareth tells Henry and John out of revenge for getting benched, causing John to attack Mark. Mark leaves the party after Warren refuses to intervene, and comes home to find Richard with a photo Mark took of a naked Warren, revealing one of Mark's teammates told him everything. Richard breaks up with Mark and kicks him out. The club decides to drop the B team after Mark quits, but Warren convinces Mark to rejoin. With Mark and Henry, B team wins the final game. Richard comes to see Mark play for the first and last time. Mark tries to make amends for the affair, but they decide to stay separated. After the game, Warren reveals that he and John are leaving the club, but is willing to break-up with John for Mark and start over, but Mark declines. At the club's celebration, Henry receives honours for the match. Mark feels at ease with the camaraderie of his teammates, and sees a player from the opposing team staring at him, similar to how he and Warren met, signaling him to being open to new relationships.

== Cast ==
- Alexander Lincoln as Mark Newton
- Alexander King as Warren Hunt
- William Hearle as Henry Michaels
- Christopher Sherwood as Jimmy
- Carl Loughlin as Gareth
- Peter McPherson as John Penrose
- Pearse Egan as Pinky
- Ivan Comisso as Carlos
- Alex Hammond as Richard
- Chris Garner as Stuart
- Mary Lincoln as Alice Newton
- Nigel Fairs as Leonard Newton
- Frank Assi as Neil
- Tom Murphy as Barry
- Kane Surry as Olli
- Steve Brockman as Cardiff Draconians Team Captain

== Background and release ==
In from the Side was partly funded using a crowdfunding model.

The film was shown at the BFI Flare Festival in 2022. It was noted for its approach in that coming out or homophobia aren't in the film at all.

It was part of the official selection of the Dayton LGBT film festival in 2022. It was selected for Outfilm Poznań festival. The film was also shown at Hong Kong Lesbian & Gay Film Festival in 2022 and Inside Out Toronto LGBT Film Festival.

It was released in the United Kingdom on 16 September 2022. It was released in the US on 20 January 2023. In the UK it is rated 15. It was released on Netflix UK on 28 March.

In Australia, the film was released via the Australian Broadcasting Corporation streaming service ABC iview in 2025.

== Reception ==
On the review aggregator website Rotten Tomatoes, 54% of 13 critics' reviews are positive, with an average rating of 5.90/10. Metacritic, which uses a weighted average, assigned the film a score of 42 out of 100, based on 6 critics, indicating "mixed or average" reviews.

Pip Ellwood-Hughes in Entertainment Focus described it with "In From The Side offers a glimpse into the life of a group of friends who play rugby together and happen to be gay. It's different from pretty much every other film I've seen in recent years that falls under the LGBTQ+ umbrella, and it's not a surprise that the film is being embraced by the mainstream. With well-written characters, a truly engaging story and strong performances, In From The Side is without a doubt the best gay film that's been released in a while, and it's also one of the best films I've seen all year."

Cath Clarke of The Guardian gave the film 3 out of 5 stars describing "The setting of the London team is terrifically done, but the dull romance at the centre of Matt Carter's film long outstays its welcome." Xan Brooks, also of The Guardian, criticised it as a "plodding script".

=== Accolades ===
- Nominated - Outstanding First Feature at the Frameline Film Festival 2022
- Winner - Best First Narrative Feature and Best Actor at FilmOut San Diego 2022
- Winner - Best Narrative Feature Audience Award at Out On Film Film Festival Atlanta 2022
- Winner - Best Narrative Feature at ReelQ Pittsburgh Film Festival 2022
- Runner-up - Best Feature Film at OutShine Film Festival Fort Lauderdale 2022
