= Grave Robber (song) =

Single by Crowder

from the album The Exile
- Released: November 10, 2023
- Length: 2:50
- Label: Sixstepsrecords; Capitol CMG
- Songwriters: Ben Glover; David Crowder; Jeff Sojka
- Producers: Ben Glover; Jeff Sojka

Crowder singles chronology
"God Really Loves Us" (2022)	"Grave Robber" (2023)	"— (Dash)" (2024)

"Grave Robber" is a song by American contemporary Christian musician Crowder. The song was released as a single on November 10, 2023, through Sixstepsrecords/Capitol CMG. It was the lead single of Crowder's 2024 studio album The Exile.

== Background ==
Crowder stated that "Grave Robber" is inspired by the biblical story of Lazarus, in which a friend of Jesus' is miraculously brought back to life.

== Chart performance ==
"Grave Robber" reached No. 8 on the Billboard Hot Christian Songs chart, No. 1 on the Christian Airplay and AC charts, No. 24 on the Christian Streaming Songs chart, and No. 2 on the Christian Digital Song Sales chart.

== Zach Williams version ==
On July 19, 2024, Crowder released a second edition of the song, which featured guest vocals from Zach Williams.

== Track listing ==
Original version
No.	Title	Writer(s)	Producer(s)	Length
1.	"Grave Robber"	Ben Glover; Crowder; Jeff Sojka	Ben Glover; Jeff Sojka	2:50

Zach Williams version
No.	Title	Writer(s)	Producer(s)	Length
1.	"Grave Robber" (with Zach Williams)	Ben Glover; Crowder; Jeff Sojka	Ben Glover; Jeff Sojka	2:50

== Charts ==
=== Weekly charts ===
Weekly chart performance for "Grave Robber"
Chart (2024)	Peak position
US Christian Adult Contemporary (Billboard)	1
US Christian Airplay (Billboard)	1
US Hot Christian Songs (Billboard)	8

=== Year-end charts ===
Year-end chart performance for "Grave Robber"
Chart (2024)	Position
US Hot Christian Songs (Billboard)	22
US Christian Airplay (Billboard)	12
US Christian Adult Contemporary (Billboard)	10
