= Let It Rain (Is There Anybody) =

2019 single by Crowder

Single by Crowder featuring Mandisa

from the album I Know a Ghost
- Released: May 31, 2019
- Genre: CCM; adult contemporary; soul; R&B
- Length: 3:27
- Label: Sparrow; Capitol CMG
- Songwriters: David Crowder; Ed Cash
- Producer: Ed Cash

Crowder singles chronology
"Testify" (2019)	"Let It Rain (Is There Anybody)" (2019)	"Home" (2019)

Mandisa singles chronology
"Good News" (2018)	"Let It Rain (Is There Anybody)" (2019)	"Way Maker" (2020)

Music videos
- "Let It Rain (Is There Anybody)" on YouTube
- "Let It Rain (Is There Anybody)" (Lyrics) on YouTube

"Let It Rain (Is There Anybody)" is a song performed by American contemporary Christian music singer Crowder featuring Mandisa. It was released to Christian radio in the United States on May 31, 2019, as the third single from his third studio album, I Know a Ghost (2018). Crowder co-wrote the song with Ed Cash.

"Let It Rain (Is There Anybody)" peaked at No. 10 on the US Hot Christian Songs chart.

== Background ==
On November 2, 2018, Crowder released "Let It Rain (Is There Anybody)" featuring Mandisa as the first promotional single from his studio album I Know a Ghost, concurrently launching the album's pre-order leading up to its release on November 9, 2018. On May 31, 2019, "Let It Rain (Is There Anybody)" impacted Christian radio in the United States, as the third single from the album. Crowder shared the story behind the song, saying:

This is one of those summertime, good-vibe, car cruisin' songs that you just gotta roll the windows down and crank it up. But maybe it's summertime and it's raining and you can't put those windows down, that's ok. The same God that brings that sunshine, brings the rain. And the clouds will clear. He's got it all. He's got you. This is a reminder we all need.

== Composition ==
"Let It Rain (Is There Anybody)" is composed in the key of B with a tempo of 80 beats per minute and a musical time signature of 4/4. The song has "a 70s-soul feel updated with a current R&B soul," with the singers highlighting "the importance of keeping the Lord at the center of everything in your life."

== Commercial performance ==
"Let It Rain (Is There Anybody)" debuted at number 50 on the US Hot Christian Songs chart dated November 24, 2018. The song peaked at number ten on the Hot Christian Songs chart dated September 7, 2019, and spent a total of twenty-six non-consecutive weeks on the chart.

== Music videos ==
Crowder released audio video of "Let It Rain (Is There Anybody)" showcasing the I Know a Ghost album artwork through YouTube on November 2, 2018. Crowder published the lyric video of "Let It Rain (Is There Anybody)" via YouTube on November 9, 2018. On June 7, 2019, Crowder released the official music video for "Let It Rain (Is There Anybody)" featuring Mandisa, filmed at Melrose Billiards Parlor, on YouTube.

== Personnel ==
Credits adapted from Tidal.

- Ed Cash — mixing, producer
- Crowder — primary artist
- Mandisa — featured artist
- Joe LaPorta — mastering

== Charts ==
=== Weekly charts ===
Weekly chart performance for "Let It Rain (Is There Anybody)"
Chart (2018–19)	Peak position
US Hot Christian Songs (Billboard)	10
US Christian Airplay (Billboard)	6
US Christian AC (Billboard)	6

=== Year-end charts ===
Year-end chart performance for "Let It Rain (Is There Anybody)"
Chart (2019)	Position
US Christian Songs (Billboard)	26
US Christian Airplay (Billboard)	20
US Christian AC (Billboard)	17
US Christian CHR (Billboard)	25

== Release history ==
Release dates and formats for "Let It Rain (Is There Anybody)"
Region	Date	Format	Label	Ref.
United States	May 31, 2019	Christian contemporary hit radio	Sparrow; Capitol CMG	
Various	June 28, 2019	Digital download; streaming	Sparrow; Capitol CMG	
