= — (Dash) =

Single by Crowder and TobyMac

from the album The Exile
- Language: English
- Released: April 5, 2024
- Length: 2:58
- Label: Sixstepsrecords; Capitol CMG
- Songwriters: Ben Glover; David Crowder; Jeff Sjoka; Louie Giglio; Toby McKeehan
- Producers: Ben Glover; Jeff Sojka

Crowder singles chronology
"Grave Robber" (2023)	"— (Dash)" (2024)	"The Rock" (2025)

"— (Dash)" (stylized as "— [DASH]") is a song by American Christian musician Crowder, featuring a guest appearance from TobyMac. The song was released as a single on April 5, 2024, through Sixstepsrecords/Capitol CMG. "— (Dash)" was the second single off Crowder's 2024 studio album, The Exile.

== Chart performance ==
"— (Dash)" charted at No. 36 on the Billboard Hot Christian Songs chart.

== Charts ==
Weekly chart performance for "— (Dash)"
Chart (2024)	Peak position
US Hot Christian Songs (Billboard)	36
