= Riley Clemmons =

American Christian singer-songwriter (born 1999)

Riley Elizabeth Clemmons
- Born: Riley Elizabeth Clemmons; December 9, 1999 (age 26)
- Origin: Nashville, Tennessee
- Genres: Worship; CCM
- Occupations: Singer; songwriter
- Instruments: Vocals; piano
- Years active: 2015–present
- Labels: Capitol CMG; Maxx
- Website: rileyclemmons.com

Riley Elizabeth Clemmons is an American singer and songwriter, who plays Christian pop style contemporary worship music. She is known for her Christian radio hits, "Broken Prayers" and "Better for It" from her debut self-titled album via American music distributor Capitol CMG on August 3, 2018. On September 22, 2023, she released her third studio album called, Church Pew, with singles, "Loved by You" and "Miracle".

She has accumulated over half a billion global streams and over 105 million YouTube video views. A Nashville native who is an accomplished composer, performer, producer, and recording artist, Riley draws inspiration from life experiences.

== Early and personal life ==
Riley Clemmons was noticed at a school pageant in Nashville by manager, Mitchell Solarek. She would begin writing songs at the age of 13 and played shows around her hometown. She has worked on her musical craft for several years, including eight years of vocal lessons and a decade of dance lessons. She is currently signed to Capitol CMG.

== Music career ==
In 2015, Clemmons signed to the independent label, Maxx Recordings. Her lyrics are inspired by the struggles of her relationships and faith. She wants to use her music to encourage her generation.

=== 2017–2019: Breakthrough and self-titled debut studio album ===
Clemmons released her debut single on Capitol CMG, "Broken Prayers", on December 8, 2017. A music video was released on the same day. She discussed her story behind the song in a video uploaded to her YouTube channel, "The song "Broken Prayers" came truly from a place of brokenness and that feeling of having to get yourself together and bring the best most picture-perfect version of yourself to God, basically feeling like the broken pieces aren't good enough for God. The song came from a place of truly finding peace in the fact that God takes you at your most broken, at your lowest place and at your roughest. And not only does He take you there but He delights in it. And He genuinely loves you in that place." The song was released to Christian radio and peaked at No. 17 on the Hot Christian Songs chart.

She released her second single, "Better For It," on June 8, 2018. A music video was also released. Clemmons announced she will join Danny Gokey and Tauren Wells for "The Hope Encounter" Tour in September until November. The song peaked at No. 37 on the Hot Christian Songs chart. A music video for "Hold On" was released on July 19, 2018.

Clemmons' self-titled debut studio album was released on August 4, 2018. The album debuted at No. 28 on the Top Christian Albums chart and No. 13 on the US Heatseekers Albums chart.

=== 2019-Present ===
In 2021, her sophomore album, Godsend, would flourish with singles including, “Fighting for Me,” “Keep on Hoping,” and “For the Good.” She was nominated as Female Artist of the Year at the K-Love Awards in 2021, becoming the youngest nominee in the show's history at the age of 20. Riley would go on to be tapped as an artist to watch by People and Rolling Stone and was named one of the Top Christian Artists of 2022 by Billboard. With over half a billion global streams and 85 million YouTube video views at the age of 23, her music has continually proven to impact people.

On September 22, 2023, her third album, Church Pew, released with single, “Loved By You” amassing over 4 million global streams. “Miracle” reached 1 million streams in the first two weeks.

Riley's music has cemented her place as an artist to watch with accolades from Rolling Stone, People Magazine, Dove Awards Nomination, KLOVE Award Nomination as well as performances on the TODAY Show, FOX & Friends, and debut at the Grand Ole Opry.

== Discography ==
=== Studio albums ===
List of studio albums, with selected chart positions
Title	Album details	Peak chart positions	
Title	Album details	US Christ	US Heat
Riley Clemmons	Released: August 4, 2018; Label: Sparrow; Formats: CD, digital download, streaming	28	13
Godsend	Released: June 4, 2021; Label: Sparrow; Formats: CD, digital download, streaming, LP	—	—
Church Pew	Released: September 22, 2023; Label: Sparrow; Formats: CD, digital download, streaming, LP	—	—

=== Extended plays ===
List of extended plays
Title	EP details
Have Yourself a Merry Little Christmas / Silent Night	Released: November 2, 2019; Label: Sparrow; Formats: Digital download
Fighting for Me	Released: June 21, 2019; Label: Sparrow; Formats: Digital download
The First Christmas	Released: October 25, 2019; Label: Sparrow; Formats: Digital download

=== Singles ===
Year	Single	Chart positions					Certifications	Album
Year	Single	US Christ	US Christ Air.	US Christ AC	US Christ Digital	UK Cross	Certifications	Album
2017	"Broken Prayers"	17	16	18	—	—		Riley Clemmons
2018	"Better for It"	37	28	—	—	3		Riley Clemmons
2018	"Broke"	—	—	—	—	—		Riley Clemmons
2018	"Drop Everything"	—	—	—	—	—		Riley Clemmons
2018	"I'll Stay"	—	—	—	—	—		Riley Clemmons
2018	"Silent Night"	—	23	—	—	—		The First Christmas (EP)
2019	"Fighting for Me"	9	4	8	10	7	RIAA: Gold	Godsend
2019	"Free"	—	—	—	—	—		Non-album single
2020	"Over and Over" (featuring Lauren Alaina)	27	24	—	—	—		Godsend
2020	"Healing"	?	?	?	?	—		Godsend
2021	"Keep on Hoping"	?	?	?	?	2		Godsend
2021	“Headspace”	—	—	—	—	—		Godsend
2021	"For the Good"	9	5	10	—	—		Godsend (Deluxe)
2021	“In This Moment”	—	—	—	—	5		Godsend (Deluxe)
2023	"Loved by You"	—	—	—	—	—		Church Pew
2023	"Miracle"	—	—	—	—	—		Church Pew
2024	“Jesus Cries”	—	—	—	—	—		Church Pew
2025	“Runs Deep”	—	—	—	—	—		Non-album single
2026	“For The Boy”	—	—	—	—	—		TBA

=== As featured artist ===
Title	Year	Peak chart positions				Album
Title	Year	US Dance	US Dance Airplay	US Christ.	US Christ. Airplay	Album
"Misfit Anthem" (Social Club Misfits featuring Riley Clemmons)	2017	—	—	—	—	The Misadventures of Fern and Marty
"Out My Mind" (Tritonal featuring Riley Clemmons)	2018	38	12	—	—	Non-album single
"I'm Leaning on You" (Crowder featuring Riley Clemmons)	2020	—	—	19	15	I Know a Ghost

== Awards ==
=== GMA Dove Awards ===
Year	Nominee / work	Award	Result
2019	Riley Clemmons	New Artist of the Year	Nominated
2022	"Without You" (Social Club Misfits featuring Riley Clemmons)	Rap/Hip Hop Recorded Song of the Year	Nominated
