= American Prodigal =

Studio album by Crowder
- Released: September 23, 2016
- Studios: Bentley Street Studios, The Glovebox and Yoda's Palace Studios (Nashville, Tennessee); Ed's (Franklin, Tennessee); Sixstepsrecords Studio (Brentwood, Tennessee); The Projector Room Studio (Atlanta, Georgia); The Lemonade Stand (New York City, New York); The Casita (Hollywood, California)
- Genres: CCM, worship, folk music
- Length: 53:07
- Label: Sparrow/sixsteps (Capitol CMG)
- Producers: Ed Cash; David Crowder; Hank Bentley; Solomon Olds; David Garcia; BT

Crowder chronology
Neon Porch Extravaganza (2015)	American Prodigal (2016)	I Know a Ghost (2018)

Singles from American Prodigal
- 1. "Run Devil Run" Released: June 18, 2016; 2. "Forgiven" Released: March 17, 2017; 3. "All My Hope" Released: September 15, 2017

Professional ratings
Review scores
Source	Rating
365 Days of Inspiring Media	5/5
CCM Magazine	5/5 stars
Church Mag	5/5 stars
CM Addict	4.5/5
Hallels	Not rated
HM	4/5 stars
Jesus Freak Hideout	4/5 stars
Louder Than The Music	5/5 stars
Today's Christian Entertainment	4.7/5 stars

American Prodigal is the second studio album by Crowder. It was released on September 23, 2016, in partnership with Sparrow Records and sixstepsrecords, imprints of Capitol Christian Music Group.

== Awards and accolades ==
On August 9, 2017, it was announced that American Prodigal would be nominated for a GMA Dove Award in the Rock/Contemporary Album of the Year and the Recorded Music Packaging of the Year categories at the 48th Annual GMA Dove Awards.

== Track listing ==
Standard edition
No.	Title	Writer(s)	Length
1.	"American Intro"	David Crowder	1:34
2.	"Keep Me"	Crowder, David Arthur Garcia, Hank Bentley	4:03
3.	"Run Devil Run"	Crowder, Solomon Olds, Lauren Olds	3:26
4.	"My Victory"	Crowder, Darren Mulligan, Ed Cash, Bentley	4:17
5.	"Prove It" (featuring KB)	Crowder, Bentley, Kevin Burgess	2:37
6.	"All You Burdens"	Crowder, Oz Fox, Kevin Howren, S. Olds, L. Olds	2:26
7.	"Back to the Garden"	Crowder, Bentley, Seth Philpott	4:16
8.	"Forgiven"	Crowder, Cash	3:57
9.	"Promised Land (Glory, Hallelujah)" (featuring Tedashii)	Crowder, Bentley, Tedashii Anderson	4:48
10.	"All My Hope"	Crowder, Cash	4:14
11.	"Shouting Grounds"	Crowder, Cash	3:41
12.	"Shepherd"	Crowder, Bentley, Mia Fieldes, Bart Millard	4:01
13.	"All We Sinners"	Crowder, Cash, Philpott	4:35
14.	"American Outro"	Crowder, Bentley	5:12
Total length:			53:07

Deluxe edition
No.	Title	Writer(s)	Length
15.	"Praise the Lord"	Sean McConnel	4:13
16.	"Great Rejoicing"	Thad Cockrell	3:43
17.	"American I/O" (remix by BT)	Crowder, Bentley, Brian Transeau	5:00
Total length:			66:04

== Personnel ==
- David Crowder – vocals, keyboards (1), programming (1, 6, 14), backing vocals (2, 5, 9, 12, 14), all sounds (3), acoustic guitar (6), electric guitar (6), drums (14)
- Hank Bentley – keyboards (1, 7, 12, 14), programming (1, 7, 14), harmonium (1), electric guitars (4, 10, 14), guitars (5, 7, 9, 12), additional keyboards (9), bouzouki (9), backing vocals (9, 12, 14), drums (14)
- David Garcia – keyboards (2, 5, 7, 9, 12), programming (2, 5, 7, 9, 12), drums (2, 5, 7, 9, 12), backing vocals (2, 5)
- Buddy Greene – harmonium (2), harmonica (5)
- Solomon Olds – all sounds (3), programming (6)
- Ed Cash – acoustic piano (4, 8, 10), programming (4, 8, 10, 11, 13), guitars (4, 8, 10), banjo (4, 8), bass (4, 8, 10, 11), backing vocals (4, 8, 10, 11, 13), keyboards (11), electric guitars (11), acoustic guitar (13)
- Kenny Hutson – guitars (5, 9, 12)
- Oz Fox – acoustic guitar (6), electric guitar (6), ganjo (6)
- Kevin Howren – acoustic guitar (6), electric guitar (6)
- Bill Kelliher – electric guitar (6)
- Chelsey Lowe – banjo (6)
- Rebecca Lovell – mandolin (6)
- Paul Mabury – drums (4)
- Christian Paschall – drums (6)
- Aubrey Haynie – fiddle (2, 5, 7, 9, 12)
- Mercy Stevens – backing vocals (2, 7)
- KB – rap (5)
- Tedashii – rap (9)
- Nickie Conley – choir vocals (10)
- Jason Eskridge – choir vocals (10)
- Maureen Murphy – choir vocals (10)

== Production ==
- Louie Giglio – executive producer
- Shelley Giglio – executive producer, art direction, management
- Brad O'Donnell – executive producer
- David Crowder – producer (1, 3, 6, 14–17), engineer (1, 6, 14)
- Hank Bentley – producer (1, 7, 12, 14–174), engineer (1, 7, 12, 14)
- David Garcia – producer (2, 5, 7, 9, 12), engineer (2, 5, 7, 9, 12), mixing (2, 3)
- Solomon Olds – producer (3, 6)
- Ed Cash – producer (4, 8, 10, 11, 13), engineer (4, 8, 10, 11, 13), mixing (10, 11)
- Brian "BT" Transeau – producer (17)
- Jon Kaplan – mixing (1, 6, 7, 13, 14)
- Paul Rossetti – engineer (2, 5, 9, 12), mix assistant (2)
- Mark Endert – mixing (4, 8)
- Sean Moffitt – mixing (5, 9, 11)
- Tom Tapley – engineer (6)
- Neal Avron – mixing (12)
- Warren David – mix assistant (5, 9, 11)
- Nick Lobel – mix assistant (5, 9, 11)
- Scott Skrzynski – mix assistant (12)
- Joe LaPorta – mastering at Sterling Sound (New York, NY)
- Leighton Ching – art direction, design
- Toni Crowder – art direction
- Mike McCloskey – art direction, management
- Andrew Schoultz – cover painting
- Mary Caroline Mann – photography
- Eric Brown – photography

== Chart performance ==
Album

Chart (2016)	Peak position
US Billboard 200	12
US Top Christian Albums (Billboard)	1
