= All My Hope =

2017 single by Crowder

Single by Crowder featuring Tauren Wells
- Released: September 15, 2017
- Genre: Contemporary worship music
- Length: 3:52
- Label: Sparrow; Capitol CMG
- Songwriters: David Crowder; Ed Cash
- Producer: Ed Cash

Crowder singles chronology
"Back to the Garden" (2017)	"All My Hope" (2017)	"Red Letters" / "Wildfire" (2018)

Tauren Wells singles chronology
"Hills and Valleys" (2017)	"All My Hope" (2017)	"When We Pray" (2017)

Music video
- "All My Hope" on YouTube
- "All My Hope" (Lyrics) on YouTube

"All My Hope" is a song performed by American singer-songwriter Crowder featuring fellow American singer-songwriter Tauren Wells, released as a standalone single on September 8, 2017. Crowder had released the original version of the song on his second studio album, American Prodigal (2016). Crowder wrote the song alongside producer Ed Cash.

"All My Hope" peaked at No. 3 on the US Hot Christian Songs chart. "All My Hope" was nominated for the GMA Dove Awards for Song of the Year and Pop/Contemporary Recorded Song of the Year at the 2018 GMA Dove Awards.

== Background ==
The original version of "All My Hope" was released by Crowder as a track on his second studio album, American Prodigal, on September 23, 2016. Crowder shared the story behind the song, saying:

There's not a single one of us that can't identify with and understand what it feels like to be shackled and bound to something. We know we're not living in the freedom that we've been given through Christ. This song it's so hopeful because our hope is in something as grand as the salvific action of the one and only son of God. I got to see a physical manifestation of what that looks like to find physical freedom and that's what I want for my interior and that's what this song is all about. My hope is in Jesus.

== Composition ==
"All My Hope" is composed in the key of A♭ Major with a tempo of 127 beats per minute.

== Reception ==
=== Critical response ===
Joshua Andre of 365 Days of Inspiring Media gave a positive review of the single, saying the quickened tempo and added instrumentation made "a fuller sound and maybe a richness and a depth that isn't heard on the piano prominent original version." Andre also opined that Tauren Wells' vocals enhanced the song.

=== Accolades ===
Awards
Year	Organization	Award	Result	Ref.
2018	GMA Dove Awards	Song of the Year	Nominated	
2018	GMA Dove Awards	Pop/Contemporary Recorded Song of the Year	Nominated	

== Commercial performance ==
"All My Hope" debuted at number 43 on the US Christian Airplay chart dated September 2, 2017. "All My Hope" debuted at number 46 on the US Hot Christian Songs chart dated September 9, 2017, "All My Hope" peaked at number three on the Hot Christian Songs chart dated March 10, 2018, and spent a total of thirty-eight weeks on the chart. The song reached number one on the Christian Airplay chart dated March 17, 2018, becoming Crowder's second Christian Airplay number one single.

== Music videos ==
Crowder released audio video of "All My Hope" featuring Tauren Wells, showcasing the single artwork on YouTube on September 15, 2017. On October 20, 2017, Crowder released the official music video for "All My Hope" featuring Tauren Wells on YouTube. Crowder published the lyric video of "All My Hope" featuring Tauren Wells on October 25, 2017.

== Charts ==
=== Weekly charts ===
Weekly chart performance for "All My Hope"
Chart (2017–2018)	Peak position
US Hot Christian Songs (Billboard)	3
US Christian Airplay (Billboard)	1
US Christian AC (Billboard)	2

=== Year-end charts ===
Year-end chart performance for "All My Hope"
Chart (2017)	Position
US Christian Songs (Billboard)	72
Chart (2018)	Position
US Christian Songs (Billboard)	12
US Christian Airplay (Billboard)	16
US Christian AC (Billboard)	17

== Certifications ==
Region	Certification	Certified units/sales
United States (RIAA)	Platinum	1,000,000^{‡}
^{‡} Sales+streaming figures based on certification alone.

== Release history ==
Release dates and formats for "All My Hope"
Region	Date	Format	Label	Ref.
Various	September 8, 2017	Digital download; streaming	Sparrow; Capitol CMG	

== Other versions ==
- Passion released a live rendition of the song featuring Crowder and Tauren Wells on their album, Whole Heart (2018).
- Blues singer Robert Finley covered the song on his 2021 album Sharecropper's Son.
- Country singer Larry Fleet covered the song as a 2024 single release.
