= Wildfire (Crowder song) =

2018 single by Crowder

Single by Crowder

from the album I Know a Ghost
- A-side: "Red Letters"
- Released: September 19, 2018
- Genre: CCM; swamp rock; funk; dance; R&B
- Length: 3:14
- Label: Sparrow; Capitol CMG
- Songwriters: David Crowder; Rebecca Lauren Olds; Solomon Olds
- Producer: Tommee Profitt

Crowder singles chronology
"All My Hope" (2017)	"Red Letters" / "Wildfire" (2018)	"Testify" (2019)

Music videos
- "Wildfire" on YouTube
- "Wildfire" (Lyrics) on YouTube

"Wildfire" is a song performed by American contemporary Christian music singer Crowder. It was released as one of the first singles from his third studio album, I Know a Ghost (2018), alongside "Red Letters" on September 19, 2018. Crowder co-wrote the song with Rebecca Lauren Olds and Solomon Olds.

"Wildfire" peaked at No. 43 on the US Hot Christian Songs chart. "Wildfire" won the GMA Dove Award for Rock/Contemporary Recorded Song of the Year at the 2019 GMA Dove Awards.

== Background ==
Crowder released "Wildfire" alongside "Red Letters" in September 2018 as the first singles from his studio album I Know a Ghost, which was slated for release on November 9, 2018.

== Composition ==
"Wildfire" is composed in the key of G♯ minor with a tempo of 91 beats per minute, and a musical time signature of 4/4. The song has a swamp rock sound, which also incorporates funk, dance and R&B, and is "complete with a chorus of crickets, frogs & other creatures interspersed throughout the track," as Crowder "relays to us the notion that wildfire from Jesus set us free from sin."

== Reception ==
=== Critical response ===
Robert Crawford of Rolling Stone praised the single, describing it as "a loud, club-worthy banger doubling as a church anthem." Joshua Andre of 365 Days of Inspiring Media gave a review of "Wildfire", describing the song as being "experimental as ever," and concluding "It's a bit from left field to hear Crowder half-screaming in the chorus, yet I am sure that this song will grow on me in the future."

=== Accolades ===
Awards
Year	Organization	Award	Result	Ref.
2019	GMA Dove Awards	Rock/Contemporary Recorded Song of the Year	Won	

== Commercial performance ==
"Wildfire" debuted at number 43 on the US Hot Christian Songs chart dated November 24, 2018.

== Music videos ==
Crowder released audio video of "Wildfire" showcasing the single artwork through YouTube on September 19, 2018. Crowder published the lyric video of "Wildfire" via YouTube on October 12, 2018. On March 13, 2019, Crowder released the official music video for "Wildfire" on YouTube.

== Track listing ==
"Red Letters" / "Wildfire"
No.	Title	Writer(s)	Producer(s)	Length
1.	"Red Letters"	David Crowder	Ed Cash; Tommee Profitt	3:48
2.	"Wildfire"	Crowder; Rebecca Lauren Olds; Solomon Olds	Tommee Profitt	3:14
Total length:				7:02

== Charts ==
Weekly chart performance for "Wildfire"
Chart (2018)	Peak position
US Hot Christian Songs (Billboard)	43

== Release history ==
Release dates and formats for "Wildfire"
Region	Date	Format	Label	Ref.
Various	September 19, 2018	Digital download; streaming	Sparrow; Capitol CMG	
