= I Know a Ghost =

2018 studio album by Crowder

Studio album by Crowder
- Released: November 9, 2018
- Recorded: 2018
- Studios: Tommee Profitt Studios and Ed's (Franklin, Tennessee); Bentley Street Studios and Yoda's Palace Studios (Nashville, Tennessee)
- Genres: Contemporary Christian music; contemporary worship; hip hop; country
- Length: 61:15
- Labels: Sixsteps; Sparrow
- Producers: David Crowder; Tommee Profitt; Ed Cash; Solomon Olds; Brendon Coe; Hank Bentley

Crowder chronology
American Prodigal (2016)	I Know a Ghost (2018)	Milk & Honey (2021)

Singles from I Know a Ghost
- 1. "Red Letters" Released: September 19, 2018; 2. "Wildfire" Released: September 19, 2018; 3. "Let It Rain (Is There Anybody)" Released: May 31, 2019; 4. "I'm Leaning on You" Released: February 14, 2020; 5. "Night Like This" Released: May 15, 2020

I Know a Ghost is the third studio album by American Contemporary Christian musician Crowder. The album was released on November 9, 2018, via Sixsteps and Sparrow Records. The album features guest appearances by TAYA, Mandisa, Riley Clemmons, JR, and Social Club Misfits. Crowder collaborated with Tommee Profitt, Ed Cash, Solomon Olds, Brendon Coe, and Hank Bentley in the production of the album.

The album was supported by the release of five singles: "Red Letters", "Wildfire", "Let It Rain (Is There Anybody)", "I'm Leaning on You" and "Night Like This".

I Know a Ghost was released to critical acclaim, and also became a commercially successful album upon its release, debuting at No. 2 on Billboard's Top Christian Albums Chart in the United States. I Know a Ghost was nominated for the GMA Dove Award Pop/Contemporary Album of the Year at the 2019 GMA Dove Awards, and the Grammy Award for Best Contemporary Christian Music Album at the 2020 Grammy Awards.

== Background ==
In September 2018, Crowder announced that his studio album I Know a Ghost, set to be the follow-up to American Prodigal (2016), was slated for release on November 9, 2018, with the issuing of singles "Red Letters" and "Wildfire" in the lead-up to the album's release. Crowder attributed his influences in making the music on the album to the Southern hip hop scene in Atlanta, as well as books such as Slave Songs of the United States, African American Heritage Hymnal and others.

== Music and lyrics ==
According to Timothy Monger of AllMusic, the sound of the album as ranges from "porch-stomping folk and country to electronica, hip hop, and more straightforward worship pop." Jonathan Andre of 365 Days of Inspiring Media referred to the album as "worship/country/bluegrass project." John Barber of CCM Magazine called the album a "South-ern rock record." Michael Weaver of Jesus Freak Hideout observed that while "I Know a Ghost has some of that same swamp rock sound," it's "overwhelming musical theme here is hip-hop." Timothy Yap of JubileeCast said of the album: "This record is a melting pot of an array of diverse sounds from nu-folk, rock, African native chants, country, EDM, bluegrass and pop," describing the sounds as a mixture of Rend Collective, Stryper, and Chris Tomlin. Kelly Meade of Today's Christian Entertainment noted the "diverse blend of genres ranging from gospel, to rock, to country to rap and everything in between."

"I Know a Ghost" is the first track on the album, a "stirring 2 minute guitar led opener," where Crowder is "wrestling with the notion that he still stuffs up and still makes mistakes, and still does the pig headed things he does even if he does know 'a ghost' aka Jesus Christ." This is followed by "Wildfire" which has a swamp rock sound, that is "complete with a chorus of crickets, frogs & other creatures interspersed throughout the track," as Crowder "relays to us the notion that wildfire from Jesus set us free from sin." "Golgotha Hill (King of Love)" is "an acoustic guitar led slow ballad," with "a little of that hip-hop feel," which narrates "a graphic depiction of Jesus being whipped and tortured on the way to the cross." "Crushing Snakes" has a "trap-like beat" while the singers conjure up "images of warriors ready for battle as we face the world with God on our side knowing He has the ultimate victory in the end." "Red Letters" is a "typical Crowder radio song," which speaks of "Christ's salvific work." "Let It Rain (Is There Anybody)" has "a 70s-soul feel updated with a current R&B soul," with the singers highlighting "the importance of keeping the Lord at the center of everything in your life." "Everyday I'm Blessed" is "gospel infused with a hymn like structure." "I'm Leaning on You" is an "R&B flavored" track. "No Rival" is an "electronic prominent guitar led mid-tempo ballad," which "has reverberations of native African chants with the call and response from Crowder and a choir of male voices." "Child of God" has "banjo-plucking, foot-stomping strains" of Southern music. "Happy Day" is a "frenetic banjo led" song. "Night Like This" is a "full-on country" track, with a campfire singalong feel reminiscent of Rend Collective. "La Luz" is a "part southern, part hip-hop, and part Latin" song. "The Sinner's Cure" is a song that "runs the gamut from piano balladry to heavy rock to EDM," which "prompts your heart to ponder the big questions in life that we all can struggle with at times as you come to God in prayer." "Hundred Miles" is a worship song, about "giving thanks for God's merciful love that will never fail us." "Ghost" is the closing track on the album, that is infused with "country/southern gospel/jazz/pop/rock/worship," and is "an ode to the power of the Holy Spirit."

== Release and promotion ==
=== Singles ===
On September 19, 2018, Crowder released "Red Letters" and "Wildfire" as the first two singles from the album. The music video for "Red Letters" was released on October 30, 2018. The music video for "Wildfire" was released on March 13, 2019.

On May 31, 2019, "Let It Rain (Is There Anybody)" featuring Mandisa was released to Christian radio in the United States, as the third single from the album. The music video for "Let It Rain (Is There Anybody)" was released on June 7, 2019.

On February 14, 2020, Crowder released "I'm Leaning on You" featuring Riley Clemmons as the fourth single from the album.

On May 15, 2020, Crowder released "Night Like This" as the fifth and final single from the album.

=== Promotional singles ===
On November 2, 2018, Crowder released "Let It Rain (Is There Anybody)" featuring Mandisa as a promotional single, concurrently launching the album's pre-order.

== Reception ==
=== Critical response ===
Professional ratings
Review scores
Source	Rating
365 Days of Inspiring Media	4.5/5
CCM Magazine	4.5/5 stars
ChurchMag	5/5 stars
Jesus Freak Hideout	3.5/5 stars
JubileeCast	3/5
Today's Christian Entertainment	4.5/5 stars

Jonathan Andre in his 365 Days of Inspiring Media review opined that despite the length of I Know a Ghost, he enjoyed the album, although some tracks would be better suited on a deluxe edition or digital only release. CCM Magazine's John Barber gave a favourable review of the album, saying, "I Know a Ghost is a powerful collection of Crowder at his very best, pulling from varied styles to make a record that feels the haunting of the Holy Spirit all over it." Phil Schneider, reviewing for ChurchMag, applauding Crowder for the album, saying "Crowder continues not to reinvent himself but to expand himself and his artistry." Kelly Meade indicated her praise in a review at Today's Christian Entertainment, commending Crowder for his eclectic approach to music, saying "I Know A Ghost offers all of this and more as it takes you from celebrating the joys of life to deeply reflective moments that urge you to pause and focus on your relationship with your Savior and time spent with Him."

Jesus Freak Hideout's Michael Weaver says in his lacklustre review: "Crowder has never really played by all of the rules, but has always been accepted and cherished regardless. His creativity is off the charts, but I Know a Ghost is a mixed bag of solid swings and some clear misses." Timothy Yap of JubileeCast wrote in his review of the album: "In short, top marks go to Crowder for colouring outside the lines. But if you are looking for a worship album to listen to again and again with tunes made for the church, not sure this is the one."

=== Accolades ===
Awards
Year	Organization	Award	Result	Ref.
2019	GMA Dove Awards	Pop/Contemporary Album of the Year	Nominated	
2020	Grammy Awards	Best Contemporary Christian Music Album	Nominated	

== Commercial performance ==
In the United States, I Know a Ghost earned 15,000 equivalent album units in its first week of sales, and as a result debuted at No. 2 on the Top Christian Albums Chart dated November 24, 2018. The album concurrently registered on the mainstream Billboard 200 chart at No. 43.

== Track listing ==
I Know a Ghost
No.	Title	Writer(s)	Producer(s)	Length
1.	"I Know a Ghost"	David Crowder	David Crowder; Tommee Profitt	2:50
2.	"Wildfire"	Crowder; Rebecca Lauren Olds; Solomon Olds	Tommee Profitt	3:14
3.	"Golgotha Hill (King of Love)"	Crowder; Ed Cash; Profitt	Ed Cash; Tommee Profitt	4:47
4.	"Crushing Snakes" (featuring TAYA)	Coal Dye; Crowder; E. Cash; Martin Cash	Ed Cash	5:01
5.	"Red Letters"	Crowder; E. Cash	Ed Cash; Tommee Profitt	3:48
6.	"Let It Rain (Is There Anybody)" (featuring Mandisa)	Crowder; E. Cash	Ed Cash	3:29
7.	"Everyday I'm Blessed"	Crowder; S. Olds	Solomon Olds	3:20
8.	"I'm Leaning on You" (featuring Riley Clemmons)	Brenton Brown; Chris McClarney; Crowder; Hank Bentley	Tommee Profitt	3:34
9.	"No Rival" (featuring JR)	Chad Mattson; Crowder; Bentley; JR Collins; Jonathan Lowry	Tommee Profitt	4:26
10.	"Child of God"	Crowder; E. Cash; S. Olds	David Crowder; Ed Cash; Solomon Olds	2:47
11.	"Happy Day"	Crowder; E. Cash; S. Olds	Ed Cash	2:14
12.	"Night Like This"	Crowder	Solomon Olds	3:15
13.	"La Luz" (featuring Social Club Misfits)	Brendon Coe; Crowder; E. Cash; Fernando Miranda; Martin Santiago	Brendon Coe; Ed Cash	4:19
14.	"The Sinner's Cure"	Crowder	Tommee Profitt	4:05
15.	"Hundred Miles"	Brian Macdonald; Judah Akers; Nathan Zuercher	Hank Bentley	5:21
16.	"Ghost"	Crowder; E. Cash	David Crowder; Ed Cash	4:39
Total length:				61:15

== Personnel ==
- David Crowder – vocals, acoustic guitar (1), all instruments (1), all programming (1), backing vocals (8, 9, 14), additional programming (15)
- Tommee Profitt – all instruments (1, 8, 14), all programming (1, 8, 14), programming (3, 5)
- Solomon Olds – organ (2, 7), clavinet (2), programming (2, 7, 10, 12), acoustic guitar (2, 7, 12), banjo (2, 7, 12), bass (2, 7, 10, 12), drums (2, 7, 10, 12), harmonica (2), arrangements (2, 7), acoustic piano (7), pedal steel guitar (12)
- Ed Cash – additional programming (3–6, 10, 13), guitars (3–6, 10, 11, 13), backing vocals (3–6, 10, 11, 13), banjo (10, 11, 13), programming (11), mandolin (11)
- Martin Cash – keyboards (4), programming (4), backing vocals (4)
- Jeremy Lutito – programming (4)
- Brendon Coe – programming (6, 13)
- Kevin Rooney – additional programming (15), percussion (15)
- Kenny Hutson – lap steel guitar (2), mandolin (2, 12, 15), banjo (15)
- Jacob Arnold – drums (15), percussion (15)
- Aubrey Haynie – fiddle (3, 5, 10, 11), mandolin (10)
- Laura Musten Sink – violin (12)
- Franni Cash – backing vocals (3, 6)
- TAYA – vocals (4)
- Mandisa – vocals (6)
- Riley Clemmons – backing vocals (8)
- Hank Bentley – backing vocals (8, 9, 15), guitars (9, 15), acoustic piano (15), keyboards (15), Hammond B3 organ (15), programming (15), lap steel guitar (15), resonator guitar (15), bouzouki (15)
- JR – rap (9), backing vocals (14)
- Social Club Misfits – rap (13)
- Colton Price – backing vocals (15)

== Production ==
- Louie Giglio – executive producer
- Shelley Giglio – executive producer, art direction, management
- Brad O'Donnell – executive producer
- Jonathan Sell – additional A&R direction
- Michael Guy Chislett – additional vocal production (4)
- Tommee Profitt – mixing (1, 8, 9, 14)
- Solomon Olds – engineer (2, 7, 12), mixing (2, 7, 12)
- David Crowder – vocal engineer (2, 7, 12)
- Sean Moffitt – mixing (3–6, 10, 11, 12, 15, 16)
- Jacob Arnold – engineer (15)
- Hank Bentley – engineer (15)
- Kevin Rooney – engineer (15), editing (15)
- Warren David – mix assistant (3–6, 10, 11, 13, 15, 16)
- Daniel Mikesell – mix assistant (3–6, 10, 11, 13, 15, 16)
- Christian Pascal – additional engineer (12)
- Colton Price – editing (15)
- Joe LaPorta – mastering at Sterling Sound (New York, NY)
- Leighton Ching – art direction, design
- Toni Crowder – art direction
- Josh Keyes – cover painting
- Eric Brown – photography
- Tyler Hays – type treatment
- Mike McCloskey – management

== Charts ==
=== Weekly charts ===
Weekly chart performance for I Know a Ghost
Chart (2021)	Peak position
US Billboard 200	43
US Top Christian Albums (Billboard)	2

=== Year-end charts ===
Year-end chart performance for I Know a Ghost
Chart (2019)	Position
US Christian Albums (Billboard)	19
Chart (2020)	Position
US Christian Albums (Billboard)	48

== Release history ==
Release history and formats for I Know a Ghost
Region	Date	Format(s)	Label(s)	Ref.
Various	November 9, 2018	CD; Digital download; streaming	Sixsteps; Sparrow Records	
