= Milk & Honey (Crowder album) =

2021 studio album by Crowder

Studio album by Crowder
- Released: June 11, 2021
- Recorded: 2020
- Genre: Contemporary Christian music; contemporary worship
- Length: 41:40
- Label: Sixsteps; Sparrow
- Producer: Ben Glover; Jeff Sojka; Hank Bentley; Jeff Pardo; Zach Paradis; Solomon Olds; Tommee Profitt

Crowder chronology
I Know a Ghost (2018)	Milk & Honey (2021)	The Exile (2024)

Singles from Milk & Honey
- 1. "Good God Almighty" Released: January 15, 2021; 2. "In the House" Released: August 27, 2021; 3. "God Really Loves Us" Released: June 3, 2022

Milk & Honey is the fourth studio album by American contemporary Christian musician Crowder. The album was released on June 11, 2021, via Sixsteps and Sparrow Records. A deluxe edition of the album was released on March 4, 2022. The album features guest appearances by Hulvey, Maverick City Music, and Dante Bowe. The album was produced by Ben Glover, Jeff Sojka, Hank Bentley, Jeff Pardo, Zach Paradis, Solomon Olds, and Tommee Profitt.

The album has been supported by the release of "Good God Almighty," "In the House," and "God Really Loves Us" as singles. "Good God Almighty" peaked at No. 17 on Billboard's Bubbling Under Hot 100 chart and No. 1 on the Hot Christian Songs chart. "In the House" peaked at No. 19 on the Bubbling Under Hot 100 chart and No. 1 on the Hot Christian Songs chart. "God Really Loves Us" peaked at No. 3 on the US Hot Christian Songs chart. "He Is", the album's title track, and "The Anchor" were released as promotional singles. Milk & Honey will also be promoted by the Milk & Honey Tour across the United States.

Milk & Honey became a commercially successful album upon its release, debuting at number one on Billboard's Top Christian Albums Chart in the United States, and at number ten on the Official Charts' Official Christian & Gospel Albums Chart in the United Kingdom. At the 2021 GMA Dove Awards, "Good God Almighty" was nominated for the GMA Dove Award Pop/Contemporary Recorded Song of the Year. At the 2022 GMA Dove Awards, Milk & Honey received two GMA Dove Award nominations for Pop/Contemporary Album of the Year and Recorded Music Packaging of the Year, while "Good God Almighty" was nominated for Song of the Year.

== Background ==
On March 18, 2021, Crowder announced via social media that he will be releasing Milk & Honey on June 11, 2021. The album title was inspired by the promise of God bringing Israelites up out of Egypt and leading them into Canaan, a land "flowing with milk and honey" as documented in the Book of Exodus. On April 30, 2021, Crowder released the track listing of the album.

Crowder shared in an interview with American Songwriter, that the album was inspired a gold ring that was branded "mac 'n' cheese" on Etsy, which he then reimagined with the title Milk & Honey as the album cover. Crowder released the deluxe edition of the album on March 4, 2022. The deluxe edition six new tracks, five being new versions of previously released songs and a new song titled "King" featuring Maverick City Gospel Choir.

== Release and promotion ==
=== Singles ===
"Good God Almighty" was released as the lead single of the album on January 15, 2021. The song reached No. 1 on the US Hot Christian Songs chart, becoming Crowder's first chart-topping hit on the chart. "Good God Almighty" also peaked at No. 17 on the Bubbling Under Hot 100 chart. "Good God Almighty" received a nomination for the GMA Dove Award Pop/Contemporary Recorded Song of the Year at the 2021 GMA Dove Awards, and the GMA Dove Award Song of the Year at the 2022 GMA Dove Awards.

"In the House" was released as the second single of the album on August 27, 2021. "In the House" reached No. 1 on the Hot Christian Songs chart, and peaked at No. 19 on the Bubbling Under Hot 100 chart.

"God Really Loves Us" was released as the third single from the album on June 3, 2022. "God Really Loves Us" peaked at No. 9 on the US Hot Christian Songs chart.

=== Promotional singles ===
"He Is" was released on March 26, 2021, as the first promotional single from the album, concurrently launching the album's pre-order. The song peaked at No. 30 on the Hot Christian Songs chart.

"Milk & Honey" was released on April 23, 2021, as the second promotional single from the album. The song peaked at No. 37 on the Hot Christian Songs chart.

"The Anchor" was released on May 28, 2021, as the third and final promotional single from the album.

== Touring ==
On May 10, 2021, Crowder announced his Milk & Honey Tour to support the album. The tour featured Sean Curran and Chidima performing on select dates. The tour ran from September 30 to November 22, 2021, with Crowder performing over 30 shows across the United States, beginning at the Smoky Mountain Center for the Performing Arts in Franklin, North Carolina, and ending the tour at the Rapides Parish Coliseum in Alexandria, Louisiana.

== Reception ==
=== Critical response ===
Professional ratings
Review scores
Source	Rating
Jesus Freak Hideout	4.5/5 stars
JubileeCast	4.5/5
Louder Than the Music	5/5 stars
Today's Christian Entertainment	4.3/5 stars

Jesus Freak Hideout's Alex Caldwell in his favourable review of the album lauded Crowder for "ability to mix and match eras and genres into a musical stew that is all his own," further concluding: "Milk & Honey may not be groundbreaking next to Crowder's own impressive musical history, but it is no less welcome a return." Timothy Yap of JubileeCast praised the album, saying Milk & Honey is "Crowder's most diverse and best album to date." Yap also praised the lyricism, saying "the songs show theological depth and pastoral sensitivity." In a positive review for Worship Leader, Caitlin Lassiter said of the album: "Milk & Honey is yet another project that proves why Crowder is one of the most profound worship leaders of our time. Creative yet authentic, this record captures the best parts of both the high-energy and the more intimate sides of worship." In a NewReleaseToday review, JJ Francesco spoke of the album, saying "Crowder is always reliable for putting out albums that stand out from the pack. Milk & Honey is no exception and will surely be one of 2021's landmark releases in the genre." Jono Davies, reviewing for Louder Than the Music, said, "For me and this is a very bold statement but I think this album is Crowder's most complete album as a solo artist. This album feels current, creative but most of all it's an album that is built around love - this comes over so much in the lyrics. Great job Crowder." Kelly Meade, commended Crowder in a review at Today's Christian Entertainment, saying "Throughout Milk & Honey Crowder's uniqueness shines with each song vocally and on the production level as well. As you listen to the album, you hear a musically diverse collection that features something for everyone all while maintaining a solid focus on a relationship with our Creator on a deeply personal level."

=== Accolades ===
Awards
Year	Organization	Award	Result	Ref
2022	GMA Dove Awards	Pop/Contemporary Album of the Year	Nominated	
2022	GMA Dove Awards	Recorded Music Packaging of the Year	Nominated	

Year-end lists
Publication	Accolade	Rank	Ref.
NewReleaseToday	Best of 2021: Top 10 Albums of the Year	—N/a	

== Commercial performance ==
In the United States, Milk & Honey earned 13,000 equivalent album units in its first week of sales, and as a result debuted at No. 1 on the Top Christian Albums Chart dated June 26, 2021, becoming Crowder's third No. 1 entry on the chart.

== Track listing ==
Milk & Honey
No.	Title	Writer(s)	Producer(s)	Length
1.	"Good God Almighty"	David Crowder; Jeff Sojka; Ben Glover	Ben Glover; Jeff Sojka	3:11
2.	"In the House"	Crowder; Sojka; Glover	Ben Glover; Jeff Sojka	2:59
3.	"He Is"	Crowder; Hank Bentley; Jeff Pardo	Hank Bentley; Jeff Pardo	3:46
4.	"Milk & Honey"	Crowder; Bentley; Seth Philpott	Hank Bentley; Zach Paradis	3:46
5.	"Higher Power" (featuring Hulvey)	Crowder; Solomon Olds; Rebecca Lauren Olds; Christopher Michael Hulvey; Glover; Sojka	Ben Glover; Jeff Sojka; Solomon Olds	2:57
6.	"Sweet Jesus" (with Maverick City Music)	Crowder; S. Olds; R.L. Olds; Glover; Sojka	Ben Glover; Jeff Sojka	3:10
7.	"God Really Loves Us" (with Dante Bowe, featuring Maverick City Music)	Dante Bowe; Crowder; Glover; Sojka	Ben Glover; Jeff Sojka	4:23
8.	"Who's Gonna Stop the King"	Crowder; Colby Wedgeworth; Jordan Sapp; Glover; Sojka	Ben Glover; Jeff Sojka	3:00
9.	"Better Than Sunshine"	Crowder; Sojka; Glover	Ben Glover; Jeff Sojka	3:20
10.	"Glory, Glory (God Is Able)"	Crowder; Ed Cash; Traditional	Ben Glover; Jeff Sojka	2:59
11.	"Hallelujah for Every Broken Heart"	Crowder; Bear Rinehart; Cash	Ben Glover; Jeff Sojka	3:43
12.	"The Anchor"	Crowder; Tommee Profitt	Tommee Profitt	4:26
Total length:				41:40

Milk & Honey – Apple Music bonus content
No.	Title	Length
13.	"Good God Almighty" (music video)	3:14
Total length:		44:54

Milk & Honey (Deluxe Edition)
No.	Title	Writer(s)	Producer(s)	Length
13.	"King" (featuring Maverick City Gospel Choir)	Crowder; Sojka; Glover	Ben Glover; Jeff Sojka	3:21
14.	"Milk & Honey" (Paradis Remix)			3:23
15.	"God Really Loves Us" (Live From Passion 2022; with Passion and Chidima)			4:26
16.	"In the House" (Radio Version)			3:10
17.	"In the House" (Acoustic)			3:00
18.	"In the House" (Austin City Limits Live)			3:08
Total length:				62:14

Milk & Honey (Deluxe Edition) – Apple Music bonus content
No.	Title	Length
19.	"In the House" (Austin City Limits Live; music video)	3:03
Total length:		65:17

== Personnel ==
- Adam Ayan – mastering (tracks 1–12)
- Dante Bowe – primary artist (track 7)
- Dave Claus – mixing (tracks 1, 3, 10–11)
- Crowder – primary artist (tracks 1–12)
- Ben Glover – producer (tracks 1–2, 5–12)
- Hulvey – featured artist (track 5)
- Maverick City Music – primary artist (track 6), featured artist (track 7)
- Jacob "Biz" Morris – mixing (track 4)
- Tommee Profitt – mixing, producer (track 12)
- Jeff Sojka – mixing (tracks 2, 5, 7), producer (tracks 1–2, 5–12)
- Doug Weier – mixing (tracks 6, 8–9)

== Charts ==
=== Weekly charts ===
Weekly chart performance for Milk & Honey
Chart (2021)	Peak position
UK Christian & Gospel Albums (OCC)	10
US Billboard 200	59
US Top Christian Albums (Billboard)	1

=== Year-end charts ===
Year-end chart performance for Milk & Honey
Chart (2021)	Position
US Christian Albums (Billboard)	40
Chart (2022)	Position
US Christian Albums (Billboard)	25
Chart (2023)	Position
US Christian Albums (Billboard)	30

== Release history ==
Release history and formats for Milk & Honey
Region	Date	Version	Format(s)	Label(s)	Ref.
Various	June 11, 2021	Standard	CD; Digital download; streaming	Sixsteps; Sparrow Records	
Various	March 4, 2022	Deluxe	CD; Digital download; streaming	Sixsteps; Sparrow Records	
