= I'm Leaning on You =

2020 single by Crowder

Single by Crowder featuring Riley Clemmons

from the album I Know a Ghost
- Released: February 14, 2020
- Genre: CCM; R&B
- Length: 3:34; 3:26 (radio version)
- Label: Sparrow; Capitol CMG
- Songwriter(s): Brenton Brown; Chris McClarney; David Crowder; Hank Bentley
- Producer(s): Tommee Profitt; Jordan Sapp

Crowder singles chronology
"Home" (2019)	"I'm Leaning on You" (2020)	"Night Like This" (2020)

Riley Clemmons singles chronology
"Free" (2019)	"I'm Leaning on You" (2020)	"Over and Over" (2020)

Music videos
- "I'm Leaning on You" (Lyrics) on YouTube

"I'm Leaning on You" is a song performed by American contemporary Christian music singer Crowder featuring Riley Clemmons. It was released on February 14, 2020, as the fourth single from his third studio album, I Know a Ghost (2018). Crowder co-wrote the song with Brenton Brown, Chris McClarney and Hank Bentley.

"I'm Leaning on You" peaked at No. 19 on the US Hot Christian Songs chart.

== Background ==
Crowder had an interview with Kevin Davis, lead contributor at NewReleaseToday, talking about the song and the inspiration behind it, saying:

I grew up in a Southern Baptist church and we sang "Leaning on the Everlasting Arms" constantly and it was one of my favorite songs as a kid. We would often close out our church service with that song. I don't think we remind ourselves enough that when things get rough, just like the childlike faith we had as kids, that we can lean on Jesus. It's as simple as that. We need to sing that when we are kids and when we are adults. After you've gone through a bit of life, that's a necessity. I was researching the hymn and it turns out that the guy who wrote it, Anthony Showalter, was a school teacher and he had received letters from his former students saying that their wives had died, and in writing letters of consolation, Showalter was inspired by the phrase in Deuteronomy 33:27, "The eternal God is thy refuge, and underneath are the everlasting arms." That's where I started from in writing this song. I'm trying to say something that inspired me as a kid which is simplistic and childlike in faith, and at the same time with deep-rooted truth. It's more than just propositional truth now, it's something meaningful and true in my life, being able to say that now.

== Composition ==
"I'm Leaning on You" is an "R&B flavored" song, composed in the key of A with a tempo of 70 beats per minute and a musical time signature of 4/4.

== Critical reception ==
Toby Fournier of Cross Rhythms gave a positive review of the song, saying, "Bare piano chords open the song with David Crowder coming in to deliver his message of hope, which gradually rises to a crescendo and features some killer backing vocals on the chorus and a chord progression that lifts the whole affair sky high."

== Commercial performance ==
"I'm Leaning on You" debuted at number 35 on the US Hot Christian Songs chart dated February 29, 2020. The song peaked at number 19 on the Hot Christian Songs chart dated June 6, 2020, and has spent a total of twenty-five consecutive weeks on the chart.

== Music videos ==
Crowder released the audio video of "I'm Leaning on You" showcasing the I Know a Ghost album artwork through YouTube on November 9, 2018. On February 14, 2020, Crowder released the audio video for the radio version of "I'm Leaning on You" on YouTube. Crowder published the lyric video of "I'm Leaning on You" via YouTube on April 24, 2020.

== Track listing ==
"I'm Leaning on You"
No.	Title	Producer(s)	Length
1.	"I'm Leaning on You" (featuring Riley Clemmons; Radio Version)	Jordan Sapp; Tommee Profitt	3:26
2.	"I'm Leaning on You" (featuring Riley Clemmons)	Tommee Profitt	3:34
Total length:			7:00

== Charts ==
=== Weekly charts ===
Weekly chart performance for "I'm Leaning on You"
Chart (2020)	Peak position
US Christian Songs (Billboard)	19
US Christian Airplay (Billboard)	15
US Christian AC (Billboard)	16

=== Year-end charts ===
Year-end chart performance for "I'm Leaning on You"
Chart (2020)	Position
US Christian Songs (Billboard)	46
US Christian Airplay (Billboard)	44
US Christian AC (Billboard)	44

== Release history ==
Release dates and formats for "I'm Leaning on You"
Region	Date	Format	Label	Ref.
Various	February 14, 2020	Digital download; streaming	Sparrow; Capitol CMG	

== Other versions ==
- Passion released "I'm Leaning on You" featuring Crowder and Chidima on their live album, Roar (Live From Passion 2020).
