= Nights Like This =

Nights Like This may refer to:

== Music ==
=== Albums and EPs ===
- Nights Like This (album), 1989 album by Stacey Q
- Nights Like This, 2014 album by Eli "Paperboy" Reed
- Nights Like This, 2011 EP by Icona Pop

=== Songs ===
- "Nights Like This" (Kehlani song), 2019
- "Nights Like This" (The Kid Laroi song), 2023
- "Nights Like This", song by After 7
- "Nights Like This", song by Future and Metro Boomin from the album We Still Don't Trust You, 2024
- "Nights Like This", song by Icona Pop from the album Icona Pop, 2012

== See also ==
- Night Like This (disambiguation)
- A Night Like This (disambiguation)
