= In the House (song) =

2021 single by Crowder

Single by Crowder

from the album Milk & Honey
- Released: August 27, 2021
- Genre: CCM; Worship
- Length: 2:59; 3:09 (radio version); 2:59 (acoustic)
- Label: Sparrow; Capitol CMG
- Songwriter(s): David Crowder; Jeff Sojka; Ben Glover
- Producer(s): Jeff Sojka; Ben Glover

Crowder singles chronology
| "Good God Almighty" (2021) | "In the House" (2021) | "My Jesus" (2021) |

Music videos
- "In the House" on YouTube
- "In the House" (Lyrics) on YouTube

"In the House" is a song performed by American contemporary Christian music singer Crowder, released on August 27, 2021, as the second single from his fourth studio album, Milk & Honey (2021). Crowder co-wrote the song with Jeff Sojka and Ben Glover.

"In the House" peaked at No. 1 on the US Hot Christian Songs chart. The song also went on to peak at No. 19 on the Bubbling Under Hot 100 chart.

== Background ==
Crowder released "In the House" as the second single from Milk & Honey (2021), following the hit lead single of the album "Good God Almighty" which became his first No. 1 single on the Hot Christian Songs chart. Crowder shared the story behind the song, saying:

Psalm 122:1 says, 'I was glad when they said unto me let us go into the house of the Lord.' It's great that there is a house of the Lord that we can go to, but what's amazing about it is that we get to be in the house. Anybody who walks through the door is welcome and the grace of God extends to everyone no matter how far you've gone. There's home waiting. That's what this verse means to me.

== Composition ==
"In the House" is composed in the key of B with a tempo of 77.5 beats per minute and a musical time signature of 4/4.

== Commercial performance ==
Following the release of Milk & Honey, "In the House" debuted at No. 49 on the US Hot Christian Songs chart dated June 26, 2021. After the song's release as a single, "In the House" debuted on at No. 40 on the Christian Airplay chart dated September 4, 2021. "In the House" reached No. 1 on the Hot Christian Songs chart dated March 12, 2022. "In the House" also peaked at No. 1 on the Christian Airplay chart dated February 26, 2022.

== Music video ==
On June 11, 2021, Crowder released the official lyric video for "In the House" on YouTube. Crowder published the official music video of the song via YouTube on November 10, 2021.

== Track listing ==
"In the House"
| No. | Title | Length |
|---|---|---|
| 1. | "In the House" | 2:59 |
| 2. | "In the House" (radio version) | 3:09 |
| 3. | "In the House" (acoustic) | 2:59 |
| Total length: | | 9:07 |

== Personnel ==
Adapted from AllMusic.

- Adam Ayan – mastering engineer
- Dallan Beck – editing
- Jesse Brock – mixing assistant
- Crowder – primary artist
- Warren David – mixing assistant
- Alex Dobbert – mastering engineer
- Ben Glover – acoustic guitar, background vocals, banjo, Dobro, editing, electric guitar, engineer, keyboards, producer, programmer
- Jerry McPherson – electric guitar
- Sean Moffitt – mixing
- Jeff Sojka – editing, electric guitar, engineer, keyboards, mixing, producer, programmer
- Doug Weier – mixing

== Charts ==
=== Weekly charts ===
Weekly chart performance for "In the House"
| Chart (2021–2022) | Peak position |
|---|---|
| US Bubbling Under Hot 100 Singles (Billboard) | 19 |
| US Christian Songs (Billboard) | 1 |
| US Christian Airplay (Billboard) | 1 |
| US Christian AC (Billboard) | 1 |

=== Year-end charts ===
Year-end chart performance for "In the House"
| Chart (2021) | Position |
|---|---|
| US Christian Songs (Billboard) | 90 |
| Chart (2022) | Position |
| US Christian Songs (Billboard) | 9 |
| US Christian Airplay (Billboard) | 4 |
| US Christian AC (Billboard) | 9 |

== Release history ==
Release dates and formats for "In the House"
| Region | Date | Format | Label | Ref. |
|---|---|---|---|---|
| Various | August 27, 2021 | Digital download; streaming | Sparrow; Capitol CMG | |
| United States | August 27, 2021 | Christian radio | Sparrow; Capitol CMG | |
