= Night Like This (Crowder song) =

2020 single by Crowder

Single by Crowder

from the album I Know a Ghost
- Released: May 15, 2020
- Genre: CCM; country
- Label: Sparrow; Capitol CMG
- Songwriter(s): David Crowder
- Producer(s): Solomon Olds; David Crowder

Crowder singles chronology
"I'm Leaning on You" (2020)	"Night Like This" (2020)	"Good God Almighty" (2021)

Music videos
- "Nights Like This" (Audio) on YouTube

"Night Like This" is a song performed by American contemporary Christian music singer Crowder. It was released on May 15, 2020, as the fifth and final single from his third studio album, I Know a Ghost (2018). Crowder wrote the song.

"Night Like This" peaked at No. 47 on the US Hot Christian Songs chart.

== Composition ==
"Night Like This" is a "full-on country" track, with a campfire singalong feel reminiscent of Rend Collective. The song is composed in the key of E with a tempo of 92.18 beats per minute and a musical time signature of 4/4.

== Critical reception ==
Joshua Andre of 365 Days of Inspiring Media gave a poor review of "Night Like This", saying the original version of the song "sadly is a misstep," as Crowder's voice does fit at all on a full-on country song, also opining that while the three renditions "are quite compelling," the songs do "get old quickly."

== Commercial performance ==
"Night Like This" debuted at number 47 on the US Hot Christian Songs chart dated May 30, 2020.

== Music videos ==
Crowder released audio video of "Night Like This" showcasing the I Know a Ghost album artwork through YouTube on November 9, 2018. On May 15, 2020, Crowder published via YouTube, the visualisers of the "Night Like This" Red Dirt Drip Mix, and Country Fried Mix, as well as the audio video of the Sundown Time mix.

== Track listing ==
"Night Like This"
No.	Title	Producer(s)	Length
1.	"Night Like This" (Red Dirt Drip Mix)	Solomon Olds	3:09
2.	"Night Like This" (Sundown Time)	David Crowder; Solomon Olds	3:09
3.	"Night Like This" (Country Fried Mix)	Solomon Olds	3:28
Total length:			9:46

== Personnel ==
Adapted from Tidal, and AllMusic.

- Crowder — mixing (track 2), primary artist (tracks 1–3), producer (track 2), remixing (tracks 1 & 3)
- Joe LaPorta — mastering (tracks 1–3)
- Jacob "Biz" Morris — mixing (tracks 1 & 3)
- Solomon Olds — producer (tracks 1–3)
- Zach Paradis — remixing (track 3)

== Charts ==
Weekly chart performance for "Nights Like This"
Chart (2020)	Peak position
US Christian Songs (Billboard)	47

== Release history ==
Release dates and formats for "Wildfire"
Region	Date	Format	Label	Ref.
Various	May 15, 2020	Digital download; streaming	Sparrow; Capitol CMG	
