= Good God Almighty (Crowder song) =

2021 single by Crowder

Single by Crowder

from the album Milk & Honey
- Released: January 15, 2021
- Genre: Worship; rock; Southern gospel
- Length: 3:11; 3:15 (radio version)
- Label: Sparrow; Capitol CMG
- Songwriter(s): David Crowder; Jeff Sojka; Ben Glover
- Producer(s): Jeff Sojka; Ben Glover

Crowder singles chronology
"Night Like This" (2020)	"Good God Almighty" (2021)	"In the House" (2021)

Music video
- "Good God Almighty" on YouTube

"Good God Almighty" is a song performed by American contemporary Christian music singer Crowder, released on January 15, 2021, as the lead single to his fourth studio album, Milk & Honey (2021). Crowder co-wrote the song with Jeff Sojka and Ben Glover.

"Good God Almighty" peaked at No. 1 on the US Hot Christian Songs chart. The song also went on to peak at No. 17 on the Bubbling Under Hot 100 chart. "Good God Almighty" received a nomination for the GMA Dove Award Pop/Contemporary Recorded Song of the Year at the 2021 GMA Dove Awards. At the 2022 GMA Dove Awards, the song also received a GMA Dove Award nomination for Song of the Year.

== Background ==
On January 15, 2021, Crowder released "Good God Almighty" as his first single, indicating that he had been making music for the New Year. Crowder shared the story behind the song on social media, saying:

This song is just some good old fashioned group singing! And what I love about that is it is a group of people in harmony together. That's what we need and what I'm praying for, some harmony and togetherness.

== Composition ==
"Good God Almighty" is composed in the key of D with a tempo of 81 beats per minute and a musical time signature of 4/4.

== Reception ==
=== Critical response ===
Joshua Andre of 365 Days of Inspiring Media gave a positive review of "Good God Almighty", describing the song as "a 3 minute fusion between worship, rock and southern gospel- a marriage of genres that wouldn't normally work. But this is Crowder– and he's never been one to shy away from music experimentation. The result is a track that is forever etched into our memories… for the right reasons."

=== Accolades ===
Awards
Year	Organization	Award	Result	Ref
2021	GMA Dove Awards	Pop/Contemporary Recorded Song of the Year	Nominated	
2022	GMA Dove Awards	Song of the Year	Nominated	

== Commercial performance ==
"Good God Almighty" debuted on Christian Airplay chart dated January 23, 2021, at number 29. "Good God Almighty" debuted at number 14 on the US Hot Christian Songs chart dated January 30, 2021, concurrently charting at number one on the Christian Digital Song Sales chart. The song reached No. 1 on the Hot Christian Songs chart dated April 24, 2021, following a surge in streams and downloads after the music video's release. "Good God Almighty" is Crowder's first chart-topping hit on the Hot Christian Songs chart. The song also reached No. 1 on the Christian Airplay chart dated May 15, 2021, becoming Crowder's third Christian Airplay chart-topper.

== Music videos ==
Crowder released audio videos for the original and radio versions of "Good God Almighty" showcasing the single artwork on January 15, 2021. On April 10, 2021, Crowder released the official music video for "Good God Almighty".

== Track listing ==
"Good God Almighty"
No.	Title	Length
1.	"Good God Almighty"	3:11
2.	"Good God Almighty" (radio version)	3:15
Total length:		6:26

== Personnel ==
Adapted from AllMusic.

- Adam Ayan – mastering engineer
- Dave Clauss – mixing
- Crowder – vocals
- Ben Glover – producer
- Jeff Sojka – producer

== Charts ==
=== Weekly charts ===
Weekly chart performance for "Good God Almighty"
Chart (2021)	Peak position
US Bubbling Under Hot 100 Singles (Billboard)	17
US Christian Songs (Billboard)	1
US Christian Airplay (Billboard)	1
US Christian AC (Billboard)	1

=== Year-end charts ===
Year-end chart performance for "Good God Almighty"
Chart (2021)	Position
US Christian Songs (Billboard)	3
US Christian Airplay (Billboard)	1
US Christian AC (Billboard)	1
US Weekend 22	3

== Certifications ==
Region	Certification	Certified units/sales
United States (RIAA)	Gold	500,000^{‡}
^{‡} Sales+streaming figures based on certification alone.

== Release history ==
Release dates and formats for "Good God Almighty"
Region	Date	Format	Label	Ref.
Various	January 15, 2021	Digital download; streaming	Sparrow; Capitol CMG	
