= Neon Steeple =

Studio album by Crowder
- Released: May 27, 2014
- Genres: CCM; EDM; folktronica; contemporary worship music
- Length: 51:58
- Label: Sparrow/sixsteps (Capitol CMG)
- Producers: Ed Cash; David Crowder; Jared Fox; Will Hunt; Solomon Olds; Christian Paschall; Gabe Scott; Christopher Stevens

Crowder chronology
iTunes Session (2012)	Neon Steeple (2014)	Neon Porch Extravaganza (2015)

Singles from Neon Steeple
- 1. "I Am" Released: November 25, 2013; 2. "Come as You Are" Released: August 26, 2014; 3. "Lift Your Head Weary Sinner (Chains)" Released: July 14, 2015

Neon Steeple is the debut studio album from the mononymously known Christian musician Crowder. It was released on May 27, 2014 by Sparrow Records and sixstepsrecords, and the producers were Ed Cash, David Crowder, Jared Fox, Will Hunt, Solomon Olds, Christian Paschall, Gabe Scott and Christopher Stevens. The album sold 22,000 copies in its opening week of sales, causing it to debut at No. 9 on the Billboard 200.

== Background ==
After a long stint at the helm of David Crowder Band, Crowder and his band mates disbanded. Neon Steeple is his first solo musical foray and was released on May 27, 2014 by Sparrow Records and sixstepsrecords. The album was produced by the following producers; Ed Cash, David Crowder, Jared Fox, Will Hunt, Solomon Olds, Christian Paschall, Gabe Scott and Christopher Stevens.

== Artwork ==
The artwork for the physical copy of the album uses a kinegram to animate the text on the album's cover and liner notes.

== Critical reception ==
Professional ratings
Review scores
Source	Rating
365 Days of Inspiring Media	4/5 stars
AllMusic	3/5 stars
Christian Music Review	5/5 stars
Christianity Today	3/5 stars
CM Addict	5/5 stars
The Front Row Report	8.5/10 stars
HM Magazine	4/5 stars
Jesus Freak Hideout	5/5 stars 4.5/5 stars 4/5 stars
New Release Tuesday	4.5/5 stars
Worship Leader	5/5 stars

Neon Steeple met with a positive reception from music critics. Andrea Hunter of Worship Leader rated the album a perfect five stars, indicating saying Crowder "never settles into predictability" and displays "the edge of emotion in glistening pop". She called the material "raw, yet prodigiously conceived and crafted perfection." At New Release Tuesday, Caitlin Elizabeth Lassiter rated the album four-and-a-half stars, stating "the folk elements and the computer side came together brilliantly". Nathaniel Key of HM Magazine rated the album four stars out of five, calling it "a fresh, relevant and innovative debut release". At AllMusic, Thom Jurek rated the album three stars out of five, noting the music and the musician for its "quirkiness [...] quotient". John Brandon of Christianity Today rated the album three stars out of five, remarking that not everything works well on the album, yet states "'Neon Steeple' is a throwback and a step forward at the same time", which is why "Crowder's ready to lead us there" into a new era of "Christian worship".

Piet Levy of Milwaukee Journal Sentinel gave Neon Steeple a positive review, comparing the music to Avicii's "Wake Me Up" saying "Crowder sticks to folktronica, which blends the warm-hearted, rustic feel of folk with a little cinematic, synthesizer atmosphere." In addition, Levy said "If these songs were less explicitly religious, they'd likely do well on mainstream radio." Jesus Freak Hideout gave three reviews of the album, which were done by Ryan Barbee, Scott Fryberger and Mark Rice. Respectively, their ratings were five stars, four-and-a-half stars and four stars out of five. Barbee stated Crowder is back and "better than ever." Fryberger wrote that "Crowder is no stranger to experimentation, and he pulls it off amazingly with Neon Steeple." Rice said that "Neon Steeple brings forth some of the most creative Crowder concepts yet and excecutes [sic] it to a T". He called the release "everything we could have hoped from Crowder's first endeavor apart from his former band." Christian Music Review's April Covington rated Neon Steeple a perfect five stars, writing that she was "amazed" by Crowder's "crazy, awesome style" of music.

At CM Addict, Andrew Funderburk rated the album a perfect five stars, saying the release "shines brightly" and that "every bit of this project is designed with beautiful artistry and fine detail." Jonathan Andre of 365 Days of Inspiring Media rated the album four out of five, remarking say it features "some of the best songs of [Crowder's] whole entire career so far!" The Front Row Report's Reggie Edwards rated the album eight-and-a-half out of ten, stating that Neon Steeple "should be an instant hit with fans and it won't be long until worship teams everywhere are using some of the songs for their own services." Andrew Greenhalgh at The Sound Opinion gave a positive review of the album, saying "The fusion of the old and the new comes across as effortless in the artist's hands", and that Crowder "reasserts himself as a musical tour de force, making music that is as artistically successful as it is lyrically." At BREATHEcast, Kristen Solis gave a positive review of the album, saying "Only a musical and worship filled creative mind such as David Crowder could pull such an album like this and make it work." Ryan Brymer of Faith Village gave a positive review of the album, saying "This is a good record, but I would just encourage you to leave your expectations at the door."

== Awards and accolades ==
This album was No. 4 on the Worship Leader's Top 20 Albums of 2014 list.

The song, "I Am", was No. 8 on the Worship Leader's Top 20 Songs of 2014 list.

== Commercial performance ==
For the Billboard charting week of June 14, 2014, Neon Steeple debuted at No. 9 on the Billboard 200, and it sold 22,000 copies. It debuted at No. 1 on the Christian Albums chart.

== Track listing ==
Standard edition
No.	Title	Writer(s)	Length
1.	"Neon Intro"	David Crowder	0:35
2.	"My Beloved"	Crowder, Ed Cash, Seth Philpott	4:25
3.	"I Am"	Crowder, Cash	4:07
4.	"Come Alive"	Crowder, Hank Bentley, Gareth Gilkenson, Chris Llewellyn	3:15
5.	"Lift Your Head Weary Sinner (Chains)"	Crowder, Cash, Philpott	3:45
6.	"Come as You Are"	Crowder, Ben Glover, Matt Maher	4:50
7.	"Hands of Love"	Crowder, Philpott	5:09
8.	"Jesus Is Calling"	Charlie Monroe, Hank Williams	2:05
9.	"My Sweet Lord" (featuring Emmylou Harris)	Seth James, Steve Littleton	4:03
10.	"This I Know"	Crowder, Philpott	4:05
11.	"Ain't No Grave"	Crowder, Bentley, Philpott	3:42
12.	"You Are"	Crowder, Bentley, Cash	3:32
13.	"Here's My Heart"	Louie Giglio, Jason Ingram, Chris Tomlin	6:58
14.	"Steeple Outro"	Crowder, Bentley	1:27
Total length:			51:58

Deluxe edition
No.	Title	Writer(s)	Length
15.	"All This Glory"	Crowder, Solomon Olds, Christopher Stevens	4:51
16.	"Because He Lives" ([Remix] featuring Bill Gaither)	Bill Gaither, Gloria Gaither	5:17
17.	"How He Loves" (Live from Passion)	John Mark McMillan	5:26
Total length:			67:32

== Personnel ==
- David Crowder – vocals (1–14), acoustic guitar (2, 5, 7, 11, 16, 17), programming (3, 4, 7), instruments (3, 4, 7), lead vocals (15–17), lead guitar (15)
- Gabe Scott – programming (2, 3), instruments (3, 6, 9, 13), additional programming (7), additional instruments (7), backing vocals (13, 15), dobro (15, 16)
- Ed Cash – programming (3, 5), instruments (3, 12), guitars (5), banjo (5)
- Will Hunt – programming (4), instruments (4)
- Solomon Olds – programming (4, 7), instruments (4, 7)
- Ben Glover – additional programming (6)
- Chad Copelin – keyboards (8)
- Cara Fox – keyboards (8), cello (8, 13), backing vocals (8)
- Jared Fox – additional keyboards (8), acoustic guitar (8)
- Christopher Stevens – keyboards (10), programming (10)
- Matt Gilder – acoustic piano (13)
- Hank Bentley – guitars (1, 14), harmonium (2, 11), acoustic guitar type instruments (2), acoustic guitar (8, 11), electric guitar (8, 11, 13), Rhodes electric piano (11), bouzouki (11), auxiliary acoustic instruments (17)
- Kenny Hutson – auxiliary acoustic instruments (2, 15, 17), lap steel guitar (5, 11), banjo (5), mandolin (11, 16)
- Ron Block – banjo (2, 7)
- Taylor Johnson – guitars (4), resonator guitar (4)
- Josh Murty – acoustic guitar (5), electric guitar (5), resonator guitar (5), mandolin (5), theremin (5)
- Phil Madeira – electric guitar (8), slide guitar (8), Hammond B3 organ (9, 11), lap steel guitar (11)
- David Ramsey – acoustic guitar (10)
- Bryan Brown – electric guitar (13)
- Daniel Carson – electric guitar (13)
- J.R. Collins – bass (2, 11, 15, 17), upright bass (16)
- Max Mitchell – synth bass (5)
- Matthew Melton – bass (8)
- Christian Paschall – drums (2, 5, 11, 15, 17), Mellotron (5), programming (5, 11), guitars (5), percussion (5, 11)
- Jacob Schrodt – drums (8), percussion (8)
- Todd Bragg – percussion (2, 15–17), drums (16)
- Claire Indie Nunn – cello (2, 11, 15–17)
- Laura Musten Sink – violin (2, 15–17)
- Chris Carmichael – fiddle (10)
- Liz Huett – backing vocals (2, 7, 15)
- Sally George – backing vocals (4)
- A "Plethora of good folk" – backing vocals (5)
- Blaine Watson – backing vocals (7)
- David Spencer – backing vocals (8)
- Emmylou Harris – vocals (9)
- Mercy Stevens – backing vocals (10)
- Bill Gaither – vocals (16)

Gang vocals and handclaps on "This I Know"

- Lauren Johnson, Timmon Johnson, Tom LoSchiavo and Mercy Stevens

== Production ==
- Louie Giglio – executive producer
- Shelley Giglio – executive producer, art direction
- Brad O'Donnell – executive producer
- David Crowder – producer (1–5, 7, 11, 14–17), engineer (3–5, 7)
- Solomon Olds – producer (2, 4, 7, 15), engineer (4, 7), remixing (16)
- Gabe Scott – producer (2, 3, 6, 9, 13), engineer (3, 6, 9, 13), vocal engineer (15)
- Christopher Stevens – producer (2, 10, 15), mixing (10)
- Ed Cash – producer (3, 5, 12), engineer (3, 5, 12)
- Will Hunt – producer (4), engineer (4)
- Christian Paschall – producer (5, 11), engineer (5, 11), mixing (5)
- Jared Fox – producer (8), engineer (8)
- Tommy Carnes – electric and slide guitar engineer (8), B3 organ engineer (9, 11), lap steel guitar engineer (11)
- Todd Robbins – Emmylou Harris vocal engineer (9)
- Tom Tapley – engineer (11)
- Shane D. Wilson – mixing (1, 7, 9, 13–15)
- Jon Kaplan – mixing (2, 4, 6, 11, 17)
- Neal Avron – mixing (3)
- Mark Endert – mixing (12)
- Kenny Hutson – additional engineer (4)
- Zakk Cervini – editing (4, 6, 11), mix assistant (6, 11)
- Justin Dowse – mix assistant (7, 9, 13, 14)
- Evan Redwine – mix assistant (7, 9, 13, 14)
- Jess Chambers – A&R administration
- Leighton Ching – art direction, design
- Mike McCloskey – art direction
- Becca Wildsmith – art direction
- Zack Arias – photography
- Mary Caroline Mann – photography

== Chart performance ==
Chart (2014)	Peak position
US Billboard 200	9
US Top Christian Albums (Billboard)	1

== Certifications ==
Region	Certification	Certified units/sales
United States (RIAA)	Gold	500,000^{‡}
^{‡} Sales+streaming figures based on certification alone.
