= A Night Like This (2025 film) =

2025 British film by Liam Calvert

- Theatrical release poster
- Directed by: Liam Calvert
- Written by: Diego Scerrati
- Produced by: Diego Scerrati
- Starring: Alexander Lincoln; Jack Brett Anderson; David Bradley; Jimmy Ericson; Beth Rylance; Kane Surry; Éloïse Rouse; Sam Jochim; Rizwan Khan; Harriet Olivia-Wilson
- Distributed by: Verve Pictures
- Release dates: 28 March 2025 (BFI Flare); 26 September 2025 (United Kingdom)
- Running time: 101 minutes
- Country: United Kingdom
- Language: English
- Box office: $8,959

A Night Like This is a 2025 British romantic drama film directed by Liam Calvert and written by Diego Scerrati, starring Alexander Lincoln as Oliver and Jack Brett Anderson as Lukas, with supporting performances by David Bradley, Jimmy Ericson, Beth Rylance and Kane Surry. The film grossed $8,959 worldwide.

== Plot summary ==
On a late December night in London, Lukas contemplates jumping off a bridge. He instead goes to a pub where a man named Oliver steals his drink. After they meet again on a bus, Oliver asks Lukas to keep spending the night with him. Oliver admits that he doesn't want to be alone as his father recently died, and recognizes Lukas has also been suffering.

The two go to another pub where they discuss their lives. Lukas is a gay German immigrant who has been staying in London for the past four years. He is an aspiring actor but has little to show for it. He started work at a café that day, but claims that he just had an audition that went well and believes he will get the part. Oliver is a hyperactive and occasionally volatile man who comes from a wealthy family in London. A musician and club owner, Oliver is £2.3 million in debt and is struggling because his inheritance went to his father's most recent wife. He is also devastated by the fact that he wasn't able to prove to his father that he wasn't a failure before his death. Lukas believes that this brief encounter will allow both of them to be completely themselves since they know they will not have a relationship the morning after, when Lukas begins his shift at the café. Oliver agrees, but is determined that each of them will find meaning in their lives by the end.

Oliver pushes Lukas to stand up for himself, while Lukas helps Oliver overcome his lack of confidence in his musical talent. Lukas talks about his last significant relationship with a man, who broke up with him because Lukas wanted to be in a serious relationship. Since then, Lukas has refused to have boyfriends and resigned himself to brief sexual encounters. Lukas and Oliver attend a silent disco where they become intimate and kiss on the dance floor. Despite only being with women before, Oliver wants to have a relationship with Lukas. Lukas explains that he doesn't romanticize life and love anymore, and that they are only being this open with each other because they plan on never seeing each other again. Throughout the night, Lukas has flashes of a violent sexual encounter and messages from a producer named Dean.

After Lukas witnesses Oliver argue with a woman who is revealed to be his father's widow, Oliver explains to Lukas that his financial troubles led him to hire drug dealers to sell to minors in his club so that he could make a cut. Earlier that day, his father's widow offered Oliver money. He was enraged by this offer, causing her to withdraw it. Lukas admits that he lied about doing well at the audition, and that his first shift at the café went poorly. He then received a call from Dean, an agent from his last audition, that offered him an acting career in exchange for sex. Lukas reveals to Oliver that he attempted to jump off the bridge before they met. Oliver says that he also had suicidal thoughts, and agrees with Lukas that it is a bad idea for them to be in a relationship.

A 15-year-old runaway named Daniel they encountered earlier in the night is assaulted by a man for attempting to steal his wallet. Lukas punches the attacker and flees with Oliver and Daniel. Later, due to Oliver failing to defend Lukas from Daniel's homophobic remarks and the recent revelation of Oliver selling drugs to minors, Lukas leaves them. Daniel convinces Oliver to go after him. Oliver finds Lukas at the bridge where he attempted to jump off from before. The two have a heated argument about privilege and comparing trauma in each other's lives. After realizing they're both similar and have gone through the same kinds of pain, they both apologize and forgive each other.

As the morning approaches, Oliver walks Lukas to the café. Before departing, they share a tender kiss. Lukas, having changed his mind, asks if they could try to be together. Oliver still believes it to be a bad idea. Before leaving, Oliver tells Lukas that he's not alone and that he will find someone that will love him, but only if he lets himself be loved. Lukas goes to work where he texts Dean that he will not see him again. During his shift, Oliver returns to Lukas and reveals he had a realization that human life is a miracle despite how brief it is; and rather than searching for meaning in life, they should accept that life has given them meaning.

== Cast ==
- Alexander Lincoln as Oliver
- Jack Brett Anderson as Lukas
- David Bradley as John
- Jimmy Ericson as Daniel
- Beth Rylance as Emma
- Kane Surry as Henry
- Sam Jochim as Bartender
- Rizwan Khan as Drunk man
- Harriet Olivia-Wilson as Nurse

== Background and release ==
The film premiered at BFI Flare: London LGBTIQ+ Film Festival on 28 March 2025. Promotion included the release of the first official trailer highlighting the lead pairing of Alexander Lincoln and Jack Brett Anderson.

== Reception ==
Critical reception was mixed. The Guardian praised the concept of a nocturnal encounter but found the execution flat. Attitude noted the chemistry between the leads and its focus on queer connection. Instinct Magazine described the film as “a refreshing take on queer connection.” Stage and Cinema offered commentary on the performances and the film's nocturnal pacing.

=== Accolades ===
- Winner – FilmOut Festival Award, Best International Feature (FilmOut San Diego, 2025).
- Winner – All the Lovers Award, Best Feature Film (Lovers Film Festival, 2025).
