= I Am (Crowder song) =

Single by Crowder

from the album Neon Steeple
- Released: November 25, 2013
- Genre: CCM; Christian alternative; modern worship; folk; Americana; electropop; folktronica
- Length: 4:05 (album version); 3:30 (radio edit)
- Label: sixsteps/Sparrow
- Songwriters: Ed Cash; David Crowder
- Producers: Cash; Crowder

Crowder singles chronology
"I Am" (2013)	"Come As You Are" (2014)

"I Am" is the debut solo single by folktronica musician Crowder from his debut album, Neon Steeple. It was released on November 25, 2013, by sixstepsrecords and Sparrow Records, with the song being written and produced alongside Ed Cash.

== Background ==
The single was co-written by Crowder and Ed Cash. The song was recorded just after Cash had worked with a choir group of orphans from Uganda, and this experience inspired the lyrics in the first verse of the song.

== Release ==
"I Am" was digitally released as the lead single from Neon Steeple on November 25, 2013, by sixstepsrecords and Sparrow Records.

== Weekly charts ==
Charts (2013–2014)	Peak position
Billboard Christian Songs	3
Billboard Christian AC	6
Billboard Christian AC Indicator	5
Billboard Christian Hot AC/CHR	2
