= Cochren & Co. =

American contemporary Christian band

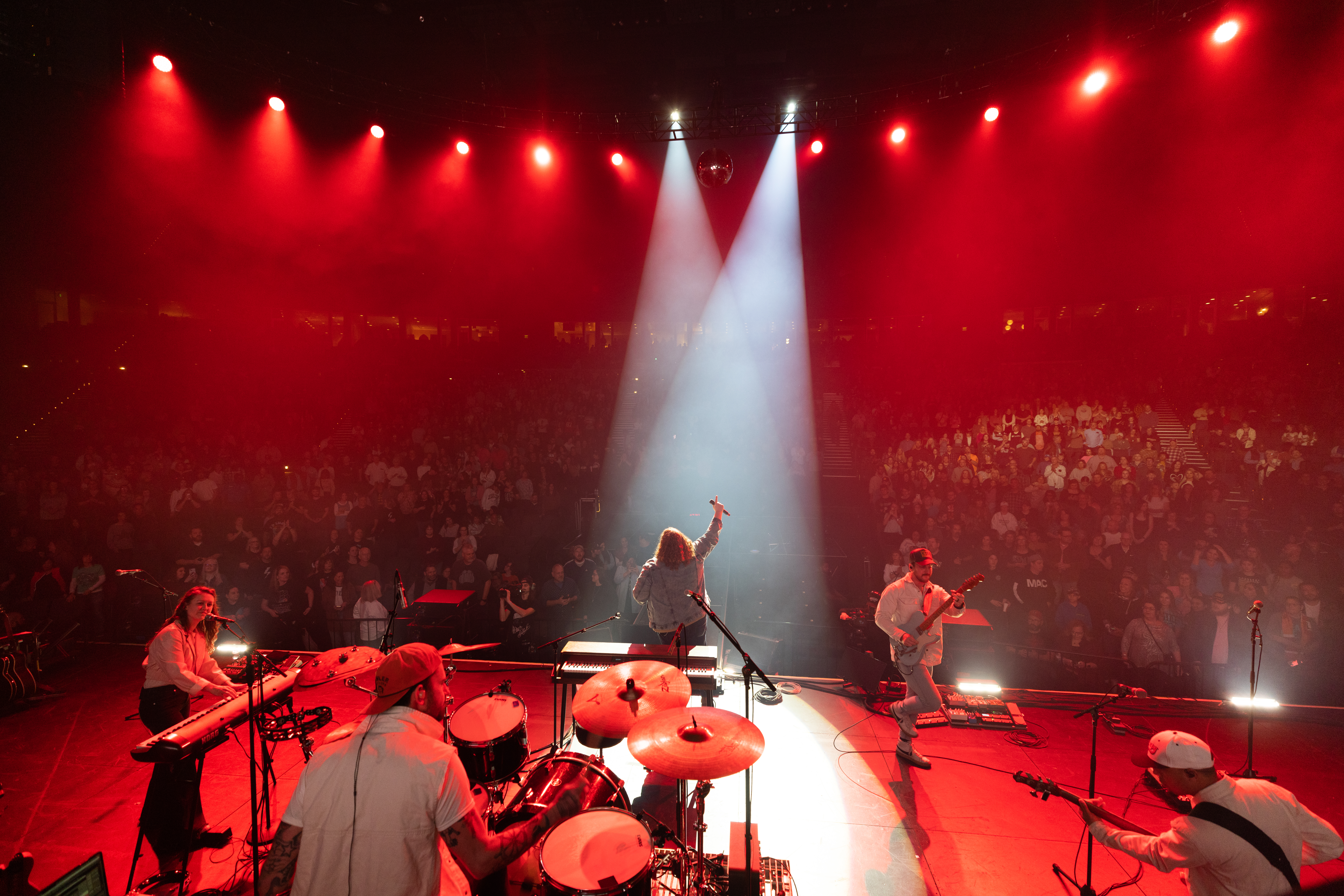
- Cochren & Co. performing live in 2023

Background information
- Origin: Indiana, United States
- Genres: Contemporary Christian music; heartland rock; soft rock
- Years active: 2010–present
- Label: Gotee Records
- Members: Michael Cochren
- Website: cochrenmusic.com

Cochren & Co. is a contemporary Christian band led by singer-songwriter Michael Cochren and signed to Gotee Records.

== Origin ==
Michael Cochren grew up in Pike County, Indiana, where music was a major part of his upbringing. After graduating school, Michael Cochren started a band with friends, later including his wife Leah Cochren, and began touring under the name Cochren & Co.

== Career ==
Cochren & Co. signed with TobyMac's Gotee Records and released their first single for the label in 2018. The song "Church (Take Me Back)" reached the Top 10 on Billboard's Christian Airplay chart.

Cochren & Co. were nominated for Break Out Single of the Year at the 2019 K-Love Fan Awards.

In 2020, Cochren & Co. released their second single "One Day", which became their second Top 10 Billboard radio hit. Later that year the group was nominated for New Artist of the Year at the 51st Annual GMA Dove Awards.

The group released their debut full-length album "Don't Lose Hope" in January 2021. The album garnered critical and commercial success including three Top 10 Billboard radio hits, and the title track "Don't Lose Hope" was featured in an episode of CBS's MacGyver

In February 2023 Cochren & Co. released their second album. The title track "Running Home" spent 4 weeks at No. 1 on the Billboard Christian Airplay chart. The project also featured the Top 15 Billboard Airplay & AC radio single "Thank God For Sunday Morning", which was listed on K-LOVE's 22 Songs That Defined 2022. A live performance of the song "Be There For You" from the group's sophomore release was featured on GRAMMY.com's Positive Vibes Only.

Cochren & Co. made their historic debut at the Grand Ole Opry on June 13, 2023.

In August 2023, Cochren & Co. released the song "Parking Lot," which is still climbing the charts as of February 2024.

== Members ==
Current

- Michael Cochren

== Discography ==
=== Albums ===
==== Studio albums ====
Title	Details
Don't Lose Hope	Released: January 22, 2021; Label: Gotee Records; Formats: CD, DL, LP, digital download, streaming
Running Home	Released: February 3, 2023; Label: Gotee; Formats: CD, DL, digital download, streaming
Runs in the Blood	Released: May 29, 2026; Label: Gotee; Formats: CD, DL, digital download, streaming
"—" denotes a recording that did not chart or was not released in that territory.

==== Holiday albums ====
Title	Details
The Company Christmas Album	Released: October 11, 2024; Label: Gotee; Formats: Digital download, streaming
"—" denotes a recording that did not chart or was not released in that territory.

=== Singles ===
Title	Year	Peak chart positions		Certifications	Album
Title	Year	US Christ	US Christ Airplay	Certifications	Album
"I Got You"	2019	—	—		Don't Lose Hope
"Church (Take Me Back)"	2019	9	9	RIAA: Gold	Don't Lose Hope
"Edge of My Seat" (with TobyMac)	2019	9	4		Beat of My Heart EP
"One Day"	2019	11	7	RIAA: Gold	Don't Lose Hope
"Heart and Soul"	2019	—	—		Non-album single
"Christmas With You"	2019	—	—		The Company Christmas Album
"Please Come Home for Christmas"	2019	—	—		The Company Christmas Album
"Who Can"	2020	17	13		Don't Lose Hope
"Christmas (What the World Needs)"	2021	—	—		The Company Christmas Album
"This Christmas"	2022	—	—		Non-album single
"Parking Lot"	2023	30	—		Running Home
"(There's No Place Like) Home For the Holidays"	2023	—	—		The Company Christmas Album
"His Mercy is More"	2024	—	—		Non-album singles
"Walk With Jesus"	2024	—	—		Non-album singles
"As For Me and My House"	2024	—	—		Non-album singles
"Money Can't Buy"	2024	12	2		Non-album singles
"Christus Victor (Amen)"	2024	—	—		Non-album singles
"What Grace Can Do"	2026	16	8		Non-album singles
"—" denotes a recording that did not chart or was not released in that territory.

=== Other charted songs ===
Title	Year	Peak chart positions		Certifications	Album
Title	Year	US Christ	US Christ Airplay	Certifications	Album
"Grave"	2021	—	34		Don't Lose Hope
"Thank God for Sunday Morning"	2022	16	14		Running Home
"Running Home"	2023	10	1		Running Home
"That Spirit of Christmas"	2024	—	7		The Company Christmas Album
"—" denotes a recording that did not chart or was not released in that territory.

=== Music videos ===
Title	Year	Album	Type	Source
"Church (Take Me Back)"	2019	Don't Lose Hope	Lyrics	Youtube
"Grave"	2019	Don't Lose Hope	Performance	Youtube
"I Got You"	2019	Don't Lose Hope	Performance	Youtube
"One Day"	2019	Don't Lose Hope	Lyrics	Youtube
"Christmas With You"	2019	The Company Christmas Album	Lyrics	Youtube
"Who Can"	2020	Don't Lose Hope	Lyrics	Youtube
"Don't Lose Hope"	2020	Don't Lose Hope	Performance	Youtube
"For My Good"	2021	Don't Lose Hope	Performance	Youtube
"Waiting for This Moment"	2021	Don't Lose Hope	Performance	Youtube
"Good Memories"	2021	Running Home	Narrative	Youtube
"Grave"	2021	Don't Lose Hope	Live performance	Youtube
"Christmas (What the World Needs)"	2021	The Company Christmas Album	Lyrics	Youtube
"Thank God for Sunday Morning"	2022	Running Home	Lyrics	Youtube
"The Lows"	2022	Running Home	Performance	Youtube
"This Christmas"	2022	The Company Christmas Album	Animated narrative	Youtube
"Running Home"	2023	Running Home	Lyrics	Youtube
"Parking Lot"	2023	Running Home	Lyrics	Youtube
"Parking Lot"	2023	Running Home	Live performance	Youtube
"There's No Place Like (Home for the Holidays)"	2023	The Company Christmas Album	Lyrics	Youtube
"Money Can't Buy	2024	non-album single	Lyrics	Youtube
"—" denotes a recording that did not chart or was not released in that territory.

== Awards and nominations ==
=== GMA Dove Awards ===
Year	Nominee / work	Award	Result	ref
2020	Cochren & Co.	New Artist of the Year	Nominated	
2023	Cochren & Co. – "The Lows"	Rock/Contemporary Recorded Song of the Year	Nominated	

=== K-LOVE Fan Awards ===
Year	Nominee / work	Award	Result	ref
2019	"Church (Take Me Back)"	Break Out Single of the Year	Nominated	
