= Brandon Lake discography =

- Studio albums: 5
- EPs: 3
- Live albums: 2
- Singles: 44

American Christian musician Brandon Lake has released five studio albums, two live albums, three extended plays, and 44 singles (including five promotional singles).

== Studio albums ==
List of studio albums, with selected chart positions
Title	Details	Peak chart positions				
Title	Details	US	US Rock	US Christ.	UK C&G	UK Down
Closer	Released: May 20, 2016; Label: Independent; Format: Digital download, streaming, CD	—	—	—	—	—
House of Miracles	Released: August 28, 2020; Label: Bethel Music; Format: Digital download, streaming, CD	—	—	6	—	—
Help!	Released: May 13, 2022; Label: Tribl Records; Format: Digital download, streaming, CD	—	—	18	—	—
Coat of Many Colors	Released: October 20, 2023; Label: Provident Label Group, Essential Records; Format: Digital download, streaming, CD	135	—	1	9	74
King of Hearts	Released: June 13, 2025; Label: Provident, Sony Music; Format: Digital download, streaming, CD, LP	7	1	1	1	30
"—" denotes a recording that did not chart

== Live albums ==
List of live albums, with selected chart positions
Title	Album details	Peak chart positions	
Title	Album details	US Christ.	UK C&G
House of Miracles (Live)	Released: January 22, 2021; Label: Bethel; Format: Digital download, streaming, CD	29	—
Tear Off the Roof (Live from the Holy City)	Released: June 21, 2024; Label: Provident; Format: Digital download, streaming	18	18
King of Hearts - In the Room!	Released: June 26, 2026; Label: Provident; Format: Digital download, streaming	10	—
"—" denotes a recording that did not chart

== Remix albums ==
List of remix albums, with selected chart positions
Title	Details	Peak chart positions
Title	Details	US Christ.
Amazon Music Songline	Released: October 24, 2025; Label: Provident; Format: Digital download	14

== EPs ==
List of extended plays
Title	EP details
Almond Eyes	Released: February 5, 2021; Label: Bethel; Format: Digital download, streaming
Song Sessions (with Essential Worship)	Released: August 26, 2022; Label: Provident; Format: Digital download, streaming
Apple Music Nashville Sessions	Released: March 26, 2024; Label: Provident; Format: Digital download, streaming

== Singles ==
=== As lead artist ===
List of singles and peak chart positions
Title	Year	Chart positions										Certifications	Album
Title	Year	US	US Country	US Country Airplay	US Country Digital	US Christ.	US Christ. Airplay	US Christ. Digital	CAN Country	NZ Hot	WW	Certifications	Album
"Run to You"	2016	—	—	—	—	—	—	—	—	—	—		Closer
"Pour Me Out"	2018	—	—	—	—	—	—	—	—	—	—		Non-album singles
"This Is a Move"	2019	—	—	—	—	36	—	10	—	—	—		Non-album singles
"We Praise You" (with Bethel Music)	2020	—	—	—	—	—	46	—	—	—	—		Revival's in the Air
"I Need a Ghost"	2020	—	—	—	—	—	27	5	—	—	—		House of Miracles
"Just Like Heaven"	2020	—	—	—	—	36	—	—	—	—	—		House of Miracles
"Too Good to Not Believe" (with Bethel Music)	2021	—	—	—	—	17	14	7	—	—	—		Homecoming
"Too Good to Not Believe" (with Cody Carnes)	2021	—	—	—	—	45	40	—	—	—	—		Non-album single
"I See You" (with Chris Tomlin)	2021	—	—	—	—	31	50	10	—	—	—		Always
"Honey in the Rock" (with Brooke Ligertwood)	2022	—	—	—	—	7	9	3	—	—	—	RIAA: Gold	Seven
"Help!"	2022	—	—	—	—	—	—	—	—	—	—		Help!
"Gratitude"	2022	— (Note: "Gratitude" did not enter the Billboard Hot 100, but peaked at No. 1 on the Billboard Digital Song Sales chart.)	—	—	—	1	1	1	—	—	—	RIAA: Gold; RMNZ: Gold	House of Miracles
"Graves" (with KB)	2022	—	—	—	—	33	—	24	—	—	—		His Glory Alone II
"Plead the Blood" (with Chris Davenport and Cody Carnes)	2023	—	—	—	—	—	46	—	—	—	—		Time
"Talking to Jesus" (with Thomas Rhett)	2023	—	—	—	—	26	—	8	—	—	—		Non-album single
"Praise You Anywhere"	2023	— (Note: "Praise You Anywhere" did not enter the Billboard Hot 100, but peaked at No. 38 on the Billboard Digital Song Sales chart.)	—	—	—	1	2	2	—	—	—	RIAA: Gold	Coat of Many Colors
"People of Heaven" (with Phil Wickham)	2023	—	—	—	—	40	—	8	—	—	—		Non-album single
"Count 'Em"	2023	—	—	—	—	19	18	6	—	—	—	RIAA: Gold	Coat of Many Colors
"Miracle Child"	2024	—	—	—	—	20	15	—	—	—	—		Coat of Many Colors
"Love of God" (with Wickham)	2024	—	—	—	—	20	—	2	—	—	—		Non-album single
"That's Who I Praise"	2024	— (Note: "That's Who I Praise" did not enter the Billboard Hot 100, but peaked at number 12 on the Bubbling Under Hot 100 chart.)	—	—	—	1	1	1	—	39	—	RIAA: Gold	King of Hearts
"Hard Fought Hallelujah" (original or with Jelly Roll)	2024	40	12	24	1	1	1	1	60	18	197	RIAA: Platinum (original); RIAA: Platinum (remix)	King of Hearts
"I Know a Name" (with Elevation Worship and Chris Brown)	2025	—	—	—	—	5	2	3	—	—	—	RIAA: Gold	King of Hearts
"Sevens"	2025	—	—	—	—	15	—	7	—	—	—		King of Hearts
"When a Cowboy Prays" (original or with Cody Johnson)	2025	— (Note: "When a Cowboy Prays" did not enter the Billboard Hot 100, but peaked at No. 6 on the Bubbling Under Hot 100 chart.)	43	41	2	4	—	1	—	—	—		Non-album singles
"No Idols" (featuring Skema Boy)	2025	— (Note: "No Idols" did not enter the Billboard Hot 100, but peaked at No. 19 on the Digital Song Sales chart.)	—	—	—	13	—	1	—	—	—		Non-album singles
"Just Believe" (with Bailey Zimmerman)	2026	— (Note: "Just Believe" did not enter the Billboard Hot 100, but peaked at No. 5 on the Digital Song Sales chart.)	50	—	3	10	—	1	—	29	—		Non-album singles
"The Jesus I Know Now" (with Lainey Wilson)	2026	— (Note: "The Jesus I Know Now" did not enter the Billboard Hot 100, but peaked at No. 21 on the Bubbling Under Hot 100 chart.)	42	—	2	8	—	1	—	31	—		Non-album singles
"The Author" (with Nick Jonas)	2026	— (Note: "The Author" did not enter the Billboard Hot 100, but peaked at No. 2 on the Digital Song Sales chart.)	—	—	—	8	17	1	—	35	—		Non-album singles
"How Good God Is"	2026	— (Note: "How Good God Is" did not enter the Billboard Hot 100, but peaked at number 9 on the Bubbling Under Hot 100 chart.)	—	—	—	3	2	—	—	—	—		Non-album singles
"Changing"	2026	—	—	—	—	—	—	—	—	—	—		Non-album singles
"Why Would I"	2026	—	—	—	—	—	—	—	—	—	—		Non-album singles
"—" denotes a recording that did not chart

=== As featured artist ===
List of singles as featured artist and peak chart positions
Title	Year	Chart positions						Certifications	Album
Title	Year	US Bubb.	US Christ	US Christ Air.	US Christ AC	US Christ Digital	US Christ Stream.	Certifications	Album
"How Beautiful" (Seacoast Worship featuring Brandon Lake)	2018	—	—	—	—	—	—		Non-album singles
"Found" (Seacoast Worship featuring Lake)	2018	—	—	—	—	—	—		Non-album singles
"Fall on Us" (Seacoast Worship featuring Lake)	2018	—	—	—	—	—	—		Non-album singles
"New Stories" (London Gatch featuring Lake)	2018	—	—	—	—	—	—		New Stories
"We Praise You" (Matt Redman featuring Lake)	2020	—	—	—	—	—	—		Let There Be Wonder
"We Are the Kingdom" (Seacoast Music featuring Lake)	2020	—	—	—	—	—	—		Non-album single
"Battle Is the Lord's" (Rebecca St. James featuring Lake)	2020	—	48	34	—	24	—		Dawn (EP)
"Graves into Gardens" (Elevation Worship featuring Lake)	2020	2	1	1	1	1	2	RIAA: 2× Platinum; RMNZ: Gold	Graves into Gardens
"Might Get Loud" (Elevation Worship featuring Chris Brown, Lake, and Tiffany Hudson)	2021	—	20	—	—	4	—		Lion
"Bless His Name (I've Got That Joy)" (Seacoast Music featuring Lake and Andy Cherry)	2021	—	—	—	—	—	—		Non-album singles
"Silent Night (Emmanuel)" (Seacoast Music featuring Lake)	2021	—	—	—	—	—	—		Non-album singles
"Fear Is Not My Future" (Maverick City Music and Kirk Franklin featuring Lake and Chandler Moore)	2022	—	13	11	11	—	—		Kingdom Book One
"Praise" (Elevation Worship featuring Lake, Chris Brown, and Moore)	2024	5	1	1	1	1	1	RIAA: 2× Platinum; RMNZ: Platinum	Can You Imagine?
"Hands Up to Heaven" (Seacoast featuring Lake)	2024	—	—	—	—	—	—		Courage
"Can't Steal My Joy" (Josiah Queen featuring Brandon Lake)	2025	—	6	1	1	4	16	RIAA: Gold	Mt. Zion
"So So Good" (Phil Wickham featuring Elevation Worship and Brandon Lake)	2025	—	8	31	—	4	15		Song of the Saints
"Hope" (remix; Nick Jonas featuring Brandon Lake)	2026	—	30	—	—	2	—		Non-album single
"—" denotes a recording that did not chart

== Promotional singles ==
=== As lead artist ===
List of promotional singles and peak chart positions
Title	Year	Chart positions				Album
Title	Year	US Rock	US Christ	US Christ Digital	US Christ Stream.	Album
"Come Out of that Grave (Resurrection Power)" (with Bethel Music)	2020	—	38	—	—	Revival's in the Air
"House of Miracles"	2020	—	—	—	—	House of Miracles
"House of Miracles"	2021	—	—	—	—	House of Miracles (Live)
"Coat of Many Colors"	2023	—	20	2	—	Coat of Many Colors
"Tear Off the Roof"	2023	—	27	2	—	Coat of Many Colors
"Nothing New (I Do)" (Wedding Version) (Note: "Nothing New (I Do)" (Wedding Version) was released as a standalone single. The original version of the song was released on Coat of Many Colors.)	2024	—	28	—	—	Non-album single
"Count 'Em" (Remix) (with KB)	2024	—	40	—	—	Count 'Em / Tear Off the Roof (Remixes) (single)
"Tear Off the Roof" (Remix) (with Sado)	2024	—	—	—	—	Count 'Em / Tear Off the Roof (Remixes) (single)
"I Know a Name" (solo version)	2025	—	13	—	—	King of Hearts
"Daddy's DNA"	2025	34	6	4	10	King of Hearts
"—" denotes a recording that did not chart.

=== As featured artist ===
Title	Year	Peak chart positions				Certifications	Album
Title	Year	US Christ.	US Christ Digital	US Christ Stream.	US Gospel	Certifications	Album
"Talking to Jesus" (Elevation Worship and Maverick City Music featuring Lake)	2021	9	1	7	1	RIAA: Gold	Old Church Basement
"The Name" (Maverick City Music and Kirk Franklin featuring Lake and Maryanne J. George)	2022	—	—	—	—		Kingdom Book One (Deluxe)
"—" denotes a recording that did not chart.

== Other charted songs ==
=== As lead artist ===
List of songs and peak chart positions
Title	Year	Peak positions					Album
Title	Year	US Rock	US Christ	US Christ Air.	US Christ Digital	US Christ Stream	Album
"Greater Still" (with Essential Worship)	2022	—	—	41	—	—	Songs Sessions (EP)
"Adoption Song"	2023	—	49	—	—	—	Coat of Many Colors
"Plans"	2025	—	27	—	—	—	King of Hearts
"King of Hearts"	2025	46	12	28	—	16	King of Hearts
"I Know a Name" (with CeCe Winans)	2025	—	—	—	2	—	King of Hearts
"As for Me & My Home"	2025	—	26	—	10	—	King of Hearts
"The Great I Am Can"	2025	—	31	—	—	—	King of Hearts
"Remember the Miracles" (with Hank Bentley)	2025	—	44	—	—	—	King of Hearts
"Right in the Middle" (with Hulvey)	2025	—	40	—	—	—	King of Hearts
"But God"	2025	—	24	—	—	—	King of Hearts
"Watch This!"	2025	—	48	—	—	—	King of Hearts
"Spare Change"	2025	—	16	—	—	23	King of Hearts
"1,000,000 Reasons Why"	2025	—	47	—	—	—	King of Hearts (Deluxe)
"—" denotes a recording that did not chart.

=== As featured artist ===
List of songs and peak chart positions
Title	Year	Peak positions			Certifications	Album
Title	Year	US Christ	Christ Air.	US Gospel	Certifications	Album
"When I Lock Eyes With You" (Maverick City Music and Upperroom featuring Brandon Lake and Elyssa Smith)	2020	—	—	— (Note: "When I Lock Eyes With You" did not enter the Hot Gospel Songs chart, but peaked at number 5 on the Gospel Digital Song Sales chart.)		You Hold It All Together (EP)
"Champion" (Maverick City Music and Upperroom featuring Lake and Maryanne J. George)	2020	48	—	20		You Hold It All Together (EP)
"Closer" (Maverick City Music featuring Lake)	2021	45	—	—		Maverick City, Vol. 3 Pt. 2
"Rest on Us" (Maverick City Music and Upperroom featuring Lake and Eniola Abioye)	2021	36	38	12	RIAA: Gold	Move Your Heart (EP)
"Come Again" (Elevation Worship and Maverick City Music featuring Lake and Chandler Moore)	2021	29	—	11		Old Church Basement
"Used to This" (Elevation Worship and Maverick City Music featuring Naomi Raine and Lake)	2021	27	—	10		Old Church Basement
"Where I'm Standing Now" (Phil Wickham featuring Lake)	2022	—	41	—		Hymn of Heaven
"Lion" (Elevation Worship featuring Chris Brown and Lake)	2022	16	39	—	RIAA: Platinum	Lion
"Water Is Wild" (Elevation Worship featuring Brown and Lake)	2022	44	—	—		Lion
"Son of David" (Ryan Ellis featuring Lake)	2022	18	37	—		Ryan Ellis
"Make a Way" (Elevation Worship featuring Moore and Lake)	2023	25	—	—		Can You Imagine?
"Runnin" (Elevation Worship featuring Lake)	2023	30	—	—		Can You Imagine?
"—" denotes a recording that did not chart.

== Other appearances ==
Title	Year	Album	Ref.
"Strength and Victory" (Seacoast Worship featuring Brandon Lake)	2018	Samson (Songs From And Inspired By The Motion Picture)	
"New Stories" (London Gatch featuring Lake)	2019	Home (EP)	
"Communion" (Maverick City Music featuring Steffany Gretzinger and Lake)	2019	Maverick City, Vol. 2 (EP)	
"Tumbas a Jardines (Graves into Gardens)" (Elevation Worship featuring Lake)	2020	Tumbas a Jardines	
"Fresh Fire" (Maverick City Music featuring Naomi Raine and Lake)	2020	Maverick City, Vol. 3 Pt. 2	
"You Call Me Friend" (Gatch featuring Lake)	2020	Remember: Live At Seacoast	
"New Stories" (Gatch featuring Lake)	2020	Remember: Live At Seacoast	
"Heart of Worship" (Seacoast Music featuring Lake)	2020	At Home (EP)	
"Better" (Tribl and Maverick City Music featuring Lake and Tianna Horsey)	2021	Tribl I	
"Graves into Gardens" (Bethel Music and Lake)	2021	Peace, Vol. II	
"Forever and Ever Amen" (Maverick City Music featuring Lake, Phil Wickham, and Mav City Gospel Choir)	2021	A Very Maverick Christmas	
"Silent Night / Jesus We Love You" (Maverick City Music featuring Lake, Wickham, Kim Walker-Smith, and Mav City Gospel Choir)	2021	A Very Maverick Christmas	
"Gratitude / Worthy of it All / You’re Worthy of My Praise" (Maverick City Music featuring Lake, Natalie Grant, and Mav City Gospel Choir)	2021	A Very Maverick Christmas	
"Tumbas a Jardines" (Maverick City Música featuring Lake and Edgar Aguilar)	2022	Venga Tu Reino (Deluxe)	
"Where Would I Be?" (Tribl and Maverick City Music featuring Dante Bowe, Ryan Ofei, and Lake)	2022	Tribl Nights Anthologies	
"The One You Love" (Maverick City Music and Kirk Franklin featuring Lake, Bowe, and Chandler Moore)	2022	Kingdom Book One	
"Why We Sing" (Maverick City Music and Kirk Franklin featuring Brandon Lake)	2022	Kingdom Book One	
"Under the Blood" (Maverick City Music and Kirk Franklin featuring Lake and Moore)	2022	Kingdom Book One (Deluxe)	
"Lion" (Elevation Worship featuring Chris Brown and Lake)	2022	Lion: Live from the Loft	
"Same God" (Elevation Worship featuring Jonsal Barrientes and Lake)	2022	Lion: Live from the Loft	
"Blessings Everywhere" (Elevation Worship featuring Lake)	2022	Lion: Live from the Loft	
"Gratitude" (Passion and Lake)	2023	I've Witnessed It	
"Abandoned" (Benjamin William Hastings and Lake)	2024	Sold Out, Sincerely	
"Courage" (Seacoast featuring Lake)	2024	Courage	
"Stand" (Rascal Flatts featuring Lake)	2025	Life Is a Highway: Refueled Duets	
