= God Is Not Against Me =

2023 song by Brandon Lake

Song by Brandon Lake

from the album Coat of Many Colors
- Released: October 20, 2024
- Genre: Christian R&B
- Length: 4:43
- Label: Provident Label Group
- Songwriters: Pat Barrett; Chris Davenport; Steven Furtick; Brandon Lake
- Producers: Jacob Sooter; Hank Bentley

Music videos
- "God Is Not Against Me" (Lyrics) on YouTube
- "God Is Not Against Me" (Song Session) on YouTube

"God Is Not Against Me" is a song by Brandon Lake. It was released as the seventh track on his fourth studio album, Coat of Many Colors (2023). Lake co-wrote the song with Chris Davenport, Pat Barrett, and Steven Furtick. Jacob Sooter and Hank Bentley worked on the production of the single.

The song was notably covered by Elevation Worship, who released their version of the song as the fourth single from their live album, When Wind Meets Fire (2024). Elevation Worship's recording peaked at number 24 on the US Hot Christian Songs chart.

== Writing and development ==
Lake shared the story behind the song in an interview with American Songwriter, saying:

"I wasn't lying when I said there would be all different kinds of "colors" of sound on this record! "God Is Not Against Me" is one I've been so excited about! A powerful truth and a vibe of a track. And I finally got to rip my own solo. So many people think God is looking down with his finger pointed in anger, and it's just not the case. Even those who are running away God looks upon with compassion, mercy and is so quick to forgive. I want more people to know how God is for them!"

== Composition ==
"God Is Not Against Me" is a "Gospel/R&B-tinged track," composed in the key of D with a tempo of 70 beats per minute and a musical time signature of 4/4.

== Critical reception ==
Reviewing for Jesus Freak Hideout, Matthew Spiker said ""God is Not Against Me" is about how, no matter what happens in our lives, God will never be against us." Lindsay Williams in her K-Love review opined that the song "showcases the upper reaches of his vocal range with a dash of rare falsetto." Timothy Yap of JubileeCast wrote a negative review of the song, saying, "Though Lake shows his more tender side, "God is Not Against Me" suffers from banal lyrical writing:"

== Music videos ==
Brandon Lake released the lyric video for the song via YouTube on October 20, 2023. On February 27, 2024, Essential Worship published the official acoustic performance video of the song, being performed by Brandon Lake, on YouTube.

== Elevation Worship version ==
"God Is Not Against Me"

Single by Elevation Worship featuring Jonsal Barrientes and Tiffany Hudson

from the album When Wind Meets Fire
- Released: September 27, 2024
- Genre: Contemporary worship music
- Length: 5:42 (album version); 4:06 (radio version)
- Label: Provident Label Group
- Producers: Steven Furtick; Chris Brown

Elevation Worship singles chronology
"Sure Been Good" (2024)	"God Is Not Against Me" (2024)	"I Know a Name" (2025)

Jonsal Barrientes singles chronology
"Seguro Estoy" (2023)	"God Is Not Against Me" (2024)

Tiffany Hudson singles chronology
"At the Altar" (2024)	"God Is Not Against Me" (2024)	"The Wonderful Blood" (2024)

Music videos
- "God Is Not Against Me" on YouTube
- "God Is Not Against Me" (Lyrics) on YouTube

Elevation Worship released the radio version of "God Is Not Against Me" on September 27, 2024, as the fourth single from their album When Wind Meets Fire (2024).

=== Critical reception ===
Lindsay Williams in her K-Love review contrasted Elevation Worship's version with Brandon Lake's original release, saying: "“God Is Not Against Me” appears on the collective's latest LP, When Wind Meets Fire. Incidentally, Lake also recorded a soulful R&B, electric guitar-laced version of the track for his critically acclaimed Coat of Many Colors album. In contrast, Elevation Worship’s recording is naturally more congregational-friendly."

=== Commercial performance ===
"God Is Not Against Me" debuted at number 45 on the US Hot Christian Songs chart dated July 27, 2024. Following the radio version release of the song, "God Is Not Against Me" debuted at number 38 on the US Christian Airplay chart dated September 30, 2023.

=== Music videos ===
The official lyric video for "God Is Not Against Me" was issued by Elevation Worship through YouTube on July 12, 2024. Elevation Worship released the music video for "God Is Not Against Me" featuring Jonsal Barrientes and Tiffany Hudson leading the song during an Elevation Church worship service, via YouTube on July 15, 2023.

=== Weekly ===
Weekly chart performance for "God Is Not Against Me"
Chart (2024)	Peak position
US Hot Christian Songs (Billboard)	24
US Christian Airplay (Billboard)	19
US Christian AC (Billboard)	24

=== Year-end ===
Year-end chart performance for "God Is Not Against Me"
Chart (2025)	Position
US Hot Christian Songs (Billboard)	98

=== Release history ===
Release dates and formats for "God Is Not Against Me"
Region	Date	Format	Label	Ref.
Various	September 27, 2024	Digital download; streaming	Elevation Worship Records	
