= Coat of many colors (disambiguation) =

Coat of many colors may refer to:

- Coat of many colors, a biblical garment that Joseph owned
- Coat of Many Colors, an album by Dolly Parton released in 1971
  - "Coat of Many Colors" (song), a song by Dolly Parton from the album of the same name
- Coat of Many Colors (Brandon Lake album), 2023
  - "Coat of Many Colors" (Brandon Lake song), 2023
- Dolly Parton's Coat of Many Colors, a 2015 television film aired on NBC
- "Coat of Many Colors", an episode of The Naked Archaeologist aired on 12 November 2008
