= Tear Off the Roof =

2023 song by Brandon Lake

Promotional single by Brandon Lake

from the album Coat of Many Colors
- Released: October 6, 2023
- Genre: Contemporary worship music
- Length: 4:23
- Label: Provident Label Group
- Songwriters: Hank Bentley; Jordan Colle; Chris Davenport; Brandon Lake; Jacob Sooter
- Producers: Jacob Sooter; Hank Bentley

Music videos
- "Tear Off the Roof" on YouTube
- "Tear Off the Roof" (Lyrics) on YouTube
- "Tear Off the Roof" (Song Session) on YouTube

"Tear Off the Roof" is a song by Brandon Lake. The song was released on October 6, 2023, as the second promotional single from his fourth studio album, Coat of Many Colors (2023). Lake co-wrote the song with Andy Cherry, Jacob Boyles, Jonathan Smith, Leeland Mooring Jacob Sooter and Hank Bentley worked on the production of the single.

The song peaked at number 27 on the US Hot Christian Songs chart published by Billboard.

== Background ==
"Tear Off the Roof" was released as the second promotional single from the album, along with its accompanying music video, which features the cast and characters of The Chosen, on October 6, 2023.

== Writing and development ==
Lake shared the story behind the song in an interview with American Songwriter, saying:

"This track speaks to multiple stories in the Bible of healing. I can't think of a better storyteller of Jesus than The Chosen TV series and I got to partner up with them for the music video to share the story of this song based on Mark Chapter 2 and Luke Chapter 8. We pray this song reminds you of the healing power of Jesus and to do whatever it takes, even tearing off the roof to get those in need in the presence of God."

== Composition ==
"Tear Off the Roof" is composed in the key of C with a tempo of 69 beats per minute and a musical time signature of 4/4.

== Critical reception ==
Timothy Yap in his JubileeCast review wrote: "Bringing us right into the room where Christ raises the paralytic, we can't help but sing along." Reviewing for Jesus Freak Hideout, Matthew Spiker said "it effectively conveys the story presented from the Bible and even gets an assist from the popular television show The Chosen when creating the music video." Lindsay Williams in her K-Love review wrote: "the lyrically rich "Tear Off the Roof" borrows intense imagery from two of Scripture's most memorable stories: the man whose friends lift him through the roof of the house to get to Jesus, and the woman who touches the hem of Jesus' garment in search of healing." In a NewReleaseToday review, Jasmin Patterson said "Tear Off the Roof" is the best song on the album, saying "This song meets me in a season when I desperately need to be reminded to run to Jesus and that there is power in His presence to meet every need I have. And if you need that same encouragement or some helpful language to form your prayers, I know this song will impact you, too."

== Commercial performance ==
"Tear Off the Roof" debuted at number 27 on the US Hot Christian Songs chart dated October 21, 2023, concurrently charting at number two on the Christian Digital Song Sales chart.

== Music videos ==
Brandon Lake released the official music video of "Tear Off the Roof" through their YouTube channel on October 6, 2023. Lake also released the lyric video for the song via YouTube on the same day. On January 5, 2024, Essential Worship published the official acoustic performance video of the song, being performed by Brandon Lake, on YouTube.

== Track listing ==
"Tear Off the Roof"
No.	Title	Writer(s)	Producer(s)	Length
1.	"Tear Off the Roof"	Hank Bentley; Jordan Colle; Chris Davenport; Brandon Lake; Jacob Sooter	Jacob Sooter; Hank Bentley	4:23
2.	"Coat of Many Colors"	Jacob Boyles; Andrew Cherry; Steven Furtick; Lake; Leeland Mooring; Jonathan Smith	Jonathan Smith; Jacob Sooter	4:31
3.	"Count 'Em"	Bentley; Lake; Sooter	Jacob Sooter; Hank Bentley	3:47
4.	"Praise You Anywhere"	Bentley; Ben Fielding; Lake; Sooter	Jacob Sooter; Hank Bentley	3:35
Total length:				16:18

== Personnel ==
Adapted from AllMusic.

- Aaron Sterling — drums, engineer
- Brandon Lake — background vocals, electric guitar, primary artist
- Buckley Miller — recorder
- Casey Moore — electric guitar
- Christian Walker — choir/chorus
- Dan Mackenzie — bass
- Dave Curran — bass
- David Whitworth — drums
- Denise Carite — background vocals
- Dwan Hill — vocal engineer
- Elizabeth Corrente — background vocals
- Hank Bentley — acoustic guitar, electric guitar, engineer, guitar, keyboards, producer, programmer, recorder, vocal producer
- Hope UC Gangs — keyboards, programmer
- Jacob Sooter — acoustic guitar, background vocals, engineer, keyboards, producer, programmer, recorder, vocal producer
- Jason Eskridge — background vocals, vocal engineer
- JJ Hasulube — background vocals
- Joe LaPorta — mastering engineer
- John-Paul Gentile — acoustic guitar
- Jonathan Smith — acoustic guitar, background vocals, engineer, keyboards, producer, programmer
- Kiley Phillips — background vocals
- Kimberly Thomas — choir/chorus
- Landon Wiggs — background vocals
- Leeland Mooring — background vocals, keyboards, programmer
- Mackenzie Lawhon — background vocals
- Mary Beth Sudduth — choir/chorus
- Matt Huber — mixing engineer
- Matthew Figueroa — background vocals
- McKayla Hill — background vocals
- Olivia Scroggs — background vocals
- Peirce Lyons — background vocals
- Peter Mol — acoustic guitar, keyboards, programmer
- Robbie Artress — engineer
- Robert Mauti — choir/chorus
- Scottie Mills — electric guitar
- Seany Denson — choir/chorus
- Shirley Hernandez — choir/chorus
- Taylor Johnson — electric guitar
- Tim Riordan — engineer
- Wil Merrell — background vocals
- Will Burke — background vocals
- Will Chapman — drums
- William Sanford — background vocals

== Charts ==
Chart performance for "Tear Off the Roof"
Chart (2023)	Peak position
US Hot Christian Songs (Billboard)	27

== Release history ==
Release history for "Tear Off the Roof"
Region	Date	Format	Label	Ref.
Various	October 6, 2023 (Promotional release EP)	Digital download; streaming	Provident Label Group	
