= Miracle Child (song) =

2023 song by Brandon Lake

Single by Brandon Lake

from the album Coat of Many Colors
- Released: March 22, 2024
- Genre: Contemporary worship music
- Length: 4:03
- Label: Provident Label Group
- Songwriters: Brandon Lake; Ethan Hulse; Jacob Sooter
- Producers: Jacob Sooter; Hank Bentley

Brandon Lake singles chronology
"Count 'Em (Remix)" / "Tear Off the Roof (Remix)" (2024)	"Miracle Child" (2024)	"Love of God" (2024)

Music videos
- "Miracle Child" on YouTube
- "Miracle Child" (Lyrics) on YouTube
- "Miracle Child" (Song Session) on YouTube

"Miracle Child" is a song by Brandon Lake. It was released to Christian radio in the United States as the third single from his fourth studio album, Coat of Many Colors (2023). Lake co-wrote the song with Ethan Hulse and Jacob Sooter. Jacob Sooter and Hank Bentley worked on the production of the single.

The song peaked at number 20 on the US Hot Christian Songs chart published by Billboard.

== Background ==
"Miracle Child" was released on October 20, 2023, as part of Brandon Lake's fourth studio album, Coat of Many Colors. On March 15, 2024, Provident Radio announced that "Miracle Child" will impact Christian radio stations in the United States on March 22, 2024, making it the third single from the album.

== Writing and development ==
Lake shared the story behind the song in an interview with American Songwriter, saying:

"Testimony songs will always be a part of my records because there is power in sharing your story. A unique part of my testimony is that my mom had six miscarriages, a few before I was born and a few after. After the first few, I'm grateful she never gave up on the promise that God made her, despite any doctors recommendation that she stop trying. My brother, sister and I are glad my parents kept praying and believing!"

== Composition ==
"Miracle Child" is composed in the key of D♭ with a tempo of 76 beats per minute and a musical time signature of 4/4.

== Critical reception ==
Reviewing for Jesus Freak Hideout, Matthew Spiker said "In "Miracle Child," Brandon recounts how Jesus' sacrifice and resurrection makes us all miracle children." Timothy Yap of JubileeCast listed the song as one of the prime cuts from the album, saying, "the gentle folkish "Miracle Child" reminds us how Christ's resurrection power changes our lives." Lindsay Williams in her K-Love review opined: "The poetic, faith-elevating song emphasizes God's track record of making the impossible possible and feeds into the topics that have quickly become something of a hallmark of Lake's career." In a NewReleaseToday review, Jasmin Patterson commented: ""Miracle Child" is about how God's grace miraculously brings forth a testimony and transformation in our lives that would not be the case apart from the work of Jesus."

== Commercial performance ==
"Miracle Child" debuted at number 25 on the US Hot Christian Songs chart dated November 4, 2023. Following the song's release to Christian radio, it peaked at number 20 on the US Hot Christian Songs chart.

== Music videos ==
Brandon Lake released the official music video of "Miracle Child" through his YouTube channel on October 20, 2023. Lake also released the lyric video for the song via YouTube on the same day. On October 27, 2023, Essential Worship published the official acoustic performance video of the song, being performed by Brandon Lake, on YouTube.

== Charts ==
Chart performance for "Miracle Child"
Chart (2023–2024)	Peak position
US Hot Christian Songs (Billboard)	20
US Christian Airplay (Billboard)	15
US Christian AC (Billboard)	15

== Release history ==
Release history for "Miracle Child"
Region	Date	Format	Label	Ref.
Various	March 22, 2024	Christian radio	Provident Label Group	
