= Adoption Song =

2023 song by Brandon Lake

Song by Brandon Lake

from the album Coat of Many Colors
- Released: October 20, 2024
- Genre: Contemporary worship music
- Length: 4:36
- Label: Provident Label Group
- Songwriters: Brandon Lake; Leeland Mooring; Jonathan Smith; Jacob Sooter
- Producers: Jonathan Smith; Jacob Sooter

Music videos
- "Adoption Song" (Live) on YouTube
- "Adoption Song" (Lyrics) on YouTube
- "Adoption Song" (Song Session) on YouTube

"Adoption Song" is a song by Brandon Lake. It was released as the sixth track on his fourth studio album, Coat of Many Colors (2023). Lake co-wrote the song with Ethan Hulse and Jacob Sooter. Jonathan Smith and Jacob Sooter worked on the production of the single.

The song peaked at number 49 on the US Hot Christian Songs chart published by Billboard.

== Writing and development ==
Lake shared the story behind the song in an interview with American Songwriter, saying:

"Easily one of my favorite songs on the record because you don’t hear the theme of adoption often in songs. However it is the gospel story. I wanted to write a song that in the verses would renounce lies we so easily believe. I love that it has a minor feel which makes the chorus soar as it lifts to declare that we’ve been adopted, His inheritance is ours, and we’ve found the family we were always meant to be a part of."

== Composition ==
"Adoption Song" is composed in the key of B with a tempo of 70 beats per minute and a musical time signature of 4/4.

== Critical reception ==
Reviewing for Jesus Freak Hideout, Matthew Spiker said ""Adoption Song" reminds listeners to pay no attention to those who tell you that you're not good enough or worthy of God's love, and that ever since we were born, He adopted us and loves us and we should proudly share that with others." Lindsay Williams in her K-Love review described the song as "saccharine" and that it is one of the songs on the album that "remind us of our place as children of God." In a NewReleaseToday review, Jasmin Patterson commented: "Brandon uses the lyrics of "Adoption Song" to renounce false beliefs, rebuke ungodly spirits, and align with God's truth. This is a unique and powerful spiritual practice and discipleship lesson for listeners."

== Commercial performance ==
"Adoption Song" debuted at number 49 on the US Hot Christian Songs chart dated November 4, 2023.

== Music videos ==
Brandon Lake released the lyric video for the song via YouTube on October 20, 2023. On February 26, 2024, Essential Worship published the official acoustic performance video of the song, being performed by Brandon Lake, on YouTube. Lake released the official live performance video of "Adoption Song" recorded at Vevo Studios in New York, through his YouTube channel on September 20, 2024.

== Charts ==
Chart performance for "Adoption Song"
Chart (2023)	Peak position
US Hot Christian Songs (Billboard)	49
