= When a Cowboy Prays =

Single by Brandon Lake
- Released: September 26, 2025
- Genre: Country; southern gospel
- Length: 3:57
- Label: Provident; Sony
- Songwriters: Lake; Derrick Southerland; Hank Bentley; Jacob Sooter
- Producers: Bentley; Sooter

Brandon Lake singles chronology
"So So Good" (2025)	"When a Cowboy Prays" (2025)	"No Idols" (2025)

Music videos
- "When a Cowboy Prays" on YouTube
- "When a Cowboy Prays" (Lyrics) on YouTube

"When a Cowboy Prays" is a song recorded by Brandon Lake. The song was officially released on September 26, 2025, via Provident and Sony. It was written by Lake, Derrick Southerland, Hank Bentley, and Jacob Sooter, and produced by Bentley and Sooter. On January 9, 2026, a remix of the song featuring Cody Johnson was released.

== Release and promotion ==
Lake wrote "When a Cowboy Prays" in July 2025 while on the Summer Worship Nights Tour. A week following the song being written, he performed it at a date on the tour, and later hinted at a demo of the song being recorded in the future. It was officially released on September 26, 2025. In December 2025, Lake announced while performing a concert that he and Johnson were in the process of recording a collaborative version of the song. Later that month, Lake announced the scheduled release date.

"When a Cowboy Prays" was supported by the release of both a music video and a lyric video. The single featured three remixes of the song, including an acoustic remix, the original demo of the song, and the instrumental.

== Writing and development ==
"When a Cowboy Prays" demonstrates the styles of country and southern gospel music. Grant Bromley of Country Music Nation noted that the song contains "imagery of the West", with Lake "singing of the eternal truth of God’s love for His children." Jason Witt of Air1 observed that the song contains "raw, cinematic storytelling," and "leans heavily into country influences." When he first performed the song live, Lake explained that the song's meaning is written about how, "there’s just certain people out there when you hear them pray, it moves mountains." The song is based on the Bible passage James 5:16, which states, "Therefore confess your sins to each other and pray for each other so that you may be healed. The prayer of a righteous person is powerful and effective."

Running for a length of 3:57, the song is composed in the key of B, with a speed of 65 beats per minute and a time signature of 4/4. It was written by Lake, Southerland, Bentley, and Sooter, while Bentley and Sooter produced. It was mastered by Jase Keithley and Joe LaPorta, and mixed by Sean Moffitt.

== Music video ==
The music video for "When a Cowboy Prays" was released alongside the release of the single. The video depicts a farmer, who is distressed because of the difficulty of maintaining both his farm and family. In his frustration, he becomes upset at his sons. He reads his Bible after neglecting it for considerable time, and it leads him to apologize and restore the relationships which he had lost.

== Commercial performance ==
Within its first charting week, "When a Cowboy Prays" debuted at No. 7 on the Billboard Hot Christian Songs chart, simultaneously appearing at entries of No. 3 on the Christian Digital Song Sales chart and No. 12 on the Christian Streaming Songs chart. It concurrently peaked at No. 46 on the Hot Country Songs chart, supported by a peak of 3 on the Country Digital Song Sales chart. On the overall Digital Song Sales chart, it peaked at No. 8.

== Track listing ==
All tracks are written by Lake, Derrick Southerland, Hank Bentley, and Jacob Sooter, and produced by Bentley and Sooter, unless otherwise noted.

No.	Title	Producer	Length
1.	"When a Cowboy Prays"		3:57
2.	"When a Cowboy Prays" (acoustic)	Micah Nichols	4:08
3.	"When a Cowboy Prays" (original demo)		4:20
4.	"When a Cowboy Prays" (instrumental)		3:57
Total length:			16:20

== Personnel ==
Credits adapted from Tidal Music.

=== Studio recording ===
- Aaron Sterling – drums, percussion, recording engineer
- Brandon Lake – writer, lead vocals
- Derrick Southerland – writer
- Hank Bentley – producer, writer, acoustic guitar, electric guitar, recording engineer
- Ilya Toshinskiy – acoustic guitar, electric guitar
- Jacob Sooter – producer, writer, electric guitar, keyboards, recording engineer
- Jase Keithley – mastering
- Joe LaPorta – mastering
- Josh Reedy – background vocals
- Justin Schipper – steel guitar
- Sean Moffitt – mixing
- Tony Lucido – bass guitar

=== Acoustic recording ===
- Brandon Lake – writer, guitar, lead vocals
- Derrick Southerland – writer
- Hank Bentley – writer
- Jacob Sooter – writer
- Jonah Thompson – recording engineer
- Luke Hendrickson – editor, mixer
- Matthew Delemos – recording engineer
- Micah Nichols – producer
- Phil Wickham – background vocals
- Sam Moses – mastering

=== Demo recording ===
- Brandon Lake – writer, lead vocals
- Christian Paschall – drums, recording engineer
- Derrick Southerland – writer
- Hank Bentley – producer, writer, acoustic guitar, electric guitar, recording engineer
- Jacob Sooter – producer, writer, bass, electric guitar, keyboards, recording engineer
- Jase Keithley – mixing
- Joe LaPorta – mastering
- Sean Moffitt – mixing

=== Instrumental ===
- Aaron Sterling – drums, percussion, recording engineer
- Brandon Lake – writer
- Derrick Southerland – writer
- Hank Bentley – producer, writer, acoustic guitar, electric guitar, recording engineer
- Ilya Toshinskiy – acoustic guitar, electric guitar
- Jacob Sooter – producer, writer, electric guitar, keyboards, recording engineer
- Jase Keithley – mastering
- Joe LaPorta – mastering
- Justin Schipper – steel guitar
- Sean Moffitt – mixing
- Tony Lucido – bass

== Charts ==
Weekly chart performance for "When a Cowboy Prays"
Chart (2025–26)	Peak position
US Bubbling Under Hot 100 (Billboard)	6
US Country Airplay (Billboard)	41
US Hot Christian Songs (Billboard)	4
US Hot Country Songs (Billboard)	43

== Release history ==
Release history and formats for "When a Cowboy Prays"
Region	Date	Format(s)	Label(s)	Ref.
Various	September 26, 2025	Digital download; streaming	Provident; Sony	
