= Love of God (song) =

2024 song by Brandon Lake and Phil Wickham

Single by Brandon Lake and Phil Wickham
- Released: June 28, 2024
- Genre: Contemporary worship music
- Length: 5:24; 7:48 (live)
- Label: Provident Label Group
- Songwriters: Brandon Lake; Benjamin William Hastings; Cody Carnes; Phil Wickham
- Producer: Jonathan Smith

Brandon Lake singles chronology
"Miracle Child" (2024)	"Love of God" (2024)	"Hands Up to Heaven" (2024)

Phil Wickham singles chronology
"Just Too Good" (2023)	"Love of God" (2024)	"Angels (Glory to God)" (2024)

Music videos
- "Love of God" on YouTube
- "Love of God" (Live) on YouTube
- "Love of God" (Lyrics) on YouTube
- "Love of God" (Song Sessions) on YouTube

"Love of God" is a song by Brandon Lake and Phil Wickham. It was released as a standalone single on June 28, 2024. Lake and Wickham co-wrote the song with Benjamin William Hastings and Cody Carnes. Jonathan Smith handled the production of the single.

The song peaked at number 20 on the US Hot Christian Songs chart published by Billboard.

== Background ==
On June 28, 2024, Brandon Lake and Phil Wickham released "Love of God" as a standalone single. The single was released ahead of the Summer Worship Nights Tour in August 2024. The song marked the second collaboration between Lake and Wickham for the Summer Worship Nights Tour, following the release of "People of Heaven" in 2023.

== Composition ==
"Love of God" is composed in the key of G♭ with a tempo of 74 beats per minute and a musical time signature of 4/4.

== Critical reception ==
Joshua Andre, reviewing for 365 Days of Inspiring Media review, wrote a positive review of the song, saying: "The Easter themed melody recounts that it is Jesus' love that led him to die on the cross and to rise again for our sinsl it is the biblical and ever-true lyrics that impress me greatly."

== Commercial performance ==
"Love of God" debuted at number 20 on the US Hot Christian Songs chart dated July 13, 2024, concurrently charting at number two on the Christian Digital Song Sales chart.

== Music videos ==
Brandon Lake premiered the official lyric video for the song via YouTube on June 28, 2024. Lake released the official music video for "Love of God" via YouTube on July 1, 2024.

Essential Worship issued the official Song Sessions video for the song featuring Lake and Wickham via YouTube on July 8, 2024. On October 25, 2024, Brandon Lake published the live performance video of "Love of God" on YouTube.

== Track listing ==
"Love of God" — EP
No.	Title	Length
1.	"Love of God"	5:24
2.	"Love of God" (Song Session; with Essential Worship)	5:20
3.	"Love of God" (instrumental version)	5:24
4.	"Love of God" (acapella version)	5:11
Total length:		21:19

"Love of God" (Live)
No.	Title	Length
1.	"Love of God" (live)	7:48
2.	"Intro + Love of God" (live)	10:08
Total length:		17:56

== Personnel ==
Adapted from AllMusic.

- Brandon Lake – primary artist
- Court Clement – acoustic guitar, electric guitar
- Courtlan Clement – acoustic guitar, electric guitar
- David Ramirez – keyboards
- Devonne Fowlkes – background vocals
- Jacob Arnold – drums
- Jacob Lowery – bass guitar
- Jason Eskridge – arranger, background vocals, editing, engineer
- John Denosky – editing
- Jonathan Smith – piano, producer, programmer
- Joshua Frerichs – programmer
- Kristen Rogers – background vocals
- Luke Skaggs – acoustic guitar
- Mark Suhoen – programmer
- Matt Huber – mixing engineer
- Moiba Mustapha – background vocals
- Phil Wickham – primary artist
- Sam Moses – mastering engineer
- Taylor Johnson – electric guitar
- Whitney Coleman – background vocals

== Charts ==
Chart performance for "Love of God"
Chart (2024)	Peak position
US Hot Christian Songs (Billboard)	20

== Release history ==
Release history for "Love of God"
Region	Version	Date	Format	Label	Ref.
Various	EP	June 28, 2024	Digital download; streaming	Provident Label Group	
Various	Live	August 26, 2024	Digital download; streaming	Provident Label Group	
