= Chris Renzema =

American singer-songwriter

- Origin: Grand Rapids, Michigan, US
- Genre: Christian/Gospel
- Years active: 2015–present
- Label: Centricity Music
- Website: https://chrisrenzema.com

Christopher David Renzema (pronounced /ˈrɛnzima/ or [REN-zē-ma]) is a singer/songwriter and performer based in Nashville, Tennessee. Chris grew up in Grand Rapids, Michigan. He blends aspects of Indie Rock, Contemporary Christian, and Folk among other musical influences.

His early work includes an EP titled Age To Age, which was released in 2014 (as the duo Chris Renzema & Moriah Hazeltine), and a single, Son Of God. His debut album, I'll Be The Branches, was released independently in 2018. In December 2018, Renzema announced he would be signing with Centricity Music. Since then he has put out three more albums, Let the Ground Rest, released in 2020, Get Out of the Way of Your Own Heart in 2021, and Manna Pt. 1 in August 2023, with the full-length follow-up Manna in March 2024, including songs from Pt. 1.

He has been nominated for four GMA Dove awards, with Manna winning best album in the Rock/Contemporary category in 2024.

== Discography ==
=== Singles ===
- Son of God (2017)
- Jacob/HTBY (2019)
- Caught In The Reeds (Moses) (2021)
- Mary & Joseph (2022)
- God & Prozac (August 2023)
- Come Back To Me (Father's Song) (2025)

=== Extended plays (EPs) ===
- Age to Age (2014)
- Let The Ground Rest B-Sides (2021)
- HOPE OR NOSTALGIA LIVE (2021)
- Manna Pt.1 (2023)

=== Albums ===
- I'll Be The Branches (2018)
- Let the Ground Rest (2020)
- Get Out of the Way of Your Own Heart (2021)
- Manna (2024)
- Every December (2025)

== Awards ==
=== GMA Dove Awards ===
Year	Award	Result
2020	New Artist of the Year	Nominated
2022	Rock/Contemporary Album of the Year	Nominated
2024	Rock/Contemporary Album of the Year	Won
2024	Rock/Contemporary Recorded Song of the Year	Nominated
