= Coat of Many Colors (Brandon Lake song) =

2023 song by Brandon Lake

Promotional single by Brandon Lake

from the album Coat of Many Colors
- Released: September 8, 2023
- Genre: Contemporary worship music
- Length: 4:31
- Label: Provident Label Group
- Songwriters: Jacob Boyles; Andrew Cherry; Steven Furtick; Brandon Lake; Leeland Mooring; Jonathan Smith
- Producers: Jonathan Smith; Jacob Sooter

Music videos
- "Coat of Many Colors" on YouTube
- "Coat of Many Colors" (Lyrics) on YouTube

"Coat of Many Colors" is a song by Brandon Lake. The song was released on September 8, 2023, as the first promotional single from his fourth studio album of the same name (2023). Lake co-wrote the song with Andy Cherry, Jacob Boyles, Jonathan Smith, Leeland Mooring, and Steven Furtick. Jonathan Smith and Jacob Sooter worked on the production of the single.

The song peaked at number 20 on the US Hot Christian Songs chart published by Billboard.

== Background ==
On August 30, 2023, Lake announced Coat of Many Colors as his then-upcoming album, being availed for pre-order and was slated for release on October 20, 2023, and the title track was slated for released as a promotional single on September 8. "Coat of Many Colors" was released as the second single from the album, along with its accompanying music video, on September 8, 2023.

== Writing and development ==
Lake shared the story behind the song in an interview with American Songwriter, saying:

"I’ve always found the story of Joseph interesting and relatable. As a young boy I felt that God gave me dreams that weren’t always easy to share with others in fear that they’d laugh or possibly even feel intimidated by them. After trying to write this song several different ways, something finally broke open when I sat down with my friends Leeland Mooring and Jonathan Smith. There’s a certain season for songs and I’m grateful that this one came at the right time, reminding us that we can have confidence in who God has called us to be. We’re all clothed in His coat of many colors."

== Composition ==
"Coat of Many Colors" is a pop-centric song with a soft rock tune. is composed in the key of D with a tempo of 68 beats per minute and a musical time signature of 4/4.

== Reception ==
=== Critical response ===
Timothy Yap in his JubileeCast review wrote: "Coupled with a catchy soft-rock tune, "Coat of Many Colors" parallels Joseph's experience and ours in Christ in stunning ways." Reviewing for Jesus Freak Hideout, Matthew Spiker said "The title track bears homage to the story of Joseph and his coat of many colors, with Brandon even describing his own coat bestowed to him by God, and is a decent opener -- even if the bridge gets a bit repetitive."

=== Accolades ===
Awards and nominations
Year	Organization	Award	Result	Ref
2024	GMA Dove Awards	Short Form Music Video of the Year (Performance)	Nominated	

== Commercial performance ==
"Coat of Many Colors" debuted at number 20 on the US Hot Christian Songs chart dated September 23, 2023, concurrently charting at number two on the Christian Digital Song Sales chart.

== Music videos ==
Brandon Lake released the official music video of "Coat of Many Colors" through their YouTube channel on September 8, 2023. Lake also released the lyric video for the song via YouTube on the same day.

== Performances ==
Brandon Lake performed an acoustic take of "Coat of Many Colors" on the Grammy's Positive Vibes Only web series on October 23, 2023.

== Track listing ==
"Coat of Many Colors"
No.	Title	Writer(s)	Producer(s)	Length
1.	"Coat of Many Colors"	Jacob Boyles; Andrew Cherry; Steven Furtick; Brandon Lake; Leeland Mooring; Jonathan Smith	Jonathan Smith; Jacob Sooter	4:31
2.	"Count 'Em"	Hank Bentley; Lake; Jacob Sooter	Jacob Sooter; Hank Bentley	3:47
3.	"Praise You Anywhere"	Bentley; Ben Fielding; Lake; Sooter	Jacob Sooter; Hank Bentley	3:35
Total length:				11:54

== Charts ==
Chart performance for "Coat of Many Colors"
Chart (2023)	Peak position
US Hot Christian Songs (Billboard)	20

== Release history ==
Release history for "Coat of Many Colors"
Region	Date	Format	Label	Ref.
Various	September 8, 2023 (Promotional release)	Digital download; streaming	Provident Label Group	
