= This Is a Move =

2019 song by Tasha Cobbs Leonard

Single by Tasha Cobbs Leonard
- Released: January 25, 2019
- Recorded: 2018
- Genre: Urban contemporary gospel
- Length: 7:25
- Label: Capitol CMG
- Songwriter(s): Tasha Cobbs Leonard; Nate Moore; Tony Brown; Brandon Lake
- Producer(s): Kenneth Leonard, Jr.

Tasha Cobbs Leonard singles chronology
"Your Spirit" (2019)	"This Is a Move" (2019)	"O Holy Night" (2020)

Music video
- "This Is a Move" (Live) on YouTube

"This Is a Move" is a song by Tasha Cobbs Leonard, which was released as a standalone single on January 25, 2019. Cobbs Leonard co-wrote the song with Brandon Lake, Nate Moore, and Tony Brown. Kenneth Leonard Jr. handled the production of the single.

The song was a commercial success, debuting at number four on the Billboard's Hot Gospel Songs chart, spending twenty-six weeks on the chart. The song was number 33 on the year-end Hot Gospel Songs chart for 2019. "This Is a Move" won the GMA Dove Award Gospel Worship Recorded Song of the Year in the 2019 GMA Dove Awards. "This Is a Move" earned a Grammy Award nomination for Best Gospel Performance/Song in the 2020 Grammy Awards, and the Stellar Award for Song of the Year at the 2020 Stellar Awards.

Brandon Lake released the song as his debut single with Bethel Music on June 28, 2019. The song peaked on number 36 on the US Hot Christian Songs chart, spending eighteen weeks on the chart.

== Background ==
Cobbs Leonard shared the story behind the song in an interview with Larissa Mendoza of Get Up! Mornings With Erica Campbell, saying:

My husband and I, we were invited to a writing session in Atlanta. So we drove down to some of the guys and we were sitting in a room... One of the guys, his name is Brandon Lake, he said "Y'all I have this song that God gave me last night, it has two verses." He started singing "Mountains are still being moved," and immediately we felt the presence of God. Him and I, and a couple of other guys, we just sat and we started doing a verse and a chorus. We felt the presence of God so strong. I just took it on the road and started putting it in my set. People were really blessed around the world, and there were so many testimonies happening. I really felt like I need to release this because there is a move of God happening and I believe that in my heart. We're about to see miracles, signs and wonders.

== Composition ==
"This Is a Move" is composed in the key of A♭ with a moderate tempo of 69 beats per minute and a musical time signature of 6/8. Cobbs Leonard's vocal range spans from E♭_{3} to F_{5}.

== Music video ==
Tasha Cobbs Leonard released the live music video of "This Is a Move" through their YouTube channel on January 25, 2019.

== Accolades ==
Awards
Year	Organization	Award	Result	Ref
2019	GMA Dove Awards	Gospel Worship Recorded Song of the Year	Won	
2020	Grammy Awards	Best Gospel Performance/Song	Nominated	
2020	Stellar Awards	Song of the Year	Nominated	

== Charts ==
=== Weekly charts ===
Chart (2019)	Peak position
US Gospel Songs (Billboard)	4

=== Year-end charts ===
Chart (2019)	Position
US Gospel Songs (Billboard)	33

== Release history ==
Region	Date	Format	Label	Ref.
Various	January 25, 2019	Digital download; streaming	Capitol Christian Music Group	

== Brandon Lake version ==
"This Is a Move"

Single by Brandon Lake
- Released: June 28, 2019
- Recorded: 2018
- Genre: Contemporary worship music
- Length: 3:42
- Label: Bethel Music
- Producer(s): David Leonard

Brandon Lake singles chronology
"New Stories" (2018)	"This Is a Move" (2019)	"We Praise You" (2020)

Music video
- "This Is a Move" (Live) on Apple Music

On June 28, 2019, Brandon Lake released his own rendition of "This Is a Move" via Bethel Music as a standalone single. David Leonard produced Lake's single.

=== Artwork ===
Stephen James Hart, the art director and visual worship leader for Bethel Music, shared on his blog the story of the single artwork for Lake's rendition of the song. Hart worked with Suzzane Ecker and Lake on multiple covers before arriving at the final result, which captured "the tension between creativity and clarity."

=== Composition ===
"This Is a Move" is composed in the key of G with a moderate tempo of 74 beats per minute and a musical time signature of 6/8.

=== Commercial performance ===
"This Is a Move" became Lake's first charting single, making its debut at number 41 on Billboard's Hot Christian Songs Chart dated July 13, 2019. The song peaked at number 36 on the September 28-dated chart, and spent a total of eighteen non-consecutive weeks on Hot Christian Songs Chart.

=== Music video ===
The live music video of the song, performed by Lake in a worship service at Bethel Church, was released on Apple Music on July 5, 2019.

=== Track listing ===
This Is a Move
No.	Title	Length
1.	"This Is a Move"	3:42

This Is a Move (Deluxe) — Apple Music exclusive
No.	Title	Length
1.	"This Is a Move"	3:42
2.	"This Is a Move" (Live)	7:31
3.	"This Is a Move" (Live Music Video)	7:25
Total length:		18:38

=== Charts ===
Chart (2019–2020)	Peak position
US Christian Songs (Billboard)	36

=== Release history ===
Region	Date	Version	Format	Label	Ref.
Various	June 28, 2019	Standard	Digital download; streaming	Bethel Music	
Various	July 5, 2020	Deluxe	Digital download; streaming	Bethel Music	

== Other versions ==
- Bethel Music released an instrumental version of the song on their album, Without Words: Genesis, on November 15, 2019.
- On July 3, 2020, Housefires released their own rendition of "This Is a Move" which featured Nate Moore and Katie Torwalt on their album, Housefires + Friends (2020).
