= Munson Steed =

American newspaper publisher and CEO

Munson Steed is an American media executive, publisher, and entrepreneur. He is the founder and CEO of Steed Media Group, a multimedia company based in Atlanta, Georgia. Steed Media's flagship publication is Rolling Out, a free weekly urban lifestyle and entertainment magazine that primarily targets African American audiences. The publication is distributed in over 19 cities across the United States and maintains a significant online presence. Rolling Out has been recognized as one of the largest Black-owned urban lifestyle publications in the United States.

== Career ==
Steed is a graduate of Morehouse College in Atlanta, Georgia, where he earned a bachelor's degree in political science.

In 2010, Steed was appointed Director of the Madison Avenue Initiative (MAI), a program of the National Action Network that focuses on promoting fairness in advertising and improving representation of minority-owned media outlets.

Over the years, Steed has led Steed Media Group in expanding its operations from traditional print journalism to include digital media, branded content, video production, and event platforms.

In 2021, Steed partnered with BlackBookStore.com and Penguin Random House for the #AmplifyBlackStories initiative, designed to increase the visibility of Black authors and literature.

== Children’s media ==
Steed is the creator of the Little Professor Skye children's book series, a collection focused on early childhood education and positive representation of Black children. The books were featured at the African-American Family Book Expo and helped launch Playful Genius, a brand that includes toys, stickers, and culturally relevant media for children.

== Music and events ==
In 2023, Steed collaborated with Grammy Award–winning gospel singer Koryn Hawthorne on the song Look At God, which peaked at number three on the Billboard Gospel charts.

In 2024, he hosted the first Black Artificial Intelligence Conference, which brought together tech leaders, celebrities, and innovators at Morehouse College to highlight Black representation in the AI industry.

In 2025, Steed moderated a discussion with actor Greg Tarzan Davis and the cast of Mission: Impossible – The Final Reckoning during a Rolling Out screening and community event.
