= Almond Eyes =

2021 EP by Brandon Lake

EP by Brandon Lake
- Released: February 5, 2021
- Recorded: 2020
- Genre: Contemporary Christian music
- Length: 19:29
- Label: Bethel Music
- Producers: David Leonard; Brad King; Seth Talley; Lael

Brandon Lake chronology
House of Miracles (Live) (2021)	Almond Eyes (2021)	Help! (2022)

Almond Eyes is the first extended play by American contemporary worship musician Brandon Lake. The EP was released on February 5, 2021, via Bethel Music. The album was produced by David Leonard, Brad King, Seth Talley, and Lael.

== Background ==
Brandon Lake released Almond Eyes on February 5, 2021, without prior promotion in the lead-up to its release. The extended play was released as a surprise tenth wedding anniversary gift to his wife, Brittany.

== Track listing ==
All tracks were written by Brandon Lake, except where noted. All tracks were produced by David Leonard, Brad King, and Seth Talley, except where noted.

Almond Eyes
No.	Title	Writer(s)	Producer(s)	Length
1.	"Almond Eyes"			3:48
2.	"You'd Think I'd Learn"			3:38
3.	"Loving Rich"			4:23
4.	"Set of 2"	Lake; Jeff Schneeweis	Lael	3:38
5.	"Goodnight for Now"			4:00
Total length:				19:29

== Release history ==
Region	Date	Format	Label	Ref.
Various	February 5, 2021	CD; digital download; streaming	Bethel Music	
