= People of Heaven =

2024 song by Phil Wickham and Brandon Lake

Single by Phil Wickham and Brandon Lake
- Released: July 28, 2023
- Genre: Contemporary worship music
- Length: 4:12
- Label: Fair Trade Services
- Songwriters: Brandon Breitenbach; Brandon Lake; Phil Wickham
- Producer: Aaron Robertson

Phil Wickham singles chronology
"The Jesus Way" (2023)	"People of Heaven" (2023)	"Manger Throne" (2023)

Brandon Lake singles chronology
"Praise You Anywhere" (2023)	"People of Heaven" (2023)	"Count 'Em" (2023)

Music video
- "People of Heaven" (Audio) on YouTube

"People of Heaven" is a song by Phil Wickham and Brandon Lake. It was released as a standalone single on July 28, 2023. Lake and Wickham co-wrote the song with Brandon Breitenbach. Aaron Robertson handled the production of the single.

The song peaked at number 40 on the US Hot Christian Songs chart published by Billboard.

== Background ==
On July 28, 2023, Brandon Lake and Phil Wickham released "People of Heaven" as a standalone single. The song was written for the purpose of closing out the Summer Worship Nights Tour dates, in August 2023.

== Composition ==
"People of Heaven" is composed in the key of D♭ with a tempo of 128 beats per minute and a musical time signature of 4/4.

== Critical reception ==
Joshua Andre, reviewing for 365 Days of Inspiring Media review, wrote a positive review of the song, saying: "I have high hopes for any Phil Wickham song, but sadly, this melody isn’t up to my lofty standards. That's not to say it's not good, this melody is still enjoyable and catchy. But it's not near-flawless like every other Phil Wickham song." Writing for Air1, Scott Savage opined "The song certainly makes you want to move and the tone is intended to bring joy and vibrancy when listened to or sung in a group. Beyond good vibes, the song intends to remind listeners of what Jesus has done for us and what we’ve received from Him in our salvation."

== Commercial performance ==
"People of Heaven" debuted at number 40 on the US Hot Christian Songs chart dated August 12, 2023, concurrently charting at number eight on the Christian Digital Song Sales chart.

== Music video ==
Phil Wickham published the official audio video for the song via YouTube on June 28, 2024.

== Charts ==
Chart performance for "People of Heaven"
Chart (2024)	Peak position
US Hot Christian Songs (Billboard)	40

== Release history ==
Release history for "People of Heaven"
Region	Date	Format	Label	Ref.
Various	July 28, 2023	Digital download; streaming	Provident Label Group	
