= Coat of Many Colors (Brandon Lake album) =

2023 studio album by Brandon Lake

Studio album by Brandon Lake
- Released: October 20, 2023
- Recorded: 2022–2023
- Genres: Contemporary worship; CCM; Christian rock; Christian R&B; Christian country
- Length: 73:07
- Label: Provident Label Group
- Producers: Hank Bentley; Jacob Sooter; Joe LaPorta; Jonathan Smith; Micah Nichols

Brandon Lake chronology
Song Sessions (2022)	Coat of Many Colors (2023)	Apple Music Nashville Sessions (2024)

Singles from Coat of Many Colors
- 1. "Praise You Anywhere" Released: June 9, 2023; 2. "Count 'Em" Released: August 4, 2023; 3. "Miracle Child" Released: March 22, 2024

Coat of Many Colors is the fourth studio album by American contemporary worship musician Brandon Lake, released via Provident Label Group on October 20, 2023. The album features a guest appearance by Benjamin William Hastings. The production of the album was handled by Hank Bentley, Jacob Sooter, Joe LaPorta, Jonathan Smith, and Micah Nichols.

The album was supported by the release of "Praise You Anywhere," "Count 'Em," and "Miracle Child" as singles. "Praise You Anywhere" reached number one on the US Hot Christian Songs chart. "Count 'Em" peaked at number 19 on the Hot Christian Songs chart. "Miracle Child" peaked at number 20 on the Hot Christian Songs chart. "Coat of Many Colors" and "Tear Off the Roof" were released as promotional singles. The title track peaked at number 20 on the Hot Christian Songs chart. "Tear Off the Roof" peaked at number 27 on the Hot Christian Songs chart. The album was also promoted by the Coat of Many Colors Tour in 2023 and the Tear Off the Roof Tour in 2024, spanning cities across the United States.

Coat of Many Colors was a commercial success upon its release, debuting at number one on Billboard's Top Christian Albums chart in the United States, with 9,000 equivalent album units sold in its first week. The album debuted at number nine on the Official Charts' Official Christian & Gospel Albums Chart in the United Kingdom. At the 2024 GMA Dove Awards, the album won the GMA Dove Award Pop/Contemporary Album of the Year and was nominated for Recorded Music Packaging of the Year, while "Praise You Anywhere" got nominated for the Song of the Year and Worship Recorded Song of the Year awards, and "Count 'Em" got nominated for Rock/Contemporary Recorded Song of the Year award. The album was nominated for Billboard Music Award for Top Christian Album at the 2024 Billboard Music Awards. Coat of Many Colors garnered a nomination for the Grammy Award for Best Contemporary Christian Music Album at the 2025 Grammy Awards.

== Background ==
On April 12, 2023, Provident Entertainment announced that they had signed Lake to their artist roster. Lake had released two studio albums prior to signing with Provident: House of Miracles (2020) containing his first solo chart-topping song "Gratitude", and Help! (2022). Following the Provident signing, Lake released a live rendition of "Talking to Jesus" with Thomas Rhett as a standalone single on May 12, 2023. "Talking to Jesus" debuted at No. 26 on the US Hot Christian Songs chart dated May 27, 2023, and it was Lake's highest debut streaming week in his career. On August 30, 2023, Lake announced Coat of Many Colors as his then-upconimng album, being availed for pre-order and was slated for release on October 20, 2023.

== Writing and development ==
Leading up to the release of Help! in May 2022, Lake shared in an interview with K-Love that Help was initially intended to be a hold-people-over extended play of three songs that became a nine-song record, indicating that "a ‘proper’ long-form follow-up collection is in the works." In an interview with Billboard following his single "Gratitude" spending four weeks at number one on Hot Christian Songs chart in February 2023, Lake shared that he was in the process of narrowing the songs to be included on the upcoming album and begin with pre-production. On July 31, 2023, Lake shared on an Instagram live stream that the album was inspired by the biblical story of Joseph, who received a "coat of many colors" from Jacob, saying "I was thinking of how we are all wrapped in a coat of many colors; we are clothed in the Father's love and His pride for us. Every single one of us is His favorite."

== Music and lyrics ==
In an interview with People, Lake mentioned that the album contains R&B, Christian country, rock, and pop sounds. Lindsay Williams of K-Love described the album as "leaning into a variety of sonic influences to create more of a boundary-pushing CCM pop project than a straightforward modern worship album." Williams noted that Lake "borrows powerful symbolism from the biblical story of Joseph for the title-cut and opening track, the pit-to-palace narrative isn't woven throughout the entire set." AllMusic described the album as "set of modern praise & worship songs" with lyrical content exploring themes of "themes of faith, family, and overcoming life's struggles." Jasmin Patterson of NewReleaseToday described the album's listening experience as "a singer-songwriter, pop, and R&B album," with Lake's vocal delivery being reminiscent of Ben Rector and Coldplay.

== Artwork ==
The album cover shows Lake wear his own "coat of many colors" while standing in water, drawing inspiration from the idea of taking "rags" and turning them into "riches." The coat was designed by Greg Lauren, the nephew of fashion designer Ralph Lauren.

== Release and promotion ==
=== Singles ===
"Praise You Anywhere" was released as the lead single from the album, along with its accompanying music video, on June 9, 2023. "Praise You Anywhere" peaked at number one on the Hot Christian Songs chart. At the 2024 GMA Dove Awards, "Praise You Anywhere" got nominated for the Song of the Year and Worship Recorded Song of the Year awards.

"Count 'Em" was released as the second single from the album, along with its accompanying music video, on August 4, 2023. "Count 'Em" peaked at number 19 on the Billboard Hot Christian Songs chart. At the 2024 GMA Dove Awards, "Count 'Em" got nominated for the Rock/Contemporary Recorded Song of the Year award.

"Miracle Child" impacted Christian radio in the United States as the third single from the album. "Miracle Child" peaked at number 20 on the Billboard Hot Christian Songs chart.

=== Promotional singles ===
"Coat of Many Colors" was released as the first promotional single from the album, along with its accompanying music video, on September 8, 2023. The title track peaked at number 20 on the Hot Christian Songs chart.

"Tear Off the Roof" was released as the second promotional single from the album, along with its accompanying music video, which features the cast and characters of The Chosen, on October 6, 2023. "Tear Off the Roof" peaked at number 27 on the Billboard Hot Christian Songs chart.

=== Other songs ===
The official music video for "Kids" was released via YouTube on November 14, 2023.

The official music video for "More" featuring Benjamin William Hastings and Leeland, was released through YouTube on December 15, 2023.

The official live video for "Adoption Song" performed by Lake at Vevo Studios in New York was released on September 20, 2024.

The official music video for "Country Psalm" was released via YouTube on November 29, 2024, in celebration of Thanksgiving.

=== Performances ===
Brandon Lake performed an acoustic take of "Coat of Many Colors" on the Grammy's Positive Vibes Only web series on October 23, 2023.

== Touring ==
On July 31, 2023, Lake announced that he will embark on the Coat of Many Colors Tour in support of the album. The tour commenced in late fall and early winter and featured Benjamin William Hastings as his special guest.

On November 20, 2023, Lake announced that he will embark on the Tear Off the Roof Tour in the spring of 2024, with Doe featuring as a special guest. The tour will span twenty cities across the United States beginning in Birmingham, Alabama, on March 7, 2024, and concluding in Charleston, South Carolina, on May 5, 2024.

== Reception ==
=== Critical response ===
Professional ratings
Review scores
Source	Rating
AllMusic	3/5 stars
Jesus Freak Hideout	4/5 stars
JubileeCast	3/5

AllMusic rated the album three stars out of five, describing the album as "another life-affirming set of modern praise & worship songs" in Lake's discography. Alex Hopper of American Songwriter commented that Lake proves he's worth the attention he has been receiving through this album, saying "He expounds on the traditional talking points of Christian music and delivers something unique for the genre—both sonically and thematically. He crafts a distinctive prayer that feels innate to Lake's own relationship with God." Reviewing for Jesus Freak Hideout, Matthew Spiker concluded: "Overall, I found the music and lyrical output of Brandon Lake's Coat Of Many Colors to be exquisite, even if none of the songs reach the level of excellence that 'Gratitude' hit on his last album. I look forward to seeing what the future holds for Brandon." Timothy Yap of JubileeCast commended Lake for "his ardent search for scripture to impart fresh and exciting truths in his songs," in his review of the album, while bemoaning the number of songs included saying "Instead of stuffing the album with C-graded songs, it may have been better to hone the album down to 10 carefully crafted tracks. Less is more." Lindsay Williams in her K-Love review concluded: "Despite the challenge of following up a once-in-a-lifetime smash like 'Gratitude,' 'Coat of Many Colors' makes it clear the multifaceted artist is far from a one-hit wonder and has plenty of surprises up his sleeve." In a NewReleaseToday review, Jasmin Patterson wrote a positive review of the album, saying "Coat of Many Colors is a testament to how Brandon Lake skillfully walks in the balance of worship leader and artist. At the same time, He can lead God's people into passionate praise and prayerful conversation with God, and he's not afraid to play in all the various sonic spaces that different genres provide."

=== Accolades ===
Awards and nominations
Year	Organization	Award	Result	Ref
2024	2024 Billboard Music Awards	Top Christian Album	Nominated	
2024	GMA Dove Awards	Pop/Contemporary Album of the Year	Won	
2024	GMA Dove Awards	Recorded Music Packaging of the Year	Nominated	
2025	Grammy Awards	Best Contemporary Christian Music Album	Nominated	

Year-end lists
Publication	Accolade	Rank	Ref.
Louder Than The Music	LTTM Album Awards 2023	7	

== Commercial performance ==
In the United States, Coat of Many Colors debuted at number one on the Top Christian Albums chart in the United States dated November 4, 2023, earning a total of 9,000 equivalent album units in sales in its first week. The album marked Lake's first number one entry on the Top Christian Albums chart. The album concurrently registered on the mainstream Billboard 200 chart at number 135, becoming Lake's first entry on the chart.

In the United Kingdom, it launched at number nine on the Official Christian & Gospel Albums Chart published by the Official Charts Company,

== Track listing ==
No.	Title	Writer(s)	Producer(s)	Length
1.	"Coat of Many Colors"	Jacob Boyles; Andrew Cherry; Steven Furtick; Brandon Lake; Leeland Mooring; Jonathan Smith	Jonathan Smith; Jacob Sooter	4:31
2.	"Count 'Em"	Hank Bentley; Lake; Jacob Sooter	Jacob Sooter; Hank Bentley	3:47
3.	"Praise You Anywhere"	Bentley; Ben Fielding; Lake; Sooter	Jacob Sooter; Hank Bentley	3:35
4.	"Miracle Child"	Ethan Hulse; Lake; Sooter	Jacob Sooter; Hank Bentley	4:03
5.	"Tear Off the Roof"	Bentley; Jordan Colle; Chris Davenport; Lake; Sooter	Jacob Sooter; Hank Bentley	4:23
6.	"Adoption Song"	Lake; Mooring; Smith; Sooter	Jonathan Smith; Jacob Sooter	4:36
7.	"God Is Not Against Me"	Pat Barrett; Davenport; Furtick; Lake	Jacob Sooter; Hank Bentley	4:43
8.	"Kids"	Bentley; Cherry; Lake; Sooter	Hank Bentley	4:50
9.	"Nothing New"	Bentley; Cody Carnes; Mia Fieldes; Lake; Sooter	Hank Bentley; Jacob Sooter	4:29
10.	"More" (with Benjamin William Hastings)	Bentley; Benjamin Hastings; Lake; Dylan Thomas	Hank Bentley; Jacob Sooter	4:51
11.	"Palm of Your Hand"	Furtick; Jason Ingram; Lake	Micah Nichols; Jacob Sooter; Joe LaPorta	5:49
12.	"Turnaround"	Furtick; Ingram; Lake	Jacob Sooter; Hank Bentley	3:37
13.	"I Prophesy"	Barrett; Davenport; Furtick; Hastings; Lake	Hank Bentley; Jacob Sooter	7:07
14.	"Jesus Be Praised"	Bentley; Lake; Sooter	Hank Bentley; Jacob Sooter	4:10
15.	"Holy Are You Lord"	Fielding; Ingram; Lake	Hank Bentley; Jacob Sooter	3:31
16.	"Country Psalm"	Bentley; Tom Douglas; Lake; Micah Nichols; Emily Weisband	Jacob Sooter; Hank Bentley	5:05
Total length:				73:07

== Personnel ==
Adapted from AllMusic.

- Aaron Sterling – drums, engineer
- Benjamin Hastings – primary artist
- Brandon Lake – acoustic guitar, background vocals, electric guitar, keyboards, primary artist, programmer
- Buckley Miller – engineer, recorder
- Casey Moore – electric guitar
- Chris Donegan – electric guitar
- Christian Walker – choir/chorus
- Dan Mackenzie – bass
- Dave Curran – bass
- David Whitworth – drums
- Denise Carite – background vocals
- Dwan Hill – vocal engineer, vocal producer
- Elizabeth Corrente – background vocals
- Evan Hutchings – drums
- Hank Bentley – acoustic guitar, background vocals, bass, electric guitar, engineer, guitar, keyboards, producer, programmer, recorder, vocal producer
- Hope UC Gangs – keyboards, programmer
- Jacob Sooter – acoustic guitar, background vocals, bass, drums, electric guitar, engineer, keyboards, producer, programmer, recorder, vocal producer
- Jason Eskridge – background vocals, vocal engineer
- Jessie Early – background vocals
- JJ Hasulube – background vocals
- Joe LaPorta – mastering engineer, producer
- John Thomas Price – drums
- John-Paul Gentile – acoustic guitar
- Jonathan Smith – acoustic guitar, background vocals, electric guitar, engineer, keyboards, producer, programmer, vocal producer
- Kiley Phillips – background vocals
- Kimberly Thomas – choir/chorus
- Landon Wiggs – background vocals
- Leeland Mooring – background vocals, keyboards, programmer
- Luke Fredrickson – mixing engineer
- Mackenzie Lawhon – background vocals
- Mary Beth Sudduth – choir/chorus
- Matt Huber – mixing engineer
- Matthew Figueroa – background vocals
- McKayla Hill – background vocals
- Micah Nichols – acoustic guitar, bass, electric guitar, engineer, keyboards, producer, programmer, vocal producer
- Nick Rad – mixing engineer
- Olivia Scroggs – background vocals
- Peirce Lyons – background vocals
- Peter Mol – acoustic guitar, electric guitar, keyboards, programmer
- Robbie Artress – engineer
- Robert Mauti – choir/chorus
- Scottie Mills – electric guitar
- Scotty Murray – slide guitar
- Sean Moffitt – mixing engineer
- Seany Denson – choir/chorus
- Shirley Hernandez – choir/chorus
- Taylor Johnson – electric guitar
- Tim Riordan – engineer
- Tony Lucido – bass
- Wil Merrell – background vocals
- Will Burke – background vocals
- Will Chapman – drums
- William Sanford – background vocals

== Charts ==
=== Weekly ===
Weekly chart performance for Coat of Many Colors
Chart (2023)	Peak position
UK Album Downloads (Official Charts)	74
UK Christian & Gospel Albums (OCC)	9
US Billboard 200	135
US Top Christian Albums (Billboard)	1

=== Year-end ===
Year-end chart performance for Coat of Many Colors
Chart (2024)	Position
US Top Christian Albums (Billboard)	5
Chart (2025)	Position
US Top Christian Albums (Billboard)	13

== Release history ==
Release history for Coat of Many Colors
Region	Date	Format	Label	Ref.
Various	October 20, 2023	CD; digital download; streaming	Provident Label Group	
