= Battle Is the Lord's =

2020 song by Rebecca St. James featuring Brandon Lake

Single by Rebecca St. James featuring Brandon Lake

from the album Dawn and Kingdom Come
- Released: 12 June 2020
- Recorded: 2020
- Genre: Contemporary worship music
- Length: 3:55
- Label: Heritage Music Group
- Songwriter(s): Tedd Tjornhom; Heath Balltzglier; Rebecca St. James; Seth Condrey
- Producer(s): Seth Mosley; Tedd Tjornhom

Rebecca St. James singles chronology
"I Will Praise You" (2011)	"Battle Is the Lord's" (2020)	"Together (Acoustic Version)" (2020)

Brandon Lake singles chronology
"We Are the Kingdom" (2020)	"Battle Is the Lord's" (2020)	"I Need a Ghost" (2020)

Music videos
- "Battle Is the Lord's" (Acoustic) on YouTube
- "Battle Is the Lord's" (Lyrics) on YouTube

"Battle Is the Lord's" is a song performed by Australian Christian pop singer Rebecca St. James featuring American contemporary worship musician Brandon Lake. The song was released on 12 June 2020, as the lead single to her fifth extended play, Dawn (2020). It later appeared on her tenth studio album, Kingdom Come. St. James co-wrote the song with Heath Balltzglier, Seth Condrey, and Tedd Tjornhom. Seth Mosley collaborated with Tedd Tjornhom in the production of the single.

== Background ==
On 10 June 2020, Heritage Music Group announced that Rebecca St. James would be releasing her first single in nine years, titled "Battle Is the Lord's," on 12 June 2020. St. James shared the story behind the song, saying:

In working with the song over this last year on and off, it just represents to me the fact that God has gone before me with my music and with this calling. This song has ministered to me that the battle is the Lord’s and I can rest in Him. He’s fighting for me, He’s gone before me, He’s called me to this and I don’t have to fear.

== Composition ==
"Battle Is the Lord's" is composed in the key of G major with a tempo of 160 beats per minute.

== Commercial performance ==
"Battle Is the Lord's" debuted on the Christian Airplay chart dated 27 June 2020, at No. 45. The song went on to peak at No. 34 and had spent fifteen non-consecutive weeks on the chart.

"Battle Is the Lord's" debuted at No. 48 on the US Hot Christian Songs chart dated 8 August 2020.

== Music videos ==
The official lyric video for the "Battle Is the Lord's" was availed by Rebecca St. James on 15 June 2020, to YouTube. The acoustic performance video of the song was published on St. James' YouTube channel on 1 July 2020. On 24 July 2020, St. James uploaded the audio video of the song on YouTube.

== Track listing ==
"Battle Is the Lord's"
No.	Title	Length
1.	"Battle Is the Lord's" (featuring Brandon Lake)	3:55

"Battle Is the Lord's" (Live)
No.	Title	Length
1.	"Battle Is the Lord's" (featuring Brandon Lake; Live)	4:09

== Charts ==
Chart (2020)	Peak position
US Hot Christian Songs (Billboard)	48
US Christian Airplay (Billboard)	34

== Release history ==
Region	Date	Version	Format	Label	Ref.
Various	12 June 2020	EP version	Digital download; streaming	Heritage Music Group	
United States	12 June 2020	EP version	Christian radio	Heritage Music Group	
Various	28 March 2021	Live	Digital download; streaming	Heritage Music Group	
