= Brandon Lake =

American Christian musician (born 1990)

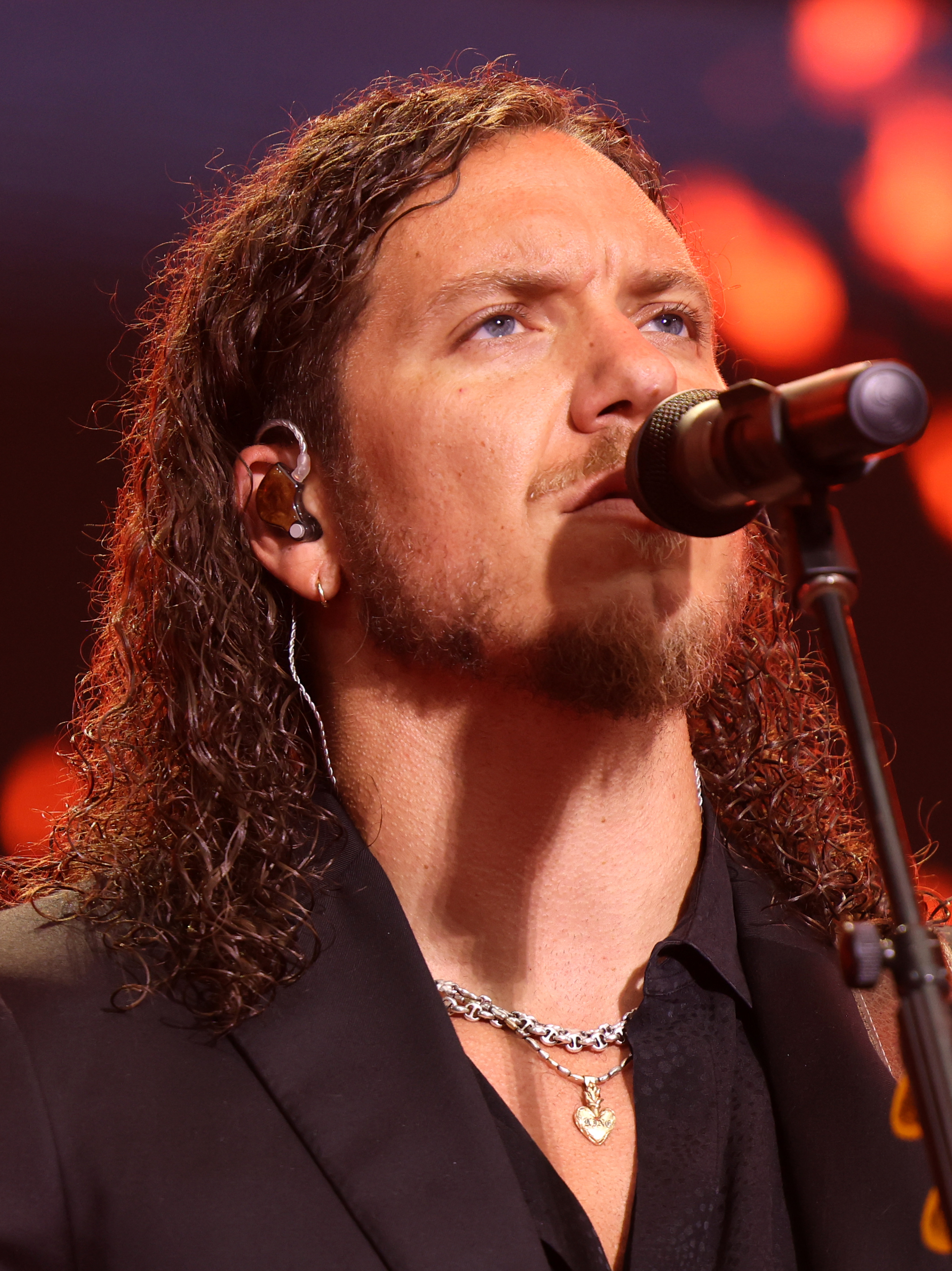
- Lake in 2025

Background information
- Born: Michael Brandon Lake; June 21, 1990 (age 36); Dallas, Texas, U.S.
- Genre: Contemporary worship music · CCM · Christian country
- Occupations: Singer; musician; songwriter
- Instruments: Vocals; guitar; piano
- Works: Brandon Lake discography
- Years active: 2015–present
- Labels: Bethel Music; Tribl; Provident
- Member of: Seacoast Music; Sons Of Sunday
- Formerly of: Bethel Music; Maverick City Music; Lifepoint Worship
- Spouse: Brittany Schneider (m. 2011)
- Website: Official website

Michael Brandon Lake (born June 21, 1990), known professionally as Brandon Lake, is an American contemporary Christian singer-songwriter and guitarist. He writes songs at Seacoast Church in Charleston, South Carolina, and is a former member of Bethel Music and Maverick City Music. Lake began his recording career in 2015 with a successful crowdfunding campaign to produce an album, which resulted in the independent release of his debut studio album, Closer, in 2016.

Lake signed with Bethel Music in January 2019, and made his debut on the record label by releasing his version of Tasha Cobbs Leonard's hit single "This Is a Move". For his contributions as a songwriter on "This Is a Move", Lake received the GMA Dove Award Gospel Worship Recorded Song of the Year in the 2019 GMA Dove Awards. "This Is a Move" also earned Lake his first Grammy Award nomination for Best Gospel Performance/Song in the 2020 Grammy Awards. In 2020, he released his second studio album House of Miracles, which contained the singles "I Need a Ghost" and "Just Like Heaven". House of Miracles peaked at number six on Billboard's Top Christian Albums chart in the United States. In 2022, Lake released Help!, his third studio album, which is about mental health. Help! debuted at number 18 on the Billboard Top Christian Albums chart in the United States. He released "Gratitude" as his third single from House of Miracles (2020), which became his first solo Hot Christian Songs number one single. He collaborated with Brooke Ligertwood on the single "Honey in the Rock" and with Maverick City Music, Kirk Franklin, and Chandler Moore on "Fear Is Not My Future". He released his fourth studio album, Coat of Many Colors, in 2023.

Lake is featured on Elevation Worship's hit single "Graves into Gardens", which became the first number one Hot Christian Songs chart single for both acts, and peaked at number two on the Bubbling Under Hot 100 chart in the United States. In 2021, he released the single "Too Good to Not Believe" with Bethel Music, as well as notable collaborations with Elevation Worship and Maverick City Music on "Talking to Jesus" and Chris Tomlin on "I See You". Lake garnered seven nominations at the 2021 GMA Dove Awards and won in two categories, Songwriter of the Year and Worship Recorded Song of the Year for "Graves into Gardens".

== Early life and education ==
Brandon Lake grew up in Myrtle Beach, South Carolina, where his father was a pastor of a church plant. He developed a passion for playing the guitar in childhood, which was nurtured by his father who taught him to play a few basic chord progressions. Lake taught himself how to play the guitar using YouTube, learning songs by Third Day and Chris Tomlin. During his teenage years, Lake accompanied the worship team at his church and was later hired by Seacoast Church as a worship leader for their college ministry.

== Career ==
=== 2015–2019: Closer and Bethel Music signing ===
On April 15, 2015, Brandon Lake launched a GoFundMe crowdfunding campaign to raise $23,000 to produce a new album. The campaign was a success, with 101 donors pledging $23,100. In 2016, he made his career debut with the release of "Run to You", the lead single to his debut album, Closer. He independently released Closer on May 20, 2016. In 2018, he released "Pour Me Out" as a standalone single.

In January 2019, Bethel Music announced that Lake had joined their artist collective and that they had signed him to their record label. He led worship with Bethel Music on their Victory Tour, which featured special guests Tasha Cobbs Leonard and Housefires. On June 28, 2019, Lake released his rendition of Tasha Cobbs Leonard's song "This Is a Move", which he co-wrote with her. The song was released as a standalone single. "This Is a Move" was Lake's first charting single, debuting at number 36 on Billboard's Hot Christian Songs chart. Lake received a 2019 GMA Dove Award for Gospel Worship Recorded Song of the Year due to his songwriting contribution on "This Is a Move" by Cobbs Leonard. "This Is a Move" also received a songwriting nomination at the 2020 Grammy Awards in the Best Gospel Performance/Song category for Lake.

=== 2020–2022: House of Miracles and Help! ===
In early 2020, Lake was featured on several singles. The first collaboration single was Matt Redman's "We Praise You", released on January 11, 2020. On March 6, 2020, Bethel Music released a live rendition of "We Praise You" with Lake as the second single to Bethel's album Revival's in the Air (2020). This was shortly followed by Lake's feature on Elevation Worship's "Graves into Gardens" released on March 13. "Graves into Gardens" debuted at number twelve on the Billboard Hot Christian Songs chart. It went on to peak at number one on the Hot Christian Songs chart, becoming Lake's first chart-topping hit single. "Graves into Gardens" won the Billboard Music Award for Top Christian Song at the 2021 Billboard Music Awards.

On May 25, 2020, Bethel Music released the song "Come Out of that Grave (Resurrection Power)" with Lake as a promotional single. "Come Out of that Grave (Resurrection Power)" peaked at number 38 on the Billboard Hot Christian Songs chart. On June 12, 2020, he was featured on Rebecca St. James' single "Battle Is the Lord's". "Battle Is the Lord's" went on to debut at number 48 on the Billboard Hot Christian Songs chart.

On July 24, 2020, Lake released a new single titled "I Need a Ghost", as the lead single to his second studio album, House of Miracles, slated to be released in summer. "I Need a Ghost" debuted at number five on the Billboard Christian Digital Song Sales Chart. On August 14, 2020, Lake released "Just Like Heaven" as the second single from House of Miracles. "Just Like Heaven" peaked at number 36 on the Billboard Hot Christian Songs chart. On August 17, 2020, Lake announced that the album was slated for release on August 28. The album was released on August 28, 2020, containing the singles "I Need a Ghost" and "Just Like Heaven". The album peaked at number six on Billboard's Top Christian Albums chart.

On January 22, 2021, Lake released his first live album, House of Miracles (Live), which contains live versions of some of the songs that initially appeared on House of Miracles studio album, as well as new songs. The album debuted at number 29 on the Top Christian Albums Chart. On February 6, 2021, Lake released a five-track EP titled Almond Eyes on digital platforms, the EP being his surprise tenth anniversary gift to his wife, Brittany Lake. Lake featured on "Talking to Jesus" by Elevation Worship and Maverick City Music, which was released as the second promotional single to their collaborative live album, Old Church Basement (2021), on April 9, 2021. "Talking to Jesus" debuted at number nine on the US Hot Christian Songs chart and at number one on the Hot Gospel Songs chart, both dated April 22, 2021. Lake and Bethel Music released the song "Too Good to Not Believe" as a single on May 21, 2021. "Too Good to Not Believe" peaked at number 17 on the Billboard Hot Christian Songs chart. On August 6, 2021, Lake and Chris Tomlin released the song "I See You" as a single. "I See You" peaked at number 31 on the Billboard Hot Christian Songs chart.

Lake received seven nominations for the 2021 GMA Dove Awards in October, in categories such as New Artist of the Year, Songwriter of the Year, Rock/Contemporary Recorded Song of the Year for "I Need a Ghost," Song of the Year and Worship Recorded Song of the Year for his feature on "Graves into Gardens", and Long Form Video of the Year for House of Miracles (Live), and he won the GMA Dove Award for the Songwriter of the Year and Worship Recorded Song of the Year for "Graves into Gardens". His 2020 song "Gratitude" featured in the 2021 Christmas special of Christian television series The Chosen, as a performance specifically for the special.

On March 25, 2022, Lake and Brooke Ligertwood released "Honey in the Rock" as a single to Christian radio in the United States. "Honey in the Rock" peaked at number seven on the Billboard Hot Christian Songs chart. On April 11, 2022, Brandon Lake announced his first headlining tour, dubbed the Miracle Nights Tour, joined by Blessing Offor and Joshua Silverberg as special guests and set to visit twelve cities in the United States during the fall of 2022. On May 13, 2022, Brandon Lake released his third studio album, Help!, via Tribl Records. Help! is a concept album centered on mental health. Help! debuted at number 18 on the Top Christian Albums Chart. Lake released the radio version of "Gratitude" on June 3, 2022, making it the third and final single from House of Miracles (2020). "Gratitude" peaked at number one on the Hot Christian Songs chart, marking his first number one single on the chart as a lead artist.

Lake received five nominations at the 2022 GMA Dove Awards, being nominated for Songwriter of the Year – Artist, songwriting nominations in the Song of the Year category for "Rattle!" by Elevation Worship and Rock/Contemporary Recorded Song of the Year category for "I Need You" by Gable Price and Friends, as well as producer nominations in the Contemporary Gospel Album of the Year and Christmas/Special Event Album of the Year categories for Maverick City Music albums Jubilee: Juneteenth Edition (2021) and A Very Maverick Christmas (2021), respectively.

On October 28, 2022, Lake and KB released "Graves" as a single. "Graves" peaked at number 33 on the Billboard Hot Christian Songs chart. On November 4, 2022, Lake featured on the radio version of "Fear Is Not My Future" released by Maverick City Music and Chandler Moore. "Fear Is Not My Future" peaked at number 13 on the Billboard Hot Christian Songs chart. On November 14, 2022, Lake announced the spring 2023 leg of the Miracle Nights Tour, with Benjamin William Hastings joining him as a special guest, spanning twelve cities across the United States.

=== 2023–2024: Coat of Many Colors and Tear Off the Roof (Live from the Holy City) ===
In early 2023, Brandon Lake and Phil Wickham announced they were embarking on the Summer Worship Nights Tour. The tour would span twelve cities across the United States in August 2023. Christian rapper KB also joined them as a special guest. On April 11, 2023, Lake alongside Chris Davenport and Cody Carnes released "Plead the Blood" as a single. On April 12, 2023, Provident Entertainment announced they had signed Lake to their artist roster, and in the same month he also joined talent agency Endeavor (formerly WME).

On June 9, 2023, Lake released "Praise You Anywhere" as the lead single to his fourth studio album, Coat of Many Colors, along with its accompanying music video. "Praise You Anywhere" debuted at number three on the Billboard Hot Christian Songs chart. On July 28, 2023, Lake and Phil Wickham released "People of Heaven" as a standalone single dedicated to closing their Summer Worship Nights Tour. "People of Heaven" debuted at number 40 on the Hot Christian Songs chart. On July 31, 2023, Lake announced he would embark on the Coat of Many Colors Tour in support of his album of the same name. The tour commenced in late fall and early winter and featured Benjamin William Hastings as his special guest. On August 4, 2023, Lake released "Count 'Em" as the second single from Coat of Many Colors, along with its accompanying music video. "Count 'Em" peaked at number 19 on the Billboard Hot Christian Songs chart.

Lake released "Coat of Many Colors" as the first promotional single from the album, along with its accompanying music video, on September 8, 2023. "Coat of Many Colors" peaked at number 20 on the Billboard Hot Christian Songs chart. On October 6, 2023, Lake released "Tear Off the Roof" as the second promotional single from Coat of Many Colors, along with its accompanying music video, which features the cast and characters of The Chosen. "Tear Off the Roof" peaked at number 27 on the Billboard Hot Christian Songs chart.

On October 20, 2023, Lake released his fourth studio album, Coat of Many Colors. The album sold 9,000 equivalent album units in its first week and debuted at number one on the Top Christian Albums chart dated November 4, 2023, becoming Lake's first number one entry on the chart. Coat of Many Colors debuted at number 135 on the Billboard 200, becoming Lake's first entry on the chart. "Praise You Anywhere" reached number one on Hot Christian Songs that same week.

Lake received eleven nominations at the 2023 GMA Dove Awards, being nominated for Artist of the Year and three Song of the Year nominations for co-writing "Fear Is Not My Future," "Gratitude," and "Same God." At the ceremony, Lake won the most receiving four awards for Artist of the Year, Songwriter of the Year – Artist, Worship Recorded Song of the Year for "Gratitude," and Rap/Hip Hop Recorded Song of the Year for "Graves". At the 2023 Billboard Music Awards, Lake garnered four nominations: Top Christian Artist, Top Christian Album for House of Miracles (2020), Top Christian Song for "Gratitude," and Top Gospel Song for "Fear Is Not My Future" alongside Maverick City Music, Kirk Franklin, and Chandler Moore. Lake was declared by Billboard to be the leading artist in the Top Christian Artist - Male category of 2023, with "Gratitude" being the top song of 2023 on the Hot Christian Songs chart.

On November 20, 2023, Lake announced he would embark on the Tear Off the Roof Tour in the spring of 2024, with Doe featuring as a special guest. The ongoing tour spans twenty cities across the United States which began in Birmingham, Alabama, on March 7, 2024, and will conclude in Charleston, South Carolina, on May 5, 2024. On February 5, 2024, Brandon Lake released "Nothing New (I Do) – Wedding Version" featuring Brittany Lake as a standalone single. "Nothing New" peaked at number 28 on the Billboard Hot Christian Songs chart. On March 1, 2024, Lake featured on Elevation Worship's single "Praise" alongside Chris Brown and Chandler Moore. "Praise" reached number one on the Billboard Hot Christian Songs chart dated March 16, 2024 and was for a total of 31 weeks. In March 2024, Lake and Wickham have announced a second Summer Worship Nights tour, which will take place in August. "Miracle Child" was released as the third single from Coat of Many Colors on March 22, 2024. "Miracle Child" peaked at number 20 on the US Hot Christian Songs chart.

On June 13, 2024, Lake announced that he will release a new album, Tear Off the Roof (Live from the Holy City), on June 21. Tear Off the Roof (Live from the Holy City) was released on June 21, 2024. The album debuted at number 18 on Billboard's Top Christian Albums chart. Lake and Phil Wickham released "Love of God" as a standalone single ahead of the Summer Worship Nights, on June 28, 2024. "Love of God" peaked at number 20 on the Billboard Hot Christian Songs chart.

=== 2024–present: King of Hearts album & Tour ===
On July 29, 2024, Brandon Lake released "That's Who I Praise" as a single. "That's Who I Praise" reached number one on the Hot Christian Songs chart dated October 19, 2024. and spent a total of 9 weeks at number 1. On November 8, 2024, Lake released "Hard Fought Hallelujah". With 7 million US streams and 13,000 US sales, the single debuted at number 51 on the Billboard Hot 100, number one on the Digital Songs chart, and number one on the Hot Christian Songs chart where it has spent a total of 47 weeks at number 1 as of March 2026. Lake and Elevation Worship released a single, "I Know a Name", on February 14, 2025 and Lake released "Sevens" on May 15, 2025. His Album, King of Hearts, was released on June 13, 2025 and charted at No. 7 on the Billboard 200. He also announced the King of Hearts Tour running from 2025 until 2026.

On September 21, 2025, Lake led worship at the memorial service of Charlie Kirk held at State Farm Stadium in Phoenix, Arizona. The assassination of Charlie Kirk occurred in Utah on September 10, 2025.

== Personal life ==
Lake and Brittany Ann Schneider married on February 5, 2011, in Mount Pleasant, South Carolina. They have three sons, Blaise, Beau, and Banner.

In 2024, Lake talked about his struggle with depression.

== Discography ==
- Closer (2016)
- House of Miracles (2020)
- Help! (2022)
- Coat of Many Colors (2023)
- King of Hearts (2025)

== Filmography ==
Title	Year	Role	Notes	Ref.
Christmas with the Chosen: The Messengers	2021	Self	Performed "Gratitude" on the set of The Chosen.	
For the One	2024	Self		

== Tours ==
Headlining

- Singalong Tour with Phil Wickham and Pat Barrett (2021)
- Miracle Nights Tour (2022–23)
- Summer Worship Nights Tour with Phil Wickham (2023–2025)
- Coat of Many Colors Tour (2023)
- Tear Off the Roof Tour (2024)
- King of Hearts Tour (2025–2026)

Supporting

- Victory Tour with Bethel Music (2019)
- Chris Tomlin, Kari Jobe, Bethel Music Live in Concert (2021)
- Elevation Nights Tour with Elevation Worship and Steven Furtick (2022)
- Kingdom Tour with Maverick City Music and Kirk Franklin (2022)
- The Kaleidoscope Tour with Lauren Daigle (2023)

== Awards and nominations ==
=== ASCAP Christian Music Awards ===
Year	Nominee / work	Award	Result	Ref.
2021	"Graves into Gardens"	Most Performed ASCAP Christian Songs of 2020	Won	
2022	"Rattle!"	Most Performed ASCAP Christian Songs of 2021	Won	
2023	Brandon Lake	Songwriter of the Year	Won	
2023	"Ain't Nobody"	Most Performed ASCAP Christian Songs of 2022	Won	
2023	"Gratitude"	Most Performed ASCAP Christian Songs of 2022	Won	
2023	"Honey in the Rock"	Most Performed ASCAP Christian Songs of 2022	Won	
2023	"Same God"	Most Performed ASCAP Christian Songs of 2022	Won	
2023	"This Is Our God"	Most Performed ASCAP Christian Songs of 2022	Won	
2024	Brandon Lake	Songwriter/Artist of the Year	Won	
2024	"Fear Is Not My Future"	Most Performed ASCAP Christian Songs of 2023	Won	
2024	"Praise"	Most Performed ASCAP Christian Songs of 2023	Won	
2024	"Praise You Anywhere"	Most Performed ASCAP Christian Songs of 2023	Won	
2024	"Trust in God"	Most Performed ASCAP Christian Songs of 2023	Won	

=== Billboard Music Awards ===
Year	Nominee / work	Award	Result	Ref.
2021	"Graves into Gardens" (Elevation Worship featuring Brandon Lake)	Top Christian Song	Won	
2023	Brandon Lake	Top Christian Artist	Nominated	
2023	House of Miracles	Top Christian Album	Nominated	
2023	"Gratitude"	Top Christian Song	Won	
2023	"Fear Is Not My Future" (Maverick City Music and Kirk Franklin featuring Brandon Lake and Chandler Moore)	Top Gospel Song	Nominated	
2024	Brandon Lake	Top Christian Artist	Nominated	
2024	Coat of Many Colors	Top Christian Album	Nominated	
2024	"Praise" (Elevation Worship featuring Brandon Lake, Chris Brown and Chandler Moore)	Top Christian Song	Won	

=== CMA Awards ===
Year	Nominee / work	Award	Result	Ref.
2025	"Hard Fought Hallelujah"	Musical Event of the Year	Nominated	

=== GMA Dove Awards ===
Year	Nominee / work	Award	Result	Ref.
2019	"This Is a Move (Live)" (Note: Lake is credited as a co-writer of "This Is a Move (Live)" performed by Tasha Cobbs Leonard.) (Tasha Cobbs Leonard)	Gospel Worship Recorded Song of the Year	Won	
2021	Brandon Lake	Songwriter of the Year	Won	
2021	Brandon Lake	New Artist of the Year	Nominated	
2021	"Graves into Gardens" (Elevation Worship featuring Brandon Lake)	Song of the Year	Nominated	
2021	"Graves into Gardens" (Elevation Worship featuring Brandon Lake)	Worship Recorded Song of the Year	Won	
2021	"I Need a Ghost"	Rock/Contemporary Recorded Song of the Year	Nominated	
2021	"Tumbas A Jardines" (Elevation Worship featuring Brandon Lake)	Spanish Language Recorded Song of the Year	Nominated	
2021	House of Miracles (Live)	Long Form Video of the Year	Nominated	
2022	Brandon Lake	Songwriter of the Year - Artist	Nominated	
2022	"Rattle!" (Note: Lake was credited as a co-writer on "Rattle!" by Elevation Worship.) (Elevation Worship)	Song of the Year	Nominated	
2022	"I Need You" (Note: Lake was credited as a co-writer on "I Need You" by Gable Price and Friends.) (Gable Price and Friends)	Rock/Contemporary Recorded Song of the Year of the Year	Nominated	
2022	Jubilee: Juneteenth Edition (Note: Lake was credited as a producer on Jubilee: Juneteenth Edition by Maverick City Music.) (Maverick City Music)	Contemporary Gospel Album of the Year	Nominated	
2022	A Very Maverick Christmas (Note: Lake was credited as a producer on A Very Maverick Christmas by Maverick City Music.) (Maverick City Music)	Christmas/Special Event Album of the Year	Nominated	
2023	Brandon Lake	Artist of the Year	Won	
2023	Brandon Lake	Songwriter of the Year - Artist	Won	
2023	"Fear Is Not My Future" (Note: Lake was credited as a co-writer on "Fear Is Not My Future" by Maverick City Music.) (Maverick City Music featuring Brandon Lake and Chandler Moore)	Song of the Year	Nominated	
2023	"Fear Is Not My Future" (Maverick City Music featuring Brandon Lake and Chandler Moore)	Worship Recorded Song of the Year	Nominated	
2023	"Gratitude"	Song of the Year	Nominated	
2023	"Gratitude"	Worship Recorded Song of the Year	Won	
2023	"Same God" (Note: Lake was credited as a co-writer on "Same God" by Elevation Worship.) (Elevation Worship)	Song of the Year	Nominated	
2023	"Honey in the Rock" (Brooke Ligertwood and Brandon Lake)	Worship Recorded Song of the Year	Nominated	
2023	"This Is Our God" (Note: Lake was credited as a co-writer on "This Is Our God" by Phil Wickham.) (Phil Wickham)	Worship Recorded Song of the Year	Nominated	
2023	"Graves" (KB and Brandon Lake)	Rap/Hip Hop Recorded Song of the Year	Won	
2023	"Graves" (KB and Brandon Lake)	Short Form Music Video of the Year (Performance)	Nominated	
2024	Brandon Lake	Artist of the Year	Nominated	
2024	Brandon Lake	Songwriter of the Year - Artist	Won	
2024	"Praise" (Note: Lake was credited as a co-writer on "Praise" by Elevation Worship.) (Elevation Worship featuring Brandon Lake, Chris Brown, Chandler Moore)	Song of the Year	Nominated	
2024	"Praise" (Elevation Worship featuring Brandon Lake, Chris Brown, Chandler Moore)	Worship Recorded Song of the Year	Won	
2024	"Praise You Anywhere"	Song of the Year	Nominated	
2024	"Praise You Anywhere"	Worship Recorded Song of the Year	Nominated	
2024	"This Is Our God" (Phil Wickham)	Song of the Year	Nominated	
2024	"Trust in God" (Note: Lake was credited as a co-writer on "Trust in God" by Elevation Worship.) (Elevation Worship featuring Chris Brown)	Song of the Year	Nominated	
2024	"Trust in God" (Elevation Worship featuring Chris Brown)	Worship Recorded Song of the Year	Nominated	
2024	"Miracles" (Note: Lake was credited as a co-writer on "Miracles" by KB and Lecrae.) (KB, Lecrae)	Rap/Hip Hop Recorded Song of the Year	Nominated	
2024	"Count 'Em"	Rock/Contemporary Recorded Song of the Year	Nominated	
2024	"Count 'Em"	Short Form Music Video of the Year (Concept)	Nominated	
2024	"Alaba" (Note: Lake was credited as a co-writer on "Alaba" by Elevation Worship.) (Elevation Worship, Elevation Espanol, Unified Sound)	Spanish Language Worship Recorded Song of the Year	Nominated	
2024	Coat of Many Colors	Pop/Contemporary Album of the Year	Won	
2024	Coat of Many Colors	Recorded Music Packaging of the Year	Nominated	
2024	"Coat of Many Colors"	Short Form Music Video of the Year (Performance)	Nominated	
2025	"Hard Fought Hallelujah"	Song of the Year	Won	
2025	"Hard Fought Hallelujah"	Short Form Music Video of the Year	Won	
2025	"Hard Fought Hallelujah"	Bluegrass/Country/Roots Recorded Song of the Year	Won	
2025	"That's Who I Praise"	Song of the Year	Won	
2025	"I Know a Name"	Worship Recorded Song of the Year	Won	
2026	"Can't Steal My Joy"	Song of the Year	Nominated	
2026	"I Know a Name"	Song of the Year	Nominated	
2026	Brandon Lake	Songwriter of the Year	Won	
2026	Brandon Lake	Artist of the Year	Nominated	
2026	"Sevens"	Rock/Contemporary Recorded Song of the Year	Nominated	
2026	"Sevens"	Short Form Music Video of the Year (Concept)	Nominated	
2026	"The Jesus I Know Now"	Country/Roots Recorded Song of the Year	Won	
2026	King of Hearts	Pop/Contemporary Album of the Year	Won	

=== Grammy Awards ===
Year	Nominee / work	Award	Result	Ref.
2020	"This Is a Move (Live)" (Tasha Cobbs Leonard)	Best Gospel Performance/Song	Nominated	
2022	"Wait on You" (Note: Lake is credited as a member of Maverick City Music.) (Elevation Worship and Maverick City Music)	Best Gospel Performance/Song	Nominated	
2022	"Jireh" (Elevation Worship and Maverick City Music featuring Chandler Moore and Naomi Raine)	Best Contemporary Christian Music Performance/Song	Nominated	
2022	Jubilee: Juneteenth Edition (Maverick City Music)	Best Gospel Album	Nominated	
2022	Old Church Basement (Elevation Worship and Maverick City Music)	Best Contemporary Christian Music Album	Won	
2023	"Kingdom" (Maverick City Music and Kirk Franklin)	Best Gospel Performance/Song	Won	
2023	"Fear Is Not My Future" (Maverick City Music and Kirk Franklin)	Best Contemporary Christian Music Performance/Song	Won	
2023	"God Really Loves Us (Radio Version)" (Crowder featuring Dante Bowe and Maverick City Music)	Best Contemporary Christian Music Performance/Song	Nominated	
2023	Kingdom Book One Deluxe (Maverick City Music and Kirk Franklin)	Best Gospel Album	Won	
2023	Breathe (Maverick City Music)	Best Contemporary Christian Music Album	Won	
2025	"Praise" (Elevation Worship featuring Brandon Lake, Chris Brown and Chandler Moore)	Best Contemporary Christian Music Performance/Song	Nominated	
2025	Coat of Many Colors	Best Contemporary Christian Music Album	Nominated	
2026	King of Hearts	Best Contemporary Christian Music Album	Nominated	
2026	"I Know a Name"	Best Contemporary Christian Music Performance/Song	Nominated	
2026	"Hard Fought Hallelujah"	Best Contemporary Christian Music Performance/Song	Won	
2027	"The Jesus I Know Now"	Best Contemporary Christian Music Performance/Song	Pending	
2027	King of Hearts - In the Room	Best Contemporary Christian Music Album	Pending	

=== We Love Awards ===
Year	Nominee / work	Category	Result	Ref.
2025	"Hard Fought Hallelujah"	Song of the Year	Nominated	
2025	"Hard Fought Hallelujah"	Contemporary Song of the Year	Nominated	
2025	"Hard Fought Hallelujah"	Mainstream Impact Award	Won	
2025	"Can't Steal My Joy"	Collaboration of the Year	Nominated	
2025	"Sevens"	Music Video of the Year	Nominated	

== See also ==
- List of Christian worship music artists
