= Count 'Em =

2023 song by Brandon Lake

Single by Brandon Lake

from the album Coat of Many Colors
- Released: August 4, 2023
- Genre: Christian rock
- Length: 3:47
- Label: Provident Label Group
- Songwriters: Brandon Lake; Jacob Sooter; Hank Bentley
- Producers: Jacob Sooter; Hank Bentley

Brandon Lake singles chronology
"People of Heaven" (2023)	"Count 'Em" (2023)	"Nothing New (I Do)" (2024)

Music videos
- "Count 'Em" on YouTube
- "Count 'Em" (Lyrics) on YouTube
- "Count 'Em" (Live from Summer Worship Nights) on YouTube

"Count 'Em" is a song by Brandon Lake. The song was released on August 4, 2023, as the second single from his fourth studio album, Coat of Many Colors (2023). Lake co-wrote the song with Hank Bentley and Jacob Sooter. Jacob Sooter and Hank Bentley worked on the production of the single.

The song peaked at number 19 on the US Hot Christian Songs chart published by Billboard.

== Background ==
On July 31, 2023, Lake announced that he will embark on the Coat of Many Colors Tour in the fall of 2023, and that "Count 'Em" will be released on August 4, 2023. "Count 'Em" was released as the second single from the album, along with its accompanying music video, on August 4, 2023.

== Writing and development ==
Lake shared the story behind the song in an interview with American Songwriter, saying:

"I was at Hank Bentley’s house with Jacob Sooter working on the record when we decided to take a break and head out for lunch. Jacob struck a few chords on the Wurlitzer as we’re heading out the door. I quickly was inspired and rattled off a verse idea with a fast cadence. I didn’t think much of it but as we got back from lunch I couldn’t shake the desire to want to write whatever song this would become. A few hours later we had this monster of a song that brags on who God is and all the things I’ve seen Him do. I’m grateful for those heavenly interruptions that inspire a song when you least expect it."

== Composition ==
"Count 'Em" is a rock song containing hip-hop influence and gospel choir background vocals. The song is composed in the key of C or C minor with a tempo of 70 beats per minute and a musical time signature of 4/4.

== Reception ==
=== Critical response ===
Writing for Air1, Lindsay Williams opined on the song: "With dark undertones of synth-heavy pop and a rapid-fire, hip-hop inflected delivery, "Count 'Em" is a lyrically rich single that doesn't fit the typical worship mold, yet holds a high reverence for the fear of God." Reviewing for Jesus Freak Hideout, Matthew Spiker said ""Count 'Em" is easily the heaviest song on the album and has one of the best hooks." Lindsay Williams in her K-Love review wrote: "The fiery track is full of dark, moody production and a spitfire spoken-word delivery, swiftly proving Lake's music can't be categorized, nor can it be pegged as anything other than unpredictable. But that's precisely what makes him so compelling as an artist." In a NewReleaseToday review, Jasmin Patterson said of the song: "The grit and edge in this one fit the subject matter of how powerful and victorious God is. "

=== Awards and nominations ===
Awards
Year	Organization	Award	Result	Ref
2024	GMA Dove Awards	Rock/Contemporary Recorded Song of the Year	Nominated	
2024	GMA Dove Awards	Short Form Music Video of the Year (Concept)	Nominated	

== Commercial performance ==
"Count 'Em" debuted at number 27 on the US Hot Christian Songs chart dated August 19, 2023, concurrently charting at number six on the Christian Digital Song Sales chart, and number 21 on the Rock Digital Song Sales chart. The song peaked at number 19 on the US Hot Christian Songs chart dated December 16, 2023,

== Music videos ==
Brandon Lake released the official music video of "Count 'Em" through his YouTube channel on August 4, 2023. Lake also released the lyric video for the song via YouTube on the same day. On January 19, 2024, Lake released the live performance video of the song recorded during the Summer Worship Nights Tour on YouTube.

== Track listing ==
Count 'Em
No.	Title	Writer(s)	Producer(s)	Length
1.	"Count 'Em"	Hank Bentley; Brandon Lake; Jacob Sooter	Jacob Sooter; Hank Bentley	3:47
2.	"Praise You Anywhere"	Bentley; Ben Fielding; Lake; Sooter	Jacob Sooter; Hank Bentley	3:35
Total length:				7:23

== Charts ==
=== Weekly charts ===
Weekly chart performance for "Count 'Em"
Chart (2023–2024)	Peak position
US Hot Christian Songs (Billboard)	19
US Christian Airplay (Billboard)	21
US Christian AC (Billboard)	26
US Rock Digital Song Sales (Billboard)	21

=== Year-end charts ===
Year-end chart performance for "Count 'Em"
Chart (2023)	Position
US Christian Songs (Billboard)	98

== Certifications ==
Region	Certification	Certified units/sales
United States (RIAA)	Gold	500,000^{‡}
^{‡} Sales+streaming figures based on certification alone.

== Release history ==
Release history for "Count 'Em"
Region	Date	Format	Label	Ref.
Various	August 4, 2023	Digital download; streaming	Provident Label Group	
