= Praise You Anywhere =

2023 song by Brandon Lake

Single by Brandon Lake

from the album Coat of Many Colors
- Released: June 9, 2023
- Genre: Contemporary worship music
- Length: 3:35
- Label: Provident Label Group
- Songwriters: Brandon Lake; Ben Fielding; Jacob Sooter; Hank Bentley
- Producers: Jacob Sooter; Hank Bentley

Brandon Lake singles chronology
"Talking to Jesus" (2023)	"Praise You Anywhere" (2023)	"People of Heaven" (2023)

Music videos
- "Praise You Anywhere" on YouTube
- "Praise You Anywhere" (Lyrics) on YouTube
- "Praise You Anywhere" (Song Session) on YouTube

"Praise You Anywhere" is a song by Brandon Lake. The song was released on June 9, 2023, as the lead single from his fourth studio album, Coat of Many Colors (2023). Lake co-wrote the song with Ben Fielding, Hank Bentley, and Jacob Sooter. Jacob Sooter and Hank Bentley worked on the production of the single.

The song peaked at number one on the US Hot Christian Songs chart published by Billboard.

== Background ==
On June 9, 2023, Lake released "Praise You Anywhere" as the lead single to his upcoming studio album slated for release in fall. Lake shared the story behind the song, saying: "This song is about turning to praise in and out of every season. There are times when we're surrounded by storms and times when we're living in immense blessing… We light God's heart up when we simply praise no matter what we're facing. Your situation might not change, but choosing to praise will change your perspective. This will get your eyes off a storm and onto God. I hope as you listen to this song and choose to praise, you're encouraged, and your faith is lifted."

== Composition ==
"Praise You Anywhere" is composed in the key of B with a tempo of 108 beats per minute and a musical time signature of 4/4.

== Reception ==
=== Critical response ===
Jasmin Patterson of 89.5 KTSY opined that "Praise You Anywhere" isn't only a fun praise song to sing at the top of your lungs; it has a powerful message too. This song shows us that God isn't only worthy of our praise when things are going well in our lives. God is worthy of our praise anytime, anywhere, in any season. In this song, Brandon Lake sings about praising God in the fire, in the valley, in the lion's den, in the prison. He uses this imagery, pulled from actual biblical stories, to describe praising God in trials and challenging situations."

=== Accolades ===
Awards
Year	Organization	Award	Result	Ref
2024	ASCAP Christian Music Awards	Most Performed ASCAP Christian Songs of 2023	Won	
2024	GMA Dove Awards	Song of the Year	Nominated	
2024	GMA Dove Awards	Worship Recorded Song of the Year	Nominated	

Year-end lists
Publication	Accolade	Rank	Ref.
Louder Than The Music	LTTM Single Awards 2023	6	

== Commercial performance ==
"Praise You Anywhere" debuted at number 38 on the US Christian Airplay chart dated June 17, 2023. "Praise You Anywhere" debuted at number three on the US Hot Christian Songs chart dated June 24, 2023, concurrently charting at number two on the Christian Digital Song Sales chart.

The song reached number one on the Hot Christian Songs chart dated November 4, 2023, with significant gains in airplay and streaming following the release of Coat of Many Colors. "Praise You Anywhere" is Lake's third Hot Christian Songs chart-topping single in his career and he became the only artist to have reach number one on the chart with multiple singles in 2023, as "Gratitude" had reached number one on Hot Christian Songs in February.

== Music videos ==
Brandon Lake released the official music video of "Praise You Anywhere" through their YouTube channel on June 9, 2023. Lake also released the lyric video for the song via YouTube on the same day, with Essential Worship also publishing the official acoustic performance video of the song, being performed by Brandon Lake, on YouTube.

== Charts ==
=== Weekly charts ===
Weekly chart performance for "Praise You Anywhere"
Chart (2023–2024)	Peak position
US Hot Christian Songs (Billboard)	1
US Christian Airplay (Billboard)	2
US Christian AC (Billboard)	2
US Digital Song Sales (Billboard)	38

=== Year-end charts ===
Year-end chart performance for "Praise You Anywhere"
Chart (2023)	Position
US Christian Songs (Billboard)	17
US Christian Airplay (Billboard)	26
US Christian AC (Billboard)	23

== Certifications ==
Region	Certification	Certified units/sales
United States (RIAA)	Gold	500,000^{‡}
^{‡} Sales+streaming figures based on certification alone.

== Release history ==
Release history for "Praise You Anywhere"
Region	Date	Format	Label	Ref.
Various	June 9, 2023	Digital download; streaming	Provident Label Group	
