= Provident Label Group =

Division of Sony Music

Provident Entertainment
- Parent company: Sony Music Entertainment (SME)
- Founded: 1997; 29 years ago
- Genre: Contemporary Christian music
- Country of origin: United States
- Location: Franklin, Tennessee
- Official website: ProvidentLabelGroup.com

Provident Entertainment is a division of Sony Music Entertainment headquartered in Franklin, Tennessee and focused primarily on Christian music. The group handles its own physical distribution through its Provident-Integrity service.

== Provident Label Group ==
Current labels

- Essential Records
- Essential Worship
- Flicker Records
- iShine Records
- Reunion Records
- Beach Street Records
- Praise Hymn Soundtracks

Former labels

- Brentwood Records
- Benson Records
- Fervent Records
- Diadem Music Group
- Provident Special Markets

== Provident-Integrity distribution ==
In addition to its own labels, the distribution arm of Provident provides Christian-market distribution to these labels:

- 7Spin Music
- Arista Records
- BMG Classics (now Sony Masterworks)
- Boneyard Records (official label of T-Bone (rapper))
- Comin Atcha Distribution
- Creative Trust Workshop
- Cross Movement Records
- Galilee of the Nations
- GospoCentric Records/B-Rite Music
- Gray Matters
- INO Records
- Integrity Gospel
- Integrity Media
- New Haven Records
- RCA Records/RCA Inspiration
- Save the City Records
- Track Star Records
- Verity Records
- Wind-up Records

== Provident Films ==
Provident Films is a division of Provident Entertainment. They have promoted notable films including Facing the Giants (2006), Courageous (2011), and Ring the Bell (2014).

== See also ==
- Sony Music Entertainment
- List of record labels
- List of Christian record labels
