= Peace Be Still =

Peace Be Still may refer to:

- Peace Be Still (Hope Darst album), 2020
  - "Peace Be Still" (song), a 2020 single by Hope Darst
- Peace Be Still (James Cleveland album), 1963
- Peace Be Still (Vanessa Bell Armstrong album), 1983
