= Famous For (I Believe) =

2020 song by Tauren Wells

Single by Tauren Wells featuring Jenn Johnson

from the album Citizen of Heaven
- Released: January 10, 2020
- Recorded: 2019
- Studio: The Studio, Franklin, Tennessee
- Genre: Contemporary worship; CCM
- Length: 4:02
- Label: Provident Label Group
- Songwriters: Chuck Butler; Krissy Nordhoff; Jordan Sapp; Alexis Slifer; Tauren Wells
- Producers: Chuck Butler; Jordan Sapp

Tauren Wells singles chronology
"Like You Love Me" (2019)	"Famous For (I Believe)" (2020)	"Until Grace" (2020)

Jenn Johnson singles chronology
"Goodness of God" (2019)	"Famous For (I Believe)" (2020)	"God of Revival" (2020)

Music videos
- "Famous For (I Believe)" (Acoustic) on YouTube
- "Famous For (I Believe) / Do It Again" (Live) on YouTube
- "Famous For (I Believe)" (Lyrics) on YouTube

"Famous For (I Believe)" is a song by American Christian pop artist Tauren Wells featuring Jenn Johnson. It was released on January 10, 2020, as the second single from his sophomore studio album, Citizen of Heaven (2020). Wells co-wrote the song with Alexis Slifer, Chuck Butler, Jordan Sapp, and Krissy Nordhoff. Chuck Butler collaborated with Jordan Sapp on producing the single.

"Famous For (I Believe)" peaked at No. 3 on the US Hot Christian Songs chart, registering as Wells' sixth and Johnson's first top ten single. The song also went on to peak at No. 15 on the Bubbling Under Hot 100 chart, thus becoming the highest-charting single for both acts. "Famous For (I Believe)" has garnered a Grammy Award nomination for Best Contemporary Christian Music Performance/Song at the 2021 Grammy Awards. "Famous For (I Believe)" received nominations for the GMA Dove Award Song of the Year and Pop/Contemporary Recorded Song of the Year at the 2021 GMA Dove Awards.

== Background ==
In April 2020, Tauren Wells shared the story behind the song in a worship service at Christian Life Austin, saying:

There's always this saying, 'Don't meet your heroes,' because so often the people that we look up to and we characterize in a certain way, only let us down. But I'm so glad to know that I've heard some things about Jesus. There is a notoriety that this God-Man carries, and with it comes some expectations. You know, I heard that He opens blind eyes. I heard that He can unstop deaf ears. I heard that He can lay hands on the sick, and they recover. I heard that He could resurrect the dead and bring them back to life. But I haven't just heard about Jesus; you see, I have met and experienced Jesus through the power of the Holy Spirit. And I can tell you today with confidence, He is everything that you've heard about Him that's good.

== Composition ==
"Famous For (I Believe)" is composed in the key of B-flat major with a tempo of 172 beats per minute. Wells' vocal range spans from F_{3} to B♭_{4}.

== Music videos ==
On January 10, 2020, Tauren Wells published the official lyric video of "Famous For (I Believe)" on YouTube. On May 28, 2020, Wells released the official music video for "Famous For (I Believe)" featuring Jenn Johnson and Christine D'Clario, which was filmed at Lakewood Church in Houston, Texas. Wells released an acoustic performance video of the song on YouTube on September 17, 2020.

== Accolades ==
Awards
Year	Organization	Award	Result	Ref
2021	Grammy Awards	Best Contemporary Christian Music Performance/Song	Nominated	
2021	Billboard Music Awards	Top Christian Song	Nominated	
2021	GMA Dove Awards	Song of the Year	Nominated	
2021	GMA Dove Awards	Pop/Contemporary Recorded Song of the Year	Won	

== Track listing ==
"Famous For (I Believe)"
No.	Title	Length
1.	"Famous For (I Believe)" (featuring Jenn Johnson)	4:02

"Famous For (I Believe)" — Spanish/English Version
No.	Title	Length
1.	"Famous For (I Believe)" (Spanish/English Version; featuring Christine D'Clario)	4:02

"Famous For (I Believe)" — Sunday A.M. Version
No.	Title	Length
1.	"Famous For (I Believe)" (Sunday A.M. Version; with Jekalyn Carr and Donald Lawrence & Co.)	4:38

Famous For (I Believe) — Collection
No.	Title	Length
1.	"Famous For (I Believe)" (Dove Awards Version; featuring Jenn Johnson, Christine D'Clario and Jekalyn Carr)	4:35
2.	"Famous For (I Believe)" (Citizen of Heaven Live Version; featuring Jenn Johnson and Christine D'Clario)	4:06
3.	"Famous For (I Believe)" (featuring Jenn Johnson)	4:02
4.	"Tu Poder (Creo en Ti)" (featuring Christine D'Clario)	4:02
5.	"Famous For (I Believe)" (Sunday A.M. Version; with Jekalyn Carr and Donald Lawrence & Co.)	4:38
6.	"Famous For (I Believe)" (Spanish/English Version; featuring Christine D'Clario)	4:02
7.	"Famous For (I Believe)" (Song Session; with Essential Worship)	4:15
Total length:		29:42

Famous For (I Believe) — Collection Apple Music bonus content
No.	Title	Length
8.	"Famous For (I Believe)" (Dove Awards Version; featuring Jenn Johnson, Christine D'Clario and Jekalyn Carr; Music Video)	4:36
9.	"Famous For (I Believe)" (Citizen of Heaven Live Version; featuring Jenn Johnson and Christine D'Clario; Music Video)	4:04
10.	"Famous For (I Believe)" (Song Session; with Essential Worship; Music video)	4:16

== Charts ==
=== Weekly charts ===
Weekly chart performance for "Famous For (I Believe)"
Chart (2020–2021)	Peak position
US Bubbling Under Hot 100 (Billboard)	15
US Hot Christian Songs (Billboard)	3
US Christian Airplay (Billboard)	1
US Christian AC (Billboard)	2

=== Year-end charts ===
Year-end chart performance for "Famous For (I Believe)"
Chart (2020)	Position
US Christian Songs (Billboard)	21
US Christian Airplay (Billboard)	29
US Christian AC (Billboard)	27
Chart (2021)	Position
US Christian Songs (Billboard)	45
US Christian Airplay (Billboard)	29
US Christian AC (Billboard)	34

== Certifications ==
Region	Certification	Certified units/sales
United States (RIAA)	Gold	500,000^{‡}
^{‡} Sales+streaming figures based on certification alone.

== Release history ==
Region	Date	Version	Format	Label	Ref.
Various	January 10, 2020	Album	Digital download; streaming	Provident Label Group	
Various	January 10, 2020	Spanish/English (with Christine D'Clario)	Digital download; streaming	Provident Label Group	
United States	June 26, 2020	Album	Christian contemporary hit radio; Christian adult contemporary radio	Provident Label Group	
Various	October 30, 2020	Sunday A.M. Version (with Jekalyn Carr & Donald Lawrence & Co.)	Digital download; streaming	Provident Label Group	
Various	December 11, 2020	Collection (EP)	Digital download; streaming	Provident Label Group	
