= All the Earth =

Live album by The Belonging Co
- Released: September 8, 2017
- Recorded: 2017
- Venue: The Belonging Co, Nashville, Tennessee, U.S.
- Genre: Contemporary worship music
- Length: 107:34
- Label: TBCO Music
- Producer: Henry Seeley

The Belonging Co chronology
All the Earth (2017)	Awe + Wonder (2019)

All the Earth is the first live debut album by Nashville-based contemporary worship band The Belonging Co. The album was released through their imprint label, TBCO Music, on September 8, 2017. The featured worship leaders on the album are Meredith Andrews, Cody Carnes, Lauren Daigle, Hope Darst, Mia Fieldes, Andrew Holt, Kari Jobe, Maggie Reed, Sarah Reeves, and its producer Henry Seeley.

All the Earth was a commercial success, having debuted at No. 2 on the US Top Christian Albums chart.

== Background ==
The Belonging Co is a church situated in Nashville, Tennessee, that was founded by Henry and Alex Seeley in 2014. On September 8, 2017, they released their debut live album, All the Earth, which was recorded live at their church services in Nashville.

== Release and promotion ==
The Belonging Co released "Peace Be Still" by Lauren Daigle as the first promotional single from the album on September 1, 2017.

== Critical reception ==
Sydney Jones of The Echo gave a positive review of the album, saying, "Overall, the album reflects this sense of living a lifestyle that encompasses the heart of what true worship looks like." Jessica Morris of Others Magazine lauded the album in her review, saying, "This album has been created by some of the best in the worship industry and it shows on every track. Production is perfect, and the authenticity of the project will compel you to draw close to Christ as you listen to this album." Fin Sheridan wrote in a review for CBN Europe, "The songs of All The Earth carry a powerful sense of God’s presence. There are plenty of moments where only the musicians play giving plenty of space for reflection, personal songs and waiting on the Holy Spirit. The lyrics are powerful, many calling for deeper intimacy with God."

== Commercial performance ==
In the United States, All the Earth debuted on the Billboard Top Christian Albums chart at number two, having earned 3,000 equivalent album units in the first week of sales.

== Track listing ==
All the Earth
No.	Title	Writer(s)	Length
1.	"Zeal" (featuring Henry Seeley)	Mia Fieldes; Robert Marvin; Henry Seeley	4:03
2.	"Mountaintops" (featuring Henry Seeley)	Fieldes; Seth Mosley; H. Seeley	3:55
3.	"Fall" (featuring Andrew Holt and Meredith Andrews)	Fieldes; Andrew Holt; Joshua Silverberg	7:10
4.	"Peace Be Still" (featuring Lauren Daigle)	Hope Darst; Fieldes; Holt	8:06
5.	"Fall Afresh" (featuring Sarah Reeves)	Kari Jobe; Sarah Kothlow; H. Seeley	8:56
6.	"Testimony" (featuring Cody Carnes)	Fieldes; Mosley; Charles Starling; Joy Starling	6:25
7.	"Stay Here" (featuring Meredith Andrews)	Jobe; Jacob Sooter	5:24
8.	"Greater Than All" (featuring Henry Seeley)	Fieldes; Jason Ingram; H. Seeley	7:44
9.	"Here in Your Love" (featuring Hope Darst)	Darst; Silverberg	3:51
10.	"Beautiful Story" (featuring Mia Fieldes)	Fieldes; Holt; Marvin	7:00
11.	"Floodgates" (featuring Andrew Holt)	Fieldes; Holt; Sooter	7:13
12.	"You're Not Finished Yet" (featuring Maggie Reed)	Fieldes; Maggie Reed; H. Seeley	5:17
13.	"Surely (In This Place)" (featuring Andrew Holt)	Holt; Silverberg	5:24
14.	"Hunger and Thirst" (featuring Henry Seeley)	Fieldes; H. Seeley	8:46
15.	"Closer to Your Heart" (featuring Kari Jobe)	Cody Carnes; Jobe; Kothlow; Alex Seeley; H. Seeley	8:37
16.	"All the Earth" (featuring Henry Seeley)	H. Seeley	3:58
17.	"The Cross Has the Final Word" (featuring Henry Seeley)	Carnes	5:36
Total length:			107:34

== Charts ==
Chart performance for All the Earth
Chart (2017)	Peak position
US Christian Albums (Billboard)	2
US Independent Albums (Billboard)	20
US Top Album Sales (Billboard)	70

== Release history ==
Region	Date	Format(s)	Label(s)	Ref.
Various	September 8, 2017	Digital download; streaming	TBCO Music	
