= Awe + Wonder =

2017 live album by The Belonging Co

Live album by The Belonging Co
- Released: September 13, 2019
- Recorded: 2019
- Venue: The Belonging Co, Nashville, Tennessee, U.S.
- Genre: Contemporary worship music
- Length: 113:07
- Label: TBCO Music
- Producer: Henry Seeley

The Belonging Co chronology
All the Earth (2017)	Awe + Wonder (2019)	See the Light (2021)

Singles from Awe + Wonder
- 1. "Isn't He (This Jesus)" Released: March 28, 2018

Awe + Wonder is the second live album by Nashville-based contemporary worship band The Belonging Co. The album was released through their imprint label, TBCO Music, on September 13, 2019. The featured worship leaders on the album are Meredith Andrews, Cody Carnes, Hope Darst, Natalie Grant, Andrew Holt, Kari Jobe, Maggie Reed, Sarah Reeves, and Henry Seeley.

Awe + Wonder was supported by the release of "Isn't He (This Jesus)" as the lead and only single from the album. "Hosanna" was also released as a promotional single. The album debuted at No. 38 on the US Top Christian Albums chart.

== Release and promotion ==
=== Singles ===
On March 23, 2018, The Belonging Co released "Isn't He (This Jesus)" featuring Natalie Grant, as the lead single from the album. The song debuted at number 27 on the US Hot Christian Songs chart.

=== Promotional singles ===
On September 9, 2019, The Belonging Co released "Hosanna" featuring Kari Jobe as the first promotional single from their second live album, Awe + Wonder, announced that the album was slated for release on September 13.

== Critical reception ==
Jessica Morris of Others Magazine lauded the album in her review, describing the album as "an admirable follow-up, filled with a fresh and youthful energy," and concluding that is an "immaculate and well-crafted album, if you are looking for something new in worship, this is it."

== Chart performance ==
In the United States, Awe + Wonder debuted at number 38 on the Billboard Top Christian Albums chart dated September 28, 2019.

== Track listing ==
Awe + Wonder
No.	Title	Writer(s)	Length
1.	"Awe + Wonder" (featuring Daniella Mason and Andrew Holt)	Austin Davis; Andrew Holt; Daniella Mason	5:26
2.	"Breakthrough" (featuring Hope Darst)	Casey Brown; Hope Darst; Ian Keaggy; Charles Starling	4:05
3.	"Prize" (featuring Andrew Holt)	Davis; Holt; Lauren Strahm	4:19
4.	"Heaven Fall" (featuring Henry Seeley)	Cody Carnes; Matt Hammitt; Seth Mosley	7:09
5.	"Incense" (featuring Sarah Reeves)	Davis; Holt; Sarah Kothlow	8:17
6.	"Hosanna" (featuring Kari Jobe)	Ben Cantelon; Steffany Gretzinger; Nick Herbert	6:29
7.	"Seated On High" (featuring Andrew Holt)	Darst; Holt; Henry Seeley; Jacob Sooter	9:03
8.	"By the Blood" (featuring Henry Seeley)	Holt; Seeley; Joshua Silverberg; Sam Tinnesz	4:33
9.	"Smoke and Mirrors" (featuring Henry Seeley)	Casey Brown; Mia Fieldes; Holt; Seeley	4:03
10.	"Isn't He (This Jesus)" (featuring Natalie Grant)	Fieldes; Natalie Grant; Holt; Mosley	9:41
11.	"Face to Face" (featuring Maggie Reed)	Holt; Maggie Reed; Silverberg	6:59
12.	"At Your Whisper" (featuring Meredith Andrews)	Darst; Davis; Fieldes; Holt	9:47
13.	"Just Want You" (featuring Sarah Reeves)	Holt; Kothlow; Seeley; Silverberg	7:19
14.	"Nothing Else" (featuring Cody Carnes)	Hank Bentley; Carnes; Jessie Early	8:30
15.	"Love Like This" (featuring Hope Darst)	Darst; Holt; McKendree Tucker	10:27
16.	"No One Like You (Spontaneous)" (featuring Henry Seeley)	Seeley	3:02
17.	"Break Every Chain" (featuring Henry Seeley)	William Reagan	3:50
Total length:			113:07

== Charts ==
Chart performance for Awe + Wonder
Chart (2017)	Peak position
US Christian Albums (Billboard)	38

== Release history ==
Region	Date	Format(s)	Label(s)	Ref.
Various	September 13, 2019	Digital download; streaming	TBCO Music	
