= Citizen of Heaven =

Studio album by Tauren Wells
- Released: January 24, 2020
- Recorded: 2019
- Studio: The Studio, Franklin, Tennessee
- Genre: Christian pop; contemporary worship; R&B
- Length: 41:24
- Label: Provident Label Group
- Producer: Chuck Butler; Jordan Sapp; Kirk Franklin; Max Stark; Colby Wedgeworth; Rascal Flatts

Tauren Wells chronology
| Hills and Valleys (2017) | Citizen of Heaven (2020) | Joy in the Morning (2022) |

Singles from Citizen of Heaven
- 1. "Like You Love Me" Released: December 13, 2019; 2. "Famous For (I Believe)" Released: January 10, 2020; 3. "Until Grace" Released: February 14, 2020; 4. "Millionaire (Good Like That)" Released: February 14, 2020

Citizen of Heaven is the second studio album by American Christian pop musician Tauren Wells, which was released via Capitol Christian Music Group on January 24, 2020. The album contains guest appearances by Steven Furtick, Jenn Johnson, Kirk Franklin and Rascal Flatts. The album was produced by Chuck Butler, Jordan Sapp, Kirk Franklin, Max Stark, Colby Wedgeworth, and Rascal Flatts.

The album was marketed by the release of five singles: "Like You Love Me", "Famous For (I Believe)", “Close”, "Until Grace", and "Millionaire (Good Like That)".

Citizen of Heaven achieved commercial success in the United States, the album having debuted at No. 3 on Billboard's Top Christian Albums Chart, and at No. 169 on the mainstream Billboard 200 chart. The album won the GMA Dove Award for Pop/Contemporary Album of the Year at the 2020 GMA Dove Awards. Citizen of Heaven has garnered a Grammy Award nomination for Best Contemporary Christian Music Album at the 2021 Grammy Awards.

== Music and lyrics ==
The album is primarily a Christian pop album, which contains various genres such as dance-pop, R&B, worship, gospel, Christian country. The sound on the album has been likened to Michael Jackson's style, especially on the songs such as "Miracle", "Millionaire (Good Like That)" and "Like You Love Me".

== Release and promotion ==
=== Singles ===
"Like You Love Me" was serviced to Christian radio as the lead single from the album, impacting stations on December 13, 2019. "Like You Loved Me" peaked at No. 17 on the US Hot Christian Songs chart. On January 11, 2020, Wells released "Famous For (I Believe)" as the second single from the album. "Famous For (I Believe)" peaked at No. 3 on the US Hot Christian Songs chart.

"Until Grace" and "Millionaire (Good Like That)" were released on February 14, 2020, as the third and fourth singles from the album.

=== Promotional singles ===
On September 20, 2019, Tauren Wells released "Miracle" as the first promotional single from the album, concurrently launching the album's pre-order. "Close" was released as the second promotional single from the album on October 11, 2019. On November 1, 2019, Wells released "Perfect Peace" as the third promotional single from the album. On November 29, 2020, Wells released "Like You Love Me" as the fourth and final promotional single from the album.

== Critical reception ==
Professional ratings
Review scores
| Source | Rating |
|---|---|
| 365 Days of Inspiring Media | 4.5/5 |
| Jesus Freak Hideout | 4/5 stars |
| JubileeCast | 3.5/5 |
| Today's Christian Entertainment | 3.8/5 stars |

Izayab Thorb, reviewing for 24 Flix, opined that Wells "goes beyond the music and melody to deliver a diverse, yet uplifting message." In a positive review from 365 Days of Inspiring Media, Jonathan Andre lauded Wells, describing the album as being "dynamic and emotive as the first [Hills and Valleys], which was nothing short of powerful and unique." Jesus Freak Hideout's Josh Balogh stated in his review of the album: "Though the album isn't particularly innovative, it has many good things going for it. The production is crisp, the track listing is perfectly sequenced, guest vocals mostly deliver, everything is radio-ready, and it's fun to boot." Balogh that Citizen of Heaven was a slightly better album overall compared to Hills and Valleys. JubileeCaast's Timothy Yap gave a favourable review of the album, describing it as "Despite not being a perfect record, Citizen of Heaven is still a great Christian pop-centric record." NewReleaseToday's Jasmin Patterson praised the album, describing it as follows: "Citizen of Heaven is a top-notch pop album that will entertain you and help you connect with God at the same time. This one will be in your heavy rotation for months to come." Kelly Meade, indicating in a three-point-eight star review at Today's Christian Entertainment, says "Tauren's signature vocal style shines on this 13 track collection", concluding that the album is a "solid follow-up" to Hills and Valleys.

=== Accolades ===
Awards
| Year | Organization | Award | Result | Ref |
|---|---|---|---|---|
| 2020 | GMA Dove Awards | Pop/Contemporary Album of the Year | Won | |
| 2021 | Grammy Awards | Best Contemporary Christian Music Album | Nominated | |

== Commercial performance ==
In the United States, Citizen of Heaven earned 6,000 equivalent album units in its first week of sales, and as a result debuted at No. 3 on the Top Christian Albums Chart dated February 8, 2020, the band's fifth chart-topping release on the tally. The album concurrently registered on the mainstream Billboard 200 chart at No. 169.

== Track listing ==
Citizen of Heaven
| No. | Title | Writer(s) | Length |
|---|---|---|---|
| 1. | "Citizen of Heaven" | Chuck Butler; Ethan Hulse; Tauren Wells | 3:04 |
| 2. | "Like You Love Me" | Butler; Jordan Sapp; Wells | 3:30 |
| 3. | "Prelude with Pastor Steven Furtick of Elevation Worship" | | 0:29 |
| 4. | "Close" (featuring Steven Furtick) | Butler; Steven Furtick; Sapp; Wells | 2:47 |
| 5. | "Perfect Peace" | Jason Ingram; Colby Wedgeworth; Wells | 2:57 |
| 6. | "Famous For (I Believe)" (featuring Jenn Johnson) | Butler; Krissy Nordhoff; Sapp; Alexis Slifer; Wells | 4:02 |
| 7. | "Millionaire (Good Like That)" (with Kirk Franklin) | Monty Sam Montanez; Eric Ramey; Wells | 2:55 |
| 8. | "Done" | Butler; Nordhoff; Wells | 3:45 |
| 9. | "Miracle" | Butler; Luis Garcia; Sapp; Wells | 3:42 |
| 10. | "Until Grace" (with Rascal Flatts) | Butler; Hulse; Wells | 3:36 |
| 11. | "Trenches" | Butler; Hulse; Wells | 3:25 |
| 12. | "Love's Worth the Fight" | Butler; Sapp; Wells | 3:21 |
| 13. | "Carry On" | Butler; Jeff Pardo; Wells | 3:52 |
| Total length: | | | 41:24 |

== Personnel ==
Adapted from AllMusic.

- Jacob Arnold – drums
- Traci Sterling Bishir – A&R
- Jimmy Bovyiand – baritone sax, tenor sax
- Antony Brown – bass
- Luke Brown – background vocals
- Chuck Butler – background vocals, engineer, instrumentation, producer, programming
- Lilly Butler – keyboards
- Allen Caren – guitar
- Nickle Contey – background vocals
- Steven Darling – programming
- Daifah Davies – background vocals
- Jay DeMarcus – bass, electric guitar, piano, programming
- Jason Eskridge – background vocals
- Cara Fox – cello
- Kirk Franklin – featured artist, producer
- Steven Furtick – featured artist
- Ethan Hulse – keyboards
- Jenn Johnson – primary artist, vocals
- Jeremy Johnson – piano
- Daniel Kinner – drums
- Gary LeVox – vocals
- Jeremy Lubsey – assistant
- Jason McArthur – background vocals, executive producer
- Vlado Meller – mastering
- Sean Moffitt – mixing
- David Navejas – art direction, design
- Jeff Pardo – piano
- Steve Patrick – trumpet
- Justin Raines – bass guitar
- Rascal Flatts – primary artist, producer
- Joe Don Rooney – background vocals, electric guitar
- Kevin Rooney – program assistant, programming
- Tim Rosenau – rhythm guitar
- Jordan Sapp – background vocals, engineer, instrumentation, mixing, producer, programming
- Keith Everette Smith – trumpet
- Mitchell Solarek – executive producer
- Max Stark – producer, programming
- Chris Strawder – percussion
- Rick Watford – electric guitar
- Colby Wedgeworth – background vocals, guitar, producer, programming
- Kermit Wells – drums
- Tauren Wells – background vocals, keyboards, primary artist
- Alex Williams – guitar

== Charts ==
=== Weekly charts ===
Weekly chart performance for Citizen of Heaven
| Chart (2020) | Peak position |
|---|---|
| US Billboard 200 | 169 |
| US Christian Albums (Billboard) | 3 |
| US Top Tastemaker Albums (Billboard) | 2 |

=== Year-end charts ===
Year-end chart performance for Citizen of Heaven
| Chart (2020) | Position |
|---|---|
| US Christian Albums (Billboard) | 38 |
| Chart (2021) | Position |
| US Christian Albums (Billboard) | 28 |
| Chart (2022) | Position |
| US Christian Albums (Billboard) | 61 |

== Release history ==
| Region | Date | Format(s) | Label(s) | Ref. |
|---|---|---|---|---|
| Various | January 24, 2020 | CD; digital download; streaming | Provident Label Group | |
