= 52nd GMA Dove Awards =

2021 US music awards ceremony

- Date: October 19, 2021
- Location: Allen Arena, Nashville, Tennessee
- Country: United States
- Hosted by: Jonathan McReynolds and Natalie Grant

Highlights
- Most awards: Cece Winans, Elevation Worship and Jason Ingram (4 each)
- Most nominations: Steven Furtick (10)
- Website: www.doveawards.com

Television/radio coverage
- Network: TBN (October 22, 2021 at 8 p.m. ET)

The 52nd Annual GMA Dove Awards presentation ceremony was held on Tuesday, October 19, 2021, at the Allen Arena located in Nashville, Tennessee. The ceremony recognized the accomplishments of musicians and other figures within the Christian music industry for the year 2021. The awards show was aired on the Trinity Broadcasting Network on Friday, October 22, 2021.

The nominees were announced on August 11, 2021, with producer and songwriter Steven Furtick leading ten nominations among non-artists, whilst Elevation Worship and Brandon Lake led the artist nominations with seven each. CeCe Winans won the most awards, with 4 including Gospel Artist of the Year, alongside producer Jason Ingram and worship band Elevation Worship, who both also clinched 4 awards each, the latter winning Song of the Year for "The Blessing". Pop duo For King & Country won their second consecutive Artist of the Year, whilst Maverick City Music took home the New Artist of the Year award.

== Nominations announcement ==
The nominations were announced on August 11, 2021, during a livestream event which was broadcast on the GMA Dove Awards' Facebook page and YouTube channel. The event featured Alex Campos, John Cooper, Bill and Gloria Gaither, Kari Jobe, Brian and Jenn Johnson, Jonathan McReynolds, Wande and Tauren Wells as the announcers.

== Performers ==
The following musical artists performed at the 52nd GMA Dove Awards:

- Brandon Lake
- Cain
- CeCe Winans
- Dante Bowe
- Donnie McClurkin
- Elevation Worship
- Hope Darst
- Jonathan McReynolds
- Kelontae Gavin
- KB
- Koryn Hawthorne
- Lauren Daigle
- Mali Music
- Matt Redman
- Maverick City Music
- Natalie Grant
- The Isaacs
- We the Kingdom
- Zach Williams

== Presenters ==
The following served as presenters at the 52nd GMA Dove Awards:

- Anthony Brown
- Blanca
- Brooke Ligertwood
- Christine D'Clario
- Chris Tomlin
- Cory Asbury
- Evan Craft
- Francesca Battistelli
- Hezekiah Walker
- Jason Crabb
- Jay DeMarcus
- Jekalyn Carr
- Joel Houston
- Joseph Habedank
- Kelontae Gavin
- Kevin Quinn
- Lecrae
- Mali Music
- Pastor Mike Jr.
- Sinach
- Social Club Misfits

== Nominees and winners ==
This is a complete list of the nominees & winners for the 52nd GMA Dove Awards. Winners are in bold.

=== General ===
Song of the Year

- "Another in the Fire"
  - (writers) Chris Davenport, Joel Houston, (publishers) Hillsong MP Songs, Hillsong Music Publishing Australia
- "Famous For (I Believe)"
  - (writers) Alexis Slifer, Chuck Butler, Jordan Sapp, Krissy Nordhoff, Tauren Wells, (publishers) All Essential Music, Be Essential Songs, Buddybabe Music, Capitol CMG Paragon, Crucial Music Entertainment, Integrity's Praise! Music, Jord A Lil Music, Nordained Music, Songs By JSapp
- "Graves into Gardens"
  - (writers) Steven Furtick, Chris Brown, Tiffany Hudson, Brandon Lake, (publishers) Bethel Music Publishing, Brandon Lake Music, Maverick City Publishing Worldwide, Music by Elevation Worship Publishing
- "Speak to Me"
  - (writers) Donnie McClurkin, Jeremy Hicks, Johnta Austin, Troy Taylor, (publishers) Don Mac Music, Naked Under My Clothes Music, Peermusic III Ltd, Savgos Music Inc, Sony/Atv Tunes Llc, W S Music
- "Thank You for It All"
  - (writers) Aaron Lindsey, Christopher Thomas Leach, Jamone Davis, Marvin Sapp, (publishers) Capitol Cmg Paragon, Five Lions Publishing, Jarmone Hoox Davis Publishing, Marvin L. Sapp Music, Universal Music Brentwood Benson Songs
- **"The Blessing"**
  - **(writers) Chris Brown, Cody Carnes, Kari Jobe, Steven Furtick, (publishers) Capitol CMG Paragon, Kari Jobe Carnes Music, Music by Elevation Worship Publishing, Worship Together Music, Writer's Roof Publishing**
- "The Father's House"
  - (writers) Benjamin Hastings, Cory Asbury, Ethan Hulse, (publishers) Be Essential Songs, Bethel Music Publishing, Cory Asbury Publishing, EGH Music Publishing, SHOUT! Music Publishing Australia
- "There Was Jesus"
  - (writers) Jonathan Smith, Casey Beathard, Zach Williams, (publishers) Anthems of Hope, Be Essential Songs, Cashagamble Jet Music, Little Louder Songs, Seven Ring Circus Songs, Wisteria Drive
- "Together"
  - (writers) Joel Smallbone, Josh Kerr, Kirk Franklin, Luke Smallbone, Ran Jackson, Ricky Jackson (publishers) Curb Dayspring Music, Curb Word Music, Heavenly Junkie Music, Kilns Music, Method to the Madness, Richmond Park Publishing, Shankel Songs, Shaun Shankel Pub Designee, Warner-Tamerlane Publishing Corp., WC Music Corp.
- "Truth Be Told"
  - (writers) AJ Pruis, Matthew West, (publishers) Combustion Five, Get Ur Seek On, Highly Combustible Music, Two Story House Music

Songwriter of the Year

- **Brandon Lake**
- Chris Brown
- Ed Cash
- Kirk Franklin
- Matthew West

Songwriter of the Year (Non-artist)

- Ethan Hulse
- **Jason Ingram**
- Jordan Sapp
- Steven Furtick
- Tiffany Hammer

Contemporary Christian Artist of the Year

- For King & Country, Curb | Word Entertainment
- Hillsong United, Hillsong Music
- Tauren Wells, Provident Label Group
- **We the Kingdom, Sparrow Records**
- Zach Williams, Essential Records / Provident

Southern Gospel Artist of the Year

- **Ernie Haase & Signature Sound, Gaither Music**
- Gaither Vocal Band, Gaither Music
- Jason Crabb, Red Street Records
- Joseph Habedank, Daywind Records
- Triumphant Quartet, StowTown

Gospel Artist of the Year

- **CeCe Winans, Pure Springs Gospel / Fair Trade**
- Jonathan McReynolds, E1 Music
- Kirk Franklin, RCA Inspiration
- Tasha Cobbs Leonard, Motown Gospel
- Travis Greene, RCA Inspiration

Artist of the Year

- Elevation Worship, Elevation Worship Records
- **For King & Country, Curb | Word Entertainment**
- Lauren Daigle, Centricity Music
- Phil Wickham, Fair Trade
- Zach Williams, Essential Records / Provident

New Artist of the Year

- Brandon Lake, Bethel Music
- Cain, Provident Label Group
- Dante Bowe, Bethel Music
- Hope Darst, Fair Trade
- **Maverick City Music, Tribl Records**

Producer of the Year

- AyRon Lewis
- The Creak Music (David Leonard, Brad King, Seth Talley)
- Jordan Mohilowski
- **Jordan Sapp**
- Wayne Haun

=== Rap/Hip Hop ===
Rap/Hip Hop Recorded Song of the Year

- "10K" – KB
  - (writers) Kevin Elijah Burgess, Wes the Writer, Quinten Coblentz, Jonas Myrin, Matt Redman
- **"Deep End" – Lecrae**
  - **(writers) Lecrae Moore, Anthony MrWriteNow Gardner**
- "Glory on Me" – Steven Malcolm, featuring Childish Major and Taylor Hill
  - (writers) Joseph Prielozny, Markus Randle, Steven Malcolm, Taylor Hill, Torrance Esmond
- "Is That Okay?" – Social Club Misfits
  - (writers) Martin Santiago, Fernando Miranda, Jimmy James
- "Reasons" – Hulvey, featuring Lecrae, SVRCINA
  - (writers) Christopher Michael Hulvey, Zach Paradis, Lecrae Moore, Molly Svrcina, Sam Tinnesz, Joe Williams

Rap/Hip Hop Album of the Year

- 1970-01-01 03:34:00 – Zauntee
  - (producers) Zauntee, Jordan Mohilowski, Geoff Duncan, Mako, Riley Friesen, Jordan Sapp
- Feared By Hell – Social Club Misfits
  - (producers) Jimmy James, Martin Santiago, Samuel Ash, Tommee Profitt, Dirty Rice, Ben Lopez, Juicebangers
- **His Glory Alone – KB**
  - **(producers) Quinten Coblentz, Wes Writer, Jacob Cardec, Mashell Leroy, DJ Pez, Tee-Wyla Swoope, Kevin Elijah Burgess**
- Restoration – Lecrae
  - (producers) Dave James, Lasanna "Ace" Harris, Taylor Hill, Alex Medina, Raymond Castro "Ray Rock", Gawvi, S1 for S.K.P.
- The Divine Storm – Ty Brasel
  - (producers) Dirty Rice, Joseph Prielozny, Juicebangers, Ty Brasel

=== Rock/Contemporary ===
Rock/Contemporary Recorded Song of the Year

- "I Need a Ghost" – Brandon Lake
  - (writers) Brandon Lake, Joshua Silverberg
- "A Place Called Earth" – Jon Foreman, featuring Lauren Daigle
  - (writers) Jonathan Foreman, Tim Foreman, Lauren Daigle
- "Stand My Ground" – Zach Williams
  - (writers) Zach Williams, Jonathan Smith, Hank Bentley
- "This Is the Kingdom" - Skillet
  - (writers) John L. Cooper, Mia Fieldes, Seth Mosley
- **"Who Am I" - Needtobreathe**
  - **(writers) Bear Rinehart, Thomas Rhett, Jordan Reynolds, Cason Cooley, Jeremy Lutito**

Rock/Contemporary Album of the Year

- Departures – Jon Foreman
  - (producers) Jon Foreman, Erick Owyoung, Tim Foreman, Jeremy Larson, Darren King
- **Out of Body – Needtobreathe**
  - **(producers) Needtobreathe, Cason Cooley, Jeremy Lutito**
- Songs of Death and Resurrection – Demon Hunter
  - (producer) Jeremiah Scott
- The Joy of Being – Citizens
  - (producers) Brian Eichelberger, Zach Bolen
- The Path – Fit for a King
  - (producer) WZRD BLD

=== Pop/Contemporary ===
Pop/Contemporary Recorded Song of the Year

- **"Famous For (I Believe)" – Tauren Wells**
  - **(writers) Alexis Slifer, Chuck Butler, Jordan Sapp, Krissy Nordhoff, Tauren Wells**
- "Good God Almighty" – Crowder
  - (writers) David Crowder, Ben Glover, Jeff Sojka
- "Hold on to Me" – Lauren Daigle
  - (writers) Lauren Daigle, Paul Duncan, Paul Mabury
- "There Was Jesus" - Zach Williams, featuring Dolly Parton
  - (writers) Jonathan Smith, Casey Beathard, Zach Williams
- "Together" - For King & Country, Tori Kelly and Kirk Franklin
  - (writers) Joel Smallbone, Josh Kerr, Kirk Franklin, Luke Smallbone, Ran Jackson, Ricky Jackson

Pop/Contemporary Album of the Year

- Chris Tomlin & Friends – Chris Tomlin
  - (producer) Chris Tomlin, Corey Crowder, Tyler Hubbard, Brian Kelley, Ed Cash, Dave Haywood, David Garcia
- **Holy Water – We the Kingdom**
  - **(producers) We the Kingdom, Ed Cash, Steven V. Taylor**
- Inhale (Exhale) – MercyMe
  - (producers) Brown Bannister, Jordan Mohilowski, Tedd Tjornhom, Chris Stevens, Micah Kuiper, David Leonard, Ben Glover
- No Stranger – Natalie Grant
  - (producers) Bernie Herms for SoulFuel Productions, Joseph Prielozny, Dirty Rice for COBRA
- To Love a Fool – Cory Asbury
  - (producers) Paul Mabury

=== Inspirational ===
Inspirational Recorded Song of the Year

- "A Woman" – Faithful, Ellie Holcomb and Amy Grant
  - (writers) Ellie Holcomb, Ann VosKamp, Sarah MacIntosh
- "Alone with My Faith" – Harry Connick, Jr.
  - (writer) Harry Connick, Jr.
- **"Great Is Thy Faithfulness" – Carrie Underwood, featuring CeCe Winans**
  - **(writers) Thomas Obadiah Chisholm, William M. Runyan**
- "Promise Keeper" – Hope Darst
  - (writers) Hope Darst, Jonathan Smith, Ethan Hulse
- "There Is a God" – Phillips, Craig & Dean
  - (writers) Randy Phillips, Matthew West, AJ Pruis

Inspirational Album of the Year

- All Things – Jaime Jamgochian
  - (producers) Jaime Jamgochian, Jeremy Redmon, Andrew Berthgold, Antonio Porcheddu, Benton Miles, Micah Kuiper, Tommy Iceland, Austin Cannon
- Evensong - Hymns and Lullabies at the Close of Day – Keith & Kristyn Getty, Sandra McCracken, Skye Peterson, Vince Gill, Ellie Holcomb, Sierra Hull, Deborah Klemme, The Getty Girls, Heather Headley
  - (producers) Ben Shive, Keith & Kristyn Getty
- **Step into My Story – Selah**
  - **(producers) Jason Kyle Saetveit**
- You Are More – Tiffany Coburn
  - (producers) Wayne Haun, Mike Swift
- You're Still God – Phillips, Craig & Dean
  - (producer) Nathan Nockels

=== Southern Gospel ===
Southern Gospel Recorded Song of the Year

- "First Church of Mercy" – The Sound
  - (writers) Aaron Wilburn, Lee Black
- "I Just Feel Like Something Good Is About to Happen" – Gaither Vocal Band
  - (writer) William J. Gaither
- **"My King is Known By Love" – Crabb Family**
  - **(writers) Jason Cox, Jeff Bumgardner, Kenna West**
- "Religion Isn't Working" – Joseph Habedank
  - (writers) Jesse Reeves, Joseph Habedank, Michael Farren, Nick Romes, Tony Wood
- "Wake Up" – Ernie Haase & Signature Sound
  - (writers) Ernie Haase, Wayne Haun, Joel Lindsey

Southern Gospel Album of the Year

- Bigger Than Sunday – Triumphant Quartet
  - (producers) Wayne Haun, Scott Inman, Jason Webb, Kris Crunk, Chipper Hammond, Joshua Frerichs
- **Change Is Coming – Joseph Habedank**
  - **(producer) Dottie Leonard Miller, Wayne Haun, Joseph Habedank, Lindsey Habedank**
- It's Still Good News – Guardians
  - (producers) Wayne Haun, John Darin Rowesy
- That's Gospel, Brother – Gaither Vocal Band
  - (producer) Gordon Mote, Bill Gaither
- The Journey – Greater Vision
  - (producers) Trey Ivey, Gerald Wolfe

=== Bluegrass/Country/Roots ===
Bluegrass/Country/Roots Recorded Song of the Year

- "Because He Lives" - Harry Connick, Jr.
  - (writers) Bill Gaither, Gloria Gaither
- "Better Off There" – The Browns
  - (writers) Wayne Haun, Sonya Issacs Yeary, Jimmy Yeary
- "Go Rest High on That Mountain" – Fortune/Walker/Rogers/Isaacs
  - (writers) Vince Gill
- "Great God Almighty" – The Sound
  - (writers) David Carr, Johnny Powell, Mark Lee
- **"If God Pulled Back the Curtain" – The Nelons**
  - **(writers) Jason Cox, Kenna Turner West, Michael Boggs**

Bluegrass/Country/Roots Album of the Year

- Alone with My Faith – Harry Connick, Jr.
  - (producer) Harry Connick Jr.
- Little More Love – Jordan Family Band
  - (producers) Joshua Jordan, Gordon Mote
- My Savior – Carrie Underwood
  - (producers) Carrie Underwood, David Garcia
- Peace at Last - The Nelons
  - (producers) Dottie Leonard Miller, Wayne Haun, Jason Clark
- **Songs for the Times - The Isaacs**
  - **(producers) Ben Isaacs, The Isaacs**

=== Contemporary Gospel ===
Contemporary Gospel Recorded Song of the Year

- "I Got It" – Pastor Mike Jr.
  - (writer) Amanda Gentry, Anthony R. Pettus Jr., Pastor Mike Jr.
- **"Joyful" – Dante Bowe**
  - **(writers) Dante Bowe, Ben Schofield**
- "Never Lost" - CeCe Winans
  - (writers) Chris Brown, Steven Furtick, Tiffany Hammer
- "Speak to Me" – Koryn Hawthorne
  - (writer) Donnie McClurkin, Jeremy Hicks, Johnta Austin, Troy Taylor
- "Touch from You" – Tamela Mann
  - (writers) Rickey "Slikk Muzik" Offord, Andrew Collins, II, Jeremy "J-Mu" Hairston, Emerald Campbell, Quennel Gaskin, Tamela Mann

Contemporary Gospel Album of the Year

- DOE - EP – DOE
  - (producers) Jonathan McReynolds, Darryl "Lil Man" Howell, Rogest "Roscoe" Carstarphen
- Gospel According to PJ – PJ Morton
  - (producer) PJ Morton
- **I Am – Koryn Hawthorne**
  - **(producers) Troy Taylor, Johntá Austin, Jeremy "TryBishop" Hicks, Camper, KJ Scriven, Greg Cox, Anthony "Kid Class" Wyley, Connor Little, Jason Ingram, Matt Maher, Jacob Sooter**
- Still – Brian Courtney Wilson
  - (producer) Dana T. Soréy, Jeff Pardo, Justin Savage, Tyrone Belle, Brian Courtney Wilson
- The Book of Mali – Mali Music
  - (producers) David D1 Grant, Derrick Harvin

=== Traditional Gospel ===
Traditional Gospel Recorded Song of the Year

- **"Changing Your Story" – Jekalyn Carr**
  - **(writer) Jekalyn Carr**
- "Help" – Anthony Brown & Group therAPy
  - (writers) Anthony Brown, Darryl Woodson
- "I Made It" – Maranda Curtis
  - (writers) Maranda Curtis, Dana Sorey, Justin Gilbert
- "Repay You" – PJ Morton, featuring J Moss
  - (writer) Paul Sylvester Morton Jr.
- "Wonderful Is Your Name" – Melvin Crispel III
  - (writer) Melvin Crispell III

Traditional Gospel Album of the Year

- Celebrating Fisk! (The 150th Anniversary Album) – Fisk Jubilee Singers
  - (producers) Shannon Sanders, Jim Ed Norman, Mike Curb
- Changing Your Story – Jekalyn Carr
  - (producer) Allen Carr
- Choirmaster – Ricky Dillard
  - (producers) Ricky Dillard, Michael Taylor, Will Bogle, Quadrius Salters
- **Chosen Vessel – Marvin Sapp**
  - **(producer) Aaron Lindsey**
- The Reunion – Jonathan Nelson
  - (producers) Jonathan Nelson, Kenneth Shelton

=== Gospel Worship ===
Gospel Worship Recorded Song of the Year

- "**Believe for It" – CeCe Winans**
  - **(writers) CeCe Winans, Kyle Lee, Mitch Wong, Dwan Hill**
- "Good & Loved" – Travis Greene, featuring Steffany Gretzinger
  - (writer) Travis Greene
- "Never Be Defeated" – Rich Tolbert Jr.
  - (writer) Rich Tolbert Jr.
- "Voice of God" – Dante Bowe, featuring Steffany Gretzinger, Chandler Moore
  - (writers) Dante Bowe, Jeff Schneeweis, Mitch Wong, Tywan Mack
- "You Get The Glory" – Jonathan Traylor
  - (writer) Jonathan Traylor

Gospel Worship Album of the Year

- **Believe for It – CeCe Winans**
  - **(producers) Kyle Lee, Dwan Hill**
- Come Alive (Deluxe) – All Nations Music
  - (producer) Ernest Vaughan
- Never Be Defeated – Rich Tolbert Jr.
  - (producers) Rich Tolbert Jr., Joshua Easley, Will Davis, Shajuan Andrews
- The N.O.W. Experience – Kelontae Gavin
  - (producers) Kelontae Gavin, Marquis Boone
- VaShawn Mitchell Presents Africa Worship – Various Artists
  - (producer) VaShawn Mitchell

=== Spanish Language ===
Spanish Language Recorded Song of the Year

- "Amén" – Ricardo Montaner, Evaluna Montaner, Mau y Ricky, y Camilo
  - (writers) Ricardo Montaner, Camilo Echeverry, Ricky Montaner, Mau Montaner, Evaluna Montaner, Richi López
- **"Donde Está El Espíritu De Dios" – Christine D'Clario**
  - **(writers) Christine D'Clario, Chris Tomlin, Jason Ingram, Ben Fielding, Seth Mosley**
- "Llévame A La Cruz" – Majo y Dan
  - (writers) Eduardo Danilo Ruiz Guzmán, María José Solís González, David Hernández Pimentel
- "Mi Libertador" – Miel San Marcos, Christine D'Clario
  - (writers) Josh Morales, Sayra Morales, Luis Morales Jr, Christine D'Clario
- "Tumbas A Jardines" – Elevation Worship, featuring Brandon Lake
  - (writers) Steven Furtick, Chris Brown, Tiffany Hudson, Brandon Lake

Spanish Language Album of the Year

- **Desesperado (Spanish) – Evan Craft**
  - **(producer) Sean Cook**
- Mil Generaciones – Miel San Marcos, Essential Worship
  - (producers) Sam Ash, Alexandria Davila, Henry Alonzo, Diana Alfonso
- Renovada - EP – Blanca
  - (producers) Gawvi, Samuel ASH
- Todos Mis Mejores Amigos – Hillsong Young & Free, Hillsong En Español
  - (producers) Ben Tan, Cameron Robertson, Michael Guy Chislett, Michael Fatkin, Aodhan King, Laura Toggs
- Uno – Alex Zurdo - Redimi2 - Funky
  - (producer) Luis "Funky" Marrero

=== Worship ===
Worship Recorded Song of the Year

- "Battle Belongs" – Phil Wickham
  - (writers) Phil Wickham, Brian Johnson
- "God So Loved" – We the Kingdom
  - (writers) Ed Cash, Scott Cash, Franni Cash, Martin Cash, Andrew Bergthold
- **"Graves into Gardens" – Elevation Worship, featuring Brandon Lake**
  - **(writers) Steven Furtick, Chris Brown, Tiffany Hudson, Brandon Lake**
- "Jireh" – Elevation Worship / Maverick City Music, featuring Chandler Moore and Naomi Raine
  - (writers) Steven Furtick, Chris Brown, Chandler Moore, Naomi Raine
- "Peace Be Still" – Hope Darst
  - (writers) Hope Darst, Mia Fieldes, Andrew Holt

Worship Album of the Year

- Graves into Gardens – Elevation Worship
  - (producers) Steven Furtick, Aaron Robertson, Chris Brown, Jonathan Mix
- **Old Church Basement – Elevation Worship / Maverick City Music**
  - **(producers) Steven Furtick, Chris Brown, Jason Ingram, Tony Brown, Jonathan Jay**
- Revival's in the Air – Bethel Music
  - (producer) Brian Johnson, Joel Taylor, David Whitworth, John-Paul Gentile, Mathew Ogden
- The Blessing (Live) – Kari Jobe
  - (producers) Henry Seeley, Cody Carnes, Austin Davis, Jacob Sooter, McKendree Tucker
- The People Tour: Live from Madison Square Garden – Hillsong United
  - (producers) Joel Houston, Michael Guy Chislett

=== Other categories ===
Children's Album of the Year

- Living Color – Elevation Church Kids
  - (producers) Steven Furtick, Aaron Robertson
- No Reason To Wait – Worship Together Kids
  - (producers) Terryl Padilla, John Roberts
- **Ready Set Go – Yancy & Little Praise Party**
  - **(producer) Stephen Leiweke**
- Sing The Bible, Vol. 4 – Slugs And Bugs
  - (producer) Ben Shive
- Todos Mis Días – Gateway Kids Worship
  - (producers) Julian Collazos, Kyle Lee, Josh Alltop

Christmas / Special Event Album of the Year

- **A Drummer Boy Christmas – For King & Country**
  - **(producers) Benjamin Backus, Tedd T., For King & Country**
- A Tori Kelly Christmas – Tori Kelly
  - (producers) Kenny "Babyface" Edmonds, Demonte Posey, Tori Kelly, Wendy Wang
- Christmas: Acoustic Sessions – Phil Wickham
  - (producer) David Cook
- Miracle Of Love: Christmas Songs Of Worship – Chris Tomlin
  - (producers) Ed Cash, Corey Crowder
- Reunited LIVE – Gaither Vocal Band
  - (producer) Bill Gaither

Musical/Choral Collection

- **Behold The Lamb Of God**
  - **(creators) Andrew Peterson, (arrangers/orchestrators) Carson Wagner, Russell Mauldin**
- Christmas Comes Alive
  - (creators/arrangers/orchestrators) Devin McGlamery, Cliff Duren, Phillip Keveren, Phil Nitz
- I Choose Christ: The Songs of Sue C. Smith
  - (creator/arranger) Cliff Duren, (creator) Sue C. Smith
- Love Lifted Up: An Easter Musical
  - (creators/arrangers/orchestrators) Jason Cox, Joseph Habedank, Cliff Duren, Jay Rouse, Marty Hamby, Phil Nitz
- Love Was Born A King
  - (creators/arrangers/orchestrators) Joel Lindsey, Jeff Bumgardner

Recorded Music Packaging of the Year

- A Drummer Boy Christmas – For King & Country
  - (art director)Blair McDermott, (photographer) Robby Klein, (illustrator) Andrew Cherry
- **Graves into Gardens – Elevation Worship**
  - **(art directors) Jacob Boyles, Ryan Hollingsworth, (graphic artist) Jacob Boyles, (photographer) Paul C. Rivera**
- Revival's in the Air – Bethel Music
  - (art director/photographer) Stephen James Hart, (photographers) Chad Vegas, Jordana Griffith, Caleb Marmolejo
- Songs of Death and Resurrection - Deluxe Box – Demon Hunter
  - (art director/graphic artist/illustrator/photographer) Ryan Clark
- The Blessing (Live) – Kari Jobe
  - (art director/graphic artist/photographer) Connor Dwyer, (art director/photographer) Rachel Dwyer

=== Videos and films ===
Short Form Video of the Year

- **"Help Is on the Way (Maybe Midnight)" – TobyMac**
  - **(director) Eric Welch, (producer) Scott McDaniel**
- "Hold on to Me" – Lauren Daigle
  - (directors/producers) John Gray, Leigh Holt
- "Is That Okay?" – Social Club Misfits
  - (director/producer) Anler Hernandez
- "Truth Be Told" – Matthew West
  - (directors/producers) Kyle Lollis, Ashley Lollis
- "Walking Backwards" – Mike Mains & The Branches
  - (directors) Robbie Barnett, Carson Butcher

Long Form Video of the Year

- **Burn The Ships Concert Film – For King & Country**
  - **(directors/producers) Ben Smallbone, Andrea Royer**
- House of Miracles (Live) – Brandon Lake
  - (director/producer) Caleb Marmolejo
- Natalie Grant & Bernie Herms at Ryman Auditorium – Natalie Grant
  - (directors/producers) Kristi Brazell, Shelby Goldsmith
- Still: The Artistry & Life of Fanny J. Crosby Reimagined – Ashley Elizabeth Sarver & O.N.U. Theatre Original Cast
  - (directors/producers) Ashley Elizabeth Sarver, Joe Mantarian
- The People Tour: Live from Madison Square Garden – Hillsong United
  - (director) Nathaniel Redekop, (producers) Johnny Rays, Jessica Ico

Inspirational Film of the Year

- **A Week Away**
  - **(director) Roman White, (producer) Alan Powell**
- Fatima
  - (director) Marco Pontecorvo, (producers) Stefano Buono, Rose Ganguzza
- Mahalia
  - (director) Kenny Leon, (producers) Moshe Bardach, Charles Cooper
- My Brother's Keeper
  - (director) Kevan Otto, (producers) Robert C. Bigelow, Daniel Buggs
- Queen Esther
  - (director) Ryan Miller, (producer) Dean Sell
