= Peace Be Still (Hope Darst album) =

2020 studio album by Hope Darst

Studio album by Hope Darst
- Released: August 21, 2020
- Recorded: 2020
- Studio: The Tracking Room, Nashville, Tennessee, U.S.
- Genre: Contemporary worship; contemporary Christian music
- Length: 48:35
- Label: Fair Trade Services; Columbia
- Producer: Jonathan Smith; Max Corwin

Singles from Peace Be Still
- 1. "Peace Be Still" Released: February 7, 2020; 2. "Promise Keeper" Released: December 26, 2020

Peace Be Still is the debut studio album by American contemporary Christian singer Hope Darst. The album was released on August 21, 2020, by Fair Trade Services and Columbia Records. The album was produced by Jonathan Smith and Max Corwin.

The album has been supported by the release of "Peace Be Still" and "Promise Keeper" as singles. "Peace Be Still" peaked at No. 2 on the Hot Christian Songs chart. "Promise Keeper" peaked at No. 26 on the Hot Christian Songs chart. "Set Free" was released as a promotional single. The album debuted at number 23 on Billboard's Top Christian Albums Chart in the United States.

== Release and promotion ==
=== Singles ===
Hope Darst released "Peace Be Still" as the lead single to the album on February 7, 2020. "Peace Be Still" peaked at number six on the US Hot Christian Songs chart. "Peace Be Still" received a nomination for the GMA Dove Award Worship Recorded Song of the Year at the 2021 GMA Dove Awards.

"Promise Keeper" was released to Christian radio in the United States on December 26, 2020, as the second single from the album. "Promise Keeper" peaked at No. 26 on the US Hot Christian Songs chart. "Promise Keeper" received a nomination for the GMA Dove Award Inspirational Recorded Song of the Year at the 2021 GMA Dove Awards.

=== Promotional singles ===
Hope Darst initially released "Promise Keeper" and "Set Free" as the two promotional singles in the lead-up to the release of the album on July 10, 2020, launching the album's digital pre-order.

== Critical reception ==
Professional ratings
Review scores
Source	Rating
365 Days of Inspiring Media	4/5
Jesus Freak Hideout	2/5 stars

Joshua Andre in his 365 Days of Inspiring Media review, said: "I'm of the opinion that though some lyrics are cliché overall, the heart for Jesus and the passion behind the album still ring true. Peace Be Still may not be my favourite album of the year, but it is an album that will bless and inspire you," Jesus Freak Hideout's Joel Zaloum wrote a negative review of the album, saying: "There's no doubt Hope Darst has the potential to make it big in the Christian music scene, and she's obviously well on her way to doing so. But for this reviewer, her popularity says a lot more about the current state of popular Christian music then anything else. While I cannot deny her obvious enthusiasm and heart for the Lord, as an album, Peace Be Still is a miss." "Hope’s powerful and gorgeous vocals keep me hanging on every word she sings. She invites listeners into her life by sharing what's on her heart. The standout songs each feature an engaging and emotive musical style while phrasing her prayer-filled songs in a creative and personal way, making it one of my top worship albums of the year."

== Commercial performance ==
In the United States, Peace Be Still debuted at number 23 on the Billboard Top Christian Albums chart dated September 5, 2020.

== Track listing ==
Peace Be Still
No.	Title	Writer(s)	Length
1.	"Surrender"	Hope Darst; Jonathan Smith; Max Corwin; David Curran; Austin Davis; Taylor Johnson; McKendree Tucker	1:16
2.	"Set Free"	Darst; Smith; Mia Fieldes	4:04
3.	"Promise Keeper"	Darst; Smith; Ethan Hulse	5:00
4.	"Sing My Way Through"	Darst; Fieldes; Henry Seeley	2:22
5.	"Peace Be Still"	Darst; Fieldes; Andrew Holt	5:20
6.	"Who You've Always Been"	Darst; Ben Cantelon; Lauren Strahm	4:43
7.	"Love Like This"	Darst; Holt; Tucker	5:12
8.	"Don't Let Go"	Darst; Fieldes; Smith	4:26
9.	"Let It Out"	Darst; Smith; Max Corwin; Charles Starling; Robert Marvin	3:36
10.	"The Hope of Jesus"	Darst; Smith; Jason Ingram	4:48
11.	"I Glorify"	Darst; Fieldes; Cantelon	4:32
12.	"Start Over"	Darst; Fieldes; Cantelon	3:20
Total length:			48:35

== Personnel ==
Credits adapted from AllMusic.

- Jacob Arnold — drums, percussion
- Jess Barrios — make-up
- Max Corwin — bass, editing, engineer, keyboards, producer, programming
- Dave Curran — bass
- Hope Darst — primary artist, background vocals
- Austin Davis — drums, percussion, programming
- Connor Dwyer — design
- Rachel Dwyer — design
- Taylor Johnson — acoustic guitar, electric guitar
- Elizabeth Lamb — viola
- Jeremy Larson — cello, string arrangements, strings, viola, violin
- Tim Lauer — keyboards, programmer, programming
- Joe LePorta — cello, mastering, string arrangements, viola, violin
- Robert Marvin — programming
- Brenton Miles — engineer
- Sean Moffitt — engineer, mixing
- David Ramirez — programming
- James Rueger — A&R
- Jonathan Smith — acoustic guitar, background vocals, bass, electric guitar, keyboards, organ, piano, producer, programming
- Jacob Sooter — piano
- Matt Stanfield — keyboards, piano, programming, synthesizer

== Charts ==
=== Weekly charts ===
Weekly chart performance for Peace Be Still
Chart (2020)	Peak position
US Christian Albums (Billboard)	23

=== Year-end charts ===
Year-end chart performance for Peace Be Still
Chart (2020)	Position
US Christian Albums (Billboard)	100

== Release history ==
Release history and formats for Hymn of Heaven
Region	Date	Format(s)	Label(s)	Ref.
Various	August 21, 2020	Digital download; streaming	Fair Trade Services; Columbia	
