= Like You Love Me =

2019 single by Tauren Wells

Single by Tauren Wells

from the album Citizen of Heaven
- Released: December 13, 2019
- Recorded: 2019
- Studio: The Studio, Franklin, TN
- Genre: CCM
- Length: 3:30
- Label: Provident Label Group
- Songwriters: Chuck Butler; Jordan Sapp; Tauren Wells
- Producers: Chuck Butler; Jordan Sapp

Tauren Wells singles chronology
"God's Not Done with You" (2019)	"Like You Love Me" (2019)	"Famous For (I Believe)" (2020)

Music videos
- "Like You Love Me" on YouTube
- "Like You Love Me" (Lyrics) on YouTube

"Like You Love Me" is a song by American Christian pop artist Tauren Wells. It was released on December 13, 2019, as the lead single from his sophomore studio album, Citizen of Heaven (2020). Wells co-wrote the song with Chuck Butler, and Jordan Sapp. Chuck Butler collaborated with Jordan Sapp on producing the single. The song peaked at No. 17 on the US Hot Christian Songs chart.

== Background ==
"Like You Love Me" was initially released by Tauren Wells as the fourth promotional single to the album, Citizen of Heaven(2020), on November 29, 2019. The song impacted Christian radio in the United States on December 13, 2019, as the first official single from the album.

== Composition ==
"Like You Love Me" is composed in the key of E-flat major with a tempo of 111 beats per minute.

== Commercial performance ==
In the United States, the song debuted at No. 42 on Billboard's Hot Christian Songs chart, and at No. 30 on the Christian Airplay chart, all dated January 6, 2020. Following the release of Citizen of Heaven, the song surged to No. 19 and No. 15 on Hot Christian Songs and Christian Airplay charts respectively, owing to significant gains in streaming and radio play. The song went on to peak at No. 17 on Hot Christian Songs, and No. 14 on Christian Airplay.

== Music videos ==
On November 29, 2019, Tauren Wells published the official lyric video of "Like You Love Me" on YouTube. On December 13, 2019, Wells released the official music video of the song.

== Charts ==
=== Weekly charts ===
Weekly chart performance for "Like You Love Me"
Chart (2019–20)	Peak position
US Hot Christian Songs (Billboard)	17
US Christian Airplay (Billboard)	14
US Christian AC (Billboard)	11

=== Year-end charts ===
Year-end chart performance for "Like You Love Me"
Chart (2020)	Position
US Christian Songs (Billboard)	50
US Christian Airplay (Billboard)	38
US Christian AC (Billboard)	38

== Release history ==
Region	Date	Format	Label	Ref.
Various	November 29, 2019	Digital download; streaming; (Promotional release)	Provident Label Group	
United States	June 26, 2020	Christian radio	Provident Label Group	
