= The Belonging Co =

American contemporary worship band

- Origin: Nashville, Tennessee, US
- Genres: Contemporary worship music
- Years active: 2017–present
- Label: TBCO
- Members: Henry Seeley; Natalie Grant; David Dennis; Sarah Reeves; Mia Fieldes; Lauren Sloat; Andrew Holt; Mitch Wong; Hope Darst; Jessie Early; Shantrice Laura; Danny Gokey
- Past members: Kari Jobe; Cody Carnes; Lauren Daigle; Meredith Andrews; Maggie Reed; Ben Cantelon; Daniella Mason
- Website: thebelonging.co/worship

The Belonging Co is a contemporary worship music band founded by Henry Seeley, originating from the Belonging Co church in Nashville, Tennessee. The collective has released seven live albums, All the Earth (2017), Awe + Wonder (2019), See the Light (2021), Here (2022), Now (2022), PNEUMA (2023) and Eden (2025).

== History ==
The Belonging Co made its debut in 2017, releasing its first live album, All the Earth, on September 8, 2017. The album debuted on Billboard's Top Christian Albums chart at number two, having sold 3,000 equivalent album units in its first week of sales. The promotional single, "Peace Be Still", featuring Lauren Daigle, debuted at number 35 on the US Hot Christian Songs and spent a total of five weeks on the chart.

On March 23, 2018, the Belonging Co released "Isn't He (This Jesus)", featuring Natalie Grant, as its first career single. The song debuted at number 27 on the US Hot Christian Songs chart and spent two weeks there. On September 9, 2019, the Belonging Co released "Hosanna", featuring Kari Jobe, as the first promotional single from its second live album, Awe + Wonder, slated for release on September 13. Awe + Wonder was released on September 13, 2019. The album debuted at number 38 on the Top Christian Albums chart.

On March 27, 2020, the Belonging Co released "Holy (Song of the Ages)" featuring Andrew Holt, as a single. On February 5, 2021, The Belonging Co released "Every Victory" featuring Danny Gokey as a single. "Every Victory" peaked at number 29 on the US Hot Christian Songs Chart. On March 5, 2021, the Belonging Co released "Turn Your Eyes" featuring Natalie Grant as a single. On April 2, 2021, the Belonging Co released "The Truth" featuring Lauren Strahm and Andrew Holt as a single. On May 7, 2021, the Belonging Co released "War Cry" featuring Henry Seeley as the first promotional single from See the Light, its third live album was slated for release on May 21. On May 14, 2021, the Belonging Co released "Eyes on You" featuring Sarah Reeves as the second promotional single from See the Light. See the Light was released on May 21, 2021.

== Members ==
The members of the Belonging Co include the following:

- Cody Carnes
- Kari Jobe
- Natalie Grant
- Mia Fieldes
- Meredith Andrews
- Andrew Holt
- Hope Darst
- Daniella Mason
- Maggie Reed
- Lauren Strahm
- Sarah Reeves
- Henry Seeley
- Danny Gokey

== Discography ==
=== Live albums ===
List of albums, with selected chart positions
Title	Album details	Peak chart positions		
Title	Album details	US	US Christ.	US Indie
All the Earth	Debut album; Released: September 8, 2017; Label: TBCO Music; Format: Digital download, streaming	— (Note: All the Earth did not enter the Billboard 200 chart, but peaked at number 70 on the Top Album Sales chart and number 64 on the Top Current Albums chart.)	2	20
Awe + Wonder	Released: September 13, 2019; Label: TBCO Music; Format: Digital download, streaming	—	38	—
See the Light	Released: May 21, 2021; Label: TBCO Music; Format: Digital download, streaming	—	—	—
Here	Released: March 25, 2022; Label: TBCO Music; Format: Digital download, streaming	—	—	—
Now	Released: June 3, 2022; Label: TBCO Music; Format: Digital download, streaming	—	—	—
PNEUMA	Released: September 15, 2023; Label: TBCO Music; Format: Digital download, streaming	—	—	—
Eden	Released: February 28, 2025; Label: TBCO Music; Format: Digital download, streaming	—	—	—
"—" denotes a recording that did not chart or was not released in that territory.

=== Singles ===
List of singles and peak chart positions
Title	Year	Peak positions			Album
Title	Year	US Christ	Christ Air.	Christ Digital	Album
"Isn't He (This Jesus)" (featuring Natalie Grant)	2018	27	—	7	Awe + Wonder
"Holy (Song of the Ages)" (featuring Andrew Holt)	2020	—	—	—	See the Light
"Every Victory" (featuring Danny Gokey)	2021	29	—	15	See the Light
"Turn Your Eyes" (featuring Natalie Grant)	2021	—	—	—	See the Light
"The Truth" (featuring Lauren Strahm and Andrew Holt)	2021	—	—	—	See the Light
"La Victoria" (with Danny Gokey)	2021	—	—	—	Non-album single
"Jesus Over Everything" (with Andrew Holt)	2021	—	48	—	See the Light
"The Dove" (with Kari Jobe)	2022	46	—	—	PNEUMA
"Mighty Name Of Jesus" (featuring Hope Darst)	2024	32	—	—	TBD
"This Place" (featuring Natalie Grant)	2024	—	—	—	TBD
"—" denotes a recording that did not chart.

=== Promotional singles ===
List of singles and peak chart positions
Title	Year	Peak positions		Album
Title	Year	US Christ	Christ Digital	Album
"Peace Be Still" (featuring Lauren Daigle)	2017	35	25	All the Earth
"Hosanna" (featuring Kari Jobe)	2019	—	—	Awe + Wonder
"War Cry" (featuring Henry Seeley)	2021	—	—	See the Light
"Eyes on You" (featuring Sarah Reeves)	2021	—	—	See the Light
"Because of Christ" (with Henry Seeley)	2022	—	—	Here
"Everything Is Changing" (with Shantrice Laura)	2022	—	—	Here
"Firm Foundation (He Won't)" (with Cody Carnes)	2022	—	—	Here
"This Is Freedom (Ain't No Rock)" (with Natalie Grant)	2022	—	—	Now
"Rise and Shine" (with Mitch Wong)	2022	—	—	Now
"This Far" (with David Dennis)	2022	—	—	Now
"—" denotes a recording that did not chart.

== See also ==
- List of Christian worship music artists
