= Until Grace =

2020 song by Tauren Wells and Rascal Flatts

Single by Tauren Wells and Rascal Flatts

from the album Citizen of Heaven
- Released: February 14, 2020
- Recorded: 2019
- Studio: The Studio, Franklin, Tennessee
- Genre: CCM
- Length: 3:36
- Label: Provident Label Group
- Songwriters: Chuck Butler; Ethan Hulse; Tauren Wells

Tauren Wells singles chronology
"Famous For (I Believe)" (2020)	"Until Grace" (2020)	"Millionaire (Good Like That)" (2020)

Rascal Flatts singles chronology
"Back to Life" (2018)	"Until Grace" (2020)	"How They Remember You" (2020)

Music videos
- "Until Grace" (Live) on YouTube
- "Until Grace" (Lyrics) on YouTube

"Until Grace" is a song performed by American Christian pop artist Tauren Wells and American country music group Rascal Flatts. It was released on February 14, 2020, as the third single from Wells' second studio album, Citizen of Heaven (2020). Wells co-wrote the song with Chuck Butler and Ethan Hulse.

"Until Grace" peaked at No. 11 on the US Hot Christian Songs chart.

== Background ==
On February 14, 2020, Tauren Wells released "Until Grace" with Rascal Flatts as the third single from his second studio album, Citizen of Heaven on digital platforms. On April 5, 2021, the radio team of Provident Label Group announced that it will be serviced to Christian radio in the United States, the official add date for the single slated on April 30. On April 9, 2021, Wells released a live version featuring Gary LeVox of Rascal Flatts as a promotional single in the lead-up to the release of his first live album, Citizen of Heaven (Live) (2021).

== Composition ==
The song is composed in the key of F-sharp major with a tempo of 145 beats per minute.

== Commercial performance ==
Following the official release of "Until Grace" on Christian radio, the song debuted on the US Christian Airplay chart dated May 8, 2021, at number 46. The song debuted at No. 31 on the US Hot Christian Songs chart dated May 29, 2021.

== Music videos ==
Tauren Wells released the official visualizer on January 24, 2020. On April 9, 2021, Wells released an official live performance video that shows Wells singing alongside Gary LeVox was filmed at Lakewood Church in Houston, Texas. On April 16, 2021, Wells released an audio video live version on YouTube. On April 23, 2021, Tauren Wells published an official lyric video YouTube.

"Until Grace"
No.	Title	Length
1.	"Until Grace" (with Rascal Flatts)	3:36

"Until Grace" (Tauren Wells solo)
No.	Title	Length
1.	"Until Grace"	3:36

== Charts ==
=== Weekly charts ===
Weekly chart performance for "Until Grace"
Chart (2020–2021)	Peak position
US Hot Christian Songs (Billboard)	11
US Christian Airplay (Billboard)	7
US Christian AC (Billboard)	8

=== Year-end charts ===
Year-end chart performance for "Until Grace"
Chart (2021)	Position
US Christian Songs (Billboard)	33
US Christian Airplay (Billboard)	22
US Christian AC (Billboard)	27

== Release history ==
Region	Date	Version	Format	Label	Ref.
Various	Original (with Rascal Flatts)	February 14, 2020	Digital download; streaming	Provident Label Group	
United States	Original (with Rascal Flatts)	April 30, 2021	Christian radio	Provident Label Group	
Various	Tauren Wells solo	August 6, 2021	Digital download; streaming	Provident Label Group	
