= Isn't He (This Jesus) =

2018 song by The Belonging Co

Single by The Belonging Co featuring Natalie Grant

from the album Awe + Wonder
- Released: March 23, 2018
- Genre: Contemporary worship music
- Length: 9:50
- Label: TBCO Music
- Songwriter(s): Andrew Holt; Mia Fieldes; Natalie Grant; Seth Mosley
- Producer(s): Henry Seeley

The Belonging Co singles chronology
"Isn't He (This Jesus)" (2018)	"Holy (Song of the Ages)" (2021)

Natalie Grant singles chronology
"More Than Anything" (2018)	"Isn't He (This Jesus)" (2020)	"The Prayer" (2018)

Music video
- "Isn't He (This Jesus)" on YouTube

"Isn't He (This Jesus)" is a song performed by Nashville-based contemporary worship band The Belonging Co featuring American singer Natalie Grant, which was released on March 23, 2018, as the lead single from The Belonging Co's second live album, Awe + Wonder (2019). The song was written by Andrew Holt, Mia Fieldes, Natalie Grant, and Seth Mosley. The single was produced by Henry Seeley.

"Isn't He (This Jesus)" peaked at No. 27 on the US Hot Christian Songs chart.

== Background ==
On March 23, 2018, The Belonging Co released "Isn't He (This Jesus)" featuring Natalie Grant as a single.

== Composition ==
"Isn't He (This Jesus)" is composed in the key of A♭ with a tempo of 72 beats per minute and a musical time signature of 4/4.

== Commercial performance ==
"Isn't He (This Jesus)" debuted at No. 27 on the US Hot Christian Songs chart dated April 7, 2018, concurrently charting at No. 7 on the Christian Digital Song Sales chart. It spent a total of two weeks on Hot Christian Songs Chart.

== Music video ==
On March 23, 2018, The Belonging Co released the official music video for "Isn't He (This Jesus)" featuring Natalie Grant leading the song live at The Belonging Co Conference in Nashville, Tennessee.

== Charts ==
Chart performance for "Isn't He (This Jesus)"
Chart (2021)	Peak position
US Christian Songs (Billboard)	27

== Release history ==
Release history for "Isn't He (This Jesus)"
Region	Date	Format	Label	Ref.
Various	March 23, 2018	Digital download; streaming	TBCO Music	
