= Promise Keeper =

2020 song by Hope Darst

Single by Hope Darst

from the album Peace Be Still
- Released: December 26, 2020
- Recorded: 2020
- Genre: Contemporary worship music
- Length: 5:00
- Label: Fair Trade Services
- Songwriters: Ethan Hulse; Jonathan Smith; Hope Darst
- Producers: Jonathan Smith; Max Corwin

Hope Darst singles chronology
"Peace Be Still" (2020)	"Promise Keeper" (2020)

Music video
- "Promise Keeper" (Lyrics) on YouTube

"Promise Keeper" is a song performed by American contemporary Christian singer Hope Darst. The song was released to Christian radio in the United States on December 26, 2020, as the second single from her debut studio album, Peace Be Still (2020). Darst co-wrote the song with Andrew Holt and Mia Fieldes. Jonathan Smith produced the single.

"Promise Keeper" peaked at No. 26 on the US Hot Christian Songs chart. "Promise Keeper" received a nomination for the GMA Dove Award Inspirational Recorded Song of the Year at the 2021 GMA Dove Awards.

== Background ==
Hope Darst initially released "Promise Keeper" alongside the song "Set Free" as the promotional singles in the lead-up to the release of her debut studio album, Peace Be Still (2020), on July 10, 2020. On November 6, 2020, the radio team of Fair Trade Services announced that "Promise Keeper" will be serviced to Christian radio in the United States, the official add date for the single slated on December 26, 2020. Darst shared the story behind the song, saying:

"Promise Keeper" is one of my favorite songs because it holds truths that I deeply believe and live by: our God is a promise keeper and His word never fails. I haven’t always been so confident of this, and those were the seasons when I had to dig deep to figure out what I believed.

My life alone, the journey of the record, is truly a picture of God keeping His promises. I felt like God told me when I was a young girl that I would be a singer and make albums. But, just like life, there were a lot of twists and turns, and things didn’t go as I had planned.

Twice, I attempted to pursue a career as a recording artist. God shut these attempts down and redirected my steps. Both times were filled with disappointment, but the fear of being disobedient was always stronger. I did what God asked and, in those moments of obedience, I experienced the goodness of God in ways I didn’t expect: left turns that felt like missteps constantly turned into places of healing, freedom, restoration, revelation, and confidence.

== Composition ==
"Promise Keeper" is composed in the key of F with a tempo of 77.6 beats per minute and a musical time signature of 4/4.

== Accolades ==
Awards
Year	Organization	Award	Result	Ref
2021	GMA Dove Awards	Inspirational Recorded Song of the Year	Nominated	

== Music videos ==
The official lyric video of "Promise Keeper" was published on Hope Darst's YouTube channel on July 10, 2020. The official audio video of the song was published on YouTube on July 15, 2020.

== Charts ==
Weekly chart performance for "Promise Keeper"
Chart (2020–2021)	Peak position
US Christian Songs (Billboard)	26
US Christian Airplay (Billboard)	22
US Christian AC (Billboard)	21

== Release history ==
Release history and formats for "Promise Keeper"
Region	Date	Format	Label	Ref.
Various	July 10, 2020	Digital download (promotional release); streaming (promotional release)	Fair Trade Services	
United States	December 26, 2020	Christian radio	Fair Trade Services	
