= Svrcina (singer) =

- Also known as: Molly Hunt
- Born: Molly Marie Svrcina; April 14, 1996 (age 30); Dearborn, Michigan
- Origin: Nashville, Tennessee
- Genres: Pop, EDM
- Occupations: Singer, songwriter
- Instrument: Vocals
- Years active: 2009–present
- Website: svrcina.com

Molly Marie Svrcina (sur-CEE-nah; born April 14, 1996), known professionally as Svrcina (stylized in all caps) and previously Molly Hunt, is an American singer-songwriter. At the age of 13, she became the youngest female musical artist to sign a publishing deal for songwriting, beating previous record holder Taylor Swift. Two years later, she became the youngest contestant to win first prize in the USA Songwriting Competition. By the age of 17, she had won or placed in nine international songwriting competitions. She has written more than 700 songs.

== Early life and career beginnings ==
Molly Svrcina was born on April 14, 1996, in Dearborn, Michigan. She started singing in church at the age of six and began performing around the Midwest at the age of 10, eventually getting noticed by Ann Wilson of AWMG Music Group at a karaoke competition. She was set up with writers at the age of 11 and signed her first publishing deal in 2009 at the age of 13, becoming the youngest female musical artist to ever do so.

Svrcina moved to Nashville at the age of 14 to pursue her music career and performed under the stage name Molly Hunt. At the age of 15, she entered the 2011 USA Songwriting competition with her song "Go There" and won first place in the country category, becoming the youngest contestant to win first place in any category, and third place overall. That same year, she competed on season 11 of American Idol, advancing to the Hollywood round and finishing in the top 60. To balance her music career and education, she attended the online school James Madison High School for her last two years of high school. For college, she attended Liberty University with a degree in International Business and Management.

== Career ==
=== 2014–2018: Lover. Fighter and Svrcina ===
On October 9, 2014, Svrcina released her debut single, "Compass", featuring Matt Bubel. In an interview with Celeb Mix, she explained that the lead singer of Built By Titan, whom she collaborated with on "The Darkness" in 2015, encouraged her to make her family name, Svrcina, her stage name. Her debut EP, Lover. Fighter, came out in 2016.

In preparation for her debut album, Svrcina released a series of singles throughout 2016 and 2017, including "Island", "Astronomical", and "Steady". The final single for her upcoming debut album, "Whispers", was written while on a writing session in London using inspiration from her study abroad trip to China. On March 23, 2018, she released her self-titled debut album, Svrcina, which Nashville Unsigned described as "a perfect balance of uptempo EDM tracks and graceful, slower pop tracks highlighting Svrcina’s vocals".

=== 2018–2020: Hearing Colour and Elysian Fields ===
In 2018, Svrcina moved to Berlin, Germany, for three months "to explore musical inspirations from different parts of the globe" and released "Come Together" as the first single off her upcoming album. In 2019, she co-wrote "Sink Deeper" by Moti featuring Icona Pop. On June 14, 2019, she released her sophomore album, Hearing Colour, which garnered 1 million streams within three weeks.

On September 25, 2020, Svrcina released her first full-length album, Elysian Fields. In December 2020, the album was featured in Rolling Stone magazine's list of underrated 2020 albums, in which writer Andrew Firriolo called it "an excellent indie pop set that seamlessly weaves strong production, incredible vocals, and emotional lyricism". Firriolo also listed Elysian Fields as his second-favorite album of 2020.

=== 2021–present: Orchards and 1200 Beats Per Minute ===
In January 2021, Svrcina collaborated with Tommee Profitt and Tauren Wells on "O Holy Night", which peaked at number 34 on the Billboard Hot Christian Songs chart. She collaborated with rappers Hulvey and Lecrae on "Reasons" in April 2021 and received a nomination for Rap/Hip-Hop Recorded Song of the Year at the 52nd GMA Dove Awards. On September 22, 2021, she partnered with Jackpot Candles and announced her fourth album, Orchards, which was released exactly a month later.

In 2023, Svrcina's songs "Something Beautiful" and "Next Generation" ranked within the top 10 most-played songs on Australian Christian radio. On September 13, 2024, she released her fifth album, 1200 Beats Per Minute, the title of which references the speed of a hummingbird's heartbeat. To promote the album, she opened for Jeremy Camp in 2024 and Danny Gokey's Sound of Heaven Tour in 2025.

== Cultural influence ==
In March 2025, Svrcina joined Destiny Rescue's Give Up a Meal campaign, which "encourages Australians to donate the cost of a single meal to fund rescue missions and post-rescue care for vulnerable children".
