= How They Remember You =

Single by Rascal Flatts

from the EP How They Remember You
- Released: June 19, 2020
- Genre: Country
- Length: 3:37
- Label: Big Machine
- Songwriters: Marc Beeson; Josh Osborne; Allen Shamblin
- Producers: Dann Huff; Rascal Flatts

Rascal Flatts singles chronology
"Until Grace" (2020)	"How They Remember You" (2020)	"I Dare You" (2025)

"How They Remember You" is a song written by Marc Beeson, Josh Osborne, and Allen Shamblin, and recorded by American country music group Rascal Flatts. It is the lone single from their 2020 extended play of the same name. This was the last single the group released in their career before their breakup in October 2021 and subsequent reformation three years later.

== History ==
Marc Beeson, Josh Osborne, and Allen Shamblin wrote the song. According to group member Jay DeMarcus, the song is "a timeless message that will inspire people, and it's about what kind of mark you leave behind when you leave this world". Shamblin had previously written the band's 2009 single "Why".

On July 30, 2020, Rascal Flatts released a digital extended play which included "How They Remember You", a cover of Kenny Rogers' 1981 hit "Through the Years", and five other cuts. The group also released a lyric video that same month, featuring pictures submitted by fans.

== Charts ==
=== Weekly charts ===
Chart (2020–2021)	Peak position
Canada Country (Billboard)	33
US Billboard Hot 100	89
US Country Airplay (Billboard)	4
US Hot Country Songs (Billboard)	18

=== Year-end charts ===
Chart (2021)	Position
US Country Airplay (Billboard)	32
US Hot Country Songs (Billboard)	67
