= Hope Darst =

American Christian musician

- Born: Hope Darst; December 3, 1980 (age 45)
- Origin: Nashville, Tennessee, U.S.
- Genres: Contemporary worship music; CCM
- Occupations: Singer; songwriter
- Instrument: Vocals
- Years active: 2003–present
- Label: Fair Trade Services
- Website: Official website

Hope Darst (born December 3, 1980) is an American Christian musician and songwriter. Darst made her debut in 2020 with the release of her debut studio album, Peace Be Still (2020), containing the singles "Peace Be Still" and "Promise Keeper", which debuted at number 23 on the Top Christian Albums Chart in the United States. "Peace Be Still" was her breakout hit single and it peaked at number six on Billboard's Hot Christian Songs chart. In 2021, Darst received three nominations at the 52nd GMA Dove Awards, being nominated for New Artist of the Year, Inspirational Recorded Song of the Year for "Promise Keeper", and Worship Recorded Song of the Year for "Peace Be Still".

== Career ==
On February 7, 2020, Darst released her debut single "Peace Be Still", with Fair Trade Services announcing that they signed a record deal with her and had added her to their roster. "Peace Be Still" became her breakout single, debuting at number six on Billboard's Hot Christian Songs chart. Darst released her debut studio album, Peace Be Still, on August 21, 2020. Peace Be Still debuted at number 23 on the Top Christian Albums Chart. On December 26, 2020, Darst released her second single, "Promise Keeper", to Christian radio in the United States. "Promise Keeper" reached number 26 on the Hot Christian Songs chart.

She received three nominations at the 2021 GMA Dove Awards in the categories of New Artist of the Year, Worship Recorded Song of the Year for "Peace Be Still", and Inspirational Recorded Song of the Year for "Promise Keeper".

== Personal life ==
Hope Darst lives in Nashville with her husband David Darst, and their two daughters. She is part of The Belonging Co(mpany) church where she is a worship leader. She has been featured on several of their albums “All The Earth”, “Awe & Wonder”, “See the Light”, and “Here”.

== Discography ==
=== Albums ===
List of studio albums, with selected chart positions
Title	Album details	Peak chart positions
Title	Album details	US Christ
Peace Be Still	Released: August 21, 2020; Label: Fair Trade; Format: CD, digital download, streaming	23
"—" denotes a recording that did not chart

=== Live albums ===
List of extended plays
Title	Details
In the Mighty Name	Released: April 18, 2025; Label: Fair Trade; Format: CD, digital download, streaming

=== EPs ===
List of extended plays
Title	EP details
If the Lord Builds the House	Released: November 4, 2022; Label: Fair Trade; Format: Digital download, streaming
You Can	Released: January 31, 2025; Label: Fair Trade; Format: Digital download, streaming

=== Singles ===
==== As lead artist ====
List of singles and peak chart positions
Title	Year	Peak hart positions				Certifications	Album
Title	Year	US Christ	US Christ Air	US Christ AC	US Christ Digital	Certifications	Album
"Peace Be Still"	2020	6	6	5	7	RIAA: Gold	Peace Be Still
"Promise Keeper"	2020	26	22	21	—		Peace Be Still
"If the Lord Builds the House"	2022	16	20	17	—		If the Lord Builds the House (EP)
"Burial" (with Mitch Wong)	2023	—	—	—	—		Non-album single
"Never Walk Alone"	2023	—	—	—	—		If the Lord Builds the House (EP)
"Hands of the Healer"	2024	—	—	—	—		You Can (EP)
"The Blood of Jesus"	2024	—	—	—	—		You Can (EP)
"What the Lord Has Done"	2024	—	—	—	—		You Can (EP)
"Mighty Name of Jesus" (original or with Josh Baldwin)	2025	10	3	5	—		In the Mighty Name
"Be Born In Me"	2025	—	26	16	—		Non-album single
"—" denotes a recording that did not chart

==== As featured artist ====
List of featured singles
Song	Year	Album
"I Won't Forget" (Lifepoint Worship featuring Hope Darst)	2022	Non-album single

=== Promotional singles ===
List of promotional singles
Song	Year	Album
"Set Free"	2020	Peace Be Still
"Give You the Glory" (featuring David Leonard)	2022	If the Lord Builds the House (EP)
"Give Me Jesus"	2025	In the Mighty Name

=== Other appearances ===
Song	Year	Album	Ref.
"I Surrender All" (Daniel Kolenda and Hope Darst)	2016	Holy Ground Live with Daniel Kolenda	
"Here in Your Love" (The Belonging Co featuring Hope Darst)	2017	All the Earth	
"Better" (Mateo Palmitier featuring Hope Darst)	2019	Not the End (EP)	
"Breakthrough" (The Belonging Co featuring Hope Darst)	2019	Awe + Wonder	
"Love Like This" (The Belonging Co featuring Hope Darst)	2019	Awe + Wonder	
"Where Would I Be" (The Belonging Co and Hope Darst)	2021	See the Light	
"Come Alive (Resurrection Power)" (The Belonging Co and Hope Darst)	2022	Here	
"No Turning Back" (The Belonging Co and Hope Darst)	2022	Here	

== Awards and nominations ==
=== GMA Dove Awards ===
Year	Nominee / work	Award	Result	Ref.
2021	Hope Darst	New Artist of the Year	Nominated	
2021	"Promise Keeper"	Inspirational Recorded Song of the Year	Nominated	
2021	"Peace Be Still"	Worship Recorded Song of the Year	Nominated	
2026	"Mighty Name of Jesus"	Song of the Year	Pending	
2026	"Mighty Name of Jesus"	Worship Recorded Song of the Year	Pending	

=== K-Love Fan Awards ===
Year	Nominee / work	Award	Result	Ref.
2026	"Might Name of Jesus"	Worship Song of the Year	Nominated	
2026	Herself	Female Artist of the Year	Nominated	

=== We Love Awards ===
Year	Nominee / work	Award	Result	Ref.
2025	"Mighty Name of Jesus"	Worship Song of the Year	Nominated	
