= Voice of God (song) =

2020 song by Dante Bowe

Single by Dante Bowe featuring Steffany Gretzinger and Chandler Moore
- Released: September 30, 2020
- Recorded: 2020
- Genre: Contemporary worship music
- Length: 11:43
- Label: Bethel Music
- Songwriter(s): Dante Bowe; Jeff Schneeweis; Mitch Wong; Tywan Mack
- Producer(s): Tywan Mack; Dante Bowe

Dante Bowe singles chronology
"Be Alright" (2020)	"Voice of God" (2020)	"Joyful" (2021)

Steffany Gretzinger singles chronology
"Good & Loved" (2019)	"Voice of God" (2020)	"Hosanna" (2020)

Chandler Moore singles chronology
"Man of Your Word" (2020)	"Voice of God" (2020)	"He Always Provides" (2020)

Music video
- "Voice of God" on YouTube

"Voice of God" is a song by Dante Bowe, which was released as a standalone single, on September 30, 2020. The song features vocals from Steffany Gretzinger and Chandler Moore. Bowe co-wrote the song with Jeff Schneeweis, Mitch Wong, and Tywan Mack. Bowe and Tywan Mack handled the production of the single.

"Voice of God" peaked at No. 36 on the US Hot Christian Songs chart. "Voice of God" was nominated for the GMA Dove Award Gospel Worship Recorded Song of the Year at the 2021 GMA Dove Awards. It was nominated for the Grammy Award for Best Gospel Performance/Song at the 2022 Grammy Awards.

== Background ==
Dante Bowe shared the message behind the song on his social media, saying:

There’s no sweeter sound than the sound of His voice. His voice is life. His voice is home. It’s the voice that holds all things together. It’s a constant in the midst of change and unknown. It’s comfort in the midst of heartache and hurting. It’s the voice that never stops speaking. All that’s required of us is to sit still and listen. Lean into it. Because the more you lean into it, the more you’ll know it.

== Composition ==
"Voice of God" is composed in the key of C with a tempo of 80 beats per minute and a musical time signature of 4/4.

== Accolades ==
Awards
Year	Organization	Award	Result	Ref
2021	GMA Dove Awards	Gospel Worship Recorded Song of the Year	Nominated	
2022	Grammy Awards	Best Gospel Performance/Song	Nominated	

== Commercial performance ==
"Voice of God" debuted at number 36 on the US Hot Christian Songs chart, and at number 22 on the Christian Digital Song Sales chart.

== Music video ==
Dante Bowe released the music video of "Voice of God" via YouTube on September 30, 2020. The video showcases Bowe, Steffany Gretzinger and Chandler Moore singing together.

== Track listing ==
"Voice of God"
No.	Title	Length
1.	"Voice of God" (featuring Steffany Gretzinger and Chandler Moore)	11:43

"Voice of God" Apple Music EP bonus video content
No.	Title	Length
2.	"Voice of God" (featuring Steffany Gretzinger and Chandler Moore)	11:44

== Charts ==
Chart (2020)	Peak position
US Christian Songs (Billboard)	36

== Release history ==
Region	Date	Version	Format	Label	Ref.
Various	September 30, 2020	Single	Digital download; streaming	Bethel Music	
Various	October 16, 2020	EP (Apple Music exclusive)	Digital download; streaming	Bethel Music	
