= Every Victory =

2021 song by The Belonging Co and Danny Gokey

Single by The Belonging Co and Danny Gokey

from the album See the Light
- Released: February 5, 2021
- Genre: Contemporary worship music
- Length: 8:47
- Label: TBCO Music
- Songwriter(s): Andrew Holt; Ben Cantelon; Danny Gokey; Josh Silverberg; Kari Jobe; Mitch Wong
- Producer(s): Henry Seeley; Austin Davis

The Belonging Co singles chronology
"Holy (Song of the Ages)" (2020)	"Every Victory" (2021)	"Turn Your Eyes" (2021)

Danny Gokey singles chronology
"New Day" (2021)	"Every Victory" (2020)	"We All Need Jesus" (2021)

Music video
- "Every Victory" on YouTube

"Every Victory" is a song performed by Nashville-based contemporary worship band The Belonging Co and American singer Danny Gokey, which was released on February 5, 2021, as the second single from The Belonging Co's third live album, See the Light (2021). The song was written by Andrew Holt, Ben Cantelon, Danny Gokey, Josh Silverberg, Kari Jobe, Mitch Wong. The single was produced by Henry Seeley and Austin Davis.

"Every Victory" peaked at No. 29 on the US Hot Christian Songs chart.

== Background ==
On February 5, 2021, The Belonging Co released "Every Victory" alongside Danny Gokey as a single. The Belonging Co described the song as "a bold declaration that we are not fighting for victory, we are worshipping from a place of victory."

== Composition ==
"Every Victory" is composed in the key of E♭ with a tempo of 70 beats per minute and a musical time signature of 4/4.

== Commercial performance ==
"Every Victory" debuted at No. 40 on the US Hot Christian Songs chart dated February 20, 2021, concurrently charting at No. 25 on the Christian Digital Song Sales chart. It went on to peak at No. 29 on the Hot Christian Songs chart, and spent a total of three non-consecutive weeks on Hot Christian Songs Chart.

== Music video ==
On February 5, 2021, The Belonging Co released the official music video for "Every Victory" featuring Danny Gokey leading the song live at The Belonging Co Conference in Nashville, Tennessee.

== Personnel ==
Adapted from AllMusic.

- The Belonging Co – primary artist
- Austin Davis – producer
- Sam Gibson – mastering engineer, mixing
- Danny Gokey – primary artist, vocals
- Henry Seeley – producer

== Charts ==
Chart performance for "Every Victory"
Chart (2021)	Peak position
US Hot Christian Songs (Billboard)	29

== Release history ==
Release history for "Every Victory"
Region	Date	Format	Label	Ref.
Various	February 5, 2021	Digital download; streaming	TBCO Music	
