= Sweet Sweet Sound =

EP by Sarah Reeves
- Released: April 21, 2009
- Genres: Worship, contemporary Christian music
- Length: 22:28
- Label: Sparrow
- Producers: Matt Bronleewe, Ed Cash, Ian Eskelin

Sarah Reeves chronology
Sweet Sweet Sound (2009)	God of the Impossible (2010)

Sweet Sweet Sound is the first extended play from Sarah Reeves. Sparrow Records released the EP on April 21, 2009. Reeves worked with Matt Bronleewe, Ed Cash, Ian Eskelin, in the production of this album.

== Critical reception ==
Professional ratings
Review scores
Source	Rating
Cross Rhythms	9/10 squares
Jesus Freak Hideout	3.5/5 stars
New Release Today	4/5 stars
The Phantom Tollbooth	4/5

Indicating in a nine out of ten from Cross Rhythms, Stephen Luff says, "is the start of something very special." Ben Cardenas, rating the EP three and a half stars for Jesus Freak Hideout, writes, "She has extensive talent and is creative and true in her style." Awarding the EP four stars by New Release Today, Kevin Davis describes, "Great debut album...very impressed by Sarah’s singing and songwriting". Michael Dalton, giving the EP a four out of five at The Phantom Tollbooth, states, "This debut is well-crafted and appealing. It sounds modern and fresh."

== Track listing ==
No.	Title	Writer(s)	Length
1.	"These Words of Mine (Intro)"	Jeremy Bose, Sarah Reeves	0:28
2.	"Fresh Anointing"	Scott Davis, Reeves	3:29
3.	"Awaken"	Bose, Sarah Hart, Reeves	3:42
4.	"Sweet Sweet Sound"	Ed Cash, Reeves	3:09
5.	"Come Save"	Bose, Reeves	4:03
6.	"Let Us Rise"	Cash, Reeves	3:53
7.	"My Savior"	Matt Bronleewe, Reeves	3:44
Total length:			22:28

== Chart performance ==
Chart (2015)	Peak position
US Top Christian Albums (Billboard)	19
US Heatseekers Albums (Billboard)	8
