= Back to Life (Rascal Flatts song) =

Single by Rascal Flatts
- Released: September 28, 2018
- Genre: Country
- Length: 3:34
- Label: Big Machine
- Songwriters: Cary Barlowe; Niko Moon; Fred Wilhelm; Shay Mooney
- Producer: Rascal Flatts

Rascal Flatts singles chronology
"Back to Us" (2017)	"Back to Life" (2018)	"Until Grace" (2020)

"Back to Life" is a song recorded by American country music group Rascal Flatts. It is their 39th single release overall, and its release is intended to be a standalone single, as opposed to their previous singles which were all included on studio albums. Cary Barlowe, Niko Moon, Shay Mooney, and Fred Wilhelm are the song's writers.

== History ==
"Back to Life" was written by Cary Barlowe, Fred Wilhelm, Dan + Shay member Shay Mooney, and Sir Rosevelt member Niko Moon. The song is similar to many previous Rascal Flatts singles such as "Easy" and "Come Wake Me Up" by being a ballad with a 6/8 time signature. Rascal Flatts produced the song by themselves. Mooney said that the decision for Rascal Flatts to record the song came after they had been on tour with Dan + Shay.

Rolling Stone Country writer Jon Freeman said of the song that " glides on a gently swinging rhythm and lists a series of reasons large and small that create a sense of renewal in love, from dancing around the living room to falling asleep five minutes into a movie." Unlike previous Rascal Flatts singles, "Back to Life" is intended to be a standalone single, as opposed to being included on an album.

== Chart performance ==
=== Weekly charts ===
Chart (2018–2019)	Peak position
Canada Country (Billboard)	40
US Bubbling Under Hot 100 (Billboard)	20
US Country Airplay (Billboard)	17
US Hot Country Songs (Billboard)	28

=== Year-end charts ===
Chart (2019)	Position
US Country Airplay (Billboard)	56
US Hot Country Songs (Billboard)	69

== Certifications ==
Region	Certification	Certified units/sales
United States (RIAA)	Gold	500,000^{‡}
^{‡} Sales+streaming figures based on certification alone.
