= Hold On to Me (Lauren Daigle song) =

2021 song by Lauren Daigle

Single by Lauren Daigle
- Released: February 26, 2021 (solo version); March 26, 2021 (duet version)
- Genre: Contemporary Christian music
- Length: 3:05 (solo version); 3:11 (duet version)
- Label: Centricity Music
- Songwriters: Lauren Daigle; Paul Duncan; Paul Mabury
- Producer: Paul Mabury

Lauren Daigle singles chronology
"Come Back Home" (2021)	"Hold On to Me" (2021)	"Tremble" (2021)

Alternative cover
- "Hold On to Me (featuring AHI)"

Music video
- "Hold On to Me" on YouTube

"Hold On to Me" is a song performed by American contemporary Christian singer and songwriter Lauren Daigle. The song was released on February 26, 2021, as the lead single to her upcoming project. Daigle co-wrote the song with Paul Duncan and Paul Mabury. Paul Mabury worked on the production of the single.

"Hold On to Me" is Lauren Daigle's fifth No. 1 song on the US Hot Christian Songs chart. The song also went on to peak at No. 15 on the Bubbling Under Hot 100 chart. "Hold On to Me" received nominations for the Pop/Contemporary Recorded Song of the Year, and Short Form Video of the Year at the 2021 GMA Dove Awards. At the 2022 GMA Dove Awards, the song also received a GMA Dove Award nomination for Song of the Year.

== Background ==
On February 1, 2021, Lauren Daigle announced that she would be releasing a new single titled "Hold On to Me" on February 26, 2021. "Hold On to Me" was released on February 26, 2021, accompanied by an audio video of the song on YouTube. Daigle also revealed that the song was the "first taste" of an upcoming project.

== Writing and development ==
Daigle began writing "Hold On to Me" with Paul Duncan and Paul Mabury, while she was on tour, having songwriting sessions between tour stops in Wichita, Kansas and Phoenix, Arizona. She first performed the song while on tour in Wichita.

== Composition ==
"Hold On to Me" is composed in the key of D with a tempo of 74 beats per minute and a musical time signature of 4/4. Daigle's vocal range spans from G_{3} to A_{4} during the song.

== Accolades ==
Awards
Year	Organization	Award	Result	Ref
2021	GMA Dove Awards	Pop/Contemporary Recorded Song of the Year	Nominated	
2021	GMA Dove Awards	Short Form Video of the Year	Nominated	
2022	GMA Dove Awards	Song of the Year	Nominated	

== Commercial performance ==
"Hold On to Me" debuted on the Christian Airplay chart at number 25 dated March 6, 2021. The following week, it debuted at No. 3 on the Hot Christian Songs, after logging in its first full week of sales and streams. The song concurrently debuted on the Bubbling Under Hot 100 chart dated March 13, 2021, at No. 15.

"Hold On to Me" reached No. 1 on the Hot Christian Songs chart dated June 5, 2021, following to the surge in downloads after Lauren Daigle's performance of the song on the season finale of NBC's The Voice.

== Music video ==
The official audio video of "Hold On to Me" showcasing the single's artwork was released to YouTube on February 26, 2021. On March 11, 2021, Daigle released the music video of the song.

== Track listing ==
Digital download and streaming
No.	Title	Length
1.	"Hold On to Me"	3:05

Digital download and streaming
No.	Title	Length
1.	"Hold On to Me (featuring AHI)"	3:11

Apple Music bonus content
No.	Title	Length
1.	"Hold On to Me"	3:05
2.	"Lauren Daigle on "Hold On to Me"" (Behind the Scenes)	2:02

== Usage in media ==
"Hold On to Me" was featured on 9-1-1's 5th season episode, Defend in Place.

== Credits and personnel ==
Credits adapted from Tidal.

- Lauren Daigle – composition, vocals
- Paul Duncan – composition
- Mark Endert – mixing
- Joe LaPorta – mastering
- Paul Mabury – composition, production

== Charts ==
=== Weekly charts ===
Weekly chart performance for "Hold On to Me"
Chart (2021)	Peak position
Canada Hot Canadian Digital Songs (Billboard)	33
UK Cross Rhythms Weekly Chart	2
US Bubbling Under Hot 100 (Billboard)	15
US Adult Contemporary (Billboard)	14
US Hot Christian Songs (Billboard)	1
US Christian Airplay (Billboard)	3
US Christian AC (Billboard)	3
US Digital Song Sales (Billboard)	8

=== Year-end charts ===
Year-end chart performance for "Hold On to Me"
Chart (2021)	Position
UK Cross Rhythms Annual Chart	18
US Adult Contemporary (Billboard)	33
US Christian Songs (Billboard)	5
US Christian Airplay (Billboard)	15
US Christian AC (Billboard)	9

== Certifications ==
Region	Certification	Certified units/sales
United States (RIAA)	Platinum	1,000,000^{‡}
^{‡} Sales+streaming figures based on certification alone.

== Release history ==
Region	Date	Format	Label	Ref.
Various	February 26, 2021	Digital download; streaming	Centricity Music	
