= Ashes (EP) =

EP by Mia Fieldes
- Released: 8 May 2015
- Genre: CCM, worship
- Length: 19:35
- Label: Essential Worship, Provident

Ashes is the first extended play (EP) from Mia Fieldes. Essential Worship alongside Provident Label Group released the EP on 8 May 2015.

== Critical reception ==
Professional ratings
Review scores
Source	Rating
365 Days of Inspiring Media	4.5/5 stars
Christian Music Review	3.8/5
Worship Leader	4.5/5 stars

Awarding the EP four and a half stars from Worship Leader, Brendan Prout states, "the songs are sure to bring many to an honest and powerful encounter with the presence of the living God." Joshua Andre, giving the EP four and a half stars at 365 Days of Inspiring Media, writes, "an inviting and enjoyable EP". Rating the EP a 3.8 out of five for Christian Music Review, Laura Chambers describes, "As a lover of expressive writing, I can see Mia Fieldes’ gratitude for grace shining through in this pleasant set of songs, reminding us of His promises and provisions in this season of new life."

== Awards and accolades ==
This album was No. 19, on the Worship Leader's Top 20 Albums of 2015 list.

== Track listing ==
No.	Title	Writer(s)	Length
1.	"Live & Breathe"	Mia Fieldes, Jason Ingram, Jonathan Smith	4:28
2.	"Fearless"	Maggie Eckford, Fieldes, Smith	3:57
3.	"Ashes"	Fieldes, Ingram	3:47
4.	"If I Have You"	Fieldes, Andi Rozier, Todd Rukes	3:24
5.	"Christ Is Risen"	Mia Fieldes, Matt Maher	3:59
Total length:			19:35
