= Joyful (song) =

2021 song by Dante Bowe

Single by Dante Bowe

from the album Circles
- Released: March 12, 2021
- Recorded: 2020
- Genre: Contemporary gospel; Christian R&B
- Length: 2:16
- Label: Bethel Music
- Songwriters: Dante Bowe; Ben Schofield
- Producer: Ben Schofield

Dante Bowe singles chronology
"Voice of God" (2020)	"Joyful" (2021)	"Evidence (Live)" (2021)

Music video
- "joyful" on YouTube
- "joyful" (Live) on YouTube

"Joyful" (stylized in lower case) is a song by American Christian and Gospel singer and songwriter Dante Bowe, which was released on March 12, 2021, as the lead single to his second studio album, Circles. Bowe co-wrote the song with Ben Schofield. Ben Schofield handled the production of the single.

"Joyful" peaked at No. 14 on the US Hot Christian Songs chart, and at No. 3 on the Hot Gospel Songs chart. "Joyful" won the GMA Dove Award Contemporary Gospel Recorded Song of the Year at the 2021 GMA Dove Awards. It was nominated for the Grammy Award for Best Gospel Performance/Song at the 2022 Grammy Awards.

== Background ==
"We felt like for the times that "Joyful" was a message that felt important, you know what I mean? Choosing joy just felt more relevant — no pun intended — than anything right now. I think we wanted to just start the album off with, "You know what, this has been one crazy year, but we're going to be joyful.""

— Dante Bowe, on the decision to release "Joyful" as the lead single from Circles.

On March 12, 2021, Dante Bowe released "Joyful" as the lead single to his second studio album, Circles, along with its accompanying music video. The single followed the announcement made earlier that month, stated that Circles will be slated for release on March 26, 2021.

Dante Bowe spoke of the message behind the song, saying: "Joy is so different than happiness. While happiness is that temporary feeling created by circumstance, joy isn’t based on anything other than truth. You can be in a bad place or sad situation and still have joy: the knowing that greater things are coming and the moment you are in is not the end."

Bowe opined that "Joyful" a "completely different" single, stating that he was pushing boundaries of what he was offering his audience sonically, by giving them "something that they’d have to grow into."

== Composition ==
"Joyful" is a gospel and R&B song composed in the key of A♭ with a tempo of 92 beats per minute and a musical time signature of 4/4.

== Accolades ==
Awards
Year	Organization	Award	Result	Ref
2021	GMA Dove Awards	Contemporary Gospel Recorded Song of the Year	Won	
2022	Grammy Awards	Best Gospel Performance/Song	Nominated	

== Commercial performance ==
"Joyful" debuted at No. 39 on the US Hot Christian Songs chart, and at No. 22 on the Hot Gospel Songs chart. Following the album's release, "Joyful" debuted on Christian Airplay at No. 36. "Joyful" peaked at No. 14 on Hot Christian Songs, No. 3 on Hot Gospel Songs, and No. 12 on the Christian Airplay chart.

"Joyful" debuted at No. 23 on the Gospel Airplay chart dated July 31, 2021, making Bowe the first artist to simultaneously rank on the Christian radio and Gospel radio charts. "Joyful" went on to reach No. 1 on the Gospel Airplay chart dated February 26, 2022, becoming Bowe's first chart-topping song on Gospel radio.

== Music videos ==
Dante Bowe released the music video of "Joyful" via YouTube on March 12, 2021. Creedlife directed the music video. The video shows Bowe walking about in the neighborhood on a sunny day, interacting with the people in his community.

On June 7, 2021, Bethel Music published the live performance video of "Joyful" by Dante Bowe on YouTube.

== Performances ==
On January 14, 2022, Dante Bowe performed on "Joyful" on The Tamron Hall Show following his interview with Tamron Hall.

== Charts ==
=== Weekly charts ===
Weekly chart performance for "Joyful"
Chart (2021–2022)	Peak position
US Christian Songs (Billboard)	14
US Christian Airplay (Billboard)	12
US Christian AC (Billboard)	13
US Gospel Songs (Billboard)	3
US Gospel Airplay (Billboard)	1

=== Year-end charts ===
Year-end chart performance for "Joyful"
Chart (2021)	Position
US Christian Songs (Billboard)	57
US Christian Airplay (Billboard)	38
US Christian AC (Billboard)	38
US Gospel Songs (Billboard)	20

== Release history ==
Region	Date	Format	Label	Ref.
Various	March 12, 2021	Digital download; streaming	Bethel Music	
