= Peace Be Still (song) =

2020 song by Hope Darst

Single by Hope Darst

from the album Peace Be Still
- Released: February 7, 2020
- Recorded: 2020
- Genre: Contemporary worship music
- Length: 5:20; 7:18 (The Selah Session)
- Label: Fair Trade Services
- Songwriters: Andrew Holt; Hope Darst; Mia Fieldes
- Producer: Jonathan Smith

Hope Darst singles chronology
"Peace Be Still" (2020)	"Promise Keeper" (2020)

Peace Be Still (The Selah Session)
- The Selah Session cover

Music videos
- "Peace Be Still" on YouTube
- "Peace Be Still" (Lyrics) on YouTube

"Peace Be Still" is a song performed by American contemporary Christian singer Hope Darst. The song was released on February 7, 2020, as the lead single from her debut studio album, Peace Be Still (2020). Darst co-wrote the song with Andrew Holt and Mia Fieldes. Jonathan Smith produced the single.

"Peace Be Still" peaked at No. 6 on the US Hot Christian Songs chart. "Peace Be Still" received a nomination for the GMA Dove Award Worship Recorded Song of the Year at the 2021 GMA Dove Awards.

== Background ==
On February 7, 2020, Darst released "Peace Be Still" as her debut single via Fair Trade Services with her debut album slated for release in summer 2020. The song had been originally performed by The Belonging Co and Lauren Daigle, released on The Belonging Co's debut album, All the Earth (2017). On January 10, 2020, Fair Trade Services announced that "Peace Be Still" will be serviced to Christian radio in the United States, the official add date for the single slated on February 28, 2020. Darst shared the story behind the song, saying:

I have found myself fighting fear and anxiety in different seasons of life and what I've learned is that it doesn't always just go away because I think my way out of it, but I can worship my way through it. When we got together to write this song, one of the writers came in and said, 'I'm fighting a ton of fear today.' What they didn't know was that I, too, was battling intense fear and anxiety in my own life. So, we did the only thing we knew to do that day; we declared peace over ourselves. We knew that if we could sing God's promises over ourselves it would drown out the fear and would shift things inside of us. Fear and anxiety don't just disappear because we write songs or sing songs, but God has given us a weapon of worship to use every time the wave of fear wants to rise itself against us. This song is a prayer and a weapon; a prayer of peace over everything you are facing and a weapon of worship to defeat fear, depression, and doubt. God has promised you peace.

== Composition ==
"Peace Be Still" is composed in the key of A with a tempo of 71 beats per minute and a musical time signature of 4/4.

== Reception ==
=== Critical response ===
Jonathan Andre of 365 Days of Inspiring Media gave a positive review of the song, saying "Writing and singing about peace when the world they knew was upside down is quite a wacky concept. But as evident in the song and how strong it is lyrically and musically in my opinion, “Peace Be Still” is a winner!"

=== Accolades ===
Awards
Year	Organization	Award	Result	Ref
2021	GMA Dove Awards	Worship Recorded Song of the Year	Nominated	

== Music videos ==
The official lyric video of "Peace Be Still" was published on Hope Darst's YouTube channel on February 7, 2020. The official audio video of the song showcasing the single's artwork was published on YouTube on February 24, 2020. The official performance video for the "Peace Be Still" was availed by Hope Darst on August 16, 2020, to YouTube.

== Track listing ==
"Peace Be Still"
No.	Title	Producer	Length
1.	"Peace Be Still"	Jonathan Smith	5:20

"Peace Be Still" (The Selah Session)
No.	Title	Producer	Length
1.	"Peace Be Still" (The Selah Session)	Jonathan Smith; Max Corwin	7:18
2.	"Peace Be Still"	Jonathan Smith	5:20

== Charts ==
=== Weekly charts ===
Weekly chart performance for "Peace Be Still"
Chart (2020–2021)	Peak position
US Christian Songs (Billboard)	6
US Christian Airplay (Billboard)	6
US Christian AC (Billboard)	5

=== Year-end charts ===
Year-end chart performance for "Peace Be Still"
Chart (2020)	Position
US Christian Songs (Billboard)	42
US Christian Airplay (Billboard)	18
US Christian AC (Billboard)	12
US (WAY-FM)	5
Chart (2021)	Position
US Christian Songs (Billboard)	83

== Certifications ==
Region	Certification	Certified units/sales
United States (RIAA)	Gold	500,000^{‡}
^{‡} Sales+streaming figures based on certification alone.

== Release history ==
Release history and formats for "Peace Be Still"
Region	Date	Version	Format	Label	Ref.
Various	February 7, 2020	Album	Digital download; streaming	Fair Trade Services	
United States	February 28, 2020	Album	Christian radio	Fair Trade Services	
Various	November 6, 2020	The Selah Session	Digital download; streaming	Fair Trade Services	
