= Dante Bowe =

American musician (born 1993)

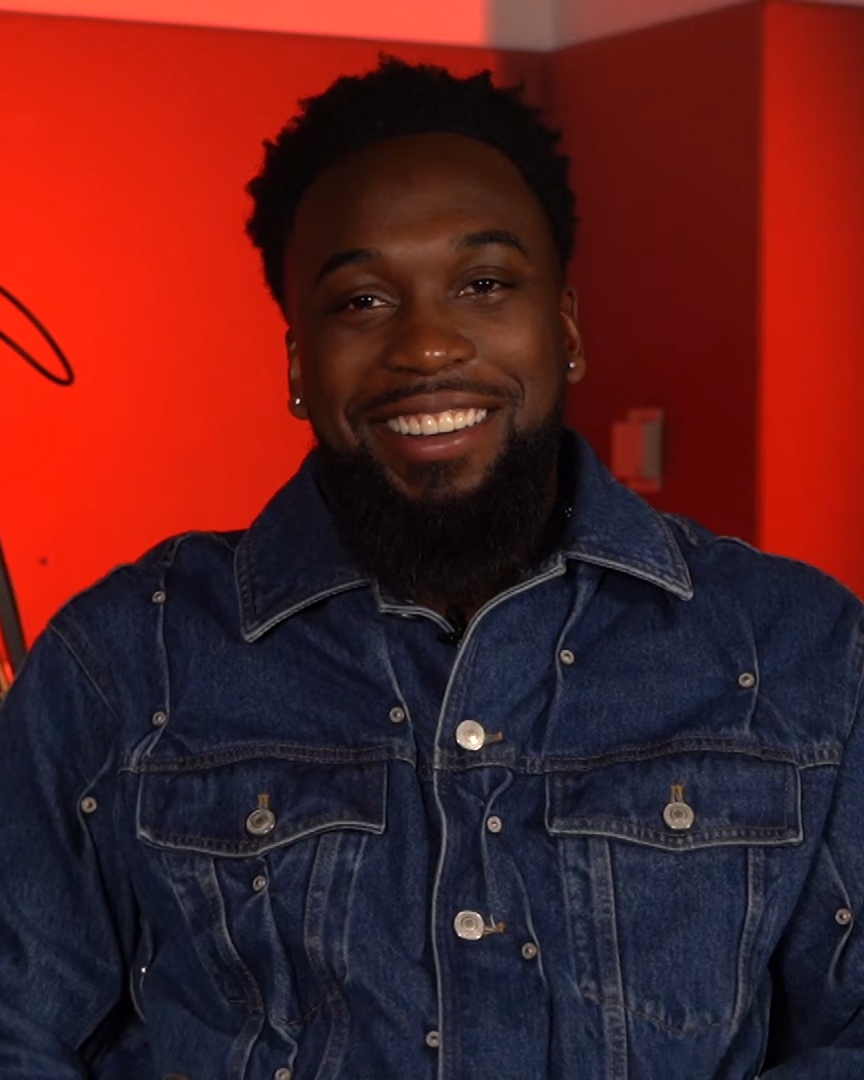
- Bowe in 2023

Background information
- Born: May 10, 1993 (age 33); Rockingham, North Carolina, U.S.
- Genres: Contemporary worship; contemporary gospel
- Occupations: Singer; songwriter
- Instruments: Vocals; piano
- Years active: 2016–present
- Label: TRUE
- Member of: Maverick City Music
- Formerly of: Bethel Music
- Website: Official website

Dante Bowe (born May 10, 1993) is an American contemporary music singer, songwriter, and performer. He is a Grammy Award, GMA Dove Award, Stellar Award, and BMI Award-winning artist. He is known as a founding member of Maverick City Music and a former member of the Bethel Music collective. As of 2025, Bowe has received two Grammy Awards, two GMA Dove Awards, a Stellar Award, and multiple BMI honors including Gospel Songwriter of the Year and Song of the Year.

In 2021, he released his second studio album, Circles, which contained the hit single "Joyful." "Joyful" won the GMA Dove Award for Contemporary Gospel Recorded Song of the Year at the 2021 GMA Dove Awards. Circles debuted at No. 7 on Billboard’s Top Gospel Albums chart in the United States. Bowe also featured on several collaborations, most notably the song "Wait on You" alongside Elevation Worship, Maverick City Music and Chandler Moore. Bowe received 5 nominations at the 2022 Grammy Awards, ultimately winning the Grammy Award for Best Contemporary Christian Music Album for his contributions to Old Church Basement (2021) by Elevation Worship and Maverick City Music.

In addition to Grammy and Dove recognition, Bowe was named BMI’s 2023 Gospel Songwriter of the Year and received BMI’s 2024 Song of the Year for "Gratitude". The Recording Academy has also recognized him in multiple features as a leading contemporary gospel and worship voice.

== Early life ==
Dante Bowe grew up in a Christian community in North Carolina. Bowe's grandparents were Christian ministers. Bowe attributed the cultivation of his musical appreciation to his parents, and went on to develop a love for singing after participating in a 7th-grade talent show. At 10 years old, Bowe was molested by a church elder. Bowe's parents separated when he was 11 years old, and at 12, he found out that they were drug dealers in order to sustain their family. Bowe became a converted Christian at 16 years, and his parents stopped dealing drugs around the same time, with his mother also becoming a converted Christian. At 16, Bowe also had his spiritual awakening through the music of Kierra Sheard, saying that the record Free (2011) had changed his life. Bowe dropped out of high school and committed himself to full-time ministry, becoming employed by Eddie James Ministries as a worship leader.

== Career ==
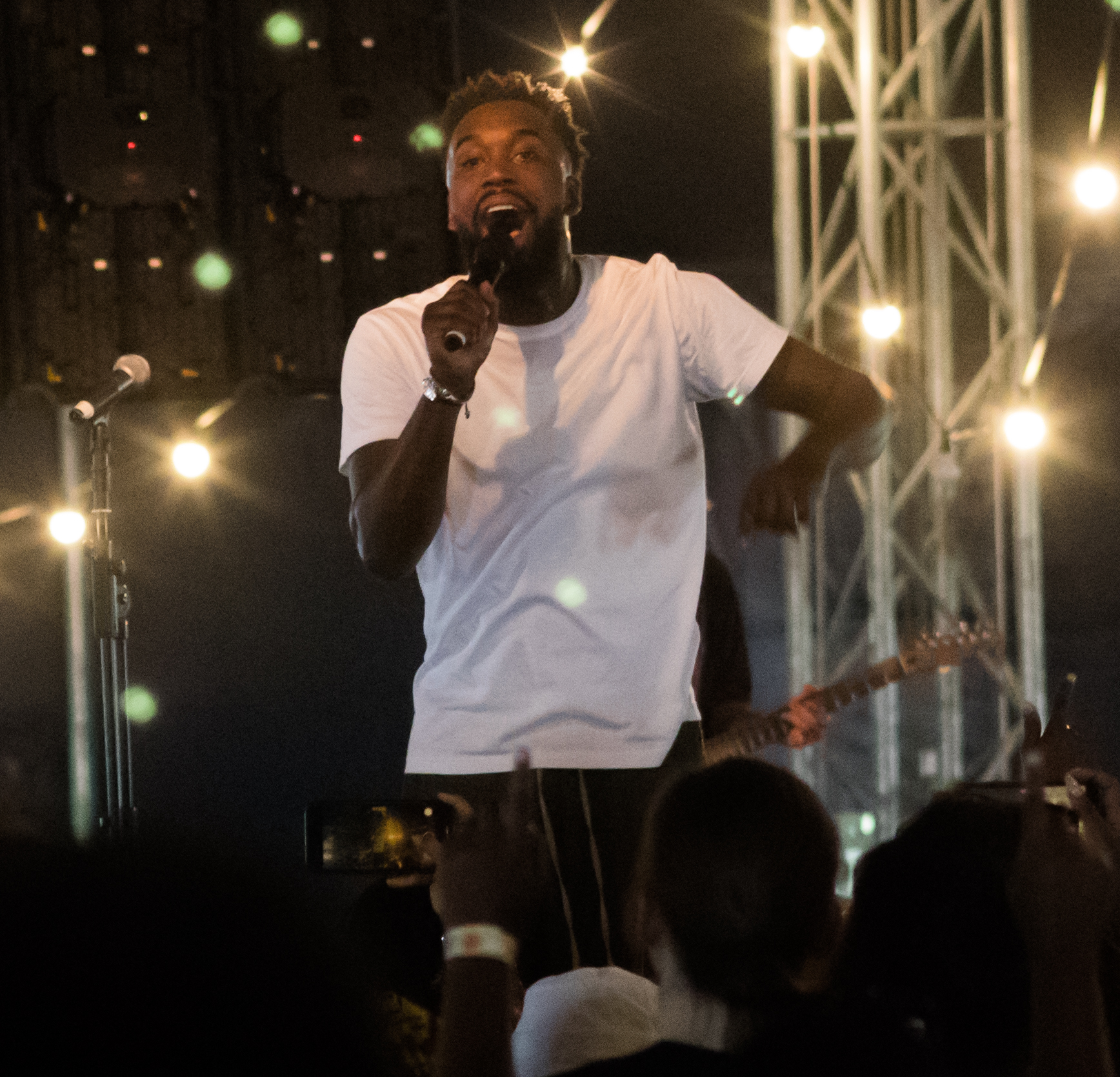
Bowe performing at the Big Church Festival at Wiston, West Sussex in 2022

In January 2017, Dante Bowe released his debut single, "Potter and Friend" featuring Jesse Cline. He then independently released his debut studio album, Son of a Father, on March 31, 2017.

On January 11, 2019, Dante Bowe released "The Giant Is Dead" featuring Travis Greene, as a standalone single. In July 2019, Bethel Music announced that they signed Dante Bowe, subsequently joining the Bethel Music collective. On May 15, 2020, Bowe and Bethel Music released "Champion" as the first promotional single from the album Revival's in the Air (2020). Bowe later released "Champion" as an official single on July 17, 2020. "Champion" peaked at No. 28 on the US Hot Christian Songs chart. On May 27, 2020, Bowe and Bethel Music released "Anything Is Possible" as a promotional single from Revival's in the Air. On August 14, 2020, Bowe released "Don't Talk About It" featuring Jesse Cline as a standalone single. On August 26, 2020, Bowe released "Be Alright" featuring Amanda Lindsey Cook, as a standalone single. On September 30, 2020, Bowe released "Voice of God" which featured Steffany Gretzinger and Chandler Moore. "Voice of God" peaked at No. 36 on the Hot Christian Songs chart.

On March 1, 2021, Dante Bowe announced that he will be releasing his second studio album, Circles, on March 26. He released "Joyful" as the lead single from Circles on March 12, 2021. "Joyful peaked at No. 14 on the Hot Christian Songs chart, and at No. 3 on the Hot Gospel Songs chart. Circles was released on March 26, 2021. Circles debuted at No. 7 on the Top Gospel Albums chart in the United States. Bowe alongside Chandler Moore featured on "Wait on You" by Elevation Worship and Maverick City Music, which was released as the third promotional single to their collaborative live album, Old Church Basement (2021), on April 23, 2021. "Wait on You" debuted at No. 9 on the US Hot Christian Songs chart and at No. 1 on the Hot Gospel Songs chart, becoming Bowe's first top ten entry on the Hot Christian Songs chart and his first number one hit on the Hot Gospel Songs chart.

Bowe received three nominations for the 2021 GMA Dove Awards, being nominated for New Artist of the Year, Contemporary Gospel Recorded Song of the Year for "Joyful", and Gospel Worship Recorded Song of the Year for "Voice of God", ultimately winning the Contemporary Gospel Recorded Song of the Year for "Joyful". Billboard named Dante Bowe the Top New Gospel Artist of 2021.

At the 2022 Grammy Awards, Bowe received three Grammy Award nominations for Best Gospel Performance/Song, for his singles "Voice of God" and "Joyful" as well as a group nomination for "Wait on You" by Elevation Worship and Maverick City Music, becoming the first person to achieve multiple nominations in the Best Gospel Performance/Song category since its formation in 2015. Bowe also received group nominations as a member of Maverick City Music for Old Church Basement in the Best Contemporary Christian Music Album category and Jubilee: Juneteenth Edition (2021) in the Best Gospel Album category. Bowe ultimately won the Grammy Award for Best Contemporary Christian Music Album for his contribution on Old Church Basement at the 2022 ceremony.

On March 4, 2022, Bowe released "The Healing" with Blanca as a single. "The Healing" peaked at No. 9 on the Hot Christian Songs chart. Bowe released "Nail Scarred Hands" as a single on April 1, 2022. On May 13, 2022, Bowe announced that he will embark on his first headlining tour, dubbed the Worship Nights Tour, joined by fellow Maverick City Music member Aaron Moses and Aodhan King of Hillsong Young & Free and set to visit eight cities in the United States during the summer of 2022. Bowe and Crowder released "God Really Loves Us" featuring Maverick City Music as a single on June 3, 2022. "God Really Loves Us" peaked at No. 3 on the Hot Christian Songs chart, and at No. 1 on the Hot Gospel Songs chart.

On September 26, 2022, Maverick City Music announced via a statement published on Instagram that they will be pausing their professional relationship with Dante Bowe, citing behaviour that was inconsistent with their core values and beliefs, the nature of which was not specified at the time. Bowe released a statement stating that he would be taking a break from social media and expressed his commitment to God's purpose for his life. It was later revealed that he had posted a nude photo to his Instagram account, though he claims Maverick City Music separated from him because his solo career was taking off.

Bowe received four nominations for the 2022 GMA Dove Awards, being nominated for Songwriter of the Year - Artist, Song of the Year for co-writing "Promises", and Rock/Contemporary Recorded Song of the Year and Short Form Music Video of the Year (Performance) for "I Love You" alongside Judah and Aaron Moses. At the 2023 Grammy Awards, Bowe also received a nomination for Best Contemporary Christian Music Performance/Song for "God Really Loves Us (Radio Version)" alongside Crowder, as well as Best Contemporary Christian Music Album for Breathe EP, of which Dante wrote on 4 of the 8 songs.

Bowe also contributed as a songwriter and featured artist on Kingdom Book One (2022), a collaborative album by Maverick City Music and Kirk Franklin. The album debuted at No. 1 on the US Top Gospel Albums chart, No. 2 on the Top Christian Albums chart, and No. 40 on the Billboard 200. Kingdom Book One went on to win Best Gospel Album at the 65th Annual Grammy Awards in 2023. On the project, Bowe co-wrote and performed several tracks, including:

- "The One You Love"
- "Take Me Back"
- "I Found You"
- "My Life Is in Your Hands"

At the 65th Annual Grammy Awards in 2023, Bowe was nominated for Best Contemporary Christian Music Performance/Song for “God Really Loves Us (Radio Version)” alongside Crowder and Maverick City Music. Bowe was also credited as a songwriter on Maverick City Music’s Breathe EP (2021), which was nominated for Best Contemporary Christian Music Album at the 65th Annual Grammy Awards in 2023. On the project, Bowe co-wrote five of the eight tracks, including "Make It Right," "Joy of the Lord," "Heal Our Land/Come and Move," "Nothing Left to Prove," and "Mighty One".

Bowe released his self-titled album, Dante Bowe, on July 21, 2023. The album debuted at No. 5 on iTunes and reached No. 21 on the Billboard charts. The album includes guest appearances from Flavour, Vic Mensa, Jekalyn Carr, and others. Its single "Wind Me Up" charted on R&B radio, and was one of the Top 5 Most Added songs at R&B radio upon release.

Bowe was named 2023 BMI Gospel Songwriter of the Year at the BMI Trailblazers of Gospel Awards. Bowe co-founded AMEN Music in 2023 alongside Dr. Field Harrison and Sabrina Harrison, in partnership with TRUE Music Label, releasing two albums, Amen Nights: Chapter 1 and In the Light.. In November 2024, Bowe wrote and performed "Grateful" featuring R&B artist Fridayy. "Grateful" went on to peak at No. 17 on the Billboard Gospel Airplay chart in August 2025. At the 2024 GMA Dove Awards, he celebrated a win for Worship Song of the Year with "Gratitude". Dante also received BMI’s 2024 Song of the Year recognition for "Gratitude". "Gratitude" also charted on Billboard, peaking at No. 1 on the Hot Gospel Songs chart. In summer 2025, Bowe released the single "All I Need" with Graham and also co-wrote the No. 1 Gospel Airplay hit "Constant", performed by Jordin Sparks and Chandler Moore.

On August 29, 2025, Bowe released Welcome Home, a live worship album featuring Tasha Cobbs Leonard, Benita Jones, Tamela Mann, Enrique Holmes, and Maryanne J. George. The project was recorded at a sold-out live event in Dallas. Bowe has also made notable television appearances, including performing at BET's Soul Train Awards. He continues to be recognized as a prominent voice in both contemporary gospel and worship music.

== Discography ==
Studio albums

- Son of a Father (2017)
- Circles (2021)
- Dante Bowe (2023)
- Welcome Home (2025)

== Tours ==
Headlining

- Worship Nights Tour (2022)
- Joyful The Tour (2022)

Supporting

- Welcome To Maverick City Tour (with Maverick City Music) (2021)
- What Are We Waiting For? – The Tour (with For King & Country) (2022)
- Kingdom Tour with (Maverick City Music and Kirk Franklin) (2022)
- Maverick City Music Live Show (with Maverick City Music)(2025)

== Awards and nominations ==
=== GMA Dove Awards ===
Year	Nominee / work	Award	Result	Ref.
2020	"Promises" (Note: Bowe is credited as a co-writer of "Promises" performed by Maverick City Music.) (Maverick City Music)	Gospel Worship Recorded Song of the Year	Nominated	
2021	Dante Bowe	New Artist of the Year	Nominated	
2021	"Joyful"	Contemporary Gospel Recorded Song of the Year	Won	
2021	"Voice of God" (featuring Steffany Gretzinger and Chandler Moore)	Gospel Worship Recorded Song of the Year	Nominated	
2022	"Promises" (Maverick City Music)	Song of the Year	Nominated	
2022	Dante Bowe	Songwriter of the Year - Artist	Nominated	
2022	"I Love You" (Judah. featuring Dante Bowe and Aaron Moses)	Rock/Contemporary Recorded Song of the Year of the Year	Nominated	
2022	"I Love You" (Judah. featuring Dante Bowe and Aaron Moses)	Short Form Music Video of the Year (Performance)	Nominated	
2023	"God Really Loves Us" (with Crowder featuring Maverick City Music)	Song of the Year	Nominated	
2023	"Gratitude" (Note: Bowe was credited as a co-writer on "Gratitude" by Brandon Lake.) (Brandon Lake)	Song of the Year	Won	
2023	"Gratitude" (Brandon Lake)	Worship Recorded Song of the Year	Nominated	
2023	Dante Bowe	Songwriter of the Year - Artist	Nominated	

=== Grammy Awards ===
Year	Nominee / work	Award	Result	Ref.
2022	"Joyful"	Best Gospel Performance/Song	Nominated	
2022	"Voice of God" (featuring Steffany Gretzinger and Chandler Moore)	Best Gospel Performance/Song	Nominated	
2022	"Wait on You" (Note: Bowe is credited as a co-writer of "Wait on You" performed by Elevation Worship and Maverick City Music.)	Best Gospel Performance/Song	Nominated	
2022	"Jireh" (Note: Bowe is credited as a member of Maverick City Music.)	Best Contemporary Christian Music Performance/Song	Nominated	
2022	Jubilee: Juneteenth Edition	Best Gospel Album	Nominated	
2022	Old Church Basement	Best Contemporary Christian Music Album	Won	
2023	"God Really Loves Us" (Crowder featuring Dante Bowe and Maverick City Music)	Best Contemporary Christian Music Performance/Song	Nominated	

== See also ==
- List of Christian worship music artists
