= Circles (Dante Bowe album) =

2021 studio album by Dante Bowe

Studio album by Dante Bowe
- Released: March 26, 2021
- Genre: Contemporary gospel; Christian R&B
- Length: 41:17
- Label: Bethel Music
- Producer: Lael; Ben Schofield; Stephen Blake Kanicka

Dante Bowe chronology
Son of a Father (2017)	Circles (2021)

Singles from Circles
- 1. "Joyful" Released: March 13, 2021

Circles (stylized in lower case) is the second studio album by American Christian singer and songwriter Dante Bowe. Bethel Music released the album on March 26, 2021. The album contains guest appearances by Trevor Jackson, Lael, and Bizzle. The album was produced by Lael, Ben Schofield, and Stephen Blake Kanicka.

The album was supported by the release of "Joyful" as a single. The album debuted at number seven on the US Top Gospel Albums chart.

== Background ==
Circles is Dante Bowe's second studio album, following his independent debut release, Son of a Father (2017). and his first label debut project, since signing with Bethel Music in 2019. Bowe began songwriting for the album in 2020, in the aftermath of his grandfather's passing and consumed by the 2020 Black Lives Matter protests, working with Lael and Ben Schofield in the production of the album.

Bowe said that the album title was drawn from the song "Circles", saying: "I wrote that song because I felt like last year, and still a little bit this year, that people feel like they’ve been spinning around in circles, dizzy and out of control." Bowe said that the song's message is that God is "the God of the circles," and he felt the song represented the whole project.

== Music and lyrics ==
Sonically, Bowe drew inspiration from the music of his childhood—gospel, '90s R&B, hip-hop, and soul. The lyrics of the album revolve around "themes of gratitude, forgiveness, perseverance, and understanding."

== Artwork ==
The photo for the album cover was shot by Donté Maurice. Bowe had initially wanted the album cover to be in a field, but Maurice suggested that the photo be done in a studio, with Bowe jumping off a trampoline to appear as though he jumping in the sky.

== Release and promotion ==
On March 1, 2021, Dante Bowe announced that he will be releasing his second studio album, Circles, on March 26. He released "Joyful" as the lead single from Circles on March 12, 2021. On March 19, 2021, Circles was availed for digital pre-order.

== Critical reception ==
Professional ratings
Review scores
Source	Rating
Jesus Freak Hideout	4.5/5 stars
JubileeCast	4.5/5

Timothy Yap of JubileeCast praised the album, saying, "With most songs clocking in at the 2 to 3 minute mark, most of the entries are punchy without much wasted notes. Though there are a couple of songs ("Over and Over" and "Keep Going") that border on the side of the ordinary, this record is superb. It is diverse, interesting, and it also hits you in the heart. "Love is in the Air," in particular, is the bomb." Reviewing for Jesus Freak Hideout, Andrew Blauwkamp wrote a positive review, saying: "I was pleasantly surprised with how creative and well-produced this album was. This is Dante Bowe's album through and through. He does nothing but shine on each track. Give Circles a spin and enjoy each minute of this musical experience."

== Commercial performance ==
In the United States, Circles debuted at No. 7 on the Top Gospel Albums chart.

== Track listing ==
Circles
No.	Title	Writer(s)	Producer(s)	Length
1.	"Circles"	Dante Bowe; Jeff Schneeweis	Lael	2:49
2.	"Okay" (featuring Trevor Jackson and Lael)	Bowe; Schneeweis; Trevor Jackson	Lael	2:36
3.	"Joyful"	Ben Schofield; Bowe	Ben Schofield	2:17
4.	"Just Me"	Bowe; Schneeweis	Lael	3:04
5.	"All God's Children"	Bowe; Stephen Blake Kanicka	Stephen Blake Kanicka	2:56
6.	"Real Kind of Love"	Bowe; Schneeweis	Lael	2:49
7.	"Good Times"	Bowe; Schneeweis	Lael	2:47
8.	"Keep Going"	Bowe; Schneeweis	Lael	3:11
9.	"I Wanna Know You"	Bowe; Kanicka	Stephen Blake Kanicka	3:38
10.	"Love is in the Air"	Bowe; Kanicka	Stephen Blake Kanicka	4:06
11.	"Family Tree"	Schofield; Bowe	Ben Schofield	3:56
12.	"Over and Over" (featuring Bizzle)	Bowe; Schneeweis; Mark Julian Felder; Suzanne Vega	Lael	3:37
13.	"You"	Bowe; Schneeweis	Lael	3:37
Total length:				41:17

== Charts ==
=== Weekly charts ===
Weekly chart performance for Circles
Chart (2021)	Peak position
US Gospel Albums (Billboard)	7

=== Year-end charts ===
Year-end chart performance for Circles
Chart (2021)	Position
US Gospel Albums (Billboard)	25
Chart (2022)	Position
US Gospel Albums (Billboard)	32

== Release history ==
Region	Date	Format	Label	Ref.
Various	March 26, 2021	Digital download; streaming	Bethel Music	
