= Sarah Reeves =

American musician (born 1989)

- Born: April 29, 1989 (age 37); Athens, Alabama, U.S.
- Other name: Sarah Elizabeth
- Occupations: Musician; singer
- Years active: 2006–present
- Spouse: Philip Kothlow (2011-2021) Bill McAdams jr. ( 2024-Present)
- Parents: John Mark Reeves (father); Tina Key Reeves (mother)
- Musical career
- Genres: Contemporary Christian music; worship
- Instruments: Vocals; keyboards
- Labels: Sparrow; Curb
- Member of: The Belonging Co
- Website: sarahreevesmusic.com

Sarah Elizabeth Reeves (born April 29, 1989) is an American musician and singer who primarily plays a Christian pop and worship style of music. She has released five extended plays and three studio albums (two of which are independently released).

== Early and personal life ==
Sarah Elizabeth Reeves was born on April 29, 1989, in Athens, Alabama. She is the daughter of John Mark "Hershey" Reeves and Tina Key Reeves and has two younger sisters and an older brother. One of her younger sisters, Mary Reeves, is in the band Only in Stories. Her father is a music producer and songwriter who helped to establish Sound Cell Studios in Huntsville, Alabama, where Sarah recorded her first album. Reeves says that when she was 15 years old, she was called by God to become a worship leader. She was married to Philip Kothlow until their divorce in 2021. In 2024 she married Bill McAdams Jr.

== Music career ==
Reeves' music career started in 2006 with her first major-label release, Sweet Sweet Sound, an extended play that was released on April 21, 2009, from Sparrow Records. This extended play was her breakthrough release upon the Billboard magazine charts, placing No. 19 on the Christian Albums chart and No. 9 on the Heatseekers Albums. The song "Sweet Sweet Sound" peaked at No. 27 on the Christian Songs chart and at No. 24 on the Christian AC Songs chart. Her subsequent extended play, God of the Impossible, was released on April 20, 2010, with Sparrow Records. The first studio album, Broken Things, was released on July 26, 2011. She released Christmas, an independently made extended play, in 2013. Her second studio album, Acoustic Worship Covers, Vol. 1, was released on March 24, 2014. On May 14, 2021, the Belonging Co released "Eyes on You", featuring Sarah Reeves, as the second promotional single from See the Light.

== Discography ==
=== Studio albums ===
List of studio albums, with selected details
Title	Album details
Broken Things	Released: July 26, 2011; Label: Independent; Formats: CD, digital download
Acoustic Worship Covers, Vol. 1	Released: March 24, 2014; Label: Independent; Formats: CD, digital download
Easy Never Needed You	Released: October 19, 2018; Label: Curb; Formats: CD, digital download
Life Love & Madness	Released: October 9, 2020; Label: Curb; Formats: CD, digital download
More the Merrier	Released: November 12, 2021; Label: Curb; Formats: CD, digital download
Best Days	Released: September 22, 2023; Label: Curb; Formats: CD, digital download

=== Extended plays ===
List of EPs, with selected chart positions
Title	EP details	Peak chart positions	
Title	EP details	US Chr.	US Heat.
Sweet Sweet Sound	Released: April 19, 2009; Label: Sparrow; Formats: CD, digital download	19	8
God of the Impossible	Released: April 20, 2010; Label: Sparrow; Formats: CD, digital download	—	—
Christmas	Released: December 1, 2013; Label: Independent; Formats: CD, digital download	—	—
Easy Never Needed You	Released: April 27, 2018; Label: Curb; Formats: CD, digital download	—	—
Let It Snow	Released: November 9, 2018; Label: Curb; Formats: CD, digital download	—	—
"—" denotes a recording that did not chart or was not released in that territory.

=== Singles ===
List of singles, with selected chart positions
Title	Year	Peak chart positions							Album
Title	Year	UK Cross	US Christ.	US Christ. Airplay	US Christ. AC	US AC	US Adult	US Pop	Album
"Sweet Sweet Sound"	2009	3	—	27	24	—	—	—	Sweet Sweet Sound
"Mighty Wave"	2011	—	—	—	—	—	—	—	Broken Things
"Lamb of God"	2014	—	—	—	—	—	—	—	Raise Up the Crown
"Your Love Is Strong"	2014	—	—	—	—	—	—	—	Non-album singles
"Waterfall"	2014	—	—	—	—	—	—	—	Non-album singles
"In Your Name"	2014	—	—	—	—	—	—	—	Non-album singles
"We Believe"	2014	—	—	—	—	—	—	—	Non-album singles
"Come as You Are"	2014	—	—	—	—	—	—	—	Non-album singles
"King of All the Earth"	2014	—	—	—	—	—	—	—	Non-album singles
"Broken Vessels (Amazing Grace)"	2014	—	—	—	—	—	—	—	Non-album singles
"God Rest Ye Merry Gentlemen"	2014	—	—	44	11	—	—	—	Non-album singles
"Nowhere"	2017	—	—	—	—	—	—	—	Easy Never Needed You
"Details"	2017	1	40	28	—	—	—	—	Easy Never Needed You
"Angels We Have Heard on High"	2017	—	—	35	21	—	—	—	Let It Snow
"Easy"	2018	—	44	—	—	—	—	—	Easy Never Needed You
"I Love You" (with Kirk Franklin)	2018	—	—	—	—	—	—	—	Easy Never Needed You
"Right Where You Want Me"	2018	—	—	35	—	—	—	—	Easy Never Needed You
"Feelin' Like Christmas"	2018	—	50	36	30	—	—	—	Let It Snow
"Anxious"	2019	4	—	—	—	—	—	—	Life Love & Madness
"Just Want You"	2020	—	43	—	—	—	—	—	Easy Never Needed You
"Not My Style"	2021	—	—	—	—	—	—	—	Life Love & Madness
"Tell Me Why" (with Armin van Buuren)	2021	—	—	—	—	—	—	—	Non-album single
"Best Days"	2022	6	—	—	—	—	—	—	Best Days
"Get Back Your Fight"	2023	—	—	—	—	19	18	—	Best Days
"Christmas Feels Different This Year"	2023	—	—	—	—	26	—	—	More the Merrier (deluxe)
"More Than Enough"	2024	—	—	—	—	12	16	—	Non-album singles
"Holly Jolly Christmas"	2024	—	—	—	—	16	—	—	Non-album singles
"Cloud Nine"	2025	9	—	—	—	14	17	32	Non-album singles
"Winter Wonderland" (with Clark Beckham)	2025	—	—	—	—	24	—	—	Non-album singles
"—" denotes a recording that did not chart or was not released in that territory.

== Awards and nominations ==
Year	Organization	Nominee / work	Category	Result	Ref.
2025	We Love Awards	"Cloud Nine"	Mainstream Impact Award	Pending	
