= Krissy Nordhoff =

American Christian musician (born 1974)

- Also known as: Krissy Nordhoff
- Born: Kristen Lynn Stora; June 24, 1974 (age 52); Allegan, Michigan, U.S.
- Origin: Franklin, Tennessee, U.S.
- Genres: Worship, CCM
- Occupations: Singer, songwriter
- Instruments: vocals, singer-songwriter
- Years active: 2004–present
- Label: ICC
- Website: krissynordhoff.com

Krissy Nordhoff (born June 24, 1974; as Kristen Lynn Stora) is a Grammy-nominated and two-time GMA Dove Award-winning professional songwriter, author, and mentor.

A Michigan native, Krissy grew up loving Christian music. She attended Anderson University, where she studied songwriting with the legendary Gloria Gaither. After college, Krissy was an independent artist in Nashville, and eventually found her sweet spot in the writing room. She garnered three Dove Award nominations and won a Dove Award for Worship Song of the Year for the beloved anthem “Your Great Name." She was also nominated for a Grammy® Award and won a Dove Award for her song “Famous For (I Believe)." Her songs have been recorded by a variety of artists, including Natalie Grant, Tauren Wells, Jenn Johnson, Jordan St. Cyr, Jon Reddick, Tasha Cobbs, Doe Jones, Natalie Layne, Darlene Zschech, David and Nicole Binion.

Passionate about training and encouraging the next generation of worship songwriters, Krissy founded two communities: Brave Worship (Women) and Writing Worship, offering community and online resources. She has authored two other books: Writing Worship--How To Craft Heartfelt Songs for the Church (David C Cook,) and Psalming--A Songwriter's Guide to Singing the Psalms.

Krissy, Eric, and their three children live in the suburbs of Nashville, TN.

== Early life ==
Nordhoff was born Kristen Lynn Stora on June 24, 1974, in Allegan, Michigan. She suffered with Lyme disease in 2002 where she got a tick bite in 1999, but she has since made a full recovery from illness.

== Music career ==
Nordhoff's music recording career commenced in 2004, when her first studio album, Thank Him, was released on November 1, 2004 by ICC Records. Her subsequent studio album, Downpour, was released on September 10, 2007, with ICC Records. She won a GMA Dove Award, for Worship Song of the Year at the 43rd GMA Dove Awards, due to her songwriting of her songwriting on "Your Great Name", performed by Natalie Grant on her 2010 studio album, Love Revolution.

== Personal life ==
She is married to Eric Nordhoff, where together they reside in Franklin, Tennessee, attending Gateway Church located in their hometown, with their three children, two sons and a daughter.

== Discography ==
Studio albums

- Krissy Nordhoff (April 2001, Indie)
- Thank Him (November 1, 2004, ICC)
- Downpour (September 10, 2007, ICC)
- Pieces (June, 2011, Indie)
- Let God Be Praised (March, 2014, Indie)
- Krissy's Got Your Backup Tracks (July, 2015, Indie)
- My Heart Is Full (May, 2015, Indie)
- Torn & Poured (March, 2021, Indie)
- Green (March, 2023, Vere)
- Wintry Mix (November, 2024, Vere)
- Merry Everything, Happy Always (November, 2025 Vere)
