= Chuck Butler =

American music producer, songwriter and composer

- Birth name: Charles Roland Butler
- Also known as: Chuck
- Born: February 10, 1971 (age 54)
- Origin: Jackson, Tennessee
- Occupation(s): music producer, composer, songwriter,
- Instrument: Multi-instrumentalist
- Years active: 1995–present
- Labels: Maverick City Music, Essential Music Publishing, BuddyBabe Music, Jord A Lil Music

Charles Roland "Chuck" Butler (born February 10, 1971) is an American Pop, Film/TV and Christian music producer, songwriter and composer. He has received 3 Grammy Awards as well as 6 GMA Dove Awards for his songwriting and music production work.

== Early and personal life ==
Butler was born, Charles Roland Butler, on February 10, 1971, while he graduated from North Side High School, located in Jackson, Tennessee, in 1989. He was married to his wife Amy Rebecca Russell on July 27, 1996 in Jackson, Tennessee. They have two children.

== Music career ==
His music production songwriting career commenced around 1995 as lead singer and guitarist for CCM group "Justified" He later joined the group "A Cross Between" that went on to win the GMA Spotlight Competition in 1997, resulting in a record contract with then label Benson Records in 1998. This prompted the move to Nashville, Tennessee. "A Cross Between" broke up in 2000 but Butler continued writing for Brentwood - Benson Publishing until 2004. It was then that he started working exclusively in the pop market, with artists including India.Arie, The Backstreet Boys, Nick Lachey, Katelyn Tarver, Ace Young, Kimberly Locke, Nick Carter, A.J. McLean, Brian Littrell and many others. 2009 saw his return to the CCM market and a new publishing deal with Essential Music Publishing. Since then, Butler has gone on to produce or write songs for acts such as Tauren Wells, Doe Jones, Bethel Music, Evvie McKinney, TobyMac, Mandisa, Sanctus Real, Brandon Heath, Building 429, Kari Jobe, Jamie Grace, Audio Adrenaline, Tenth Avenue North, Tim Timmons, The Almost, Kerrie Roberts, Royal Tailor, Group 1 Crew and many others.

In 2010, Butler teamed up with former "A Cross Between" member Luke Brown to form the band "The So Manys". The band was targeted mainly at the Film/TV markets where they've had much success with placements that include GLEE, American Idol, So You Think You Can Dance, Sister Wives, Extreme Makeover, NBC Election Night coverage, What To Expect When You're Expecting motion picture, White House Black Market and Swarovski ad campaigns, and most recently the theme song for "The Dude Perfect Show' on the CMT Network.

Butler has had seven Grammy nominations, and has won three Grammy Awards for his work on Doe Jones’ “Heart Of A Human”, TobyMac's This Is Not A Test and Mandisa's Overcomer albums, as well as six GMA Dove Awards. He has received numerous BMI Awards for radio airplay. In 2020, he received a RIAA Platinum Certification for "Hills And Valleys" and a Gold Certification in 2022 for “Famous For (I Believe)”, both performed by Tauren Wells.
