= Mia Fieldes =

Australian Christian musician

- Born: Mia Leanne Cherie Fieldes; 29 January 1983 (age 43); Australia
- Origin: Sydney, Australia
- Genres: CCM, worship
- Occupations: Singer, songwriter
- Instrument: Vocals
- Years active: 2009–present
- Labels: Essential Worship, Provident
- Website: miafieldesmusic.com

Mia Leanne Cherie Fieldes (born 29 January 1983), is an Australian Christian musician. Her first album, There's a Reason, was released by herself in 2009. She signed with Provident Label Group, where their imprint Essential Worship, released her debut extended play, Ashes, in 2015.

== Early life ==
She was born Mia Leanne Cherie Fieldes, in Australia on 29 January 1983, as the third triplet, to mother Glenda May Fieldes, with two other sisters, Darna and Kizziah, plus she has two more younger sisters, Ruby, and the youngest, Violet. While she was thirteen years old, Fieldes would write letters to God, asking Him various things, such as the profession she would undertake, as a songwriter. Her career in music ministry got underway, while she was seventeen years old, at Hillsong Church, in Sydney, Australia, where she would be based for ten years, learning her craft of songwriting and musicianship, all the while, growing in her faith.

== Music career ==
Her music recording career commenced in 2009, with the self-released album, There's a Reason, and it was released on 2 June 2009. She went the songwriting route, instead of releasing more recorded music, where she wrote songs for a myriad of Christian musicians in Australia, Canada, United Kingdom, and the United States. The first extended play, Ashes, was released by Essential Worship, on 8 May 2015, after she signed a recording contract with Provident Label Group.

== Personal life ==
Fieldes moved to Nashville, Tennessee, around her 30th birthday, where she is one of the current worship leaders, at The Belonging Co Church. She married Joren Dunnavant, a city planner, on 7 March 2017.

== Discography ==
Albums

- There's a Reason (2 June 2009, Independent)

EPs

- Ashes (8 May 2015, Essential Worship/Provident)

Singles

Year	Single	Chart positions
Year	Single	US Christian Songs
2015	"Fearless"	43
