= Cody Carnes discography =

- Studio albums: 2
- EPs: 2
- Live albums: 2
- Singles: 30

American contemporary Christian musician Cody Carnes has released two studio albums, two live albums, two extended plays, and twenty-nine singles (including seven promotional singles).

== Studio albums ==
List of studio albums, with selected chart positions
Title	Album details	Peak chart positions
Title	Album details	US Christ.
The Darker the Night / The Brighter the Morning	Debut album; Released: September 15, 2017; Label: Sparrow Records; Format: Digital download, streaming	17
Run to the Father	Released: March 13, 2020; Label: Sparrow Records; Format: Digital download, streaming	12
"—" denotes a recording that did not chart

== Live albums ==
List of live albums, with selected chart positions
Title	Album details	Peak chart positions
Title	Album details	US Christ.
God Is Good!	Released: September 30, 2022; Label: Capitol CMG; Format: Digital download, streaming	45
Firm Foundation	Released: August 25, 2023; Label: Capitol CMG; Format: Digital download, streaming	37
"—" denotes a recording that did not chart

== EPs ==
List of extended plays
Title	Album details
The Lighter Side	Released: December 22, 2009; Label: Independent; Format: Digital download, streaming
All He Says I Am	Released: January 14, 2014; Label: Gateway Create; Format: Digital download, streaming

== Singles ==
=== As lead artist ===
List of singles and peak chart positions
Title	Year	Chart positions					Certifications	Album
Title	Year	US Bub.	US Christ	US Christ Air.	US Christ AC	US Christ Digital	Certifications	Album
"All He Says I Am" (featuring Kari Jobe)	2011	—	—	—	—	37		Non-album single
"Walls"	2012	—	—	—	—	—		Non-album single
"The Cross Has the Final Word"	2017	—	45	—	—	—		The Darker the Night / The Brighter the Morning
"Hold It All"	2017	—	—	—	—	—		The Darker the Night / The Brighter the Morning
"Til the End of Time" (featuring Kari Jobe)	2017	—	50	—	—	—		The Darker the Night / The Brighter the Morning
"What Freedom Feels Like"	2017	—	44	32	—	—		The Darker the Night / The Brighter the Morning
"Cover the Earth" (with Kari Jobe)	2018	—	29	31	—	11		Non-album single
"Nothing Else"	2019	—	31	—	—	13	RIAA: Gold	Run to the Father
"Heaven Fall"	2019	—	—	—	—	—		Run to the Father
"Run to the Father"	2019	—	23	25	22	14	RIAA: Gold	Run to the Father
"Christ Be Magnified"	2020	—	45	—	—	—		Run to the Father
"The Blessing" (with Kari Jobe and Elevation Worship)	2020	15	2	7	5	1	RIAA: 2× Platinum	Graves into Gardens
"Too Good to Not Believe" (with Brandon Lake)	2021	—	45	40	—	—		Non-album singles
"Hope of the Ages" (with Hillsong Worship and Reuben Morgan)	2021	—	49	—	—	—		Non-album singles
"Firm Foundation (He Won't)"	2021	—	5	2	2	9	RIAA: Gold	Firm Foundation
"Be Glad"	2022	—	—	—	—	—		Firm Foundation
"Good (Can't Be Anything Else)"	2022	—	—	39	—	—		God Is Good!
"Ain't Nobody"	2022	—	5	2	2	—		God Is Good!
"Who Is This Man"	2023	—	—	—	—	—		Firm Foundation
"Plead the Blood" (with Chris Davenport and Brandon Lake)	2023	—	—	—	—	—		Time
"Call On The Name"	2023	—	—	—	—	—		Firm Foundation
"Take You At Your Word" (with Benjamin William Hastings)	2024	—	11	1	6	—		God Is Good!
"Our God Reigns (Over All the Earth)" (with Martin Smith and Kari Jobe)	2025	—	—	—	—	—		Non-album single ]
"—" denotes a recording that did not chart

=== As featured artist ===
List of singles and peak chart positions
Title	Year	Chart positions		Album
Title	Year	US Christ	US Christ. Digital	Album
"Eyes Wide Shut" (Nitro and Lightning featuring Cody Carnes)	2011	—	—	Redial (single)
"With You" (The Lighter Side featuring Cody Carnes and Dara Maclean)	2012	—	—	With You (EP)
"Firm Foundation (He Won't)" (Maverick City Music featuring Chandler Moore and Cody Carnes)	2022	33	12	Non-album singles
"The Commission" (Cain featuring Cody Carnes)	2022	—	—	Non-album singles
"—" denotes a recording that did not chart

== Promotional singles ==
=== As lead artist ===
Song	Year	Album
"Full of Faith"	2017	The Darker the Night / The Brighter the Morning
"Resurrection Blood"	2017	The Darker the Night / The Brighter the Morning
"Obsession (Spontaneous)" (with Kari Jobe)	2020	The Blessing
"Forever and Amen" (with Kari Jobe)	2022	God Is Good!

=== As featured artist ===
Title	Year	Peak chart positions		Album
Title	Year	US Christ	US Christ. Digital	Album
"Way Maker" (Passion featuring Kristian Stanfill, Kari Jobe and Cody Carnes)	2020	39	9	Roar (Live From Passion 2020)
"Firm Foundation (He Won't)" (The Belonging Co featuring Cody Carnes)	2022	—	—	Here
"Simple Kingdom" (Bryan & Katie Torwalt featuring Cody Carnes)	2022	—	—	I've Got Good News
"—" denotes a recording that did not chart

== Other charted songs ==
Title	Year	Peak chart positions		Album
Title	Year	US Christ	Christ Air.	Album
"Holy Spirit" (Kari Jobe featuring Cody Carnes)	2016	37	—	Majestic
"Take You at Your Word" (with Benjamin William Hastings)	2022	—	41	God Is Good!
"—" denotes a recording that did not chart

== Other appearances ==
Song	Year	Album	Ref.
"By Your Side" (The Lighter Side featuring Jillian Edwards and Cody Carnes)	2012	With You (EP)	
"Slow Dance" (The Lighter Side featuring Cody Carnes)	2012	With You (EP)	
"Same Side" (The Lighter Side featuring Molly Reed and Cody Carnes)	2012	With You (EP)	
"With You" (The Lighter Side featuring Cody Carnes)	2012	With You (EP)	
"All He Says I Am" (Gateway Worship featuring Cody Carnes)	2012	Forever Yours	
"Christmas with You" (Clyde Bawden & Jason Barney featuring Cody Carnes and Ashley Hess)	2013	Glenn Beck Presents: Believe Again	
"Angels We Have Heard on High" (Clyde Bawden & Jason Barney featuring Cody Carnes and David Osmond)	2013	Glenn Beck Presents: Believe Again	
"What Child Is This" (Clyde Bawden & Jason Barney featuring Cody Carnes and Dianne Michelle)	2013	Glenn Beck Presents: Believe Again	
"Let the Heavens Open" (Gateway Devotions featuring Kari Jobe and Cody Carnes)	2014	The Blessed Life: Songs from Gateway Devotions (compilation)	
"Walls" (Gateway Worship featuring Cody Carnes)	2015	Walls	
"Whatever You Want" (Gateway Worship featuring Cody Carnes)	2015	Walls	
"Who Is Like You" (Gateway Devotions featuring Cody Carnes)	2016	The God I Never Knew (compilation)	
"Living Water" (Gateway Devotions featuring Cody Carnes)	2016	The God I Never Knew (compilation)	
"Closer to Your Heart" (Kari Jobe featuring Cody Carnes)	2017	The Garden	
"Here as in Heaven" (Kari Jobe featuring Cody Carnes)	2017	The Garden	
"Testimony" (The Belonging Co featuring Cody Carnes)	2017	All the Earth	
"Nothing Else" (The Belonging Co featuring Cody Carnes)	2019	Awe + Wonder	
"Christ Be Magnified" (The Belonging Co featuring Cody Carnes)	2021	See the Light	
"Christ Be Magnified" (Passion featuring Cody Carnes)	2022	Burn Bright	
