= I Am They =

American contemporary Christian band

- Origin: Carson City, Nevada
- Genres: Worship; CCM; Christian rock; Christian pop; Christian country; folk rock; folk pop
- Years active: 2008–2022
- Labels: Essential, Big Future
- Past members: Matthew Hein; Cheyenne Mitchell; Brandon Chase; Justin Shinn; Nicole Hickman; Stephanie Kulla; Bobby Stiehler; Raul Aguilar Jr.; Adam Palmer; Sara Palmer; Jon McConnell; Abbie Parker
- Website: iamthey.com

I Am They was an American Christian music band from Carson City, Nevada, formed in 2008. The band consisted of five members and was first signed to Essential Records. Their self-titled debut album was released in 2015. They were most recently signed to Big Future Records.

== Background ==
I Am They, a Christian band from Carson City, Nevada was initially formed as a worship ministry called "Solomon's Porch" for what was intended to be a single night worship gathering on October 31, 2008, hosted at Calvary Chapel Carson City. After a positive reception from the local church community, the band continued holding bi-monthly worship gatherings.

After receiving an offer from local Christian concert promoters, Ian Bullis and Jonathan Velasquez, to open for CCM artist Matthew West in January 2009, the band began to write original material and formally changed their name to I Am They in order to differentiate it from the bi-monthly worship ministry they hosted.

The band signed to Provident Label Group in the summer of 2013 and went into the studio in January 2014 to record their self-titled debut at Yackland Studios in Nashville, TN with Producer Jonathan Smith and Executive Producer Jason Ingram. Their debut album was released on January 27, 2015.

In winter and spring of 2015, the band was a part of the national touring "Rock & Worship Roadshow" alongside MercyMe, Crowder, and Group 1 Crew, followed by a tour with Matt Maher on the spring leg of the Saints & Sinners tour.

In August 2015, I Am They received a Dove Award nomination for New Artist of the Year.

In March 2016, Abbie Parker replaced Stephanie Kulla as the lead female vocalist for the band. On the same day, the band released a new single "Make A Way" featuring Abbie Parker. I AM THEY released the 4-song worship EP The Resting Place - EP in June 2016.

In April 2017, a new vocalist, Houston resident Jon McConnell, was introduced with the release of the band's new song, Crown Him.

In early 2019, a new drummer/percussionist, Nicole Hickman, joined the group, allowing Sara Palmer to focus on planning and promotion full-time. Nicole had spent a number of years touring with Holly Starr.

In January 2022, the band announced that they had signed with Big Future Music Group in a joint venture with Truss Records. The announcement also pictured and listed Cheyenne Mitchell as vocalist, in place of previous lead female vocalist Abbie Parker. On September 29, 2022, the band announced they were disbanding after 14 years. They performed their last concert on December 8 of that year, streaming it on their YouTube page.

== Former Members ==
- Matthew Hein – vocals, guitar, banjo, dobro, mandolin (2009-2022)
- Cheyenne Mitchell (2022)
- Justin Shinn – keys, organ, concert drum, banjo, mandolin, bass (2009-2022)
- Nicole Hickman (2019–2022)– drums, percussion
- Brandon Chase (August 2019–2022) – vocals, guitar, banjo
- Stephanie Kulla (2009-2015) – vocals
- Bobby Stiehler – bass, percussion
- Raul Aguilar Jr. – bass
- Adam Palmer (2009-2016) – vocals, guitar, Nashville high-strung guitar, banjo, dobro, concert drum
- Sara Palmer (2015-2019) – drums, percussion
- Jon McConnell (until late 2019) – vocals, guitar, keys
- Abbie Parker (2016–2021) – vocals, harmonium, keys

== Discography ==
=== Albums ===
List of studio albums, with selected chart positions
Title	Album details	Peak chart positions	
Title	Album details	US Christ	UK C & G
I Am They	Released: January 27, 2015; Label: Essential Records; Format: CD, digital download	10	—
Trial & Triumph	Released: March 2, 2018; Label: Essential Records; Format: CD, digital download	23	15
Faithful God	Released: October 23, 2020; Label: Essential Records; Format: CD, digital download	43	—

=== Extended plays ===
List of EPs
Title	Details
The Prelude	Released: August 2, 2011; Label: Independent; Format: CD
Sanctuaries	Released: February 20, 2013; Label: Independent; Format: CD, Streaming
Resting Place	Released: June 10, 2016; Label: Provident; Format: Download, Streaming
Chapel Sessions	Released: September 9, 2022; Label: Truss Records; Format: Download, Streaming

=== Singles ===
List of singles and peak chart positions
Single	Year	Peak chart positions				Certifications	Album
Single	Year	US Christ	US Christ Air.	US Christ AC	US Christ Digital	Certifications	Album
"From The Day"	2014	26	25	25	40		I Am They
"We Are Yours"	2015	—	38	—	—		I Am They
"Make A Way" (radio version)	2016	—	43	—	—		I Am They
"Crown Him"	2017	—	43	—	—		Trial & Triumph
"My Feet Are on the Rock"	2018	23	16	15	—		Trial & Triumph
"Scars"	2018	4	2	2	5	RIAA: Gold	Trial & Triumph
"No Impossible with You"	2019	20	15	12	—		Trial & Triumph
"White Christmas"	2019	—	31	26	—		non-album single
"Faithful God"	2020	19	20	14	—		Faithful God
"Promises"	2021	—	25	27	—		Faithful God

=== Promotional singles ===
Separate from their standard singles released to radio, the band has released numerous worship songs with session music videos. They have typically been covers, but not exclusively.

List of singles and peak chart positions
Single	Year	Album	Original artist
"No Longer Slaves"	2016	Resting Place (EP)	Bethel Music
"Resting Place (To the Cross)"	2016	Resting Place (EP)	I Am They
"Reckless Love"	2018	non-album single	Cory Asbury
"Tremble"	2018	non-album single	Mosaic MSC
"Christ Be Magnified"	2021	non-album single	Cody Carnes
