= These Same Skies =

2021 live album by Hillsong Worship

Live album by Hillsong Worship
- Released: 5 November 2021
- Recorded: 2 September 2021
- Venue: Saddleback Church, Orange County, California, U.S.
- Genre: Contemporary worship music
- Label: Hillsong Music; Capitol CMG
- Producer: Brooke Ligertwood; Michael Guy Chislett

Hillsong Worship live album chronology
There Is More (2018)	These Same Skies (2021)

Hillsong Worship chronology
At Easter (EP) (2021)	These Same Skies (2021)	Team Night (2022)

Singles from These Same Skies
- 1. "Hope of the Ages" Released: 20 August 2021

These Same Skies is the 27th live album by Australian worship group Hillsong Worship. The album was released on 5 November 2021 by Hillsong Music and Capitol CMG. The album features appearances by Benjamin Hastings, Mi-kaisha Rose, Reuben Morgan, Brooke Ligertwood, Aodhan King, and Saye Pratt. Production was handled by Brooke Ligertwood and Michael Guy Chislett.

These Same Skies was preceded by the release of "Hope of the Ages" as the lead single from the album, with "Never Walk Alone" and "That's The Power" being released as promotional singles.

These Same Skies debuted at number fifteen on Billboard's Top Christian Albums Chart in the United States, as well as the Official Charts' Official Christian & Gospel Albums Chart in the United Kingdom.

== Background ==
On 8 October 2021, Hillsong Worship announced These Same Skies as their forthcoming album slated for release on 5 November 2021, being availed for digital pre-order. These Same Skies was recorded in Orange County, California, marking the first Hillsong Worship project to be recorded entirely in the United States. Chris Davenport of Hillsong Worship shared the meaning behind the album's title, saying:

From the very beginning, the skies have displayed the glory of God. The skies over creation. The skies over the miracles of the Old Testament. The skies over the life, death, and resurrection of Jesus — these same skies are the ones we live and worship under today.

== Release and promotion ==
=== Singles ===
Hillsong Worship released a studio-recorded version of "Hope of the Ages" alongside Reuben Morgan and Cody Carnes on 20 August 2021.

=== Promotional singles ===
Hillsong Worship released "Never Walk Alone" featuring Mi-kaisha Rose as the first promotional single from the album on 8 October 2021.

Hillsong Worship released "That's The Power" featuring Benjamin Hastings as the second promotional single from the album on 22 October 2021.

== Critical reception ==
Professional ratings
Review scores
Source	Rating
365 Days of Inspiring Media	4.5/5
The Christian Beat	4/5
JubileeCast	4.75/5

Joshua Andre in his 365 Days of Inspiring Media review gave a positive review of the album, saying: "These Same Skies is an album that needs to be listened to despite everything that happened to Hillsong the church." Christian Ellis of The Christian Beat concluded in his review that "Hillsong Worship’s These Same Skies reminds us that under the skies we live under, He’s still doing what only what He can do – making something good out of us." JubileeCast's Timothy Yap gave a favourable review of the album, saying: "Hillsong Worship is such a mainstay in contemporary worship music that you can always count on them delivering church-friendly songs. This one's no exception. It's full of songs ready to serve the church in the honor of our Lord Jesus Christ." Reviewing for NewReleaseToday, Kevin Davis opined that "These Same Skies is loaded with several stirring new worship songs that really set me in the proper mindset to praise God for loving me so much that He gave His life away for all that was lost. I really enjoy the exciting musical vibe of this album, and the melodies are catchy, and the lyrics are prayerful."

=== Accolades ===
Year-end lists
Publication	Accolade	Rank	Ref.
NewReleaseToday	Best of 2021: Top 10 Albums of the Year	—	
JubileeCast	Best Christian Albums of 2021	9	

== Commercial performance ==
In the United States, These Same Skies debuted at number fifteen on the Top Christian Albums Chart

In the United Kingdom, These Same Skies debuted on the OCC's Official Christian & Gospel Albums Chart at number fifteen.

== Track listing ==
These Same Skies
No.	Title	Writer(s)	Length
1.	"That’s the Power" (featuring Benjamin Hastings)	Alexander Pappas; Benjamin Hastings; Michael Fatkin	4:35
2.	"That’s the Power (Reprise)" (featuring Benjamin Hastings)	Pappas; Hastings; Fatkin	2:23
3.	"Surrounds Me" (featuring Mi‐kaisha Rose)	Reuben Morgan; Sarah Griffiths	3:39
4.	"Freedom" (featuring Reuben Morgan)	Joshua Grimmett; Morgan	4:17
5.	"Hope of the Ages" (featuring Reuben Morgan)	Morgan; Cody Carnes	6:37
6.	"Never Walk Alone" (featuring Mi‐kaisha Rose)	Ben Fielding; Hannah Hobbs; Jenn Johnson	5:49
7.	"Resurrender" (featuring Brooke Ligertwood)	Brooke Ligertwood; Chris Davenport	7:02
8.	"Secret Place" (featuring Chris Davenport)	Chris Davenport	5:28
9.	"Waiting (Spontaneous)" (featuring Brooke Ligertwood)	Ligertwood; Davenport	7:28
10.	"Song for His Presence" (featuring Aodhan King and Saye Pratt)	Aodhan King; Ben Tan; Karina Savage; Melodie Wagner	7:35
11.	"All to Him" (featuring Joel Houston)	Joel Houston	7:08
Total length:			62:00

== Personnel ==
Vocals

- Brooke Ligertwood – lead vocals, acoustic guitar, piano
- Reuben Morgan – lead vocals, acoustic guitar
- Joel Houston – lead vocals, acoustic guitar
- Chris Davenport – lead vocals, acoustic guitar, piano
- Benjamin Hastings – lead vocals, guitars
- Aodhan King – lead vocals
- Mi-kaisha Rose – lead vocals
- Saye Pratt – lead vocals

Musicians

- Michael Guy Chislett – producer, electric guitar
- Dylan Thomas – electric guitar
- Dan McMurray – drums

== Charts ==
Chart performance for These Same Skies
Chart (2021)	Peak position
UK Christian & Gospel Albums (OCC)	15
US Christian Albums (Billboard)	15

== Release history ==
Release history and formats for These Same Skies
Region	Date	Format(s)	Label(s)	Ref.
Various	5 November 2021	Digital download; streaming	Hillsong Music; Capitol CMG	
Various	3 December 2021	CD	Hillsong Music; Capitol CMG	
