= Ain't Nobody (disambiguation) =

"Ain't Nobody" is a 1983 song by Rufus and Chaka Khan. It has been covered many times, including by LL Cool J, and mixed by Felix Jaehn.

Ain't Nobody may also refer to:

- "Ain't Nobody" (Cody Carnes song), 2022
- "Ain't Nobody" (Faith Evans song), 1995
- "Ain't Nobody" (Monica song), 1996
- "Ain't Nobody", song by Clare Maguire from her album Light After Dark, 2011
- "Ain't Nobody", song by the band Clover, 1977
- "Ain't Nobody", song by Terri Gibbs, 1985
- "Ain't Nobody", song by KT Tunstall, 2007
- "Ain't Nobody", song by KStewart, 2015
