= Colony House (band) =

American indie rock band

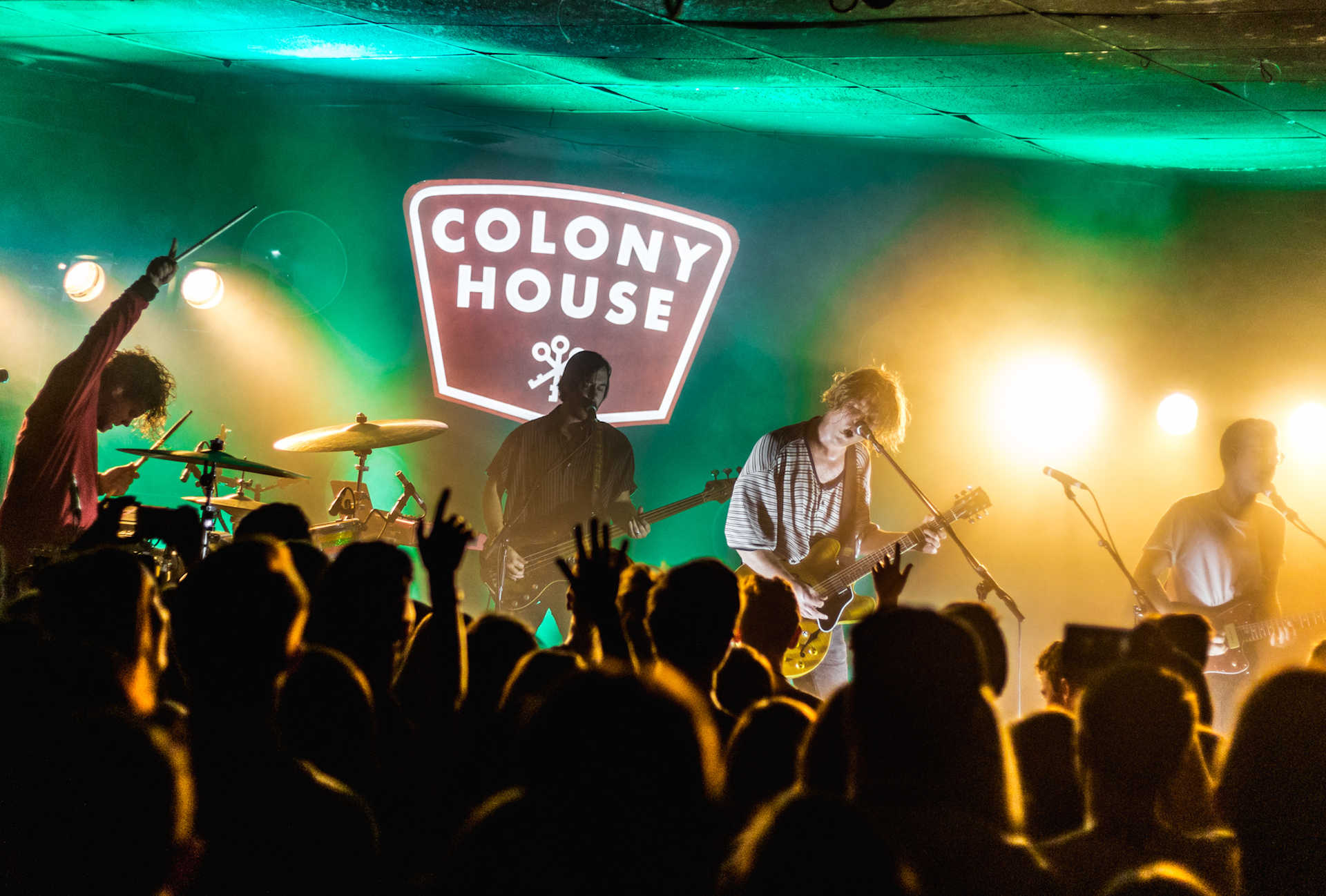
- Colony House performing in 2018. L to R: Will Chapman, Parke Cottrell, Caleb Chapman and Scott Mills.

Background information
- Origin: Franklin, Tennessee, U.S.
- Genre: Indie rock
- Years active: 2009–present
- Labels: Descendant, RCA, Roon
- Members: Caleb Chapman; Will Chapman; Scott Mills; Parke Cottrell
- Website: colonyhousemusic.com

Colony House is an American indie rock band from Franklin, Tennessee. Their debut album, When I Was Younger, reached No. 154 on the Billboard 200 and No. 3 on the Heatseekers Albums chart.

== Background ==
Natives of Franklin, Tennessee, the band is composed of brothers Caleb Chapman (born October 2, 1989) (vocals) and Will Chapman (born February 6, 1991) (drums), guitarist Scott Mills, and bassist Parke Cottrell. Caleb and Will are the sons of contemporary Christian musician, Steven Curtis Chapman. The band began working together while in high school in 2009. They have described their sound as "rock n' roll" with "stripped-down instruments", influenced by U2 and Cold War Kids. Originally named Caleb, they changed the name to Colony House in 2013, after an apartment complex where they had lived. They self-released three EPs, before releasing their debut album, When I Was Younger, on July 22, 2014. The band made their television debut on September 29, 2014, on NBC's Late Night with Seth Meyers.

Colony House's second studio album, Only the Lonely, released on January 13, 2017. The singles released off the album were "You Know It", "Lonely", "You & I" and "This Beautiful Life". The album charted at No. 76 on the Billboard 200 charts. The band then went on a headlining tour in support of the album with guests Deep Sea Diver and Knox Hamilton. In addition, they opened for Switchfoot's Native Tongue tour in 2019, along with Tyson Motsenbocker.

On September 9, 2019, the group announced the title of their third album, Leave What's Lost Behind. Three singles were released in advance of the album: "Looking for Some Light," "Original Material," and "Where I'm From." Leave What's Lost Behind was released on January 24, 2020. An acoustic version of the albums leading track "Looking for Some Light" was released a few months later on April 1, 2020. Shortly after the release of the album, Colony House announced a nationwide "Leave What's Lost Behind Tour," with Tyson Motsenbocker, scheduled to run through the end of March 2020. The tour was postponed halfway through due to the COVID-19 pandemic, and later completely cancelled.

Over the course of 2020, Colony House released a number of music videos and acoustic performances all filmed in the midwest. "When the Walls Come Crashing Down" that featured Jon Foreman and Jillian Edwards was released on June 12, 2020. On October 10 and 11, 2020, they performed two back-to-back socially distanced drive-in concerts in their hometown of Franklin, Tennessee. At the drive-in concert, Colony House premiered their film Everybody is Looking for Some Light. The film was part live concert, part documentary, and part music video, was made available as a streaming event on March 20, 2021. A live album, Colony House Live, Vol. 1, was released on January 29, 2021. Colony House's film "Everybody is Looking For Some Light" was made available as a streaming event on March 20, 2021.

On April 20, 2021, Colony House released the single "O YA". A couple months later, on June 1, 2021, Colony House Announced the "Back Before You Know It Tour". This tour had Fleurie as a special guest, and was scheduled to run from September 10 to November 27, 2021, covering almost the entirety of North America. The band released their long-anticipated single "Lights On" on June 18, 2021. On July 23, 2021, the band released "Automatic" featuring Fleurie which was their final single from Rotten Tomatoes. Rotten Tomatoes was released on September 10, 2020. The "Back Before You Know it Tour" began on September 10, 2021, in Knoxville, Tennessee.

On September 15, 2022, Colony House Released "Cannonballers". The music video for the song was released the following day.

== Discography ==
=== Studio albums ===
List of albums, with selected chart positions
Title	Details	Peak chart positions		
Title	Details	US	US Indie	US Rock
When I Was Younger	Released: July 22, 2014; Label: Descendant Records; Formats: CD, digital download, LP	154	34	—
Only the Lonely	Released: January 13, 2017; Label: RCA Records; Formats: CD, digital download, LP	76	—	7
Leave What's Lost Behind	Released: January 24, 2020; Label: Roon Records; Formats: CD, digital download, LP	—	—	—
The Cannonballers	Released: February 3, 2023; Label: Roon Records; Formats: CD, digital download, LP	—	—	—
77	Released: September 5, 2025 (part 1), February 13, 2026 (part 2)	—	—	—
"—" denotes a recording that did not chart or was not released in that territory.

=== Live albums ===
List of Live Albums
Title	Details
Colony House Live, Vol. 1	Released: January 29, 2021; Label: Roon Records; Formats: CD, digital download, LP,

=== Extended plays ===
List of Extended Plays
Titles	Details
To the Ends of the World	Released: November 22, 2011; Label: Caleb; Format: digital download
The Younger - EP	Released: February 12, 2016; Label: Descendant Records; Format: digital download
Rotten Tomatoes	Released: September 10, 2021; Label: Roon Records; Format: digital download
Every Christmas EP	Released: December 6, 2024; Label: Roon Records; Format: digital download

=== Singles ===
List of singles, showing year released and album name
Title	Year	Peak chart positions	Album
Title	Year	US Alt.	Album
"Silhouttes"	2013	—	When I Was Younger
"You Know It"	2016	—	Only The Lonely
"You & I"	2016	—	Only The Lonely
"Lonely"	2016	—	Only The Lonely
"This Beautiful Life"	2016	—	Only The Lonely
"Looking For Some Light"	2019	—	Leave What's Lost Behind
"Original Material"	2019	—	Leave What's Lost Behind
"Where I'm From"	2020	—	Leave What's Lost Behind
"When the Walls Come Crashing Down" _{(featuring Jon Foreman and Jillian Edwards)}	2020	—	non-album single
"O Ya"	2021	—	Rotten Tomatoes - EP
"Lights On"	2021	—	Rotten Tomatoes - EP
"Automatic"_{(featuring Fleurie)}	2021	—	Rotten Tomatoes - EP
"Cannonballers"	2022	11	The Cannonballers
"Landlocked Surf Rock"	2022	—	The Cannonballers
"One of Those Days"	2022	—	The Cannonballers
"Telephone Pole"	2025	—	77

=== Notes ===
^ "To the Ends of the World" was released under the previous band name Caleb.

== Members ==
- Caleb Chapman – lead vocals, guitars
- Will Chapman – drums, backing vocals
- Scott Mills – guitars, bass, backing vocals
- Parke Cottrell – bass, backing vocals, keyboards, cowbell
