= Run to the Father (song) =

2021 song by Cody Carnes

Single by Cody Carnes

from the album Run to the Father
- Released: July 26, 2019
- Recorded: 2018
- Genre: Contemporary worship music
- Length: 5:08
- Label: Sparrow; Capitol CMG
- Songwriters: Cody Carnes; Matt Maher; Ran Jackson
- Producer: David Leonard

Cody Carnes singles chronology
"Heaven Fall" (2019)	"Run to the Father" (2019)	"Christ Be Magnified" (2019)

Music videos
- "Run to the Father" (Live) on YouTube
- "Run to the Father" (Lyrics) on YouTube

"Run to the Father" is a song by American Contemporary Christian musician and worship leader Cody Carnes. The song was released on July 26, 2019, as the third single from his second studio album, Run to the Father (2020). Carnes co-wrote the song with Matt Maher and Ran Jackson. David Leonard produced the single.

"Run to the Father" peaked at No. 23 on the US Hot Christian Songs chart.

== Background ==
"Run to the Father" was Cody Carnes' third single of 2019, following the release of "Nothing Else" and "Heaven Fall". Carnes shared the story behind the song with FreeCCM.

== Composition ==
"Run to the Father" is composed in the key of C with a tempo of 68.5 beats per minute and a musical time signature of 6/8.

== Critical reception ==
Jonathan Andre of 365 Days of Inspiring Media gave a positive review of the song, saying "Thematically and stylistically, the song is quite possibly one of his most mellow, as we contemplate the words sung by Cody about running to the father as we are." Lins Honeyman, in a favourable review at Cross Rhythms, said "this is a stirring piece which ticks all the modern worship boxes from the mid-tempo setting to the self-examining and emotional lyrics - all of which benefit from Carnes' skilled and impassioned vocal delivery."

== Commercial performance ==
"Run to the Father" debuted at No. 36 on the US Hot Christian Songs chart dated August 10, 2019, concurrently charting at No. 14 on the Christian Digital Song Sales chart. The song went on to peak at No. 23 on the Hot Christian Songs chart.

== Music videos ==
The lyric video of "Run to the Father" was published on July 26, 2019, on Cody Carnes' YouTube channel. The live music video of the song, performed by Cody Carnes, recorded at Motion Conference, was published on August 30, 2019, on Cody Carnes' YouTube channel.

== Track listing ==
"Run to the Father"
No.	Title	Writer(s)	Producer	Length
1.	"Run to the Father"	Cody Carnes; Matt Maher; Ran Jackson	David Leonard	5:08

"Run to the Father" — EP
No.	Title	Producer(s)	Length
1.	"Run to the Father" (Radio Version)	Colby Wedgeworth; The Creak Music	4:21
2.	"Run to the Father"	David Leonard	5:08
3.	"Run to the Father" (Live from Motion Conference)	Cody Carnes; The Creak Music	9:20
4.	"Run to the Father" (Voice Memo)	Cody Carnes	5:39
Total length:			24:29

== Credits ==
Single credits adapted from Tidal.

- Cody Carnes — primary artist
- Jeremy SH Griffith — mixing
- Drew Lavyne — mastering engineer
- David Leonard — producer

EP credits adapted from Tidal.

- Jesse Brock — mixing assistant (track 1)
- Cody Carnes — primary artist (tracks 1–4), producer (tracks 3–4)
- Max Corwin — mastering engineer (track 3)
- The Creak Music — producer (tracks 1 & 3)
- Alex Dobbert — mastering engineer (track 4)
- Jeremy Edwardson — mixing (track 3)
- Jeremy SH Griffith — mixing (track 2)
- David Leonard — producer (track 2)
- Drew Lavyne — mastering engineer (tracks 1–3)
- Sean Moffit — mixing (track 1)
- Colby Wedgeworth — producer (track 1)

== Charts ==
=== Weekly charts ===
Weekly chart performance for "Run to the Father"
Chart (2019–2020)	Peak position
US Christian Songs (Billboard)	23
US Christian Airplay (Billboard)	25
US Christian AC (Billboard)	22

=== Year-end charts ===
Year-end chart performance for "Run to the Father"
Chart (2019)	Position
US Christian Songs (Billboard)	99
Chart (2020)	Position
US Christian Songs (Billboard)	67

== Certifications ==
Region	Certification	Certified units/sales
United States (RIAA)	Gold	500,000^{‡}
^{‡} Sales+streaming figures based on certification alone.

== Release history ==
Region	Date	Version	Format	Label	Ref.
Various	July 26, 2019	Single	Digital download; streaming	Sparrow Records	
Various	January 24, 2020	EP	Digital download; streaming	Sparrow Records	
