= Here as in Heaven (song) =

2016 song by Elevation Worship

Song by Elevation Worship

from the album Here as in Heaven
- Released: February 5, 2016
- Recorded: July 2015
- Venue: Time Warner Cable Arena, Charlotte, North Carolina, U.S.
- Genre: Contemporary worship music
- Length: 8:19
- Label: Essential Worship
- Songwriters: Chris Brown; Mack Brock; Matthews Ntlele; Steven Furtick; Wade Joye
- Producers: Steven Furtick; Mack Brock; Aaron Robertson

Music videos
- "Here as in Heaven" (Acoustic) on YouTube
- "Here as in Heaven" (Live) on YouTube

"Here as in Heaven" is a song performed by American contemporary worship band Elevation Worship. The song was released as the opening track of the fifth live album of the same name on February 5, 2016. The song was written by Chris Brown, Mack Brock, Matthews Ntlele, Steven Furtick, and Wade Joye.

"Here as in Heaven" debuted at No. 17 on the US Hot Christian Songs chart despite not being released as an official single. It has been certified platinum by Recording Industry Association of America (RIAA).

== Composition ==
"Here as in Heaven" is composed in the key of D with a tempo of 69.5 beats per minute, and a musical time signature of 4/4.

== Commercial performance ==
"Here as in Heaven" debuted at No. 17 on the US Hot Christian Songs chart dated February 27, 2016, concurrently charting at No. 8 on the Christian Digital Song Sales chart. The song spent 21 weeks on the Hot Christian Songs chart.

== Music videos ==
On November 13, 2015, Elevation Worship published the acoustic performance video of "Here as in Heaven" on YouTube. On February 5, 2016, Elevation Worship released the official live music video of "Here as in Heaven" on YouTube. It was recorded live at Time Warner Cable Arena in Charlotte, North Carolina, in July 2015.

== Charts ==
Chart performance for "Here as in Heaven"
Chart (2016)	Peak position
US Hot Christian Songs (Billboard)	17

== Certifications ==
Region	Certification	Certified units/sales
New Zealand (RMNZ)	Gold	15,000^{‡}
United States (RIAA)	Platinum	1,000,000^{‡}
^{‡} Sales+streaming figures based on certification alone.

== Other versions ==
- Kari Jobe released her own rendition of the song which featured Cody Carnes on the deluxe edition of her album, The Garden (2017).
