= The Garden (Kari Jobe album) =

Studio album by Kari Jobe
- Released: February 3, 2017
- Recorded: 2016
- Studio: The Soundhouse (Redding, California): Sound Emporium (Nashville, Tennessee); Roswick Studios (Franklin, Tennessee)
- Genre: Contemporary worship music
- Length: 58:40
- Label: Sparrow, KAJE
- Producer: Jeremy Edwardson

Kari Jobe chronology
Majestic: Revisited (2015)	The Garden (2017)	The Blessing (2020)

Singles from Kari Jobe
- 1. "The Cause of Christ" Released: November 4, 2016; 2. "Heal Our Land" Released: December 2, 2016; 3. "Let Your Glory Fall" Released: February 3, 2017

The Garden is the fifth studio album by Kari Jobe. The album was released on February 3, 2017 by Sparrow Records alongside KAJE, LLC. Jeremy Edwardson worked on the production of the album.

== Background ==
Kari Jobe, according to an article on The Christian Post website, took to Instagram to explain inspiration behind the album and the significance of the album's title track, "The Garden", saying:

The Garden song is truly one of the most intimate songs I've ever written. It's a song that captures the raw emotion of truth. Truth of pain and sorrow that feels like it could swallow you up and suffocate you. There are moments we experience in life that knock the wind out of us and may cause us to question exactly what God is up to. God used a garden in my back yard to help me remember that He is always at work to turn extremely difficult situations into beauty. Everything we do in this life, on this side of heaven, is Kingdom oriented. There will always be pruning, planting, watering and growth. Different seasons have different experiences- but God is always up to something beautiful.

– Kari Jobe, via Instagram

With regards to the song, "The Garden", Jobe also said it was to honor her sister, who had a stillborn daughter when she was seven-and-a-half months pregnant.

== Singles ==
On November 4, 2016, "The Cause of Christ" was released as the lead single of the album. Another single, "Heal Our Land", was released on December 2, 2016. The third single from The Garden, "Let Your Glory Fall", was released on February 3, 2017.

== Reception ==
=== Critical response ===
Professional ratings
Review scores
Source	Rating
365 Days Of Inspiring Media	4.5/5 stars
CCM Magazine	4.5/5 stars
The Christian Beat	4.5/5 stars
Cross Rhythms	9/10 squares
Jesus Freak Hideout	4/5 stars

The Garden was met with positive reception from various critics. Joshua Andre of 365 Days Of Inspiring Media rated the album four and a half stars, saying "If you haven’t had the pleasure of listening to Kari Jobe’s albums before and are not sure whether to give her music a go, then I would say The Garden is the best way to start,". The four and a half star rating awarded by CCM Magazine’s Matt Conner was reasoned out of a belief that "The Garden speaks from a wide emotional range with the sort of quiet intensity for which Jobe is known" and that it "is an honest album from a trusted artist destined to be a friend at our weakest moments. " At The Christian Beat, Chris Major rated the album four out of five stars, saying "The diverse sounds and meaningful themes of The Garden make this collection stand out amongst Kari Jobe's work, if not in the praise and worship music community. From calm and contemplative moments of worship to rising, hopeful expressions of trust, each track is impactful." Giving the album nine squares out of a possible ten at Cross Rhythms, Tony Cummings concludes, "wherever you look on this set you'll hear a great voice passionately singing heart-warming songs." Indicating in a four star review from Jesus Freak Hideout, Nicole Marie Vacca writes, "Kari Jobe's The Garden is a moving, almost mesmerizing ode to God, making it perfect for times of personal worship and waiting on the Lord. "

=== Awards and accolades ===
On August 9, 2017, it was announced that The Garden would be nominated for a GMA Dove Award in the Worship Album of the Year and the Recorded Music Packaging of the Year categories at the 48th Annual GMA Dove Awards.

== Commercial performance ==
The Garden made its debut on Billboard Christian Albums chart at No. 2 with 19,000 equivalent album units sold as of February 16, 2017.

On October 17, 2017, The Garden won the GMA Dove Award for Recorded Music Packaging of the Year with Kari Jobe alongside art producers Ezra Cohen, Jillian Cohen and Lindsey Pruitt as well as photographer Cameron Powell being the receipts at a ceremony at Allen Arena in Nashville, Tennessee.

== Track listing ==
Standard edition
No.	Title	Writer(s)	Length
1.	"The Garden"	Amanda Cook, Kari Jobe Carnes, Cody Carnes, Jacob Cook	5:39
2.	"Let Your Glory Fall"	Brooke Ligertwood, C. Carnes, K. J. Carnes, Scott Ligertwood	4:43
3.	"Heal Our Land"	K. J. Carnes, C. Carnes, B. Ligertwood, S. Ligertwood	5:00
4.	"Lover of My Soul"	C. Carnes, K. J. Carnes, Martin Smith	4:49
5.	"Speak to Me"	A. Cook, K. J. Carnes, C. Carnes, J. Cook	7:39
6.	"Fall Afresh"	K. J. Carnes, Sarah Reeves, Henry Seeley	5:29
7.	"I Will Sing"	Ben Fielding, Jason Ingram, K. J. Carnes	4:32
8.	"Miracles"	Chris Quilala, Joshua Silverberg, Dustin Smith, Stuart Garrard	5:46
9.	"Closer to Your Heart" (featuring Cody Carnes)	K. J. Carnes, C. Carnes, H. Seeley, Alex Seeley, Reeves	5:05
10.	"Oh the Power"	C. Carnes, Silverberg, K. J. Carnes, Mia Fieldes	5:01
11.	"The Cause of Christ"	K. J. Carnes, Ben Hastings, Bryan Fowler	4:57
Total length:			58:40

Deluxe edition
No.	Title	Writer(s)	Length
12.	"Here as in Heaven" (featuring Cody Carnes)	Chris Brown, Mack Brock, Matthews Ntlele, Steven Furtick, Wade Joye	6:47
13.	"Come Alive"	C. Carnes, Jacob Sooter, K. J. Carnes, Lindsey Sweat	4:48
14.	"On the Throne"	Jon Egan, Ingram, K. J. Carnes	4:22
Total length:			74:37

== Personnel ==
- Kari Jobe – vocals, backing vocals
- Jeremy Edwardson – keyboards, programming
- Trey Gunn – keyboards, programming
- Andrew Jackson – keyboards, programming
- Tore Kulleseid – keyboards, programming, acoustic guitars, electric guitars
- Daniel James Mackenzie – keyboards, programming, bass
- Ian McIntosh – keyboards, programming
- Grant Pittman – acoustic piano
- Hank Bentley – electric guitars
- Jonathan Berlin – electric guitars
- Jeffrey Knude – acoustic guitars
- Austin Davis – drums, percussion
- David Whitworth – drums, percussion
- Jeremy Larson – cello, viola, violin
- Lewis Patzner – cello
- Anton Patzner – viola, violin
- Cody Carnes – backing vocals, vocals (9, 12)
- Daniella Mason – backing vocals

=== Production ===
- Christopher York – A&R
- Jeremy Edwardson – producer, engineer
- Daniella Mason – vocal producer
- Andrew Jackson – engineer
- Ryan Mohr – engineer
- Jeremy SH Griffith – mixing
- Drew Lavyne – mastering at ALL Digital Mastering (New York, NY)
- Ezra Cohen – art direction
- Jillian Cohen – art direction
- Lindsey Pruitt – art direction, graphic design
- Cameron Powell – photography

== Charts ==
=== Album ===
Chart (2017)	Peak position
Canadian Albums (Billboard)	75
UK Album Downloads (OCC)	62
UK Christian & Gospel Albums (OCC)	1
US Billboard 200	22
US Top Christian Albums (Billboard)	2
US Digital Albums (Billboard)	6

=== Singles ===
Year	Single	Peak positions		
Year	Single	US Christian	US Christian Airplay	US Christian Digital Songs
2017	"The Cause of Christ"	29	—	10
2017	"Heal Our Land"	27	—	—
2017	"Let Your Glory Fall"	33	34	—

== Release history ==
Region	Date	Version	Format	Label	Ref.
Worldwide	February 3, 2017	Standard	CD; Digital download; Streaming	Sparrow Records; KAJE, LLC	
Worldwide	February 3, 2017	Deluxe	CD; Digital download; Streaming	Sparrow Records; KAJE, LLC	
