= Run to the Father =

2020 studio album by Cody Carnes

Studio album by Cody Carnes
- Released: March 13, 2020
- Recorded: 2018–2020
- Genre: Worship; CCM
- Length: 52:55
- Label: Sparrow; Capitol CMG
- Producer: Hank Bentley; Cody Carnes; The Creak Music; Austin Davis; Jeremy Edwardson; Jeremy S.H. Griffith; David Leonard; Dan Mackenzie; Jacob Sooter; McKendree Tucker; Colby Wedgeworth

Cody Carnes chronology
The Darker the Night / The Brighter the Morning (2017)	Run to the Father (2020)	God Is Good! (2022)

Alternative cover
- Deluxe cover

Singles from Run to the Father
- 1. "Nothing Else" Released: January 4, 2019; 2. "Heaven Fall" Released: March 8, 2019; 3. "Run to the Father" Released: July 26, 2019; 4. "Christ Be Magnified" Released: January 1, 2020

Run to the Father is the second studio album by American contemporary Christian musician Cody Carnes. The album was released on March 13, 2020, via Capitol Christian Music Group. The deluxe edition of the album was released on February 5, 2021. Carnes collaborated with Hank Bentley, The Creak Music, Austin Davis, Jeremy Edwardson, Jeremy S.H. Griffith, David Leonard, Dan Mackenzie, Jacob Sooter, McKendree Tucker, and Colby Wedgeworth in the production of the album.

Run to the Father was supported by the release of four singles: "Nothing Else", "Heaven Fall", the title track, and "Christ Be Magnified". "Nothing Else" peaked at No. 31 on the US Hot Christian Songs chart. "Run to the Father" peaked at No. 23 on the Hot Christian Songs chart. "Christ Be Magnified" peaked at No. 45 on the Hot Christian Songs chart.

The album drew mixed reactions from the critics. The album debuted at No. 12 on the Billboard's Top Christian Albums Chart in the United States. Run to the Father was nominated for the Grammy Award for Best Contemporary Christian Music Album at the 2021 Grammy Awards.

== Background ==
On March 2, 2020, Carnes that his second studio album, Run to the Father, was slated for release on March 13, 2020. The album marked his follow-up to his debut studio album, The Darker the Night / The Brighter the Morning (2017). The album also represents Carnes' return to his worship-leading roots. Carnes collaborated with venerated songwriters in worship music, such Matt Maher, Ran Jackson, Cory Asbury, Ethan Hulse, Steffany Gretzinger, Stefan Cashwill, and Passion's Kristian Stanfill and Brett Younker. Carnes shared the vision of the album, saying:

The main vision I felt God show me for this new album (and spoke it through Johnny Cash in a dream – no joke) was to go back to where I'm most comfortable and to let the songs play themselves the way they wrote themselves. For me, I feel most at home leading worship and sitting at a piano. And these songs feel very similar live to how they were written – me at a piano or guitar encountering God. Also, I think the lyrics are deeper and more raw.

== Release and promotion ==
On January 4, 2019, Cody Carnes released "Nothing Else" as a single. "Nothing Else" peaked at No. 31 on the US Hot Christian Songs chart.

Carnes released his second single of the year, "Heaven Fall", on March 8, 2019.

On July 26, 2019, Carnes released "Run to the Father" as a single. "Run to the Father" peaked at No. 23 on the US Hot Christian Songs chart.

Carnes released "Christ Be Magnified" as the fourth single from the album on January 1, 2020. "Christ Be Magnified" debuted at No. 45 on the US Hot Christian Songs chart.

== Reception ==
=== Critical response ===
Professional ratings
Review scores
Source	Rating
365 Days of Inspiring Media	4.5/5
Jesus Freak Hideout	2/5 stars
JubileeCast	3.5/5
Today's Christian Entertainment	4.2/5 stars

Run to the Father has garnered mixed reviews from critics of CCM and contemporary worship music genres.

Jonathan Andre in his 365 Days of Inspiring Media review praised Carnes' work on the album, for being "able to shape and reshape the view of how worship music should look like to not only people within the 4 walls of the church, but to those outside it as well. And for that I am grateful for his music." Mercedes Rich, indicating in a positive review of the album at Today's Christian Entertainment, said "This album has many other strong tracks, both lyrically and instrumentally. Carnes is not afraid to say the name of Jesus in his songs and remembers the strong importance of simplicity." Paul Delger gave a favourable review of the album for The Banner, saying "The album’s music is reflective, praiseworthy and comforting, while the sound offers an anthemic and pop feel. This record will not disappoint listeners searching for immersive, substantial praise music."

Jesus Freak Hideout's Chase Tremaine gave a negative review of the album, opined that "the songs oscillate between the laudable and the laughable," while berating Carnes' songwriting abilities. Timothy Yap of JubileeCast praised the album for being a welcome departure from the electronic sounds of his debut album, but also bemoaned that most tracks are "piano-based ballads" and Carnes' songwriting, saying "Carnes does have the potential to write excellent songs, but he's not experienced enough to write an entire album's worth of them."

=== Accolades ===
Awards
Year	Organization	Award	Result	Ref
2021	Grammy Awards	Best Contemporary Christian Music Album	Nominated	

== Commercial performance ==
In the United States, Run to the Father debuted at number twelve on the Billboard's Top Christian Albums Chart dated March 28, 2020.

== Track listing ==
Run to the Father — Standard edition
No.	Title	Writer(s)	Producer(s)	Length
1.	"Run to the Father"	Cody Carnes; Matt Maher; Ran Jackson	David Leonard	5:08
2.	"Christ Be Magnified"	Ethan Hulse; Carnes; Cory Asbury	Jeremy Edwardson	5:02
3.	"Nothing Else"	Carnes; Hank Bentley; Jessie Early	Austin Davis; Cody Carnes; McKendree Tucker	6:33
4.	"Let the Light In"	Brett Younker; Carnes; Kristian Stanfill	Austin Davis; Cody Carnes	5:49
5.	"Power in the Blood"	Carnes; Stanfill; Traditional (Public Domain)	Dan Mackenzie; Hank Bentley	5:58
6.	"All My Delight"	Ben Cantelon; Carnes; Justin Amundrud; Lauren Strahm	Austin Davis	3:56
7.	"Death of Death"	Chris Kuti; Carnes; Dameon Aranda; JT Murrell; Mitch Wong; Stephen Cole	Jacob Sooter	5:08
8.	"Heaven Fall"	Carnes; Matt Hammitt; Seth Mosley	David Leonard	5:03
9.	"The Vow"	Carnes; Stefan Cashwell; Steffany Gretzinger	Jeremy S.H. Griffith	5:53
10.	"Run to the Father" (radio version)	Carnes; Maher; Jackson	Colby Wedgeworth; The Creak Music	4:21
Total length:				52:55

Run to the Father — Apple Music bonus video content
No.	Title	Length
11.	"Run to the Father" (lyric video/live from Motion Conference, Birmingham, Alabama/2019)	9:16
12.	"Nothing Else" (live from Passion, Atlanta, Georgia, 2019)	8:17
Total length:		70:24

Run to the Father — deluxe edition
No.	Title	Writer(s)	Producer(s)	Length
10.	"Christ Be Magnified" (live at Passion 2020)		Cody Carnes; Jeremy Edwardson	6:09
11.	"Let the Light In" (live at Worship Together 2020)		Austin Davis; Cody Carnes	8:44
12.	"Nothing Else" (live from Passion 2019)		Cody Carnes	8:21
13.	"Run to the Father" (live from Motion Conference)		Cody Carnes; The Creak Music	9:20
14.	"The Blessing" (live from Home)	Chris Brown; Carnes; Kari Jobe; Steven Furtick	Cody Carnes	8:31
15.	"Power in the Blood" (live from Home)		Cody Carnes	6:47
16.	"Run to the Father" (live from Home)		Cody Carnes	6:59
17.	"Christ Be Magnified" (live from Home)		Cody Carnes	7:20
18.	"Run to the Father" (radio version)			4:21
Total length:				115:02

Run to the Father — Apple Music deluxe bonus video content
No.	Title	Length
19.	"Christ Be Magnified" (live from Passion 2020)	8:42
20.	"Let the Light In" (live from Worship Together, Franklin, Tennessee/2020)	8:43
21.	"Nothing Else" (lyric video/live from Passion 2019)	8:17
22.	"Run to the Father" (lyric video/live from Motion Conference, Birmingham, Alabama/2019)	9:16
23.	"The Blessing" (live from Home)	8:27
Total length:		158:27

== Personnel ==
Credits adapted from AllMusic.

- Hank Bentley — producer
- Jonathan Berlin — mastering engineer
- Bob Boyd — mastering engineer
- Jesse Brock — mixing assistant
- Cody Carnes — primary artist, producer
- The Creak Music — producer
- Austin Davis — producer
- Jeremy Edwardson — producer
- Sam Gibson — mixing
- Jeremy S.H. Griffith — mixing, producer
- Drew Lavyne — mastering engineer
- David Leonard — producer
- Dan Mackenzie — producer
- Sean Moffitt — mixing
- Jacob Sooter — producer
- Seth Talley — mixing
- McKendree Tucker — producer
- Colby Wedgeworth — producer

== Charts ==
=== Weekly charts ===
Weekly chart performance for Run to the Father
Chart (2020)	Peak position
US Christian Albums (Billboard)	12

=== Year-end charts ===
Year-end chart performance for Run to the Father
Chart (2020)	Position
US Christian Albums (Billboard)	64
Chart (2023)	Position
US Christian Albums (Billboard)	87

== Release history ==
Region	Date	Version	Format	Label	Ref.
Various	March 13, 2020	Standard	CD; digital download; streaming	Sparrow Records; Capitol Christian Music Group	
Various	February 5, 2021	Deluxe	CD; digital download; streaming	Sparrow Records; Capitol Christian Music Group	
