= Christ Be Magnified =

2020 song by Cody Carnes

Single by Cody Carnes

from the album Run to the Father
- Released: January 1, 2020
- Recorded: 2019
- Genre: Contemporary worship music
- Length: 5:02
- Label: Sparrow; Capitol CMG
- Songwriters: Cody Carnes; Cory Asbury; Ethan Hulse
- Producer: Jeremy Edwardson

Cody Carnes singles chronology
"Run to the Father" (2019)	"Christ Be Magnified" (2020)	"The Blessing" (2020)

Lyric video
- "Christ Be Magnified" on YouTube

"Christ Be Magnified" is a song by American Christian musician Cody Carnes. The song was released on January 1, 2020, as the lead single from his second studio album, Run to the Father (2020). Carnes co-wrote the song with Cory Asbury and Ethan Hulse. Jeremy Edwardson produced the single.

"Christ Be Magnified" peaked at No. 45 on the US Hot Christian Songs chart.

== Background ==
Cody Carnes released "Christ Be Magnified" on January 1, 2020, debuting the song with a live performance at Passion 2020 held at the Mercedes-Benz Stadium in Atlanta. The song follows the release of 2019 singles "Nothing Else", "Heaven Fall" and "Run to the Father". Carnes shared the story behind the song with FreeCCM.

== Composition ==
"Christ Be Magnified" is composed in the key of A with a tempo of 72 beats per minute and a musical time signature of 4/4.

== Critical reception ==
Jonathan Andre of 365 Days of Inspiring Media gave a positive review of the song, describing the song as "sombre and reflective, heartfelt and true," further adding "Precise and articulate, Cody has made it a habit to produce songs for the church, and maybe, just maybe, 'Christ Be Magnified' can impact the church globally and locally in years to come." Jono Davies, reviewing for Louder Than The Music, said of the song: "This takes the listener into the throne room of Jesus, as cheesy as that sounds, it takes you that one step closer to God in worship. The song itself has a hymn like feel to it, yet without it sounding like a copy of a hymn. The song has a great chorus, actually a brilliant chorus, with verses that are strong and powerful to back it up." In a favourable review for Worship Leader, Randy Cross said of the single: "Another great song for the church. Easily singable by most congregations regardless of demographic. 'Christ Be Magnified' will be showing up in new song rotations all over the world very soon."

== Commercial performance ==
"Christ Be Magnified" debuted at No. 45 on the US Hot Christian Songs chart dated January 18, 2020.

== Music videos ==
The lyric video of "Christ Be Magnified" was published on January 1, 2020, on Cody Carnes' YouTube channel. The live music video of the song, performed by Cody Carnes, recorded at Worship Together Conference in Franklin, Tennessee, was published on April 10, 2020, on Cody Carnes' YouTube channel. On December 30, 2020, Carnes released the live performance video of the song recorded at Passion 2020, on YouTube.

== Credits ==
Credits adapted from Tidal.

- Cody Carnes — primary artist
- Jeremy Edwardson — producer
- Sam Gibson — mixing
- Drew Lavyne — mastering engineer

== Charts ==
Weekly chart performance for "Christ Be Magnified"
Chart (2020)	Peak position
US Christian Songs (Billboard)	45

== Release history ==
Region	Date	Format	Label	Ref.
Various	January 1, 2020	Digital download; streaming	Sparrow Records	

== Other versions ==
- Cory Asbury released "Christ Be Magnified" as a standalone single on February 28, 2020.
- I Am They released their rendition of the song as a standalone single.
- The Belonging Co released a version of the song featuring Cody Carnes on their live album, See the Light (2021).
