= Fresh Wind =

2021 single by Hillsong Worship

Single by Hillsong Worship
- Released: 22 January 2021
- Genre: Contemporary worship music
- Length: 4:33
- Label: Hillsong Music; Capitol CMG
- Songwriter(s): Ben Fielding; Matt Crocker; Brooke Ligertwood; David Ware
- Producer(s): Michael Guy Chislett; Brooke Ligertwood

Hillsong Worship singles chronology
"Awake My Soul" (2020)	"Fresh Wind" (2021)	"Hope of the Ages" (2021)

Music video
- "Fresh Wind" (Lyrics) on YouTube

"Fresh Wind" is a song performed by Australian praise and worship group Hillsong Worship. It was released as a single from their upcoming album on 22 January 2021. The song was written by Ben Fielding, Brooke Ligertwood, David Ware, and Matt Crocker. Michael Guy Chislett and Brooke Ligertwood handled the production of the single.

"Fresh Wind" peaked at No. 23 on the US Hot Christian Songs chart.

== Background ==
On 22 January 2021, Hillsong Worship released "Fresh Wind" as a single. The song features Brooke Ligertwood and David Ware as lead vocalists. Brooke Ligertwood shared the story behind the song in an interview with NewReleaseToday, saying:

Every February, our senior pastor brings vision and visionary language that frames our year. Last year, it was "wind of the Spirit, the fragrance of heaven." The weekend that our pastor started teaching from that framework, David Ware was leading worship. In rehearsal for service, he started spontaneously singing the section that's now the song's chorus. And, they performed it at the church service that evening. The rest of the song was wrestled throughout the remainder of the year. Some songs came quickly, others were labored over, prayed through, and came with no small amount of discomfort. This is the latter for sure. I think it needed to be this way so that the prayer could get in our spirits before it went beyond our own backyard. And, God being sovereign, I believe the song was ready right on time.

== Composition ==
"Fresh Wind" is composed in the key of C with a tempo of 63 beats per minute and a musical time signature of 4/4.

== Commercial performance ==
"Fresh Wind" debuted at number 23 on the US Hot Christian Songs chart dated 6 February 2021, concurrently debuting at number 12 on the Christian Digital Song Sales chart that same week.

== Music videos ==
Hillsong Worship released the audio video of "Fresh Wind", showcasing the single's artwork on YouTube on 22 January 2021. On 2 February 2021, the lyric video of the song was published by Hillsong Worship on their YouTube channel.

== Personnel ==
Credits adapted from AllMusic.

- Michael Guy Chislett — producer
- Sam Gibson — mixing
- Bruno Gruel — mastering engineer
- Hillsong Worship — primary artist
- Brooke Ligertwood — producer

== Charts ==
Chart (2021)	Peak position
New Zealand Hot Singles (Recorded Music NZ)	20
US Christian Songs (Billboard)	23

== Release history ==
Region	Date	Format	Label	Ref.
Various	22 January 2021	Digital download; streaming	Hillsong Music; Capitol Christian Music Group	
