= I Am They (album) =

Studio album by I Am They
- Released: January 27, 2015
- Genres: Contemporary worship music, folk rock
- Length: 39:46
- Label: Essential/Provident Label Group
- Producer: Jonathan Smith

I Am They is the first album by I Am They, released on January 27, 2015, on Essential Records.

== Reception ==
Professional ratings
Review scores
| Source | Rating |
|---|---|
| 365 Days of Inspiring Media | 4.5/5 stars |
| CCM Magazine | 3.5/5 stars |
| Christian Music Review | 4.6/5 |
| Christian Review Magazine | 4.5/5 stars |
| Cross Rhythms | 8/10 squares |
| Jesus Freak Hideout | 3/5 stars |
| Jesus Wired | 10/10 stars |
| New Release Tuesday | 3/5 stars |
| The Sound Opinion | 4/5 stars |

Grace S. Aspinwall, in a three and a half star review, wrote, "A grand collision of folk and worship, I Am They burst forth with a lively and intricate debut album... The Carson City based sextet succeeds on almost every front in their initial release and we can't wait to hear more." In a three star review by Jesus Freak Hideout, Roger Gelwicks wrote, "One listen of I Am They's debut reveals a band that's fully functional but not hitting on all cylinders... For now, I Am They's debut uncovers plenty of holes that experience, and a matured approach, can surely help to fill." Jonathan Francesco, in a three star review in New Release Tuesday, wrote, "While everything is good, solid, vertical worship, there's a little too much reliance on common buzz phrases in worship music... Given another album, this would be easy enough to correct, and the group displays the musical and vocal chops to carry stronger lyrics in the future." Rating the album an eight out of ten for Cross Rhythms, Chris Webb wrote, "Powerful vocals backed by deft interplay between guitars, violin and an occasional burst of banjo are the musical foundation stone of I Am They while their literate lyrics avoid most of the clichés."

Awarding the album four and a half stars from 365 Days of Inspiring Media, Jonathan Andre said they "create[d] a worship album worthy to be enjoyed by anyone who appreciates anything about worship, acoustic or even folk music." Lindsay Williams, awarding the album four stars from The Sound Opinion, wrote, "Rollicking foot-stomping abounds on every track. Raucous clapping is encouraged, and singing along is imminent." Rating the album a 4.6 out of five at Christian Music Review, Amanda Brogan says, "In every song, whether foot-stomping or hand-raising, I Am They's passion for the Savior is potent and tangible." Awarding the album ten stars for Jesus Wired, Rebekah Joy wrote that it is, "an incredible worship album". Writing a review for Christian Review Magazine, Leah St. John rated the album four and a half stars, and said, "The whole album exudes an unpretentious, intimate, and peaceful atmosphere."

== Track listing ==
| No. | Title | Writer(s) | Length |
|---|---|---|---|
| 1. | "We Are Yours" | Adam Palmer, Jason Ingram, Jonathan Smith, Matthew Hein, Stephanie Kulla | 3:34 |
| 2. | "Awake My Love" | Palmer, Hein, Kulla, Ingram, Smith | 2:43 |
| 3. | "Your Love Is Mine" | Palmer, Hein, Kulla, Casey Brown, Kipp Williams | 3:15 |
| 4. | "Over & Over Again" | Palmer, Smith, Hein, Kulla | 4:28 |
| 5. | "King of Love" | Palmer, Smith, Hein, Kulla, Stuart Garrard | 4:18 |
| 6. | "Even Me" | Palmer, Ingram, Smith, Hein, Kulla | 3:53 |
| 7. | "From the Day" | Palmer, Smith, Hein, Kulla | 3:40 |
| 8. | "Make a Way" | Palmer, Ingram, Smith, Hein, Kulla | 4:22 |
| 9. | "Here's My Heart" | Ingram, Chris Tomlin, Louie Giglio | 5:39 |
| 10. | "Amen" | Palmer, Hein, Kulla, Smith, Tony Wood | 3:58 |
| Total length: | | | 39:46 |

== Charts ==
| Chart (2015) | Peak position |
|---|---|
| US Top Christian Albums (Billboard) | 10 |
