= The Cross Has the Final Word =

2017 song by Cody Carnes

Single by Cody Carnes

from the album The Darker the Night / The Brighter the Morning
- Released: February 24, 2017
- Recorded: 2016
- Genre: Contemporary Christian music
- Length: 4:12 (studio version); 4:53 (live version)
- Label: Sparrow; Capitol CMG
- Songwriter: Cody Carnes
- Producer: Jeremy Lutito

Cody Carnes singles chronology
"Walls" (2012)	"The Cross Has the Final Word" (2017)	"Hold It All" (2017)

Music videos
- "The Cross Has the Final Word" (Live) on YouTube
- "The Cross Has the Final Word" (Lyrics) on YouTube

"The Cross Has the Final Word" is a song by American Christian musician Cody Carnes. The song was released on July 14, 2017, as the fourth single from his debut studio album, The Darker the Night / The Brighter the Morning (2017). The song was written by Cody Carnes. Jeremy Lutito produced the single.

The Cross Has the Final Word peaked at No. 45 on the US Hot Christian Songs chart.

== Background ==
On February 24, 2017, Cody Carnes released his first single with Capitol Christian Music Group called "The Cross Has the Final Word", with the announcement that his debut solo album would be released in 2017, having signed with the label. Carnes shared the story behind the song with NewReleaseToday.

== Composition ==
"The Cross Has the Final Word" is composed in the key of C with a tempo of 75 beats per minute and a musical time signature of 4/4.

== Critical reception ==
Jonathan Andre of 365 Days of Inspiring Media gave a positive review of the song.

== Commercial performance ==
"The Cross Has the Final Word" debuted at No. 45 on the US Hot Christian Songs chart dated May 6, 2017.

== Music videos ==
The audio video of "The Cross Has the Final Word" showcasing the single artwork was released by Cody Carnes on February 24, 2017, to YouTube. The live music video of the song, performed by Cody Carnes, was also published on the same day. The lyric video of the song was published on March 10, 2017, on Cody Carnes' YouTube channel.

== Track listing ==
"The Cross Has the Final Word"
No.	Title	Producer	Length
1.	"The Cross Has the Final Word"	Jeremy Lutito	4:12

"The Cross Has the Final Word" (Live)
No.	Title	Producer	Length
1.	"The Cross Has the Final Word" (Live)	Cody Carnes	4:53

== Charts ==
Weekly chart performance for "The Cross Has the Final Word"
Chart (2017)	Peak position
US Christian Songs (Billboard)	45

== Release history ==
Region	Date	Version	Format	Label	Ref.
Various	February 24, 2017	Studio	Digital download; streaming	Sparrow Records	
Various	May 26, 2017	Live	Digital download; streaming	Sparrow Records	

== Other versions ==
- The Belonging Co released their own rendition of the song featuring Henry Seeley on their debut live album, All the Earth (2017).
