= Hope of the Ages =

2021 single by Hillsong Worship, Reuben Morgan and Cody Carnes

Single by Hillsong Worship, Reuben Morgan and Cody Carnes

from the album These Same Skies
- Released: 20 August 2021
- Genre: Contemporary worship music
- Length: 5:10
- Label: Hillsong Music; Capitol CMG
- Songwriter(s): Reuben Morgan; Cody Carnes
- Producer(s): Jason Ingram; Brooke Ligertwood

Hillsong Worship singles chronology
"Fresh Wind" (2021)	"Hope of the Ages" (2021)

Cody Carnes singles chronology
"Too Good to Not Believe" (2021)	"Hope of the Ages" (2021)	"Firm Foundation (He Won't)" (2021)

Music video
- "Hope of the Ages" (Live) on YouTube

"Hope of the Ages" is a song performed by Hillsong Worship, Reuben Morgan and Cody Carnes. The song was released as the lead single to Hillsong Worship's album, These Same Skies, on 20 August 2021. The song was written by Cody Carnes and Reuben Morgan. Jason Ingram and Brooke Ligertwood handled the production of the single.

"Hope of the Ages" peaked at No. 49 on the US Hot Christian Songs chart.

== Background ==
"Hope of the Ages" is a collaborative single by Hillsong Worship, Reuben Morgan and Cody Carnes on 20 August 2021. Morgan shared the story behind the song in CCM Magazine.

== Composition ==
"Hope of the Ages" is composed in the key of B with a tempo of 99.5 beats per minute and a musical time signature of 6/8.

== Reception ==
=== Critical response ===
Jonathan Andre of 365 Days of Inspiring Media gave a positive review of "Hope of the Ages".

=== Accolades ===
Year-end lists
Publication	Accolade	Rank	Ref.
365 Days Of Inspiring Media	Top 50 Songs of 2021	33	

== Commercial performance ==
"Hope of the Ages" debuted at number 49 on the US Hot Christian Songs chart dated 4 September 2021.

== Music video ==
Hillsong Worship published the official music video of "Hope of the Ages" on YouTube on 19 August 2021.

== Personnel ==
Credits adapted from AllMusic.

- Cody Carnes — primary artist
- Garrett Davis — A&R
- Andrea García — A&R
- Bruno Gruel — mastering engineer
- Hillsong Worship — primary artist
- Jason Ingram — executive producer, producer
- Brooke Ligertwood — executive producer, producer
- Sean Moffitt — mixing
- Reuben Morgan — primary artist
- Johnny Rays — management

== Charts ==
Weekly chart performance for "Hope of the Ages"
Chart (2021)	Peak position
US Christian Songs (Billboard)	49

== Release history ==
Release dates and formats for "Hope of the Ages"
Region	Date	Format	Label	Ref.
Various	20 August 2021	Digital download; streaming	Hillsong Music; Capitol Christian Music Group	
