= Firm Foundation (He Won't) =

2021 song by Cody Carnes

Single by Cody Carnes
- Released: December 10, 2021
- Genre: Contemporary worship music; Christian adult contemporary
- Length: 6:22
- Label: Sparrow; Capitol CMG
- Songwriters: Austin Davis; Chandler Moore; Cody Carnes
- Producer: Austin Davis

Cody Carnes singles chronology
"Hope of the Ages" (2021)	"Firm Foundation (He Won't)" (2021)	"The Commission" (2022)

Music video
- "Firm Foundation (He Won't)" (Lyrics) on YouTube

"Firm Foundation (He Won't)" is a song by American Contemporary Christian musician and worship leader Cody Carnes. The song was released on December 10, 2021, as a single. Carnes co-wrote the song with Chandler Moore and Austin Davis. Austin Davis produced the single.

"Firm Foundation (He Won't)" peaked at No. 14 on the US Hot Christian Songs chart.

The song was covered by Maverick City Music, with Chandler Moore and Cody Carnes featuring on their track. The Maverick City Music rendition peaked at No. 33 on the US Hot Christian Songs chart, and No. 10 on the Hot Gospel Songs chart.

== Background ==
Cody Carnes released "Firm Foundation (He Won't)" on December 10, 2021. The song was his third and final single of 2021, following the releases of "Too Good to Not Believe" alongside Brandon Lake and "Hope of the Ages" with Hillsong Worship and Reuben Morgan. Carnes shared the inspiration behind the song, saying:

In such a shaky season, it was burning in my heart to write a song that declared what Jesus teaches us in Matthew 7. It says, Therefore everyone who hears these words of mine and puts them into practice is like a wise man who built his house on the rock. The rain came down, the streams rose, and the winds blew and beat against that house, yet it did not fall, because it had its foundation on the rock. The world can be in chaos all outside our windows, but when we build our house on Jesus, we can have confidence knowing that our foundation is secure. We're not going down! This new song celebrates that truth. I pray it blesses you.

== Composition ==
"Firm Foundation (He Won't)" is composed in the key of B♭ with a tempo of 75 beats per minute and a musical time signature of 6/8.

== Reception ==
=== Critical response ===
Joshua Andre of 365 Days of Inspiring Media gave a positive review of the song, saying: "The long and short of it is that "Firm Foundation (He Won't)", is a song that we all need to hear. Catchy in its delivery, and poppy in its musical style; it is the lyrics that really hit home for me." Jono Davies, reviewing for Louder Than The Music, said of the song: "As a song overall this does what it says on the tin, a strong worship song with a strong and powerful message that I hope you take heart from. Cody is a great worship leader and is a great blessing and with this song he has made another great song that will touch peoples lives."

=== Accolades ===
Awards and nominations
Year	Organization	Award	Result	Ref
2024	GMA Dove Awards	Song of the Year	Pending	
2024	GMA Dove Awards	Worship Recorded Song of the Year	Pending	

== Commercial performance ==
"Firm Foundation (He Won't)" made its debut at No. 50 on the US Christian Airplay chart dated April 23, 2022.

== Music video ==
The lyric video of "Firm Foundation (He Won't)" was published on December 10, 2021, on Cody Carnes' YouTube channel.

== Personnel ==
Credits adapted from AllMusic.

- Dan Alber — bass
- Jonathan Baines — choir/chorus
- Cody Carnes — primary artist, acoustic guitar
- Tamar Chipp — choir/chorus
- Chad Chrisman — A&R
- Austin Davis — background vocals, drums, electric guitar, engineer, keyboards, percussion, producer, vocal engineer
- Garrett Davis — A&R
- David Dennis — choir/chorus
- Olivia Grasso — background vocals, choir/chorus
- Jessica Hall — choir/chorus
- Matt Huber — mixing
- Kari Jobe — background vocals
- Nicole Johnson — choir/chorus
- Benji Kurokose — choir/chorus
- Shantrice Laura — background vocals, choir/chorus
- Brenton Miles — engineer, vocal engineer
- Scott Mills — electric guitar
- Noah Moreno — choir/chorus
- Sam Moses — mastering engineer
- Grant Pittman — keyboards, organ, piano
- Edwin Portillo — vocal engineer
- Bria Valderrama — choir/chorus

== Charts ==
=== Weekly charts ===
Weekly chart performance for "Firm Foundation (He Won't)"
Chart (2022–2024)	Peak position
US Christian Songs (Billboard)	5
US Christian Airplay (Billboard)	2
US Christian AC (Billboard)	1

=== Year-end charts ===
Year-end chart performance for "Firm Foundation (He Won't)"
Chart (2023)	Position
US Christian Songs (Billboard)	40
US Christian Airplay (Billboard)	46

== Certifications ==
Region	Certification	Certified units/sales
United States (RIAA)	Gold	500,000^{‡}
^{‡} Sales+streaming figures based on certification alone.

== Release history ==
Region	Date	Format	Label	Ref.
Various	December 10, 2021	Digital download; streaming	Sparrow Records; Capitol Christian Music Group	

== Maverick City Music version ==
"Firm Foundation (He Won't)"

Single by Maverick City Music featuring Chandler Moore and Cody Carnes

from the album The Maverick Way Complete
- Released: January 3, 2022
- Recorded: 2021
- Genre: Contemporary worship music
- Length: 8:44
- Label: Tribl

Maverick City Music singles chronology
"Joy To The World (Joyful, Joyful)" (2021)	"Firm Foundation (He Won't)" (2022)	"Jireh" (2022)

Chandler Moore singles chronology
"Anyone" (2021)	"Firm Foundation (He Won't)" (2022)	"Jireh" (2022)

Music video
- "Firm Foundation (He Won't)" on YouTube

On January 3, 2022, Maverick City Music released their version of "Firm Foundation (He Won't)" featuring Chandler Moore and Cody Carnes as the first single for the later released album The Maverick Way Complete.

=== Composition ===
"Firm Foundation (He Won't)" is composed in the key of D♭ with a tempo of 75 beats per minute and a musical time signature of 6/8.

=== Commercial performance ===
"Firm Foundation (He Won't)" debuted at No. 49 on the US Hot Christian Songs, and No. 20 on the Hot Gospel Songs charts dated January 15, 2022.

=== Music video ===
The official music video of "Firm Foundation (He Won't)" was released on January 3, 2022, via Tribl Records' YouTube channel. The music video was filmed in Chicago, during Maverick City's national tour on October 1, 2021.

=== Charts ===
==== Weekly charts ====
Weekly chart performance for "Firm Foundation (He Won't)"
Chart (2022)	Peak position
US Hot Christian Songs (Billboard)	33
US Gospel Songs (Billboard)	10

=== Year-end charts ===
Year-end chart performance for "Firm Foundation (He Won't)"
Chart (2022)	Position
US Christian Songs (Billboard)	88
US Gospel Songs (Billboard)	19

=== Release history ===
Region	Date	Format	Label	Ref.
Various	January 3, 2022	Digital download; streaming	Tribl Records	
