= Good (Can't Be Anything Else) =

2022 song by Cody Carnes

Single by Cody Carnes

from the album God Is Good!
- Released: August 19, 2022
- Recorded: July 2022
- Venue: The Belonging Co, Nashville, Tennessee, US
- Genre: Contemporary worship music
- Length: 9:52
- Label: Sparrow; Capitol CMG
- Songwriters: Cody Carnes; Aodhan King
- Producers: Aaron Robertson; Austin Davis; Hank Bentley; Jeff Pardo

Cody Carnes singles chronology
"Be Glad" (2022)	"Good (Can't Be Anything Else)" (2022)	"Ain't Nobody" (2022)

Music video
- "Good (Can't Be Anything Else)" on YouTube

"Good (Can't Be Anything Else)" is a song by American Contemporary Christian musician and worship leader Cody Carnes. The song was released on August 19, 2022, as the lead single from his first live album, God Is Good! (2022). Carnes co-wrote the song with Aodhan King. The single was produced by Aaron Robertson and Austin Davis.

"Good (Can't Be Anything Else)" peaked at No. 39 on the US Christian Airplay chart.

== Background ==
In June 2022, Cody Carnes announced that he will be recording his first live album on July 7–8 at The Belonging Co in Nashville, Tennessee, Carnes released "Good (Can't Be Anything Else)" accompanied with its live music video on August 19, 2022, as the lead single from the album. On September 2, 2022, Carnes announced that he will be releasing his first live album, God Is Good!, on September 30, 2022.

== Composition ==
"Good (Can't Be Anything Else)" is composed in the key of E♭ with a tempo of 64.5 beats per minute and a musical time signature of 4/4.

== Critical reception ==
Reviewing for Worship Leader, Christopher Watson said "Good (Can't Be Anything Else)" was one of the standout tracks from the album.

== Commercial performance ==
"Good (Can't Be Anything Else)" made its debut at No. 45 on the US Christian Airplay chart dated November 12, 2022.

== Music video ==
The official live performance video of "Good (Can't Be Anything Else)" was published on August 19, 2022, on Cody Carnes' YouTube channel. The video shows Carnes leading the song in worship, filmed at The Belonging Co in Nashville, Tennessee.

== Personnel ==
Credits adapted from AllMusic.

- Lorenzo Baylor — choir/chorus
- Alex Bivens — choir/chorus
- Cody Carnes — acoustic guitar, primary artist, vocals
- Jess Carpenter — choir/chorus
- Angelique Carter — choir/chorus
- Chad Chrisman — A&R
- Amanda Cockrell — choir/chorus
- Austin Davis — drums, producer
- Garrett Davis — A&R
- Tito Ebiwonjumi — choir/chorus
- Jenna Lee Fair — choir/chorus
- Carissa Fernald — choir/chorus
- Evan Fernald — piano
- Gavin Garris — choir/chorus
- Sam Gibson — mastering engineer, mixing
- Jayci Gorza — choir/chorus
- Olivia Grasso — choir/chorus
- Brad Guldemond — choir/chorus
- Baily Hager — choir/chorus
- Chelsea Howard — choir/chorus
- Joel Okaah — choir/chorus
- Nicole Johnson — choir/chorus
- Benji Kuriakose — choir/chorus
- Shantrice Laura — background vocals
- Christian Mason — choir/chorus
- Brenton Miles — background vocals, electric guitar, engineer
- Casey Moore — electric guitar
- Noah Moreno — choir/chorus
- Kittie Carreker Morgan — choir/chorus
- Tayler Moses — choir/chorus
- Angela Nasby — choir/chorus
- Christina Onstott — choir/chorus
- Brady Pendergrass — choir/chorus
- Kelsei Peppars — choir/chorus
- Cory Pierce — electric guitar
- Jordyn Pierce — choir/chorus
- Edwin Portillo — choir/chorus
- Kyle Pruzina — choir/chorus
- Marci Pruzina — choir/chorus
- Aaron Robertson — keyboards, producer, programming, synthesizer
- Alyssa Rodriguez — choir/chorus
- Emily Ruff — choir/chorus
- Matt Sanders — choir/chorus
- Gilbert Sauceda — choir/chorus
- Rylee Scott — choir/chorus
- Setnick T. Sene — choir/chorus
- Sharon Okaah — choir/chorus
- Lydia Shaw — choir/chorus
- Sophie Shear — choir/chorus
- Kendall Smith — choir/chorus
- Zack Smith — choir/chorus
- Kelley Sparks — choir/chorus
- Blake Stafford — choir/chorus
- Cheryl Stark — choir/chorus
- Kirsten Strahley — choir/chorus
- Jordan Stribling — choir/chorus
- Keithon Stribling — background vocals
- Cody Sullivan — choir/chorus
- Robby Valderrama — choir/chorus
- Mitch Wong — background vocals
- Steph Wong — choir/chorus
- Shae Wooten — bass, synthesizer bass
- Ashley Wright — choir/chorus
- Daniella Young — background vocals

== Charts ==
Chart performance for "Good (Can't Be Anything Else)"
Chart (2022)	Peak position
US Christian Airplay (Billboard)	39

== Release history ==
Release history and formats for "Good (Can't Be Anything Else)"
Region	Date	Format	Label	Ref.
Various	August 19, 2022	Digital download; streaming	Sparrow Records; Capitol Christian Music Group	
