= God Is Good! =

2022 live album by Cody Carnes

Live album by Cody Carnes
- Released: September 30, 2022
- Recorded: July 7–8, 2022
- Venue: The Belonging Co, Nashville, Tennessee, US
- Genre: Contemporary worship music
- Length: 76:15
- Label: Sparrow; Capitol CMG
- Producer: Hank Bentley; Austin Davis; Jeff Pardo; Aaron Robertson

Cody Carnes chronology
Run to the Father (2020)	God Is Good! (2022)

Singles from God Is Good!
- 1. "Too Good to Not Believe" Released: May 28, 2021; 2. "Good (Can't Be Anything Else)" Released: August 19, 2022; 3. "Ain't Nobody" Released: September 30, 2022; 4. "Take You At Your Word" Released: May 10, 2024

God Is Good! is the first live album by American contemporary Christian musician Cody Carnes. It was released on September 30, 2022, via Sparrow Records and Capitol Christian Music Group. The album features guest appearances by Kari Jobe, Natalie Grant, and Benjamin William Hastings. The album was produced by Austin Davis, Aaron Robertson

God Is Good! was supported by the release of "Good (Can't Be Anything Else)" and "Ain't Nobody" as singles. "Good (Can't Be Anything Else)" peaked at No. 39 on the US Christian Airplay chart. "Ain't Nobody" peaked at No. 5 on the US Hot Christian Songs chart. "Forever & Amen" was released as a promotional single from the album. The album is also being promoted with the God Is Good! Tour, spanning eight cities across the United States in 2023.

The album debuted at No. 45 on Billboard's Top Christian Albums chart in the United States. At the 2023 GMA Dove Awards, God Is Good! was nominated for Worship Album of the Year and Long Form Video of the Year awards.

== Background ==
In June 2022, Cody Carnes announced that he will be recording his first live album on July 7–8 at The Belonging Co in Nashville, Tennessee. On September 2, 2022, Carnes announced that he will be releasing his first live album, God Is Good!, on September 30, 2022.

== Release and promotion ==
=== Singles ===
Carnes released "Good (Can't Be Anything Else)" accompanied with its live music video on August 19, 2022, as the lead single from the album. "Good (Can't Be Anything Else)" peaked at No. 42 on the US Christian Airplay chart.

On September 30, 2022, "Ain't Nobody" impacted Christian radio in the United States as the second single from the album. "Ain't Nobody" peaked at No. 5 on the US Hot Christian Songs chart.

=== Promotional singles ===
Cody Carnes released "Ain't Nobody" as the first promotional single from the album on September 2, 2022, accompanied with its music video.

Carnes released "Forever & Amen" with Kari Jobe as the second promotional single from the album, accompanied with its music video.

== Critical reception ==
Professional ratings
Review scores
Source	Rating
JubileeCast	2.75/5

Timothy Yap, reviewing for JubileeCast, concluded in his review of the album: "In terms of recording techniques, budget, co-writers, and duet partners, Carnes has everything going for him. He just needs to work on his songs --- they need more hooks." Reviewing for Worship Leader, Christopher Watson said "All the tracts are solid. But some are truly special, bold, and full of energy that fuels the soul," concluding with the recommendation that "It would be great to see what Cody would do with more creative instrumentation, beyond the standard worship team rhythm section and vocal cast."

=== Awards and nominations ===
Awards
Year	Organization	Award	Result	Ref
2023	GMA Dove Awards	Worship Album of the Year	Nominated	
2023	GMA Dove Awards	Long Form Video of the Year	Nominated	

== Touring ==
On October 10, 2022, Cody Carnes announced his first headlining tour, dubbed the God Is Good! Tour, joined by Benjamin William Hastings as a special guest and set to visit eight cities across the United States in 2023. The tour will commence at Desperation Church, Cullman, Alabama on February 8, 2023, concluding at The King's University in Dallas, Texas, on February 19, 2023.

== Commercial performance ==
In the United States, God Is Good! debuted at No. 45 on the Top Christian Albums chart in the United States dated October 15, 2022.

== Track listing ==
All tracks were produced by Aaron Robertson and Austin Davis except where stated.

God Is Good track listing
No.	Title	Writer(s)	Producer(s)	Length
1.	"Good (Can't Be Anything Else)"	Aodhan King; Cody Carnes		9:52
2.	"Take You at Your Word" (with Benjamin William Hastings)	King; Benjamin William Hastings; Carnes		5:16
3.	"Ain't Nobody"	Brandon Lake; Carnes; Hank Bentley		4:07
4.	"Simple Kingdom"	Bryan Torwalt; Carnes; Katie Torwalt; Paul Duncan		6:45
5.	"Good to Be Loved" (with Natalie Grant)	Carnes; Mia Fieldes; Mitch Wong		6:58
6.	"Too Good to Not Believe"	Lake; Chris Davenport; Carnes; Joshua Silverberg		5:49
7.	"Our God Reigns (Psalm 47)"	Martin Smith		5:46
8.	"Forever & Amen" (with Kari Jobe)	Carnes; Jason Ingram; Reuben Morgan		9:50
9.	"I'll Follow"	Carnes; Ingram; Morgan		7:42
10.	"How Precious Is the Blood"	Carnes; Jessie Early; Kari Jobe Carnes; Maryanne J. George		8:15
11.	"The Blood Will Never Lose Its Power"	Andrae Crouch		2:20
12.	"Ain't Nobody" (Radio Version)	Lake; Carnes; Bentley	Aaron Robertson; Austin Davis; Hank Bentley; Jeff Pardo	3:34
Total length:				76:15

== Personnel ==
Credits adapted from AllMusic.

- Andria Alston — vocals
- Jacob Arnold — drums, percussion
- Jonathan Baines — choir/chorus
- Lorenzo Baylor — choir/chorus
- Tammy Beiswenger — vocals
- Hank Bentley — acoustic guitar, background vocals, electric guitar, Hammond organ, piano, producer, programming
- Chris Bevins — editing
- Alex Bivens — choir/chorus
- Cody Carnes — acoustic guitar, background vocals, percussion, piano, primary artist, vocals
- Jess Carpenter — choir/chorus
- Angelique Carter — choir/chorus
- Mike Cervantes — mastering engineer
- Chad Chrisman — A&R
- Amanda Cockrell — choir/chorus
- Marci Coleman — choir/chorus
- Austin Davis — Drums, Producer
- Garrett Davis — A&R
- Donte Dowlling — Engineer
- Jackson Dreyer — choir/chorus
- Tito Ebiwonjumi — choir/chorus
- Eddie Edwards — electric guitar
- Enaka Enyong — choir/chorus
- Jenna Lee Fair — choir/chorus
- Devin Feldman — engineer
- Carissa Fernald — choir/chorus
- Evan Fernald — piano
- Gavin Garris — choir/chorus
- Sam Gibson — mastering engineer, mixing
- Jayci Gorza — choir/chorus
- Natalie Grant — primary artist, vocals
- Olivia Grasso — choir/chorus
- Brad Guldemond — choir/chorus
- Baily Hager — choir/chorus
- Benjamin Hastings — primary artist, vocals
- Bernie Herms — Hammond B3
- Chelsea Howard — choir/chorus
- Briana Jean — vocals
- Kari Jobe — background vocals, primary artist, vocals
- Joel Okaah — choir/chorus
- Nicole Johnson — choir/chorus
- Ashley Jolley — choir/chorus
- Andrew Joseph — vocals
- Graham King — engineer
- Benji Kuriakose — choir/chorus
- Shantrice Laura — background vocals
- Tony Lucido — bass
- Christian Mason — choir/chorus
- Brenton Miles — background vocals, electric guitar, engineer
- Casey Moore — electric guitar
- Noah Moreno — choir/chorus
- Kittie Carreker Morgan — choir/chorus
- Tayler Moses — choir/chorus
- Angela Nasby — choir/chorus
- Amber Nealy — vocals
- Jack Nellis — engineer
- Christina Onstott — choir/chorus
- Jeff Pardo — keyboards, producer, programming
- Brady Pendergrass — choir/chorus
- Kelsei Peppars — choir/chorus
- Cory Pierce — electric guitar
- Jordyn Pierce — choir/chorus
- Edwin Portillo — choir/chorus
- Kyle Pruzina — choir/chorus
- Marci Pruzina — choir/chorus
- Dayanna Redic — vocals
- Aaron Robertson — keyboards, producer, programming, synthesizer
- Alyssa Rodriguez — choir/chorus
- Emily Ruff — choir/chorus
- Matt Sanders — choir/chorus
- Gilbert Sauceda — choir/chorus
- Rylee Scott — choir/chorus
- Setnick T. Sene — choir/chorus
- Sharon Okaah — choir/chorus
- Lydia Shaw — choir/chorus
- Sophie Shear — choir/chorus
- Kendall Smith — choir/chorus
- Zack Smith — choir/chorus
- Kelley Sparks — choir/chorus
- Blake Stafford — choir/chorus
- Cheryl Stark — choir/chorus
- Kirsten Strahley — choir/chorus
- Jordan Stribling — choir/chorus
- Keithon Stribling — background vocals
- Cody Sullivan — choir/chorus
- Bria Valderrama — choir/chorus
- Robby Valderrama — choir/chorus
- Doug Weier — mixing
- Mitch Wong — background vocals
- Steph Wong — choir/chorus
- Caleb Wood — vocals
- Shae Wooten — bass, synthesizer bass
- Ashley Wright — choir/chorus
- Daniella Young — background vocals, choir/chorus

== Charts ==
=== Weekly charts ===
Weekly chart performance for God Is Good!
Chart (2022)	Peak position
US Christian Albums (Billboard)	45

=== Year-end charts ===
Year-end chart performance for God Is Good!
Chart (2023)	Position
US Christian Albums (Billboard)	60

== Release history ==
Release history and formats for God Is Good!
Region	Date	Format	Label	Ref.
Various	September 30, 2022	Digital download; streaming	Sparrow Records; Capitol Christian Music Group	
