= Til the End of Time =

2017 song by Cody Carnes

Single by Cody Carnes featuring Kari Jobe

from the album The Darker the Night / The Brighter the Morning
- Released: June 16, 2017
- Recorded: 2017
- Genre: Contemporary worship music; CCM
- Length: 3:26
- Label: Sparrow; Capitol CMG
- Songwriters: Cody Carnes; Lauren Strahm; Robert Marvin
- Producer: Jeremy Lutito

Cody Carnes singles chronology
"Hold It All" (2017)	"Til the End of Time" (2017)	"What Freedom Feels Like" (2017)

Kari Jobe singles chronology
"Let Your Glory Fall" (2017)	"Til the End of Time" (2017)	"Cover the Earth" (2018)

Music videos
- "Til the End of Time" on YouTube
- "Til the End of Time" (Acoustic) on YouTube
- "Til the End of Time" (Live) on YouTube
- "Til the End of Time" (Lyrics) on YouTube

"Til the End of Time" is a song by American Christian musician Cody Carnes featuring Kari Jobe. The song was released on June 16, 2017, as the third single from his debut studio album, The Darker the Night / The Brighter the Morning (2017). Carnes co-wrote the song with Lauren Strahm and Robert Marvin. Jeremy Lutito produced the single.

"Til the End of Time" peaked at No. 50 on the US Hot Christian Songs chart.

== Background ==
Cody Carnes released "Til the End of the Time" featuring Kari Jobe as the third single from his debut studio album, The Darker the Night / The Brighter the Morning (2017). The song followed the release of singles "The Cross Has the Final Word" and "Hold It All."

== Composition ==
"Til the End of Time" is composed in the key of B minor with a tempo of 80 beats per minute and a musical time signature of 4/4.

== Critical reception ==
Jonathan Andre of 365 Days of Inspiring Media in gave a positive review of the song, comparing the song to "History Maker" by Delirious?, and describing the song as Carnes "Fusing together worship with electronic dance music (as with a lot of his music)... everything is on point—the vocals, singing, the collaboration together as well as the music."

== Commercial performance ==
"Til the End of Time" debuted at No. 50 on the US Hot Christian Songs chart dated July 8, 2017.

== Music videos ==
The lyric video of "Til the End of Time" was published on June 16, 2017, on Cody Carnes' YouTube channel. Cody Carnes released the official music video of "Til the End of Time" on June 30, 2017, on YouTube. Cody Carnes released the acoustic performance video of "Til the End of Time" on June 30, 2017, on YouTube. The live performance video of the song, performed by Cody Carnes and Kari Jobe, was published on October 27, 2017, on Cody Carnes' YouTube channel.

== Charts ==
Weekly chart performance for "Til the End of Time"
Chart (2017)	Peak position
US Christian Songs (Billboard)	50

== Release history ==
Region	Date	Format	Label	Ref.
Various	June 16, 2017	Digital download; streaming	Sparrow Records	
