= The Darker the Night / The Brighter the Morning =

Studio album by Cody Carnes
- Released: September 15, 2017
- Recorded: 2017
- Genre: Worship; CCM; Christian alternative rock
- Length: 53:03
- Label: Sparrow; Capitol CMG
- Producer: Jeremy Lutito; Joe Causey; Cody Carnes

Cody Carnes chronology
The Darker the Night / The Brighter the Morning (2017)	Run to the Father (2020)

Singles from The Darker the Night / The Brighter the Morning
- 1. "The Cross Has the Final Word" Released: February 24, 2017; 2. "Hold It All" Released: April 7, 2017; 3. "Til the End of Time" Released: June 16, 2017; 4. "What Freedom Feels Like" Released: July 14, 2017

The Darker the Night / The Brighter the Morning is the debut studio album by American Christian musician Cody Carnes. The album was released on September 15, 2017, by Sparrow Records alongside Capitol Christian Music Group and Carnes Music Group. Carnes worked with Jeremy Lutito on the production of the album.

== Background ==
On February 24, 2017, Cody Carnes released his first single with Capitol Christian Music Group called "The Cross Has the Final Word", with the announcement that his debut solo album will be released in 2017, having signed with the label. The releases of "Hold It All", "Til the End of Time" (featuring Kari Jobe), and "What Freedom Feels Like", as singles followed in April, June and July 2017 respectively.

In a press release published on August 14, 2017, Cody Carnes and Capitol CMG announced the release of The Darker the Night / The Brighter the Morning, to be slated for September 15, 2017, and that the digital preorder for the album was available.

In an exclusive interview with Herb Longs of The Christian Beat published before the album's release, Carnes described the sound of the album and his sentiments about it in response to Longs' enquiry, saying:

I knew I wanted to make worship music that leads people into the presence of God and blends a few different genres that I love: pop, indie electronic and rock. I feel like the end product accomplishes that in the way I wanted it to and I'm really proud to share it with people. I feel like it's a true introduction to who I am as an artist.

— Cody Carnes, The Christian Beat

Carnes also shared that he intended to write Scripture-inspired songs about God's love and the power of Jesus, as is considered the norm in most worship records, whilst drawing inspiration from artists like Bon Iver, Coldplay and OneRepublic, saying that "I feel like there are a lot of people in the world like me that love the creative experience of seeing some of their favorite bands live and also love the spiritual experience of a worship night. I want to merge those two worlds together."

== Release and promotion ==
=== Singles ===
The studio and live versions of "The Cross Has the Final Word", were released on February 24, 2017, as the lead singles from the album. On April 7, 2017, "Hold It All" became the second song to be released by Carnes as a single from the album. This was followed by "Til the End of Time", a song featuring his wife and fellow label-mate Kari Jobe, was released as a single in June 2017. Cody Carnes released "What Freedom Feels Like" as a single on July 14, 2017, being the last official single to be released from the album.

=== Promotional singles ===
At the commencement of the digital pre-order period on August 14, 2017, the songs "Hold It All", "Til the End of Time", "The Cross Has the Final Word" and "What Freedom Feels Like" were made available for instant download, upon ordering the album. "Full of Faith", which was released on August 25, 2017, as a preorder single from the album. "Resurrection Blood" was the last song to be availed for instant download during the pre-order period on September 8, 2017.

=== Contest ===
Following the release of "What Freedom Feels Like" as an official single in July 2017, MultiTracks partnered with Cody Carnes and Capitol Christian Music Group for a special contest based on the song from early August to September 1, 2017. Contestants had to record their own cover of "What Freedom Feels Like" and upload it on Instagram using the tag #whatfreedomfeelslikecover in order to win MultiTracks-related prizes including MultiTracks resources for The Darker the Night / The Brighter the Morning and a Skype meeting with Cody Carnes.

== Commercial performance ==
In the week ending October 7, 2017, The Darker the Night / The Brighter the Morning, was the seventeenth best-selling Christian album in the United States as ranked by Billboard. The album also registered on Billboard's Heatseekers Albums chart at number 17.

== Critical reception ==
Professional ratings
Review scores
Source	Rating
365 Days Of Inspiring Media	4/5 stars
CCM Magazine	4.5/5 stars
The Christian Beat	4.8/5 stars
Cross Rhythms	8/10 squares
Louder Than The Music	5/5 stars
Today's Christian Entertainment	3.9/5 stars

Bestowing the album a four-star rating in a review at 365 Days Of Inspiring Media, Jonathan Andre states that "Cody is starting to become an artist himself, with this new album being a collection of some of the most musically unique and out-of-the-box songs I’ve heard in a while, Cody’s career is certain to be as long as it will be impacting and inspiring for those who hear his music." CCM Magazine music critic Matt Conner awarded The Darker the Night / The Brighter the Morning a four and a half star rating in his review, concluding that "Carnes has crafted an imaginative worship album that adds, distorts and filters convention for a satisfying listen that remains deep and substantive." Chris Major of The Christian Beat says in his four-point-eight star review that "Engaging melodies and adorative lyrics saturate the collection, bringing listeners to a place of worship and awe in a way not often seen throughout the genre. The Darker the Night / The Brighter the Morning is an incredibly strong debut and a fantastic introduction to a talented artist, clearly passionate about His Savior." Lins Honeyman, in a review at Cross Rhythms, rated the album eight squares out of ten, saying "For the most part, Carnes keeps things varied and the musical backdrop to each track plays towards his strengths as a powerful and distinctive vocalist." Giving the album a perfect five stars in a superbly positive Louder Than The Music review, Jono Davies praised the album, describing it as an album that "isn't afraid to be creative and experimental with its sounds, style and production." Davies concluded that "This album is uplifting, creative, exciting and powerful - but overall is a beautiful piece of expressional art in music. Cody has for me created a true masterpiece." Laura Chambers of Today's Christian Entertainment says in her three-point-nine star review that "If it’s true that tragedy brings truth into sharper focus, then let trouble come, because the glory which is still to come far exceeds our momentary trials. Cody Carnes’s debut is an encouraging glimpse of that future splendor, with moments of introspection mingling with shouts of declaration and prayers for a deeper fellowship with God. The Darker The Night / The Brighter The Morning reminds us all of the flip side of adversity, promising a greater awareness of God and a new perspective on life if we cling to His word." In a favourable review by Gerod Bass of Worship Musician Magazine, he says that "The Darker The Night / The Brighter The Morning is a creative expression of true worship. The songs are well mixed, with interesting and well-thought out arrangements that fit the lyrics perfectly in most cases. ... The melodies, adoration-focused lyrics, and overall feel were engaging throughout and will bring listeners, whether privately or corporately, into a place of awe and worship."

== Track listing ==
The Darker the Night / The Brighter the Morning
No.	Title	Writer(s)	Length
1.	"Resurrection Blood"	Cody Carnes; Bryan Fowler; Lauren Strahm	4:03
2.	"What Freedom Feels Like"	Strahm; C. Carnes; Robert Marvin	3:06
3.	"Til the End of Time" (featuring Kari Jobe)	Strahm; C. Carnes; Marvin	3:27
4.	"The Cross Has the Final Word"	C. Carnes	4:14
5.	"Full of Faith"	C. Carnes; Jason Ingram	3:39
6.	"Hold It All"	C. Carnes; Fowler	4:10
7.	"Rooms" (featuring Kari Jobe)	C. Carnes; Kari Jobe Carnes; Maggie Eckford	3:14
8.	"Through & Through"	C. Carnes; Joshua Silverberg; Lindsey Sweat	3:33
9.	"Wait Here"	C. Carnes	4:46
10.	"Banner"	C. Carnes; Jacob Cook; Josh Johnson; Ryne Norman	5:15
11.	"Bread & Wine"	C. Carnes; Silverberg	3:39
12.	"Nothing More To Say"	C. Carnes; Matt Maher	5:03
13.	"The Cross Has the Final Word (Live)"	C. Carnes	4:54
Total length:			53:03

== Charts ==
Chart (2017)	Peak position
US Christian Albums (Billboard)	17
US Heatseekers Albums (Billboard)	17

== Release history ==
Region	Date	Format	Label	Ref.
Worldwide	September 15, 2017	CD; digital download; streaming	Sparrow Records; Capitol Christian Music Group	
