= The Blessing (Kari Jobe album) =

2020 live album by Kari Jobe

Live album by Kari Jobe
- Released: October 23, 2020
- Venues: The Belonging Co, Nashville, Tennessee, U.S.
- Genre: Contemporary worship music
- Length: 121:09
- Labels: Sparrow; Capitol CMG
- Producers: Cody Carnes; Austin Davis; Henry Seeley; Jacob Sooter; McKendree Tucker

Kari Jobe chronology
| The Garden (2017) | The Blessing (2020) |

Singles from The Blessing
- 1. "The Blessing" Released: March 20, 2020

The Blessing is the third live album by Kari Jobe. The album was released on October 23, 2020, via Sparrow Records. The album features guest appearances by Cody Carnes. The album was produced by Cody Carnes, Austin Davis, Henry Seeley, Jacob Sooter, and McKendree Tucker.

The album was supported by the release of its title track as the lead single. The song peaked at No. 2 on the Hot Christian Songs, and has been certified gold by Recording Industry Association of America (RIAA). The album was also supported by the release of six promotional singles. To further promote the album, Jobe embarked on The Blessing USA Tour.

The album garnered mixed reviews from critics. It achieved commercial success, debuting at No. 3 on Billboard's Top Christian Albums Chart in the United States, and No. 7 on the OCC's Official Christian & Gospel Albums Chart in the United Kingdom. The Blessing was nominated for the GMA Dove Award Worship Album of the Year and Recorded Music Packaging of the Year at the 2021 GMA Dove Awards. The album was also nominated for the Grammy Award for Best Contemporary Christian Music Album at the 2022 Grammy Awards.

== Background ==
On September 18, 2020, Kari Jobe announced her first new album in over three years, The Blessing, serving as a follow-up to The Garden (2017). The album was recorded live at her church, The Belonging Co, in Nashville, without an audience during the COVID-19 pandemic, and was slated for release on October 23, 2020. The album featured songwriting contributions from notable songwriters such as Cody Carnes, Jonas Myrin, Steffany Gretzinger, Elevation Worship's Chris Brown and Steven Furtick, and Passion's Kristian Stanfill among others.

== Release and promotion ==
=== Singles ===
On March 20, 2020, Kari Jobe alongside Cody Carnes and Elevation Worship released "The Blessing" as a single. The song debuted at No. 3 and No. 4 on the Hot Christian Songs and the Digital Song Sales charts dated April 24, 2020, respectively. The song peaked at No. 2 on the Hot Christian Songs chart, and No. 15 on the Bubbling Under Hot 100 chart. "The Blessing" was certified gold by Recording Industry Association of America (RIAA).

=== Promotional singles ===
On September 18, 2020, Kari Jobe launched the album pre-order with the release of three promotional singles: "First Love", "Embers", and "Obsession" which featured Cody Carnes. "First Love" peaked at No. 31 on the Hot Christian Songs chart.

On October 2, 2020, Jobe released "Let the Light In" as the fourth promotional single from the album. "Let the Light In" peaked at No. 34 on the Hot Christian Songs chart.

On October 8, 2020, Jobe released "Your Nature" as the fifth promotional single from the album. "Let the Light In" peaked at No. 34 on the Hot Christian Songs chart.

On October 14, 2020, Jobe released "Heaven Invade" as the sixth and final promotional single from the album.

=== Touring ===
On February 12, 2021, Kari Jobe announced The Blessing USA Tour in conjunction with Premier Productions. Cody Carnes was also a featured performer of the tour. The tour spanned twenty-two cities across the United States, beginning on April 15, 2021, in Pittsburgh, Pennsylvania, and concluded on May 23, 2021, in Wichita, Kansas.

== Reception ==
=== Critical response ===
Professional ratings
Review scores
| Source | Rating |
|---|---|
| CCM Magazine | 2/5 stars |
| The Christian Beat | 5/5 |
| JubileeCast | 3.5/5 |

The Blessing has garnered mixed reviews from critics of CCM and contemporary worship music genres.

Jessie Clarks of The Christian Beat wrote a favourable review of the album, concluding that the songs "encompass a deep and personal trust and love in God," while the lyrics and music were "a combination that will bring worship to any listening situation." In a positive review for Worship Leader, Randy Cross said of the album: "provides a momentous amount of music that is directly focused on the main thing," while noting that the listening experience is best done "in meaningful portions, instead of all at one sitting." Reviewing for NewReleaseToday, Jasmin Patterson concluded on the album: "It's quickly become one of my favorite worship releases this year. I think it will be one of yours, too."

CCM Magazine's Dan MacIntosh gave a negative review of the album, opining that while the spontaneous moments are the best features of Jobe's concerts, it "doesn't always translate as successfully into an audio recording." Reviewing for JubileeCast, Timothy Yap also wrote a unfavourable review of the album, noting that while fans who like "Jobe's crescendo-style of worship" will enjoy the record, it had several flaws such as vague and superficial lyrical content, as well as sameness of sound.

=== Accolades ===
Awards
| Year | Organization | Award | Result | Ref |
|---|---|---|---|---|
| 2021 | GMA Dove Awards | Worship Album of the Year | Nominated | |
| 2021 | GMA Dove Awards | Recorded Music Packaging of the Year | Nominated | |
| 2022 | Grammy Awards | Best Contemporary Christian Music Album | Nominated | |

== Commercial performance ==
In the United States, The Blessing debuted at number three on the Billboard Top Christian Albums chart dated November 7, 2020. The Blessing also debuted on the OCC's Official Christian & Gospel Albums Chart at No. 7.

== Track listing ==
The Blessing
| No. | Title | Writer(s) | Producer(s) | Length |
|---|---|---|---|---|
| 1. | "Heaven Invade" | Austin Davis; Kari Jobe; Daniella Mason | Austin Davis; Cody Carnes; Henry Seeley | 4:19 |
| 2. | "Let the Light In" | Cody Carnes; Kristian Stanfill; Brett Younker | Austin Davis; Cody Carnes; Henry Seeley | 7:29 |
| 3. | "First Love" | Davis; Steffany Gretzinger; Jobe; Elyssa Smith | Austin Davis; Cody Carnes; Henry Seeley | 9:16 |
| 4. | "Embers (Spontaneous)" | Jobe | Austin Davis; Cody Carnes; Henry Seeley | 8:06 |
| 5. | "Obsession (Spontaneous)" (with Cody Carnes) | Martin Smith | Austin Davis; Cody Carnes; Henry Seeley | 5:06 |
| 6. | "The Blessing" (with Cody Carnes) | Chris Brown; Carnes; Steven Furtick; Jobe | Austin Davis; Cody Carnes; Henry Seeley | 8:12 |
| 7. | "Rest" | Davis; Jobe; David Moore; Lindsey Sweat | Austin Davis; Cody Carnes; Henry Seeley | 11:15 |
| 8. | "Favorite Place" | Ben Cantelon; Carnes; Jobe; Joshua Silverberg; Mitch Wong | Austin Davis; Cody Carnes; Henry Seeley | 7:53 |
| 9. | "Love So Holy" | Justin Amundrud; Jobe; Moore; Wong | Austin Davis; Cody Carnes; Henry Seeley | 7:48 |
| 10. | "Your Nature" | Hank Bentley; Jobe; Jacob Sooter; Charles Starling | Cody Carnes; Henry Seeley; Jacob Sooter | 9:59 |
| 11. | "The Wind" | Jobe; Allison Marin; Antonio Marin Martinez; McKendree Tucker | Cody Carnes; Henry Seeley; McKendree Tucker | 3:15 |
| 12. | "No Fear" | Amundrud; Jobe; Jonas Myrin; Sweat | Austin Davis; Cody Carnes; Henry Seeley | 9:13 |
| 13. | "Amen (Simple Gospel)" | Carnes; Jobe; Joshua Silverberg; Wong | Austin Davis; Cody Carnes; Henry Seeley | 7:24 |
| 14. | "Throne Room" | Davis; Jobe; Smith | Austin Davis; Cody Carnes; Henry Seeley | 6:56 |
| 15. | "Anthem of Praise" | Jobe | Austin Davis; Cody Carnes; Henry Seeley | 14:52 |
| Total length: | | | | 121:09 |

The Blessing — Apple Music bonus video content
| No. | Title | Length |
|---|---|---|
| 16. | "Heaven Invade" (Live at The Belonging Co, Nashville, TN/2020) | 4:17 |
| 17. | "Let the Light In" (Live at The Belonging Co, Nashville, TN/2020) | 7:40 |
| 18. | "First Love" (Live at The Belonging Co, Nashville, TN/2020) | 9:11 |
| 19. | "Embers (Spontaneous)" (Live at The Belonging Co, Nashville, TN/2020) | 8:06 |
| 20. | "Obsession" (Live at The Belonging Co, Nashville, TN/2020) | 5:05 |
| 21. | "Your Nature" (Live at The Belonging Co, Nashville, TN/2020) | 11:49 |

== Personnel ==
Credits adapted from Tidal, and AllMusic.

- Cody Carnes — primary artist, producer
- Austin Davis — producer
- Sam Gibson — mastering engineer, mixing
- Ted Jensen — mastering engineer
- Kari Jobe — primary artist
- Henry Seeley — producer
- Justin Shurtz — mastering engineer
- Jacob Sooter — producer
- McKendree Tucker — producer

== Charts ==
=== Weekly charts ===
Weekly chart performance for The Blessing
| Chart (2020) | Peak position |
|---|---|
| UK Christian & Gospel Albums (OCC) | 7 |
| US Top Christian Albums (Billboard) | 3 |
| US Top Album Sales (Billboard) | 78 |

=== Year-end charts ===
Year-end chart performance for The Blessing
| Chart (2020) | Position |
|---|---|
| US Christian Albums (Billboard) | 94 |
| Chart (2021) | Position |
| US Christian Albums (Billboard) | 100 |

== Release history ==
| Region | Date | Format | Label | Ref. |
|---|---|---|---|---|
| Various | October 23, 2020 | CD; digital download; streaming | Sparrow Records; Capitol Christian Music Group | |
