= Cover the Earth =

2018 song by Kari Jobe and Cody Carnes

Single by Kari Jobe and Cody Carnes
- Released: September 14, 2018
- Recorded: 2018
- Genre: Contemporary worship music; CCM
- Length: 4:04
- Label: Sparrow; Capitol CMG
- Songwriter(s): Cody Carnes; Daniella Young
- Producer(s): Jacob Sooter

Kari Jobe singles chronology
"Til the End of Time" (2017)	"Cover the Earth" (2018)	"The Blessing" (2020)

Cody Carnes singles chronology
"What Freedom Feels Like" (2017)	"Cover the Earth" (2018)	"Nothing Else" (2019)

Music videos
- "Cover the Earth" (Acoustic) on YouTube
- "Cover the Earth" (Live) on YouTube
- "Cover the Earth" (Lyrics) on YouTube

"Cover the Earth" is a song by American Christian musicians Kari Jobe and Cody Carnes. The song was released on September 14, 2018, as a single. The song was written by Cody Carnes and Daniella Young. Jacob Sooter produced the single.

"Cover the Earth" peaked at No. 29 on the US Hot Christian Songs chart.

== Background ==
Kari Jobe and Cody Carnes released "Cover the Earth" as a single on September 14, 2018. The song was originally written and released by Daniella Mason, with Cody Carnes adding a bridge to the song for their recording. Carnes shared the story behind the song, saying,

It's originally a pop song written and performed by our friend who is a part of our church, The Belonging Co. Daniella [Mason] has been performing this song in pop clubs for a few years and she has amazing stories about people unexpectedly encountering the presence of God through it in those venues. Now that we have a version for the church...

== Composition ==
"Cover the Earth" is composed in the key of E with a tempo of 71 beats per minute and a musical time signature of 4/4.

== Critical reception ==
Jonathan Andre of 365 Days of Inspiring Media gave a positive review of the song, saying "As far as the song goes, “Cover the Earth” has some serious Jesus Culture and Bethel Music vibes, as the guitar led inspiring mid-tempo worship anthem features both Kari and Cody ardently asking the Holy Spirit to cover the Earth, essentially praying for revival in our country and in the world." Andre concluded that the song is "simply magical."

== Commercial performance ==
"Cover the Earth" made its debut at number 29 on Billboard's Hot Christian Songs chart dated September 29, 2018. The song spent eight non-consecutive weeks on the chart.

The song debuted at No. 33 on the US Christian Airplay chart dated February 2, 2019. The song peaked at No. 31 and spent five consecutive weeks on the chart.

== Music videos ==
The live music video of "Cover the Earth" performed by Cody Carnes, recorded at Gateway Students Conference, was published on September 13, 2018, on Kari Jobe's YouTube channel. On September 14, 2018, the lyric video of "Cover the Earth" was published on Cody Carnes' YouTube channel. On September 26, 2018, the acoustic performance video of the song was released on Kari Jobe's YouTube channel.

== Track listing ==
"Cover the Earth"
No.	Title	Writer(s)	Producer	Length
1.	"Cover the Earth"	Cody Carnes; Daniella Young	Jacob Sooter	4:04

"Cover the Earth" — Re-release
No.	Title	Producer	Length
1.	"Cover the Earth"	Jacob Sooter	4:04
2.	"Cover the Earth" (Live)	Cody Carnes	6:10
Total length:			10:14

== Credits ==
Credits adapted from Tidal.

- Cody Carnes — primary artist (tracks 1–2), producer (track 1)
- Jeremy Edwardson — mixing (track 2)
- Kari Jobe — primary artist (tracks 1–2)
- Drew Lavyne — mastering engineer (tracks 1–2)
- Sean Moffit — mixing (track 1)

== Charts ==
Weekly chart performance for "Cover the Earth"
Chart (2018–2019)	Peak position
US Christian Songs (Billboard)	29
US Christian Airplay (Billboard)	31

== Release history ==
Region	Date	Format	Label	Ref.
Various	September 14, 2018	Digital download; streaming	Sparrow Records	
Various	October 19, 2018 (Re-release)	Digital download; streaming	Sparrow Records	
