= What Freedom Feels Like =

2017 song by Cody Carnes

Single by Cody Carnes

from the album The Darker the Night / The Brighter the Morning
- Released: July 14, 2017
- Recorded: 2017
- Genre: Contemporary Christian music
- Length: 3:05
- Label: Sparrow; Capitol CMG
- Songwriters: Cody Carnes; Lauren Strahm; Robert Marvin
- Producer: Jeremy Lutito

Cody Carnes singles chronology
"Til the End of Time" (2017)	"What Freedom Feels Like" (2017)	"Cover the Earth" (2018)

Music videos
- "What Freedom Feels Like" (Live) on YouTube
- "What Freedom Feels Like" (Lyrics) on YouTube

"What Freedom Feels Like" is a song by American Christian musician Cody Carnes. The song was released on July 14, 2017, as the fourth single from his debut studio album, The Darker the Night / The Brighter the Morning (2017). Carnes co-wrote the song with Lauren Strahm and Robert Marvin. Jeremy Lutito produced the single.

"What Freedom Feels Like" peaked at No. 44 on the US Hot Christian Songs chart.

== Background ==
Following the release of "What Freedom Feels Like" as an official single in July 2017, MultiTracks partnered with Cody Carnes and Capitol Christian Music Group for a special contest based on the song from early August to September 1, 2017. Contestants had to record their own cover of "What Freedom Feels Like" and upload it on Instagram using the tag #whatfreedomfeelslikecover in order to win MultiTracks-related prizes including MultiTracks resources for The Darker the Night / The Brighter the Morning and a Skype meeting with Cody Carnes.

== Composition ==
"What Freedom Feels Like" is composed in the key of C with a tempo of 114 beats per minute and a musical time signature of 4/4.

== Critical reception ==
Jonathan Andre of 365 Days of Inspiring Media in his review of the song, said "While the song sadly traps itself into the cycle of repetition (and thus could be great on radio), "What Freedom Feels Like" will definitely capture the K-Love (and/or Air1) crowd as Cody invites us to participate on a pop-radio song that is as catchy (and equally lyrically uninventive) as it is very much needed (message-wise) in the industry of entertainment today!"

== Commercial performance ==
"What Freedom Feels Like" debuted at number 42 on the US Christian Airplay chart dated January 13, 2018. The song went on to peak at No. 32 on the Christian Airplay chart.

"What Freedom Feels Like" debuted at No. 49 on the US Hot Christian Songs chart dated February 10, 2018, The song went on to peak at No. 44 on the Hot Christian Songs chart.

== Music videos ==
The lyric video of "What Freedom Feels Like" was published on July 14, 2017, on Cody Carnes' YouTube channel. The live music video of the song, performed by Cody Carnes, was published on September 15, 2017, on Cody Carnes' YouTube channel.

== Charts ==
Weekly chart performance for "What Freedom Feels Like"
Chart (2017–2018)	Peak position
US Christian Songs (Billboard)	44
US Christian Airplay (Billboard)	32

== Release history ==
Region	Date	Format	Label	Ref.
Various	July 14, 2017	Digital download; streaming	Sparrow Records	
