= Ain't Nobody (Cody Carnes song) =

2022 song by Cody Carnes

Single by Cody Carnes

from the album God Is Good!
- Released: September 30, 2022
- Recorded: July 2022
- Venue: The Belonging Co, Nashville, Tennessee, US
- Genre: Worship
- Length: 4:07 (live); 3:33 (radio version)
- Label: Sparrow; Capitol CMG
- Songwriters: Brandon Lake; Cody Carnes; Hank Bentley
- Producers: Aaron Robertson; Austin Davis; Hank Bentley; Jeff Pardo

Cody Carnes singles chronology
"Good (Can't Be Anything Else)" (2022)	"Ain't Nobody" (2022)

Music video
- "Ain't Nobody" on YouTube

"Ain't Nobody" is a song by American Contemporary Christian musician and worship leader Cody Carnes. The song was released on September 30, 2022, as the second single from his first live album, God Is Good! (2022). Carnes co-wrote the song with Brandon Lake and Hank Bentley. The single was produced by Aaron Robertson, Austin Davis, Hank Bentley, and Jeff Pardo.

"Ain't Nobody" peaked at No. 5 on the US Hot Christian Songs chart.

== Background ==
On September 2, 2022, Cody Carnes releasing "Ain't Nobody" as a promotional single in the lead-up to the release of his first live album, God Is Good!, being slated for September 30, 2022. Carnes also announced that the song would impact Christian radio on September 30, being the second official single from the album following the digital release of "Good (Can't Be Anything Else)". Carnes shared that the song is "a celebration of the love of Jesus and how it's impacted my life."

== Critical reception ==
Reviewing for Worship Leader, Christopher Watson said "Ain't Nobody" was one of the standout tracks from the album, describing it as a "soulful funk" song.

== Composition ==
"Ain't Nobody" is composed in the key of A with a tempo of 72 beats per minute and a musical time signature of 4/4.

== Commercial performance ==
"Ain't Nobody" made its debut at No. 30 on the US Christian Airplay chart dated September 10, 2022. "Ain't Nobody" went on to debut at No. 47 on the US Hot Christian Songs chart dated September 17, 2022.

== Music video ==
The official live performance video of "Ain't Nobody" was published on September 2, 2021, on Cody Carnes' YouTube channel. The video shows Carnes leading the song in worship, filmed at The Belonging Co in Nashville, Tennessee.

== Track listing ==
"Ain't Nobody"
No.	Title	Writer(s)	Producer(s)	Length
1.	"Ain't Nobody"	Hank Bentley; Cody Carnes; Brandon Lake	Aaron Robertson; Austin Davis	4:07
2.	"Good (Can't Be Anything Else)"	Carnes; Aodhan King	Aaron Robertson; Austin Davis	9:52
3.	"Ain't Nobody" (Radio Version)	Bentley; Carnes; Lake	Aaron Robertson; Austin Davis; Hank Bentley; Jeff Pardo	3:33
Total length:				17:33

== Personnel ==
Credits adapted from AllMusic.

- Jacob Arnold — drums, percussion
- Jonathan Baines — choir/chorus
- Lorenzo Baylor — choir/chorus
- Hank Bentley — acoustic guitar, background vocals, electric guitar, Hammond organ, piano, producer, programming
- Chris Bevins — editing
- Alex Bivens — choir/chorus
- Cody Carnes — acoustic guitar, background vocals, percussion, piano, primary artist, vocals
- Jess Carpenter — choir/chorus
- Angelique Carter — choir/chorus
- Mike Cervantes — mastering engineer
- Chad Chrisman — A&R
- Amanda Cockrell — choir/chorus
- Marci Coleman — choir/chorus
- Austin Davis — drums, producer
- Garrett Davis — A&R
- Donte Dowlling — engineer
- Jackson Dreyer — choir/chorus
- Tito Ebiwonjumi — choir/chorus
- Eddie Edwards — electric guitar
- Enaka Enyong — choir/chorus
- Jenna Lee Fair — choir/chorus
- Devin Feldman — engineer
- Carissa Fernald — choir/chorus
- Evan Fernald — piano
- Gavin Garris — choir/chorus
- Sam Gibson — mastering engineer, mixing
- Jayci Gorza — choir/chorus
- Olivia Grasso — choir/chorus
- Brad Guldemond — choir/chorus
- Baily Hager — choir/chorus
- Bernie Herms — Hammond B3
- Chelsea Howard — choir/chorus
- Kari Jobe — background vocals
- Joel Okaah — choir/chorus
- Nicole Johnson — choir/chorus
- Ashley Jolley — choir/chorus
- Graham King — engineer
- Benji Kuriakose — choir/chorus
- Shantrice Laura — background vocals
- Tony Lucido — bass
- Christian Mason — choir/chorus
- Brenton Miles — background vocals, electric guitar, engineer
- Casey Moore — electric guitar
- Noah Moreno — choir/chorus
- Kittie Carreker Morgan — choir/chorus
- Tayler Moses — choir/chorus
- Angela Nasby — choir/chorus
- Jack Nellis — engineer
- Christina Onstott — choir/chorus
- Jeff Pardo — keyboards, producer, programming
- Brady Pendergrass — choir/chorus
- Kelsei Peppars — choir/chorus
- Cory Pierce — electric guitar
- Jordyn Pierce — choir/chorus
- Edwin Portillo — choir/chorus
- Kyle Pruzina — choir/chorus
- Marci Pruzina — choir/chorus
- Aaron Robertson — keyboards, producer, programming, synthesizer
- Alyssa Rodriguez — choir/chorus
- Emily Ruff — choir/chorus
- Matt Sanders — choir/chorus
- Gilbert Sauceda — choir/chorus
- Rylee Scott — choir/chorus
- Setnick T. Sene — choir/chorus
- Sharon Okaah — choir/chorus
- Lydia Shaw — choir/chorus
- Sophie Shear — choir/chorus
- Kendall Smith — choir/chorus
- Zack Smith — choir/chorus
- Kelley Sparks — choir/chorus
- Blake Stafford — choir/chorus
- Cheryl Stark — choir/chorus
- Kirsten Strahley — choir/chorus
- Jordan Stribling — choir/chorus
- Keithon Stribling — background vocals
- Cody Sullivan — choir/chorus
- Bria Valderrama — choir/chorus
- Robby Valderrama — choir/chorus
- Doug Weier — mixing
- Mitch Wong — background vocals
- Steph Wong — choir/chorus
- Shae Wooten — bass, synthesizer bass
- Ashley Wright — choir/chorus
- Daniella Young — background vocals, choir/chorus

== Charts ==
=== Weekly charts ===
Weekly chart performance for "Ain't Nobody"
Chart (2022–2023)	Peak position
US Christian Songs (Billboard)	5
US Christian Airplay (Billboard)	2
US Christian AC (Billboard)	2

=== Year-end charts ===
Year-end chart performance for "Ain't Nobody"
Chart (2023)	Position
US Christian Songs (Billboard)	6
US Christian Airplay (Billboard)	7
US Christian AC (Billboard)	11

== Release history ==
Release dates and formats for "Ain't Nobody"
Region	Date	Format	Label	Ref.
Various	September 23, 2022	Digital download; streaming; (promotional release)	Sparrow; Capitol CMG	
United States	September 30, 2022	Christian contemporary hit radio	Sparrow; Capitol CMG	
