= The Blessing (song) =

2020 song by Kari Jobe, Cody Carnes and Elevation Worship

Single by Kari Jobe, Cody Carnes and Elevation Worship

from the album Graves into Gardens
- Released: March 20, 2020
- Recorded: March 1, 2020
- Venue: Elevation Ballantyne, Charlotte, North Carolina, US
- Genre: Contemporary worship music
- Length: 8:34 (live version); 8:27 (album version); 4:35 (radio version)
- Label: Elevation Worship; Sparrow; Capitol CMG
- Songwriters: Kari Jobe; Cody Carnes; Steven Furtick; Chris Brown
- Producer: C. Brown

Kari Jobe singles chronology
"Cover the Earth" (2018)	"The Blessing" (2020)

Cody Carnes singles chronology
"Christ Be Magnified" (2020)	"The Blessing" (2020)	"Too Good to Not Believe" (2021)

Elevation Worship singles chronology
"Impresionante" (2020)	"The Blessing" (2020)	"Graves into Gardens" (2020)

Music videos
- "The Blessing" (Live from Elevation Ballantyne) on YouTube
- "The Blessing" (Living Room Session) on YouTube
- "The Blessing" (Live from Home) on YouTube
- "The Blessing" (Lyrics) on YouTube

"The Blessing" is a song performed by Kari Jobe, Cody Carnes and Elevation Worship, released as the lead single from Elevation Worship's twelfth live album, Graves into Gardens (2020), as well as Kari Jobe's third live album, The Blessing (2020), on March 20, 2020. The song was written by Chris Brown, Cody Carnes, Kari Jobe and Steven Furtick. Chris Brown handled the production of the single.

"The Blessing" was a commercial success upon its release, having debuted at No. 3 on the US Hot Christian Songs chart. It peaked at No. 2 on Hot Christian Songs chart, and No. 15 on the Bubbling Under Hot 100. It has been certified gold by Recording Industry Association of America (RIAA). "The Blessing" won the GMA Dove Award for Worship Recorded Song of the Year at the 2020 GMA Dove Awards, and the GMA Dove Award for Song of the Year at the 2021 GMA Dove Awards. It has also garnered a Grammy Award nomination for Best Contemporary Christian Music Performance/Song at the 2021 Grammy Awards. It was further recorded into dozens of cover versions by various artists, produced in various languages and in different parts of the world.

== Background ==
Initially, "The Blessing" was released as music video on Elevation Worship's YouTube channel in early March 2020, with Kari Jobe and Cody Carnes leading the song in a worship service at Elevation Church's Ballantyne campus on March 1. Jobe, Carnes had written the song together with Steven Furtick and Chris Brown in a writing session on Thursday, February 27, 2020, at Elevation prior to leading it at Elevation's Sunday service on March 1, 2020. The song became popular on YouTube, leading to the release of the live audio recording on March 20, 2020, to other platforms. The song's music video had garnered over 3 million views on YouTube at the time of its release.

"The Blessing" was serviced to Christian radio stations on May 1, 2020.

== Composition ==
"The Blessing" is composed in the key of B with a tempo of 70 beats per minute and a musical time signature of 4/4. Carnes' and Jobe's vocal range spans from F♯_{3} to E_{5}.

The lyrics are largely taken from the Priestly Blessing found in the Book of Numbers within the Old Testament of the Bible.

== Commercial performance ==
On the Hot Christian Songs chart dated April 4, 2020, the song debuted at No. 3, while also peaking at No. 4 on the US Digital Song Sales chart. The song had sold 12,000 downloads and garnered 1.3 million streams in its first week, and thus becoming Kari Jobe's and Elevation Worship's fourth top ten hit on Hot Christian Songs and Cody Carnes first top ten on the chart, as well as the highest debut for all three acts. The song is also the highest-charting faith-based song on Digital Song Sales chart in four years since Jordan Smith's rendition of "Great Is Thy Faithfulness" peaked at No. 3 in December 2015.

== Music videos ==
On March 6, 2020, Elevation Worship released the live music video of "The Blessing" featuring Kari Jobe and Cody Carnes recorded at Elevation Church's Ballantyne campus on its YouTube channel. Cody Carnes released a "Live from Home" performance video featuring Kari Jobe to YouTube on March 19, 2020. On March 31, 2020, a "Living Room Session" performance video of the song was uploaded by Elevation Worship to YouTube. Kari Jobe published the lyric video of the song on YouTube on April 8, 2020.

Additionally, many worship leaders and churches throughout the world released cover versions in their native languages. A compilation cover video was released to Youtube on November 24, 2021 featuring 12,000 worshipers singing in 257 different languages.

== Accolades ==
Awards
Year	Organization	Award	Result	Ref
2020	GMA Dove Awards	Worship Recorded Song of the Year	Won	
2021	Grammy Awards	Best Contemporary Christian Music Performance/Song	Nominated	
2021	Billboard Music Awards	Top Christian Song	Nominated	
2021	GMA Dove Awards	Song of the Year	Won	

== Track listing ==
"The Blessing (Live)"
No.	Title	Writer(s)	Length
1.	"The Blessing" (Live)	Kari Jobe; Cody Carnes; Steven Furtick; Chris Brown	8:34

"The Blessing (Live)" – Apple Music bonus content
No.	Title	Length
2.	"The Blessing" (Live From Elevation Church Ballantyne, Charlotte, NC, March 1, 2020; Music Video)	12:10
Total length:		20:44

The Blessing EP – Kari Jobe
No.	Title	Length
1.	"The Blessing" (featuring Cody Carnes)	7:03
2.	"The Blessing" (featuring Cody Carnes; Cinematic Version)	6:41
3.	"The Blessing" (featuring Cody Carnes; Radio Version)	4:33
4.	"The Blessing" (featuring Cody Carnes; Radio Alternate Version)	4:33
5.	"The Blessing" (featuring Cody Carnes; Radio Alternate Version 2)	4:33
Total length:		27:53

The Blessing EP – Apple Music bonus content
No.	Title	Length
6.	"The Blessing" (featuring Cody Carnes; Studio Version/Lyric Video)	7:04
Total length:		34:57

== Charts ==
=== Weekly charts ===
Weekly chart performance for "The Blessing"
Chart (2020)	Peak position
Canada Hot Canadian Digital Songs (Billboard)	27
US Bubbling Under Hot 100 (Billboard)	15
US Hot Christian Songs (Billboard)	2
US Christian Airplay (Billboard)	7
US Christian AC (Billboard)	5
US Digital Song Sales (Billboard)	4

=== Year-end charts ===
Year-end chart performance for "The Blessing"
Chart (2020)	Position
US Christian Songs (Billboard)	3
US Christian Airplay (Billboard)	25
US Christian AC (Billboard)	18
Chart (2021)	Position
US Christian Songs (Billboard)	84
Chart (2025)	Position
US Christian Digital Song Sales (Billboard)	25

== Certifications ==
Region	Certification	Certified units/sales
New Zealand (RMNZ)	Platinum	30,000^{‡}
United States (RIAA)	2× Platinum	2,000,000^{‡}
^{‡} Sales+streaming figures based on certification alone.

== Release history ==
Region	Version	Date	Format	Label	Ref.
Various	Live	March 20, 2020	Digital download; streaming	Elevation Worship Records; Sparrow; Capitol CMG	
United States	Radio	May 1, 2020	Christian radio	Elevation Worship Records; Sparrow; Capitol CMG	
Various	EP (Kari Jobe featuring Cody Carnes)	May 22, 2020	Digital download; streaming	Sparrow; Capitol CMG	

== Cover versions ==
"I'm so moved by this song and how quickly it came about, because this song is based on Scripture, the message is timeless, and we wanted to release it as quickly as we could, knowing the effect it could have on people's hearts and spirits immediately, as it did ours.

— Kari Jobe, on the decision to speedily release the song.
- Bethel Music and We the Kingdom collaborated on a rendition of the song which was released on Bethel's album, Peace (2020). Bethel Music artist Sean Feucht released a live performance cover of the song featuring Emmy Rose to YouTube.
- In early April 2020, Selena Gomez released a video performing a cover of the song with Anna Golden and Liz Golden at home on Instagram.
- On Easter Sunday 2020, singers from almost 30 churches in Pittsburgh released "The Pittsburgh Blessing," the first in a series of similar compilations from cities, countries, and regions around the world.
- On May 3, The UK Blessing channel released a collective version that included contributions from over 65 United Kingdom churches and movements, and tens of other individuals, coming together to sing the song online, with the aim of spreading hope and encouragement during the COVID-19 pandemic. The video included the message: "Churches around the UK have come together at this time, to sing a blessing over the nation"; and, "Our buildings may be closed, but the Church is Alive."
- On May 16, Canadian churches released their version, noting: "The Church in Canada is beautiful, broad and diverse and it is a nearly impossible task to accurately represent the full breadth of true diversity within the church in Canada from coast to coast to coast."
- On August 20, the New Zealand cover version was released. "The Blessing Aotearoa" features more than 200 individuals. This version is mostly in English with a verse in Te Reo Māori and parts in NZSL.
- On July 24, 2021, Justin Bieber performed the song along with Jobe and Carnes at SoFi Stadium during the "Freedom Experience", an event put on in order to help socially disadvantaged communities in southern California.
