= Nothing Else (Cody Carnes song) =

Single by Cody Carnes

from the album Run to the Father
- Released: January 4, 2019
- Recorded: 2018
- Genre: Contemporary worship music
- Length: 6:33
- Label: Sparrow; Capitol CMG
- Songwriters: Cody Carnes; Hank Bentley; Jessie Early
- Producers: Cody Carnes; Austin Davis; McKendree Tucker

Cody Carnes singles chronology
"Cover the Earth" (2018)	"Nothing Else" (2019)	"Heaven Fall" (2019)

Music videos
- "Nothing Else" (Live) on YouTube
- "Nothing Else" (Lyrics) on YouTube

"Nothing Else" is a song by American Christian musician Cody Carnes. The song was released on January 4, 2019, as the lead single from his second studio album, Run to the Father (2020). Carnes co-wrote the song with Hank Bentley and Jessie Early. Carnes collaborated with Austin Davis and McKendree Tucker in producing the single.

"Nothing Else" peaked at No. 31 on the US Hot Christian Songs chart.

== Background ==
"Nothing Else" was Cody Carnes' first single of 2019, following the release of "Cover the Earth" alongside Kari Jobe in 2018. Carnes shared the story behind the song with FreeCCM.

== Composition ==
"Nothing Else" is composed in the key of C with a tempo of 68 beats per minute and a musical time signature of 4/4.

== Commercial performance ==
"Nothing Else" debuted at No. 35 on the US Hot Christian Songs chart dated January 19, 2019, concurrently charting at No. 17 on the Christian Digital Song Sales chart.

== Music videos ==
The lyric video of "Nothing Else" was published on January 2, 2019, on Cody Carnes' YouTube channel. The live music video of the song, performed by Cody Carnes, recorded at Passion 2019, was published on February 6, 2019, on Cody Carnes' YouTube channel.

== Track listing ==
"Nothing Else"
No.	Title	Length
1.	"Nothing Else"	6:33
2.	"Nothing Else" (Live From Passion 2019)	8:19

== Charts ==
=== Weekly charts ===
Weekly chart performance for "Nothing Else"
Chart (2019)	Peak position
US Christian Songs (Billboard)	31

=== Year-end charts ===
Year-end chart performance for "Nothing Else"
Chart (2019)	Position
US Christian Songs (Billboard)	69

== Certifications ==
Region	Certification	Certified units/sales
United States (RIAA)	Gold	500,000^{‡}
^{‡} Sales+streaming figures based on certification alone.

== Release history ==
Region	Date	Format	Label	Ref.
Various	January 4, 2019	Digital download; streaming	Sparrow Records	
Various	April 5, 2019 (Re-release)	Digital download; streaming	Sparrow Records	
