= Cody Carnes =

American Christian musician (born 1989)

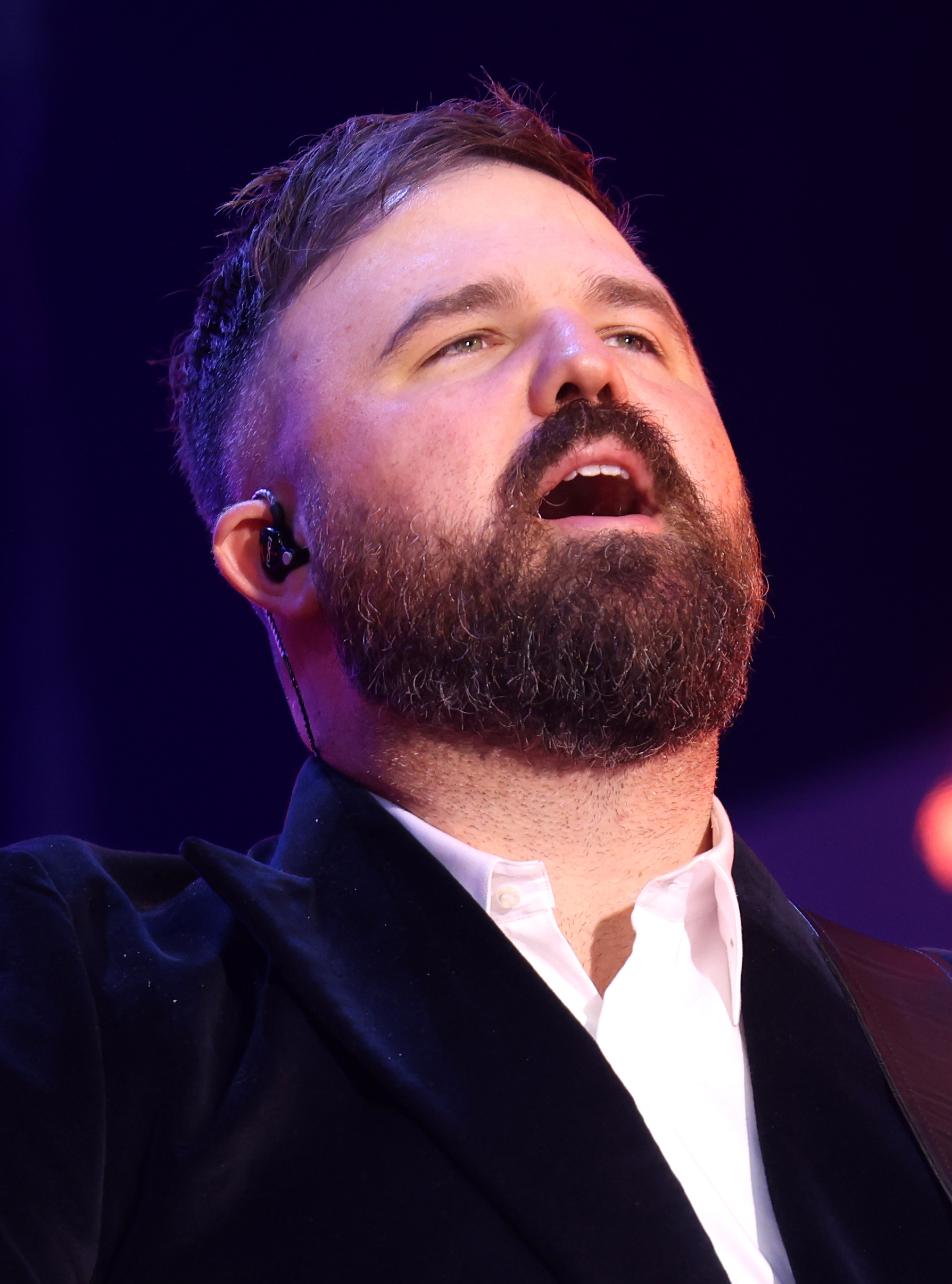
- Carnes in 2025

Background information
- Born: Cody Jay Carnes; March 25, 1989 (age 37); Atlanta, Georgia, U.S.
- Origin: Dallas, Texas, U.S.
- Genres: CCM; contemporary worship
- Occupations: Singer; musician; songwriter; worship leader
- Instruments: Vocals; guitar
- Years active: 2009–present
- Labels: Gateway Create; Sparrow; Capitol CMG
- Member of: The Belonging Co
- Formerly of: Gateway Worship
- Spouse: Kari Jobe (m. 2014)
- Website: Official website

Cody Jay Carnes (born March 25, 1989) is an American contemporary Christian music singer, songwriter and worship pastor. Carnes launched his solo music career in 2017 after signing with Capitol Christian Music Group, with the release of his debut studio album, The Darker the Night / The Brighter the Morning. His second studio album, Run to the Father, released in 2020, was nominated as Best Contemporary Christian Music Album at the 63rd Annual Grammy Awards. Carnes was featured alongside Kari Jobe and Elevation Worship on the single "The Blessing", which won the 2020 GMA Dove Award for the Worship Recorded Song of the Year at the 51st GMA Dove Awards (and was nominated for the Best Contemporary Christian Music Performance/Song at that year's Grammys).

== Career ==
In the early 2010s, Cody Carnes began singing as part of Gateway Worship, while serving as a worship pastor at Gateway Church, in Dallas, Texas. In 2014, Carnes released the extended play, All He Says I Am.

On February 24, 2017, Capitol Christian Music Group announced that Cody Carnes had signed with the label, while releasing his first single called "The Cross Has the Final Word", in the lead-up to his debut album slated for release in 2017. "The Cross Has the Final Word" debuted at No. 45 on the US Hot Christian Songs chart. On April 7, 2017, Carnes released "Hold It All" as the second single from his debut album. Cody Carnes released "Til the End of Time" featuring Kari Jobe as the third single from his debut album on June 16, 2017. "Til the End of Time" debuted at No. 50 on the US Hot Christian Songs chart. On July 14, 2017, Carnes released "What Freedom Feels Like" as the fourth single from his debut album, revealed to be titled The Darker the Night / The Brighter the Morning, and slated for release on September 15, 2017. "What Freedom Feels Like" peaked at No. 44 on the US Hot Christian Songs chart. The Darker the Night / The Brighter the Morning was released on September 15, 2017. The album debuted at No. 17, on the US Top Christian Albums chart. On September 14, 2018, Kari Jobe and Cody Carnes released "Cover the Earth" as a standalone single. The song peaked at No. 29 on the US Hot Christian Songs chart.

On January 4, 2019, Cody Carnes released "Nothing Else" as a single. "Nothing Else" peaked at No. 31 on the US Hot Christian Songs chart. Carnes released his second single of the year, "Heaven Fall", on March 8, 2019. On July 26, 2019, Carnes released "Run to the Father" as a single. "Run to the Father" peaked at No. 23 on the US Hot Christian Songs chart. Carnes released "Christ Be Magnified" as a single on January 1, 2020. "Christ Be Magnified" debuted at No. 45 on the US Hot Christian Songs chart. Carnes released his second studio album, Run to the Father on March 13, 2020. Run to the Father debuted at No. 12 on the Top Christian Albums chart. The album was nominated for the Grammy Award for Best Contemporary Christian Music Album at the 63rd Annual Grammy Awards.

On March 20, 2020, Cody Carnes alongside Kari Jobe and Elevation Worship released "The Blessing" as a single. The song peaked at No. 2 on the Hot Christian Songs chart, and No. 15 on the Bubbling Under Hot 100 chart. "The Blessing" won the GMA Dove Award for Worship Recorded Song of the Year at the 2020 GMA Dove Awards. The song was also nominated for Best Contemporary Christian Music Performance/Song at the 63rd Annual Grammy Awards, and the Billboard Music Award for Top Christian Song at the 2021 Billboard Music Awards.

On May 28, 2021, Cody Carnes and Brandon Lake released "Too Good to Not Believe" as a single. "Too Good to Not Believe" peaked at No. 45 on the Hot Christian Songs chart. On August 20, 2021, Carnes alongside Hillsong Worship and Reuben Morgan released "Hope of the Ages" as a single. "Hope of the Ages" debuted at No. 49 on the US Hot Christian Songs chart. On December 10, 2021, Cody Carnes released "Firm Foundation (He Won't)" as a single. "Firm Foundation (He Won't)" peaked at No. 15 on the US Hot Christian Songs chart.

On January 3, 2022, Carnes featured on a live version of "Firm Foundation (He Won't)" released by Maverick City Music alongside Chandler Moore as a standalone single. This version of "Firm Foundation (He Won't)" reached No. 33 on the Hot Christian Songs chart. On April 15, 2022, Carnes featured on a new version of "The Commission" released by Cain. Carnes released "Be Glad" as a standalone single on July 15, 2022. On August 19, 2022, Carnes released "Good (Can't Be Anything Else)" as the lead single to his upcoming live album. On September 2, 2022, Carnes announced the release of his upcoming live album, God Is Good!, being slated for September 30, 2022, concurrently releasing "Ain't Nobody" as an instant-grat track and the second single from the album slated to impact Christian radio on September 30. "Ain't Nobody" peaked at No. 5 on the Hot Christian Songs chart. On September 30, 2022, Cody Carnes released his first live album, God Is Good!. God Is Good! debuted at No. 45 on the Top Christian Albums chart. On October 10, 2022, Cody Carnes announced his first headlining tour, dubbed the God Is Good! Tour, joined by Benjamin William Hastings as a special guest and set to visit eight cities across the United States in February 2023.

On September 21, 2025, Carnes and his wife Kari Jobe led worship for the memorial service for Charlie Kirk (who was killed on the 10th, in Utah), a service held at State Farm Stadium in Phoenix, Arizona.

== Personal life ==
Cody Carnes married Kari Jobe on November 21, 2014. They have two sons.

== Discography ==
Studio albums

- The Darker the Night / The Brighter the Morning (2017)
- Run to the Father (2020)

Live albums

- God Is Good! (2022)
- Firm Foundation (2023)

== Tours ==
Headlining

- God Is Good! Tour (2023)
- Worship Together Nights Tour with Bryan & Katie Torwalt and Jonathan Traylor (2023)

Supporting

- Heaven Tour with Mosaic MSC, Mack Brock, and Local Sound (2018)
- Only Jesus Tour with Casting Crowns, Kari Jobe, and Jamie Kimmett (2019)
- The Blessing USA Tour with Kari Jobe (2021)
- Chris Tomlin, Kari Jobe, Bethel Music Live in Concert (2021)
- Elevation Worship Summer Tour with Elevation Worship and Kari Jobe (2022)

== Awards and nominations ==
=== Billboard Music Awards ===
Year	Nominee / work	Award	Result	Ref.
2021	"The Blessing" (with Kari Jobe and Elevation Worship)	Top Christian Song	Nominated	

=== GMA Dove Awards ===
Year	Nominee / work	Award	Result	Ref.
2020	"The Blessing" (with Kari Jobe and Elevation Worship)	Worship Recorded Song of the Year	Won	
2021	"The Blessing"	Song of the Year	Won	
2021	The Blessing (Note: Carnes was credited as a producer on The Blessing by Kari Jobe.) (Kari Jobe)	Worship Album of the Year	Nominated	
2023	God Is Good! (Live)	Worship Album of the Year	Nominated	
2023	God Is Good! (Live)	Long Form Video of the Year	Nominated	
2024	Cody Carnes	Songwriter of the Year - Artist	Nominated	
2024	"Firm Foundation (He Won't)"	Song of the Year	Nominated	
2024	"Firm Foundation (He Won't)"	Worship Recorded Song of the Year	Nominated	
2024	"Praise" (Note: Carnes was credited as a co-writer on "Praise" by Elevation Worship.) (Elevation Worship featuring Brandon Lake, Chris Brown, Chandler Moore)	Song of the Year	Nominated	
2024	"Praise" (Elevation Worship featuring Brandon Lake, Chris Brown, Chandler Moore)	Worship Recorded Song of the Year	Nominated	
2024	"Alaba" (Note: Carnes was credited as a co-writer on "Alaba" by Elevation Worship.) (Elevation Worship, Elevation Espanol, Unified Sound)	Spanish Language Worship Recorded Song of the Year	Nominated	
2024	Firm Foundation (Live)	Worship Album of the Year	Nominated	

=== Grammy Awards ===
Year	Nominee / work	Award	Result	Ref.
2021	"The Blessing" (with Kari Jobe and Elevation Worship)	Best Contemporary Christian Music Performance/Song	Nominated	
2021	Run to the Father	Best Contemporary Christian Music Album	Nominated	
