= This Is the Kingdom =

2022 song by Elevation Worship

Promotional single by Elevation Worship featuring Pat Barrett

from the album Lion
- Released: February 4, 2022
- Recorded: 2021
- Genre: Contemporary worship music
- Length: 9:57
- Label: Elevation Worship
- Songwriters: Chris Brown; Jason Ingram; Pat Barrett; Steven Furtick
- Producers: Chris Brown; Steven Furtick

Music videos
- "This Is the Kingdom" on YouTube
- "This Is the Kingdom" (Lyrics) on YouTube

"This Is the Kingdom" is a song performed by American contemporary worship band Elevation Worship featuring Pat Barrett, which was released as a promotional single from their tenth live album, Lion (2022), on February 18, 2022. The song was written by Chris Brown, Jason Ingram, Pat Barrett, and Steven Furtick.

"This Is the Kingdom" peaked at No. 27 on the US Hot Christian Songs chart despite not being an official single.

== Background ==
On February 18, 2022, Elevation Worship released "This Is the Kingdom" featuring Pat Barrett as the third promotional single in the lead-up to the release of its parent album, Lion (2022), following the releases of "Same God" and "What I See." The song is based on the Beatitudes in Matthew 5, and is split into two tracks, the second track being a spontaneous flow of worship, the tracks combined running for over fourteen minutes long.

== Composition ==
"This Is the Kingdom" is composed in the key of A with a tempo of 73 beats per minute, and a musical time signature of 4/4.

== Commercial performance ==
"This Is the Kingdom" debuted at number 44 on the US Hot Christian Songs chart dated March 5, 2022.

== Music videos ==
Elevation Worship released the music video for "This Is the Kingdom" featuring Pat Barrett leading the song during an Elevation Church worship service, via YouTube on February 18, 2022. The official lyric video for the song was issued by Elevation Worship through YouTube on March 4, 2022.

== Track listing ==
"This Is the Kingdom"
No.	Title	Length
1.	"This Is the Kingdom" (featuring Pat Barrett)	9:57

"This Is the Kingdom (Flow)"
No.	Title	Length
1.	"This Is the Kingdom (Flow)" (featuring Pat Barrett)	4:36

== Charts ==
Chart performance for "This Is the Kingdom"
Chart (2022)	Peak position
US Hot Christian Songs (Billboard)	27

== Release history ==
Release history and formats for "This Is the Kingdom"
Region	Date	Format	Label	Ref.
Various	February 18, 2022	Digital download; streaming; (promotional release)	Elevation Worship Records	
