= House of Miracles (Live) =

2021 live album by Brandon Lake

Live album by Brandon Lake
- Released: January 22, 2021
- Recorded: 2020
- Genre: Contemporary worship music
- Length: 92:36
- Label: Bethel Music
- Producer: David Leonard; Brad King; Seth Talley

Brandon Lake chronology
House of Miracles (2020)	House of Miracles (Live) (2021)	Almond Eyes (2021)

House of Miracles (Live) is the first live album by American contemporary worship musician Brandon Lake. Bethel Music released the album on January 22, 2021. The album contains guest appearances by Dante Bowe, Matt Maher, Silverberg, Leeland, and Sarah Reeves. The album was produced by David Leonard, Brad King, and Seth Talley.

The album debuted at number twenty-nine on the US Top Christian Albums chart. House of Miracles (Live) received a nomination for the GMA Dove Award Long Form Video of the Year at the 2021 GMA Dove Awards.

== Background ==
On January 22, 2021, House of Miracles (Live) was released as a live companion piece to the original studio project, House of Miracles, which was released in August 2020. It contains the live renditions of songs previously released on the studio album, as well as new songs "Show Me Your Glory", "When the Glory's in the Room" and "Living Sacrifices".

== Release and promotion ==
"House of Miracles" was released on January 8, 2021, as the first promotional single from the album, concurrently launching the album's digital pre-order.

== Reception ==
=== Critical response ===
Professional ratings
Review scores
Source	Rating
365 Days of Inspiring Media	2.5/5

In a positive review for Worship Leader, Randy Cross said of the album: "This powerhouse of worship launches with the declarative title track as an anthem for the church to proclaim to a pandemic-weary world, that there is hope, love and miracles in the gathering of believers." Jonathan Andre in his 365 Days of Inspiring Media review described House of Miracles (Live) as "mixed bag for sure" while comparing it with the studio album which he said was "more cohesive, impacting and comforting."

=== Accolades ===
Awards
Year	Organization	Award	Result	Ref
2021	GMA Dove Awards	Long Form Video of the Year	Nominated	

== Chart performance ==
In the United States, House of Miracles (Live) debuted at number 29 on the Billboard Top Christian Albums chart dated February 6, 2021.

== Track listing ==
House of Miracles
No.	Title	Writer(s)	Length
1.	"Running to the Light"	Ben Hastings; Brandon Lake; Dante Bowe	5:14
2.	"Son of Heaven" (featuring Dante Bowe and Matt Maher)	Matt Maher; Lake; Bowe	15:31
3.	"Just Like Heaven"	Lake; Jacob Sooter; Jeff Schneeweis	9:16
4.	"Gratitude"	Hastings; Lake; Bowe	9:13
5.	"House of Miracles"	Sooter; Lake	7:33
6.	"House of Miracles (Prayer)" (featuring Silverberg)	Lake; Joshua Silverberg	9:32
7.	"Show Me Your Glory" (featuring Leeland)	Leeland Mooring; Brandon Lake	9:14
8.	"When the Glory's in the Room (Spontaneous)"	Mooring; Lake	6:21
9.	"Living Sacrifice"	Lake; Mitch Wong	8:21
10.	"Lost in Your Love" (featuring Sarah Reeves)	Lake; Sarah Reeves	8:15
11.	"I Need a Ghost" (featuring Dante Bowe)	Silverberg; Lake	4:06
Total length:			92:36

- Songwriting credits adapted from PraiseCharts.

== Charts ==
Chart performance for House of Miracles (Live)
Chart (2020)	Peak position
US Top Christian Albums (Billboard)	29

== Release history ==
Region	Date	Format	Label	Ref.
Various	January 22, 2021	Digital download; streaming	Bethel Music	
