= Praise (Elevation Worship song) =

2023 song by Elevation Worship

- EP cover

Single by Elevation Worship featuring Brandon Lake, Chris Brown and Chandler Moore

from the album Can You Imagine?
- Released: February 12, 2024
- Venue: Elevation Ballantyne, Charlotte, North Carolina, US
- Genre: Contemporary worship music
- Length: 5:04 (album version); 3:59 (radio version)
- Label: Elevation Worship
- Songwriters: Chris Brown; Steven Furtick; Brandon Lake; Chandler Moore; Pat Barrett; Cody Carnes
- Producers: Chris Brown; Chandler Moore; Steven Furtick

Elevation Worship singles chronology
"Another One" (2024)	"Praise" (2024)	"All of a Sudden" (2024)

Brandon Lake singles chronology
"Nothing New (I Do)" (2024)	"Praise" (2024)	"Miracle Child" (2024)

Chris Brown singles chronology
"In the Room" (2023)	"Praise" (2024)	"All of a Sudden" (2024)

Chandler Moore singles chronology
"More Than Able" (2023)	"Praise" (2024)	"In the Name of Jesus" (2024)

Music video
- "Praise" on YouTube
- "Praise" (Lyrics) on YouTube

"Praise" is a song performed by American contemporary worship band Elevation Worship featuring Brandon Lake, Chris Brown and Chandler Moore. On February 12, 2024, it impacted Christian radio stations in the United States as the third single from their eleventh live album, Can You Imagine? (2023). The song was written by Lake, Moore, Brown, Cody Carnes, Pat Barrett, and Steven Furtick.

In 2024, "Praise" peaked at No. 1 on the US Hot Christian Songs chart, and remained there for 31 weeks. The song also went on to peak at No. 5 on the Bubbling Under Hot 100 chart. It received the Worship Recorded Song of the Year Dove Award.

On January 3, 2026, KB and Nobigdyl released a cover of the song, under the title "Got a Reason".

== Background ==
It was released as the eighth and final track from their eleventh live album, Can You Imagine? (2023), on May 19, 2023. An extended play of the song was released on February 12, 2024, on Christian radio stations in the United States. "Praise" is the third single from Can You Imagine?, following the releases of "More Than Able" and "Trust in God" which preceded the album.

== Composition ==
"Praise" is composed in the key of A with a tempo of 127 beats per minute, and a musical time signature of 4/4. The song begins with a line from Psalm 150: "Let everything that has breath praise the Lord". Its first verse is about the commitment to commend God in all ways ("I'll praise in the valley / Praise on the mountain / I'll praise when I'm sure / Praise when I'm doubting"), while the second verse has a similar subject matter but sees the narrator fighting for God ("I'll praise when outnumbered / Praise when surrounded"). The verse also contains the lyric "praise is the waters / My enemies drown in", which captures the imagery of "mass death" according to Christianity Today's Kelsey Kramer Mcginnis.

== Reception ==
=== Critical response ===
In a NewReleaseToday review, Jasmin Patterson described "Praise" as "a high-energy "take you to church" moment." Timothy Yap of JubileeCast opined "In a ballad-heavy album, it's good to see the trio break loose and have fun on what sounds like a very raw and authentic praise session. This is so nourishing for the soul." Writing for Air1, Lindsay Williams said: "You know a song has no chance of being bad when Elevation Worship, Brandon Lake and Chandler Moore join forces."

=== Awards and nominations ===
Awards
Year	Organization	Award	Result	Ref
2024	ASCAP Christian Music Awards	Most Performed ASCAP Christian Songs of 2023	Won	
2024	GMA Dove Awards	Song of the Year	Nominated	
2024	GMA Dove Awards	Worship Recorded Song of the Year	Won	

== Commercial performance ==
"Praise" debuted at No. 22 on the US Hot Christian Songs chart dated June 3, 2023, concurrently charting at No. 9 on the Christian Digital Song Sales chart. "Praise" debuted at No. 48 on the US Christian Airplay chart dated September 30, 2023.

The song reached number one on the Hot Christian Songs chart dated March 16, 2024, with significant gains in streaming, downloads, and airplay, following the release of the EP. It stayed there for 31 weeks.

"Praise" marks the third Hot Christian Songs chart-topping song for Elevation Worship, the fourth for Brandon Lake, and the first for both Chris Brown and Chandler Moore.

== Music videos ==
The official lyric video for "Praise" was issued by Elevation Worship through YouTube on May 19, 2023. Elevation Worship released the music video for "Praise" featuring Brandon Lake, Chris Brown, and Chandler Moore leading the song during an Elevation Church worship service, via YouTube on May 22, 2023.

== Performances ==
Elevation Worship performed "Praise" at the 54th GMA Dove Awards held on October 17, 2023.

== Track listing ==
"Praise" (EP)
No.	Title	Producer(s)	Length
1.	"Praise" (Radio Version)	Aaron Robertson	3:59
2.	"Praise" (featuring Brandon Lake, Chris Brown and Chandler Moore)	Chris Brown; Chandler Moore; Steven Furtick	5:04
3.	"Praise" (Carolina Version)	Chris Brown; Jonathan Mix	4:02
4.	"Praise" (with Elevation Español and Unified Sound)	Joel Lopez; Edgar Aguilar	5:02
5.	"Praise" (Alastair Remix)	Graham King	3:59

== Charts ==
=== Weekly charts ===
Weekly chart performance for "Praise"
Chart (2023–2024)	Peak position
US Bubbling Under Hot 100 (Billboard)	5
US Hot Christian Songs (Billboard)	1
US Christian Airplay (Billboard)	1
US Christian AC (Billboard)	1

=== Year-end charts ===
Year-end chart performance for "Praise"
Chart (2023)	Position
US Hot Christian Songs (Billboard)	12
Chart (2024)	Position
US Hot Christian Songs (Billboard)	1
US Christian Airplay (Billboard)	1
US Christian AC (Billboard)	1
Chart (2025)	Position
US Hot Christian Songs (Billboard)	3

== Certifications ==
Region	Certification	Certified units/sales
United States (RIAA)	2× Platinum	2,000,000^{‡}
^{‡} Sales+streaming figures based on certification alone.

== Release history ==
Release dates and formats for "Praise"
Region	Date	Format	Label	Ref.
United States	February 12, 2024	Christian radio	Elevation Worship Records	
Various	March 1, 2024	Digital download; streaming; (EP)	Elevation Worship Records	
