= House of Miracles (Brandon Lake album) =

2020 studio album by Brandon Lake

Studio album by Brandon Lake
- Released: August 28, 2020
- Recorded: 2020
- Genre: Contemporary worship music
- Length: 58:28
- Label: Bethel Music
- Producer: David Leonard; Jacob Sooter; Lael

Brandon Lake chronology
Closer (2016)	House of Miracles (2020)	House of Miracles (Live) (2021)

Singles from House of Miracles
- 1. "I Need a Ghost" Released: July 24, 2020; 2. "Just Like Heaven" Released: August 14, 2020; 3. "Gratitude" Released: June 3, 2022

House of Miracles is the second studio album by American contemporary worship musician Brandon Lake. Bethel Music released the album on August 28, 2020. The album contains guest appearances by Tasha Cobbs Leonard and Sarah Reeves. The album was produced by David Leonard, Jacob Sooter, and Lael.

The album was supported by the release of "I Need a Ghost", "Just Like Heaven" and "Gratitude" as singles. "I Need a Ghost" peaked at number 27 on the US Christian Airplay chart. "Just Like Heaven" peaked at number 36 on the US Hot Christian Songs chart. "Gratitude" peaked at number one on the Hot Christian Songs chart. The album peaked at number six on the US Top Christian Albums chart.

== Background ==
House of Miracles is Brandon Lake's debut solo project with Bethel Music, having joined the label in 2019. Lake stated that theme of the album was drawn from his divine calling that his family was embracing, saying:

A few years ago, God gave my wife and me a vision for our home to become a place to host couples and people in ministry who were burned out. I saw us worshipping with, affirming and praying for those who were hurting, and I felt that through our home God was calling us to set an atmosphere where miracles can happen in people’s lives.

In an interview with American Songwriter, Lake further explained that the heart behind the album was to remind the listener that experiencing the presence of God transcends the church setting, saying, “He also wants you to become a house of miracles, by the things that you say and the way that you live, you too can experience that.” Lake also noted the contrast of instrumentation of the lead single, "I Need a Ghost" with the other songs of the album, describing it as an to the dynamic aspects of a personal relationship with God which encompasses different emotions and conversations, and exploring the different facets of God.

== Release and promotion ==
=== Singles ===
On July 24, 2020, Lake released a new single titled "I Need a Ghost", as the lead single to his second studio album, House of Miracles, slated to be released in summer. "I Need a Ghost" peaked at number 27 on the Billboard Christian Airplay chart.

On August 14, 2020, Lake released "Just Like Heaven" as the second single from House of Miracles. "Just Like Heaven" peaked at number 36 on the Billboard Hot Christian Songs chart.

The radio version of "Gratitude" was released on June 3, 2022, making it the third single from the album. "Gratitude" peaked at number one on the Hot Christian Songs chart.

=== Promotional singles ===
"House of Miracles" was released on August 24, 2020, as the first promotional single from the album.

== Critical reception ==
Professional ratings
Review scores
Source	Rating
365 Days of Inspiring Media	4.5/5
JubileeCast	4/5
One Man In The Middle	4.85/5 stars

Jonathan Andre in his 365 Days of Inspiring Media review opined that House of Miracles is "one of the most vulnerable, honest, emotional and inspiring worship albums all year." Timothy Yap of JubileeCast praised the album, saying, "It's diverse enough that it has the ability to reach people of variegated musical tastes." Yap recommended the album to listeners who prefer "worship music that has sliver of ruggedness and rawness." Rob Allwright, reviewing for One Man In The Middle, said "I think this album is very much a testimony to Brandon's talents to pull this together and be able to write with a huge variety of people and to infuse the songs with a huge amount of passion and sensitivity as he delivers the lyrics."

== Commercial performance ==
In the United States, House of Miracles debuted at number 22 on the Billboard Top Christian Albums chart dated September 12, 2020.

== Track listing ==
House of Miracles
No.	Title	Writer(s)	Producer(s)	Length
1.	"I Need a Ghost"	Joshua Silverberg; Brandon Lake	David Leonard	3:39
2.	"Just Like Heaven"	Lake; Jacob Sooter; Jeff Schneeweis	Jacob Sooter	5:36
3.	"House of Miracles"	Sooter; Lake	Jacob Sooter	5:37
4.	"Running to the Light"	Benjamin Hastings; Lake; Dante Bowe	David Leonard	3:55
5.	"Temple"	Silverberg; Mitch Wong; Lake	David Leonard	3:23
6.	"Wildflowers"	Nate Smith; Pat Barrett; Elyssa Smith; Lake	David Leonard	3:25
7.	"Gratitude"	Hastings; Lake; Bowe	Jacob Sooter	5:37
8.	"Graves into Gardens"	Chris Brown; Steven Furtick; Lake; Tiffany Hammer	David Leonard	5:43
9.	"Rattle!" (featuring Tasha Cobbs Leonard)	Brown; Furtick; Lake	David Leonard	7:18
10.	"Wild for Me"	Jesse Reeves; Dustin Smith; Lake; Bowe; Jordan Colle; Garrett Abel	Lael	3:44
11.	"Son of Heaven"	Matt Maher; Lake; Bowe	Jacob Sooter	6:03
12.	"Lost in Your Love" (featuring Sarah Reeves)	Sarah Reeves; Lake	David Leonard	4:24
Total length:				58:28

- Songwriting credits adapted from PraiseCharts.

== Charts ==
=== Weekly charts ===
Weekly chart performance for House of Miracles
Chart (2020–2023)	Peak position
US Top Christian Albums (Billboard)	6

=== Year-end charts ===
Year-end chart performance for House of Miracles
Chart (2022)	Position
US Christian Albums (Billboard)	37
Chart (2023)	Position
US Christian Albums (Billboard)	13
Chart (2025)	Position
US Christian Albums (Billboard)	8

== Release history ==
Region	Date	Format	Label	Ref.
Various	August 28, 2020	CD; digital download; streaming	Bethel Music	
