= My Testimony =

2020 song by Elevation Worship

Promotional single by Elevation Worship

from the album Graves into Gardens
- Released: April 3, 2020
- Recorded: 2019
- Venue: Elevation Ballantyne, Charlotte, North Carolina, US
- Genre: Contemporary worship music
- Length: 4:51
- Label: Elevation Worship
- Songwriters: Chris Brown; Steven Furtick; Brandon Lake; Tiffany Hudson
- Producers: Chris Brown; Aaron Robertson

Music videos
- "My Testimony" (Acoustic) on YouTube
- "My Testimony" (Live) on YouTube
- "My Testimony" (Lyrics) on YouTube
- "My Testimony" (Morning & Evening) on YouTube

"My Testimony" (stylized in capital letters) is a song performed by American contemporary worship band Elevation Worship which was released as a promotional single from their eighth live album, Graves into Gardens (2020), on April 3, 2020. The song was written by Brandon Lake, Chris Brown, Steven Furtick and Tiffany Hudson. Chris Brown and Aaron Robertson handled the production of the single. "My Testimony" peaked at No. 24 on the US Hot Christian Songs chart despite not being an official single.

== Background ==
On April 3, 2020, Elevation Worship released "My Testimony" as the second promotional single in the lead-up to the release of its parent album, Graves into Gardens. "My Testimony" followed the release of two other songs from the album: "The Blessing" and "Graves into Gardens". Chris Brown of Elevation Worship spoke about song, saying: "This track is like a shot of faith adrenaline declaring all that God's done for us, along with all the miracles and blessings we've yet to see him do in our lives."

== Composition ==
"My Testimony" is composed in the key of B with a tempo of 97 beats per minute, and a musical time signature of 4/4.

== Commercial performance ==
"My Testimony" debuted at No. 25 on the US Hot Christian Songs chart dated April 18, 2020, concurrently charting at No. 9 on the Christian Digital Song Sales chart. Following the release of Graves into Gardens, the song reached at No. 24 on the Hot Christian Songs May 16-dated chart.

== Music videos ==
On April 15, 2020, Elevation Worship released the live performance video of "My Testimony" recorded at Elevation Church's Ballantyne campus on their YouTube channel, The acoustic performance video of the song was published on YouTube by Elevation Worship on April 13, 2020. The official lyric performance video of the song was published on YouTube by Elevation Worship on April 20, 2020. Elevation Worship availed a Spanish rendition of the song, titled "Mi Testimonio" on their YouTube channel on July 10, 2020. Elevation Worship released the music video for "My Testimony (Morning & Evening)" on YouTube on January 8, 2021.

== Charts ==
Weekly chart performance for "My Testimony"
Chart (2020–2021)	Peak position
US Hot Christian Songs (Billboard)	24
US Christian Airplay (Billboard)	49

== Release history ==
Region	Date	Format	Label	Ref.
Various	April 24, 2020	Digital download (promotional release); streaming (promotional release)	Elevation Worship Records	
