= Water Is Wild =

2022 song by Elevation Worship

Song by Elevation Worship featuring Chris Brown and Brandon Lake

from the album Lion
- Released: March 4, 2022
- Recorded: 2021
- Genre: Contemporary worship music
- Length: 7:44
- Label: Elevation Worship
- Songwriters: Chris Brown; Brandon Lake; Steven Furtick
- Producers: Chris Brown; Steven Furtick

Music video
- "Water Is Wild" on YouTube
- "Water Is Wild" (Lyrics) on YouTube

"Water Is Wild" is a song performed by American contemporary worship band Elevation Worship featuring Chris Brown and Brandon Lake. The song was released as the eighth track on Elevation Worship's tenth live album, Lion on March 4, 2022. The song was written by Brandon Lake, Chris Brown, and Steven Furtick.

"Water Is Wild" peaked at No. 44 on the US Hot Christian Songs chart.

== Background ==
In discussing the placement of tracks on the album, Chris Brown of Elevation Worship shared that "Water Is Wild" is "a rock song about the baptism of Jesus." It was also one of the songs recorded live at a night of worship at Elevation Worship in the aftermath of the COVID-19 pandemic.

== Composition ==
"Water Is Wild" is composed in the key of C with a tempo of 69 beats per minute, and a musical time signature of 4/4.

== Critical reception ==
In an Afrocritik review, John Augustina said "Water is Wild" is "an intense outburst about the potency of baptism in the life of church people." Jonathan Andre of 365 Days of Inspiring Media described the song in his review as "a rousing and declaratory worship anthem, speaks about the healing power of the Living Water of Jesus," noting however that comparable songs such as "Holy Water" by We the Kingdom, "The River" by Carman, "Let It Rain" by Michael W. Smith, and "River of Life" by Mac Powell would "deliver the concept of water in worship oh so infinitely better than this melody."

== Commercial performance ==
Following the release of the album, "Water Is Wild" made its debut at No. 44 on the US Hot Christian Songs chart dated March 19, 2022.

== Music videos ==
On March 4, 2022, Elevation Worship published the lyric video for the song on YouTube. On March 24, 2022, Elevation Worship released the official music video for "Lion" via YouTube. The video shows Chris Brown and Brandon Lake leading the song during an Elevation Church worship service.

== Charts ==
Chart performance for "Water Is Wild"
Chart (2022)	Peak position
US Hot Christian Songs (Billboard)	44
