= Lion (Elevation Worship song) =

2022 song by Elevation Worship

Song by Elevation Worship featuring Chris Brown and Brandon Lake

from the album Lion
- Released: March 4, 2022
- Recorded: 2021
- Genre: Contemporary worship music
- Length: 5:54
- Label: Elevation Worship
- Songwriters: Chris Brown; Brandon Lake; Steven Furtick
- Producers: Chris Brown; Steven Furtick

Music video
- "Lion" on YouTube
- "Lion" (Live from the Loft) on YouTube
- "Lion" (Lyrics) on YouTube

"Lion" (stylized in all-caps) is a song performed by American contemporary worship band Elevation Worship featuring Chris Brown and Brandon Lake. The song was released as the fourth track on the live album of the same name on March 4, 2022. The song was written by Brandon Lake, Chris Brown, and Steven Furtick.

"Lion" peaked at No. 16 on the US Hot Christian Songs chart. It has been certified gold by Recording Industry Association of America (RIAA).

== Background ==
Chris Brown of Elevation Worship shared the story behind the song, saying:

This was one of the easiest songs to produce with our band. It seemed to know exactly what to do with itself right away. Pastor Steven, Brandon Lake and myself wrote it on a Wednesday, banging as hard as we could on a keyboard and acoustic, so we called the band together the next day to flesh it out. And that single D note that drones throughout the song set the tone for where the song needed to go musically.

== Composition ==
"Lion" is composed in the key of D minor with a tempo of 67 beats per minute, and a musical time signature of 4/4.

== Critical reception ==
Timothy Yap, reviewing for JubileeCast, opined about the song: "The title cut "Lion," with its various depictions of Christ as presented in the book of Revelation, shows depth and maturity in the team's scribing skills." In an Afrocritik review, John Augustina said ""Lion" comprises high-octanes, and is beautifully crafted to encourage high praise followed by tranquil moments. Somehow, writing this, this track found its to way into my favourite playlist as I couldn’t help but listen over and over again. The vocal energy produced as they scream roar comes with a force that beckons even the hardest of souls." Jonathan Andre of 365 Days of Inspiring Media described the song in his review as "an anthemic, powerful melody." Gerod Bass of Worship Musician magazine wrote in his review: "The signature song on the album is the title track which begins with a piano ballad as Brandon Lake confidently-declares the majesty and power of our God as the lamb who roars for us with resurrection power."

== Commercial performance ==
Following the release of the album, "Lion" made its debut at No. 17 on the US Hot Christian Songs chart, concurrently charting at No. 2 on the Christian Digital Song Sales chart.

== Music videos ==
On March 4, 2022, Elevation Worship published the lyric video for the song on YouTube, later releasing the official music video for "Lion" that same day. The video shows Chris Brown and Brandon Lake leading the song during an Elevation Church worship service.

On August 19, 2022, Elevation Worship published an acoustic performance video of the song on YouTube. The video was recorded in the loft of a recently restored barn in Charlotte, North Carolina, showing Brown and Lake leading the song.

== Charts ==
=== Weekly charts ===
Weekly chart performance for "Lion"
Chart (2022)	Peak position
US Hot Christian Songs (Billboard)	16
US Christian Airplay (Billboard)	39

=== Year-end charts ===
Year-end chart performance for "Lion"
Chart (2022)	Position
US Christian Songs (Billboard)	38

== Certifications ==
Region	Certification	Certified units/sales
United States (RIAA)	Platinum	1,000,000^{‡}
^{‡} Sales+streaming figures based on certification alone.
