= Lion (Elevation Worship album) =

2022 live album by Elevation Worship

Live album by Elevation Worship
- Released: March 4, 2022
- Recorded: 2021
- Venue: Elevation Church Ballantyne, Charlotte, North Carolina, US
- Genre: Contemporary worship music
- Length: 102:41
- Label: Elevation Worship; Provident Label Group
- Producer: Chris Brown; Steven Furtick

Elevation Worship chronology
Old Church Basement (2021)	Lion (2022)	Can You Imagine? (2023)

Singles from Lion
- 1. "Might Get Loud" Released: August 20, 2021; 2. "Lion" Released: March 4, 2022; 3. "Same God" Released: June 17, 2022

Lion (stylized in all-caps) is the tenth live album by American contemporary worship band Elevation Worship. It was released on March 4, 2022, via Elevation Worship Records and Provident Label Group. The featured worship leaders on the album are Chris Brown, Jonsal Barrientes, Brandon Lake, Pat Barrett, Tiffany Hudson, Joe L. Barnes, and Chandler Moore.

Lion was supported by the release of "Might Get Loud", "Lion" and "Same God" as singles. "Might Get Loud" peaked at No. 20 on the US Hot Christian Songs chart. "Same God" peaked at No. 1 on the Hot Christian Songs chart. "Lion" peaked at No. 16 on the US Hot Christian Songs chart. It has been certified gold by Recording Industry Association of America (RIAA). "What I See" and "This Is the Kingdom" were released as promotional singles from the album. "What I See" peaked at No. 28 on the Hot Christian Songs chart. "This Is the Kingdom" peaked at No. 27 on the Hot Christian Songs chart. The album is also being promoted with the Elevation Nights 2022 Arena Tour and the Elevation Worship Summer Tour, spanning cities across the United States.

Lion became a commercially successful album upon its release, debuting at No. 2 on Billboard's Top Christian Albums chart in the United States, and at No. 3 on the Official Charts' Official Christian & Gospel Albums Chart in the United Kingdom. Lion received two GMA Dove Award nominations for Worship Album of the Year and Recorded Music Packaging of the Year at the 2022 GMA Dove Awards. The album received a nomination for the Grammy Award for Best Contemporary Christian Music Album at the 2023 Grammy Awards.

== Background ==
On January 21, 2022, Elevation Worship announced that they will release an album titled Lion, The album being slated for release on March 4, 2022. The album follows the release of the band's last solo release Graves into Gardens (2020), and the collaborative album Old Church Basement (2021) alongside Maverick City Music, both albums achieving commercial success and critical acclaim for the band. The album contains fifteen tracks and features Elevation Worship members Chris Brown, Jonsal Barrientes, and Tiffany Hudson, alongside guest appearances from Brandon Lake, Pat Barrett, Joe L Barnes, and Chandler Moore. Chris Brown shared the story behind the album, saying:

This project was written and recorded at different times over the last year and really covers a broad spectrum of moments captured in our church worship. Some of these songs really surprised us in the writing rooms, which led us to some very special moments in recording them - both in the studio and live in church. The process of making this album has been unlike any other we’ve had.

Speaking to American Songwriter, Brown shared that the songwriting process for Lion was marked by challenging their own pre-conceived notions of worship music should sound like in the 18 months leading up to the album's release.

== Artwork ==
Chris Brown of Elevation Worship shared that the decision process behind choosing the album cover was explorative, saying that as the album took shape and with inspiration from the title track, Steven Furtick suggested taking an unexpected direction the album cover, opting to put a lamb on the cover depicting "the encompassing and paradoxical nature of who God is." Brown expounded on the paradoxical nature of God, saying "So much of God’s kingdom embodies paradox. Jesus himself does: He was servant and master. He was sovereign and he submitted to authority. He’s the beginning and the end. He’s the Lion and the Lamb."

== Release and promotion ==
=== Singles ===
Elevation Worship released "Might Get Loud" featuring Chris Brown, Brandon Lake, and Tiffany Hudson, on August 20, 2021, as the lead single from the album, accompanied with its music video. The song peaked at No. 20 on the US Hot Christian Songs chart.

Following the release of the album on March 4, 2022, "Lion" made its debut at No. 17 on the US Hot Christian Songs chart, concurrently charting at No. 2 on the Christian Digital Song Sales chart. The song peaked at No. 16 on the US Hot Christian Songs chart. It has been certified gold by Recording Industry Association of America (RIAA).

The radio version of "Same God" was released on June 17, 2022, making it the second single from the album. The song peaked at No. 1 on the US Hot Christian Songs chart dated January 21, 2023, on the back of significant gains in radio airplay and streaming.

=== Promotional singles ===
On January 21, 2022, Elevation Worship launched the digital pre-order of the album, releasing "Same God" featuring Jonsal Barrientes as the first promotional single from the album, accompanied with its music video.

On February 4, 2022, Elevation Worship released "What I See" featuring Chris Brown as the second promotional single from the album, accompanied with its music video. "What I See" peaked at No. 28 on the US Hot Christian Songs chart.

On February 18, 2022, Elevation Worship released "This Is the Kingdom" featuring Pat Barrett as the third and final promotional single from the album. "This Is the Kingdom" peaked at No. 27 on the US Hot Christian Songs chart.

== Touring ==
On February 2, 2022, Premier Productions announced that Elevation Worship and Steven Furtick will be embarking on the Elevation Nights 2022 Arena Tour, performing in eight cities in the spring of 2022. The tour commenced at the Now Arena in Chicago, Illinois, on April 26, 2022, and concluded at the TD Garden in Boston, Massachusetts, on May 5, 2022.

On June 2, 2022, Premier Productions announced that Elevation Worship will be embarking on the Elevation Worship Summer Tour 2022. The group will be joined by Kari Jobe and Cody Carnes on tour. The tour will span 13 dates across arenas in the United States, commencing at the Texas Trust CU Theatre in Grand Prairie, Texas, on August 5, 2022, and concludes at the Radio City Music Hall in New York City on August 21, 2022.

== Reception ==
=== Critical response ===
Professional ratings
Review scores
Source	Rating
365 Days of Inspiring Media	2.5/5
JubileeCast	3.75/5

Timothy Yap, reviewing for JubileeCast, concluded in his review of the album: "As expected, it is difficult for such a mammoth album like Lion to hold our attention all the way through. But there are enough gems to serve the church and individuals in worship." In an Afrocritik review, John Augustina said "Each of the tracks come with a depth and unique taste that leaves people submerged in awe as they ponder on the love and commitment of God. The album is a sure conduit of God’s presence. Like dosages, these songs come highly recommended for church folks who are looking for uplifting songs to grease their spirits as they engage in their private devotions." Joshua Andre in his 365 Days of Inspiring Media review opined that "Sadly though, I found great parts of Lion lacking for me, in every aspect," citing a failure to connect with the songs and suggesting that the band "have come to a point where their past discography will probably sound infinitely better than anything they release in the future." Gerod Bass of Worship Musician magazine wrote a positive review of the album, saying "Lion is a deep expression of personal, honest and creative worship and every song writer who writes worship music should stop and take notice of what they have done, I applaud them for taking all kinds of risks for the sake of the Gospel with this album."

=== Accolades ===
Awards
Year	Organization	Award	Result	Ref
2022	GMA Dove Awards	Worship Album of the Year	Nominated	
2022	GMA Dove Awards	Recorded Music Packaging of the Year	Nominated	
2023	Grammy Awards	Best Contemporary Christian Music Album	Nominated	

== Commercial performance ==
In the United States, Lion debuted at No. 2 on the Top Christian Albums chart in the United States dated March 19, 2022. The album concurrently registered on the mainstream Billboard 200 chart at No. 80. In the United Kingdom, Lion debuted on the OCC's Official Christian & Gospel Albums Chart at No. 3. The album also charted on the Swiss Hitparade at No. 83.

== Track listing ==
Lion
No.	Title	Writer(s)	Length
1.	"Bye Bye Babylon" (featuring Valley Boys)	Steven Furtick; Chris Brown; Brandon Lake; Pat Barrett	4:22
2.	"What I See" (featuring Chris Brown)	Brown; Furtick; Jason Ingram; Pat Barrett	4:36
3.	"Same God" (featuring Jonsal Barrientes)	Furtick; Brown; Lake; Barrett	8:01
4.	"Lion" (featuring Chris Brown and Brandon Lake)	Brown; Lake; Furtick	5:54
5.	"This Is the Kingdom" (featuring Pat Barrett)	Barrett; Furtick; Brown; Ingram	9:58
6.	"This Is the Kingdom (Flow)" (featuring Pat Barrett)	Barrett; Furtick; Brown; Ingram	4:36
7.	"Dancing" (featuring Joe L Barnes and Tiffany Hudson)	Joe L Barnes; Tiffany Hudson; Furtick; Maryanne Joshua George	5:04
8.	"Water Is Wild" (featuring Chris Brown and Brandon Lake)	Brown; Lake; Furtick	7:44
9.	"Welcome Resurrection" (featuring Chris Brown)	Furtick; Cody Carnes	7:56
10.	"Forever YHWH" (featuring Tiffany Hudson)	Furtick; Brown; Lake; Barrett	8:19
11.	"No One" (featuring Chandler Moore & Tiffany Hudson)	Chandler Moore; Furtick; Brown; Ingram; Chris Tomlin	10:19
12.	"You Really Are" (featuring Chandler Moore & Tiffany Hudson)	Furtick	8:43
13.	"Why" (featuring Valley Boys)	Furtick; Brown; Lake	4:33
14.	"The One You Love" (featuring Chandler Moore)	Furtick; Brown; Ingram; Phil Wickham	7:57
15.	"Might Get Loud" (featuring Chris Brown, Brandon Lake, and Tiffany Hudson)	Brown; Lake; Furtick	4:39
Total length:			102:41

== Charts ==
=== Weekly charts ===
Weekly chart performance for Lion
Chart (2022)	Peak position
Swiss Albums (Schweizer Hitparade)	83
UK Album Downloads (OCC)	21
UK Christian & Gospel Albums (OCC)	3
US Billboard 200	80
US Christian Albums (Billboard)	2

=== Year-end charts ===
Year-end chart performance for Lion
Chart (2022)	Position
US Christian Albums (Billboard)	11
Chart (2023)	Position
US Christian Albums (Billboard)	9
Chart (2025)	Position
US Top Christian Albums (Billboard)	25

== Release history ==
Release history and formats for Lion
Region	Date	Format(s)	Label(s)	Ref.
Various	March 4, 2022	Digital download; streaming	Elevation Worship	
Various	March 18, 2022	CD	Provident Label Group	
