= Trust in God (song) =

2023 song by Elevation Worship

- Radio version cover

Single by Elevation Worship featuring Chris Brown

from the album Can You Imagine?
- Released: April 28, 2023
- Venue: Elevation Ballantyne, Charlotte, North Carolina, US
- Genre: Contemporary worship music
- Length: 7:22 (live version); 4:03 (radio version)
- Label: Elevation Worship
- Songwriters: Chris Brown; Steven Furtick; Brandon Lake; Mitch Wong
- Producers: Chris Brown; Steven Furtick

Elevation Worship singles chronology
"More Than Able" (2023)	"Trust in God" (2023)	"Another One" (2024)

Chris Brown singles chronology
"Might Get Loud" (2021)	"Trust in God" (2023)	"In the Room" (2023)

Music video
- "Trust in God" on YouTube
- "Trust in God" (Live from the Sanctuary) on YouTube
- "Trust in God" (Lyrics) on YouTube
- "Trust in God" (Radio Version/Lyrics) on YouTube
- "Trust in God" (Stairwell Sessions) on YouTube

"Trust in God" is a song performed by American contemporary worship band Elevation Worship featuring Chris Brown. On April 28, 2023, it impacted Christian radio stations in the United States as the second single from their eleventh live album, Can You Imagine? (2023). The song was written by Brandon Lake, Chris Brown, Mitch Wong, and Steven Furtick. The song interpolates the lyrics of the hymn "Blessed Assurance."

"Trust in God" peaked at No. 2 on the US Hot Christian Songs chart.

== Background ==
On April 4, 2023, radio promoters 55 Promotion announced that the song would be serviced to Christian radio in the United States, the official add date for the single slated on April 28, 2023. On April 28, 2023, Elevation Worship announced that the album Can You Imagine? would be released on May 19, 2023, and released "Trust in God" as the second single from the album accompanied with its music video. The song followed the release of the album's lead single, "More Than Able" in March 2023.

Elevation Worship released the radio version of "Trust in God" on July 28, 2023.

== Composition ==
"Trust in God" is composed in the key of A with a tempo of 74 beats per minute, and a musical time signature of 4/4.

== Reception ==
=== Critical response ===
Writing for Air1, Katie Clinebell said: "With "Trust in God," Elevation Worship shows us that God strengthens our relationships with Him by allowing us to go through struggles, and consistently saving us from them before they become too much for us to handle. He has never failed us, even when we did not see Him working." Timothy Yap of JubileeCast opined "Chris Brown who gets to lead 3 out of the 8 tracks is particularly affective on "Trust in God." With the verses taking cues from the hymn "Blessed Assurance," the hymn is re-written with a contemporary gospel-sensitivity made even more dynamic with the input of a choir." In a Worship Leader magazine review of Can You Imagine?, Christopher Watson "The song "Trust in God" is the standout track on this album. Hands down, it's no contest."

=== Accolades ===
Awards
Year	Organization	Award	Result	Ref
2024	ASCAP Christian Music Awards	Most Performed ASCAP Christian Songs of 2023	Won	
2024	GMA Dove Awards	Song of the Year	Nominated	
2024	GMA Dove Awards	Worship Recorded Song of the Year	Nominated	

== Commercial performance ==
"Trust in God" debuted at No. 16 on the US Hot Christian Songs chart dated February 5, 2022, concurrently charting at No. 35 on the Christian Airplay chart, and No. 4 on the Christian Digital Song Sales chart.

== Music videos ==
Elevation Worship released the music video for "Trust in God" featuring Chris Brown and Isaiah Templeton leading the song during an Elevation Church worship service, via YouTube on April 28, 2023. The official lyric video for the song was issued by Elevation Worship through YouTube on May 3, 2023. On May 10, 2023, Elevation Worship published the "Trust in God (Live from the Sanctuary)" performance video on YouTube. On October 16, 2023, Elevation Worship uploaded the "Trust in God (Stairwell Sessions)" performance video featuring Elevation Choir on YouTube. On July 28, 2023, Elevation Worship published the official lyric video for the radio version of the song on YouTube.

== Performances ==
Elevation Worship performed "Trust in God" live on the Fox & Friends All-American Summer Concert Series broadcast on July 14, 2023.

== Track listing ==
"Trust in God" / "More Than Able"
No.	Title	Writer(s)	Producer(s)	Length
1.	"Trust in God" (featuring Chris Brown)	Chris Brown; Steven Furtick; Brandon Lake; Mitch Wong	Chris Brown; Steven Furtick	7:22
2.	"More Than Able" (featuring Chandler Moore and Tiffany Hudson)	Ben Fielding; Furtick; Chandler Moore; Naomi Raine	Chris Brown; Steven Furtick; Chandler Moore	9:58
Total length:				17:20

"Trust in God" (Radio Version)
No.	Title	Producer(s)	Length
1.	"Trust in God" (Radio Version)	Chris Brown	4:03

== Charts ==
=== Weekly charts ===
Weekly chart performance for "Trust in God"
Chart (2023–2024)	Peak position
US Hot Christian Songs (Billboard)	2
US Christian Airplay (Billboard)	6
US Christian AC (Billboard)	10

=== Year-end charts ===
Year-end chart performance for "Trust in God"
Chart (2023)	Position
US Christian Songs (Billboard)	18
US Christian Airplay (Billboard)	41
US Christian AC (Billboard)	37
Chart (2025)	Position
US Christian Digital Song Sales (Billboard)	19
US Christian Streaming Songs (Billboard)	7

== Certifications ==
Region	Certification	Certified units/sales
New Zealand (RMNZ)	Gold	15,000^{‡}
United States (RIAA)	2× Platinum	2,000,000^{‡}
^{‡} Sales+streaming figures based on certification alone.

== Release history ==
Release dates and formats for "Trust in God"
Region	Date	Version	Format	Label	Ref.
Various	April 28, 2023	Live	Digital download; streaming; (promotional release)	Elevation Worship Records	
United States	April 28, 2023	Radio	Christian radio	Elevation Worship Records	
Various	July 28, 2023	Radio	Digital download; streaming	Elevation Worship Records	
