= Worthy of My Song (Worthy of It All) =

2022 single

Single by Maverick City Music, Phil Wickham and Chandler Moore featuring Mav City Gospel Choir

from the album The Maverick Way Complete
- Released: April 8, 2022
- Recorded: October 28, 2021
- Venue: Barclays Center, Brooklyn, New York
- Genre: Contemporary worship music
- Length: 8:26
- Label: Tribl
- Songwriters: David Brymer; Phil Wickham; Ryan Hall; Steven Furtick
- Producers: Jonathan Jay; Tony Brown; Harold Brown

Maverick City Music singles chronology
"Jireh" (2022)	"Worthy of My Song (Worthy of It All)" (2022)	"God Really Loves Us" (2022)

Phil Wickham singles chronology
"Hymn of Heaven" (2022)	"Worthy of My Song (Worthy of It All)" (2022)	"Behold" (2022)

Chandler Moore singles chronology
"Jireh" (2022)	"Worthy of My Song (Worthy of It All)" (2022)	"Dependable" (2022)

Music video
- "Worthy of My Song (Worthy of It All)" on YouTube

"Worthy of My Song (Worthy of It All)" is a song performed by American contemporary worship collective Maverick City Music and American singers Phil Wickham and Chandler Moore featuring Mav City Gospel Choir. It was released as the second single for later released album The Maverick Way Complete on April 8, 2022. Phil Wickham released a solo studio-recorded version of the song on April 22, 2022. The song was written by Phil Wickham and Steven Furtick, with David Brymer and Ryan Hall being credited as songwriters on account of the sampling of the song "Worthy of It All."

"Worthy of My Song (Worthy of It All)" debuted at number 27 on the US Hot Christian Songs chart, and at number 11 on the Hot Gospel Songs chart.

== Composition ==
"Worthy of My Song (Worthy of It All)" is composed in the key of D with a tempo of 70 beats per minute and a musical time signature of 4/4.

== Commercial performance ==
"Worthy of My Song (Worthy of It All)" debuted at number 27 on the US Hot Christian Songs chart, and number 11 on the Hot Gospel Songs chart dated April 23, 2022.

== Music video ==
On April 8, 2022, Tribl released the music video of "Worthy of My Song (Worthy of It All)" by Maverick City Music featuring Phil Wickham and Chandler Moore and Mav City Gospel Choir, filmed at Barclays Center in Brooklyn, New York.

== Track listing ==
"Worthy of My Song (Worthy of It All)"
No.	Title	Writer(s)	Length
1.	"Worthy of My Song (Worthy of It All)" (featuring Mav City Gospel Choir)	David Brymer; Phil Wickham; Ryan Hall; Steven Furtick	8:26

"Worthy of My Song (Worthy of It All)" – Apple Music exclusive
No.	Title	Length
2.	"Worthy of My Song (Worthy of It All)" (music video)	8:27
Total length:		16:53

"Worthy of My Song" — Phil Wickham solo
No.	Title	Length
1.	"Worthy of My Song"	6:11

== Charts ==
Chart performance for "Worthy of My Song (Worthy of It All)"
Chart (2022)	Peak position
US Hot Christian Songs (Billboard)	27
US Gospel Songs (Billboard)	11

== Release history ==
Release dates and formats for "Worthy of My Song (Worthy of It All)"
Region	Date	Version	Format	Label	Ref.
Various	April 8, 2022	Live	Digital download; streaming	Tribl Records	
Various	April 22, 2022	Studio; Phil Wickham solo	Digital download; streaming	Fair Trade Services	
