= What I See =

2022 song by Elevation Worship

Promotional single by Elevation Worship featuring Chris Brown

from the album Lion
- Released: February 4, 2022
- Recorded: 2021
- Genre: Contemporary worship music
- Length: 4:36
- Label: Elevation Worship
- Songwriters: Chris Brown; Jason Ingram; Pat Barrett; Steven Furtick
- Producers: Chris Brown; Steven Furtick

Music videos
- "What I See" on YouTube
- "What I See" (Lyrics) on YouTube

"What I See" is a song performed by American contemporary worship band Elevation Worship featuring Chris Brown, which was released as a promotional single from their tenth live album, Lion (2022), on February 4, 2022. The song was written by Chris Brown, Jason Ingram, Pat Barrett, and Steven Furtick.

"What I See" peaked at No. 28 on the US Hot Christian Songs chart despite not being an official single.

== Background ==
On February 4, 2022, Elevation Worship released "What I See" featuring Chris Brown as the second promotional single in the lead-up to the release of its parent album, Lion (2022), following the release of "Same God." Chris Brown of Elevation Worship spoke about song, saying: "The song is a heart-pounding wake-up call that all things are possible with God and resurrection is still happening today!"

== Composition ==
"What I See" is composed in the key of C with a tempo of 148 beats per minute, and a musical time signature of 4/4.

== Commercial performance ==
"What I See" debuted at number 35 on the US Hot Christian Songs chart dated February 5, 2022, concurrently charting at number 22 on the Christian Digital Song Sales chart.

== Music videos ==
Elevation Worship released the music video for "What I See" featuring Chris Brown leading the song during an Elevation Church worship service, via YouTube on February 4, 2022. The official lyric video for the song was issued by Elevation Worship through YouTube on March 4, 2022.

== Charts ==
=== Weekly charts ===
Chart performance for "What I See"
Chart (2022)	Peak position
US Hot Christian Songs (Billboard)	28

=== Year-end charts ===
Year-end chart performance for "What I See"
Chart (2022)	Position
US Christian Songs (Billboard)	91

== Release history ==
Release history and formats for "What I See"
Region	Date	Format	Label	Ref.
Various	February 4, 2022	Digital download; streaming; (promotional release)	Elevation Worship Records	
