= Can You Imagine? =

2023 live album by Elevation Worship

Live album by Elevation Worship
- Released: May 19, 2023
- Recorded: January 13, 2023
- Venues: Elevation Church Ballantyne, Charlotte, North Carolina, U.S.
- Genre: Contemporary worship music
- Length: 56:55
- Labels: Elevation Worship Records; Provident Label Group
- Producers: Chris Brown; Steven Furtick; Scott Gardner Jr.

Elevation Worship chronology
LION (2022)	Can You Imagine? (2023)	Echo the Angels (2023)

Singles from Can You Imagine?
- 1. "More Than Able" Released: March 24, 2023; 2. "Trust in God" Released: April 28, 2023; 3. "Praise" Released: February 12, 2024

Can You Imagine? (stylized in all caps) is the eleventh live album by American contemporary worship band Elevation Worship. It was released on May 19, 2023, via Elevation Worship Records and Provident Label Group. The featured worship leaders on the album are Chris Brown, Jonsal Barrientes, Brandon Lake, Tiffany Hudson, and Chandler Moore.

Can You Imagine? is supported by the release of "More Than Able," "Trust in God," and "Praise" as singles. "More Than Able" peaked at number seven on the US Hot Christian Songs chart. "Trust in God" peaked at No. 2 on the Hot Christian Songs chart. "Praise" reached number one on the Hot Christian Songs chart. To promote the album, the group embarked on the Elevation Nights 2023 Arena Tour, with legs taking place in the summer and fall.

== Background ==
On March 27, 2023, Elevation Worship announced that they would release an album titled Can You Imagine? on May 19, 2023. The album follows the release of LION (2022), which achieved commercial success and received a Grammy nomination for Best Contemporary Christian Music Album. Can You Imagine? contains eight tracks and features Elevation Worship members Chris Brown, Jonsal Barrientes, and Tiffany Hudson, alongside guest appearances from Brandon Lake, and Chandler Moore.

== Release and promotion ==
=== Singles ===
Elevation Worship released "More Than Able" featuring Chandler Moore and Tiffany Hudson, on March 24, 2023, as the lead single from the album, accompanied with its music video. The track peaked at number seven on Billboard Hot Christian Songs.

On April 28, 2023, "Trust in God" was released as the second from the album, accompanied with its music video. The track peaked at number two on the Hot Christian Songs chart.

On February 12, 2024, "Praise" impacted Christian radio stations in the United States as the third single from the album. The track reached number one on the Hot Christian Songs chart.

== Reception ==
=== Critical response ===
Professional ratings
Review scores
Source	Rating
JubileeCast	4/5

Timothy Yap, reviewing for JubileeCast, gave the project four out of five stars, concluding: "Can You Imagine? doesn't really stretch your imagination as far as worship music is concerned. But in the midst of it all, there are still some gems." In a NewReleaseToday review, Jasmin Patterson wrote a positive review of the album, saying "This collection of songs magnifies Jesus as the God who is intimately, personally, and powerfully involved in every detail of our lives. Can You Imagine? will give you language to express your worship to God for His greatness and your trust in Him to work in your life."

=== Accolades ===
Awards and nominations
Year	Organization	Award	Result	Ref
2024	GMA Dove Awards	Worship Album of the Year	Nominated	
2024	GMA Dove Awards	Long Form Music Video of the Year	Nominated	

Year-end lists
Publication	Accolade	Rank	Ref.
Louder Than The Music	LTTM Album Awards 2023	5	

== Commercial performance ==
In the United States, Can You Imagine? debuted at No. 1 on the Top Christian Albums chart dated June 3, 2023. The album concurrently registered on the mainstream Billboard 200 chart at No. 197.

== Track listing ==
Can You Imagine?
No.	Title	Writer(s)	Length
1.	"Jehovah" (featuring Chris Brown)	Chris Brown; Steven Furtick; Brandon Lake; Mitch Wong	5:54
2.	"More Than Able" (featuring Chandler Moore and Tiffany Hudson)	Furtick; Moore; Ben Fielding; Naomi Raine	9:58
3.	"Trust in God" (featuring Chris Brown)	Brown; Furtick; Lake; Wong	7:22
4.	"No Body" (featuring Jonsal Barrientes)	Furtick; Jason Ingram; Pat Barrett; Brett Younker	6:01
5.	"Make A Way" (featuring Brandon Lake and Chandler Moore)	Furtick; Moore; Lake; Barrett; Cody Carnes	8:32
6.	"Been So Good" (featuring Tiffany Hudson)	Furtick; Moore; Lake	7:44
7.	"Runnin'" (featuring Brandon Lake)	Furtick; Lake; Barrett	6:16
8.	"Praise" (featuring Brandon Lake, Chandler Moore and Chris Brown)	Brown; Furtick; Moore; Lake; Barrett; Carnes	5:04
Total length:			56:55

== Charts ==
=== Weekly charts ===
Weekly chart performance for Can You Imagine?
Chart (2023)	Peak position
UK Album Downloads (Official Charts)	66
UK Christian & Gospel Albums (OCC)	5
US Billboard 200	197
US Top Christian Albums (Billboard)	1

=== Year-end charts ===
Year-end chart performance for Can You Imagine?
Chart (2023)	Position
US Top Christian Albums (Billboard)	24
Chart (2025)	Position
US Top Christian Albums (Billboard)	3

== Certifications ==
Region	Certification	Certified units/sales
New Zealand (RMNZ)	Gold	7,500^{‡}
^{‡} Sales+streaming figures based on certification alone.
