= Just like Heaven =

Just like Heaven may refer to:

== Book ==
- Just like Heaven, a 2011 romance novel by Julia Quinn

== Film and television ==
- Just like Heaven (1930 film), a drama starring Anita Louise and David Newell
- Just like Heaven (2005 film), a romantic comedy starring Reese Witherspoon and Mark Ruffalo
- "Just Like Heaven", an episode of Reginald the Vampire

== Music ==
- "Just like Heaven" (The Cure song), 1987
- "Just like Heaven" (Brandon Lake song), 2020
