= Might Get Loud =

2021 song by Elevation Worship

Single by Elevation Worship featuring Chris Brown, Brandon Lake and Tiffany Hudson

from the album Lion
- Released: August 20, 2021
- Venue: Elevation Ballantyne, Charlotte, North Carolina, US
- Genre: Contemporary worship music
- Length: 4:39
- Label: Elevation Worship
- Songwriters: Chris Brown; Brandon Lake; Steven Furtick
- Producers: Chris Brown; Steven Furtick

Elevation Worship singles chronology
"Rattle!" (2021)	"Might Get Loud" (2021)	"Jireh" (2022)

Brandon Lake singles chronology
"I See You" (2021)	"Might Get Loud" (2021)	"Bless His Name (I've Got That Joy)" (2021)

Music video
- "Might Get Loud" on YouTube

"Might Get Loud" is a song performed by American contemporary worship band Elevation Worship featuring Chris Brown, Brandon Lake and Tiffany Hudson. The song was released as a single on August 20, 2021, as the lead single from Elevation Worship's tenth live album, Lion (2022). The song was written by Brandon Lake, Chris Brown, and Steven Furtick. Chris Brown and Steven Furtick handled the production of the single.

== Background ==
Elevation Worship released "Might Get Loud" as a single on August 20, 2021, with Chris Brown, Brandon Lake, and Tiffany Hudson leading the song. The single marks the first release since Elevation Worship and Maverick City Music's collaborative album, Old Church Basement (2021). It also marks Lake's fifth appearance for Elevation Worship, having performed on the hit single "Graves into Gardens" and multiple songs on Old Church Basement.

== Composition ==
"Might Get Loud" is composed in the key of A minor with a tempo of 137 beats per minute, and a musical time signature of 4/4.

== Commercial performance ==
"Might Get Loud" debuted at No. 20 on the US Hot Christian Songs chart dated September 4, 2021, concurrently charting at No. 4 on the Christian Digital Song Sales chart.

== Music video ==
The live music video of "Might Get Loud" was published on YouTube by Elevation Worship on August 20, 2021.

== Track listing ==
"Might Get Loud"
No.	Title	Length
1.	"Might Get Loud" (featuring Chris Brown, Brandon Lake, & Tiffany Hudson)	4:39

"Might Get Loud" — Apple Music bonus content exclusive
No.	Title	Length
2.	"Might Get Loud" (Music video)	4:39
Total length:		9:18

== Charts ==
Weekly chart performance for "Might Get Loud"
Chart (2021)	Peak position
US Hot Christian Songs (Billboard)	20

== Release history ==
Region	Date	Format	Label	Ref.
Various	August 20, 2021	Digital download; streaming	Elevation Worship Records	
