= Rattle! =

2020 song by Elevation Worship

Single by Elevation Worship

from the album Graves into Gardens
- Released: April 23, 2021
- Recorded: 2020
- Venue: Elevation Ballantyne, Charlotte, North Carolina, US
- Genre: Contemporary worship music
- Length: 7:12
- Label: Elevation Worship
- Songwriters: Chris Brown; Steven Furtick; Brandon Lake
- Producers: Chris Brown; Aaron Robertson

Elevation Worship singles chronology
"Vida aos Sepulcros" (2020)	"Rattle!" (2021)	"Might Get Loud" (2021)

Music videos
- "Rattle!" (Acoustic) on YouTube
- "Rattle!" (Lyrics) on YouTube
- "Rattle!" (Morning & Evening) on YouTube

"Rattle!" (stylized in capital letters) is a song performed by American contemporary worship band Elevation Worship. On April 23, 2021, it was released as the third single from their eighth live album, Graves into Gardens (2020), to Christian radio stations in the United States. The song was written by Brandon Lake, Chris Brown, and Steven Furtick. Chris Brown and Aaron Robertson handled the production of the single.

"Rattle!" peaked at No. 4 on the US Hot Christian Songs chart, and No. 25 on the Bubbling Under Hot 100 chart. At the 2022 GMA Dove Awards, "Rattle!" was nominated for the GMA Dove Award for Song of the Year.

== Background ==
"Rattle!" was initially released by Elevation Worship as a lyric video on YouTube on April 15, 2020. The song was officially released as the third promotional single of Graves into Gardens on April 24, after amassing on YouTube over 1.2 million views.

On July 10, 2020, Elevation Worship released a Spanish-language remake of the album Graves into Gardens, titled Tumbas a Jardines, which has a Spanish rendition of "Rattle!" titled "Ruido!". On January 8, 2021, Elevation Worship released the album, Graves into Gardens: Morning & Evening which included a new rendition of the song, "Rattle! (Morning & Evening)". The song impacted Christian radio stations on April 23, 2021.

== Writing and development ==
In an interview with Billboard, Chris Brown shared the story behind the song, saying:

It was written during quarantine, primarily over voice memos and Zoom calls back and forth. There just became a significant energy around the song really quickly. It felt like we had all been in quarantine and we're pent-up, on a roller coaster of emotions. It's like, the news is on and we're up and down with good news, bad news, fear and anxiety. So, yes, this song just came out as a release of emotion and a call to arms. I just wanted to say like, 'Hey, it's gonna be okay.' My faith in God says there's a better day ahead. All of us are kind of burying different expectations right now. We're having funerals and…not being able to walk across the graduation stage or not getting to go to prom and then more serious issues that people are dealing with. So "Rattle!" is a giant release and response to everything that we've experienced. We felt like it just had to open the album.

== Composition ==
"Rattle!" is composed in the key of E♭ with a tempo of 76 beats per minute, and a musical time signature of 4/4.

== Accolades ==
Awards
Year	Organization	Award	Result	Ref
2022	GMA Dove Awards	Song of the Year	Nominated	

== Commercial performance ==
"Rattle!" debuted at number seventeen on the US Hot Christian Songs chart dated May 9, 2020, concurrently charting at No. 1 on the Christian Digital Song Sales chart. Following the release of Graves into Gardens, the song reached at number sixteen on the Hot Christian Songs May 16-dated chart. The song spent a total of twenty one weeks appearing on the chart.

"Rattle!" returned to Hot Christian Songs chart dated on June 12, 2021, at number sixteen.

"Rattle!" rose to No. 1 on the Christian Airplay chart dated September 18, 2021.

== Music videos ==
On April 15, 2020, Elevation Worship released the lyric video of "Rattle!" recorded at Elevation Church's Ballantyne campus on their YouTube channel, The acoustic performance video of the song was published on YouTube by Elevation Worship on June 22, 2020. Elevation Worship availed a Spanish rendition of the song, titled "Ruido!" on their YouTube channel on July 10, 2020. Elevation Worship released the music video for "Rattle! (Morning & Evening)" on YouTube on January 8, 2021.

== Charts ==
=== Weekly charts ===
Weekly chart performance for "Rattle!"
Chart (2020–2021)	Peak position
US Bubbling Under Hot 100 (Billboard)	25
US Hot Christian Songs (Billboard)	4
US Christian Airplay (Billboard)	1
US Christian AC (Billboard)	2
US Digital Song Sales (Billboard)	30

Weekly chart performance for "Rattle! (Morning & Evening)"
Chart (2021)	Peak position
US Hot Christian Songs (Billboard)	39

=== Year-end charts ===
Year-end chart performance for "Rattle!"
Chart (2020)	Position
US Christian Songs (Billboard)	64
Chart (2021)	Position
US Christian Songs (Billboard)	16
US Christian Airplay (Billboard)	6
US Christian AC (Billboard)	4

== Certifications ==
Region	Certification	Certified units/sales
United States (RIAA)	Gold	500,000^{‡}
^{‡} Sales+streaming figures based on certification alone.

== Release history ==
Region	Date	Format	Label	Ref.
Various	April 24, 2020	Digital download (promotional release); streaming (promotional release)	Elevation Worship Records	
United States	April 23, 2021	Christian radio	Elevation Worship Records	

== Zach Williams, Essential Worship version ==
"Rattle!"

Single by Zach Williams and Essential Worship featuring Steven Furtick
- Released: November 13, 2020
- Recorded: 2020
- Genre: Contemporary worship music
- Length: 6:15
- Label: Provident Label Group
- Producer: Jonathan Smith

Zach Williams singles chronology
"Go Tell It on the Mountain" (2020)	"Rattle!" (2020)	"Less Like Me" (2021)

Essential Worship singles chronology
"The Song Sessions" (2020)	"Rattle!" (2020)	"Goodness of God" (2021)

Music video
- "Rattle!" (Lyrics) on YouTube

On November 13, 2020, Zach Williams and Essential Worship released a cover of the song featuring the vocals of Steven Furtick, as a standalone single.

=== Background ===
Zach Williams shared the story behind the recording this version of the song, saying:

'Impossible' and 'disappointment' are two words that have plagued our culture in this season. I want these words to be replaced with 'power' and 'miracles.' As a musician with a platform, I want 'My God is able' to rattle the minds of the listeners. The first time I heard this song, the raw power and emotion of this song impacted me greatly, and I want this song to be a reminder to all that God is able and he is doing great things.

=== Composition ===
Zach Williams' and Essential Worship's version of the song is composed in the key of D♭ with a moderate tempo of 76 beats per minute and a musical time signature of 4/4.

=== Commercial performance ===
Zach Williams' and Essential Worship's rendition of the song made its debut at number 50 on Billboard's Hot Christian Songs chart dated January 16, 2021.

=== Music video ===
On November 12, 2020, Essential Worship published the lyric video of the song on YouTube.

=== Charts ===
Chart (2021)	Peak position
US Hot Christian Songs (Billboard)	46

=== Release history ===
Region	Date	Format	Label	Ref.
Various	November 13, 2020	Digital download; streaming	Provident Label Group	

== Other versions ==
- Brandon Lake released his own rendition of "Rattle!" featuring Tasha Cobbs Leonard on his second studio album, House of Miracles (2020).
