= Jireh (song) =

2021 song by Elevation Worship and Maverick City Music

Single by Elevation Worship and Maverick City Music featuring Chandler Moore and Naomi Raine

from the album Old Church Basement
- Released: April 1, 2021
- Recorded: 2021
- Genre: Contemporary worship music
- Length: 9:59
- Label: Elevation Worship
- Songwriters: Chandler Moore; Steven Furtick; Chris Brown; Naomi Raine
- Producers: Chris Brown; Steven Furtick; Jason Ingram; Tony Brown; Jonathan Jay

Elevation Worship singles chronology
| "Might Get Loud" (2021) | "Jireh" (2021) | "Same God" (2022) |

Maverick City Music singles chronology
| "Firm Foundation (He Won't)" (2022) | "Jireh" (2021) | "Worthy of My Song (Worthy of It All)" (2022) |

Chandler Moore singles chronology
| "Firm Foundation (He Won't)" (2022) | "Jireh" (2021) | "Worthy of My Song (Worthy of It All)" (2022) |

Naomi Raine singles chronology
| "One Name" (2023) | "Jireh" (2021) |

Music videos
- "Jireh" on YouTube
- "Jireh" (Lyrics) on YouTube

Audio sample
- "Jireh": file; help

"Jireh" is a song performed by American contemporary worship bands Elevation Worship and Maverick City Music featuring the latter's Chandler Moore and Naomi Raine. It impacted Christian radio in the United States on April 1, 2021, as the lead single from their collaborative live album, Old Church Basement (2021). The song was initially released as a promotional single on March 26, 2021. The song was written by Moore, Raine, Chris Brown, and Steven Furtick.

"Jireh" peaked at No. 8 on the US Hot Christian Songs chart, and at No. 1 on the Hot Gospel Songs chart. It has been certified two-times platinum by Recording Industry Association of America (RIAA). The song was ranked by Billboard as the fourth biggest gospel song in 2022. "Jireh" was nominated for the GMA Dove Award Worship Recorded Song of the Year at the 2021 GMA Dove Awards. It was also nominated for the Grammy Award for Best Contemporary Christian Music Performance/Song at the 2022 Grammy Awards, and the Billboard Music Award for Top Gospel Song at the 2022 Billboard Music Awards. The song received two GMA Dove Award nominations for Song of the Year and Worship Recorded Song of the Year at the 2022 GMA Dove Awards.

== Background ==
On March 26, 2021, Elevation Worship and Maverick City Music announced that they were releasing "Jireh" featuring Chandler Moore and Naomi Raine, along with its accompanying music video, as the first promotional single from their collaborative live album, Old Church Basement. The album is slated to be released on April 30, 2021.

On June 13, 2025, a lo-fi remix was released in collaboration with musician Xander.

== Writing and development ==
Chris Brown of Elevation Worship said that "Jireh" was the first song that he, Steven Furtick, Chandler Moore and Naomi Raine had written together and that it's the song that kickstarted the idea for Old Church Basement. "Jireh" was written in the first songwriting sessions for Elevation Worship and Maverick City Music. Naomi Raine also shared the story about the writing session for the song, saying:

We were sitting in the room and Pastor Steven says, ‘I have been thinking about this line that I will never be more loved than I am right now. Honestly, this song flowed out. We were in that room for about 10-12 hours, so, for me, this writing session is actually one of the defining writing moments of my life because more than it was a tool of ministry for someone else, I was singing that to myself and I think this song, as I believe it will change people’s lives, it has changed mine.

== Composition ==
"Jireh" is composed in the key of E♭ major with a tempo of 70 beats per minute, and a musical time signature of 4/4.

== Reception ==
=== Critical response ===
"Jireh" received critical acclaim, being described as "highly anticipated" and a "famous song." A special performance featuring Justin Bieber has been described as having the ability to “take you to church.”

=== Accolades ===
Awards
| Year | Organization | Award | Result | Ref |
|---|---|---|---|---|
| 2021 | GMA Dove Awards | Worship Recorded Song of the Year | Nominated | |
| 2022 | Billboard Music Awards | Top Gospel Song | Nominated | |
| 2022 | Grammy Awards | Best Contemporary Christian Music Performance/Song | Nominated | |
| 2022 | BET Awards | Dr. Bobby Jones Best Gospel/Inspirational Award | Nominated | |
| 2022 | GMA Dove Awards | Song of the Year | Nominated | |
| 2022 | GMA Dove Awards | Worship Recorded Song of the Year ("Jireh - Radio Version" by Maverick City Music featuring Chandler Moore, Naomi Raine) | Nominated | |

== Commercial performance ==
"Jireh" debuted at No. 10 on the US Hot Christian Songs chart and at No. 1 on the Hot Gospel Songs chart, both dated April 10, 2021. "Jireh" attracted 2.1 million streams and 4,000 downloads in the United States in its first week. "Jireh" is the first Hot Gospel Songs chart-topper for all four acts, while being the first Hot Christian Songs top ten entry for Maverick City Music, Chandler Moore, and Naomi Raine, and the seventh for Elevation Worship.

"Jireh" debuted at No. 30 on the US Gospel Airplay chart dated September 11, 2021. The song reached No. 1 on the Gospel Airplay chart dated March 26, 2022, becoming the first Gospel Airplay chart-topping entry for all four acts.

== Music videos ==
On March 26, 2021, Elevation Worship released the official music video of "Jireh" on their YouTube channel. The video shows Chandler Moore and Naomi Raine leading the song.

On April 30, 2021, Elevation Worship published the lyric video of the song on YouTube.

== Performances ==
Maverick City Music performed "Jireh" at the 2021 GMA Dove Awards held at the Allen Arena in Nashville, Tennessee on October 19, 2021. Maverick City Music also performed "Jireh" at the 64th Grammy Awards held at the MGM Grand Garden Arena in Las Vegas, Nevada on April 3, 2022. Maverick City Music became the first Christian gospel group to perform at the Grammy Awards show in 20 years. On June 23, 2022, Maverick City Music performed "Jireh" on their Tiny Desk Concert performance as part of NPR Music's commemoration of Black Music Month.

== Other versions ==
- Passion released a version of the song with Maverick City Music on their live album, Burn Bright (2022).
- Nigerian gospel singer Limoblaze, American Christian rapper Lecrae, and British-Nigerian producer Happi and released a remix of the song on June 30, 2022, entitled "Jireh (My Provider)".

== Track listing ==
"Jireh"
| No. | Title | Length |
|---|---|---|
| 1. | "Jireh" (featuring Chandler Moore and Naomi Raine) | 9:58 |

"Jireh" Deluxe — EP
| No. | Title | Producer(s) | Length |
|---|---|---|---|
| 1. | "Jireh" (featuring Chandler Moore, Naomi Raine and Mav City Gospel Choir; Juneteenth Edition) | Chandler Moore; Tony Brown; Jonathan Jay; Aaron Moses; Brandon Lake | 6:00 |
| 2. | "Jireh" (featuring Chandler Moore and Naomi Raine; Radio Version) | Bryan Fowler | 4:44 |
| 3. | "Jireh" (featuring Chandler Moore and Naomi Raine) | Steven Furtick; Jason Ingram; Chris Brown; Tony Brown; Jonathan Jay | 9:58 |
| 4. | "Jireh" (featuring Chandler Moore, Naomi Raine and Mav City Gospel Choir; Stockton, CA Tour Performance) | David Whitworth; Jonathan Jay; Tony Brown | 10:44 |
| Total length: | | | 31:28 |

== Charts ==
=== Weekly charts ===
Weekly chart performance for "Jireh"
| Chart (2021–2022) | Peak position |
|---|---|
| New Zealand Hot Singles (RMNZ) | 30 |
| South Africa Streaming (RISA) | 28 |
| US Hot Christian Songs (Billboard) | 8 |
| US Christian Airplay (Billboard) | 41 |
| US Hot Gospel Songs (Billboard) | 1 |
| US Gospel Airplay (Billboard) | 1 |
| US Digital Song Sales (Billboard) | 30 |

Weekly chart performance for "Jireh (Radio Edit)"
| Chart (2022–2023) | Peak position |
|---|---|
| US Hot Christian Songs (Billboard) | 11 |
| US Christian Airplay (Billboard) | 5 |
| US Christian AC (Billboard) | 8 |
| US Hot Gospel Songs (Billboard) | 3 |
| US Gospel Airplay (Billboard) | 28 |

Weekly chart performance for "Jireh (My Provider)"
| Chart (2022–2023) | Peak position |
|---|---|
| US Afrobeats Songs (Billboard) | 26 |
| US Hot Christian Songs (Billboard) | 28 |
| US Hot Gospel Songs (Billboard) | 11 |

=== Year-end charts ===
Year-end chart performance for "Jireh"
| Chart (2021) | Position |
|---|---|
| US Christian Songs (Billboard) | 23 |
| US Gospel Songs (Billboard) | 6 |
| Chart (2022) | Position |
| US Gospel Songs (Billboard) | 4 |
| US Gospel Airplay (Billboard) | 14 |
| Chart (2023) | Position |
| US Gospel Songs (Billboard) | 1 |
| Chart (2024) | Position |
| US Gospel Songs (Billboard) | 1 |
| Chart (2025) | Position |
| US Gospel Songs (Billboard) | 4 |

Year-end chart performance for "Jireh (Radio Edit)"
| Chart (2022) | Position |
|---|---|
| US Christian Songs (Billboard) | 44 |
| US Christian Airplay (Billboard) | 21 |
| US Christian AC (Billboard) | 25 |
| US Gospel Songs (Billboard) | 10 |

Year-end chart performance for "Jireh (My Provider)"
| Chart (2022) | Position |
|---|---|
| US Afrobeats Songs (Billboard) | 63 |
| Chart (2023) | Position |
| US Afrobeats Songs (Billboard) | 39 |
| US Gospel Songs (Billboard) | 19 |

== Certifications ==
| Region | Certification | Certified units/sales |
|---|---|---|
| United States (RIAA) | 2× Platinum | 2,000,000^{‡} |
^{‡} Sales+streaming figures based on certification alone.

== Release history ==
| Region | Date | Version | Format | Label | Ref. |
|---|---|---|---|---|---|
| Various | March 26, 2021 | Album | Digital download; streaming; (promotional release) | Elevation Worship Records | |
| United States | April 1, 2022 | Radio Edit | Christian radio | Maverick City Music | |
| Various | April 5, 2022 | Deluxe (EP) | Digital download; streaming | Tribl Records | |
