= Gratitude (Brandon Lake song) =

2020 song by Brandon Lake

Single by Brandon Lake

from the album House of Miracles
- Released: June 3, 2022
- Genre: Contemporary worship music
- Length: 5:37 (album version); 3:55 (radio version)
- Label: Bethel Music; Tribl
- Songwriters: Benjamin Hastings; Brandon Lake; Dante Bowe
- Producer: Jacob Sooter

Brandon Lake singles chronology
"Help!" (2022)	"Gratitude" (2022)	"Graves" (2022)

Music videos
- "Gratitude" (Acoustic) on YouTube
- "Gratitude" (Chosen Performance) on YouTube
- "Gratitude" (Live) on YouTube
- "Gratitude" (Radio Version/Lyrics) on YouTube
- "Gratitude" (K-Love/Air1 Radio Version) on YouTube

"Gratitude" is a song by Brandon Lake. The song was released on June 3, 2022, as the third single from his second studio album, House of Miracles (2020). Lake co-wrote the song with Benjamin Hastings and Dante Bowe. Jacob Sooter worked on the production of the single.

The song peaked at number one on the US Hot Christian Songs chart published by Billboard. At the 2023 GMA Dove Awards, "Gratitude" was nominated for Song of the Year and Worship Recorded Song of the Year awards.

== Background ==
"Gratitude" was released as a track on his second studio album, House of Miracles, on August 14, 2020 via Bethel Music. The radio version of "Gratitude" was released on June 3, 2022, making it the third single from the album.

On September 21, 2025, Lake led worship at the memorial service of Charlie Kirk held at State Farm Stadium in Phoenix, Arizona. The assassination of Charlie Kirk occurred in Utah on September 10, 2025. Following this, "Gratitude" re-entered the Billboard Digital Song Sales at No. 1, making it Lake's second leader.

== Writing and development ==
Brandon Lake shared in interview with Billboard that song came about during a trip to Australia to co-write with friends who were in Hillsong. During a writing session with Benjamin Hastings at his apartment overlooking the Sydney Opera House, Lake discussed with Hastings over how they had nothing to God that is impressive, and how humbling it was, thus inspiring the lyrics of the song. Unsatified with the initial production around the song, Lake decided to record the song in one-take with an acoustic guitar for an organic feel, the production of the final version being done afterward.

== Composition ==
"Gratitude" is composed in the key of B with a tempo of 78 beats per minute and a musical time signature of 6/8.

== Critical reception ==
Joshua Andre of 365 Days of Inspiring Media opined that "Gratitude" was "an album highlight, as we hear Brandon’s earnest emotion and raw honesty here, in pure unbridled praise and worship to God, on a song that would fit right at home on a Singalong album from Phil Wickham." JubileeCast's Timothy Yap wrote in his review: "Overwhelmed by the grace of God, this song finds Lake so enthralled in the beauty of Christ that his only response is simply to sing hallelujah to Jesus." Rob Allwright, reviewing for One Man In The Middle, said the contemplative sound was executed brilliantly on "Gratitude" explaining that "maybe it's more because of the subject matter which feels more heartfelt and genuine. There's a bit of a raw passion that comes out as the bridge echoes through with some great vocal work." Katie Clinebell of Air1 described the song as "Brandon Lake’s humble offering of thanksgiving to an infinite God. This gentle ballad explores the tension between Lake’s overwhelming gratitude towards God and the corresponding awareness of the limitations of his own finite humanity."

=== Awards and nominations ===
Awards
Year	Organization	Award	Result	Ref.
2023	GMA Dove Awards	Song of the Year	Nominated	
2023	GMA Dove Awards	Worship Recorded Song of the Year	Won	

== Commercial performance ==
"Gratitude" made its debut at number 45 on Billboard's Hot Christian Songs chart dated February 6, 2021. The song reached number one on the Hot Christian Songs chart dated February 4, 2023, with significant gains in airplay, digital downloads and streaming. "Gratitude" is Lake's second Hot Christian Songs chart-topping single since his feature on Elevation Worship's "Graves into Gardens" reached the summit in February 2021, while also marking his first number one single as a lead artist.

"Gratitude" debuted at number 37 on the US Christian Airplay chart dated July 30, 2022.

== Music videos ==
Bethel Music released the official audio video of "Gratitude" through their YouTube channel on August 28, 2020. On September 23, 2020, Bethel Music published the official acoustic performance video of the song, being performed by Brandon Lake, on YouTube. On February 3, 2021, Bethel Music released the live performance video of "Gratitude" on YouTube. On June 7, 2022, Brandon Lake released the lyric video for the radio version of "Gratitude" via YouTube.

== Performances ==
Brandon Lake performed "Gratitude" on the set of the television drama The Chosen, the performance being featured on a Christmas special episode titled "Christmas With The Chosen: The Messengers".

== Charts ==
=== Weekly charts ===
Weekly chart performance for "Gratitude"
Chart (2021–2023)	Peak position
US Christian AC (Billboard)	1
US Christian Airplay (Billboard)	1
US Digital Song Sales (Billboard)	33
US Hot Christian Songs (Billboard)	1

Chart (2025)	Peak position
US Digital Song Sales (Billboard)	1

=== Year-end charts ===
Year-end chart performance for "Gratitude"
Chart (2022)	Position
US Christian Songs (Billboard)	68
Chart (2023)	Position
US Christian AC (Billboard)	4
US Christian Airplay (Billboard)	2
US Christian Songs (Billboard)	1
Chart (2025)	Position
US Christian Digital Song Sales (Billboard)	4
US Christian Streaming Songs (Billboard)	4

== Certifications ==
Region	Certification	Certified units/sales
United States (RIAA)	Gold	500,000^{‡}
^{‡} Sales+streaming figures based on certification alone.

== Release history ==
Release history for "Gratitude"
Region	Date	Format	Label	Ref.
Various	June 3, 2022	Digital download; streaming	Tribl Records	

== I Am They version ==
"Gratitude"

Single by I Am They

from the album Chapel Sessions
- Released: March 11, 2022
- Recorded: 2022
- Genre: Contemporary worship music
- Length: 4:12
- Label: Big Future
- Producer: Levi Mitchell

I Am They singles chronology
"Christ Be Magnified" (2021)	"Gratitude" (2022)	"Firm Foundation (He Won't)" (2022)

Music video
- "Gratitude" on YouTube

On March 11, 2022, Nevada-based CCM band I Am They released their own cover of the song featuring Cheyenne Mitchell as the lead single to their extended play, Chapel Sessions (2022).

=== Commercial performance ===
The I Am They version of "Gratitude" debuted at number 35 on the Hot Gospel Songs chart dated October 22, 2022.

=== Music videos ===
On March 11, 2022, I Am They released the audio video for the song. I Am They released the official Chapel Sessions video for "Gratitude" featuring Cheyenne Mitchell through their YouTube channel on September 16, 2022.

=== Charts ===
Chart performance for "Gratitude"
Chart (2022)	Peak position
US Christian Songs (Billboard)	18

=== Release history ===
Release history for "Gratitude"
Region	Date	Format	Label	Ref.
Various	March 11, 2022	Digital download; streaming	Big Future Records	

== Other versions ==
- The Worship Initiative released their rendition of the song on their album, The Worship Initiative, Vol. 30 (2022).
- The Voice Season 22 contestant Bodie performed "Gratitude" as his dedication song during the finale on December 12, 2022.
