= Same God =

2022 song by Elevation Worship

- Live version cover

Single by Elevation Worship featuring Jonsal Barrientes

from the album Lion
- Released: June 17, 2022
- Recorded: 2021
- Genre: Contemporary worship music
- Length: 8:01
- Label: Elevation Worship
- Songwriters: Brandon Lake; Chris Brown; Pat Barrett; Steven Furtick
- Producers: Chris Brown; Steven Furtick

Elevation Worship singles chronology
"Jireh" (2022)	"Same God" (2022)

Alternative cover
- Radio version cover

Music videos
- "Same God" on YouTube
- "Same God" (Live from the Loft) on YouTube
- "Same God" (Lyrics) on YouTube

"Same God" is a song performed by American contemporary worship band Elevation Worship. It was released as the second single from their tenth live album, Lion (2022), on June 17, 2022. The song was written by Brandon Lake, Chris Brown, Pat Barrett, and Steven Furtick.

"Same God" peaked at No. 1 on the US Hot Christian Songs chart, becoming Elevation Worship's second chart-topping single. It has been certified gold by Recording Industry Association of America (RIAA). At the 2023 GMA Dove Awards, "Same God" was nominated for the Song of the Year award.

== Background ==
On January 21, 2022, Elevation Worship released "Same God" featuring Jonsal Barrientes as the first promotional single in the lead-up to the release of its parent album, Lion (2022), accompanied with its music video. The radio version of "Same God" was released on June 17, 2022, making it the second single from the album.

Chris Brown of Elevation Worship spoke about song, saying: "I hope the song portrays His character and nature in a way that takes people on a journey and reminds people that we're a part of a great cloud of witnesses that have seen this same faithful God make good on His promises to the generations before us, and those to come after."

== Composition ==
"Same God" is a pop-centric piano ballad, which is composed in the key of D♭ with a tempo of 72.5 beats per minute, and a musical time signature of 4/4. The lyrics of the song describe "the consistent and unchanging nature of God's wisdom, power, goodness and generosity toward His children."

== Critical reception ==
Timothy Yap, reviewing for JubileeCast, opined in his review that the song "has the word "classic worship song" written all over it." Jonathan Andre in his 365 Days of Inspiring Media review opined that "this 8 minute track (it's way too long!) sounds like we're treating God like a genie in a bottle ready to fulfil everything we want rather than what He wants. I'll admit though, this song does have passion and a firm belief that God will do miracles for us when we ask."

=== Awards and nominations ===
Awards
Year	Organization	Award	Result	Ref
2023	GMA Dove Awards	Song of the Year	Nominated	

== Commercial performance ==
"Same God" debuted at No. 21 on the US Hot Christian Songs chart dated February 5, 2022, concurrently charting at number one on the Christian Digital Song Sales chart, and at number 20 on the Christian Streaming Songs chart. "Same God" debuted at No. 50 on the US Christian Airplay chart dated May 28, 2022. The song peaked at number one on the Hot Christian Songs and Christian Airplay charts dated January 21, 2023. "Same God" marks Elevation Worship's second Hot Christian Songs number one single and their third Christian Airplay number one single. It is also the third song to simultaneous reach number one on both charts, after "Graves into Gardens" by Elevation Worship featuring Brandon Lake in February 2021, and "Overcomer" by Mandisa in September 2013.

== Music videos ==
Elevation Worship released the music video for "Same God" featuring Jonsal Barrientes leading the song during an Elevation Church worship service, via YouTube on January 21, 2022. The official lyric video for the song was issued by Elevation Worship through YouTube on March 4, 2022. On June 17, 2022, Elevation Worship published the official audio video for the radio version of "Same God" on YouTube.

On August 24, 2022, Elevation Worship published an acoustic performance video of the song on YouTube. The video was recorded in the loft of a recently restored barn in Charlotte, North Carolina, showing Barrientes and Brandon Lake leading the song.

== Track listing ==
"Same God" (featuring Jonsal Barrientes)
No.	Title	Writer(s)	Producer(s)	Length
1.	"Same God" (featuring Jonsal Barrientes)	Brandon Lake; Chris Brown; Pat Barrett; Steven Furtick	Steven Furtick; Chris Brown	8:01

"Same God" (Radio Version)
No.	Title	Producer(s)	Length
1.	"Same God" (Radio Version)	Steven Furtick; Chris Brown; Jason Ingram	4:24

== Charts ==
=== Weekly charts ===
Weekly chart performance for "Same God"
Chart (2022–2023)	Peak position
US Hot Christian Songs (Billboard)	1
US Christian Airplay (Billboard)	1
US Christian AC (Billboard)	1
US Digital Song Sales (Billboard)	47

=== Year-end charts ===
Year-end chart performance for "Same God"
Chart (2022)	Position
US Christian Songs (Billboard)	28
US Christian Airplay (Billboard)	35
US Christian AC (Billboard)	31
Chart (2023)	Position
US Christian Songs (Billboard)	12
US Christian Airplay (Billboard)	14
US Christian AC (Billboard)	26

== Certifications ==
Region	Certification	Certified units/sales
United States (RIAA)	Platinum	1,000,000^{‡}
^{‡} Sales+streaming figures based on certification alone.

== Release history ==
Region	Date	Version	Format	Label	Ref.
Various	January 21, 2022	Live	Digital download; streaming; (promotional release)	Elevation Worship Records	
Various	June 17, 2022	Radio	Digital download; streaming	Elevation Worship Records	
