= Just like Heaven (Brandon Lake song) =

2020 song by Brandon Lake

Single by Brandon Lake

from the album House of Miracles
- Released: August 14, 2020
- Recorded: 2020
- Genre: Contemporary worship music
- Length: 5:36 (album version); 3:29 (radio version)
- Label: Bethel Music
- Songwriters: Brandon Lake; Jacob Sooter; Jeff Schneeweis
- Producer: Jacob Sooter

Brandon Lake singles chronology
"Graves into Gardens" (2020)	"Just like Heaven" (2020)	"Too Good to Not Believe" (2021)

Alternative cover
- Radio version cover

Music videos
- "Just Like Heaven" on YouTube
- "Just Like Heaven" (Acoustic) on YouTube
- "Just Like Heaven" (Live) on YouTube

"Just like Heaven" is a song by Brandon Lake, which was released as the second single from his second studio album, House of Miracles (2020), on August 14, 2020. Lake co-wrote the song with Jacob Sooter and Jeff Schneeweis. Jacob Sooter worked on the production of the single.

The song peaked at number 36 on the US Hot Christian Songs chart published by Billboard.

== Background ==
On August 14, 2020, Lake released "Just Like Heaven", as the lead single to his second studio album, House of Miracles, following the release of "I Need a Ghost" in July. Lake shared the story behind the song, saying;

"Just Like Heaven” was written after I had a very simple but powerful revelation that when we're in the presence of God we're getting a taste of what heaven and eternity is going to be like. When you get a taste of heaven, you will want more. We were made for eternity. That’s where I want to live. We don't have to wait until heaven to experience it — God wants to bring heaven to earth. This song is my personal journey of crying out for more of His presence.

Lake shared with MultiTracks that on top of the song being his personal cry for more of the presence of God, he hoped that listeners would have an encounter to get "taste of eternity."

On April 30, 2021, Lake a radio-adapted version of the song on digital platforms.

== Composition ==
"Just like Heaven" is an electronic soft piano ballad, composed in the key of F with a tempo of 132 beats per minute and a musical time signature of 4/4.

== Commercial performance ==
"Just like Heaven" made its debut at number 48 on Billboard's Hot Christian Songs chart dated October 10, 2020. It went on to peak at number 36 on the chart, and spent a total of eighteen non-consecutive weeks on Hot Christian Songs Chart.

== Music videos ==
Bethel Music released the official music video of "Just like Heaven" with Brandon Lake singing the song through their YouTube channel on August 14, 2020. On August 25, 2020, Bethel Music published the acoustic performance video of the song on YouTube. The official audio video of the song was uploaded by Bethel Music to YouTube on August 28, 2020.

On February 17, 2021, Bethel Music released the live performance video of "Just like Heaven" on YouTube.

== Track listing ==
"Just like Heaven"
No.	Title	Length
1.	"Just like Heaven"	5:36

"Just like Heaven" (Radio version)
No.	Title	Length
1.	"Just like Heaven" (Radio version)	3:29

== Charts ==
Chart (2020–2021)	Peak position
US Hot Christian Songs (Billboard)	36

== Release history ==
Region	Date	Version	Format	Label	Ref.
Various	August 14, 2020	Album	Digital download; streaming	Bethel Music	
Various	April 30, 2021	Radio	Digital download; streaming	Bethel Music	
