= Dustin Smith =

American Christian musician (born 1975)

- Born: Dustin Ray Smith; July 17, 1975 (age 51)
- Origin: Kansas City, Missouri
- Genres: CCM, worship
- Occupations: Singer, songwriter
- Instruments: Vocals, singer-songwriter
- Years active: 2008–present
- Label: Integrity
- Website: dustinsmith.com

Dustin Ray Smith (born July 17, 1975) is an American Christian musician. His first release with Integrity Music was in 2012, You Are the Fire. This album was his breakthrough release upon the Billboard magazine Heatseekers Albums chart. The subsequent release, Rushing Waters, was just a re-release of You Are the Fire with a bonus DVD disc, but minus the 3 studio tracks. It failed to chart. In 2014 he released a fresh album called Coming Alive, and this charted on the aforementioned chart alongside a charting on the Christian Albums chart.

== Early life ==
Smith was born Dustin Ray Smith on July 17, 1975, and is a preacher's son.

== Personal life ==
He was the worship leader at World Revival Church located in Kansas City, Missouri, where his services were watched from over 200 nations spanning the globe. Smith is married to Jeanna, and they have three children together, two sons and a daughter.

Dustin formed the music group Here Be Lions with his wife and others.

He and his wife, Jeanna, are now the Pastors at HopeUC Nashville.

== Music career ==
Smith's music career commenced with his album, You Are the Fire, was released on July 24, 2012, by integrity Music. This was his breakthrough release upon the Billboard magazine charts, where it placed on the Heatseekers Albums chart at No. 50. The third album, Rushing Waters, was released by Integrity Music on September 10, 2013, yet this album failed to place on any charts. His fourth album, Coming Alive, was released on September 23, 2014, from Integrity Music. This album placed on the aforementioned chart at No. 11 and Christian Albums at No. 19.

== Discography ==
=== Studio albums ===
List of studio albums, with selected chart positions
| Title | Album details | Peak chart positions | |
| Title | Album details | US Christ | US Heat |
|---|---|---|---|
| – | – | | |
| You Are the Fire | Released: July 24, 2012; Label: Integrity; CD, digital download | – | 50 |
| Rushing Waters | Released: September 10, 2013; Label: Integrity; CD, digital download | – | – |
| Coming Alive | Released: September 23, 2014; Label: Integrity; CD, digital download | 19 | 11 |
