= I Need a Ghost =

2020 song by Brandon Lake

Single by Brandon Lake

from the album House of Miracles
- Released: July 24, 2020
- Recorded: 2020
- Genre: Contemporary worship music; rock
- Length: 3:39
- Label: Bethel Music
- Songwriters: Joshua Silverberg; Brandon Lake
- Producer: David Leonard

Brandon Lake singles chronology
"Battle Is the Lord's" (2020)	"I Need a Ghost" (2020)	"Graves into Gardens" (2020)

Music videos
- "I Need a Ghost" on YouTube
- "I Need a Ghost" (Acoustic) on YouTube

"I Need a Ghost" is a song by Brandon Lake, which was released as the lead single from his second studio album, House of Miracles (2020), on July 24, 2020. Lake co-wrote the song with Joshua Silverberg. David Leonard worked on the production of the single.

The song peaked at No. 27 on the US Christian Airplay chart, and at No. 5 on the US Christian Digital Song Sales chart. "I Need a Ghost" received a nomination for the GMA Dove Award Rock/Contemporary Recorded Song of the Year at the 2021 GMA Dove Awards.

== Background ==
On July 24, 2020, Lake released a new single titled "I Need a Ghost", as the lead single to his second studio album, House of Miracles, slated to be released in summer. Lake shared the story behind the song, saying

It was dropped into my spirit as I was sitting in my car and I wrote the entire song without an instrument. It’s an honest reflection of what I was feeling and wanted to say in that moment. You can look to a lot of things in this world to fill a void or be entertained, but the Holy Ghost is where we find true relationship. When Jesus left this earth He gave us His Spirit, and if I’ve received that gift, I can look inward to find what I need.

In an interview with American Songwriter, Lake stated that the instrumentation of "I Need a Ghost" points to multi-faceted dynamic of a relationship with God, with the song demonstrating the "rowdy side" of worship.

== Composition ==
"I Need a Ghost" is a rock song, composed in the key of F♯ minor with a tempo of 74 beats per minute and a musical time signature of 4/4.

== Accolades ==
Awards
Year	Organization	Award	Result	Ref
2021	GMA Dove Awards	Rock/Contemporary Recorded Song of the Year	Nominated	

== Commercial performance ==
In the United States, "I Need a Ghost" made its debut at No. 5 on Billboard's Christian Digital Song Sales chart dated August 8, 2020.

== Music videos ==
Bethel Music released the official music video of "I Need a Ghost" which was directed by filmmaker Mait Hudson, with Brandon Lake singing the song through their YouTube channel on October 27, 2020. On July 31, 2020, Bethel Music published the acoustic performance video of the song on YouTube. The official audio video of the song was uploaded by Bethel Music to YouTube on August 28, 2020.

== Charts ==
Chart (2020–21)	Peak position
US Christian Airplay (Billboard)	27
US Christian Digital Song Sales (Billboard)	5

== Release history ==
Region	Date	Format	Label	Ref.
Various	July 24, 2020	Digital download; streaming	Bethel Music	
