= Graves into Gardens =

2020 live album by Elevation Worship

Live album by Elevation Worship
- Released: May 1, 2020
- Recorded: January – March 2020
- Venues: Elevation Ballantyne, Charlotte, North Carolina, US
- Genres: Worship; CCM
- Length: 64:50
- Labels: Elevation Worship; Provident Label Group
- Producers: Chris Brown; Steven Furtick; Aaron Robertson; Jonathan Mix

Elevation Worship live album chronology
Hallelujah Here Below (2018)	Graves into Gardens (2020)	Old Church Basement (2021)

Elevation Worship chronology
A La Medianoche (2020)	Graves into Gardens (2020)	Tumbas a Jardines (2020)

Singles from Graves into Gardens
- 1. "Never Lost" Released: November 1, 2019; 2. "The Blessing" Released: March 13, 2020; 3. "Graves into Gardens" Released: August 7, 2020; 4. "Rattle!" Released: April 23, 2021

Graves into Gardens is the eighth live album (twelfth album overall) by American contemporary worship band Elevation Worship. It was released on May 1, 2020, via Elevation Worship Records alongside Provident Label Group. The album contains guest appearances by Brandon Lake of Bethel Music, Cody Carnes, Kari Jobe, Tauren Wells and Isaiah Templeton. Steven Furtick, Aaron Robertson, Chris Brown, and Jonathan Mix collaborated on the production of the album.

The album was supported by the release of "The Blessing", "Graves into Gardens" and "Rattle!" as singles. "The Blessing" peaked at No. 15 on the Bubbling Under Hot 100 chart, and No. 2 on the Hot Christian Songs chart in the United States, and has been certified gold by Recording Industry Association of America (RIAA). "Graves into Gardens" became Elevation Worship's highest charting single, registering their first No. 1 single on the Hot Christian Songs chart, and peaking at No. 2 on the Bubbling Under Hot 100 chart. "Rattle!" peaked at No. 4 on the Hot Christian Songs chart, and at No. 25 on the Bubbling Under Hot 100 chart. Elevation Worship had initially intended to further promote the album by embarking on the Elevation Nights 2020 tour with pastor Steven Furtick, but the tour was cancelled due to COVID-19 pandemic.

Graves into Gardens was released to critical acclaim, while achieving commercial success with debuting at No. 1 on Billboard's Top Christian Albums Chart in the United States, and No. 2 on the OCC's Official Christian & Gospel Albums Chart in the United Kingdom, concurrently attaining top 100 mainstream chart entries in the United States, Australia, Canada, Scotland and Switzerland. The album was nominated for Billboard Music Award for Top Christian Album at the 2021 Billboard Music Awards. Graves into Gardens received nominations for the GMA Dove Award Worship Album of the Year and Recorded Music Packaging of the Year at the 2021 GMA Dove Awards, ultimately winning the Recorded Music Packaging of the Year award.

== Background ==
Elevation Worship's Chris Brown shared the meaning behind the album title and its theme, saying:

Many of our songs come from sermons that Pastor Steven preaches. The title track, in particular, launched from a message of his called 'The Mystery of Potential.' He was in that 2 Kings passage which details that after the prophet Elisha died, his story didn't end there. Two Israelites were near his gravesite about to bury another man. When they saw a band of enemy raiders coming, they threw the man's body into Elisha's tomb. As soon as the body touched Elisha’s bones, the man came to life and stood up on his feet (2 Kings 13:20-21). Elisha still had a resurrection miracle left in his bones, and God is still in the business of bringing dead things back to life. If we'll trust God even with the seemingly dead areas of our lives, if we'll believe in the power of God, if we'll declare resurrection power over everything we sow, nothing will be wasted. Nothing is over. God can turn any situation around.

== Recording and production ==
"We love getting in a room with our people and capturing the sound of our church. It’s our favorite way to record the songs God’s given us in that season. There has not been another live recording of ours that has compared to the energy and spirit that was in the room that night."

— Chris Brown, on the decision to release Graves into Gardens as a live album.

The album's nine original tracks were recorded over a night on January 15, 2020, at Elevation Church's Ballantyne campus in Charlotte, North Carolina, where previous Elevation Worship projects have been recorded. Elevation Worship's Chris Brown noted that while most of the songs were written in 2019, "Rattle" and "The Blessing" were written and recorded in early 2020. The band collaborated with Bethel Music's Brandon Lake in writing a number of songs on the album and featured on the album's title track, other collaborators also included Kari Jobe and Cody Carnes on co-writing and leading "The Blessing" as well as Tauren Wells lending his vocals on "Never Lost".

"The Blessing" was written by Jobe, Carnes, together with Steven Furtick and Brown in a writing session on Thursday, February 27, 2020, at Elevation prior to leading it at Elevation's Sunday service on March 1, 2020. "Rattle" was written during quarantine with voice memos and over Zoom calls, and the track was recorded without a live audience, with the band practicing social distancing due to the COVID-19 pandemic.

== Release and promotion ==
=== Singles ===
"The Blessing" was officially released as the lead single of the album on March 20, 2020. The song debuted at No. 3 and No. 4 on the Hot Christian Songs and the Digital Song Sales charts dated April 24, 2020, respectively. The song peaked at No. 2 on the Hot Christian Songs chart, and No. 15 on the Bubbling Under Hot 100 chart.

"Graves into Gardens" was sent to Christian radio stations on August 21, 2020, as the second official single from the album. The song went on to become Elevation Worship's first No. 1 single on the Hot Christian Songs and Christian Airplay charts. The song also peaked at No. 2 on the Bubbling Under Hot 100 chart.

"Rattle!" was released to Christian radio stations in the United States on April 23, 2021, as the third official single from the album and peaked at No. 6 on the Hot Christian Songs chart.

=== Promotional singles ===
On March 14, 2020, the album was availed for pre-order, with "Graves into Gardens" released as the first promotional single from the album. On April 3, 2020, "My Testimony" was released as the second promotional single from the album. "Rattle!" was availed on April 24, 2020, as the album's third promotional single.

On the day of its release, Elevation Worship announced that the project became the highest pre-added worship album to date on Apple Music.

== Touring ==
In October 2019, Premier Productions announced that Elevation Worship alongside Pastor Steven Furtick would be going on their first arena tour, dubbed Elevation Nights 2020. The tour was slated to commence at the H-E-B Center at Cedar Park in Austin, Texas, on May 26, 2020, and set to conclude at Barclays Center in New York City. The band revealed in March 2020 that the tour will be in support of the then upcoming album.

In April 2020, Elevation Worship announced that the Elevation Nights 2020 tour was cancelled in response to combating the COVID-19 pandemic.

== Reception ==
=== Critical response ===
Professional ratings
Review scores
Source	Rating
365 Days of Inspiring Media	4.5/5
CCM Magazine	3.5/5 stars
The Christian Beat	5/5
Hallels	3/5
Jesus Freak Hideout	4/5 stars
One Man In The Middle	4.8/5 stars

Graves into Gardens was met with generally positive reviews. Joshua Andre in his 365 Days of Inspiring Media review praised the album in his review, saying, "I reckon their latest offering is one of the most cohesive ever- yep even more so than Hallelujah Here Below." At CCM Magazine, Dan McIntosh rated the album three-point-five stars out of five, he acknowledged that the collection has "some truly standout tracks," but bemoaned the overall length saying, "this album could have used a little editing." Herb Longs of The Christian Beat gave the album five out of five stars and said that it "dynamically showcases the collective talents of the group while spotlighting a number of special guests". Timothy Yap, in his review for Hallels, felt that the album was underwhelming as it did not match the poetic and artful depiction of the album artwork, saying "Though there are still moments of sublimity, they are all mixed together in what feels like an extremely long album, with one of the songs marathoning close to the 10-minute mark." Michael Weaver of Jesus Freak Hideout complimented the range of the tracks, saying "Elevation manages to break things up just by changing vocalists, but also by completely changing styles. The album features rock, contemporary worship, pop, and gospel music. Not many of the major worship groups are swinging for the fences in this way." Rob Allwright, reviewing for One Man In The Middle, opined "A lot of these songs are faithbuilding and uplifting which is something that is so desperately needed at the moment. Maybe at another time they wouldn’t have hit home quite so strongly, but in the middle of a global pandemic then we need that God is still in control and a reminder of what happens when God says live, even the dead dry bones MUST come to life."

=== Accolades ===
Awards
Year	Organization	Award	Result	Ref
2021	Billboard Music Awards	Top Christian Album	Nominated	
2021	GMA Dove Awards	Worship Album of the Year	Nominated	
2021	GMA Dove Awards	Recorded Music Packaging of the Year	Won	

== Commercial performance ==
In the United States, Graves into Gardens earned 16,000 equivalent album units in its first week of sales, and as a result debuted at No. 1 on the Top Christian Albums Chart dated May 16, 2020, the band's fifth chart-topping release on the tally. The album concurrently registered on the mainstream Billboard 200 chart at No. 34. Graves into Gardens debuted on the OCC's Official Christian & Gospel Albums Chart at No. 2.

Graves into Gardens also appeared at No. 38 on the Australian ARIA Albums Chart, No 66 on the Canadian Albums Chart, No. 39 on Scottish Albums, and No 47 on the Swiss Hitparade.

== Track listing ==
Graves into Gardens — Standard edition
No.	Title	Writer(s)	Length
1.	"My Testimony"	Chris Brown; Steven Furtick; Brandon Lake; Tiffany Hammer	4:51
2.	"Graves into Gardens" (featuring Brandon Lake)	Brown; Furtick; Lake; Hammer	7:32
3.	"The Blessing" (with Kari Jobe and Cody Carnes)	Cody Carnes; Brown; Furtick; Kari Jobe Carnes	8:27
4.	"Available"	Matt Redman; Ben Fielding; Jason Ingram; Brown; Furtick	9:41
5.	"Authority"	Scott Ligertwood; Brooke Ligertwood; Brown; Furtick	5:39
6.	"Never Lost" (featuring Tauren Wells)	Brown; Furtick; Hammer	6:50
7.	"No One Beside"	Brown; Furtick; Hammer	5:56
8.	"Have My Heart (Vamp)"	Furtick; Lake; Hammer	4:04
9.	"There Is a King"	Furtick; Lake; Hammer	5:00
10.	"What Would You Do" (featuring Isaiah Templeton)	Furtick; Isaiah Templeton	6:50
Total length:			64:50

Graves into Gardens — Apple Music standard edition bonus content
No.	Title	Length
11.	"My Testimony" (Music Video)	4:52
12.	"Graves into Gardens" (featuring Brandon Lake; Music Video)	7:32
13.	"Available" (Music Video)	9:40
14.	"Authority" (Music Video)	5:39
15.	"Never Lost" (featuring Tauren Wells; Music Video)	6:51
16.	"No One Beside" (Music Video)	5:57
17.	"Have My Heart (Vamp)" (Music Video)	4:05
18.	"There Is a King" (Music Video)	5:01
19.	"What Would You Do" (featuring Isaiah Templeton; Music Video)	6:46

Graves into Gardens — Deluxe
No.	Title	Writer(s)	Length
1.	"Rattle!"	Brown; Furtick; Lake	7:12
2.	"My Testimony"		4:51
3.	"Graves into Gardens" (featuring Brandon Lake)		7:32
4.	"The Blessing" (with Kari Jobe and Cody Carnes)		8:27
5.	"Available"		9:41
6.	"Authority"		5:39
7.	"Never Lost" (featuring Tauren Wells)		6:50
8.	"No One Beside"		5:56
9.	"Have My Heart (Vamp)"		4:04
10.	"There Is a King"		5:00
11.	"What Would You Do" (featuring Isaiah Templeton)		5:02
12.	"God Said Live"	Brown; Furtick; Lake	3:38
Total length:			75:42

Graves into Gardens — Apple Music deluxe bonus content
No.	Title	Length
13.	"Rattle" (Music Video)	10:29
14.	"My Testimony" (Music Video)	4:52
15.	"Graves into Gardens" (featuring Brandon Lake; Music Video)	7:33
16.	"Available" (Music Video)	9:40
17.	"Authority" (Music Video)	5:39
18.	"Never Lost" (featuring Tauren Wells; Music Video)	6:51
19.	"No One Beside" (Music Video)	5:57
20.	"Have My Heart (Vamp)" (Music Video)	4:05
21.	"There Is a King" (Music Video)	5:01
22.	"What Would You Do" (featuring Isaiah Templeton; Music Video)	6:46

== Personnel ==
Adapted from AllMusic.

- Lizzy Abernethy — background vocals
- Jenna Barrientes — background vocals
- Jonsal Barrientes — vocals
- Vincent Baynard — drums
- Joe Booth — saxophone
- Jacob Boyles — art direction, design, photography
- Chris Brown — acoustic guitar, producer, vocals
- Shantay Brown — background vocals
- Jonathan Buffum — engineer
- Cody Carnes — primary artist, vocals
- David Cook — engineer
- Chunks Corbett — music business affairs
- Elevation Worship — primary artist
- Steven Furtick — executive producer, producer
- Dominic Geralds — drums
- Sam Gibson — mixing
- Tiffany Hammer — vocals
- Ryan Hollingsworth — art direction
- Phillip Howe — trumpet
- Brad Hudson — background vocals, vocal producer
- Kari Jobe — primary artist, vocals
- Andrew Joseph — background vocals
- John Jaeger - Drums
- Brandon Lake — featured artist, acoustic guitar, vocals
- Drew Lavyne — mastering
- Josh Linker — engineer
- David Liotta — acoustic guitar, guitar
- Jonathan Mix — additional production, editing, engineer, Flugelhorn, trumpet
- Davide Mutendji — background vocals
- Jack Nellis — editing, engineer, percussion
- Taylor Noel — background vocals
- Roseanne Parker — background vocals
- Michael Pettus — background vocals
- Paul Rivera — photography
- Aaron Robertson — keyboards, producer, programming
- Anna Sailors — vocals
- Joey Signa — guitar
- Kevin Smith — guitar
- Isaiah Templeton — featured artist, vocals
- Tauren Wells — featured artist, vocals
- Jane Williams — background vocals
- Caleb Wood — background vocals
- Shae Wooten — bass

== Charts ==
=== Weekly charts ===
Weekly chart performance for Graves into Gardens
Chart (2020)	Peak position
Australian Albums (ARIA)	38
Canadian Albums (Billboard)	66
Scottish Albums (Official Charts)	39
Swiss Albums (Schweizer Hitparade)	47
UK Album Downloads (Official Charts)	10
UK Christian & Gospel Albums (OCC)	2
US Billboard 200	34
US Top Christian Albums (Billboard)	1

=== Year-end charts ===
Year-end chart performance for Graves into Gardens
Chart (2020)	Position
US Christian Albums (Billboard)	7
Chart (2021)	Position
US Christian Albums (Billboard)	5
Chart (2022)	Position
US Christian Albums (Billboard)	5
Chart (2023)	Position
US Christian Albums (Billboard)	4
Chart (2025)	Position
US Christian Albums (Billboard)	14

== Release history ==
Region	Date	Version	Format(s)	Label(s)	Ref.
Various	May 1, 2020	Standard	Digital download; streaming	Elevation Worship Records	
Various	May 1, 2020	Deluxe	Digital download; streaming	Elevation Worship Records	
Various	June 12, 2020	Deluxe	CD	Provident Label Group	
