= Graves into Gardens (song) =

- EP cover

Single by Elevation Worship featuring Brandon Lake

from the album Graves into Gardens
- Released: August 7, 2020
- Recorded: January 15, 2020
- Venue: Elevation Ballantyne, Charlotte, North Carolina, US
- Genre: Worship
- Length: 7:34
- Label: Sony Music Nashville / Elevation Worship
- Songwriters: Chris Brown; Steven Furtick; Brandon Lake; Tiffany Hudson
- Producers: Chris Brown; Aaron Robertson

Elevation Worship singles chronology
"The Blessing" (2020)	"Graves into Gardens" (2020)	"Nobody" (2020)

Brandon Lake singles chronology
"I Need a Ghost" (2020)	"Graves into Gardens" (2020)	"Just Like Heaven" (2020)

Music videos
- "Graves into Gardens" (Acoustic) on YouTube
- "Graves into Gardens" (Live) on YouTube
- "Graves into Gardens" (Lyrics) on YouTube
- "Graves into Gardens" (Morning & Evening) on YouTube

"Graves into Gardens" is a song performed by American contemporary worship band Elevation Worship and American contemporary Christian singer-songwriter Brandon Lake which was released as the second single from their eighth live album of the same name, Graves into Gardens (2020), on August 7, 2020. The song was written by Brandon Lake, Chris Brown, Steven Furtick and Tiffany Hudson. Chris Brown and Aaron Robertson handled the production of the single.

"Graves into Gardens" became Elevation Worship's and Brandon Lake's first No. 1 single on the US Hot Christian Songs chart. The song also went on to peak at No. 2 on the Bubbling Under Hot 100 chart, thus becoming the highest-charting single for both acts. It has been certified two-times platinum by Recording Industry Association of America (RIAA). The song won the 2021 Billboard Music Award for Top Christian Song. "Graves into Gardens" won the GMA Dove Award for Worship Recorded Song of the Year, and was nominated for the Song of the Year award, and the Spanish rendition of the song titled "Tumbas A Jardines" for the Spanish Language Recorded Song of the Year award, at the 2021 GMA Dove Awards.

== Background ==
"Graves into Gardens" was initially released by Elevation Worship as the first promotional single from the album Graves into Gardens (2020), on March 13, 2020. On August 7, 2020, Elevation Worship released an EP bundle containing multiple renditions of the song. The song impacted Christian radio stations on August 21, 2020, as the second official single from the album.

On January 8, 2021, Elevation Worship released the album, Graves into Gardens: Morning & Evening which included a new rendition of the song, "Graves into Gardens (Morning & Evening)".

== Writing and development ==
The song was written in 2019, and recorded live at Elevation Church's Ballantyne campus on January 15, 2020, with Brandon Lake featuring on the track as a guest.

In an interview with The Christian Beat, Chris Brown of Elevation Worship shared the story behind the song and why it became the title of the album, saying:

Many of our songs come from sermons that Pastor Steven preaches. The title track, in particular, launched from a message of his called 'The Mystery of Potential.' He was in that 2 Kings passage which details that after the prophet Elisha died, his story didn't end there. Two Israelites were near his gravesite about to bury another man. When they saw a band of enemy raiders coming, they threw the man's body into Elisha's tomb. As soon as the body touched Elisha’s bones, the man came to life and stood up on his feet (2 Kings 13:20-21). Elisha still had a resurrection miracle left in his bones, and God is still in the business of bringing dead things back to life. If we'll trust God even with the seemingly dead areas of our lives, if we'll believe in the power of God, if we'll declare resurrection power over everything we sow, nothing will be wasted. Nothing is over. God can turn any situation around.

== Composition ==
"Graves into Gardens" is composed in the key of B with a tempo of 70 beats per minute, and a musical time signature of 6/8.

== Accolades ==
Awards
Year	Organization	Award	Result	Ref
2021	Billboard Music Awards	Top Christian Song	Won	
2021	GMA Dove Awards	Song of the Year	Nominated	
2021	GMA Dove Awards	Worship Recorded Song of the Year	Won	
2021	GMA Dove Awards	Spanish Language Recorded Song of the Year (for "Tumbas A Jardines")	Nominated	

== Commercial performance ==
"Graves into Gardens" debuted at No. 12 on the US Hot Christian Songs chart dated March 28, 2020, concurrently charting at No. 1 on the Christian Digital Song Sales chart. After 28 weeks, the song broke through to the top ten of the Hot Christian Songs chart, peaking at No. 10 due to a gain in digital sales. "Graves into Gardens" peaked at No. 2 on the Hot Christian Songs chart after spending 43 weeks on the chart, and concurrently debuted on the Bubbling Under Hot 100 chart dated January 16, 2021, at No. 5.

The song debuted on the Christian Airplay chart dated August 8, 2020, at No. 44.

"Graves into Gardens" rose to No. 1 on the Hot Christian Songs and Christian Airplay charts dated February 6, 2021. It is the first chart topping single for both acts on the tallies, and the first single to simultaneously reach No. 1 on the Hot Christian Songs and Christian Airplay charts since "Overcomer" by Mandisa last achieved the feat in September 2013. The song also set the record for the longest climb to No. 1 on Hot Christian Songs with 46 weeks, a record previously held by Jeremy Camp's "Let It Fade".

== Music videos ==
On March 13, 2020, Elevation Worship released the live music video of "Graves into Gardens" recorded at Elevation Church's Ballantyne campus on their YouTube channel. The video has surpassed 100 million views. The acoustic performance video of the song was published on YouTube by Elevation Worship on March 23, 2020. Elevation Worship availed a Spanish rendition of the song, titled "Tumbas A Jardines" on their YouTube channel on July 10, 2020. The studio version lyric video of "Graves into Gardens" was released by Elevation Worship on August 6, 2020.

Elevation Worship released the music video for "Graves into Gardens (Morning & Evening)" on YouTube on January 8, 2021.

== Track listing ==
Digital format — EP
No.	Title	Length
1.	"Graves into Gardens" (Studio)	4:20
2.	"Graves into Gardens" (Live; featuring Brandon Lake)	7:34
3.	"Graves into Gardens"	5:01
4.	"Tumbas A Jardines (Graves into Gardens)" (featuring Brandon Lake)	5:53
5.	"Graves into Gardens" (Remix; featuring Elevation Rhythm)	3:37
Total length:		26:26

== Charts ==
=== Weekly charts ===
Weekly chart performance for "Graves into Gardens"
Chart (2020–2021)	Peak position
US Bubbling Under Hot 100 (Billboard)	2
US Hot Christian Songs (Billboard)	1
US Christian Airplay (Billboard)	1
US Christian AC (Billboard)	1
US Digital Song Sales (Billboard)	26

=== Year-end charts ===
Year-end chart performance for "Graves into Gardens"
Chart (2020)	Position
US Christian Songs (Billboard)	18
Chart (2021)	Position
US Christian Songs (Billboard)	7
US Christian Airplay (Billboard)	16
US Christian AC (Billboard)	17
US Weekend Top 20	9

== Certifications ==
Region	Certification	Certified units/sales
United States (RIAA)	2× Platinum	2,000,000^{‡}
^{‡} Sales+streaming figures based on certification alone.

== Release history ==
Region	Date	Format	Label	Ref.
Various	March 13, 2020	Digital download (promotional release); streaming (promotional release)	Elevation Worship Records	
Various	August 7, 2020	Digital download (EP); streaming (EP)	Elevation Worship Records	
United States	August 21, 2020	Christian adult contemporary radio	Elevation Worship Records	

== Other versions ==
- American CCM duo Shane & Shane covered the song for its extended play titled The Worship Initiative Vol. 21 (2020).
- Brandon Lake released his own rendition of "Graves into Gardens" on his second studio album, House of Miracles (2020).
- Koryn Hawthorne released a live performance version of the song as part of the Essential Worship Song Sessions series on YouTube.
- Bethel Music released their rendition of the song with Brandon Lake on their studio album, Peace, Vol. II (2021).
- Lag Season released their edition of the song as a non-album single (2024).
