= Steven Furtick =

American pastor and musician

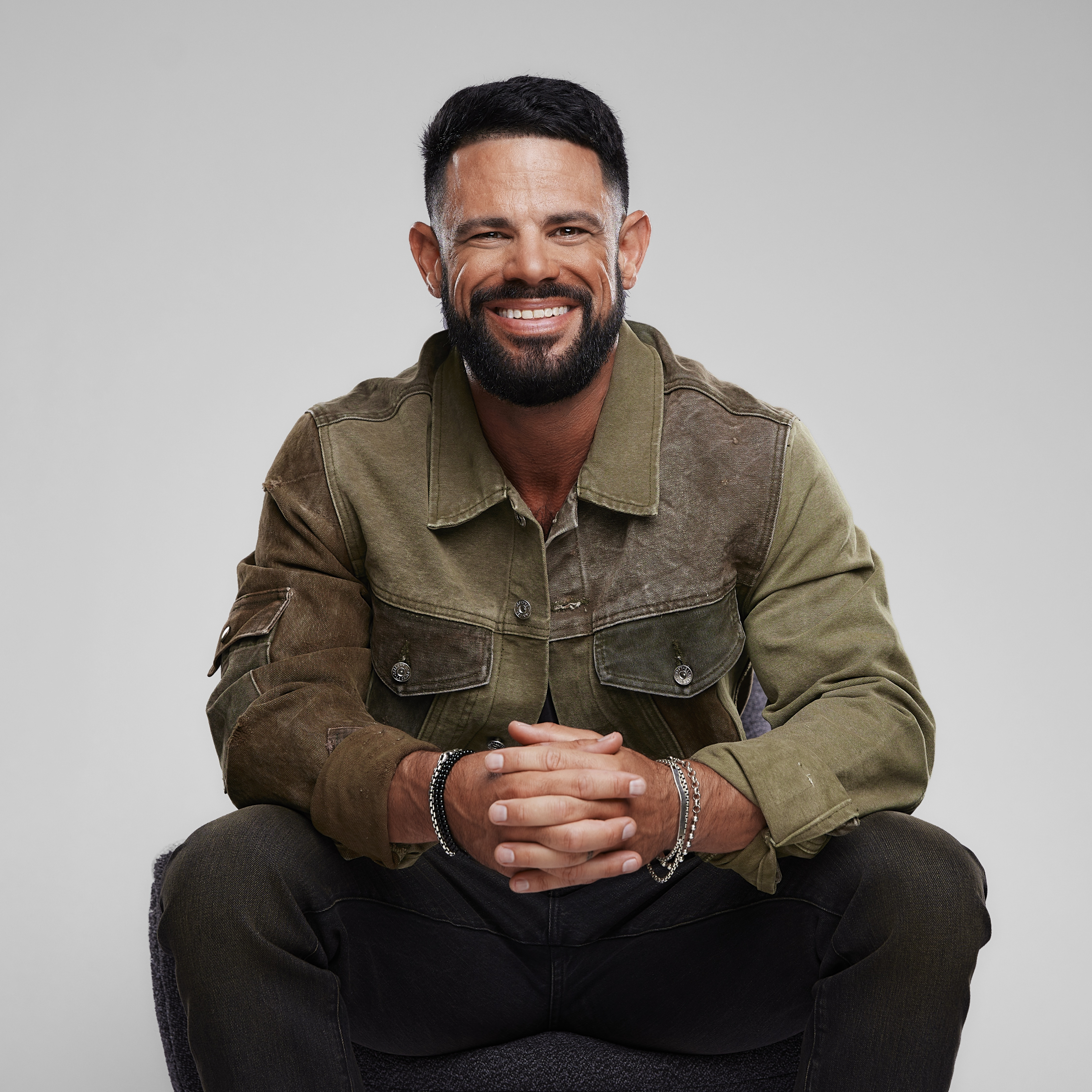
- Pastor Steven Furtick in 2023
- Church: Elevation Church

Orders
- Ordination: 2006

Personal details
- Born: Larry Stevens Furtick; February 19, 1980 (age 46) Moncks Corner, South Carolina, U.S.
- Spouse: Holly Furtick (m. 2002)
- Children: 3
- Occupation: preacher, singer, pastor, author, songwriter
- Education: North Greenville University; Southern Baptist Theological Seminary
- Musical career
- Member of: Elevation Worship; Sons of Sunday
- Years active: 2004–present
- Website: www.stevenfurtick.com

Larry Stevens Furtick Jr. (born February 19, 1980), known professionally as Steven Furtick, is an American pastor, author, singer, and composer of Elevation Worship. He is the founder and general overseer of Elevation Church, based in Charlotte, North Carolina.

== Early life and education ==
Furtick was born and raised in Moncks Corner, South Carolina, and attended Berkeley High School. At the age of 16, after reading the book Fresh Wind, Fresh Fire by Jim Cymbala, he felt called to pastor a church in a major city. He studied at North Greenville University in communication and earned a Bachelor of Arts; he then studied at Southern Baptist Theological Seminary and earned a Master of Divinity.

== Ministry ==
In 2004, Furtick served as worship leader at Christ Covenant Church in Shelby, North Carolina, a Baptist Church. In 2006, he moved to Charlotte, North Carolina and founded Elevation Church with seven families and his own. The church had their first service on February 5, 2006.

In 2007, he helped found the music group Elevation Worship as a songwriter and since has been nominated for GMA Dove and Grammy Awards, winning a Grammy for their album, Old Church Basement.

In 2007, he made headlines when his church gave $40,000 to members in envelopes with $5, $20 and even $1,000, telling them to spend it kindly on others.

Furtick speaks at events all over the world including the 2011 Global Leadership Summit hosted by Bill Hybels, the C3 Conference 2012 hosted by Ed Young Jr., the Hillsong Conference 2012 hosted by Brian Houston, and the Presence Conference in 2012 and 2013 hosted by Phil Pringle. Furtick also participated in The Elephant Room 1 and The Elephant Room 2 hosted by James MacDonald. Furtick was named to Oprah's SuperSoul100 list of visionaries and influential leaders in 2016.

In 2012, in response to a need of mentorship for 1,000 students in area schools, Furtick launched an outreach program at Elevation Church called the M1 Initiative. Furtick said: "We have always said we want to be a blessing to our city and support our leaders with a volunteer force they can count on." More than 1,600 members responded and committed to mentoring a child for the 2012–2013 school year.

Furtick has committed to donating 12 percent of Elevation Church's giving to support outreach efforts nationally and globally.

== Public life and media ==
Furtick is a New York Times best selling author. He has also participated in various philanthropic campaigns, donating clothes and furniture to families in need.

In 2013, Furtick declined to answer questions regarding his salary, his tax-free housing allowance, how much he makes from books and speaking fees, and how the church is governed. Elevation has stated that Furtick is generous to the church with the money he receives from writing books—that he arranges for the church to purchase his books directly from the publisher, allowing Elevation to receive the author's discount and keep the money from sales. They have also reported that the publisher pays the church to produce marketing materials to promote Furtick's books. Elevation has confirmed that Furtick's salary is set by a Board of Overseers composed of other megachurch pastors, who vote on his salary based on a compensation study conducted by an outside firm, and that Furtick does not vote on his own salary.

On October 2, 2020, Trinity Broadcasting Network began airing programming from Furtick, replacing the Kenneth Copeland ministries program Believer's Voice of Victory.

== Bibliography ==
- Furtick, Steven (2010). Sun Stand Still: What Happens When You Dare to Ask God for the Impossible. Multnomah Books. ISBN 978-1-60142-322-1.
- Furtick, Steven (2012). Greater: Dream Bigger. Start Smaller. Ignite God's Vision for Your Life. Multnomah Books. ISBN 978-1-60142-325-2.
- Furtick, Steven (2014). Crash The Chatterbox: Hearing God's Voice Above All Others. Multnomah Books. ISBN 978-1-60142-456-3.
- Furtick, Steven (2016). (Un)Qualified: How God Uses Broken People to Do Big Things. Multnomah Books. ISBN 978-1601424594.
- Furtick, Steven (2017). Seven-Mile Miracle: Journey Into the Presence of God Through the Last Words of Jesus. Multnomah Books. ISBN 978-160142-922-3.
- Furtick, Steven (2024). Do the New You: 6 Mindsets to Become Who You Were Created to Be. Multnomah Books. ISBN 978-154600-682-4.
- Furtick, Steven (2026). Do the True You: Stop Faking It for Others and Find Out Who God Says You Are. Hachette Nashville. ISBN 978-154600-968-9.

== Awards and nominations ==
=== GMA Dove Awards ===
Year	Nominee / work	Award	Result
2017	"O Come to the Altar" (credited as songwriter)	Song of the Year	Nominated
2017	"O Come to the Altar" (credited as songwriter)	Worship Song of the Year	Nominated
2018	"Do It Again" (credited as songwriter)	Worship Song of the Year	Nominated
2020	"See a Victory" (credited as songwriter)	Song of the Year	Nominated
2020	"The Blessing (Live)" (credited as songwriter)	Worship Recorded Song of the Year	Won
2021	"Graves into Gardens" (credited as songwriter)	Song of the Year	Nominated
2021	"The Blessing" (credited as songwriter)	Song of the Year	Won
2021	Himself	Songwriter of the Year (Non-artist)	Nominated
2021	"Never Lost" (credited as songwriter)	Contemporary Gospel Recorded Song of the Year	Nominated
2021	"Tumbas A Jardines" (credited as songwriter)	Spanish Language Recorded Song of the Year	Nominated
2021	"Graves into Gardens" (credited as songwriter)	Worship Recorded Song of the Year	Won
2021	"Jireh" (credited as songwriter)	Worship Recorded Song of the Year	Nominated
2021	Graves into Gardens (credited as producer)	Worship Album of the Year	Nominated
2021	Old Church Basement (credited as producer)	Worship Album of the Year	Won
2021	Living Color (credited as producer)	Children's Album of the Year	Nominated
2022	"Jireh" (credited as songwriter)	Song of the Year	Nominated
2022	"Jireh" (credited as songwriter)	Worship Recorded Song of the Year	Nominated
2022	"Rattle!" (credited as songwriter)	Song of the Year	Nominated
2022	Lion (credited as producer and art director)	Worship Album of the Year	Nominated
2022	Lion (credited as producer and art director)	Recorded Music Packaging of the Year	Nominated
2026	Himself	Songwriter of the Year	Pending

=== Grammy Awards ===
Year	Nominee / work	Award	Result	Source
2019	Hallelujah Here Below	Best Contemporary Christian Music Album	Nominated	
2021	"The Blessing" (credited as songwriter)	Best Contemporary Christian Performance/Song	Nominated	
2022	Old Church Basement	Best Contemporary Christian Music Album	Won	
2026	"Hard Fought Hallelujah" (credited as songwriter)	Best Contemporary Christian Music Performance/Song	Won	
