= Maverick City Music discography =

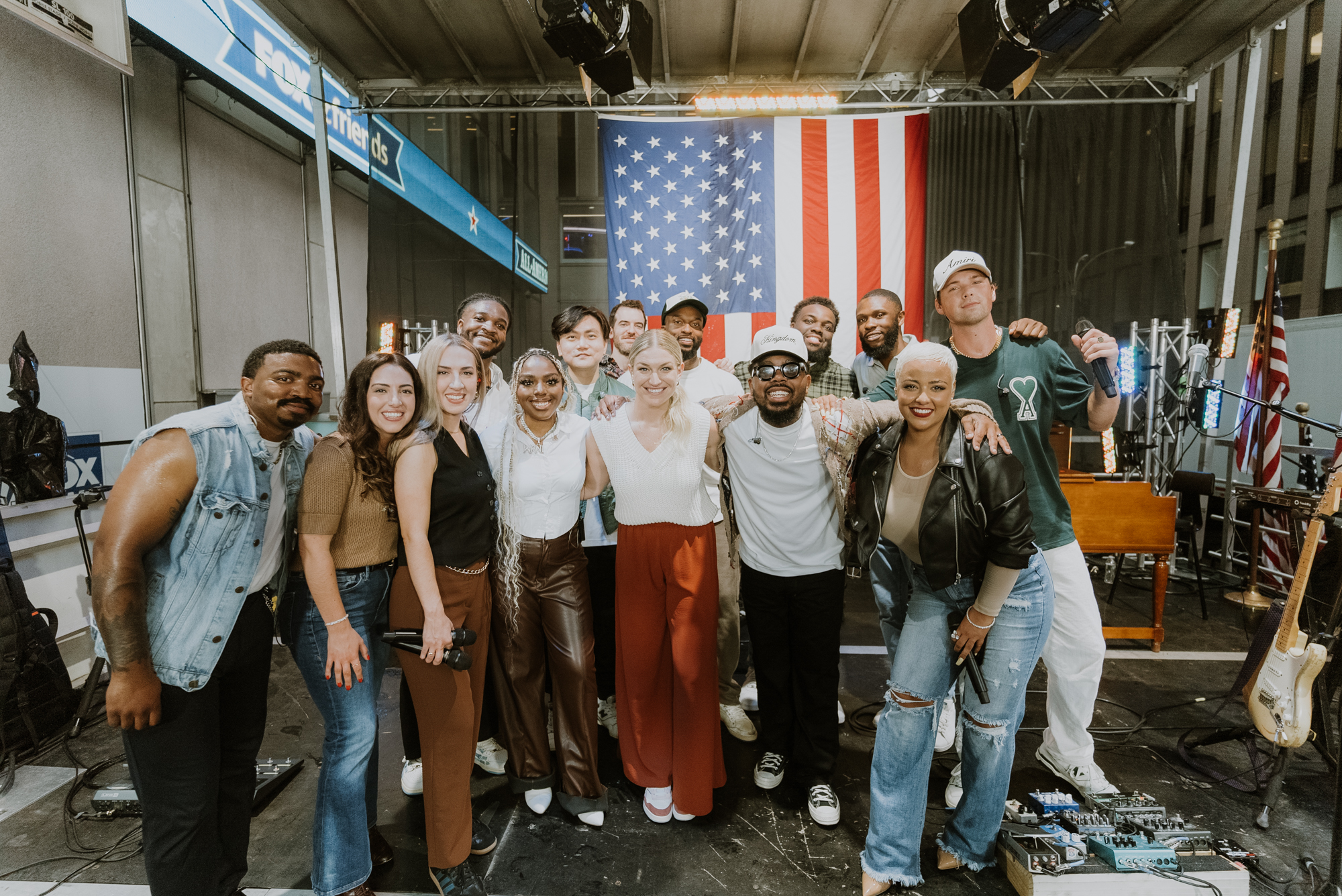
- EPs: 7
- Live albums: 11
- Singles: 12

American contemporary worship music collective Maverick City Music has released 11 live albums, seven extended plays, 12 singles, and three promotional singles.

== Albums ==
List of albums, with selected chart positions
Title	Album details	Peak chart positions								Certifications
Title	Album details	US	US Christ.	US Gospel	AUS	CAN	NZ	SWI	UK C&G	Certifications
Maverick City Vol. 3 Part 1	Debut album; Released: April 17, 2020; Label: Maverick City Music; Format: Digital download, streaming	— (Note: Maverick City Vol. 3 Part 1 did not enter the Billboard 200, but peaked at No. 64 on the Top Album Sales Chart.)	6	2	—	—	—	—	15	
Maverick City, Vol. 3 Pt. 2	Released: October 9, 2020; Label: Maverick City Music; Format: Digital download, streaming	— (Note: Maverick City, Vol. 3 Pt. 2 did not enter the Billboard 200, but peaked at No. 99 on the Top Album Sales Chart.)	4	2	—	—	—	—	8	
Como En El Cielo	First Spanish-language album; Released: March 19, 2021; Label: Tribl; Format: Digital download, streaming	—	—	—	—	—	—	—	—	
Old Church Basement (with Elevation Worship)	Released: April 30, 2021; Label: Elevation Worship; Format: Digital download, streaming	30	1	1	51	78	35	93	2	RIAA: Gold
Jubilee: Juneteenth Edition	Released: June 18, 2021; Label: Tribl; Format: Digital download, streaming	—	8	2	—	—	—	—	10	
Tribl I (with Tribl)	Released: July 23, 2021; Label: Tribl; Format: Digital download, streaming	—	10	3	—	—	—	—	—	
Venga Tu Reino	Second Spanish-language album; Released: October 1, 2021; Label: Tribl; Format: Digital download, streaming	—	—	—	—	—	—	—	—	
Tribl Nights Anthologies (with Tribl)	Released: April 29, 2022; Label: Tribl; Format: Digital download, streaming	—	41	6	—	—	—	—	—	
Simple Adoración	Third Spanish-language album; Released: June 10, 2022; Label: Tribl; Format: Digital download, streaming	—	—	—	—	—	—	—	—	
Kingdom Book One (with Kirk Franklin)	Released: June 17, 2022; Label: Tribl, Fo Yo Soul, RCA Inspiration; Format: Digital download, streaming	151	2	2	—	—	—	—	5	
The Maverick Way Complete	Released: October 27, 2023; Label: Tribl; Format: Digital download, streaming	96	1	1	—	—	—	—	—	
I Was Made to Glorify Your Name (with Dante Bowe and Grace Idowu)	Released: February 27, 2026; Label: Tribl; Format: Digital download, streaming	—	30	6	—	—	—	—	—	
Holy (with Dante Bowe and Grace Idowu)	Released: June 26, 2026; Label: Tribl; Format: Digital download, streaming	—	—	8	—	—	—	—	—	
"—" denotes a recording that did not chart or was not released in that territory.

=== Live albums ===
List of albums, with selected chart positions
Title	Album details	Peak chart positions	
Title	Album details	US Christ.	US Gospel
Live at Maverick City	Released: February 7, 2025; Label: Tribl; Format: Digital download, streaming	2	1
"—" denotes a recording that did not chart or was not released in that territory.

=== Christmas albums ===
List of albums, with selected chart positions
Title	Album details	Peak chart positions		
Title	Album details	US Christ.	US Gospel	UK C&G
A Very Maverick Christmas	Released: November 30, 2021; Label: Tribl; Format: Digital download, streaming	9	3	5
A Very Very Maverick Christmas	Released: November 14, 2025; Label: Tribl; Format: Digital download, streaming	—	9	—
"—" denotes a recording that did not chart or was not released in that territory.

=== Instrumental cover albums ===
List of albums, with selected chart positions
Title	Album details
Echoes of Faith Vol. 1 (with The Prayer Project)	Released: March 7, 2025; Label: Tribl; Format: Digital download, streaming
Echoes of Faith Vol. 2 (with The Prayer Project)	Released: October 31, 2025; Label: Tribl; Format: Digital download, streaming

== EPs ==
List of EPs, with selected chart positions
Title	Album details	Peak chart positions		
Title	Album details	US	US Christ.	US Gospel
Maverick City, Vol. 1	Debut EP; Released: July 29, 2019; Label: Maverick City Music; Format: Digital download, streaming	—	—	10
Maverick City, Vol. 2	Released: November 12, 2019; Label: Maverick City Music; Format: Digital download, streaming	—	35	—
You Hold It All Together (with Upperroom)	Released: November 20, 2020; Label: Maverick City Music; Format: Digital download, streaming	—	20	2
Maverick City Christmas	Released: November 27, 2020; Label: Maverick City Music; Format: Digital download, streaming	—	—	4
Move Your Heart (with Upperroom)	Released: January 29, 2021; Label: Maverick City Music; Format: Digital download, streaming	— (Note: Move Your Heart did not enter the Billboard 200, but peaked at No. 88 on the Top Current Album Sales.)	15	1
Jubilee	Released: February 26, 2021; Label: Tribl Records; Format: Digital download, streaming	— (Note: Jubilee did not enter the Billboard 200, but peaked at No. 99 on the Top Current Album Sales.)	14	2
Breathe	Released: February 11, 2022; Label: Tribl Records; Format: Digital download, streaming	—	16	4
Love Made a Way (with Dante Bowe)	Released: December 5, 2025; Label: Tribl Records; Format: Digital download, streaming	—	39	6
"—" denotes a recording that did not chart or was not released in that territory.

== Singles ==
=== As lead artist ===
List of singles and peak chart positions
Title	Year	Peak positions						Certifications	Album
Title	Year	US Bubb.	US Christ	US Christ Air.	US Christ AC	US Gospel	US Gospel Air	Certifications	Album
"Man of Your Word" (featuring Chandler Moore and KJ Scriven)	2020	—	18	17	11	—	—		Maverick City Vol. 3 Part 1
"Acercame" (featuring Johnny Peña and Laila Olivera)	2021	—	—	—	—	—	—		Como En El Cielo
"Promises" (featuring Joe L Barnes and Naomi Raine)	2021	11	1	1	3	1	—	RIAA: Platinum	Maverick City Vol. 3 Part 1
"Breathe" (featuring Jonathan McReynolds and Doe)	2021	—	31	—	—	10	—		Jubilee: Juneteenth Edition
"Aleluya" (featuring Aaron Moses and Laila Olivera)	2021	—	—	—	—	—	—		Venga Tu Reino
"Silent Night (Heavenly Peace)" (with We the Kingdom and Dante Bowe)	2021	—	—	24	12	—	—		A Family Christmas (EP)
"Firm Foundation (He Won't)" (featuring Moore and Cody Carnes)	2022	—	35	—	—	10	—		The Maverick Way Complete
"Jireh" (with Elevation Worship featuring Moore and Raine)	2022	—	8	5	8	1	1	RIAA: 2× Platinum; RMNZ: Gold	Old Church Basement
"Worthy of My Song (Worthy of It All)" (with Phil Wickham and Moore featuring Mav City Gospel Choir)	2022	—	27	—	—	11	—		The Maverick Way Complete
"Fear Is Not My Future" (with Kirk Franklin featuring Brandon Lake and Moore)	2022	—	13	17	18	4	—		Kingdom Book One
"Mary Did You Know?" (featuring Moore, Morgan, and Mav City Gospel Choir)	2022	—	19	15	8	7	—		A Very Maverick Christmas
"No Longer Bound (I'm Free)" (featuring Moore and Forrest Frank)	2023	—	19	—	—	5	—		The Maverick Way Complete
"Constant" (with Dante Bowe featuring Jordin Sparks, Anthony Gargiula, and Chandler Moore)	2024	—	10	—	—	1	1		Holy
"All That I Need" (with Dante Bowe featuring GRAHAM)	2025	—	26	—	—	3	—		Holy
"Lift Me Up" (with Dante Bowe featuring Graham)	2025	—	—	—	—	— (Note: Lift Me Up did not enter the Billboard Hot Gospel Songs, but peaked at No. 8 on the Gospel Digital Song Sales.)	—		Holy
"Diamond (I See the Glory)" (with Dante Bowe featuring Jordin Sparks and Mara Justine)	2025	—	—	—	—	15	—		Holy
"Run 2 U" (featuring Hindrix Brown)	2026	—	36	—	—	6	2		Holy
"—" denotes a recording that did not chart.

=== As featured artist ===
List of featured singles and peak chart positions
Song	Year	Peak positions				Album
Song	Year	US Christ	US Christ Air.	US Christ AC	US Gospel	Album
"You Are the Lord" (Live) (Passion featuring Brett Younker and Maverick City Music)	2021	—	—	—	—	Breakthrough Miracle Power / You Are the Lord (single)
"Joy to the World (Joyful, Joyful)" (Live from The Chosen) (Phil Wickham featuring Jordan Feliz, Bryan Torwalt, Katie Torwalt, Maverick City Music, and The Bonner Family)	2021	—	—	—	—	Non-album single
"God Really Loves Us" (Crowder and Dante Bowe featuring Maverick City Music)	2022	3	3	4	1	Milk & Honey
"I Need Help" (Connor Price featuring Maverick City Music, Taylor Hill, and Nick Day)	2024	14	—	—	—	Non-album single
"—" denotes a recording that did not chart.

== Promotional singles ==
List of promotional singles and peak chart positions
Title	Year	Peak positions				Certifications	Album
Title	Year	US Christ	US Christ Air.	US Gospel	US Gospel Air.	Certifications	Album
"Talking to Jesus" (with Elevation Worship featuring Brandon Lake)	2021	9	—	1	—	RIAA: Gold	Old Church Basement
"Wait on You" (with Elevation Worship featuring Dante Bowe and Chandler Moore)	2021	9	37	1	—	RIAA: Gold	Old Church Basement
"Still Holy" (with Tribl featuring Ryan Ofei and Naomi Raine)	2021	—	—	—	—		Tribl I
"Too Good to Not Believe" (with Tribl featuring Lizzie Morgan, Cecily, and Melvin Crispell III)	2022	—	—	—	—		Tribl Nights Anthologies
"King of Heaven (Reign Jesus Reign)" (with Tribl featuring Ryan Ofei, Nate Diaz, and Morgan)	2022	—	—	—	—		Tribl Nights Anthologies
"Cómo Te Amamos" (featuring Karen Espinosa and Johnny Peña)	2022	—	—	—	—		Simple Adoración
"Tesoro" (featuring Aaron Moses and Tianna),	2022	—	—	—	—		Simple Adoración
"Kingdom" (with Kirk Franklin featuring Naomi Raine and Chandler Moore)	2022	17	—	6	1		Kingdom Book One
"Bless Me" (with Franklin)	2022	19	—	8	—		Kingdom Book One
"Exodus" (with Franklin)	2022	—	—	—	—		Kingdom Book One (Deluxe)
"The Name" (with Franklin featuring Lake and Maryanne J. George)	2022	—	—	—	—		Kingdom Book One (Deluxe)
"Your Way's Better" (Forrest Frank cover)	2025	—	—	—	—		Echoes of Faith Vol. 2
"I Know a Name" (Brandon Lake cover)	2025	—	—	—	—		Echoes of Faith Vol. 2
"Promises"	2025	—	—	—	—		Echoes of Faith Vol. 2
"—" denotes a recording that did not chart.

== Other charted songs ==
List of songs and peak chart positions
Title	Year	Peak positions		Certifications	Album
Title	Year	US Christ	US Gospel	Certifications	Album
"Getting Ready" (with Upperroom featuring Abbie Gamboa, Naomi Raine, and Joel Figueroa)	2020	—	— (Note: "Getting Ready" did not enter the Hot Gospel Songs chart, but peaked at No. 4 on the Gospel Digital Song Sales chart.)		You Hold It All Together (EP)
"Remember" (with Upperroom featuring Dante Bowe and Eniola Abioye)	2020	49	24		You Hold It All Together (EP)
"When I Lock Eyes With You" (with Upperroom featuring Brandon Lake and Elyssa Smith)	2020	—	— (Note: "When I Lock Eyes With You" did not enter the Hot Gospel Songs chart, but peaked at No. 5 on the Gospel Digital Song Sales chart.)		You Hold It All Together (EP)
"Champion" (with Upperroom featuring Lake and Maryanne J. George)	2020	48	20		You Hold It All Together (EP)
"Closer" (Maverick City Music featuring Lake)	2021	45	—		Maverick City, Vol. 3 Pt. 2
"Rest on Us" (with Upperroom featuring Lake and Eniola Abioye)	2021	36	12	RIAA: Gold	Move Your Heart (EP)
"Move Your Heart" (with Upperroom featuring Bowe and Smith)	2021	36	15		Move Your Heart (EP)
"Come and Behold" (with Upperroom featuring Chandler Moore and Smith)	2021	46	25		Move Your Heart (EP)
"I Thank God" (with Upperroom featuring Bowe, Aaron Moses, Maryanne J. George, and Chuck Butler)	2021	29	7	RIAA: Gold	Move Your Heart (EP)
"Jubilee" (featuring Raine and Bryan & Katie Torwalt)	2021	34	12		Jubilee (EP)
"Old Church Basement" (with Elevation Worship featuring Bowe)	2021	15	4		Old Church Basement
"Million Little Miracles" (with Elevation Worship featuring Joe L. Barnes)	2021	23	7		Old Church Basement
"Shall Not Want" (with Elevation Worship featuring Moore)	2021	24	8		Old Church Basement
"Come Again" (with Elevation Worship featuring Lake and Moore)	2021	29	11		Old Church Basement
"Used to This" (with Elevation Worship featuring Raine and Lake)	2021	27	10		Old Church Basement
"Names" (with Elevation Worship featuring Tiffany Hudson)	2021	31	15		Old Church Basement
"Mercy" (with Elevation Worship featuring Chris Brown	2021	18	6		Old Church Basement
"Before and After" (with Elevation Worship featuring Amanda Lindsey Cook)	2021	34	17		Old Church Basement
"Build Your Church" (with Elevation Worship featuring Raine and Chris Brown	2021	25	9		Old Church Basement
"Make It Right" (featuring Dante Bowe, Todd Dulaney, Jekalyn Carr, and Mav City Gospel Choir)	2021	47	24		Jubilee: Juneteenth Edition
"Revelation 19:1" (featuring Raine and Mav City Gospel Choir)	2021	—	24		A Very Maverick Christmas
"Heal Our Land / Come & Move" (featuring Barnes, Maryanne J. George, and Mav City Gospel Choir)	2022	50	24		Breathe (EP)
"Jealous" (Maverick City Music and Kirk Franklin featuring Moore and Morgan)	2022	47	—		Kingdom Book One
"Talkin Bout (Love)" (Maverick City Music and Franklin featuring Moore and Morgan)	2022	46	—		Kingdom Book One
"God's Got Us" (Maverick City Music and Franklin featuring Moore)	2022	50	—		Kingdom Book One (Deluxe)
"Praise You Through It" (Maverick City Music with Dante Bowe featuring Bear Bailey)	2025	—	12		Holy
"Love Made a Way" (Maverick City Music with Dante Bowe)	2025	—	14		Holy
"I Was Made to Glorify Your Name" (Maverick City Music with Dante Bowe and Grace Idowu)	2026	42	6		Holy
"Holy" (Maverick City Music with Dante Bowe and Grace Idowu)	2026	—	14		Holy
"—" denotes a recording that did not chart.

== Other appearances ==
Song	Year	Album	Ref.
"No Doubt About It" (Live in Studio) (We the Kingdom featuring Maverick City Music)	2021	Holy Water (Deluxe)	
"Child of Love" (Live in Studio) (We the Kingdom featuring Maverick City Music)	2021	Holy Water (Deluxe)	
"Awesome" (Charles Jenkins featuring Osby Berry, Moore, and Maverick City Music)	2021	My Very OWN Easter (EP)	
"Sweet Jesus" (Crowder featuring Maverick City Music)	2021	Milk & Honey	
"Came Too Far" (Fridayy featuring Maverick City Music and Fridayy's mother)	2023	Fridayy	
