= Dante Bowe discography =

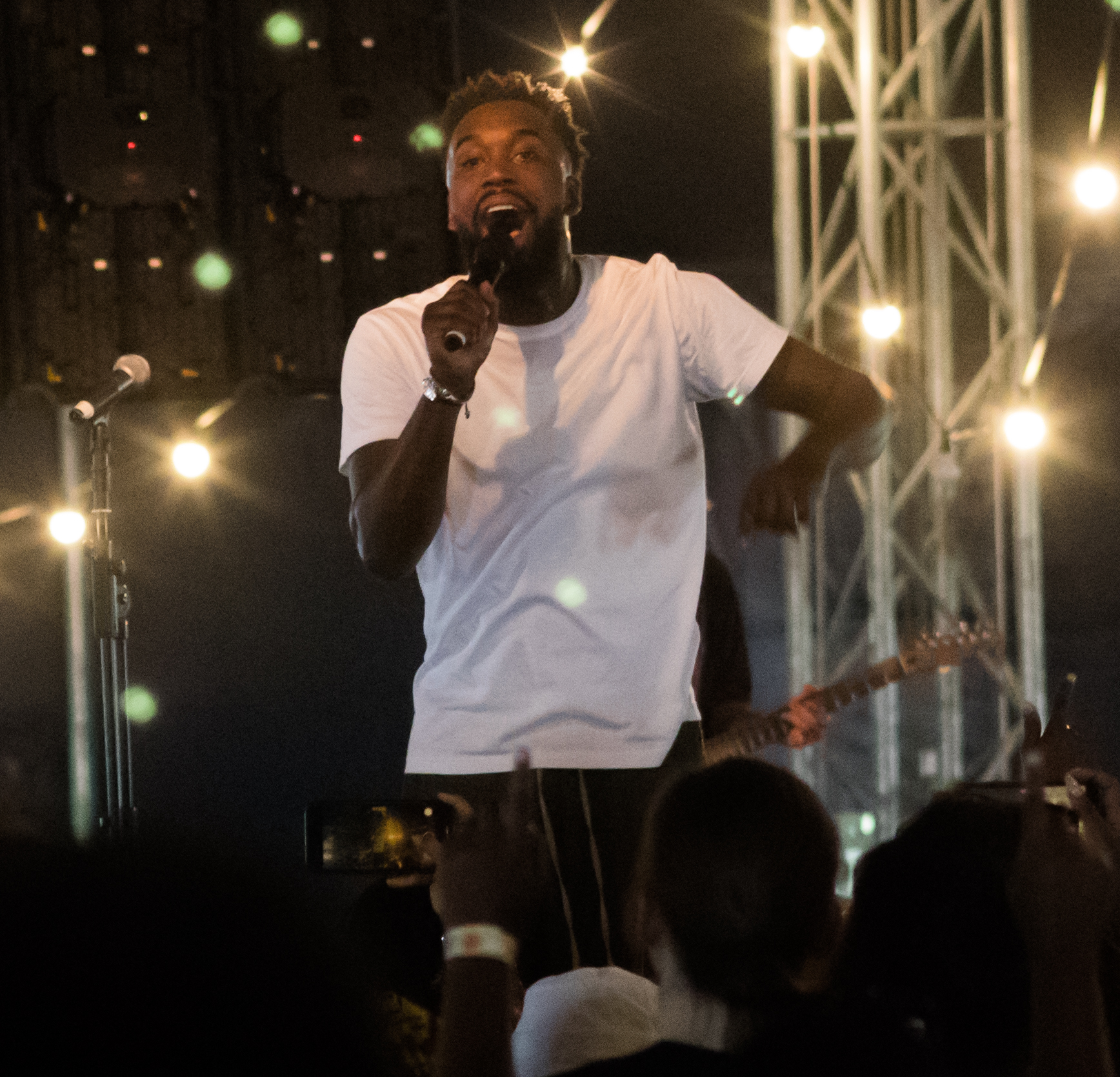
- Dante Bowe performing at the Big Church Festival at Wiston, West Sussex in 2022
- Studio albums: 2
- Singles: 26

American Christian musician Dante Bowe has released two studio albums, and twenty-six singles (including two promotional singles).

== Studio albums ==
List of studio albums, with selected chart positions
Title	Album details	Peak chart positions	
Title	Album details	US Christ.	US Gospel
Son of a Father	Released: March 31, 2017; Label: Independent; Format: Digital download, streaming	—	—
Circles	Released: March 26, 2021; Label: Bethel Music; Format: Digital download, streaming	—	7
Dante Bowe	Released: July 21, 2023; Label: TRUE Music; Format: Digital download, streaming	—	—
I Was Made to Glorify Your Name (with Maverick City Music and Grace Idowu)	Released: February 27, 2026; Label: Tribl Records; Format: Digital download, streaming	30	6
Holy (with Maverick City Music and Grace Idowu)	Released: June 26, 2026; Label: Tribl; Format: Digital download, streaming	—	8
"—" denotes a recording that did not chart

== EPs ==
List of EPs, with selected chart positions
Title	Album details	Peak chart positions	
Title	Album details	US Christ.	US Gospel
Love Made a Way (with Maverick City Music)	Released: December 5, 2025; Label: Tribl Records; Format: Digital download, streaming	39	6
"—" denotes a recording that did not chart or was not released in that territory.

== Singles ==
=== As lead artist ===
List of singles and peak chart positions
Title	Year	Chart positions								Album
Title	Year	US Christ	US Christ Air	US Christ AC	US Christ Digital	US Gospel	US Gospel Air	US Gospel Digital	US Gospel Stream	Album
"Potter and Friend" (featuring Jesse Cline)	2017	—	—	—	—	—	—	—	—	Son of a Father
"The Giant Is Dead" (featuring Travis Greene)	2019	—	—	—	—	—	—	3	—	Non-album single
"Champion" (with Bethel Music)	2020	28	45	—	20	—	—	—	—	Revival's in the Air
"Don't Talk About It" (featuring Jesse Cline)	2020	—	—	—	—	—	—	—	—	Non-album singles
"Be Alright" (featuring Amanda Lindsey Cook)	2020	—	—	—	—	—	—	—	—	Non-album singles
"Voice of God" (featuring Steffany Gretzinger and Chandler Moore)	2020	36	—	—	22	—	—	—	—	Non-album singles
"Joyful"	2021	14	12	13	23	3	1	2	13	Circles
"See a Victory" (with Essential Worship)	2021	—	—	—	—	—	—	—	—	Part One
"Hollywood" (with the Apartment, Harolddd and Siri Worku)	2021	—	—	—	—	—	—	—	—	Non-album singles
"Something To Believe In" (featuring Kierra Sheard and the Apartment)	2021	—	—	—	—	—	—	—	—	Non-album singles
"I Love You" (with Judah. and Aaron Moses)	2021	—	—	—	—	—	—	—	—	Non-album singles
"God So Loved (Live)" (with We the Kingdom)	2021	—	—	—	—	—	—	—	—	Non-album singles
"Silent Night (Heavenly Peace)" (with We the Kingdom and Maverick City Music)	2021	—	24	12	10	—	—	—	—	A Family Christmas (EP)
"Cold Outside" (with the Apartment and Propaganda)	2022	—	—	—	—	—	—	—	—	Non-album single
"The Healing" (with Blanca)	2022	9	8	12	—	—	—	8	—	The Heartbreak and the Healing
"Nail Scarred Hands"	2022	—	—	—	—	—	—	—	—	Non-album single
"God Really Loves Us" (Crowder and Dante Bowe featuring Maverick City Music)	2022	3	3	4	—	1	—	—	2	Milk & Honey
"Hide Me"	2023	—	—	—	—	—	18	8	—	Dante Bowe
"Demons"	2023	—	—	—	—	—	—	—	—	Dante Bowe
"Wind Me Up" (with Anthony B)	2023	—	—	—	—	—	—	—	—	Non-album singles
"Gratefull" (with Fridayy)	2024	—	—	—	—	17	—	—	—	Non-album singles
"—" denotes a recording that did not chart

=== As featured artist ===
Title	Year	Album
"This Is That" (Eddie James featuring Dante Bowe & Michelle Danae)	2017	Pentecost
"Potter and Friend" (Tammi Haddon featuring Dante Bowe)	2020	Non-album single
"There Is a Power" (Rita Springer featuring Dante Bowe)	2020	Light
"Make Yourself at Home" (Legacy Worship featuring Dante Bowe)	2021	Non-album single
"Evidence (Live)" (Josh Baldwin featuring Dante Bowe)	2021	Non-album single
"Ways for Me" (Tribl featuring Dante Bowe)	2021	Tribl Nights Atlanta
"Welcome Home" (King Topher featuring Dante Bowe and Naomi Raine)	2022	Non-album single

== Promotional singles ==
=== As lead artist ===
Year	Song	Album
2020	"Anything Is Possible" (Bethel Music and Dante Bowe)	Revival's in the Air

=== As featured artist ===
List of songs and peak chart positions
Title	Year	Peak positions		Album
Title	Year	US Christ	US Gospel	Album
"Wait on You" (Elevation Worship and Maverick City Music featuring Dante Bowe and Chandler Moore)	2021	9	1	Old Church Basement
"Satisfied" (Evvie McKinney featuring Dante Bowe)	2022	—	—	Love, Evvie McKinney
"—" denotes a recording that did not chart.

== Other charted songs ==
List of songs and peak chart positions
Title	Year	Peak positions		Album
Title	Year	US Christ	US Gospel	Album
"Remember" (Maverick City Music and Upperroom featuring Dante Bowe and Eniola Abioye)	2020	49	25	You Hold It All Together (EP)
"Move Your Heart" (Maverick City Music and Upperroom featuring Dante Bowe and Elyssa Smith)	2021	36	15	Move Your Heart (EP)
"I Thank God" (Maverick City Music and Upperroom featuring Dante Bowe, Aaron Moses, Maryanne J. George and Chuck Butler)	2021	29	7	Move Your Heart (EP)
"Old Church Basement" (Elevation Worship and Maverick City Music featuring Dante Bowe)	2021	15	4	Old Church Basement
"Make It Right" (Maverick City Music featuring Dante Bowe, Todd Dulaney, Jekalyn Carr and Mav City Gospel Choir)	2021	47	24	Jubilee: Juneteenth Edition
"—" denotes a recording that did not chart.

== Other appearances ==
Year	Song	Album	Ref.
2016	"No Place I'd Rather Be: Set a Fire" (Eddie James and Ultimate Call featuring Dante Bowe)	Intimate	
2016	"Angels We Have Heard On High" (Eddie James featuring Dante Bowe, Jesse Cline, Aaron Moses & Joe L. Barnes)	Gloria: God Me and My Piano (Christmas Edition)	
2017	"Fell in Love" (Travis Greene featuring Dante Bowe)	Crossover: Live from Music City	
2018	"Mona Lisa" (Jor'dan Armstrong featuring Dante Bowe)	2 BLSD (EP)	
2018	"Only" (Addereth Worship featuring Dante Bowe)	Addereth Worship, Vol. I	
2018	"For Your Glory" (Addereth Worship featuring Dante Bowe)	Addereth Worship, Vol. I	
2018	"For Your Good" (Addereth Worship featuring Dante Bowe and Aaron Moses)	Addereth Worship, Vol. I	
2018	"Isaiah 6" (Addereth Worship featuring Dante Bowe)	Addereth Worship, Vol. I	
2018	"Peace Is a Promise You Keep" (Addereth Worship featuring Dante Bowe and Aaron Moses)	Addereth Worship, Vol. I	
2019	"Real Thing" (Maverick City Music featuring Dante Bowe)	Maverick City, Vol. 1 (EP)	
2019	"My Soul Sings" (Maverick City Music featuring Dante Bowe)	Maverick City, Vol. 1 (EP)	
2019	"Take Me Back" (Maverick City Music featuring Dante Bowe)	Maverick City, Vol. 2 (EP)	
2020	"The Blood" (Naomi Raine featuring Dante Bowe)	Back to Eden Pt. II	
2020	"The Blood (Reprise)" (Naomi Raine featuring Dante Bowe)	Back to Eden Pt. II	
2020	"The Blood (Radio Edit)" (Naomi Raine featuring Dante Bowe)	Back to Eden Pt. II	
2020	"He Paid It All" (Bri Babineaux featuring Dante Bowe)	The Encounter	
2020	"He Paid It All (Reprise)" (Bri Babineaux featuring Dante Bowe)	The Encounter	
2020	"Prepare the Way" (Bethel Music, Bethany Wohrle and Dante Bowe)	Revival's in the Air	
2020	"Mighty Glorious Jesus" (Ultimate Call featuring Dante Bowe)	Breathe	
2020	"Grace" (Ultimate Call featuring Dante Bowe)	Breathe	
2020	"O Mighty Ones" (Ultimate Call featuring Dante Bowe)	Breathe	
2020	"Spirit Break Out" (Ultimate Call featuring Dante Bowe and Michelle Danae)	Presence	
2020	"Holy Spirit" (Ultimate Call featuring Dante Bowe and Aaron Moses)	Presence	
2020	"Great Are You Lord" (Ultimate Call featuring Dante Bowe and Michelle Danae)	Presence	
2020	"Your Presence Is Heaven" (Ultimate Call featuring Dante Bowe)	Presence	
2020	"Lift You High" (Housefires featuring Kirby Kaple and Dante Bowe)	Housefires + Friends	
2020	"My Soul Sings" (Housefires featuring Kirby Kaple and Dante Bowe)	Housefires + Friends	
2020	"Surrounded (Fight My Battles)" (Dunamis Music featuring Gabriel Guedes de Almeida and Dante Bowe)	The Send Brasil (Ao Vivo)	
2020	"Isn't He Beautiful" (Rich Tolbert Jr. featuring Dante Bowe)	Never Be Defeated	
2020	"Hidden Forest Spicy Trail Mix" (Lael featuring Dante Bowe)	My Grocery List (EP)	
2020	"Outro (Remember)" (Maverick City Music and Upperroom featuring Dante Bowe and Eniola Abioye)	You Hold It All Together (EP)	
2021	"Son of Heaven" (Brandon Lake featuring Dante Bowe and Matt Maher)	House of Miracles (Live)	
2021	"I Need a Ghost" (Brandon Lake featuring Dante Bowe)	House of Miracles (Live)	
2021	"Everything Is Yours (Spontaneous)" (Maverick City Music and Upperroom featuring Dante Bowe, Elyssa Smith and Joel Figueroa)	Move Your Heart (EP)	
2021	"Testify" (Maverick City Music and Upperroom featuring Dante Bowe and Naomi Raine)	Jubilee (EP)	
2021	"Wait On You (Reprise)" (Elevation Worship and Maverick City Music featuring Dante Bowe and Chandler Moore)	Old Church Basement	
2021	"Nothing / Something" (Pat Barrett featuring Dante Bowe)	Nothing / Something	
2021	"Weathered" (Bethel Music, Dante Bowe and Hannah McClure)	Homecoming	
2021	"He Reigns (Spontaneous)" (Bethel Music and Dante Bowe)	Homecoming	
2021	"Ring and Robe (Welcome Home)" (Bethel Music and Dante Bowe featuring Naomi Raine)	Homecoming	
2021	"I’m Gonna Worship" (Maryanne J. George featuring Dante Bowe)	Not Just Stories	
2021	"Way Maker" (Bethel Music and Dante Bowe)	Peace, Vol. II	
2021	"Worthy (Spontaneous)" (Tribl featuring Dante Bowe)	Tribl Nights Atlanta	
2022	"Unity" (For King & Country and Dante Bowe)	What Are We Waiting For?	
2022	"Where Would I Be?" (Tribl and Maverick City Music featuring Dante Bowe, Ryan Ofei and Brandon Lake)	Tribl Nights Anthologies	
2022	"The One You Love" (Maverick City Music and Kirk Franklin featuring Brandon Lake, Dante Bowe and Chandler Moore)	Kingdom Book One	
2022	"Take Me Back" (Maverick City Music and Kirk Franklin featuring Dante Bowe, Chandler Moore and Ryan Ofei)	Kingdom Book One	
