= Rest on Us =

2021 song by Maverick City Music and Upperroom

Song by Maverick City Music and Upperroom featuring Brandon Lake and Eniola Abioye

from the EP Move Your Heart
- Released: January 29, 2021
- Recorded: 2020
- Venue: Upperroom, Dallas, Texas, U.S.
- Genre: Contemporary worship music; contemporary gospel
- Length: 5:37
- Label: Maverick City Music
- Songwriters: Brandon Lake; Tony Brown; Jonathan Jay; Harvest Parker; Rebekah White; Elyssa Smith
- Producers: Jonathan Jay; Tony Brown; Oscar Gamboa

Music video
- "Rest on Us" on YouTube

"Rest on Us" is a song performed by American contemporary worship groups Maverick City Music and Upperroom featuring Brandon Lake and Eniola Abioye. It was released by Tribl Records as the opening track on their collaborative extended play, Move Your Heart, on January 29, 2021. The song had been originally recorded and released by Harvest and Jon Thurlow on their collaborative album, There in the Middle (2020). The song was written by Brandon Lake, Elyssa Smith, Harvest Bashta, Jonathan Jay, Rebekah White, and Tony Brown. Jonathan Jay, Tony Brown, and Oscar Gamboa produced the song.

"Rest on Us" debuted at No. 36 on the US Hot Christian Songs chart, and No. 12 on the Hot Gospel Songs chart.

== Composition ==
"Rest on Us" is composed in the key of B♭ with a tempo of 72 beats per minute and a musical time signature of 4/4.

== Commercial performance ==
"Rest on Us" debuted at No. 39 on the US Hot Christian Songs, and No. 7 on the Hot Gospel Songs charts dated February 13, 2021, "Rest on Us" went on to peak at No. 36 on the Hot Christian Songs chart and spent a total of twenty-four non-consecutive weeks, and at No. 12 on the Hot Gospel Songs chart spending a total of twenty-six non-consecutive weeks.

== Music video ==
Tribl released the official music video of "Rest on Us" featuring Brandon Lake and Eniola Abioye leading the song at Upperroom, Dallas, Texas, through their YouTube channel on February 5, 2021.

== Charts ==
=== Weekly charts ===
Weekly chart performance for "Rest on Us"
Chart (2021)	Peak position
US Hot Christian Songs (Billboard)	36
US Christian Airplay (Billboard)	38
US Gospel Songs (Billboard)	12

=== Year-end charts ===
Year-end chart performance for "Rest on Us"
Chart (2021)	Position
US Gospel Songs (Billboard)	43

== Certifications ==
Region	Certification	Certified units/sales
United States (RIAA)	Gold	500,000^{‡}
^{‡} Sales+streaming figures based on certification alone.

== Elle Limebear version ==
"Rest on Us"

Single by Elle Limebear
- Released: June 17, 2022
- Genre: Contemporary worship music
- Length: 5:25; 3:44 (single version)
- Label: Provident Label Group
- Songwriters: Brandon Lake; Tony Brown; Jonathan Jay; Harvest Parker; Rebekah White; Elyssa Smith
- Producer: David Leonard

Elle Limebear singles chronology
"Thank You, Sorry, Please" (2022)	"Rest on Us" (2022)	"Never-Ending Love" (2022)

Music video
- "Rest on Us" on YouTube

Elle Limebear released a studio-recorded version of "Rest on Us" as a single on June 17, 2022.

=== Composition ===
Limebear's version is composed in the key of F with a tempo of 74 beats per minute and a musical time signature of 4/4.

=== Commercial performance ===
Limebear's version of "Rest on Us" debuted at No. 38 on the US Christian Airplay chart dated July 23, 2022.

Limebear's version made its debut at No. 48 on the US Hot Christian Songs chart dated August 27, 2022.

=== Music videos ===
On June 17, 2022, the official music video for "Rest on Us" by Elle Limebear was published on her YouTube channel.

=== Track listing ===
"Rest on Us"
No.	Title	Length
1.	"Rest on Us"	5:25
2.	"Rest on Us" (Single Version)	3:44
Total length:		9:09

=== Charts ===
Weekly chart performance for "Rest on Us"
Chart (2022)	Peak position
US Christian Songs (Billboard)	48
US Christian Airplay (Billboard)	36

=== Release history ===
Region	Date	Format	Label	Ref.
Various	June 17, 2022	Digital download; streaming	Provident Label Group	
United States	July 8, 2022	Christian radio	Provident Label Group	

== Other versions ==
- Upperroom released their rendition of the song with Elyssa Smith on their live album, Land of the Living (2020).
- Tribl and Maverick City Music released a version of the song featuring Mariah Adigun and Jekalyn Carr on their collaborative live album, Tribl Nights Anthologies (2022).
