= Too Good to Not Believe =

2021 song by Brandon Lake and Bethel Music

Single by Brandon Lake and Bethel Music

from the album Homecoming
- Released: May 21, 2021
- Recorded: 2021
- Venue: Redding Civic Auditorium, Redding, California, U.S.
- Genre: Contemporary worship music
- Length: 10:33 (live version); 4:25 (radio version)
- Label: Bethel Music
- Songwriters: Brandon Lake; Chris Davenport; Cody Carnes; Josh Silverberg
- Producer: David Whitworth

Brandon Lake singles chronology
"Just Like Heaven" (2020)	"Too Good to Not Believe" (2021)	"I See You" (2021)

Bethel Music singles chronology
"Touch of Heaven / Alabaster Heart" (2021)	"Too Good to Not Believe" (2021)

Radio version
- Radio version featuring Jenn Johnson

Jenn Johnson singles chronology
"Joy Invincible" (2020)	"Too Good to Not Believe (Radio Version)" (2021)

Music videos
- "Too Good to Not Believe" (Live) on YouTube
- "Too Good to Not Believe" (Lyrics) on YouTube

"Too Good to Not Believe" is a song by Brandon Lake and Bethel Music, which was released on May 21, 2021, as the lead single to Bethel Music's thirteenth live album, Homecoming (2021). The song was written by Lake, Chris Davenport, Cody Carnes, and Josh Silverberg. David Whitworth handled the production of the single.

"Too Good to Not Believe" peaked at number 17 on the US Hot Christian Songs chart published by Billboard.

== Background ==
On May 14, 2021, Bethel Music released the music video of "Too Good to Not Believe" with Brandon Lake on YouTube. Lake and Bethel Music officially released the song as a single on May 21, 2021. On September 10, 2021, Lake alongside Jenn Johnson released the radio version of "Too Good to Not Believe".

== Writing and development ==
Brandon Lake shared the story behind the song, saying it came out of a conversation between Cody Carnes, Chris Davenport and him about the miracles they had seen. Lake shared that while Joshua Silverberg was not present when they had written the song, he was credited on account of being an inspiration to them for the number of healings he had seen. Lake quoted Silverberg saying "God heals because he loves. It's in his nature, it's in his character. It's what he does, and he's never stopped healing."

== Composition ==
"Too Good to Not Believe" is composed in the key of C with a tempo of 72 beats per minute and a musical time signature of 4/4.

== Commercial performance ==
"Too Good to Not Believe" debuted at No. 33 on the US Hot Christian Songs chart dated June 5, 2021, concurrently charting at No. 7 on the Christian Digital Song Sales chart.

"Too Good to Not Believe" debuted at number 50 on the US Christian Airplay chart dated October 30, 2021.

== Music videos ==
Bethel Music released the live music video of "Too Good to Not Believe" with Brandon Lake leading the song at Bethel Church through their YouTube channel on May 14, 2021. On September 24, 2021, Bethel Music released the official lyric video of the song on YouTube.

== Track listing ==
"Too Good to Not Believe (Live)"
No.	Title	Producer	Length
1.	"Too Good to Not Believe" (with Bethel Music; Live)	David Whitworth	10:33

"Too Good to Not Believe" (Radio Version)
No.	Title	Producer	Length
1.	"Too Good to Not Believe" (with Jenn Johnson; Radio Version)	Jacob Sooter	4:25

== Charts ==
=== Weekly charts ===
Weekly chart performance for "Too Good to Not Believe"
Chart (2021–2022)	Peak position
US Hot Christian Songs (Billboard)	17
US Christian Airplay (Billboard)	14
US Christian AC (Billboard)	22

=== Year-end charts ===
Year-end chart performance for "Too Good to Not Believe"
Chart (2022)	Position
US Christian Songs (Billboard)	50
US Christian Airplay (Billboard)	44

== Release history ==
Release history and formats of "Too Good to Not Believe"
Region	Date	Version	Format	Label	Ref.
Various	May 21, 2021	Live (with Bethel Music)	Digital download; streaming	Bethel Music	
Various	September 10, 2021	Radio (with Jenn Johnson)	Digital download; streaming	Bethel Music	
United States	October 8, 2021	Radio (with Jenn Johnson)	Christian radio	Bethel Music	

== Cody Carnes and Brandon Lake version ==
"Too Good to Not Believe"

Single by Cody Carnes and Brandon Lake

from the album God Is Good!
- Released: May 28, 2021
- Genre: Contemporary worship music
- Length: 5:32
- Label: Sparrow; Capitol CMG
- Songwriters: Brandon Lake; Chris Davenport; Cody Carnes; Josh Silverberg
- Producer: Austin Davis

Cody Carnes singles chronology
"The Blessing" (2020)	"Too Good to Not Believe" (2021)	"Hope of the Ages" (2021)

Music video
- "Too Good to Not Believe" (Live) on YouTube

Cody Carnes and Brandon Lake released a studio-recorded version of "Too Good to Not Believe" as a single on May 28, 2021.

=== Accolades ===
Year-end lists
Publication	Accolade	Rank	Ref.
365 Days Of Inspiring Media	Top 50 Songs of 2021	32	

=== Commercial performance ===
"Too Good to Not Believe" debuted at number 44 on the US Christian Airplay chart. The song went on to peak at number 43 and has spent a total of three consecutive weeks on the chart.

"Too Good to Not Believe" debuted at No. 45 on the US Hot Christian Songs chart dated February 1, 2022.

=== Music videos ===
On May 28, 2021, the audio video of "Too Good to Not Believe" was published on Cody Carnes's YouTube channel, as well as the live performance video of the song.

=== Track listing ===
"Too Good to Not Believe"
No.	Title	Length
1.	"Too Good to Not Believe"	5:32

"Too Good to Not Believe (Live)"
No.	Title	Length
1.	"Too Good to Not Believe" (Live)	9:45

"Too Good to Not Believe (Live)" — Apple Music bonus video content
No.	Title	Length
2.	"Too Good to Not Believe" (Live in Tulsa, OK/2021)	9:42
Total length:		19:27

=== Personnel ===
Studio version credits adapted from AllMusic.

- Dan Alber — bass
- Cody Carnes — primary artist, vocals
- Chad Chrisman — A&R
- Austin Davis — drums, producer, programmer
- Garrett Davis — A&R
- Sam Gibson — mastering engineer, mixing
- Brandon Lake — primary artist, vocals
- Casey Moore — acoustic guitar, electric guitar
- Micah Nichols — vocal engineer
- Skye Reedy — background vocals
- Aaron Robertson — keyboards, programmer
- Sam Westhoff — vocal engineer

Live version credits adapted from AllMusic.

- Dan Alber — bass
- Tyler Carino — assistant engineer
- Cody Carnes — acoustic guitar, primary artist, producer, vocals
- Chad Chrisman — A&R
- Austin Davis — producer, programmer
- Garrett Davis — A&R
- Sam Gibson — mastering engineer, mixing
- Kari Jobe — background vocals
- Casey Moore — electric guitar
- Jack Nellis — vocal engineer
- Aaron Robertson — programmer
- Jessica Sheppard — keyboards
- Bobby Strand — electric guitar, keyboards
- Joe Volk — drums

=== Charts ===
Weekly chart performance for "Too Good to Not Believe"
Chart (2021-2022)	Peak position
US Hot Christian Songs (Billboard)	45
US Christian Airplay (Billboard)	40

=== Release history ===
Region	Date	Version	Format	Label	Ref.
Various	May 28, 2021	Studio (with Brandon Lake)	Digital download; streaming	Sparrow Records; Capitol Christian Music Group	
Various	June 18, 2021	Live (Cody Carnes only)	Digital download; streaming	Sparrow Records; Capitol Christian Music Group	

== Other versions ==
- Tribl and Maverick City Music released their live version of the song featuring Lizzie Morgan, Cecily, and Melvin Crispell III, as a promotional single from their album, Tribl Nights Anthologies (2022).
