= Tribl Nights Atlanta =

2021 live album by Tribl

Live album by Tribl
- Released: November 12, 2021
- Genre: Contemporary worship music; contemporary gospel
- Length: 113:05
- Label: Tribl
- Producer: Jonathan Jay; Tony Brown

Tribl chronology
Tribl I (2021)	Tribl Nights Atlanta (2021)	Tribl Nights Anthologies (2022)

Singles from Tribl Nights Atlanta
- 1. "Ways for Me" / "We Have Hope" Released: October 29, 2021

Tribl Nights Atlanta is the second live album by American contemporary worship groups Tribl. The album was released on November 12, 2021, via Tribl Records. The featured worship leaders on the album are Dante Bowe, Mariah Adigun, Ryan Ofei, Joe L Barnes, Jekalyn Carr, Tianna Horsey, Jonathan Traylor, Lizzie Morgan, Montel Moore, Doe, Melvin Crispell III, and Chandler Moore. The album was produced by Tony Brown and Jonathan Jay.

Tribl Nights Atlanta debuted at number 46 on Billboard's Top Christian Albums Chart and at number six Top Gospel Albums Chart in the United States. The album won the GMA Dove Award for Gospel Worship Album of the Year at the 2022 GMA Dove Awards.

== Background ==
Tribl Nights Atlanta is a live album recorded during the Tribl Worship Night event series in Atlanta. The album is a collection containing new recordings and cover songs, closing with a sermonette delivered by Chandler Moore.

== Release and promotion ==
Tribl released "Ways for Me" featuring Dante Bowe as the lead single from the album on October 29, 2021. Tribl also released "We Have Hope" featuring Joe L Barnes, Jonathan Traylor and Lizzie Morgan as the second single from the album on the same day.

== Accolades ==
Awards
Year	Organization	Award	Result	Ref
2022	GMA Dove Awards	Gospel Worship Album of the Year	Won	

== Commercial performance ==
In the United States, Tribl Nights Atlanta debuted at number ten on the Top Christian Albums Chart, and at number three the Top Gospel Albums Chart, dated November 27, 2021.

== Track listing ==
Tribl Nights Atlanta — Standard edition
No.	Title	Writer(s)	Length
1.	"Worthy (Spontaneous)" (featuring Dante Bowe)	Dante Bowe	8:51
2.	"Ways for Me" (featuring Dante Bowe)	Bowe; Aaron Moses; Tywan Mack	12:16
3.	"Rumors" (featuring Ryan Ofei, Mariah Adigun and Joe L Barnes)	Emmy Rose; Hank Bentley; Julissa Leilani; Patrick Mayberry	10:34
4.	"Build My Life" (featuring Joe L Barnes, Ryan Ofei and Jekalyn Carr)	Brett Younker; Karl Martin; Kirby Kaple; Matt Redman; Pat Barrett	11:45
5.	"Moving" (featuring Tianna Horsey, Ryan Ofei and Joe L Barnes)	Blake Wiggins; Nate Diaz; Ryan Ofei; Tianna Horsey	11:20
6.	"We Have Hope" (featuring Joe L Barnes, Jonathan Traylor and Lizzie Morgan)	Bowe; Bowe; Joe L Barnes; Nate Moore; Timothy Reddick	8:29
7.	"New Wine" (featuring Montel Moore and Doe)	Brooke Ligertwood	9:39
8.	"Never Lost" (featuring Joe L Barnes, Lizzie Morgan and Melvin Crispell III)	Catherine Mullins; Rita Springer	13:14
9.	"Not Better, Just Different" (featuring Chandler Moore)	Chandler Moore	26:57
Total length:			113:05

Tribl Nights Atlanta — Apple Music bonus video content
No.	Title	Length
1.	"Worthy (Spontaneous)" (featuring Dante Bowe)	8:51
2.	"Ways for Me" (featuring Dante Bowe)	12:16
3.	"Rumors" (featuring Ryan Ofei, Mariah Adigun and Joe L Barnes)	10:34
4.	"Build My Life" (featuring Joe L Barnes, Ryan Ofei and Jekalyn Carr)	11:53
5.	"Moving" (featuring Tianna Horsey, Ryan Ofei and Joe L Barnes)	11:21
6.	"We Have Hope" (featuring Joe L Barnes, Jonathan Traylor and Lizzie Morgan)	8:28
7.	"New Wine" (featuring Montel Moore and Doe)	9:40
8.	"Never Lost" (featuring Joe L Barnes, Lizzie Morgan and Melvin Crispell III)	13:15
9.	"Not Better, Just Different" (featuring Chandler Moore)	27:00

== Charts ==
=== Weekly charts ===
Weekly chart performance for Tribl Nights Atlanta
Chart (2021)	Peak position
US Top Christian Albums (Billboard)	46
US Gospel Albums (Billboard)	6

=== Year-end charts ===
Year-end chart performance for Tribl Nights Atlanta
Chart (2022)	Position
US Gospel Albums (Billboard)	44

== Release history ==
Release history for Tribl Nights Atlanta
Region	Date	Format(s)	Label(s)	Ref.
Various	November 12, 2021	Digital download; streaming	Tribl Records	
