= Jubilee (Maverick City Music album) =

2021 EP by Maverick City Music

Live album by Maverick City Music
- Released: February 26, 2021
- Recorded: 2020
- Studio: 1971 Sounds, Atlanta, Georgia, U.S.
- Genre: Contemporary worship music; contemporary gospel
- Length: 69:17
- Label: Tribl
- Producer: Jonathan Jay; Tony Brown

Maverick City Music chronology
Move Your Heart (2020)	Jubilee (2021)	Como En El Cielo (2021)

Jubilee is the fourth live album American contemporary worship music collective Maverick City Music. It was initially released on February 24, 2021, via Tribl Records, as an exclusive to Tribl App customers. The album was made available to other streaming platforms on February 26, 2021. The featured worship leaders on the album are Naomi Raine, Bryan & Katie Torwalt, Maryanne J. George, Chandler Moore, Nicole Binion, Ryan Ofei, Joe L Barnes, Nate Moore, and Dante Bowe. The EP was produced by Jonathan Jay and Tony Brown.

Jubilee debuted at No. 14 on Billboard's Top Christian Albums Chart and No. 2 on Top Gospel Albums Chart.

== Background ==
Naomi Raine of Maverick City Music shared in an interview with Worship Musician Magazine that Jubilee is a collection of songs dedicated to Spirituals, which were the origins and start of Gospel music. Raine also shared the vision behind the album, saying:

As Christians we call people into our Jubilee, because Christ is our freedom from all types of slavery. It was just an ode to what the Lord has done in the Gospel music community and through gospel music, and setting folks free.

== Release and promotion ==
On February 22, 2021, Maverick City Music released the music video for "Jubilee" featuring Naomi Raine and Bryan & Katie Torwalt on YouTube. Maverick City Music also announced that Jubilee will be released on Tribl App exclusively on February 24, 2021, with the release to other streaming platforms being slated for February 26, 2021. On February 23, 2021, Maverick City Music released the music video for "Ruins" featuring Joe L Barnes and Nate Moore on YouTube. On February 24, 2021, Maverick City Music released the music video for "God of Israel" featuring Naomi Raine and Maryanne J. George on YouTube, with Jubilee being availed for streaming on Tribl App. On February 26, 2021, Maverick City Music released Jubilee to other streaming platforms, and published the music video for "The Blood Is Still the Blood" featuring Chandler Moore, Nicole Binion and Ryan Ofei, on YouTube.

== Commercial performance ==
In the United States, Jubilee debuted at No. 14 on Top Christian Albums and No. 2 on Top Gospel Albums charts dated March 13, 2021, having earned 2,000 equivalent album units in its first week of sales.

== Track listing ==
Jubilee
No.	Title	Writer(s)	Length
1.	"Jubilee" (featuring Naomi Raine, Bryan & Katie Torwalt)	Naomi Raine; Katie Torwalt; Bryan Torwalt	8:51
2.	"God of Israel" (featuring Naomi Raine and Maryanne J. George)	Raine; Maryanne J. George; Adele Jackson	9:17
3.	"The Blood Is Still the Blood" (featuring Chandler Moore, Nicole Binion and Ryan Ofei)	Chandler Moore; Tasha Cobbs Leonard; Kenneth Leonard; Jonathan Jay; Kirby Kaple; Daniel Bashta; Taylor Hill	10:03
4.	"The Blood Is Still the Blood Reprise" (featuring Chandler Moore, Nicole Binion and Ryan Ofei)	C. Moore; Hill; K. Leonard; Jay; Bashta; Kaple; T. C. Leonard	13:08
5.	"Ruins" (featuring Joe L Barnes and Nate Moore)	Joe L Barnes; Nate Moore; David Leonard; Benji Cowart; Lucas Cortazio; Ben Cantelon	4:12
6.	"Testify" (featuring Dante Bowe and Naomi Raine)	Dante Bowe; Jay; Steffany Gretzinger; N. Moore	7:25
7.	"Hymn Medley" (featuring Chandler Moore)	Thomas Chisholm; William M. Runyan; Louisa M.R. Stead; Horatio Spafford; Philip Bliss	16:21
Total length:			69:17

- "Hymn Medley" is a medley of the hymns "Great Is Thy Faithfulness," "'Tis So Sweet to Trust in Jesus," and "It Is Well."

== Charts ==
=== Weekly charts ===
Weekly chart performance for Jubilee
Chart (2021)	Peak position
US Top Christian Albums (Billboard)	14
US Top Current Album Sales (Billboard)	99
US Top Gospel Albums (Billboard)	2

=== Year-end charts ===
Year-end chart performance for Jubilee
Chart (2021)	Position
US Gospel Albums (Billboard)	26

== Release history ==
Region	Date	Format(s)	Label(s)	Ref.
Various	February 24, 2021 (Tribl App exclusive)	Streaming	Tribl Records	
Various	February 26, 2021	Digital download; streaming	Tribl Records	
