= A Very Maverick Christmas =

2021 live album by Maverick City Music

Live album by Maverick City Music
- Released: November 30, 2021
- Venue: Paradise Baptist Church, Atlanta, Georgia, U.S.
- Genre: Contemporary worship; contemporary gospel; Christmas music
- Length: 118:05
- Label: Tribl
- Producer: Tony Brown; Jonathan Jay; Brandon Lake

Maverick City Music chronology
Venga Tu Reino (2021)	A Very Maverick Christmas (2021)	Breathe (2022)

Singles from A Very Maverick Christmas
- 1. "Mary Did You Know?" Released: November 25, 2022

A Very Maverick Christmas is the eighth live album by American contemporary worship music collective Maverick City Music, which was released via Tribl Records on November 30, 2021. The album contains guest appearances by Naomi Raine, Todd Galberth, Kim Walker-Smith, Chandler Moore, Melvin Crispell III, Isaac Carree, Lizzie Morgan, Brandon Lake, Phil Wickham, Ryan Ofei, Tianna Horsey, and Natalie Grant. The album was produced by Tony Brown, Jonathan Jay, and Brandon Lake.

The album was promoted with the release of "Mary Did You Know?" as a single. "Mary Did You Know?" peaked at number 23 on the Hot Christian Songs chart and number 11 on the Hot Gospel Songs chart.

A Very Maverick Christmas became a commercially successful album since its release, peaking at number nine on Billboard's Top Christian Albums Chart and at number three Top Gospel Albums Chart in the United States, as well as number five on the Official Charts' Official Christian & Gospel Albums Chart in the United Kingdom. A Very Maverick Christmas received a GMA Dove Award nomination for Christmas / Special Event Album of the Year at the 2022 GMA Dove Awards.

== Background ==
On November 30, 2021, Maverick City Music released A Very Maverick Christmas via Tribl Records, being their second Christmas-themed release following Maverick City Christmas (2020). The album was recorded live at Paradise Baptist Church in Atlanta, Georgia, said to have been started by a slave.

== Singles ==
"Mary Did You Know?" impacted Christian radio in the United States on November 25, 2022, becoming the first single from the album. Maverick City Music released the radio version of "Mary Did You Know?" On December 2, 2022. "Mary Did You Know?" peaked at number 23 on the US Hot Christian Songs chart, and number 11 on the Hot Gospel Songs chart.

== Reception ==
=== Critical response ===
Professional ratings
Review scores
Source	Rating
The Christian Beat	4/5

In a favourable review for The Christian Beat, Jessie Clarks opined "The full project brings a nice blend of worship and original tracks mixed with remakes and arrangements of traditional holiday hymns."

=== Accolades ===
Awards
Year	Organization	Award	Result	Ref
2022	GMA Dove Awards	Christmas / Special Event Album of the Year	Nominated	

== Commercial performance ==
In the United States, A Very Maverick Christmas debuted at number eleven on the Top Christian Albums Chart and number three on Top Gospel Albums Chart.

In the United Kingdom, A Very Maverick Christmas debuted on the OCC's Official Christian & Gospel Albums Chart at number five.

== Track listing ==
A Very Maverick Christmas
No.	Title	Writer(s)	Length
1.	"Opening Prayer / We've Come to Adore You" (featuring Naomi Raine, Todd Galberth and Mav City Gospel Choir)	John Francis Wade; St. Claire Adams	7:31
2.	"Joy to the World / Joy of the Lord" (featuring Naomi Raine, Todd Galberth and Mav City Gospel Choir)	Brandon Lake; Dante Bowe; George Frideric Handel; Isaac Watts; Jonathan Jay; Naomi Raine; Kalley	10:32
3.	"Away in a Manger / Worthy is Your Name" (featuring Kim Walker-Smith, Chandler Moore and Mav City Gospel Choir)	Chris Brown; Frederick Whitfield; John Thomas McFarland; Mack Brock; Martin Luther; Steven Furtick; William J. Kirkpatrick	7:42
4.	"Go Tell It on the Mountain" (featuring Melvin Crispell III, Chandler Moore and Mav City Gospel Choir)	Lake; John W. Work Jr.	6:52
5.	"Gonna Tell Somebody (Spontaneous)" (featuring Melvin Crispell III, Isaac Carree, Lizzie Morgan, Chandler Moore and Mav City Gospel Choir)	Lake; Work Jr.	3:52
6.	"Mary Did You Know?" (featuring Chandler Moore, Lizzie Morgan and Mav City Gospel Choir)	Buddy Greene; Mark Lowry	8:24
7.	"Forever and Ever Amen" (featuring Brandon Lake, Phil Wickham and Mav City Gospel Choir)	Lake; Wickham	10:15
8.	"Silent Night / Jesus We Love You" (featuring Brandon Lake, Phil Wickham, Kim Walker-Smith and Mav City Gospel Choir)	Franz Xaver Gruber; Hannah McClure; Joseph Mohr; Kalley; Paul McClure	9:12
9.	"King of Kings / Angels We Have Heard on High" (featuring Naomi Raine, Kim Walker-Smith and Mav City Gospel Choir)	Brooke Ligertwood; James Chadwick; Jason Ingram; Scott Ligertwood	7:11
10.	"Revelation 19: 1" (featuring Naomi Raine and Mav City Gospel Choir)	Jeffrey La Valley	6:41
11.	"Joyful Joyful We Adore Thee" (featuring Ryan Ofei, Tianna Horsey and Mav City Gospel Choir)	Henry Van Dyke	3:05
12.	"Gratitude / Worthy of it All / You're Worthy of My Praise" (featuring Brandon Lake, Natalie Grant and Mav City Gospel Choir)	Lake; Bowe; Benjamin Hastings; David Brymer; David Ruis; Ryan Hall	13:12
13.	"Best Part" (featuring Naomi Raine, Chandler Moore & Mav City Gospel Choir)	G. Morris Coleman; Raine	5:35
14.	"Here I Am to Worship (More Than Life)" (featuring Ryan Ofei and Mav City Gospel Choir)	Harold Brown; Jason McGee; Ryan Ofei; Tim Hughes	4:41
15.	"Noel" (featuring Lizzie Morgan and Mav City Gospel Choir)	Chris Tomlin; Ed Cash; Matt Redman	7:00
16.	"O Holy Night" (featuring Melvin Crispell III and Mav City Gospel Choir)	Adolphe Charles Adam; John Sullivan Dwight; Placide Cappeau	6:19
Total length:			118:05

== Charts ==
=== Weekly charts ===
Weekly chart performance for A Very Maverick Christmas
Chart (2021)	Peak position
UK Christian & Gospel Albums (OCC)	5
US Top Christian Albums (Billboard)	9
US Top Gospel Albums (Billboard)	3

=== Year-end charts ===
Year-end chart performance for A Very Maverick Christmas
Chart (2022)	Position
US Christian Albums (Billboard)	72
US Gospel Albums (Billboard)	25
Chart (2023)	Position
US Gospel Albums (Billboard)	40
Chart (2025)	Position
US Gospel Albums (Billboard)	34

== Release history ==
Release history and formats for A Very Maverick Christmas
Region	Date	Format(s)	Label(s)	Ref.
Various	November 30, 2021	Digital download; streaming	Tribl Records	
