= Tribl I =

2021 live album by Tribl and Maverick City Music

Live album by Tribl and Maverick City Music
- Released: July 23, 2021
- Recorded: April 2021
- Genre: Contemporary worship music; contemporary gospel
- Length: 76:23
- Label: Tribl
- Producer: Jonathan Jay; Tony Brown; Brandon Lake

Tribl chronology
Tribl I (2021)	Tribl Nights Atlanta (2021)

Maverick City Music chronology
Jubilee: Juneteenth Edition (2021)	Tribl I (2021)	Venga Tu Reino (2021)

Tribl I is a collaborative live album by American contemporary worship groups Tribl and Maverick City Music. The album was released on July 23, 2021, via Tribl Records. The featured worship leaders on the album are Chandler Moore, Siri Worku, Ryan Ofei, Mariah Adigun, Naomi Raine, Brandon Lake, Tianna Horsey, Aaron Moses, Cecily, Joe L Barnes, Jessica Hitte and Montel Moore. The album was produced by Brandon Lake, Tony Brown, and Jonathan Jay.

Tribl I became a commercially successful album upon its release, debuting at number ten on Billboard's Top Christian Albums Chart and at number three Top Gospel Albums Chart in the United States.

== Background ==
Tribl I is a collaborative live album marking the debut of Tribl, performing alongside Maverick City Music. The album was recorded in April 2021 in Atlanta, Georgia during a live worship night. Ryan Ofei of Tribl spoke of the album, saying:

This collaborative project is so significant to me because it represents a prayer that was answered beyond my request. To join with family from across the world and worship our Saviour is truly a heaven-like experience.

== Release and promotion ==
On May 28, 2021, Tribl released their debut promotional single, "Still Holy" featuring Ryan Oféi and Naomi Raine, announcing that they will release their debut collaborative album with Maverick City Music titled Tribl I, initially slated for June 11, 2021, availing it for digital pre-order.

== Commercial performance ==
In the United States, Tribl I debuted at number ten on the Top Christian Albums Chart, and at number three the Top Gospel Albums Chart, dated August 7, 2021.

== Track listing ==
Tribl I
No.	Title	Writer(s)	Length
1.	"Prepare the Way" (featuring Chandler Moore and Siri Worku)	Chandler Moore; Siri Worku	7:14
2.	"High Praise" (featuring Ryan Ofei and Mariah Adigun)	Brandon Lake; Dante Bowe; Melodie Wagner	8:42
3.	"Still Holy" (featuring Naomi Raine and Ryan Ofei)	Lake; Aaron Roberts; Jonathan Jay; Morgan Saulsberry; Ryan Ofei; Will Thomas; Zinzile Sibanda	8:27
4.	"Better" (featuring Brandon Lake and Tianna Horsey)	Harold Brown; Tianna Horsey	8:14
5.	"Rumors" (featuring Aaron Moses and Mariah Adigun)	Emmy Rose; Hank Bentley; Julissa Leilani; Patrick Mayberry	9:08
6.	"I Love to Sing About It" (featuring Cecily)	Bowe; Elyssa Smith; Jay; Robby Busick	6:43
7.	"Come & Move" (featuring Ryan Ofei, Joe L Barnes and Mariah Adigun)	Bowe; Alton Eugene; C. Moore; Omari Walthour	9:20
8.	"Grave Clothes" (featuring Jessica Hitte and Montel Moore)	Drew Scott; Jessica Hitte; Leilani; Kayla Yvonne Thompson; Kimberly Onyia; LeBron Arnwine; Melody Adorno; Michelle Marie Mateo	5:26
9.	"Promised Land" (featuring Cecily)	Nathan Jess; Sean Curran; Stefan Cashwell	5:32
10.	"Love Sick" (featuring Chandler Moore and Siri Worku)	C. Moore; Smith; Kirby Kaple; Steffany Gretzinger	9:34
Total length:			76:23

== Charts ==
=== Weekly charts ===
Weekly chart performance for Tribl I
Chart (2021)	Peak position
US Top Christian Albums (Billboard)	10
US Gospel Albums (Billboard)	3

=== Year-end charts ===
Year-end chart performance for Tribl I
Chart (2021)	Position
US Gospel Albums (Billboard)	29

== Release history ==
Release history for Tribl I
Region	Date	Format(s)	Label(s)	Ref.
Various	July 23, 2021	Digital download; streaming	Tribl Records	
