= Tribl Nights Anthologies =

2022 live album by Tribl and Maverick City Music

Live album by Tribl and Maverick City Music
- Released: April 29, 2022
- Genre: Contemporary worship music; contemporary gospel
- Length: 168:48
- Label: Tribl
- Producer: Jonathan Jay; Tony Brown

Tribl chronology
Tribl Nights Atlanta (2021)	Tribl Nights Anthologies (2022)

Maverick City Music chronology
Breathe (2022)	Tribl Nights Anthologies (2022)	Simple Adoración (2022)

Tribl Nights Anthologies is a collaborative live album by American contemporary worship groups Tribl and Maverick City Music. The album was released on April 29, 2022, via Tribl Records. The album features appearances by Lizzie Morgan, Cecily, Melvin Crispell III, Ryan Ofei, Joe L Barnes, Dante Bowe, Jonathan Traylor, Doe, Jekalyn Carr, JJ Hairston, Amanda Cook, Brandon Lake, Mariah Adigun, Nate Diaz, Katie Torwalt, and Sam Collier. The album was produced by Tony Brown and Jonathan Jay.

Tribl Nights Anthologies debuted at number 41 on Billboard's Top Christian Albums chart and at number six Top Gospel Albums chart in the United States.

== Background ==
Tribl and Maverick City Music announced that they will release a new album titled Tribl Nights Anthologies on April 29, 2022. Tribl Nights Anthologies is a collection of songs and sermons by traditional gospel and CCM artists who would not usually gather together in a room, which was recorded during a live worship series in the summer of 2021. The album features Lizzie Morgan, Cecily, Melvin Crispell III, Ryan Ofei, Joe L Barnes, Dante Bowe, Jonathan Traylor, Doe, Jekalyn Carr, JJ Hairston, Amanda Cook, Brandon Lake, Mariah Adigun, Nate Diaz, Katie Torwalt, and Sam Collier.

== Release and promotion ==
On March 25, 2022, Tribl and Maverick City Music released their first promotional single from the album, "Too Good to Not Believe" featuring Lizzie Morgan, Cecily and Melvin Crispell III, availing the album for digital pre-order.

On March 25, 2022, Tribl and Maverick City Music released their second promotional single from the album, "King of Heaven (Reign Jesus Reign)" featuring Ryan Ofei, Nate Diaz and Lizzie Morgan.

== Commercial performance ==
In the United States, Tribl Nights Anthologies debuted at number 41 on the Top Christian Albums chart, and at number six on the Top Gospel Albums chart, dated May 14, 2022.

== Track listing ==
Tribl Nights Anthologies — Disc 1
No.	Title	Writer(s)	Length
1.	"Too Good to Not Believe" (featuring Lizzie Morgan, Melvin Crispell III and Cecily)	Brandon Lake; Chris Davenport; Cody Carnes; Josh Silverburg	8:38
2.	"Be Praised" (featuring Ryan Ofei and Joe L Barnes)	Aaron Moses; Dante Bowe; Joe L Barnes	7:01
3.	"Ways for Me" (featuring Dante Bowe)	Bowe; Aaron Moses; Tywan Mack	12:16
4.	"We Have Hope" (featuring Joe L Barnes, Jonathan Traylor and Lizzie Morgan)	Bowe; Joe L Barnes; Nate Moore; Timothy Reddick	8:29
5.	"Canvas & Clay (King of My Heart)" (featuring Doe and Jonathan Traylor)	Ben Smith; Chris Tomlin; Pat Barrett	8:43
6.	"Never Lost" (featuring Joe L Barnes, Lizzie Morgan and Melvin Crispell III)	Catherine Mullins; Rita Springer	13:14
7.	"Build My Life" (featuring Joe L Barnes, Ryan Ofei and Jekalyn Carr)	Brett Younker; Karl Martin; Kirby Kaple; Matt Redman; Pat Barrett	11:45
8.	"Don’t Take Your Spirit from Me" (featuring J.J. Hairston)	J.J. Hairston	19:43

Tribl Nights Anthologies — Disc 2
No.	Title	Writer(s)	Length
1.	"If It Wasn't for Jesus (Spontaneous)" (featuring Amanda Cook)	Amanda Cook	3:29
2.	"Names (He Shall Reign)" (featuring Amanda Cook)	Jason Ingram; Cook; Tiffany Hammer	9:31
3.	"Where Would I Be?" (featuring Dante Bowe, Ryan Ofei and Brandon Lake)	Moses; Lake; Bowe; Demond Reed; Grace Marr; Ryan Ofei	8:08
4.	"Rest on Us" (featuring Mariah Adigun and Jekalyn Carr)	Lake; Elyssa Smith; Harvest Bashta; Jonathan Jay; Rebekah White; Tony Brown	6:40
5.	"King of Heaven (Reign Jesus Reign)" (featuring Ryan Ofei, Nate Diaz and Lizzie Morgan)	Nate Diaz; Robert Cameron; Ofei; Thomas Ken	9:55
6.	"King of Heaven (Agnus Dei)" (featuring Ryan Ofei, Nate Diaz and Lizzie Morgan)	Michael W. Smith	4:17
7.	"Miracle in the Works" (featuring Katie Torwalt and Jekalyn Carr)	Bryan Torwalt; Hank Bentley; Jessie Early; Katie Torwalt	7:12
8.	"My Hallelujah (Praise Before My Breakthrough)" (featuring Katie Torwalt and Jekalyn Carr)	B. Torwalt; K. Torwalt; Ran Jackson; Ricky Jackson	8:31
9.	"A Greater Mission" (featuring Sam Collier)	Sam Collier	21:14

Tribl Nights Anthologies — Apple Music bonus music video content
No.	Title	Length
1.	"Too Good to Not Believe" (featuring Lizzie Morgan, Melvin Crispell III and Cecily)	8:37
2.	"Be Praised" (featuring Ryan Ofei and Joe L Barnes)	7:01
3.	"Ways for Me" (featuring Dante Bowe)	12:16
4.	"We Have Hope" (featuring Joe L Barnes, Jonathan Traylor and Lizzie Morgan)	8:28
5.	"Canvas & Clay (King of My Heart)" (featuring Doe and Jonathan Traylor)	8:39
6.	"Never Lost" (featuring Joe L Barnes, Lizzie Morgan and Melvin Crispell III)	13:15
7.	"Build My Life" (featuring Joe L Barnes, Ryan Ofei and Jekalyn Carr)	11:53
8.	"If It Wasn't for Jesus (Spontaneous)" (featuring Amanda Cook)	3:30
9.	"Names (He Shall Reign)" (featuring Amanda Cook)	9:30
10.	"Where Would I Be?" (featuring Dante Bowe, Ryan Ofei and Brandon Lake)	8:04
11.	"Rest on Us" (featuring Mariah Adigun and Jekalyn Carr)	6:41
12.	"King of Heaven (Reign Jesus Reign)" (featuring Ryan Ofei, Nate Diaz and Lizzie Morgan)	9:55
13.	"King of Heaven (Agnus Dei)" (featuring Ryan Ofei, Nate Diaz and Lizzie Morgan)	4:18
14.	"Miracle in the Works" (featuring Katie Torwalt and Jekalyn Carr)	7:14
15.	"My Hallelujah (Praise Before My Breakthrough)" (featuring Katie Torwalt and Jekalyn Carr)	5:32

== Charts ==
=== Weekly charts ===
Weekly chart performance for Tribl Nights Anthologies
Chart (2022)	Peak position
US Top Christian Albums (Billboard)	41
US Gospel Albums (Billboard)	6

=== Year-end charts ===
Year-end chart performance for Tribl Nights Anthologies
Chart (2022)	Position
US Gospel Albums (Billboard)	37

== Release history ==
Release history for Tribl Nights Anthologies
Region	Date	Format(s)	Label(s)	Ref.
Various	April 29, 2022	Digital download; streaming	Tribl Records	
