= Move Your Heart =

2021 EP by Maverick City Music and Upperroom

EP by Maverick City Music and Upperroom
- Released: January 29, 2021
- Recorded: 2020
- Venue: Upperroom, Dallas, Texas, U.S.
- Genre: Contemporary worship music
- Label: Maverick City Music
- Producer: Jonathan Jay; Tony Brown; Oscar Gamboa

Maverick City Music chronology
Maverick City Christmas (2020)	Move Your Heart (2021)	Jubilee (2021)

Upperroom chronology
You Hold It All Together (2020)	Move Your Heart (2021)	Arbor (2021)

Move Your Heart is the second collaborative live extended play by American contemporary worship groups Maverick City Music and Upperroom. The EP was released on January 29, 2021, via Maverick City Music. The featured worship leaders on the EP are Brandon Lake, Eniola Abioye, Dante Bowe, Elyssa Smith, Joel Figueroa, Chandler Moore, Aaron Moses, Maryanne J. George and Chuck Butler. The EP was produced by Oscar Gamboa, Tony Brown and Jonathan Jay.

Move Your Heart debuted at No. 15 on Billboard's Top Christian Albums Chart and No. 1 on Top Gospel Albums Chart. It was nominated for the Billboard Music Award for Top Gospel Album at the 2022 Billboard Music Awards.

== Reception ==
=== Critical response ===
The Banner's Kayleigh Fongers applauded Maverick City Music and Upperroom in her review of the extended play, saying: "It’s evident that this project sprang forth from a genuine passion for music, community, and, most importantly, God."

=== Accolades ===
Awards
Year	Organization	Award	Result	Ref
2022	Billboard Music Awards	Top Gospel Album	Nominated	

== Commercial performance ==
In the United States, Move Your Heart debuted at No. 15 on Top Christian Albums and No. 1 on Top Gospel Albums charts, having earned 2,000 equivalent album units in its first week of sales.

== Track listing ==
Move Your Heart
No.	Title	Writer(s)	Length
1.	"Rest on Us" (featuring Brandon Lake and Eniola Abioye)	Brandon Lake; Tony Brown; Jonathan Jay; Harvest Parker; Rebekah White; Elyssa Smith	5:37
2.	"Move Your Heart" (featuring Dante Bowe and Elyssa Smith)	Dante Bowe; Smith; Oscar Gamboa; Joel Figueroa	10:21
3.	"Everything Is Yours (Spontaneous)" (featuring Dante Bowe, Elyssa Smith and Joel Figueroa)	Dante Bowe; Smith; Figueroa; Israel Houghton; Meleasa Houghton	13:04
4.	"Come and Behold" (featuring Chandler Moore and Elyssa Smith)	Elyssa Smith; Gamboa; Lucas Cortazio; Evelyn Heideriqui	7:40
5.	"I Want to See You (Spontaneous)" (featuring Chandler Moore)	Jon Thurlow; James Kufeldt; David Brymer; Paul Baloche	5:20
6.	"Your Blood Is Strong Enough" (featuring Chandler Moore)	Chandler Moore	5:13
7.	"I Thank God" (featuring Dante Bowe, Aaron Moses, Maryanne J. George and Chuck Butler)	Bowe; Aaron Moses; Maryanne J. George; Chuck Butler; Jesse Cline; Enrique Holmes	7:45

== Charts ==
=== Weekly charts ===
Weekly chart performance for Move Your Heart
Chart (2021)	Peak position
US Top Christian Albums (Billboard)	15
US Top Current Album Sales (Billboard)	88
US Top Gospel Albums (Billboard)	1

=== Year-end charts ===
Year-end chart performance for Move Your Heart
Chart (2021)	Position
US Christian Albums (Billboard)	85
US Gospel Albums (Billboard)	10
Chart (2022)	Position
US Christian Albums (Billboard)	78
US Gospel Albums (Billboard)	9
Chart (2023)	Position
US Christian Albums (Billboard)	65
US Gospel Albums (Billboard)	8
Chart (2025)	Position
US Gospel Albums (Billboard)	8

== Release history ==
Region	Date	Format(s)	Label(s)	Ref.
Various	January 29, 2021	Digital download; streaming	Maverick City Music	
