= Old Church Basement (song) =

2021 song by Elevation Worship and Maverick City Music

Song by Elevation Worship and Maverick City Music featuring Dante Bowe

from the album Old Church Basement
- Released: April 30, 2021
- Recorded: 2021
- Genre: Contemporary worship music
- Length: 6:42
- Label: Elevation Worship
- Songwriter(s): Steven Furtick; Brandon Lake; Dante Bowe; Chandler Moore
- Producer(s): Chris Brown; Steven Furtick; Jason Ingram; Tony Brown; Jonathan Jay

Music video
- "Old Church Basement" on YouTube
- "Old Church Basement" (Lyrics) on YouTube

"Old Church Basement" is a song performed by American contemporary worship bands Elevation Worship and Maverick City Music, which features vocals from Dante Bowe. The song was released as the opening track of the collaborative live album of the same name on April 30, 2021. The song was written by Brandon Lake, Chandler Moore, Dante Bowe, and Steven Furtick.

"Old Church Basement" debuted at No. 15 on the US Hot Christian Songs chart, and at No. 4 on the Hot Gospel Songs chart, despite not being released as an official single.

== Composition ==
"Old Church Basement" is composed in the key of A♭ with a tempo of 75 beats per minute, and a musical time signature of 4/4.

== Commercial performance ==
Following the release of the album, "Old Church Basement" made its debut at No. 15 on the US Hot Christian Songs chart, and at No. 4 on the Hot Gospel Songs chart, both dated May 15, 2021.

== Music videos ==
On April 30, 2021, Elevation Worship published the lyric video of the song on YouTube.

On May 3, 2021, Elevation Worship released the official music video of "Old Church Basement" on their YouTube channel. The video shows Dante Bowe leading the song.

== Charts ==
=== Weekly charts ===
Weekly chart performance for "Old Church Basement"
Chart (2021)	Peak position
New Zealand Hot Singles (RMNZ)	37
US Christian Songs (Billboard)	15
US Gospel Songs (Billboard)	4

=== Year-end charts ===
Year-end chart performance for "Old Church Basement"
Chart (2021)	Position
US Christian Songs (Billboard)	99
US Gospel Songs (Billboard)	38
