= Homecoming (Bethel Music album) =

2021 live album by Bethel Music

Live album by Bethel Music
- Released: September 24, 2021
- Recorded: July 21–23, 2021
- Venues: Redding Civic Auditorium, Redding, California, U.S.
- Genre: Contemporary worship music
- Length: 115:41
- Label: Bethel Music
- Producers: David Whitworth; Mat Ogden

Bethel Music chronology
Revival's in the Air (2020)	Homecoming (2021)	Homecoming (Español) (2021)

Singles from Homecoming
- 1. "Too Good to Not Believe" Released: May 21, 2021

Homecoming is the thirteenth live album by California-based worship collective Bethel Music. The album was released through the collective's imprint label, Bethel Music, on September 24, 2021. The featured worship leaders on the album are Cory Asbury, Zahriya Zachary, Jonathan David Helser, Melissa Helser, David Funk, Dante Bowe, Hannah McClure, Brandon Lake, Paul McClure, Brian Johnson, Jenn Johnson, Josh Baldwin, Emmy Rose, Kristene DiMarco, and Bethany Wohrle, with guest appearances from Gable Price, Gabe Jackson, Matt Redman, Naomi Raine and Chris Quilala.

The album was supported by the release of "Too Good to Not Believe" as the lead single, followed by the release of "Homecoming" and "I Believe" as promotional singles.

Homecoming debuted at No. 3 on Billboard's Top Christian Albums chart in the United States. The album received a GMA Dove Award nomination for Worship Album of the Year at the 2022 GMA Dove Awards.

On October 29, 2021, a Spanish version of Homecoming was released titled Homecoming (Español). It features Gable Price, Zahriya Zachary, Jonathan David Helser, Melissa Helser, David Funk, Hannah McClure, Paul McClure, Brian Johnson, Jenn Johnson, Josh Baldwin, Emmy Rose, Kristene DiMarco, and Bethany Wohrle, with guest appearances from Naomi Raine, Chris Quilala, Christine D'Clario, Edward Rivera, and Aaron Moses.

== Background ==
On September 3, 2021, Bethel Music announced that they would release the album Homecoming on September 24, 2021, revealing the tracks appearing on the album and making it available it for digital pre-saving. Christian Ostrom, creative director of Bethel Music, shared the inspiration behind the album, saying:

These last few years we haven't seen each other's faces, we haven't gathered in public, and we haven't been with family. Home is such a necessary part of our lives, and we have all felt its absence. This album is the beginning of us going back to "the why" of Bethel Music… the beginning of us walking step by step toward the One who awaits us with open arms.

== Release and promotion ==
=== Singles ===
Bethel Music and Brandon Lake released "Too Good to Not Believe" as the lead single from the album on May 21, 2021.

=== Promotional singles ===
Bethel Music and Cory Asbury released "Homecoming" featuring Gable Price as the first promotional single of the album on September 10, 2021.

Bethel Music, Jonathan David Helser and Melissa Helser released "I Believe" as the second promotional single from the album on September 17, 2021.

== Reception ==
=== Critical response ===
Professional ratings
Review scores
Source	Rating
365 Days of Inspiring Media	4.5/5
JubileeCast	4.5/5
Louder Than the Music	4.5/5 stars

JubileeCast's Timothy Yap gave a favourable review of the album, saying: "As expected, Homecoming (Live) doesn't disappoint. Though not all the songs are perfect, there's enough here to form the soundscape of worship for both the church and individuals." Joshua Andre in his 365 Days of Inspiring Media review gave a psotive review of the album, saying: "this overall musical masterpiece is a treasure that is to be explored over and over. With the lead vocalists sharing their voices on the album in perfect harmony and unison; Bethel Music remind us of the power in their live worship anthems, unveiling a very layered and unique album." Jono Davies, reviewing for Louder Than the Music, said: "It's refreshing to read that, they are not just putting anything out, this is a really exciting album."

=== Accolades ===
Awards
Year	Organization	Award	Result	Ref
2022	GMA Dove Awards	Worship Album of the Year	Nominated	

Year-end lists
Publication	Accolade	Rank	Ref.
NewReleaseToday	Best of 2021: Top 10 Albums of the Year	—N/a	
JubileeCast	Best Christian Albums of 2021	7	

== Track listing ==
Homecoming
No.	Title	Writer(s)	Length
1.	"Homecoming" (with Cory Asbury featuring Gable Price)	Brian Johnson; Christian Ostrom; Cory Asbury; Gable Price	7:48
2.	"Back to Life" (with Zahriya Zachary)	Brian Johnson; Ben Fielding; Chris Davenport; Phil Wickham; Reuben Morgan; Zahriya Zachary	6:35
3.	"I Believe" (with Jonathan David Helser and Melissa Helser)	Amanda Cook; Jason Ingram; Jonathan Helser; Melissa Helser; Steffany Gretzinger	7:36
4.	"Son of Suffering" (with David Funk featuring Matt Redman)	Aaron Moses; David Funk; Matt Redman; Nate Moore	7:59
5.	"Weathered" (with Dante Bowe and Hannah McClure)	Dante Bowe; Justin Amundrud; Madison Grace Binion; Rhyan Shirley	8:58
6.	"Too Good to Not Believe" (with Brandon Lake)	Brandon Lake; Davenport; Cody Carnes; Joshua Silverberg	10:33
7.	"Reason to Praise" (with Cory Asbury featuring Naomi Raine)	Fielding; Ben Hastings; Caleb Culver; Asbury	8:30
8.	"I Belong to Jesus" (with Paul McClure and Hannah McClure)	Hannah McClure; Paul McClure; Sean Curran	8:39
9.	"Hymn of Heaven" (with Brian Johnson and Zahriya Zachary)	Bill Johnson; Brian Johnson; Davenport; Wickham	8:26
10.	"Send Me" (with Jenn Johnson featuring Chris Quilala)	Lake; Jenn Johnson; Kari Jobe	6:30
11.	"My King Forever" (with Josh Baldwin)	Brian Johnson; Ethan Hulse; Josh Baldwin	5:15
12.	"He Reigns (Spontaneous)" (with Dante Bowe)	Bowe	5:26
13.	"Standing In Miracles" (with Emmy Rose)	Emmy Rose; Amundrud; Sarah Reeves	4:11
14.	"Wherever You Lead" (with Kristene DiMarco)	Dustin Smith; Hulse; Kristene DiMarco; Mitch Wong	4:48
15.	"All Hail King Jesus" (with Bethany Wohrle)	Jeremy Riddle; Peter Mattis; Ran Jackson; Gretzinger	5:36
16.	"Ring and Robe (Welcome Home)" (with Dante Bowe featuring Naomi Raine)	Bowe; Moses; Bede Benjamin-Korporaal; Amundrud	8:51
Total length:			115:41

Homecoming — Apple Music exclusive music video content
No.	Title	Length
17.	"Homecoming" (with Cory Asbury featuring Gable Price)	7:48
18.	"Back to Life" (with Zahriya Zachary)	6:35
19.	"I Believe" (with Jonathan David Helser and Melissa Helser)	7:35
20.	"Son of Suffering" (with David Funk featuring Matt Redman)	7:59
21.	"Weathered" (with Dante Bowe and Hannah McClure)	8:58
22.	"Reason to Praise" (with Cory Asbury featuring Naomi Raine)	8:30
23.	"I Belong to Jesus" (with Paul McClure and Hannah McClure)	8:39
24.	"Hymn of Heaven" (with Brian Johnson and Zahriya Zachary)	8:26
25.	"Send Me" (with Jenn Johnson featuring Chris Quilala)	6:30
26.	"My King Forever" (with Josh Baldwin)	5:15
27.	"He Reigns (Spontaneous)" (with Dante Bowe)	5:26
28.	"Standing In Miracles" (with Emmy Rose)	4:11
29.	"Wherever You Lead" (with Kristene DiMarco)	4:48
30.	"All Hail King Jesus" (with Bethany Wohrle)	5:37
31.	"Ring and Robe (Welcome Home)" (with Dante Bowe featuring Naomi Raine)	8:51
Total length:		220:49

== Charts ==
=== Weekly charts ===
Weekly chart performance of Homecoming
Chart (2021)	Peak position
Swiss Albums (Schweizer Hitparade)	67
US Top Christian Albums (Billboard)	3
US Top Album Sales (Billboard)	82

=== Year-end charts ===
Year-end chart performance for Homecoming
Chart (2021)	Position
US Christian Albums (Billboard)	70
Chart (2022)	Position
US Christian Albums (Billboard)	50
Chart (2023)	Position
US Christian Albums (Billboard)	70

== Release history ==
Release history and formats for Homecoming
Region	Date	Format(s)	Label(s)	Ref.
Various	September 24, 2021	Digital download; streaming	Bethel Music	
