= Grace Idowu =

Nigerian gospel singer

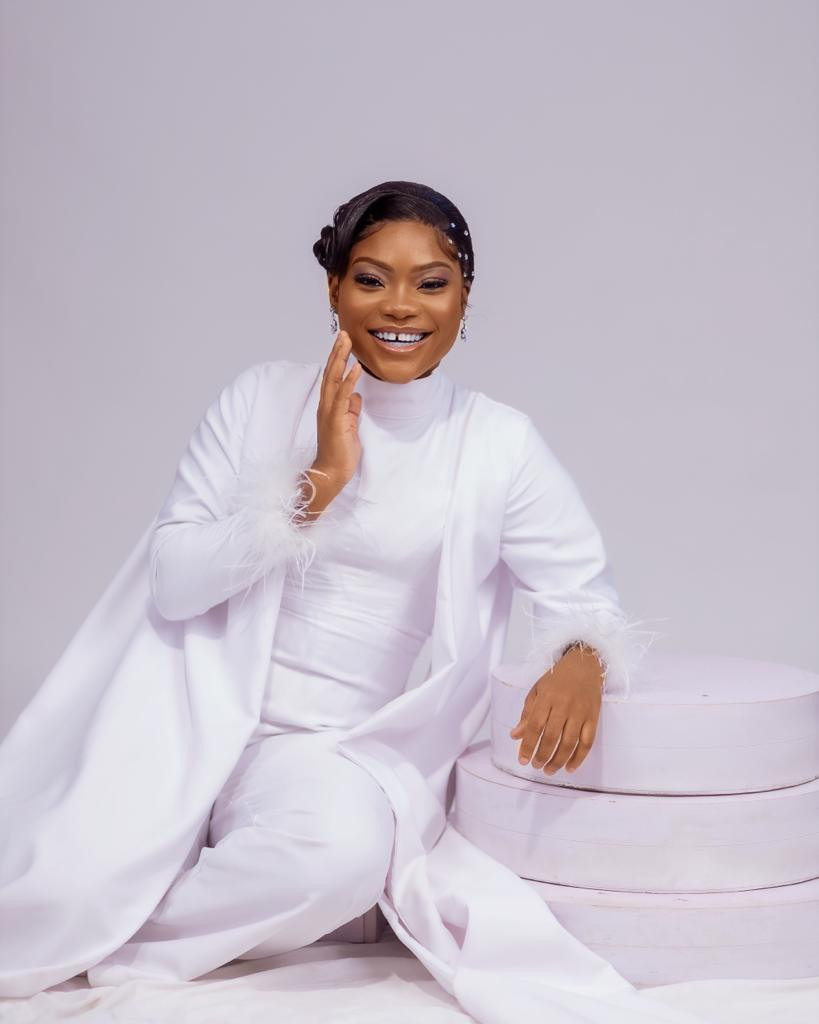

Background information
- Born: Grace Idowu Ibukunoluwa; May 3, 2000 (age 26); Lagos
- Genres: Gospel; contemporary Christian; urban contemporary gospel
- Occupations: Singer; songwriter
- Years active: 2020–present
- Label: Brand New Records

Grace Idowu Ibukunoluwa best known as Grace Idowu is a Nigerian gospel singer, and songwriter, currently signed to Brand New Records, with a management deal with Brand New Entertainment. Grace's debut into the music scene was met with critical acclaim when she released "Sokale", a record co-signed by Mr Eazi, and released through Brand New Records and licensed to emPawa.

She participated in the third season of emPawa Africa, a talent incubation in 2020. In 2023, she was nominated for AEAUSA Rising Stars at the African Entertainment Awards USA, and was nominated in the Rising Stars category at Kingdom Achievers Awards.

== Early life and career ==
Grace Idowu Ibukunoluwa hails from Ondo State and was born on 5 May 2000 in Lagos. She studied music at Babcock University.

In January 2020, Oluwole Ogundare signed Grace to his imprint Brand New Entertainment and its flagship Brand New Records. On 17 January 2020, she released her first single titled "Jesus" through Oluwole's Brand New Records and Brand New Entertainment. On 26 February 2020, she was introduced to the limelight by Mr Eazi as one of the 30 artists recruited into the emPawa Africa Program. She had a minor break with her debut single "Sokale", a record co-signed by Mr Eazi, and licensed to emPawa Africa.

Grace's first extended play Amazing God the E.P, was released on 28 February 2020. The ep featured guest appearance from Nigerian record producer Young D, and the ep is supported by one lead single titled "Jesus". After a three-year hiatus, she returned to the music scene on 12 August 2023, with an exclusive EP listening party upon the release of her second extended play More. On 18 August 2023, she released her second extended play More, listed among 14 top albums by Naija women so far in 2023 by Zikoko!.

== Artistry ==
Grace Idowu fuses contemporary gospel with style and blends of traditional gospel.

In an interview with Tribune, she says: "Her music career was inspired by the likes of American gospel singer, Kierra Sheard and Nigeria's gospel singer, Victoria Orenze".

== Discography ==
=== Live albums ===
Title	Details	Peak chart positions	
Title	Details	US Christ.	US Gospel
I Was Made to Glorify Your Name (with Maverick City Music and Dante Bowe)	Released: February 27, 2026; Label: Tribl Records; Format: Digital download, streaming	30	6
Holy (with Maverick City Music and Dante Bowe)	Released: June 26, 2026; Label: Tribl; Format: Digital download, streaming	—	8
"—" denotes a recording that did not chart

=== EPs ===
List of studio extended plays, with selected details and chart positions
Title	Details
Amazing God the E.P	Released: 28 February 2020; Label: Brand New Records; Formats: Digital download
More	Released: 18 August 2023; Label: Brand New Records; Formats: Digital download

=== As lead artist ===
List of singles as lead artist, with year released and album shown
Title	Year	Certifications	Album
"Jesus" (feat. Young D)	2020		Amazing God the E.P
"Sokale"	2020		Non-album single

== Accolades ==
Year	Awards ceremony	Award description(s)	Nominated work	Results
2023	African Entertainment Awards USA	AEAUSA Rising Stars	Herself	Nominated
2023	Kingdom Achievers Awards	Rising Stars	Herself	Pending
