= I Thank God =

2021 song by Maverick City Music and Upperroom

Song by Maverick City Music and Upperroom featuring Dante Bowe and Aaron Moses

from the EP Move Your Heart
- Released: January 29, 2021
- Recorded: 2020
- Venue: Upperroom, Dallas, Texas, U.S.
- Genre: Contemporary worship music; contemporary gospel
- Length: 7:45
- Label: Maverick City Music
- Songwriters: Aaron Moses; Chuck Butler; Dante Bowe; Enrique Holmes; Jesse Cline; Maryanne J. George; Jonathan Traylor
- Producers: Jonathan Jay; Tony Brown; Oscar Gamboa

Music video
- "I Thank God" on YouTube

"I Thank God" is a song performed by American contemporary worship groups Maverick City Music and Upperroom featuring Dante Bowe and Aaron Moses. It was released by Tribl Records as a track on their collaborative extended play, Move Your Heart, on January 29, 2021. The song was written by Jesse Cline, Maryanne J George, Dante Bowe, Aaron Moses, Enrique Holmes, Jonathan Traylor, and Chuck Butler. Jonathan Jay, Tony Brown, and Oscar Gamboa produced the song.

"I Thank God" debuted at No. 29 on the US Hot Christian Songs chart, and No. 7 on the Hot Gospel Songs chart.

== Background ==
On January 22, 2021, Tribl published the official music video of "I Thank God" by Maverick City Music and Upperroom featuring Dante Bowe and Aaron Moses, in the lead-up to the release of Move Your Heart EP slated for January 29, 2021. The song was released as a track on the extended play on January 29, 2021.

== Composition ==
"I Thank God" is composed in the key of D♭ with a tempo of 130 beats per minute and a musical time signature of 4/4.

== Commercial performance ==
"I Thank God" debuted at No. 29 on the US Hot Christian Songs, and No. 7 on the Hot Gospel Songs charts dated February 13, 2021, "I Thank God" is the first top ten Hot Gospel Songs entry for both Maverick City Music and Upperroom.

== Music video ==
Tribl released the official music video of "I Thank God" featuring Dante Bowe and Aaron Moses leading the song at Upperroom, Dallas, Texas, through their YouTube channel on January 22, 2021.

== Charts ==
Weekly chart performance for "I Thank God"
Chart (2021)	Peak position
US Hot Christian Songs (Billboard)	29
US Gospel Songs (Billboard)	7
