= Jon Thurlow =

American contemporary worship musician (born 1980)

- Born: Jonathan Merrill Thurlow; December 27, 1980 (age 45); Oakland, California
- Origin: Kansas City, Missouri
- Genres: Contemporary worship music
- Occupations: Singer, songwriter
- Instruments: Vocals, singer-songwriter
- Years active: 2004–present
- Labels: Forerunner Music (formerly), Watershed Music Group (current)
- Website: jonthurlow.com

Jonathan Merrill "Jon" Thurlow (born December 27, 1980) is an American contemporary worship musician. His first release was an independent release in 2006, A Life That's Worthy. After releasing several independent recordings, he went on to release his first record with Forerunner Music in 2014, Stand in Awe. This album was his breakthrough release upon the Billboard magazine Christian Albums and Heatseekers Albums charts. In 2019, he teamed up with Watershed Music Group as a published songwriter and distributed recording artist.

== Early life ==
Thurlow was born on December 27, 1980, in the city of Oakland, California, as Jonathan Merrill Thurlow, to Paul Mark Thurlow and Susan L. Thurlow (née, Krusz). He was raised in Colorado Springs, Colorado, a place where he considers it to be his hometown, and where he started to lead worship activities as a teenager in high school. Thurlow went to Nyack College located in Nyack, New York, where he graduated with a Bachelor of Sacred Music. After college in 2004, he relocated to Kansas City, Missouri, to join the International House of Prayer.

== Personal life ==
Jon Thurlow is a songwriter and worship leader in Kansas City. For 15 years he served on staff as a worship leader at the International House of Prayer, and continues to write and minister in worship regionally and internationally. His heart is for his music to be an onramp for the listener to connect with Jesus. Jon is married to his wife Kinsey, and together they have a daughter.

== Music career ==
Thurlow's music career commenced in 2013, by him signing with Forerunner Music, where they would release his debut studio album the same year. His first album, Stand in Awe, was released by Forerunner Music on October 22, 2013. The album was his breakthrough release upon the Billboard magazine charts, where it placed at No. 24 on the Christian Albums chart and at No. 11 on the Heatseekers Albums chart.

== Discography ==
=== Studio albums ===
Title	Album details	Peak chart positions	
Title	Album details	US Christ	US Heat
A Life That's Worthy	Released: December 28, 2006; Label: Jon Thurlow/Watershed; CD, digital download	–	–
Strong Love	Released: December 22, 2010; Label: Jon Thurlow/Watershed; CD, digital download	–	–
Christmas	Released: December 22, 2010; Label: Jon Thurlow/Watershed; CD, digital download	–	–
Songs about Jesus	Released: April 12, 2011; Label: Jon Thurlow/Watershed; CD, digital download	–	–
The Anointed One	Released: December 22, 2011; Label: Jon Thurlow/Watershed; CD, digital download	–	–
Heat of Your Gaze	Released: October 19, 2012; Label: Jon Thurlow/Watershed; CD, digital download	–	–
Stand in Awe	Released: October 22, 2013; Label: Forerunner; CD, digital download	24	11
Walking Through the Night	Released: September 2, 2014; Label: Jon Thurlow/Watershed; CD, digital download	–	–
Different Story	Released: November 17, 2017; Label: Forerunner; CD, digital download		
