= Jekalyn Carr =

American singer-songwriter

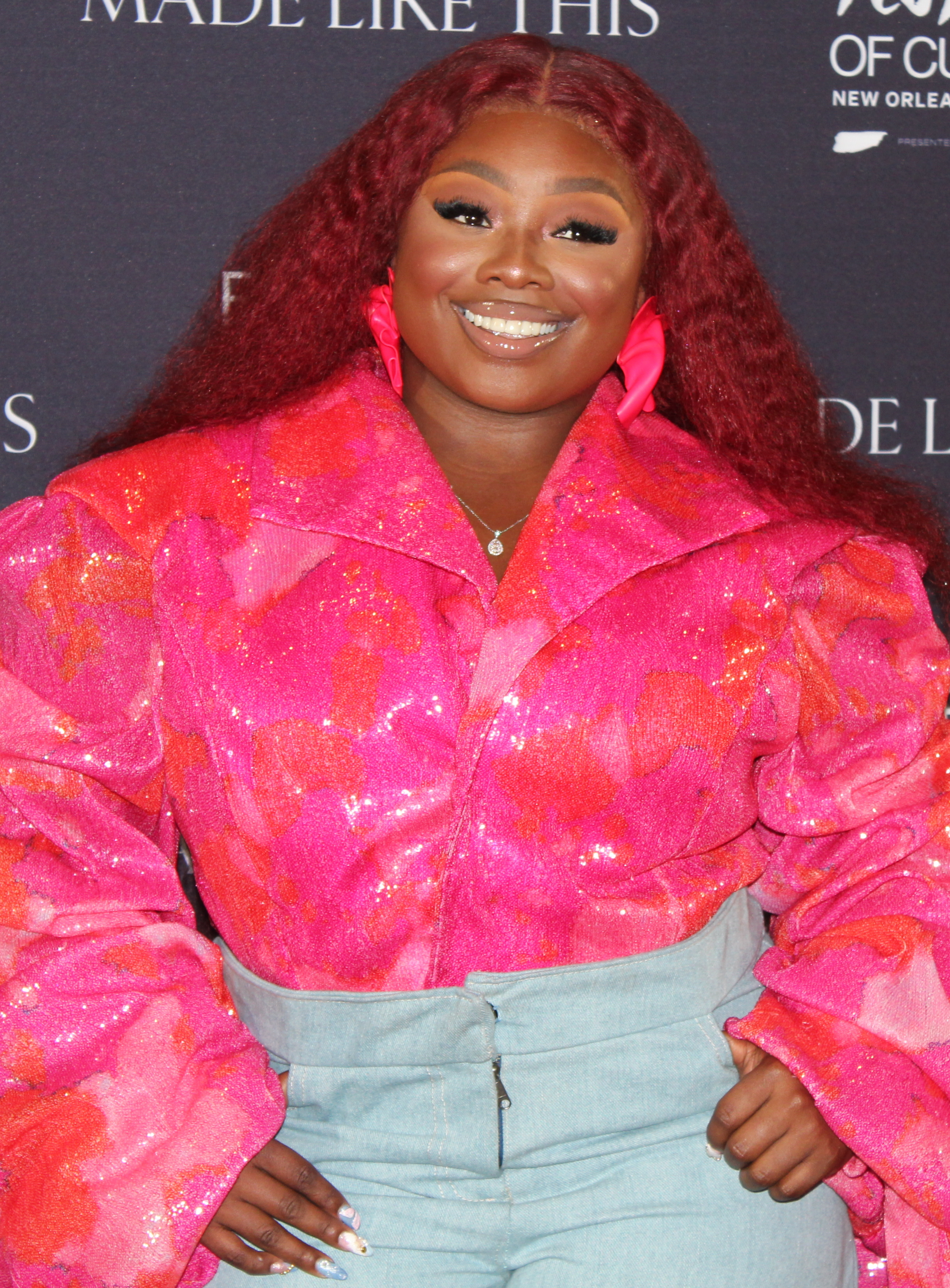
- Carr at Essence Festival of Culture in 2025

Background information
- Born: Jekalyn Almonique Carr; April 22, 1997 (age 29); Memphis, Tennessee, U.S.
- Origin: Atlanta, GA, West Memphis, AR
- Genre: Gospel
- Occupations: Singer, songwriter
- Years active: 2011-present
- Labels: MNRK Music Group; Lunjeal; WayNorth
- Website: iamjekalyncarr.com

Jekalyn Almonique Carr (born April 22, 1997) is an American gospel singer-songwriter. She has received six Grammy nominations, including a win for Best Gospel Performance/Song for “One Hallelujah” with Israel Houghton, Erica Campbell, Tasha Cobbs Leonard, and Jonathan McReynolds in 2025.

== Early life ==
Jekalyn Almonique Carr was born on April 22, 1997, to Jennifer Denise Carr and Allen Lindsey Carr in Arkansas. Jekalyn has two siblings, Allen Lindsey Carr Jr. and Allundria Carr.

At 5 years old, Carr began serving in her church's choir, and members of her family noted that she had a decent ear for music. Carr is a self-taught vocalist and became a main chorister in her neighborhood church. At age 11, she was called to serve in ministry, both as a speaker and singer.

== Music career ==
At the age of 15, her professional focus shifted to music when her single, “Greater Is Coming,” debuted on Billboard’s Gospel Music Top Ten. Carr received her first Stellar Award at the age of 16. In 2021, Carr became the first gospel artist to be inducted into the Women Songwriters Hall of Fame and in 2022, she received the Lifetime Achievement Award from President Joe Biden.

On September 6 2024, Carr’s is set to release “Jekalyn Carr Presents... The Inspiration Project”. It is an album with songs featuring other recording artists including Emoni Wilkins, Jericho Worship and Timothy Rogers.

== Discography ==
=== Albums ===
==== Studio albums ====
| Title | Album details | Peak chart positions | | |
| Title | Album details | US | US Gospel | US Ind. |
|---|---|---|---|---|
| Promise | Released: January 1st, 2010; Label: Independent; Formats: CD, digital download | — | — | — |
| Greater Is Coming | Released: May 21st, 2013; Label: Lunjeal Music Group; Formats: CD, digital download | 183 | 3 | 31 |
| It's Gonna Happen | Released: October 7th, 2014; Label: Lunjeal Music Group; Formats: CD, digital download | — | 9 | — |
| The Life Project | Released: August 5th, 2016; Label: Lunjeal Music Group; Formats: CD, digital download | — | 1 | 17 |
| One Nation Under God | Released: February 23rd, 2018; Label: Lunjeal Music Group; Formats: CD, digital download | — | 1 | 10 |
| Changing Your Story | Released: October 23rd, 2020; Label: Lunjeal Music Group; Formats: CD, digital download | — | 8 | — |
| Jekalyn | Released: October 20th, 2023; Label: WayNorth Music; Formats: CD, digital download | — | 13 | — |
| Jekalyn X the Legends | Released: November 7, 2025; Label: WayNorth Music; Formats: CD, digital download | — | 13 | — |

=== Singles and other charting songs ===
==== As lead artist ====
List of singles, as a lead artist, with selected chart positions, showing year released and album name
| Title | Year | Peak chart positions | | | | Certifications | Album |
| Title | Year | US Adult R&B | US Gospel | US Gospel Air | US Gospel Digital | Certifications | Album |
|---|---|---|---|---|---|---|---|
| "Greater Is Coming" | 2012 | — | 7 | 7 | 6 | | Greater Is Coming |
| "They Said, But God Said" | 2013 | — | 18 | 16 | — | | Greater Is Coming |
| "It's Gonna Happen" | 2014 | — | 15 | 13 | 23 | | It's Gonna Happen |
| "Something Big" | 2015 | — | — | 19 | — | | It's Gonna Happen |
| "You're Bigger" | 2016 | — | 2 | 1 | 1 | | The Life Project |
| "You Spoke Over Me" | 2017 | — | — | 29 | — | | The Life Project |
| "You Are Our Joy" | 2017 | — | 22 | 28 | — | | The Life Project |
| "You Will Win" | 2017 | — | 5 | 1 | 1 | | One Nation Under God |
| "It's Yours" | 2018 | — | 3 | 1 | — | | One Nation Under God |
| "Stay With Me" (Featuring Ashley Mackey) | 2018 | — | — | — | 3 | | One Nation Under God |
| "I Am A Winner" | 2018 | — | — | — | 24 | | One Nation Under God |
| "I See Miracles" | 2019 | — | 10 | 4 | 4 | | Non-album single |
| "Changing Your Story" | 2020 | — | 6 | 1 | 3 | | Changing Your Story |
| "Power Of Love" | 2020 | 30 | — | — | — | | Changing Your Story |
| "Jehovah Jireh" | 2021 | — | 7 | 1 | — | | Changing Your Story |
| "New Day" (with Blanca) | 2022 | — | 23 | — | — | | Non-album single |
| "My Portion" | 2022 | — | 12 | 1 | 8 | | Non-album single |
| "Great Christmas" | 2022 | — | — | — | — | | Non-album single |
| "I Believe God" | 2023 | — | 8 | 1 | — | | Jekalyn |
| "God of War" (featuring Elevation Worship and Elevation Rhythm) | 2023 | — | — | — | — | | Jekalyn |
| "Don't Faint" (original or with John P. Kee) | 2025 | — | 11 | 1 | — | | Jekalyn X Legends |

==== As featured artist ====
- "Bless Somebody Else (Dorothy's Song)" (Kurt Carr Featuring The Kurt Carr Singers & Friends) (2019)
- "Make It Right" (Maverick City Music featuring Dante Bowe, Todd Dulaney, Jekalyn Carr & Mav City Gospel Choir) (2021)
- "Mean Girls" (Leanna Crawford featuring Jekalyn Carr) (2021)

== Published works ==
- You Will Win (2018)

== Awards and nominations ==
| Year | Ceremony | Award | Result | Ref |
|---|---|---|---|---|
| 2017 | 59th Annual Grammy Awards | Grammy Award for Best Gospel Performance/Song ("You're Bigger (Live)") | Nominated | |
| 2019 | 61st Annual Grammy Awards | Grammy Award for Best Gospel Performance/Song ("You Will Win") | Nominated | |
| 2019 | 61st Annual Grammy Awards | Grammy Award for Best Gospel Album (One Nation Under God) | Nominated | |
| 2019 | 34th Annual Stellar Awards | Albertina Walker Female Vocalist of the Year | Won | |
| 2019 | 34th Annual Stellar Awards | Traditional Female Vocalist of the Year | Won | |
| 2019 | 34th Annual Stellar Awards | Traditional CD of the Year (One Nation Under God) | Won | |
| 2019 | 34th Annual Stellar Awards | Recorded Music Package of the Year (One Nation Under God) | Nominated | |
| 2019 | 34th Annual Stellar Awards | Artist of the Year | Nominated | |
| 2020 | 62nd Annual Grammy Awards | Grammy Award for Best Gospel Performance/Song ("See The Light") | Nominated | |
| 2021 | 36th Annual Stellar Awards | Stellar Award for Traditional Female Vocalist | Won | |
| 2021 | 36th Annual Stellar Awards | Stellar Award for Traditional Album Of The Year (Changing Your Story) | Won | |
| 2022 | 64th Annual Grammy Awards | Grammy Award for Best Gospel Album (Changing Your Story: Live) | Nominated | |
| 2026 | 41st Annual Stellar Awards | Artist of the Year | Nominated | |
| 2026 | 41st Annual Stellar Awards | Albertina Walker Female Artist of the Year | Nominated | |
| 2026 | 41st Annual Stellar Awards | Music Video of the Year ("I Am Happy") | Nominated | |
| 2026 | 41st Annual Stellar Awards | Traditional Album of the Year (Jekalyn X the Legends) | Won | |
| 2026 | 41st Annual Stellar Awards | Traditional Artist of the Year | Won | |
| 2026 | 41st Annual Stellar Awards | Recording Music Package of the Year (Jekalyn X the Legends) | Nominated | |
