= Tribl =

American contemporary worship music collective

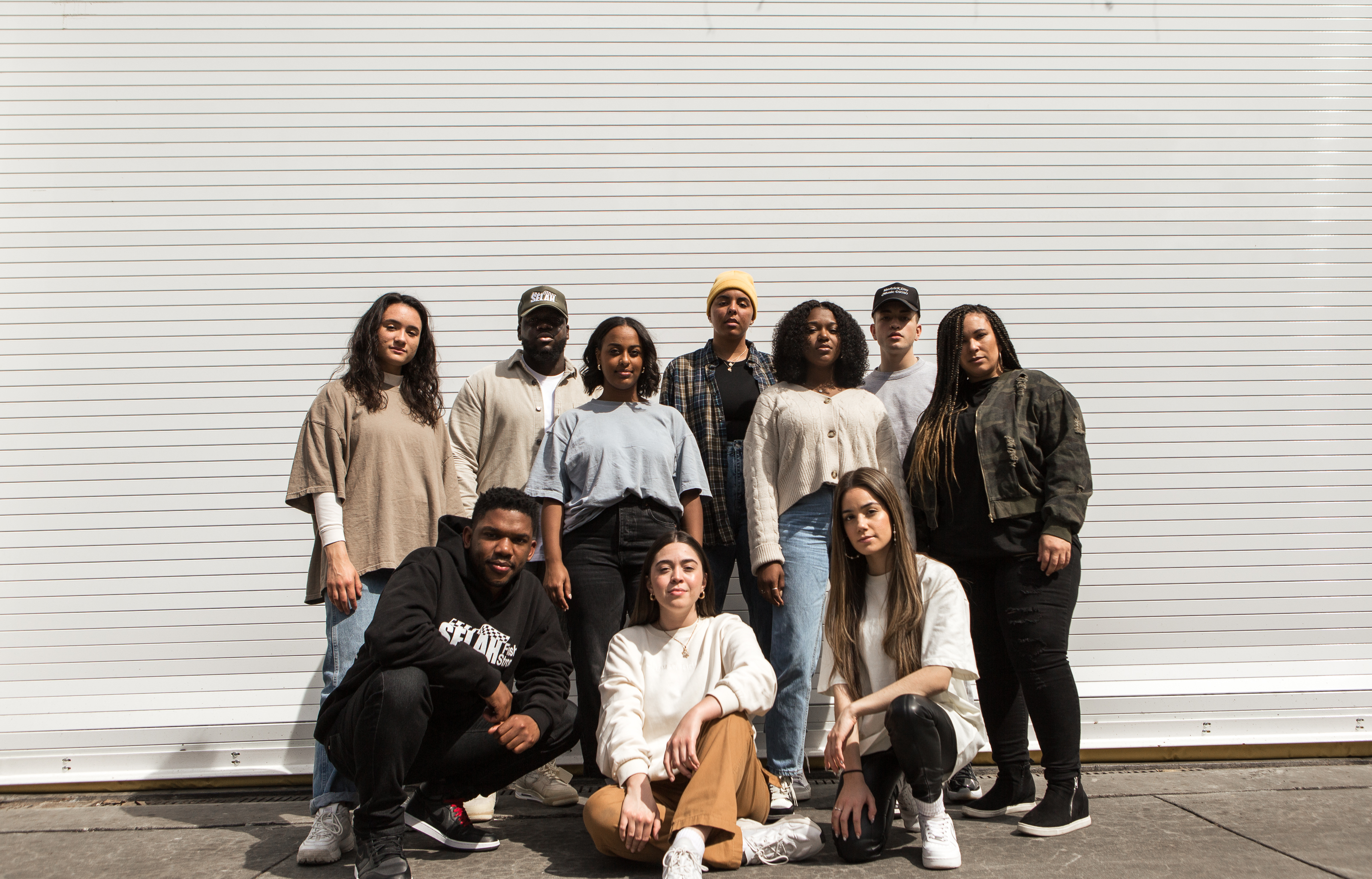

Background information
- Origin: Atlanta, Georgia, US
- Genres: Contemporary worship; CCM; contemporary gospel
- Years active: 2021–present
- Label: Tribl Records
- Members: Ryan Ofei; Melody Adorno; Laila Olivera; Jessica Hitte; Montel Moore; Sirion Worku; Marián Adigun
- Past members: Tianna Horsey; Nate Díaz; Cecily
- Website: www.tribl.com/artists/tribl

Tribl (pronounced "tribal") is an American contemporary worship music collective originating from Atlanta, Georgia. The collective made its debut in 2021 with the release of Tribl I, a collaborative live album with Maverick City Music. Tribl I debuted at number ten on the Top Christian Albums Chart and number three on the Top Gospel Albums Chart in the United States. Tribl went on to release their second live album, Tribl Nights Atlanta (2021). Tribl Nights Atlanta debuted at number 46 on the Top Christian Albums Chart and number six on the Top Gospel Albums Chart. In 2022, Tribl released Tribl Nights Anthologies, their second collaborative live album with Maverick City Music. Tribl Nights Anthologies debuted at number 41 on the Top Christian Albums Chart and number six on the Top Gospel Albums Chart.

== Career ==
On May 28, Tribl released their debut promotional single, "Still Holy" featuring Ryan Ofei and Naomi Raine, announcing that they will release their debut collaborative album with Maverick City Music titled Tribl I, initially slated for June 11, 2021. Tribl I was ultimately released on July 23, 2021. Tribl I debuted at number ten on the Top Christian Albums Chart, and number three on the Top Gospel Albums Chart in the United States. Tribl then went on to release their second live album, Tribl Nights Atlanta on November 12, 2021. Tribl Nights Atlanta debuted at number 46 on the Top Christian Albums Chart, and number six on the Top Gospel Albums Chart. On April 29, 2022, Tribl and Maverick City Music released Tribl Nights Anthologies, their second collaborative album. Tribl Nights Anthologies debuted at number 46 on the Top Christian Albums Chart, and number six on the Top Gospel Albums Chart.

== Members ==
The current members of Tribl are:

- Ryan Ofei
- Cecily
- Nate Díaz
- Melody Adorno
- Laila Olivera
- Tianna Horsey
- Jessica Hitte
- Montell Moore
- Siri Worku
- Marián Adigun

== Discography ==
=== Live albums ===
List of live albums, with selected chart positions
Title	Album details	Peak chart positions	
Title	Album details	US Christ	US Gospel
Tribl I (with Maverick City Music)	Released: July 23, 2021; Label: Tribl Records; Format: Digital download, streaming	10	3
Tribl Nights Atlanta	Released: November 12, 2021; Label: Tribl Records; Format: Digital download, streaming	46	6
Tribl Nights Anthologies (with Maverick City Music)	Released: April 29, 2022; Label: Tribl Records; Format: Digital download, streaming	41	6
Live From 1971 (with Sons the Band)	Released: September 9, 2022; Label: Tribl Records; Format: Digital download, streaming	—	—
"—" denotes a recording that did not chart or was not released in that territory.

=== Singles ===
List of singles
Title	Year	Album
"Defender" (with Cecily)	2021	Non-album single
"Ways for Me" (featuring Dante Bowe)	2021	Tribl Nights Atlanta
"We Have Hope" (featuring Joe L Barnes, Jonathan Traylor and Lizzie Morgan)	2021	Tribl Nights Atlanta
"Cross and Empty Grave" (with Sons the Band featuring Steve Davis and Jordan Colle)	2022	Live From 1971

=== Promotional singles ===
List of promotional singles
Title	Year	Album
"Still Holy" (with Maverick City Music featuring Ryan Ofei and Naomi Raine)	2021	Tribl I
"Too Good to Not Believe" (with Maverick City Music featuring Lizzie Morgan, Cecily and Melvin Crispell III)	2022	Tribl Nights Anthologies
"King of Heaven (Reign Jesus Reign)" (with Maverick City Music featuring Ryan Ofei, Nate Diaz and Lizzie Morgan)	2022	Tribl Nights Anthologies
"Only Ever Good" (with Sons the Band featuring Steve Davis and Jordan Colle)	2022	Live From 1971

== Awards and nominations ==
=== GMA Dove Awards ===
Year	Nominee / work	Award	Result	Ref.
2022	Tribl Nights Atlanta (with Maverick City Music)	Gospel Worship Album of the Year	Won	

== See also ==
- List of Christian worship music artists
