= Ryan Ofei =

- Born: United Kingdom
- Origin: Ottawa, Ontario
- Genre: Gospel music
- Occupations: singer; songwriter
- Years active: 2019–present
- Labels: Minstrel Records; Limitless Worship
- Member of: Maverick City Music; Tribl
- Award: Juno Award for Contemporary Christian/Gospel Album of the Year
- Website: ryanofei.com

Ryan Ofei is a Canadian gospel musician based in Ottawa, Ontario. He won the Juno Award for Contemporary Christian/Gospel Album of the Year at the Juno Awards of 2025 for his album Restore.

== Personal life ==
Ofei was born in the United Kingdom and raised in Ghana. He emigrated with his family first to the United States and later to Canada in childhood. He attended Carleton University, where he and a group of friends, including fellow Juno nominee Kofi Dartey, launched a campus worship group, Campus Rush, that continues to operate in Ottawa.

== Career ==
Ofei participated in Maverick City Music's Jubilee: Juneteenth Edition (2021), which was nominated for the Grammy Award for Best Gospel Album at the 2022 Grammy Awards.

Following his Juno victory, he received a second Juno nomination at the Juno Awards of 2026 for Jubilate.

== Discography ==
=== Studio albums ===
List of albums, with selected chart positions
Title	Album details	Peak chart positions
Title	Album details	UK Christ.
Restore	Released: 21 June 2024; Label: Limitless Worship; Formats: Digital download, streaming	17

=== Live albums ===
Title	Details
Restore: Live in London	Releasing: 30 January 2026; Label: Limitless; Formats: Digital download, streaming

=== Extended plays ===
Title	Details
David's Heart	Releasing: 21 November 2019; Label: Minstrel Records; Formats: Digital download, streaming
The Vow	Releasing: 15 July 2022; Label: Minstrel; Formats: Digital download, streaming
Limitless Worship: Accra	Releasing: 31 March 2023; Label: Limitless; Formats: Digital download, streaming
Celebrate	Releasing: 18 August 2023; Label: Limitless; Formats: Digital download, streaming
Jubilate	Released: 11 July 2025; Label: Limitless; Formats: Digital download, streaming

=== Singles ===
==== As lead artist ====
Title	Year	Album
"No Limits"	2019	David's Heart (EP)
"Jehovah"	2019	David's Heart (EP)
"Creation's Song" (featuring Grace Marr)	2020	Non-album singles
"Jehova Medley" (featuring Charity Grant)	2020	Non-album singles
"The Vow"	2022	The Vow (EP)
"Amen (Wo Awie)" (featuring Joe Mettle)	2023	Limitless Worship: Accra (EP)
"Daily" (featuring Limoblaze and Becca Folkes)	2023	Restore
"Abba" (featuring Ahjah)	2023	Restore
"New Every Morning"	2023	Restore
"You Surround"	2024	Restore
"Baba" (featuring CalledOut Music and Annatoria)	2024	Restore
"Abide"	2024	Restore
"We Still Believe (HLY Forever)" (with KB featuring One Church Music)	2025	Non-album single
"Too Much"	2025	Jubilate (EP)
"Ways" (featuring Xavier Omar)	2025	Jubilate (EP)
"Oluwa Ese"	2025	Jubilate (EP)
"Blessed" (featuring Tjsarx)	2025	Jubilate (EP)
"Noel"	2025	Non-album single

==== As featured artist ====
Title	Year	Album
"God Is Alive Now" (Daniel Ojo featuring Ryan Ofei)	2020	Non-album single
"Protect My Peace" (SAO! featuring Ryan Ofei)	2023	Saint (EP)
"Fear Not (Never Stop Praying)" (One House featuring Ryan Ofei and Kyle McHargh)	2024	Non-album singles
"Prosper" (aP featuring Ryan Ofei)	2025	Non-album singles

=== Promotional singles ===
==== As lead artist ====
Title	Year	Album
"Temple" (featuring Madison Ryann Ward)	2024	Restore
"Jubilate"	2025	Jubilate (EP)

==== As featured artist ====
Title	Year	Album
"Still Holy" (Tribl and Maverick City Music featuring Ryan Ofei and Naomi Raine)	2021	Tribl I
"Above Your Name" (Campus Rush Music and Sewa featuring Ryan Ofei)	2022	Still Belive
"King of Heaven (Reign Jesus Reign)" (Tribl and Maverick City Music featuring Ryan Ofei, Nate Diaz, and Lizzie Morgan)	2022	Tribl Nights Anthologies

== Awards and nominations ==
=== Juno Awards ===
Year	Category	Work	Result	Ref.
2025	Contemporary Christian/Gospel Album of the Year	Restore	Won	
2026	Contemporary Christian/Gospel Album of the Year	Jubilate (EP)	Won	
