= Maverick City Music =

American contemporary worship music collective

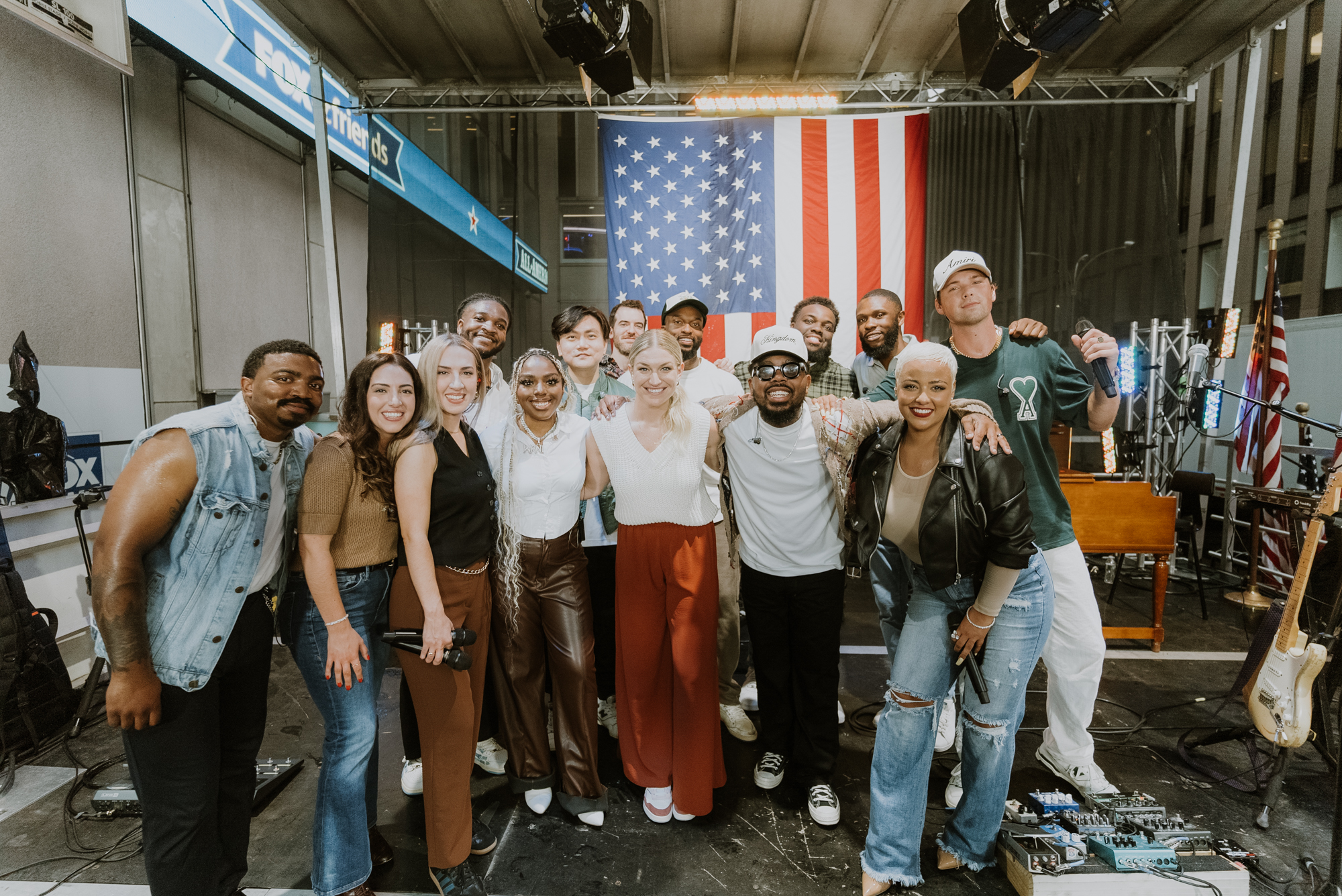
- Maverick City in 2023

Background information
- Also known as: Mav, Mav City, Mav Music, Maverick Music, and Mav City Music
- Origin: Atlanta, Georgia, US
- Genres: Contemporary worship; CCM; contemporary gospel
- Years active: 2018–present
- Labels: Maverick City; Tribl Records; Undivided ent/Live Nation
- Members: Dante Bowe; Brunes Charles; Sam Simon; Jonathan Jay ("JJ"); Norman Gyamfi; Colin Gleaves; Noah Schnacky; Allison Schnacky; Tasha Cobbs Leonard; Todd Galberth; Ashley Hess; Nick Day; Genavieve Linkowski; Mara Justine; Ryan Ofei; Alton Eugene
- Past members: Naomi Raine; Chandler Moore; Aaron Moses; Joe L Barnes; Harold Brown; Brandon Lake; Maryanne J. George; Harold Ray Brown
- Website: maverickcitymusic.com

Maverick City Music is an American contemporary Christian worship music collective founded by Tony Brown and Jonathan Jay originating from Atlanta.

The collective made its debut in 2019 with the release of two extended plays, Maverick City, Vol. 1 and Maverick City, Vol. 2. In 2020, Maverick City Music released two live albums: Maverick City Vol. 3 Part 1 and Maverick City, Vol. 3 Pt. 2, with the former featuring the singles, "Man of Your Word" and "Promises". The collective later released their first collaborative EP with Upperroom, You Hold It All Together (2020) which was followed by the holiday-themed EP, Maverick City Christmas (2020). In 2021, Maverick City Music released several projects, the most notable being their second collaborative EP with Upperroom, Move Your Heart; a collaborative album with Elevation Worship titled Old Church Basement which contained the hit songs "Jireh", "Talking to Jesus" and "Wait on You"; and Jubilee: Juneteenth Edition, which attained commercial success and garnered widespread critical acclaim.

Maverick City Music's accolades include 5 Grammy Awards, 5 GMA Dove Awards, 1 Billboard Music Award, and 1 Soul Train Music Award.

== History ==
Maverick City Music was launched in 2018 when 17 songwriting camps brought together over 100 Christian artists and songwriters, resulting in the creation of over 100 songs and a label. Tony Brown and Jonathan Jay, who were writing for the gospel music group Housefires at the time, intended to create space for diversity by including creatives who are often marginalized such as black people and women who are CCM singers and songwriters, and bringing attention to their voices and ability. Maverick City Music released their first extended play, Maverick City, Vol. 1, on July 29, 2019. The EP debuted on Billboard's Top Gospel Albums Chart at number ten. On November 12, 2019, Maverick City Music released their follow-up EP, Maverick City, Vol. 2. The release debuted at number 35 on Billboard's Top Christian Albums Chart.

On April 17, 2020, Maverick City Music released their debut album, Maverick City Vol. 3 Part 1, independently. In the United States, the album debuted at number six on Top Christian Albums and number two on Top Gospel Albums charts. Maverick City, Vol. 3 Part 1 also debuted at number 15 on the Official Christian and Gospel Albums Chart in the United Kingdom. On July 27, 2020, Maverick City Music announced that the song "Man of Your Word" which features Chandler Moore and KJ Scriven, would impact Christian radio stations on August 21, 2020, being their debut radio single. "Man of Your Word" peaked at number 18 on the Hot Christian Songs chart, and spent a total of 26 non-consecutive weeks on the chart. Maverick City Music garnered two nominations for the 2020 GMA Dove Awards, with "Promises" being nominated in the Gospel Worship Recorded Song of the Year award and Maverick City Vol. 3 Part 1 being nominated in the Gospel Worship Album of the Year award.

On October 9, 2020, the collective released their second studio album, Maverick City, Vol. 3 Pt. 2. The album debuted at number four on Top Christian Albums and number two on Top Gospel Albums charts in the United States. Maverick City, Vol. 3 Pt. 2 also debuted at number 8 on the Official Christian and Gospel Albums Chart in the United Kingdom. Maverick City Music and Upperroom released their first collaborative extended play titled You Hold It All Together, on November 20, 2020. You Hold It All Together debuted at number 20 on Top Christian Albums and number two on Top Gospel Albums charts in the United States. Maverick City Music released a holiday-themed extended play titled Maverick City Christmas a week later, on November 27, 2020. Maverick City Christmas debuted at number four on Top Gospel Albums charts in the United States.

On January 29, 2021, Maverick City Music and Upperroom released their second collaborative extended play titled Move Your Heart. Move Your Heart debuted at number 15 on Top Christian Albums and number one on Top Gospel Albums charts in the United States. On February 26, 2021, the collective released an extended play titled Jubilee. Jubilee debuted at number 14 on Top Christian Albums and number two on Top Gospel Albums charts in the United States. On March 12, 2021, Maverick City Music released their first Spanish-language single, "Acercame" which features Johnny Peña & Laila Olivera as the lead single to their first Spanish album, Como En El Cielo. Como En El Cielo was released on March 19, 2021.

On March 26, 2021, Elevation Worship and Maverick City Music released a promotional single titled "Jireh" which features Chandler Moore and Naomi Raine, in the lead-up to the release of their first collaborative album, Old Church Basement. "Jireh" peaked at number 8 on the US Hot Christian Songs chart, and debuted at number one on the Hot Gospel Songs chart. On April 9, 2021, Elevation Worship and Maverick City Music released "Talking to Jesus", which features Brandon Lake as the second promotional single from Old Church Basement. "Talking to Jesus" debuted at number 9 on the US Hot Christian Songs chart and at number one on the Hot Gospel Songs chart. On April 23, 2021, Elevation Worship released "Wait On You" which features Dante Bowe and Chandler Moore as the third promotional single from Old Church Basement. Elevation Worship and Maverick City Music released Old Church Basement on April 30, 2021, also releasing the music video for the song "Build Your Church" which features Naomi Raine and Chris Brown, on YouTube. Old Church Basement debuted at number 30 the mainstream Billboard 200 chart, while also charting at number one on the Top Christian Albums chart and the Top Gospel Albums chart in the United States with 19,000 equivalent album units sold in the first week, and 9 tracks from the album also charting in the top 10 sector of the Hot Gospel Songs chart. Old Church Basement also debuted at number two on the Official Christian and Gospel Albums Chart in the United Kingdom. The album also achieved mainstream chart placements in Australia, Canada, New Zealand, and Switzerland. Maverick City Music released "Promises" featuring Joe L. Barnes and Naomi Raine as a single on May 3, 2021. "Promises" reached number one on both the Hot Christian Songs and the Hot Gospel Songs charts. In May 2021, Maverick City Music announced their first headlining tour, dubbed the Welcome to Maverick City Tour, set to visit 12 cities in the United States during the fall of 2021.

On June 2, 2021, Maverick City Music announced that they were preparing for the release of their following project, Jubilee: Juneteenth Edition. On June 4, 2021, Maverick City Music released "Breathe" featuring Jonathan McReynolds and Doe as the lead single from Jubilee: Juneteenth Edition. "Breathe" peaked at number 31 on the Hot Christian Songs chart, and number 10 on the Hot Gospel Songs chart. Jubilee: Juneteenth Edition was released on June 18, 2021, in celebration of Juneteenth, which became an official federal holiday in the United States. Jubilee: Juneteenth Edition debuted at number 8 on Top Christian Albums and number two on Top Gospel Albums in the United States, with 3,000 equivalent album units earned. Jubilee: Juneteenth Edition also debuted at number 5 on the Official Christian and Gospel Albums Chart in the United Kingdom. On July 23, 2021, Maverick City Music alongside Tribl released a collaborative live album named Tribl I. Tribl I debuted at number ten on Top Christian Albums, and number three on Top Gospel Albums, in the United States. On October 1, 2021, Maverick City Music released their second Spanish-language album, Venga Tu Reino. On November 30, 2021, Maverick City Music released their second Christmas recording, A Very Maverick Christmas. A Very Maverick Christmas debuted at number 9 on Top Christian Albums, and number three on Top Gospel Albums, in the United States. A Very Maverick Christmas also debuted at number five on the Official Christian and Gospel Albums Chart in the United Kingdom.

At the 2021 GMA Dove Awards, Maverick City Music received three nominations: New Artist of the Year, Worship Recorded Song of the Year for "Jireh" alongside Elevation Worship, Chandler Moore and Naomi Raine, and Worship Album of the Year for Old Church Basement alongside Elevation Worship; the collective won the GMA Dove Awards for New Artist of the Year and Worship Album of the Year for Old Church Basement with Elevation Worship. At the 2022 Grammy Awards, Maverick City Music received four nominations across the Christian and Gospel categories, ultimately winning the Grammy Award for Best Contemporary Christian Music Album for Old Church Basement with Elevation Worship. Maverick City Music also performed "Jireh" at the 2022 Grammy Awards, becoming the first Christian gospel group to perform at the Grammy Awards show in 20 years. At the 2022 Billboard Music Awards, Maverick City Music received six nominations across the Christian and Gospel categories.

On January 3, 2022, Maverick City Music released "Firm Foundation (He Won't)" featuring Chandler Moore and Cody Carnes as a single. "Firm Foundation (He Won't)" peaked at number 33 on the Hot Christian Songs chart, and at number 10 on the Hot Gospel Songs chart. On February 11, 2022, the collective released the EP Breathe, in commemoration of Black History Month. Breathe debuted at number 16 on Top Christian Albums, and number 4 on Top Gospel Albums, in the United States. In March 2022, Maverick City Music and Kirk Franklin announced that they will be embarking on the Kingdom Tour, with a collaboration album titled Kingdom initially set to be released by the artists following the conclusion of the tour. Maverick City Music released "Worthy of My Song (Worthy of It All)" featuring Phil Wickham, Chandler Moore and the Mav City Gospel Choir as a single on April 8, 2022. "Worthy of My Song (Worthy of It All)" peaked at number 27 on the Hot Christian Songs chart, and at number 11 on the Hot Gospel Songs chart. On April 29, 2022, Maverick City Music and Tribl released their second collaborative live album, Tribl Nights Anthologies. Tribl Nights Anthologies debuted at number 41 on Top Christian Albums, and number six on Top Gospel Albums, in the United States.

On May 20, 2022, Maverick City Music and Kirk Franklin announced that they will release a collaborative album titled Kingdom Book One on June 17, 2022, concurrently releasing "Kingdom" featuring Naomi Raine and Chandler Moore as the first promotional single from the album that same day. "Kingdom" peaked at number 17 on the Hot Christian Songs chart, and at number six on the Hot Gospel Songs chart. On June 3, 2022, "Bless Me" was released by Maverick City Music and Kirk Franklin as the second promotional single from Kingdom Book One. "Bless Me" peaked at number 19 on the Hot Christian Songs chart, and number 8 on the Hot Gospel Songs chart. The collective also featured on "God Really Loves Us" by Crowder and Dante Bowe, a single which was released on June 3, 2022. "God Really Loves Us" peaked at number three on the Hot Christian Songs chart, and number one on the Hot Gospel Songs chart. Maverick City Music released their third Spanish-language album, Simple Adoración, on June 10, 2022. Kingdom Book One was released on June 17, 2022. Kingdom Book One debuted at number 151 on the Billboard 200 chart, while appearing at number two on the Top Christian Albums and the Top Gospel Albums charts in the United States, with 5,000 equivalent album units earned. Kingdom Book One also debuted at number 5 on the Official Christian and Gospel Albums Chart in the United Kingdom. On November 4, 2022, Maverick City Music released the radio version of "Fear Is Not My Future" featuring Brandon Lake and Chandler Moore. "Fear Is Not My Future" peaked at number 13 on the Hot Christian Songs chart, and number 5 on the Hot Gospel Songs chart. "Mary Did You Know?" was released by Maverick City Music to Christian radio in the United States, impacting on November 25, 2022, becoming the first single from A Very Maverick Christmas (2021). "Mary Did You Know?" peaked at number 23 on the Hot Christian Songs chart, and number 11 on the Hot Gospel Songs chart.

On September 26, 2022, Maverick City Music announced via a statement on Instagram that they had paused their professional relationship with Bowe, citing behavior that was inconsistent with their core values and beliefs, the nature of which was not specified. Bowe released a statement of apology, stating that he was receiving counsel and support, while also taking a step back from social media and expressed recommitment to God's purpose for his life.

At the 2022 GMA Dove Awards, Maverick City Music received 7 nominations including Artist of the Year, Worship Recorded Song of the Year for the radio version of "Jireh" alongside Chandler Moore and Naomi Raine, Gospel Worship Recorded Song of the Year for "Breathe" with DOE, Chandler Moore, and Jonathan McReynolds, Contemporary Gospel Album of the Year for Jubilee: Juneteenth Edition, and Gospel Worship Album of the Year for Tribl Nights Atlanta alongside Tribl; the collective ultimately winning the GMA Dove Awards for Gospel Worship Recorded Song of the Year and Gospel Worship Album of the Year.

At the 2023 Grammy Awards, Maverick City Music received 5 nominations across the Christian and Gospel categories: Best Gospel Album for Kingdom Book One (Deluxe) with Kirk Franklin, Best Contemporary Christian Music Album for Breathe, Best Gospel Performance/Song for "Kingdom" with Kirk Franklin, and two Best Contemporary Christian Music Performance/Song nominations for "Fear Is Not My Future" with Kirk Franklin and "God Really Loves Us (Radio Version)" with Crowder and Bowe. The collective ultimately won 4 awards: Best Gospel Album, Best Contemporary Christian Music Album, Best Gospel Performance/Song, and Best Contemporary Christian Music Performance/Song. The four awards tied Beyoncé for most awards won at the 2023 Grammy Awards.

At the 2023 GMA Dove Awards on October 17, 2023, Maverick City Music received three nominations across Christian categories: Contemporary Gospel Recorded Song of the Year for Bless Me with Kirk Franklin, Contemporary Gospel Album of the Year for Kingdom Book One (Deluxe), and Worship Recorded Song of the Year for Fear Is Not My Future featuring Brandon Lake and Chandler Moore. The group eventually won one award: Contemporary Gospel Album of the Year. Following this recognition, Maverick City Music continued their momentum with a series of performances that culminated in The Maverick Way Tour, which spanned multiple cities across various countries during the fall of 2023.

In October 2025, Moore and Raine announced their departure from Maverick City Music in order to focus on their own individual ministries. Chandler Moore filed a lawsuit against the CEO of Maverick City Music, Norman Gyamfi who was at one point Moore's manager. He said that MCM and TRIBL Records owe him more than $800,000 in royalties.

== Discography ==
Albums

- Maverick City Vol. 3 Part 1 (2020)
- Maverick City, Vol. 3 Pt. 2 (2020)
- Como En El Cielo (2021)
- Old Church Basement with Elevation Worship (2021)
- Jubilee: Juneteenth Edition (2021)
- Tribl I with Tribl (2021)
- Venga Tu Reino (2021)
- A Very Maverick Christmas (2021)
- Tribl Nights Anthologies with Tribl (2022)
- Simple Adoración (2022)
- Kingdom Book One with Kirk Franklin (2022)
- The Maverick Way Complete (2023)
- The Maverick Way Reimagined (2024)
- MAVHOUSE with Song House (2024)
- I Was Made to Glorify Your Name with Dante Bowe and Grace Idowu (2026)

Extended plays

- Maverick City, Vol. 1 (2019)
- Maverick City, Vol. 2 (2019)
- You Hold It All Together with Upperroom (2020)
- Maverick City Christmas (2020)
- Move Your Heart with Upperroom (2021)
- Jubilee (2021)
- Breathe (2022)
- The Maverick Way EP (2023)
- Love Made a Way with Dante Bowe (2025)

== Tours ==
- Welcome to Maverick City Tour (2021)
- Kingdom Tour (with Kirk Franklin) (2022)
- The Maverick Way Tour (Fall 2023)
- Kingdom World Tour (with Kirk Franklin) (2024)
- Good News Tour (with Tasha Cobbs Leonard) (2024)

== Awards and nominations ==
=== American Music Awards ===
Year	Award	Nominated work	Result	Ref.
2021	Favorite Artist – Gospel	Themselves	Nominated	
2022	Favorite Gospel Artist	Themselves	Nominated	

=== BET Awards ===
Year	Award	Nominated work	Result	Ref.
2022	Dr. Bobby Jones Best Gospel/Inspirational Award	"Jireh" (with Elevation Worship)	Nominated	
2023	Dr. Bobby Jones Best Gospel/Inspirational Award	"Bless Me" (with Kirk Franklin)	Won	
2023	Dr. Bobby Jones Best Gospel/Inspirational Award	"Kingdom" (with Kirk Franklin, Naomi Raine, and Chandler Moore)	Nominated	
2023	Best Group	Maverick City Music & Kirk Franklin	Nominated	
2024	Best Group	Themselves	Nominated	
2024	Dr. Bobby Jones Best Gospel/Inspiration Award	"God Problems" (with Naomi Raine and Chandler Moore)	Nominated	
2025	Dr. Bobby Jones Best Gospel/Inspiration Award	"Rain Down On Me" (with GloRilla, Kirk Franklin, and Kierra Sheard)	Won	
2025	Dr. Bobby Jones Best Gospel/Inspiration Award	"Constant" (with Jordin Sparks and Chandler Moore)	Nominated	
2025	Best Group	Themselves	Nominated	

=== Billboard Music Awards ===
Year	Award	Nominated work	Result	Ref.
2021	Top Gospel Artist	Themselves	Nominated	
2021	Top Gospel Album	Maverick City Vol. 3 Part 1	Won	
2021	Top Gospel Album	Maverick City, Vol. 3 Part 2	Nominated	
2022	Top Gospel Artist	Themselves	Nominated	
2022	Top Christian Album	Old Church Basement (with Elevation Worship)	Nominated	
2022	Top Gospel Album	Old Church Basement (with Elevation Worship)	Nominated	
2022	Top Gospel Album	Jubilee: Juneteenth Edition	Nominated	
2022	Top Gospel Album	Move Your Heart (with Upperroom)	Nominated	
2022	Top Gospel Song	"Jireh" (with Elevation Worship featuring Chandler Moore and Naomi Raine)	Nominated	

=== GMA Dove Awards ===
Year	Award	Nominated work	Result	Ref.
2020	Gospel Worship Recorded Song of the Year	"Promises"	Nominated	
2020	Gospel Worship Album of the Year	Maverick City Vol. 3 Part 1	Nominated	
2021	New Artist of the Year	Themselves	Won	
2021	Worship Recorded Song of the Year	"Jireh" (with Elevation Worship featuring Chandler Moore and Naomi Raine)	Nominated	
2021	Worship Album of the Year	Old Church Basement (with Elevation Worship)	Won	
2022	Artist of the Year	Themselves	Nominated	
2022	Gospel Worship Recorded Song of the Year	"Breathe" (featuring DOE, Jonathan McReynolds and Chandler Moore)	Won	
2022	Worship Recorded Song of the Year	"Jireh - Radio Version" (featuring Chandler Moore and Naomi Raine)	Nominated	
2022	Contemporary Gospel Album of the Year	Jubilee: Juneteenth Edition	Nominated	
2022	Gospel Worship Album of the Year	Tribl Nights Atlanta (with Tribl)	Won	
2022	Spanish Language Album of the Year	Venga Tu Reino (with Maverick City Música)	Nominated	
2022	Christmas/Special Event Album of the Year	A Very Maverick Christmas	Nominated	
2023	Contemporary Gospel Recorded Song of the Year	"Bless Me" (with Kirk Franklin)	Nominated	
2023	Contemporary Gospel Album of the Year	Kingdom Book One (Deluxe)	Won	
2023	Worship Recorded Song of the Year	"Fear Is Not My Future" (featuring Brandon Lake and Chandler Moore)	Nominated	
2024	Gospel Worship Album of the Year	The Maverick Way Complete (with Naomi Raine & Chandler Moore)	Nominated	
2024	Contemporary Gospel Recorded Song of the Year	"God Problems" (with Naomi Raine and Chandler Moore)	Won	
2025	Contemporary Gospel Recorded Song of the Year	"In the Room (Afro Beat Version)"	Nominated	
2025	Gospel Worship Album of the Year	The Maverick Way Reimagined	Nominated	

=== Grammy Awards ===
Year	Award	Nominated work	Result	Ref.
2022	Best Gospel Performance/Song	"Wait on You" (with Elevation Worship)	Nominated	
2022	Best Gospel Album	Jubilee: Juneteenth Edition	Nominated	
2022	Best Contemporary Christian Music Performance/Song	"Jireh" (with Elevation Worship featuring Chandler Moore and Naomi Raine)	Nominated	
2022	Best Contemporary Christian Music Album	Old Church Basement (with Elevation Worship)	Won	
2023	Best Gospel Performance/Song	"Kingdom" (with Kirk Franklin)	Won	
2023	Best Gospel Album	Kingdom Book One (with Kirk Franklin)	Won	
2023	Best Contemporary Christian Music Performance/Song	"God Really Loves Us (Radio Version)" (Crowder featuring Dante Bowe and Maverick City Music)	Nominated	
2023	Best Contemporary Christian Music Performance/Song	"Fear Is Not My Future" (with Kirk Franklin)	Won	
2023	Best Contemporary Christian Music Album	Breathe	Won	
2024	Best Gospel Album	The Maverick Way	Nominated	
2024	Best Contemporary Christian Music Performance/Song	"God Problems"	Nominated	
2025	Best Contemporary Christian Music Performance/Song	"In The Room" (with Naomi Raine, Chandler Moore, and Tasha Cobbs Leonard)	Nominated	
2025	Best Contemporary Christian Music Performance/Song	"In The Name of Jesus" (with JWLKRS Worship and Chandler Moore)	Nominated	
2025	Best Contemporary Christian Music Album	The Maverick Way Complete (with Naomi Raine & Chandler Moore)	Nominated	

=== NAACP Image Awards ===
Year	Award	Nominated work	Result	Ref.
2023	Outstanding Gospel/Christian Album	Kingdom Book One (with Kirk Franklin)	Won	
2024	Outstanding Gospel/Christian Album	The Maverick Way Complete (with Naomi Raine & Chandler Moore)	Nominated	
2024	Outstanding Gospel/Christian Song	"In The Room"	Nominated	
2025	Outstanding Gospel/Christian Song	"God Problems (Not By Power)" (with Miles Minnick)	Nominated	
2025	Outstanding Duo, Group or Collaboration (Traditional)	"God Problems (Not By Power)" (with Miles Minnick)	Nominated	
2025	Outstanding Duo, Group or Collaboration (Contemporary)	"Rain Down On Me" (with GloRilla, Kirk Franklin, Kierra Sheard, and Chandler Moore)	Nominated	
2025	Outstanding Gospel/Christian Album	The Maverick Way Reimagined	Nominated	
2026	Outstanding Gospel/Christian Album	Live at Maverick City	Nominated	
2026	Outstanding Gospel/Christian Song	"Constant (Live)" (with Jordin Sparks, Chandler Moore, Anthony Gargiulo)	Nominated	

=== Soul Train Music Awards ===
Year	Award	Nominated work	Result	Ref.
2021	Best Gospel/Inspirational Award	Themselves	Nominated	
2022	Best Gospel/Inspirational Award	Maverick City Music x Kirk Franklin	Won	

== See also ==
- List of Christian worship music artists
