= List of Billboard Top Christian Albums number ones of the 2020s =

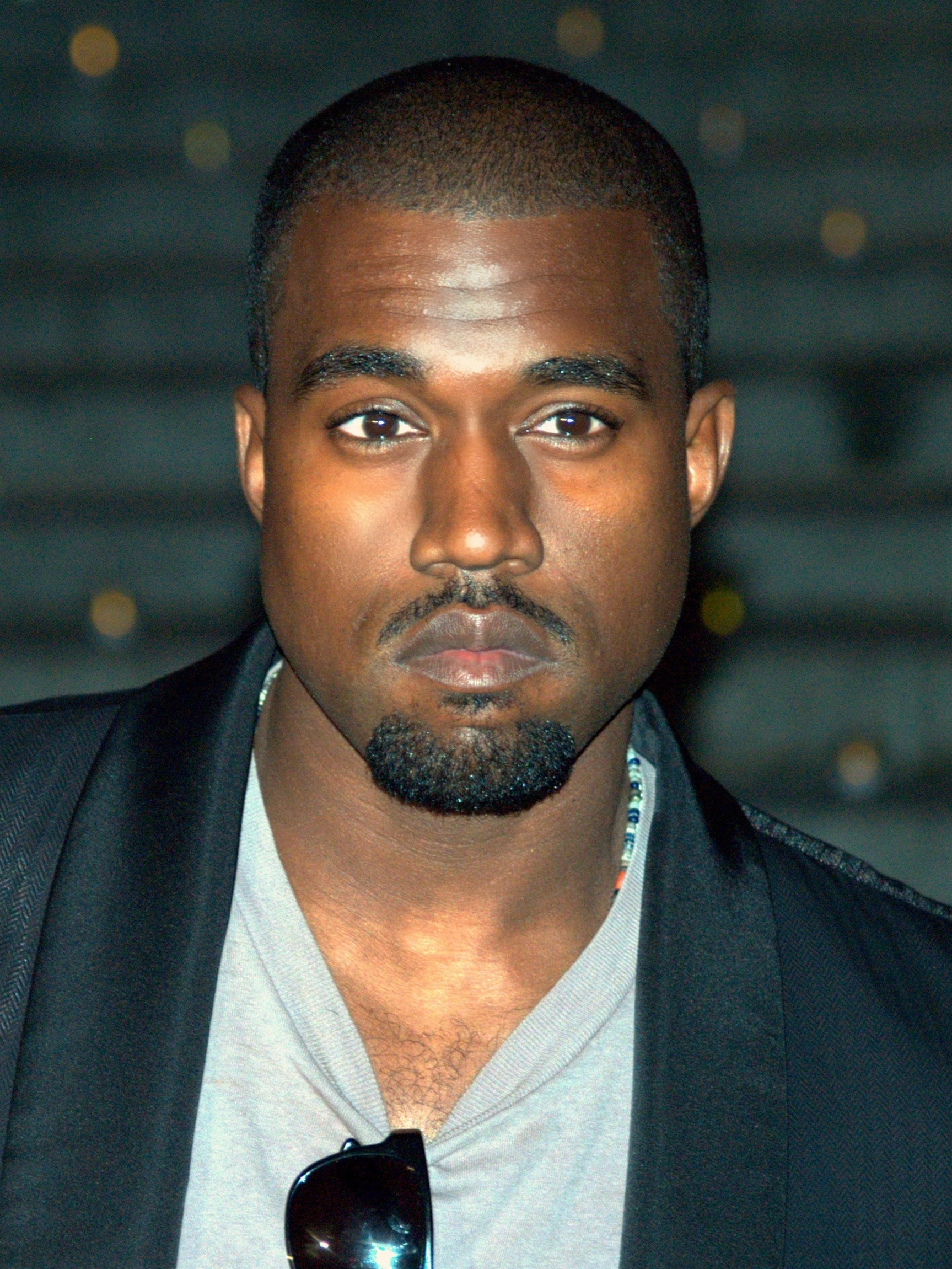
Kanye West (pictured in 2009) has placed most weeks atop the chart in the 2020s with 99 weeks.

The Top Christian Albums chart is a record chart compiled by Billboard magazine, ranking the week's best-performing Christian albums in the United States. Like the Billboard 200, the data is compiled by Nielsen Soundscan based on each album's weekly physical and digital sales, as well as on-demand streaming and digital sales of its individual tracks.

== Number ones ==
Issue date	Album	Artist(s)	Wks.
January 4, 2020	Look Up Child	Lauren Daigle	1
January 11, 2020	Jesus Is King	Kanye West	1
January 18, 2020	Look Up Child	Lauren Daigle	13
April 18, 2020	Guardians	August Burns Red	1
April 25, 2020	Look Up Child	Lauren Daigle	3
May 16, 2020	Graves into Gardens	Elevation Worship	1
May 23, 2020	Look Up Child	Lauren Daigle	5
June 27, 2020	Graves into Gardens	Elevation Worship	1
July 4, 2020	Look Up Child	Lauren Daigle	6
August 15, 2020	Chris Tomlin & Friends	Chris Tomlin	1
August 22, 2020	Look Up Child	Lauren Daigle	2
September 5, 2020	Restoration	Lecrae	1
September 12, 2020	Out of Body	Needtobreathe	1
September 19, 2020	Even the Devil Believes	Stryper	1
September 26, 2020	Look Up Child	Lauren Daigle	1
October 3, 2020	The Path	Fit for a King	1
October 10, 2020	My Gift	Carrie Underwood	14
January 16, 2021	Look Up Child	Lauren Daigle	12
April 10, 2021	My Savior	Carrie Underwood	5
May 15, 2021	Old Church Basement	Elevation Worship and Maverick City Music	1
May 22, 2021	My Savior	Carrie Underwood	1
May 29, 2021	Old Church Basement	Elevation Worship and Maverick City Music	3
June 19, 2021	Look Up Child	Lauren Daigle	1
June 26, 2021	Milk & Honey	Crowder	1
July 3, 2021	Old Church Basement	Elevation Worship and Maverick City Music	1
July 10, 2021	Hymn of Heaven	Phil Wickham	1
July 17, 2021	Look Up Child	Lauren Daigle	3
August 7, 2021	My Savior	Carrie Underwood	1
August 14, 2021	Into the Mystery	Needtobreathe	1
August 21, 2021	My Savior	Carrie Underwood	1
August 28, 2021	Look Up Child	Lauren Daigle	1
September 4, 2021	Jesus People	Danny Gokey	1
September 11, 2021	Donda	Kanye West	14
December 18, 2021	My Gift	Carrie Underwood	3
January 8, 2022	Donda	Kanye West	11
March 26, 2022	What Are We Waiting For?	For King & Country	1
April 2, 2022	Donda	Kanye West	5
May 7, 2022	My Jesus	Anne Wilson	1
May 14, 2022	Donda	Kanye West	16
September 3, 2022	Life After Death	Toby Mac	1
September 10, 2022	Healer	Casting Crowns	1
September 17, 2022	Donda	Kanye West	7
November 5, 2022	Always Only Jesus	MercyMe	1
November 12, 2022	Donda	Kanye West	4
December 10, 2022	Christmas Eve and Other Stories	Trans-Siberian Orchestra	5
January 14, 2023	Donda	Kanye West	7
March 4, 2023	My Story Your Glory	Matthew West	1
March 11, 2023	Donda	Kanye West	4
April 8, 2023	Look Up Child	Lauren Daigle	2
April 22, 2023	Donda	Kanye West	5
May 27, 2023	Lauren Daigle	Lauren Daigle	1
June 3, 2023	Can You Imagine?	Elevation Worship	1
June 10, 2023	Donda	Kanye West	12
September 2, 2023	I Believe	Phil Wickham	1
September 9, 2023	Donda	Kanye West	2
September 23, 2023	Lauren Daigle	Lauren Daigle	1
September 30, 2023	Caves	Needtobreathe	1
October 7, 2023	Donda	Kanye West	2
October 21, 2023	Seasons	Natalie Grant	1
October 28, 2023	Donda	Kanye West	1
November 4, 2023	Coat of Many Colors	Brandon Lake	1
November 11, 2023	The Maverick Way Complete: Complete Vol 02	Maverick City Music, Chandler Moore and Naomi Raine	3
December 2, 2023	Christmas Eve and Other Stories	Trans-Siberian Orchestra	6
January 13, 2024	Donda	Kanye West	8
March 9, 2024	Can You Imagine?	Elevation Worship	8
May 4, 2024	Rebel	Anne Wilson	1
May 11, 2024	More Than This	CeCe Winans	1
May 18, 2024	Rebel	Anne Wilson	2
June 1, 2024	Overflow: The Album	Transformation Worship	1
June 8, 2024	The Prodigal	Josiah Queen	1
June 15, 2024	The Exile	Crowder	1
June 22, 2024	Can You Imagine?	Elevation Worship	5
July 27, 2024	When Wind Meets Fire	Elevation Worship	2
August 10, 2024	Child of God	Forrest Frank	17
December 14, 2024	Christmas Eve and Other Stories	Trans-Siberian Orchestra	1
December 21, 2024	A Drummer Boy Christmas	For King & Country	2
January 4, 2025	Christmas Eve and Other Stories	Trans-Siberian Orchestra	1
January 11, 2025	Child of God	Forrest Frank	10
March 22, 2025	Heaven on My Mind	tobyMac	1
March 29, 2025	Child of God	Forrest Frank	7
May 24, 2025	Child of God II	Forrest Frank	5
June 28, 2025	King of Hearts	Brandon Lake	3
July 19, 2025	Child of God	Forrest Frank	1
July 26, 2025	Child of God II	Forrest Frank	4
August 23, 2025	Child of God	Forrest Frank	2
September 6, 2025	Mt. Zion	Josiah Queen	1
September 13, 2025	Child of God II	Forrest Frank	14
December 27, 2025	A Drummer Boy Christmas	For King & Country	2
January 10, 2026	Child of God II	Forrest Frank	8
March 7, 2026	So Be It	Elevation Worship	1
March 14, 2026	Child of God II	Forrest Frank	34
October 31, 2026	So Be It	Elevation Worship	1
November 7, 2026	Damascus Road	Josiah Queen	2

== See also ==
- Top Christian Albums
