= Here's to the Ones =

Studio album by Rhett Walker Band
- Released: October 14, 2014
- Studio: The Smoakstack (Nashville, Tennessee); Ed's (Franklin, Tennessee)
- Genre: Contemporary Christian music, Christian rock, Southern rock
- Length: 44:00
- Label: Essential
- Producer: Ed Cash, Paul Moak, Rhett Walker Band

Rhett Walker Band chronology
Come to the River (2012)	Here's to the Ones (2014)	Good To Me (2020)

Here's to the Ones marks the second album from Rhett Walker Band. Essential Records released the project on October 14, 2014. Rhett Walker Band worked with producers Ed Cash and Paul Moak to create the album.

== Reception ==
Professional ratings
Review scores
Source	Rating
365 Days of Inspiring Media	4/5 stars
CCM Magazine	4/5 stars
Christ Core	8.0/10
Christian Music Review	5.0/5
Cross Rhythms	8/10 squares
Jesus Freak Hideout	4/5 stars

Signaling in a four star out of five review for CCM Magazine, Andy Argyrakis citing, the band are "Tossing a little more fuel on the southern-fried gives Rhett Walker Band's sophomore project more gusto than its already heralded 2012 debut Come To The River." In tandem with the four star rating, Jesus Freak Hideout's Alex Caldwell recognizing, "Here's To The Ones is a rare treat in that both the music and the message sound equally authentic, and shows that Walker, in all his grittiness and imperfections, still has his focus in the right place." Tim Holden, writing for Cross Rhythms in an eight out of ten review, emphasizing, "Rhett Walker Band's second record label album outing continues the gritty Southern rock sound with attitude... If it is rock with more than a hint of southern flavour and a bit of spiritual meat to the lyrics you're looking for, then 'Here's To The Ones' is definitely an album to get hold of." Awarding the album four stars from 365 Days of Inspiring Media, Joshua Andre writes, "Rhett Walker Band have released a sophomore album that exceeds my expectations, as there’s plenty of genres encompassed here, enough to make most people happy." Jackie Labuguen, rating the album 5.0 out of five for Christian Music Review, says, "Here's To The Ones, is sure to elicit a strong positive response from their audience." Awarding the album an eight out of ten from Christ Core, Jacob Neff writes, "Here's To The Ones is an ode to living life to the fullest, hearts full of love and amazed at the grace and mercy of our God, for as long as we’re on this earth."

== Track listing ==
Standard edition
No.	Title	Writer(s)	Length
1.	"Clone"	Kenny Davis, Joe Kane, Rhett Walker	4:53
2.	"Here's to the Ones"	Kenny Davis, Joe Kane, Paul Moak, Rhett Walker	3:59
3.	"Love Like Jesus"	Blake Bolinger, Jon Mabe, Matt Maher, Rhett Walker	3:19
4.	"Adam's Son"	Kenny Davis, Joe Kane, Rhett Walker	3:04
5.	"Dead Man"	Kenny Davis, Joe Kane, Rhett Walker	3:59
6.	"The Mystery"	Kenny Davis, Joe Kane, Rhett Walker	4:02
7.	"The Other Side"	Paul Moak, Allen Salmon, Rhett Walker	4:59
8.	"Amazed"	Michael Farren, Seth Mosley, Rhett Walker	3:31
9.	"Better Part of Me"	Kenny Davis, Joe Kane, Blake Neesmith, Rhett Walker	3:47
10.	"Someone Else's Song"	Kenny Davis, Joe Kane, Rhett Walker	4:59
11.	"Broken Man"	Kenny Davis, Jeff Pardo, Rhett Walker	3:28
Total length:			44:00

Deluxe edition
No.	Title	Writer(s)	Length
12.	"Lift Me Up"	Kenny Davis, Joe Kane, Allen Salmon, Rhett Walker	4:50
13.	"Welcome Home"	Kenny Davis, Joe Kane, Rhett Walker	3:38
14.	"Takin' Care of Business"	Randy Bachman	6:00
15.	"Gonna Be Alright" (live)	Allen Salmon, Rhett Walker	4:48
Total length:			63:33

== Personnel ==
Rhett Walker Band

- Rhett Walker – lead vocals, acoustic guitar, electric guitar
- Joe Kane – acoustic guitar, electric guitar, slide guitar, banjo, mandolin, vocals
- Kevin Whitsett – bass guitar, upright bass, vocals
- Kenny Davis – guitars, drums, percussion, vocals

Additional musicians

- Paul Moak – acoustic piano, Hammond B3 organ, acoustic guitar, electric guitar, banjo, mandolin, pedal steel guitar, percussion, vocals
- Scotty Wilbanks – Hammond B3 organ (3)
- Jason Webb – Hammond B3 organ (8)
- Pastor Mark Canipe – intro (1)
- Ed Cash – backing vocals (3, 8)

Production

- Paul Moak – producer (1, 2, 4, 5, 6, 9–14), engineer (1, 2, 4, 5, 6, 7, 9–14), mixing (14)
- Ed Cash – producer (3, 8), engineer (3, 8), mixing (3, 8)
- Seth Mosley – additional production (3, 8)
- Rhett Walker Band – producers (7, 15)
- Joe Kane – mixing (1, 2, 4, 5, 6, 7, 9–13, 15)
- Justin March – assistant engineer (1, 2, 4, 5, 6, 7, 9–14)
- Devin Vaughan – assistant engineer (1, 2, 4, 5, 6, 7, 9–14)
- Max Corwin – assistant engineer (1, 2, 4, 5, 6, 7, 9–14)
- Zack Zinck – assistant engineer (1, 2, 4, 5, 6, 7, 9–14)
- Ryan Meadoo – assistant engineer (3, 8)
- Cody Norris – assistant engineer (3, 8)
- Brad Blackwood – mastering at Euphonic Masters (Memphis, Tennessee)
- Jason Root – A&R production
- Lani Crump – production coordinator
- Beth Lee – art direction
- Tim Parker – art direction, design
- Joshua Black Wilkins – photography
- Kelly Henderson – hair stylist, make-up
- Stephanie Harrison – wardrobe assistant

== Charts ==
Chart performance for Here's to the Ones
Chart (2014)	Peak position
US Billboard 200	183
US Christian Albums (Billboard)	12
