= My Jesus =

My Jesus may refer to:

- My Jesus (album), a 2022 studio album by Anne Wilson
  - "My Jesus" (song), a 2021 song by Anne Wilson, title track of the album
- My Jesus (Live in Nashville), a 2021 EP by Anne Wilson
- "My Jesus", a song by Leeland from Love Is on the Move
- "My Jesus", a song by Todd Agnew from Reflection of Something
