= Sunday Sermons =

2022 single by Anne Wilson

Single by Anne Wilson

from the album My Jesus
- Released: January 14, 2022
- Length: 3:20
- Label: Sparrow; Capitol CMG
- Songwriters: Anne Wilson; Jeff Sojka; Ben Glover
- Producers: Jeff Sojka; Ben Glover

Anne Wilson singles chronology
"Emmannuel God With Us" (2021)	"Sunday Sermons" (2022)	"Me on Your Mind" (2022)

Music videos
- "Sunday Sermons" on YouTube
- "Sunday Sermons" (Acoustic) on YouTube
- "Sunday Sermons" (Lyrics) on YouTube

"Sunday Sermons" is a song by American contemporary Christian music singer Anne Wilson. It was released on January 14, 2022, as the second single from her debut studio album, My Jesus (2022). Wilson co-wrote the song with Ben Glover and Jeff Sojka.

"Sunday Sermons" peaked at number five on the US Hot Christian Songs chart.

== Background ==
On January 10, 2022, Anne Wilson announced that will be releasing a new single titled "Sunday Sermons" on January 14, availing the song for digital pre-order and also offering fans a snippet of the song to be sent via text message. "Sunday Sermons" was released on January 14, 2022, accompanied with a lyric video of the song. "Sunday Sermons" follows the release of her debut single "My Jesus" and the holiday-themed single "I Still Believe in Christmas" in 2021.

Anne Wilson shared the story behind the song, saying:

This is my story of growing up in the church since I was a little girl. God used every Sunday sermon to develop a firm foundation in Him. I didn't realize just how deep my roots were in Him from all those years of showing up to church each Sunday until I encountered hardships in my life. No matter what happens in life - even losing a loved one, I can always go back to that foundation of truth that the Lord planted in me through each of those sermons. This song is to remind you to cling to the One who's consistent and faithful. Jesus loves you more than you could ever imagine.

== Composition ==
"Sunday Sermons" is composed in the key of C with a tempo of 98 beats per minute and a musical time signature of 4/4.

== Reception ==
=== Critical response ===
Jonathan Andre of 365 Days of Inspiring Media gave a positive review of "Sunday Sermons", saying: "the song is a reminder that we must not place tremendous importance on the big moment in someone's life, that just because someone has a 'w0ow' moment and they come to Christ in a profound way, doesn't mean that someone else's experience of growing up in a Christian home and becoming a Christian that way, is anything less than valid."

=== Accolades ===
Year-end lists
Publication	Accolade	Rank	Ref.
Jesus Freak Hideout	2022 Staff Picks: Alex Caldwell's Song Picks	6	

== Chart performance ==
"Sunday Sermons" debuted at number 38 on the US Hot Christian Songs chart dated January 29, 2022, concurrently charting at number three on the Christian Digital Song Sales chart.

"Sunday Sermons" made its debut at number 24 on the US Christian Airplay chart dated February 5, 2022, being the highest ranking debut that week.

== Music videos ==
On January 14, 2022, Anne Wilson released the official lyric video for the song. On March 4, 2022, Anne Wilson released the official music video for "Sunday Sermons". On June 16, 2022, Anne Wilson released the official acoustic performance video for "Sunday Sermons".

== Personnel ==
Adapted from AllMusic.

- Dallan Beck — editing
- Ben Glover — acoustic guitar, background vocals, electric guitar, engineer, keyboards, producer, programmer
- Lindsay Glover — background vocals
- Mark Hill — bass
- Willie “the Fish” Johnson — background vocals
- Joe LaPorta — mastering engineer
- Jerry McPherson — electric guitar
- Sean Moffitt — mixing
- Gordon Mote — Hammond B3, piano
- Randy Poole — engineer
- Jeff Sojka — background vocals, drums, engineer, keyboards, producer, programmer
- Demaryius Thomas — African Percussion
- Anne Wilson — primary artist, background vocals

== Charts ==
=== Weekly charts ===
Weekly chart performance for "Sunday Sermons"
Chart (2022)	Peak position
US Christian Songs (Billboard)	5
US Christian Airplay (Billboard)	4
US Christian AC (Billboard)	6

=== Year-end charts ===
Year-end chart performance for "Sunday Sermons"
Chart (2022)	Position
US Christian Songs (Billboard)	18
US Christian Airplay (Billboard)	17
US Christian AC (Billboard)	18

== Certifications ==
Region	Certification	Certified units/sales
United States (RIAA)	Platinum	1,000,000^{‡}
^{‡} Sales+streaming figures based on certification alone.

== Release history ==
Release dates and formats for "Sunday Sermons"
Region	Date	Format	Label	Ref.
Various	January 14, 2022	Digital download; streaming	Sparrow; Capitol CMG	
United States	February 4, 2022	Christian radio	Sparrow; Capitol CMG	
