= My Jesus (Live in Nashville) =

2021 EP by Anne Wilson

EP by Anne Wilson
- Released: August 6, 2021
- Recorded: 2021
- Venue: White Dove Barn, Nashville, Tennessee, U.S
- Genre: CCM; Christian country
- Length: 18:12
- Label: Sparrow; Capitol CMG
- Producer: Jeff Pardo

Anne Wilson chronology
My Jesus (Live in Nashville) (2021)	My Jesus (2022)

My Jesus (Live in Nashville) is the debut extended play (EP) by American contemporary Christian music singer Anne Wilson, which was released via Capitol Christian Music Group on August 6, 2021. Jeff Pardo handled the production of the EP.

The EP peaked at number twelve on the Top Christian Albums chart in the United States.

== Background ==
On June 18, 2021, Anne Wilson announced that she will release My Jesus (Live in Nashville) on August 6, 2021, a live extended play supporting the multi-track single "My Jesus" released in April 2021. The EP was recorded live at the White Dove Barn in Nashville, Tennessee, and contains five tracks and includes the three songs previously released by Wilson on the multi-track single as well as a new song, "No Place Like Home," and a cover of Little Big Town's "Boondocks." Wilson shared the story behind the EP, saying:

I really wanted to have another opportunity to present [my first EP] in a different way. To share the three songs that were released, and then also to add a couple of new ones. So we're doing a cover of "Boondocks" by Little Big Town—that is one of my favorite songs of all time. I wanted to incorporate my Kentucky roots and my country roots into this live EP while keeping the focus on the Lord, but also showing where I'm from. "Boondocks" was the perfect song for that. Then I am also releasing a new song in the live EP titled "No Place Like Home," which is a song about me and my brother and our memories together at our granddad’s farm. That's definitely what I'm most excited about, and that's a part of the reason why I wanted to do the live EP was so that I could bring that song out and release it to the world. I've been holding on to it for a while, and so I’m super excited to let the world hear that song.

== Reception ==
=== Critical response ===
Professional ratings
Review scores
Source	Rating
365 Days of Inspiring Media	5/5
Today's Christian Entertainment	5/5

Joshua Andre in his 365 Days of Inspiring Media review, applauded Wilson for the EP, saying: "we are met with a vibrant, emotive, personal and honest batch of songs, where Anne delivers her already previously released three singles with intense passion, as well as an all-new track "No Place Like Home" and a cover of Little Big Town's "Boondocks"." Mercedes Rich, indicating in a favourable review at Today's Christian Entertainment, said: "This whole EP goes to show that Christian music can expand through many genres and still worship God. This whole extended play lets Anne Wilson’s personality shine through in her music."

=== Accolades ===
Year-end lists
Publication	Accolade	Rank	Ref.
365 Days of Inspiring Media	Top 25 EPs of 2021	7	

== Commercial performance ==
In the United States, My Jesus (Live in Nashville) debuted at number seventeen on the Billboard's Top Christian Albums Chart dated August 21, 2021.

== Track listing ==
My Jesus (Live in Nashville) — Standard edition
No.	Title	Writer(s)	Length
1.	"Devil" (live)	Anne Wilson; Jeff Pardo	3:20
2.	"My Jesus" (live)	Wilson; Pardo; Matthew West	3:35
3.	"Something About That Name"	Wilson; Colby Wedgeworth; Ethan Hulse	3:28
4.	"Boondocks" (live; Little Big Town cover)	Jimi Westbrook; Karen Fairchild; Kimberly Schlapman; Phillip Sweet; Wayne Kirkpatrick	3:18
5.	"No Place Like Home" (live)	Wilson; Pardo; West	4:31
Total length:			18:12

My Jesus (Live in Nashville) — Apple Music bonus video content
No.	Title	Length
6.	"My Jesus" (live from Nashville, TN/2021)	3:38
7.	"Devil" (live in Nashville, TN/2021)	3:16
Total length:		25:06

== Personnel ==
Adapted from AllMusic.

- Jacob Arnold — drums
- Josh Bailey — A&R
- Rich Brinsfield — bass
- Court Clement — electric guitar
- Alex Dobbert — mastering
- Nathan Dugger — acoustic guitar
- Jason Eskridge — background vocals
- Ainslie Grosser — editing, mixing, recording
- Dwan Hill — keyboards
- Jeff Pardo — producer
- Kiely Phillips — background vocals
- Matt Podesla — electric guitar
- Sarah Lindsay Pogue — A&R
- Anne Wilson — primary artist, vocals

== Charts ==
=== Weekly charts ===
Weekly chart performance for My Jesus (Live in Nashville)
Chart (2021)	Peak position
US Top Christian Albums (Billboard)	12
US Heatseekers Albums (Billboard)	19

=== Year-end charts ===
Year-end chart performance for My Jesus (Live in Nashville)
Chart (2021)	Position
US Christian Albums (Billboard)	60
Chart (2022)	Position
US Christian Albums (Billboard)	68

== Release history ==
Release dates and formats for My Jesus (Live in Nashville)
Region	Date	Format	Label	Ref.
Various	August 6, 2021	Digital download; streaming	Sparrow Records; Capitol Christian Music Group	
Various	October 1, 2021	CD	Sparrow Records; Capitol Christian Music Group	
