= Hey Girl (Anne Wilson song) =

2022 single by Anne Wilson

Single by Anne Wilson

from the album My Jesus
- Released: September 16, 2022
- Genre: CCM
- Length: 3:08
- Label: Sparrow; Capitol CMG
- Songwriters: Anne Wilson; Jeff Pardo; Matthew West
- Producer: Jeff Pardo

Anne Wilson singles chronology
| "Behold" (2022) | "Hey Girl" (2022) | "Living Water" (2023) |

Music videos
- "Hey Girl" on YouTube
- "Hey Girl" (Lyrics) on YouTube

"Hey Girl" is a song by American contemporary Christian music singer Anne Wilson. It was released to Christian radio in the United States on September 16, 2022, as the third single from her debut studio album, My Jesus (2022). Wilson co-wrote the song with Jeff Pardo and Matthew West.

"Hey Girl" peaked at number 26 on the US Hot Christian Songs chart.

== Background ==
"Hey Girl" was released as the first promotional single from the album on March 4, 2022, concurrently launching the album's pre-order. The song impacted Christian radio in the United States on September 16, 2022, becoming the third single from the album. On September 23, 2022, Anne Wilson released a multi-track single of "Hey Girl" containing three new versions of the song.

== Writing and development ==
Anne Wilson had an interview with Kevin Davis, lead contributor at NewReleaseToday about the song and the inspiration behind it. Davis asked about the personal story behind the song, to which Wilson responded, saying:

Over the past year and a half, I've struggled a lot with putting my identity in what the world says about me, instead of who the Lord has called me to be. I wanted to write a song that would speak to women walking through the same struggles. I hope this song reminds you of your worth in Jesus!

– Anne Wilson, NewReleaseToday

== Critical reception ==
Jonathan Andre of 365 Days of Inspiring Media gave a positive review of "Hey Girl", describing it as "an anthem for girls everywhere as the track reminds each of us, especially girls, about who they are and their identity in Christ" and compared it to the song "Overwhelming Child of God" by Carman. Jesus Freak Hideout's Josh Balogh wrote a favourable review of the song, calling it "a playful earworm calling women to see themselves as God does."

== Composition ==
"Hey Girl" is composed in the key of C with a tempo of 75 beats per minute and a musical time signature of 4/4.

== Commercial performance ==
"Hey Girl" debuted at number 30 on the US Hot Christian Songs chart dated May 7, 2022.

"Hey Girl" made its debut at number 45 on the US Christian Airplay chart dated October 1, 2022.

== Music videos ==
On March 3, 2022, Anne Wilson released the official lyric video for the song. On September 8, 2022, Anne Wilson released the official music video for "Hey Girl".

== Track listing ==
All tracks were produced by Jeff Pardo except where stated.

"Hey Girl" — EP
| No. | Title | Producer(s) | Length |
|---|---|---|---|
| 1. | "Hey Girl" | | 3:09 |
| 2. | "Hey Girl" (Kentucky Version) | | 3:10 |
| 3. | "Hey Girl" (Live from Rock the South) | Mitch Parks; Dan Alber | 3:38 |
| 4. | "Hey Girl" (Radio Version) | | 3:04 |
| Total length: | | | 13:01 |

== Charts ==
Chart performance for "Hey Girl"
| Chart (2022) | Peak position |
|---|---|
| US Christian Songs (Billboard) | 26 |
| US Christian Airplay (Billboard) | 21 |
| US Christian AC (Billboard) | 19 |

== Release history ==
Release dates and formats for "Hey Girl"
| Region | Date | Format | Label | Ref. |
|---|---|---|---|---|
| United States | September 16, 2022 | Christian radio | Sparrow; Capitol CMG | |
| Various | September 23, 2022 | Digital download; streaming; (EP) | Sparrow; Capitol CMG | |
