= Come to the River =

Studio album by Rhett Walker Band
- Released: July 10, 2012
- Recorded: The Smoakstack
- Genres: Christian alternative rock, Southern rock
- Length: 36:58
- Label: Essential
- Producer: Paul Moak

Rhett Walker Band chronology
| Come to the River (2012) | The Other Sides - EP (2012) |

Come to the River is the first studio album by Rhett Walker Band. The album was released on July 10, 2012 by Essential Records. The album was produced by Paul Moak at The Smoakstack. The album debuted at No. 9 and No. 154 on the Christian and Heatseekers albums charts, respectively. The lead single from the album is "When Mercy Found Me", which has had chart success, and was primarily on Christian-based charts.

== Track listing ==
Tracklist
| No. | Title | Writer(s) | Length |
|---|---|---|---|
| 1. | "Gonna Be Alright" | Allen Salmon, Rhett Walker | 3:34 |
| 2. | "Come to the River" | Salmon, Walker | 3:28 |
| 3. | "Make Me New" | Salmon, Walker | 3:02 |
| 4. | "When Mercy Found Me" | Jeff Pardo, Walker | 3:58 |
| 5. | "Get Up Get Out" | Ben Glover, Rob Hawkins, Walker | 3:21 |
| 6. | "All I Need" | Jason Ingram, Walker | 3:46 |
| 7. | "Brother" | Pardo, Walker | 4:36 |
| 8. | "Can't Break Me" | Paul Moak, Kenny Davis, Walker | 3:19 |
| 9. | "Vessel" | Walker | 3:52 |
| 10. | "Singing Stone" | Steven Delopoulos, Walker | 4:04 |
| Total length: | | | 36:58 |

== Personnel ==
Rhett Walker Band

- Rhett Walker – vocals, acoustic guitar, electric guitars
- Joe Kane – acoustic guitar, electric guitars, banjo, gang vocals
- Kevin Whitsett – bass
- Kenny Davis – drums, percussion, gang vocals

Additional musicians

- Paul Moak – acoustic piano, Wurlitzer electric piano, pads, Hammond B3 organ, acoustic guitar, electric guitars, baritone guitar, tenor guitar, banjo, mandolin, backing vocals, gang vocals
- Jerry McPherson – acoustic guitar, electric guitars, gang vocals
- Tony Lucido – bass, pad, gang vocals
- David Leonard – vocals (7)
- Leslie Jordan – vocals (10)
- Joe Shirk - keyboards (8)

Production

- Paul Moak – producer, engineer
- Justin March – assistant engineer
- Dewey Boyd – assistant engineer
- Devin Vaughan – assistant engineer
- Dustin Burnett – mixing at Burnett House
- Brad Blackwood – mastering at Euphonic Masters (Memphis, Tennessee)
- Blaine Barcus – A&R
- Jason Root – A&R production
- Beth Lee – art direction
- Tim Parker – art direction, design
- Joshua Black Wilkins – photography
- Kelly Henderson – hair stylist, make-up
- Tabitha Sha Moak – wardrobe
- Mo Thieman – management
- Andrew Patton and Patton House Entertainment – management

== Charts ==
=== Album ===
| Chart (2012) | Peak position |
|---|---|
| US Billboard Christian Albums | 9 |
| US Billboard Heatseekers Albums | 154 |

== Critical reception ==
Professional ratings
Review scores
| Source | Rating |
|---|---|
| AllMusic | 3/5 stars |
| CCM Magazine | 5/5 stars |
| Christian Manifesto | 5/5 stars |
| Christian Music Zine | 4.5/5 stars |
| Christianity Today | 3/5 stars |
| Cross Rhythms | 8/10 stars |
| Indie Vision Music | 3/5 stars |
| Jesus Freak Hideout | 3/5 stars 4/5 stars |
| Louder Than The Music | 4.5/5 stars |
| Worship Leader | 5/5 stars |

AllMusic's Robert Ham wrote that "the typical bent of contemporary Christian bands is to stick to a well-worn template of artless, arena-styled rock that has been buffed to a blinding sheen. So, kudos to the Rhett Walker Band for doing what they can to break that trend. There's still plenty of volume and bombast to the songs on the band's debut release Come to the River, but it's tempered with a whole lot of twang and attitude. Unfortunately for the quartet, that renders their sound to something akin to a Christian Nickelback. That might actually be considered a compliment in some circles, but for CCM listeners hoping for something a little different, it's quite a letdown." But, Ham left off on a positive note in saying "the Nashville-native is capable of rafter-rattling howls and quiet whispers, each of with are affecting in their own right. And when matched up with his spiritually searching lyrics, his voice can cut straight through the thick layers of pounding rock music surrounding it."

Alpha Omega New's Ken Wiegman graded the album a B, and said that "'Southern-infused rock,' that’s what the Rhett Walker Band is branded as and I love it! Right away when I first plunked the CD into the car radio I heard similarities of bands like DecembeRadio and Third Day that have this same southern rock sound and straightforward Gospel message."

CCM Magazine's Matt Conner wrote that the album "speaks so loudly: there's not a better young band within the Christian music market than the Rhett Walker Band. Mix the charisma and strong melodic sensibilities of MercyMe with the rock swagger of Third Day and the grit of Needtobreathe and DecembeRadio and you have your next favorite act."

Christian Manifesto's Calvin E'Jon Moore said that "you won’t be disappointed."

Christian Music Zine's Joshua Andre wrote that the album "showcases some of the most vulnerable writing I have heard in a long time!" In addition, Andre said the band has "released a debut beyond my expectations! This unique band has given some well needed spark and energy into a CCM industry that needs to reinvent itself in the 21st century! With similar musical and lyrical themes to Third Day, needtobreathe and MercyMe’s recent album The Hurt & The Healer; this album has turned my musical preferences on their head! This is one of the most memorable and enjoyable CCM debuts since Moriah Peters."

Christianity Today's Andy Argyrakis wrote that "there's a vertical element to some of these songs, but the guitar slinger mostly sings about grace and rising above demons. Some of the tunes smolder with foot-stomping gusto, but Walker seems to be holding back a bit for the radio. Still, there's plenty of fine southern-fried rock here."

Cross Rhythms' Matthew Griggs said that "this debut release from the Tennessee-based rockers will, of course, be compared to a Third Day record, partially because of the similarities of Rhett Walker's voice to that of Mac Powell and the band's undeniable Southern rock approach. There is no doubting, however, this record stands alone brilliantly without the said comparisons." Furthermore, Griggs wrote that "'Come To The River' is a really upbeat, positive album that speaks of God's power and hope in our lives. Rhett Walker's voice shines throughout, and fits more than perfectly against a backdrop of raw guitar tone and immense instrumentation. An impressive, well produced debut, of quality songs."

Indie Vision Music's Jonathan Andre said "as I leave the album with this reminder, I am able to sit back and be thankful that I didn’t listen to my initial thought about how this album would be, because what I listened to was so much better. Though country isn’t really my favourite genre of music, the Rhett Walker Band have utilised the style to create a message of salvation, giving a unique new style of worship and praise, not recently brought to the CCM market (except for Third Day and needtobreathe!) Well done Rhett Walker Band for such an enjoyable and thought provoking album!"

Jesus Freak Hideout's Roger Gelwicks wrote that the album "is an entirely listenable effort by a competent band, but one can look to established southern rock outfits previously mentioned for a better quality listen."

Jesus Freak Hideout's Alex "Tincan" Caldwell said that "Rhett Walker Band's debut album traffics in the kind of sincere, honest southern rock and roll that you know is made by four guys playing together in a room somewhere." Calwell goes onto say with "this sort of honest songwriting, combined with an excellent performance and a pinch of grit in the mix makes for an excellent debut album. There is certainly room for improvement in subject matter and lyrics (a few songs lean on clichés for answers), but overall Rhett Walker Band has a bright future. It's a good time for the southern brand of rock and roll in Christian Music. With Third Day and Needtobreathe releasing excellent albums recently and the center of the CCM world being in Nashville, it just makes sense that there would be a wave of southern music like Come To The River."

Louder Than The Music's Jono Davies noted how "you can tell that Rhett will create music his way and say what he wants to say. This can be refreshing to hear but also makes listening to the songs an unsettling experience. Yet isn't being uncomfortable sometimes an inspiring thing? This album has turned me into a fan of Rhett Walker's work. Maybe for me the album jumps in styles a little too much, but the songs make up for it in so many ways."

Worship Leader's Jay Akins said "this album feels and sounds like an honest southern rock record with straightforward lyrics and strong musicianship." This lends itself to being "best suited for special music or personal listening."
