= Behold (song) =

2022 song by Phil Wickham

Single by Phil Wickham featuring Anne Wilson
- Released: August 26, 2022
- Genre: Contemporary worship music; Christmas music
- Length: 4:24
- Label: Fair Trade Services
- Songwriter(s): Dallas Jenkins; Phil Wickham; Steven Furtick
- Producer(s): Jonathan Smith

Phil Wickham singles chronology
"Worthy of My Song (Worthy of It All)" (2022)	"Behold" (2022)	"Then Christ Came" (2022)

Anne Wilson singles chronology
"Me on Your Mind" (2022)	"Behold" (2022)	"Hey Girl" (2022)

Music videos
- "Behold" on YouTube
- "Behold" (Live) on YouTube
- "Behold" (Lyrics) on YouTube

"Behold" is a song by Phil Wickham featuring Anne Wilson. The song was released on August 26, 2022, as a standalone single. Wickham co-wrote the song with Dallas Jenkins and Steven Furtick. Jonathan Smith produced the single.

"Behold" peaked at number eight on the US Hot Christian Songs chart.

== Background ==
On August 26, 2022, Phil Wickham released "Behold" featuring Anne Wilson as a single. Wickham also announced the Behold Christmas Nights Tour, presented by Transparent Productions, and joined by Anne Wilson and Brandon Lake as special guests. The tour began at the Capital Christian Center in Sacramento on December 8, 2022, and concluded at the Maranatha Chapel in San Diego on December 11, 2022.

== Writing and development ==
Wickham shared that the song had been written during the Christmas season of 2021 and he wanted to sing with someone else. Wickham decided on working with Anne Wilson after hearing her single, "My Jesus," on the radio.

== Composition ==
"Behold" is composed in the key of B with a tempo of 73.5 beats per minute and a musical time signature of 6/8.

== Critical reception ==
Jonathan Andre, reviewing for 365 Days of Inspiring Media review, gave a positive remarks about the song, saying ""Behold" is a great song full of Biblical truth and lyrical richness," and further added that it "continues to remind us of how much of a powerful singer-songwriter Phil himself is, as he continues to assert himself to become a great worship artist alternative."

== Commercial performance ==
"Behold" made its debut at number 27 on the US Christian Airplay chart dated December 3, 2022. The song peaked at number two on the Christian Airplay chart.

"Behold" debuted at number 17 on the US Hot Christian Songs chart dated December 3, 2022, concurrently charting at number 15 on the Christian Digital Song Sales chart. The song peaked at number eight on the Hot Christian Songs chart.

== Music videos ==
Phil Wickham availed the audio video of "Behold" through YouTube on August 26, 2022. On November 4, 2022, Phil Wickham released the official lyric video of the song on YouTube. Phil Wickham published the official music video for "Behold" featuring Anne Wilson on November 14, 2022, via YouTube. On December 17, 2022, Phil Wickham released the live performance video of the song featuring Anne Wilson on YouTube.

== Charts ==
Chart performance for "Behold"
Chart (2022)	Peak position
US Christian Songs (Billboard)	8
US Christian Airplay (Billboard)	2
US Christian AC (Billboard)	1

== Release history ==
Release history and formats for "Behold"
Region	Date	Format	Label	Ref.
Various	August 26, 2022	Digital download; streaming	Fair Trade Services	
United States	November 25, 2022	Christian radio	Fair Trade Services	
