= Rebel (Anne Wilson album) =

2024 studio album by Anne Wilson

Studio album by Anne Wilson
- Released: April 19, 2024
- Genre: Christian country
- Length: 53:45
- Label: Sparrow; Capitol CMG
- Producer: Zach Kale; Jeff Pardo; Jonathan Smith

Anne Wilson chronology
My Jesus (2022)	Rebel (2024)	Stars (2025)

Singles from Rebel
- 1. "Rain in the Rearview" Released: October 9, 2023; 2. "Strong" Released: 2023; 3. "Songs About Whiskey" Released: July 15, 2024

Rebel is the second studio album by American contemporary Christian and country music singer Anne Wilson. It was released via Sparrow and Capitol Christian Music Group on April 19, 2024.

== Background ==
Following the release of My Jesus in 2022, Wilson received messages indicating that fans of country music were resonating with her sound as well as the CCM market that she catered the record and its singles to. On Rebel, Wilson set out to intertwine the two musical genres, saying that "the songs that were coming from my heart were leaning more country" when she began writing for the record. The album's title track was born out of Wilson's frustration with being told one of her previous single releases to CCM radio was "too country" for the format to play, which encouraged the development of the Rebel album as a confident blend of both genres.

Wilson co-wrote the majority of the album's 16 tracks with Jeff Pardo and Matthew West, with additional writing credits from country songwriters including Nicolle Galyon, Emily Weisband, Trannie Anderson and Casey Beathard. It features collaborations with country music artists Lainey Wilson ("Praying Woman") and Jordan Davis ("Country Gold"), as well as CCM artist Chris Tomlin ("The Cross").

"Rain in the Rearview" was released as Wilson's first single to country radio on October 9, 2023, while "Strong" was released as a single to CCM radio. "Rain in the Rearview" was inspired by the death of Wilson's older brother in 2017, an event she credits with shifting her dream to becoming a recording artist. The music video was directed by TK McKamy and premiered on January 26, 2024, and features her sister Elizabeth as her body double.

"Songs About Whiskey" was originally slated to be released as the third single from the album on June 3, 2024, but the adds date was pushed back to July 15.

== Commercial performance ==
In the United States, Rebel debuted at number one on the Top Christian Albums chart and at number 10 on the Top Country Albums chart.

== Track listing ==
Rebel track listing
No.	Title	Writer(s)	Length
1.	"Rebel"	Anne Wilson; Jeff Pardo; Matthew West	3:14
2.	"Rain in the Rearview"	A. Wilson; Jaren Johnston; Zach Kale; West	3:01
3.	"Strong"	A. Wilson; Pardo; West	3:24
4.	"God & Country"	A. Wilson; Trannie Anderson; Pardo; West	3:19
5.	"Praying Woman" (with Lainey Wilson)	A. Wilson; Anderson; Pardo; West; Lainey Wilson	3:51
6.	"Songs About Whiskey"	A. Wilson; Lauren Hungate; Pardo; West	2:53
7.	"Sinner's Prayer"	A. Wilson; Hungate; Pardo; West	3:16
8.	"The Cross" (with Chris Tomlin)	A. Wilson; Pardo; Jonathan Smith; West	3:41
9.	"My Father's Daughter"	A. Wilson; Pardo; Emily Weisband; West	3:02
10.	"Red Flag"	A. Wilson; Casey Beathard; Smith	3:12
11.	"Country Gold" (with Jordan Davis)	A. Wilson; Pardo; West	3:16
12.	"Southern Gospel"	A. Wilson; Hungate; Pardo; West	2:46
13.	"Dirt Roads in Heaven"	A. Wilson; Nicolle Galyon; Pardo; West	3:22
14.	"3:16"	A. Wilson; Pardo; West	3:06
15.	"Milestones"	A. Wilson; Galyon; Hungate	3:27
16.	"Out of the Bluegrass"	A. Wilson; Galyon; Weisband	4:47
Total length:			53:45

== Personnel ==
Musicians and vocalists

- Anne Wilson – vocals, backing vocals (1–3, 5–7, 10, 14–16)
- Jeff Pardo – acoustic piano (1–4, 6–9, 11, 12, 14), Hammond organ (1–3, 9, 12, 14), acoustic guitars (1, 6, 12), backing vocals (1, 2, 5, 6, 10, 12, 14), programming (2, 7, 11, 12, 14), keyboards (3, 7, 8, 11, 14), additional keyboards (5)
- Jonathan Smith – programming (1, 2, 5, 7, 8), additional guitars (1), bouzouki (2, 10), high-strung guitars (2), electric guitars (3, 8), keyboards (8), acoustic guitars (8, 10), Wurlitzer electric piano (10), Rhodes bass (10), backing vocals (10), additional programming (11)
- Zach Kale – programming (2), additional guitars (2), synth bass (2)
- Billy Justineau – acoustic piano (5), Hammond organ (5, 10),clavinet (10), keyboards (10, 15, 16)
- Colton Price – programming (5)
- Chris Bevins – Hammond organ (6)
- Courtlan Clement – electric guitars (1–4, 6–8, 11–14), acoustic guitars (1–4, 8, 11, 13, 14), mandolin (1–3, 7, 13, 14), bouzouki (1, 3, 4, 12, 14), dobro (2, 3), banjo (2, 4, 6, 7, 12), acoustic 12-string guitar (8), slide guitar (11, 12), steel guitar (13)
- Kris Donegan – electric guitars (4, 6, 10)
- Sam Hunter – electric guitars (5, 7, 15, 16), rubber bridge guitar (15, 16)
- Todd Lombardo – electric guitars (5), high-strung guitar (5, 15, 16), acoustic guitars (7, 15, 16)
- Tyler Johnson – electric guitars (8)
- Scotty Murray – steel guitar (6)
- Josh Matheny – dobro (7)
- Tony Lucido – bass (1–4, 6, 8, 11–14)
- Jimmie Lee Sloas – bass (5, 7, 15, 16)
- Jacob Arnold – drums (1, 3–8, 11, 12, 14–16), percussion (1, 3–8, 11, 12, 14–16)
- Aaron Sterling – drums (10, 13), percussion (10, 13)
- Carole Rabinowitz – cello (9)
- David Angell – viola (9)
- David Davidson – violin (9)
- Kristin Wilkinson – violin (9)
- Tim Lauer – string arrangements (9)
- Jenee Fleenor – fiddle (12)
- Matthew West – backing vocals (1, 5, 6, 12, 14)
- Josh Reedy – backing vocals (3)
- Kristen Rogers – backing vocals (4)
- Jason Eskridge – backing vocals (5, 7, 8, 14)
- Kiley Phillips – backing vocals (5, 7, 8, 14)
- Nickie Conley – backing vocals (5, 8, 14)
- Will Merrill – backing vocals (5, 8, 14)
- Lainey Wilson – vocals (5)
- Devonne Fowlkes – backing vocals (7)
- Moiba Mustapha – backing vocals (7)
- Chris Tomlin – vocals (8)
- Jamie McDonald – backing vocals (8)
- Jordan Davis – vocals (11)
- Mark Lonsway – backing vocals (11, 15, 16)
- Lauren Hungate – backing vocals (12)

Production

- Josh Bailey – A&R
- Chelsea Blythe – A&R
- Hannah Wilson – A&R
- Jeff Pardo – producer
- Jonathan Smith – producer
- Zach Kale – producer (2)
- Bobby Sirko – A&R administrator
- Nathan Blaine – art direction, packaging
- Trent Nicholson – art direction, packaging
- Aaron Stearns – art direction, packaging, creative director
- Robby Klein – photography
- Story House Collective – management

Technical credits

- Joe LaPorta – mastering at Sterling Sound (Edgewater, New Jersey)
- Sean Moffitt – mixing at Yoda's Palace Studios (Nashville, Tennessee)
- Jesse Brock – mix assistant
- Buckley Miller – engineer
- Jeff Pardo – engineer
- Jacob Arnold – additional engineer
- Courtlan Clement – additional engineer
- Jason Eskridge – additional engineer
- Kris Donegan – additional engineer
- Scotty Murray – additional engineer
- Aaron Sterling – additional engineer
- Chris Bevins – editing
- Colton Price – editing

== Charts ==
=== Weekly ===
Weekly chart performance for Rebel
Chart (2024)	Peak position
US Billboard 200	59
US Top Christian Albums (Billboard)	1
US Top Country Albums (Billboard)	10

=== Year-end ===
Year-end chart performance for Rebel
Chart (2025)	Position
US Top Christian Albums (Billboard)	24
