= I Still Believe in Christmas =

2021 single by Anne Wilson

Single by Anne Wilson
- Released: October 29, 2021
- Genre: CCM; Christmas music
- Length: 3:48
- Label: Sparrow; Capitol CMG
- Songwriters: Anne Wilson; Jeff Pardo; Matthew West
- Producers: Jonathan Smith; Jeff Pardo

Anne Wilson singles chronology
"My Jesus" (2021)	"I Still Believe in Christmas" (2021)	"Emmanuel God With Us" (2022)

Music video
- "I Still Believe in Christmas" (Lyrics) on YouTube

"I Still Believe in Christmas" is a song by American contemporary Christian music singer Anne Wilson, released on October 29, 2021. Wilson co-wrote the song with Jeff Pardo and Matthew West.

"I Still Believe in Christmas" peaked at number fifteen on the US Hot Christian Songs chart.

== Background ==
On October 29, 2021, Anne Wilson released the multi-track single "I Still Believe in Christmas" accompanied with a lyric video of the song. She shared the story behind "I Still Believe in Christmas", calling it "a song of the hope we have in Our precious Lord and Savior, Jesus. It can be hard to cling to hope in the middle of the world we are in right now, but we have to choose to still believe in the miracle of Christmas. I pray this song leads you closer to Jesus and fills you with His love and comfort during this holiday season."

== Composition ==
"I Still Believe in Christmas" is composed in the key of F♯ with a tempo of 76 beats per minute and a musical time signature of 4/4.

== Commercial performance ==
"I Still Believe in Christmas" made its debut at number 40 on the US Christian Airplay chart dated December 4, 2021. The song reached number one on the Christian Airplay chart dated January 1, 2022, becoming Wilson's second number one on the chart, after "My Jesus".

== Track listing ==
All tracks were produced by Jonathan Smith and Jeff Pardo.

"I Still Believe in Christmas"
No.	Title	Writer(s)	Length
1.	"I Still Believe in Christmas"	Anne Wilson; Jeff Pardo; Matthew West	3:48
2.	"Kentucky Fried Christmas"	Wilson; Jonathan Smith; Mia Fieldes; Zach Williams	3:04
3.	"Just Because It's Christmas"	Wilson; Pardo	3:46
Total length:			10:28

== Personnel ==
Adapted from AllMusic.

- Jacob Arnold — drums, percussion
- Joe Baldridge — engineer
- Chris Bevins — editing
- Court Clement — acoustic guitar, banjo, Dobro, mandolin, Pedal Steel
- Courtlan Clement — electric guitar
- Nickie Conley — background vocals
- Jason Eskridge — background vocals
- Andy Leftwich — fiddle, mandolin
- Tony Lucido — bass
- Pete Lyman — mastering engineer
- Jamie MacDonald — background vocals
- Matt Menefee — banjo
- Scott Mulvahill — double bass
- Scotty Murray — lap steel guitar
- Jeff Pardo — background vocals, mixing, piano, producer, programmer, synthesizer programming, Wurlitzer
- Kiely Phillips — background vocals
- Louis Remenappat — assistant engineer
- Jonathan Smith — acoustic guitar, background vocals, Mellotron, producer, programmer
- Doug Weier — mixing
- Anne Wilson — primary artist, background vocals, vocals

== Charts ==
Chart performance for "I Still Believe in Christmas"
Chart (2021)	Peak position
US Christian Songs (Billboard)	15
US Christian Airplay (Billboard)	1
US Christian AC (Billboard)	1

== Release history ==
Release dates and formats for "I Still Believe in Christmas"
Region	Date	Format	Label	Ref.
Various	October 29, 2021	Digital download; streaming	Sparrow; Capitol CMG	
United States	November 3, 2021	Christian radio	Sparrow; Capitol CMG	
