= When Mercy Found Me =

Single by Rhett Walker Band

from the album Come to the River
- Released: April 23, 2012
- Genre: Christian Alternative-Southern Rock
- Length: 3:58
- Label: Essential
- Songwriter(s): Jeff Pardo; Rhett Walker

"When Mercy Found Me" is a song by Christian Alternative-Southern Rock group Rhett Walker Band from their debut studio album, Come to the River via Essential Records. It was released on April 23, 2012. It was the first single from the album and band.

== Background ==
This song was written by Jeff Pardo and Rhett Walker. According to Walker, it is his personal testimony of faith.

"When Mercy Found Me" was digitally released as the lead debut single from Come to the River on April 23, 2012 via Essential Records.

The band released an official lyric video of the song on YouTube.

== Reception ==
Worship Leader claimed the song "declares the love and grace of a merciful Savior".

== Charts ==
=== Weekly charts ===
Chart (2012)	Peak position
US Christian AC (Billboard)	15
US Christian Airplay (Billboard)	15
US Christian Songs (Billboard)	15
US Christian AC Indicator (Billboard)	5

=== Year-end charts ===
Chart (2012)	Peak position
US Christian Songs (Billboard)	33
