= Rhett Walker Band =

US Christian rock band

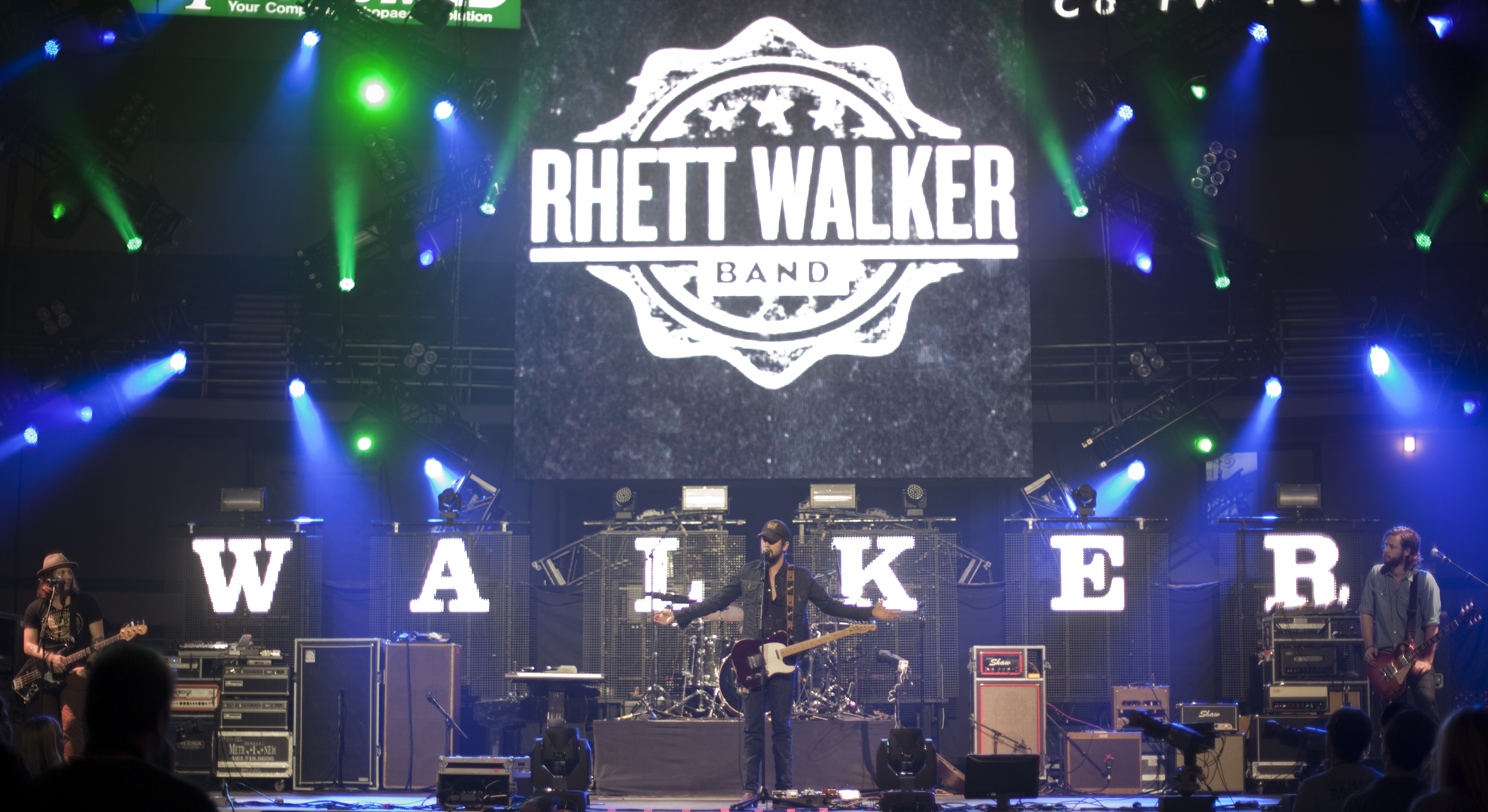
- Rhett Walker live at Rock & Worship Roadshow 2013

Background information
- Origin: Nashville, Tennessee, U.S.
- Genres: Christian rock, Southern rock
- Years active: 2011–present
- Label: Essential
- Members: Rhett Walker
- Website: rhettwalker.com

Rhett Walker Band is a Southern rock and Christian rock band from Nashville. The band released their debut studio album under the Essential Records label on July 10, 2012, called Come to the River. The band's debut single, "When Mercy Found Me", achieved placement on Christian music charts.

Rhett Walker Band announced they were discontinuing in 2016. In 2017, Walker re-signed with Essential Records.

== Background ==
Rhett Walker Band frontman Rhett Walker is a preacher's kid from Aiken, South Carolina. The band formed in 2011 and consisted of Rhett Walker as well as Kenny Davis who played drums, the guitarist Joe Kane, and bassist Kevin Whitsett.

The band released their debut single "When Mercy Found Me" on April 23, 2012, and reached No.5 on the Christian AC Indicator & AC Monitored chart September 2012. This song was written by Rhett Walker and Jeff Pardo. "When Mercy Found Me" was nominated for a Grammy on Wednesday, December 5, 2012, for Best Contemporary Christian Music Song.

The band's debut album Come to the River released on July 10, 2012, by Essential Records. Walker said they wrote 50 songs while coming up with songs for the record.

The band's second album, Here's to the Ones, was released on October 14, 2014, through Essential Records.

== Discography ==
=== Albums ===
| Year | Album | Peak chart positions | | |
| Year | Album | US | US Christ. | US Heat. |
|---|---|---|---|---|
| 2012 | Come to the River: Released: July 10, 2012; Label: Essential; Format: CD, Digital download | — (Note: Come to the River did not chart on the Billboard 200, but peaked at No. 166 on the Top Current Albums chart.) | 9 | 154 |
| 2014 | Here's to the Ones: Released: October 14, 2014; Label: Essential; Format: CD, Digital download | 183 | 12 | — |
| 2020 | Good To Me: Rhett Walker solo album; Released: March 27, 2020; Label: Essential/Provident; Formats: CD, digital download | — | 49 | — |
| 2024 | Days That We Dreamed Of: Rhett Walker solo album; Released: August 9, 2024; Label: BEC Recordings; Formats: CD, digital download | — | — | — |

=== EPs ===
| Year | EP | Peak chart positions |
| Year | EP | US Christ. |
|---|---|---|
| 2012 | The Other Sides: Released: December 14, 2012; Label: Essential | — |
| 2018 | Rhett Walker Band: Released: August 10, 2018; Label: Essential | 43 |
| 2021 | Gospel Song: Released: August 27, 2021; Label: Essential | — |
| 2025 | Christmas Mixtape: Released: November 28, 2025; Label: BEC Recordings | — |

=== Singles ===
| Year | Title | Chart peak positions | | | Album |
| Year | Title | US Christ. | US Christ. Airplay | US Christ. AC | Album |
|---|---|---|---|---|---|
| 2012 | "When Mercy Found Me" | 15 | | 15 | Come to the River |
| 2012 | "O Come O Come Emmanuel" | 46 | | — | non-album single |
| 2013 | "Come to the River" | 20 | | 23 | Come to the River |
| 2014 | "Broken Man" | — | 46 | — | Here's to the Ones |
| 2015 | "Love Like Jesus" | — | 47 | — | Here's to the Ones |
| 2017 | "I Surrender" | — | 50 | — | non-album single |
| 2018 | "Say Hello" | — | 45 | — | Rhett Walker Band (EP) |
| 2019 | "Believer" | 7 | 7 | 7 | Good To Me |
| 2019 | "Have Yourself a Merry Little Christmas" | — | — | — | non-album single |
| 2021 | "Goodness of God" | — | 42 | — | non-album single |
| 2021 | "Gospel Song" | 2 | 2 | 2 | Gospel Song (EP) |
| 2022 | "All Joy No Stress" | — | 23 | — | Gospel Song (EP) |
| 2022 | "Family Is Family" | — | — | — | non-album single |
| 2023 | "Man on the Middle Cross" | — | — | — | Days That We Dreamed Of |
| 2023 | "It's Beginning to Look a Lot Like Christmas" | — | — | — | Days That We Dreamed Of |
| 2024 | "Somebody Say Amen" | — | — | — | Days That We Dreamed Of |
| 2024 | "Days That We Dreamed Of" | — | — | — | Days That We Dreamed Of |
| 2025 | "Look At God" | — | — | — | non-album single |
| 2025 | "Carol of the Bells" | — | — | — | Christmas Mixtape (EP) |

== Awards ==
GMA Dove Awards

| Year | Award | Nominee | Result |
|---|---|---|---|
| 2013 | Rock/Contemporary Album of the Year | Come to the River | Nominated |
| 2013 | Rock/Contemporary Song of the Year | "When Mercy Found Me" | Nominated |
| 2013 | New Artist of the Year | Rhett Walker Band | Nominated |

Grammys

| Year | Award | Nominee | Result |
|---|---|---|---|
| 2013 | CCM Song of the Year | "When Mercy Found Me" | Nominated |
