= Mamas (song) =

2022 song by Anne Wilson and Hillary Scott

Song by Anne Wilson and Hillary Scott

from the album My Jesus
- Released: April 22, 2022
- Genre: CCM; Christian country
- Length: 3:24
- Label: Sparrow; Capitol CMG
- Songwriters: Anne Wilson; Jeff Pardo; Matthew West
- Producers: Ben Glover; Jeff Sojka

Music video
- "Mamas" on YouTube

"Mamas" is a song by American contemporary Christian music singer Anne Wilson and American country music singer Hillary Scott. It was released as the ninth track on Wilson's debut studio album, My Jesus, on April 22, 2022. Wilson co-wrote the song with Jeff Pardo and Matthew West.

"Mamas" peaked at number 15 on the US Hot Christian Songs chart. "Mamas" received a GMA Dove Award nomination for Bluegrass/Country/Roots Recorded Song of the Year at the 2022 GMA Dove Awards.

== Reception ==
=== Critical response ===
Jonathan Andre of 365 Days of Inspiring Media opined that "Mamas" had the potential to be a "great hit on country radio." CMT described the song as a "faith-centric melody," "tear-jerking track," and a "moving duet." Jesus Freak Hideout's Josh Balogh said Wilson's duet with Hillary Scott was "well done." JubileeCast's Timothy Yap said the song was "well-crafted," calling it "A future Mother's Day favorite, anyone who has had ever had a mother will smile at the many heartfelt lines." Christopher Wegner, reviewing for CNTRY, also described the song as a future Mother's Day classic.

=== Accolades ===
Awards
Year	Organization	Award	Result	Ref
2022	GMA Dove Awards	Bluegrass/Country/Roots Recorded Song of the Year	Pending	

== Composition ==
"Mamas" is a shuffle-step song, composed in the key of G with a tempo of 80 beats per minute and a musical time signature of 4/4.

== Commercial performance ==
"Mamas" debuted at number 31 on the US Hot Christian Songs chart dated May 7, 2022. The song went on to peak at number 15 on the Hot Christian Songs chart dated May 21, 2022.

== Music videos ==
On April 22, 2022, Anne Wilson released the official audio video for the song. On May 4, 2022, Anne Wilson released the official music video for "Mamas". The music video was released as a Mother's Day tribute, and features Wilson's mother as well as Scott's three daughters.

The video begins with Wilson singing to her mother while playing her guitar, followed by an appearance of Hillary Scott at a park playing with her daughters, Eisele Kaye, and twins Betsy Mack and Emory JoAnn. Other scenes in the music video depict mother-daughter relationships in daily life, from a woman holding a baby, a mother teaching her daughter driving, and a father and son visiting a grave.

== Charts ==
Chart performance for "Mamas"
Chart (2022)	Peak position
US Christian Songs (Billboard)	15
