= 53rd GMA Dove Awards =

2022 US music awards ceremony

- Date: October 18, 2022
- Location: Allen Arena, Nashville, Tennessee
- Country: United States
- Hosted by: Erica Campbell and Chris Tomlin

Highlights
- Most awards: For King & Country, Jeff Pardo and Phil Wickham (3 each)
- Most nominations: Jeff Pardo (9)
- Website: www.doveawards.com

Television/radio coverage
- Network: TBN (October 21, 2022 at 8 p.m. ET)
- Produced by: Curtis Stoneberger; Paul Wright
- Directed by: Russell E. Hall

The 53rd Annual GMA Dove Awards presentation ceremony was held on Tuesday, October 18, 2022, at the Allen Arena located in Nashville, Tennessee. The ceremony recognized the accomplishments of musicians and other figures within the Christian music industry for the year 2022. The ceremony aired on Trinity Broadcasting Network on Friday, October 21, 2022.

The nominees were announced on Wednesday, August 10, 2022. Songwrite and producer Jeff Pardo led with nine nominations among non-artists, while Matthew West and Maverick City Music led the artist nominations with seven each. For King & Country, Jeff Pardo, and Phil Wickham won the most awards, each winning three awards. For King & Country won Pop/Contemporary Album of the Year and Long Form Video of the Year for What Are We Waiting For? (2022), and Short Form Video of the Year (Concept) for "Relate". Phil Wickham won Songwriter of the Year - Artist, Worship Album of the Year for Hymn of Heaven (2021) and Worship Recorded Song of the Year for "Hymn of Heaven". CeCe Winans won Artist of the Year, achieving history as the first black female artist to win the award, and also won Song of the Year for "Believe for It". Anne Wilson won New Artist of the Year and Pop/Contemporary Song of the Year for "My Jesus".

== Nominations announcement ==
In July 2022, the Gospel Music Association announced that the 53rd GMA Dove Awards will be held on Tuesday, October 18, 2022, at the Allen Arena in Nashville, Tennessee, while nominations will be revealed on August 10, 2022. The nominees were announced on Wednesday, August 10, 2022, during a livestream event by Jimmie Allen, Erica Campbell, Evan Craft, Sonya Isaacs, Brandon Lake, Trip Lee, Chris Tomlin, and Tye Tribbett. There were a total of 2,087 entries submitted for nominations.

== Performers ==
The following musical artists performed at the 53rd GMA Dove Awards:

- Anne Wilson
- Blessing Offor
- Brooke Ligertwood
- Chris Tomlin
- Crowder
- Doe
- Erica Campbell
- Gateway Worship Español
- HighRoad
- Jaelee Robert
- Jekalyn Carr
- Karen Peck
- Kenna West
- Kim Hopper
- Maverick City Music
- Phil Wickham
- Social Club Misfits
- Steven Curtis Chapman
- Steven Malcolm
- Tasha Cobbs Leonard
- The Nelons
- TobyMac
- Todd Galberth

== Presenters ==
The following people were presenters at the 53rd GMA Dove Awards:

- Anna Golden
- Bart Millard
- Ben Roethlisberger
- CeCe Winans
- Chris Brown
- David & Tamela Mann
- Evan Craft
- Hezekiah Walker
- Jenn Johnson
- Jonathan McReynolds
- Jonathan Roumie
- Marcos Witt
- Matt Maher
- Michael W. Smith
- Ricky Dillard
- Tasha Cobbs Leonard
- Tasha Layton
- Tauren Wells
- Taya

== Nominees ==
This is a complete list of the nominees for the 53rd GMA Dove Awards. Winners are highlighted in bold.

=== General ===
Song of the Year

- "Be Alright"
  - (writers) Sean Cook, Evan Craft, Willy Gonzalez, (publisher) Capitol CMG Publishing
- **"Believe for It"**
  - **(writers) Dwan Hill, Kyle Lee, CeCe Winans, Mitch Wong, (publishers) Essential Music Publishing LLC, Fun Attic Music LLC, Integrity Music, Pure Psalms Music Inc.**
- "Come What May"
  - (writers) Darren Mulligan, Jeff Pardo, (publishers) Capitol CMG Publishing, Curb Music Publishing
- "Good God Almighty"
  - (writers) David Crowder, Ben Glover, Jeff Sojka, (publisher) Capitol CMG Publishing
- "Hold On to Me"
  - (writers) Lauren Daigle, Paul Duncan, Paul Mabury, (publishers) Centricity Publishing, Essential Music Publishing LLC
- "House of the Lord"
  - (Writers) Jonathan Smith, Phil Wickham, (Publisher) Essential Music Publishing LLC
- "Jireh"
  - (writers) Chris Brown, Steven Furtick, Chandler Moore, Naomi Raine, (publishers) Bethel Music Publishing, Essential Music Publishing LLC
- "Look What You've Done"
  - (writers) Tasha Layton, AJ Pruis, Keith Everette Smith, Matthew West, (publisher) Music Services Inc.
- "My Jesus"
  - (writers) Jeff Pardo, Matthew West, Anne Wilson, (publisher) Capitol CMG Publishing
- "Promises"
  - (writers) Keila Alvarado, Joe L. Barnes, Dante Bowe, Phillip Carrington Gaines, Lemuel Marin, Aaron Moses, (publishers) Bethel Music Publishing, Capitol CMG Publishing, Essential Music Publishing LLC, Watershed Music Group
- "Rattle!"
  - (writers) Chris Brown, Steven Furtick, Brandon Lake, (publishers) Bethel Music Publishing, Essential Music Publishing LLC

Songwriter of the Year - Artist

- Anne Wilson
- Brandon Lake
- Chris Brown
- Dante Bowe
- Matthew West
- **Phil Wickham**

Songwriter of the Year - Non Artist

- Andrew Jacob Pruis
- Benjamin Glover
- **Jason Ingram**
- Joshua Kerr
- Paul Duncan

Artist of the Year

- **CeCe Winans**
  - **(record label) Puresprings Gospel**
- For King & Country
  - (record label) Curb | Word Entertainment
- Maverick City Music
  - (record label) Tribl Records
- We The Kingdom
  - (record label) Capitol CMG
- Zach Williams
  - (record label) Provident Label Group

New Artist of the Year

- **Anne Wilson**
  - **(record label) Sparrow Records**
- Blessing Offor
  - (record label) Bowyer & Bow
- Doe
  - (record label) RCA Inspiration
- Jordan St. Cyr
  - (record label) BEC Recordings
- Ryan Ellis
  - (record label) Provident Label Group

Producer of the Year

- Dana Sorey
- **Jeff Pardo**
- Jonathan Smith
- Wayne Haun
- Team: Tony Brown & Jonathan Jay

=== Rap/Hip Hop ===
Rap/Hip Hop Recorded Song of the Year

- "Above Me" – Aaron Cole, featuring Parris Chariz
  - (writers) Aaron Cole, Joshua Ryan Davis "Young Sentro", Parris Hoskins, Francis Lopez Varela "Santo"
- "Ain't Playin'" – Steven Malcolm, Social Club Misfits
  - (writers) Isaac De Boni, Jahmal Gwin, Demi Kolenbrander, Steven Malcolm, Marty Mar, Fernando Miranda, Michael Mulè
- **"King Jesus" – KB, nobigdyl.**
  - **(writers) Kevin Elijah Burgess, Quinten Coblentz, Dylan Alexander Phillips, Wesley Smith**
- "Wildin" – Lecrae, 1K Phew
  - (writers) Benjamin Abrahami, Glenn Isaac Gordon, Uzoma Harbor, Keith Martin, Jacob Mende-Fridkis, Lecrae Moore
- "Without You" – Social Club Misfits, featuring Riley Clemmons
  - (writers) Chris Mackey, Fernando Miranda, Martin Santiago, Colby Wedgeworth

Rap/Hip Hop Album of the Year

- **No Church In A While – Lecrae, 1K Phew**
  - **(producers) 1995, BUNKERBOY, Carvello, CJ Francis, Foreverolling, Herothaproducer, Hugo Black, King Court, Onetakejake, Phenom_J, Sucuki, Uzoharbor, WEARETHEGOOD, WHATUPRG, Wizzle, Wolf**
- The End. – Trip Lee
  - (producers) 1995, Enzo Gran, Juice Bangers, Mashell, Trip Lee
- Two Up Two Down – Aaron Cole
  - (producers) Seth Bedenbaugh, Carvello, Chino, Greg Cox, Anthony Cruz, Forgotten, Killawatts, Chris King, Santo, KJ Scriven, Stoic, Versus Beatz, Cole Walowac, Young Sentro
- Unstoppable (United We Can) – Angie Rose
  - (producers) Chris Liggio, Tommee Profitt, Jeff Sojka, Ido Zmishlany
- Upperhand – indie tribe
  - (producers) 1995, Enzo Gran, Harz, Iggy, Jon Keith, Mogli the Iceburg, nobigdyl., WAUI, wow eli

=== Rock/Contemporary ===
Rock/Contemporary Recorded Song of the Year

- "Altogether Good - Live" – Citizens
  - (writers) Zach Bolen, Brian Eichelberger
- **"Higher Power" – Crowder, featuring Hulvey**
  - **(writers) David Crowder, Ben Glover, Christopher Michael Hulvey, Rebecca Lauren Olds, Solomon Olds, Jeff Sojka**
- "I Love You" – Judah., featuring Dante Bowe, Aaron Moses
  - (writers) Judah Lee Akers, Aaron Moses
- "I Need You" – Gable Price and Friends
  - (writers) Kristene DiMarco, David Funk, Brandon Lake, David Leonard, Gable Price
- "Surviving the Game" – Skillet
  - (writers) Kane Churko, Kevin Churko, John Cooper, Korey Cooper

Rock/Contemporary Album of the Year

- Dominion – Skillet
  - (producers) Kane Churko, Kevin Churko, Seth Mosley, Michael "X" O'Connor
- Get Out of the Way of Your Own Heart (Deluxe Edition) – Chris Renzema
  - (producers) Hank Bentley, Chris Renzema
- Interrobang – Switchfoot
  - (producer) Tony Berg
- **Into the Mystery – Needtobreathe**
  - **(producers) Needtobreathe, Konrad Snyder**
- The Joy of Being Together (Live) – Citizens
  - (producers) Zach Bolen, Brian Eichelberger

=== Pop/Contemporary ===
Pop/Contemporary Recorded Song of the Year

- "House of the Lord" – Phil Wickham
  - (writers) Jonathan Smith, Phil Wickham
- "In Jesus Name (God of Possible)" – Katy Nichole
  - (writers) Ethan Hulse, Katy Nichole, Jeff Pardo, David Spencer
- **"My Jesus" – Anne Wilson**
  - **(writers) Jeff Pardo, Matthew West, Anne Wilson**
- "Relate" – For King & Country
  - (writers) Josh Kerr, Tayla Parx, Joel Smallbone, Luke Smallbone
- "Scars in Heaven" – Casting Crowns
  - (writers) John Mark Hall, Matthew West

Pop/Contemporary Album of the Year

- Healer – Casting Crowns
  - (producers) Mark Miller, Seth Mosley
- Milk & Honey – Crowder
  - (producers) Hank Bentley, Ben Glover, Solomon Olds, Zach Paradis, Tommee Profitt, Jeff Sojka
- My Jesus – Anne Wilson
  - (producers) Bryan Fowler, Ben Glover, Bernie Herms, Micah Kuiper, Jeff Pardo, Matt Podesla, Jonathan Smith, Jeff Sojka, Colby Wedgeworth, Avery Wright
- Rise Up – Cain
  - (producers) The Creak, Bryan Fowler, Jordan Mohilowski, Jeff Pardo, Nick Schwarz, Jonathan Smith
- **What Are We Waiting For? – For King & Country**
  - **(producers) Benjamin Backus, For King & Country, Josh Kerr, Seth Mosley, Jeff Sojka, Tedd T., Federico Vindver**

=== Inspirational ===
Inspirational Recorded Song of the Year

- "A Woman - Live" – Faithful, featuring Amy Grant, Ellie Holcomb
  - (writers) Ellie Holcomb, Jess Ray, Ann VosKamp
- **"God Is Good" – Francesca Battistelli**
  - **(writers) Francesca Battistelli, Ben Glover, Jeff Pardo**
- "I've Got Joy" – CeCe Winans
  - (writers) Kyle Lee, Phil Wickham
- "Lift Every Voice And Sing" – Tasha Cobbs Leonard
  - (writer) Traditional
- "You're Gonna Be OK" – Bethel Music, featuring Jenn Johnson
  - (writers) Jenn Johnson, Seth Mosley, Jeremy Riddle

Inspirational Album of the Year

- **Be Still & Know – Jordan Smith**
  - **(producer) Cason Cookley**
- Beloved – Lee Black
  - (producers) Lee Black, Rick Shelton
- David (Original Cast Recording) – Sight & Sound Theatres
  - (producer) Gabriel Wilson
- One Name – Selah
  - (producers) Chris Bevins, Jason Kyle
- Sing! In Christ Alone - Live at the Getty Music Worship Conference – Keith & Kristyn Getty
  - (producers) Keith & Kristyn Getty, Nathan Nockels

=== Southern Gospel ===
Southern Gospel Recorded Song of the Year

- "Answer Is Jesus" – Karen Peck & New River
  - (writers) Lee Black, Karen Peck Gooch, Kenna West
- "Child of the King" – Joseph Habedank
  - (writers) Dave Clark, Joseph Habedank, Don Koch
- **"My Feet Are on the Rock" – Gaither Vocal Band**
  - **(writers) Josh Bronleewe, Matthew Hein, Abbie Parker, Lindsey Sweat**
- "Not One Word" – The Collingsworth Family
  - (writers) John Mathis Jr., Brad Steele, Jeff Steele
- "Overcome" – Ernie Haase & Signature Sound
  - (writers) Jeff Bumgardner, Jason Davidson, Aaron Stewart

Southern Gospel Album of the Year

- 2:22 – Karen Peck & New River
  - (producers) Kris Crunk, Wayne Haun
- Just Sing! – The Collingsworth Family
  - (producer) Bradley Knight
- **Keeping On – Ernie Haase & Signature Sound**
  - **(producers) Kris Crunk, Brian Eads, Wayne Haun**
- More To The Story – The Kingsmen
  - (producer) Jeff Collins
- Something New – Legacy Five
  - (producers) Wayne Haun, Gordon Mote

=== Bluegrass/Country/Roots ===
Bluegrass/Country/Roots Recorded Song of the Year

- "All Is Well" – Carrie Underwood
  - (writers) Wayne Kirkpatrick, Michael W. Smith
- "God Is Real" – The Sound
  - (writers) Jacob Mills, Levi Mills, Robert Mills, Sue C. Smith, Barry Weeks
- "Grace And Goodness" – Sunday Drive
  - (writers) Randall Garland, Donna King, Kevin Winebarger
- **"In the Sweet By and By" – Dolly Parton, featuring Larry Cordle, Carl Jackson, Jerry Salley, Bradley Walker**
  - **(writer) Traditional**
- "Mamas" – Anne Wilson, featuring Hillary Scott
  - (writers) Jeff Pardo, Matthew West, Anne Wilson

Bluegrass/Country/Roots Album of the Year

- Breaking Boundaries – Sunday Drive
  - (producers) Chris Chavez, Wayne Haun
- Confessio - Irish American Roots – Keith & Kristyn Getty
  - (producers) Keith & Kristyn Getty, Ben Shive
- Country Faith Bluegrass – Various Artists
  - (producer) Jerry Salley
- **God Is Real – The Sound**
  - **(producer) Barry Weeks**
- One On One – Gary LeVox
  - (producers) Brown Bannister, Gary LeVox, Matthew McVaney, Jordan Mohilowski, Tedd T.

=== Contemporary Gospel ===
Contemporary Gospel Recorded Song of the Year

- "Adulting - Live" – Jonathan McReynolds, Mali Music
  - (writers) Jonathan McReynolds, Kortney Pollard, Terrell Dee Wilson
- "Believe For It" – CeCe Winans, featuring Lauren Daigle
  - (writers) Dwan Hill, Kyle Lee, CeCe Winans, Mitch Wong
- **"Gotta Believe" – Tasha Cobbs Leonard**
  - **(writer) Tasha Cobbs Leonard**
- "Sunday" – Koryn Hawthorne
  - (writers) Daniel Breland, Koryn Hawthorne, Conner J. Little, Kasey Rashel Sims, Anthony Wyley
- "When I Pray" – Doe
  - (writers) DeWitt Jones, Dominique Jones

Contemporary Gospel Album of the Year

- **Clarity – Doe**
  - **(producers) Chuck Butler, Bryan Fowler, Israel Houghton, Darryl "LiLMaN" Howell, Dewitt Jones, Doe Jones, Judah Jones, Matt Maher, Jonathan McReynolds, Jerry M Tate**
- Jonny x Mali: Live in LA (Stereo) – Jonathan McReynolds, Mali Music
  - (producers) Rogest "Roscoe" Carstarphen, Gregory Edwards, Darryl "LiLMaN" Howell, Jonathan McReynolds, Kortney Jamaal Pollard
- Jubilee: Juneteenth Edition – Maverick City Music
  - (producers) Harold Brown, Tony Brown, Jonathan Jay, Brandon Lake, Chandler Moore, Aaron Moses, Jeff Schneeweis
- Oil + Water – Travis Greene
  - (producers) Brunes Charles, Matthew Edwards, Travis Greene
- One Touch – Jabari Johnson
  - (producers) Simeon Baker, Jabari Johnson, Eric King Jr.

=== Traditional Gospel ===
Traditional Gospel Recorded Song of the Year

- "All I Need" – Jason Nelson
  - (writers) Jason Nelson, Dana T. Sorey
- "All of My Help - Live" – Ricky Dillard
  - (writers) Nathaniel Zaccheus Bean, Ricky Dillard
- "Help Me" – Tamela Mann, featuring The Fellas
  - (writers) Phillip Bryant, LaTia Mann, Tamela Mann, Bartholomew Orr, Justin Pearson
- **"My Portion" – Jekalyn Carr**
  - **(writer) Jekalyn Carr**
- "Your Presence Is a Gift" – E. Dewey Smith
  - (writers) Jules Bartholomew, Andrea Fisher, Darius Paulk, Natalie Sims, E. Dewey Smith, John Webb Jr., Elvis Lee Williams Jr

Traditional Gospel Album of the Year

- **Breakthrough: The Exodus (Live) – Ricky Dillard**
  - **(producers) Will Bogle, Ricky Dillard, Quadrius Salters, Michael Taylor**
- God Period – E. Dewey Smith
  - (producers) Terrence Isaiah, Brian King, Vindell Smith, John Webb Jr., Geremy Wimbush
- Keep Hymns Alive – Bishop Leonard Scott
  - (producer) Jeffrey Thomas II
- Quartagious (Deluxe Edition) – The Williams Singers
  - (producers) Jonathan Anderson Marcus Hodge, Blair Monique, Jermaine Morgan, Bart Orr, Doobie Powell, Kevin Powell, Ervin Bigman Williams, Darnell Williams, Dezmien Williams, Dezrale Williams
- Third Round – Kevin Lemons & Higher Calling
  - (producers) Erik Miller, Larry Wilson

=== Gospel Worship ===
Gospel Worship Recorded Song of the Year

- **"Breathe" – Maverick City Music, featuring Doe, Jonathan McReynolds, Chandler Moore**
  - **(writers) Pat Barrett, Doe Jones, Jonathan McReynolds, Chandler Moore**
- "Goodness of God - Live" – CeCe Winans
  - (writers) Ed Cash, Ben Fielding, Jason Ingram, Brian Johnson, Jenn Johnson
- "Jesus" – Phil Thompson
  - (writer) Phil Thompson
- "Lazarus" – Maranda Curtis
  - (writers) Maranda Curtis, Owen Nixon, Ernest Vaughan Jr.
- "Love Song" – Travis Greene, featuring Madison Binion
  - (writer) Travis Greene

Gospel Worship Album of the Year

- Anthems & Glory (Live) – Todd Dulaney
  - (producers) Todd Dulaney, Dontaniel Jamel Kimbrough
- Close – Jason Nelson
  - (producers) Jason Nelson, Dana T. Sorey, Jerome Baylor, Danni Baylor, Chris Howden
- Die to Live – Maranda Curtis
  - (producers) Phillip Bryant, Bart Orr II, Justin Savage
- Lion of Judah – Phil Thompson
  - (producers) Vancil Cooper, Joseph Santiago, Phil Thompson
- **Tribl Nights Atlanta – Tribl, Maverick City Music**
  - **(producers) Tony Brown, Jonathan Jay**

=== Spanish Language ===
Spanish Language Recorded Song of the Year

- "A Ciegas" – Indiomar, Musiko
  - (writers) Billy Pérez, David Omar Rivera Rodriguez
- "Color de Alegría" – Andy Alemany, TWICE, Samuel ASH
  - (writers) Andy Alemany, Ale Berríos, Israel Risco, Samuel Sánchez
- **"Danzando" – Gateway Worship Español, featuring Daniel Calveti, Becky Collazos, Christine D'Clario, Travy Joe, Josh Morales**
  - **(writers) Daniel Calveti, Becky Collazos, Christine D'Clario, Travy Joe, Josh Morales, Jacobo Ramos**
- "Júbilo" – Maverick City Música, Miel San Marcos
  - (writers) Nate Diaz, Josh Morales, Luis Morales Jr, Edward Rivera, Sam Rivera, Daniel Somavilla, Raquel Vega
- "Mi Salvador" – Mosaic MSC
  - (writers) Andres Figueroa, Mariah Goss, Carlos Hernandez, Carlos Pimentel

Spanish Language Album of the Year

- Fe – Ricardo Montaner
  - (producers) Julio Reyes Copello, JonTheProducer, Richi López, Yasmil Marrufo, Ricardo Montaner, Dario Moscatelli, XAXO
- Rojo – Funky
  - (producers) Nelson Onel Diaz, Enoc Hernández, Luis "Funky" Marrero, Eliot El Mago De Oz, Danny Peña, Edward Sánchez, David "Boue" Silveira
- Sana Nuestra Nación – Generación 12
  - (producers) Anthony Catacoli, Bede Benjamin Korporaal
- Venga Tu Reino – Maverick City Música, Maverick City Music
  - (producers) Jonathan Jay, Aaron Moses
- **Viviré – Marcos Witt**
  - **(producers) Carlos Fernando López, Marcos Witt**

=== Worship ===
Worship Recorded Song of the Year

- "God, Turn It Around" – Jon Reddick
  - (writers) Jess Cates, Jon Reddick, Anthony Skinner
- **"Hymn of Heaven" – Phil Wickham**
  - **(writers) Chris Davenport, Bill Johnson, Brian Johnson, Phil Wickham**
- "I Speak Jesus" – Charity Gayle
  - (writers) Abby Benton, Kristen Dutton, Raina Pratt, Carlene Prince, Jesse Reeves, Dustin Smith
- "Jireh - Radio Version" – Maverick City Music, featuring Chandler Moore, Naomi Raine
  - (writers) Chris Brown, Steven Furtick, Chandler Moore, Naomi Raine
- "Know You Will" – Hillsong United
  - (writers) Benjamin Hastings, Joel Houston, Dylan Thomas

Worship Album of the Year

- Are We There Yet? – Hillsong United
  - (producers) Michael Guy Chislett, Joel Houston, Dan McMurray
- Homecoming (Live) – Bethel Music
  - (producers) Justin Amundrud, Mat Ogden, David Whitworth
- **Hymn of Heaven – Phil Wickham**
  - **(producers) Adrian Disch, Jason Ingram, Ran Jackson, Ricky Jackson, Taylor Johnson, Kyle Lee, Jonathan Smith**
- Lion – Elevation Worship
  - (producers) Chris Brown, Steven Furtick, Josh Holiday, Jonathan Mix, Chandler Moore
- Seven – Brooke Ligertwood
  - (producers) Jason Ingram, Brooke Ligertwood

=== Other categories ===
Children's Album of the Year

- **Getty Kids Hymnal - Hymns from Home – Keith & Kristyn Getty, featuring The Getty Girls**
  - **(producers) Fionan de Barra, Keith & Kristyn Getty**
- Sing the Bible, Vol 4 – Slugs and Bugs
  - (producer) Ben Shive
- Worship in the World (Live) – Shane & Shane, Kingdom Kids
  - (producer) Shane Barnard

Christmas / Special Event Album of the Year

- A Family Christmas – We the Kingdom
  - (producer) We the Kingdom
- A Very Maverick Christmas – Maverick City Music
  - (producers) Tony Brown, Jonathan Jay, Brandon Lake
- **Emmanuel: Christmas Songs Of Worship (Live) – Chris Tomlin**
  - **(producer) Ed Cash**
- We Need Christmas – Matthew West
  - (producer) AJ Pruis
- Wonderful – Cain
  - (producers) Steven Curtis Chapman, Kent Hooper, Brent Milligan, Garrett Moshier, Nick Schwarz

Musical/Choral Collection

- Christmas Is a Child
  - (creator) Joel Lindsey, (arranger/orchestrator) Daniel Semsen
- **Give Me Jesus**
  - **(arranger) Phil Nitz**
- Run to the Hope - A Christmas Musical
  - (creators) Karen Peck, Lee Black, Mike Harland, (arranger/orchestrators) Cliff Duren, Phillip Keveren, Phil Nitz, Jay Rouse
- The Amazing Christmas Maze
  - (creators) Dave Clark, Sue C. Smith, (arranger) Dave Clark
- What Christmas Really Means: A Ready to Sing Christmas
  - (creators) Russell Mauldin, Sue C. Smith, (arranger/orchestrator) Russell Mauldin

Recorded Music Packaging of the Year

- **Canyon – Ellie Holcomb**
  - **(art director) Jon Dicus, (photographer) Ashtin Page**
- Lion – Elevation Worship
  - (art directors) Jacob Boyles, Steven Furtick, (graphic artist) Jacob Boyles
- Milk & Honey – Crowder
  - (art directors) David Crowder, Toni Crowder, Shelley Giglio, Leighton Ching, (graphic artist) Leighton Ching, (photographer) Mary Caroline Russell
- Rise Up – Cain
  - (art directors) Quinn Forrer, Tim Parker, (graphic artist) Tim Parker, (photographer) Quinn Forrer
- Seven – Brooke Ligertwood
  - (art directors) Scott Ligertwood, Nicole Scott, Yoseph Setiawan, (photographer) Nolan Knight

=== Videos and films ===
Short Form Video of the Year (Concept)

- "Promised Land" – TobyMac
  - (director) Eric Welch, (producer) Scott McDaniel
- **"Relate" – For King & Country**
  - **(director) Ben Smallbone, (producer) Andrea Royer**
- "Sure Thing" – Hillsong United
  - (director) Ricardo Guzman, (producers) Jessica Ico, Danniebelle Whippy
- "Surviving the Game" – Skillet
  - (director) Jon Vulpine, (producers) Sarah Lacombe, Daniel Livschutz
- "Weary Traveler" – Jordan St. Cyr
  - (directors) Elliott Eicheldinger, Max Hsu

Short Form Video of the Year (Performance)

- "Christ Our King" – Village Lights, featuring Sarah Kroger
  - (director) Nick Romes, (producers) Jason B. Jones, Mack Taylor
- **"Fake It" – Tauren Wells, featuring Aaron Cole**
  - **(director) Mister Noah, (producer) Raj Kapoor**
- "For God Is with Us" – For King & Country
  - (director) Ben Smallbone, (producer) Andrea Royer
- "I Love You" – Judah., featuring Dante Bowe, Aaron Moses
  - (director/producer) Matt DeLisi
- "Magnetic" – Newsboys
  - (directors) Elliott Eicheldinger, Max Hsu, (producers) Matt Brewer, Elliott Eicheldinger, Jeff Frankenstein, Max Hsu

Long Form Video of the Year

- Live In Denver – TobyMac
  - (director) Eric Welch, (producer) Scott McDaniel
- **What Are We Waiting For? | The Worldwide Special – For King & Country**
  - **(director) Ben Smallbone, (producer) Andrea Royer**
- Wild Heart Live at the Cascade Theatre – Kim Walker-Smith
  - (director/producer) Nathan Grubbs

Inspirational Film/Series of the Year

- American Underdog
  - (directors) Andrew Erwin, Jon Erwin, (producers) Kevin Downes, Andrew Erwin, Jon Erwin
- Blue Miracle
  - (director) Julio Quintana, (producers) Javier Chapa, Chris George, Ben Howard, Darren Moorman, Trey Reynolds
- Redeeming Love
  - (director) D. J. Caruso, (producers) Cindy Bond, Wayne Fitzjohn, Michael Scott, Simon Swart, Brittany Yost
- **The Chosen**
  - **(director) Dallas Jenkins, (producers) Chad Gundersen, Chris Juen**
- The Jesus Music
  - (directors) Andrew Erwin, Jon Erwin, (producers) Brandon Gregory, Josh Walsh
