= Anne Wilson (musician) =

American Christian singer

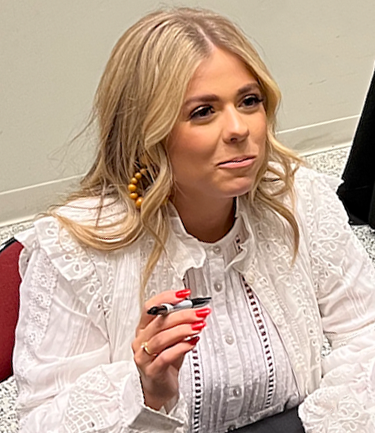
- Wilson in 2022

Background information
- Born: Anne Claire Wilson; February 21, 2002 (age 24); Lexington, Kentucky, U.S.
- Genres: CCM; Christian country
- Occupations: Singer; songwriter
- Years active: 2021–present
- Label: Capitol CMG
- Website: www.annewilsonofficial.com

Anne Claire Wilson (born February 21, 2002) is an American Christian singer and author. Born in Lexington, Kentucky, Wilson felt called by God to pursue a career in Christian music after the death of her older brother, Jacob Kent Wilson. She made her debut in 2021, with the release of the single "My Jesus" through Capitol Christian Music Group. My Jesus (Live in Nashville), Wilson's debut extended play, was released in 2021, with Wilson releasing the full album My Jesus in 2022. Her singles "Seventh of June" and "Living Water" (the latter of which was written for the film Jesus Revolution) were released in 2023. In 2024, she released her second album, Rebel. Wilson released three Christmas songs on the EP I Still Believe in Christmas in 2021. The following year, Wilson released another Christmas EP titled The Manger, and the songs on I Still Believe in Christmas were added to that EP. She did her first Christmas tour in 2025 called the I Still Believe in Christmas Tour.

October she released her new album called Stars. Wilson is a Grammy nominee, as well as a two-time GMA Dove Award winner and three-time K-Love Fan Award winner. "My Jesus" was Wilson's breakthrough hit, having reached number one on Billboard's Hot Christian Songs chart and Bubbling Under Hot 100 chart. My Jesus (Live in Nashville) reached No. 12 on Billboard's Top Christian Albums chart, and Rebel reached No. 1 on the Top Christian Albums chart and No. 10 on the Top Country Albums chart.

== Early life ==
Wilson was born in Lexington, Kentucky, to parents Kent and Lynn Wilson. She lived with her parents and two older siblings, Elizabeth (a fashion designer) and Jacob. Wilson was raised in a Christian home and attended Tates Creek Presbyterian Church throughout most of her childhood. Her family frequently took trips to see her grandparents, who live on a farm in the Kentucky countryside, where she would later film the music video for her song, "Seventh of June".

Wilson learned to play the piano when she was six years old. As a young girl, she aspired to work for NASA as an astronaut. Wilson attended Veritas Christian Academy, a school that her mother helped found. Wilson became a Christian at 12 years old; her faith was reaffirmed after a family tragedy in 2017, when Wilson and her family lost her 23-year-old brother Jacob in a car crash. Wilson says the tragedy brought her "closer to God". Wilson sang in public for the first time at her brother's funeral.

After being asked by friends and family to record a video of her singing "What a Beautiful Name" by Hillsong Worship, Wilson recorded a video and uploaded it to YouTube. After a talent scout came across the video, he showed it to his manager, and the two worked together for several months before sending Wilson, who was 17 at the time, an offer to join Capitol Christian Music Group.

== Career ==
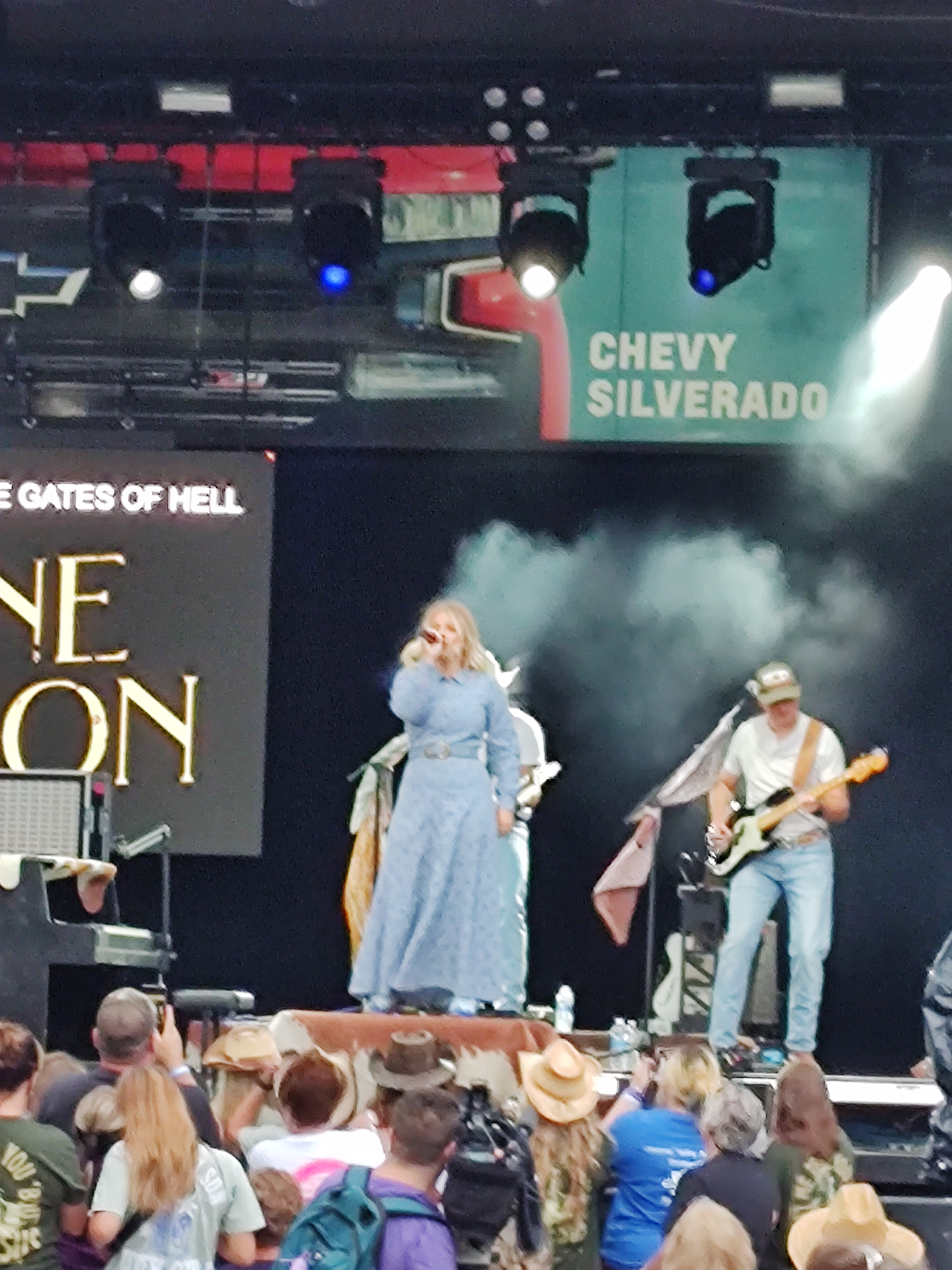
Wilson performing in 2023

=== 2019–2023: Career beginnings and My Jesus ===
Anne Wilson signed a record deal with Capitol Christian Music Group in late 2019. On April 16, 2021, Wilson released "My Jesus" as her debut single. "My Jesus" went on to become Wilson's breakthrough hit single, peaking at number one on the Hot Christian Songs chart, and the Christian Airplay chart. "My Jesus" was nominated for the Billboard Music Award for Top Christian Song at the 2022 Billboard Music Awards. Billboard named Anne Wilson the Top New Christian Artist of 2021. Wilson released her debut studio album, My Jesus, on April 22, 2022, My Jesus debuted at number one on the Top Christian Albums chart, and number 68 on the Billboard 200 chart in the United States, after garnering 13,000 equivalent album units in sales in its first week. Wilson's song, "My Jesus", was nominated for the Top Christian Song Billboard Music Award, making her the only female ever to be nominated for the award. Wilson was nominated for six GMA Dove Awards in 2022: New Artist of the Year, Song of the Year, Pop/Contemporary Recorded Song of the Year, Bluegrass/Country/Roots Recorded Song of the Year, Songwriter of the Year – Artist, and Pop/Contemporary Album of the Year. "My Jesus" won Contemporary Song of the Year, and Wilson won New Artist of the Year.

In 2022, she was nominated for the American Music Award Favorite Inspirational Artist, but ultimately lost to For King & Country. Wilson's album, My Jesus, was nominated for a Grammy Award for Best Contemporary Christian Album. Wilson released a book called My Jesus: From Heartache to Hope in 2022 which focused on her Christianity, her brother Jacob's death, and her career.

On June 7, 2023, Wilson surprised her fans with a new single called "Seventh of June", honoring the memory of her late brother. My Jesus was nominated for the Grammy Award for Best Contemporary Christian Music Album in 2023. On June 16, 2023, Wilson announced her first tour: The My Jesus Tour, with special guest Josh Baldwin. Wilson's debut album, My Jesus, was certified platinum by the Recording Industry Association of America on September 20, 2023.

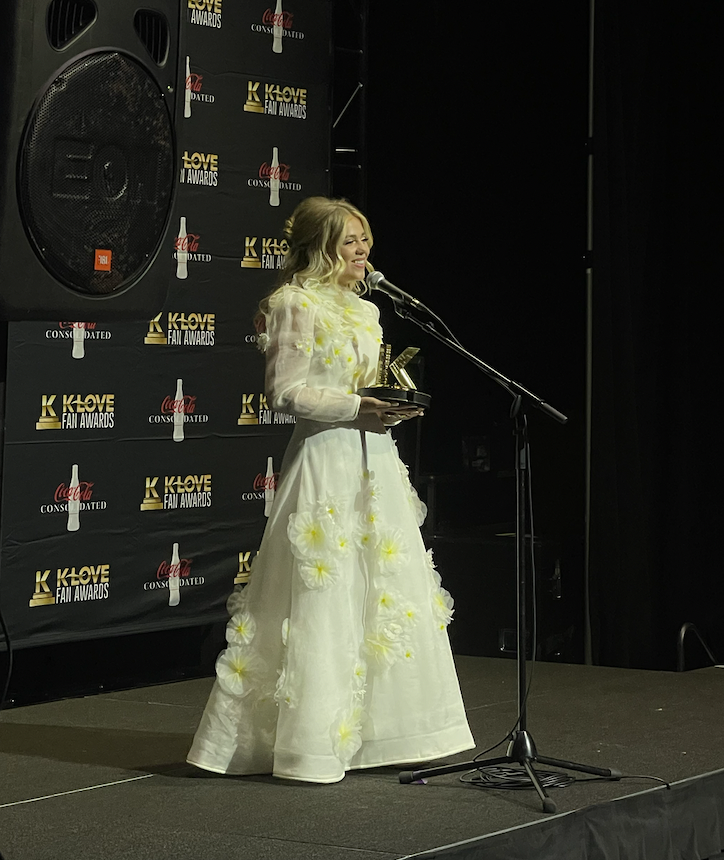
Wilson at the 2024 K-Love Fan Awards

=== 2023–present: Rebel and Stars ===
On September 25, 2023, Wilson released an EP titled Rebel: The Beginning with three songs on it. In 2024, she announced the full album, titled Rebel, was in production. It was released on April 19, 2024, to positive reviews. The album hit No. 1 on Billboard's Christian Albums chart and No. 10 on the Country Album chart. Wilson's The Rebel Tour began on September 9, 2024, in Tulsa, Oklahoma, and ended in Salem, Oregon, on November 17, 2024. Wilson's crowds have been nearly, if not completely, sold out. Wilson is one of CMT's 2024 Next Women of Country.

Following the July 13 attempted assassination of Donald Trump, Wilson posted several original lyrics on social media and asked fans if she should finish the song. Despite several negative reactions, Wilson also received positive responses, and she released the finished result, a single called "Stand", on September 13, 2024. Her concert album Rebel (Live from Lexington) released on October 25.

In June 2025, Wilson released a single titled "God Story", which was a followed with an EP of the same name in August 2025. In October of that year, she released her third album, Stars. She stated that it was inspired by "what I’ve been through in the last few years, the struggles, and the healing, especially this past year". In support of the album, she embarked on another solo concert tour, The STARS Tour, with Peter Burton as a supporting act. In December, Wilson sang at the first-ever Pentagon Christmas worship service. On March 6, 2026, Wilson released a reimagined version of her song "Still Do", a duet with Cole Swindell. In April, Anne Wilson gave a stellar performance of the National Anthem, ahead of NASA's momentous Artemis II launch from Florida's Kennedy Space Center. In May, 2026, Anne Wilson won the Book Impact Award for ‘Hey Girl: You are seen, loved, and made for more’ at the 2026 K-LOVE Fan Awards. Then on June 9, 2026, Anne Wilson released her third book, Rebel: Following Jesus When the World Walks the Other Way. On July 10, Anne Wilson released a new album, Stars: Blue Hour Deluxe, which featured brand new tracks such as "Me & Jesus,” and “Maker’s Mark” with Drew Baldridge.

== Personal life ==
Wilson is a Christian. As of 2021, Wilson lives in Franklin, Tennessee. Wilson has a dog, a brown cocker spaniel-poodle mix, named Annie Oakley..

== Discography ==
=== Studio albums ===
List of studio albums, with selected chart positions
Title	Album details	Peak chart positions				Certifications
Title	Album details	US	US Christ.	US Country	UK C&G	Certifications
My Jesus	Released: April 22, 2022; Label: Capitol CMG; Format: CD, digital download, streaming, vinyl	68	1	—	—	RIAA: Gold
Rebel	Released: April 19, 2024; Label: Capitol CMG; Format: CD, digital download, streaming, vinyl	59	1	10	17	
Stars	Released: October 17, 2025; Label: Capitol CMG, Sparrow; Format: CD, digital download, streaming, vinyl	— (Note: Stars did not enter the Billboard 200, but peaked at No. 14 on the Top Album Sales.)	4	39	—	

=== EPs ===
List of EPs, with selected chart positions
Title	EP details	Peak chart positions
Title	EP details	US Christ.
My Jesus (Live in Nashville)	Released: August 6, 2021; Label: Capitol CMG; Format: CD, digital download, streaming	12
The Manger	Released: October 28, 2022; Label: Capitol CMG; Format: Digital download, streaming	—
God Story	Released: August 1, 2025; Label: Capitol CMG; Format: Digital download, streaming	—
"—" denotes a recording that did not chart

=== Singles ===
==== As lead artist ====
List of singles and peak chart positions
Title	Year	Peak chart positions					Certifications	Album
Title	Year	US	US Christ	US Christ Air	US Christ AC	US Christ Digital	Certifications	Album
"My Jesus"	2021	— (Note: "My Jesus" did not enter the Billboard Hot 100, but peaked at No. 1 on the Bubbling Under Hot 100 chart.)	1	1	1	1	RIAA: 2× Platinum	My Jesus
"I Still Believe in Christmas"	2021	—	15	1	1	23		The Manger (EP)
"Sunday Sermons"	2022	—	5	4	6	3	RIAA: Gold	My Jesus
"Hey Girl"	2022	—	26	21	19	—		My Jesus
"Living Water"	2023	—	20	—	—	6		Non-album single
"Seventh of June"	2023	—	—	—	—	—		Non-album single
"Rain in the Rearview"	2023	—	21	—	—	5		Rebel
"Strong"	2023	—	4	3	2	1		Rebel
"Songs About Whiskey"	2024	—	—	—	—	—		Rebel
"God Story"	2025	—	13	3	5	15		Stars
"Carry Me"	2025	—	40	—	—	—		Stars
"Still Do" (with Cole Swindell)	2026	—	28	—	—	—		Non-album singles
"Who I Am to You"	2026	—	12	19	16	—		Non-album singles
"—" denotes a recording that did not chart

==== As featured artist ====
List of featured singles and peak chart positions
Title	Year	Chart positions				Album
Title	Year	US Christ	US Christ Air	US Christ AC	US Christ Digital	Album
"Emmanuel God with Us" (Chris Tomlin featuring Anne Wilson)	2021	—	—	—	—	Non-album singles
"Me on Your Mind" (Matthew West featuring Anne Wilson)	2022	—	—	—	—	Non-album singles
"Behold" (Phil Wickham featuring Anne Wilson)	2022	8	2	1	15	Non-album singles
"—" denotes a recording that did not chart

=== Promotional singles ===
==== As lead artist ====
List of featured singles
Title	Year	Chart positions	Album
Title	Year	US Christ	Album
"God Thing"	2022	—	My Jesus
"Stars"	2025	40	Stars
"—" denotes a recording that did not chart

==== As featured artist ====
List of featured promotional singles
Title	Year	Album
"Somebody Tell That Girl" (High Valley featuring Anne Wilson)	2022	Way Back

=== Other charted songs ===
List of other charted songs
Title	Year	Chart positions				Album
Title	Year	US Christ	US Christ Air	US Christ AC	US Christ Digital	Album
"Mamas" (with Hillary Scott)	2022	15	—	—	1	My Jesus
"The Manger" (with Josh Turner)	2022	15	38	19	7	The Manger (EP)
"—" denotes a recording that did not chart

== Bibliography ==
- — (October 25, 2022). My Jesus: From Heartache to Hope. Thomas Nelson. ISBN 9781400238231.

== Tours ==
Own tours

- Anne Wilson – The My Jesus Tour (with Josh Baldwin) (2023)
- Anne Wilson – The Rebel Tour (with Jordan Rowe) (2024)
- Anne Wilson – The STARS Tour (2025)

Supporting

- Big Daddy Weave – All Things New Tour (2021)
- Zach Williams – I Don't Want Christmas to End Tour (2021)
- Matthew West – Brand New Tour (2022)
- Zach Williams – Spring '22 Tour (2022)
- Crowder – My People Tour (2022)
- Casting Crowns – Healer Tour (2022)
- Phil Wickham – Behold Christmas Nights (2022)
- Morgan Wallen – I'm the Problem Tour (2025)

== Awards and nominations ==
=== American Music Awards ===
Year	Nominee / work	Award	Result	Ref.
2022	Anne Wilson	Favorite Inspirational Artist	Nominated	

=== Billboard Music Awards ===
Year	Nominee / work	Award	Result	Ref.
2022	"My Jesus"	Top Christian Song	Nominated	

=== GMA Dove Awards ===
Year	Nominee / work	Award	Result	Ref.
2022	"My Jesus"	Song of the Year	Nominated	
2022	"My Jesus"	Pop/Contemporary Recorded Song of the Year	Won	
2022	Anne Wilson	Songwriter of the Year – Artist	Nominated	
2022	Anne Wilson	New Artist of the Year	Won	
2022	"Mamas" (featuring Hillary Scott)	Bluegrass/Country/Roots Recorded Song of the Year	Nominated	
2022	My Jesus	Pop/Contemporary Album of the Year	Nominated	
2026	"Still Do"	Country/Roots Recorded Song of the Year	Nominated	
2026	Stars	Bluegrass/Country/Roots Album of the Year	Nominated	

=== Grammy Awards ===
Year	Nominee / work	Award	Result	Ref.
2023	My Jesus	Best Contemporary Christian Music Album	Nominated	

=== K-Love Fan Awards ===
Year	Nominee / work	Award	Result	Ref.
2022	"My Jesus"	Breakout Single of the Year	Won	
2022	"My Jesus"	Song of the Year	Nominated	
2022	Anne Wilson	Female Artist of the Year	Won	
2023	Anne Wilson	Female Artist of the Year	Nominated	
2024	Anne Wilson	Female Artist of the Year	Won	
2024	Anne Wilson	Artist of the Year	Nominated	
2024	"Strong"	Song of the Year	Nominated	

=== We Love Awards ===
Year	Nominee / work	Award	Result	Ref.
2025	"God Story"	Country / Roots Song of the Year	Won	
