= My Jesus (album) =

2022 studio album by Anne Wilson

Studio album by Anne Wilson
- Released: April 22, 2022
- Recorded: 2021
- Studios: Yoda's Palace Studios, SeeMore Sound, The Glovebox and Sound Emporium Studios (Nashville, Tennessee); The Poole Room and The Castle (Franklin, Tennessee)
- Genres: CCM; Christian country
- Length: 50:08
- Labels: Sparrow; Capitol CMG
- Producers: Jonathan Smith; Avery Wright; Matt Podesla; Jeff Pardo; Jeff Sojka; Ben Glover; Bryan Fowler; Micah Kuiper; Colby Wedgeworth; Bernie Herms

Anne Wilson chronology
My Jesus (Live in Nashville) (2021)	My Jesus (2022)	Rebel (2024)

Singles from My Jesus
- 1. "My Jesus" Released: April 16, 2021; 2. "Sunday Sermons" Released: January 14, 2022; 3. "Hey Girl" Released: September 16, 2022

My Jesus is the debut studio album by American contemporary Christian music singer Anne Wilson, which was released via Capitol Christian Music Group on April 22, 2022. The album features guest appearances by Hillary Scott and Crowder.

The album was supported by the release of "My Jesus," "Sunday Sermons," and "Hey Girl" as singles. The title track reached number one on the US Hot Christian Songs chart, and the Bubbling Under Hot 100 chart. "Sunday Sermons" peaked at number five on the Hot Christian Songs chart. "Hey Girl" peaked at number 26 on the Hot Christian Songs chart. "God Thing" was released as a promotional single.

The album garnered positive reviews from critics who commended Wilson for successfully blending CCM and country genres in a way that appeals to listeners across the genres. The album was a commercial success upon its release, debuting at number one on Billboard's Top Christian Albums chart in the United States. At the 2022 GMA Dove Awards, My Jesus was nominated for the GMA Dove Award for Pop/Contemporary Album of the Year, while the title track was nominated for Song of the Year and won Pop/Contemporary Recorded Song of the Year, and "Mamas" got nominated for Bluegrass/Country/Roots Recorded Song of the Year. The title track was also nominated for the Billboard Music Award for Top Christian Song at the 2022 Billboard Music Awards. The album received a nomination for the Grammy Award for Best Contemporary Christian Music Album at the 2023 Grammy Awards.

== Background ==
Anne Wilson initially attracted publicity, with the release of her cover of "What a Beautiful Name" by Hillsong Worship on YouTube, catching the attention of label executives which resulted in the signing of a record deal with Capitol Christian Music Group toward the end of 2019. Wilson then released her debut single "My Jesus" on April 16, 2021. "My Jesus" became a record-breaking hit for Wilson, marking the largest new artist debut single launch for Capitol Christian Music Group in ten years, and Wilson becoming the first female solo artist to top the Billboard Christian Airplay chart since the chart's launch in 2003. On August 6, 2021, Wilson released her first extended play, My Jesus (Live in Nashville). The EP peaked at number 12 on the Top Christian Albums chart in the United States.

On March 2, 2022, Wilson announced that she will be releasing her debut studio album, My Jesus, on April 22, 2022. Wilson collaborated with songwriters such as Matthew West, Mia Fieldes, Jonathan Smith, Jeff Pardo, Emily Weisband, and Ben Glover among others. Anne Wilson shared the story behind the album, saying:

This record was written over the last two years of my life and is a collection of songs that each mean different things to me. Every song is a different side of me as an artist – country, worship, and radio – songs that speak to the masses and songs that speak to specific people or seasons. I feel like God placed this calling over my life to minister to those who've lost someone and are hurting. With these songs, I want to speak life and joy to people walking through pain and loss.

My Jesus was released on April 22, 2022, with Wilson also announcing the My Jesus Album Launch Livestream Event, slated for April 27, where Wilson would perform songs from the album and discuss the process behind making the record.

== Music and lyrics ==
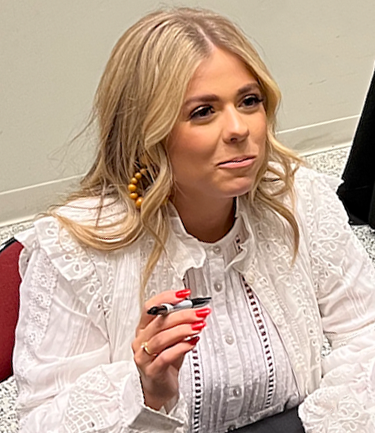
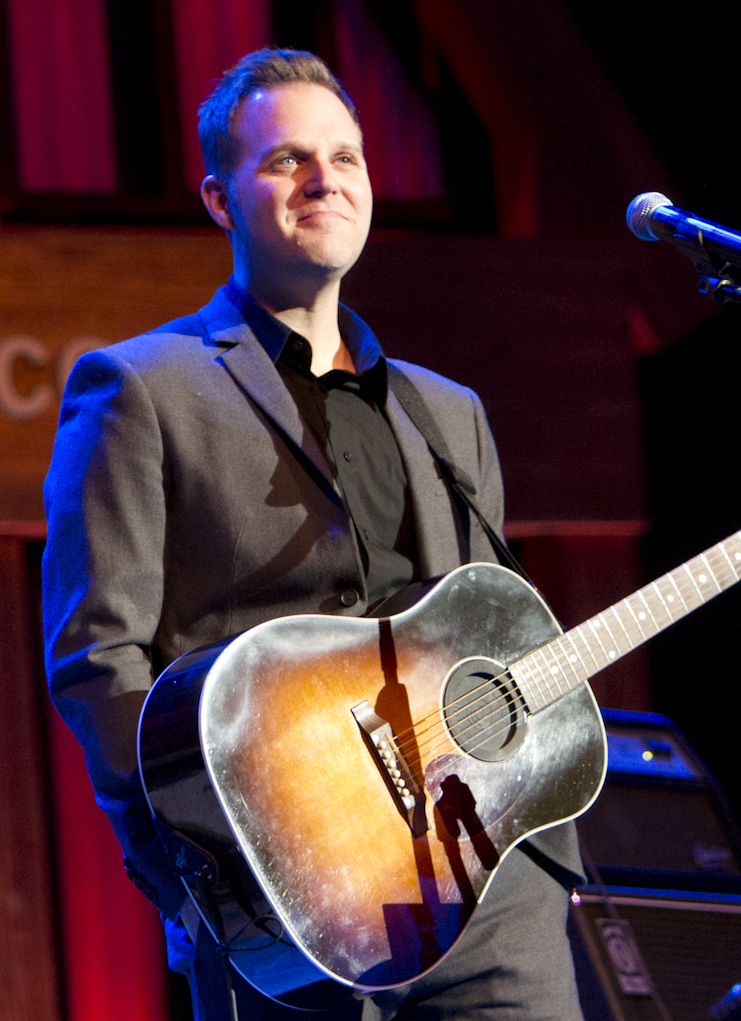
Wilson and Matthew West, along with Jeff Pardo, collaborated on the album's songs.

Musically, Jonathan Andre of 365 Days of Inspiring Media said the album was an attempt to "try and marry both CCM and country together," comparing it to Chris Tomlin's 2020 album Chris Tomlin & Friends. Andre said the album contains "songs of hope, joy and peace." Christopher Wegner of CNTRY classified the album as "country music with a Christian message," while calling Wilson "the female equivalent of Christian superstar Zach Williams," and comparing her voice to Maren Morris. Kelly Meade of Today's Christian Entertainment described the album's sound as a blend of country, gospel and bluegrass. Jesus Freak Hideout's Josh Balogh said the album contains "a veritable smorgasbord of styles with the country genre as its anchor," further explaining that "There's a strong current of gothic country, with a smattering of modern country and radio-ready pop ballads to keep things fresh." Timothy Yap of JubileeCast said the songs were embedded "with a modern country backing that Morgan Wallen or Chris Stapleton would be proud of." Lyrically, Yap observed that the songs were "situated within narrative contexts of Wilson's upbringing and life in Lexington, Kentucky," further adding that "she brings three-dimensional situations, people, and feelings to her songs." CMT described the album as "A rootsy-country collection that displays Wilson's self-discovery while coping with a devastating loss."

The album begins with "Prelude (Scatter)" which sets the tone with a build-up into the second track "Scatter." "Scatter" is "a country-rock head banger," as the lyrics "tell of shouting praises to the Lord until the enemy turns to run at the sound." The third song is the title track, which is "a gospel-infused celebration of the power, love and grace found in Jesus," and "offers heartfelt sentiments to the weary." It is followed by "Devil" which has a "defiant gothic-country sound," as the lyrics "remind us of the limited power the devil actually has." "Sunday Sermons" that exhibits a "grandiose country pop" sound, while it also "transports us into the church as Wilson reminds us how God can utilize an average pastor's message for his glory." "Hey Girl" is "a playful earworm calling women to see themselves as God does." It is succeeded by "This House" which "shows us of the essential nature of the foundation of the word of the Lord." "Mansions" is a track which "celebrates eternal life and what Jesus has instore for those who are part of his kingdom." "Mamas" is a "shuffle-step song," which details "the reasons why we need our mama's in our lives." "No Place Like Home" is a "stripped-down acoustic guitar backed track; this ballad presents many heart-warming vignettes of the times Wilson spent with her sister." "God Thing" is an upbeat song that "moments that cannot be explained by mere reason, but some thing that God intervenes (or even uses) for His glory and our good." "That's What We Need" is a track that points out how "instead of just going through the motions of empty faith, we need to be living out our belief in Jesus and doing what the Bible says." "Something About That Name" serves as a reminder of "how there's something about the power of Jesus's name, that the God we serve and the name of Him we declare from our mouths, has the power to do things we may not perceive possible." "Closer to God" showcases "the trembling vocals of Wilson," as she asserts that "in every circumstance, triumph and even tragedy, God uses to bring us closer to Himself, even if we don't see it in the moment." The album ends with a duet version of the title track featuring Crowder, highlighting their complementary styles.

== Release and promotion ==
=== Singles ===
"My Jesus" was released as a multi-track single containing the title track, "Devil" and "Something About That Name," on April 16, 2021, accompanied with the music video for "My Jesus". "My Jesus" impacted Christian radio in the United States on May 21, 2021. Anne Wilson released a duet version of the song featuring Crowder on October 22, 2021. "My Jesus" peaked at number one on the US Hot Christian Songs chart, the Christian Airplay chart, and the Bubbling Under Hot 100 chart. "My Jesus" was nominated for the Billboard Music Award for Top Christian Song at the 2022 Billboard Music Awards. "My Jesus" received two GMA Dove Award nominations for Song of the Year and Pop/Contemporary Recorded Song of the Year at the 2022 GMA Dove Awards. ultimately winning the Pop/Contemporary Recorded Song of the Year award.

"Sunday Sermons" was released as the second single from the album on January 14, 2022, accompanied with a lyric video of the song. "Sunday Sermons" impacted Christian radio in the United States on February 4, 2022. On March 4, 2022, Anne Wilson released the music video for "Sunday Sermons". "Sunday Sermons" peaked at number five on the Hot Christian Songs chart.

"Hey Girl" impacted Christian radio in the United States on September 16, 2022, becoming the third single from the album. "Hey Girl" peaked at number 26 on the Hot Christian Songs chart.

=== Promotional singles ===
"Hey Girl" was released as the first promotional single from the album on March 4, 2022, concurrently launching the album's pre-order. "God Thing" was released as the final promotional single from the album on April 4, 2022.

=== Other songs ===
On May 4, 2022, Anne Wilson released the music video for "Mamas" with Hillary Scott. "Mamas" peaked at number 15 on the Hot Christian Songs chart. "Mamas" received a GMA Dove Award nomination for Bluegrass/Country/Roots Recorded Song of the Year at the 2022 GMA Dove Awards.

== Reception ==
=== Critical response ===
Professional ratings
Review scores
Source	Rating
365 Days of Inspiring Media	4.5/5
AllMusic	4/5 stars
Jesus Freak Hideout	4/5 stars
JubileeCast	4/5
Today's Christian Entertainment	3.8/5 stars

Jonathan Andre in his 365 Days of Inspiring Media review opined that My Jesus is "any artist's dream start to a hopefully long career, inspiring and encouraging people with Christian country music, a 'genre' that is rare, but nevertheless growing. Well done Anne for this stellar album." CMT said of the album: "The soul-touching record proves that Wilson wears her heart on her sleeve and is truly a crossover artist in the making." Neil Z. Young of AllMusic wrote a positive review of the album, saying, "My Jesus packs substance and an inspirational message into a surprisingly effective and catchy mainstream collection of anthems, an impressive debut from a young artist with plenty of promise." Christopher Wegner, reviewing for CNTRY, said the album contains "consistently catchy and successful songs," and concluded "On My Jesus Anne Wilson shows how really good country music with a Christian message should sound. Her message is never too intrusive, she rather puts the inspiration in the foreground. You will probably hear a lot more from her in the future." Jesus Freak Hideout's Josh Balogh wrote a favourable review of the album, saying "Anne Wilson has the sound, aesthetic, and hit song in "My Jesus," now the only question is, "how high can she fly" moving forward? By all accounts, this reviewer says the sky's the limit, and the future of Christian/Country music looks bright." JubileeCast's Timothy Yap said "this is a fine debut album with attention paid to make you feel like you can be part of the songs' stories." Kelly Meade: indicated in a review at Today's Christian Entertainment: "As a whole, My Jesus is a solid debut. The blend of country, gospel and bluegrass stands out from a lot of mainstream Christian music while the messages within the songs will resonate with listeners beyond the genre. With a firm focus on being real in your faith and the nearness of our Savior, this album will be a welcome addition to many collections."

=== Accolades ===
Awards
Year	Organization	Award	Result	Ref
2022	GMA Dove Awards	Pop/Contemporary Album of the Year	Nominated	
2023	Grammy Awards	Best Contemporary Christian Music Album	Nominated	

Year-end lists
Publication	Accolade	Rank	Ref.
Jesus Freak Hideout	2022 Staff Picks: Alex Caldwell's Album Picks	10	
NewReleaseToday	Best of 2022: Top 10 Albums of the Year	—N/a	

== Commercial performance ==
In the United States, My Jesus debuted at number one on the Top Christian Albums chart in the United States dated May 7, 2022, earning a total of 13,000 equivalent album units in sales in its first week. The album concurrently registered on the mainstream Billboard 200 chart at number 68.

== Track listing ==
My Jesus track listing
No.	Title	Writer(s)	Producer(s)	Length
1.	"Prelude (Scatter)"	Anne Wilson; Jonathan Smith; Mia Fieldes	Jonathan Smith; Avery Wright; Matt Podesla	0:58
2.	"Scatter"	Wilson; Smith; Fieldes	Jonathan Smith	3:14
3.	"My Jesus"	Wilson; Jeff Pardo; Matthew West	Jonathan Smith	3:37
4.	"Devil"	Wilson; Pardo	Jeff Pardo	3:24
5.	"Sunday Sermons"	Wilson; Jeff Sojka; Ben Glover	Jeff Sojka; Ben Glover	3:20
6.	"Hey Girl"	Wilson; Pardo; West	Jeff Pardo	3:08
7.	"This House"	Wilson; Bryan Fowler; Micah Kuiper	Bryan Fowler; Micah Kuiper	3:38
8.	"Mansions"	Wilson; Pardo; West; Paul Duncan	Ben Glover; Jeff Sojka	3:07
9.	"Mamas" (with Hillary Scott)	Wilson; Pardo; West	Ben Glover; Jeff Sojka	3:24
10.	"No Place Like Home"	Wilson; Pardo; West	Jeff Pardo	4:31
11.	"God Thing"	Wilson; Glover; Sojka	Ben Glover; Jeff Sojka	3:19
12.	"That's What We Need"	Wilson; Fowler; Kuiper	Bryan Fowler; Micah Kuiper	3:37
13.	"Something About That Name"	Wilson; Colby Wedgeworth; Ethan Hulse	Colby Wedgeworth	3:32
14.	"Closer to God"	Wilson; Bernie Herms; Emily Weisband	Bernie Herms	3:33
15.	"My Jesus" (featuring Crowder)	Wilson; Pardo; West	Jonathan Smith	3:37
Total length:				50:08

== Personnel ==
Adapted from AllMusic.

Musicians and vocalists

- Anne Wilson – vocals, backing vocals (5, 6)
- Jonathan Smith – programming (1–3, 15), keyboards (1, 2), Hammond B3 organ (1, 2), acoustic guitars (1, 2), banjo (1, 2), mandolin (1, 2), backing vocals (1, 2), acoustic piano (3, 15), organ (3, 15), electric guitars (3, 15)
- Colton Price – programming (1–3, 15)
- Jeff Pardo – acoustic piano (4, 6), Hammond organ (4, 6, 10), programming (4), backing vocals (4, 6), keyboard programming (6)
- Gordon Mote – acoustic piano (5, 8, 9, 11), Hammond B3 organ (5, 8, 9, 11)
- Ben Glover – keyboards (5, 8, 9, 11), programming (5, 8, 9, 11), acoustic guitars (5), electric guitars (5), backing vocals (5, 8, 9, 11)
- Jeff Sojka – keyboards (5, 8, 9, 11), programming (5, 8, 9, 11), drums (5)
- Matt Ulrich – acoustic piano (13), organ (13)
- Colby Wedgeworth – programming (13)
- Bernie Herms – acoustic piano (14), programming (14)
- Fred Williams – programming (14)
- Chad Carouthers – electric guitars (1, 2)
- Courtlan Clement – electric guitars (3, 4, 10, 15), acoustic guitars (4), banjo (4), dobro (4), guitars (6), bass (10)
- Danny Rader – acoustic guitars (3, 15), electric guitars (3, 15)
- Jerry McPherson – electric guitars (5, 8, 9, 11)
- Tim Galloway – guitars (7, 12), resonator guitar (7, 12), banjo (7, 12), mandolin (7, 12)
- Todd Lombardo – acoustic guitar (8, 9, 11)
- Nathan Dugger – acoustic guitars (10), lap steel guitar (10)
- Ethan Hulse – acoustic guitars (13), backing vocals (13)
- Scott Mills – electric guitars (13)
- Luke Fredrickson – acoustic guitars (14), electric guitars (14)
- Tony Lucido – bass (1–4, 6, 13, 15)
- Mark Hill – bass (5, 8, 9, 11)
- Bryan Fowler — bass (7, 12), backing vocals (7, 12)
- Aaron Sterling – drums (1–3, 7, 15)
- Jacob Arnold – drums (4, 6, 12, 13), percussion (6), programming (13)
- Jerry Roe – drums (8, 9, 11)
- Jason Eskridge – backing vocals (1–4, 6, 15), vocal arrangements (1–3, 15), choir vocals (14), choir vocal arrangements (14)
- Kiley Phillips – backing vocals (1–3, 6, 15), choir vocals (14)
- Nickie Conley – backing vocals (4, 6)
- Will Merrell — backing vocals (6)
- Matthew West – backing vocals (6)
- Madeline Howze – backing vocals (7)
- Micah Kuiper – backing vocals (7, 12)
- Calvin Nowell – backing vocals (7)
- Debi Selby – backing vocals (7)
- Hillary Scott – vocals (9)
- Jamie MacDonald – backing vocals (13, 14)
- Crowder – vocals (15)

Gang vocals (Tracks 5 & 8)

- Ben Glover
- Lindsay Glover
- Willie Johnson (5)
- Jeff Sojka
- Anne Wilson (5)

Production

- Josh Bailey – A&R
- Sarah Lindsay Pogue – A&R administrator
- Ken Johnson – production manager (13)
- Trent Nicholson – art direction, packaging
- Aaron Stearns – creative director
- Cameron Powell – photography

Technical credits

- Joe LaPorta – mastering at Sterling Sound (Edgewater, New Jersey)
- Sean Moffitt – mixing (1–10, 12–15)
- Ben Glover – engineer (5)
- Randy Poole – engineer (5)
- Jeff Sojka – engineer (5)
- Dave Clauss – engineer (8, 9, 11), mixing (11)
- Buckley Miller – engineer (10)
- Colton Price – editing (1–3, 15)
- David Cook – editing (3)
- Chris Bevins – additional editing (4, 6, 10)
- Dallan Beck – editing (5, 8, 9, 11)
- Bernie Herms – editing (14)
- Andy Selby – editing (14)
- Jesse Brock – mix assistant (3, 4, 13)
- Warren David — mix assistant (3, 4, 13)
- Corey Haltrman – additional engineer (8, 9, 11)

== Charts ==
=== Weekly charts ===
Weekly chart performance for My Jesus
Chart (2022)	Peak position
US Billboard 200	68
US Top Christian Albums (Billboard)	1

=== Year-end charts ===
Year-end chart performance for My Jesus
Chart (2022)	Position
US Christian Albums (Billboard)	23
Chart (2023)	Position
US Christian Albums (Billboard)	6
Chart (2025)	Position
US Christian Albums (Billboard)	19

== Certifications ==
Region	Certification	Certified units/sales
United States (RIAA)	Gold	500,000^{‡}
^{‡} Sales+streaming figures based on certification alone.

== Release history ==
Release dates and formats for My Jesus
Region	Date	Format	Label	Ref.
Various	April 22, 2022	CD; Digital download; streaming	Sparrow Records; Capitol Christian Music Group	
USA	July 15, 2022	Vinyl	Sparrow Records; Capitol Christian Music Group	
