= My Jesus (song) =

2021 single by Anne Wilson

Single by Anne Wilson

from the album My Jesus
- Released: April 16, 2021
- Genre: CCM
- Length: 3:37
- Label: Sparrow; Capitol CMG
- Songwriters: Anne Wilson; Jeff Pardo; Matthew West
- Producer: Jonathan Smith

Anne Wilson singles chronology
"My Jesus" (2021)	"I Still Believe in Christmas" (2021)

Duet version
- Duet version featuring Crowder

Crowder singles chronology
"In the House" (2021)	"My Jesus" (2021)	"O Holy Night" (2021)

Music videos
- "My Jesus" on YouTube
- "My Jesus" (Lyrics) on YouTube
- "My Jesus" (Live) on YouTube

"My Jesus" is a song by American contemporary Christian music singer Anne Wilson, released on April 16, 2021, as the lead single from her debut studio album, My Jesus (2022). Wilson co-wrote the song with Jeff Pardo and Matthew West.

"My Jesus" peaked at number one on both the US Hot Christian Songs chart and on the Bubbling Under Hot 100 chart. It was nominated for the Billboard Music Award for Top Christian Song at the 2022 Billboard Music Awards. "My Jesus" received two GMA Dove Award nominations for Song of the Year and Pop/Contemporary Recorded Song of the Year at the 2022 GMA Dove Awards, ultimately winning the Pop/Contemporary Recorded Song of the Year award.

== Background ==
On April 16, 2021, Wilson released her multi-track single "My Jesus" as the lead single to her upcoming studio album. She shared the story behind the song, saying:

A few years ago, I went through a season of tragedy. My older brother, Jacob, who was my best friend and someone I looked up to in every way, lost his life in a car accident at the age of 23. That night I heard God's voice so clear and He spoke to me for the first time. He said, "Anne, are you going to trust me or not?" I answered, "Jesus, I trust you." In an instant, Jesus lifted the heavy weight off and told me that He would give me everything I need to get through this. Jesus began to show me that He was a personal God. When people hear to this song, I want them to feel that Jesus is personal; and while our stories may look different, the same Jesus that I call "My Jesus" can be your Jesus too.

== Composition ==
"My Jesus" is composed in the key of [G-flat] with a tempo of 76 beats per minute and a musical time signature of 4/4.

== Reception ==
=== Critical response ===
Joshua Andre of 365 Days of Inspiring Media gave a positive review of "My Jesus", saying: "Anne expertly and skilfully tells us her testimony through a 3 minute tune, that is the Gospel in its purest form."

=== Accolades ===
Awards
Year	Organization	Award	Result	Ref
2022	Billboard Music Awards	Top Christian Song	Nominated	
2022	GMA Dove Awards	Song of the Year	Nominated	
2022	GMA Dove Awards	Pop/Contemporary Recorded Song of the Year	Won	

Year-end lists
Publication	Accolade	Rank	Ref.
365 Days Of Inspiring Media	Top 50 Songs of 2021	18	
365 Days Of Inspiring Media	Top 50 Music Videos of 2021	25	

== Commercial performance ==
"My Jesus" debuted at number 13 on the US Hot Christian Songs chart dated May 1, 2021, concurrently charting at number one on the Christian Digital Song Sales chart. The song was a breakthrough hit, as it went on to reach number one on the Hot Christian Songs chart, and the Christian Airplay chart.

== Music videos ==
On April 16, 2021, Anne Wilson released the official music video for "My Jesus". On June 4, 2021, Anne Wilson released the official lyric video for the song. On July 9, 2021, Anne Wilson released the live performance video of "My Jesus".

== Track listing ==
"My Jesus"
No.	Title	Writer(s)	Producer	Length
1.	"My Jesus"	Anne Wilson; Jeff Pardo; Matthew West	Jonathan Smith	3:37
2.	"Devil"	Wilson; Pardo	Jeff Pardo	3:24
3.	"Something About That Name"	Ethan Hulse; Wilson; Colby Wedgeworth	Colby Wedgeworth	3:32
Total length:				10:34

"My Jesus" (featuring Crowder)
No.	Title	Length
1.	"My Jesus" (featuring Crowder)	3:37

== Personnel ==
Adapted from AllMusic.

- Jacob Arnold — drums, programmer
- Chris Bevins — editing
- Jesse Brock — mixing assistant
- Court Clement — acoustic guitar, banjo, Dobro
- Courtlan Clement — electric guitar
- Nickie Conley — background vocals
- David Cook — editing
- Warren David — mixing assistant
- Jason Eskridge — background vocals, choir arrangement, vocal arrangement
- Ethan Hulse — acoustic guitar, background vocals
- Joe LaPorta — mastering engineer
- Tony Lucido — Bass
- James MacDonald — background vocals
- Scott Mills — electric guitar
- Sean Moffitt — mixing
- Jeff Pardo — background vocals, Hammond B3, piano, producer, programmer, vocal producer,
- Kiely Phillips — background vocals
- Colton Price — editing, programmer
- Danny Rader — acoustic guitar, electric guitar
- Jonathan Smith — electric guitar, organ, piano, producer, programmer
- Aaron Sterling — drums
- Matt Ulrich — organ, piano
- Colby Wedgeworth — producer, programmer
- Anne Wilson — primary artist, vocals

== Charts ==
=== Weekly charts ===
Weekly chart performance for "My Jesus"
Chart (2021)	Peak position
US Bubbling Under Hot 100 (Billboard)	1
US Christian Songs (Billboard)	1
US Christian Airplay (Billboard)	1
US Christian AC (Billboard)	1

=== Year-end charts ===
Year-end chart performance for "My Jesus"
Chart (2021)	Position
US Christian Songs (Billboard)	6
US Christian Airplay (Billboard)	5
US Christian AC (Billboard)	6
Chart (2022)	Position
US Christian Songs (Billboard)	22
US Christian Airplay (Billboard)	48

== Certifications ==
Region	Certification	Certified units/sales
United States (RIAA)	2× Platinum	2,000,000^{‡}
^{‡} Sales+streaming figures based on certification alone.

== Release history ==
Release dates and formats for "My Jesus"
Region	Date	Version	Format	Label	Ref.
Various	April 16, 2021	Original	Digital download; streaming	Sparrow; Capitol CMG	
United States	May 21, 2021	Original	Christian adult contemporary radio; Christian contemporary hit radio	Sparrow; Capitol CMG	
Various	October 22, 2021	Duet (featuring Crowder)	Digital download; streaming	Sparrow; Capitol CMG	
