= Jeff Pardo =

American Christian musician (born 1981)

- Also known as: Jeff
- Born: Jeffrey Thomas Pardo; December 18, 1981 (age 44); Chicago, Illinois
- Origin: Nashville, Tennessee
- Occupations: music producer, composer, songwriter
- Instrument: Multi-instrumentalist
- Years active: 2003–present

Jeffrey Thomas Pardo (born December 18, 1981) is an American Christian musician, who is mainly a music producer, songwriter, and composer. He has received a Grammy Award nomination at the 55th Annual Grammy Awards.

== Early life ==
Pardo was born, Jeffrey Thomas Pardo, on December 18, 1981, in Chicago, Illinois. He relocated to Nashville to become a musician.

== Music career ==
His music production songwriting career began about 2003 and he was nominated for a Grammy Award at the 55th Annual Grammy Awards in the Best Contemporary Christian Music Song category. He was a co-writer with Rhett Walker Band's Rhett Walker Canipe on the single, "When Mercy Found Me".

== Awards and nominations ==
=== GMA Dove Awards ===
Year	Nominee / work	Award	Result	Ref.
2022	"Come What May" (Note: Pardo was credited as a co-writer on "Come What May" by We Are Messengers.) (We Are Messengers)	Song of the Year	Nominated	
2022	"My Jesus" (Note: Pardo was credited as a co-writer on "My Jesus" by Anne Wilson.) (Anne Wilson)	Song of the Year	Nominated	
2022	"My Jesus" (Anne Wilson)	Pop/Contemporary Recorded Song of the Year	Won	
2022	"In Jesus Name (God of Possible)" (Note: Pardo was credited as a co-writer on "In Jesus Name (God of Possible)" by Katy Nichole.) (Katy Nichole)	Pop/Contemporary Recorded Song of the Year	Nominated	
2022	Jeff Pardo	Producer of the Year	Won	
2022	My Jesus (Note: Pardo was credited as a producer on My Jesus by Anne Wilson.) (Anne Wilson)	Pop/Contemporary Album of the Year	Nominated	
2022	Rise Up (Note: Pardo was credited as a producer on Rise Up by Cain.) (Cain)	Pop/Contemporary Album of the Year	Nominated	
2022	"God Is Good" (Note: Pardo was credited as a co-writer on "God Is Good" by Francesca Battistelli.) (Francesca Battistelli)	Inspirational Recorded Song of the Year	Nominated	
2022	"Mamas" (Note: Pardo was credited as a co-writer on "Mamas" by Anne Wilson featuring Hillary Scott) (Anne Wilson featuring Hillary Scott)	Bluegrass/Country/Roots Recorded Song of the Year	Nominated	
2026	Himself	Producer of the Year	Pending	

=== Grammy Awards ===
Year	Nominee / work	Award	Result	Ref.
2013	"When Mercy Found Me" (Note: Pardo is credited as a co-writer of "When Mercy Found Me" performed by Rhett Walker Band.)	Best Contemporary Christian Music Song	Nominated	
