= Top Christian Albums =

Number one album in Christian music in the United States

Top Christian Albums is a weekly chart published in Billboard magazine that ranks the best-performing Christian albums in the United States. Like the Billboard 200, the data is compiled by Nielsen Soundscan based on each album's weekly physical and digital sales, as well as on-demand streaming and digital sales of its individual tracks. The chart was introduced on the magazine issue dated March 29, 1980, under the title "Best Selling Inspirational LPs". The current name was adopted on August 16, 2003, in an effort to "streamline" chart titles. The first number-one album was Candle's Music Machine. Amy Grant's Age to Age, released in 1982, topped the chart for 85 consecutive weeks, the longest for any album on the chart.

The current number-one album on the chart is Damascus Road by Josiah Queen.

== Artist milestones ==
=== Most number-one albums ===
Artist	No.	Ref.
Amy Grant	17	
Michael W. Smith	16	
MercyMe	12	
Steven Curtis Chapman	9	
Passion	9	
Lecrae	9	
Elevation Worship	9	
Hillsong United	8	
Chris Tomlin	8	
Casting Crowns	8	
Third Day	7	
Newsboys	7	
Jeremy Camp	7	
Hillsong Worship	7	
TobyMac	7	

=== Most cumulative weeks at number one ===
Artist	Wks.	Ref.
Amy Grant	333	
Lauren Daigle	121	
Sandi Patti	112	
Kanye West	106	
Forrest Frank	92	
Michael W. Smith	86	
Kirk Franklin	79	
Carman	64	
Steven Curtis Chapman	62	
Casting Crowns	61	
MercyMe	60	
P.O.D.	54	
dc Talk	53	
Switchfoot	48	
Petra	44	

== Album milestones ==
=== Most cumulative weeks at number one ===
The following albums have spent at least 30 cumulative weeks atop the chart:

Artist	Wks.	Years	Album	Ref.
Lauren Daigle	102	2018–23	Look Up Child	
Kanye West	98	2021–24	Donda	
Amy Grant	85	1982–84	Age to Age	
Sandi Patty	68	1986–88	Morning Like This	
Amy Grant	61	1984–85	Straight Ahead	
Forrest Frank	59	2025–26	Child of God II	
dc Talk	38	1993–94	Free at Last	
Switchfoot	38	2004–05	The Beautiful Letdown	
Forrest Frank	37	2024–25	Child of God	
Amy Grant	36	1985–86	Unguarded	
Amy Grant	36	1988–89	Lead Me On	
LeAnn Rimes	35	1997–98	You Light Up My Life: Inspirational Songs	
P.O.D.	35	2001–02	Satellite	
Carman	34	1989–90	Revival In the Land	

=== Most consecutive weeks at number one ===
The following albums have spent at least 25 consecutive weeks atop the chart:

Artist	Wks.	Years	Album	Ref.
Amy Grant	85	1982–84	Age to Age	
Amy Grant	61	1984–85	Straight Ahead	
Sandi Patty	40	1986–87	Morning Like This	
Lauren Daigle	37	2018–19	Look Up Child	
Amy Grant	36	1985–86	Unguarded	
LeAnn Rimes	35	1997–98	You Light Up My Life: Inspirational Songs	
Forrest Frank	34	2026	Child of God II	
Amy Grant	28	1988–89	Lead Me On	
Amy Grant	25	1987–88	The Collection	

=== Most weeks on the chart ===
The following albums have spent at least 200 weeks on the chart:

Key
Album currently charting, as of Issue November 14, 2026

No.	Artist	Wks.	Album	Ref.
1	Skillet	651	Awake †	
2	Lauren Daigle	602	How Can It Be †	
3	Hillsong United	570	Zion †	
4	Chris Tomlin	548	How Great Is Our God: The Essential Collection †	
5	Elevation Worship	511	Here as in Heaven †	
6	Skillet	485	Unleashed †	
7	Alan Jackson	471	Precious Memories Collection †	
8	Hillsong Worship	462	Let There Be Light †	
9	MercyMe	454	I Can Only Imagine: The Very Best of MercyMe	
10	Flyleaf	439	Flyleaf	
11	Lauren Daigle	426	Look Up Child	
12	NF	422	Therapy Session †	
13	Zach Williams	394	Chain Breaker †	
14	NF	389	Mansion †	
15	Amy Grant	381	The Collection	
16	Kanye West	367	Jesus Is King	
17	Elevation Worship	340	Graves into Gardens	
18	Casting Crowns	334	Voice of Truth: The Ultimate Collection	
19	Zach Williams	328	Rescue Story	
20	Elvis Presley	315	Elvis: Ultimate Gospel	
21	For King & Country	308	Run Wild. Live Free. Love Strong.	
22	Hillsong Worship	300	There Is More	
23	CeCe Winans	295	Believe for It	
24	Elevation Worship and Maverick City Music	288	Old Church Basement	
25	Amy Grant	286	Age to Age	
26	tobyMac	285	This Is Not a Test	
27	Kanye West	271	Donda	
28	For King & Country	268	Burn the Ships	
29	Sandi Patty	257	More Than Wonderful	
30	Casting Crowns	255	Only Jesus	
31	Sandi Patty	237	Hymns Just for You	
32	Anne Wilson	236	My Jesus	
33	MercyMe	230	Lifer †	
34	Tauren Wells	212	Hills and Valleys	
35	Skillet	207	Comatose	

== Other achievements ==
- Forrest Frank became the first artist to replace himself at number one on the chart; Frank's album of Child of God II dethroned his album Child of God on May 24, 2025. He repeated the achievement on July 26, 2025.

== Number ones ==
- 1980s
- 1990s
- 2000s
- 2010s
- 2020s

== See also ==
- Hot Christian Songs
- Top Holiday Albums
- Official Christian & Gospel Albums Chart (UK)
