= Building 429 discography =

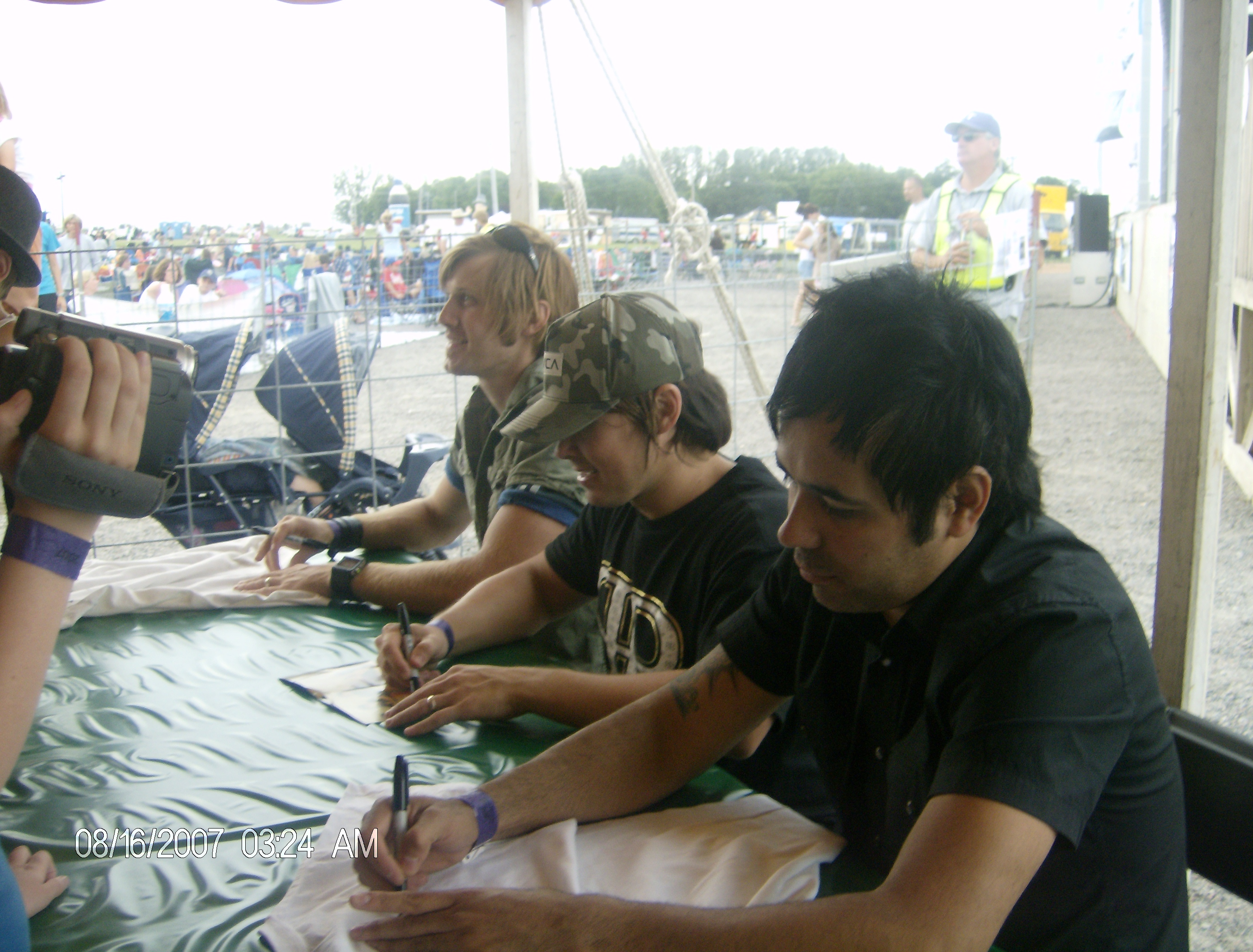
- Studio albums: 10
- Extended plays: 4
- Compilation albums: 4
- Singles: 23

A list of the discography of Christian rock band Building 429.

== Albums ==
Year	Title	Chart positions		
Year	Title	US	US Christ.	US Rock
2000	Building 429: 1st studio album; Released: 2000; Label: Independently Released	—	—	—
2002	Flight: 2nd studio album; Released: 2002; Label: Independently Released	—	—	—
2004	Space in Between Us: 3rd studio album; Released: July 27, 2004; Deluxe edition released in 2005; Label: Word Records	—	8	—
2006	Rise: 4th studio album; Released: March 14, 2006; Label: Reunion Records	81	3	—
2007	Iris to Iris: 5th studio album; Released: May 1, 2007; Label: Word Records	140	4	—
2008	Building 429: 6th studio album; Released: October 21, 2008; Label: INO Records	119	3	49
2011	Listen to the Sound: 7th studio album; Released: May 10, 2011; Label: Reunion	115	2	31
2013	We Won't Be Shaken: 8th studio album; Released: June 4, 2013; Label: Essential/Provident	53	1	20
2015	Unashamed: 9th studio album; Released: September 25, 2015; Label: Reunion	46	2	11
2018	Live the Journey: 10th studio album; Released: September 7, 2018; Label: Essential	—	— (Note: Live the Journey did not enter the Billboard Top Christian Albums chart, but peaked at number 12 on the Billboard Christian Album Sales chart.)	—

== EPs ==
Year	Title	Chart positions
Year	Title	USChrist.
2002	Preflight: 1st EP; Released: 2002; Label: Independently Released	—
2004	Glory Defined: 2nd EP; Released: March 2, 2004; Label: Word Records	33
2009	6 Picks: Essential Radio Hits from Building 429: 3rd EP; Released: February 3, 2009; Label: Word Records	—
2012	Give Me Jesus (Live from Winter Jam): 4th EP; Released: August 31, 2012; Label: Provident Label Group	—
2019	Fear No More: 5th EP; Released: August 9, 2019; Label: 3rd Wave	—
2019	A Thrill of Hope: 6th EP (and first Christmas EP); Released: November 15, 2019; Label: 3rd Wave	—
2020	Remember: A Worship Collection: 7th EP; Released: 29 May 2020; Label: 3rd Wave	—
2020	Hope Is Here: 8th EP (and second Christmas EP); Released: 20 November 2020; Label: 3rd Wave	—

Building 429 also released some studio series performance tracks for the following songs: "We Won't Be Shaken", "Where I Belong", "Fearless", "Walls Are Coming Down", "No One Else Knows", "Listen to the Sound", "I Belong to You", "Grace That Is Greater", "Power of Your Name", "You Carried Me", "I Believe", "Glory Defined" and "Space In Between Us".

== Compilations ==
Year	Title	Chart positions
Year	Title	USChrist.
2008	Glory Defined: The Best of Building 429: 1st compilation; Released: June 3, 2008; Label: Word Records	—
2010	Top Ten: 2nd compilation; Released: August 3, 2010; Label: Word Records	—
2014	The Ultimate Collection: 3rd compilation; Released: December 23, 2014; Label: Word Records	39
2017	Glory Defined: The Biggest Hits of Building 429: 4th compilation; Released: October 27, 2017; Label: Word Records	—

== Singles ==
List of singles, with selected chart positions
Title	Year	Peak chart positions					Certifications	Album
Title	Year	US Bub.	US Heat.	US Rock	US Christ.	Christ. Airplay	Certifications	Album
"Glory Defined"	2004	—	—	—	1			Space in Between Us
"Above It All"	2004	—	—	—	—			Space in Between Us
"The Space in Between Us"	2004	—	—	—	7			Space in Between Us
"No One Else Knows"	2005	—	—	—	16			Space in Between Us
"We Three Kings"	2005	—	—	—	14			WOW Christmas: Green
"Searching for a Savior"	2006	—	—	—	—			Rise
"Fearless"	2006	—	—	—	40			Rise
"I Belong to You"	2006	—	—	—	26			Rise
"I Believe"	2006	—	—	—	15			Rise
"Grace That Is Greater"	2007	—	—	—	—			Iris to Iris
"Singing Over Me"	2007	—	—	—	16			Iris to Iris
"End of Me"	2008	—	—	—	10			Building 429
"Always"	2009	—	—	—	24			Building 429
"Listen to the Sound"	2011	—	—	—	4			Listen to the Sound
"Where I Belong"	2011	19	20	25	1		RIAA: Gold	Listen to the Sound
"Right Beside You"	2012	—	—	—	16			Listen to the Sound
"Hark! The Herald Angels Sing"	2013	—	—	—	—	—		Non-album single
"We Won't Be Shaken"	2013	—	—	—	2			We Won't Be Shaken
"Press On" (featuring Blanca Callahan)	2014	—	—	—	7	3		We Won't Be Shaken
"Saving Christmas"	2014	—	—	—	—	—		Non-album single
"Impossible"	2015	—	—	—	13	12		Unashamed
"Unashamed"	2016	—	—	—	24	18		Unashamed
"This Place"	2018	—	—	—	—	—		Non-album single
"You Can"	2018	—	—	—	—	33		Live the Journey
"Glory"	2018	—	—	—	—	—		Non-album single
"Fear No More"	2019	—	—	—	11	4		Fear No More (EP)
"Don't You (Forget About Me)"	2020	—	—	—	—	—		Non-album singles
"Different"	2020	—	—	—	—	—		Non-album singles
"Not Finished Yet"	2021	—	—	—	50	39		Non-album singles
"Give Him Praise"	2026	—	—	—	—	—		Non-album singles
"—" denotes releases that did not chart

== Music videos ==
List of music videos, showing year released and director
Title	Year	Director(s)
"Glory Defined"	2004	
"Always"	2009	
"Listen to the Sound"	2011	
"Where I Belong"	2012	
"Right Beside You"	2012	
"We Won't Be Shaken (official lyric video)	2013	
"Building 429 - My Jesus, I Love Thee (Your Holy Name)"	2013	
"White Flag" (official lyric video)	2014	
"Press On" (featuring Blanca Callahan)"	2014	
"Impossible" (official lyric video)	2015	
"Unashamed" (official lyric video)	2016	
"Be With Us Now (Emmanuel)" (official lyric video)	2016	
"You Can"	2018	
"Fear No More"	2019	
