= Bless Me =

2022 song by Maverick City Music and Kirk Franklin

Promotional single by Maverick City Music and Kirk Franklin

from the album Kingdom Book One
- Released: June 3, 2022
- Recorded: March 2022
- Venue: Everglades Correctional Institution, Miami-Dade, Florida, US
- Genre: Contemporary gospel
- Length: 4:32
- Label: Tribl; Fo Yo Soul; RCA Inspiration
- Songwriter: Kirk Franklin

Music video
- "Bless Me" on YouTube

"Bless Me" is a song performed by American contemporary worship collective Maverick City Music and American gospel musician Kirk Franklin. The song was released on May 20, 2022, as a promotional single from their collaborative live album, Kingdom Book One (2022). The song was written by Kirk Franklin.

"Bless Me" debuted at number 19 on the US Hot Christian Songs chart, and at number eight on the Hot Gospel Songs chart.

== Background ==
On June 3, 2022, Maverick City Music and Kirk Franklin released "Bless Me" as the second promotional single from Kingdom Book One (2022), accompanied with its music video. The song follows after the release of "Kingdom" as the first promotional single from the album.

== Composition ==
"Bless Me" is composed in the key of B♭ with a tempo of 68 beats per minute and a musical time signature of 4/4.

== Accolades ==
Awards
Year	Organization	Award	Result	Ref
2023	GMA Dove Awards	Contemporary Gospel Recorded Song of the Year	Nominated	

Year-end lists
Publication	Accolade	Rank	Ref.
Jesus Freak Hideout	2022 Staff Picks: Josh Balogh's Song Picks	2	

== Commercial performance ==
"Bless Me" debuted at number 19 on the US Hot Christian Songs chart, and number eight on the Hot Gospel Songs chart dated June 18, 2022.

== Music video ==
On June 3, 2022, Kirk Franklin released the official music video of "Bless Me" via YouTube. The video shows Kirk Franklin and Maverick City Music performing the song alongside inmates at the Everglades Correctional Institution in Miami-Dade, Florida.

== Charts ==
=== Weekly charts ===
Weekly chart performance for "Bless Me"
Chart (2022)	Peak position
US Hot Christian Songs (Billboard)	19
US Gospel Songs (Billboard)	8

=== Year-end charts ===
Year-end chart performance for "Bless Me"
Chart (2022)	Position
US Christian Songs (Billboard)	61
US Gospel Songs (Billboard)	17
Chart (2023)	Position
US Gospel Songs (Billboard)	13

== Release history ==
Release history for "Bless Me"
Region	Date	Format	Label	Ref.
Various	June 3, 2022	Digital download; streaming; (promotional release)	Tribl Records; Fo Yo Soul Entertainment; RCA Inspiration	
