= Fear Is Not My Future =

2022 single by Maverick City Music and Kirk Franklin

Single by Maverick City Music and Kirk Franklin featuring Brandon Lake and Chandler Moore

from the album Kingdom Book One
- Released: November 4, 2022
- Recorded: March 2022
- Venue: Everglades Correctional Institution, Miami-Dade, Florida, US
- Genre: Contemporary worship
- Length: 10:25 (album version); 4:02 (radio version)
- Label: Tribl; Fo Yo Soul; RCA Inspiration
- Songwriters: Brandon Lake; Jonathan Jay; Hannah Shackelford; Nicole Hannel
- Producers: Tony Brown; Jonathan Jay; Kirk Franklin; Chandler Moore; Norman Gyamfi

Maverick City Music singles chronology
"God Really Loves Us" (2022)	"Fear Is Not My Future" (2022)	"Mary, Did You Know?" (2022)

Kirk Franklin singles chronology
"Afro Gospel Mashup" (2022)	"Fear Is Not My Future" (2022)	"All Things" (2023)

Brandon Lake singles chronology
"Graves" (2022)	"Fear Is Not My Future" (2022)	"Plead the Blood" (2023)

Chandler Moore singles chronology
"Dependable" (2022)	"Fear Is Not My Future" (2022)	"Mary, Did You Know?" (2022)

Music videos
- "Fear Is Not My Future" on YouTube
- "Fear Is Not My Future" (Song Session) on YouTube

"Fear Is Not My Future" is a song performed by American contemporary worship collective Maverick City Music and American gospel musician Kirk Franklin featuring American singers Brandon Lake and Chandler Moore. The radio version of the song was released on November 4, 2022, becoming the lead single from their collaborative live album, Kingdom Book One (2022). Brandon Lake had originally released the song featuring Chandler Moore on his third studio album, Help! (2022). The song was written by Brandon Lake, Hannah Shackelford, Jonathan Jay, and Nicole Hannel. At the 2023 GMA Dove Awards, "Fear Is Not My Future" was nominated for Song of the Year and Worship Recorded Song of the Year awards.

"Fear Is Not My Future" debuted at number 13 on the US Hot Christian Songs chart, and at number four on the Hot Gospel Songs chart. The song received a nomination for the Grammy Award for Best Contemporary Christian Music Performance/Song at the 2023 Grammy Awards.

== Background ==
Brandon Lake originally released "Fear Is Not My Future" with Chandler Moore as the eighth track on his third studio album, Help!, on May 13, 2022. Lake shared the story behind the song, saying:

What a declaration and amazing thing to sing. Fear is not my future, sickness is not my story. There's so many things in our life that we’re like this is what I've been given and I have to deal with it. I felt like this would be a powerful opportunity to break that agreement and say no. Goodbye fear, goodbye pain, goodbye to the grave that you feel like you're standing in. Let's do the opposite and let's prophecy hello peace, hello joy, hello love.

On June 17. 2022, Maverick City Music and Kirk Franklin released the live version of the song featuring Lake and Moore as the second track on their collaborative live album, Kingdom Book One, along with the song's official music video.

== Composition ==
"Fear Is Not My Future" is composed in the key of E♭ with a tempo of 69 beats per minute and a musical time signature of 4/4.

== Reception ==
=== Critical response ===
Katie Cline of Air1 gave a favorable opinion of the song, saying: "In “Fear is Not My Future,” Brandon Lake and Chandler David Moore’s voices restore hope to our troubled minds, bidding farewell to sickness, heartbreak, and death as we embrace the peace, love, and joy of Christ in our lives." Briauna Prieto of Peer Magazine wrote a positive review of the song, saying: "With a typical build and repetitive lyrics, this song is easy to catch on to. It's also full of long musical interludes that Maverick City incorporates into so many of their songs, giving plenty of room to have your own personal reflection during the song."

=== Awards and nominations ===
Awards
Year	Organization	Award	Result	Ref
2023	Grammy Awards	Best Contemporary Christian Music Performance/Song	Won	
2023	GMA Dove Awards	Song of the Year	Nominated	
2023	GMA Dove Awards	Worship Recorded Song of the Year	Nominated	
2024	ASCAP Christian Music Awards	Most Performed ASCAP Christian Songs of 2023	Won	

== Commercial performance ==
"Fear Is Not My Future" debuted at number 26 on the US Hot Christian Songs chart, and number 11 on the Hot Gospel Songs chart dated July 2, 2022.

== Music videos ==
On June 17, 2022, Maverick City Music and Kirk Franklin released the music video of "Fear Is Not My Future" featuring Brandon Lake and Chandler Moore, filmed at Mother Emmanuel AME Church in Charleston, South Carolina. The music video's release is in remembrance of the Charleston church shooting which occurred at the church seven years prior on June 17, 2015.

On June 20, 2022, Essential Worship released an acoustic performance video of the song, with Brandon Lake and Chandler Moore leading the song.

== Charts ==
=== Weekly charts ===
Weekly chart performance for "Fear Is Not My Future"
Chart (2022–2023)	Peak position
US Hot Christian Songs (Billboard)	13
US Christian Airplay (Billboard)	17
US Christian AC (Billboard)	18
US Gospel Songs (Billboard)	4

=== Year-end charts ===
Year-end chart performance for "Fear Is Not My Future"
Chart (2022)	Position
US Christian Songs (Billboard)	82
US Gospel Songs (Billboard)	30
Chart (2023)	Position
US Christian Songs (Billboard)	38
US Christian Airplay (Billboard)	33
US Christian AC (Billboard)	25
US Gospel Songs (Billboard)	4

== Release history ==
Release dates and formats for "Fear Is Not My Future"
Region	Date	Format	Label	Ref.
Various	November 4, 2022	Digital download; streaming	Tribl Records	

== Other versions ==
- Todd Galberth released his own rendition of "Fear Is Not My Future" which featured Tasha Cobbs Leonard on his album, Encounter (2022).
