= Unashamed =

Unashamed may refer to:

- Unashamed (band), a Christian hardcore punk band
- Unashamed (album), a 2015 album by Building 429
- Unashamed (film), a 1932 American pre-Code film
