= Glory Defined: The Best of Building 429 =

Greatest hits album by Building 429
- Released: June 3, 2008
- Genre: Christian rock
- Length: 60:14
- Label: Word Records

Building 429 chronology
Iris to Iris (2007)	Glory Defined: The Best of Building 429 (2008)	Building 429 (2008)

Professional ratings
Review scores
Source	Rating
Allmusic	4/5 stars
christianmusicreview.org	8.8/10

Glory Defined: The Best of Building 429 is an album by Christian rock band Building 429, which was released on June 3, 2008, through Word Records. This recording is the band's first compilation album.

== Track listing ==
Album release
No.	Title	Writer(s)	Originally recorded on	Length
1.	"Glory Defined"	Jim Cooper, Kenny Lamb, Jason Roy	Space in Between Us	3:23
2.	"Show Me Love"	Roy	Space in Between Us	3:41
3.	"Above It All"	Roy	Space in Between Us	4:43
4.	"No One Else Knows"	Roy, Jason Ingram	Space in Between Us	4:21
5.	"The Space In Between Us"	Cooper, Roy	Space in Between Us	4:11
6.	"Shadow of Angels"	Roy	Space in Between Us	3:55
7.	"Fearless"	Jesse Garcia, Roy	Rise	3:35
8.	"I Belong to You"	Roy	Rise	3:48
9.	"I Believe"	Roy	Rise	3:39
10.	"You Carried Me" (Edit)	Roy	Iris to Iris	4:00
11.	"Singing Over Me"	Roy	Iris to Iris	4:00
12.	"Majesty"	Roy	Iris to Iris	4:47
13.	"Power of Your Name"	Roy	Iris to Iris	4:32
14.	"Grace That Is Greater"	Roy	Iris to Iris	4:09
15.	"Glory Defined" (Alternate Version)		Space in Between Us (Expanded Edition)	3:30
Total length:				60:14
