= Glory Defined =

EP by Building 429
- Released: March 2, 2004
- Genre: Christian rock
- Label: Word
- Producer: Jim Copper

Building 429 chronology
Flight (2002)	Glory Defined (2004)	Space in Between Us (2004)

Professional ratings
Review scores
Source	Rating
AllMusic	4/5 stars
Jesus Freak Hideout	0.5/5 stars
Jesus Freak Hideout (2nd review)	1.5/5 stars

Glory Defined is an EP by the Christian rock band Building 429, which was released in 2004. The recording was made and distributed to promote the band's third full-length album entitled, Space in Between Us. Glory Defined was also the band's major-label debut and contained their first number one hit, "Glory Defined".

== Track listing ==
No.	Title	Writer(s)	Length
1.	"Glory Defined"	Jim Cooper, Kenny Lamb, Jason Roy	3:24
2.	"Show Me Love"	Jason Roy	3:42
3.	"Free"	Jason Roy	4:01
4.	"The Space In Between Us (Unplugged)"	Jim Cooper, Jason Roy	4:11
5.	"All You Ask Of Me"	Jason Roy, Jason Ingram	3:54
6.	"Glory Defined (Alternate Version)"	Jim Cooper, Kenny Lamb, Jason Roy	3:31

== Awards ==
On 2005, the title song was nominated for two Dove Awards: Song of the Year and Rock Recorded Song of the Year at the 36th GMA Dove Awards.

== Personnel ==
Building 429

- Jason Roy — lead vocals, guitar, piano
- Paul Bowden — guitars
- Scotty Beshears — bass
- Michael Anderson — drums

Production

- Jim Cooper – producer
- Blaine Barcus – A&R direction

Guest musicians

- Brent Milligan
- Jim Cooper
- David Allan
