= 54th GMA Dove Awards =

2023 US music awards ceremony

- Date: October 17, 2023
- Location: Allen Arena, Nashville, Tennessee
- Country: United States
- Hosted by: Tauren Wells

Highlights
- Most awards: Brandon Lake (4)
- Most nominations: Brandon Lake (11)
- Website: www.doveawards.com

Television/radio coverage
- Network: TBN (October 20, 2023 at 8 p.m. ET)
- Produced by: Curtis Stoneberger; Paul Wright
- Directed by: Russell E. Hall

The 54th Annual GMA Dove Awards presentation ceremony was held on Tuesday, October 17, 2023, at the Allen Arena located in Nashville, Tennessee. The ceremony recognized the accomplishments of musicians and other figures within the Christian music industry for the year 2023. The award ceremony will be aired on Trinity Broadcasting Network on Friday, October 20, 2023, at 8PM ET and 10PM ET.

The nominees were announced on Wednesday, August 9, 2023. Brandon Lake led with eleven nominations, followed by songwriter and producer Jeff Pardo who garnered eight nominations. Katy Nichole led female nominees with four nominations, while Lauren Daigle, Naomi Raine, and Tasha Cobbs Leonard followed with three nominations each.

Brandon Lake won the most awards at the ceremony, receiving four awards for Artist of the Year, Songwriter of the Year – Artist, Worship Recorded Song of the Year for "Gratitude," and Rap/Hip Hop Recorded Song of the Year for "Graves".

== Nominations announcement ==
On July 27, 2023, the Gospel Music Association announced that the nominations for the 54th GMA Dove Awards will be announced on August 9 via a YouTube livestream and the awards ceremony will be held on Tuesday, October 17, 2023, at the Allen Arena in Nashville, Tennessee. The nominees were announced by Jason Crabb, Jordan Feliz, Danny Gokey, Natalie Grant and JJ Hairston.

== Performers ==
The following musical artists performed at the 54th GMA Dove Awards:

- Blanca
- Brandon Lake
- Dylan Scott
- Elevation Worship
- Ernie Haase & Signature Sound
- for KING & COUNTRY
- GRITS
- Hulvey
- Jason Crabb
- Jekalyn Carr
- Katy Nichole
- Lauren Daigle
- Miel San Marcos
- Pastor Mike Jr.
- Phil Wickham
- Social Club Misfits
- Take 6
- Tasha Cobbs Leonard
- TobyMac
- Walker Hayes
- Zach Williams

== Presenters ==
The following people were presenters at the 54th GMA Dove Awards:

- 1K Phew
- Brian Courtney Wilson
- Brooke Ligertwood
- Chris Tomlin
- Christine D'Clario
- David Alan Leonard
- Dennis Quaid
- Jenn Johnson
- Jonathan McReynolds
- Joseph Habedank
- Julie Chen Moonves
- Lauren Daigle
- Limoblaze
- Michael W. Smith
- Naomi Raine
- Pastor Michael Todd
- Point of Grace
- Rachael Lampa
- Riley Clemmons
- Smokie Norful

== Nominees ==
This is a complete list of the nominees for the 54th GMA Dove Awards. Winners are highlighted in bold.

=== General ===
Song of the Year

- **"Goodness of God"**
  - **(Writers) Ben Fielding, Ed Cash, Jason Ingram, Jenn Johnson, Brian Johnson, (Publishers) Alletrop Music, Capitol CMG Paragon, Bethel Music Publishing, So Essential Tunes, Fellow Ships Music, SHOUT! Music Publishing Australia**
- "Build A Boat"
  - (writers) Colton Dixon, Seth Mosley, Johan Lindbrandt, Pete Becker, Mikey Gormley, (publishers) Dior and Athens Publishing, Sony Timber Publishing, Mikey Gormley Publishing Designee, Sony Music Publishing Scandinavia AB, Universal Music Publishing MGB Scandinavia AB, These Tunes Go To 11, CentricSongs
- "Fear Is Not My Future"
  - (writers) Kirk Franklin, Brandon Lake, Jonathan Jay, Hannah Shackleford, Nicole Hannel, (publishers) Brandon Lake Music, Let There Be Songs, Sounds Like Home Publishing, Maverick City Publishing, Be Essential Songs, Sound Victory Publishing, Aunt Gertrude Music Publishing LLC, Capitol CMG Paragon
- "God Really Loves Us"
  - (writers) David Crowder, Ben Glover, Jeff Sojka, Dante Bowe, (publishers) sixsteps Music, Capitol CMG Genesis, Into Music, Ariose Music, 9T One Songs, Capitol CMG Paragon, Sojka Songs, Bethel Worship Publishing, Maverick City Publishing, Heritage Worship Music Publishing
- "Gratitude"
  - (Writers) Brandon Lake, Benjamin Hastings, Dante Bowe, (Publishers) Bethel Music Publishing, Maverick City Publishing Worldwide, Heritage Worship Publishing, Bethel Worship Publishing, Maverick City Publishing, Heritage Worship Music Publishing, SHOUT! MP Brio, Capitol CMG Paragon ngs
- "In Jesus Name (God of Possible)"
  - (Writers) Ethan Hulse, Katy Nichole, David Andrew Spencer, Jeff Pardo, (Publishers) Centricity Songs, David Spencer Songs, Be Essential Songs, EGH Music Publishing LLC, Meaux Jeaux Music, Da Bears Da Bears Da Bears Music
- "Love Me Like I Am"
  - (Writers) Joel Smallbone, Luke Smallbone, Michael Pollack, Josh Kerr, (Publishers) Curb Word Music, WC Music Corp., Method To The Madness, Curb Dayspring Music, Warner-Tamerlane Publishing Corp., Kilns Music, Shaun Shankel Publishing Designee, Tunes Of Black River, Songs With A Pure Tone, What Key Do You Want It In Music, Shankel Songs, 716 Music
- "Perfectly Loved"
  - (Writers) Rachael Lampa, Andrew Ripp, Ethan Hulse, (Publishers) mamaknowsmusic, Andrew Ripp Songs, Fishbone, Ethan Hulse Music, Be Essential Songs
- "Same God"
  - (Writers) Brandon Lake, Steven Furtick, Chris Brown, Pat Barrett, (Publishers) Music By Elevation Worship Publishing, Be Essential Songs, Bethel Music Publishing, Maverick City Publishing Worldwide, Heritage Worship Publishing, Capitol CMG Genesis, House fires Sounds
- "Then Christ Came"
  - (Writers) Bart Millard, Phil Wickham, Jason Ingram, David Leonard, (Publishers) Tunes Of MercyMe, Phil Wickham Music, Simply Global Songs, Sing My Songs, J Ingram Tunes, So Essential Tunes, Integrity's Alleluia! Music, Integrated Rights

Songwriter of the Year - Artist

- **Brandon Lake**
- Chris Brown
- Dante Bowe
- Kirk Franklin
- Phil Wickham

Songwriter of the Year - Non Artist

- **Jeff Pardo**
- Ben Glover
- Ethan Hulse
- Jason Ingram
- Jonathan Jay

Artist of the Year

- **Brandon Lake**
  - **(record label) Provident Entertainment**
- CeCe Winans
  - (record label) Fair Trade Music
- For King & Country
  - (record label) Curb | Word Entertainment
- Lauren Daigle
  - (record label) Centricity Music
- Phil Wickham
  - (record label) Fair Trade Music

New Artist of the Year

- **Katy Nichole**
  - **(record label) Centricity Music**
- Ben Fuller
  - (record label) Provident Entertainment
- Hulvey
  - (record label) Reach Records
- Jon Reddick
  - (record label) Gotee Records
- Naomi Raine
  - (record label) Tribl Records

Producer of the Year

- **Jeff Pardo**
- Kenneth Leonard
- Samuel ASH
- Wayne Haun
- Ben Glover and Jeff Sojka

=== Rap/Hip Hop ===
Rap/Hip Hop Recorded Song of the Year

- **"Graves" – KB, Brandon Lake**
  - **(writers) Brandon Lake, Chris Brown, Kevin Elijah Burgess, Quinten Coblentz, Steven Furtick, Tiffany Hudson, Wesley Smith**
- "No Longer Bound" – Forrest Frank, featuring Hulvey
  - (writers) Forrest Frank, Chris Hulvey
- "Spread The Opps" – Lecrae
  - (writers) Aidan Crotinger, Alexandria Dollar, Brice Sibomana, Clayton D Rogers, Deandre Hunter, Juan Ramon Luis Melian, Kendrick Alloway, Lecrae Moore, Robert Gullatt, Lasanna Harris
- "Jireh (My Provider)" – Limoblaze, featuring Lecrae, Happi
  - (writers) Steven Furtick, Chandler Moore, Chris Brown, Lasanna Harris, Lecrae Moore, Mark Babatunde, Naomi Raine, Samuel Onwubiko
- "Spin Back!" – Scootie Wop
  - (writers) Emmanuel Louis Lofton, Crystal Waters, Neal Brian Conway

Rap/Hip Hop Album of the Year

- **Church Clothes 4 – Lecrae**
  - **(producers) Juberlee, Lasanna Harris, DrumGod, Slikk Muzik, theBeatbreaker, WEARETHEGOOD, Alex Goose, Connor Back, JuanRa, Simbo, DudeClayy, Sims Cashion, Jaden Eli, KelbyOnTheTrack, Jake Rooman, Matt Zara, Andy Mineo, Dylan Hyde, Leslie Johnson, Curious George, Joel McNeill, Carvello, Cubeatz, Vinnyforgood, Lyle Leduff, Don Cannon, NIq Maximus, Andrew Prim**
- Sunday In Lagos – Limoblaze
  - (producers) Limoblaze, Happi, Hillsplay, ItsNyceman, KDaGreat, Carvello, Dj Tag, Caleb Bryant, Darko, Tbabz, Dunnie, Tronome
- Everyone Loves A Comeback Story – Social Club Misfits
  - (producers) Grant Lapointe, Elxjh, Dave James, Carvello, Martin Santiago, Andy Mineo, Enzo Gran, Samuel ASH, Sajan Nauriyal, JuiceBangers, Ben Lopez, Isaiah LaRoi, David Frank, Josh Cumbee, Rey King, Avxp, Zach Paradis, Gabe Payne
- Tree – Steven Malcolm
  - (producers) BoogzDaBeast, FNZ, Dayme, Scootie, Ryghteous Ryan, Michael Foster, Pyro Da God, Anton Göransson, Street Symphony, Dirty Rice, Kamron Robinson, Steven Malcolm, Sango, Umoore, Cardec, Track or Die, Anthony Jones, Joseph Prielozny
- New Hollywood – WHATUPRG
  - (producers) Enzo Gran, Al Cres, Blake$ale, Mario, LNK, Hayes, Dave James, Lasanna Harris, Elxjah, WHATUPRG, Abe Parker, JuiceBangers, Taylor Hill, Killawatts, Caleb Bryant, BNYX, Carvello, Dirty Rice, Caleb Cruise, Joel McNeill, Mu Lean

=== Rock/Contemporary ===
Rock/Contemporary Recorded Song of the Year

- **"Brother Jack" – Gable Price and Friends**
  - **(writers) Gable Price, Scott Mills**
- "The Lows" – Cochren & Co.
  - (writers) Michael Cochren, Christopher Stevens
- "Goodbye Ole Me" – Consumed By Fire
  - (writers) Caleb Ward, Jordan Ward, Iveth Luna
- "Promise To Live" – Disciple
  - (writers) Josiah Prince, Andrew Stanton, Kevin Young
- "Psycho In My Head" – Skillet
  - (writers) John Cooper, Mark Holman

Rock/Contemporary Album of the Year

- **Dominion: Day of Destiny – Skillet**
  - **(producers) Kane Churko, Kevin Churko, Seth Mosley, Michael O'Connor, Bernard James Perry, Tyler Smith**
- Death Below – August Burns Red
  - (producers) Carson Slovak, Grant McFarland
- The Consequence Of Being Alive – Gable Price and Friends
  - (producers) Scott Mills, Aaron Brohman, The Foreman Brothers
- Remade In Misery – Memphis May Fire
  - (producer) Kellen McGregor
- 'The Final Battle – Stryper
  - (producers) Michael Sweet

=== Pop/Contemporary ===
Pop/Contemporary Recorded Song of the Year

- **"Brighter Days" – Blessing Offor**
  - **(writers) Sam Ellis, Blessing Offor**
- "I'm So Blessed (Best Day Remix)" – Cain
  - (writers) Matthew West, Jonathan Smith, Logan Cain, Taylor Cain Matz, Madison Cain Johnson
- "Love Me Like I Am" – For King & Country featuring Jordin Sparks
  - (writers) Joel Smallbone, Luke Smallbone, Michael Pollack, Josh Kerr
- "God Is in This Story" – Katy Nichole, Big Daddy Weave
  - (writers) Ethan Hulse, Katy Nichole, Jeff Pardo
- "Thank God I Do" – Lauren Daigle
  - (writers) Nate Ruess, Lauren Daigle, P!nk, Jeff Bhasker, Jason Ingram

Pop/Contemporary Album of the Year

- **Life After Death – TobyMac**
  - **(producers) Micah Kuiper, Toby McKeehan, Bryan Fowler, Kyle Williams, Tommee Profitt, Jon Reddick, Dave Lubben, Cole Walowac, Reske**
- My Tribe – Blessing Offor
  - (producers) Cleve Baby, Hank Bentley, Sam Ellis, Todd Clark, Maxwell Stark, Jordan Sapp, Josh Ronen, Jamie Kenney, Mike Robinson, Ryan Tutton, Dan Muckala
- Jesus Changed My Life – Katy Nichole
  - (producers) Jeff Pardo, Jonathan Smith, David Leonard, Brad King, Ben Glover, Jeff Sojka
- Always Only Jesus – MercyMe
  - (producers) Jordan Mohilowski, Brown Bannister, Tedd Tjornhom
- A Hundred Highways – Zach Williams
  - (producers) Jonathan Smith

=== Inspirational ===
Inspirational Recorded Song of the Year

- **"He's Been Faithful" – Brooklyn Tabernacle, featuring TaRanda Greene**
  - **(writer) Carol Cymbala**
- "Jesus What a Lovely Name" – Gaither Vocal Band
  - (writers) Bill Gaither, Gloria Gaither
- "Welcome" – Jim & Melissa Brady
  - (writers) Jim Brady, Michael Farren, Tony Wood
- "Christ Our Hope in Life and Death" – Keith & Kristyn Getty, Michael W. Smith
  - (writer) Matthew Boswell, Keith Getty, Jordan Kauflin, Matt Merker, Matt Papa
- "They Will Know We Are Christians By Our Love" – Michael W. Smith
  - (writer) Peter Scholtes

Inspirational Album of the Year

- **Turn Your Eyes, Vol II – Point Of Grace**
  - **(producers) Cindy Morgan, Stephen Lieweke**
- A Night of Worship – Brooklyn Tabernacle
  - (producer) Carol Cymbala, J. Daniel Smith
- Christ Our Hope in Life and Death – Keith & Kristyn Getty
  - (producer) Keith & Kristyn Getty, Ben Shive, Bryan Fowler, Nathan Nockels, Michael Farren, Fionan Debarra, David Rodgers
- Greatest Hymns, Vol III – Selah
  - (producers) Jason Kyle Saetveit

=== Southern Gospel ===
Southern Gospel Recorded Song of the Year

- **"The Keepers" – Karen Peck & New River**
  - **(writers) Karen Peck Gooch, Mitch Wong, Tony Wood**
- "I Know My Savior Cares" – Ernie Haase & Signature Sound
  - (writers) Ernie Haase, Wayne Haun, Joel Lindsey
- "There Is a Mountain" – Gaither Vocal Band
  - (writers) Marcus Hummon, Robin Boudreau
- "One Name" – Jeff & Sheri Easter, featuring The Sound
  - (writers) Jeff King, Jennifer Celeste Dawson
- "A Hundred Different Altars" – The Steeles
  - (writers) Brad Steele, Joel Lindsey, Brad Guldemon

Southern Gospel Album of the Year

- **Believe – The Hoppers**
  - **(producers) Wayne Haun, Michael Sykes**
- Think About There – Greater Vision
  - (producer) Trey Ivey
- Come On In – Guardians Quartet
  - (producers) Wayne Haun, John Darin Rowsey
- John 3:16 – The Perrys
  - (producer) Wayne Haun
- Hymns & Worship – Triumphant Quartet
  - (producers) Wayne Haun, Scott Inman, Kris Crunk

=== Bluegrass/Country/Roots ===
Bluegrass/Country/Roots Recorded Song of the Year

- **"Good Morning Mercy" – Jason Crabb, Dylan Scott**
  - **(writers) Caleb Ward, Jordan Ward, Jay DeMarcus, Jason Crabb**
- "Jordan" – Darin & Brooke Aldridge, featuring Ricky Skaggs, Mo Pitney, Mark Fain
  - (writer) Fred Rich
- "Matchless" – Tiffany Coburn, featuring Point of Grace
  - (writers) Val Dacus, Jeff Bumgardner
- "Way of the Triune God (Hallelujah Version)" – Tyler Childers
  - (writer) Tyler Childers
- "Jesus' Fault" – Zach Williams, featuring Walker Hayes
  - (writers) Michael Farren, Walker Hayes

Bluegrass/Country/Roots Album of the Year

- **Light in the Canyon – Sandra McCracken**
  - **(producer) Sandra McCracken, Seth Talley**
- The Gospel Sessions, Vol I – Authentic Unlimited
  - (producers) Authentic Unlimited
- Treasure – Jeff & Sheri Easter
  - (producers) Jeff & Sheri Easter, Greg Cole
- Lost and Found – Southbound
  - (producers) Barry Weeks, Clint Brown
- Can I Take My Hounds to Heaven? – Tyler Childers
  - (producers) Tyler Childers, The Food Stamps

=== Contemporary Gospel ===
Contemporary Gospel Recorded Song of the Year

- **"Your World" – Jonathan McReynolds**
  - **(writers) Dee Wilson, Jonathan McReynolds**
- "New Day" – Blanca, featuring Jekalyn Carr
  - (writers) Dwan Hill, Taylor Hill, Jekalyn Carr, Anton Goransson, Isabella Sjostrand, Blanca Reyes
- "Miracles" – Kierra Sheard, featuring Pastor Mike Jr.
  - (writer) J. Drew Sheard II, Kierra Sheard, Marcus Johnson
- "Bless Me" – Maverick City Music, Kirk Franklin
  - (writers) Kirk Franklin
- "Get Up" – Tye Tribbett
  - (writers) Tyrone Tribbett II, Brandon Jones, Thaddaeus T. Tribbett, Christopher Michael Stevens

Contemporary Gospel Album of the Year

- **Kingdom Book One (Deluxe) – Maverick City Music, Kirk Franklin**
  - **(producers) Tony Brown, Jonathan Jay, Kirk Franklin, Chandler Moore, Norman Gyamfi, Maxwell Stark, Harold Brown, Demetrius Smith, Ron Hill**
- My Truth – Jonathan McReynolds
  - (producers) Jonathan McReynolds, Gina Miller, Walter Thomas, Darryl Howell, Rogest Carstarphen, Camper, Byron Thomas, Dreek
- Impossible – Pastor Mike Jr.
  - (producers) Pastor Mike Jr, David Outing II, Jevon Hill, Stanley Green, Phil Mango, Jeremy James, Rod Turner, Dustin Slater, John Smith, Quentin Dennard, Alexander Brown, Israil Ali, Bartholomew Orr, Jason Clayborn, Snipe Young, 1KPhew, Adia Andrews, Amanda Gentry, Terrell Pettus, Curtiss Glenn, The Colleagues
- Overcomer (Deluxe) – Tamela Mann
  - (producers) David Mann Sr., Tamela Mann, La'Tia Mann, Justin Pearson, Dontaniel Kimbrough, Phillip Bryant, Jevon Hill, Kirk Franklin, Travis Greene, Todd Dulaney, Shaun Martin, Slikk Muzik, Stanley Green, Daniel Bryant
- All Things New – Tye Tribbett
  - (producers) Tye Tribbett, Joseph Bethea, Derrick Guinyard, Shante Tribbett, Dave Outing, Jevon Hill, Brian Miller

=== Traditional Gospel ===
Traditional Gospel Recorded Song of the Year

- **"It Is Well" – Tasha Cobbs Leonard**
  - **(writers) Tasha Cobbs Leonard, Kenneth Leonard, Ricky Dillard, Zeke Listenbee**
- "Alright" – Melvin Crispell III
  - (writers) Reginald K. Scriven II, Solomon Headen, TK Morrison
- "Finished (Live)" – Tamela Mann
  - (writers) Travis Greene, Tamela Mann
- "I Need You" – The Walls Group
  - (writers) Warryn Campbell, Eric Dawkins, Darrel Walls, Ahjah Walls
- "See The Goodness" – VaShawn Mitchell, featuring Donnie McClurkin
  - (writers) VaShawn Mitchell

Traditional Gospel Album of the Year

- **Transitions (Live) – Brian Courtney Wilson**
  - **(producers) Dana T. Sorey, Brian Courtney Wilson**
- Nothing Else Matters – Brent Jones
  - (producers) Brent Jones, Professor James Roberson, Eddie Brown
- Believe Again – JJ Hairston
  - (producers) JJ Hairston, Ryland Anderson, Ronnie Collins
- I Go To The Rock – Whitney Houston
  - (producers) Whitney Houston, Mervyn Warren, Bebe Winans, Steve Abdul Kahn Brown, Freaky Rob, D. Phelps, Ken Ehrlich, Emanuel Kiriakou, C. Stewart, Harvey Mason Jr., The Underdogs
- Worship & Justice – William Murphy
  - (producers) Kenneth Leonard

=== Gospel Worship ===
Gospel Worship Recorded Song of the Year

- **"Impossible" – Pastor Mike Jr., featuring James Fortune**
  - **(writers) James Fortune, Michael McClure Jr.**
- "One Name (Jesus) [Live]" – Naomi Raine
  - (writers) G. Morris Coleman, Naomi Raine
- "I Still Have You" – Smokie Norful
  - (writers) Smokie Norful, Tre' Norful, SNW
- "The Moment (Live)" – Tasha Cobbs Leonard
  - (writers) Deon Kipping, Tasha Cobbs Leonard
- "You've Been Good To Me" – Zacardi Cortez
  - (writer) Zacardi Cortez, Tyrone Belle, Morgan Turner, Marcus Calyen, Alonzo J. Keeton, Tyrell Belle, Kerry Douglas

Gospel Worship Album of the Year

- **Hymns (Live) – Tasha Cobbs Leonard**
  - **(producers) Kenneth Leonard, Jevon Hill, Leonard Ray Jarman**
- Tent Revival – Forward City, Travis Greene
  - (producers) Travis Greene, Matthew Edwards, Brunes Charles, Reggie Rhett
- Closer Than You Think – Jonathan Traylor
  - (producers) Lightmuzik, Jeff Pardo, Jordan Sapp
- Encounter – Todd Galberth
  - (producers) Todd Galberth, Dontavious Ladson, Jevon Hill
- Imprint – Zacardi Cortez
  - (producers) Morgan Turner, AyRon Lewis, Lucius B. Hoskins, Nicholas Humes

=== Spanish Language ===
Spanish Language Recorded Song of the Year

- **"Coritos (En Vivo)" – Miel San Marcos, Daniel Calveti, Marcos Witt, Ingrid Rosario**
  - **(writers) Manuel Jose Alonso, Jose Pagan Lopez, Miguel Cassina, Mario A. Menendez, Billy Bunster**
- "Guarda Tu Corazon" – Alex Zurdo
  - (writer) Alexis Velez
- "So Good (Cuan Bueno)" – Doe, featuring Lilly Goodman
  - (writers) Chuck Butler, Dominique Jones, Ethan Hulse
- "Nubes" – Indiomar, featuring Blanca
  - (writer) David Omar Rivera Rodriguez
- "Suelto" – Sarai Rivera
  - (writer) Sarai Rivera

Spanish Language Album of the Year

- **Tu Reino Esta Aqui – Generacion 12**
  - **(producers) Lorena Castellanos, Johan Manjarres, Anthony Catacoli, Jairo Zuluaga, Andres Mazuera**
- Grande y Fiel (En Vivo) – Gateway Worship Español
  - (producers) Kyle Lee, Danny Pena
- Lo Que Vemos – Marcos Vidal
  - (producers) Mike Rodriguez, Eliseo Tapia
- Rompiendo – Redimi2
  - (producers) Niko Eme, Brayan Booz, Barajas, Kanelo Pro, Music Mind, Nath, Cardec Drums, Chucky
- X Siempre – Un Corazon
  - (producer) Steven Richards

=== Worship ===
Worship Recorded Song of the Year

- **"Gratitude (Radio Version)" – Brandon Lake**
  - **(writers) Brandon Lake, Benjamin Hastings, Dante Bowe**
- "Honey in the Rock (Live)" – Brooke Ligertwood, Brandon Lake
  - (writers) Brooke Ligertwood, Brandon Lake, Mitch Wong
- "Holy Forever" – Chris Tomlin
  - (writers) Chris Tomlin, Phil Wickham, Jason Ingram, Jenn Johnson, Brian Johnson
- "Fear Is Not My Future (Radio Version)" – Maverick City Music, featuring Brandon Lake, Chandler Moore
  - (writers) Kirk Franklin, Brandon Lake, Jonathan Jay, Hannah Shackelford, Nicole Hannel
- "This Is Our God" – Phil Wickham
  - (writers) Brandon Lake, Phil Wickham, Steven Furtick, Pat Barrett

Worship Album of the Year

- **Lion: Live from the Loft – Elevation Worship**
  - **(producers) Steven Furtick, Chris Brown, Scott Gardner**
- Come Up Here – Bethel Music
  - (producers) Chris Greely, Bobby Strand
- Honest Offering (Live) – Cain
  - (producers) Jonathan Smith, David Leonard, Brad King
- God Is Good! (Live) – Cody Carnes
  - (producers) Aaron Robertson, Austin Davis, Jeff Pardo, Hank Bentley
- Lamb of God – Matt Redman
  - (producers) Steve Marcia, Connor Shambrook, Leonard Ray Jarman, Quintin Trotter

=== Other categories ===
Children's Recorded Song Of The Year

- **"Sounding Joy" – Ellie Holcomb**
  - **(writers) Ellie Holcomb, Nathan Dugger**
- "Danzo En El Río" – Miel San Marcos Kids
  - (writer) Josué Morales, Luis Morales Jr.
- "Great Are You Lord" – Shout Praises Kids
  - (writers) Leslie Jordan, David Leonard, Jason Ingram
- "I Am Not My Own" – The Getty Girls
  - (writers) Skye Peterson, Ben Shive, Bryan Fowler, Thomas Anderson
- "The Fruit of the Spirit" – Worship Together Kids
  - (writers) John Roberts, Terryl Padilla

Christmas / Special Event Album of the Year

- **Christmas at Home – Michael W. Smith**
  - **(producers) Michael W. Smith, Mark Campbell**
- The Manger – Anne Wilson
  - (producer) Jeff Pardo, Jonathan Smith
- Milk & Cookies: A Merry Crowder Christmas – Crowder
  - (producers) Ben Glover, Jeff Sojka, Tommee Profitt
- Sing: Christmas Songs – Ellie Holcomb
  - (producer) Nathan Dugger, Brown Bannister
- This Is Christmas – Tasha Layton
  - (producer) Keith Everette Smith

Musical/Choral Collection of the Year

- **A Night of Worship with The Brooklyn Tabernacle Choir**
  - **(arranger) Carol Cymbala, (orchestrators) J. Daniel Smith, Chris McDonald, Jim Hammerly, Bradley Knight**
- Blessed Assurance
  - (arranger) Phil Nitz
- Glorious Impossible
  - (creators) Sue C. Smith, Lee Black, Russell Mauldin, Johnathan Crumpton, (arranger/ orchestrator) Russell Mauldin
- Tribute: Songs of Geron Davis
  - (arranger and orchestrator) Bradley Knight
- Wonderful
  - (creator/arranger) John Bolin, (orchestrator) Cliff Duren

Recorded Music Packaging of the Year

- **The Stories I Tell Myself – Matt Maher**
  - **(art directors/graphic designer) Tony Matula, Laura Matula, Tim Parker, (photographers) Tony Matula, Laura Matula**
- As I Am – 1K Phew
  - (art director) Kevin Hackett
- I Can't Find The Edges of You – Citizens
  - (art directors) Zach Bolen, Matthew Warren, (graphic designer/photographer) Matthew Warren
- Church Girls Love R&B – Jor'Dan Armstrong
  - (art director) Arvonecia Armstrong, (photographer) Tatyanna Chamere, (graphic designer) Kevin Hackett
- Taya – Taya
  - (art director) Jay Argaet, (graphic designers) Caleb Nietschke, Luke Hastings, (photographer) Anabel Litchfield

=== Videos and films ===
Short Form Video of the Year (Concept)

- **"Thank God I Do" – Lauren Daigle**
  - **(director) Caleb Mallery, (producer) Wandering Cameras**
- "Do You Hear What I Hear?" – For King & Country
  - (director) Andrew Cherry, (producer) Mitchell Schleper
- "Spread The Opps" – Lecrae
  - (director) Ray Neutron, (producer) Jessica Zerby
- "Cornerstone" – TobyMac, featuring Zach Williams
  - (director) Eric Welch, (producer) Scott McDaniel
- "Heart of God" – Zach Williams
  - (director) Sean Hagwell, (producer) Kirsten Hagwell

Short Form Video of the Year (Performance)

- **"The Goodness" – TobyMac, Blessing Offor**
  - **(director) Eric Welch, (producer) Steve Lamar, Scott McDaniel**
- "Plans" – David Leonard
  - (director) Elliott Eicheldinger
- "Holy Forever" – Jenn Johnson
  - (director/producer) Luke Manwaring
- "Where The Glory Is" – Josh Baldwin
  - (director/producer) Luke Manwaring
- "Graves" – KB, Brandon Lake
  - (director) Juan Garcia, (producer) Jayson Palacio

Long Form Video of the Year

- **Come Up Here – Bethel Music**
  - **(director) Luke Manwaring, (producer) Caleb Marmolejo**
- God Is Good! (Live) – Cody Carnes
  - (director) Mait Hudson, (producer) Jacob Boyles
- Grande y Fiel – Gateway Worship Español
  - (director/producer) Paul Trimble
- The Way – Kathie Lee Gifford
  - (producer) Kathie Lee Gifford
- I've Witnessed It (Live) – Passion
  - (director) Brian Zimmerman, (producers) Passion, Louie Giglio, Shelley Giglio, Rachel Baldwin

Feature Film of the Year

- **Jesus Revolution**
  - **(directors) Jon Erwin, Brent McCorkle**
- Big George Foreman
  - (director) George Tillman Jr., (producer) David Zelon
- Family Camp
  - (director) Brian Cates, (producers) Trey Reynolds, Darren Moorman, Jay However, Justin Tolley
- I Heard the Bells
  - (director/producer) Joshua Enck
- Remember Me: The Mahalia Jackson Story
  - (director) Denise Dowse, (producers) Ericka Nicole Malone, Phillip E. Robinson, Vince Allen

Television Series of the Year

- **The Chosen**
  - **(director) Dallas Jenkins, (producers) Dallas Jenkins, Chad Gundersen, Chris Juen**
- Grace Notes
  - (director) Russ Kendall, (producers) Russ Kendall, Chantelle Squires, Jenny Latchman-Atkins
- Journey Of Faith
  - (director) Corbin Bernsen, (producers) Corbin Bernsen, Chris Aronoff
- The Wingfeather Saga
  - (directors) John Sanford, Bill Breneisen, (producer) J. Chris Wall
- When Calls the Heart
  - (directors) Peter DeLuise, Siobhan Devine, Neill Fearnley, (producers) Brian Bird, Brad Krevoy, John Tinker
