= Who I Am (EP) =

Who I Am EP

EP by Blanca
- Released: January 13, 2015
- Genres: CCM; electropop
- Length: 17:15
- Label: Word Records

Blanca chronology
Who I Am EP (2015)	Blanca (2015)

Who I Am is the first EP from Blanca. Word Records released the project on January 13, 2015.

== Reception ==
Professional ratings
Review scores
Source	Rating
365 Days of Inspiring Media	3/5 stars
CCM Magazine	4/5 stars
New Release Tuesday	4/5 stars

Specifying in a four star out of five review by CCM Magazine, Andy Argyrakis observed, "Blanca makes a series of bold solo statements on this beat-driven diary". In agreement with it being considered a four star album from New Release Tuesday, Caitlin Lassiter recognizes, "it's obvious that Blanca is a seasoned artist." Micah Garnett, awarding the album three stars for 365 Days of Inspiring Media, writes, "Who I Am is an EP I might hand to my little sister, but I wouldn’t listen to myself."

== Tracks ==
No.	Title	Length
1.	"Who I Am"	3:12
2.	"Sunshine"	3:38
3.	"Echo"	3:38
4.	"Not Backing Down" (featuring Tedashii)	3:18
5.	"Different Drum"	3:29
Total length:		17:15

== Charts ==
Chart (2015)	Peak position
US Top Christian Albums (Billboard)	19
US Heatseekers Albums (Billboard)	12
