= Kingdom Book One =

2022 live album by Maverick City Music and Kirk Franklin

Live album by Maverick City Music and Kirk Franklin
- Released: June 17, 2022
- Recorded: March 2022
- Venue: Everglades Correctional Institution, Miami-Dade, Florida, US
- Genre: Contemporary worship; contemporary gospel
- Length: 93:17
- Label: Tribl; Fo Yo Soul; RCA Inspiration
- Producer: Tony Brown; Jonathan Jay; Kirk Franklin; Chandler Moore; Norman Gyamfi

Maverick City Music chronology
Simple Adoración (2022)	Kingdom Book One (2022)

Kirk Franklin chronology
Long Live Love (2019)	Kingdom Book One (2022)	Father's Day (2023)

Kingdom Book One is a collaborative live album by Maverick City Music and Kirk Franklin. The album was released on June 17, 2022, via Tribl Records, Fo Yo Soul Entertainment and RCA Inspiration. The album features appearances by Naomi Raine, Chandler Moore, Brandon Lake, Lizzie Morgan, Dante Bowe, Maryanne J. George, and Ryan Ofei. The album serves to raise awareness on the injustice of mass incarceration. The deluxe edition of the album was released on July 22, 2022.

The album was supported by the release of "Kingdom" and "Bless Me" as promotional singles. "Kingdom" peaked at number 17 on the US Hot Christian Songs chart, and number six on the Hot Gospel Songs chart. "Bless Me" peaked at number 19 on the Hot Christian Songs chart, and number eight on the Hot Gospel Songs chart. To promote the album, Maverick City Music and Kirk Franklin will embark on the Kingdom Tour, which is set to span cities across the United States.

Kingdom Book One debuted at number two on Billboard's Top Christian Albums chart and the Top Gospel Albums chart in the United States, and at number five on the Official Charts' Official Christian & Gospel Albums Chart in the United Kingdom. The album received a nomination for the Grammy Award for Best Gospel Album at the 2023 Grammy Awards.

== Background ==
In March 2022, Maverick City Music and Kirk Franklin announced that they will be embarking on the Kingdom Tour, with a collaboration album titled Kingdom initially set to be released by the artists following the conclusion of the tour. On May 20, 2022, Maverick City Music and Kirk Franklin announced that they will release a collaborative album titled Kingdom Book One on June 17, 2022.

The artists recorded the album at the Everglades Correctional Institution in Miami-Dade, Florida, with 1,300 inmates participating in the recording of the album. The recording serves to spotlight the injustices around mass incarceration. Maverick City Music founder Tony Brown asserted that this is an issue which primarily affects black and brown people and that issues affecting these communities would take precedence in their music as the group matures in their artistry. Brown shared that he hoped the album would encourage people to proactively address it in ways such as donating to organizations fighting mass incarceration and volunteering in adversely affected communities.

On July 18, 2022, Maverick City Music and Kirk Franklin announced that they will be releasing the deluxe edition of Kingdom Book One on July 22. The deluxe edition of the album features nine new songs that were recorded while they were on tour.

== Release and promotion ==
=== Promotional singles ===
On May 20, 2022, Maverick City Music and Kirk Franklin released "Kingdom" featuring Naomi Raine and Chandler Moore as the first promotional single from the album, accompanied with its music video, while concurrently availing the album for digital pre-order. "Kingdom" peaked at number 17 on the US Hot Christian Songs chart, and number six on the Hot Gospel Songs chart.

On June 3, 2022, "Bless Me" was released by Maverick City Music and Kirk Franklin as the second promotional single from the album, accompanied with its music video. "Bless Me" peaked at number 19 on the Hot Christian Songs chart, and number eight on the Hot Gospel Songs chart.

On July 15, 2022, Maverick City Music and Kirk Franklin released "Exodus" and "The Name" featuring Brandon Lake and Maryanne J. George as promotional singles from Kingdom Book One (Deluxe), concurrently availing the album for digital pre-order.

=== Other songs ===
On June 17, 2022, Maverick City Music and Kirk Franklin released the music video of "Fear Is Not My Future" featuring Brandon Lake and Chandler Moore, filmed at Mother Emmanuel AME Church in Charleston, South Carolina. The music video's release is in remembrance of the Charleston church shooting which occurred at the church seven years prior on June 17, 2015. "Fear Is Not My Future" peaked at number 26 on the Hot Christian Songs chart, and number 11 on the Hot Gospel Songs chart.

On June 29, 2022, Maverick City Music and Kirk Franklin released the music video of "The One You Love" featuring Brandon Lake, Dante Bowe and Chandler Moore, filmed at Everglades Correctional Institution in Miami-Dade, Florida.

On July 12, 2022, Maverick City Music and Kirk Franklin released the music video of "Why We Sing" featuring Brandon Lake, filmed at Everglades Correctional Institution in Miami-Dade, Florida.

=== Performances ===
On June 20, 2022, Maverick City Music and Kirk Franklin performed "Kingdom" on The View in commemoration of Juneteenth. The performance, which featured Naomi Raine, Chandler Moore, and Brandon Lake, was aired on ABC. On June 23, 2022, Maverick City Music and Kirk Franklin performed "Kingdom" on their Tiny Desk Concert performance as part of NPR Music's commemoration of Black Music Month. On June 26, 2022, Maverick City Music and Kirk Franklin did a live televised performance of "Kingdom" and "Melodies From Heaven" at the 2022 BET Awards. On July 6, 2022, Maverick City Music and Kirk Franklin performed "Kingdom" on NBC's Today Show. On July 15, 2022, Maverick City Music and Kirk Franklin performed "Kingdom" on Fox & Friends as part of the All-American Summer Concert Series at Fox Square. On August 30, 2022, Maverick City Music and Kirk Franklin released a live performance video of "Bless Me" filmed at Vevo Studio through Kirk Franklin's YouTube channel.

== Touring ==
On March 11, 2022, Maverick City Music and Kirk Franklin announced that they will embark on the Kingdom Tour. The tour featured Jonathan McReynolds and Housefires accompanying them as special guests. The tour commenced at FTX Arena in Miami on June 1, 2022, and concluded at Hollywood Casino Amphitheatre in Tinley Park, Illinois on August 7, 2022. The final four performances on the tour were called "Kingdom Nights" and featured Tamela Mann as a special guest.

On September 1, 2022, Maverick City Music and Kirk Franklin announced a 14-date extension of the Kingdom Tour. The new tour extension began on November 3, 2022, at the Barclays Center in New York City, and concluded on November 22, 2022, at the Moody Center in Austin, Texas.

== Reception ==
=== Critical response ===
Professional ratings
Review scores
Source	Rating
365 Days of Inspiring Media	5/5
The Journal of Gospel Music	5/5 stars

In a positive review for the Journal of Gospel Music, Robert Marovich said "The act of remembrance implicit in singing Kirk Franklin catalog songs is the troupe's way of reminding listeners that the inmates, like the songs, must not be forgotten." Joshua Andre in his 365 Days of Inspiring Media review opined that "as a whole, this is a near-flawless, powerful, and well-constructed album, with the concept of going into the prisons and recording live in the prisons, being inspiring, impacting, confronting, and encouraging. Kingdom Book One isn't a sanitised album. But it doesn't have to be. Maverick City Music's goal is to win souls for Jesus- and I think they might have done that with this release. A stellar album and a project that will be timeless, Kirk needs to be congratulated, as do everyone else involved." Reviewing for Others Magazine, Jared Proellocks wrote: "This is not necessarily an album of songs to be replicated in a congregational worship setting but a vulnerable declaration of praise and love to God."

=== Accolades ===
Awards
Year	Organization	Award	Result	Ref
2023	Grammy Awards	Best Gospel Album	Won	
2023	NAACP Image Awards	Outstanding Gospel/Christian Album	Won	
2023	GMA Dove Awards	Contemporary Gospel Album of the Year	Won	

== Commercial performance ==
Kingdom Book One debuted at number 151 on the Billboard 200, including number 2 on the Top Christian Albums and Top Gospel Albums charts with 8,000 album-equivalent units.

In the UK, the album debuted on the OCC's Official Christian & Gospel Albums Chart at number 5.

== Track listing ==
Disc 1
No.	Title	Writer(s)	Length
1.	"Kingdom" (featuring Naomi Raine and Chandler Moore)	Kirk Franklin; Chandler Moore; Jonathan Jay; Jacob Poole	9:26
2.	"Fear Is Not My Future" (featuring Brandon Lake and Chandler Moore)	Brandon Lake; Jay; Hannah Shackelford; Nicole Hannel	10:25
3.	"Bless Me"	Franklin	4:32
4.	"Jealous" (featuring Chandler Moore and Lizzie Morgan)	Franklin; Moore; Charles Butler	14:51
5.	"Talkin Bout (Love)" (featuring Chandler Moore and Lizzie Morgan)	Franklin; Moore	6:03
6.	"The One You Love" (featuring Brandon Lake, Dante Bowe, Chandler Moore)	Chris Brown; Steven Furtick; Jason Ingram; Phil Wickham	10:47

Disc 2
No.	Title	Writer(s)	Length
1.	"My Life Is in Your Hands" (featuring Chandler Moore)	Franklin	7:01
2.	"Melodies From Heaven" (featuring Chandler Moore and Maryanne J. George)	Franklin	3:22
3.	"I Smile" (featuring Lizzie Morgan)	Franklin; Fred Tackett; Jimmy Jam & Terry Lewis	3:30
4.	"Why We Sing" (featuring Brandon Lake)	Franklin	3:45
5.	"Take Me Back" (featuring Dante Bowe, Chandler Moore, Ryan Ofei)	Bowe; Emily Hearn Harrison; Adaeze Noelle Azubuike; Michael Barkulis	19:34
Total length:			93:17

Kingdom Book One — Apple Music bonus video content
No.	Title	Length
12.	"Kingdom" (featuring Naomi Raine and Chandler Moore)	9:26
13.	"Fear Is Not My Future" (featuring Brandon Lake and Chandler Moore)	17:40
14.	"Bless Me"	4:34
15.	"Jealous" (featuring Chandler Moore and Lizzie Morgan)	14:52
16.	"Talkin Bout (Love)" (featuring Chandler Moore and Lizzie Morgan)	6:06
17.	"The One You Love" (featuring Brandon Lake, Dante Bowe, Chandler Moore)	10:45
18.	"My Life Is in Your Hands" (featuring Chandler Moore)	7:00
19.	"Melodies From Heaven" (featuring Chandler Moore and Maryanne J. George)	3:20
20.	"I Smile" (featuring Lizzie Morgan)	3:23
21.	"Why We Sing" (featuring Brandon Lake)	3:41
22.	"Take Me Back" (featuring Dante Bowe, Chandler Moore, Ryan Ofei)	19:31

Kingdom Book One (Deluxe)
No.	Title	Writer(s)	Length
1.	"Kingdom Book One Interlude"	Kirk Franklin	1:00
2.	"Kingdom" (featuring Naomi Raine and Chandler Moore)		9:26
3.	"Fear Is Not My Future" (featuring Brandon Lake and Chandler Moore)		10:25
4.	"Bless Me"		4:32
5.	"Jealous" (featuring Chandler Moore and Lizzie Morgan)		14:51
6.	"Talkin Bout (Love)" (featuring Chandler Moore and Lizzie Morgan)		6:03
7.	"The One You Love" (featuring Brandon Lake, Dante Bowe, Chandler Moore)		10:47
8.	"My Life Is in Your Hands" (featuring Chandler Moore)		7:01
9.	"Melodies From Heaven" (featuring Chandler Moore and Maryanne J. George)		3:22
10.	"I Smile" (featuring Lizzie Morgan)		3:30
11.	"Why We Sing" (featuring Brandon Lake)		3:45
12.	"Take Me Back" (featuring Dante Bowe, Chandler Moore, Ryan Ofei)		19:34
13.	"Kingdom Book Two Interlude"	Franklin	0:59
14.	"Exodus"	Kanye West; Franklin	3:01
15.	"I Am"	Franklin	2:17
16.	"The Name" (featuring Brandon Lake and Maryanne J. George)	Franklin	5:08
17.	"Hold Tight" (featuring Ryan Ellis & Lizzie Morgan)	Harold Brown; Isaiah Schuman; Ryan Ellis	3:51
18.	"Conclusions"	Franklin	4:33
19.	"God's Got Us" (featuring Chandler Moore)	Franklin	4:29
20.	"I Found You" (featuring Chandler Moore and Aaron Moses)	Aaron Moses; Dante Bowe; Judah Smith; Taylor Hill	3:34
21.	"Under the Blood" (featuring Brandon Lake and Chandler Moore)	Brandon Lake; Chandler Moore; Jonathan Jay; Kirk Franklin	5:14
22.	"Can't Nobody" (featuring Ryan Ofei and Maryanne J. George)	Mariah Adigun; Nate Diaz; Ryan Ofei	5:12
Total length:			132:35

== Charts ==
=== Weekly charts ===
Weekly chart performance for Kingdom Book One
Chart (2022)	Peak position
UK Christian & Gospel Albums (OCC)	5
US Billboard 200	151
US Top Christian Albums (Billboard)	2
US Top Gospel Albums (Billboard)	2

=== Year-end charts ===
Year-end chart performance for Kingdom Book One
Chart (2022)	Position
US Christian Albums (Billboard)	40
US Gospel Albums (Billboard)	6
Chart (2023)	Position
US Christian Albums (Billboard)	27
US Gospel Albums (Billboard)	4
Chart (2025)	Position
US Gospel Albums (Billboard)	11

== Release history ==
Release history and formats for Kingdom Book One
Region	Date	Version	Format(s)	Label(s)	Ref.
Various	June 17, 2022	Standard	Digital download; streaming	Tribl Records; Fo Yo Soul Entertainment; RCA Inspiration	
Various	July 1, 2022	Standard	CD	Provident Label Group	
Various	July 22, 2022	Deluxe	Digital download; streaming	Tribl Records; Fo Yo Soul Entertainment; RCA Inspiration	
