= Kingdom (Maverick City Music and Kirk Franklin song) =

2022 song by Maverick City Music and Kirk Franklin

Promotional single by Maverick City Music and Kirk Franklin featuring Naomi Raine and Chandler Moore

from the album Kingdom Book One
- Released: May 20, 2022
- Recorded: March 2022
- Venue: Everglades Correctional Institution, Miami-Dade, Florida, US
- Genre: Contemporary worship music; contemporary gospel
- Length: 9:25
- Label: Tribl; Fo Yo Soul; RCA Inspiration
- Songwriters: Kirk Franklin; Chandler Moore; Jonathan Jay; Jacob Poole

Music video
- "Kingdom" on YouTube

"Kingdom" is a song performed by American contemporary worship collective Maverick City Music and American gospel musician Kirk Franklin, which features vocals from Naomi Raine and Chandler Moore. The song was released on May 20, 2022, as a promotional single from their collaborative live album, Kingdom Book One (2022). The song was written by Chandler Moore, Jacob Poole, Jonathan Jay, and Kirk Franklin.

"Kingdom" debuted at number 17 on the US Hot Christian Songs chart, and at number six on the Hot Gospel Songs chart. The song received the Grammy Award for Best Gospel Performance/Song at the 2023 Grammy Awards.

== Background ==
On May 13, 2022, MultiTracks revealed that Maverick City Music and Kirk Franklin have released the resources of the song "Kingdom" from their upcoming collaborative album a week early ahead of the song's release. "Kingdom" was subsequently released on May 20, 2022, accompanied with its music video.

== Composition ==
"Kingdom" is composed in the key of F with a tempo of 84 beats per minute and a musical time signature of 4/4.

== Awards and nominations ==
Awards
Year	Organization	Award	Result	Ref
2023	Grammy Awards	Best Gospel Performance/Song	Won	

== Commercial performance ==
"Kingdom" debuted at number 19 on the US Hot Christian Songs chart, and number seven on the Hot Gospel Songs chart dated June 4, 2022.

== Music video ==
On May 20, 2022, Tribl Records released the official music video of "Kingdom" by Maverick City Music and Kirk Franklin, featuring Naomi Raine and Chandler Moore, via YouTube. The video shows Kirk Franklin, Naomi Raine and Chandler Moore performing the song alongside inmates at the Everglades Correctional Institution in Miami-Dade, Florida.

== Performances ==
On June 20, 2022, Maverick City Music and Kirk Franklin performed "Kingdom" on The View in commemoration of Juneteenth. The performance, which featured Naomi Raine, Chandler Moore, and Brandon Lake, was aired on ABC. On June 23, 2022, Maverick City Music and Kirk Franklin performed "Kingdom" on their Tiny Desk Concert performance as part of NPR Music's commemoration of Black Music Month. On June 26, 2022, Maverick City Music and Kirk Franklin did a live televised performance of "Kingdom" and "Melodies from Heaven" at the 2022 BET Awards. On July 6, 2022, Maverick City Music and Kirk Franklin performed "Kingdom" on NBC's Today Show. On July 15, 2022, Maverick City Music and Kirk Franklin performed "Kingdom" on Fox & Friends as part of the All-American Summer Concert Series at Fox Square.

== Charts ==
=== Weekly charts ===
Weekly chart performance for "Kingdom"
Chart (2022)	Peak position
US Hot Christian Songs (Billboard)	17
US Gospel Songs (Billboard)	6
US Gospel Airplay (Billboard)	1

=== Year-end charts ===
Year-end chart performance for "Kingdom"
Chart (2022)	Position
US Christian Songs (Billboard)	52
US Gospel Songs (Billboard)	12
US Gospel Airplay (Billboard)	26
Chart (2023)	Position
US Gospel Songs (Billboard)	7
US Gospel Airplay (Billboard)	47

== Release history ==
Release history for "Kingdom"
Region	Date	Format	Label	Ref.
Various	May 20, 2022	Digital download; streaming; (promotional release)	Tribl Records; Fo Yo Soul Entertainment; RCA Inspiration	
