= The Healing (song) =

2022 single by Blanca & Dante Bowe

Single by Blanca and Dante Bowe

from the album The Heartbreak and the Healing
- Released: March 4, 2022
- Genre: CCM
- Length: 3:49
- Label: Word Entertainment
- Songwriter(s): Dante Bowe; Anton Göransson; Blanca Reyes; Isabella Sjöstrand
- Producer(s): Anton Göransson

Blanca singles chronology
"Even At My Worst" (2021)	"The Healing" (2022)	"New Day" (2022)

Dante Bowe singles chronology
"Cold Outside" (2022)	"The Healing" (2022)	"Nail Scarred Hands" (2022)

Music videos
- "The Healing" on YouTube
- "The Healing" (Lyrics) on YouTube

"The Healing" is a song performed by American contemporary Christian music singers Blanca and Dante Bowe. The song was released on March 4, 2022, as the second single from Blanca's third studio album, The Heartbreak and the Healing (2022). "The Healing" impacted Christian radio in the United States on April 1, 2022. The song was written by Anton Göransson, Blanca Reyes, Dante Bowe, and Isabella Sjosstrand. Anton Göransson produced the song.

"The Healing" peaked at No. 9 on the US Hot Christian Songs chart.

== Background ==
On March 4, 2022, Blanca and Dante Bowe released "The Healing" along with the music video for the song. The song also exclusively premiered on K-Love radio that same day. Blanca described the collaboration with Dante Bowe as a "full circle moment" for her, as Bowe's music as well as Maverick City's had walked her through the past season of her life. The song was inspired by Blanca's personal healing from an illness, the subsequent death of her parents and a divorce.

"The Healing" impacted Christian radio in the United States on April 1, 2022.

== Composition ==
"The Healing" is composed in the key of A♭ with a tempo of 90 beats per minute and a musical time signature of 4/4.

== Accolades ==
Year-end lists
Publication	Accolade	Ref.
NewReleaseToday	Best of 2022: Top 10 Songs of the Year	

== Commercial performance ==
"The Healing" debuted at No. 28 on the US Christian Airplay chart dated March 12, 2022, being the highest ranking debut that week.

"The Healing" made its debut at No. 39 on the US Hot Christian Songs chart dated March 19, 2022. The song reached No. 10 on the Hot Christian Songs chart dated August 13, 2022, becoming the second top-ten hit single for both Blanca and Dante Bowe.

== Music videos ==
The official music video for "The Healing" premiered on Blanca's YouTube channel on March 4, 2022. The official lyric video of the song was published by Blanca on YouTube on March 9, 2022.

== Charts ==
=== Weekly charts ===
Weekly chart performance for "The Healing"
Chart (2022)	Peak position
New Zealand Hot Singles (RMNZ)	24
US Christian Songs (Billboard)	9
US Christian Airplay (Billboard)	8
US Christian AC (Billboard)	12

=== Year-end charts ===
Year-end chart performance for "The Healing"
Chart (2022)	Position
US Christian Songs (Billboard)	39
US Christian Airplay (Billboard)	33
US Christian AC (Billboard)	36

== Release history ==
Release dates and formats for "The Healing"
Region	Date	Format	Label	Ref.
Various	March 4, 2022	Digital download; streaming	Word Entertainment	
United States	April 1, 2022	Christian radio	Word Entertainment	
