= Blanca (album) =

Studio album by Blanca
- Released: May 4, 2015
- Genres: Contemporary Christian music, Christian electronic dance music, electropop
- Length: 48:35
- Label: Word

Blanca chronology
| Who I Am (2014) | Blanca (2015) | Shattered (2018) |

Singles from Blanca
- 1. "Who I Am" Released: December 4, 2014; 2. "Greater Is He" Released: September 22, 2015; 3. "Not Backing Down (feat. Tedashii)" Released: June 13, 2016; 4. "Echo" Released: July 22, 2016; 5. "Different Drum" Released: 2017

Blanca is the first studio album by Blanca. Word Records released the album on May 4, 2015.

== Critical reception ==
Professional ratings
Review scores
| Source | Rating |
|---|---|
| 365 Days of Inspiring Media | 4/5 stars |
| CCM Magazine | 4/5 stars |
| Christian Music Review | 3.8/5 |
| Cross Rhythms | 6/10 squares |
| Jesus Freak Hideout | 3/5 stars |
| Louder Than the Music | 4/5 stars |
| New Release Tuesday | 3.5/5 stars |
| The Phantom Tollbooth | 3.5/5 |

Andy Argyrakis, awarding the album four stars at CCM Magazine, states, "the self-titled long player seamlessly switches between pop, hip hop and the dance floor, all adorned with the latest production trends, plus perhaps most importantly, fear-shattering and faith-fueling lyrics gleaned from autobiographical inspiration." Signaling in a three star review by Jesus Freak Hideout, Christopher Smith writes, "Blanca's beautiful voice and diverse collection of styles make the first few listens exciting, but several more spins reveal that the album is less memorable than those initial impressions suggest." Mark Ryan, indicating in a three and a half star review from New Release Tuesday, says, "it did not push the limits as far as I was hoping, but there's plenty here to love."

Michael Dalton, rating the album three and a half out of five for The Phantom Tollbooth, describes, "This is a fine debut...that stands on the shoulders of artists, some previously mentioned, who have given us some of the best music this world has ever heard." Giving the album a 3.8 out of five at Christian Music Review, Laura Chambers states, "This album will bolster your faith and provide discouragement-busting anthems for any struggle you face." Joshua Andre, awarding the album four stars from 365 Days of Inspiring Media, says, the "new album is something to be celebrated as it marks the beginning of a new chapter, with plenty of new hits and potential singles".

== Track listing ==
| No. | Title | Writer(s) | Length |
|---|---|---|---|
| 1. | "Different Drum" | Casey Brown, Blanca Callahan, Parker Welling | 3:29 |
| 2. | "Who I Am" | Callahan, Mia Fieldes, Seth Mosley | 3:12 |
| 3. | "If You Say Go" | Callahan, Jeff Pardo, Molly Reed | 3:22 |
| 4. | "Get Up" (featuring Lecrae) | Dustin "DAB" Bowie, Callahan, Kenneth Chris Mackey, Lecrae Moore, Joseph Prielozny | 3:40 |
| 5. | "Surrender" | Callahan, Bernie Herms, Stephanie Lewis | 4:02 |
| 6. | "Echo" | Callahan, Fieldes, Tedd Tjornhom | 3:38 |
| 7. | "Catching Fire" | Callahan, Jeff Sojka, Josh Zegan | 2:53 |
| 8. | "Sunshine" | Brown, Callahan, Jason Ingram | 3:38 |
| 9. | "Not Backing Down" (featuring Tedashii) | Tedashii Anderson, Callahan, Jordan Sapp | 3:18 |
| 10. | "Forever Love" | Brown, Callahan, Tauren Wells | 3:31 |
| 11. | "Worry" | Callahan, Mosley, Sam Tinnesz | 2:52 |
| 12. | "Greater Is He" | Brown, Callahan, Ingram | 3:44 |
| 13. | "Today" | Brown, Callahan, Ingram | 3:18 |
| 14. | "Chosen Ones" | Callahan, Sojka, Zegan | 3:58 |
| Total length: | | | 48:35 |

== Charts ==
| Chart (2015) | Peak position |
|---|---|
| US Billboard 200 | 196 |
| US Top Christian Albums (Billboard) | 7 |
