= Blanca (singer) =

Puerto Rican-American Christian pop singer-songwriter

- Also known as: Blanca Callahan
- Born: Blanca Elaine Reyes; February 10, 1986 (age 40); Puerto Rico
- Origin: Orlando, Florida, U.S.
- Genre: Contemporary Christian music
- Occupations: Singer, songwriter
- Instrument: Vocals
- Years active: 2003–present
- Label: Word
- Formerly of: Group 1 Crew
- Website: officialblanca.com

Blanca Elaine Reyes (born February 10, 1986), who goes by the mononym Blanca, is a Puerto Rican-born American Contemporary Christian music singer-songwriter. Until 2013, she was a member of Group 1 Crew. She is now a solo artist. She released her debut EP on January 13, 2015, Who I Am EP, with Word Records and her first studio album, Blanca, on May 4, 2015.

== Early life ==
Blanca was born Blanca Elaine Reyes, in Puerto Rico on February 10, 1986.

Her father struggled with drug and alcohol addictions until his conversion to Christianity, after which he led himself and his family into the faith.

== Music career ==
Blanca was a member of Group 1 Crew from its inception until 2013, when she began her solo career. She collaborated with the group Building 429 for the song "Press On" which charted at position 7 on the Billboard Christian Songs chart, and stayed on the chart for 26 weeks. She also collaborated on songs in Spanish, such as the introduction of the album Más by Redimi2 and Funky.

Blanca's debut album titled Blanca was released on May 4, 2015, on Word Records. Her first solo single, "Who I Am", ranked number one on the Billboard Christian Airplay chart and number 27 on the annual chart. Her second release as a solo artist, Who I Am EP, was released on January 13, 2015, also via Word Records, and was placed on Billboard Hot 100 and Hot Christian Songs charts.

Blanca's solo career continued with the release of the album Shattered in 2018, which was subsequently re-released entirely in Spanish as Quebrantado, featuring Redimi2 and Tye Tribbett, again entering the Billboard Christian Airplay chart. In 2019, she was part of the main cast of the Bogotá Gospel event, sharing the stage with artists such as Alex Zurdo, Danilo Montero, and others, in addition to being awarded at the Tecla awards as Best Musician Creating Content on Social Networks.

Cultivating her Latin roots, in 2020 she announced her second EP in Spanish titled Renovada, handling singles mostly in Spanish and collaborations with Christine D'Clario, Gawvi, "Papi Song" with Genio, in honor of her father Toñito Reyes, who was a Christian salsero in Puerto Rico, and others. In 2025, Blanca released the single "Are You Ready," a hip-hop-driven track that showcases her genre-blending, multilingual style. The song has been well-received, further establishing her presence in the Latin music scene. Additionally, she was nominated for a Puerto Rico Music Award for her 2024 hit "Worthy," featuring Yandel.

== Personal life ==
On January 21, 2013, Blanca announced that she and her husband, Ben Callahan of Group 1 Crew, were expecting their first child. She had a son, named London, in July 2013. On December 1, 2020, Blanca announced that she and her husband had divorced.

== Discography ==
=== Studio albums ===
List of studio albums, with selected chart positions
Title	Album details	Peak chart positions	
Title	Album details	US	US Christ
Blanca	Released: May 4, 2015; Label: Word; Formats: CD, digital download	196	7
Shattered	Released: September 14, 2018; Label: Word; Formats: CD, digital download	—	— (Note: Shattered did not enter the Billboard Top Christian Albums chart, but peaked at No. 16 on the Billboard Christian Album Sales chart.)
The Heartbreak and the Healing	Released: September 23, 2022; Label: Word; Formats: CD, digital download	—	—
Full Bloom	Released: October 17, 2025; Label: Curb; Formats: CD, digital download	—	—

=== EPs ===
List of EPs, with selected chart positions
Title	EP details	Peak chart positions	
Title	EP details	US Christ	US Heat
Who I Am	Released: January 13, 2015; Label: Word; Formats: CD, digital download	19	11
Real Love	Released: September 22, 2017; Label: Word; Formats: CD, digital download	— (Note: Real Love did not enter the Billboard Top Christian Albums chart, but peaked at No. 36 on the Billboard Christian Album Sales chart.)	—
Quebrantado	Released: August 30, 2019; Label: Word; Formats: CD, digital download	—	—
Renovada	Released: April 2, 2021; Label: Word; Formats: CD, digital download	—	—
A Christmas to Remember	Released: November 21, 2025; Label: Curb; Formats: Digital download, streaming	—	—

=== Singles ===
Year	Title	Chart positions				Album
Year	Title	US AC	US Christ	US Christ Air.	US Christ AC	Album
2015	"Who I Am"	—	12	9	8	Blanca
2015	"Winter Wonderland"	—	26	11	6	Bethlehem Skies
2015	"Greater Is He"	—	19	13	23	Blanca
2016	"Not Backing Down" (featuring Tedashii)	—	30	29	—	Blanca
2016	"Echo"	—	—	30	—	Blanca
2017	"Different Drum"	—	28	25	—	Blanca
2017	"Real Love"	—	32	28	26	Shattered
2018	"Amor Real"	—	—	—	—	Quebrantado (EP)
2018	"What If"	—	49	26	—	Shattered
2019	"Remind Me"	—	—	46	—	Shattered
2020	"Shattered"	—	—	33	—	Shattered
2021	"Soy" (featuring Christine D'Clario)	—	—	—	—	Renovada (EP)
2021	"Zone" (featuring Gawvi)	—	—	—	—	Renovada (EP)
2021	"Even at My Worst"	15	19	—	18	The Heartbreak and the Healing
2022	"The Healing" (with Dante Bowe)	—	10	10	12	The Heartbreak and the Healing
2022	"New Day" (with Jekalyn Carr)	—	—	—	—	The Heartbreak and the Healing
2023	"Something Better" (solo or with Tauren Wells)	12	12	14	22	Non-album single
2024	"Worthy" (English or in Spanish with Yandel)	—	—	—	—	Full Bloom
2025	"Are You Ready"	—	—	—	—	Full Bloom
2025	"This Won't Take My Praise" (featuring Taylor Hill)	—	—	—	—	Full Bloom
2025	"O Come, All Ye Faithful"	—	—	6	10	A Christmas to Remember (EP)

=== Other charted songs ===
Year	Title	Chart positions			Album
Year	Title	US Christ Air	US Christ AC	US AC	Album
2025	"Let It Snow"	—	—	23	A Christmas to Remember
2026	"I'm Yours" (with Ryan Ellis)	22	21	—	Full Bloom

=== Album appearances ===
Artist	Album	Song
Michael Tait and Lecrae	Music Inspired by The Story	"Bring Us Home (Joshua)"
KJ-52	The Yearbook	"You're Gonna Make It"
Mandisa	Freedom	"The Definition of Me"
KJ-52	Five-Two Television	"Firestarter"
TobyMac	Eye On It	"Unstoppable"
Audio Adrenaline	Kings & Queens	"20:17 (Raise the Banner)"
Redimi2 & Funky	#Más	"Más"
Hawk Nelson	Made	"Elevator"
Building 429	We Won't Be Shaken	"Wrecking Ball (Press On)"
KB	Tomorrow We Live	"Lights Go Out" (featuring Blanca and Justin Ebach)
Redimi2, Funky & Alex Zurdo	UNO	"Cruzaré" (featuring Blanca)
Gawvi	Noche Juvenil	"Corillo" (featuring Blanca & WXLF")

== Awards and nominations ==
=== Tecla Awards ===
Year	Category	Nominee	Result	Ref.
2019	Best Musician Creating Social Content	Herself	Won	

=== GMA Dove Awards ===
Year	Category	Nominee	Result	Ref.
2021	Spanish Language Album of the Year	Renovada (EP)	Nominated	
2023	Contemporary Gospel Recorded Song of the Year	"New Day" (featuring Jekalyn Carr)	Nominated	
2023	Spanish Language Recorded Song of the Year	“Nubes” (featuring Indiomar)	Nominated	
2024	Recorded Music Packaging of the Year	The Heartbreak and the Healing (Deluxe)	Nominated	
2025	Spanish Language Recorded Song of the Year	"Worthy" (featuring Yandel)	Nominated	

=== We Love Christian Music Awards ===
Year	Category	Nominee	Result	Ref.
2025	Contemporary Song of the Year	"This Won't Take My Praise" (with Taylor Hill)	Nominated	

=== Puerto Rico Music Awards ===
Year	Category	Nominee	Result	Ref.
2025	Cancion Cristiana / Espiritual (Spiritual / Christian Song) of the Year	"Worthy" (featuring Yandel"	Nominated	

=== K-Love Fan Awards ===
Year	Category	Nominee	Result	Ref.
2022	Female Artist of the Year	Herself	Nominated	
2026	Female Artist of the Year	Herself	Nominated	
