= Graves (song) =

2022 song by KB and Brandon Lake

Single by KB and Brandon Lake

from the album His Glory Alone II
- Released: October 28, 2022
- Genre: Christian hip hop
- Length: 4:20; 4:18 (acoustic)
- Label: HGA; Provident Label Group
- Songwriters: Brandon Lake; Chris Brown; Kevin Elijah Burgess; Quinten Coblentz; Steven Furtick; Tiffany Hudson; Wesley Smith
- Producer: Wearethegood

KB singles chronology
"Eagle" (2022)	"Graves" (2022)	"EZ" (2023)

Brandon Lake singles chronology
"Gratitude" (2022)	"Graves" (2022)	"Fear Is Not My Future" (2022)

Alternative cover
- Acoustic version cover

Music videos
- "Graves" on YouTube
- "Graves" (Acoustic) on YouTube

"Graves" is a song performed by American Christian rapper KB and American contemporary worship musician Brandon Lake. The song was released on October 28, 2022, as the lead single from KB's fourth album, His Glory Alone II. The song was written by KB, Wesley Smith, and Quinten Coblentz, with Brandon Lake, Chris Brown, and Steven Furtick being credited as songwriters on account of the sampling of the hit song "Graves into Gardens" by Elevation Worship and Lake. Wearethegood handled the production of the single.

The song peaked at number 33 on the US Hot Christian Songs chart published by Billboard. At the 2023 GMA Dove Awards, "Graves" was nominated for the Rap/Hip Hop Recorded Song of the Year and Short Form Music Video of the Year (Performance) awards.

== Background ==
On October 28, 2022, KB released "Graves" with Brandon Lake, a collaborative track sampling Elevation Worship and Lake's hit single, "Graves into Gardens". The song serves as the lead single from KB's upcoming album, with its music video premiering on BET Gospel. KB spoke of the song, saying ""Graves" celebrates the God who does more than make bad good but He makes the dead life. What it means to follow Jesus, is to believe in a resurrected existence that can spring forth out of the most difficult & desperate situations. God loves to bring gardens from graves and life from death."

== Critical reception ==
Joshua Galla of NewReleaseToday wrote his opinion of the song, saying "Like most of KB's lyrical skills, the metaphors and wordplay included are some of his best on display. The Lara Croft and Rick Flair references are elite. The production attributes are worthy of their own praise. The overall energy infusing worship and hip-hop never get old."

=== Awards and nominations ===
Awards
Year	Organization	Award	Result	Ref
2023	GMA Dove Awards	Rap/Hip Hop Recorded Song of the Year	Won	
2023	GMA Dove Awards	Short Form Music Video of the Year (Performance)	Nominated	

== Composition ==
"Graves" is composed in the key of A with a tempo of 143 beats per minute, and a musical time signature of 4/4.

== Commercial performance ==
"Graves" debuted at No. 33 on the US Hot Christian Songs chart dated November 12, 2022, concurrently charting at No. 24 on the Christian Digital Song Sales chart.

== Music videos ==
The official music video of "Graves" was published on YouTube by KB on October 28, 2022. The music video was directed by Juan Garcia and produced by Jayson Palacio. It showcases KB performing the song in a dark room with screens showing lyrics to the song and smoke on the floor resembling clouds.

The official acoustic video of "Graves" was published on YouTube by KB on December 2, 2022. The video shows KB and Lake performing the song.

== Track listing ==
"Graves"
No.	Title	Writer(s)	Producer(s)	Length
1.	"Graves" (with Brandon Lake)	Brandon Lake; Chris Brown; Kevin Elijah Burgess; Quinten Coblentz; Steven Furtick; Tiffany Hudson; Wesley Smith	Wearethegood	4:20

"Graves" (Acoustic)
No.	Title	Length
1.	"Graves" (with Brandon Lake; Acoustic)	4:18
2.	"Graves" (with Brandon Lake)	4:20
Total length:		8:38

== Charts ==
Chart performance for "Graves"
Chart (2022)	Peak position
US Hot Christian Songs (Billboard)	33

== Release history ==
Release history and formats for "Graves"
Region	Date	Version	Format	Label	Ref.
Various	October 28, 2022	Original	Digital download; streaming	HGA; Provident Label Group	
Various	January 13, 2023	Acoustic	Digital download; streaming	HGA; Provident Label Group	
