= Building 429 (album) =

Studio album by Building 429
- Released: October 21, 2008
- Studio: FabMusic (Franklin, Tennessee); The Smoakstack (Nashville, Tennessee)
- Genre: Christian rock
- Length: 42:13
- Label: INO
- Producer: Christopher Stevens

Building 429 chronology
Glory Defined: The Best of Building 429 (2008)	Building 429 (2008)	Listen to the Sound (2011)

Professional ratings
Review scores
Source	Rating
AllMusic	4/5 stars
Jesus Freak Hideout	3/5 stars

Building 429 is the sixth studio self-titled album by Christian rock band, Building 429, which was released on October 21, 2008 through INO Records. This recording is the band's fourth full-length major label recording.

== Track listing ==
Album release
No.	Title	Writer(s)	Length
1.	"Not Gonna Let You Down"	Michael Anderson, Scott Faircloff, Jesse Garcia, Jason Roy, Christopher Stevens	4:34
2.	"End of Me"	James Rueger, Tony Wood	3:53
3.	"Erase"	Josiah Bell, Robert Marvin, Sam Mizell, Jason Roy	4:21
4.	"Overcome"	James Rueger, Tony Wood	3:28
5.	"Always"	Jason Roy	5:30
6.	"Shoulder"	Sam Mizell, Jason Roy	3:30
7.	"Bring Me Back"	Jason Roy, Christopher Stevens	3:46
8.	"Your Love Goes On"	Scott Faircloff, Jason Roy	3:58
9.	"Coming Home"	Jesse Garcia, Sam Mizell, Jason Roy	3:54
10.	"Oxygen (Bringing Me to Life)"	Jason Roy	5:19
Total length:			42:18

== Personnel ==
Building 429

- Jason Roy – lead and backing vocals, guitars
- Jesse Garcia – keyboards, guitars, backing vocals
- Michael Anderson – drums

Additional musicians

- Christopher Stevens – programming, guitars, backing vocals
- Paul Moak – guitars
- Tony Lucido – bass
- Claire Indie – cello (3, 5)
- Zach Casebolt – violin (3, 5)
- Chris Rodriguez – backing vocals

Production

- James Rueger – A&R
- Christopher Stevens – producer, recording, mixing
- Paul Moak – additional engineer, editing
- Kevin Powell – additional engineer, editing
- Hank Williams – mastering at MasterMix (Nashville, Tennessee)
- Dana Salsedo – creative direction
- Matt Taylor – art direction, design
- Zec Petaja – photography
- Thomas Vasquez Entertainment LLC – management
