= Iris to Iris =

Studio album by Building 429
- Released: May 1, 2007
- Studio: Chateau 541 and Oxford Sound (Nashville, Tennessee)
- Genre: Christian rock
- Length: 51:51
- Label: Word
- Producer: Brown Bannister

Building 429 chronology
Rise (2006)	Iris to Iris (2007)	Glory Defined: The Best of Building 429 (2008)

Professional ratings
Review scores
Source	Rating
AllMusic	4/5 stars
Jesus Freak Hideout	3/5 stars
Patrol Magazine	(3.9/10)

Iris to Iris is the fifth studio album by Christian rock band Building 429, which was released on May 1, 2007 through Word Records. This recording is the band's third full-length major label recording. A digital single for the album track, "Grace That Is Greater", was released through iTunes on March 6, 2007.

== Track listing ==
Album release
No.	Title	Writer(s)	Length
1.	"Power of Your Name"	Jason Roy, Chris Eaton	4:32
2.	"Majesty"	Roy	4:47
3.	"Singing Over Me"	Roy, Eaton, Michael Anderson	4:00
4.	"You Carried Me"	Roy	5:52
5.	"Amazed"	Roy	4:52
6.	"Incredible"	Roy, Eaton	3:52
7.	"Waiting to Shine"	Jesse Garcia, Roy	5:21
8.	"Taken"	Roy	4:10
9.	"New Season"	Garcia, Roy	4:12
10.	"Constant"	Scotty Beshears, Garcia, Roy, Anderson	6:04
11.	"Grace That Is Greater"	Roy, Matt Blair	4:09
Total length:			52:00

== Personnel ==
Building 429

- Jason Roy – lead and backing vocals, guitars
- Jesse Garcia – keyboards, guitars, backing vocals
- Michael Anderson – drums

Additional musicians

- Blair Masters – keyboards, programming
- Otto Price – bass
- Eric Darken – percussion

Production

- Otto Price – executive producer, A&R
- Brown Bannister – producer, engineer
- Steve Bishir – recording, mixing
- Michael Anderson – engineer
- George Cocchini – engineer
- Aaron Sternke – engineer
- Bill Whittington – engineer
- F. Reid Shippen – mixing
- Buckley Miller – mix assistant
- Natthaphol Abhigantaphad – mix assistant
- Stephen Marcussen – mastering at Marcussen Mastering (Hollywood, California)
- Katherine Petillo – creative direction
- Thomas Petillo – photography
- Amber Lehman – wardrobe
