= Where I Belong (Building 429 song) =

Single by Building 429

from the album Listen to the Sound
- Released: 2012
- Genre: Christian rock
- Length: 3:22
- Label: Essential
- Songwriters: Jason Roy, Jason Ingram

Music video
- "Where I Belong" on YouTube

"Where I Belong" is a song by Christian rock band Building 429 from their 2011 album Listen to the Sound. Written by Jason Roy and Jason Ingram, it was released on Essential Records. It was named 2013 Billboard Magazine Christian Song of the Year after topping the US Billboard Christian Songs chart. It was certified gold by the Recording Industry Association of America (RIAA). "Where I Belong" also appears on WOW Hits 2013.

== Meaning ==
Roy said about the song: "'Where I Belong' is one song the whole thought process of the record was built on, basically saying that nothing on earth can ever satisfy us or make us feel whole because it's not our home... We're made for His glory and His glory alone and it's basically my 'bring it on song' [against earthly temptation] that feels like a rocket going to the moon."

== Chart performance ==
The song topped the US Billboard Christian Songs chart for 15 consecutive weeks, the longest-running No. 1 single of 2013.

"Where I Belong" was ranked as the 2013 Billboard Magazine Christian Song of the Year, despite a big showing by Matt Redman and his song "10,000 Reasons (Bless the Lord)" that had three separate stints at No. 1 for a total of 13 weeks that year. The song spent 63 weeks in total in the Christian Songs chart.

== Charts ==
=== Weekly charts ===
Chart (2012)	Peak position
US Bubbling Under Hot 100 (Billboard)	19
US Christian AC (Billboard)	1
US Christian Airplay (Billboard)	1
US Heatseekers Songs (Billboard)	20
US Hot Christian Songs (Billboard)	1

=== Year-end charts ===
Chart (2012)	Peak position
US Christian Songs (Billboard)	1
US Christian AC (Billboard)	1

=== Decade-end charts ===
Chart (2010s)	Position
US Christian Songs (Billboard)	8

== Certifications ==
Region	Certification	Certified units/sales
United States (RIAA)	Gold	500,000^{‡}
^{‡} Sales+streaming figures based on certification alone.
