= Listen to the Sound =

Studio album by Building 429
- Released: May 10, 2011
- Recorded: 2011
- Studios: Tomahawk Recording and Superphonic Studios (Nashville, Tennessee)
- Genre: Christian Rock
- Length: 37:10
- Label: Provident
- Producers: Jason Ingram: Rusty Varenkamp; Rob Hawkins

Building 429 chronology
Building 429 (2008)	Listen to the Sound (2011)	We Won't Be Shaken (2013)

Listen to the Sound is the seventh studio album by Christian rock band Building 429, and is their fifth album with a major label. It was released on May 10, 2011, through Provident Music Group.

== Composition ==
The song "Listen to the Sound" was written according to the lead singer Jason Roy because "the idea behind the title track for the record is looking at the noisy world we live in and thinking about how much noise we're adding to it...my barometer is myself and I talk so much that I rarely take time to hear the sound of God's voice! We don't find the answers to the big questions by talking, crying or even praying, but in taking the time to be still and listen for the voice of God speaking hope and grace." Roy said the song entitled "'Where I Belong' is one song the whole thought process of the record was built on, basically saying that nothing on earth can ever satisfy us or make us feel whole because it's not our home...it's funny because a lot of the songs tie into that same theme, like 'Made For You,' which is about fighting until we get home [to heaven]. We're made for His glory and His glory alone and it's basically my 'bring it on song' [against earthly temptation] that feels like a rocket going to the moon."

== Reception ==
=== Critical ===
Professional ratings
Review scores
Source	Rating
AllMusic	4/5 stars
Alt Rock Live	6/10
CCM Magazine	3/5 stars
Christian Broadcasting Network	4/5 stars
Cross Rhythms	9/10 stars
Jesus Freak Hideout	2.5/5 stars
Louder Than the Music	4/5 stars
New Release Tuesday	5/5 stars
The Phantom Tollbooth	4.5/5 stars

AllMusic's Jared Johnson said the album "feels like an arrival for Christian rockers Building 429, ironically the result of spending more time on the road and less in the studio. Coming almost three years since their self-titled magnum opus, the band's fifth album finds them more confident than ever in proclaiming their witness and writing memorable mainstream rock. Where the band worked hard to carve out its identity on previous releases, Jason Roy and company sound more than ever like they're having fun this time around." At Cross Rhythms, Neil Fix said that "I don't really know which tracks to draw potential purchasers to because there isn't a bad song on here." Fix went on to say "I love it, and will definitely be recommending it to pretty much everyone I know." Jay Rae of the Christian Broadcasting Network said "the entire album is a completed work. Listeners without fail will engage with Building 429's tracks while enjoying profound lyrical transparency wrapped in the sounds of musical excellence."

Louder Than the Music's Jono Davies wrote that "I do like it, I have to admit I don't love it, but I do think it's a very good album. After numerous plays I do continue to find some great moments within these strong songs. This album is a step forward for Building 429". Furthermore, Davies noted that the album "has a more family feel, in the same way that Coldplay are a band that the whole family will enjoy." Davies said the "Standout Tracks" are the following: "You Save Me", "Walls Are Coming Down" and "One Foot". At New Release Tuesday, Kevin Davis said the album "is the band’s crowning achievement in my opinion. If you’re looking for some songs that you’ll love to sing along with at high volumes and in praise to our Savior, then you’ll totally want to 'listen to the sound' of Building 429. I recently listened to all 54 songs by B429 and these 10 songs all rank in my top 15 songs ever recorded by this amazing band, along with "Glory Defined," "The Space In Between Us," "You Carried Me," "End Of Me" and "Always." No filler tracks, just one solid song after another." Scott Mertens of The Phantom Tollbooth wrote "the combination of finding their 'sway', the signature vocals of Jason Roy, and well written songs gives Building 429 another winner in Listen To The Sound. In this offering, Building 429 has again found their true cadence." Also, Mertens noted that "with Listen To The Sound the energy was returned, in force!"

Alt Rock Live's Jonathan Faulkner wrote about the album that it "seems to let down those who it is lifting up. However die-hard listeners will no doubt like this album for years to come. Here's to hoping that their next project is just as encouraging, with a lot more depth." Roger Gelwicks of Jesus Freak Hideout said if this "is the measuring stick of Building 429's musicianship, the bar remains terribly low with their best probably behind them." Gelwicks continued on saying that this "is yet another unoriginal rendition of defining glory." At CCM Magazine, Grace S. Aspinwall said "all the tracks are melodic, strong and some of the group's very best work. Hints of sounds akin to Newsboys and Third Day will make this not a groundbreaking album, but a versatile one, not to mention an undeniable good time."

=== Commercial ===
Former Major League Baseball outfielder David Murphy used "Where I Belong" as his walk-up music.

== Track listing ==
No.	Title	Writer(s)	Length
1.	"Made for You"	Jason Roy, Jason Ingram	4:37
2.	"Right Beside You" (featuring Dawn Michele of Fireflight)	Roy	3:33
3.	"One Foot"	Roy, Tony Wood, Rob Hawkins	3:31
4.	"Listen to the Sound"	Roy, Rob Hawkins	3:41
5.	"War Zone"	Caleb Grimm, Jason Walker	3:39
6.	"Where I Belong"	Roy, Ingram	3:22
7.	"You Save Me"	Roy, Hawkins	3:21
8.	"Walls Are Coming Down"	Roy, Ingram	3:49
9.	"Love Has Been Spoken"	Roy, Hawkins	3:42
10.	"Awaken Us"	Roy, Scott Krippayne	4:00
Total length:			37:10

== Personnel ==
Building 429

- Jason Roy – lead and backing vocals, keyboards, guitars
- Jesse Garcia – keyboards, guitars, backing vocals
- Aaron Branch – bass
- Michael Anderson – drums

Additional musicians

- Jason Ingram – programming
- Rusty Varenkamp – programming
- Rob Hawkins – programming, guitars
- Richard Davis – cello
- Chris Carmichael – strings, string arrangements
- Dawn Michele – lead vocals (2)
- Ametria Dock – backing vocals
- Jason Eskridge – backing vocals
- Natasha Williams – backing vocals
- Dana Austin – vocals
- Blaine Barcus – vocals
- Cooper Boyle – vocals
- Benjamin Brinton – vocals
- DJ Lipscomb – vocals
- Charles Van Dyke – vocals
- AJ Gilmer – vocals
- Ashley Goins – vocals
- Jennifer Harper – vocals
- Scottie Harper – vocals
- David Jordan – vocals
- Tony McBroom – vocals
- Chelsi Miller – vocals
- Heather Bro Moroschak – vocals
- Camaryn Rogers – vocals
- Christy Rowland – vocals
- Anne Nicole Royster – vocals
- Amanda Shannon – vocals
- Mark Stephens – vocals
- AJ Strout – vocals
- Gioia Varenkamp – vocals
- Kristin Watson – vocals
- Jim Wilcox – vocals
- Luellyn Wilcox – vocals
- Jay Wilkinson – vocals
- Nina Williams – vocals
- Tracey Williams – vocals
- Jay Yarbrough – vocals
- Dustin York – vocals

Production

- Jason Ingram – producer (1, 5, 6, 8, 10)
- Rusty Varenkamp – producer (1, 5, 6, 8, 10), recording (1, 5, 6, 8, 10), editing (1, 5, 6, 8, 10)
- Rob Hawkins – producer (2–4, 7, 9), engineer (2–4, 7, 9)
- Ben Phillips – engineer (2–4, 7, 9)
- Matthew Arcaini – assistant engineer (2–4, 7, 9)
- John Denosky – digital editing (2–4, 7, 9)
- Thomas Toner – digital editing (2–4, 7, 9)
- Allen Salmon – mixing
- Crystal Varenkamp – production assistant (1, 5, 6, 8, 10)
- Blaine Barcus – A&R
- Michelle Box – A&R production
- Beth Lee – art direction
- Tim Parker – art direction, design
- Lee Steffen – photography
- Amber Lehman – wardrobe
- Kristopher Whipple – grooming

== Charts ==
=== Album ===
Chart (2011)	Peak position
US Billboard 200	115
US Billboard Christian Albums	2
US Billboard Rock Albums	31

=== Singles ===
Year	Single	Peak chart positions
Year	Single	US Christian
2011	"Listen to the Sound"	4
2012	"Where I Belong"	1
