= Glory Defined (song) =

Single by Building 429

from the album Space in Between Us
- Released: 2004
- Length: 3:23
- Label: Word Records
- Songwriter: Building 429

Glory Defined is a song written and recorded by Christian rock band Building 429. It was released as a single from their 2004 album Space in Between Us and included on WOW Hits 2005.

== Tracklisting ==
No.	Title	Writer(s)	Length
1.	"Glory Defined"	Jim Cooper, Kenny Lamb, Jason Roy	3:23
2.	"No One Else Knows (Demo)"	Jason Roy	4:40

== Charts ==
Weekly

Chart (2003)	Peak Position
U.S. Billboard Christian Songs	1

Decade-end

Chart (2000s)	Position
Billboard Hot Christian Songs	23
