= We Won't Be Shaken =

Studio album by Building 429
- Released: June 4, 2013
- Genre: Christian rock
- Length: 42:39
- Label: Essential
- Producers: Rob Hawkins, Jason Ingram

Building 429 chronology
Listen to the Sound (2011)	We Won't Be Shaken (2013)	Unashamed (2015)

Singles from We Won't Be Shaken
- 1. "We Won't Be Shaken" Released: March 1, 2013; 2. "Wrecking Ball (Press On)" Released: January 2014

We Won't Be Shaken is the eighth studio album by Christian rock band, Building 429 and their sixth with a major label in Essential Records. The producers on the album are Rob Hawkins and Jason Ingram. It was released June 4, 2013 through Provident Music Group distribution. It was nominated for "Best Contemporary Christian Music Album" at the 56th Annual Grammy Awards. It lost to Overcomer by Mandisa.

== Music and lyrics ==
Emily Kjonaas of Christian Music Zine wrote that this album is "infused with pop and rock". At CCM Magazine, Andy Argyrakis wrote that "this album is lyrically bolder than ever before, inspiring listeners to pursue 'God-sized dreams' with the rockin' "Revolution" and "Bonfire" assertively leading the charge." Indie Vision Music's Jonathan Andre noted that "with hopeful lyrics and powerful guitar hooks, We Won't Be Shaken is able to declare timeless truths in a relevant and edgy way destined to draw in young listeners looking for a song with meaning and hope." At About.com, Kim Jones highlighted that "this reflective album will shake you if you're breathing because it will cause you to really look at yourself, your walk and your real level of faith", and told that "being shaken up is a good thing sometimes because it makes us move and grow." Scott Mertens of The Phantom Tollbooth told that "Roy's signature vocal qualities give depth and honesty to the collection", which comes "with a good message, well written and produced", and noted that "Album after album, Building 429 shows consistency of message and musical growth."

Jonathan Francesco of New Release Tuesday stated that "Building 429 has kept everything that you loved about them: the Christ-centered lyrics, the upbeat light rock, the rousing chants to get crowds hopping, and the thoughtful introspective side that shows that these guys possess a deep love for their faith and a heart for Christ they long to share in their music." Holly Cooke of Cross Rhythms felt that "some of the songs here are less like thundering rock anthems and more like pop fillers". Louder Than the Music's Jono Davies told that "Building 429 have put together an album full of strong songs that any artist would have been proud to have written." In addition, Davies wrote that "these songs do is try and inspire and encourage you to hold onto what God wants for your lives", and noted that the album contains a new "theme [that] is fantastic." Justin Croteau of HM wrote that "passion-filled record that will also make you want to get up and move."

At Jesus Freak Hideout, Roger Gelwick felt that "unfortunately, this also results in relying on their 'same old' for We Won't be Shaken, even closing out the set with a live recording of "Where I Belong" to drill in that message even more." However, Francesco did not feel this way, when he wrote that "on top of all of this, they've gone and explored some new sounds to effective results." At Worship Leader, Jay Akins wrote that "Building 429 delivers powerful & biblically solid lyrics wrapped in a thoughtfully balanced mix of ballads & rock anthems", and that the release is "masterfully written and produced", which "is truly a joy to listen to." He noted that the only thing that could have made this effort better would have been "to have at least one congregational worship song on this record."

== Critical reception ==
Professional ratings
Review scores
Source	Rating
About.com	5/5 stars
CCM Magazine	3/5 stars
Christian Music Zine	4/5 stars
Cross Rhythms	8/10 squares
HM	3.5/5 stars
Indie Vision Music	4/5 stars
Jesus Freak Hideout	3/5 stars
Louder Than the Music	4.5/5 stars
New Release Tuesday	4/5 stars
The Phantom Tollbooth	3.5/5 stars
Worship Leader	4.5/5 stars

We Won't Be Shaken has received generally positive reviews from music critics. At Christian Music Zine, Emily Kjonaas claimed that "We Won't Be Shaken is sure to inspire anyone." Jonathan Andre of Indie Vision Music exclaimed that "well done Building 429 for a stellar album full of lyrics destined to be in the hearts and on the lips of many in months and years to come!" New Release Tuesday's Jonathan Francesco proclaimed that "this is a fine album full of potential hits and is sure to raise the bar for them next time around."

At About.com, Kim Jones noted how "starting strong and finishing the same way, this is 41 minutes of musical might!" At Cross Rhythms, Holly Cooke wrote that "the strong drum beats, memorable lyrics and powerful vocals demonstrate Building 429 has lost none of their winning ways with memorable hooks for which American radio stations love them." Louder Than the Music's Jono Davies proclaimed that the release "has a great theme running throughout", and that this album is truly "a classic rock album with a great meaning."

Jay Akins of Worship Leader found that "Building 429 has continued to exceed our expectations with every song", and said that "from beginning to end Building 429 impresses with We Won't Be Shaken!" At HM, Justin Croteau called this "a heartwarming record with songs that will be stuck in your head for days to come." Scott Mertens at The Phantom Tollbooth called the release "a solid collection" that "also has strength and growth in faith."

At CCM Magazine, Andy Argyrakis called Building 429 "an established force on radio that continues to craft melodic, hook filled modern pop (in spite of some rudimentary arrangements)." Roger Gelwicks of Jesus Freak Hideout told that "save for exceptional moments, We Won't Be Shaken doesn't pull any punches, but it capitalizes on Building 429's reputation as a crowd-pleasing pop/rock quartet [...] even if they could afford to shake things up a bit more." Also, Jesus Freak Hideout's Bert Gangl wrote that "We Won't Be Shaken, perhaps more than anything else, is an album of halves."

== Track listing ==
All tracks are written by I was trying to publish the page.

No.	Title	Writer(s)	Length
1.	"Get Up"	Rob Hawkins, Jason Roy	4:10
2.	"Bonfire"	Hawkins, Roy	3:28
3.	"Wrecking Ball (Press On)" (featuring Blanca Callahan of Group 1 Crew)	Hawkins, Roy	2:49
4.	"We Won't Be Shaken"	Casey Brown, Tim Rosenau, Roy, Jonathan Smith	3:56
5.	"Set a Fire"	Brown, Rosenau, Roy, Smith	3:42
6.	"Revolution"	Hawkins, Roy	4:14
7.	"All I'm Holding"	Jason Ingram, Roy	4:00
8.	"Best and Worst"	Michael Anderson, Hawkins, Roy	3:16
9.	"Blameless"	Hawkins, Roy	4:07
10.	"All the Glory"	Ingram, Roy	5:26
11.	"Where I Belong" (live)	Ingram, Roy	3:31
Total length:			42:39

Deluxe Edition
No.	Title	Writer(s)	Length
12.	"Listen to the Sound" (live)	Hawkins, Roy	3:13
13.	"Made for You" (live)	Ingram, Roy	4:16
14.	"White Flag"	Matt Redman, Chris Tomlin, Ingram, Matt Maher	4:45
15.	"Impossible"	Brown, Chuck Butler, Roy	3:40

== Personnel ==
Building 429

- Jason Roy – lead and backing vocals
- Jesse Garcia – electric guitars
- Aaron Branch – bass
- Michael Anderson – drums, percussion

Additional musicians

- Casey Brown – programming
- Jonathan Smith – programming, acoustic guitar
- Rob Hawkins – programming, guitars
- Jason Ingram – backing vocals
- Blanca Callahan – lead and harmony vocals (3)

Production S

- Rob Hawkins - Producer, Engineer (Tracks 1–3, 6, 8, 9)
- Jason Ingram - Producer (Tracks 4, 5, 7, 10)
- Ben Phillips - Engineer
- Ben Grosse - Mixing (Tracks 1–10)
- Paul Pavao - Mixing Assistant (Tracks 1–10)
- Sean Moffitt - Mixing (Track 11)
- Warren David - Mixing Assistant (Track 11)
- Bob Boyd - Mastering

== Chart performance ==
Chart (2013)	Peak position
US Billboard 200	53
US Top Christian Albums (Billboard)	1
US Top Rock Albums (Billboard)	20
