= Rise (Building 429 album) =

Studio album by Building 429
- Released: March 14, 2006
- Studio: The Bennett House (Franklin, Tennessee): Masterlink Studio (Nashville, Tennessee); The Hideout (Las Vegas, Nevada)
- Genre: Christian rock
- Length: 45:08
- Label: Word
- Producer: Monroe Jones

Building 429 chronology
Space in Between Us (2004)	Rise (2006)	Iris to Iris (2007)

Professional ratings
Review scores
Source	Rating
AllMusic	3.5/5 stars
Jesus Freak Hideout	3.5/5 stars

Rise is the fourth album by Christian rock band Building 429, which was released in 2006 by Word Records. It is also the band's second full-length recording on a major label. Radio singles from this album include "Searching for a Savior", "Fearless", "I Belong to You" and "I Believe".

== Track listing ==
Album release
No.	Title	Writer(s)	Length
1.	"Searching for a Savior"	Jason Roy	3:57
2.	"Fearless"	Jesse Garcia, Roy	3:35
3.	"Home"	Scotty Beshears, Garcia, Roy	4:07
4.	"I Belong to You"	Roy	3:48
5.	"Fighting to Survive"	Roy	3:44
6.	"Because You're Mine"	Beshears, Garcia, Mac Powell, Roy	4:54
7.	"I Believe (Jesus Is the Answer)"	Matthew Senatore, Eliot Sloan	4:23
8.	"Rise"	Roy	4:25
9.	"Now That It's Over"	Beshears, Garcia, Roy	3:42
10.	"Empty" (featuring Michael Tait)	Roy	3:59
11.	"Alive"	Roy	4:34
Total length:			45:05

== Personnel ==
Building 429

- Jason Roy – lead vocals, guitars
- Jessie Garcia – acoustic piano, guitars, backing vocals
- Scotty Beshares – bass
- Michael Anderson – drums

Additional musicians

- Paul Bowden – additional guitars
- Tom Bukovac – acoustic guitar
- Ken Lewis – drums, percussion
- Matt Walker – cello
- Monisa Angell – viola
- Kristin Wilkinson – viola
- David Angell – violin
- David Davidson – violin
- Michael Mellett – backing vocals
- Michael Tait – lead and harmony vocals (10)

== Production ==
- Otto Price – executive producer
- Monroe Jones – producer
- Jim Dineen – engineer
- Chris Yoakum – assistant engineer
- Shane D. Wilson – mixing
- Pete Carlson – mix assistant
- John Baldwin – digital editing
- Brent Kaye – digital editing
- Andrew Mendelson – mastering at Georgetown Masters (Nashville, Tennessee)
- Cheryl H. McTyne – A&R administration
- Jamie Kiner – production coordinator
- Katherine Petillo – creative direction
- Bethany Newman – design
- Aaron Rapoport – photography
- David Kaufman – wardrobe stylist
- Thomas Vasquez – management
