= Unashamed (album) =

Studio album by Building 429
- Released: September 25, 2015
- Studio: Full Circle Music and Provident Label Group (Franklin, Tennessee); Yackland Studio, The Trophy Room and Tomahawk Recording (Nashville, Tennessee)
- Genre: Christian rock; CCM; Christian alternative rock; pop rock; worship
- Length: 39:58
- Label: Reunion
- Producer: Seth Mosley; Mike "X" O'Connor; Chuck Butler; Jason Ingram; Paul Mabury; Casey Brown; Rob Hawkins; Building 429

Building 429 chronology
We Won't Be Shaken (2013)	Unashamed (2015)	Live the Journey (2018)

Singles from Unashamed
- 1. "Impossible" Released: April 29, 2015; 2. "Unashamed" Released: June 8, 2016

Unashamed is the ninth studio album by Building 429. Reunion Records released the album on September 25, 2015.

== Critical reception ==
Professional ratings
Review scores
Source	Rating
365 Days of Inspiring Media	4.5/5 stars
CCM Magazine	4/5 stars
The Christian Beat	4.9/5
Cross Rhythms	8/10 squares
Jesus Freak Hideout	3/5 stars

Rating the album four stars from CCM Magazine, Matt Conner describes, "Unashamed follows suit with a radio-ready 10-song set of encouraging songs for the church." Bert Gangl, giving the album three stars for Jesus Freak Hideout, writes, "Neither out and out unpleasant nor completely without merit, the new Building 429 record is nevertheless yet one more installment in an ever-growing anthology of prototypical, run-of-the-mill music likely to find little widespread appeal outside the ranks of the already-converted." Awarding the album four and a half stars at 365 Days of Inspiring Media, Jonathan Andre states, "Unashamed is the band's best work yet, and a testament to their longevity, and their relevance in an industry sadly more focused on radio marketability than artistic integrity, endeavours and creativity". Lauren McLean, rating the album a 4.9 out of five from The Christian Beat, says, "They’ve always put out great, heart-filled music for all ages, but Unashamed is definitely one for the history books." Indicating in an eight out of ten review by Cross Rhythms, Tony Cummings responds, "The truth is 'Unashamed' is [skillfully] crafted pop rock and is probably the band's best ever and demonstrates that the band still have plenty of creative fire to take their message to US youth." DeWayne Hamby, reviewing the album for Charisma, writes, "With Unashamed, Building 429 continues...giving believers music that inspires, and encourages them on their personal journeys."

== Track listing ==
No.	Title	Writer(s)	Length
1.	"Eyes Up"	Seth Mosley, Jason Roy	3:53
2.	"Impossible"	Jason Roy, Casey Brown, Chuck Butler	3:40
3.	"Ocean Deep"	Jason Ingram, Jason Roy	3:51
4.	"Unashamed"	Casey Brown, Jason Roy, Jonathan Smith	3:44
5.	"Go"	Dave Wyatt, Elias Dummer, Jason Roy, Jordan Sapp	3:08
6.	"Earth Shaker"	Casey Brown, Jason Roy, Jonathan Smith	3:32
7.	"Hold Them Close"	Casey Brown, Chuck Butler, Jason Roy	3:53
8.	"Be with Us Now (Emmanuel)"	Jason Roy, Rob Hawkins	3:41
9.	"Hearts Collide" (featuring Mike Barnes)	Jason Roy, Rob Hawkins	3:55
10.	"Stronger"	Jason Roy, Rob Hawkins	6:41
Total length:			39:58

== Personnel ==
Building 429

- Jason Roy – lead vocals, backing vocals (1, 2, 4–7), keyboards (1, 5), programming (1, 5), guitars (1, 5), additional electric guitars (7), acoustic guitar (8–10)
- Jesse Garcia – guitars (1, 3, 5), electric guitars (4, 6–10), acoustic guitars (7)
- Aaron Branch – bass (1, 3–10)
- Michael Anderson – drums (1, 3–10)

Additional musicians

- Seth Mosley – keyboards (1, 5), programming (1, 5), guitars (1, 5), drums (1, 5)
- Chuck Butler – programming (2), all other instruments (2), backing vocals (2)
- Mark Shuonen – programming (3)
- Rob Hawkins – programming (8–10), additional guitars (8–10)
- Jonathan Smith – acoustic guitars (4, 6, 7), additional vocals (4, 6), additional electric guitars (6)
- Casey Brown – drums (2), drum programming (2, 4, 6, 7), keyboards (4, 6, 7), synthesizers (4, 6, 7), percussion (4, 6, 7), backing vocals (4, 6, 7), Omnichord (6, 7)
- Jason Ingram – backing vocals (3)
- Christian Cole – backing vocals (5)
- Chris Murphy – backing vocals (5)
- Ally Smith – backing vocals (5)
- Asa Wiggins – backing vocals (5)
- Mike Barnes – lead vocals (9)

Gang vocals (Tracks 1, 3, 4 & 6)

- Kate Allison, Lisa Ball, Tim Ball, Stephanie Beard, Felicia Berry, Jeane Bradley, Austin Gildark, Nicholas Gildark, Justin Gillespie, Natalie Gillespie, David Graber, Margaret Graber, Darius Graner, Jeff Hagen, George Van Horn, Jill Van Horn, Anita King, Vanessa Lydick, Lauren Ponder, Jennifer Pratt, Alison Prentice, David Prentice, Christi Riggs, Kaitlyn Riggs, David Wright, Kelsey Wolfgang, Russell Wolfgang and Vicky Wolfgang

Gang vocals (Track 8)

- Meghan Cannon, Chris Crow, Angela Edwards, Aaron Exler, Shelley Exler, Tony Exler, William Exler, Karleen Hayes, Michael Jewell, Jennifer Oyler, Lorneth Delora Peters, Brandy Seagraves, Christian Stephens, Mark Stephens, Susan Stephens, Vivian Vaughn, Connor Wilcox, Jim Wilcox and LuEllyn Wilcox

== Production ==
- Blaine Barcus – A&R
- Building 429 – co-producers
- Seth Mosley – producer (1, 5)
- Mike "X" O'Connor – producer (1, 5), engineer (1, 5)
- Jericho Scroggins – production assistant (1, 5), engineer (5), editing (5)
- Chuck Butler – producer (2), vocal tracking engineer (7), vocal production (7), vocal editing (7)
- Jason Ingram – producer (3)
- Paul Mabury – producer (3)
- Casey Brown – producer (4, 6, 7), vocal tracking engineer (4, 6), vocal editing (4), additional vocal production (7)
- Rob Hawkins – producer (8–10), engineer (8–10)
- Michael Sanders – editing (1)
- Stephen Lewerke – engineer (3)
- Buckley Miller – band tracking engineer (4, 6, 7), engineer (8–10)
- Aaron Chafin – vocal editing (6)
- Sean Moffitt – mixing
- Warren David – mix assistant
- Bob Boyd – mastering at Ambient Digital (Houston, Texas)
- Michelle Box – A&R production
- Robby Klein – photography
- Beth Lee – art direction
- Tim Parker – art direction, design
- Jonathan Powell – wardrobe
- Kristopher Whipple – grooming
- Vasquez Entertainment – management

== Charts ==
Chart (2015)	Peak position
US Billboard 200	46
US Top Christian Albums (Billboard)	2
US Top Rock Albums (Billboard)	11
