= Space in Between Us =

Studio album by Building 429
- Released: July 27, 2004
- Studio: Lake Dog Studios and The Sound Kitchen (Franklin, Tennessee): Little Big Sound (Nashville, Tennessee)
- Genre: Christian rock
- Length: 47:38
- Label: Word
- Producer: Jim Cooper

Building 429 chronology
Glory Defined (2004)	Space in Between Us (2004)	Rise (2006)

Professional ratings
Review scores
Source	Rating
AllMusic	3.5/5 stars
Jesus Freak Hideout	3/5 stars

Space In Between Us is the third album by Christian rock band Building 429, released in 2004 (original) and 2005 (expanded edition) by Word Records. It is also the band's first full-length record on a national label. Radio singles from this recording include "Glory Defined", "Above it All", "Space in Between Us", and "No One Else Knows".

== Track listing ==
Album release
No.	Title	Writer(s)	Length
1.	"Glory Defined"	Jim Cooper, Kenny Lamb, Jason Roy	3:23
2.	"Above It All"	Roy	4:43
3.	"The Space in Between Us"	Cooper, Roy	4:11
4.	"One Time Too Many"	Cooper, Roy	3:45
5.	"Back to Me"	Cooper, Lamb, Roy	3:15
6.	"Shadow of Angels"	Roy	3:55
7.	"No One Else Knows"	Roy, Jason Ingram	4:42
8.	"Never Look Away"	Roy, Ingram	3:43
9.	"Angeline"	Roy	3:46
10.	"Show Me Love"	Roy	3:41
11.	"You Are Loved"	Roy, Ingram, Tyler Hayes-Bleck	3:25
12.	"Spirit Lives On"	Roy	5:09
Total length:			50:10

Expanded edition
No.	Title	Length
13.	"All You Ask of Me" (Unplugged)	3:54
14.	"Free"	4:01
15.	"Glory Defined" (Alternative Version)	3:30
16.	"No One Else Knows" (Radio Remix)	4:21
17.	"Famous One"	4:12

== Personnel ==
Building 429

- Jason Roy – lead vocals, acoustic piano, guitars
- Paul Bowden – guitars, backing vocals
- Scotty Beshears – bass, backing vocals
- Michael Anderson – drums

Additional musicians

- Jim Cooper
- Jason Burkum
- Tony Palacios
- Matt Pierson
- Aaron Blanton
- David Angell – strings
- Monisa Angell – strings
- David Davidson – strings, string arrangements

== Production ==
- Jim Cooper – producer, overdubbing
- Tony Palacios – recording, mixing
- Kenzi Butler – recording assistant
- Bobby Shin – string recording
- Tresa Jordan – editing
- Tom Baker – mastering at Precision Mastering, Hollywood, California
- Blaine Barcus – A&R direction
- Cheryl H. McTyre – A&R administration
- Mark Lusk – artist development
- Katherine Petillo – creative direction
- Jeremy Cowart – design, photography
