= Everglades Correctional Institution =

Prison in Miami-Dade County, Florida, United States

Coordinates: 25°44′58″N 80°29′41″W

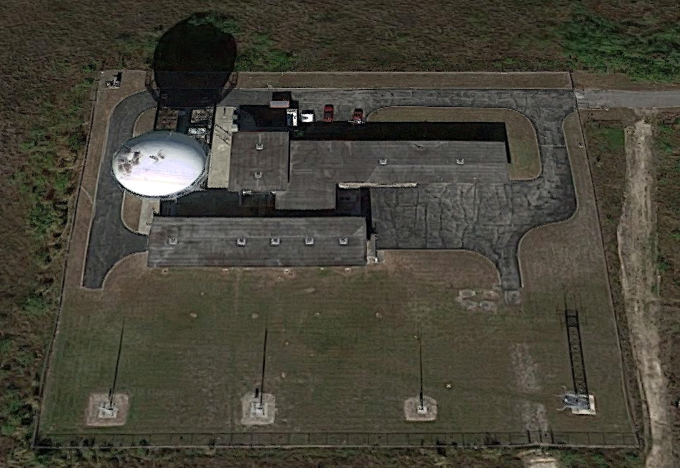
- Overhead image of Everglades Correctional Institution
- Interactive map of Everglades Correctional Institution
- Location: 1599 SW 187th Avenue Miami, Florida
- Status: Operational
- Security class: Minimum, medium, and close
- Capacity: 2,259 = 1,827 (main unit) + 432 (re-entry center)
- Population: 2,276 = 1,856 (main unit) + 420 (re-entry center) (January 9, 2024)
- Opened: 1995
- Managed by: Florida Department of Corrections
- Warden: Herman Rogers

The Everglades Correctional Institution (also ECI) is a state-operated prison for men in unincorporated Miami-Dade County, in the state of Florida. It was established in 1995 as a part of a larger push for more beds in Miami-Dade County.

In 2022, Maverick City Music and Kirk Franklin recorded the album Kingdom Book One at the facility, with 1,300 inmates participating in the recording. The album aimed to spotlight the injustices around mass incarceration in the United States.
