= Building 429 =

American Christian rock band

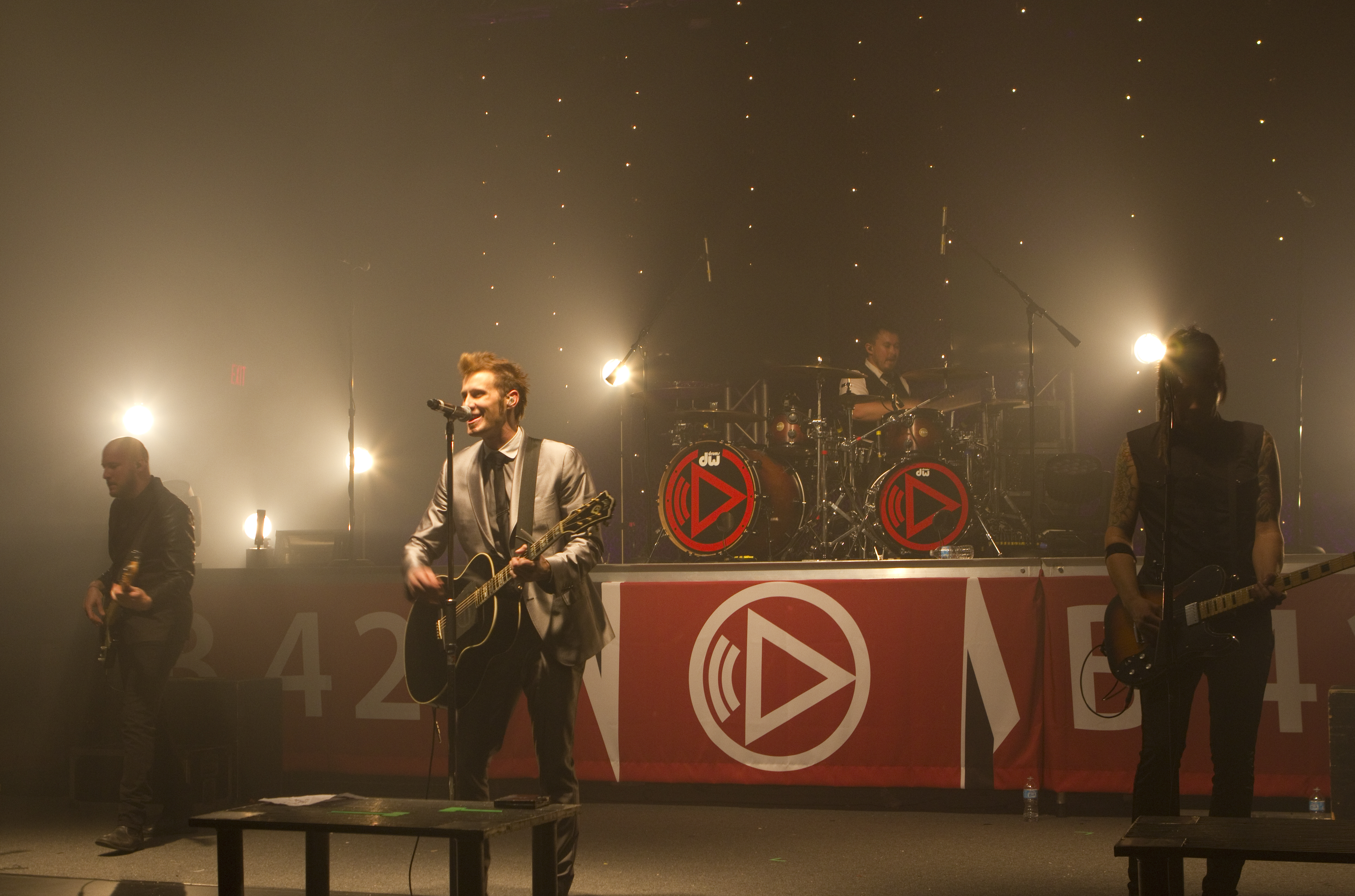
- Building 429 Performing in 2013

Background information
- Origin: Fayetteville, North Carolina, U.S.
- Genres: CCM, Christian rock
- Years active: 1999–present
- Labels: Essential; Word; INO; Provident; Reunion; 3rd Wave
- Website: building429.com

Building 429 is an American Christian rock band from Fayetteville, North Carolina. The band's name refers to Ephesians 4:29, a Biblical passage that (in the New International Version of the Bible) reads: "Do not let any unwholesome talk come out of your mouths, but only what is helpful for building others up according to their needs, that it may benefit those who listen."

Building 429 was named the Gospel Music Association 2005 New Artist of the Year. The band is known for its hit songs "Glory Defined" (2004) and "Where I Belong" (2012).

== History ==
In late 1999, bassist Scotty Beshears and guitarist/vocalist Jason Roy met in North Carolina at the final performance of Roy's band All Too Familiar. Beshears had formerly been involved with Elijah's Ride, another independent band. They teamed up with drummer Christian Fuhrer to form a new band which blended modern pop-rock music with Christian-themed lyrics. The trio began to perform under the name "Building 429".

According to Roy, the band's name originated from a youth group. Roy's wife Cortni had once belonged to a youth group that had a system called the "429 Challenge," based on Ephesians 4:29.

Throughout the year 2000, Building 429 held a relentless touring schedule, with over 100 shows played and 3,000 copies of their first (self-titled) CD sold.

"Glory Defined", Building 429's first nationally serviced radio single, rose to No. 1 on eight combined Christian AC and CHR charts in early 2004, remaining No. 1 on Christian Radio Weekly's (CRW) AC chart for ten consecutive weeks and claiming the spot faster than any single in the history of the publication. The song was the title track from the Glory Defined EP, released April 6, 2004. On July 27, 2004, Building 429's national debut, Space in Between, was released. Produced by Jim Cooper, the album gave three more radio hits: "Above It All", "The Space in Between Us" and "No One Else Knows".

Building 429 received four Dove Award nominations and was honored as New Artist of the Year in 2005. An expanded edition of Space in Between was released in August 2005, which included the full original album plus two tracks from the Glory Defined EP ("All You Ask of Me" and "Free"), the AC mix of "Glory Defined", a radio mix of "No One Else Knows" and a cover of Chris Tomlin's "Famous One".

Rise (released March 14, 2006) included the singles "Searching For a Savior", "Fearless" and "I Belong to You".

Building 429's third major studio release was entitled Iris to Iris.

On July 3, 2008, the band released Glory Defined: The Best of Building 429, a greatest hits collection from the albums under the Word Records label. The CD contained all previously released tracks.

A press release dated September 10, 2008 stated that Building 429 had moved to INO Records after almost five years with Word Records. The self-titled album Building 429 was released on October 21, 2008 to mark the "new beginning" of the band with the new label. "End of Me" was the first single from the new album to be released to Christian AC and CHR radio outlets, followed by "Always". Soul-Audio, a Christian music publication, granted the album an average score, speaking highly of the band by saying "Forget the future—the present is pretty bright for this trio."

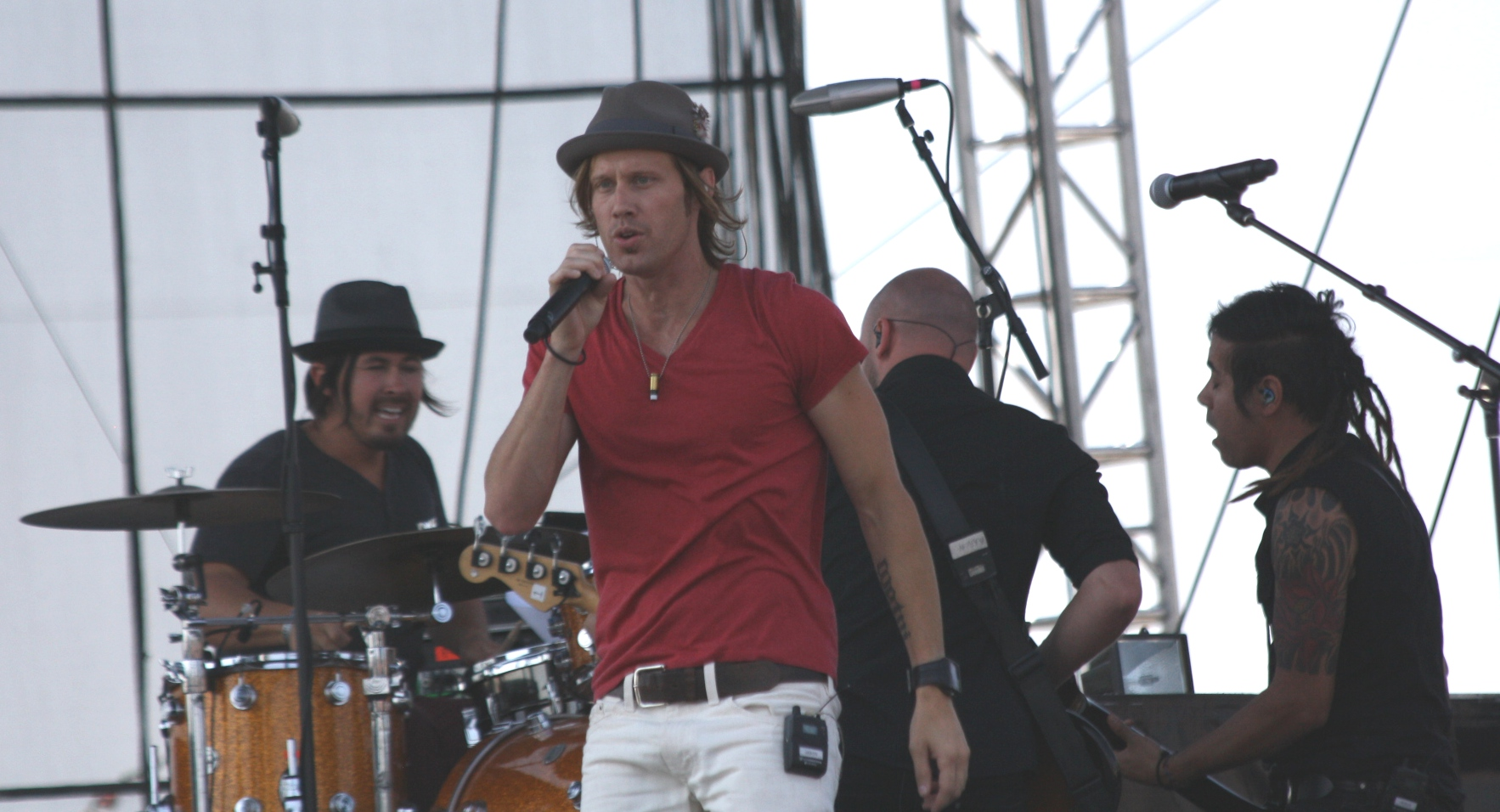
Building 429 performing in 2012

Building 429 started out with Essential Records by releasing Listen to the Sound. Throughout 2011 and 2012, Building 429 released new singles "Listen to the Sound", "Right Beside You" and "Where I Belong". The single "Where I Belong" was No. 1 on the Billboard NCA charts and was named the 2013 Billboard Magazine Christian Song of the Year. "Where I Belong" has been certified as a gold record.

On June 4, 2013, Building 429 released We Won't Be Shaken, their eighth studio album. The CD debuted at No. 1 on the Billboard Christian Albums chart.

== Discography ==
- 2004: Space in Between Us
- 2006: Rise
- 2007: Iris to Iris
- 2008: Building 429
- 2011: Listen to the Sound
- 2013: We Won't Be Shaken
- 2015: Unashamed
- 2018: Live the Journey

== Awards ==
In 2005, Building 429 was nominated for four Dove Awards at the 36th GMA Dove Awards. The band won the Dove Award for New Artist of the Year.

At the 56th Annual Grammy Awards, the band's We Won't Be Shaken album was nominated for "Best Contemporary Christian Music Album".

Awards
Preceded by Jeremy Camp	GMA's New Artist of the Year; 2005	Succeeded by The Afters
