= Maryanne J. George =

American Christian musician (born 1992)

- Born: Maryanne Joshua George; October 8, 1992 (age 33); Queens, New York, U.S.
- Origin: Queens, New York, U.S.
- Genres: Contemporary worship music
- Occupations: Singer; songwriter; musician
- Instruments: Vocals; piano; guitar; violin
- Years active: 2019–present
- Labels: Tribl
- Website: Official website

Maryanne Joshua George is a Grammy Award-winning American Christian musician and songwriter of Malayalee origin. George is also a former member of the Maverick City Music collective. George made her solo debut in 2021 with the release of her debut extended play, Not Just Stories, via Tribl Records. Not Just Stories debuted at number twelve on the Top Christian Albums Chart and number three on the Top Gospel Albums Chart in the United States.

== Career ==
Maryanne attended Herricks High School and was part of the graduating class of 2010. She then went on to graduate from the University of Missouri - St. Louis in December 2018, with her Masters of Education in Clinical Mental Health Counselor. She is board certified by the NCC (National Certified Counselor). In November 2019, Maryanne decided to pursue music full-time. In September 2021, Tribl Records announced that Maryanne J. George will be making her solo career with the release of an extended play titled Not Just Stories, slated for October 8, 2021. Not Just Stories was released on October 8, 2021. The album debuted at number twelve on the Top Christian Albums Chart and number three on the Top Gospel Albums Chart published by Billboard in the United States having sold 3,000 equivalent album units.

== Discography ==
=== EPs ===
List of EPs, with selected chart positions
Title	Album details	Peak chart positions		Sales
Title	Album details	US Christ.	US Gospel	Sales
Not Just Stories	Debut album; Released: October 8, 2021; Label: Tribl Records; Format: Digital download, streaming	12	3	US: 3,000
"—" denotes a recording that did not chart or was not released in that territory.

=== Singles ===
==== As lead artist ====
List of singles
Title	Year	Album
"Forever I Run"	2020	Non-album single

==== As featured artist ====
List of singles
Title	Year	Album
"O Come O Come Emmanuel" (IMMV Band featuring Maryanne Joshua George)	2019	Christmas Tringle (Single)

=== Promotional singles ===
List of promotional singles
Title	Year	Album
"Not Just Stories" (featuring Aaron Moses)	2021	Not Just Stories

=== Other charted songs ===
List of songs and peak chart positions
Title	Year	Peak positions		Album
Title	Year	US Christ	US Gospel	Album
"Champion" (Maverick City Music and Upperroom featuring Brandon Lake and Maryanne J. George)	2020	48	20	You Hold It All Together (EP)
"I Thank God" (Maverick City Music and Upperroom featuring Dante Bowe, Aaron Moses, Maryanne J. George and Chuck Butler)	2021	29	7	Move Your Heart (EP)
"Heal Our Land / Come & Move" (Maverick City Music featuring Joe L Barnes, Maryanne J. George and Mav City Gospel Choir)	2022	50	24	Breathe
"—" denotes a recording that did not chart.

=== Other appearances ===
List of other appearances
Title	Year	Album	Ref.
"Such an Awesome God" (Maverick City Music featuring Maryanne J. George)	2020	Maverick City Vol. 3 Part 1	
"Fresh Fire" (Housefires featuring Tony Brown and Maryanne J. George)	2020	Housefires + Friends	
"To You" (Maverick City Music featuring Chandler Moore and Maryanne J. George)	2020	Maverick City, Vol. 3 Pt. 2	
"Hymn of the Ages" (Maverick City Music featuring Maryanne J. George)	2020	Maverick City, Vol. 3 Pt. 2	
"Open Door" (Maverick City Music featuring Maryanne J. George and Nate Moore)	2020	Maverick City, Vol. 3 Pt. 2	
"Jesus at the Center / All Hail King Jesus" (Maverick City Music featuring Naomi Raine and Maryanne J. George)	2020	Maverick City Christmas (EP)	
"God of Israel" (Maverick City Music featuring Naomi Raine and Maryanne J. George)	2021	Jubilee	
"Mighty One" (Maverick City Music featuring Todd Dulaney, Maryanne J. George and Mav City Gospel Choir)	2021	Jubilee: Juneteenth Edition	
"Sufficient for Today" (Maverick City Music featuring Maryanne J. George & Mav City Gospel Choir)	2021	Jubilee: Juneteenth Edition	
"Melodies From Heaven" (Maverick City Music and Kirk Franklin featuring Chandler Moore and Maryanne J. George)	2022	Kingdom Book One	

== Awards and nominations ==
=== Grammy Awards ===
Year	Nominee / work	Award	Result	Ref.
2022	"Wait on You" (Note: George is credited as a member of Maverick City Music.) (Elevation Worship and Maverick City Music)	Best Gospel Performance/Song	Nominated	
2022	Jubilee: Juneteenth Edition	Best Gospel Album	Nominated	
2022	"Jireh" (Elevation Worship and Maverick City Music featuring Chandler Moore and Naomi Raine)	Best Contemporary Christian Music Performance/Song	Nominated	
2022	Old Church Basement	Best Contemporary Christian Music Album	Won	
2023	"Kingdom" (with Kirk Franklin)	Best Gospel Performance/Song	Won	
2023	Kingdom Book One (with Kirk Franklin)	Best Gospel Album	Won	
2023	"God Really Loves Us (Radio Version)" (Crowder featuring Dante Bowe and Maverick City Music)	Best Contemporary Christian Music Performance/Song	Nominated	
2023	"Fear Is Not My Future" (with Kirk Franklin)	Best Contemporary Christian Music Performance/Song	Won	
2023	Breathe	Best Contemporary Christian Music Album	Won	
