= Breathe (Maverick City Music EP) =

2021 EP by Maverick City Music

EP by Maverick City Music
- Released: February 11, 2022
- Recorded: 2021
- Label: Tribl
- Producer: Jonathan Jay; Tony Brown; Harold Brown

Maverick City Music EP chronology
Jubilee (2021)	Breathe (2022)	Love Made a Way (2025)

Maverick City Music chronology
A Very Maverick Christmas (2021)	Breathe (2022)	Tribl Nights Anthologies (2022)

Breathe is the seventh extended play by American contemporary worship music collective Maverick City Music, which was released via Tribl Records on February 11, 2022. The featured worship leaders on the EP are Joe L Barnes, Maryanne J. George, Dante Bowe, Chandler Moore, and Naomi Raine, backed by the Mav City Gospel Choir, with guest appearances from Jonathan McReynolds, Doe, Israel Houghton, Ahjah Walls, Katie Torwalt, and Todd Dulaney. The EP was produced by Jonathan Jay, Tony Brown, and Harold Brown.

Breathe debuted at number 16 on Billboard's Top Christian Albums Chart and at number four Top Gospel Albums Chart in the United States. It received a nomination for the Grammy Award for Best Contemporary Christian Music Album at the 2023 Grammy Awards.

== Background ==
On February 11, 2022, Maverick City Music released the EP Breathe without prior promotion, in commemoration of Black History Month 2022. The EP contains live and studio versions standout tracks "Breathe," "Joy of the Lord," and "Make It Right," which were taken Jubilee: Juneteenth Edition (2021), as well as three new original recordings.

== Accolades ==
Awards
Year	Organization	Award	Result	Ref
2023	Grammy Awards	Best Contemporary Christian Music Album	Won	

== Commercial performance ==
In the United States, Breathe debuted at number 16 on Top Christian Albums and number on Top Gospel Albums charts dated February 26, 2022.

== Track listing ==
Disc 1
No.	Title	Writer(s)	Length
1.	"Heal Our Land / Come & Move" (featuring Joe L Barnes, Maryanne J. George and Mav City Gospel Choir)	Alton Eugene; Chandler Moore; Dante Bowe; Jesse Cline; Joe L Barnes; Maryanne J. George; Omari Walthour; Travis Ryan	6:41
2.	"Breathe" (featuring Chandler Moore, Jonathan McReynolds, Doe and Mav City Gospel Choir; Live version)	Moore; Doe Jones; Jonathan McReynolds; Pat Barrett	8:04
3.	"Nothing Left to Prove" (featuring Israel Houghton, Naomi Raine and Mav City Gospel Choir)	Moore; Bowe; Israel Houghton; Kirby Kaple	10:39
4.	"I Will Exalt You (Spontaneous)" (featuring Ahjah Walls and Mav City Gospel Choir)	Brooke Ligertwood	6:24

Disc 2
No.	Title	Writer(s)	Length
1.	"Breathe" (featuring Chandler Moore, Jonathan McReynolds, Doe and Mav City Gospel Choir; Studio version)	Moore; Jones; McReynolds; Barrett	5:26
2.	"Joy of the Lord" (featuring Katie Torwalt, Naomi Raine, Dante Bowe and Mav City Gospel Choir)	Bowe; Kalley; Naomi Raine	3:28
3.	"Make It Right" (featuring Dante Bowe, Todd Dulaney and Mav City Gospel Choir)	Alton Eugene; Bowe; Mitch Wong; Todd Dulaney	3:45
4.	"Mighty One" (featuring Todd Dulaney, Maryanne J. George and Mav City Gospel Choir)	Bowe; Wong; Dulaney	4:51

== Charts ==
=== Weekly charts ===
Weekly chart performance for Breathe
Chart (2022)	Peak position
US Top Christian Albums (Billboard)	16
US Gospel Albums (Billboard)	4

=== Year-end charts ===
Year-end chart performance for A Very Maverick Christmas
Chart (2022)	Position
US Christian Albums (Billboard)	95
US Gospel Albums (Billboard)	26

== Release history ==
Release history and formats for Breathe
Region	Date	Format(s)	Label(s)	Ref.
Various	February 11, 2022	Digital download; streaming	Tribl Records	
