= Billboard Music Award for Top Gospel Artist =

Annual American music award

The Billboard Music Award for Top Gospel Artist winners and nominees. Kanye West had won the award the greatest number of time.

== Winners and nominees ==
Winners are listed first and highlighted in bold.

=== 2010s ===
Year	Artist	Ref.
2016	**Kirk Franklin**	
2016	Anthony Brown	
2016	Tasha Cobbs	
2016	Travis Greene	
2016	Marvin Sapp	
2017	**Kirk Franklin**	
2017	Hezekiah Walker	
2017	Jekalyn Carr	
2017	Tamela Mann	
2017	Travis Greene	
2018	**Tasha Cobbs Leonard**	
2018	Anthony Brown & Group TherAPy	
2018	Youthful Praise	
2018	Tamela Mann	
2018	Travis Greene	
2019	**Tasha Cobbs Leonard**	
2019	Kirk Franklin	
2019	Koryn Hawthorne	
2019	Tori Kelly	
2019	Marvin Sapp	

=== 2020s ===
Year	Artist	Ref.
2020	**Kanye West**	
2020	Kirk Franklin	
2020	Koryn Hawthorne	
2020	Tasha Cobbs Leonard	
2020	Sunday Service Choir	
2021	**Kanye West**	
2021	Kirk Franklin	
2021	Koryn Hawthorne	
2021	Tasha Cobbs Leonard	
2021	Maverick City Music	
2022	**Kanye West**	
2022	CeCe Winans	
2022	Elevation Worship	
2022	Kirk Franklin	
2022	Maverick City Music	
2023	**Kanye West**	
2023	CeCe Winans	
2023	Elevation Worship	
2023	Kirk Franklin	
2023	Maverick City Music	
2024	**CeCe Winans**	
2024	Kirk Franklin	
2024	Maverick City Music	
2024	Chandler Moore	
2024	Naomi Raine	
