= Love Made a Way =

EP by Maverick City Music and Dante Bowe
- Released: December 5, 2025
- Length: 31:21
- Label: Tribl
- Producers: Bowe; Jonathan Jay; Norman Gymafi; GRAHAM; Kirk Franklin; Brunes Charles

Maverick City Music EP chronology
Breathe (2022)	Love Made a Way (2025)

Maverick City Music chronology
A Very Very Maverick Christmas (2025)	Love Made a Way (2025)	I Was Made to Glorify Your Name (2026)

Dante Bowe chronology
Welcome Home (2025)	Love Made a Way (2025)	I Was Made to Glorify Your Name (2026)

Singles from Love Made a Way
- 1. "Constant" Released: November 15, 2024; 2. "All That I Need" Released: August 1, 2025; 3. "Lift Me Up" Released: October 3, 2025; 4. "Diamond (I See the Glory)" Released: October 24, 2025

Love Made a Way is a collaborative extended play (EP) recorded by American gospel collective Maverick City Music and Christian musician Dante Bowe. The EP was officially released on December 5, 2025, to digital download and streaming formats via Tribl Records. It was supported by the release of four singles—"Constant", "All That I Need", "Lift Me Up", and "Diamond (I See the Glory)".

The EP features guest appearances by Bear Bailey, GRAHAM, Jordin Sparks, Anthony Gargiula, Chandler Moore, and Mara Justine. It was produced by Bowe, Jonathan Jay, Norman Gyamfi, GRAHAM, Kirk Franklin, Brunes Charles. It features writing credits by Bowe, Jay, Naomi Raine, Sam McCabe, Ethan Hulse, GRAHAM, Anthony Gargiula, Jordan Sapp, Sparks, Norman Gyamfi, Wes Harris, and Mitch Wong.

== Release and promotion ==
The lead single from Love Made a Way, titled "Constant", was released as a single on November 15, 2024. "Constant" featured a guest appearance from Sparks, Gargiula, and Moore. CCM Magazine wrote of the song, observing that it "speaks to the essence of faith and trust in God, even through life’s storms" and "captures the vulnerability of doubt and struggle, powerfully affirming God’s unwavering presence". Lindsay Williams of Air1 noted that it is composed using the style of an "inspirational piano ballad", and is "rooted in storm and sea imagery". It was promoted with a music video, which was uploaded to YouTube. The song was written by Gargiula, Moore, Bowe, Jay, Sapp, Sparks, Gyamfi, and Harris, while Jay, Franklin, and Gyamfi produced. A live recording of the song was later featured on the collective's 2025 live album, Live at Maverick City.

Following the release of "Constant", the EP's second single, titled "All That I Need", was released on August 1, 2025. The song featured GRAHAM. It was written by Bowe, Hulse, GRAHAM, and Jay, while Bowe, GRAHAM, Jay, and Gyamfi produced. The song was accompanied by a lyric video, which was uploaded to YouTube. The album's third single, "Lift Me Up", was released on October 3, 2025, and featured Bowe and GRAHAM. The song's lyrics demonstrate that "no matter how heavy life gets, God is always there to lift us up and carry us through." It was written by Hulse, GRAHAM, and Jay, and produced by GRAHAM and Jay. On October 25, 2025, the extended play's fourth and final single was released, titled "Diamond (I See the Glory)". It featured Sparks and Justine. Maverick City Music spoke of the song, saying:

Together, we raise our voices high, declaring the goodness of God's, the unshakeable hope we have in Christ, and the sense of belonging we have in God's Kingdom.

The song was supported by a music video, which was uploaded to YouTube. It was written by Bowe, Jay, Sparks, and Wong, and produced by Charles, Jay, and Gyamfi. The EP itself was released on December 5, 2025. The title track and the song "Praise You Through It" were each supported with a music video, which were released to YouTube.

== Commercial performance ==
=== Extended play ===
Within its first charting week, Love Made a Way peaked at No. 39 on the Billboard Top Christian Albums chart and No. 6 on the Top Gospel Albums chart.

=== Singles and charted songs ===
"Constant" reached No. 10 on the Billboard Hot Christian Songs chart and No. 18 on the Christian Streaming Songs chart. It peaked at No. 2 on the Hot Gospel Songs chart, No. 1 on the Gospel Streaming Songs, No. 2 on the Gospel Digital Song Sales, and No. 1 the Gospel Airplay chart, where it led for two weeks. "All That I Need" peaked at No. 26 on the Hot Christian Songs chart, No. 3 on the Hot Gospel Songs chart, No. 7 on the Gospel Streaming Songs chart, and No. 7 on the Gospel Digital Song Sales chart. "Lift Me Up" peaked at No. 8 on the Gospel Digital Song Sales chart. "Diamond (I See the Glory)" peaked at No. 15 on the Hot Gospel Songs chart.

Two of the EP's tracks, "Praise You Through It" and "Love Made a Way", charted at Nos. 12 and 14 on the Hot Gospel Songs chart, respectively, with the release of the EP.

On the Billboard year-end charts of 2025, "Constant" was positioned at No. 3 on the Hot Gospel Songs chart, and "All That I Need" at No. 17. "Constant" placed at No. 29 on the Gospel Airplay chart, No. 11 on the Gospel Digital Song Sales chart, No. 9 on the Gospel Streaming Songs chart, and No. 33 on the Hot Christian Songs chart. "All That I Need" placed at No. 24 on the Gospel Streaming Songs chart.

== Track listing ==
Love Made a Way track listing
No.	Title	Writer(s)	Producer(s)	Length
1.	"Love Made a Way"	Dante Bowe; Jonathan Jay	Dante Bowe; Jonathan Jay; Norman Gyamfi	8:52
2.	"Praise You Through It" (featuring Bear Bailey)	Blake Wiggins; Brunes Charles; Chandler Moore; Dante Bowe; Naomi Raine; Sam McCabe	Dante Bowe; Jonathan Jay; Norman Gyamfi	6:19
3.	"All That I Need" (featuring GRAHAM)	Dante Bowe; Ethan Hulse; GRAHAM; Jonathan Jay	Dante Bowe; GRAHAM; Jonathan Jay; Norman Gyamfi	3:04
4.	"Constant" (featuring Jordin Sparks, Anthony Gargiula, and Chandler Moore)	Anthony Gargiula; Chandler Moore; Dante Bowe; Jonathan Jay; Jordan Sapp; Jordin Sparks; Norman Gyamfi; Wes Harris	Jonathan Jay; Kirk Franklin; Norman Gyamfi	4:52
5.	"Lift Me Up" (featuring GRAHAM)	Ethan Hulse; GRAHAM; Jonathan Jay	GRAHAM; Jonathan Jay	2:39
6.	"Diamond (I See the Glory)" (featuring Jordin Sparks, and Mara Justine)	Dante Bowe; Jonathan Jay; Jordin Sparks; Mitch Wong	Brunes Charles; Jonathan Jay; Norman Gyamfi	5:44
Total length:				31:21

Love Made a Way — Apple Music bonus music video content
No.	Title	Length
7.	"Love Made a Way" (video)	8:53
8.	"Praise You Through It" (video)	6:19
9.	"Constant" (video)	4:52
10.	"Diamond (I See the Glory)" (video)	5:42
Total length:		57:06

== Personnel ==
Credits adapted from Tidal Music.

=== Musicians ===
- Anthony Gargiula – lead vocals (4)
- Ava Garrett – background vocals (1)
- Bear Bailey – lead vocals (2)
- Brandon Bailey – bass guitar (1–2)
- Cameron Smith – background vocals (3)
- Chandler Moore – lead vocals (4)
- CiCi Doty-Townsend – background vocals (1)
- Crystal Davis – background vocals (2)
- Dante Bowe – lead vocals
- Emily Dickey – background vocals (1)
- Ethan Kent – background vocals (2–3)
- Gadiel Elias – acoustic guitar (1–2)
- GRAHAM – lead vocals (3, 5)
- J. Dylan Gibson – background vocals (1)
- Jacob Mendoza – drums (1–2)
- Jason Avila – keyboard (1), piano (2)
- John Martin II – background vocals (1)
- Jordin Sparks – lead vocals (4, 6)
- Katie Lewis – background vocals (1)
- Kevin Arellano – electric guitar (1–2)
- Landon Greenup – background vocals (2)
- LaNesha Creeks – background vocals (3)
- Lizzy Sangua – background vocals (1)
- Mara Justine – lead vocals (6)
- Nikki Sanford – background vocals (3)
- Ryan Brockington – background vocals (3)
- Tamesha Pearson – background vocals (2)
- Yemi LeKuti – background vocals (1)

=== Technical ===
- Alex Slaughter – masterer (1)
- Alex Dobbert – masterer (2, 4)
- Anthony Gargiula – writer (4)
- Blake Wiggins – writer (2)
- Brunes Charles – writer (2), producer (6)
- Chandler Moore – writer (2, 4)
- Dante Bowe – producer (1–3), writer (1–3, 5–6)
- Doug Weier – mixer (4), surround mixing engineer (4)
- Ethan Hulse – writer (3, 5)
- Ethan Kent – vocal engineer (1–4)
- GRAHAM – producer (3, 5), writer (3, 5), mixer (5)
- Jerrid Fletcher – production manager (4)
- Jonathan Jay – producer, writer (1, 3–6)
- Jordan Sapp – writer (4)
- Jordin Sparks – writer (4, 6)
- Kirk Franklin – producer (4)
- Michael Havens – tracking (4)
- Mitch Wong – writer (6)
- Naomi Raine – writer (2)
- Norman Gyamfi – producer (1–4, 6), writer (4)
- Sam McCabe – writer (2)
- Wes Harris – writer (4)
- Zach Schossau – mixer (1–2), pre-production engineer (4), masterer (5)

== Charts ==
Chart performance for Love Made a Way
Chart (2025)	Peak position
US Top Christian Albums (Billboard)	39
US Top Gospel Albums (Billboard)	6

== Release history ==
Release history and formats for Love Made a Way
Region	Date	Format(s)	Label(s)	Ref.
Various	December 5, 2025	Digital download; streaming	Tribl Records	
