= Promises (Maverick City Music song) =

2020 song by Maverick City Music

Single by Maverick City Music featuring Joe L. Barnes and Naomi Raine

from the album Maverick City Vol. 3 Part 1
- Released: May 3, 2021
- Studio: 1971 Sounds, Atlanta, Georgia, U.S.
- Genre: Contemporary worship music; contemporary gospel
- Length: 4:09
- Label: Maverick City Music
- Songwriters: Aaron Moses; Dante Bowe; Joe L. Barnes; Keila Alvarado; Lemuel Marin; Phillip Carrington Gaines
- Producers: Jonathan Jay; Tony Brown

Maverick City Music singles chronology
"Acercame" (2021)	"Promises" (2021)	"Breathe" (2021)

Joe L. Barnes singles chronology
"You Are Here" (2020)	"Promises" (2021)	"Come Back Home" (2021)

Naomi Raine singles chronology
"Find My Peace" (2021)	"Promises" (2021)	"Welcome Home" (2021)

Music video
- "Promises" on YouTube

"Promises" is a song performed by American contemporary worship collective Maverick City Music featuring Joe L. Barnes and Naomi Raine. The song was released on May 3, 2021, as the second single to their debut live album, Maverick City Vol. 3 Part 1 (2020). The song was written by Aaron Moses, Dante Bowe, Joe L. Barnes, Keila Alvarado, Lemuel Marin, and Phillip Carrington Gaines.

"Promises" peaked at number one on the US Hot Christian Songs chart, and on the Hot Gospel Songs chart, and number eleven on the Bubbling Under Hot 100 chart. The song was ranked by Billboard as the third biggest gospel song in 2022. It has been certified platinum by Recording Industry Association of America (RIAA). The song was nominated for the GMA Dove Award for Gospel Worship Recorded Song of the Year at the 2020 GMA Dove Awards. At the 2022 GMA Dove Awards, the song also received a GMA Dove Award nomination for Song of the Year.

== Background ==
On April 10, 2020, Maverick City Music released the official music video for "Promises" featuring Joe L Barnes and Naomi Raine on YouTube in the lead-up to the release of their debut album, Maverick City Vol. 3 Part 1 on April 17, 2020. On May 3, 2021, Maverick City Music released the radio-adapted version of the song, featuring Joe L Barnes and Naomi Raine. The song is slated to impact Christian radio in the United States on May 28, 2021.

== Composition ==
"Promises" is composed in the key of B♭ with a tempo of 172 beats per minute and a musical time signature of 6/8.

== Accolades ==
Awards
Year	Organization	Award	Result	Ref
2020	GMA Dove Awards	Gospel Worship Recorded Song of the Year	Nominated	
2022	GMA Dove Awards	Song of the Year	Nominated	

== Commercial performance ==
Following the release of the radio version, "Promises" debuted at number 26 on the US Hot Christian Songs, and number eight on the Hot Gospel Songs charts dated May 22, 2021. The song reached number one on both the Hot Christian Songs and the Hot Gospel Songs charts dated January 15, 2022, thus ending Kanye West's eighteen week reign on the religious charts, split between "Hurricane" spending twelve weeks at number one, followed by "Praise God" which stayed on top of the charts for six weeks.

== Music video ==
The official music video for the "Promises" featuring Joe L Barnes and Naomi Raine was premiered on YouTube via Tribl, April 10, 2020. This video was recorded at 1971 Sounds in Atlanta with the Maverick City Music Choir as part of a song-sharing and recording session for Maverick City Vol. 3 Part 1.

== Charts ==
=== Weekly charts ===
Weekly chart performance for "Promises"
Chart (2021)	Peak position
US Bubbling Under Hot 100 (Billboard)	11
US Hot Christian Songs (Billboard)	1
US Christian Airplay (Billboard)	1
US Christian AC (Billboard)	3
US Gospel Songs (Billboard)	1

=== Year-end charts ===
Year-end chart performance for "Promises"
Chart (2021)	Position
US Christian Songs (Billboard)	35
US Christian Airplay (Billboard)	35
US Christian AC (Billboard)	31
US Gospel Songs (Billboard)	11
Chart (2022)	Position
US Christian Songs (Billboard)	3
US Christian Airplay (Billboard)	30
US Christian AC (Billboard)	35
US Gospel Songs (Billboard)	3
Chart (2023)	Position
US Christian Streamings Songs (Billboard)	23
US Gospel Songs (Billboard)	41

== Certifications ==
Region	Certification	Certified units/sales
New Zealand (RMNZ)	Gold	15,000^{‡}
United States (RIAA)	Platinum	1,000,000^{‡}
^{‡} Sales+streaming figures based on certification alone.

== Release history ==
Region	Date	Format	Label	Ref.
Various	May 3, 2021	Digital download; streaming	Maverick City Music	
United States	May 28, 2021	Christian radio	Maverick City Music	

== Other versions ==
- Shane & Shane released their own rendition of the song on their album, The Worship Initiative, Vol. 22 (2020).
- North Point Worship released a cover of "Promises" featuring Chris Cauley, Desi Raines, and Lauren Lee, on their extended play, Live From Decatur City (2021).
