= Maverick City, Vol. 3 Pt. 2 =

2020 live album by Maverick City Music

Live album by Maverick City Music
- Released: October 9, 2020
- Studio: 1971 Sounds, Atlanta, Georgia, U.S.
- Genre: Contemporary worship music; contemporary gospel
- Length: 124:34
- Label: Maverick City Music
- Producer: Jonathan Jay; Tony Brown

Maverick City Music chronology
| Maverick City Vol. 3 Part 1 (2020) | Maverick City, Vol. 3 Pt. 2 (2020) | You Hold It All Together (2020) |

Maverick City, Vol. 3 Pt. 2 is the second live album by American contemporary worship music collective Maverick City Music, which was released on October 9, 2020. The featured worship leaders on the album are Amanda Lindsey Cook, Naomi Raine, Aaron Moses, Chandler Moore, Maryanne J. George, Osby Berry, Brandon Lake, and Nate Moore. The album was produced by Jonathan Jay and Tony Brown.

Maverick City Vol. 3 Pt. 2 achieved commercial success upon its release, the album having debuted at No. 4 on Billboard's Top Christian Albums Chart and No. 2 on Top Gospel Albums Chart in the United States, and No. 8 on the Official Christian & Gospel Albums Chart in the United Kingdom. It was also nominated for the Billboard Music Award for Top Gospel Album at the 2021 Billboard Music Awards.

== Release and promotion ==
On June 19, 2020, Maverick City Music released the official music video of "The Story I'll Tell" featuring Naomi Raine, indicating that the song is one of the tracks to be released on Maverick City Vol. 3 Pt. 2. On September 24, 2020, Maverick City Music released the official music video of "Be Praised" featuring Naomi Raine and Aaron Moses, also announcing that the release date for the album is slated for October 9, 2020. Maverick City Vol. 3 Pt. 2 was released on October 9, 2020, with the official music video for "To You" featuring Chandler Moore and Maryanne Joshua George also being released on the same day.

== Reception ==
=== Accolades ===
Awards
| Year | Organization | Award | Result | Ref |
|---|---|---|---|---|
| 2021 | Billboard Music Awards | Top Gospel Album | Nominated | |

== Commercial performance ==
In the United States, the album debuted at number four on Top Christian Albums Chart, and number two on Top Gospel Albums Chart.

In the United Kingdom, Maverick City Vol. 3 Pt. 2 debuted on the OCC's Official Christian & Gospel Albums Chart at No. 8.

== Track listing ==
Maverick City, Vol. 3 Pt. 2
| No. | Title | Writer(s) | Length |
|---|---|---|---|
| 1. | "Temple (Spontaneous)" (featuring Amanda Lindsey Cook) | Amanda Lindsey Cook | 12:01 |
| 2. | "Be Praised" (featuring Naomi Raine and Aaron Moses) | Aaron Moses; Dante Bowe; Joe L Barnes | 7:51 |
| 3. | "To You" (featuring Chandler Moore and Maryanne J. George) | Maryanne Joshua George; Davy Flowers | 13:46 |
| 4. | "The Story I'll Tell" (featuring Naomi Raine) | Naomi Raine; Benji Cowart; Alton Eugene | 7:15 |
| 5. | "Yahweh" (featuring Chandler Moore and Osby Berry) | Moses; Bowe; Kierre Lindsay | 5:12 |
| 6. | "Most High (Spontaneous)" (featuring Chandler Moore) | Jumbo Aniebiet | 3:35 |
| 7. | "Never Leave" (featuring Naomi Raine) | Eugene; Nate Moore; Chandler Moore; Chris House | 8:03 |
| 8. | "Hymn of the Ages" (featuring Maryanne J. George) | George; Stephen Carswell; Julissa Leilani; Cowart | 8:10 |
| 9. | "Fresh Fire" (featuring Naomi Raine and Brandon Lake) | Brandon Lake; Tony Brown; Jonathan Jay; Bowe; Paul McClure; Hannah McClure | 7:26 |
| 10. | "Open Door" (featuring Maryanne J. George and Nate Moore) | Jay; Mia Fieldes | 8:13 |
| 11. | "God of Midnight" (featuring Aaron Moses) | Aaron Moses | 5:39 |
| 12. | "Isaiah Song" (featuring Chandler Moore) | C. Moore; Leamond Sloan; Benita Jones | 12:11 |
| 13. | "Yes & Amen" (featuring Chandler Moore) | Brown; N. Moore | 8:33 |
| 14. | "Put on Love" (featuring Nate Moore and Osby Berry) | N. Moore; Ben Smith | 8:30 |
| 15. | "Closer" (featuring Brandon Lake) | Brandon Lake | 6:40 |
| Total length: | | | 124:34 |

== Charts ==
=== Weekly charts ===
Weekly chart performance for Maverick City Vol. 3 Pt. 2
| Chart (2020) | Peak position |
|---|---|
| UK Christian & Gospel Albums (OCC) | 8 |
| US Christian Albums (Billboard) | 4 |
| US Gospel Albums (Billboard) | 2 |
| US Top Album Sales (Billboard) | 99 |

=== Year-end charts ===
Year-end chart performance for Maverick City Vol. 3 Pt. 2
| Chart (2020) | Position |
|---|---|
| US Christian Albums (Billboard) | 81 |
| US Gospel Albums (Billboard) | 38 |
| Chart (2021) | Position |
| US Gospel Albums (Billboard) | 12 |
| Chart (2022) | Position |
| US Gospel Albums (Billboard) | 21 |
| Chart (2023) | Position |
| US Gospel Albums (Billboard) | 46 |

== Release history ==
| Region | Date | Format(s) | Label(s) | Ref. |
|---|---|---|---|---|
| Various | October 9, 2020 | Digital download; streaming | Maverick City Music | |
