= Maverick City Vol. 3 Part 1 =

2020 live album by Maverick City Music

Live album by Maverick City Music
- Released: April 17, 2020
- Studio: 1971 Sounds, Atlanta, Georgia, U.S.
- Genre: Contemporary worship music; contemporary gospel
- Length: 93:32
- Label: Maverick City Music
- Producer: Jonathan Jay; Tony Brown

Maverick City Music chronology
Maverick City Vol. 2 (2019)	Maverick City Vol. 3 Part 1 (2020)	Maverick City, Vol. 3 Pt. 2 (2020)

Singles from Maverick City Vol. 3 Part 1
- 1. "Man of Your Word" Released: August 21, 2020; 2. "Promises" Released: May 3, 2021

Maverick City Vol. 3 Part 1 is the debut live album by American contemporary worship music collective Maverick City Music, which was released independently on April 17, 2020. The featured worship leaders on the album are Chandler Moore, Bri Babineaux, Majesty Rose, KJ Scriven, Amanda Lindsey Cook, Joe L Barnes, Naomi Raine, Alton Eugene, Steffany Gretzinger, Maryanne J. George, and Chris Brown of Elevation Worship.

The album was supported by the release of "Man of Your Word" and "Promises" as singles. "Man of Your Word" went on to become the collective's breakthrough hit, peaking at number 18 on the Hot Christian Songs chart. "Promises" also became a hit single, reaching number one on the Hot Christian Songs and Hot Gospel Songs charts, and peaking at number 11 on the Bubbling Under Hot 100 chart. Maverick City Vol. 3 Part 1 achieved commercial success in the United States, the album having debuted at number six on Billboard's Top Christian Albums Chart and number two on the Top Gospel Albums Chart. Maverick City Vol. 3 Part 1 was nominated for the GMA Dove Award for Gospel Worship Album of the Year at the 2020 GMA Dove Awards. The album won the Billboard Music Award for Top Gospel Album at the 2021 Billboard Music Awards.

== Singles ==
Maverick City Music released the song "Man of Your Word" which features Chandler Moore and KJ Scriven, to Christian radio stations in the United States on August 21, 2020, being their debut radio single. "Man of Your Word" peaked at number 18 on the Hot Christian Songs chart, and spent a total of twenty-six non-consecutive weeks on the chart.

On May 3, 2021, Maverick City Music released the radio version of "Promises" featuring Joe L Barnes and Naomi Raine as the second single from the album. The song reached number one on both the Hot Christian Songs and the Hot Gospel Songs charts.

== Reception ==
=== Critical response ===
NewReleaseToday's Jasmin Patterson praised the album, applauding the collective for "authentic passion and unique sound that is so refreshing to worship music."

=== Accolades ===
Awards
Year	Organization	Award	Result	Ref
2020	GMA Dove Awards	Gospel Worship Album of the Year	Nominated	
2021	Billboard Music Awards	Top Gospel Album	Won	

== Commercial performance ==
In the United States, the album debuted at number six on Top Christian Albums Chart, and number two on Top Gospel Albums Chart.

In the United Kingdom, Maverick City Vol. 3 Part 1 debuted on the OCC's Official Christian & Gospel Albums Chart at number 15.

== Track listing ==
Maverick City Vol. 3 Part 1
No.	Title	Writer(s)	Length
1.	"Fill the Room" (featuring Chandler Moore)	Chandler Moore	8:34
2.	"Love Is a Miracle" (featuring Bri Babineaux and Majesty Rose)	Majesty Rose; Kierre Bjorn Lindsay; Dante Bowe	7:30
3.	"Man of Your Word" (featuring Chandler Moore and KJ Scriven)	Moore; Tony Brown; Jonathan Jay; Nathan Jess	9:02
4.	"Lean Back" (featuring Amanda Lindsey Cook and Chandler Moore)	Amanda Lindsey Cook; Brown; Nate Moore; Chris McClarney	15:45
5.	"Promises" (featuring Joe L Barnes and Naomi Raine)	Joe L Barnes; Aaron Moses; Carrington Gaines; Keila Alvarado; Lemuel Marín; Bowe	10:46
6.	"Holy Ghost" (featuring Bri Babineaux and Alton Eugene)	Bri Babineaux; Brown; Jay; Brandon Lake; Bowe	5:16
7.	"Thank You" (featuring Steffany Gretzinger and Chandler Moore)	Steffany Gretzinger; Moore; Bowe	7:29
8.	"Such an Awesome God" (featuring Maryanne J. George)	Jay; Mitch Wong; Heath Balltzglier; Johnny Hamilton	7:12
9.	"Have My Heart" (featuring Chris Brown and Chandler Moore)	Moore; Steven Furtick; Tiffany Hammer; Lake	12:46
10.	"Closer" (featuring Amanda Lindsey Cook)	Cook	2:40
11.	"My Heart Your Home" (featuring Alton Eugene and Chandler Moore)	Alton Eugene; Moore; Chris House; Nate Moore	6:32
Total length:			93:32

== Charts ==
=== Weekly charts ===
Weekly chart performance for Maverick City Vol. 3 Part 1
Chart (2020)	Peak position
UK Christian & Gospel Albums (OCC)	15
US Top Christian Albums (Billboard)	6
US Gospel Albums (Billboard)	2
US Top Album Sales (Billboard)	64

=== Year-end charts ===
Year-end chart performance for Maverick City Vol. 3 Part 1
Chart (2020)	Position
US Christian Albums (Billboard)	43
US Gospel Albums (Billboard)	4
Chart (2021)	Position
US Christian Albums (Billboard)	22
US Gospel Albums (Billboard)	4
Chart (2022)	Position
US Christian Albums (Billboard)	18
US Gospel Albums (Billboard)	4
Chart (2023)	Position
US Christian Albums (Billboard)	49
US Gospel Albums (Billboard)	6
Chart (2025)	Position
US Gospel Albums (Billboard)	43

== Release history ==
Region	Date	Format(s)	Label(s)	Ref.
Various	April 17, 2020	Digital download; streaming	Maverick City Music	
