= Jubilee: Juneteenth Edition =

2021 live album by Maverick City Music

Live album by Maverick City Music
- Released: June 18, 2021
- Recorded: May 2021
- Genre: Contemporary gospel; rap; R&B; pop
- Label: Tribl
- Producer: Aaron Moses; Brandon Lake; Chandler Moore; Jonathan Jay; Tony Brown; Harold Brown; Jeff Schneeweis; Alton Eugene; Naomi Raine; Montell Fish; Phil “Phillionaire” Thornton

Maverick City Music chronology
Old Church Basement (2021)	Jubilee: Juneteenth Edition (2021)	Tribl I (2021)

Singles from Jubilee: Juneteenth Edition
- 1. "Breathe" Released: June 4, 2021

Jubilee: Juneteenth Edition is the fifth live album by American contemporary worship music collective Maverick City Music, which was released via Tribl Records on June 18, 2021.

The album is a dual-side feature consisting of a live produced gospel A-Side titled Breathe and a rap/R&B/pop produced B-Side titled Same Blood. Side A contains guest appearances by Lecrae, Dante Bowe, Todd Dulaney, Jekalyn Carr, Mav City Gospel Choir, Chandler Moore, Jonathan McReynolds, Doe, Maryanne J. George, Naomi Raine, Israel Houghton, Ryan Ofei, Bri Babineaux, and Katie Torwalt. Side B contains guest appearances by Lecrae, Joe L Barnes, Koryn Hawthorne, Harolddd, Tamar Braxton, Eugene Kiing, Ciara, Rapsody, Naomi Raine, Dante Bowe, Montell Fish, and Chandler Moore.

The album was supported by the release of "Breathe" as a single. "Breathe" peaked at number 31 on the US Hot Christian Songs chart and at number ten the Hot Gospel Songs chart.

Jubilee: Juneteenth Edition became a commercially successful album upon its release, debuting at number eight on Billboard's Top Christian Albums Chart and at number two Top Gospel Albums Chart in the United States, as well as number ten on the Official Charts' Official Christian & Gospel Albums Chart in the United Kingdom. Jubilee: Juneteenth Edition was nominated for the Grammy Award for Best Gospel Album at the 2022 Grammy Awards. It was also nominated for the Billboard Music Award for Top Gospel Album at the 2022 Billboard Music Awards. At the 2022 GMA Dove Awards, Jubilee: Juneteenth Edition was nominated for the GMA Dove Award for Contemporary Gospel Album of the Year, while "Breathe" won the GMA Dove Award for Gospel Worship Recorded Song of the Year.

== Background ==
On June 2, 2021, Maverick City Music announced that they were preparing for the release of their following project, Jubilee: Juneteenth Edition. The album follows their commercially collaborative album with Elevation Worship, Old Church Basement (2021). Jubilee: Juneteenth Edition was released on June 18, 2021, in celebration of Juneteenth, which became an official federal holiday in the United States.

The creative process of the album began with Jubilee (2021), which had been written during the 2020 Black Lives Matter protests. Naomi Raine expressed that from there, they had an intention of releasing a Juneteenth Edition, saying "We were actually getting to speak from a more sober place. Not in the middle of a lot of tragedy."

== Music and lyrics ==
The album is a dual-side feature consisting of a live produced gospel A-Side titled Breathe and a rap/R&B/pop produced B-Side titled Same Blood.

== Release and promotion ==
Maverick City Music released "Breathe" on June 4, 2021, as the lead single from the album, exclusively on Apple Music. Apple Music selected the song as part of its specially curated playlist of songs to honor Juneteenth 2021 titled Juneteenth 2021: Freedom Songs. "Breathe" won the GMA Dove Award for Gospel Worship Recorded Song of the Year at the 2022 GMA Dove Awards.

== Reception ==
=== Critical response ===
Professional ratings
Review scores
Source	Rating
Louder Than The Music	5/5

Reviewing for Louder Than The Music, Jono Davies gave a positive review of the album, saying: "The beauty of music is that it can speak to us no matter how we are feeling, some albums can speak to us if we are in the best place or not such a great place, some albums can encourage us to worship, some encourage us to jump up and down, some encourage us to step out to change the world, some deal with injustice, some albums change us, some albums change our soul and our heart and I don't think I'm wrong in saying this, but this album does all of that. The album really takes you on a journey, emotionally and musically."

=== Accolades ===
Awards
Year	Organization	Award	Result	Ref
2022	Billboard Music Awards	Top Gospel Album	Nominated	
2022	Grammy Awards	Best Gospel Album	Nominated	
2022	GMA Dove Awards	Contemporary Gospel Album of the Year	Nominated	

== Commercial performance ==
In the United States, Jubilee: Juneteenth Edition earned 3,000 equivalent album units in its first week of sales, and as a result debuted at number eight on the Top Christian Albums Chart and at number two the Top Gospel Albums Chart dated June 24, 2021.

== Track listing ==
All the tracks on Side A: Breathe were produced by Aaron Moses, Brandon Lake, Chandler Moore, Jonathan Jay, and Tony Brown.

Side A: Breathe
No.	Title	Writer(s)	Length
1.	"Side A: Juneteenth Intro" (featuring Lecrae)	Lecrae	2:38
2.	"Make It Right" (featuring Dante Bowe, Todd Dulaney, Jekalyn Carr and Mav City Gospel Choir)	Dante Bowe; Mitch Wong; Todd Dulaney	8:42
3.	"Breathe" (featuring Chandler Moore, Jonathan McReynolds, Doe and Mav City Gospel Choir)	Chandler Moore; Doe Jones; Jonathan McReynolds; Pat Barrett	8:01
4.	"Mighty One" (featuring Todd Dulaney, Maryanne J. George and Mav City Gospel Choir)	Bowe; Wong; Dulaney	6:15
5.	"Jireh" (featuring Chandler Moore, Naomi Raine and Mav City Gospel Choir)	C. Moore; Chris Brown; Naomi Raine; Steven Furtick	6:00
6.	"Freedom Looks Good on You" (featuring Israel Houghton, Ryan Ofei, Bri Babineaux and Mav City Gospel Choir)	C. Moore; Israel Houghton; Pat Barrett; Ryan Ofei	9:08
7.	"Keep Praying" (featuring Doe, Ryan Ofei and Mav City Gospel Choir)	Aaron Moses; Brandon Lake; Doe Jones; Ryan Ofei	7:37
8.	"Son of Suffering" (featuring Jekalyn Carr, Chandler Moore and Mav City Gospel Choir)	Moses; David Funk; Matt Redman; Nate Moore	5:52
9.	"Joy of the Lord" (featuring Dante Bowe, Naomi Raine, Katie Torwalt and Mav City Gospel Choir)	Bowe; Kalley Heiligenthal; Raine	14:22
10.	"God Will Work It Out" (featuring Naomi Raine, Israel Houghton and Mav City Gospel Choir)	Moses; Adale Jackson; Chris Cleveland; Houghton; Raine; N. Moore	8:12
11.	"Sufficient for Today" (featuring Maryanne J. George and Mav City Gospel Choir)	Bowe; Joe L Barnes; Maryanne J. George; Pat Barrett; Tiffany Hammer	4:59

All tracks on Side B: Same Blood were produced by Harold Brown and Jeff Schneeweis, except where stated.

Side B: Same Blood
No.	Title	Writer(s)	Producer(s)	Length
1.	"Side B: Intro Prayer" (featuring Lecrae)	Lecrae		4:04
2.	"Same Blood" (featuring Joe L Barnes and Koryn Hawthorne)	Jeff Schneeweis; Joe L Barnes; Laila Olivera		2:51
3.	"Sunday Morning" (featuring Harolddd, Tamar Braxton and Lecrae)	Harold Brown; Schneeweis; Lecrae; Melody Adorno		3:02
4.	"Pretty Brown Skin" (featuring Eugene Kiing)	Alton Eugene	Alton Eugene; Harold Brown; Jeff Schneeweis	3:44
5.	"On and On" (featuring Harolddd, Ciara and Rapsody)	Brandon Love; Brown; Schneeweis; Jessie Cline; Omar; Rapsody; Siri Worku		2:57
6.	"Not Afraid" (featuring Naomi Raine)	Brown; Schneeweis; Naomi Raine	Harold Brown; Jeff Schneeweis; Naomi Raine	3:40
7.	"God Don't Make Mistakes" (featuring Dante Bowe and Montell Fish)	Dante Bowe; Montell Fish	Harold Brown; Jeff Schneeweis; Montell Fish	3:50
8.	"Its Ok" (featuring Chandler Moore)	Chandler Moore		5:00

Jubilee: Juneteenth Edition — Apple Music exclusive video content
No.	Title	Length
1.	"Make It Right" (featuring Dante Bowe, Todd Dulaney, Jekalyn Carr and Mav City Gospel Choir)	8:41
2.	"Mighty One" (featuring Todd Dulaney, Maryanne J. George and Mav City Gospel Choir)	6:13
3.	"Breathe" (featuring Chandler Moore, Jonathan McReynolds, Doe and Mav City Gospel Choir)	7:59
4.	"Jireh" (featuring Chandler Moore, Naomi Raine and Mav City Gospel Choir)	6:00
5.	"Freedom Looks Good on You" (featuring Israel Houghton, Ryan Ofei, Bri Babineaux and Mav City Gospel Choir)	9:06
6.	"Keep Praying" (featuring Doe, Ryan Ofei and Mav City Gospel Choir)	7:38
7.	"Son of Suffering" (featuring Jekalyn Carr, Chandler Moore and Mav City Gospel Choir)	5:51
8.	"Joy of the Lord" (featuring Dante Bowe, Naomi Raine, Katie Torwalt and Mav City Gospel Choir)	14:23
9.	"God Will Work It Out" (featuring Naomi Raine, Israel Houghton and Mav City Gospel Choir)	8:07
10.	"Sufficient for Today" (featuring Maryanne J. George and Mav City Gospel Choir)	4:58

== Charts ==
=== Weekly charts ===
Weekly chart performance for Jubilee: Juneteenth Edition
Chart (2021)	Peak position
UK Christian & Gospel Albums (OCC)	10
US Top Christian Albums (Billboard)	8
US Top Gospel Albums (Billboard)	2

=== Year-end charts ===
Year-end chart performance for Jubilee: Juneteenth Edition
Chart (2021)	Position
US Christian Albums (Billboard)	80
US Gospel Albums (Billboard)	21
Chart (2022)	Position
US Gospel Albums (Billboard)	16
Chart (2023)	Position
US Gospel Albums (Billboard)	20
Chart (2025)	Position
US Gospel Albums (Billboard)	39

== Release history ==
Region	Date	Format(s)	Label(s)	Ref.
Various	June 18, 2021	Digital download; streaming	Tribl Records	
