= Mercy (Elevation Worship and Maverick City Music song) =

2021 song by Elevation Worship and Maverick City Music

Song by Elevation Worship and Maverick City Music featuring Chris Brown

from the album Old Church Basement
- Released: April 30, 2021
- Recorded: 2021
- Genre: Contemporary worship music
- Length: 8:35
- Label: Elevation Worship
- Songwriters: Chris Brown; Jason Ingram; Dante Bowe
- Producers: Chris Brown; Steven Furtick; Jason Ingram; Tony Brown; Jonathan Jay

Music video
- "Mercy" on YouTube
- "Mercy" (Lyrics) on YouTube

"Mercy" is a song performed by American contemporary worship bands Elevation Worship and Maverick City Music, which features vocals from Chris Brown. The song was released as the eleventh track of the collaborative album, Old Church Basement on April 30, 2021. It was written by Brandon Lake, Chris Brown, and Steven Furtick.

"Mercy" debuted at No. 18 on the US Hot Christian Songs chart, and at No. 6 on the Hot Gospel Songs chart, despite not being released as an official single.

== Composition ==
"Mercy" is a piano-driven song, composed in the key of A with a tempo of 62 beats per minute and a musical time signature of 4/4. The lyrics of the song are testimonial; the singer affirms "that Jesus is alive in us and that He has rescued us from the grave."

== Critical reception ==
Joshua Andre, reviewing for 365 Days of Inspiring Media, gave a favorable opinion of the song, said that the song is a potential radio single and future Sunday morning staple: "we are met with a testimony type track that is sure to win over listeners and critics alike." After the release of the album, "Mercy" made its debut at No. 18 on the US Hot Christian Songs chart, and at No. 6 on the Hot Gospel Songs chart, both on May 15, 2021.

== Music videos ==
On April 30, 2021, Elevation Worship published the lyric video of the song on YouTube. On May 6, 2021, Elevation Worship released the official music video of "Mercy" on their YouTube channel. The video shows Chris Brown leading the song.

== Charts ==
=== Weekly charts ===
Weekly chart performance for "Mercy"
Chart (2021)	Peak position
US Hot Christian Songs (Billboard)	18
US Gospel Songs (Billboard)	6

=== Year-end charts ===
Year-end chart performance for "Mercy"
Chart (2021)	Position
US Gospel Songs (Billboard)	45
