= Man of Your Word =

2020 song by Maverick City Music featuring Chandler Moore and KJ Scriven

Single by Maverick City Music featuring Chandler Moore and KJ Scriven

from the album Maverick City Vol. 3 Part 1
- Released: August 21, 2020
- Recorded: 2019
- Studio: 1971 Sounds, Atlanta, Georgia, U.S.
- Genre: Contemporary worship music
- Length: 3:19
- Label: Maverick City Music
- Songwriter(s): Jonathan Jay; Tony Brown; Nathan Jess; Chandler Moore
- Producer(s): Jonathan Jay; Tony Brown; Jonathan Hay

Maverick City Music singles chronology
"Man of Your Word" (2020)	"Acercame" (2021)

Chandler Moore singles chronology
"Bless Your Name" (2020)	"Man of Your Word" (2020)	"Voice of God" (2020)

KJ Scriven singles chronology
"Perfect God" (2020)	"Man of Your Word" (2020)	"Trust in You" (2020)

Music video
- "Man of Your Word" on YouTube

"Man of Your Word" is a song performed by American contemporary worship collective Maverick City Music featuring Chandler Moore and KJ Scriven. The song was released on Christian radio on August 21, 2020 as the lead single to their debut studio album, Maverick City Vol. 3 Part 1 (2020). The song was written by Chandler Moore, Jonathan Jay, Nathan Jess, Jonathan Hay and Tony Brown. Tony Brown collaborated with Jonathan Jay in the production of the single.

"Man of Your Word" reached No. 18 on the US Hot Christian Songs chart. "Man of Your Word" was nominated for the Grammy Award for Best Contemporary Christian Music Performance/Song at the 2022 Grammy Awards.

== Release ==
Maverick City Music released the radio version of the song in digital format on November 6, 2020.

== Composition ==
"Man of Your Word" is composed in the key of B with a tempo of 70 beats per minute and a musical time signature of 4/4.

== Commercial performance ==
"Man of Your Word" debuted at number 50 on the US Hot Christian Songs chart dated May 9, 2020. The song fell off the chart and returned after eight weeks, at number 48. The song went on to peak at number 18 on the chart.

== Accolades ==
Awards
Year	Organization	Award	Result	Ref
2022	Grammy Awards	Best Contemporary Christian Music Performance/Song	Nominated	

== Music video ==
The official music video for the "Man of Your Word" was premiered on YouTube via Tribl, April 17, 2020. This video was captured with the Maverick City Music Choir in Atlanta at 1971 Sounds as a part of a song share and recording night for Maverick City Vol. 3 Part 1.

== Performances ==
On June 23, 2022, Maverick City Music performed "Man of Your Word" on their Tiny Desk Concert performance as part of NPR Music's commemoration of Black Music Month.

== Charts ==
=== Weekly charts ===
Weekly chart performance for "Man of Your Word"
Chart (2020)	Peak position
US Hot Christian Songs (Billboard)	18
US Christian Airplay (Billboard)	17
US Christian AC (Billboard)	11

=== Year-end charts ===
Year-end chart performance for "Man of Your Word"
Chart (2020)	Position
US Christian Songs (Billboard)	73

== Release history ==
Release history and formats for "Man of Your Word"
Region	Date	Format	Label	Ref.
United States	August 21, 2020	Christian radio	Maverick City Music	
Various	November 6, 2020	Digital download; streaming	Maverick City Music	

== Other versions ==
- Nathan Jess released his own rendition of the song as a single with Leah McFall appearing as a featured vocalist.
