= Not Just Stories =

2021 EP by Maryanne J. George

EP by Maryanne J. George
- Released: October 8, 2021
- Recorded: 2021
- Genre: Contemporary worship music
- Label: Tribl
- Producer: Austin Davis

Not Just Stories is the debut extended play by American contemporary worship musician Maryanne J. George. The EP was released on October 8, 2021, via Tribl Records. The EP contains guest appearances by Mitch Wong, Naomi Raine, Dante Bowe, Justus Tams, and Aaron Moses. Austin Davis handled the production of the EP.

Not Just Stories debuted at number twelve on Billboard's Top Christian Albums Chart and number three on Top Gospel Albums Chart.

== Background ==
In September 2021, Tribl Records announced that they will be releasing Not Just Stories, the debut extended play by Maryanne J. George, on October 8, 2021. The EP featured collaborations with fellow Maverick City Music artists Dante Bowe, Naomi Raine, and Aaron Moses, with additional features from Mitch Wong and Justus Tams.

Maryanne J. George spoke of the album in an interview, saying:

I've said before that this album feels very grounding to me. It captures my heart's cry for the last 11 years, when Mav City didn't exist, and the most important thing to me was serving in my local Indian church as best as I could. I really took that responsibility seriously. God was doing things in me then, cultivating in me a heart of devotion and a spirit of longing. I think this whole album attests to those years. It's focused on surrender, devotion, and sacrifice: tenants [sic] of worship. My prayer is that this album brings us back to the heart of worship.

== Release and promotion ==
On September 17, 2021, Maryanne J. George released "Not Just Stories" featuring Aaron Moses as the first and only promotional single from the EP.

== Commercial performance ==
Not Just Stories debuted at debuted at number twelve on the Top Christian Albums Chart and number three on the Top Gospel Albums Chart published by Billboard in the United States having sold 3,000 equivalent album units.

== Track listing ==
Not Just Stories
No.	Title	Writer(s)	Length
1.	"Prayer"	Maryanne J. George	3:25
2.	"Journey" (featuring Mitch Wong)	Dante Bowe; George; Mitch Wong	7:01
3.	"You Have My Yes" (featuring Naomi Raine)	Brandon Lake; Brett Younker; George; Tim Timmons	5:18
4.	"I'm Gonna Worship" (featuring Dante Bowe)	Bowe; Majesty Rose Bergman; George	11:47
5.	"Altar" (featuring Justus Tams)	Bowe; Eniola Abioye; George; Wong	10:40
6.	"Be Glorified (Spontaneous)" (featuring Justus Tams)	Billy Funk; George	5:16
7.	"Not Just Stories" (featuring Aaron Moses)	Bowe; Aaron Moses; Jesse Cline; George; Wong	8:40

Not Just Stories — Apple Music bonus video content
No.	Title	Length
1.	"Journey" (featuring Mitch Wong)	7:03
2.	"You Have My Yes" (featuring Naomi Raine)	5:18
3.	"I’m Gonna Worship" (featuring Dante Bowe)	11:47
4.	"Altar" (featuring Justus Tams)	10:40
5.	"Be Glorified (Spontaneous)" (featuring Justus Tams)	5:17
6.	"Not Just Stories" (featuring Aaron Moses)	8:40

== Charts ==
=== Weekly charts ===
Weekly chart performance for Not Just Stories
Chart (2021)	Peak position
US Christian Albums (Billboard)	12
US Gospel Albums (Billboard)	3
US Top Album Sales (Billboard)	49

=== Year-end charts ===
Year-end chart performance for Not Just Stories
Chart (2021)	Position
US Gospel Albums (Billboard)	44

== Release history ==
Region	Date	Format	Label	Ref.
Various	October 8, 2021	CD; digital download; streaming	Tribl Records	
