= Talking to Jesus =

2021 song by Elevation Worship and Maverick City Music

Promotional single by Elevation Worship and Maverick City Music featuring Brandon Lake

from the album Old Church Basement
- Released: April 9, 2021
- Recorded: 2021
- Genre: Contemporary worship music
- Length: 8:29
- Label: Elevation Worship
- Songwriter(s): Brandon Lake; Chris Brown; Steven Furtick
- Producer(s): Chris Brown; Steven Furtick; Jason Ingram; Tony Brown; Jonathan Jay

Music video
- "Talking to Jesus" on YouTube
- "Talking to Jesus" (Lyrics) on YouTube

"Talking to Jesus" is a song performed by American contemporary worship bands Elevation Worship and Maverick City Music, which features vocals from Brandon Lake. The song was released on April 9, 2021, as a promotional single from their collaborative live album, Old Church Basement (2021). The song was written by Brandon Lake, Chris Brown, and Steven Furtick.

"Talking to Jesus" debuted at No. 9 on the US Hot Christian Songs chart, and at No. 1 on the Hot Gospel Songs chart.

Brandon Lake and Thomas Rhett released a live rendition of "Talking to Jesus" as a standalone single on May 12, 2023. Their rendition peaked at No. 26 on the US Hot Christian Songs chart.

== Background ==
On April 9, 2021, Elevation Worship and Maverick City Music released "Talking to Jesus" featuring Brandon Lake as the second promotional single from their collaborative album, Old Church Basement (2021). "Talking to Jesus" is the follow-up to the first promotional single from the album, "Jireh". The song also marks Brandon Lake's second appearance on an Elevation Worship project, having co-written and featured on the hit single "Graves into Gardens".

== Writing and development ==
Chris Brown of Elevation Worship shared the story about how the song came about, saying

That morning Brandon and I were hacking away at a really fast song idea on a $200 bass and a Gretsch guitar when pastor [Steven Furtick] walked in on a mission to share the lyric idea that had come to him in the car on the way over.

Brown further added that he had difficulty explaining how they fell into a two chord trance that lasted several hours, with Furtick telling stories on the microphone, but that is how the song came about.

== Composition ==
"Talking to Jesus" is composed in the key of B with a tempo of 59 beats per minute, and a musical time signature of 4/4.

== Commercial performance ==
"Talking to Jesus" debuted at No. 9 on the US Hot Christian Songs chart and at No. 1 on the Hot Gospel Songs chart, both dated April 22, 2021. "Talking to Jesus" attracted 2 million streams and 4,000 downloads in the United States in its first week. "Talking to Jesus" is the second Hot Gospel Songs chart-topper for Elevation Worship and Maverick City Music, while being Brandon Lake's first No. 1 entry on the chart. On Hot Christian Songs, it is the eighth top ten entry for Elevation Worship, and the second for Maverick City Music and Lake.

== Music videos ==
On April 9, 2021, Elevation Worship released the official music video of "Talking to Jesus" on their YouTube channel. The video shows Brandon Lake leading the song.

On April 30, 2021, Elevation Worship published the lyric video of the song on YouTube.

== Charts ==
=== Weekly charts ===
Weekly chart performance for "Talking to Jesus"
Chart (2021)	Peak position
New Zealand Hot Singles (RMNZ)	38
US Christian Songs (Billboard)	9
US Digital Song Sales (Billboard)	34
US Gospel Songs (Billboard)	1

=== Year-end charts ===
Year-end chart performance for "Talking to Jesus"
Chart (2021)	Position
US Christian Songs (Billboard)	71
US Gospel Songs (Billboard)	28

== Certifications ==
Region	Certification	Certified units/sales
United States (RIAA)	Gold	500,000^{‡}
^{‡} Sales+streaming figures based on certification alone.

== Release history ==
Release history for "Talking to Jesus"
Region	Date	Format	Label	Ref.
Various	April 24, 2021	Digital download (promotional release); streaming (promotional release)	Elevation Worship Records	

== Brandon Lake and Thomas Rhett version ==
"Talking to Jesus"

Single by Brandon Lake and Thomas Rhett
- Released: May 12, 2023
- Recorded: April 16, 2023
- Venue: Ryman Auditorium, Nashville, Tennessee, U.S.
- Genre: Contemporary worship music
- Length: 7:30
- Label: Provident Label Group

Brandon Lake singles chronology
"Plead the Blood" (2023)	"Talking to Jesus" (2023)	"Praise You Anywhere" (2023)

Thomas Rhett singles chronology
"Angels (Don't Always Have Wings)" (2023)	"Talking to Jesus" (2023)	"Mamaw's House" (2023)

Music video
- "Talking to Jesus" (Live from The Ryman) on YouTube

Brandon Lake and Thomas Rhett released a live version of "Talking to Jesus" as a standalone single on May 12, 2023. The track was recorded during the Lake's headlining Miracle Nights Tour on April 16, 2023, at the Ryman Auditorium in Nashville, Tennessee.

=== Commercial performance ===
"Talking to Jesus" debuted at No. 26 on the US Hot Christian Songs chart dated May 27, 2023, concurrently charting at No. 8 on the Christian Digital Song Sales chart.

=== Music videos ===
On May 11, 2023, the audio video of "Too Good to Not Believe" was published on Brandon Lake's YouTube channel, as well as the live performance video of the song alongside Thomas Rhett a day later.

=== Track listing ===
"Talking To Jesus (Live from The Ryman)"
No.	Title	Length
1.	"Talking To Jesus" (Live from The Ryman)	7:30
2.	"Intro + Talking To Jesus" (Live from The Ryman)	9:26

=== Charts ===
Chart performance for "Talking to Jesus"
Chart (2023)	Peak position
US Christian Songs (Billboard)	26

=== Release history ===
Region	Date	Format	Label	Ref.
Various	May 12, 2023	Digital download; streaming	Provident Label Group	
