= Closer (Maverick City Music song) =

2020 song by Maverick City Music

Song by Maverick City Music featuring Brandon Lake

from the album Maverick City, Vol. 3 Pt. 2
- Released: October 9, 2020
- Studio: 1971 Sounds, Atlanta, Georgia, U.S.
- Genre: Contemporary worship music
- Length: 6:40
- Label: Maverick City Music
- Songwriter: Brandon Lake
- Producers: Jonathan Jay; Tony Brown

Music video
- "Closer" on YouTube

"Closer" is a song performed by American contemporary worship collective Maverick City Music featuring Brandon Lake. It was released as the closing track on their second live album, Maverick City, Vol. 3 Pt. 2, on October 9, 2020. The song was written by Brandon Lake, and Lake had released the original version of the song on his debut studio album, Closer (2016). Jonathan Jay and Tony Brown produced the song.

"Closer" peaked at No. 45 on the US Hot Christian Songs chart.

== Background ==
Maverick City Music released their second live album, Maverick City, Vol. 3 Pt. 2 on October 9, 2020, with the song "Closer" featuring Brandon Lake as the closing track on the record. Jonathan Jay shared the breakdown of the song with Apple Music, saying: "It says, 'I need your love like I need water. I need your love like I need breath inside of my lungs.' It's a song of desperation: 'Lord, who are we without you?' It's just a song of dependence. We need that perspective and that reminder often, and it's so apropos for today."

The music video of the song was released on January 8, 2021.

== Composition ==
"Closer" is composed in the key of B major with a tempo of 130 beats per minute, and a musical time signature of 4/4.

== Commercial performance ==
Following the release of the music video, "Closer" debuted at No. 45 on the US Hot Christian Songs chart dated January 23, 2021. It spent a total of three non-consecutive weeks on the Hot Christian Songs Chart.

== Music video ==
Tribl released the official music video of "Closer" by Maverick City Music featuring Brandon Lake leading the song at 1971 Sounds in Atlanta, Georgia, through their YouTube channel on January 8, 2021.

== Charts ==
Weekly chart performance for "Closer"
Chart (2020–2021)	Peak position
US Hot Christian Songs (Billboard)	45
