= Million Little Miracles =

2021 song by Elevation Worship and Maverick City Music

Song by Elevation Worship and Maverick City Music featuring Joe L. Barnes

from the album Old Church Basement
- Released: April 30, 2021
- Recorded: 2021
- Genre: Contemporary worship music
- Length: 6:45
- Label: Elevation Worship
- Songwriters: Steven Furtick; Chris Brown; Brandon Lake
- Producers: Chris Brown; Steven Furtick; Jason Ingram; Tony Brown; Jonathan Jay

Music video
- "Million Little Miracles" on YouTube
- "Million Little Miracles" (Lyrics) on YouTube

"Million Little Miracles" is a song performed by American contemporary worship bands Elevation Worship and Maverick City Music, which features vocals from Joe L. Barnes. The song was released as the sixth track of the collaborative album, Old Church Basement on April 30, 2021. The song was written by Brandon Lake, Chris Brown, and Steven Furtick.

"Million Little Miracles" debuted at No. 23 on the US Hot Christian Songs chart, and at No. 7 on the Hot Gospel Songs chart, despite not being released as an official single.

== Composition ==
"Million Little Miracles" is a slow-tempo reflective song, composed in the key of E with a tempo of 50 beats per minute, and a musical time signature of 4/4. The lyrics of the song are testimonial, as the singer expresses thankfulness for God's miracles, pointing toward his faithfulness over his life.

== Critical reception ==
Joshua Andre, reviewing for 365 Days of Inspiring Media, gave a favorable opinion of the song, saying: "this song is powerful and important as it’s a great facilitator, ushering us into a heavenly moment with our heavenly Father."

== Commercial performance ==
Following the release of the album, "Million Little Miracles" made its debut at No. 23 on the US Hot Christian Songs chart, and at No. 7 on the Hot Gospel Songs chart, both dated May 15, 2021.

== Music videos ==
On April 30, 2021, Elevation Worship published the lyric video of the song on YouTube.

On May 10, 2021, Elevation Worship released the official music video of "Million Little Miracles" on their YouTube channel. The video shows Joe L. Barnes leading the song.

== Charts ==
=== Weekly charts ===
Weekly chart performance for "Million Little Miracles"
Chart (2021)	Peak position
US Hot Christian Songs (Billboard)	23
US Gospel Songs (Billboard)	7

=== Year-end charts ===
Year-end chart performance for "Million Little Miracles"
Chart (2021)	Position
US Christian Songs (Billboard)	96
US Gospel Songs (Billboard)	40

== Certifications ==
Region	Certification	Certified units/sales
United States (RIAA)	Gold	500,000^{‡}
^{‡} Sales+streaming figures based on certification alone.
