= Old Church Basement =

2021 live album by Elevation Worship and Maverick City Music

Live album by Elevation Worship and Maverick City Music
- Released: April 30, 2021
- Recorded: 2021
- Venue: Elevation Church, Charlotte, North Carolina, US
- Genre: Contemporary worship music; contemporary gospel
- Length: 103:51
- Label: Elevation Worship; Provident Label Group
- Producer: Chris Brown; Steven Furtick; Jason Ingram; Tony Brown; Jonathan Jay

Elevation Worship chronology
Graves into Gardens: Morning & Evening (2021)	Old Church Basement (2021)	Lion (2022)

Maverick City Music chronology
Como En El Cielo (2021)	Old Church Basement (2021)	Jubilee: Juneteenth Edition (2021)

Singles from Old Church Basement
- 1. "Jireh" Released: April 1, 2021

Old Church Basement is a collaborative live album by American contemporary worship groups Elevation Worship and Maverick City Music. It was released on April 30, 2021, via Sony Music Nashville through their imprints Elevation Worship Records and Provident Label Group. The featured worship leaders on the album are Dante Bowe, Chandler Moore, Naomi Raine, Brandon Lake, Joe L. Barnes, Tiffany Hudson, Chris Brown, and Amanda Lindsey Cook. The album was produced by Chris Brown, Steven Furtick, Jason Ingram, Tony Brown, and Jonathan Jay.

Old Church Basement is supported by "Jireh", which was released as a single, and "Talking to Jesus" and "Wait on You", which were released as promotional singles. "Jireh" debuted at No. 10 on the US Hot Christian Songs chart and atop the Hot Gospel Songs chart. "Talking to Jesus" debuted at No. 9 on the Hot Christian Songs chart and atop the Hot Gospel Songs chart. "Wait on You" also debuted at No. 9 on the Hot Christian Songs chart and atop the Hot Gospel Songs chart.

Old Church Basement became a commercially successful album upon its release, debuting at No. 1 on Billboard's Top Christian Albums Chart and Top Gospel Albums Chart in the United States, and at No. 2 on the Official Charts' Official Christian & Gospel Albums Chart in the United Kingdom, concurrently attaining top 100 mainstream chart entries in the United States, Australia, Canada, New Zealand, and Switzerland. The album was ranked by Billboard as the second biggest gospel album in 2021, and in 2022. Old Church Basement won the Dove Award for Worship Album of the Year at the 52nd Dove Awards in 2021. At the 2022 Grammy Awards, the album won the Grammy Award for Best Contemporary Christian Music Album, with "Jireh" being nominated for Best Contemporary Christian Music Performance/Song and "Wait on You" also getting nominated for Best Gospel Performance/Song. At the 2022 Billboard Music Awards, it was also nominated for the Billboard Music Award for Top Christian Album and Top Gospel Album, while "Jireh" got nominated for Billboard Music Award for Top Christian Song.

== Release and promotion ==
On March 26, 2021, Elevation Worship and Maverick City Music announced their first collaborative album, titled Old Church Basement, will be slated for release on April 30, 2021, concurrently availing the album for digital pre-order. That same day, they released "Jireh" featuring Chandler Moore and Naomi Raine, as the first promotional single from the album, along with its accompanying music video. "Jireh" debuted at No. 10 on the US Hot Christian Songs chart, and No. 1 on the Hot Gospel Songs chart.

On April 9, 2021, Elevation Worship and Maverick City Music released "Talking to Jesus" featuring Brandon Lake as the second promotional single from the album. "Talking to Jesus" debuted at No. 9 on the US Hot Christian Songs chart, and No. 1 on the Hot Gospel Songs chart.

On April 23, 2021, Elevation Worship and Maverick City Music released "Wait on You" featuring Dante Bowe and Chandler Moore as the third and final promotional single from the album, along with its accompanying music video. "Wait on You" debuted at No. 9 on the US Hot Christian Songs chart, and No. 1 on the Hot Gospel Songs chart.

Elevation Worship and Maverick City Music released the album on April 30, 2021, also availing the music video for the song "Build Your Church" which features Naomi Raine and Chris Brown, on YouTube.

== Reception ==
=== Critical response ===
Professional ratings
Review scores
Source	Rating
365 Days of Inspiring Media	4.5/5
JubileeCast	4.25/5
One Man In The Middle	3.8/5 stars

Joshua Andre in his 365 Days of Inspiring Media review, described the album as being more cohesive than Elevation Worship's previous releases such as Graves into Gardens and Hallelujah Here Below, declaring that "Old Church Basement stands tall amongst quite a lot of worship albums from this year- both Elevation Worship and Maverick City Music deserve to be congratulated, and to be proud of themselves." Timothy Yap, reviewing for JubileeCast, gave a favourable review of the album, saying: "Old Church Basement, as the title suggests, isn't an exercise of glamor and applause. Rather, it's worship music that is personal, biblical, and heartfelt." Yap noted however, that the track length of the songs and them being mostly ballads were the major weaknesses of the record, opining that the listening experience "can be on the taxing and tedious side." Kayleigh Fongers gave a favourable review of the album for The Banner, saying "So what's the secret to the album's success? It's safe to say that the answer lies in its refreshing simplicity. The style is intimate, and most of the songs draw on transparent biblical truths. It's an unfiltered and personal worship experience." Rob Allwright, reviewing for One Man In The Middle, opined "There are many positive points for this album. The early songs are very catch, you will not forget the choruses and bridges easily, they will stick with you for some time to come. There are a range of different voices on the project who all bring a great vocal and a touch of variety and diversity which is always welcome. There are a variety of songwriters, although Steven Furtick's influence is very apparent on many of the tracks."

=== Accolades ===
Awards
Year	Organization	Award	Result	Ref.
2021	GMA Dove Awards	Worship Album of the Year	Won	
2022	Billboard Music Awards	Top Christian Album	Nominated	
2022	Billboard Music Awards	Top Gospel Album	Nominated	
2022	Grammy Awards	Best Contemporary Christian Music Album	Won	

Year-end lists
Publication	Accolade	Rank	Ref.
JubileeCast	Best Christian Albums of 2021	10	
Louder Than The Music	LTTM Album Awards 2021	5	

== Commercial performance ==
In the United States, Old Church Basement earned 19,000 equivalent album units in its first week of sales, and as a result debuted at No. 1 on the Top Christian Albums Chart and the Top Gospel Albums Chart dated May 15, 2021, becoming the first album to simultaneously debut atop both religious charts since the release of Kanye West's album Jesus Is King (2019). Old Church Basement is Elevation Worship's sixth No. 1 entry and Maverick City Music's first No. 1 entry on the Top Christian Albums Chart, while being Elevation Worship's first No. 1 entry and Maverick City Music's second No. 1 entry on the Top Gospel Albums Chart. The album concurrently registered on the mainstream Billboard 200 chart at No. 30. Old Church Basement debuted on the OCC's Official Christian & Gospel Albums Chart at No. 2.

Old Church Basement also appeared at No. 51 on the Australian ARIA Albums Chart, No. 78 on the Canadian Albums Chart, No. 35 on Official New Zealand Music Chart, and No. 93 on the Swiss Hitparade.

== Track listing ==
Old Church Basement
No.	Title	Writer(s)	Length
1.	"Old Church Basement" (featuring Dante Bowe)	Dante Bowe; Steven Furtick; Brandon Lake; Chandler Moore	6:42
2.	"Jireh" (featuring Chandler Moore and Naomi Raine)	Moore; Naomi Raine; Furtick; Chris Brown	9:58
3.	"Talking to Jesus" (featuring Brandon Lake)	Lake; Furtick; Brown	8:29
4.	"Wait on You" (featuring Dante Bowe and Chandler Moore)	Bowe; Moore; Furtick; Brown; Tiffany Hudson; Lake	9:24
5.	"Wait on You (Reprise)" (featuring Dante Bowe and Chandler Moore)	Bowe; Moore; Furtick; Brown; Hudson; Lake	4:14
6.	"Million Little Miracles" (featuring Joe L Barnes and Tiffany Hudson)	Furtick; Brown; Lake	6:45
7.	"Shall Not Want" (featuring Chandler Moore)	Moore; Furtick; Brown; Raine	8:09
8.	"Come Again" (featuring Brandon Lake and Chandler Moore)	Lake; Moore; Furtick; Bowe	9:08
9.	"Used to This" (featuring Naomi Raine and Brandon Lake)	Raine; Lake; Furtick; Aaron Moses	7:37
10.	"Names" (featuring Tiffany Hudson)	Hudson; Amanda Lindsey Cook; Jason Ingram	7:00
11.	"Mercy" (featuring Chris Brown)	Brown; Ingram; Bowe	8:35
12.	"Before and After" (featuring Amanda Lindsey Cook)	Furtick; Cook; Ingram	8:39
13.	"Build Your Church" (featuring Naomi Raine and Chris Brown)	Raine; Alton Eugene	9:11
Total length:			103:51

Old Church Basement — Apple Music exclusive content
No.	Title	Length
14.	"Old Church Basement" (featuring Dante Bowe; music video)	6:38
15.	"Jireh" (featuring Chandler Moore and Naomi Raine; music video)	9:57
16.	"Talking to Jesus" (featuring Brandon Lake; music video)	8:29
17.	"Wait on You" (featuring Dante Bowe and Chandler Moore; music video)	13:40
18.	"Million Little Miracles" (featuring Joe L. Barnes; music video)	6:44
19.	"Shall Not Want" (featuring Chandler Moore; music video)	8:08
20.	"Come Again" (featuring Brandon Lake and Chandler Moore; music video)	9:03
21.	"Used to This" (featuring Naomi Raine and Brandon Lake; music video)	7:34
22.	"Names" (featuring Tiffany Hudson; music video)	6:56
23.	"Mercy" (featuring Chris Brown; music video)	8:29
24.	"Before and After" (featuring Amanda Lindsey Cook; music video)	8:35
25.	"Build Your Church" (featuring Naomi Raine and Chris Brown; music video)	6:53
Total length:		204:57

== Charts ==
=== Weekly charts ===
Weekly chart performance for Old Church Basement
Chart (2021)	Peak position
Australian Albums (ARIA)	51
Canadian Albums (Billboard)	78
New Zealand Albums (RMNZ)	35
Swiss Albums (Schweizer Hitparade)	93
UK Album Downloads (OCC)	16
UK Christian & Gospel Albums (OCC)	2
US Billboard 200	30
US Top Christian Albums (Billboard)	1
US Top Gospel Albums (Billboard)	1

=== Year-end charts ===
Year-end chart performance for Old Church Basement
Chart (2021)	Position
US Christian Albums (Billboard)	7
US Gospel Albums (Billboard)	2
Chart (2022)	Position
US Christian Albums (Billboard)	3
US Gospel Albums (Billboard)	2
Chart (2023)	Position
US Christian Albums (Billboard)	3
US Gospel Albums (Billboard)	2
Chart (2024)	Position
US Christian Albums (Billboard)	17
US Gospel Albums (Billboard)	4
Chart (2025)	Position
US Christian Albums (Billboard)	17
US Gospel Albums (Billboard)	6

== Certifications ==
Region	Certification	Certified units/sales
United States (RIAA)	Gold	500,000^{‡}
^{‡} Sales+streaming figures based on certification alone.

== Release history ==
Release history for Old Church Basement
Region	Date	Format(s)	Label(s)	Ref.
Various	April 30, 2021	Digital download; streaming	Elevation Worship Records	
Various	June 11, 2021	CD	Provident Label Group	
