= Grammy Award for Best Contemporary Christian Music Album =

- Awarded for: Best CCM albums
- Country: United States
- Presented by: National Academy of Recording Arts and Sciences
- First award: 2012
- Currently held by: Israel & New Breed – Coritos Vol. 1 (2026)
- Website: www.grammy.com

The Grammy Award for Best Contemporary Christian Music Album is an honor presented at the Grammy Awards to artists and producers who make the best albums in the contemporary Christian music (CCM) genre from the National Academy of Recording Arts and Sciences of the United States to help it "honor artistic achievement, technical proficiency and overall excellence in the recording industry, without regard to album sales or chart position".

The Best Contemporary Christian Music Album award was one of the new categories created after a major overhaul of the Grammy Awards categories for 2012. This award combines recordings that were previously submitted for the Best Pop/Contemporary Gospel Album, Best Rock or Rap Gospel Album and Best Southern, Country or Bluegrass Gospel Album. The category includes pop, rap/hip hop, Latin, or rock recordings.

The academy made a distinction between CCM and gospel music after determining that there were "two distinct wings to the gospel house" and that "gospel [tends] to conjure the images and sounds of traditional gospel but not CCM." With this in mind, it named the categories Best Gospel Album (for soul and urban contemporary gospel) and Best Contemporary Christian Music Album.

== Recipients ==
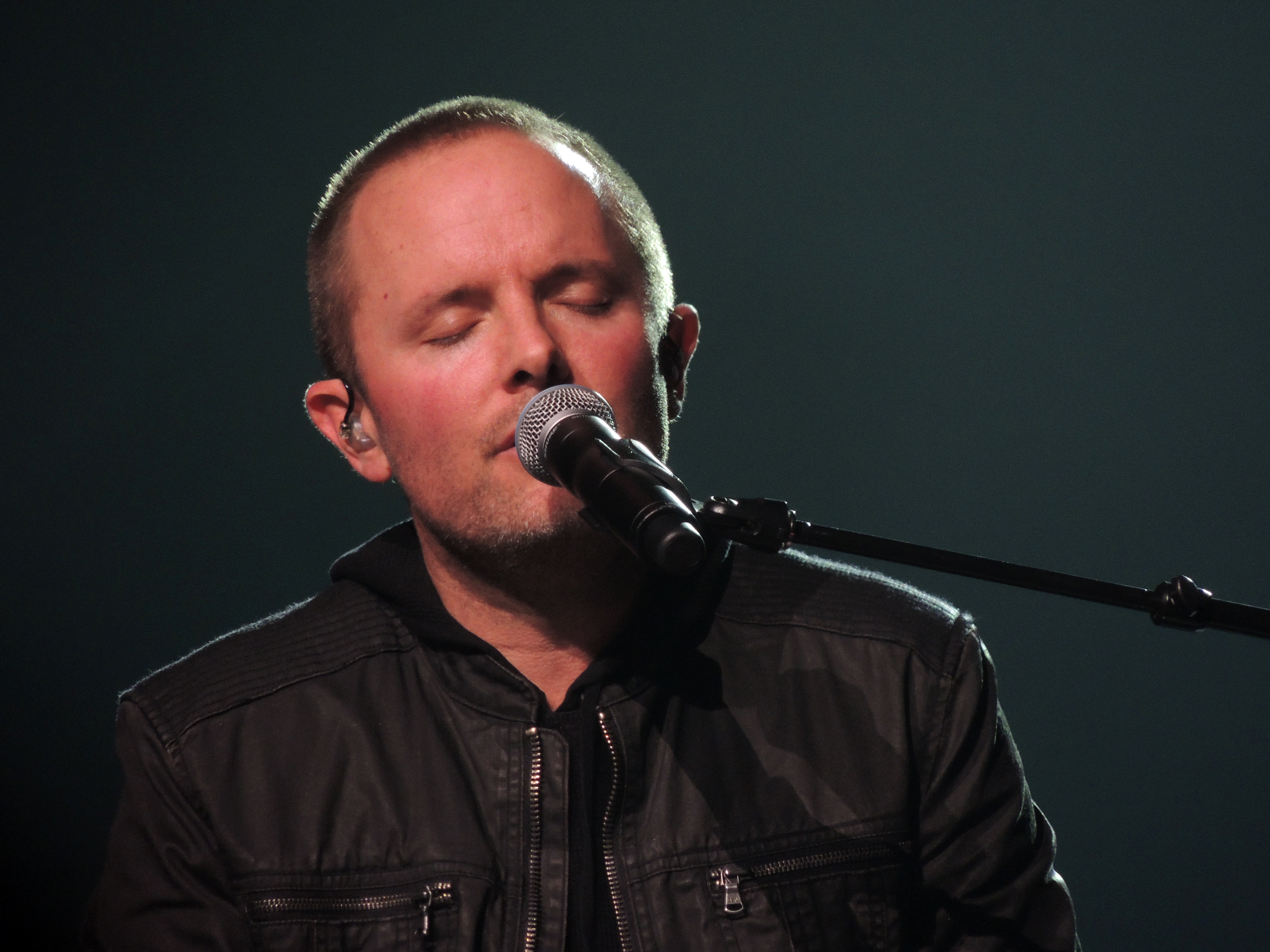
Chris Tomlin was the first recipient of the award in 2012.

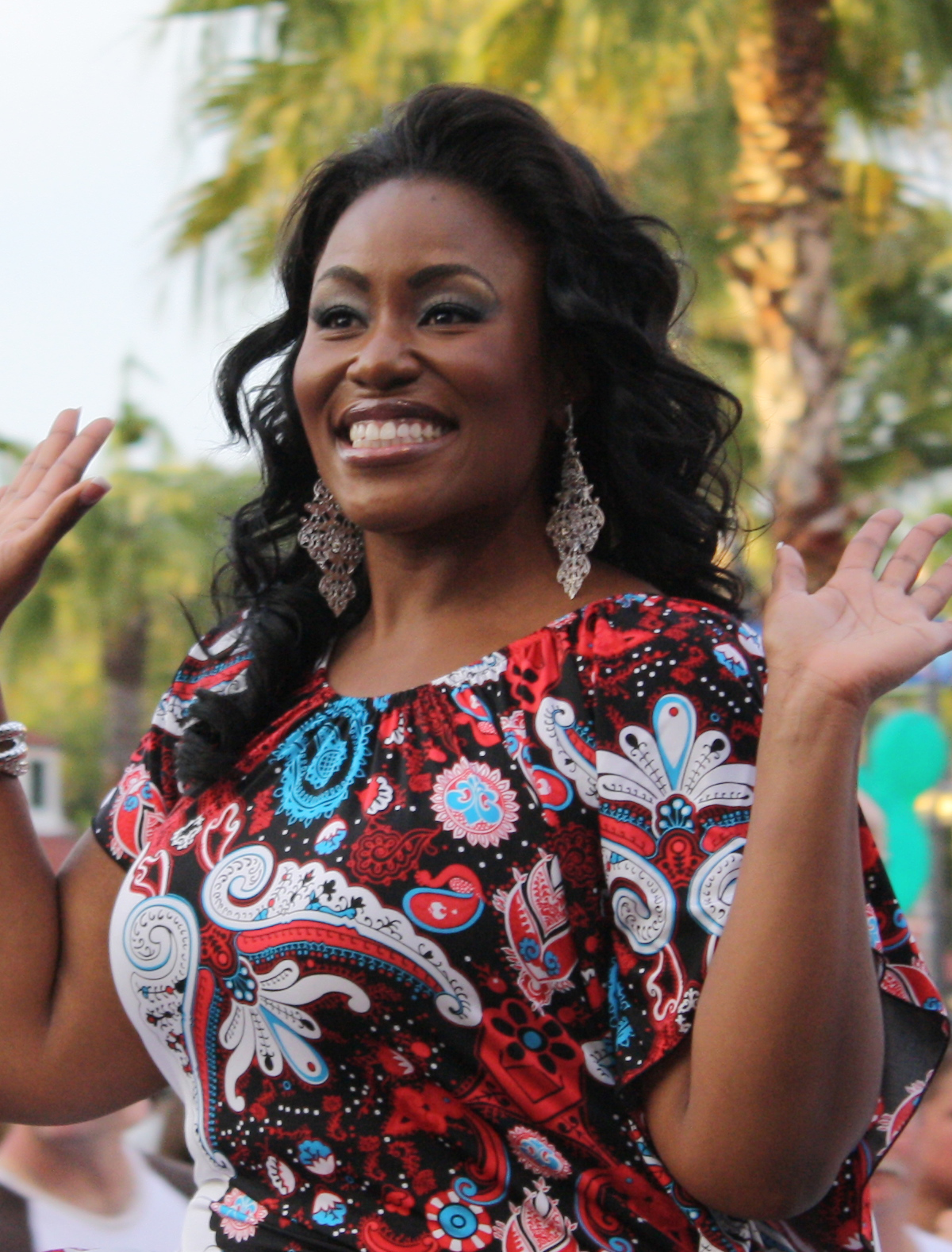
2014 winner Mandisa.

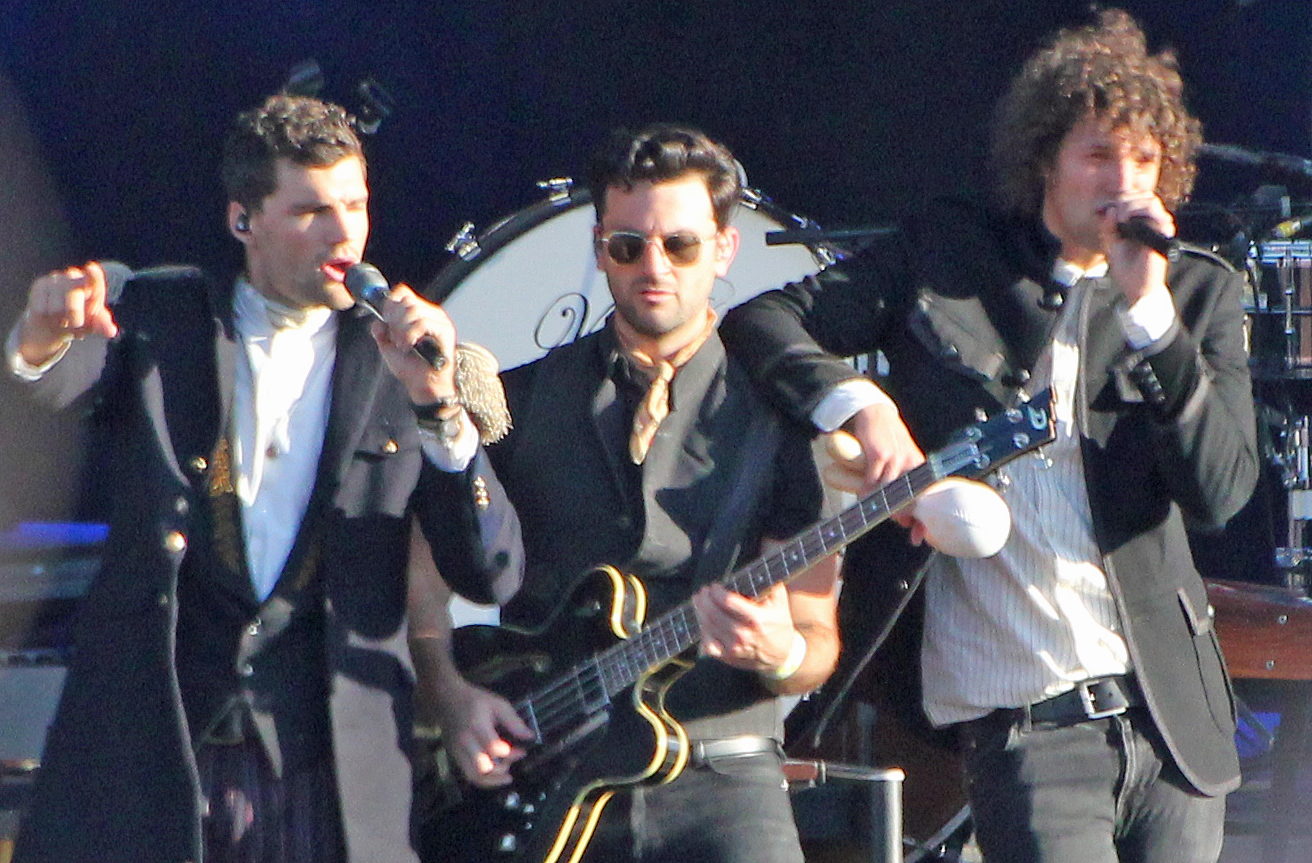
Two-time winners For King & Country.

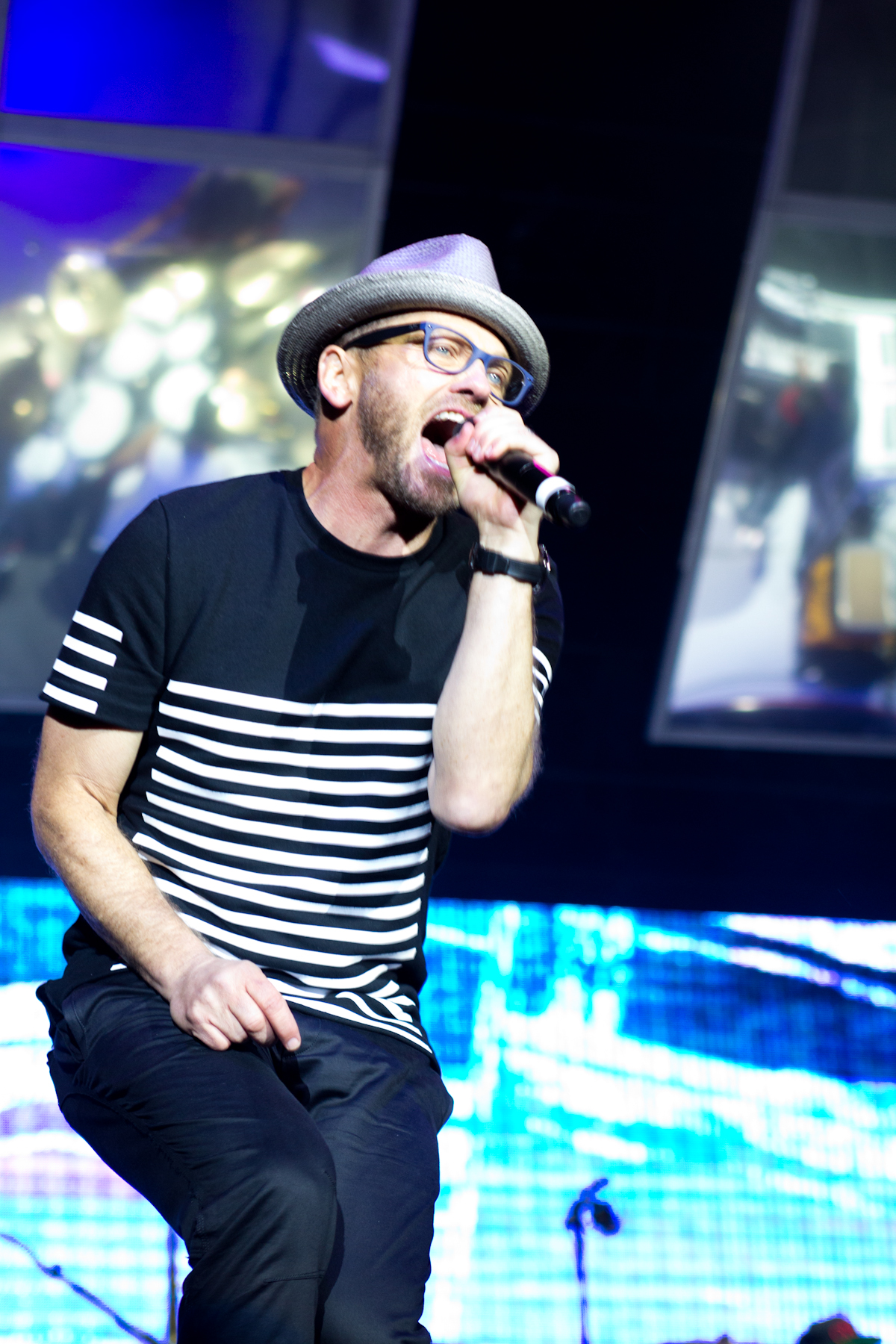
Two-time winner TobyMac.

=== 2010s ===
Year	Work	Artist
2012
2012	And If Our God Is for Us...	Chris Tomlin
2012	Black & White	Royal Tailor
2012	Ghosts Upon the Earth	Gungor
2012	The Great Awakening	Leeland
2012	Leaving Eden	Brandon Heath
2012	What If We Were Real	Mandisa
2013
2013	Eye on It	TobyMac
2013	Come to the Well	Casting Crowns
2013	Gold	Britt Nicole
2013	Into the Light	Matthew West
2013	Where I Find You	Kari Jobe
2014
2014	Overcomer	Mandisa
2014	All the People Said Amen (Live)	Matt Maher
2014	Burning Lights	Chris Tomlin
2014	We Won't Be Shaken	Building 429
2014	Your Grace Finds Me (Live)	Matt Redman
2015
2015	Run Wild. Live Free. Love Strong.	For King & Country
2015	Hurricane	Natalie Grant
2015	If We're Honest	Francesca Battistelli
2015	Royal Tailor	Royal Tailor
2015	Welcome to the New	MercyMe
2016
2016	This Is Not a Test	TobyMac
2016	How Can It Be	Lauren Daigle
2016	Love Ran Red	Chris Tomlin
2016	Saints and Sinners	Matt Maher
2016	Whatever the Road	Jason Crabb
2017
2017	Love Remains	Hillary Scott & the Scott Family
2017	American Prodigal	Crowder
2017	Be One	Natalie Grant
2017	Poets & Saints	All Sons & Daughters
2017	Youth Revival (Live)	Hillsong Young & Free
2018
2018	Chain Breaker	Zach Williams
2018	Echoes (Deluxe Edition)	Matt Maher
2018	Hills and Valleys	Tauren Wells
2018	Lifer	MercyMe
2018	Rise	Danny Gokey
2019
2019	Look Up Child	Lauren Daigle
2019	Hallelujah Here Below	Elevation Worship
2019	Living with a Fire	Jesus Culture
2019	Surrounded	Michael W. Smith
2019	Survivor: Live from Harding Prison	Zach Williams

=== 2020s ===
Year	Work	Artist
2020
2020	Burn the Ships	For King & Country
2020	The Elements	TobyMac
2020	Haven't Seen It Yet	Danny Gokey
2020	Holy Roar	Chris Tomlin
2020	I Know a Ghost	Crowder
2021
2021	Jesus Is King	Kanye West
2021	All of My Best Friends	Hillsong Young & Free
2021	Citizen of Heaven	Tauren Wells
2021	Holy Water	We the Kingdom
2021	Run to the Father	Cody Carnes
2022
2022	Old Church Basement	Elevation Worship and Maverick City Music
2022	The Blessing (Live)	Kari Jobe
2022	Citizen of Heaven (Live)	Tauren Wells
2022	Feels Like Home, Vol. 2	Israel & New Breed
2022	No Stranger	Natalie Grant
2023
2023	Breathe	Maverick City Music
2023	Always	Chris Tomlin
2023	Life After Death	TobyMac
2023	Lion	Elevation Worship
2023	My Jesus	Anne Wilson
2024
2024	Church Clothes 4	Lecrae
2024	Emanuel	Da' T.R.U.T.H.
2024	I Believe	Phil Wickham
2024	Lauren Daigle	Lauren Daigle
2024	My Tribe	Blessing Offor
2025
2025	Heart of a Human	DOE
2025	Child of God	Forrest Frank
2025	Coat of Many Colors	Brandon Lake
2025	The Maverick Way Complete	Maverick City Music, Naomi Raine and Chandler Moore
2025	When Wind Meets Fire	Elevation Worship
2026
2026	Coritos Vol. 1	Israel & New Breed
2026	Child of God II	Forrest Frank
2026	King of Hearts	Brandon Lake
2026	Let the Church Sing	Tauren Wells
2026	Reconstruction	Lecrae
2027
2027	Breathe on It	Tauren Wells
2027	Coritos Vol. 2	Israel & New Breed
2027	Jamie MacDonald	Jamie MacDonald
2027	King of Hearts — In the Room!	Brandon Lake
2027	Shiloh	DOE

- ^{^[I]} Each year is linked to the article about the Grammy Awards held that year.

== Multiple wins ==
2 wins

- TobyMac
- For King & Country
- Maverick City Music

== Multiple nominations ==
5 nominations

- Chris Tomlin
- Tauren Wells

4 nominations

- Elevation Worship

3 nominations

- Lauren Daigle
- Natalie Grant
- Israel & New Breed
- Brandon Lake
- Matt Maher
- Maverick City Music

2 nominations

- Crowder
- DOE
- Forrest Frank
- Danny Gokey
- Hillsong Young & Free
- Kari Jobe
- Lecrae
- Mandisa
- MercyMe
- Royal Tailor
- Zach Williams

== See also ==
- Grammy Award for Best Gospel/Contemporary Christian Music Performance
- Grammy Award for Best Contemporary Christian Music Song
- Grammy Award for Best Contemporary Christian Music Performance/Song
