= Breathe (Maverick City Music song) =

2021 song by Maverick City Music

Single by Maverick City Music featuring Jonathan McReynolds and Doe

from the album Jubilee: Juneteenth Edition
- Released: June 4, 2021
- Genre: Contemporary gospel
- Length: 8:04
- Label: Tribl Records
- Songwriters: Chandler Moore; Doe Jones; Jonathan McReynolds; Pat Barrett
- Producers: Aaron Moses; Brandon Lake; Chandler Moore; Jonathan Jay; Tony Brown

Maverick City Music singles chronology
"Promises" (2021)	"Breathe" (2021)	"Aleluya" (2021)

Jonathan McReynolds singles chronology
"People" (2020)	"Breathe" (2021)	"Can't Wait" (2021)

Doe singles chronology
"Good Now" (2021)	"Breathe" (2021)	"House of Miracles" (2021)

Music video
- "Breathe" on YouTube

"Breathe" is a song performed by American contemporary worship collective Maverick City Music featuring Jonathan McReynolds and Doe. The song was released on June 4, 2021, as the lead single to their fifth live album, Jubilee: Juneteenth Edition (2021). The song was written by Chandler Moore, Doe Jones, Jonathan McReynolds, and Pat Barrett.

"Breathe" peaked at number 31 on the US Hot Christian Songs chart, and number ten on the Hot Gospel Songs chart. "Breathe" won the GMA Dove Award for Gospel Worship Recorded Song of the Year at the 2022 GMA Dove Awards.

== Background ==
Maverick City Music released "Breathe" on June 4, 2021, as the lead single from Jubilee: Juneteenth Edition, exclusively on Apple Music. Apple Music selected the song as part of its specially curated playlist of songs to honor Juneteenth 2021 titled Juneteenth 2021: Freedom Songs. Jonathan McReynolds shared the story behind the song, saying: "Chandler [Moore] was praying in the session and talking about how the events that have taken place in America have a lot of us—especially Black men—waiting for the next shoe to drop. As we began writing our way through it, we just realized this connection to all of the breaths that have been snuffed out over the past years because of racism and discrimination. So the first idea was centered around us bracing ourselves for the next issue, the next trending topic, the next killing, the next trial, and how necessary it is for us as believers—and just people in general—to make sure that we don’t miss out on living, praising, and believing because of worry."

== Composition ==
"Breathe" is composed in the key of D♭ with a tempo of 74 beats per minute and a musical time signature of 4/4.

== Accolades ==
Awards
Year	Organization	Award	Result	Ref
2022	GMA Dove Awards	Gospel Worship Recorded Song of the Year	Won	

== Chart performance ==
"Breathe" debuted at number 35 on the US Hot Christian Songs chart and number 12 on the Hot Gospel Songs chart dated July 3, 2021.

== Music video ==
Maverick City Music released the music video for "Breathe" featuring Chandler Moore, Jonathan McReynolds and Doe through Apple Music exclusively on June 18, 2021. On February 11, 2022, Tribl Records published the music video for "Breathe" on YouTube.

== Performances ==
On February 18, 2022, Maverick City Music performed on "Breathe" on The Kelly Clarkson Show.

== Charts ==
=== Weekly charts ===
Weekly chart performance for "Breathe"
Chart (2021–2022)	Peak position
US Hot Christian Songs (Billboard)	31
US Gospel Songs (Billboard)	10

=== Year-end charts ===
Year-end chart performance for "Breathe"
Chart (2022)	Position
US Gospel Songs (Billboard)	45

== Release history ==
Region	Date	Format	Label	Ref.
Various	June 4, 2021	Digital download; streaming	Tribl Records	
