= Wait on You =

2021 song by Elevation Worship and Maverick City Music

Promotional single by Elevation Worship and Maverick City Music featuring Dante Bowe and Chandler Moore

from the album Old Church Basement
- Released: April 23, 2021
- Recorded: 2021
- Genre: Contemporary worship music
- Length: 9:24
- Label: Elevation Worship
- Songwriter(s): Brandon Lake; Chandler Moore; Chris Brown; Dante Bowe; Steven Furtick; Tiffany Hudson
- Producer(s): Chris Brown; Steven Furtick; Jason Ingram; Tony Brown; Jonathan Jay

Music video
- "Wait on You" on YouTube
- "Wait on You" (Lyrics) on YouTube

"Wait on You" is a song performed by American contemporary worship bands Elevation Worship and Maverick City Music, which features vocals from Dante Bowe and Chandler Moore. The song was released on April 23, 2021, as a promotional single from their collaborative live album, Old Church Basement (2021). The song was written by Brandon Lake, Chandler Moore, Chris Brown, Dante Bowe, Steven Furtick, and Tiffany Hudson.

"Wait on You" debuted at No. 9 on the US Hot Christian Songs chart, and at No. 1 on the Hot Gospel Songs chart. It has been certified gold by Recording Industry Association of America (RIAA). "Wait on You" was nominated for the Grammy Award for Best Gospel Performance/Song at the 2022 Grammy Awards.

== Background ==
On April 23, 2021, Elevation Worship and Maverick City Music released "Wait on You" featuring Dante Bowe and Chandler Moore as the third and final promotional single from their collaborative live album, Old Church Basement, along with its accompanying music video.

The song was described as a "a declaration of God’s faithfulness, even when circumstances may be discouraging." The song's theme draws inspiration from the bible in Isaiah 40:31, which says "They that wait upon the Lord shall renew their strength; they shall mount up with wings as eagles; they shall run, and not be weary, and they shall walk, and not faint."

== Composition ==
"Wait on You" is composed in the key of D with a tempo of 104 beats per minute, and a musical time signature of 12/8.

== Commercial performance ==
"Wait on You" debuted at No. 9 on the US Hot Christian Songs chart and at No. 1 on the Hot Gospel Songs chart, both dated May 8, 2021. "Wait on You" attracted 2.1 million streams and 3,000 downloads in the United States in its first week. "Wait on You" is Elevation Worship's ninth top ten entry on Hot Christian Songs, Maverick City Music's third top ten entry, Dante Bowe's first top ten entry, and Chandler Moore's second top ten entry.

== Accolades ==
Awards
Year	Organization	Award	Result	Ref
2022	Grammy Awards	Best Gospel Performance/Song	Nominated	

== Music videos ==
On April 23, 2021, Elevation Worship released the official music video of "Wait on You" on their YouTube channel. The video shows Dante Bowe and Chandler Moore leading the song.

On April 30, 2021, Elevation Worship published the lyric video of the song on YouTube.

== Charts ==
=== Weekly charts ===
Weekly chart performance for "Wait on You"
Chart (2021)	Peak position
New Zealand Hot Singles (RMNZ)	34
US Christian Airplay (Billboard)	42
US Christian Songs (Billboard)	9
US Gospel Songs (Billboard)	1
US Digital Song Sales (Billboard)	39

=== Year-end charts ===
Year-end chart performance for "Wait on You"
Chart (2021)	Position
US Christian Songs (Billboard)	61
US Gospel Songs (Billboard)	21

== Certifications ==
Region	Certification	Certified units/sales
United States (RIAA)	Gold	500,000^{‡}
^{‡} Sales+streaming figures based on certification alone.

== Release history ==
Region	Date	Format	Label	Ref.
Various	April 23, 2021	Digital download (promotional release); streaming (promotional release)	Elevation Worship Records	
