= Chandler Moore =

American Christian musician and worship leader

- Born: Chandler David Moore; March 21, 1995 (age 31); Charleston, South Carolina, U.S.
- Genres: Contemporary worship; contemporary gospel
- Occupations: Singer; songwriter; pianist; guitarist; worship pastor
- Instruments: Vocals; piano; guitar
- Years active: 2014–present
- Label: Tribl
- Member of: Sons of Sunday
- Formerly of: Maverick City Music
- Website: Official website

Chandler David Moore (born March 21, 1995) is an American singer, songwriter, pianist, guitarist, and worship leader. Moore was a member of Maverick City Music from 2019 to 2025.

Maverick City Music released two projects in 2019 followed by an additional 11 projects. Moore's collaborations include "Man of Your Word" with KJ Scriven and "Voice of God" with Dante Bowe and Steffany Gretzinger. On the collaborative album Old Church Basement with Elevation Worship, Moore sang "Jireh" alongside Naomi Raine and "Wait on You" with Bowe. Each song debuted as a chart topper. Moore continues to collaborate with mega and pop artists, including Justin Bieber and Tori Kelly.

== Early life ==
Chandler David Moore was born on March 21, 1995, to Bishop Brian David Moore and Elder Jametta Chandler Moore in Charleston, South Carolina. Moore grew up going to church where his father was a pastor. Later in life, when Moore was a music director at a small church in his hometown, he says he experienced a personal encounter with God, which inspired a passion for studying the Bible. Moore then became a background vocalist for Travis Greene and Tye Tribbett and penned songs for Bri Babineaux and Tribbett. Additionally, Moore has begun actively pursuing a solo career and released several singles leading up to his first solo album, Feelings, which released in 2020.

== Career ==
Chandler Moore released his debut single, "Never Runs Out", on June 20, 2014, independently. On December 26, 2014, Moore released his second single, "Our Hope". On June 23, 2017, Moore featured alongside Bri Babineaux on her single "What You Don't Realize". On March 23, 2018, Moore released the single "What a Friend".

On July 3, 2020, Moore featured All Nations Music's "Bless Your Name", which was released to Gospel radio as the lead single to their debut album Come Alive (2020). "Bless Your Name" peaked at No. 25 on the Hot Gospel Songs chart. Maverick City Music released "Man of Your Word" which featured Moore alongside KJ Scriven, to Christian radio as the lead single from their debut album, on August 21, 2020. "Man of Your Word" peaked at No. 18 on the Hot Christian Songs chart. On September 30, 2020, Moore featured on Dante Bowe's single, "Voice of God", alongside Steffany Gretzinger. "Voice of God" peaked at No. 36 on the Hot Christian Songs chart. On October 30, 2020, Moore was featured on Nathaniel Bassey's single, "Olorun Agbaye - You Are Mighty", alongside Oba. On November 13, 2020, Moore released his debut visual album, Feelings. Feelings debuted at number four on Billboard's Top Gospel Albums chart.

On February 5, 2021, Moore and Essential Worship released their version of Hillsong Worship's hit song "King of Kings" as a single. On March 26, 2021, Elevation Worship and Maverick City Music released "Jireh", which Moore featured on with Naomi Raine, as the first promotional single from their collaborative live album, Old Church Basement. "Jireh" concurrently debuted at No. 10 on the US Hot Christian Songs chart and at No. 1 on the Hot Gospel Songs chart, thus becoming Moore's first appearance in the top ten for both charts, and his first Hot Gospel Songs chart-topper. Moore alongside Dante Bowe featured on "Wait on You" by Elevation Worship and Maverick City Music, which was released as the third promotional single from Old Church Basement (2021), on April 23, 2021. "Wait on You" debuted at No. 9 on the US Hot Christian Songs chart and at No. 1 on the Hot Gospel Songs chart.

Chandler Moore was nominated for two GMA Dove Awards at the 2021 GMA Dove Awards, being nominated for Gospel Worship Recorded Song of the Year for "Voice of God" by Dante Bowe alongside Steffany Gretzinger, and Worship Recorded Song of the Year for "Jireh" by Elevation Worship and Maverick City Music alongside Naomi Raine. Moore also received four Grammy Award nominations in the lead-up to the 2022 Grammy Awards: two nominations in the Best Gospel Performance/Song category for featuring on "Voice of God" and a songwriting nomination for "Wait on You" by Elevation Worship and Maverick City Music; two Best Contemporary Christian Music Performance/Song for "Man of Your Word" alongside KJ Scriven and for featuring on "Jireh".

On August 2, 2025, Moore released his self-titled, sophomore solo album "Chandler Moore: Live in Los Angeles", featuring Israel Houghton, Naomi Raine, and Tasha Cobbs Leonard. The album hit No. 1 on the Top Gospel Albums chart and No. 4 on the Top Christian Albums chart, with its lead single "Lead Me On" scoring Moore his first solo No. 1 on the Gospel Airplay Chart. Moore embarked on his first solo tour to Europe and Africa in Spring 2025, inspired by the album's most streamed song "Omemma", which Moore co-wrote with Tim Godfrey.

On October 6, 2025, Chandler Moore announced his departure from Maverick City Music. He stated the following about his exit from the worship music collective in an Instagram post: "When we started Mav, I was grateful to have community and belonging while fulfilling my dream of making music that would help people experience God. And we did that…in ways I couldn’t have imagined.... This transition isn’t easy. Maverick is something I poured my heart into, so it’s almost like saying goodbye to your own kid.... My dream hasn’t changed. I’m stepping into this next phase ready to share my story and make music that helps people feel a little more human, a little more understood, and a little less alone."

== Personal life ==
Moore currently resides in Dallas, Texas, with his wife and family.

On June 19, 2017, Moore's son, named Chandler D. Moore II (affectionately called Deuce), was born. Moore posts photos with his son on his social media platforms. According to People magazine, Moore also has a son named River.

On January 17, 2021, Moore's apartment was badly damaged in a fire while he was attending a church service.

Moore became engaged to Hannah Poole in March 2021. Moore and Poole got married on June 9, 2021, during a wedding ceremony held at The 4 Eleven in Fort Worth, Texas. They have two children together, Krue, born 2022, and Preston, born 2023.

== Discography ==
=== Studio albums ===
List of studio albums, with selected chart positions
Title	Album details	Peak chart positions
Title	Album details	US Gospel
Feelings	Debut album; Released: November 13, 2020; Label: MoWorks/Identify Creative Group; Format: Digital download, streaming	4

=== Singles ===
==== As lead artist ====
List of singles and peak chart positions
Title	Year	Peak positions		Album
Title	Year	US Christ	US Gospel	Album
"Never Runs Out"	2014	—	—	Non-album singles
"Our Hope"	2014	—	—	Non-album singles
"What a Friend"	2018	—	—	Non-album singles
"King of Kings" (with Essential Worship)	2021	—	22	Awake
"It's The Most Wonderful Time of the Year"	2021	—	—	Non-album singles
"Anymore" (with the World Famous Tony Williams)	2021	—	—	Non-album singles
"Worthy of My Song (Worthy of It All)" (with Maverick City Music and Phil Wickham featuring Mav City Gospel Choir)	2022	27	11	The Maverick Way Complete
"No Longer Bound (I'm Free) (Forrest Frank cover)" (with Forrest Frank and Maverick City Music)	2023	19	5	The Maverick Way Complete
"—" denotes a recording that did not chart.

==== As featured artist ====
List of singles and peak chart positions
2019	Year	Peak positions		Album
2019	Year	US Christ	US Gospel	Album
"Wait on You" (Elevation Worship and Maverick City Music featuring Dante Bowe and Chandler Moore)	2021	9	1	Mercy
"Kingdom" (Maverick City Music and Kirk Franklin featuring Naomi Raine and Chandler Moore)	2022	17	7	Kingdom Book One

=== Other charted songs ===
List of songs and peak chart positions
Title	Year	Peak positions		Album
Title	Year	US Christ	US Gospel	Album
"Yahweh" (All Nations Music featuring Matthew Stevenson and Chandler Moore)	2021	—	— (Note: "Yahweh" did not enter the Hot Gospel Songs chart, but peaked at number 8 on the Gospel Digital Song Sales chart.)	Wait on You
"Trust in God"	2023	46	25	Move Your Heart (EP)
"All She Wrote" (Justin Bieber featuring Brandon Love and Chandler Moore)	2023	30	—	Freedom
"Where You Go I Follow" (Justin Bieber featuring Pink Sweats, Chandler Moore and Judah Smith)	2023	25	—	Freedom
"Where Do I Fit In" (Justin Bieber featuring Tori Kelly, Chandler Moore and Judah Smith)	2023	22	—	Freedom
"Shall Not Want" (Elevation Worship and Maverick City Music featuring Chandler Moore)	2023	90	8	Old Church Basement
"Fear Is Not My Future" (Maverick City Music and Kirk Franklin featuring Brandon Lake and Chandler Moore)	2022	23	11	Kingdom Book One
"Jealous" (Maverick City Music and Kirk Franklin featuring Chandler Moore and Lizzie Morgan)	2022	47	—	Kingdom Book One
"Talkin Bout (Love)" (Maverick City Music and Kirk Franklin featuring Chandler Moore and Lizzie Morgan)	2022	46	—	Kingdom Book One
"—" denotes a recording that did not chart.

=== Other appearances ===
Title	Year	Album	Ref.
"Just Want You" (Travis Greene featuring Jordan Connell and Chandler Moore)	2015	The Hill	
"While I'm Waiting" (Travis Greene featuring Chandler Moore)	2017	Crossover: Live from Music City	
"Give Thanks" (Tye Tribbett featuring Chandler Moore)	2017	The Bloody Win	
"Stand and Proclaim" (Benita Jones featuring Chandler Moore)	2018	The Evolution (EP)	
"Stand and Proclaim (Reprise)" (Benita Jones featuring Chandler Moore)	2018	The Evolution (EP)	
"Come Holy Spirit" (Enrique Holmes featuring Chandler Moore)	2018	Try Again	
"Never Be Altarless Again Flow" (Shelene Huey-Booker featuring Chandler Moore)	2018	Songs from the Altar	
"Open to Be Broken" (Shelene Huey-Booker featuring Chandler Moore)	2018	Songs from the Altar	
"Open to Be Broken Flow" (Shelene Huey-Booker featuring Chandler Moore)	2018	Songs from the Altar	
"You're Welcome In This Place" (Maverick City Music featuring Naomi Raine and Chandler Moore)	2019	Maverick City, Vol. 1	
"Refiner" (Maverick City Music featuring Chandler Moore and Steffany Gretzinger)	2019	Maverick City, Vol. 2	
"Most Beautiful / So in Love" (Maverick City Music featuring Chandler Moore)	2019	Maverick City, Vol. 2	
"More to Me" (Steffany Gretzinger featuring Chandler Moore)	2020	Forever Amen	
"This Close" (Steffany Gretzinger featuring Chandler Moore)	2020	Forever Amen	
"Fill the Room" (Maverick City Music featuring Chandler Moore)	2020	Maverick City Vol. 3 Part 1	
"Lean Back" (Maverick City Music featuring Amanda Lindsey Cook and Chandler Moore)	2020	Maverick City Vol. 3 Part 1	
"Thank You" (Maverick City Music featuring Steffany Gretzinger and Chandler Moore)	2020	Maverick City Vol. 3 Part 1	
"Have My Heart" (Maverick City Music featuring Chris Brown and Chandler Moore)	2020	Maverick City Vol. 3 Part 1	
"My Heart Your Home" (Maverick City Music featuring Alton Eugene and Chandler Moore)	2020	Maverick City Vol. 3 Part 1	
"Hope and a Future" (Housefires featuring Nate Moore and Chandler Moore)	2020	Housefires + Friends	
"Audience of One" (Unlshd Worship featuring Chandler Moore)	2020	Heaven Is Coming	
"Taste & See" (Jonathan Ferguson featuring Chandler Moore)	2020	Revival Culture Worship Lab	
"Taste & See Reprise" (Jonathan Ferguson featuring Chandler Moore)	2020	Revival Culture Worship Lab	
"Glimpse of Heaven" (Jonathan Ferguson featuring Chandler Moore)	2020	Revival Culture Worship Lab	
"Open Door" (Jonathan Ferguson featuring Chandler Moore)	2020	Revival Culture Worship Lab	
"Surrender" (Latasha Tudman featuring Alexis Carter and Chandler Moore)	2020	Freedom	
"To You" (Maverick City Music featuring Chandler Moore and Maryanne J. George)	2020	Maverick City, Vol. 3 Pt. 2	
"Yahweh" (Maverick City Music featuring Chandler Moore and Osby Berry)	2020	Maverick City, Vol. 3 Pt. 2	
"Most High (Spontaneous)" (Maverick City Music featuring Chandler Moore)	2020	Maverick City, Vol. 3 Pt. 2	
"Isaiah Song" (Maverick City Music featuring Chandler Moore)	2020	Maverick City, Vol. 3 Pt. 2	
"Yes & Amen" (Maverick City Music featuring Chandler Moore)	2020	Maverick City, Vol. 3 Pt. 2	
"You Hold It All Together" (Maverick City Music and Upperroom featuring Chandler Moore and Elyssa Smith)	2020	You Hold It All Together	
"Take It All Away" (Maverick City Music and Upperroom featuring Chandler Moore)	2020	You Hold It All Together	
"O Come Let Us Adore Him" (Maverick City Music featuring Chandler Moore and Jekalyn Carr)	2020	Maverick City Christmas	
"Is He Worthy/Agnus Dei/We Fall Down" (Maverick City Music featuring Chandler Moore and Nate Moore)	2020	Maverick City Christmas	
"I Want to See You" (Maverick City Music and Upperroom featuring Chandler Moore)	2021	Move Your Heart (EP)	
"Your Blood Is Strong Enough" (Maverick City Music and Upperroom featuring Chandler Moore)	2021	Move Your Heart (EP)	
"Into a Breakthrough" (Jonathan Ferguson featuring Chandler Moore)	2021	Worship Lab (Deluxe)	
"The Enemy's Defeated" (Jonathan Ferguson featuring Chandler Moore)	2021	Worship Lab (Deluxe)	
"Nothing Else Spontaneous" (House Worship featuring Chandler Moore)	2021	House Worship Live	
"Hear Us from Heaven" (House Worship featuring Chandler Moore)	2021	House Worship Live	
"Fill the Room" (House Worship featuring Chandler Moore)	2021	House Worship Live	
"The Blood Is Still the Blood" (Maverick City Music featuring Chandler Moore, Nicole Binion and Ryan Ofei)	2021	Jubilee (EP)	
"The Blood Is Still the Blood Reprise" (Maverick City Music featuring Chandler Moore, Nicole Binion and Ryan Ofei)	2021	Jubilee (EP)	
"Hymn Medley" (Maverick City Music featuring Chandler Moore)	2021	Jubilee (EP)	
"Awesome" (Charles Jenkins featuring Osby Berry, Chandler Moore and Maverick City Music)	2021	My Very OWN Easter (EP)	
"How Great Medley, He's a Wonder" (Israel & New Breed featuring Chandler Moore)	2021	Feels Like Home, Vol. 2	
"Wait on You (Reprise)" (Elevation Worship and Maverick City Music featuring Dante Bowe and Chandler Moore)	2021	Old Church Basement	
"Not Better, Just Different" (Tribl featuring Chandler Moore)	2021	Tribl Nights Atlanta	
"Away in a Manger / Worthy is Your Name" (Maverick City Music featuring Kim Walker-Smith, Chandler Moore and Mav City Gospel Choir)	2021	A Very Maverick Christmas	
"Go Tell It on the Mountain" (Maverick City Music featuring Melvin Crispell III, Chandler Moore and Mav City Gospel Choir)	2021	A Very Maverick Christmas	
"Gonna Tell Somebody (Spontaneous)" (Maverick City Music featuring Melvin Crispell III, Isaac Carree, Lizzie Morgan, Chandler Moore and Mav City Gospel Choir)	2021	A Very Maverick Christmas	
"Mary Did You Know?" (Maverick City Music featuring Chandler Moore, Lizzie Morgan and Mav City Gospel Choir)		A Very Maverick Christmas	
"Best Part" (Maverick City Music featuring Naomi Raine, Chandler Moore & Mav City Gospel Choir)		A Very Maverick Christmas	
"Fear Is Not My Future" (Brandon Lake and Chandler Moore)	2022	Help!	
"The One You Love" (Maverick City Music and Kirk Franklin featuring Brandon Lake, Dante Bowe and Chandler Moore)	2022	Kingdom Book One	
"My Life Is in Your Hands" (Maverick City Music and Kirk Franklin featuring Chandler Moore)	2022	Kingdom Book One	
"Melodies from Heaven" (Maverick City Music and Kirk Franklin featuring Chandler Moore and Maryanne J. George)	2022	Kingdom Book One	
"Take Me Back" (Maverick City Music and Kirk Franklin featuring Dante Bowe, Chandler Moore and Ryan Ofei)	2022	Kingdom Book One	

== Awards and nominations ==
=== GMA Dove Awards ===
Year	Nominee / work	Award	Result	Ref.
2020	"Only You Can Satisfy (Live)" (Note: Moore is credited as a co-writer of "Only You Can Satisfy (Live)" performed by William McDowell and Chris Lawson.) (William McDowell and Chris Lawson)	Gospel Worship Recorded Song of the Year	Nominated	
2021	"Voice of God" (Dante Bowe featuring Steffany Gretzinger and Chandler Moore)	Gospel Worship Recorded Song of the Year	Nominated	
2021	"Jireh" (Elevation Worship and Maverick City Music featuring Chandler Moore and Naomi Raine)	Song of the Year	Nominated	
2022	"Jireh" (Elevation Worship and Maverick City Music featuring Chandler Moore and Naomi Raine)	Worship Recorded Song of the Year	Nominated	
2022	Jubilee: Juneteenth Edition (Note: Lake was credited as a producer on Jubilee: Juneteenth Edition by Maverick City Music.) (Maverick City Music)	Contemporary Gospel Album of the Year	Nominated	
2022	"Breathe" (Maverick City Music featuring Doe, Jonathan McReynolds, Chandler Moore)	Gospel Worship Recorded Song of the Year	Won	
2022	Lion (Note: Moore was credited as a producer on Lion by Elevation Worship.) (Elevation Worship)	Worship Album of the Year	Nominated	
2023	"Jireh (My Provider)" (Note: Moore was credited as a co-writer on "Jireh (My Provider)" by Limoblaze featuring Lecrae, Happi.) (Limoblaze featuring Lecrae, Happi)	Rap/Hip Hop Recorded Song of the Year	Nominated	
2023	Kingdom Book One (Deluxe) (Note: Moore was credited as a producer on Kingdom Book One (Deluxe) by Maverick City Music and Kirk Franklin).) (Maverick City Music, Kirk Franklin)	Contemporary Gospel Album of the Year	Won	
2023	"Fear Is Not My Future (Radio Version)" (Maverick City Music featuring Brandon Lake, Chandler Moore)	Worship Recorded Song of the Year	Nominated	
2024	"Firm Foundation (He Won't)" (as writer)	Song of the Year	Nominated	
2024	"More Than Able" (as writer)	Song of the Year	Nominated	
2024	"Praise" (as writer)	Song of the Year	Nominated	
2024	Himself	Songwriter of the Year - Artist	Nominated	
2024	"God Problems" (Maverick City featuring Naomi Caine and Chandler Moore)	Contemporary Gospel Recorded Song of the Year	Won	
2024	Father's Day (as producer)	Contemporary Gospel Album of the Year	Won	
2024	"Alaba" (as writer)	Spanish Language Worship Recorded Song of the Year	Nominated	
2024	"Firm Foundation (He Won't) [Live]" (as writer)	Worship Recorded Song of the Year	Nominated	
2024	"Praise" (Elevation Worship featuring Brandon Lake, Chris Brown, and Chandler Moore)	Worship Recorded Song of the Year	Won	
2024	Can You Imagine? (as producer)	Worship Album of the Year	Nominated	
2025	When Wind Meets Fire (as producer)	Worship Album of the Year	Won	
2025	Chandler Moore: Live in Los Angeles	Gospel Worship Album of the Year	Won	
2025	Algo Nuevo Viene (as producer)	Spanish Language Album of the Year	Nominated	
2026	Himself	Songwriter of the Year	Pending	

=== Grammy Awards ===
Year	Nominee / work	Award	Result	Ref.
2022	"Voice of God" (Dante Bowe featuring Steffany Gretzinger and Chandler Moore)	Best Gospel Performance/Song	Nominated	
2022	"Wait on You" (Note: Moore is credited as a co-writer of "Wait on You" performed by Elevation Worship and Maverick City Music.)	Best Gospel Performance/Song	Nominated	
2022	"Man of Your Word" (with KJ Scriven)	Best Contemporary Christian Music Performance/Song	Nominated	
2022	"Jireh" (Elevation Worship and Maverick City Music featuring Chandler Moore and Naomi Raine)	Best Contemporary Christian Music Performance/Song	Nominated	
2022	Jubilee: Juneteenth Edition (Note: Moore is credited as a member of Maverick City Music.)	Best Gospel Album	Nominated	
2022	Old Church Basement	Best Contemporary Christian Music Album	Won	
2023	"Kingdom" (with Kirk Franklin)	Best Gospel Performance/Song	Won	
2023	Kingdom Book One (with Kirk Franklin)	Best Gospel Album	Won	
2023	"God Really Loves Us (Radio Version)" (Crowder featuring Dante Bowe and Maverick City Music)	Best Contemporary Christian Music Performance/Song	Nominated	
2023	"Fear Is Not My Future" (with Kirk Franklin)	Best Contemporary Christian Music Performance/Song	Won	
2023	Breathe	Best Contemporary Christian Music Album	Won	
2024	The Maverick Way	Best Gospel Album	Nominated	
2024	"God Problems"	Best Contemporary Christian Music Performance/Song	Nominated	
2025	"In The Room"	Best Contemporary Christian Music Performance/Song	Nominated	
2025	"In The Name of Jesus"	Best Contemporary Christian Music Performance/Song	Nominated	
2025	"Praise"	Best Contemporary Christian Music Performance/Song	Nominated	
2025	The Maverick Way Complete	Best Contemporary Christian Music Album	Nominated	
