= Naomi Raine =

American Christian and gospel singer, songwriter and worship leader

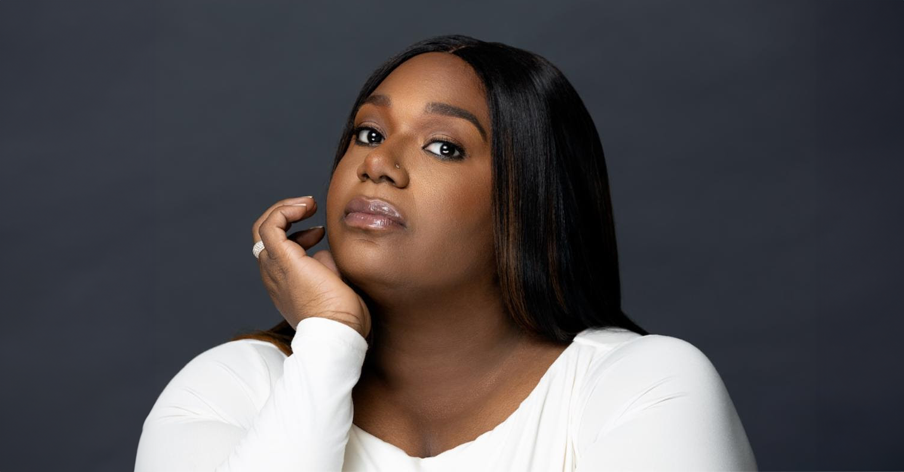
- Worship singer Naomi Raine in 2023

Background information
- Born: Naomi Raine; April 9, 1987 (age 39); New York City, New York, U.S.
- Genres: Contemporary worship; contemporary gospel
- Occupations: Singer; songwriter; worship pastor
- Instrument: Vocals
- Years active: 2016–present
- Label: Tribl
- Member of: ReFresh Worship
- Website: Official website

Naomi Raine Solomon (born April 9, 1987) is an American Christian and gospel singer, songwriter, and worship leader. She was a member of Maverick City Music collective from 2019 to 2025.

== Career ==
Raine made her debut with Maverick City Music in 2019, releasing two projects that year. As of September 2022, they had released an additional 11 projects. As a member of Maverick City Music, Raine was a part of the "Welcome to Maverick City," "Kingdom," "The Maverick Way," and "Good News" tours in the United States.

On July 8, 2022, Raine released her solo album “Journey” through TRIBL Records. “Journey” consists of 15 songs produced by Raine with G. Morris Coleman.

In Spring 2023, Raine embarked on the "It's Time" tour, along with Tasha Cobbs Leonard, Natalie Grant, and TAYA. The tour spanned over 20 cities across the United States, and Raine and her fellow, female worship leaders were later joined by Tamela Mann and Katie Torwalt on the tour.

On June 2, 2023, Raine released her debut live album "Cover The Earth (Live In New York)" which features Natalie Grant, Todd Dulaney, Chandler Moore, and Lizzie Morgan. Produced by Adale Jackson, "Cover The Earth" consists of 14 songs, including "One Name (Jesus)," the album's lead single.

On August 29, 2025, Raine released her sophomore live album "Jesus Over Everything (Live In Las Vegas)" which features Seph Schlueter, Chandler Moore, Todd Galberth, Tasha Cobbs Leonard, Ryan Avery, Enrique Holmes, Christine D'Clario, and Anike. "Jesus Over Everything" consists of 16 songs, including the albums lead singles "Be Glad" and her remix of "God Will Work It Out".

On October 6, 2025, Raine announced that she was no longer a part of Maverick City Music. She said the following about her departure from the worship music collective: "Being a part of Mav truly changed my life! What started as a group of folks singing in a shed has turned into something I could’ve never even imagined!... Every song I was a part of was written and sung from a pure place, just me wanting to please God. And now I believe God has given me the green light to step into what He’s calling me to do individually. Still writing. Still singing. Still worshipping and leading others in worship – just on my own."

== Awards and nominations ==
=== Billboard Music Awards ===
| Year | Nominee / work | Award | Result | Ref. |
|---|---|---|---|---|
| 2022 | "Jireh" (Elevation Worship and Maverick City Music featuring Chandler Moore and Naomi Raine) | Top Gospel Song | Nominated | |

=== GMA Dove Awards ===
| Year | Nominee / work | Award | Result | Ref. |
|---|---|---|---|---|
| 2021 | "Jireh" (Elevation Worship and Maverick City Music featuring Chandler Moore and Naomi Raine) | Worship Recorded Song of the Year | Nominated | |
| 2022 | "Jireh" (Maverick City Music featuring Chandler Moore and Naomi Raine) | Song of the Year | Nominated | |
| 2022 | "Jireh" (Maverick City Music featuring Chandler Moore and Naomi Raine) | Worship Recorded Song of the Year | Nominated | |
| 2023 | Naomi Raine | New Artist of the Year | Nominated | |
| 2023 | "Jireh (My Provider)" (Note: Raine was credited as a co-writer on "Jireh (My Provider)" by Limoblaze, featuring Lecrae, Happi.) (Limoblaze, featuring Lecrae, Happi) | Rap/Hip Hop Recorded Song of the Year | Nominated | |
| 2023 | "One Name (Jesus) [Live]" | Gospel Worship Recorded Song of the Year | Nominated | |
| 2024 | Naomi Raine | Songwriter of the Year - Artist | Nominated | |
| 2024 | "More Than Able" (Note: Raine was credited as a co-writer on "More Than Able" by Elevation Worship.) (Elevation Worship featuring Chandler Moore and Tiffany Hudson) | Song of the Year | Nominated | |
| 2024 | "God Problems" (Note: Raine was credited as a co-writer on "God Problems" by Maverick City Music.) (Maverick City Music featuring Naomi Raine, Chandler Moore) | Contemporary Gospel Recorded Song of the Year | Won | |
| 2024 | "The Story I'll Tell (Live)" | Gospel Worship Recorded Song of the Year | Won | |
| 2024 | Cover the Earth (Live in New York) | Gospel Worship Album of the Year | Nominated | |

=== Grammy Awards ===
| Year | Nominee / work | Award | Result | Ref. |
|---|---|---|---|---|
| 2022 | "Wait on You" (Note: Raine is credited as a member of Maverick City Music.) (Elevation Worship and Maverick City Music) | Best Gospel Performance/Song | Nominated | |
| 2022 | Jubilee: Juneteenth Edition | Best Gospel Album | Nominated | |
| 2022 | "Jireh" (Elevation Worship and Maverick City Music featuring Chandler Moore and Naomi Raine) | Best Contemporary Christian Music Performance/Song | Nominated | |
| 2022 | Old Church Basement | Best Contemporary Christian Music Album | Won | |
| 2023 | "Kingdom" (with Kirk Franklin) | Best Gospel Performance/Song | Won | |
| 2023 | Kingdom Book One (with Kirk Franklin) | Best Gospel Album | Won | |
| 2023 | "God Really Loves Us (Radio Version)" (Crowder featuring Dante Bowe and Maverick City Music) | Best Contemporary Christian Music Performance/Song | Nominated | |
| 2023 | "Fear Is Not My Future" (with Kirk Franklin) | Best Contemporary Christian Music Performance/Song | Won | |
| 2023 | Breathe | Best Contemporary Christian Music Album | Won | |

=== Stellar Awards ===
| Year | Nominee / work | Award | Result | Ref. |
|---|---|---|---|---|
| 2026 | Jesus Over Everything | Praise and Worship Album of the Year | Pending | |
| 2026 | "Be Glad" | Praise And Worship Song of the Year | Pending | |

== See also ==
- List of Christian worship music artists
