= Todd Dulaney =

- Born: Todd Anthony Dulaney; December 20, 1983 (age 42); Maywood, Illinois
- Origin: Forest Park, Illinois
- Genres: CCM, gospel, traditional black gospel, urban contemporary gospel
- Occupations: Singer, songwriter
- Instruments: Vocals, singer-songwriter, guitar
- Years active: 2011–present
- Label: Entertainment One
- Website: todddulaneyland.com

Todd Anthony Dulaney (born December 20, 1983) is an American gospel musician, and former baseball player. His music career started in 2011, with the release of the CD version, Pulling Me Through. This would be his breakthrough released upon the Billboard Gospel Albums chart. He would release another album, A Worshipper's Heart, in 2016 with EntertainmentOne Nashville, and this would place even higher on the Gospel Albums chart.

== Early life ==
Dulaney was born on December 20, 1983, in Maywood, Illinois, as Todd Anthony Dulaney, to Thomas and Tommye Dulaney. He was athletic as a youth playing sports in particular baseball, where he would play at a local community college, Wabash Valley College, getting drafted by the New York Mets in the 2002 MLB June Amateur Draft as a 32nd round selection. He never reached the major leagues, but played his short stint as a professional baseball player in the minor leagues. He decided after the 2005 season to retire from the sport because he felt God's call to play gospel music, which he did under the tutelage of artist, Smokie Norful, who asked him to tour with him.

== Music career ==
Dulaney released his first album, Pulling Me Through, on May 31, 2011, independently. His album broke through quickly on the Billboard Gospel Albums chart, reaching #43. His next release, Pulling Me Through, was released by GoldStreet Gospel Records on January 22, 2013. This time it placed even higher at No. 23 on the aforementioned chart because it was released digitally along with extended content. He released A Worshipper's Heart on April 15, 2016, with Entertainment One Music. The album peaked at No. 1 on the Gospel Albums chart, while it got No. 150 on The Billboard 200 and No. 13 on the Independent Albums chart.

On June 11, 2021, Dulaney released the live album Anthems & Glory with Entertainment One Music. Dulaney earned his fifth Gospel Airplay No. 1 With 'Revelation 4' on the list dated September 25, 2021.

== Discography ==
List of selected studio albums, with selected chart positions
Title	Album details	Peak chart positions		
Title	Album details	US	US Gospel	US Indie
Pulling Me Through	Released: May 31, 2011; Label: Independent; CD	—	43	—
Pulling Me Through	Released: January 22, 2013; Label: GoldStreet Gospel; CD, digital download, extended content	—	23	—
A Worshipper's Heart	Released: April 15, 2016; Label: Entertainment One Worship; CD, digital download, extended content	150	1	13
Your Great Name	Released: January 19, 2018; Label: Entertainment One Worship; CD, digital download	183	1	5
Anthems & Glory	Released: June 11, 2021; Label: Entertainment One Worship; CD, digital download	—	3	—
