= Jenn Johnson =

American contemporary Christian musician and worship pastor

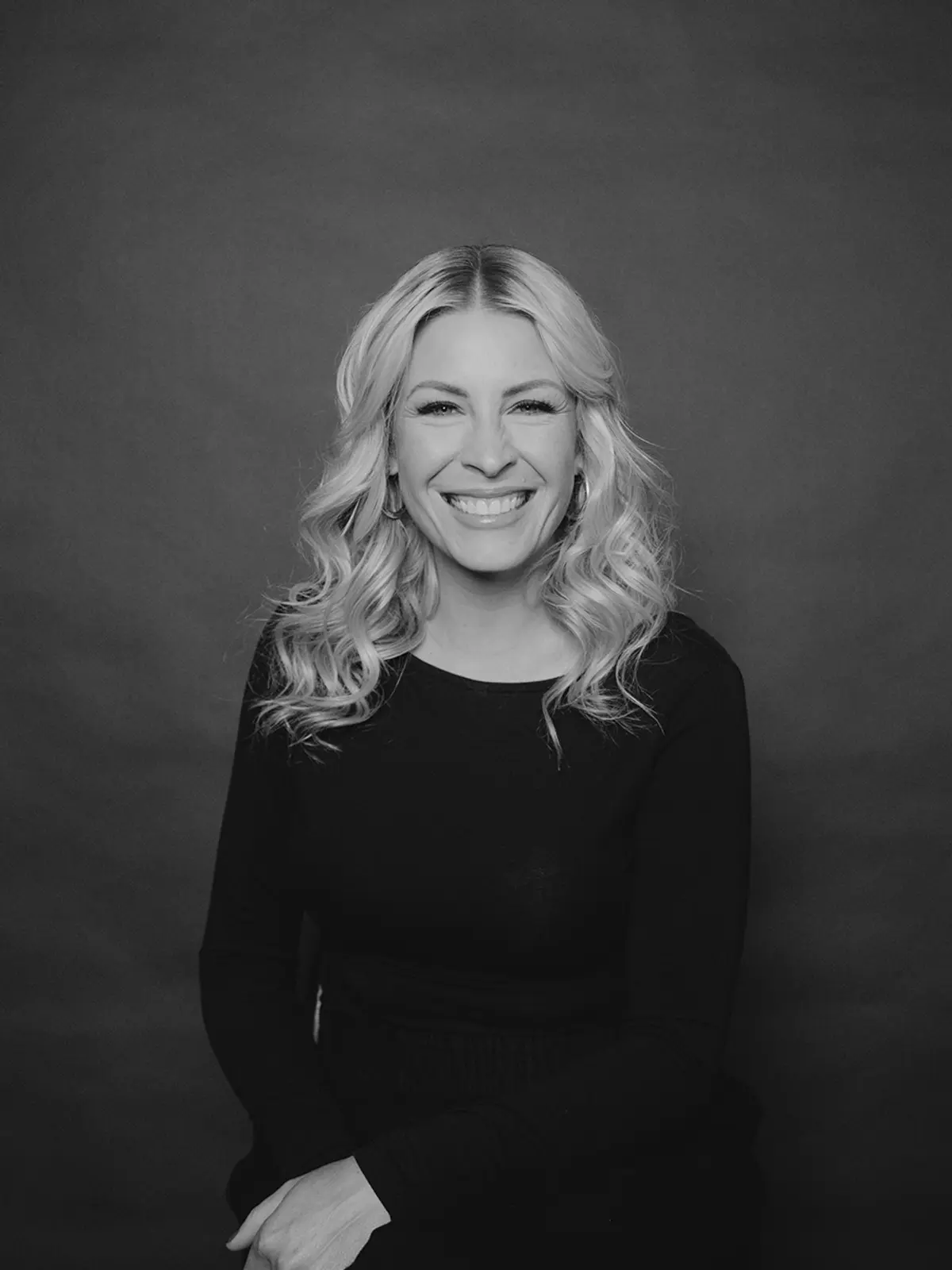

Background information
- Born: Jennifer Louise Rock; April 15, 1982 (age 44)
- Origin: Redding, California, U.S.
- Genres: Contemporary worship music; CCM
- Occupations: Singer; songwriter; worship pastor
- Instruments: Vocals; piano
- Years active: 2001–present
- Labels: Bethel Music; Kingsway Music
- Spouse: Brian Johnson (m. 2000)
- Website: jennjohnson.com

Jennifer "Jenn" Louise Johnson (née Rock, born April 15, 1982) is an American Christian worship singer, songwriter and worship pastor. She is a co-founding member of Bethel Music, and is one-half of the husband-and-wife worship duo Brian and Jenn Johnson. She is also a senior worship pastor at Bethel Church in Redding, California, and a Senior Overseer of WorshipU, an online school of worship sponsored by Bethel.

She is the daughter-in-law of Bethel pastor Bill Johnson. Together, she and her husband have released three live albums: Undone (2001), We Believe (2006), the duo's first release to appear on Billboard's Christian Albums chart, and Where You Go I Go (2008). The duo has also released one studio album, After All These Years (2017), which debuted on the US Billboard 200 at number 21. Johnson has also been featured on many Bethel Music collective albums.

== Career ==
In 2000, Johnson and her husband were appointed senior worship pastors at Bethel Church. The duo's debut album, Undone, was released in 2001 and featured Johnson's younger sister Leah Valenzuela. After a five-year hiatus, the Johnsons released their second live album, We Believe, on September 26, 2006. We Believe charted at No. 48 on the Billboard Top Christian Albums Chart, becoming the pair's first chart entry. On September 30, 2008, their third album, Where You Go I Go, was released on the Ion Records label.

On December 13, 2011, Bethel Music and Johnson released "Come to Me" as the lead single of Bethel's live album, The Loft Sessions (2012). The song peaked at number 14 on the US Christian Digital Songs Sales Chart. On September 6, 2013, "Chasing You" by Bethel Music, featuring Johnson's vocals, was released as the lead single of Bethel Music's first studio album, Tides (2013). The song peaked at number 13 on the US Christian Digital Songs Sales Chart.

The Johnsons released their fourth album, After All These Years, on January 27, 2017. The album debuted at number one on the Top Christian Albums chart having sold 16,000 equivalent album units in its first week of sales, while becoming the duo's first chart-topping album. On May 8, 2017, Johnson released "You're Gonna Be OK" as the lead single from After All These Years (2017). "You're Gonna Be OK" peaked at number 34 on the Hot Christian Songs chart.

On November 1, 2019, Johnson and Bethel Music released "Goodness of God" as the third single from Bethel's live album, Victory (2019). "Goodness of God" peaked at number 15 on the Hot Christian Songs chart. The song was nominated for the GMA Dove Award for Worship Recorded Song of the Year at the 2020 GMA Dove Awards.

On January 10, 2020, Johnson featured on the song "Famous For (I Believe)" released by Tauren Wells as the second single from Well's album, Citizen of Heaven (2020). The song peaked at number three on the Hot Christian Songs chart, registering as Johnson's first top ten single, and at number 15 on the Bubbling Under Hot 100 chart. "Famous For (I Believe)" was nominated for Grammy Award for Best Contemporary Christian Music Performance/Song at the 2021 Grammy Awards, and the Billboard Music Award for Top Christian Song at the 2021 Billboard Music Awards. On February 7, 2020, Johnson, alongside her husband and Bethel Music, released "God of Revival" as the lead single to Bethel's live album, Revival's in the Air (2020). "God of Revival" peaked at number 22 on the Hot Christian Songs chart. On April 18, 2020, Johnson was featured on the single "Joy Invincible" released by Switchfoot. "Joy Invincible" peaked at number 37 on the Hot Christian Songs chart.

== Personal life ==
Johnson married Brian in 2000.

The couple has biological children; daughters Haley and Téa, and son Braden. They adopted sons Ryder and Malachi.

The family resides on a farm in Redding, California.

Haley married William Parker on her childhood family farm in October 2021.

== Discography ==
=== Studio albums ===
Title	Details	Peak chart positions									
Title	Details	US	US Christ.	AUS	BEL	CAN	NLD	NOR	NZ	SCO	UK Down.
After All These Years (with Brian Johnson)	Released: January 27, 2017; Label: Bethel; Formats: CD, digital download, streaming	21	1	7	166	32	76	25	29	74	23
Happy	Released: May 22, 2026; Label: Bethel; Formats: CD, LP, digital download, streaming	—	—	—	—	—	—	—	—	—	—
"—" denotes a recording that did not chart or was not released in that territory.

=== Live albums ===
Title	Details	Peak chart positions
Title	Details	US Christ.
Where You Go I Go (with Brian Johnson)	Released: September 30, 2008; Label: ION Records; Formats: CD, digital download, streaming	—
We Believe (with Brian Johnson)	Released: September 26, 2006; Label: Bethel Music; Formats: CD, digital download, streaming	48
Undone (with Brian Johnson)	Released: September 18, 2001; Label: Bethel, Kingsway Music; Formats: CD, digital download, streaming	—
"—" denotes a recording that did not chart or was not released in that territory.

=== Singles ===
==== As lead artist ====
List of singles and peak chart positions
Title	Year	Chart positions				Certifications	Album
Title	Year	US Christ.	US Christ. Air.	US Christ. AC	US Christ. Digital	Certifications	Album
"Come to Me" (with Bethel Music)	2012	—	—	—	14		The Loft Sessions
"Chasing You" (with Bethel Music)	2013	—	—	—	13		Tides
"You're Gonna Be OK"	2017	34	—	—	17		After All These Years
"Goodness of God" (with Bethel Music)	2019	15	19	15	13	RIAA: Gold	Victory
"God of Revival" (with Bethel Music and Brian Johnson)	2020	22	17	26	5		Revival's in the Air
"Too Good to Not Believe" (with Brandon Lake)	2021	—	—	—	—		Non-album singles
"Holy Forever" (with CeCe Winans)	2024	—	—	—	—		Non-album singles
"—" denotes a recording that did not chart

==== As featured artist ====
List of singles and peak chart positions
Title	Year	Chart positions					Album
Title	Year	US Bubb.	US Christ.	US Christ. Air.	US Christ. AC	US Christ Digital	Album
"Famous For (I Believe)" (Tauren Wells featuring Jenn Johnson)	2020	15	3	1	2	5	Citizen of Heaven
"Joy Invincible" (Switchfoot featuring Jenn Johnson)	2020	—	37	49	—	—	Native Tongue
"—" denotes a recording that did not chart

=== Other charted songs ===
List of songs and peak chart positions
Title	Year	Chart positions		Album
Title	Year	US Christ	Christ Digital	Album
"Nearness" (Bethel Music and Jenn Johnson)	2015	48	—	We Will Not Be Shaken
"In Over My Head (Crash Over Me)" (Bethel Music and Jenn Johnson)	2015	26	11	We Will Not Be Shaken
"For the One"	2017	50	—	After All These Years
"Agnus Dei / King Of Kings" (with Hillsong Worship, Passion, Chidima, and Brooke Ligertwood)	2021	50	—	At Easter (EP)
"—" denotes a recording that did not chart

=== Promotional singles ===
Year	Song	Album
2017	"Mention of Your Name"	After All These Years
2017	"Gravity"	After All These Years
2026	"Here In Your Arms" (with Brian Johnson)	Happy
2026	"Walk With Me" (with Tiffany Hudson)	Happy
2026	"Mad at God"	Happy
2026	"Thank You Lord" (with Brooke Ligertwood)	Happy

=== Other appearances ===
Year	Song	Album	Ref.
2010	"I've Found a Love (Love Came Down)" (Bethel Music and Jenn Johnson)	Here Is Love	
2010	"I Love Your Presence" (Bethel Music and Jenn Johnson)	Here Is Love	
2010	"You Make Me Happy (Spontanteous)" (Bethel Music and Jenn Johnson)	Here Is Love	
2010	"I Love Your Presence" (Bethel Music and Jenn Johnson)	Here Is Love	
2010	"Here Is Love" (Bethel Music, Brian Johnson and Jenn Johnson)	Here Is Love	
2010	"We Are an Ark" (Dave Fitzgerald featuring Jenn Johnson)	Hope of Heaven: Live at Bethel Church	
2011	"God I Look to You" (Bethel Music and Jenn Johnson)	Be Lifted High	
2011	"What Would I Have Done" (Bethel Music, Brian Johnson and Jenn Johnson)	Be Lifted High	
2011	"Forever and a Day" (Bethel Music and Jenn Johnson)	Be Lifted High	
2011	"Love Divine" (Jenn Johnson)	Love Divine: The Songs of Charles Wesley For Today's Generation	
2012	"Our Father" (Bethel Music and Jenn Johnson)	For the Sake of the World	
2012	"Everything To You (Spontaneous)" (Bethel Music and Jenn Johnson)	For the Sake of the World	
2012	"I Really Love You (Spontaneous)" (Bethel Music, Brian Johnson and Jenn Johnson)	For the Sake of the World	
2012	"Who You Are" (Bethel Music and Jenn Johnson)	For the Sake of the World	
2013	"I Can Feel You" (Bethel Music and Jenn Johnson)	Tides	
2013	"For the Cross" (Bethel Music, Jenn Johnson and Brian Johnson)	Tides	
2014	"For the Cross" (Bethel Music, Jenn Johnson and Brian Johnson)	Tides Live	
2014	"Chasing You" (Bethel Music and Jenn Johnson)	Tides Live	
2014	"I Can Feel You" (Bethel Music and Jenn Johnson)	Tides Live	
2014	"A Little Longer" (Bethel Music and Jenn Johnson)	You Make Me Brave: Live at the Civic	
2014	"Joy of the Lord (Spontaneous)" (Bethel Music and Jenn Johnson)	You Make Me Brave: Live at the Civic	
2014	"Come to Me" (Bethel Music and Jenn Johnson)	You Make Me Brave: Live at the Civic	
2014	"We Step into Freedom (Spontaneous)" (Bethel Music and Jenn Johnson)	You Make Me Brave: Live at the Civic	
2016	"Heaven Come" (Bethel Music and Jenn Johnson)	Have It All	
2016	"Sweet Praise (Spontaneous)" (Bethel Music, Brian Johnson and Jenn Johnson)	Have It All	
2016	"Awaken Love (Remixed)" (Sean Feucht featuring Jenn Johnson)	The Things We Did at First	
2017	"For the One" (Bethel Music and Jenn Johnson)	Starlight	
2018	"Mighty Sound (Spontaneous)" (Bethel Music, Brian Johnson and Jenn Johnson)	Moments: Mighty Sound	
2018	"Come to Me (Spontaneous)" (Bethel Music, Jenn Johnson and Brian Johnson)	Moments: Mighty Sound	
2018	"In Over My Head (Spontaneous)" (Bethel Music and Jenn Johnson)	Moments: Mighty Sound	
2019	"Living Hope" (Bethel Music, Brian Johnson and Jenn Johnson)	Victory	
2019	"Padre Nuestro (Our Father)" (Bethel Music and Jenn Johnson featuring Marco Barrientos)	Bethel Music en Español	
2019	"Forever (We Sing Hallelujah)" (Phil Wickham featuring Brian Johnson and Jenn Johnson)	Singalong 4	
2019	"Living Hope" (Phil Wickham featuring Brian Johnson and Jenn Johnson)	Singalong 4	
2020	"Goodness of God" (Bethel Music and Jenn Johnson)	Peace	
2020	"I'll Be Everything" (Bethel Music and Jenn Johnson)	Peace	
2020	"Sing His Praise Again (Oh My Soul)" (Bethel Music and Jenn Johnson)	Revival's in the Air	
2020	"We Cry Holy (Spontaneous)" (Bethel Music and Jenn Johnson)	Revival's in the Air	
2020	"By the Grace of God" (Bethel Music, Brian Johnson and Jenn Johnson)	Revival's in the Air	
2021	"Send Me" (Bethel Music and Jenn Johnson featuring Chris Quilala)	Homecoming	
2021	"Envíame" (Bethel Music and Jenn Johnson featuring Chris Quilala)	Homecoming (Español)	
2021	"You're Gonna Be OK" (Bethel Music and Jenn Johnson)	Peace, Vol. II	
2021	"Battle Belongs" (Bethel Music, Brian Johnson and Jenn Johnson)	Peace, Vol. II	
2022	"The Blood" (Bethel Music, Jenn Johnson and Mitch Wong)	Simple	
2022	"Let My Life be Worship" (Bethel Music, Jenn Johnson and Michaela Gentile)	Simple	
2022	"In the Ordinary (Spontaneous) (Bethel Music, Jenn Johnson and Michaela Gentile)	Simple	
2022	"Simple" (Bethel Music, Brian Johnson and Jenn Johnson)	Simple	
2023	"Holy Forever" (Bethel Music and Jenn Johnson)	Come Up Here	
2023	"Come Up Here" (Bethel Music and Jenn Johnson)	Come Up Here	
2024	"When You Walk Into The Room (Spontaneous)" (Bethel Music, Jenn Johnson and David Funk)	Moments: Wait	
2024	"Holy Forever" (Bethel Music and Jenn Johnson)	Moments: Wait	
2024	"Give Me Jesus" (Bethel Music, Abbie Gamboa and Jenn Johnson)	Moments: Wait	
2024	"No One Like the Lord" (Bethel Music and Jenn Johnson)	We Must Respond	
2024	"Made for More" (Bethel Music, Jenn Johnson and Josh Baldwin)	We Must Respond	
2025	"The Church" (Bethel Music and Jenn Johnson)	We Must Respond	

== Filmography ==
- You Make Me Brave (2014) — as herself
- We Will Not Be Shaken (2015) — as herself

== Bibliography ==
- — (November 9, 2021). All Things Lovely: Inspiring Health and Wholeness in Your Home, Heart, and Community. Worthy. ISBN 978-1546001812.

== Awards and nominations ==
=== Billboard Music Awards ===
Year	Nominee / work	Award	Result	Ref.
2021	"Famous For (I Believe)" (with Tauren Wells)	Top Christian Song	Nominated	

=== GMA Dove Awards ===
Year	Nominee / work	Award	Result	Ref.
2015	"Forever (We Sing Hallelujah)" (Note: Johnson is credited as a co-writer of "Forever (We Sing Hallelujah)" performed by Kari Jobe.) (Kari Jobe)	Worship Recorded Song of the Year	Nominated	
2020	"Goodness of God"	Worship Recorded Song of the Year	Nominated	
2022	"You're Gonna Be OK" (Bethel Music featuring Jenn Johnson)	Inspirational Recorded Song of the Year	Nominated	
2022	"Goodness of God - Live" (Note: Johnson was credited as a co-writer on "Goodness of God" by CeCe Winans.) (CeCe Winans)	Gospel Worship Recorded Song of the Year	Nominated	
2023	"Goodness of God"	Song of the Year	Won	
2023	"Holy Forever" (Note: Johnson was credited as a co-writer on "Holy Forever" by Chris Tomlin.) (Chris Tomlin)	Worship Recorded Song of the Year	Nominated	
2023	"Holy Forever"	Short Form Video of the Year (Performance)	Nominated	

=== Grammy Awards ===
Year	Nominee / work	Award	Result	Ref.
2021	"Famous For (I Believe)" (with Tauren Wells)	Best Contemporary Christian Music Performance/Song	Nominated	
2023	"Holy Forever" (Note: Johnson is credited as a co-writer of "Holy Forever" performed by Chris Tomlin.) (Chris Tomlin)	Best Contemporary Christian Music Performance/Song	Nominated	
