= Steffany Gretzinger =

- Also known as: Steffany Frizzell-Gretzinger, Steffany Frizzell
- Born: Steffany Dawn Frizzell; November 8, 1984 (age 41); Oskaloosa, Iowa
- Origin: Wooster, Ohio
- Genres: Contemporary Christian, praise and worship, folk
- Occupations: Worship leader, singer, songwriter
- Instrument: Vocals
- Years active: 2011–present
- Labels: Bethel; Watershed; Provident; Sony
- Website: www.steffanygretzinger.com

Steffany Dawn Gretzinger (née Frizzell; born November 8, 1984) is an American music singer-songwriter and former ensemble vocalist with Bethel Music, based in Franklin, Tennessee. She released her first solo album, The Undoing, with Bethel Music in 2014. The album was a Billboard magazine breakthrough release, reaching number twenty on the Billboard 200, and also gained top five status among Top Christian and Independent albums in September 2014. Steffany is married to Stephen Gretzinger, and they have a daughter, Wonder Grace, and a son, Wilder Justice.

== Career ==
=== Featuring ===
Steffany Gretzinger worked mainly as a worship leader with Bethel Music, which is a part of Bethel Church in Redding, California. She was involved in three of Bethel Music's releases, which included: background vocals for Be Lifted High (2011, as Steffany Frizzell), "One Thirst" with fellow Bethel collective member Jeremy Riddle, and background vocals on fellow Bethel Music member William Matthews' release, Hope's Anthem (2011, as Steffany Frizzell).

Another release from such a gathering was The Loft Sessions (2012, again as Steffany Frizzell), where she was a featured vocalist and composer (and performed background vocals). The Loft Sessions was a live recording made "over several nights of worship sessions" in a rustic, refurbished loft, on which she sang "You Know Me" (solo) and "My Dear" (with Hunter Thompson). That same year, she was featured on the album For the Sake of the World, singing "Closer". She joined Bethel again for their release of Tides (2013), also released internationally (e.g., on the Onimusic label in Brazil), with her songs "Letting Go" and "Be Still".

=== Solo ===
Gretzinger's first solo album, The Undoing (2014), featured eleven original praise and worship pieces, accompanied by guitar and piano, and was released in August by Bethel Music. The album was a Billboard magazine breakthrough release and appeared on the Top Christian Albums chart at No. 2, the Independent Albums chart at No. 5, and the Billboard 200 chart at No. 20.

Since recording The Undoing, Gretzinger was featured on two further Bethel Music albums: You Make Me Brave (2014, "We Dance") and Have It All (2016, "Pieces"), the latter of which was also featured on Bethel member Amanda Cook's release, Brave New World (2015).

On March 9, 2018, Bethel Music announced the release of Gretzinger's second full-length studio project, Blackout, releasing the lead single, "Save Me". The album was released on March 29, 2018. She was featured on Francesca Battistelli's 2019 song "Defender", which Gretzinger co-wrote.

In 2020, Gretzinger released her third album, Forever Amen, with Provident Music Group.

== Life and career ==
Steffany Dawn (née Frizzell) Gretzinger has been engaged in worship ministry since childhood and grew up in a musical household. She moved to Redding, California, in 2008, to join the Bethel School of Supernatural Ministry. She was a worship leader at Bethel Church. She led her final worship service at Bethel Church on April 21, 2019, prior to relocating to Nashville, Tennessee.

Gretzinger is married to Stephen Gretzinger, and they have two children.

Gretzinger's mother, Kathy Frizzell, is involved in the Christian music industry in Nashville, Tennessee, as a writer. Gretzinger's late father, Ron Frizzell, was one of the associate pastors on staff at Wooster Nazarene.

== Discography ==
=== Albums ===
List of studio albums, with selected chart positions
Title	Album details	Peak chart positions						
Title	Album details	US	US Christ	US Indie	AUS	CAN	NZ Heat.	UK C&G
The Undoing	Released: August 25, 2014; Label: Bethel Music; Formats: CD, digital download, streaming	20	2	5	—	—	—	1
Blackout	Released: March 30, 2018; Label: Bethel Music; Formats: CD, digital download, streaming, LP	36	2	1	98	69	3	1
Forever Amen	Released: March 27, 2020; Label: Provident, Sony; Formats: CD, digital download, streaming	—	2	—	—	—	—	4
Faith of My Father	Released: November 5, 2021; Label: TIM Records; Formats: Digital download, streaming	—	30	—	—	—	—	10
The Narrow Way	Released: July 7, 2023; Label: Provident, Sony; Formats: Digital download, streaming	—	—	—	—	—	—	16
Psalms	Released: September 26, 2025; Label: Provident, Sony; Formats: Digital download, streaming	—	—	—	—	—	—	—
"—" denotes releases that did not chart or was not released in that territory.

=== Singles ===
==== As lead artist ====
Year	Single	Peak chart positions	Album
Year	Single	US Christ.	Album
2018	"Save Me"	28	Blackout
2021	"As the Deer"	—	Faith of My Father
"—" denotes releases that did not chart.

==== As featured artist ====
Year	Single	Peak chart positions		Album
Year	Single	US Christ.	US Gospel	Album
2015	"Never Changes" (Gracylyn featuring Steffany Gretzinger)	—	—	non-album single
2018	"Sails" (Pat Barrett featuring Steffany Gretzinger & Amanda Lindsey Cook)	—	—	Pat Barrett
2019	"Defender" (Francesca Battistelli featuring Steffany Gretzinger)	13	—	Own It
2019	"Good & Loved" (Travis Greene featuring Steffany Gretzinger)	—	7	Broken Record
2020	"Voice of God" (Dante Bowe featuring Steffany Gretzinger and Chandler Moore)	36	—	non-album single
2021	"Hosanna" (Worship Together and Ben Cantelon featuring Steffany Gretzinger)	—	—	non-album single

=== Other charted songs ===
Year	Song	Peak chart positions	Album
Year	Song	US Christ.	Album
2014	"Out of Hiding"	49	The Undoing
2016	"Pieces" (with Bethel Music)	38	Have It All
2017	"King of My Heart" (with Bethel Music and Jeremy Riddle)	29	Starlight
2017	"Extravagant" (with Bethel Music and Amanda Lindsey Cook)	30	Starlight
2018	"Blackout"	33	Blackout
2018	"Sing My Way Back"	34	Blackout
2018	"Reckless Love (Spontaneous)" (with Bethel Music)	38	Moments: Mighty Sound
2019	"Hallelujah Here Below" (Elevation Worship featuring Steffany Gretzinger)	24	Paradoxology
2020	"Forever Amen"	36	Forever Amen
2020	"No One Ever Cared For Me Like Jesus"	35	Forever Amen

=== Other appearances ===
Year	Song	Album
2011	"One Thirst" (with Bethel Music)	Be Lifted High
2012	"You Know Me" (with Bethel Music)	The Loft Sessions
2012	"Closer" (with Bethel Music)	For the Sake of the World
2013	"Be Still" (with Bethel Music)	Tides
2014	"Be Still (Live)" (with Bethel Music)	Tides Live
2014	"We Dance" (with Bethel Music)	You Make Me Brave: Live at the Civic
2016	"Sing Me Like a Song" (Nic & Rachael Billman featuring Steffany Gretzinger)	Kiss the Dawn
2016	"Always Good" (Nic & Rachael Billman featuring Steffany Gretzinger)	Kiss the Dawn
2016	"Like a Fire" (Sean Feucht featuring Steffany Gretzinger)	The Things We Did at First
2017	"Faithfulness" (Matt Maher featuring Steffany Gretzinger)	Echoes
2018	"On the Shores" (with Bethel Music and Jeremy Riddle)	Moments: Mighty Sound
2018	"Never Let Me Go" (William Matthews featuring Steffany Gretzinger)	Kosmos
2019	"Partes" (with Bethel Music)	Bethel Music en Español
2019	"Refiner" (Maverick City Music featuring Chandler Moore & Steffany Gretzinger)	Maverick City, Vol. 2
2019	"Communion" (Maverick City Music featuring Steffany Gretzinger & Brandon Lake)	Maverick City, Vol. 2
2019	"Hope Awakes" (David & Nicole Binion featuring Steffany Gretzinger)	Dwell: Christmas
2019	"God With Us / Immanuel (Spontaneous)" (David & Nicole Binion featuring Steffany Gretzinger)	Dwell: Christmas
2020	"Living Proof" (David & Nicole Binion featuring Steffany Gretzinger)	Glory of Eden
2020	"Thank You" (Maverick City Music featuring Steffany Gretzinger & Chandler Moore)	Maverick City Vol. 3 Part 1
2020	"Come Holy Spirit" (Martin Smith featuring Steffany Gretzinger)	Exalt (EP)

== Awards and nominations ==
=== GMA Dove Awards ===
Year	Nominee / work	Award	Result	Ref.
2018	Blackout	Short Form Video of the Year	Nominated	
2020	Forever Amen	Recorded Music Packaging of the Year	Nominated	
2021	"Good & Loved" (Travis Greene featuring Steffany Gretzinger)	Gospel Worship Recorded Song of the Year	Nominated	
2021	"Voice of God" (Dante Bowe featuring Steffany Gretzinger and Chandler Moore)	Gospel Worship Recorded Song of the Year	Nominated	

=== Grammy Awards ===
Year	Nominee / work	Award	Result	Ref.
2022	"Voice of God" (Dante Bowe featuring Steffany Gretzinger and Chandler Moore)	Best Gospel Performance/Song	Nominated	

== See also ==
- Bill Johnson (pastor)
