= You're Gonna Be OK =

Single by Jenn Johnson

from the album After All These Years
- Released: May 8, 2017
- Recorded: 2016
- Genre: Contemporary Christian music, pop, gospel
- Length: 3:37
- Label: Bethel Music
- Songwriter(s): Jenn Johnson; Seth Mosley; Jeremy Riddle
- Producer(s): Jason Ingram; Paul Mabury

Jenn Johnson singles chronology
"Chasing You" (2013)	"You're Gonna Be OK" (2017)	"Goodness of God" (2019)

Music video
- "You're Gonna Be OK" (Lyric Video) on YouTube

Audio sample
- "You're Gonna Be OK": file; help

"You're Gonna Be OK" is a song by Jenn Johnson, which was released on May 8, 2017, as Brian & Jenn Johnson's lead single from their first studio album, After All These Years (2017).

== Background ==
Composed by Jenn Johnson, Seth Mosley and Jeremy Riddle, the song was released as part of the Brian & Jenn Johnson compilation, After All These Years, on January 27, 2017.

On May 8, 2017, the radio version of the song was released as a digital download. The song also impacted Christian radio on May 26, 2017.

== Writing and development ==
Jenn Johnson had an interview with Kevin Davis, lead contributor at NewReleaseToday about the song and the inspiration behind it. Davis asked about the personal story behind the song, to which Johnson responded saying:

A year and half ago, Brian was really going through a tough time, and it unraveled and he ended up having a nervous breakdown. ... It was a really difficult time, and God really helped him to deal with things like forgiveness and some tough meetings with people at that time. It was a beautiful, although terrible, time. Lamentations [3:28-30] says, "the 'worst' is never the worst." That was the verse that I hung onto.

– Jenn Johnson, NewReleaseToday

Johnson also added that the song "felt like it was such a message and prophetic statement," and also "felt like God promised that if I wrote this song it would save people, and even people thinking of suicide can be filled with hope, even though we don't know what tomorrow holds." She also listed several scriptural references from various translations to affirm the song's message.

== Accolades ==
Awards
Year	Organization	Award	Result	Ref
2022	GMA Dove Awards	Inspirational Recorded Song of the Year	Nominated	

== Music videos ==
The official lyric video of the song was published on January 27, 2017, on Bethel Music's YouTube channel and has been viewed over 4 million times as of September 2017.

== Track listing ==
Digital download
No.	Title	Length
1.	"You're Gonna Be OK"	3:37

== Charts ==
Chart (2017)	Peak position
US Christian Songs (Billboard)	34
US Christian Digital Songs (Billboard)	17

== Release history ==
Region	Date	Format	Label	Ref.
Worldwide	May 8, 2017	Digital download	Bethel Music	
United States	May 26, 2017	Christian radio	Bethel Music	
