= This Is Jesus Culture =

Compilation album by Jesus Culture
- Released: April 7, 2015
- Recorded: 2010–2014
- Genre: Worship; contemporary Christian music
- Length: 78:42
- Label: Jesus Culture Music; Sparrow Records
- Producer: Jeremy Edwardson; Nathan Grubbs; Brian Johnson

Jesus Culture chronology
Unstoppable Love (2014)	This Is Jesus Culture (2015)	Let It Echo (2016)

Professional ratings
Review scores
Source	Rating
AllMusic	no rating
Cross Rhythms	10/10 squares
Hallels	no rating

This Is Jesus Culture is the first compilation album by American Christian worship band Jesus Culture. The album was released on April 7, 2015 by Jesus Culture Music alongside Sparrow Records. Jeremy Edwardson, Nathan Grubbs and Brian Johnson worked together on the production of the album.

The album is a compilation of popular songs by Jesus Culture recorded between 2010 and 2014, and also includes two new songs recorded live at the Jesus Culture Conference in Sacramento, California.

== Critical reception ==
AllMusic's Mark Deming wrote a positive review of the album, saying "This Is Jesus Culture is an impressive introduction to the group's music as well as an inspiring look at the passionate, powerful sounds that have made then one of the most popular and respected Christian music groups of their day."

== Track listing ==
Album release
No.	Title	Writer(s)	Length
1.	"I Want To Know You" (featuring Chris Quilala)	Jeffrey Kunde, Ian McIntosh, Chris Quilala	9:01
2.	"Sing Out" (featuring Chris Quilala)	Jeremy Edwardson, Kunde, McIntosh, Quilala	6:27
3.	"Unstoppable Love" (featuring Kim Walker-Smith)	Christa Black Gifford, Skyler Smith, Kim Walker-Smith	9:12
4.	"Rooftops" (featuring Kim Walker-Smith)	Jonathan Berlin, Lindsey Sweat, Ben Williams	7:49
5.	"Your Love Never Fails" (featuring Chris Quilala)	Chris McClarney, Anthony Skinner	7:59
6.	"Alleluia" (featuring Chris Quilala)	Kunde, McIntosh, Quilala, Jeremy Riddle	7:52
7.	"Agnus Dei" (featuring Chris Quilala)		4:54
8.	"How He Loves" (featuring Kim Walker-Smith)	John Mark McMillan	8:51
9.	"One Thing Remains" (featuring Chris Quilala)	Gifford, Brian Johnson, Riddle	8:37
10.	"Your Name Is Glorious" (featuring Kim Walker-Smith)	Jess Cates, Skinner	8:29
11.	"Show Me Your Glory" (featuring Kim Walker-Smith)	Kathy Frizell, Nate Ward II, Walker-Smith	8:20
12.	"Holy Spirit" (featuring Kim Walker-Smith)	Bryan Torwalt, Katie Torwalt	8:03
Total length:			78:42

== Personnel ==
Adapted from AllMusic.

- Kim Walker-Smith – vocals, backing vocals
- Jeremy Edwardson – programming
- Ian McIntosh – Fender Rhodes, keyboards, loops, programming
- Martin Smith – keyboards, acoustic guitar
- Justin Byrne – guitars
- Stuart Garrard – guitars
- Joel Kilmer – guitars
- Jeffrey Kunde – acoustic guitar, guitars
- Chris Quilala – electric guitars, rhythm guitar, guitars, drums, vocals, backing vocals
- Skyler Smith – acoustic guitar, electric guitars, percussion
- Brandon Aaronson – bass
- Josh Fisher – drums
- Derek Johnson – percussion
- Molly Williams – backing vocals

== Production ==
- Banning Liebscher – executive producer
- Kim Walker-Smith – executive producer
- Jeremy Edwardson – producer, engineer
- Nathan Grubbs – producer
- Brian Johnson – producer
- Adam French – engineer, editing
- Timothy Powell – engineer
- Jacob Wise – engineer
- Patrick Everett – assistant engineer
- Andrew Jackson – assistant engineer, engineer
- Brett Jimison – assistant engineer
- Sam Gibson – mixing
- Jeremy Griffith – mixing
- Ainslie Grosser – mixing
- Greg Calbi – mastering
- Troy Glessner – mastering
- Drew Lavyne – mastering
- Joshua Wurzelbacher – design
- Skylauki Productions – art direction

== Charts ==
Chart (2016)	Peak position
US Christian Albums (Billboard)	15

== Release history ==
Region	Date	Version	Format	Label	Ref.
Worldwide	April 7, 2015	Standard	CD; digital download; streaming	Jesus Culture Music; Sparrow Records	
