= After All These Years (Brian & Jenn Johnson album) =

Studio album by Brian & Jenn Johnson
- Released: January 27, 2017
- Recorded: 2016
- Studios: Bethel Music Studios, Redding, California; Blackbird Studios, Nashville, Tennessee
- Genres: Worship; contemporary Christian
- Length: 47:14
- Label: Bethel Music
- Producers: Jason Ingram; Paul Mabury

Brian & Jenn Johnson chronology
Where You Go I Go (2008)	After All These Years (2017)

Singles from After All These Years
- 1. "You're Gonna Be OK" Released: May 8, 2017

After All These Years is the first studio album from Brian & Jenn Johnson, and their fourth album overall. The album was released on January 27, 2017, by Bethel Music. The duo worked with Jason Ingram and Paul Mabury in the production of the album.

== Background ==
Brian and Jenn Johnson, after a hiatus of more than ten years as a duo, announced on January 13, 2017, that their album would be released on January 27, 2017. The Johnsons, having been worship pastors and songwriters at Bethel Church for over fifteen years, in addition to composing and recording songs for Bethel Music, also released Undone in 2001 and We Believe in 2006. The musical style of the album is different from previous Bethel Music releases in that an 80-piece symphony orchestra is featured on all tracks of the album.

Brian Johnson had an interview with Sharefaith Magazine about the album and his worship ministry. He shared his personal story about overcoming a nervous breakdown through devotion to studying scripture and worship, telling that a demo of the song "Greater Than All Other Names" by Jason Ingram helped him, saying: "I listened to that song on repeat every day for six months straight, it really ministered to me." In the duo's interview with Doug Doppler of Worship Musician magazine, he went on to say about "Greater Than All Other Names" that for the rest of his life "there probably won’t be a song in my iTunes music library that will have as many plays as that one." In the same interview, Jenn Johnson was asked about the story behind "Mention of Your Name", to which she responded that she "said the name of Jesus as they were rushing me into an emergency C-section because it was the only thing I had to say" and that it offered her peace.

== Promotion ==
Three songs were made available for download during pre-order on January 6, 2017, with the album being released on January 27, 2017. The songs which were released are "Mention of Your Name", "Only Jesus" and "Gravity".

== Singles ==
"You're Gonna Be OK", the song led by Jenn Johnson was released on May 8, 2017, as the lead single from the album. "You're Gonna Be OK" impacted Christian radio on May 26, 2017.

== Critical reception ==
Professional ratings
Review scores
Source	Rating
CCM Magazine	4/5 stars
The Christian Beat	4.5/5 stars
Cross Rhythms	9/10 squares
Hallels	5/5 stars
Jesus Freak Hideout	4/5 stars
NewReleaseToday	4.5/5 stars
Today's Christian Entertainment	3.3/5 stars

Designating the album four stars at CCM Magazine, Matt Conner states, "After spending the bulk of their book time raising up exciting new worship leaders and inspirational voices, the time has come for another release from the duo. After All These Years is the resulting release, filled with dynamic vertical songs that connect the heart of the listener with the heart of God. ... The album is another way in which the Johnsons continue to nurture the church." Madeleine Dittmer, affixing a four and a half star rating upon the album for The Christian Beat, concludes that the album, "is both musically and lyrically a beautiful collection of worship songs. The Johnson's love and adoration for Good shines through with prayerful lyrics, and the instrumentation and melodies join with these inspired words to crazy some that are beautiful offerings of worship." Bestowing a nine square rating for Cross Rhythms, Tony Cummings concludes simply: "Another gem from the Bethel Music movement." Timothy Yap of Hallels rated the album five stars, saying that "if you love slow and pensive ballads sung with utmost verve, After All These Years is it." In his track-by-track four star review of the album at Jesus Freak Hideout, Matthew Baldwin concluded that "The Johnsons do not disappoint in their latest offering as the years of leading and writing worship music lend a polish and depth that only years and experience can bring. The neoclassical arrangements give the music an artsy enough experience to impress the hipster culture as well as the casual music connoisseur. It is a worshipful experience that is well worth the journey and has me excited about the worship music scene." The album garnered a four and a half star rating from a NewReleaseToday review by Kevin Davis stating that it, "is best described as a worship experience with an ethereal tone," and concluded that "After All These Years is about proclaiming the majesty of God and crying out in awe and wonder for His Presence, and it's a must-have for your praise and worship collection." Kelly Meade, indicating in a three-point-three star review at Today's Christian Entertainment, states the recording, "is the kind of worship album that keeps the current trend of melodic vocals and soaring instrumental backgrounds going while during the hearts and thoughts of listeners towards God and His mercy, love and grace."

== Commercial performance ==
After All These Years made its debut on Billboard Christian Albums chart at No. 1 with 16,000 equivalent album units sold as of February 8, 2017. The album also registered at No. 21 on the Billboard 200 and No. 32 on the Canadian Albums chart. The album also made the duo's debut on the Australian ARIA Albums Chart at No. 7.

== Track listing ==
After All These Years
No.	Title	Writer(s)	Lead singer	Length
1.	"Mention of Your Name"	Jenn Johnson, Matt Redman, Jonas Myrin, Brian Johnson	Jenn Johnson	5:26
2.	"Only Jesus"	Hank Bentley, Jason Ingram, B. Johnson, Joel Taylor	Brian Johnson	4:53
3.	"Gravity"	J. Johnson, Seth Mosley	Jenn Johnson	5:16
4.	"I Won't Forget"	B. Johnson, Ingram, Jeremy Riddle, J. Johnson	Brian Johnson	5:06
5.	"Mercy and Majesty"	B. Johnson, Riddle, Redman, Ingram, Myrin, Ben Glover	Brian Johnson	4:25
6.	"Here I Bow"	Ingram, Redman, Myrin, B. Johnson, J. Johnson	Jenn Johnson	4:15
7.	"Greater Than All Other Names"	B. Johnson, Ingram, Riddle	Brian Johnson	5:37
8.	"After All These Years"	B. Johnson, Matt Maher, Ingram	Brian Johnson	4:36
9.	"You're Gonna Be OK"	J. Johnson, Mosley, Riddle	Jenn Johnson	3:39
10.	"For the One"	J. Johnson, Paul McClure	Jenn Johnson	4:01
Total length:				47:14

== Personnel ==
Adapted from AllMusic.

- Robby Busick – production manager
- Chris Estes – director
- Kiley Goodpasture – creative director
- Stephen James Hart – art direction, design
- Jason Ingram – background vocals, producer, programming
- Brian Johnson – acoustic guitar, background vocals, executive producer, vocals
- Jenn Johnson – background vocals, executive producer, vocals
- Dwayne Larring – electric guitar
- Brett Mabury – string arrangements
- Paul Mabury – background vocals, drums, producer, programming
- Stephen Marcussen – mastering
- Sean Moffit – mixing, mixing engineer
- Justin Posey – photography
- Joel Taylor – executive producer
- Joe Williams – programming

== Charts ==
=== Weekly charts ===
Chart (2017)	Peak position
Australian Albums (ARIA)	7
Belgian Albums (Ultratop Flanders)	166
Canadian Albums (Billboard)	32
Dutch Albums (Album Top 100)	76
New Zealand Albums (RMNZ)	29
Norwegian Albums (VG-lista)	25
Scottish Albums (Official Charts)	74
UK Christian & Gospel Albums (OCC)	1
US Billboard 200	21
US Top Christian Albums (Billboard)	1
US Independent Albums (Billboard)	2

=== Year-end charts ===
Chart (2017)	Position
US Christian Albums (Billboard)	63

== Release history ==
Region	Date	Version	Format	Label	Ref.
Worldwide	January 27, 2017	Standard	CD; Digital download; streaming	Bethel Music	
