= Hope's Anthem =

Studio album by William Matthews
- Released: July 26, 2011
- Genre: CCM, worship
- Length: 42:00
- Label: Bethel, Kingsway
- Producer: Jeff Schneeweis

William Matthews chronology
Hope's Anthem (2011)	Kosmos (2018)

Hope's Anthem is the debut studio album by William Matthews. Bethel Music alongside Kingsway Music released the album on July 26, 2011.

== Critical reception ==
Professional ratings
Review scores
Source	Rating
Cross Rhythms	8/10 squares
New Release Tuesday	3.5/5 stars

Rating the album an eight out of ten from Cross Rhythms, Tony Cummings writes about the purpose of the album as "A worthy aim indeed." Kelly Sheads, awarding the album three and a half stars at New Release Tuesday, states, "While this album doesn’t necessarily bring anything new to the table lyrically", yet "The sound on this album is more unique and soulful than your average worship CD".

== Track listing ==
No.	Title	Writer(s)	Length
1.	"Deep Cries Out"	Christiann Koepke, William Matthews	5:01
2.	"This One Thing"	Christa Black Gifford, William Matthews	3:41
3.	"We Believe"	Black Gifford, Matthews	3:43
4.	"Hope's Anthem"	Black Gifford, Matthews	5:27
5.	"So Good To Me"	Cory Asbury, Matthews	4:14
6.	"The Lord Is My Shepard"	John-Paul Gentile, Matthews	4:49
7.	"I'm Free"	Gentile, Matthews	2:38
8.	"Bridge Over Troubled Waters"	Luke Hendrickson, Lydia Hendrickson, Matthews	3:42
9.	"My Great Reward"	Black Gifford, Matthews, Jeremy Riddle	3:55
10.	"I Just Want You More"	Black Gifford, Charles Jones, Matthews, Will Regan	4:43
Total length:			42:00

== Charts ==
Chart (2011)	Peak position
US Christian Albums (Billboard)	27
US Heatseekers Albums (Billboard)	19
