= The Loft Sessions =

Live album by Bethel Music
- Released: January 24, 2012
- Recorded: 2011
- Genre: Worship; contemporary Christian music
- Length: 42:24
- Label: Kingsway Music
- Producer: Brian Johnson; Daniel James Mackenzie; Rick McDonald

Bethel Music chronology
Be Lifted High (2011)	The Loft Sessions (2012)	For the Sake of the World (2012)

Singles from The Loft Sessions
- 1. "Come to Me" Released: December 13, 2011

The Loft Sessions is the third album from California-based worship collective Bethel Music. The album was released on January 24, 2012 by Kingsway Music. Brian Johnson, Daniel James Mackenzie and Rick McDonald produced the album.

Prior to the release of the album, Kingsway Music released "Come to Me" which featured the vocals of Jenn Johnson on December 13, 2011 as the lead single of the album.

== Background ==
The album was recorded live over the course of several nights in a refurbished loft in the historic Sherven Square building. The Bethel Music collective gathered with friends and family for the duration of the recordings.

== Singles ==
Kingsway Music released "Come to Me" which featured the vocals of Jenn Johnson in 2011 as the lead single of the album. The song reached number one on the U.S. iTunes Christian Chart.

== Critical reception ==
Professional ratings
Review scores
Source	Rating
AllMusic	3/5 stars
Cross Rhythms	7/10 squares
Indie Vision Music	2/5 stars
Jesus Freak Hideout	4/5 stars
Louder Than The Music	5/5 stars
NewReleaseToday	4/5 stars

Jessica Morris of Jesus Freak Hideout rated the album four stars out of a possible five, citing "the musicality and restraint Bethel displays in stripping back the smoke and mirrors is what makes The Loft Sessions a phenomenal release." and concluded that "each track of this striking album draws the listener deeper into the presence of God and leaves them wanting more of Bethel music, and of Jesus." AllMusic's Jon O'Brien, affixing a three star rating of the album, believes that Bethel's album was showcasing "a new, organic sound which veers more toward the contemporary nu-folk scene than their usual soft rock fare." The album managed to attain a four star rating average from New Release Today reviewers Kevin Davis and Kelly Sheads. New Release Today's Kevin Davis rated the album four-and-a-half stars, stating that "Every song on this album has quickly become a staple in my playlist of my favorite worship anthems. Every song is worshipful and catchy." Kelly Sheads rated the album three-and-a-half stars, saying "With an eclectic sound and a variety of musical styles, no song is the same, keeping the listener focused on the message within." Elliot Rose of Cross Rhythms rated the album seven out of ten squares, noting the lack of "passion and atmosphere of previous releases". In a review for Louder Than The Music, Jono Davies bestowed the album four-and-a-half stars, recommending "If you're looking for a bunch of songs to use in a time of reflectiveness with God, with a few upbeat happy and non cheesy acoustic songs thrown in, then look no further than The Loft Sessions."

== Track listing ==
Standard edition
No.	Title	Writer(s)	Worship leader(s)	Length
1.	"One Thing Remains"	Christa Black; Brian Johnson; Jeremy Riddle	Brian Johnson	4:01
2.	"My Dear"	Hunter G.K. Thompson	Hunter G.K. Thompson	3:52
3.	"You Have Won Me"	B. Johnson; Joel Taylor	Brian Johnson	4:27
4.	"Come to Me"	John Hendrickson; Jenn Johnson	Jenn Johnson	4:19
5.	"Walk in the Promise"	Jeremy Riddle	Jeremy Riddle	4:25
6.	"You Know Me"	Steffany Frizell Gretzinger; William Matthews	Steffany Gretzinger	5:39
7.	"Angels"	B. Johnson; Taylor	Brian Johnson	4:02
8.	"Fall Afresh"	Riddle	Jeremy Riddle	4:24
9.	"Draw Near"	Matt Stinton	Jeremy Riddle	3:32
10.	"This Is What You Do"	Riddle; Stinton	Matt Stinton	3:51
Total length:				42:24

iTunes bonus content
No.	Title	Worship leader(s)	Length
11.	"Angels" (Acoustic)	Brian Johnson	3:50
12.	"Fall Afresh" (Acoustic)	Jeremy Riddle	4:20
13.	"Come to Me" (Video)	Jenn Johnson	4:28
14.	"You Know Me" (Video)	Steffany Gretzinger	5:38
15.	"One Thing Remains" (Video)	Brian Johnson	4:00
Total length:			64:40

== Personnel ==
Adapter from AllMusic.

Vocalists

- Steffany Frizzell – lead vocals, backing vocals
- Kalley Heiligenthal – backing vocals
- Brian Johnson – lead vocals, backing vocals
- Jenn Johnson – lead vocals
- Leah Johnson – backing vocals
- Graham Moore – backing vocals
- Jeremy Riddle – lead vocals
- Jeff Schnweeweis – backing vocals
- Hunter G.K. Thompson – lead vocals, backing vocals
- Matt Stinton – lead vocals

Musicians

- Luke Hendrickson – keyboards
- Matt Lopez – accordion
- Daniel James Mackenzie – keyboards, accordion, acoustic guitar, electric guitars, banjo, bass
- John-Paul Gentile – acoustic guitar
- Brian Johnson – acoustic guitar
- Brandon Aaronson – bass
- John Hendrickson – drums
- Graham Moore – percussion
- Timothy Jon – cello
- Martin Rosenhoff – cello
- Rebekah Van Tinteren – violin

== Production ==
- Joel Taylor – executive producer
- Brian Johnson – producer
- Daniel James Mackenzie – co-producer, engineer
- Luke Hendrickson – engineer
- Andrew Jackson – engineer
- Jeff Schnweeweis – engineer, production assistant
- Jordan Jackiew – mixing
- MasterMix (Nashville, Tennessee) – mastering location
- Jason Bourneman – soundscaping
- Drew Small – production assistant
- Walter Serafini – project coordinator
- Shannon Clark – set design coordinator
- Gabriel Wilson – set design
- Jason Miller – photography
- Breezy Baldwin — album design
- Christiann Koepke – make-up design
- Alexandria Rickett — make-up design

DVD credits

- Rick McDonald – producer
- Aaron Rich – director, editing, camera operator
- Miguel Cruz – camera operator
- Cory Fournier – camera operator, gaffer
- Chris Jones – camera operator
- Mike Myers – best boy
- Ryan Braun – post-production assistant

== Charts ==
=== Album ===
Chart (2012)	Peak position
US Billboard 200	44
US Christian Albums (Billboard)	3
US Digital Albums (Billboard)	18

=== Singles ===
Year	Single	Peak positions
Year	Single	Christian Digital Songs
2011	"Come to Me"	14
