= Be Lifted High =

Live album by Bethel Music
- Released: February 17, 2011
- Recorded: 2010
- Venue: Bethel Church, Redding, California, U.S.
- Genre: Worship; contemporary Christian music
- Length: 78:28
- Label: Bethel Music; Kingsway Music
- Producer: Jeremy Edwardson

Bethel Music chronology
Here Is Love (2010)	Be Lifted High (2011)	The Loft Sessions (2012)

Be Lifted High is the second live album by California-based worship collective Bethel Music. The album was released on February 17, 2011 by Kingsway Music alongside the group's imprint label, Bethel Music. Jeremy Edwardson worked on the production of the album. The album was recorded live at Bethel Church in Redding, California and includes a DVD containing interviews about worship with Bethel Church pastors Bill Johnson and Kris Vallotton as well as Bethel Music artists such as Brian and Jenn Johnson, Jeremy Riddle and others.

== Critical reception ==
Professional ratings
Review scores
Source	Rating
AllMusic	3.5/5 stars
Cross Rhythms	9/10 squares
Jesus Freak Hideout	4/5 stars
Louder Than The Music	4.5/5 stars
NewReleaseToday	4.5/5 stars

James Christopher Monger of AllMusic rated the album three and a half stars out of five, saying that the songs are "bolstered by an enthusiastic crowd and the top-notch production values that listeners have come to expect from the series." Cross Rhythms music critic Stephen Luff rated the album nine square out of ten, concluding that the album "an excellent resource for churches and individuals alike and raises the bar for future live worship recordings." Jason Rooks of Jesus Freak Hideout before the album a four star rating, noting that "Be Lifted High brings some much needed fresh air to the praise and worship genre into one of the best releases this year in the genre." Louder Than The Music's Jono Davies gave the album a near-perfect rating at four and a half stars, saying, "These are amazing worship songs that make you want to close your eyes, lift your hands up in the air and sing out with heartfelt passion for God. I love this album because it has drawn me closer to God with a strong mix of melodic worship songs that have really captured me to be able to worship God." Kevin Davis was superbly positive to the album and rated it four and a half stars, saying in his review "Every song is worshipful and catchy. For sure, this will be among my top worship albums of the year. My best description of this incredible album is to remember the first time you attended a worship event that really made the hair stand up on your neck and if you want to re-live that experience, then you need to get Be Lifted High."

== Track listing ==
Be Lifted High – Disc 1
No.	Title	Writer(s)	Worship leader(s)	Length
1.	"You Are Good"	Brian Johnson; Jeremy Riddle	Brian Johnson	4:25
2.	"One Thing Remains"	B. Johnson; Christa Black; Riddle	Brian Johnson	5:00
3.	"Furious"	Riddle	Jeremy Riddle	5:16
4.	"Be Lifted High"	B. Johnson; Black; Tim Hughes	Brian Johnson	6:54
5.	"God I Look to You"	Jenn Johnson; Ian McIntosh	Jenn Johnson	7:32
6.	"I Will Exalt"	Amanda Falk	Amanda Falk	6:44
7.	"What Would I Have Done"	B. Johnson; Black; Hughes	Brian Johnson; Jenn Johnson	6:13
8.	"Hope's Anthem"	Black; William Matthews	William Matthews	5:45
9.	"Love Came Down"	B. Johnson; J. Johnson; Riddle; McIntosh; Jeremy Edwardson	Brian Johnson	5:06
10.	"Deep Cries Out"	Christiann Koepke; Matthews	William Matthews	5:14
11.	"God of the Redeemed"	Hannah McClure; Riddle; Paul McClure	Jeremy Riddle	6:08
12.	"Forever and a Day"	Anthony Skinner	Jenn Johnson	7:05
13.	"One Thirst"	Riddle	Jeremy Riddle; Steffany Frizzell	7:05
Total length:				78:28

DVD – Disc 2
No.	Title	Length
1.	"Be Lifted High Worship Interviews (DVD)"

== Personnel ==
Adapted from AllMusic.

Singers

- Melissa Casey – backing vocals
- Jeremy Edwardson – additional vocals
- Amanda Falk – lead vocals
- Sean Frizzell – additional vocals
- Steffany Frizzell – backing vocals
- Brian Johnson – lead vocals
- Jenn Johnson – lead vocals
- Leah Märi – additional vocals
- William Matthews – lead vocals
- Jeremy Riddle – lead vocals

Musicians

- Ian McIntosh – keyboards
- Brian Johnson – acoustic guitars
- Jeremy Riddle – acoustic guitars
- Jonathan Berlin – electric guitars
- Jeffrey Kunde – electric guitars
- Brandon Aaronson – bass
- Luke Hogg – drums
- Chris Quilala – drums
- Sarah Fiene – cello
- Anton Patzner – violin

== Production ==
- Brian Johnson – executive producer
- Jeremy Edwardson – producer, engineer
- Adam Doria – assistant engineer
- Jeff Hubbard – assistant engineer
- Andrew Jackson – assistant engineer
- Michael Williams – assistant engineer
- Jacob Wise – assistant engineer
- Paul Vallacoffman – stage sound
- Breezy Baldwin – design
- Jason Borneman – photography

== Charts ==
Chart (2011)	Peak position
US Top Christian Albums (Billboard)	7

== Release history ==
Region	Date	Version	Format	Label	Ref.
Worldwide	February 15, 2011	Standard	CD	Bethel Music; Kingsway Music	
Worldwide	March 22, 2011	Standard	Digital download	Bethel Music	
