= Tides Live =

Live album by Bethel Music
- Released: February 25, 2014
- Recorded: 2013
- Genre: Worship; contemporary Christian music
- Length: 63:07
- Label: Bethel Music

Bethel Music live album chronology
For the Sake of the World (2012)	Tides Live (2014)	You Make Me Brave (2014)

Bethel Music chronology
Discover Bethel Music (2013)	Tides Live (2014)	You Make Me Brave (2014)

Tides Live is the fifth live album, the ninth album overall and the last instalment of the Tides series by California-based worship collective Bethel Music. The album was released on February 25, 2014 by the group's imprint label, Bethel Music.

== Background ==
Following the successful release of Tides in September 2013, Bethel Music began leading the songs from that album during the weekend services at Bethel Church in Redding and at regional gatherings and recording them. Joel Taylor, director of Bethel Music, in a statement on Hear It First, said:

The new live album offers a fresh and powerful perspective on these songs, and draws listeners into a worship experience full of spontaneous moments and sounds of praise.

– Joel Taylor, Hear It First

== Critical reception ==
Professional ratings
Review scores
Source	Rating
AllMusic	3/5 stars
Louder Than The Music	4.5/5 stars

At AllMusic, David Jeffries rated the album three stars out of five, concluding that "fans of the original Tides will appreciate this set, which certainly sounds bigger, although not necessarily better." Rating the album four and a half stars by Louder Than The Music, Jono Davies thinks that "This album is not better or worse than its studio brother, this album is different and equally as strong," and concludes that "All of this together creates a brilliant time of live worship captured wonderfully in this album."

== Track listing ==
Tides Live
No.	Title	Writer(s)	Worship leader(s)	Length
1.	"For the Cross"	Jenn Johnson, Brian Johnson, Gabriel Wilson, Ian McIntosh	Jenn Johnson; Brian Johnson	5:47
2.	"Heaven's Song"	Jeremy Riddle	Jeremy Riddle	8:39
3.	"Strong in Us"	B. Johnson, Kristian Stanfill, Joel Taylor, Wilson, McIntosh	Brian Johnson	4:52
4.	"Give Me Jesus"	Matt Stinton	Matt Stinton	6:11
5.	"Forever"	B. Johnson, Kari Jobe, J. Johnson, Wilson, Taylor, Christa Black	Brian Johnson	9:07
6.	"Come Awaken Love"	Hunter Thompson	Hunter G K Thompson	4:26
7.	"Chasing You"	J. Johnson, Wilson, McIntosh, Riddle, Daniel Mackenzie	Jenn Johnson	7:23
8.	"Breaking Through"	Riddle	Jeremy Riddle	7:24
9.	"Be Still"	Steffany Frizzell Gretzinger, Wilson	Steffany Frizzell Gretzinger	6:38
10.	"Ascend"	William Matthews, Gretzinger, Bobby Strand, Mackenzie	William Matthews	5:08
11.	"I Can Feel You"	J. Johnson, Gretzinger, Mackenzie, Thompson, Wilson	Jenn Johnson	7:32
Total length:				63:07

== Charts ==
Chart (2014)	Peak position
UK Christian and Gospel Albums (OCC)	1
US Billboard 200	28
US Christian Albums (Billboard)	1
US Digital Albums (Billboard)	12
US Independent Albums (Billboard)	2

== Release history ==
Region	Date	Version	Format	Label	Ref.
Worldwide	February 25, 2014	Standard	CD; digital download; streaming	Bethel Music	
