= Without Words (album) =

Remix album by Bethel Music
- Released: March 5, 2013
- Genre: Worship; contemporary Christian music
- Length: 51:06
- Label: Bethel Music; Integrity Music
- Producer: Garret Viggers; Gabriel Wilson

Bethel Music Remix chronology
Without Words (2013)	Without Words: Synesthesia (2015)

Bethel Music chronology
For the Sake of the World (2012)	Without Words (2013)	Tides (2013)

Without Words is the first remix album by California-based worship collective Bethel Music, and it is also the fifth album overall to be released. The album was released on March 5, 2013 by the group's imprint label, Bethel Music alongside Integrity Music. Garrett Viggers and Gabriel Wilson produced the album together.

The album is an entirely remixed instrumental collection of select songs previously released by Bethel Music in an effort to explore "what it is to worship— without words."

== Critical reception ==
Professional ratings
Review scores
Source	Rating
AllMusic	3/5 stars
Cross Rhythms	7/10 squares
Indie Vision Music	3/5 stars
Louder Than The Music	4/5 stars
NewReleaseToday	4.5/5 stars
Today's Christian Music	3/5 stars

David Jeffries, rating the album three stars at AllMusic, says "While it's fine background music for anyone, those most familiar with Bethel's output are going to get the most out of this soothing release." Stephen Luff, reviewing the album for Cross Rhythms whilst rating it seven squares out of ten, says, "I have to mention, however, that it took a number of plays of the disc for me to really "tune in" to what the album is all about as it is not like other "instrumental praise" albums and to the casual listener, it can sound a little like a film soundtrack. ... However, the project will reap rewards with frequent listening." At Indie Vision Music, Jonathan Andre gave the album a three star rating, concluding on a congratulatory note, "Well done Bethel for such an enjoyable and certainly timeless album that will forever change how worship instrumental music is made!" Jono Davies, indicating in a three star review at Louder Than The Music, says, "Creatively Bethel have made a stunning piece of music, just for me I would rather listen to a bunch of new songs with new expressive lyrics to help with my worship to God." Rating the album four and a half stars by NewReleaseToday, Marcus Hathcock confesses "When I first saw the concept of Without Words, I honestly expected an elevator music album of Bethel songs. I had no idea the depth of the artistry that would go into an album that doesn't have a single lyric." Awarding the album three stars from Today's Christian Music, Grace S. Aspinwall writes, "The whole album has great worshipful lyrics that dig deep into the soul."

== Track listing ==
Without Words — Standard edition
No.	Title	Writer(s)	Length
1.	"What Does It Sound Like"	Brian Johnson	3:31
2.	"God I Look to You"	Jenn Johnson; Ian McIntosh	5:47
3.	"Forgiven"	B. Johnson; Graham Moore; Jeremy Riddle; Joel Taylor	5:19
4.	"For the Sake of the World"	B. Johnson; Riddle; Taylor	6:39
5.	"Angels"	B. Johnson; Taylor	5:11
6.	"Come to Me"	John Hendrickson; Jenn Johnson	4:29
7.	"To Our God"	B. Johnson; Riddle; Taylor	5:30
8.	"One Thirst"	Riddle	4:51
9.	"Worthy Is the Lamb"	B. Johnson	4:28
10.	"I Will Exalt"	Amanda Cook	5:20
Total length:			51:06

iTunes bonus content
No.	Title	Length
11.	"God I Look to You" (Video)	3:56
Total length:		55:02

== Personnel ==
Adapted from AllMusic.

- Jerry Aaronson – ham radio
- James Gabriel – string arrangements
- John-Paul Gentile – acoustic guitar
- Chris Greely – keyboards, mastering, mixing
- Nathan Grubbs – design, photography
- Daley Hake – photography
- Kiley Hill – project manager
- Hannah Jeanpierre – strings
- Brian Johnson – executive producer
- Jenn Johnson – vocals
- Timothy Jon – strings
- Jeremy Larson – string arrangements, strings
- Daniel Mackenzie – banjo, bass, editing, vocoder
- Amy Renee Miller – vocals
- Jason Miller – back cover photo
- Graham Moore – percussion, vocals
- Daniel Schafer – horn, trumpet
- Joel Taylor – executive producer
- Rebekah Van Tinteren – strings
- Garrett Viggers – banjo, Fender Rhodes, Hammer Dulcimer, harmonium, melodica, producer, pump organ, string arrangements, vocals
- Kendra Wieck – strings
- Gabriel Wilson – acoustic guitar, delay, drums, Fender Rhodes, grand piano, guitar, harmonium, keyboards, loops, Moog synthesizer, percussion, producer, programming, reed organ, string arrangements, typewriter, upright piano, vocoder

== Charts ==
Chart (2013)	Peak position
UK Christian & Gospel Albums (OCC)	2
US Billboard 200	106
US Top Christian Albums (Billboard)	10

== Release history ==
Region	Date	Version	Format	Label	Ref.
Worldwide	March 5, 2013	Standard	CD; digital download; streaming	Bethel Music	
