= Split the Sky =

Studio album by Chris Quilala
- Released: November 11, 2016
- Genres: Worship; contemporary Christian music
- Length: 56:52
- Labels: Jesus Culture Music; Sparrow
- Producers: Jeremy Edwardson; Daniel James Mackenzie

Singles from Split the Sky
- 1. "Because of Your Love" Released: October 6, 2016; 2. "Won My Heart" Released: October 21, 2016; 3. "After My Heart" Released: November 4, 2016

Split the Sky is the first solo studio album by Chris Quilala. The album was released on November 11, 2016, by Sparrow Records alongside Jesus Culture Music. Jeremy Edwardson and Daniel James Mackenzie worked together in the production of the album.

== Background ==
In a press release by Jesus Culture Music on October 10, 2016, it was announced that the album would be released on November 11, 2016. In the press release, the album was described as being "set apart" from Jesus Culture's preceding releases, and with reference to the musical style, it said that Quilala was "largely influenced by retro pop, futuristic soundscapes and driven by big synth melodies."

Quilala, after fifteen years of leading people into praise in service and on thirteen live worship projects as a Jesus Culture worship leader, drew inspiration for the album after the death of his son in late 2014. In a statement on CBN.com, Quilala says:

"My wife and I lost our son, and so we went through a journey of encountering God's goodness and His hope even in the midst of pain, ... So a lot of songs came from that. It just felt like the right time to make a solo album and put language and music behind what I've experienced, and just God's goodness and faithfulness through what I've felt and I'm sure will be the darkest season I've ever walked through."

== Singles ==
The music video of "Because of Your Love" was released on October 6, 2016, as the first single of the album. "Because of Your Love" was then made available for download on November 4, 2016. "Won My Heart" and "After My Heart" were also released as singles prior to the album's release on October 21 and November 4, 2016, respectively.

== Commercial performance ==
As of November 23, 2016, 3,000 units of Split the Sky were sold. The album made its debut at No. 8 on the Billboard Christian Albums chart dated December 3, 2016.

== Critical reception ==
Professional ratings
Review scores
| Source | Rating |
|---|---|
| CCM Magazine | 4/5 stars |
| The Christian Beat | 3.9/5 stars |
| Cross Rhythms | 9/10 squares |
| Louder Than The Music | 5/5 stars |
| Today's Christian Entertainment | 3.2/5 stars |
| Worship Leader | 4.5/5 stars |

Matt Conner of CCM Magazine rated the album four stars out of a possible five, describing the album as being "steeped in the synth pop of his [Quilala's] generation, with bleeps, blips and synthetic swirls that surround familiar vertical refrains." and urged worship fans to "note the sonic curve Quilala throws on this one, since it's not as straightforward as a Jesus Culture release," then concludes that "it's well past time for a nuanced, layered release like this. Kudos to Quilala for delivering it." The Christian Beat's Emily Caroline, affixing a three-point-nine star rating of the album, believes that Quilala's album is "a completely new experience to in contemporary Christian music." and that it's "synthesized framework and style have the ability to reach and appeal to a whole new group of listeners, while the lyrics share messages of praise and thanksgiving for the incredible things possible with God." Chris Webb gave the album a near-perfect rating of nine out of ten squares in his review at Cross Rhythms, describing the album as "Swirling waves of synth-based soundscapes crash like breakers on the sea shore surrounding the vocalist almost as a picture of how Chris feels surrounded by the Holy Spirit," and concluded that "High production values, strong melodies and positive and thought-provoking lyrics all make for a top notch album." The album managed to attain a perfect five star rating from a Louder Than the Music review by Carolyn Aldis stating that "listening to it gives you the sense of connecting with God on a whole new level… its worship to sing along to, to listen to on headphones and reflect and it also works as background songs that usher in the presence of God anywhere." In a review for Today's Christian Entertainment, Kelly Meade bestowed upon the album three-point-two stars, reached the following conclusion: "While each track on Split the Sky is well produced with smooth vocals set to a melodic background, it does feel a bit repetitive. However, the overall theme of God's love for us and His faithfulness is clearly in the forefront." Worship Leader's Amanda Furbeck gave the album a four and a half star rating, describing as follows: "Split the Sky is the sound of ancient-future faith, pushing the limits of modern worship style while pulling in retro sounds from eras past."

== Track listing ==
Track list
| No. | Title | Writer(s) | Length |
|---|---|---|---|
| 1. | "Welcome Here" | Chris Quilala; Mark Alan Schoolmeesters; Joshua Silverberg; Ryan Williams | 4:20 |
| 2. | "After My Heart" | Mia Fieldes; Reuben Morgan; Quilala; Jacob Sooter | 4:09 |
| 3. | "Because of Your Love" | Ran Jackson; Ricky Jackson; Quilala | 5:15 |
| 4. | "Won My Heart" | Quilala; Sarah Reeves; Sooter | 3:43 |
| 5. | "Only One God" | Michael Farren; Bryan Fowler | 4:06 |
| 6. | "Encounter" | Stuart Garrard; Quilala; Silverberg; Dustin Smith | 5:35 |
| 7. | "Surrendered" (featuring Kari Jobe) | Brooke Ligertwood; Scott Ligertwood; Quilala | 4:08 |
| 8. | "The Length of the Cross" | Ran Jackson; Quilala | 4:24 |
| 9. | "Reign" | Fieldes; Quilala; Sooter | 3:55 |
| 10. | "Heart's Cry" | Jeffrey Kunde; Quilala; Schoolmeesters; Silverberg; Williams | 6:29 |
| 11. | "All to You" | Quilala; Matt Redman; Jeremy Riddle; Silverberg | 4:17 |
| 12. | "Heaven Came for Me" | Hank Bentley; Fowler; Quilala | 6:31 |
| Total length: | | | 56:52 |

== Personnel ==
Adapted from AllMusic.

- Chris Quilala – vocals
- Jeremy Edwardson – keyboards, programming, backing vocals
- Jonathan Berlin – keyboards, programming, electric guitars
- Andrew Jackson – keyboards, programming
- Daniel James Mackenzie – keyboards, programming, acoustic guitars, electric guitars, bass
- Ian McIntosh – keyboards, programming
- Jeffrey Kunde – acoustic guitars, electric guitars
- Michael Pope – electric guitars
- Jacob Arnold – drums, percussion
- Jeremy Larson – strings
- Cody Carnes – backing vocals
- Ran Jackson – backing vocals
- Kari Jobe – backing vocals
- Val Mancini – backing vocals
- Daniella Mason – backing vocals
- Joshua Silverberg – backing vocals

Production

- Banning Liebscher – executive producer
- Kim Walker-Smith – executive producer
- Christopher York – A&R
- Jeremy Edwardson – producer, engineer
- Daniel James Mackenzie – producer, engineer, mixing
- Andrew Jackson – engineer
- Leon Zervos – mastering
- Joey Seales – design, packaging
- Trever Hoehne – photography

== Chart performance ==
| Chart (2016) | Peak position |
|---|---|
| US Top Christian Albums (Billboard) | 8 |
