= Have It All (Bethel Music and Brian Johnson song) =

- Official studio version cover

Single by Bethel Music and Brian Johnson

from the album Have It All
- Released: February 20, 2016 (live release); May 6, 2016 (studio release)
- Recorded: 2015
- Genre: Worship; contemporary Christian music
- Length: 6:30 (live version); 4:09 (studio version)
- Label: Bethel
- Songwriters: Brian Johnson; Bobby Strand; Lindsey Strand; Mia Fieldes; Joel Taylor
- Producers: Chris Greely; B. Strand

Bethel Music singles chronology
"No Longer Slaves" (2015)	"Have It All" (00000001)	"Take Courage" (2017)

Brian Johnson singles chronology
"Love Came Down" (2010)	"Have It All" (2016)	"God of Revival" (2020)

Have It All (Live)
- Official live version cover

Music video
- "Have It All" on YouTube

"Have It All" is a song by Bethel Music and Brian Johnson and is Bethel Music's lead and only single from their eighth live album, Have It All (2016). The song also appeared on the album Bethel Music en Español (2019). The live version of "Have It All" was released for streaming on February 20, 2016, followed by the release of the studio version on May 6, 2016. The song was written by Brian Johnson, Bobby Strand, Lindsey Strand, Mia Fieldes, and Joel Taylor, with production being handled by Chris Greely and Bobby Strand.

== Background ==
A live version of the song, recorded at Bethel Church in Redding, California, was released as the first single from Bethel Music's live LP, Have It All, on February 20, 2016 via the streaming service Spotify prior to the album's release. The album was released on March 11, 2016.

On May 6, 2016, the studio version of the song was released as a single in digital download and streaming formats. The song's studio version impacted Christian radio on May 13, 2016.

== Writing and development ==
In an interview with Kevin Davis of NewReleaseToday, Brian Johnson said:

"It's interesting to be on the other end of a song being finished. The song didn't start out as me trying to write a song. One of our pastors was doing an altar call at the church on a Sunday morning, and I remember we were kneeling down. This lyric and melody 'You can have it all, Lord, every part of my world' came to me, the whole chorus melody and words came to me. It was a cool moment, as I realized that this was a song. It was birthed during an altar call in a moment of surrender to God. I think the song is special because of that for me. Specifically the season that I was in and the season I've been in afterwards is interesting relative to this song. The lyric 'take this life and breathe on this heart that is now Yours' is about submitting all of ourselves to God. When God breathes on us and puts His stamp on us, there's power and life and complete transformation. For us, in going out into the world and being an example for Him, wherever the Kingdom message is preached, there is complete transformation. Wherever the Kingdom message is preached, there's complete transformation. It's not just a thought or empty theology. There's actual power behind it. I feel like this song has an evangelistic call. To be honest, I wrote the song last summer, and then I had a nervous breakdown. I ended up in the hospital. It was brokenness and a complete feeling of really needing God. I told my kids in moments like that, when you are at your end, there's no One but God. These lyrics started to make sense to me on another level. More than anything, the reason we titled the album Have It All is not because this is the best song by any means, but the idea of 'You can have it all' and inspiring people to give all to God, and come to the place where they are completely undone and surrendered to Him—I would pray that this song would inspire that. This could maybe be an altar call song that people can sing and say 'what is Your will, God?'"

== Critical reception ==
Mark Ryan of NewReleaseToday said "'Have It All' is new song of surrender. The sound of the congregation singing along with Brian Johnson draws you into the evening it was recorded. The subdued guitar and muted kick drum in the opening leave the listener with an ethereal sense of being. This is a song to be sung from your knees with hands raised in surrender." Cross Rhythms's Tony Cummings labeled it a "white flag anthem". Kevin Davis, also of New Release Today, stated "This song totally moves me in my personal worship time. The song is an ethereal vertical worship ballad in the style of We Will Not Be Shaken, sung with a stirring passion and filled with prayerful declarations. This is an incredible song for the Church. The theme of this song should be the heartbeat of every faithful Christian. You'll be raising your heart and hands in worship along with this great new song. I hear in Brian's vocals a sincere yearning for God and thankfulness in his heart for God's mercy and grace. I'm completely convicted by the strong lyrics and find immense comfort in this song."

== Music video ==
The official music video of "Have It All" with Brian Johnson leading it in worship at Bethel Church was published on YouTube by Bethel Music on February 17, 2016, has been viewed over 790 thousand times as of August 2017.

The official lyric video of the song was published on March 11, 2016, on Bethel Music's YouTube channel and has garnered over 3 million views as of August 2017.

== Release history ==
Region	Date	Version	Format	Label	Ref.
Worldwide	February 20, 2016	Live	Streaming	Bethel Music	
Worldwide	May 6, 2016	Studio	Digital download; streaming	Bethel Music	
United States	May 13, 2016	Studio	Christian radio	Bethel Music	
