= For the Sake of the World =

Live album by Bethel Music
- Released: October 1, 2012
- Recorded: 2012
- Venue: Bethel Church, Redding, California, U.S.
- Genre: Worship; contemporary Christian music
- Length: 78:02
- Label: Bethel Music
- Producer: Brian Johnson; Ian McIntosh; Jeffrey Kunde

Bethel Music live album chronology
The Loft Sessions (2012)	For the Sake of the World (2012)	Tides Live (2014)

Bethel Music chronology
The Loft Sessions (2012)	For the Sake of the World (2012)	Without Words (2013)

For the Sake of the World is the fourth album from American worship collective Bethel Music. The album, produced by Brian Johnson, Ian McIntosh and Jeffrey Kunde, was released on 1 October 2012 by the collective's imprint label, Bethel Music. The album was recorded live during the weekend services at Bethel Church in Redding, California.

== Critical reception ==
Professional ratings
Review scores
Source	Rating
Cross Rhythms	9/10 squares
Indie Vision Music	3/5 stars
Louder Than The Music	5/5 stars
NewReleaseToday	4/5 stars

Kevin Davis, in his four star review for New Release Today, described the album as being "a sonically and lyrically refreshing work where God is exalted and His love is on display." and that the album was "created with excellence in mind and combines anointed worship and quality to create a truly epic album." Awarding the album five stars in a review for Louder Than The Music, Jono Davies thinks that the album "lets the worshipper be washed anew with the love of God by the reflective music that at times keeps a low key but then at other times builds into a wall of praise." and listed "To Our God", "For the Sake of the World" and "This Is Amazing Grace" as the standout tracks of the album. Cross Rhythms' Dave Palmer, affixing a nine-out-of-ten square rating on the album, stated that the album "feels like a very honest journey through the life of a church rather than a collection of classic tracks or the next big hits, but it will certainly touch many worshippers." Writing for Revival Magazine, Naomi Parnell says: "The worship is sincere and the lyrics are honouring, which leads me into God's presence with expectancy and reminds me of His goodness and sovereignty." In a review for BREATHEcast, Timothy Yap listed "Who You Are", "For the Sake of the World" and "Forgiven" as the prime cuts of the album and stated that Bethel Music "have made worship music three dimensional where God is not just sung about but He is experienced." Yap also commented that "these songs make you want to sing-a-long regardless of whether you are a Christian or not." and that the album also has "a more polished, slick and a grander production" compared to Bethel Music's preceding release, The Loft Sessions. Reviewing the album for The Esther Project, Alexis Wisniewski refers to the collection as "13 songs that are genuine and passionate, you can't help but engage." and concluded that "If you're a believer who likes to have good worship music at home, check this out. If you're a worship leader who is always looking for great music for your congregation, check this out." An unnamed reviewer on CBN.com said: "For the Sake of the World pulls you into a congregational worship service that is intimately moving." For the Sake of the World garnered a three star rating Jonathan Andre's review at Indie Vision Music, congratulating Bethel "for such a motivating and inspiring album". Furthermore, the CBN.com reviewer said that the songs "guide you to a place of surrender before a holy God." and went on to list "To Our God", "Closer" and "For the Sake of the World" as the highlights of the album. Steve Legget of AllMusic called the album a "power praise & worship session," and that it is "another welcome addition to the Bethel Live series."

== Track listing ==
For the Sake of the World – Standard edition
No.	Title	Writer(s)	Worship leader(s)	Length
1.	"To Our God"	Brian Johnson, Jeremy Riddle, Joel Taylor	Brian Johnson	6:54
2.	"Our Father"	Marcus Meier	Jenn Johnson	6:48
3.	"Everything To You" (Spontaneous)	Jenn Johnson	Jenn Johnson	4:51
4.	"This Is Amazing Grace"	Josh Farro, Riddle, Phil Wickham	Jeremy Riddle	7:32
5.	"You Have Won Me"	B. Johnson, Riddle, Taylor	Brian Johnson	6:16
6.	"I Really Love You" (Spontaneous)	B. Johnson, J. Johnson	Brian Johnson; Jenn Johnson	4:08
7.	"Who You Are"	Haley Johnson, J. Johnson	Jenn Johnson	8:17
8.	"Forgiven"	B. Johnson, Graham Moore, Riddle, Taylor	Brian Johnson	5:13
9.	"In Your Light"	Moore, Riddle	Jeremy Riddle	4:16
10.	"Freedom"	Christa Black Gifford, William Matthews, Matthew Sparks	William Matthews	3:55
11.	"Closer"	Amanda Cook	Steffany Gretzinger	6:53
12.	"This Is What You Do"	Riddle, Matt Stinton	William Matthews	5:35
13.	"For the Sake of the World"	B. Johnson, Riddle, Taylor	Brian Johnson	7:24
Total length:				78:02

iTunes bonus tracks
No.	Title	Worship leader(s)	Length
14.	"Closer" (Video)	Steffany Gretzinger	7:05
15.	"To Our God" (Video)	Brian Johnson	7:07
16.	"Who You Are" (Video)	Jenn Johnson	8:18
Total length:			100:32

== Personnel ==
Adapter from AllMusic

Singers

- Steffany Gretzinger – vocals, backing vocals
- Brian Johnson – vocals
- Jenn Johnson – vocals
- William Matthews – vocals, backing vocals
- Jeremy Riddle – vocals
- Leah Valenzuela – backing vocals

Musicians

- Ian McIntosh – keyboards
- Brian Johnson – acoustic guitars
- Jeffrey Kunde – acoustic guitars, electric guitars
- Mike Pope – electric guitars
- Daniel Mackenzie – lap steel guitar, bass
- Brandon Aaronson – bass
- Chris Quilala – drums
- John-Paul Gentile – percussion
- Graham Moore – percussion
- Asher Stanley – cello
- Sylvia Bartel – violin
- Rebekah Van Tinteren – violin
- Allison Wyatt – violin

== Production ==
CD Credits

- Joel Taylor – executive producer
- Brian Johnson – producer
- Jeffrey Kunde – producer
- Ian McIntosh – producer
- Luke Hendrickson – engineer, mixing
- Sam Gibson – mixing
- Hank Williams – mastering at MasterMix (Nashville, Tennessee)
- Walter Serafini – project coordinator
- Giles Lambert – art direction, design, photography
- Christiann Koepke – hair stylist, make-up
- Hannah Whittaker – hair stylist, make-up

DVD Credits

- Rick McDonald – director, producer
- Aaron Rich – cinematography, editing
- Jeff Aaronson – camera operator, video producer
- Stephen Casey – camera operator, video producer
- Josh Colegrove – camera operator, video producer
- Libby Friz – camera operator, video producer
- Ryan Harris – camera operator, video producer
- Toby Johnston – camera operator, video producer
- Shea McCloughin – camera operator, video producer
- Sarah Meng – camera operator, video producer
- Harry Omensetter – camera operator, video producer
- Sarah Oliveira – camera operator, video producer
- Breanna Patterson – camera operator, video producer
- Jenni Patterson – camera operator, video producer
- Peter Ralph – camera operator, video operator
- Anthony West – camera operator, video producer
- Miguel Cruz – camera operator
- Nathan Grubbs – camera operator
- Mike Myers — camera operator
- Chris Jones – technical director
- Tim Garrison – audio technician
- Chris Greely – audio technician
- Brian How – audio technician
- Paul Vafacoffman – audio technician
- James Nichols – monitor technician
- Brett Whitefield – monitor technician
- Cory Fournier – lighting
- Gabriel Wilson – set design

== Charts ==
Chart (2012)	Peak position
US Billboard 200	51
US Christian Albums (Billboard)	2

Chart (2013)	Peak position
UK Christian & Gospel Albums (OCC)	6
