= We Believe (album) =

Live album by Brian & Jenn Johnson
- Released: September 26, 2006
- Recorded: 2005
- Venue: Bethel Church, Redding, California, U.S.
- Genre: Worship; contemporary Christian music
- Length: 67:09
- Label: Bethel Music; Found; EMI; Kingsway Music
- Producer: Jeremy Edwardson; Brian Johnson; Steven Tracy

Brian & Jenn Johnson chronology
Undone (2001)	We Believe (2006)	Where You Go I Go (2008)

We Believe is the second live album by American Christian worship duo Brian & Jenn Johnson. The album was released on September 26, 2006, by Bethel Music, alongside Found Records, EMI and Kingsway Music. Jeremy Edwardson, Brian Johnson and Steven Tracy worked together on the production of the album. The album was recorded live at Bethel Church in Redding, California.

== Critical reception ==
Professional ratings
Review scores
Source	Rating
Cross Rhythms	9/10 squares

Aaron Ferris of Cross Rhythms rated the album nine squares out of a possible ten, saying: "The varied writing will attract those whose preference may lie outside the boundaries of the present day worship genre but satisfactorily meeting the tastes of the uncompromising worship appreciator." Worshipmusic.com's Jeremy Dunn had positive impressions of the album, saying "Those of you that like your live worship authentic and fresh will love this CD." In a review for Gateway News, Michael Keef concludes as follows: "Brian and Jenn both express a deep love and passion for the Lord and this, expressed through their unique sound, helps one to enjoy God-focussed worship, where one can either sing along or simply listen and allow the words to wash you."

== Track listing ==
We Believe
No.	Title	Writer(s)	Length
1.	"Greatly to Be Praised"	Brian Johnson; Jenn Johnson	5:33
2.	"Isn't He Great"	B. Johnson; Anthony Skinner	5:14
3.	"O Taste and See"	B. Johnson; J. Johnson	4:23
4.	"We Believe"	B. Johnson	5:50
5.	"Where You Go I Go"	B. Johnson; John Mohr	10:04
6.	"I Will Bless Your Name"	B. Johnson	4:40
7.	"I Was Created to Worship"	B. Johnson	4:36
8.	"Come Everyone"	B. Johnson	7:22
9.	"All My Worship"	B. Johnson	5:01
10.	"More of You Less of Me"	B. Johnson	3:41
11.	"You Have Ravished My Heart"	B. Johnson	3:46
12.	"A Little Longer"	J. Johnson	4:10
13.	"O Taste and See" (Studio)	B. Johnson; J. Johnson	3:28
Total length:			67:09

== Personnel ==
Adapted from AllMusic, and Barnes and Noble.

- Joseph Choi – electric guitar
- Marc Cooper – electric guitar
- Jeremy Edwardson – engineer, producer, programming
- Adam French – Pro-Tools
- Ainslie Grosser – mixing, Pro-Tools
- Brian Johnson – engineer, executive producer, acoustic guitar, electric guitar, primary artist, producer, Pro-Tools, vocals
- Jenn Johnson – piano, primary artist, background vocals, vocals
- Michael Joyce – bass, engineer, Pro-Tools, programming
- Joel Kilmer – electric guitar
- Ian McIntosh – Fender Rhodes, keyboards, piano
- Marc Pusch – executive producer
- Chris Quilala – drums
- Steven Tracy – electric guitar, engineer, Fender Rhodes, producer, programming
- Kim Walker – background vocals
- Michael Wilson – photography

== Charts ==
Chart (2006)	Peak position
US Top Christian Albums (Billboard)	48

== Release history ==
Region	Date	Version	Format	Label	Ref.
Worldwide	September 26, 2006	Standard	Digital download	Bethel Music	
Worldwide	November 9, 2010	Standard	CD	Found Records; EMI; Kingsway Music	
