= Have It All (Bethel Music album) =

Live album by Bethel Music
- Released: March 11, 2016
- Recorded: 2015
- Venue: Bethel Church, Redding, California
- Genre: Worship; contemporary Christian music
- Length: 1:36:30
- Label: Bethel Music
- Producer: Chris Greely; Bobby Strand

Bethel Music live album chronology
We Will Not Be Shaken (Live) (2015)	Have It All (2016)	Starlight (2017)

Bethel Music chronology
Without Words: Synesthesia (2015)	Have It All (2016)	Starlight (2017)

Singles from Have It All
- 1. "Have It All" Released: February 20, 2016

Have It All is the eighth live album and twelfth album overall by California based Bethel Music. It was released through the group's imprint label, Bethel Music, on March 11, 2016. It was produced by Chris Greely and Bobby Strand, and mastered by Ted Jensen at Sterling Sound, NYC.

== Critical reception ==
Professional ratings
Review scores
Source	Rating
CCM Magazine	4/5 stars
The Christian Beat	4.5/5 stars
Jesus Wired	83/100
Louder Than the Music	4/5 stars
New Release Today	3.5/5 stars
Worship Leader	4.5/5 stars

Matt Conner, indicating in a four star review at CCM Magazine, states, "This collection does what Bethel Music always does: connects the created to the Creator in inspirational ways on each release." Awarding the album four and a half stars from Worship Leader, Jeremy Armstrong writes, "In this collection of prayers, Have It All demonstrates a spectrum of the beauty of God...Have It All maintains the organic feel that has become Bethel's trademark and indeed their most important asset. The worship feels sincere, and the spontaneous moments add to the overall worship experience as listeners are invited to take part and join the cloud of witnesses." Mark Ryan, giving the album three and a half stars at New Release Today, states, "This album is full of truth and reflection. It is not a high energy praise-fest, but rather an album designed around the concepts of vulnerability, honesty and resilience." Rating the album four and a half stars by The Christian Beat, Madeleine Dittmer describes, "Have it All pours out praises to our Heavenly Father in songs that truly give Him all. The authentic quality in the lyrics and instrumental dynamics flow through each of the sixteen songs on the album, creating a powerful collection appropriate for all stages of life." Laura Chambers, reviewing the album for Today's Christian Entertainment, says, "Have It All is a well-rounded blend of the simple and profound, the quiet whispers and the triumphant shouts." Indicating with an 83 out of 100 rating for Jesus Wired, Rebekah Joy states, "this is a very honest album that will give listeners the chance to really reflect, and use these songs to connect with God and praise him." Philip Aldis, signaling in a four star review at Louder Than the Music, writes, "it's well made, sumptuously recorded, and all good and genuine perhaps hard to hear it’s a live album at times, only the applause at the end being the clear evidence."

== Awards and accolades ==
In August 2016, the Gospel Music Association announced the nominees of the 47th Annual GMA Dove Awards with Have It All being nominated for a Dove Award in the Worship Album of the Year and Recorded Music Packaging of the Year categories.

== Singles ==
On May 6, 2016, a live version of "Have It All" featuring the vocals of Brian Johnson was released as the lead single from the album on Spotify. The studio version of "Have It All" was released on May 6, 2016 as a digital download and on streaming platforms, before impacting Christian radio on May 13, 2016.

== Track listing ==
Standard edition
No.	Title	Writer(s)	Worship leader(s)	Length
1.	"Shine on Us"	William Matthews; Ran Jackson; John–Paul Gentile	William Matthews	4:32
2.	"Faithful to the End"	Hannah McClure; Paul McClure; Brian Johnson; Joel Taylor	Paul McClure; Hannah McClure	6:36
3.	"Have It All"	B. Johnson; Bobby Strand; Lindsey Strand; Mia Fieldes; Joel Taylor	Brian Johnson; Lindsey Strand	6:30
4.	"Colors" (Spontaneous)	L. Strand; Brian Johnson	Brian Johnson; Lindsey Strand	4:33
5.	"Be Enthroned"	Hunter Thompson; Kalley Heiligenthal; Jeremy Riddle; B. Johnson	Jeremy Riddle	8:05
6.	"Pieces"	Amanda Cook; Steffany Gretzinger	Steffany Gretzinger	5:39
7.	"Lion and the Lamb"	Leeland Mooring; Brenton Brown; B. Johnson	Leeland Mooring	4:40
8.	"Thank You"	Melissa Helser; Jonathan David Helser; B. Johnson	Jonathan Helser	5:54
9.	"Praises (Be Lifted Up)"	Josh Baldwin	Josh Baldwin	7:33
10.	"Heaven Come"	Jenn Johnson; Brooke Ligertwood; Scott Ligertwood	Jenn Johnson	8:23
11.	"Sweet Praise" (Spontaneous)	Brian Johnson; Jenn Johnson	Brian Johnson; Jenn Johnson	6:16
12.	"Son of God"	Cory Asbury; Caleb Culver; Jon Egan; B. Johnson; Jason Ingram	Cory Asbury	4:50
13.	"Greatness of Your Glory"	B. Johnson; Brenton Brown; Matt Maher; Chris Tomlin	Brian Johnson	6:38
14.	"Mercy"	Cook; Gretzinger	Amanda Cook	5:52
15.	"Spirit Move"	Heiligenthal; Cook; B. Johnson	Kalley Heiligenthal	5:05
16.	"Glory to Glory"	Matthews; Rick Seibold; Lauren Evans	William Matthews	5:24
Total length:				1:36:30

== Credits ==
Adapted from AllMusic.

- Eric Allen — production director
- Cory Asbury — acoustic guitar, background vocals, lead
- Clint Aull — stage production
- Josh Baldwin — acoustic guitar, lead
- Robby Busick — production coordination
- Amanda Cook — background vocals, lead
- Chris Estes — publishing
- Steffany Gretzinger — background vocals, lead
- Kiley Goodpasture — creative director
- Chris Greely — mixing engineer, producer
- Stephen James Hart — design, photography, visual worship leader
- Kalley Heiligenthal — lead
- Jonathan David Helser — acoustic guitar, lead
- Luke Hendrickson — keyboard
- Ted Jensen — mastering
- Brian Johnson — acoustic guitar, executive producer, lead
- Jenn Johnson — background vocals, lead
- Drake Kelch — lighting
- Andrew Kiser — bass
- William Matthews — background vocals, lead
- Hannah McClure — lead
- Paul McClure — acoustic guitar, lead
- Liam Monroe — lighting
- Casey Moore — electric guitar
- Leeland Mooring — acoustic guitar, background vocals, lead
- Matthew Ogden — bass
- Sarah Oliveira — videography
- Michael Pope — director, electric guitar
- Justin Posey — photography
- Jeremy Riddle — acoustic guitar, lead
- Bobby Strand — electric guitar, producer
- Lindsey Strand — background vocals, lead, project manager
- Joel Taylor — executive producer
- Jonah Thompson — monito engineer
- Rebekah Van Tinteren — strings
- Joe Volk — background vocals, drums, percussion
- Ally Whitworth — production coordinator
- David Whitworth — drums, percussion
- Allison Wyatt — strings

== Charts ==
=== Weekly charts ===
Chart (2016)	Peak position
Australian Albums (ARIA)	8
Belgian Albums (Ultratop Flanders)	187
Canadian Albums (Billboard)	11
Dutch Albums (Album Top 100)	50
New Zealand Albums (RMNZ)	11
Norwegian Albums (VG-lista)	16
Scottish Albums (OCC)	37
UK Albums (OCC)	40
UK Christian & Gospel Albums (OCC)	1
US Billboard 200	12
US Digital Albums (Billboard)	1
US Christian Albums (Billboard)	2

=== Year-end charts ===
Chart (2016)	Position
US Christian Albums (Billboard)	12

Chart (2017)	Position
US Christian Albums (Billboard)	36

== Certifications and sales ==
Region	Certification	Certified units/sales
South Africa (RISA)	Gold	15,000^{*}
^{*} Sales figures based on certification alone.

== Release history ==
Region	Date	Version	Format	Label	Ref.
Worldwide	March 11, 2016	Standard	CD; digital download	Bethel Music	
