= Here Is Love =

Live album by Bethel Music
- Released: October 12, 2010
- Recorded: 2010
- Venue: Bethel Church, Redding, California, U.S.
- Genre: Worship; contemporary Christian music
- Length: 69:53
- Label: Bethel Music; Integrity Music
- Producer: Jeremy Edwardson

Bethel Music chronology
| Here Is Love (2010) | Be Lifted High (2011) |

Here Is Love is the first live album by California-based worship collective Bethel Music. The album was released on October 12, 2010, by Bethel Music alongside Integrity Music. Jeremy Edwardson worked on the production of the album.

The album was recorded live at Bethel Church, Redding, California, and it also featured Jesus Culture artists Chris Quilala, Kim Walker-Smith and Kristene DiMarco.

== Critical reception ==
Professional ratings
Review scores
| Source | Rating |
|---|---|
| Cross Rhythms | 10/10 squares |

Paul Kerslake of Cross Rhythms, rated the album a perfect ten squares stating that the album was "great" for "This is a stunning worship album, well chosen worship songs that are new but familiar, arrangements that are worshipful and inspiring, honest and revealing times of worship that I feel privileged to be able to share." He concluded that it was "quite possibly the worship album of the year."

== Track listing ==
Album release
| No. | Title | Writer(s) | Worship leader(s) | Length |
|---|---|---|---|---|
| 1. | "My Soul Sings" | Stuart Garrard, Martin Smith, Jonathan Thatcher | Brian Johnson | 4:29 |
| 2. | "I've Found a Love (Love Came Down)" | Ben Cantelon | Jenn Johnson | 6:13 |
| 3. | "King of Wonders" | Paul Baloche, Steven Curtis Chapman, Garrard, Israel Houghton, Tim Hughes, Graham Kendrick, Andy Park, Matt Redman, Martin Smith, Michael W. Smith, Chris Tomlin, Darlene Zschech | Chris Quilala | 4:29 |
| 4. | "I Love Your Presence" | Darren Clarke, Jesse Lane | Jenn Johnson | 7:45 |
| 5. | "You Make Me Happy" (Spontanteous) | Jenn Johnson | Jenn Johnson | 4:41 |
| 6. | "What Does It Sound Like" | B. Johnson | Brian Johnson | 8:43 |
| 7. | "Healer" | Mike Gulglielmucci | Leah Valenzuela | 5:33 |
| 8. | "I Need You More" | Lyndell Cooley, Bruce Haynes | Kim Walker-Smith | 9:01 |
| 9. | "Let Heaven Shout" | Jesse Rodgers | Kristene Mueller | 4:46 |
| 10. | "Worthy Is the Lamb" | B. Johnson | Brian Johnson | 5:23 |
| 11. | "Here Is Love" | Ken Bible, Robert Lowry | Brian Johnson; Jenn Johnson | 8:50 |
| Total length: | | | | 69:53 |

== Personnel ==
Adapted from AllMusic.

- Brandon Aaronson – bass
- Sylvia Bartel – violin
- Melissa Brodeur – background vocals
- Kyle Couillard – guitar, acoustic guitar
- Kristene DiMarco – vocals, background vocals
- Miguel Cruz – inside photo
- Jeremy Edwardson – engineer, producer
- Adam French – engineer
- Troy Glessner – mastering
- Ainslie Grosser – mixing
- Myriah Grubbs – cover photo
- Nathan Grubbs – design, graphics
- Lucas Hogg – drums
- Brian Johnson – executive producer, vocals, background vocals, acoustic guitar, electric guitar
- Jenn Johnson – vocals, background vocals
- Daniel Kalte – live sound
- Luke Manwaring – video director, video editor, video producer
- Leah Märi – vocals, background vocals
- Ian McIntosh – keyboards
- Dave Myrvold – stage sound
- Chris Quilala – vocals, backgrounds vocals, drums, guitar, electric guitar
- Martin Rosenhoff – cello
- Kim Walker-Smith – vocals

== Release history ==
| Region | Date | Version | Format | Label | Ref. |
|---|---|---|---|---|---|
| Worldwide | October 12, 2010 | Standard | Digital download | Bethel Music | |
| Worldwide | October 25, 2010 | Standard | CD | Bethel Music; Integrity Music | |
