= Where You Go I Go =

Live album by Brian & Jenn Johnson
- Released: September 30, 2008
- Recorded: 2008
- Venue: Bethel Church, Redding, California, U.S.
- Genre: Worship; contemporary Christian music
- Length: 66:09
- Label: ION Records
- Producer: Jeremy Edwardson; Brian Johnson

Brian & Jenn Johnson chronology
We Believe (2006)	Where You Go I Go (2008)	After All These Years (2017)

Where You Go I Go is the third live album by American Christian worship duo Brian & Jenn Johnson. The album was released on September 30, 2008 by ION Records. Jeremy Edwardson and Brian Johnson worked together on the production of the album. The album was recorded live at Bethel Church in Redding, California.

== Critical reception ==
Professional ratings
Review scores
Source	Rating
Cross Rhythms	8/10 squares
NewReleaseToday	4.5/5 stars

In a review for Cross Rhythms, Adrian Cherrill bestowed the album eight squares out of ten, saying "Lyrically strong and excellently played, the whole album exudes a powerful worship atmosphere." Justin K of NewReleaseToday rated the album four and a half stars out of a possible five stating that the album was "great" for "worship leaders or any body who loves new, fresh worship music."

== Track listing ==
Where You Go I Go
No.	Title	Writer(s)	Length
1.	"Greatly to Be Praised"	Brian Johnson; Jenn Johnson	5:33
2.	"O Taste and See"	B. Johnson; J. Johnson	4:23
3.	"We Believe"	B. Johnson	5:50
4.	"Isn't He Great"	B. Johnson; Anthony Skinner	5:14
5.	"Where You Go I Go"	B. Johnson; John Mohr	10:14
6.	"I Will Bless Your Name"	B. Johnson	4:40
7.	"I Was Created to Worship"	B. Johnson	4:36
8.	"Come Everyone"	B. Johnson	7:22
9.	"All My Worship"	B. Johnson	5:01
10.	"More of You Less of Me"	B. Johnson	3:41
11.	"You Have Ravished My Heart"	B. Johnson	3:46
12.	"A Little Longer"	J. Johnson	5:59
Total length:			66:09

== Personnel ==
Adapted from AllMusic.

- Marc Cooper – electric guitar
- Jeremy Edwardson – engineer, producer, programming
- Brian Johnson – digital editing, engineer, executive producer, acoustic guitar, electric guitar, primary artist, producer, vocals
- Jenn Johnson – piano, primary artist, background vocals, vocals
- Michael Joyce – bass, digital editing, engineer, programming
- Ian McIntosh – Fender Rhodes, keyboards, piano
- Marc Pusch – executive producer
- Chris Quilala – drums
- Kim Walker-Smith – background vocals

== Release history ==
Region	Date	Version	Format	Label	Ref.
