= Brian Johnson (Bethel Music singer) =

American worship musician

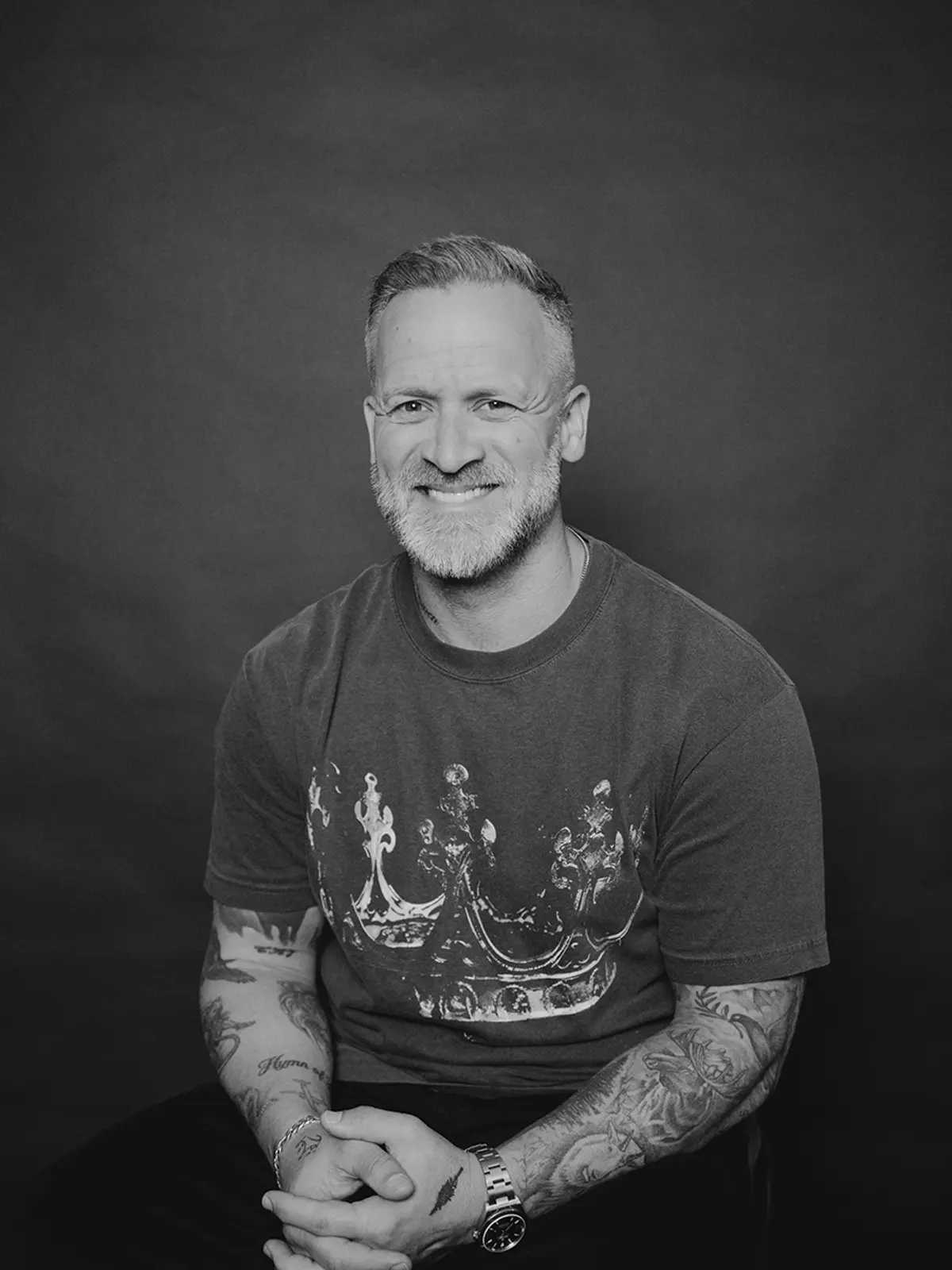
- Occupations: Pastor; record executive
- Spouse: Jenn Johnson
- Children: 5
- Father: Bill Johnson
- Musical career
- Genres: Contemporary worship music; CCM
- Occupations: Singer; songwriter; record producer; musician; worship pastor
- Instruments: Vocals; guitar
- Years active: 2001–present
- Labels: Bethel Music; Kingsway Music
- Website: brianjohnsonmusic.com

Brian Johnson is an American contemporary worship musician and worship pastor. He is the president and co-founder of Bethel Music, as well as a member of its Artist Collective and is one-half of the husband-and-wife worship duo, Brian & Jenn Johnson. He is also a senior worship pastor at Bethel Church in Redding, California, and a Senior Overseer of WorshipU, an online school of worship under Bethel Music, which he co-founded with Jenn Johnson.

As a solo musician, Johnson has released one album, Love Came Down - Live Acoustic Worship in the Studio (2010). As a part of Brian & Jenn Johnson, three live albums have been released: Undone (2001), We Believe (2006)- the duo's first release to chart on Billboard's Christian Albums chart, and Where You Go I Go (2008). The duo has also released one studio album, After All These Years (2017), which charted on the US Billboard 200. As a founding member of Bethel Music, Johnson has been featured on most Bethel Music releases. As a songwriter, Johnson has co-written CCLI Top 100 Chart ranking songs such as "Love Came Down," "No Longer Slaves", "Forever", and "One Thing Remains". Johnson has also worked as a producer on multiple Bethel Music, Jesus Culture, and Brian & Jenn Johnson releases, alongside various producers such as Jeremy Edwardson and Ian McIntosh.

== Early life ==
In 1978, Johnson's father Bill moved his family to Weaverville, California, after Bethel Church, under the leadership of his grandfather, Earl Johnson, sent his father to pastor Mountain Chapel. In 1996, After seventeen years, the Johnsons moved back to Redding in 1996 when Bill and Beni Johnson assumed leadership of Bethel Church.

== Ministry and music career ==
=== 2000s ===
In 2000, Johnson and his wife, Jenn Johnson, were appointed as senior worship pastors at Bethel Church. As Brian & Jenn Johnson, they released their debut album, Undone, in 2001, featuring Johnson's younger sister Leah Valenzuela. After a five-year hiatus, Brian & Jenn Johnson released their second live album, We Believe in 2006, which was co-produced by Johnson alongside Jeremy Edwardson and Steven Tracy. We Believe also charted at No. 48 on the Billboard Christian Albums chart, making the album the first by the duo to register on the chart. On September 30, 2008, Where You Go I Go, the duo's third album, was released via the label Ion Records.

=== 2010s ===
In 2010, Bethel Music released Here Is Love, its debut album on October 12, via its own label, Bethel Music alongside Integrity Music. Johnson featured on four tracks: "My Soul Sings", "What Does It Sound Like", "Worthy Is the Lamb" and "Here Is Love", which he sang alongside his wife, Jenn Johnson. Johnson made an appearance on Dave Fitzgerald's debut album, Hope of Heaven: Live at Bethel Church, which was released on October 26, featuring on the song "Shine". Soon after Fitzgerald's release, Love Came Down - Live Acoustic Worship in the Studio, Brian Johnson's debut live album, was released by record labels Bethel and Kingsway Music on November 9. Love Came Down was produced by Jeremy Edwardson, and recorded at The Soundhouse, a studio owned by Jeremy Edwardson in Redding, California.

In 2011, Brian Johnson featured on five tracks including "You Are Good", "One Thing Remains" and "What Would I Have Done" alongside Jenn Johnson on Bethel Music's second live album, Be Lifted High, the first album by Bethel to register on Billboard's Christian Albums Chart, peaking at No. 7. 2012 saw Bethel Music release two albums that Brian Johnson featured in and co-produced: The Loft Sessions and For the Sake of the World. The Loft Sessions, released on January 24, was produced by Johnson alongside Daniel James Mackenzie and Rick McDonald and was the first album by Bethel Music to register on the Billboard 200 chart, peaking at No. 44. Johnson featured on three tracks: "One Thing Remains", "You Have Won Me" and "Angels". For the Sake of the World, released on October 1 via Bethel Music, with Johnson leading worship on five songs including "To Our God", "Forgiven" and the album title track, "For the Sake of the World". The album peaked at No. 51 on the Billboard 200 chart for three weeks, concurrently ranking at No. 2 on the Christian Albums chart. The song "Love Came Down", co-written by Brian Johnson alongside Jeremy Riddle, Ian McIntosh and Jeremy Edwardson, was featured on the twelfth season of American Idol as part of the "Songs I Wish I'd Written" night, with the performance of Kari Jobe's rendition as on Where I Find You done by the contestant Angie Miller, a top 3 finalist.

In 2013, Bethel Music released its first studio album, Tides, on September 3, with Johnson being featured in three songs: "Forever", "Strong in Us" and "For the Cross", which he sang alongside his wife, Jenn. Tides was the first album by Bethel to reach No. 1 on Billboard Christian Albums chart and also peaked at No. 30 on Billboard 200 chart, with nearly 15,000 copies sold as at September 11, 2013. He had an interview with Marcus Hathcock, editor-in-chief of NewReleaseToday, concerning the album and his life. Worship Leader ranked the song "Forever" from Bethel's 2013 studio album, Tides, which featured his vocals as lead, at Number 10 on its Top 20 Worship Songs of 2013 list.

Brian Johnson alongside Jeremy Riddle and Christa Black Gifford being nominated for two GMA Dove Awards in the Song of the Year and Praise & Worship Song of the Year categories for writing the song, "One Thing Remains" in August 2013. In October 2013 at the 44th Annual GMA Dove Awards in Nashville, Tennessee, Brian Johnson, together with his wife Jenn Johnson and Kristian Stanfill as well as the Passion band performed the song "One Thing Remains". However, the two Dove Awards were won by Matt Redman for the song "10,000 Reasons (Bless the Lord)". The American Society of Composers, Authors and Publishers (ASCAP) awarded "One Thing Remains" the No. 1 song for ASCAP Christian Music as well as the No. 1 Radio Single in 2013. According to Renewing Worship, "One Thing Remains" was also ranked No. 22 in The Top 100 Worship Songs of 2013 from PraiseCharts list.

Tides Live, a live rendition of its successful studio release, was released by Bethel Music in February 2014, with Johnson performing the same songs as he did on Tides.

In December 2014, Bethel Music made announcements concerning the release of We Will Not Be Shaken, their seventh live album, to be released on January 27, 2015. Brian Johnson was featured on two songs in the album, "We Will Not Be Shaken" and "Seas of Crimson", and also featured on the concert film, We Will Not Be Shaken, as a worship leader, with the film having been recorded at a mountaintop overlooking Shasta Lake in California. With the concert film having been premiered on Facebook for free ahead of the album's release, the song "We Will Not Be Shaken" was one of two songs made available for download upon preorder and was the most sold recording in Christian & Gospel Songs, peaking at No. 28 on Billboard's Christian Songs chart and at No. 32 on the Billboard's Christian Digital Songs Sales chart as of February 14, 2015. 30,000 copies of the album were sold in its debut week, with an additional 24,794 singles being sold too, leading the album to the top of the Billboard's Christian Albums Chart and peaking at No. 12 on the US Billboard 200 while topping the UK's Official Christian & Gospel Albums Chart.

In August 2015, the Gospel Music Association nominated Brian Johnson alongside Kari Jobe, Gabriel Wilson, Jenn Johnson, Christa Black Gifford and Joel Taylor for a GMA Dove Award in the "Worship Song of the Year" category for penning the song "Forever" (credited as "Forever (We Sing Hallelujah)"), with the result to be announced at the 46th Annual GMA Dove Awards in October. However, in October 2015, the award was won by Matt Maher for the song "Because He Lives (Amen)".

Bethel Music held its inaugural conference, Heaven Come Conference, in May 2016 at the Microsoft Theatre in Los Angeles, California with Johnson as a speaker and worship leader at the event. The event was broadcast on Daystar Television Network.

Brian Johnson also featured on Leeland's fifth studio album, Invisible, released in July 2016 having co-written and provided vocals for the song, "Son Was Lifted Up".

In August 2016, the Gospel Music Association announced the nominees of the 47th Annual GMA Dove Awards with Brian Johnson alongside Jonathan David Helser and Joel Case being nominated for writing the song, "No Longer Slaves" in the "Worship Song of the Year" category. On October 11, 2016, the song won the GMA Dove Award at a ceremony held at the Lipscomb University's Allen Arena in Nashville, Tennessee, with Jonathan David & Melissa Helser performing the song that night.

On January 13, 2017, Brian & Jenn Johnson announced the release of After All These Years, the duo's first album containing new songs in over a decade since the live LP release We Believe in 2006, was slated for January 27. After All These Years made its debut on Billboard Christian Albums chart at No. 1 with 16,000 equivalent album units sold as of February 8, 2017. The album also registered on the Billboard 200 at No. 21 and at No. 32 on the Canadian Albums chart. Brian Johnson had an interview with Sharefaith Magazine about the album and his worship ministry.

Brian Johnson, together with Joel Taylor and Jenn Johnson, received a certificate of recognition from the Redding City Council as the founders and representatives of the record label, Bethel Music, for its success at the 47th Annual GMA Dove Awards held in Nashville, Tennessee in 2016, having won five awards from nine nominations.

== Personal life ==
Johnson and his wife Jenn have three biological children as well as two adopted ones. The family resides on a farm in Redding, California.

== Discography ==
=== As a solo artist ===
Year	Album	Format	Label	Credits / Role	Ref.
2010	Love Came Down - Live Acoustic Worship in the Studio	CD; digital download	Bethel Music; Kingsway Music	Vocals, composer, acoustic guitar, executive producer.	

=== As Brian & Jenn Johnson ===
Year	Album	Format	Label	Credits / Role	Ref.
2001	Undone	CD	Bethel Music; Kingsway Music	Vocals, composer, acoustic guitar, electric guitar, arranger.	
2006	We Believe	CD; digital download	Bethel Music; Found Records; EMI; Kingsway Music	Vocals, composer, acoustic guitar, electric guitar, engineer, producer, executive producer	
2008	Where You Go I Go	CD	ION Records	Vocals, composer, acoustic guitar, electric guitar, digital editing, engineer, producer, executive producer.	
2017	After All These Years	CD; digital download; streaming	Bethel Music	Vocals, composer, acoustic guitar, executive producer	

=== As a featured artist ===
Year	Artist(s)	Album	Songs	Additional Credits / Role(s)	Ref.
2008	various artists	Deeper Songs for Prayer and Intercession	"Where You Go I Go" (with Jenn Johnson)		
2010	Dave Fitzgerald	Hope of Heaven: Live at Bethel Church	"Shine"		
2010	Bethel Music	Here Is Love	"My Soul Sings", "What Does It Sound Like", "Worthy Is the Lamb", "Here Is Love" (with Jenn Johnson)	Composer, executive producer, vocals, background vocals, acoustic guitar, electric guitar	
2010	various artists	Love Divine: The Songs of Charles Wesley for Today's Generation	"Come Thou Long Expected Jesus"		
2011	Bethel Music	Be Lifted High	"You Are Good", "One Thing Remains", "Be Lifted High", "What Would I Have Done" (with Jenn Johnson), "Love Came Down"	Composer, executive producer, acoustic guitar, vocals	
2012	Bethel Music	The Loft Sessions	"One Thing Remains", "You Have Won Me", "Angels"	Composer, producer, acoustic guitar, vocals, background vocals	
2012	Bethel Music	For the Sake of the World	"To Our God", "You Have Won Me", "Forgiven", "For the Sake of the World"	Composer, producer, acoustic guitar, vocals	
2013	Bethel Music	Tides	"Forever", "Strong in Us", "For the Cross" (with Jenn Johnson)	Composer, vocals, executive producer	
2013	Bethel Music	Discover Bethel Music (compilation)	"Where You Go I Go" (with Jenn Johnson), "One Thing Remains", "For the Cross" (with Jenn Johnson), "Love Came Down", "Greatly to Be Praised", "To Our God"		
2014	Bethel Music	Tides Live	"Forever", "Strong in Us", "For the Cross" (with Jenn Johnson)	Composer	
2015	Bethel Music	We Will Not Be Shaken	"We Will Not Be Shaken", "Seas of Crimson"	Composer, executive producer, acoustic guitar	
2016	Bethel Music	Have It All	"Have It All", "Colors (Spontaneous)" (with Lindsey Strand), "Sweet Praise (Spontaneous)" (with Jenn Johnson), "Greatness of Your Glory"	Acoustic guitar, composer, executive producer	
2016	Leeland	Invisible	"Son Was Lifted Up"	Composer	

=== As personnel ===
Year	Artist(s)	Album	Credits / Role(s)	Ref.
2013	Bethel Music	Without Words	Executive producer, composer	
2014	Bethel Music	You Make Me Brave	Executive producer, composer, acoustic guitar	
2015	Jesus Culture	This Is Jesus Culture	Producer, composer	
2015	Bethel Music	Without Words: Synesthesia	Composer	
2015	Amanda Cook	Brave New World	Executive producer	
2016	Jonathan David & Melissa Helser	Beautiful Surrender	Executive producer	
2017	Bethel Music	Starlight	Background vocals, composer, executive producer	

== Filmography ==
- We Will Not Be Shaken (2015) — as himself

== Awards and nominations ==
Year	Award	Category	Result
2013	GMA Dove Award	Song of the Year ("One Thing Remains")	Nominated
2013	GMA Dove Award	Praise & Worship Song of the Year ("One Thing Remains")	Nominated
2015	GMA Dove Award	Praise & Worship Song of the Year ("Forever (We Sing Hallelujah)")	Nominated
2016	GMA Dove Award	Worship Song of the Year ("No Longer Slaves")	Won

== See also ==
- List of Christian worship music artists
