= Chris Quilala =

American musician

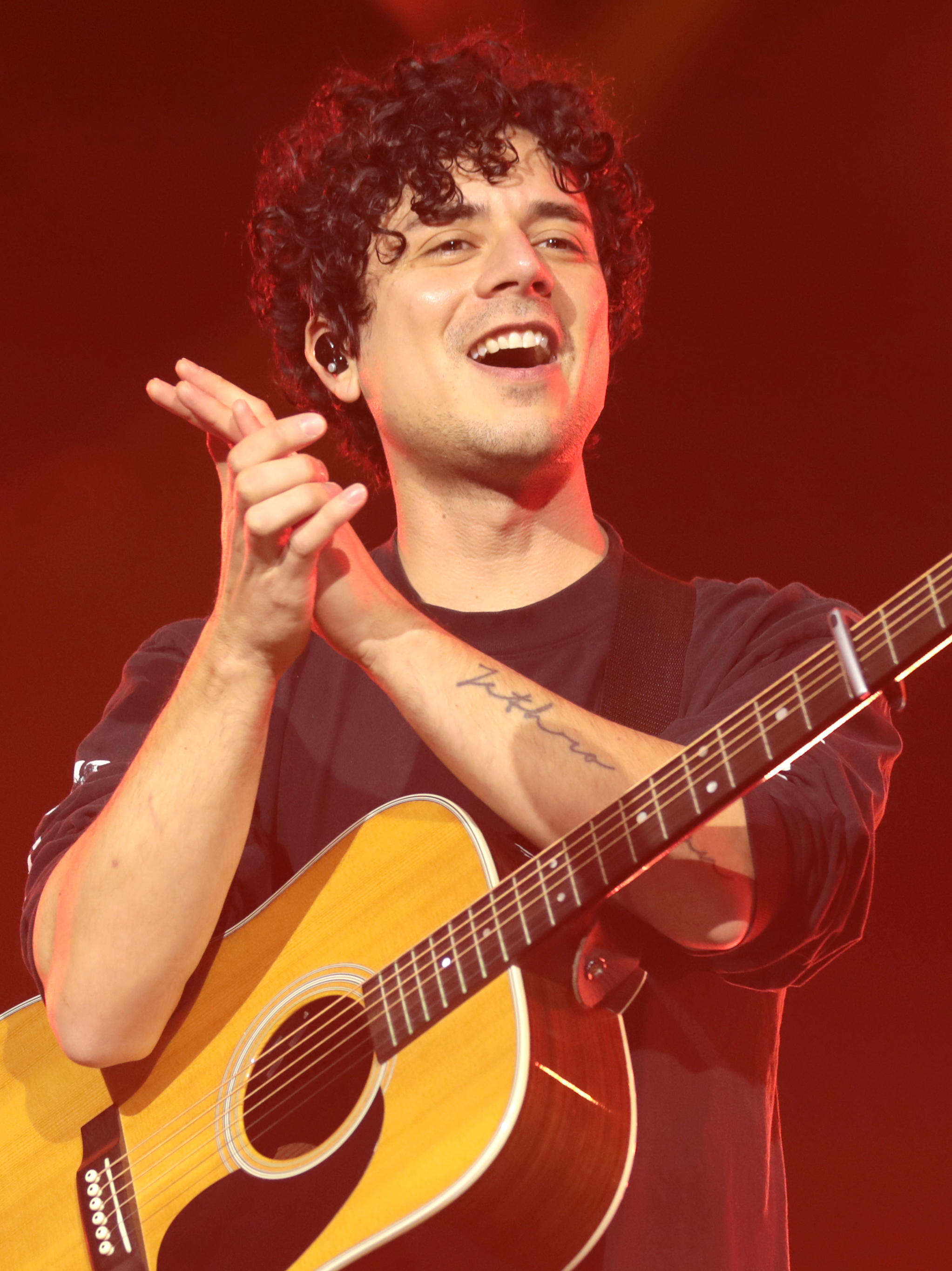
- Quilala in 2022

Background information
- Genres: Worship, Christian pop
- Occupations: Singer, songwriter, worship leader
- Instruments: Vocals, guitar, drums
- Years active: 2006–present
- Member of: Jesus Culture
- Formerly of: Bethel Music
- Website: jesusculture.com/music/artists/chris-quilala/

Christopher Mark Quilala (born November 22, 1982) is an American Christian musician and former worship leader with the Jesus Culture band and formerly with the Bethel Music collective. He primarily plays Christian pop and contemporary worship music.

== Personal life ==
Quilala met his former wife, Alyssa Gulino, when she was seventeen and he was twenty-five while they were in a church in Pasadena. They have five children together: Ella, Aria, Jethro (d. 2014), Liv and Maddex. After Chris and Alyssa's son Jethro died in December 2014, they wrote the song Miracles, which appeared on Jesus Culture's 2016 album Let It Echo. The Quilala family resides in Sacramento, California. Chris Quilala and Alyssa divorced in 2019.

In December 2019, Quilala was one of several evangelical Christian worship leaders to pray for President Donald Trump in the Oval Office.

== Music career ==
Quilala has been part of the Jesus Culture movement, since he was fourteen years old in 1996. He has been featured on many Jesus Culture albums, including Everything (2006), We Cry Out (2007), Your Love Never Fails (2008), Consumed (2009), Come Away (2010), Awakening: Live from Chicago (2011), Live From New York (with Martin Smith) (2012), Unstoppable Love (2014), and Let It Echo (2016). Quilala's debut solo album, Split the Sky, was released in 2016. Quilala co-wrote the song "Your Love Awakens Me" with Phil Wickham, which appears on Wickham's album Children of God (2016).

Along with being a guitarist, Chris is also a drummer. He started his musical career playing drums for Bethel Music. He was the drummer for the albums For the Sake of the World (2012) and Be Lifted High (2011) as well as Brian & Jenn Johnson's albums, We Believe (2006) and Where You Go I Go (2008). He was also featured on Bethel's debut album Here Is Love (2010) performing the song "King of Wonders".

== Discography ==
=== Albums ===
List of albums, with selected chart positions
Title	Album details	Peak chart positions
Title	Album details	US Christ.
Split the Sky	Debut album; Released: November 11, 2016; Label: Jesus Culture/Sparrow Records; Format: CD, digital download, streaming	8

=== Singles ===
==== As lead artist ====
Single	Year	Peak positions		Album
Single	Year	US Christ.	Christ. Digital	Album
"Because of Your Love"	2016	—	—	Split the Sky
"Won My Heart"	2016	—	—	Split the Sky
"After My Heart"	2016	—	—	Split the Sky
"You Cannot Be Stopped" (with Phil Wickham)	2019	35	20	Non-album singles
"Nothing But Good"	2019	—	—	Non-album singles

==== As a featured artist ====
Single	Year	Peak positions				Album
Single	Year	US Christ.	Christ. Airplay	Christ. Digital	Christ. Stream	Album
"Fierce" (Jesus Culture featuring Chris Quilala)	2016	14	15	16	22	Let It Echo
"Miracles" (Jesus Culture featuring Chris Quilala)	2016	50	—	—	—	Let It Echo

=== Other charted songs ===
Single	Year	Peak positions	Album
Single	Year	US Christ.	Album
"Halls of Heaven" (Jesus Culture featuring Chris Quilala)	2017	47	Love Has a Name

== Awards ==
=== Grammy Awards ===
Year	Nominee/Work	Award	Result
2018	Living with a Fire	Best Contemporary Christian Music Album	Nominated

=== GMA Dove Awards ===
Year	Nominee/Work	Award	Result
2017	"Fierce" (Jesus Culture featuring Chris Quilala)	Worship Song of the Year	Nominated

=== ASCAP Christian Awards ===
Year	Nominee/Work	Result
2017	"Fierce" (Jesus Culture featuring Chris Quilala)	Won
2017	"Your Love Awakens Me" Phil Wickham	Won

=== BMI Christian Awards ===
Year	Nominee/Work	Result
2018	"Your Love Awakens Me" Phil Wickham	Won
