= Tides (Bethel Music album) =

2013 studio album by Bethel Music

Studio album by Bethel Music
- Released: September 3, 2013
- Recorded: 2013
- Genre: Worship; contemporary Christian music
- Length: 61:14
- Label: Bethel Music
- Producer: Daniel Mackenzie; Gabriel Wilson

Bethel Music studio album chronology
| Tides (2013) | Peace (2020) |

Bethel Music chronology
| Without Words (2013) | Tides (2013) | Discover Bethel Music (2013) |

Singles from Tides
- 1. "Chasing You" Released: September 6, 2013

Tides is the first studio album by California-based worship collective Bethel Music, it is also the sixth album overall to be released. The album was released on September 3, 2013 by the group's imprint label, Bethel Music. Daniel Mackenzie and Gabriel Wilson produced the album together.

== Background ==
Brian Johnson had an interview with Marcus Hathcock, the editor-in-chief of NewReleaseToday. When Hathcock questioned him about how the album's title and the imagery of the album cover came about, he responded saying:

I didn't arrive at it, actually. Some of our team members did. Actually I had a dream, though. I had a dream about turning tides. A lot of it, though, has to do with the season we're in. There's been a lot of coming, a lot of going with people—a totally different, shifting kind of season. I guess that's the creative way of saying what that season was. We had the idea last-minute to take the whole team to the coast and do the photo shoot at the water.

– Brian Johnson, NewReleaseToday

In an interview with Sharefaith Magazine, Jenn Johnson spoke of the album having its origins in an encounter she had on a mountaintop, saying:

I had an encounter with the Lord on a mountaintop. I had been in a kind of a fog, just struggling to gain a breakthrough with some things. It was a difficult time. Ministry is fun, but can also be a challenge. I went on to this mountain and spoke to the Lord: 'God I know you're with me, but please come closer. Let me feel you; let me know what to do.' ... He sorted me out, He gave me clarity. I went from just knowing he was with me, to being able to feel him with everything I am.

– Jenn Johnson, Sharefaith Magazine

Jenn Johnson went on to add that the experience birthed the song "I Can Feel You".

== Singles ==
The song "Chasing You", featuring Jenn Johnson's vocals, impacted Christian radio on September 6, 2013 as the lead single of the album.

== Critical reception ==
Professional ratings
Review scores
| Source | Rating |
|---|---|
| AllMusic | 3.5/5 stars |
| CM Addict | 4/5 stars |
| Cross Rhythms | 7/10 squares |
| Indie Vision Music | 4/5 stars |
| Jesus Freak Hideout | 4/5 stars |
| Louder Than The Music | 4/5 stars |
| NewReleaseToday | 4.5/5 stars |

David Jeffries, giving the album three and a half stars at AllMusic, states that the album allows for "more electro tones and synthetic sounds,". Julia Kitzing, reviewing the album for CM Addict whilst rating it four stars, says, "The album features songs that offer adoration, instruction, and worship. The songs speak about not only what God has done but what He is doing both in the high and low tides of life. There is something for everyone on this album." At Cross Rhythms, A.T. Bradford rated the album seven squares out of ten, concluding that "All in all, a reasonable though not particularly outstanding set from the renowned Redding, California church." Jonathan Andre, indicating in a three star review at Indie Vision Music, says, "Bethel’s first studio album is a great way to start off with Bethel if you haven’t listened to them before (or even if you have)," and goes on to conclude in a congratulatory manner, "Well done Bethel for such a prolific and powerful album!" Rating the album four stars by Jesus Freak Hideout, Drew Creal thinks that "For a worship record, Tides is incredibly innovative" and concludes that "Bethel places a firm flag in the ground with Tides, reshaping and redefining again what is possible with a worship record." Awarding the album four and a half stars from Louder Than The Music, Jono Davies writes, "The whole album has great worshipful lyrics that dig deep into the soul." Kevin Davis of NewReleaseToday was superbly positive to the album and rated it four and a half stars. He exclaimed that "I'm impressed by the consistent quality and fresh worshipful songs that come from Bethel Music. This album is no exception. Tides is about proclaiming the majesty of God and crying out for His Presence throughout this incredible worship experience."

=== Accolades ===
The song, "Forever" which featured Brian Johnson's vocals, was No. 10 on the Worship Leader's Top 20 Worship Songs of 2013 list.

== Commercial performance ==
Tides was the first album by Bethel Music to reach No. 1 on Billboard Christian Albums chart and also peaked at No. 30 on Billboard 200 chart, with nearly 15,000 copies sold as at September 11, 2013. Concurrently, the single, "Chasing You", which featured Jenn Johnson's vocals, was also one of the most downloaded digital Christian singles with 4,000 copies of the song sold.

== Track listing ==
Standard edition
| No. | Title | Writer(s) | Worship leader(s) | Length |
|---|---|---|---|---|
| 1. | "Chasing You" | Jenn Johnson; Gabriel Wilson; Ian McIntosh; Jeremy Riddle; Daniel Mackenzie | Jenn Johnson | 4:39 |
| 2. | "Breaking Through" | Riddle | Jeremy Riddle | 4:05 |
| 3. | "Forever" | Brian Johnson; Kari Jobe; J. Johnson; Wilson; Joel Taylor; Christa Black | Brian Johnson | 5:26 |
| 4. | "Letting Go" | Steffany Frizzell Gretzinger; Wilson | Steffany Gretzinger | 4:54 |
| 5. | "Come Awaken Love" | Hunter Thompson | Hunter G K Thompson | 4:26 |
| 6. | "Strong in Us" | B. Johnson; Kristian Stanfill; Taylor; Wilson; McIntosh | Brian Johnson | 4:25 |
| 7. | "I Can Feel You" | J. Johnson; Gretzinger; MacKenzie; Thompson; Wilson | Jenn Johnson | 6:38 |
| 8. | "Give Me Jesus" | Matt Stinton | Matt Stinton | 4:39 |
| 9. | "Be Still" | Gretzinger; Wilson | Steffany Gretzinger | 4:57 |
| 10. | "Heaven's Song" | Riddle | Jeremy Riddle | 5:57 |
| 11. | "Ascend" | William Matthews; Gretzinger; Bobby Strand; Mackenzie | William Matthews | 3:56 |
| 12. | "Tides" | Mackenzie | | 1:33 |
| 13. | "For the Cross" | J. Johnson; B. Johnson; Wilson; McIntosh | Jenn Johnson; Brian Johnson | 5:37 |
| Total length: | | | | 61:14 |

iTunes bonus video content
| No. | Title | Narrator | Length |
|---|---|---|---|
| 14. | "Chasing You" (Song Story) | Jeremy Riddle | 4:08 |
| 15. | "Letting Go" (Song Story) | Steffany Gretzinger | 3:30 |
| 16. | "Strong in Us" (Song Story) | Brian Johnson | 3:09 |
| Total length: | | | 72:01 |

== Tides: The Streaming EP ==
Tides: The Streaming EP

EP by Bethel Music
- Released: November 21, 2013
- Genre: Worship; contemporary Christian music
- Length: 19:04
- Label: Bethel Music

On November 21, 2013, Bethel Music released Tides: The Streaming EP, an extended play on streaming media platforms. The EP only has the first four songs that are found on the full-length album.

The Streaming EP release
| No. | Title | Length |
|---|---|---|
| 1. | "Chasing You" | 4:39 |
| 2. | "Breaking Through" | 4:05 |
| 3. | "Forever" | 5:26 |
| 4. | "Letting Go" | 4:54 |
| Total length: | | 19:04 |

== Personnel ==
Adapted from AllMusic.

Singers

- Steffany Gretzinger – vocals
- Kalley Heiligenthal – backing vocals
- Brian Johnson – vocals
- Ran Jackson – backing vocals
- Jenn Johnson – vocals
- Daniel Mackenzie – backing vocals
- Graham Moore – backing vocals
- Jeremy Riddle – vocals
- Matt Stinton – vocals
- Hunter Thompson – vocals
- Gabriel Wilson – backing vocals

Musicians

- Daniel Mackenzie – pianos, programming, bass, drones
- Gabriel Wilson – pianos, guitars, percussion, drones
- Chris Greely – electric guitars
- Michael Pope – electric guitars, hi-string guitar
- Bobby Strand – electric guitars
- Brandon Aaronson – bass
- Graham Moore – drums, percussion
- Jeremy Larson – strings, string arrangements

== Production ==
- Daniel Mackenzie – producer, engineer
- Gabriel Wilson – producer, engineer, album concept
- Chris Greely – engineer
- Aaron Knott – assistant engineer
- Craig Alvin – mixing
- Brad Blackwood – mastering
- Kiley Hill – project manager
- Nathan Grubbs – design, cover photography
- Daley Hake – photography
- Luke Sankey – photography

== Charts ==
=== Album ===
| Chart (2013) | Peak position |
|---|---|
| Canadian Albums (Billboard) | 25 |
| Dutch Albums (Album Top 100) | 97 |
| Norwegian Albums (VG-lista) | 16 |
| UK Albums (OCC) | 79 |
| UK Christian and Gospel Albums (OCC) | 1 |
| US Billboard 200 | 30 |
| US Christian Albums (Billboard) | 1 |
| US Digital Albums (Billboard) | 12 |
| US Independent Albums (Billboard) | 4 |

=== Singles ===
| Year | Single | Peak positions |
| Year | Single | Christian Digital Songs |
|---|---|---|
| 2013 | "Chasing You" | 13 |

== Release history ==
| Region | Date | Version | Format | Label | Ref. |
|---|---|---|---|---|---|
| Various | September 3, 2013 | Standard | CD; digital download | Bethel Music | |
| Various | November 21, 2013 | The Streaming EP | streaming | Bethel Music | |
