= Undone (Brian & Jenn Johnson album) =

Live album by Brian & Jenn Johnson
- Released: 2001
- Recorded: 2001
- Venue: Bethel Church, Redding, California, U.S.
- Genre: Worship; CCM
- Length: 62:24
- Label: Bethel Music; Kingsway Music
- Producer: Matthew Donovan

Brian & Jenn Johnson chronology
Undone (2001)	We Believe (2006)

Undone is the first live album by Brian & Jenn Johnson. The album was released in 2001 by Bethel Music and Kingsway Music. Matthew Donovan worked on the production of the album. Leah Märi also featured on the album.

== Critical reception ==
Professional ratings
Review scores
Source	Rating
Cross Rhythms	8/10 squares
Eden.co.uk	9/10

Chris Coupe, in a review for Cross Rhythms, rated the album eight out of ten squares, saying that the album "demonstrates many of the strengths which make the worship emanating from Bethel Church stand out from the crowd." Bestowing the album a score of nine out of ten at Eden.co.uk, Sam Hailes says "Undone is like watching a live worship event from behind the scenes" and that the album wins the "authenticity prize".

== Track listing ==
Undone
No.	Title	Writer(s)	Length
1.	"We Cry Out"	Brian Johnson	4:44
2.	"Revival Generation"	B. Johnson	3:34
3.	"O Taste and See"	Jenn Johnson, B. Johnson	5:25
4.	"Shadow of Your Wings"	Heather Clark	3:58
5.	"Day Unto Day"	B. Johnson	7:56
6.	"Oh How I Love You"	B. Johnson	7:51
7.	"You Are So Beautiful"	B. Johnson	5:06
8.	"Broken for You"	B. Johnson	5:05
9.	"Undone" (featuring Leah Märi)	B. Johnson	5:41
10.	"Worthy Is The Lamb"	B. Johnson	4:57
11.	"Home"	B. Johnson	8:07
Total length:			62:48

== Release history ==
Region	Date	Version	Format	Label	Ref.
United States	2001	Standard	CD	Bethel Music	
Worldwide	June 30, 2010	Standard	Digital download	Bethel Music	
United Kingdom	July 30, 2012	Standard	CD	Kingsway Music	
