= Worship pastor =

Person whose ministry uses Christian music

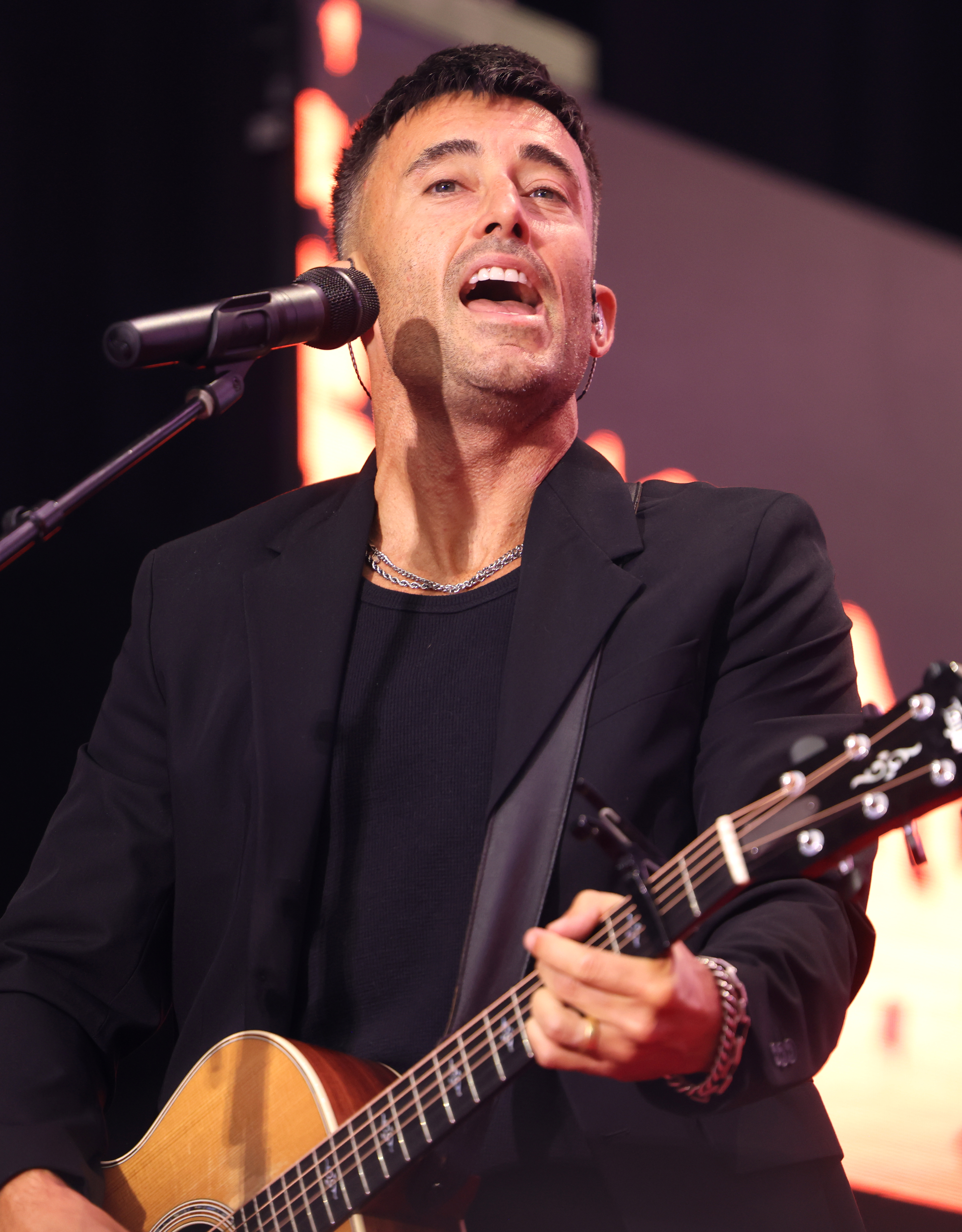
Phil Wickham leading worship

A worship pastor usually refers to a person who ministers using contemporary worship music or other Christian music, as well as counseling and pastoring members of the church's music team and worship ministries. This is a distinct role within a church, that contains elements of, and overlaps with some of the roles of a church music director and pastor, while being neither. Usually a worship pastor will also be considered a worship leader of the church with the added responsibilities of caring for members of a team, including other worship leaders and musicians.

== See also ==
- Precentor
