= William Matthews (musician) =

American Christian musician (born 1983)

- Born: William Irvin Matthews; November 5, 1983 (age 42); Detroit, Michigan, United States
- Origin: Los Angeles, California, United States
- Genres: CCM, worship
- Occupations: Singer, songwriter
- Instruments: Vocals, guitar
- Years active: 2011–present
- Labels: Bethel, Kingsway
- Website: williammatthewsmusic.com

William Irvin Matthews (born November 5, 1983) is an American Christian musician. He started his music career in 2011, with the release of Hope's Anthem, by Bethel Music alongside Kingsway Music.

== Early life ==
Matthews was born William Irvin Matthews on November 5, 1983, in the city of Detroit to a father who was a preacher and a mother who was a choir director. At 12 years old, he moved with his family to Raleigh, North Carolina, where he started honing his acumen as a songwriter. He moved to Kansas City, Missouri in 2007, where he was on staff at International House of Prayer. Subsequently, he relocated in 2009 to Redding, California at the request of Kim Walker-Smith, where he met Brian and Jenn Johnson. William joined staff and remained a member of Bethel Church for 8 years.

In 2014, Matthews moved to Los Angeles, citing creative exploration and a desire to move in a new direction. Matthews remained on the Bethel Music label post-departure contributing to the Bethel Music compilation album Have it All (Live). On November 29, 2016, Bethel Music released a statement via their November newsletter and also on their website communicating, "As of June 13, 2016, Bethel Music and William Matthews have agreed that William will no longer be affiliated with Bethel Music, and William will no longer be in leadership within any of the worship communities at Bethel Church." Matthews later explained, "As a worship leader, you have to be all things for all people; you're not an artist... I'd rather be an artist than a worship leader." In 2026 he revealed that he had been in fact "publicly outed on a stage by Christian leaders cosplaying as my pastors".

== Music career ==
His music recording career commenced in 2011 with the album, Hope's Anthem, released on July 26, 2011, by Bethel Music alongside Kingsway Music. The album was his breakthrough release upon the Billboard charts, where it placed at No. 27 on the Christian Albums chart and No. 19 on the Heatseekers Albums chart.

== Discography ==
List of selected studio albums, with selected chart positions
Title	Album details	Peak chart positions	
Title	Album details	US Chr	US Heat
Hope's Anthem	Released: July 26, 2011; Label: Bethel/Kingsway; CD, digital download	27	19
Kosmos	Released: November 9, 2018; Label: Odd Feast; Digital download	—	—
