= Jeremy Riddle =

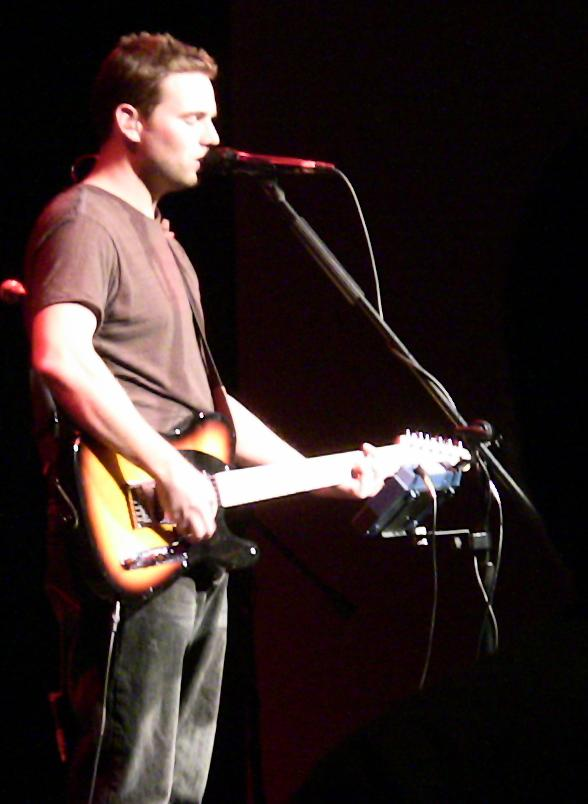
- Jeremy Riddle seen in concert in 2009.

Background information
- Born: Jeremy Michael Riddle; October 18, 1977 (age 49); Mount Holly, New Jersey, U.S.
- Genres: Worship music, Christian rock, CCM
- Occupations: Singer; songwriter; musician; worship pastor
- Instruments: Vocals, guitar
- Labels: Vineyard Music, Bethel Music, Watershed Music Group
- Website: jeremyriddle.com

Jeremy Michael Riddle (born October 18, 1977) is an American Christian musician, songwriter, and worship leader, best known for a long tenure as an ensemble leader with Bethel Music.

== Early life and education ==
Jeremy Riddle was born in Mount Holly, New Jersey on October 18, 1977.

== Career ==
Jeremy Riddle's debut album, Full Attention, was released on March 6, 2007. It peaked on the Billboard Top Christian and Gospel Albums Chart at No. 47, and the only single released from the album, "Sweetly Broken", peaked at No. 19 on both the Billboard Hot Christian Songs and Christian Airplay Charts. It has also been used as a contemporary worship song.

In 2009, Riddle released The Now and Not Yet through Varietal Records. The album has appeared on two charts, Billboard's Hot Christian Albums format (peaking at No. 15) and the Top Heatseekers (peaking at No. 11).

The first single off the new album is "Bless His Name", written by Riddle's friend Tony Sanchez. The song charted on Billboard's Hot Christian Songs format, peaking at No. 36.

Riddle released albums Prepare The Way: Live in 2010 and Furious in 2011.

From September 2011 to June 2019, Riddle was the worship community pastor at Bethel Church in Redding, California, where he frequently led worship. He appeared on many albums by Bethel Music. Some of the songs from Bethel music included "This is Amazing Grace" and "In Your Light" from the album For the Sake of the World. "This is Amazing Grace" song was written by Phil Wickham, Josh Farro and Riddle, and produced by Pete Kipley. Billboard named it No. 1 on the Christian Airplay Songs chart for 2014.

As of December 2021, Riddle and his wife were serving at Dwelling Place Anaheim (then Vineyard Anaheim) as the Worship, Creativity and Prayer Pastors, a position they began in 2019 and held until January 2024.

== Personal life ==
In 2019 Riddle announced that he and his wife felt the Lord leading them back to Southern California.

== Discography ==
=== with Recon Records ===
- Beautiful Jesus (2003)

=== with Vineyard ===
- Full Attention (2007)
- The Now and Not Yet (2009)
- Prepare the Way: Live (2010)
- Furious (2011)

=== with Bethel Music ===
- Be Lifted High (2011) (by Bethel Music)
- The Loft Sessions (2012) (by Bethel Music)
- For the Sake of the World (2012) (by Bethel Music)
- Tides (2013) (by Bethel Music)
- Tides Live (2014) (by Bethel Music)
- Have It All (2016) (by Bethel Music)
- Starlight (2017) (by Bethel Music)
- More (2017) (by Bethel Music)
- Moments: Mighty Sound (2018) (by Bethel Music)

=== Independent ===
- Joy to the World - EP (2018) (Jeremy Riddle/Watershed Music Group)
- Holy Ground: Live Around The World (2020) (Watershed Music Group)
- Live In The Prayer Room (2022)
