= David C Cook =

American nonprofit Christian publisher

- Founded: 1875
- Founder: David Caleb Cook
- Country of origin: United States
- Headquarters location: Colorado Springs, Colorado
- Key people: Bill Reeves, CEO
- Publication types: Books
- Imprints: Kingsway; Gospel Light; Standard Publishing; Esther Press; Group Publishing
- Official website: davidccook.org

David C Cook is an American nonprofit Christian publisher based in Colorado Springs, Colorado. It was founded as a provider of Sunday school curriculum and is a major publisher of these materials. It also publishes fiction and nonfiction books and distributes supporting materials like toys and games. Its best selling authors include Francis Chan, Gary Thomas, and J. Warner Wallace. For many years it published a Christian comic book, Sunday Pix, with stories about the adventures of Christian heroes in different eras and in many parts of the world.

== History ==
An author and leader in the American Sunday school movement, David Caleb Cook, established the company in Chicago in 1875. He was motivated to provide affordable educational materials for children who had been left homeless due to the Great Chicago fire.

Cook worked as a printer's devil in his father's print shop and as a volunteer in Sunday schools around Chicago. He adjudged that most available Sunday school literature "suffered from (containing) either loose theology or poor design". With his wife, Marguerite, he established a newspaper, Our Sunday School Gem, hoping to provide quality Sunday school literature before starting his eponymous publishing company. As the twentieth century began, the company moved to larger facilities in suburban Elgin, Illinois, northwest of Chicago. By the 1920s, the company produced more than 50 titles and had an annual circulation of two million.

The company moved its headquarters from Elgin to Colorado Springs, Colorado, in 1995. It operated with the name "Cook Communications Ministries" before reverting to "David C Cook" in 2007.

In September 2021, former Frito-Lay Inc, Mac Tools, and Walmart executive John Aden was named chief executive officer for David C Cook.

In December 2023, Bill Reeves, the former CEO of Educational Media Foundation, was named as chief executive officer.

In September 2025, the company rebranded as Cook Media Global. The rebranding comes amid acquisitions of music companies, expanding from a publishing organization.

=== Acquisitions and imprints ===
David C Cook acquired Kingsway in 1993, Scripture Press/Victor Books in 1995, and Integrity Music in 2011.

In 2015, David C Cook acquired assets from Gospel Light and Standard Publishing, including the Gospel Light Curriculum line, the Standard Lesson Commentary, HeartShaper, and Route 52 Curriculum from Standard, among other products. The acquisition positioned David C Cook as the second largest Sunday School curriculum publisher in the world behind LifeWay Christian Resources in Nashville. In 2016, David C Cook Canada was bought by management and merged with Augsburg Fortress Canada, changing its name to Parasource Marketing & Distribution.

In 2022, the Esther Press imprint was added, focusing empowerment of women as leaders in their communities and as disciples of Jesus. In 2024, David C Cook acquired Group Publishing, a curriculum publisher.

In 2025, Cook Media Global acquired record label Fair Trade Services (formerly INO Records).

== Foundation ==
David C Cook is a nonprofit publisher which uses the proceeds from its sales for global ministry. The David C Cook Foundation was founded in 1942 by Francis Kerr Cook "to aid and promote the work of religious education without profit to any person or group". The projects of the foundation include providing The Life on Life curriculum and The Action Bible, translated into local languages, for children's ministry use around the world.
