= Without Words: Genesis =

Remix album by Bethel Music
- Released: November 15, 2019
- Recorded: 2019
- Genre: Contemporary worship music; instrumental
- Length: 67:35
- Label: Bethel Music
- Producer: Seth Mosley; Lael

Bethel Music remix album chronology
After All These Years (Instrumental) (2017)	Without Words: Genesis (2019)

Bethel Music chronology
Bethel Music en Español (2019)	Without Words: Genesis (2019)	Peace (2020)

Without Words: Genesis (stylized GENESIS) is the fourth remix album by Bethel Music, and their eighteenth full-length overall. It is also the third installment of the Without Words series. It was released on November 15, 2019 through its own imprint label, Bethel Music. Seth Mosley and Lael collaborated on the production of the album.

Without Words: Genesis was positively received by critics and also attained commercial success, having debuted on the US Christian Albums at No. 6.

== Background ==
On November 4, 2019, Bethel Music announced that they will be releasing Without Words: Genesis on November 15. The album is the third installment of the Without Words series, being preceded by Without Words (2013) and Without Words: Synesthesia (2015). The album is an instrumental collection which features the remixed versions of twelve renowned worship songs and seven original interludes. The remixed songs included hits from the Bethel Music community such as "Reckless Love", "Stand in Your Love" and "Raise a Hallelujah" as well as popular songs by other contemporary worship artists such as Hillsong Worship's "What a Beautiful Name" and Elevation Worship's "Do It Again".

Joel Taylor, the CEO of Bethel Music, spoke of how the album's soundscape is interwoven with the story of Creation, saying:

We wanted to tell the story of where it all began: when God the Father created the universe and everything in it, and when He created mankind in His image for His pleasure. Returning to the intimacy of God and man alone in a garden where Adam worshipped Him for the first time, our hope is that Without Words: Genesis creates an intimate space for resting in God’s presence and fills the heart of the listener with awe and wonder of our magnificent Creator. — Joel Taylor

== Critical reception ==
Professional ratings
Review scores
Source	Rating
365 Days of Inspiring Media	4.5/5
The Christian Beat	4.5/5 stars
Louder Than the Music	4/5 stars

Jonathan Andre shared in his 365 Days of Inspiring Media review that Without Words: Genesis is an album which "hopefully peels back the layers of our own hearts and challenges ourselves into what we perceive worship music and what God wants us to see it as." Reviewing for The Christian Beat, Sarah Baylor stated that the album "gives the worshipper the freedom to worship in different ways," and concluded that it "features skillfully composed songs all while keeping the main theme of each and purposefully drawing the listener into worship." Jono Davies at Louder Than the Music opined that "Yes, the album in the main is reflective, but it also somehow at times has so much more going on. Not only does it have exciting sounds and moments, it also has creative, uplifting sounds that are enjoyable from the off, the album also has so much more to give than just being background music." Sight Magazine's Marcus Cheong gave a favourable review of the album, calling Without Words: Genesis "a confident expression of both praise and artistry."

=== Accolades ===
Awards
Year	Organization	Award	Result	Ref
2020	GMA Dove Awards	Instrumental Album of the Year	Nominated	

Year-end lists
Publication	Accolade	Rank	Ref.
365 Days of Inspiring Media	Top 50 Albums of 2019	30	

== Commercial performance ==
In the United States, Without Words: Genesis launched at No. 6 on the U.S. Billboard Christian Albums chart dated November 30, 2019.

== Track listing ==
Without Words: Genesis
No.	Title	Writer(s)	Length
1.	"Light" (Interlude)		2:04
2.	"What a Beautiful Name"	Brooke Ligertwood; Ben Fielding	4:56
3.	"Goodness of God"	Ed Cash; Ben Fielding; Jason Ingram; Brian Johnson; Jenn Johnson	4:29
4.	"Atmospheres" (Interlude)		2:12
5.	"Ain't No Grave"	Claude Ely; Jonathan David Helser; Melissa Helser; Molly Skaggs	3:55
6.	"Living Hope"	B. Johnson; Phil Wickham	4:22
7.	"Earth & Sea" (Interlude)		4:11
8.	"Stand in Your Love"	Ethan Hulse; Josh Baldwin; Mark Harris; Rita Springer	4:11
9.	"Tremble"	Andres Figueroa; Hank Bentley; Mariah McManus; Mia Fieldes	3:21
10.	"Galaxies" (Interlude)		1:41
11.	"No Longer Slaves"	J. D. Helser; B. Johnson; Joel Case	5:02
12.	"Lion and the Lamb"	Leeland Mooring; B. Johnson; Brenton Brown	4:22
13.	"Life" (Interlude)		1:50
14.	"This Is a Move"	Brandon Lake; Tasha Cobbs Leonard; Tony Brown; Nate Moore	4:59
15.	"Raise a Hallelujah"	J. D. Helser; M. Helser; Skaggs; Jake Stevens	4:10
16.	"Mankind" (Interlude)		1:42
17.	"Do It Again"	Steven Furtick; Matt Redman; Chris Brown; Mack Brock	5:38
18.	"Reckless Love"	Cory Asbury; Caleb Culver; Ran Jackson	5:18
19.	"Rest" (Interlude)		1:29
Total length:			67:35

== Charts ==
=== Weekly charts ===
Weekly chart performance for Without Words: Genesis
Chart (2019)	Peak position
US Christian Albums (Billboard)	6

=== Year-end charts ===
Year-end chart performance for Without Words: Genesis
Chart (2020)	Position
US Christian Albums (Billboard)	99

== Release history ==
Region	Date	Format(s)	Label(s)	Ref.
Various	November 15, 2019	Digital download; streaming	Bethel Music	
