= 51st GMA Dove Awards =

2020 US music awards ceremony

- Date: October 20, 2020
- Location: TBN, Hendersonville, Tennessee
- Country: United States

Highlights
- Most awards: Various artists (2 each)
- Most nominations: Jason Ingram (8)
- Website: www.doveawards.com

Television/radio coverage
- Network: TBN (October 30, 2020)
- Produced by: Paul Wright III; Curtis Stoneberger
- Directed by: De'Niel Phipps

The 51st Annual GMA Dove Awards presentation ceremony was recorded on Tuesday, September 1, 2020, through October 5, 2020, at the TBN in Hendersonville, Tennessee. The awards are given by the Gospel Music Association (GMA) recognizing the accomplishments of musicians and other figures within the Christian music industry for the year 2020. The awards show aired on the Trinity Broadcasting Network on Friday, October 30, 2020.

The nominations were announced by the GMA on August 13, 2020, with producer and songwriter Jason Ingram leading eight nominations among non-artists, while Zach Williams and For King & Country led the artist nominations with six. Due to the ongoing COVID-19 pandemic, the ceremony featured pre-recorded performances and no live acceptance speeches.

== Nominations announcement ==
The nominations were announced on August 13, 2020, by Brooke Ligertwood of Hillsong Worship, Joel Smallbone of For King & Country, Anthony Brown, Christine D'Clario, Joseph Habedank, and Aaron Cole from their individual homes, which was broadcast on the GMA Dove Awards' Facebook page, YouTube channel and SiriusXM/Pandora.

== Nominees and winners ==
This is a complete list of the nominees for the 51st GMA Dove Awards. Winners are in bold.

=== General ===
Song of the Year

- "Almost Home"
  - (writers) Barry Graul, Bart Millard, Ben Glover, Mike Scheuchzer, Nathan Cochran, Robby Shaffer, (publishers) 9t One Songs, Ariose Music, No Sappy Music, Tunes of MercyMe
- "Burn the Ships"
  - (writers) Joel Smallbone, Luke Smallbone, Matt Hales, Seth Mosley, (publishers) CentricSongs, Kilns Music, Method to the Madness, Shankel Songs, Shaun Shankel Pub Designee, Warner-Tamerlane Publishing Corp., WC Music Corp.
- "Dead Man Walking"
  - (writers) Emily Weisband, Jeremy Camp, Jordan Sapp, (publishers) Capitol CMG Paragon, Only in You Publishing, Songs By JSapp
- "Deliver Me (This is My Exodus)"
  - (writers) Desmond Davis, Donald Lawrence, Marshon Lewis, Robert Woolridge, William Stokes, (publishers) QW Publishing, William Stokes Publishing House and Primary Wave Beats, Shonmacmusic, ROBBASS ENC, Desmond Davis Designee
- "Holy Water"
  - (writers) Andrew Bergthold, Ed Cash, Franni Cash, Martin Cash, Scott Cash, (publishers) Andrew Bergthold Designee, Capitol CMG Genesis, Capitol CMG Paragon, We The Kingdom ASCAP Designee, We The Kingdom Music
- "King of Kings"
  - (writers) Brooke Ligertwood, Jason Ingram, Scott Ligertwood, (publishers) Fellow Ships Music, Hillsong Music Publishing Australia, So Essential Tunes
- "Love Theory"
  - (writers) Kirk Franklin, (publishers) Aunt Gertrude Music Publishing LLC
- "Nobody"
  - (writers) Bernie Herms, Mark Hall, Matthew West, (publishers) Be Essential Songs, Highly Combustible Music, House of Story Music Publishing, My Refuge Music, One77 Songs
- "Rescue"
  - (writers) Jason Ingram, Lauren Daigle, Paul Mabury, (publishers) CentricSongs, Fellow Ships Music, Flychild Publishing, See You at the Pub, So Essential Tunes
- "Rescue Story"
  - (writers) Andrew Ripp, Ethan Hulse, Jonathan Smith, Zach Williams, (publishers) Anthems of Hope, Be Essential Songs, Cashagamble Jet Music, EGH Music Publishing, Songs By Fishbone, Wisteria Drive
- "See a Victory"
  - (writers) Ben Fielding, Chris Brown, Jason Ingram, Steven Furtick, (publishers) Fellow Ships Music, Music by Elevation Worship Publishing, SHOUT! Music Publishing Australia, So Essential Tunes
- "The God Who Stays"
  - (writers) AJ Pruis, Jonathan Smith, Matthew West, (publishers) Be Essential Songs, Cashagamble Jet Music, Combustion Five, Highly Combustible Music, One77 Songs, Two Story House Music
- **"Way Maker"**
  - **(writer) Osinachi Kalu Okoro Egbu, (publisher) Integrity Music Europe**

Songwriter of the Year

- Chris Brown
- Kirk Franklin
- Lauren Daigle
- Matthew West
- **Zach Williams**

Songwriter of the Year (Non-artist)

- Ed Cash
- Ethan Hulse
- **Jason Ingram**
- Jonathan Smith
- Paul Mabury

Contemporary Christian Artist of the Year

- For King & Country, Curb | Word
- Hillsong United, Hillsong Music & Resources / Sparrow Records
- **Tauren Wells, Provident Music Group**
- TobyMac, Forefront / Capitol CMG
- Zach Williams, Provident Label Group

Southern Gospel Artist of the Year

- Ernie Haase & Signature Sound, Gaither Music
- Gaither Vocal Band, Gaither Music
- Jason Crabb, Red Street Records
- **Joseph Habedank, Daywind Records**
- Karen Peck & New River, Daywind Records

Gospel Artist of the Year

- Jekalyn Carr, Lunjeal Music Group
- Jonathan McReynolds, E1 Music
- Kirk Franklin, RCAI
- **Tasha Cobbs Leonard, Motown Gospel**
- Travis Greene, RCAI

Artist of the Year

- **For King & Country, Curb | Word**
- Hillsong Worship, Hillsong Music & Resources/ Sparrow Records
- Lauren Daigle, Centricity Music
- Tasha Cobbs Leonard, Motown Gospel
- Zach Williams, Provident Label Group

New Artist of the Year

- Chris Renzema, Centricity
- Cochren & Co., Gotee Records
- Elle Limebear, Provident
- Switch, Dream Records
- **We the Kingdom, Capitol CMG**

Producer of the Year

- Ben Isaacs
- **Ed Cash & Steven V. Taylor (Team)**
- Federico Vindver
- Jonathan Smith
- Jordan Sapp
- Justin Savage
- Michael Guy Chislett
- Shaun Martin, Maxwell Stark, Ronald Hill (Team)
- Wayne Haun

=== Rap/Hip Hop ===
Rap/Hip Hop Recorded Song of the Year

- "Keepin it movin am & guv demo.mp3" – Andy Mineo, Guvna B
  - (writers) Andrew Mineo, Ignacio Saucedo, Isaac Borquaye
- **"Follow God" – Kanye West**
  - **(writer) Kanye West**
- "Armies" – KB
  - (writers) Kevin Elijah Burgess, Wes Writer, Ed Cash, Scott McTyeire Cash, Chris Tomlin, Mashell Leroy
- "Set Me Free" – Lecrae
  - (writers) Lecrae Moore, Osiris Williams, Christopher Hulvey, Erica Atkins-Campbell, Gabriel Azucena, J Raul Garcia, Torey D'Shaun
- "Enough" – Social Club Misfits
  - (writers) Jordan Sapp, Kyle Williams, Martin Santiago, Fernando Miranda

Rap/Hip Hop Album of the Year

- Not By Chance – Aaron Cole
  - (producers) Cole Walowac, Chris King, Chino
- Work in Progress – Andy Mineo
  - (producers) Evan Ford, Joel McNeill of 42 North, Iggy Music, GAWVI, Matthew Scott Cohen, Nottz, !llmind
- Heathen – Gawvi
  - (producers) Gawvi, Jonathan Barahona, Tyshane Thompson, Garnell Watts, Matt Cohen, Jon Jon, Justin Barahona
- Jesus Is King – Kanye West
  - (producers) Kanye West, Federico Vindver, Budgie, E. Vax, BoogzDaBeast, Francis Starlite, Benny Blanco, Xcelence, Brian 'Allday', Angel Lopez, Timbaland, Michael Cerda, Pi'erre Bourne, Warryn Campbell, Labrinth, DrtWrk
- **MOOD // DOOM – Social Club Misfits**
  - **(producers) Chris Howland, Chris King, Daramola, Derek Minor, Desmond South, Evan Ford, Gavin George, Iggy Music, Jacob Cardec, Jimi Cravity, Jordan Sapp, Lasanna "Ace" Harris, Mashell Leroy, Sean Hamilton, Sean Minor, Shama "Sak Pase" Joseph, Steve "Pompano Puff" Tirogene, Tedashii Anderson, Tee Wyla, Zach Paradis**

=== Rock/Contemporary ===
Rock/Contemporary Recorded Song of the Year

- "More Than Bones" – Demon Hunter
  - (writers) Patrick Judge, Ryan Clark
- "Juggernaut" – John Mark McMillan
  - (writers) John Mark McMillan
- "My Arms" – Ledger
  - (writers) Jennifer Ledger, Colby Wedgeworth, Ethan Hulse
- "Royal Blood" - RICHLIN
  - (writers) Brandon Richardson, Zach Holmes
- **"Legendary" - Skillet**
  - **(writers) John L. Cooper, Korey Cooper, Seth Mosley**

Rock/Contemporary Album of the Year

- Out of Body – Apollo LTD
  - (producer) Ground Control
- Peace – Demon Hunter
  - (producer) Jeremiah Scott
- Love Letter Kill Shot – Disciple
  - (producer) Travis Wyrick
- Declaration – Red
  - (producers) Rob Graves
- **Victorious – Skillet**
  - **(producers) John L. Cooper, Korey Cooper, Kevin Churko, Seth Mosley, Mike "X" O'Connor**

=== Pop/Contemporary ===
Pop/Contemporary Recorded Song of the Year

- "Nobody" – Casting Crowns featuring Matthew West
  - (writers) Bernie Herms, Matthew West, Mark Hall
- "Burn the Ships" – For King & Country
  - (writers) Joel Smallbone, Luke Smallbone, Seth Mosley, Matt Hales
- "Dead Man Walking" - Jeremy Camp
  - (writers) Emily Weisband, Jeremy Camp, Jordan Sapp
- **"Rescue" – Lauren Daigle**
  - **(writers) Jason Ingram, Lauren Daigle, Paul Mabury**
- "Holy Water" - We the Kingdom
  - (writers) Andrew Bergthold, Ed Cash, Franni Cash, Martin Cash, Scott Cash

Pop/Contemporary Album of the Year

- The Story's Not Over – Jeremy Camp
  - (producer) Jeff Sojka, Jordan Sapp, Colby Wedgeworth, Ben Glover
- **Citizen of Heaven – Tauren Wells**
  - **(producers) Chuck Butler, Jordan Sapp, Kirk Franklin, Max Stark, Colby Wedgeworth, Rascal Flatts**
- Reason – Unspoken
  - (producers) Chris Stevens, Dave Clauss, Jeff Pardo, Tedd Tjornhom, David Spencer
- Live at the Wheelhouse – We the Kingdom
  - (producers) We the Kingdom
- Rescue Story – Zach Williams
  - (producers) Jonathan Smith

=== Inspirational ===
Inspirational Recorded Song of the Year

- "Now Is Forever" – Gaither Vocal Band
- (writers) Gloria Gaither, William J. Gaither, Gordon Mote
- "I Give Up" – Laura Story
  - (writer) Laura Story
- "His Mercy Is More" – Matt Boswell & Matt Papa
  - (writers) Matt Boswell, Matt Papa
- **"Yet Not I But Through Christ in Me" – Selah**
  - **(writers) Michael Farren, Rich Thompson, Jonny Robinson**
- "He Touched Me/There's Something About That Name/Because He Lives-Medley" – Steven Curtis Chapman
  - (writers) Gloria Gaither, William J. Gaither

Inspirational Album of the Year

- Don't Wanna Miss This – Cana's Voice
  - (producers) Wayne Haun, Jim Hammerley, Jerard Woods
- Faultlines Vol. II – Kalley
  - (producer) Jason Ingram
- I Give Up – Laura Story
  - (producers) Craig Swift, Chris Bevins
- His Mercy Is More: The Hymns of Matt Boswell and Matt Papa – Matt Boswell, Matt Papa, Keith & Kristyn Getty
  - (producers) Nathan Nockels
- **Firm Foundation – Selah**
  - **(producers) Brent Milligan, Chris Bevins, Jason Kyle Saetveit**

=== Southern Gospel ===
Southern Gospel Recorded Song of the Year

- "This Is the Place" – Gaither Vocal Band
  - (writers) Gloria Gaither, William J. Gaither, Gordon Mote
- "The God I Serve" – Karen Peck & New River
  - (writers) Rebecca Bowman, Sonya Yeary, Karen Peck Gooch, Jimmy Yeary
- "What Kind of Man" – Legacy Five
  - (writers) Kenna Turner West, Jason Cox, Sue Smith
- **"The Power of an Empty Tomb" – The Erwins**
  - **(writer) Joel Lindsey**
- "Can I Get A Witness" – The Sound
  - (writers) Kenna Turner West, Brent Baxter, Jason Cox

Southern Gospel Album of the Year

- Mercy & Love – Bill & Gloria Gaither and their Homecoming Friends
  - (producers) Bill Gaither, Kevin Williams
- That Day Is Coming Live – Collingsworth Family
  - (producer) Wayne Haun, Kim Collingsworth
- **Pure Love – Legacy Five**
  - **(producers) Scott Fowler, Wayne Haun, Trey Ivey**
- 20/20 – The Crabb Family
  - (producer) Dottie Leonard Miller, Jason Crabb, Scott Godsey
- The Crown – The McKameys
  - (producers) Jeff Collins, Roger Fortner

=== Bluegrass/Country/Roots ===
Bluegrass/Country/Roots Recorded Song of the Year

- "He Won't Let Go" - Gloria Gaynor, featuring Bart Millard
  - (writers) Gloria Gaynor, Andrew Ramsey, Shannon Sanders
- "Sometimes It's The Radio" – Joseph Habedank
  - (writers) Joseph Habedank, Tony Wood, Jimmy Yeary
- **"Ain't No Grave" – Karen Peck & New River**
  - **(writers) Jonathan David Helser, Melissa Helser and Molly Skaggs**
- "Elizabeth" – Keith & Kristyn Getty, Ellie Holcomb
  - (writers) Kristyn Getty, Ellie Holcomb
- "Amazing Grace" – The Oak Ridge Boys
  - (writer) John Newton

Bluegrass/Country/Roots Album of the Year

- Testimony – Gloria Gaynor
  - (producer) Chris Stevens, F. Reid Shippen
- You Are Loved – Jeff & Sheri Easter
  - (producers) Jeff Easter, Sheri Easter, Greg Cole
- **God & Country – Jimmy Fortune**
  - **(producers) Ben Isaacs**
- A Great Adventure, LIVE Solo Performances of Timeless Hits - Steven Curtis Chapman
  - (producers) Steven Curtis Chapman, Bill Gaither
- No Depression in Heaven: The Gospel Songs of the Carter Family - The Chuck Wagon Gang
  - (producers) David Johnson, Jeff Collins

=== Contemporary Gospel ===
Contemporary Gospel Recorded Song of the Year

- "Blessings On Blessings" – Anthony Brown & Group therAPy
  - (writer) Anthony Brown
- "Won't Be Moved" - Gene Moore
  - (writers) Bryan Sledge, Cedric Smith, Dameon Reeves
- **"People" – Jonathan McReynolds**
  - **(writer) Jonathan McReynolds**
- "B!g" – Pastor Mike Jr.
  - (writer) Michael McClure, Curtiss Glenn, Rodeny Turner
- "Won't Let Go" – Travis Greene
  - (writers) Travis Greene

Contemporary Gospel Album of the Year

- 2econd Wind: Ready – Anthony Brown & Group therAPy
  - (producers) Anthony Brown, Justin Savage
- TIME – Deitrick Haddon
  - (producers) Deitrick Haddon, Marcus Hodge
- People – Jonathan McReynolds
  - (producers) Jonathan McReynolds, Darryl "LiLMaN" Howell, Rogest "Rosco" Carstarphen Jr.
- KIERRA – Kierra Sheard
  - (producer) J. Drew Sheard II
- **Long Live Love – Kirk Franklin**
  - **(producers) Kirk Franklin, Shaun Martin, Maxwell Stark, Ronald Hill, S1 for SKP. Inc.**

=== Traditional Gospel ===
Traditional Gospel Recorded Song of the Year

- "Truly Amazing God" – John P. Kee
  - (writer) John P. Kee
- "It Keeps Happening" – Kierra Sheard
  - (writers) J. Drew Sheard, Kierra Valencia Sheard
- **"I'm All In" – Maranda Curtis**
  - **(writers) Asaph Ward, Dana Sorey, Maranda Curtis**
- "All in His Plan" – PJ Morton, featuring Mary Mary & Le'Andria Johnson
  - (writer) PJ Morton
- "Victory" – The Clark Sisters
  - (writer) J. Drew Sheard, Karen Clark-Sheard

Traditional Gospel Album of the Year

- A Different Song – Donnie McClurkin
  - (producers) Donnie McClurkin, Trent Phillips, Tre' Corley
- I Made It Out – John P. Kee
  - (producer) John P. Kee
- Bless Somebody Else – Kurt Carr
  - (producer) Kurt Carr
- Jesus Is Born – Sunday Service Choir
  - (producer) Kanye West, Jason White, Nikki Grier, Philip Cornish
- **The Return – The Clark Sisters**
  - **(producer) J. Drew Sheard II, Warryn Campbell, Eric Dawkins, Mano Hanes, Rodney Jerkins, Justin Brooks, Jermaine Dupri, Damien Sneed, Kurt Carr, Karen Clark-Sheard**

=== Gospel Worship ===
Gospel Worship Recorded Song of the Year

- "Miracle Worker" – JJ Hairston
  - (writer) Rich Tolbert Jr.
- **"Something Has To Break (Live)" – Kierra Sheard, featuring Tasha Cobbs Leonard**
  - **(writers) J. Drew Sheard, Kierra Valencia Sheard, Mia Fieldes, Jonathan Smith**
- "Promises" – Maverick City Music
  - (writers) Aaron Moses, Lemuel Marin, Carrington Gaines, Dante Bowe, Joe L. Barnes, Keila Alvarado
- "Proverbs 3" – Todd Dulaney
  - (writers) Todd Dulaney, Jaylen Moore, Isaac Tarver
- "Only You Can Satisfy (Live)" – William McDowell, Chris Lawson
  - (writers) William McDowell, Chandler Moore

Gospel Worship Album of the Year

- Miracle Worker – JJ Hairston
  - JJ Hairston
- Maverick City Vol. 3 Part 1 – Maverick City Music
  - (producers) Tony Brown, Jonathan Jay
- **Broken Record – Travis Greene**
  - **(producers) Travis Greene, Brunes Charles**
- Elements – VaShawn Mitchell
  - (producers) VaShawn Mitchell, Thomas Hardin Jr.
- The Cry – William McDowell
  - (producers) William McDowell, Clay Bogan III

=== Spanish Language ===
Spanish Language Recorded Song of the Year

- **"Loco Amor" – Christine D'Clario**
  - **(writer) Chris McClarney, Jacob Sooter, Ricky Jackson**
- "Solo Dios Sabe (God Only Knows)" – For King & Country, featuring Miel San Marcos
  - (writers) Joel Smallbone, Jordan Reynolds, Josh Kerr, Luke Smallbone, Tedd Tjornhom
- "Santo río de Dios" – Marcos Witt
  - (writer) Jonathan Mark Witt
- "Way Maker" – Priscilla Bueno
  - (writer) Osinachi Okoro
- "Filipenses 1:6 (ft. Almighty)" – Redimi2
  - (writers) Alejandro Mosqueda, Willy González

Spanish Language Album of the Year

- Soldados – Alex Campos
  - (producers) Alex Campos, Javier Serrano, Juan Botello, Madiel Lara, Andres Castro, Saga WhiteBlack, Ceferino Caban
- Shekinah (Live) – Barak
  - (producers) Angelo Frilop, Janiel Ponciano
- **Aleluya (En La Tierra) – Elevation Worship**
  - **(producers) Chris Brown, Steven Furtick**
- Origen y Esencia – Jesus Adrian Romero
  - (producer) Kiko Cibrian
- Sinergia – Un Corazón y LEAD
  - (producer) Otho Castro

=== Worship ===
Worship Recorded Song of the Year

- "King Of Kings (Live at Qudos Bank Arena, Sydney, AU/2019)" – Hillsong Worship
  - (writers) Brooke Ligertwood, Scot Ligertwood, Jason Ingram
- "Goodness of God" – Jenn Johnson
  - (writers) Ben Fielding, Brian Johnson, Jenn Johnson, Ed Cash, Jason Ingram
- **"The Blessing (Live)" – Kari Jobe, Cody Carnes, Elevation Worship**
  - **(writers) Kari Jobe Carnes, Cody Carnes, Chris Brown, Steven Furtick**
- "Way Maker" – Leeland
  - (writer) Osinach Okoro
- "Great Things" – Phil Wickham
  - (writers) Phil Wickham, Jonas Myrin

Worship Album of the Year

- Peace – Bethel Music
  - (producer) Ed Cash, Jeff Schneeweis, Steven V. Taylor
- At Midnight – Elevation Worship
  - (producers) Aaron Robertson, Steven Furtick
- People (Deluxe/Live in Sydney, Australia) – Hillsong United
  - (producer) Michael Guy Chislett, Joel Houston
- **Awake – Hillsong Worship**
  - **(producers) Michael Guy Chislett, Brooke Ligertwood, Ben Tan, Ben Tennikoff**
- Alive & Breathing – Matt Maher
  - (producers) Matt Maher, Mitch Parks

=== Other categories ===
Instrumental Album of the Year

- Tune My Heart...Songs of Rest & Reflection – Andrew Greer & Friends
  - (producers) Andrew Greer, Travis Patton, Kyle Buchanan
- Without Words: Genesis – Bethel Music
  - (producers) Seth Mosley, Michael "X" O'Connor, Lael
- **Untitled Hymn: A Collection of Hymns (Instrumental) – Chris Rice**
  - **(producers) Chris Rice, Ken Lewis**
- Ambientes de Adoracion – Miel San Marcos
  - (producers) Josh Morales, Luis Morales Jr., Chris Rocha, Samy Morales, Juan Velásquez
- Instrumental Songs Of Worship – The Maker & The Instrument
  - (producer) Tommee Profitt

Children's Album of the Year

- **Sing: Remembering Songs – Ellie Holcomb**
  - **(producers) Nate Dugger, Brown Bannister**
- Songs Of Some Silliness – Hillsong Kids, Funny Man Dan
  - (producer) David Wakerley
- Getty Kids Hymnal - Family Carol Sing – Keith & Kristyn Getty
  - (producers) Fionán de Barra, Jonathan Rea, Keith & Kristyn Getty
- Babies (Musica para bebes) – Miel San Marcos
  - (producers) Josh Morales, Luis Morales Jr., Samy Morales, Jorge Privado
- Sparkle. Pop. Rampage. – Rend Co. Kids, Rend Collective
  - (producers) Gareth Gilkeson, Chris Llewellyn

Christmas / Special Event Album of the Year

- Behold the Lamb of God (15th Anniversary) – Andrew Peterson
  - (producer) Ben Shive
- A True Family Christmas – Collingsworth Family
  - (producer) Bradley Knight
- The Greatest Gift: A Christmas Collection – Danny Gokey
  - (producers) Hank Bentley, Colby Wedgeworth, Ben Glover, Jeff Pardo, Bernie Herms
- **Christmas – Phil Wickham**
  - **(producer) Jonathan Smith**
- What Christmas Really Means – The Erwins
  - (producers) Wayne Haun, Trey Ivey

Musical of the Year

- An Unexpected Christmas
  - (creators) Daniel Semsen, Joel Lindsey, Jeff Bumgardner, Heidi Petak, (arranger/orchestrator) Daniel Semsen
- Is He Worthy
  - (creators) Russell Mauldin, Sue C. Smith
- **Messiah Overcame – An Easter Musical**
  - **(creators) Mike Harland, John Rowsey, (Arrangers/Orchestrators) Cliff Duren, Jim Hammerly, Christopher Phillips, Phil Nitz**
- Song of Joy
  - (creator) Dale Mathews, (arranger/orchestrator) Marty Hamby
- The Song of Bethlehem
  - (creator) Lee Black, (arrangers/orchestrators) Cliff Duren, Phillip Keveren, Phil Nitz

Youth / Children's Musical of the Year

- Back to the Beginning
  - (creator) Christy Semsen, (arranger) Daniel Semsen
- Do Not Be Afraid Parade
  - (creators) Nick Robertson, Anna Lampe, (arranger) Nick Robertson
- **Good News Ahead...The Signs of Christmas!**
  - **(creators) Gina Boe, Barb Dorn**
- The Joy of Christmas
  - (creators) Terryl Padilla, John Roberts
- The Little Drummer Dude'
  - (creator) Christy Semsen, (arranger) Daniel Semsen

Choral Collection of the Year

- Our Faithful God
  - (creators) Mike Harland, Chris Machen, Diane Machen, (arranger/orchestrator) Cliff Duren
- Southern Gospel Sounds
  - (arranger/orchestrator) Marty Hamby
- Spirit Rise
  - (arranger) Travis Cottrell
- Sunday Southern Favorites
  - (creator/arranger) Marty Hamby
- **Top Anthem Collection**
  - **(creator) Johnathan Crumpton, (arrangers) Bradley Knight, Cliff Duren, Mike Speck, Marty Parks, Daniel Semsen, Gary Rhodes, Dave Williamson, Geron Davis, Tom Fettke, Russell Mauldin**

Recorded Music Packaging of the Year

- Behold the Lamb of God (15th Anniversary) – Andrew Peterson
  - (art directors) Joshua Wurzelbacher, Stephen Crotts, (photographers) Bob Boyd, Alicia St. Gelais, Keely Scott, Jenna Morris
- Choose to Worship – Rend Collective
  - (art director/graphic designer) Drew Kellum, (photographer) Jude Thompson
- Forever Amen – Steffany Gretzinger
  - (art director) Tim Parker, (graphic artist) Tim Parker, (photographer) Sean Frizzell
- Let There Be Wonder – Matt Redman
  - (art director) Jason B. Jones, (designers) Jordan Rubino, OneSixOne, (photography) Lee Steffen, (Illustrator) Micaela Alcaino
- Perspectives – David Dunn
  - (art director) Ryan Clark
- **Rescue Story – Zach Williams**
  - **(art director/graphic artist) Tim Parker, (photographer) Eric Brown**

=== Videos and films ===
Short Form Video of the Year

- Citizen of Heaven – Tauren Wells
  - (director) Matt DeLisi, (producer) Ryan Atenhan
- **"God Only Knows – For King & Country, featuring Dolly Parton**
  - **(directors/producers) Ben Smallbone, Patrick Tohill**
- Reason – Unspoken
  - (director) Max Hsu, Nathan Schneider, (producers) Joshua Wurzelbacher, Alicia St. Gelais
- Trilogy – Silent Planet
  - (director/producer) Kevin Johnson
- Wanted – Danny Gokey
  - (director) Elliott Eicheldinger, (producer) Loren Hughes

Long Form Video of the Year

- A Great Adventure, LIVE Solo Performances of Timeless Hits – Steven Curtis Chapman
  - (director/producer) Doug Stuckey
- **Awake (Live) – Hillsong Worship**
  - **(directors) Richard Cause, Jared Chapman, Paul Martin, Samuel Irving, Steven Lester, (producers) Johnny Rays, Jessica Ico, Steven Lester**
- The Wait (Movie) – David Leonard
  - (director) Elliot Eicheldinger, (producers) The Creak Music, Integrity Music
- Building a Christmas to Remember – The Singing Contractors
  - (directors/producers) Michael Sykes, Joel Key, Doug Stuckey
- People (Visual Album) – Jonathan McReynolds
  - (director) Austin Peckham
- Roar (Live) – Passion
  - (director) Steven Lester, (producers) Shelley Giglio, Rachel Baldwin, Leighton Ching, Matt Reed

Inspirational Film of the Year

- A Beautiful Day in the Neighborhood
  - (director) Marielle Heller, (producers) Youree Henley, Leah Holzer, Peter Saraf, Wenxin She, Marc Turtletaub
- Bethany Hamilton: Unstoppable
  - (director) Aaron Lieber, (producers) Penny Edmiston, Jane Kelly Kosek, Aaron Lieber
- **I Still Believe**
  - **(director) Andrew Erwin, Jon Erwin, (producers) Kevin Downes, Andrew Erwin, Jon Erwin**
- Overcomer
  - (director) Alex Kendrick, (producers) Stephen Kendrick, Aaron Burns, Justin Tolley
- The Clark Sisters: First Ladies of Gospel
  - (directors) Christine Swanson, (producers) Ronnie J. Pitre, Steve Solomos
