= Victory (Bethel Music album) =

Live album by Bethel Music
- Released: January 25, 2019
- Recorded: 2018
- Venues: Bethel Church, Redding, California, U.S.
- Genres: Contemporary worship music; Christian country
- Length: 65:55
- Label: Bethel Music
- Producer: Ed Cash

Bethel Music chronology
Moments: Mighty Sound (2018)	Victory (2019)	Bethel Music en Español (2019)

Singles from Victory
- 1. "Stand in Your Love" Released: August 10, 2018; 2. "Raise a Hallelujah" Released: March 8, 2019; 3. "Goodness of God" Released: November 1, 2019

Victory (stylized in capital letters) is the eleventh live album by California-based worship collective Bethel Music, and their sixteenth full-length release overall. The album was released on through the collective's imprint label, Bethel Music, on January 25, 2019. The album is inspired by the biblical account of King Jehoshaphat's victory over the Moabite alliance in war by sending out a group of worshipers as a vanguard for his army. The featured worship leaders on the album are Josh Baldwin, Cory Asbury, Jonathan David & Melissa Helser, Bethany Wohrle, Sean Feucht, Emmy Rose, Brian Johnson, Jenn Johnson, Kalley Heiligenthal, Paul McClure, Hannah McClure and Hunter G K Thompson with Molly Skaggs, Daniel Bashta and Harvest as guests. Ed Cash handled the production of the album.

The album was preceded by the release of "Stand in Your Love" as a single on August 10, 2018. Following the album's release, "Raise a Hallelujah" became the second single with its release on March 8, 2019. To promote the album, the collective embarked on the Victory Tour, which began on February 4, 2019, at The Fillmore in Miami, Florida, and concluded on October 16, 2019, at the Ovens Auditorium in Charlotte, North Carolina. "Goodness of God" became the third single from the album on November 1, 2019.

Garnering critical acclaim for its production and the variety of musical genres, the album also became a commercial success with debuts on mainstream charts in the United States, Australia, Canada, the Netherlands, Scotland and Switzerland, with the album concurrently appearing at No. 2 and No. 1 on the American and British Christian charts respectively.

== Background ==
Victory marks Bethel Music first collection of new songs in two years, that is, since the release of Starlight in April 2017. The album was written, recorded and produced in 2018, which proved to be an tumultuous year for the Bethel Church community, as Jaxon Taylor (son of Bethel Music CEO Joel Taylor) was in a life-threatening health situation having contracted Hemolytic-uremic syndrome, and the near-month-long devastating Carr Fire, a wildfire which had made its way to Redding.

The album was inspired by the biblical account of King Jehoshaphat's war with the Moabite alliance, recorded in 2 Chronicles 20:1-30. The alliance, which consisted of the kingdoms of Moab, Ammon and some of the Meunites), waged war against the Kingdom of Judah, which was under Jehoshaphat's reign. Jehoshaphat decided to inquire from God and proclaimed a fast in his kingdom and reassurance from Jahaziel, who delivered a prophetic word that God would fight their battles. Having consulted some people, Jehoshaphat appointed men to go, praising God, at the head of the army, and God delivered the victory to Judah.

== Music and lyrics ==
The album, like previous Bethel Music releases, is primarily a contemporary worship album, which contains various genres such acoustic, Americana, country, and folk music. The sound on the album has drawn comparisons to Rend Collective, especially on songs such as "Drenched in Love", "Stand in Your Love", and "There Is a Name". Lyrically, the album explores the theme of triumph and faithfulness.

== Artwork ==
Stephen James Hart, the art director and visual worship leader for Bethel Music, shared on his blog the story of the album artwork for Victory. The artwork is a literal representation of the stories of the songs on the album being captured in the "ideal newspaper"; each issue detailing the stories of God and his goodness through the stories, testimonies, lyrics and photos.

== Release and promotion ==
On December 10, 2018, Hallels reported that Bethel Music would be releasing Victory on January 25, 2019. On January 4, 2019, Bethel Music commenced the album pre-order for Victory, availing "Raise a Hallelujah", "Goodness of God", "Ain't No Grave" and "Victory Is Yours" as promotional singles that were available for digital download and streaming. Bethel Music then released the live music videos of the songs in their respective order, recorded at Bethel Church, on the four days that followed the pre-order, releasing each song per day. The complete album was released on January 25, 2019.

== Singles ==
Fox News first reported in an article that "Stand in Your Love" will be released by Josh Baldwin in July 2018. On 19 July 2018, Bethel Music then released the live music video of the song, recorded Heaven Come Conference 2018, on YouTube. Bethel Music then released a studio rendition of "Stand in Your Love" on August 10, 2018.

On March 8, 2019, "Raise a Hallelujah" was released as the album's second single.

On November 1, 2019, "Goodness of God" was released digitally as the album's third single.

== Tour ==
In October 2018, Bethel Music announced on Twitter that they would be headlining the Victory Tour in 2019, with three tour legs in February, April and October. It was later revealed that Tasha Cobbs Leonard and Housefires would also be joining the collective on the Victory Tour. The tour began on February 4, 2019, with a sold-out show at The Fillmore in Miami, Florida, less than two weeks after the album was released. Bethel Music indicated on the tour's webpage that Phil Wickham will join the October leg of the tour. The tour set to end on October 16, 2019, at the Ovens Auditorium in Charlotte, North Carolina.

== Reception ==
=== Critical response ===
Professional ratings
Review scores
Source	Rating
365 Days of Inspiring Media	4/5
CCM Magazine	4.5/5 stars
Cross Rhythms	9/10 squares
Hallels	4/5
Louder Than the Music	4/5 stars

Victory was critically acclaimed upon its release, notably for the diversity in style, lyrical content and production. James Christopher Monger of AllMusic described the album as "a galvanizing set of songs," and that it features "stirring pieces." Jonathan Andre opined in his 365 Days of Inspiring Media review that Bethel Music "are a force in the worship music industry to be reckoned with, and Victory continues with that assertion." CCM Magazine's Andrew Greenlagh said that Victory was "worship music at its finest" and that it is one of Bethel's strongest releases to date. Jono Davies, reviewing for Louder Than the Music, also echoed the sentiment that Victory is a strong album. In a positive review for Eden.co.uk, Laura White noted that the album is "hope-filled and faith-empowering but it’s authentic praise."

Rating the album nine out of ten squares for in a positive review for Cross Rhythms, Tony Cummings said the commented that "Like King Jehosophat, they have seized a victory by sending worshippers to the frontline of battle." Timothy Yap, bestowing the album a four-out-of-five score in a Hallels Review, complimented that the sound is "impeccable," but complained that the songs "can also be a tad formulaic." In a favorable review by Luchae William of Gateway News, having "thoroughly enjoyed" the album, commended its musical production, and said it was "one of the better Bethel worship releases that has crossed my desk in a while." Jasmin Patterson praised the album in a NewReleaseToday review, concluding that "is a collection of songs that will bring you into an encounter with God, empower you to sing His promises over your circumstances, and give you a variety of musical styles to enjoy while you do it."

=== Accolades ===
Awards and nominations
Year	Organization	Award	Result	Ref.
2019	GMA Dove Awards	Worship Album of the Year	Nominated	
2020	Billboard Music Awards	Top Christian Album	Nominated	

Year-end lists
Publication	Accolade	Rank	Ref.
365 Days of Inspiring Media	Top 50 Albums of 2019	33	
NewReleaseToday	Top 10 Worship Albums of 2019	4	

== Commercial performance ==
In the United States, Victory launched at No. 2 on the U.S. Billboard Christian Albums chart dated February 9, 2019. The album was also landed at No. 2 on the Independent Albums chart, registered as the fourth best-selling digital album, and debuted on the mainstream Billboard 200 chart at No. 56 that same week, as well as the Canadian Albums Chart at No. 77.

Victory charted at No. 23 on the ARIA Top 100 Albums Chart in Australia. The album also launched in the Netherlands on the Album Top 100 at No. 162. In the United Kingdom, it launched at No. 1 on the Official Christian & Gospel Albums Chart published by the Official Charts Company, while registering on the Official Scottish Albums at No. 41. In Switzerland, Victory made its debut at No. 19 on the Swiss Hitparade Albums Chart.

== Track listing ==
Victory
No.	Title	Writer(s)	Worship leader(s)	Length
1.	"Raise a Hallelujah"	Jonathan David Helser; Melissa Helser; Molly Skaggs; Jake Stevens	Jonathan David Helser; Melissa Helser	7:50
2.	"Goodness of God"	Ed Cash; Ben Fielding; Jason Ingram; Brian Johnson; Jenn Johnson	Jenn Johnson	4:56
3.	"Ain't No Grave"	J. D. Helser; M. Helser; Skaggs; Claude Ely	Molly Skaggs	8:13
4.	"Stand in Your Love"	Josh Baldwin; Mark Harris; Ethan Hulse; Rita Springer	Josh Baldwin	4:08
5.	"Victory Is Yours"	Matt Crocker; Fielding; B. Johnson; Reuben Morgan	Bethany Wohrle	5:33
6.	"There Is a Name"	Pat Barrett; Sean Feucht; Ben Hastings	Sean Feucht	4:31
7.	"Promises Never Fail"	Fielding; Ingram; B. Johnson; Joel Taylor	Emmy Rose	4:57
8.	"Praise Is the Highway"	Feucht; Fielding; B. Johnson; Chris Tomlin	Brian Johnson	4:52
9.	"Drenched in Love"	Matt Armstrong; Daniel Bashta; Joshua Silverberg	Daniel Bashta; Harvest	5:58
10.	"Every Crown"	Cash; Chris Davenport; Kalley Heiligenthal; Ingram	Kalley Heiligenthal	4:39
11.	"How Great a King"	Matt Hammitt; Hannah McClure; Paul McClure; Seth Mosley	Paul McClure; Hannah McClure	5:16
12.	"Christ Is Risen"	Mack Brock; B. Johnson; Phil Wickham	Hunter G K Thompson	4:37
13.	"Living Hope"	B. Johnson; Wickham	Brian Johnson; Jenn Johnson	5:04
14.	"Endless Alleluia"	Cory Asbury; Ran Jackson; Ricky Jackson; B. Johnson	Cory Asbury	5:23
Total length:				65:55

Sample credits

- "Ain't No Grave" contains an interpolation of the song, "Ain't No Grave" written by Claude Ely.
- "Drenched in Love" contains an interpolation of the traditional hymn, "Nothing But the Blood".

== Personnel ==
Adapted from AllMusic.

- Eric Allen – artist direction, director
- Jacob Arnold – drums
- Cory Asbury – vocals
- Josh Baldwin – vocals
- Daniel Bashta – vocals
- Andrew Bergthold – background vocals, keyboards, pre-production, programming
- Jordan Borgart – creative director
- Kyle Briskin – background vocals
- Robby Busick – production manager
- Ed Cash – acoustic guitar, background vocals, electric guitar, keyboards, mandolin, mixing, producer, programming
- Franni Cash – background vocals
- Martin Cash – background vocals, drum programming, percussion
- Scott Cash – acoustic guitar, background vocals, electric guitar
- Chris Estes – director
- Alton Eugene – choir/chorus
- Sean Feucht – vocals
- Samantha Fischer – choir/chorus
- John-Paul Gentile – baritone, drum programming, hammer dulcimer, hi string guitar, percussion
- Maria Githuku – choir/chorus
- Rachel Soh – photography
- Jordana Griffith – photography
- Stephen James Hart – art direction and design
- Kalley Heiligenthal – vocals
- Jonathan David Helser – vocals
- Melissa Helser – vocals
- Luke Hendrickson – keyboards, programming
- David Hislop – electric guitar
- Jenny Hislop – production manager
- Ryan Huntington – editing
- Brian Johnson – executive producer, vocals
- Jenn Johnson – executive producer, vocals
- Joe LaPorta – mastering
- Jonathan Lee – electric guitar
- Ebonee Marrow – choir/chorus
- Hannah McClure – vocals
- Paul McClure – vocals
- Mat Ogden – bass guitar
- Michael Pope – electric guitar
- Edward Rivera – choir/chorus
- Emmy Rose – vocals
- Justin Schipper – steel guitar
- Molly Skaggs – vocals
- Rachel Soh – photography
- Nick Stailey – keyboards, programming
- Kelcey Swanstrum – choir/chorus
- Joel Taylor – executive producer
- Hunter Thompson – vocals
- David Whitworth – drums
- Bethany Wohrle – vocals

== Charts ==
=== Weekly charts ===
Chart (2019)	Peak position
Australian Albums (ARIA)	23
Canadian Albums (Billboard)	77
Dutch Albums (Album Top 100)	162
Scottish Albums (Official Charts)	41
Swiss Albums (Schweizer Hitparade)	19
UK Christian & Gospel Albums (OCC)	1
US Billboard 200	56
US Top Christian Albums (Billboard)	2
US Independent Albums (Billboard)	2

=== Year-end charts ===
Chart (2019)	Position
US Christian Albums (Billboard)	14
Chart (2020)	Position
US Christian Albums (Billboard)	16
Chart (2021)	Position
US Christian Albums (Billboard)	19
Chart (2022)	Position
US Christian Albums (Billboard)	21
Chart (2023)	Position
US Christian Albums (Billboard)	23
Chart (2025)	Position
US Christian Albums (Billboard)	30

== Release history ==
Region	Date	Format(s)	Label(s)	Ref.
Various	January 25, 2019	CD; digital download; streaming	Bethel Music	
