= Bethel Music en Español =

Studio album by Bethel Music
- Released: February 15, 2019
- Recorded: 2018
- Genre: Worship; Latin Christian music
- Length: 76:50
- Language: Spanish
- Label: Bethel Music
- Producer: Jose Olide; Paul Pineda

Bethel Music chronology
Victory (2019)	Bethel Music en Español (2019)	Without Words: Genesis (2019)

Bethel Music en Español is the first album in Spanish by California-based worship collective Bethel Music, and their seventeenth album overall. The album was released on February 15, 2019, through its own imprint label, Bethel Music. The featured Bethel Music worship leaders on the album are Josh Baldwin, Cory Asbury, Jonathan David & Melissa Helser, Bethany Wohrle, Brian Johnson, Jenn Johnson, Kalley Heiligenthal, Paul McClure, Hunter G K Thompson and Steffany Gretzinger with guest appearances from Christine D'Clario, Edward Rivera, Raquel Vega and Marco Barrientos. Jose Olide and Paul Pineda handled the production of the album.

== Background ==
Bethel Music en Español is the first album by Bethel Music to be recorded in Spanish as well as the first album by the collective to be recorded in a language other than English. The album is a collection of previously released Bethel Music songs.

== Artwork ==
Stephen James Hart, the Art Director and Visual Worship Leader for Bethel Music, shared on his blog the story of the album artwork for Bethel Music en Español. The final album cover is a photograph of Melissa Helser leading worship live with the type encased in boxes alluding to the cover design era of the 1990s and 2000s. The concept captures the legacy of revival and worship in Latin America as well as the essence of Bethel Music's worship, which is "the Spirit of God flowing through our offering of surrender, all centred around Jesus and the cross."

== Release and promotion ==
Bethel Music began teasing the album on social media in September 2018. A short video cip titled Bethel Music en Español which shows Steffany Gretzinger singing the song "Pieces" in Spanish was published on Bethel Music's YouTube channel. An Instagram account with the same name was launched, with images of Spanish titles for previously released Bethel Music songs and additional video teasers being uploaded there. On February 1, 2019, Bethel Music launched the album pre-order with the release of three promotional singles: "Por Siempre" featuring Kalley Heiligenthal; "Promesas No Fallarán" featuring Christine D'Clario; and "Mi Esperanza Está en Jesús" featuring Bethany Wohrle. The album was slated for release on February 15, 2019.

== Critical reception ==
Professional ratings
Review scores
Source	Rating
365 Days Of Inspiring Media	4.5/5 stars

Reviewing for 365 Days of Inspiring Media, Jonathan Andre rated Bethel Music en Español four and a half stars out of five, stating that the album will be enjoy by its Spanish speaking community and fans of Bethel's previous release, and described it as "a unique representation of what worship music could sound like if sung by someone else in another country."

== Commercial performance ==
In the United States, Bethel Music en Español debuted at No. 16 on the Latin Pop Albums chart dated March 2, 2019 published by Billboard.

== Track listing ==
NOTE: These songs are Spanish-language translations of Bethel Music songs in English. The original English-language song is listed next to each title.

Bethel Music en Español
No.	Title	Writer(s)	Length
1.	"Sé Entronado (Be Enthroned)" (featuring Hunter G.K. Thompson)	Kalley Heiligenthal; Brian Johnson; Jeremy Riddle; Hunter Thompson	7:45
2.	"Por Siempre (Ever Be)" (featuring Kalley Heiligenthal)	Chris Greely; Heiligenthal; Bobby Strand; Gabriel Wilson	5:20
3.	"Promesas No Fallarán (Promises Never Fail)" (featuring Christine D'Clario)	Ben Fielding; Jason Ingram; B. Johnson; Joel Taylor	5:05
4.	"En Ti Estoy Firme (Stand in Your Love)" (featuring Edward Rivera)	Josh Baldwin; Mark Harris; Ethan Hulse; Rita Springer	3:41
5.	"Mi Esperanza Está en Jesús (Living Hope)" (featuring Bethany Wohrle)	B. Johnson; Wickham	4:51
6.	"Adorar Sin Cesar (Endlessly)" (featuring Josh Baldwin & Edward Rivera)	Baldwin; Tom Crandall; B. Strand; Joe Volk	4:29
7.	"Entrego Todo (Have It All)" (featuring Brian Johnson & Edward Rivera)	Mia Fieldes; B. Johnson; B. Strand; Lindsey Strand; Taylor	6:23
8.	"Jesús Te Amamos (Jesus We Love You)" (featuring Paul McClure)	Heiligenthal; Hannah McClure; Paul McClure	5:16
9.	"Ten Fe Corazón (Take Courage)" (featuring Kristene DiMarco & Raquel Vega)	Kristene DiMarco; Riddle; Taylor	5:12
10.	"Incontrolable Amor (Reckless Love)" (featuring Cory Asbury & Edward Rivera)	Cory Asbury; Caleb Culver; Ran Jackson	5:31
11.	"Sopla Espíritu (Spirit Move)" (featuring Kalley Heiligenthal)	Amanda Cook; Heiligenthal; B. Johnson	5:01
12.	"Ya No Soy Esclavo (No Longer Slaves)" (featuring Jonathan David Helser & Melissa Helser)	Joel Case; Jonathan David Helser; B. Johnson	5:50
13.	"Padre Nuestro (Our Father)" (featuring Jenn Johnson & Marco Barrientos)	Marcus Meier	6:54
14.	"Partes (Pieces)" (featuring Steffany Gretzinger)	Cook; Steffany Gretzinger	5:32
Total length:			76:50

== Personnel ==
Adapted from AllMusic.

- Eric Allen — artist direction, director
- Keila Alvarado — background vocals
- Cory Asbury — primary artist, vocals
- Josh Baldwin — primary artist, vocals
- Marco Barrientos — featured artist, vocals
- Robby Busick ——production manager
- Joe Creppell — mastering
- Christine D'Clario — adaptation, executive producer, primary artist, vocals
- Kristene DiMarco — primary Artist, vocals
- Chris Estes — director
- Chris Greely — programming, string arrangements, synthesizer arrangements
- Steffany Gretzinger — primary artist, vocals
- Stephen Hart — art direction, design
- Kalley Heiligenthal — primary artist, vocals
- Jonathan David Helser — primary artist, vocals
- Melissa Helser — primary artist, vocals
- Luke Hendrickson — piano
- Jenny Hislop — production manager
- Hannah Holland — background vocals
- Brian Johnson — executive producer, primary artist, vocals
- Jenn Johnson — primary artist, vocals
- Lemuel Marín — adaptation, piano
- Paul McClure — primary artist, vocals
- Mathew Ogden — bass
- José Olide — adaptation, creative director, drums, executive producer, producer
- Paul Piñeda — producer
- Michael Pope — guitar
- Justin Posey — cover photo
- Edward Rivera — adaptation, background vocals, featured artist, primary artist, vocals
- Bobby Strand — programming, string arrangements, synthesizer arrangements
- Joel Taylor — executive producer
- Dafydd Thomas — mixing
- Hunter Thompson primary artist, vocals
- Raquel Vega — featured artist, vocals
- Joe Volk — drums
- Bethany Wohrle — primary artist, vocals

== Charts ==
Chart (2019)	Peak position
US Latin Pop Albums (Billboard)	16

== Release history ==
Region	Date	Format(s)	Label(s)	Ref.
Various	February 15, 2019	CD; digital download; streaming	Bethel Music	
