= Peace (Bethel Music album) =

Studio album by Bethel Music
- Released: April 10, 2020
- Recorded: 2020
- Genre: Contemporary worship music
- Length: 68:45
- Label: Bethel Music
- Producer: Ed Cash; Steven Taylor

Bethel Music studio album chronology
Tides (2013)	Peace (2020)	Homecoming (Español) (2021)

Bethel Music chronology
Without Words: Genesis (2019)	Peace (2020)	Revival's in the Air (2020)

Peace is the second studio album by Bethel Music, and their nineteenth full-length overall. It was released on April 10, 2020, through its own imprint label, Bethel Music. The featured worship leaders on the album are Cory Asbury, Jonathan David & Melissa Helser, Josh Baldwin, Amanda Lindsey Cook, Brian Johnson, Jenn Johnson, with Kari Jobe and We The Kingdom appearing as guests. Ed Cash collaborated with and Steven Taylor in the production of the album.

== Background ==
On April 9, 2020, Bethel Music announced that they will be releasing Peace at midnight of April 10 via social media. The album is the collective's second studio project since Tides (2013). The album is a collection of remixed versions of nine renowned worship songs and three original songs. The remixed songs included hits from the Bethel Music community such as "Reckless Love", "Goodness of God" and "Raise a Hallelujah" as well as popular songs by other contemporary worship artists such as Upperroom's "Surrounded (Fight My Battles)" and Elevation Worship's "The Blessing".

== Recording, production ==
Ed Cash, spoke about the process of recording the album and the main aim of the record, saying:

The recordings on this album use cutting edge techniques scientifically proven to help heal parts of the brain damaged by all kinds of emotional trauma-like anxiety, depression, abuse, divorce and grief-by engaging both sides of the brain through the gentle panning of peaceful soundscapes known as bilateral music. As you listen, breathe slow and deep and enjoy the healing, peaceful effects of these powerful biblical truths proclaimed over your life.

== Reception ==
=== Critical response ===
Professional ratings
Review scores
Source	Rating
365 Days of Inspiring Media	4.5/5
Hallels	5/5 stars

Joshua Andre in his 365 Days of Inspiring Media review described Peace as a "very layered and unique album," further commenting that it is "a brilliant album for a well-respected church and group!" Hallel's Timothy Yap gave a favourable review of the album, declaring that Peace lives up to its title and the collection of songs are "carefully curated, crafted and projected so that they function to bring us to worship God with a surrendered posture. And as a much-added bonus these songs are performed by a red carpet list of some of the best worship leaders."

=== Accolades ===
Awards
Year	Organization	Award	Result	Ref
2020	GMA Dove Awards	Worship Album of the Year	Nominated	
2021	Billboard Music Awards	Top Christian Album	Nominated	

== Commercial performance ==
In the United States, Peace launched at No. 85 on the mainstream Billboard 200 chart dated April 25, 2020, concurrently registering at No. 2 on Christian Albums chart, having earned 9,000 equivalent album units in the first week of sales. In the United Kingdom, Peace debuted at No. 3 on OCC's Official Christian & Gospel Albums Chart dated April 24, 2020.

== Track listing ==
Peace
No.	Title	Writer(s)	Length
1.	"Surrounded (Fight My Battles)" (with Kari Jobe)	Elyssa Smith	5:01
2.	"Raise a Hallelujah" (with Jonathan David Helser & Melissa Helser)	Jonathan David Helser; Melissa Helser; Molly Skaggs; Jake Stevens	6:13
3.	"Goodness of God" (with Jenn Johnson)	Ed Cash; Ben Fielding; Jason Ingram; Brian Johnson; Jenn Johnson	7:35
4.	"Dancing on the Waves" (with We The Kingdom)	E. Cash; Scott Cash; Franni Cash; Andrew Bergthold; Martin Cash; Kyle Briskin	2:12
5.	"By the Grace of God" (with Brian Johnson)	Martin Smith; Tim Hughes; Nick Herbert; B. Johnson; Kristene DiMarco	5:17
6.	"Reckless Love" (with Cory Asbury)	Cory Asbury; Caleb Culver; Ran Jackson	4:22
7.	"King of My Heart" (with Amanda Lindsey Cook)	John Mark McMillan; Sarah McMillan	5:29
8.	"I'll Be Everything" (with Jenn Johnson)	J. Johnson; Jeff Schneeweis	4:55
9.	"Stand in Your Love" (with Josh Baldwin)	Ethan Hulse; Josh Baldwin; Mark Harris; Rita Springer	4:28
10.	"No Longer Slaves" (with Jonathan David Helser & Melissa Helser)	J. D. Helser; Joel Case; B. Johnson	6:08
11.	"The Blessing" (with We The Kingdom)	Kari Jobe; Cody Carnes; Steven Furtick; Chris Brown	6:52
12.	"Peace" (with We The Kingdom)	E. Cash	4:54
Total length:			68:45

- Songwriting credits adapted from PraiseCharts.

== Charts ==
=== Weekly charts ===
Weekly chart performance for Peace
Chart (2020)	Peak position
Swiss Albums (Schweizer Hitparade)	55
UK Christian & Gospel Albums (OCC)	3
US Billboard 200	85
US Christian Albums (Billboard)	2
US Independent Albums (Billboard)	10

=== Year-end charts ===
Year-end chart performance for Peace
Chart (2020)	Position
US Christian Albums (Billboard)	18
Chart (2021)	Position
US Christian Albums (Billboard)	29
Chart (2022)	Position
US Christian Albums (Billboard)	24
Chart (2023)	Position
US Christian Albums (Billboard)	33
Chart (2025)	Position
US Top Christian Albums (Billboard)	26

== Release history ==
Region	Date	Format(s)	Label(s)	Ref.
Various	April 10, 2020	Digital download; streaming	Bethel Music	
