= Beautiful Surrender =

Studio album by Jonathan David & Melissa Helser
- Released: September 30, 2016
- Recorded: 2015–2016
- Genres: Praise & worship; contemporary Christian; folk; singer-songwriter
- Length: 64:12
- Labels: Bethel Music; Provident Label Group
- Producers: Ed Cash; Brian Johnson (exec.); Joel Taylor (exec.)

Jonathan David & Melissa Helser chronology
On the Shores (2012)	Beautiful Surrender (2016)

Singles from Beautiful Surrender
- 1. "You Came (Lazarus)" Released: February 17, 2017

Beautiful Surrender is the eighth album by American Christian worship duo Jonathan David & Melissa Helser, released on September 30, 2016, from Bethel Music through Provident Label Group. Ed Cash handled the production of the album, with Brian Johnson and Joel Taylor serving as executive producers.

Touted as a "vibrant response" to On the Shores, their 2012 album, Beautiful Surrender was the duo's first release with Bethel Music since joining the collective in 2014. The album also included a radio remix of their Dove Award-winning hit single, "No Longer Slaves," as a bonus track. The album became a breakthrough hit for the Helsers, debuting at No. 1 on the Christian music charts in the US and UK as well as attaining mainstream rankings in the US, Australia, Canada and Norway. Following its release, the album spawned "You Came (Lazarus)" as a single, impacting Christian radio in the United States on February 17, 2017.

== Background ==
Jonathan David & Melissa Helser announced that their eighth album, Beautiful Surrender, would be released internationally on September 30, 2016, via Bethel Music and Provident Label Group. With multi award-winning producer Ed Cash handling the project, Beautiful Surrender was recorded in Nashville, Tennessee with instrumentation provided Cageless Birds, a North Carolina–based collective that the duo helped co-found. The duo elaborated on the core message of the album, saying:

Surrender is to cease resistance, yield control and give oneself up to the power of another. When you find the One your heart loves, surrender is a beautiful, effortless fall – not a duty or a task. When Jesus said 'follow me,' they saw everything they ever wanted and joyfully surrendered all they had. What would it look like to truly surrender without reservation, without caution, and give in fully not to an idea of God, but to God himself?

— Jonathan David & Melissa Helser

== Promotion ==
In a bid to promote the album, Jonathan David & Melissa Helser launched the album's pre-order with "Beautiful Surrender", "Catch the Wind" and "Find Me" being released as promotional singles as they were availed for instant download in September 2016.

== Singles ==
After to the album's release, the song "You Came (Lazarus)" was released by Bethel Music to Christian radio in the United States as the lead single from the album, impacting on February 17, 2017.

== Critical reception ==
Professional ratings
Review scores
Source	Rating
Cross Rhythms	10/10 squares
NewReleaseToday	4.5/5 stars
One Man in the Middle	4.15/5
Today's Christian Entertainment	3.5/5 stars

Matt Collar of AllMusic called the album "a heartfelt production showcasing the husband-and-wife duo's emotive, literate, faith-based sound." Cross Rhythms reviewer Tony Cummings gave the album a perfect ten squares rating, saying that "the worshipping Church has in these two servants an inspiring couple of songsmiths and worship leaders." The album garnered a four star rating from a NewReleaseToday review by Mary Nikkel, describes the sound as being "more like an indie folk-influenced release than most contemporary worship records." Nikkel concluded that "Beautiful Surrender's thematic hub is the freedom that comes from full surrender to the true Gospel, the fullness of Jesus's love and grace. Those timeless concepts are expressed in often delightfully unexpected ways both musically and lyrically, establishing the Helser's unique and vital role in the Bethel Music worship family." Reviewing for One Man in the Middle, Tony Cummings rating the album eight-point-three-out-of-ten, is of the opinion that the "whole album is a positive one with a lot of depth to the lyrics and a great combination of vocals." Kelly Meade, in a review for Today's Christian Entertainment, rated the album three and a half stars saying that the overall feel of the album is "one of reflective and worshipful sentiments with heartfelt lyrics and soothing melodies."

== Commercial performance ==
Beautiful Surrender was a breakthrough hit for Jonathan David & Melissa Helser, accruing sales of 9,000 copies in its first week, thus vaulting in at No. 1 on Billboard-issued Christian Albums chart dated October 22, 2016, chronicling the best selling releases of the genre that week. The album also reached No. 54 on the US Billboard 200 chart.

In Australia, Jonathan David & Melissa Helser had their first entry on the mainstream ARIA Albums Chart, with Beautiful Surrender debuting at No. 32 on the chart.

In Canada, the duo also debuted on the all-genre Canadian Albums Chart, with the album peaking at No. 67.

Beautiful Surrender also became the duo's first entry on the OCC's Official Christian & Gospel Albums Chart in the United Kingdom, debuting at No. 1 for the week ending October 13, 2016.

== Track listing ==
Beautiful Surrender
No.	Title	Writer(s)	Length
1.	"Beautiful Surrender"	Jonathan David Helser; Melissa Helser; Molly Skaggs	5:16
2.	"You Came (Lazarus)"	Ed Cash; J. D. Helser; M. Helser	5:01
3.	"Find Me"	J. D. Helser	4:25
4.	"Outrageous Love"	Cash; J. D. Helser	5:06
5.	"Strength"	Cash; M. Helser; Skaggs	6:21
6.	"The Gospel"	Cash; J. D. Helser	4:30
7.	"So Much Grace"	Cash; J. D. Helser	4:55
8.	"Beautiful Jesus"	Cash; M. Helser; Skaggs	6:31
9.	"First Love"	J. D. Helser	6:22
10.	"Abba (Arms of a Father)"	Cash; J. D. Helser	5:30
11.	"Catch the Wind"	Cash; J. D. Helser; M. Helser; Skaggs	6:22
12.	"No Longer Slaves" (Radio Remix; Bonus Track)	Joel Case; J. D. Helser; Brian Johnson	4:10
Total length:			64:12

== Personnel ==
Adapted from AllMusic.

- Joel Case – guitar, violin
- Ed Cash – acoustic guitar, electric guitar, engineer, producer, programming
- James Duke – electric guitar
- Chris Estes – director
- Chris Greely – mixing
- Stephen Hart – design, photography
- Jonathan David Helser – acoustic guitar, vocals
- Melissa Helser – vocals
- Brian Johnson – executive producer
- Joe LaPorta – mastering
- Paul Mabury – drums, drums programming
- Buckley Miller – engineer
- Anna Naphtali – photography
- Claire Nunn – cello
- Matt Pierson – bass
- Stephen Price – piano
- Luke Skaggs – violin
- Molly Skaggs – background vocals, piano
- Jake Stevens – electric guitar
- Joel Taylor – executive producer

== Charts ==
Chart (2017)	Peak position
Australian Albums (ARIA)	32
Canadian Albums (Billboard)	67
Norwegian Albums (VG-lista)	37
UK Christian & Gospel Albums (OCC)	1
US Billboard 200	54
US Top Christian Albums (Billboard)	1

== Release history ==
Region	Date	Format	Label	Ref.
Various	September 30, 2016	CD	Provident Label Group	
Various	September 30, 2016	digital download; streaming	Bethel Music	
