= Ain't No Grave (Bethel Music song) =

Promotional single by Bethel Music and Molly Skaggs

from the album Victory
- Released: January 4, 2019
- Recorded: 2018
- Genre: Contemporary worship music; Americana
- Length: 8:13
- Label: Bethel Music
- Songwriters: Claude Ely; Jonathan David Helser; Melissa Helser; Molly Skaggs
- Producer: Ed Cash

Music videos
- "Ain't No Grave" (Acoustic) on YouTube
- "Ain't No Grave" (Live) on YouTube
- "Ain't No Grave" (Lyrics) on YouTube

"Ain't No Grave" is a song performed by Bethel Music and Molly Skaggs which was released as a promotional single from Bethel Music's eleventh live album, Victory (2019), on January 4, 2019. The song was written by Jonathan David Helser, Melissa Helser and Molly Skaggs, with Claude Ely receiving a posthumous credit for the interpolation of his identically titled original composition. Ed Cash produced the single. The song peaked at No. 17 on the US Hot Christian Songs chart despite not being an official single.

== Background ==
"Ain't No Grave" was initially released by Bethel Music on January 4, 2019, as one of four promotional singles from Victory, in the lead-up to the album's release which was slated for January 25, 2019. Molly Skaggs shared the story behind the song, saying:

"Ain't No Grave" is rooted in old-time Appalachian gospel music. It is a marriage of the old, with Brother Claude Ely's original chorus and the new, my personal testimony of overcoming fear and shame, woven into each verse. For me, this song is steeped in the reality of Jesus and what He has done for me and my community. This is an anthem for anyone who is ready to follow Jesus and walk out of the graves in their daily life. "Ain't No Grave" is a testimony of faith, a song for those who are ready to shake off the victim mentality and stand up in the truth of who they really are.

== Composition ==
"Ain't No Grave" is in the key of B minor with a moderate rock tempo of 74 beats per minute and a musical time signature of 4/4.

== Commercial performance ==
The song debuted on the US Hot Christian Songs chart at No. 40 on the issue week of January 19, 2019. After the release of Victory, it jumped to No. 27. In its fifteenth week on the chart, the song peaked at No. 17.

== Music videos ==
Bethel Music released the live music video of "Ain't No Grave" with Molly Skaggs leading the song during a worship service at Bethel Church through their YouTube channel on January 5, 2019. The lyric video of the song was released on January 25, 2019, on YouTube by Bethel Music. An acoustic performance video shot on location in North Carolina, with Skaggs singing was published on YouTube on September 11, 2019.

== Charts ==
=== Weekly charts ===
Chart (2019)	Peak position
US Hot Christian Songs (Billboard)	17

=== Year-end charts ===
Chart (2019)	Position
US Christian Songs (Billboard)	80
