= Ain't No Grave =

American gospel song

"Ain't No Grave" (also known as "Gonna Hold This Body Down") is a traditional American gospel song attributed to Claude Ely of Virginia.

== History ==
Claude Ely, a songwriter and preacher from Virginia, describes composing the song while sick with tuberculosis in 1934 when he was twelve years old. His family prayed for his health, and in response he spontaneously performed this song. An African-American gospel song, "C'aint no grave," has been traced back to a 1933 Church of God in Christ hymnal by blogger Debi Simons. That version was recorded by Bozie Sturdivant in July 1942 (and released in 1943 as "Ain't No Grave Can Hold My Body Down") in a slower, gospel style and in 1946-7 by Sister Rosetta Tharpe with barrelhouse piano, Tharpe having grown up in COGIC. The COGIC-affiliated duo, The Two Gospel Keys, recorded an uptempo version in April 1947.

The song in Ely's version was recorded (and copyrighted) in 1953, even though he wrote it as early as 1935.

== Artists covering the song ==
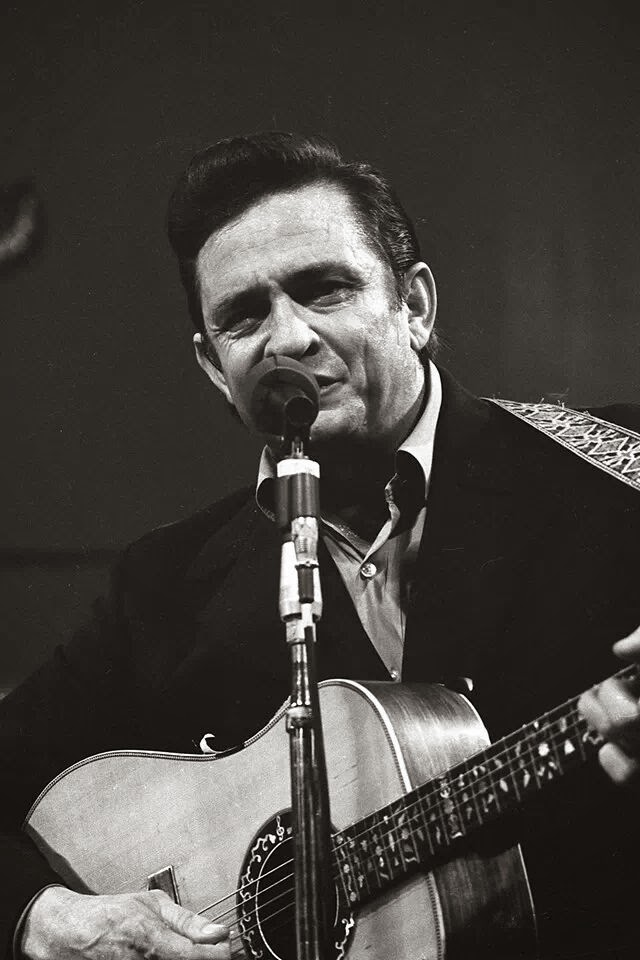
Johnny Cash recorded one of the most notable covers of "Ain't No Grave" in 2003, released on a posthumous album in 2010

Many notable artists have performed the song. The slower, black gospel melody was used by Tharpe into the 1960s, and covered by folksinger Rolf Cahn in 1959, and gospel artist Liz McComb. In 1967, the song was featured in the film Cool Hand Luke while Luke (Paul Newman) is digging a grave, performed by Harry Dean Stanton. The lines "Meet me, Jesus, meet me / Won't you meet me in the middle of the air / And if my wings should fail me, Lord / Won't you provide me with another pair" in some recorded versions (including the one by Johnny Cash) are shared with some recorded versions of the traditional song "In My Time of Dying" (including those by Bob Dylan and by Led Zeppelin).

In 1980, The Singing Cookes recorded the song on the album Live.

In 1985, The Nelons recorded the song on the album In One Accord.

in 1986, Janet Paschal recorded the song on the album Live!

In 1989, Russ Taff covered the song on the album The Way Home and also as an extended version on the 1991 album Under Their Influence.

In 1997, it was featured in the film The Apostle, performed by lead actor Robert Duvall.

In 2006, Crooked Still covered the song on their album Shaken by a Low Sound, which received widespread attention when it was featured in the 2020 video game The Last of Us Part II.

In 2010, the artist Charlie Parr recorded a cover of the song on the album When the Devil Goes Blind.

In 2011, it was featured in the film Blackthorn, performed by lead actor Sam Shepard.

In 2012, Scott Lucas and the Married Men covered the song on their Blood Half Moon album. Through the latter half of 2018, lead singer Scott Lucas' primary band, Local H, played this version on tour.

In 2014, Davy Knowles recorded the song on his solo album The Outsider.

In 2010, Tom Jones recorded the song on his Praise & Blame album.

In 2017, bluegrass artists Wilson Banjo Co. recorded "Ain't No Grave" on their album Spirits in the Hills. Their rootsy acoustic version hit the number one spot of the bluegrass gospel charts multiple times throughout 2018.

In 2017, a cover of the song by Hidden Citizens appears in the trailer for the film Aftermath. That same year, a version of the song performed by Bror Gunnar Jansson was used over the end credits of the first episode of Damnation.

In 2018, the song was used as the end credits song for the final episode of the first season of Altered Carbon, performed by Renée Elise Goldsberry.

In 2019, an adapted version was released by the band Cageless Birds on their album We Bow, and appears on the Bethel Music album Victory, with Molly Skaggs singing the lead vocals in both songs.

In 2020, Vika and Linda released a version as the lead single from their album, Sunday (The Gospel According to Iso).

== Johnny Cash cover ==
"Ain't No Grave"

Song by Johnny Cash

from the album American VI: Ain't No Grave
- Released: February 23, 2010
- Recorded: 2003
- Studio: House of Cash
- Genre: Country folk; gospel blues; Southern gothic
- Length: 2:53
- Label: American Recordings
- Songwriter: Claude Ely
- Producer: Rick Rubin

Johnny Cash covered "Ain't No Grave" shortly before his death in September 2003. The recording was not released until February 9, 2010, as part of a posthumous album titled American VI: Ain't No Grave.

In 2010, Cash's version of the song was featured in the episode "Patriot Down" of NCIS.

In 2011, professional wrestler The Undertaker briefly used Cash's version as his entrance theme in the lead up to and including his match at WrestleMania XXVII with Triple H.

In 2012, Quentin Tarantino used Cash's version in the film Django Unchained.

In 2016, Cash's version was featured in the end credits to the first episode of Westworld.

In 2017, Cash's version was featured in the second trailer for Pirates of the Caribbean: Dead Men Tell No Tales and in the BBC documentary The Scottish Bounty Hunter about bounty hunter Christian Matlock.
