= Moments: Mighty Sound =

Live album by Bethel Music
- Released: May 11, 2018
- Recorded: 2017
- Venue: Bethel Church, Redding, California
- Genre: Worship; CCM
- Length: 114:50
- Label: Bethel Music

Bethel Music live album chronology
Starlight (2017)	Moments: Mighty Sound (2018)	Victory (2019)

Bethel Music chronology
After All These Years (Instrumental) (2017)	Moments: Mighty Sound (2018)	Victory (2019)

Moments: Mighty Sound is the tenth live album by California-based worship collective Bethel Music, it is also their fifteenth album overall. On May 11, 2018, the album was released by the collective's imprint label of the same name.

== Background ==
Bethel Music published on its social media channels that an upcoming release would be unveiled on Friday, May 11, 2018 at 9AM Pacific Standard Time. Moments: Mighty Sound was released on that day. Touted as Bethel Music's "debut spontaneous worship album," Moments: Mighty Sound is a collection of twelve songs recorded live at Bethel Church in Redding, California. The collection is said to be representing "the merging of the stewarded [songs] and the divine [spontaneous], where earthly efforts collide with Heaven's intervention." Most songs contain extended times of spontaneous worship as well as new spontaneous worship songs are found on the record.

The worship leaders featured on Moments: Mighty Sound are Amanda Cook, Steffany Gretzinger, Kalley Heiligenthal, Melissa Helser, Brian Johnson, Jenn Johnson, Paul McClure, Brittany Mondesir, Leeland Mooring, Jeremy Riddle, Molly Skaggs and Reuben Morgan of Hillsong Worship.

== Critical reception ==
Professional ratings
Review scores
Source	Rating
Today's Christian Entertainment	3.7/5

Kelly Meade assigned the album a three-point-seven star rating at Today's Christian Entertainment, saying "If you allow yourselves to be completely open and drawn in by the words being sung, you may find an even deeper connection to Christ and your relationship strengthened as you listen to the passionate performances." In a Worship Musician Magazine review of the album, Gerod Bass said "If Bethel wanted a true 'get-out-of-the-way-and-let-the-spirit-move' type of album, they accomplished it with this one." Bass concluded that "Moments: Mighty Sound is a wonderful reminder that we need to stop every day to let God have his way in us, and to have our own moments with Him."

== Commercial performance ==
In the United States, for the week ending May 17, 2018, Moments: Mighty Sound earned sales of 5,000 equivalent album units, thus registering at No. 2 on the U.S. Billboard Christian Albums chart (dated May 26). Moments: Mighty Sound is Bethel Music's tenth album to appear in the Top 3 sector of the Christian Albums chart. The album was also the thirteenth best-selling digital album in the same week, reached No. 10 on the Independent Albums chart, whilst appearing on the all-inclusive Billboard 200 chart at No. 168.

== Track listing ==
Moments: Mighty Sound
No.	Title	Writer(s)	Worship leader(s)	Length
1.	"Mighty Sound" (Spontaneous)	Brian Johnson; Jenn Johnson	Brian Johnson; Jenn Johnson	9:13
2.	"Reckless Love" (Spontaneous)	Cory Asbury; Caleb Culver; Ran Jackson	Steffany Gretzinger	9:59
3.	"Spirit Move" (Spontaneous)	Kalley Heiligenthal; Amanda Cook; B. Johnson	Kalley Heiligenthal	9:59
4.	"Catch the Wind" (Spontaneous)	Melissa Helser; Jonathan David Helser; Molly Skaggs	Melissa Helser	9:49
5.	"Like a Flood" (Instrumental)	Molly Skaggs	Molly Skaggs	6:21
6.	"Pieces" (Spontaneous)	Cook; Steffany Gretzinger	Amanda Cook	10:44
7.	"Come to Me" (Spontaneous)	J. Johnson; John Hendrickson	Jenn Johnson; Brian Johnson	9:43
8.	"On the Shores" (Spontaneous)	M. Helser	Jeremy Riddle; Steffany Gretzinger	13:49
9.	"In Over My Head" (Spontaneous)	J. Johnson; John-Paul Gentile	Jenn Johnson	8:05
10.	"Where You Are" (Spontaneous)	Leeland Mooring	Leeland Mooring	12:08
11.	"Cornerstone" (Spontaneous)	Eric Liljero; Reuben Morgan; Edward Mote; Jonas Myrin	Brittany Mondesir; Reuben Morgan	8:05
12.	"Breathe Out Your Praise" (Spontaneous)	Paul McClure; Mooring	Paul McClure; Leeland Mooring	6:53
Total length:				114:50

== Charts ==
=== Album ===
Chart (2018)	Peak position
Swiss Albums (Schweizer Hitparade)	68
UK Christian & Gospel Albums (OCC)	3
US Billboard 200	168
US Christian Albums (Billboard)	2
US Independent Albums (Billboard)	10

=== Songs ===
Year	Song	Peak positions
Year	Song	US Christian
2018	"Reckless Love (Spontaneous)" (Bethel Music and Steffany Gretzinger)	38

== Release history ==
Region	Date	Format	Label	Ref.
Various	May 11, 2018	Digital download; streaming	Bethel Music	
