= John Wilds =

American contemporary Christian musician

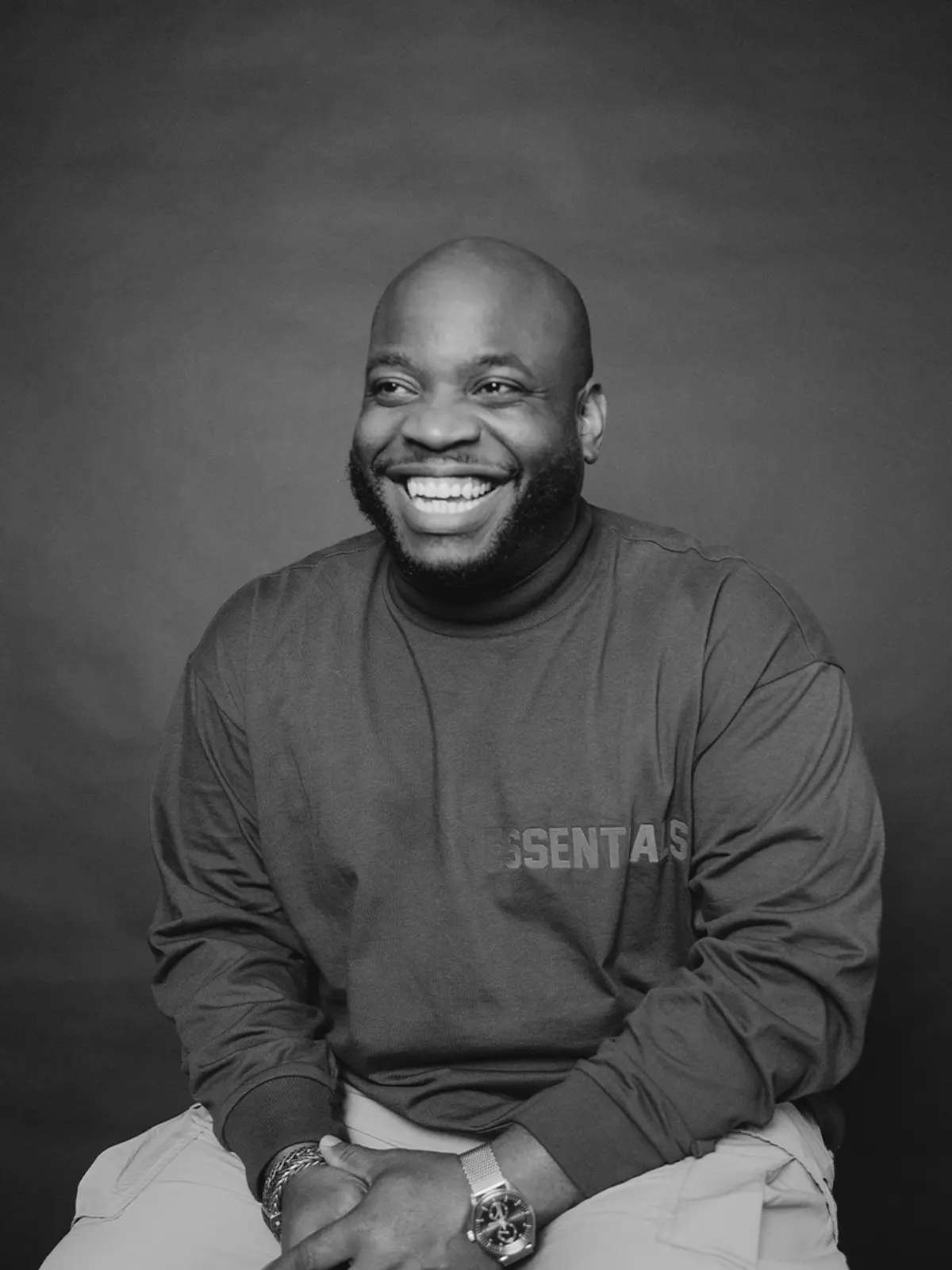

Background information
- Origin: Daytona Beach, Florida, U.S.
- Genres: Contemporary Christian music; contemporary worship music
- Occupations: Singer; songwriter; pastor
- Instrument: Vocals
- Years active: 2021–present
- Label: Bethel Music
- Website: johnwilds.com

John Wilds, is an American contemporary Christian musician, worship leader, songwriter, and recording artist. He joined the Bethel Music Collective in 2021 and made his collective album debut with “Forever Be Praised” on the album Simple (2022). He is featured on Jesus Image’s Jesus (Live) (2022) album singing “Way Maker,” “Alpha And Omega,” and “You Are Holy.”

He also sang as a background vocalist on Brooke Ligertwood’s solo album Seven (2022). He tours with the collective and continues to collaborate with many writers, producers, and musicians writing for projects. On April 25, 2025 Wilds released his first EP for Bethel Music titled "I Want Jesus (Live)".

He currently serves as the Worship Pastor at Legacy Nashville, in Nashville, Tennessee.

== Personal life ==
John and his wife, Natalie, lived in Daytona Beach, Florida with their three children. He served as the worship pastor at Calvary Christian Center in Ormond Beach, Florida for 12 and a half years.
