= For Every Curse =

Studio album by Daniel Bashta
- Released: April 20, 2015
- Genre: Worship, CCM, Christian rock, pop rock
- Length: 32:20
- Label: Go Forth

Daniel Bashta chronology
The Invisible (2013)	For Every Curse (2015)

For Every Curse is the third studio album from Daniel Bashta. Go Forth Sounds released the album on April 20, 2015.

== Critical reception ==
Professional ratings
Review scores
Source	Rating
New Release Today	4/5 stars
Worship Leader	4/5 stars

Awarding the album four stars at New Release Today, Kevin Davis states, "Daniel has taken the next step forward in establishing his unique brand of vulnerable, sincere and gourmet worship songwriting...The album is loaded with meaningful and moving songs for the Church. Get ready to experience and encounter Jesus in these captivating songs." Jeremy Armstrong, giving the album four stars from Worship Leader, writes, "On For Every Curse, Daniel Bashta offers beautiful prayer-yawps that drip with scripture and feel like an Old Testament prophet beckoning the freedom of the Savior—the rescue of our limitless God who made promises at the beginning of time that we still cling to with every ounce of our beings...Along with that, he creates music that feels as big as the stratosphere, seemingly to try to keep pace with the greatness of our God. It's an impressive feat."

== Awards and accolades ==
This album was No. 2, on the Worship Leader's Top 5 Community Funded/Indie Releases list.

The song, "Seas of Crimson", was No. 2, on the Worship Leader's Top 20 Songs of 2015 list.

== Track listing ==
No.	Title	Writer(s)	Length
1.	"Hallelujah Chorus"		2:38
2.	"Seas of Crimson"	Daniel Bashta, Brian Johnson, Bobby Strand, Joel Taylor	6:11
3.	"Praise the Lord"		4:21
4.	"All Hail"		5:08
5.	"Still I Will Praise You"		4:59
6.	"I Will Sing"		4:28
7.	"Praise the Invisible"		4:35
Total length:			32:20

== Chart performance ==
Chart (2015)	Peak position
US Christian Albums (Billboard)	41
