= More (Jeremy Riddle album) =

Studio album by Jeremy Riddle
- Released: November 17, 2017
- Recorded: 2017
- Studios: Bethel Music, Redding, CA; Richmond Park, Los Angeles, CA; United Recording Studios, Los Angeles, CA
- Genres: Worship; contemporary Christian music
- Length: 58:09
- Label: Bethel Music
- Producers: Ran Jackson; Ricky Jackson; Nicolas Balachandran; Brian Johnson (exec.); Joel Taylor (exec.)

Jeremy Riddle chronology
Furious (2011)	More (2017)

More is the fifth studio album by American Christian worship musician Jeremy Riddle. The album was released on November 17, 2017, by Bethel Music. Riddle worked with Ran Jackson, Ricky Jackson and Nicolas Balachandran in the production of the album.

== Background ==
Jeremy Riddle, after a seven-year hiatus from solo releases, announced that More, his fifth studio album and his first release via Bethel Music, would be released on November 17, 2017.

Prior to joining Bethel Church in Redding, California in 2011 as a worship pastor, Riddle released notable albums such as Full Attention (2007), The Now and Not Yet (2008) and Furious (2011) and which include songs such as "Sweetly Broken", "Bless His Name" and "Furious". As a member of Bethel Music collective, Riddle has co-written and recorded songs such as "This Is Amazing Grace", "Breaking Through", "Be Enthroned", "Fall Afresh", "Furious" and "God of the Redeemed" among others. Riddle also spearheaded the inception and development of Tribe, a young adults ministry at Bethel Church.

In a press release published on November 3, 2017 via The Media Collective, Riddle spoke of the creative process leading to the album's production, saying:

The record really started as a feeble cry of praise, not a roar, but then it began to grow and strengthen... Once I had a couple songs under my belt, I realized, there’s still something in here that is worth sharing. It’s a battle when it comes to creativity. It's spiritual. It's never been the external critics -- people who love your work or have some beef with it – my battle is internal. The enemy is so opposed to the children of God creating the things we’re meant to create.

– Jeremy Riddle, The Media Collective

== Promotion ==
On November 3, 2017, three songs were made available for instant download at the start of the digital pre-order period in the lead up to the album's release, which was slated for November 17, 2017. The three pre-order singles were "All Hail King Jesus", "More" and "No Fear in Your Love".

== Critical reception ==
Professional ratings
Review scores
Source	Rating
CCM Magazine	4/5 stars
The Christian Beat	4.5/5 stars
Cross Rhythms	9/10 squares
NewReleaseToday	4/5 stars

Rating the album four stars in a CCM Magazine review, Kevin Sparkman believes that the album "encompasses all that we've come to love from Bethel Music's style of anthemic worship on through to some really well-produced power pop." Signaling in a four and a half star review by The Christian Beat, Chris Major realizes, "More is a lyrically strong collection, developing themes of adoration and awe intertwined with desire and passion for Christ's presence." Bestowing a nine square rating for Cross Rhythms, Stephen Luff says the album "manages to stride the musical chasm of inspiration and melodies and song hooks that stand repeated listening." At NewReleaseToday, Jay Wright rated the album four stars out of five in his review, saying that "More is a solid collection of heartfelt cries for more of God and a hunger to understand His love on a deeper level. It celebrates this love which heals and restores us and brings us through our toughest times. Jeremy Riddle's rough vocals bring this message strongly, while creative rhythms leave the listener coming back for more. Though this is a powerful worship album, it's also a fun album to enjoy!" In a superbly positive review by Sharefaith Magazine, it was concluded that "Jeremy Riddle's return to solo work might have been a long time coming, but it's all the better for it. More is an album for those who might have been caught in the doldrums, not even realizing they're settling for a life that's less than abundant. It's a heart cry spoken in the authentic language of an artist who has been there. For the listener willing to push forward in faith, this album is an invitation to step into the more."

== Commercial performance ==
In the United States, More debuted at No. 4 on Billboard's Christian Albums chart dated December 9, 2017, having earned sales of 5,000 equivalent album units in its first week. More is Jeremy Riddle's first album to debut in the top ten on the Christian Albums chart. The album was also listed as the fourteenth best-selling digital release in the country that same week, and reached No. 13 on Billboard's Independent Albums chart.

== Track listing ==
More — CD track listing
No.	Title	Writer(s)	Length
1.	"More"	Jeremy Riddle; Ran Jackson; Ricky Jackson; Nicolas Balachandran	5:06
2.	"Even If (All the More)"	Riddle; Ran Jackson; N. Balachandran	5:02
3.	"It Only Gets Stronger"	Riddle; Ran Jackson	4:02
4.	"Overwhelming"	Ran Jackson; Jess Cates; Anthony Skinner	4:41
5.	"All Hail King Jesus"	Riddle; Peter Mattis; Ran Jackson; Steffany Gretzinger	8:17
6.	"No Fear in Your Love"	Riddle; Bryan Torwalt; Katie Torwalt; Ran Jackson; N. Balachandran; Gretzinger	6:12
7.	"Holy Ground"	Riddle; Ran Jackson; Gretzinger; Amanda Cook	5:33
8.	"Sing to My Heart"	Riddle; Ran Jackson	5:19
9.	"Love on Fire"	Riddle; Gretzinger; Ricky Jackson; Ran Jackson; Gabrielle Balachandran	5:01
10.	"Shadow"	Riddle	4:03
11.	"Made in Love"	Riddle	4:53
Total length:			58:09

More — Digital edition
No.	Title	Length
1.	"More"	5:06
2.	"Even If (All the More)"	5:02
3.	"It Only Gets Stronger"	4:02
4.	"Overwhelming"	4:41
5.	"All Hail King Jesus"	8:17
6.	"No Fear in Your Love"	6:12
7.	"Holy Ground"	5:33
8.	"Sing to My Heart"	5:19
9.	"Love on Fire"	5:01
10.	"Yeshua"	3:15
11.	"Shadow"	4:03
12.	"Made in Love"	4:53
13.	"It Only Gets Stronger" (Lo-Fi Version)	6:44
Total length:		68:08

== Personnel ==
Adapted from AllMusic.

- Jeremy Riddle – vocals, keyboards, programming
- Nicolas Balachandran – keyboards, programming, guitars, bass, vocals
- Tyler Chester – keyboards
- Will Gramling – keyboards
- Ran Jackson – keyboards, programming, bass, string arrangements, vocals
- Ricky Jackson – keyboards, programming, guitars, vocals
- Charles Jones – organ, vocals
- Taylor Johnson – guitars
- Sean Hurley – bass
- Adam Redfield – drums
- Aaron Sterling – drums
- Jeremy Larson – strings
- Aalok Balachandran – vocals
- Jessi Collins – vocals
- Amanda Cook – vocals

== Production ==
- Brian Johnson – executive producer
- Joel Taylor – executive producer
- Nicolas Balachandran – producer, engineer
- Ran Jackson – producer, engineer
- Ricky Jackson – producer, engineer
- John Raush – engineer
- Michael Brauer – mixing
- Mark Endert – mixing
- Adam Hawkins – mixing
- Adam Ayan – mastering
- Robby Busick – production manager
- Bethany Wilford – project manager
- Aly Whitworth –project coordinator
- Chris Estes – director
- Kiley Goodpasture – creative director
- Stephen Hart – art direction, design, photography
- Lucas Sankey – photography

== Charts ==
Chart (2017)	Peak position
Australian Digital Albums (ARIA)	25
UK Christian & Gospel Albums (OCC)	2
US Top Christian Albums (Billboard)	4
US Digital Albums (Billboard)	15
US Independent Albums (Billboard)	13

== Release history ==
Region	Date	Format	Label	Ref.
Worldwide	November 17, 2017	CD	Bethel Music	
Worldwide	November 17, 2017	digital download; streaming	Bethel Music	
