= Sophia, North Carolina =

Unincorporated community in North Carolina, US

Coordinates: 35°49′23″N 79°51′39″W

Sophia (/soʊˈfi/ soh-fee) is an unincorporated community in central Randolph County in the U.S. state of North Carolina. It is located along U.S. Route 311, just northwest of the route's intersection with I-73/I-74/US 220 and southeast of Archdale. The ZIP Code for Sophia is 27350.

== Notable people ==
- Jonathan David & Melissa Helser, Christian music duo
