= Scott Greenstein =

American businessman

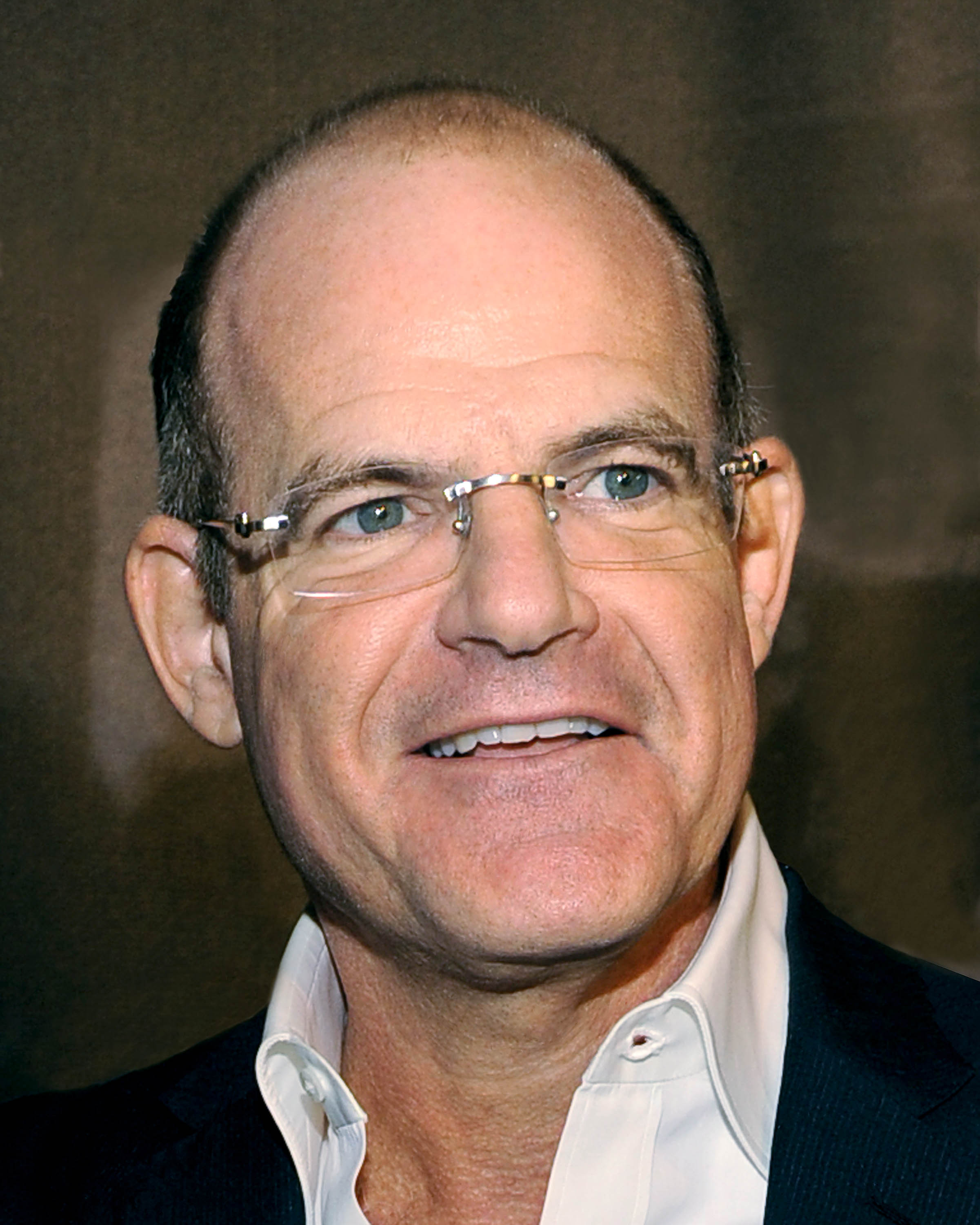
- Born: 1959 (age 66–67)
- Occupations: President and CCO of Sirius XM Radio
- Employer: Sirius XM Radio

Scott Greenstein (born 1959) is president and chief content officer of Sirius XM Radio. He leads the programming and advertising sales for the radio and subscription media companies of Sirius. Under Greenstein, SiriusXM has pioneered new channels and formats. He also led SiriusXM's signing and renewing of key agreements with the National Football League, Major League Baseball, NASCAR, the National Basketball Association, the National Hockey League and Premier League soccer. Before SiriusXM, Greenstein was Chairman of USA Films. During his tenure, the studio released many films, including Steven Soderbergh's Traffic, Spike Jonze’s Being John Malkovich, Robert Altman’s Gosford Park, and the Coen Brothers’ The Man Who Wasn't There. Greenstein also served as Co-President of October Films, where Scott was instrumental in acquiring, marketing and releasing such films as The Apostle and executive producer Steven Spielberg’s Academy Award-winning documentary The Last Days.

== Honors ==
In 2006, Greenstein was honored by LIFEbeat, the music industry's charitable organization dedicated to reaching America’s youth with the message of HIV/AIDS prevention.

In 2009, Greenstein was awarded the First Knight of the Royal Order of the Polar Star by the King of Sweden, for his contributions in promoting Swedish music and culture in North America.
