= Goodness of God =

2019 song by Bethel Music and Jenn Johnson

Single by Jenn Johnson and Bethel Music

from the album Victory
- Released: November 1, 2019
- Recorded: 2018
- Genre: Contemporary worship music; Christian country
- Length: 3:56
- Label: Bethel Music
- Songwriters: Ed Cash; Ben Fielding; Jason Ingram; Brian Johnson; Jenn Johnson
- Producer: Ed Cash

Bethel Music singles chronology
"Alabaster Heart" (2019)	"Goodness of God" (2019)	"God of Revival" (2020)

Jenn Johnson singles chronology
"You're Gonna Be OK" (2017)	"Goodness of God" (2019)	"Famous For (I Believe)" (2020)

Music videos
- "Goodness of God" (Live) on YouTube
- "Goodness of God" (Lyrics) on YouTube

"Goodness of God" is a song by Bethel Music and Jenn Johnson, which was released as the third single from Bethel Music's eleventh live album, Victory (2019), on November 1, 2019. The song was written by Ed Cash, Ben Fielding, Jason Ingram, Brian Johnson and Jenn Johnson. Ed Cash handled the production of the single.

"Goodness of God" peaked at No. 15 on the US Hot Christian Songs chart. The song was nominated for the 2020 GMA Dove Award for Worship Recorded Song of the Year.

The song was notably covered by CeCe Winans, who released her version of the song on her live album, Believe For It (2021). CeCe Winans' recording peaked at No. 6 on the Hot Christian Songs chart, and No. 2 on the Hot Gospel Songs chart. CeCe Winans' rendition of "Goodness of God" was nominated for the GMA Dove Award Contemporary Gospel Recorded Song of the Year at the 2022 GMA Dove Awards.

== Background ==
"Goodness of God" was initially released by Bethel Music on January 4, 2019, as one of four promotional singles from Victory (2019), in the lead-up to its release which was slated for January 25, 2019. Jenn Johnson shared with Fox News that the song had been inspired by the process of adopting her fourth child, as she had been singing impromptu into her phone while driving on a long country road about the faithfulness and kindness of God. The song was then developed from the impromptu recording.

The radio version of "Goodness of God" was released in digital format on November 1, 2019. The song began play on Christian radio stations on November 8, 2019.

Bethel Music released an instrumental version of the song on their album, Without Words: Genesis, on November 15, 2019. On April 10, 2020, Bethel Music also released an alternate version of the song on their second studio album, Peace.

== Composition ==
"Goodness of God" is composed in the key of A♭ with a moderate rock tempo of 63 beats per minute and a musical time signature of 4/4.

== Accolades ==
Year	Association	Category	Result	Ref.
2020	GMA Dove Awards	Gospel Worship Recorded Song of the Year	Won	

== Music videos ==
Bethel Music released the live music video of "Goodness of God" with Jenn Johnson leading the song during a worship service at Bethel Church through their YouTube channel on January 4, 2019. The lyric video of the song was released on January 25, 2019, on YouTube by Bethel Music.

== Charts ==
=== Weekly charts ===
Weekly chart performance
Chart (2019–2020)	Peak position
US Hot Christian Songs (Billboard)	15
US Christian Airplay (Billboard)	19

=== Year-end charts ===
Year-end chart performance
Chart (2019)	Position
US Christian Songs (Billboard)	85
Chart (2020)	Position
US Christian Songs (Billboard)	59
US Christian Airplay (Billboard)	49
US Christian AC (Billboard)	40

== Certifications ==
Region	Certification	Certified units/sales
United States (RIAA)	Gold	500,000^{‡}
^{‡} Sales+streaming figures based on certification alone.

== Release history ==
Region	Date	Format	Label	Ref.
Various	November 1, 2019	Digital download; streaming	Bethel Music	
United States	November 8, 2019	Christian radio	Bethel Music	

== CeCe Winans version ==
"Goodness of God"

Song by CeCe Winans

from the album Believe for It
- Released: March 12, 2021
- Recorded: 2020
- Studio: TBN Studio, Nashville, Tennessee, U.S.
- Genre: Contemporary worship music; Christian R&B
- Length: 4:57
- Label: Puresprings Gospel; Fair Trade Services
- Songwriters: Ed Cash; Jenn Johnson; Jason Ingram; Brian Johnson; Ben Fielding
- Producer: Kyle Lee

Music videos
- "Goodness of God" on YouTube
- "Goodness of God" (Lyrics) on YouTube

CeCe Winans released a cover of the song on her live album Believe For It (2021). Winans' version of "Goodness of God" received a GMA Dove Award nomination for Gospel Worship Recorded Song of the Year at the 2022 GMA Dove Awards.

=== Accolades ===
Awards
Year	Organization	Award	Result	Ref
2022	GMA Dove Awards	Gospel Worship Recorded Song of the Year	Nominated	

=== Commercial performance ===
CeCe Winans's version of "Goodness of God" debuted at No. 22 on the Hot Gospel Songs chart dated May 7, 2022. The song also debuted number 45 on the US Hot Christian Songs chart dated May 14, 2022.

=== Music videos ===
On March 12, 2021, CeCe Winans released the audio video for the song. The lyric video of the song was released on August 3, 2022, on YouTube by CeCe Winans. CeCe Winans released the official music video for "Goodness of God" through her YouTube channel on September 14, 2022.

=== Charts ===
==== Weekly charts ====
Chart performance for "Goodness of God"
Chart (2021–2023)	Peak position
Nigeria Top Gospel Songs (TurnTable)	13
US Hot Christian Songs (Billboard)	6
US Christian Airplay (Billboard)	33
US Gospel Songs (Billboard)	2
US Gospel Airplay (Billboard)	1

==== Year-end charts ====
Year-end chart performance for "Goodness of God"
Chart (2022)	Position
US Christian Songs (Billboard)	63
US Gospel Songs (Billboard)	16
Chart (2023)	Position
US Christian Songs (Billboard)	74
US Gospel Songs (Billboard)	2
US Gospel Airplay (Billboard)	5

=== Certifications ===
Certifications and sales for "Goodness of God"
Region	Certification	Certified units/sales
United States (RIAA)	Platinum	1,000,000^{‡}
^{‡} Sales+streaming figures based on certification alone.

== Other versions ==
- Shane & Shane released their own rendition of "Goodness of God" on their album, The Worship Initiative, Vol. 17 (2019).
- One Sonic Society released their cover of the song featuring Vertical Worship as a standalone single.
- Jason Ingram released his version of the song of part of his EP, Goodness of God (2020).
- North Point Worship released a double-sided single containing their own cover of the song.
- Rhett Walker and Essential Worship released their own version of the song as a standalone single.
- Triumphant Quartet released their Southern Gospel version of the song on their album, Bigger Than Sunday (2021).
- Israel & New Breed released their own cover of the song on their album, Feels Like Home, Vol. 2 (2021).
- We The Kingdom acoustic guitars and vocals cover with spontaneous additions. Uploaded Sept. 9, 2021. https://www.youtube.com/watch?v=qVEOJzAYIW4
- Rodberry and Lizzy Jacques released a version of this song in Haitian Creole. Uploaded December 21, 2021 on YouTube. https://www.youtube.com/watch?v=9KU3J25EcVc
- CeCe Winans released a cover.
- Harmonie London sings a beautiful version of this song for the people of London almost every day.
