= Dana Jennings =

American journalist (born 1957)

Dana Andrew Jennings
- Born: October 1957 (age 68); New Hampshire
- Education: University of New Hampshire
- Occupation: Journalist
- Notable credit(s): The New York Times, The Wall Street Journal, Manchester Union Leader (newspapers); Lonesome Standard Time (novel); Sing Me Back Home: Love, Death and Country Music (non-fiction)
- Children: Two

Dana Jennings (who has also written as Dana Andrew Jennings) is a senior staff editor at The New York Times, as well as an acclaimed author. His books include What a Difference a Dog Makes: Big Lessons on Life, Love and Healing from a Small Pooch; Sing Me Back Home: Love, Death and Country Music; Me, Dad and Number 6; Lonesome Standard Time; Women of Granite; and Mosquito Games.

At the Times since 1993, Jennings has written or edited for Sports, Arts and Leisure, New Jersey weekly, Travel, the City section, Education Life, Culture, The New York Times Book Review, and Escapes.

== Education and career ==
Jennings was born in October 1957. He grew up in the rural town of Kingston, New Hampshire.

He was the first in his family to go to high school, graduating as valedictorian of Sanborn Regional High School in 1975. He then graduated from the University of New Hampshire in 1980.

Jennings began his career in journalism at the Exeter News-Letter; he later wrote for the New Hampshire Union Leader, Wall Street Journal and New York Times. He is the author of six books across both fiction and non-fiction.

Jennings was diagnosed with aggressive prostate cancer in 2008, and he wrote about his illness and recovery extensively for the New York Times' Well Blog.

Jennings is currently working on a graphic novel - "Toxic Youth: Memories of a Factory Boy" - a thematic follow-up to his 2021 sketchbook exhibit at University of New Hampshire titled Toxic Youth.

== Personal ==
After almost 40 years in New Jersey, Jennings moved to Denver, CO, where he and his wife currently live. They have two grown sons and four grandchildren.

Jennings can frequently be found walking among the bison in the Rocky Mountain Arsenal.

== Partial bibliography ==
=== Novels ===
- Lonesome Standard Time. New York: Harcourt, 1996. ISBN 0-15-100188-X ISBN 978-0-15-100188-0
- Women of Granite. New York: Harcourt, 1992. ISBN 0-15-198367-4 ISBN 978-0151983674
- Mosquito Games. Ticknor & Fields, 1989. ASIN: B000ONQ4K8

=== For Children ===
- With Goro Sasaki (illustrator). Me, Dad and Number 6. Gulliver Books, 1997. ISBN 0-15-200085-2 ISBN 978-0152000851

=== Non-fiction ===
- Sing Me Back Home: Love, Death and Country Music. (FSG, 2008)
- What a Difference a Dog Makes: Big Lessons on Life, Love and Healing from a Small Pooch. (Doubleday, 2010)

=== Print journalism ===
- ESSAY: "Religion Is Less A Birthright and More a Good Fit" by Dana Jennings. "The New York Times", 2 March 2008.
- Review of Awesome Bill from Dawsonville: My Life in NASCAR by Bill Elliott with Chris Millard. The New York Times, 11 February 2007.
- "ESSAY: After All These Years, A Red-Headed Stranger." The New York Times, 3 July 2005.
- "New York Action Hero." The New York Times, 23 November 2003.
- "MEDIA: At House of Comics, a Writer's Champion." The New York Times, 15 September 2003.
- "MUSIC: Treasured Moments, Living On in Boxed Sets." The New York Times, 10 February 2002.
- "Too Close for Comfort, and Too Far; A Murky Tunnel Full of Buses and What-Ifs." The New York Times, 30 September 2001.
- "The Magic of Comics! While Batman Turns 64, A Fan Goes Back to 9." The New York Times, 27 August 2003.
- "MUSIC: They Have a Right to Sing the Blues, and a Reason." The New York Times, 13 August 2000.
- "In Bayou Country, Music Is Never Second Fiddle." The New York Times, 22 November 1998.
- "Spanning the Globe: 60 Years With Lomax." The New York Times, 13 April 1997.
- "Gathering In a Reaper's Harvest of Song." The New York Times, 13 April 1997.
- "The Juilliard Of Bluegrass Music." The New York Times, 5 January 1997.
- "Remembrance of Things Fast." The New York Times, 20 August 1995.
- "POP MUSIC: Bluegrass, Straight and Pure, Even if the Money's No Good." The New York Times, 23 April 1995.
- "BACKTALK: A Son Grows a Little Older, a Father Grows a Little Younger." The New York Times, 19 June 1994.
