= After All These Years (Instrumental) =

Remix album by Bethel Music
- Released: July 14, 2017
- Genre: Contemporary Christian; worship
- Length: 47:02
- Label: Bethel Music
- Producer: Jason Ingram; Paul Mabury

Bethel Music remix album chronology
Without Words: Synesthesia (2015)	After All These Years (Instrumental) (2017)	Without Words: Genesis (2019)

Bethel Music chronology
Starlight (2017)	After All These Years (Instrumental) (2017)	Moments: Mighty Sound (2018)

After All These Years (Instrumental) is the third remix album by American worship collective Bethel Music and their fourteenth album overall. The album was released on July 14, 2017 by the group's imprint label, Bethel Music.

== Background ==
The album is an instrumental collection of songs with an 88-piece orchestra by Bethel Music from Brian & Jenn Johnson's fourth album, After All These Years (2017), a critically acclaimed and commercially successful release by the duo. The album has been promoted as a project that is "intended to be a tool for devotion; an invitation to step away from the distractions of life into peace, clarity and encounter with God's presence."

== Critical reception ==
Professional ratings
Review scores
Source	Rating
Louder Than The Music	4.5/5 stars

Jono Davies, reviewing the album for Louder Than The Music, bestowed a rating of four and a half stars, observed "moments of pure brilliance here, and there are moments that are also hauntingly beautiful - and if that wasn't enough, there are also moments that just capture your soul when you start to listen." Davies came to the conclusion that "This album sounds different to most albums out now, but for all the right reasons, and it is such a stunning album. This new album is classical, instrumental and modern orchestral music at its best."

== Commercial performance ==
In the week ending August 5, 2017, After All These Years (Instrumental), was registered on Billboard's Christian Albums chart as the forty third best-selling album of the genre in the United States.

== Track listing ==
After All These Years (Instrumental)
No.	Title	Writer(s)	Length
1.	"Mention of Your Name"	Jenn Johnson; Matt Redman; Jonas Myrin; Brian Johnson	5:25
2.	"Only Jesus"	Hank Bentley; Jason Ingram; B. Johnson; Joel Taylor	4:52
3.	"Gravity"	J. Johnson; Seth Mosley	5:06
4.	"I Won't Forget"	B. Johnson; Ingram; Jeremy Riddle; J. Johnson	5:14
5.	"Mercy and Majesty"	B. Johnson; Riddle; Redman; Ingram; Myrin; Ben Glover	4:24
6.	"Here I Bow"	Ingram; Redman; Myrin; B. Johnson; J. Johnson	4:14
7.	"Greater Than All Other Names"	B. Johnson; Ingram; Riddle	5:36
8.	"After All These Years"	B. Johnson; Matt Maher; Ingram	4:34
9.	"You're Gonna Be OK"	J. Johnson; Mosley; Riddle	3:38
10.	"For the One"	J. Johnson; Paul McClure	4:01
Total length:			47:02

== Charts ==
Chart (2017)	Peak position
US Top Christian Albums (Billboard)	43

== Release history ==
Region	Date	Format	Label	Ref.
Worldwide	July 14, 2017	Digital download; streaming	Bethel Music	
