= Daniel Bashta =

American singer (born 1982)

- Born: Daniel John Bashta; January 1, 1982 (age 44); New Orleans, Louisiana, U.S.
- Origin: Atlanta, Georgia, U.S.
- Genres: Contemporary Christian, worship, pop-rock
- Occupations: Singer, songwriter
- Instrument: Vocals
- Years active: 2008–present
- Label: Integrity Music
- Website: www.danielbashta.com

Daniel John Bashta (born January 1, 1982) is an American contemporary Christian singer and songwriter raised in Reserve, Louisiana. On September 6, 2011, Bashta released the album entitled The Sounds of Daniel Bashta, his first full-length studio album with Integrity Music record label. The album charted at No. 39 on the Billboard Magazine Christian Albums and Heatseekers, for the week of September 24, 2011. His song "Like a Lion" became a major Christian Radio hit as "God's Not Dead" for the Newsboys. Bashta's second album, The Invisible, was released as an iTunes LP with downloadable chord charts and special music videos, including "The Invisible Journey".

== History ==
Bashta grew up a missionary, traveling the world with his parents, Richard and Susan, who are now pastors at Living Stones Church in Crown Point, Indiana. They were both very musical — his mother played in the New Jersey Philharmonic and his father was often strumming the guitar and listening to music. Daniel grew up musically-inclined, playing violin at the age of three. He grew up traveling around the world with his parents, planting 25 different churches along the way. He learned how to play guitar, bass, and piano and began to write songs while in Russia between 12 and 16 years of age.

Bashta released his first album, The Sounds of Daniel Bashta, on September 6, 2011. It reached 39 the US Christian and Heartseekers charts.

Returning to the studio for a second album, Bashta embarked on a journey to create something a bit different than his last work. The Invisible was released on February 5, 2013. He hoped that the album would instill hope, above all things.

In 2013, Bashta launched The Roar, "a missions training school aimed at the 'rapid deployment of mission pioneers.'"

== Discography ==
=== Albums ===
Year	Album details	Peak chart positions	
Year	Album details	US Christian	US Heatseakers
2011	The Sounds of Daniel Bashta: Released: September 6, 2011; Label: Integrity; Format: CD, digital download	39	39
2013	The Invisible: Released: February 5, 2013; Label: Integrity; Format: CD, digital download	47	37
2015	For Every Curse: Label: Go Forth; Format: Digital download	41	—
