= The Collingsworth Family =

US musical group

- Origin: Mt. Orab, Ohio, United States
- Genres: Southern Gospel/Inspirational
- Years active: 2000–present
- Labels: Gaither Music Group/Capitol
- Members: Phil Collingsworth; Kim (Keaton) Collingsworth; Brooklyn (Collingsworth) Blair; Courtney (Collingsworth) Metz; Phillip Collingsworth, Jr.; Olivia (Collingsworth) Aichholz
- Website: thecollingsworthfamily.com

The Collingsworth Family is a Southern Gospel/Inspirational group started by Phil and Kim Collingsworth and features their family as the group. They are currently signed to gospel label Gaither Music Group. Phil and Kim have four children: Brooklyn Rose, Courtney Noel, Phillip Jr., and Olivia Diane.

== History ==
Phil and Kim both came from a Christian upbringing. They met in high school and married upon graduating high school. Kim recalls, “We had our first date when I was 16, and he was 21. Poor guy, he had to wait on me to grow up. We were so in love and really wanted to get married. So, I decided to cram four years of high school into three so I could graduate from high school in 1986. The same year he would graduate from college. That plan worked well.”

== Ministry ==
Phil and Kim Collingsworth began their music ministry career in August 1986, when they were musicians at a church camp in Petersburg, Michigan. The two performed as a duo for 14 years, balancing gigs with raising children and Phil’s job at a life insurance agency. In 2000, they decided to tour full-time. That's also when their children — 10, 9, 6 and 2 at the time — became permanent members of the act.

Phil and Kim have provided music presentations for church camps and extended-length revival campaigns. They have also held the positions of Minister of Music at Hobe Sound Bible Church in Hobe Sound, FL, and Director of the Music Division at Union Bible College and Seminary in Westfield, Indiana. Phil was Dean of Enrollment Management at his alma mater, God's Bible School and College, Cincinnati, Ohio.

== Career ==
The Collingsworths signed with Crossroads Entertainment and Marketing in 2003. In 2009, the Collingsworth Family signed with then new Christian label Stowtown Records.

In 2014, The Collingsworth Family recorded two live projects in Spartanburg, South Carolina. Majestic, a live CD and DVD from piano performer Kim Collingsworth and friends stemmed from a show in Spartanburg Memorial Auditorium with a crowd of more than 2,300 over a 5-hour concert. A DVD, We Will Serve the Lord, was released in October, 2014.

In 2018, they released their album Mercy and Love, a collection of covers and new songs.

The group's influence extends beyond the United States. In 2003, they performed in Kosovo, where more than 6,500 U.S. Army personnel heard their Christmas concerts at two military bases. In 2004, they gave a concert in the Cayman Islands.

== Recognition ==
The Collingsworth Family received the 2007 Harmony Award in the New Artist of the Year category from the Southern Gospel Music Guild. Their album The Best of The Collingsworth Family – Volume 1 was nominated for Best Roots Gospel Album in the 2018 Grammy Awards.

== Discography ==
=== Albums ===
- ”Classics and Hymns” (July 2024)
- "Just Sing!" (November 2021)
- "Worship From Home" (August 2020)
- "A True Family Christmas" (October 2019)
- "Mercy and Love" (Sept 2018)
- "Brooklyn & Courtney" (January 2017)
- "The Collingsworth Family Presents Brooklyn & Courtney"(Nov 2016)
- "The Best of the Collingsworth Family Vol 1"(Sept 2016)
- "The Best of the Collingsworth Family Vol 2"(Sept 2016)
- "That Day Is Coming"(Sept 2015)
- "Majestic" (Sept 2015)
- "The Lord is Good"(Sept 2013)
- "Hymns From Home"(Sept 2013)
- "Feels Like Christmas" (Sept 2012)
- "Part of the Family"(Sept 2011)
- "Fear Not Tomorrow"(Sept 2010)
- "A Decade of Memories"(September 2010)
- "Simply Christmas" (Oct 2009)
- "The Answer" (September 2009)
- "Then and Now" (September 2009)
- "Your Ticket to Music Hall"(August 2008)
- "Kim Collingsworth, Personal"(August 2008)
- "We Still Believe"(May 2007)
- "Sunday Morning Ivories, Volume 2"(Sept 2006)
- "God Is Faithful"(September 2005)
- "Christmas in Kosovo"(September 2004)
- "Strength for the Journey"(November 2003)
- "I’m Too Far"(April 2002)
- "Silver & Ivory (Instrumental)"(April 2001)
- "Sunday Morning Ivories"(Nov 2000)
- "Lifting Our Voices"(April 2000)

=== Videos ===
- "That Day Is Coming"(Sept 2017)
- "Majestic" (Sept 2014)
- "We Will Serve the Lord"(Sept 2014)
- "Hymns from Home"(Sept 2013)
- "Feels Like Christmas" (Sept 2012)
- "Part of the Family"(Sept 2012)
- "Fear Not Tomorrow"(Sept 2010)
- "A Decade of Memories"(September 2010)
- "Kim Controlling ‘PERSONAL’"(August 2008)
- "Your Ticket to Music Hall"(August 2008)
- "A Night to Remember" (September 2006)
- "We Have Met to Worship"(September 2004)
- "Christmas in Kosovo"(September 2004)
- "One Special Evening"(November 2002)

Top 10 Songs

- Awesome Power of Prayer #9
- Mercy and Love #8
- What The Bible Says #6
- How Great His Love For Me #9
- Just Another Rainy Day #4

== Awards and nominations ==
=== Grammy Awards ===
Year	Award	Result
2018	Best Roots Gospel Album (“Best of CFam, VOl.1”)	Nominated

=== GMA Dove Awards ===
Year	Award	Result
2012	Long Form Music Video	Won

=== Singing News Fan Awards ===
2018	Mixed Group of the Year	Won
2018	Musician of the Year (Kim)	Won
2017	Mixed Group of the Year	Won
2017	Musician of the Year (Kim)	Won
2016	Mixed Group of the Year	Won
2016	Musician of the Year (Kim)	Won
2015	Mixed Group of the Year	Won
2015	Musician of the Year (Kim)	Won
2014	Mixed Group of the Year	Won
2014	Musician of the Year (Kim)	Won
2013	Mixed Group of the Year	Won
2013	Young Artist of the Year (Olivia)	Won
2012	Mixed Group of the Year	Won
2012	Young Artist of the Year (Phillip Jr)	Won
2011	Young Artist of the Year (Courtney)	Won
2011	Horizon Individual of the Year (Courtney)	Won
2010	Young Artist of the Year (Brooklyn)	Won

=== NQC Music Awards ===
Year	Award	Result
2013	Musician of the Year (Kim)	Won
2013	Mixed Group of the Year	Won
2013	Musician of the Year (Kim)	Won
2013	Mixed Group of the Year	Won

=== Ovation Awards ===
Year	Award	Result
2009	Musician of the Year (Kim)	Won
2009	Special Project of the Year	Won
2006	Musician of the Year (Kim)	Won
2006	Breakthrough Artist of the Year	Won

=== Harmony Awards ===
Year	Award	Result
2007	New Artist of the Year	Won
