= Claude Ely =

American singer-songwriter and preacher

- Born: Claude Daniel Ely; July 21, 1922; Lee County, Virginia, U.S.
- Origin: Lee County, Virginia, US
- Died: May 7, 1978 (aged 55) Newport, Kentucky, U.S.
- Genres: Appalachian, Christian
- Occupation: Singer-songwriter
- Instrument(s): Guitar, voice
- Years active: 1934–1978

"Brother" Claude Ely (July 22, 1922 – May 7, 1978) was an American Appalachian religious singer-songwriter and a Holiness Pentecostal preacher.

== Early life ==
Brother Claude Daniel Ely, coined as the King Recording Label's "Gospel Ranger" of the Appalachian Mountains, was born in Pucketts Creek, Virginia. He was the first Holiness Pentecostal recording artist to be signed to a major recording label for strictly sacred music and songs.

== Rise to fame as a musician ==
Receiving fame for his song "There Ain’t No Grave (Gonna Hold My Body Down)", Ely's musical and spiritual style has influenced both secular and sacred music enthusiasts. Although Bozie Sturdivant was the first to record Ely's tune in 1941 with the help of the US Library of Congress' field recordings, Ely had written the song in 1934. King Records of Cincinnati helped Ely copyright the song in 1953. Many Hollywood entertainers and musical artists have acknowledged their admiration and fascination for Ely. Often music historians attest that other musical artists cite Ely as having been a positive influence on their works as well. Elvis' mother Gladys brought Elvis Presley to Ely's tent revivals. Artists recording Ely's songs include Elvis Presley and Johnny Cash. Robert Duvall's self-produced movie entitled The Apostle also integrated Ely's music on its soundtrack.

== Ministry ==
Ely pastored various churches in Kentucky, Virginia and the Cincinnati, Ohio area. Ely also hosted a radio program entitled The Gospel Ranger Show, which aired across the southeastern portion of the United States. He continued to be admired in the Appalachian mountains after his death.

== Legacy ==
Ely's great nephew Macel Ely II wrote an official biography on Ely's life. The book is based upon oral history ascertained from over 1,000 personal interviews Dr. Ely conducted with musical artists, ministers, and Appalachian residents who remembered the singer/preacher. The book is a "set" consisting of the earlier mentioned book and a music CD. The set, entitled Ain't No Grave: The Life & Legacy of Brother Claude Ely, was released in 2010 by Dust-to-Digital out of Atlanta, Georgia.

American VI: Ain't No Grave is a posthumous album by Johnny Cash. It was released on February 23, 2010, three days before what would have been Cash's 78th birthday, using Ely's song "Ain't No Grave" as the title track.

Eddie Dean, writer for The Washington Post, stated:

...and Holiness preachers such as Brother Claude Ely rave on like renegade rockabilly cats ... You have Brother Claude Ely doing radio broadcasts that sound like a tent revival ... I think his material is as strong as anything Sun Studio did. Even the wildest rockabilly rarely reached the unhinged delirium of "There Ain't No Grave Gonna Hold My Body Down," ... A Holiness preacher from Kentucky, Ely was a faith healer and a terrific guitarist, judging from the ferocious rockabilly rhythms on "Grave," a country hit in 1953. Ely and many others ... foreshadow the rock-and-soul explosion, when church-reared performers such as Ray Charles and Aretha Franklin fused sanctified and secular style to revolutionize pop music.

Dana Jennings, editor for The New York Times, wrote:

It's sanctified singing like Ely's that we hear echoes of in Elvis and Little Richard, in James Brown and especially in Jerry Lee Lewis ... Most musicians were merely called by fame, by the Opry. Brother Claude Ely had been called by God.
