= Raise a Hallelujah =

2019 single by Bethel Music, Jonathan David Helser and Melissa Helser

Single by Bethel Music, Jonathan David Helser and Melissa Helser

from the album Victory
- Released: March 8, 2019
- Recorded: 2018
- Genre: Contemporary worship music
- Length: 7:51; 4:04 (studio)
- Label: Bethel Music
- Songwriters: Jake Stevens; Jonathan David Helser; Melissa Helser; Molly Skaggs
- Producer: Ed Cash

Bethel Music singles chronology
"Stand in Your Love" (2018)	"Raise a Hallelujah" (2019)	"Alabaster Heart" (2019)

Jonathan David & Melissa Helser singles chronology
"You Came (Lazarus)" (2017)	"Raise a Hallelujah" (2019)	"I Believe" (2022)

Music videos
- "Raise a Hallelujah" (Acoustic) on YouTube
- "Raise a Hallelujah" (Live) on YouTube
- "Raise a Hallelujah" (Lyrics) on YouTube

Audio sample
- "Raise a Hallelujah": file; help

"Raise a Hallelujah" is a song by Bethel Music, Jonathan David Helser and Melissa Helser, which was released as the second single from Bethel Music's eleventh live album, Victory (2019), on March 8, 2019. The song was written by Jake Stevens, Jonathan David Helser, Melissa Helser and Molly Skaggs. Ed Cash handled the production of the single.

"Raise a Hallelujah" is Bethel Music's as well as Jonathan and Melissa Helser's first single to breakthrough to the top ten of the US Hot Christian Songs chart, peaking at No. 2. The song became their first No. 1 entry on the Christian Airplay chart, and also charted on the US Bubbling Under Hot 100 at No. 17, becoming the highest-charting single for all three acts. The song was nominated for Worship Recorded Song of the Year at the 50th Annual GMA Dove Awards.

== Background ==
"Raise a Hallelujah" was initially released by Bethel Music on January 4, 2019, as one of four promotional singles from Victory (2019), in the lead-up to its release which was slated for January 25, 2019. The song was born out of a spontaneous moment in worship and prayer as the Helsers processed and responded to the news that Jaxon Taylor, the son of Bethel Music chief executive officer Joel Taylor, had contracted Hemolytic-uremic syndrome (HUS) which had been caused by an E. coli infection, and was in a life-threatening situation. Joel Taylor, in an interview with Faithwire, shared that Jonathan David Helser had then recorded what was an almost complete song and sent it to him, which he then played over Jaxon, who was lying in a hospital bed, from his phone repeatedly. Over time, Jaxon fully recovered from the sickness. Joel Taylor also indicated in his interview with Faithwire that the song was never planned to be on the album, calling the song's inclusion on the album a "last minute decision," and noted that it was being prepared for a nationwide radio debut.

The studio-recorded version of "Raise a Hallelujah" was released in digital format on March 8, 2019. The song then impacted Christian radio in the United States on March 15, 2019.

== Composition ==
"Raise a Hallelujah" is composed in the key of D♭ with a moderate rock tempo of 82 beats per minute and a musical time signature of 4/4. The vocal range of the singers spans from A♭_{3} to B♭_{4}.

== Commercial performance ==
Following the song's release as a promotional single, "Raise a Hallelujah" made its debut at No. 28 on the US Hot Christian Songs chart dated January 19, 2019, as published by Billboard. It concurrently debuted on the Christian Digital Song Sales chart at No. 4 that same week. Billboard reported that "Raise a Hallelujah" broke through the top ten of the Hot Christian Songs chart, debuting at No. 8 because of substantial gains in radio airplay, the feat being achieved after spending 19 weeks on the chart. The song went on to peak at No. 2 on Hot Christian Songs. "Raise a Hallelujah" became the first No. 1 Christian Airplay chart entry for Bethel Music, Jonathan David Helser and Melissa Helser, reaching the peak on the August 24-dated chart.

== Music videos ==
Bethel Music released the live music video of "Raise a Hallelujah" with Jonathan David Helser and Melissa Helser leading the song during a worship service at Bethel Church through their YouTube channel on January 3, 2019. Melissa Helser revealed in an Instagram post that it was the first time they sang the song to Jaxon since recovering and being released from the hospital. The lyric video of the song was released on January 24, 2019, on YouTube by Bethel Music. An acoustic performance video shot on location in North Carolina, with the Helsers singing was published on YouTube on September 4, 2019.

== Accolades ==
Awards
Year	Organization	Award	Result	Ref.
2019	GMA Dove Awards	Worship Recorded Song of the Year	Nominated	
2020	We Love Christian Music Awards	Worship Song of the Year	Won	
2020	Billboard Music Awards	Top Christian Song	Nominated	

== Track listing ==
"Raise a Hallelujah" (Studio Version)
No.	Title	Writer(s)	Length
1.	"Raise a Hallelujah" (Studio Version)	Jake Stevens; Jonathan David Helser; Melissa Helser; Molly Skaggs	4:04

== Charts ==
=== Weekly charts ===
Chart (2019)	Peak position
US Bubbling Under Hot 100 (Billboard)	17
US Hot Christian Songs (Billboard)	2
US Digital Song Sales (Billboard)	47

=== Year-end charts ===
Chart (2019)	Position
US Christian Songs (Billboard)	3
US Christian Airplay (Billboard)	5
US Christian AC (Billboard)	3
Chart (2020)	Position
US Christian Digital Song Sales (Billboard)	10
US Christian Streaming Songs (Billboard)	10

== Certifications ==
Region	Certification	Certified units/sales
New Zealand (RMNZ)	Platinum	30,000^{‡}
United States (RIAA)	Gold	500,000^{‡}
^{‡} Sales+streaming figures based on certification alone.

== Cover versions ==
- Nevada-based CCM band I Am They released an acoustic performance video of the song.
- American gospel artist Anthony Evans released an R&B-infused version of the song on his eighth studio album, Altared (2019).
- British worship band New Wine Worship released a live cover of the song on their album, This Is Love (2019).
- Passion released a live cover featuring Brett Younker as a promotional single from the album, Roar (Live From Passion 2020) (2020).

== Release history ==
Region	Date	Format	Label	Ref.
Various	March 8, 2019	Digital download; streaming	Bethel Music	
United States	March 15, 2019	Christian hot adult contemporary radio; Christian contemporary hit radio	Bethel Music	
