= Hunter G. K. Thompson =

American Christian musician (born 1991)

- Born: Hunter Gabriel Kansas Thompson; May 29, 1991 (age 35); Saint Paul, Minnesota
- Origin: Redding, California
- Genres: CCM, Christian rock, Christian alternative rock, indie pop, indie rock, worship
- Occupations: Singer, songwriter
- Instrument: Vocals
- Years active: 2013–present
- Label: Bethel

Hunter Gabriel Kansas Thompson (born May 29, 1991) is an American Christian musician. His first release was with Bethel Music in 2013, Gabriel Kansas EP. The second EP, Swan Song, was released in 2014 by Bethel Music. This album was his breakthrough release upon the Billboard magazine Christian Albums and Heatseekers Albums charts. In 2019, he released three singles and a full-length record, "No Books About Me" with Watershed Music Group.

== Early life ==
Thompson was born on May 29, 1991, in Saint Paul, Minnesota to Paul Allen Thompson and Kathryn (Kansas) Thompson. He currently is based out of Redding, California, and attends worship services as a worship leader at Bethel Church.

== Music career ==
Thompson's music career commenced in 2012 when he recorded his song "My Dear" as part of Bethel Music's album The Loft Sessions. His solo career then took off with the EP, Gabriel Kansas, which was released February 22, 2013, by Bethel Music. His second EP, Swan Song, was released on December 2, 2014, by Bethel Music. The EP was his breakthrough release upon the Billboard magazine charts, where it placed on the Christian Albums chart at No. 35 and on the Heatseekers Albums chart at No. 10.

== Discography ==
=== EPs ===
List of EPs, with selected chart positions
Title	Album details	Peak chart positions	
Title	Album details	US Christ	US Heat
Gabriel Kansas	Released: February 22, 2013; Label: Bethel; Format: CD, digital download	—	—
Swan Song	Released: December 2, 2014; Label: Bethel; Format: CD, digital download	35	10
