= Bethel Music =

American music label

- Origin: Redding, California, U.S.
- Genre: Contemporary worship music
- Years active: 2001–present
- Labels: Bethel Music, Capitol Christian Music Group
- Members: Brian Johnson; Jenn Johnson; Kristene DiMarco; Paul McClure; Hannah McClure; Emmy Rose; Bethany Wohrle; Josh Baldwin; David Funk; John Wilds; Zahriya Zachary; Noah Paul Harrison; Hannah Waters; Garret Serban; Kate Serban; Jordan Colle; Aubree Archibeck; Joel Barber
- Past members: Cory Asbury; Brandon Lake; Dante Bowe; Sean Feucht; Jeremy Riddle; Leeland; Melissa Helser; Jonathan David Helser; Steffany Gretzinger; Amanda Cook; Kalley Heiligenthal; Matt Stinton; Hunter G.K. Thompson; William Matthews; Morgan Faleolo; Edward Rivera
- Website: bethelmusic.com

Bethel Music is an American Christian music label and publishing group. Beginning as a local music ministry, it became a global outreach collective of songwriters and musicians.

== History ==
Between 2009 and 2013, Bethel Music developed a record label and publishing company featuring songwriters and worship leaders from Bethel Church, a non-denominational megachurch in Redding, California.

In February 2015, Bethel Music launched the "Bethel Music Artist Collective", an expansion of their group of locally based artists to include Josh Baldwin and Jonathan and Melissa Helser from another ministry which is based in North Carolina. In June of the same year, Bethel added Christian artist Cory Asbury, formerly of the International House of Prayer. In September 2015, Bethel announced that Leeland was joining Bethel's Artist Collective.

== Past and current members ==
Members of Bethel Music from 2009 to present

- Josh Baldwin
- Dante Bowe
- Amanda Cook
- Kristene DiMarco
- Morgan Faleolo
- Sean Feucht
- David Funk
- Steffany Gretzinger
- Kalley Heiligenthal
- Melissa Helser
- Brian Johnson
- Jenn Johnson
- Brandon Lake
- Leeland
- William Matthews
- Paul and Hannah McClure
- Noah Paul Harrison
- Jeremy Riddle
- Edward Rivera
- Emmy Rose
- Matt Stinton
- Hunter G.K. Thompson
- John Wilds
- Bethany Wohrle
- Zahriya Zachary
- Joel Barber
- Aubree Archibeck

== Production history ==
=== Albums ===
Albums that have been produced by Bethel Music include:

- Undone (Brian & Jenn Johnson with Leah Märi) (2001)
- The Awakening (Live) – Rerelease (Jonathan David and Melissa Helser) (2005)
- We Believe (Brian & Jenn Johnson) (2006)
- The Reward (Extended Versions) – Rerelease (Jonathan David and Melissa Helser) (2008)
- Walk Through the Walls (Extended Versions) – Rerelease (Jonathan David & Melissa Helser) (2008)
- All I Have Needed (Leah Märi) (2010)
- Here Is Love (2010)
- Love Came Down - Live Acoustic Worship in the Studio (Brian Johnson) (2010)
- "Long Story Short – Rerelease" (Jonathan David and Melissa Helser) (2011)
- Be Lifted High (2011)
- Hope's Anthem – Rerelease (William Matthews) (2011)
- The Loft Sessions (2012)
- For the Sake of the World (2012)
- Without Words (2013)
- Tides (2013)
- Discover Bethel Music (2013)
- Tides Live (2014)
- The Undoing (Steffany Gretzinger) (2014)
- Endless Ocean, Bottomless Sea (Extended Versions) – Rerelease (Jonathan David & Melissa Helser) (2014)
- On the Shores – Rerelease (Jonathan David & Melissa Helser) (2014)
- You Make Me Brave (2014)
- We Will Not Be Shaken (2015)
- Without Words: Synesthesia (2015)
- Brave New World (Amanda Cook) (2015)
- Come Alive (Bethel Music Kids) (2015)
- Have It All (2016)
- Invisible (Leeland) (2016)
- Beautiful Surrender (Jonathan David & Melissa Helser) (2016)
- Bethel Music Kids Christmas Party (Bethel Music Kids) (2016)
- After All These Years (Brian & Jenn Johnson) (2017)
- Starlight (2017)
- The War Is Over (Josh Baldwin) (2017)
- After All These Years (Instrumental) (Brian & Jenn Johnson) (2017)
- Where His Light Was (Kristene DiMarco) (2017)
- More (Jeremy Riddle) (2017)
- Reckless Love (Cory Asbury) (2018)
- Blackout (Steffany Gretzinger) (2018)
- Bright Ones (Bright Ones) (2018)
- Moments: Mighty Sound (2018)
- Wild (Sean Feucht) (2018)
- Victory (2019)
- Bethel Music en Español (2019)
- House on a Hill (Amanda Lindsey Cook) (2019)
- The Way Home (The McClures) (2019)
- Without Words: Genesis (2019)
- Peace (2020)
- Live at Church (Josh Baldwin) (2020)
- Revival's in the Air (2020)
- To Love a Fool (Cory Asbury) (2020)
- House of Miracles (Brandon Lake) (2020)
- Evidence (Josh Baldwin) (2020)
- Christmas Morning (The McClures) (2020)
- Almond Eyes (Brandon Lake) (2021)
- Circles (Dante Bowe) (2021)
- Homecoming (2021)
- Homecoming (Español) (2021)
- Peace, Vol. II (2021)
- "The Land I'm Livin' In" (Jonathan David and Melissa Helser) (2022)
- Kingdom Come (Rebecca St. James) (2022)
- The Field (Kristene DiMarco) (2022)
- Simple (2022)
- Where the Glory Is (Josh Baldwin) (2022)
- Come Up Here (2023)
- Narrow Road — Acoustic Sessions (Josh Baldwin) (2023)
- Beauty (David Funk) (2023)
- Surrounded By Holy (Zahriya Zachary) (2023)
- Made For More (Live) (Josh Baldwin) (2024)
- Moments: Wait (Live) (2024)
- We Must Respond (Live) (2025) (Note: released under the Heritage Music Group label)

=== Singles ===
- "Come to Me" (Jenn Johnson) (2011)
- "Chasing You" (Jenn Johnson) (2013)
- "You Make Me Brave" (Amanda Cook) (2014)
- "It is Well" (Kristene DiMarco) (2015)
- "No Longer Slaves" (Jonathan David & Melissa Helser) (2015)
- "Have It All" (Brian Johnson) (2016)
- "Take Courage" (Kristene DiMarco) (2017)
- "Living Hope" (Bethany Worhle) (2018)
- "Stand in Your Love" (Josh Baldwin) (2018)
- "Raise a Hallelujah" (Jonathan David Helser and Melissa Helser) (2019)
- "Alabaster Heart" (Kalley) (2019)
- "Goodness of God" (Jenn Johnson) (2019)
- "God of Revival" (Brian Johnson and Jenn Johnson) (2020)
- "We Praise You" (Brandon Lake) (2020)
- "Egypt" (Cory Asbury) (2020)
- "Touch of Heaven" / "Alabaster Heart" (David Funk) (2021)
- "Too Good To Not Believe" (Brandon Lake) (2021)
- "Homecoming" (Cory Asbury and Gable Price) (2021)

=== Releases and reception ===
Bethel Music's live album, We Will Not Be Shaken was produced by Bobby Strand and Chris Greely, and introduces 11 original songs led by the Bethel Music Artist Collective, including Brian Johnson, Jenn Johnson, Hunter Thompson, Amanda Cook and Matt Stinton, as well as debut artists Kalley Heiligenthal, Hannah McClure, Paul McClure, Jonathan David Helser and Melissa Helser. We Will Not Be Shaken was intended as a catalyst for other worship communities to remain steadfast in their faith no matter what the circumstances. The title track was inspired in a spontaneous moment of worship during a Sunday service and highlights God's enduring promises during times of trouble.

CCM Magazine also lauded the album, saying that there "is quite a bit of buzz surrounding the anticipated release from Bethel Music...and it's all warranted. This is an album that simply soars above the rest... Every track holds a different aspect of beauty...flawless." Christian Review Magazine gave it a five-star review saying the album is an "out-and-out worship release on which each track contains lyrics that praise and glorify God, and point toward His faithfulness, love and grace." NewReleaseTuesday.com for its part loves the "anointed lyrics that are both emotionally stirring and grounded in truth alongside musical atmospheres that quiet the soul while simultaneously clearing space for God to speak."

You Make Me Brave was recorded live at Redding's Civic Auditorium during Bethel Church's women's conference in the summer of 2013. The album features female worship leaders Jenn Johnson, Kari Jobe, Amanda Cook, Kristene DiMarco and more. According to The Church Collective, it is "classic Bethel", with 3 of the 12 tracks recorded during spontaneous moments of worship. Their reviewer goes on to say that "the worship leaders from Bethel seriously outdo themselves with their musical influence, heavy synth, and wisely put-together arrangements of songs." Produced by Gabriel Solomon Wilson & Daniel Mackenzie.

On March 11, Bethel Music released Have It All, a live album recorded at Bethel Church on weekend services. The album features 14 songs led by Brian & Jenn Johnson, Jeremy Riddle, Steffany Gretzinger, Amanda Cook, William Matthews, Jonathan Helser & more. The album was birthed as a "declaration of the faith that becomes proved in us when we entrust our every moment into our Father's hands – the hands that carefully formed us and now lead us into fullness of life." The album was nominated for Worship Album of the Year and Recorded Music Packaging Award at the 2016 GMA Dove Awards, but won neither.

Starlight is the first album recorded live on tour, a follow-up to You Make Me Brave (2014). The album is made up of 14 songs sung by Jenn Johnson, Steffany Gretzinger, Amanda Cook, Kristene DiMarco, Kalley Heiligenthal, Melissa Helser, Hannah McClure, and Francesca Battistelli. The message of the album is that, "like stars placed in the universe, no distance separates us from Him."

Moments: Mighty Sound is the first spontaneous album recorded live at WorshipU on Campus and included worship leaders Brian & Jenn Johnson, Steffany Gretzinger, Kalley Heiligenthal, Melissa Helser, Molly Skaggs, Amanda Cook, Jeremy Riddle, Leeland Mooring, Reuben Morgan, Brittany Mondesir, and Paul McClure.

Victory was recorded live at Bethel Church. The 14-track album was the start of the promotional Victory Tour in which the Bethel Music Collective traveled across the United States. The album was recorded during several hardships faced by the Bethel community, including the near death of the two-year-old son of Bethel Music's CEO Joel Taylor and the Carr Fire near Redding, California and the surrounding areas.

=== Events and tours ===
Bethel Music regularly tours both in the U.S. and internationally. Artists from the Bethel Music family visited South Africa for the first time in March 2015 and led evenings of worship in Johannesburg, Pretoria, Durban, Cape Town and Port Elizabeth.

In October 2016, Bethel artists Brian and Jenn Johnson, Amanda Cook, Steffany Gretzinger, Jonathan and Melissa Helser, Kalley Heiligenthal, Kristene DiMarco, Paul and Hannah McClure, and Josh Baldwin embarked on a two-week tour to record a live album with guest worship leader Francesca Battistelli. On March 1, 2017, it was announced that the album would be titled Starlight, with pre-orders beginning on March 17 and the official release of the album to be on April 7.

=== Achievements ===
Bethel Music's songs were among the most played contemporary worship music in American churches in 2019 and their albums have reached the Billboard 200 multiple times. Bethel Music have many songs with tens of millions of views on YouTube, and five with over 100 million views as of 2025. Their songs and albums have been among the most streamed and downloaded Christian music on Spotify and iTunes.

== Awards and nominations ==
=== Billboard Music Awards ===
Year	Nominee / work	Award	Result	Ref.
2020	Victory	Top Christian Album	Nominated	
2020	"Raise a Hallelujah"	Top Christian Song	Nominated	
2021	Peace	Top Christian Album	Nominated	

=== GMA Dove Awards ===
Year	Nominee / work	Award	Result
2015	We Will Not Be Shaken	Worship Album of the Year	Nominated
2016	"No Longer Slaves"	Song of the Year	Nominated
2016	"No Longer Slaves"	Worship Song of the Year	Won
2016	Have It All	Worship Album of the Year	Nominated
2016	Have It All	Recorded Music Packaging of the Year	Nominated
2016	Without Words: Synesthesia	Instrumental Album of the Year	Won
2017	"The Lion and the Lamb"	Song of the Year	Nominated
2017	"The Lion and the Lamb"	Worship Song of the Year	Nominated
2017	"Ever Be"	Worship Song of the Year	Nominated
2019	"Raise a Hallelujah"	Worship Recorded Song of the Year	Nominated
2019	Victory	Worship Album of the Year	Nominated
2019	Victory	Recorded Music Packaging of the Year	Nominated
2020	"Goodness of God"	Worship Recorded Song of the Year	Nominated
2020	Peace	Worship Album of the Year	Nominated
2020	Without Words: Genesis	Instrumental Album of the Year	Nominated
2021	Revival's in the Air	Worship Album of the Year	Nominated
2021	Revival's in the Air	Recorded Music Packaging of the Year	Nominated
2022	"You're Gonna Be OK" (featuring Jenn Johnson)	Inspirational Recorded Song of the Year	Nominated
2022	Homecoming	Worship Album of the Year	Nominated
2023	"Goodness of God"	Song of the Year	Won
2023	Come Up Here	Worship Album of the Year	Nominated
2023	Come Up Here	Long Form Video of the Year	Won
2025	We Must Respond (Live)	Worship Album of the Year	Nominated
2026	We Must Respond (Live)	Worship Album of the Year	Pending
