= Jonathan David & Melissa Helser =

American Christian music duo

- Origin: Sophia, North Carolina, U.S.
- Genre: Worship
- Years active: 2013–present
- Label: Bethel
- Members: Jonathan David Helser (September 6, 1978); Melissa Phillips Helser (February 19, 1980)
- Website: jonathanhelser.com

Jonathan David & Melissa Helser are an American Christian music husband and wife duo from Sophia, North Carolina, who started their music recording careers together in 2013. They have released three studio albums with Bethel Music, Endless Ocean, Bottomless Sea (2014), On the Shores (2015) and Beautiful Surrender (2016). Their last album, Beautiful Surrender, was their breakthrough release upon the Billboard magazine charts.

== Music history ==
The husband and wife duo commenced their recording careers together in 2013, with releasing their first studio album, Endless Ocean, Bottomless Sea, on November 24, 2014, using the Bethel Music recording label. They released, On the Shores, with Bethel Music, on June 9, 2015. Their third studio album, Beautiful Surrender, was released on September 30, 2016, from Bethel Music. This album was their breakthrough release on the Billboard (magazine) charts, where it peaked on The Billboard 200 at No. 54, Christian Albums at No. 1, and Canadian Albums at No. 67.

== Discography ==
=== Studio albums ===
List of studio albums, with selected chart positions
Title	Album details	Peak chart positions		
Title	Album details	US	US Chr	CAN
The Reward	Released: April 11, 2008; Label: Independent; Format: CD, download	—	—	—
Walk Through the Walls	Released: November 14, 2008; Label: Independent; Format: CD, download	—	—	—
Long Story Short	Released: March 18, 2011; Label: Independent; Format: CD, download	—	—	—
On the Shores	Released: October 19, 2012/June 9, 2015; Label: Independent/Bethel; Format: CD, download	—	—	—
Beautiful Surrender	Released: September 30, 2016; Label: Bethel; Format: CD, download	54	1	67
"—" denotes a recording that did not chart

=== Live albums ===
List of live albums
Title	Album details
The Awakening	Released: October 5, 2005; Label: Independent; Format: Digital download, streaming
The Land I'm Livin' In	Released: March 4, 2022; Label: Bethel; Format: Digital download, streaming

=== EPs ===
List of extended plays
Title	Album details
The Land I'm Livin' In — Day One	Released: January 21, 2022; Label: Bethel; Format: Digital download, streaming
The Land I'm Livin' In — Day Two	Released: February 11, 2022; Label: Bethel; Format: Digital download, streaming
The Land I'm Livin' In — Day Three	Released: March 4, 2022; Label: Bethel; Format: Digital download, streaming

=== Singles ===
List of singles and peak chart positions
Title	Year	Chart positions				Certifications	Album
Title	Year	US Bubb.	US Christ	US Christ Air.	US Christ AC	Certifications	Album
"No Longer Slaves" (with Bethel Music)	2015	—	19	20	15	RIAA: Gold	We Will Not Be Shaken
"You Came (Lazarus)"	2017	—	42	34	—		Beautiful Surrender
"Raise a Hallelujah" (with Bethel Music)	2019	17	2	1	1	RIAA: Gold	Victory
"I Believe"	2022	—	—	38	—		The Land I'm Livin' In
"—" denotes a recording that did not chart
