= Bethel Music discography =

Discography of American Christian Worship group, Bethel Music

- Studio albums: 4
- EPs: 1
- Live albums: 14
- Compilation albums: 1
- Singles: 10
- Music videos: 74
- Remix albums: 4
- Lyric videos: 65

The discography of Bethel Music, an American Christian worship collective based in Redding, California, comprises fourteen live albums, 3 studio albums, one extended play, one compilation album, four instrumental remix albums, ten singles as well as seventy-four music videos and sixty-five lyric videos.

Bethel made its debut in 2010 with Here Is Love, their first live album, which also featured Jesus Culture artists, was released alongside Integrity Music. They immediately rose to prominence with their second live LP Be Lifted High in 2011, which contained popular worship anthems such as "Love Came Down" and "One Thing Remains", and peaked at No. 7 on Billboard's Christian Albums Chart in the United States. In early 2012, Bethel Music released The Loft Sessions, the collective's third live album, which reached No. 3 on Christian Albums Chart, concurrently making Bethel Music's debut on the all-genre Billboard 200 Chart at No. 44. Later on in the year, For the Sake of the World was released in October. The album was the group's third Top 10 appearance on Billboard's Christian Albums Chart, peaking at No. 2.

In 2013, Bethel released three albums: Without Words, Tides and Discover Bethel Music. Released in March alongside Integrity Music, Without Words was Bethel's first instrumental remix album. When the Official Charts Company launched the Official Christian & Gospel Albums Chart for the identifying the top twenty bestselling Christian and Gospel releases in the United Kingdom in March 2013, Bethel made its debut on the chart with two releases in the top ten: Without Words at No. 2 and For the Sake of the World at No. 6. The release of Tides, the collective's first studio album, followed in early September, becoming Bethel's first No. 1 on the Christian Albums Chart in the United States, and on the Official Christian & Gospel Albums Chart in the United Kingdom whilst making Bethel's debut on the all-genre Official Albums Chart at No. 79. Tides Live was released in early 2014, repeating the feat of topping the Christian Albums Chart in the US and the UK's Official Christian & Gospel Albums Chart.

In April 2014, You Make Me Brave was released, becoming Bethel's first Top 10 entry on the Billboard 200, being the tenth best-selling album in the United States for the week ending May 10.

January 2015 saw the release of the collective's seventh live album, We Will Not Be Shaken, which, having sold nearly 30,000 copies in its debut retail week, became their third consecutive album to top both Christian music charts in the US and the UK, and the collective's first Top 10 entry on Billboard's Canadian Albums Chart and the Official New Zealand Music Chart, peaking at 9 in Canada for the week ending February 14, also being the tenth best-selling album in New Zealand at its peak. Without Words: Synesthesia, their second instrumental remix album, was released on the last day of July in the same year, becoming the collective's eighth Top 10 on Billboard's Christian Albums Chart peaking at No 2.

Bethel Music released Have It All in March 2016, its first live album to be recorded at Bethel Church since For the Sake of the World and their fourth album overall to be recorded at Bethel Church. Have It All started at No. 2 on the Billboard Christian Albums Chart in its opening week with 25,000 copies sold, peaking at No. 12 on the Billboard 200. The album also broke into the Top 10 of Australia's ARIA Top 100 Albums Chart at No. 8. Starlight was released on April 7, 2017, selling 20,000 equivalent album units in the week ending April 13, also rising to No. 1 on the Billboard Christian Albums chart dated April 29, 2017. Starlight made its debut on the ARIA Albums Chart at No. 15, becoming the fourth album by Bethel Music to enter Australia's Top 50 Albums Chart. Bethel went on to release After All These Years (Instrumental), their third remix album, in July 2017, debuting at No. 43 on Billboard Christian Albums chart.

In May 2018, Bethel Music issued its first spontaneous worship album, Moments: Mighty Sound, recorded live at Bethel Church, with 5,000 equivalent album units being sold in the week ending May 17, 2018 to debut at number 2 on Billboard Christian Albums and 168 on Billboard 200 charts.

== Albums ==
=== Studio albums ===
List of albums, with selected chart positions
Title	Album details	Peak chart positions							Sales
Title	Album details	US	US Christ.	US Indie	CAN	NOR	UK	UK C&G	Sales
Tides	Released: September 3, 2013; Label: Bethel; Format: CD, download, streaming	30	1	4	25	16	79	1	US: 15,000
Peace	Released: April 10, 2020; Label: Bethel; Format: CD, digital download, streaming	85	2	10	—	—	—	3	US: 9,000
Homecoming (Español)	Released: October 29, 2021; Label: Bethel; Format: Digital Download, streaming	—	—	—	—	—	—	—	
Peace, Vol. II	Released: November 12, 2021; Label: Bethel; Format: Digital Download, streaming	—	32	—	—	—	—	—	
"—" denotes a recording that did not chart or was not released in that territory

=== Live albums ===
List of albums, with selected chart positions
Title	Album details	Peak chart positions										Sales
Title	Album details	US	US Christ.	AUS	BEL (FL)	CAN	NLD	NOR	NZ	SCO	UK	Sales
Here Is Love	Released: October 12, 2010; Label: Bethel / Integrity; Format: CD, download, streaming	—	—	—	—	—	—	—	—	—	—	
Be Lifted High	Released: February 17, 2011; Label: Bethel / Kingsway; Format: CD, download, streaming	—	7	—	—	—	—	—	—	—	—	
The Loft Sessions	Released: January 24, 2012; Label: Kingsway; Format: CD, download, streaming	44	3	—	—	—	—	—	—	—	— (Note: The Loft Sessions did not enter the UK Albums Chart, but peaked at number 97 on the UK Album Downloads Chart.)	
For the Sake of the World	Released: October 1, 2012; Label: Bethel / Kingsway; Format: CD, download, streaming	51	2	—	—	—	—	—	—	—	—	
Tides Live	Released: February 25, 2014; Label: Bethel; Format: CD, download, streaming	28	1	—	—	—	—	—	—	—	— (Note: Tides Live did not enter the UK Albums Chart, but peaked at number 48 on the UK Album Downloads Chart.)	
You Make Me Brave	Released: April 21, 2014; Label: Bethel; Format: CD, download, streaming	10	1	34	—	23	—	—	—	—	— (Note: You Make Me Brave did not enter the UK Albums Chart, but peaked at number 67 on the UK Album Downloads Chart.)	
We Will Not Be Shaken	Released: January 26, 2015; Label: Bethel; Format: CD, download, streaming	12	1	14	—	9	41	—	10	49	34	US: 30,000
Have It All	Released: March 11, 2016; Label: Bethel; Format: CD, download, streaming	12	2	8	187	11	50	16	11	37	34	US: 25,000
Starlight	Released: April 7, 2017; Label: Bethel; Format: CD, download, streaming	21	1	15	—	26	100	—	25	60	78	US: 20,000
Moments: Mighty Sound	Released: May 11, 2018; Label: Bethel; Format: CD, download, streaming	168	2	—	—	—	—	—	—	—	— (Note: Moments: Mighty Sound did not enter the UK Albums Chart, but peaked at number 60 on the UK Album Downloads Chart.)	US: 5,000
Victory	Released: January 25, 2019; Label: Bethel; Format: CD, digital download, streaming	56	2	23	—	77	162	—	—	41	— (Note: Victory did not enter the UK Albums Chart, but peaked at number 54 on the UK Albums Chart Update and number 48 on the UK Albums Sales Chart.)	
Bethel Music en Español	Released: February 15, 2019; Label: Bethel; Format: CD, digital download, streaming	—	—	—	—	—	—	—	—	—	—	
Revival's in the Air	Release: May 29, 2020; Label: Bethel; Format: CD, digital download, streaming	— (Note: Revival's in the Air did not enter the Billboard 200, but peaked at number 30 on the Top Album Sales Chart.)	2	—	—	—	—	—	—	—	— (Note: Revival's in the Air did not enter the UK Albums Chart, but peaked at number 55 on the UK Albums Sales Chart.)	
Homecoming	Released: September 24, 2021; Label: Bethel; Format: CD, digital download, streaming	— (Note: Homecoming did not enter the Billboard 200, but peaked at number 82 on the Top Album Sales Chart.)	3	—	—	—	—	—	—	—	—	
Simple	Released: September 23, 2022; Label: Bethel; Format: CD, digital download, streaming	—	23	—	—	—	—	—	—	—	—	
Come Up Here	Released: September 23, 2022; Label: Bethel; Format: CD, digital download, streaming	— (Note: Come Up Here did not enter the Billboard 200, but peaked at number 85 on the Top Current Album Sales.)	14	—	—	—	—	—	—	—	— (Note: Come Up Here did not enter the UK Albums Chart, but peaked at number 50 on the UK Album Downloads Chart.)	
We Must Respond	Released: January 10, 2025; Label: Bethel/Stem; Format: CD, digital download, streaming	—	10	—	—	—	—	—	—	—	— (Note: We Must Respond did not enter the UK Albums Chart, but peaked at number 43 on the UK Album Downloads Chart.)	
Songs for Easter	Released: March 20, 2026; Label: Bethel/Stem; Format: CD, digital download, streaming	—	8	—	—	—	—	—	—	—	—	
"—" denotes a recording that did not chart or was not released in that territory

=== Remix albums ===
List of albums, with selected chart positions
Title	Album details	Peak chart positions				Sales
Title	Album details	US	US Christ.	AUS	UK C&G	Sales
Without Words	Released: March 5, 2013; Label: Bethel / Integrity; Format: CD, download, streaming	106	10	—	2	
Without Words: Synesthesia	Released: July 31, 2015; Label: Bethel; Format: CD, download, streaming	112	2	60	—	US: 5,000
After All These Years (Instrumental)	Released: July 14, 2017; Label: Bethel; Format: CD, download, streaming	—	43	—	—	
Without Words: Genesis	Released: November 15, 2019; Label: Bethel	—	6	—	—	
"—" denotes a recording that did not chart or was not released in that territory

=== Compilation albums ===
- Discover Bethel Music (2013)

=== Extended plays ===
- Tides: The Streaming EP (2013)

== Singles ==
List of singles, with selected chart positions
Song	Year	Peak chart positions					Certifications	Album
Song	Year	US Bub.	US Christ. Songs	US Christ. Airplay	US Christ. Digital	US Christ. Stream.	Certifications	Album
"Come to Me" (with Jenn Johnson)	2011	—	—	—	14	—		The Loft Sessions
"Chasing You" (with Jenn Johnson)	2013	—	—	—	13	—		Tides
"You Make Me Brave" (with Amanda Cook)	2014	—	16	20	13	—	RIAA: Gold	You Make Me Brave
"It Is Well" (with Kristene DiMarco)	2015	—	27	31	21	19	RIAA: Platinum; RMNZ: Gold	You Make Me Brave
"No Longer Slaves" (featuring Jonathan David & Melissa Helser)	2015	—	19	20	7	20	RIAA: Platinum; RMNZ: Gold	We Will Not Be Shaken
"Have It All" (with Brian Johnson)	2016	—	—	—	—	—		Have It All
"Take Courage" (with Kristene DiMarco)	2017	—	36	34	20	—		Starlight
"Living Hope" (with Bethany Worhle)	2018	—	—	—	—	—		non-album single
"Stand in Your Love" (with Josh Baldwin)	2018	—	7	2	10	—	RIAA: Gold	Victory
"Raise a Hallelujah" (with Jonathan David & Melissa Helser)	2019	17	2	1	2	5	RIAA: Gold; RMNZ: Platinum	Victory
"Alabaster Heart" (with Kalley)	2019	—	32	—	19	—		Faultlines Vol. 1 (EP) (Note: Studio version.)
"Goodness of God" (with Jenn Johnson)	2019	—	15	20	14	22	RIAA: Gold; RMNZ: Gold	Victory
"God of Revival" (with Brian Johnson and Jenn Johnson)	2020	—	22	19	5	—		Revival's in the Air
"We Praise You" (with Brandon Lake)	2020	—	—	46	—	—		Revival's in the Air
"Egypt" (with Cory Asbury)	2020	—	37	—	8	—		Revival's in the Air
"Champion" (with Dante Bowe)	2020	—	28	—	20	—		Revival's in the Air
"Revival's in the Air" (with Melissa Helser)	2020	—	—	24	—	—		Revival's in the Air
"Touch of Heaven / Alabaster Heart" (with David Funk)	2021	—	—	—	—	—		Non-album single
"Too Good to Not Believe" (with Brandon Lake)	2021	—	19	14	7	—		Homecoming
"Church" (with UPPERROOM featuring Abbie Gamboa, Jenn Johnson, and Kristian Stanfill)	2025	—	28	—	—	—		We Must Respond (Live)
"Center" (with Abbie Gamboa)	2026	—	35	—	—	—		We Must Respond (Live)
"—" denotes a recording that did not chart

== Other charted songs ==
Song	Year	Peak positions		Certifications	Album
Song	Year	US Christ	US Christ Digital	Certifications	Album
"For the Sake of the World" (with Brian Johnson)	2012	—	49		For the Sake of the World
"We Will Not Be Shaken" (with Brian Johnson)	2015	28	32		We Will Not Be Shaken
"Jesus, We Love You " (with Paul McClure)	2015	37	45		We Will Not Be Shaken
"Ever Be" (with Kalley Heiligenthal)	2015	22	8	RIAA: Gold	We Will Not Be Shaken
"You Don't Miss a Thing" (with Amanda Cook)	2015	35	38		We Will Not Be Shaken
"Nearness" (with Jenn Johnson)	2015	48	—		We Will Not Be Shaken
"You Are My One Thing" (with Hannah McClure)	2015	50	—		We Will Not Be Shaken
"In Over My Head (Crash Over Me)" (with Jenn Johnson)	2015	26	11		We Will Not Be Shaken
"Shine on Us" (with William Matthews)	2016	28	12		Have It All
"Pieces" (with Steffany Gretzinger)	2016	38	37		Have It All
"Lion and the Lamb" (with Leeland)	2016	44	42		Have It All
"Mercy" (with Amanda Cook)	2016	47	49		Have It All
"Spirit Move" (with Kalley Heiligenthal)	2016	36	35		Have It All
"Glory to Glory" (with William Matthews)	2016	37	34		Have It All
"Starlight" (with Amanda Cook)	2017	35	18		Starlight
"Extravagant" (with Steffany Gretzinger and Amanda Cook)	2017	30	23		Starlight
"King of My Heart" (with Steffany Gretzinger and Jeremy Riddle)	2017	29	4	RMNZ: Gold	Starlight
"Reckless Love (Spontaneous)" (with Steffany Gretzinger)	2018	38	—		Moments: Mighty Sound
"Ain't No Grave" (with Molly Skaggs)	2019	17	3		Victory
"Victory is Yours" (with Bethany Wohrle)	2019	33	—		Victory
"Stand in Your Love (Recorded Live)"	2019	36	—		Victory
"Peace" (with We The Kingdom)	2020	48	25		Peace
"Come Out of that Grave (Resurrection Power)" (with Brandon Lake)	2020	38	—		Revival's in the Air
"—" denotes a recording that did not chart

== Videos ==
=== Music videos ===
List of official music videos
Year	Song	View At	Album	Director(s)
2012	"Come to Me" (Bethel Music and Jenn Johnson)	Apple Music; YouTube	The Loft Sessions	Aaron Rich
2012	"One Thing Remains" (Bethel Music and Brian Johnson)	Apple Music; YouTube	The Loft Sessions	Aaron Rich
2012	"You Know Me" (Bethel Music and Steffany Gretzinger)	Apple Music; YouTube	The Loft Sessions	Aaron Rich
2012	"Walk in the Promise" (Bethel Music and Jeremy Riddle)	YouTube	The Loft Sessions	Aaron Rich
2012	"Fall Afresh" (Bethel Music and Jeremy Riddle)		The Loft Sessions	Aaron Rich
2012	"You Have Won Me" (Bethel Music and Brian Johnson)	YouTube	The Loft Sessions	Aaron Rich
2012	"My Dear" (Bethel Music and Hunter G K Thompson)	YouTube	The Loft Sessions	Aaron Rich
2012	"This Is What You Do" (Bethel Music and Matt Stinton)	YouTube	The Loft Sessions	Aaron Rich
2012	"Draw Near" (Bethel Music and Jeremy Riddle)	YouTube	The Loft Sessions	Aaron Rich
2012	"Angels" (Bethel Music and Brian Johnson)	YouTube	The Loft Sessions	Aaron Rich
2012	"For the Sake of the World" (Bethel Music and Brian Johnson)	YouTube	For the Sake of the World	Rick McDonald
2012	"Our Father" (Bethel Music and Jenn Johnson)	YouTube	For the Sake of the World	Rick McDonald
2012	"Closer" (Bethel Music and Steffany Gretzinger)	Apple Music; YouTube	For the Sake of the World	Rick McDonald
2012	"To Our God" (Bethel Music and Brian Johnson)	Apple Music; YouTube	For the Sake of the World	Rick McDonald
2012	"Who You Are" (Bethel Music and Jenn Johnson)	Apple Music; YouTube	For the Sake of the World	Rick McDonald
2012	"This Is Amazing Grace" (Bethel Music and Jeremy Riddle)	YouTube	For the Sake of the World	Rick McDonald
2012	"Freedom" (Bethel Music and William Mathews)	YouTube	For the Sake of the World	Rick McDonald
2012	"I Really Love You (Spontaneous)" (Bethel Music, Brian Johnson and Jenn Johnson)	YouTube	For the Sake of the World	Rick McDonald
2012	"In Your Light" (Bethel Music and Jeremy Riddle)	YouTube	For the Sake of the World	Rick McDonald
2012	"This Is What You Do" (Bethel Music and William Mathews)	YouTube	For the Sake of the World	Rick McDonald
2012	"Forgiven" (Bethel Music and Brian Johnson)	YouTube	For the Sake of the World	Rick McDonald
2012	"You Have Won Me" (Bethel Music and Brian Johnson)	YouTube	For the Sake of the World	Rick McDonald
2012	"Everything To You (Spontaneous)" (Bethel Music and Jenn Johnson)	YouTube	For the Sake of the World	Rick McDonald
2013	"God I Look to You"	Apple Music; YouTube	Without Words	—N/a
2014	"You Make Me Brave" (Bethel Music and Amanda Cook)	Apple Music; YouTube	You Make Me Brave	—N/a
2014	"Come to Me" (Bethel Music and Jenn Johnson)	Apple Music; YouTube	You Make Me Brave	—N/a
2014	"Forever" (Bethel Music and Kari Jobe)	Apple Music; YouTube	You Make Me Brave	—N/a
2014	"It is Well" (Bethel Music and Kristene DiMarco)	YouTube	You Make Me Brave	—N/a
2014	"Joy of the Lord (Spontaneous)" (Bethel Music and Jenn Johnson)	YouTube	You Make Me Brave	—N/a
2014	"A Little Longer" (Bethel Music and Jenn Johnson)	YouTube	You Make Me Brave	—N/a
2014	"Anchor" (Bethel Music and Leah Valenzuela)	YouTube	You Make Me Brave	—N/a
2014	"Shepherd" (Bethel Music and Amanda Cook)	YouTube	You Make Me Brave	—N/a
2014	"Wonder (Spontaneous)" (Bethel Music and Amanda Cook)	YouTube	You Make Me Brave	—N/a
2014	"We Step into Freedom (Spontaneous)" (Bethel Music and Jenn Johnson)	YouTube	You Make Me Brave	—N/a
2015	"Ever Be" (Bethel Music and Kalley Heiligenthal)	Apple Music; YouTube	We Will Not Be Shaken	Nathan Grubbs; Luke Manwaring
2015	"In Over My Head (Crash Over Me)" (Bethel Music and Jenn Johnson)	Apple Music; YouTube	We Will Not Be Shaken	Nathan Grubbs; Luke Manwaring
2015	"Jesus, We Love You" (Bethel Music and Paul McClure)	Apple Music; YouTube	We Will Not Be Shaken	Nathan Grubbs; Luke Manwaring
2015	"No Longer Slaves" (Bethel Music, Jonathan David Helser and Melissa Helser)	Apple Music; YouTube	We Will Not Be Shaken	Nathan Grubbs; Luke Manwaring
2015	"We Will Not Be Shaken" (Bethel Music and Brian Johnson)	Apple Music; YouTube	We Will Not Be Shaken	Nathan Grubbs; Luke Manwaring
2015	"You Don't Miss a Thing" (Bethel Music and Amanda Cook)	YouTube	We Will Not Be Shaken	Nathan Grubbs; Luke Manwaring
2015	"Home" (Bethel Music and Hunter G K Thompson)	YouTube	We Will Not Be Shaken	Nathan Grubbs; Luke Manwaring
2015	"Nearness" (Bethel Music and Jenn Johnson)	YouTube	We Will Not Be Shaken	Nathan Grubbs; Luke Manwaring
2015	"You Are My One Thing" (Bethel Music and Hannah McClure)	YouTube	We Will Not Be Shaken	Nathan Grubbs; Luke Manwaring
2015	"Who Can Compare to You" (Bethel Music and Matt Stinton)	YouTube	We Will Not Be Shaken	Nathan Grubbs; Luke Manwaring
2015	"Seas of Crimson" (Bethel Music and Brian Johnson)	YouTube	We Will Not Be Shaken	Nathan Grubbs; Luke Manwaring
2015	"Seas of Crimson"	Vimeo; YouTube	Without Words: Synesthesia	Travis Hanour
2016	"Have It All" (Bethel Music and Brian Johnson)	YouTube	Have It All	Michael Pope
2016	"Be Enthroned" (Bethel Music and Jeremy Riddle)	YouTube	Have It All	Michael Pope
2016	"Son of God" (Bethel Music and Cory Asbury)	YouTube	Have It All	Michael Pope
2016	"Lion and the Lamb" (Bethel Music and Leeland)	YouTube	Have It All	Michael Pope
2016	"Spirit Move" (Bethel Music and Kalley Heiligenthal)	YouTube	Have It All	Michael Pope
2016	"Thank You" (Bethel Music and Jonathan David Helser)	YouTube	Have It All	Michael Pope
2016	"Heaven Come" (Bethel Music and Jenn Johnson)	YouTube	Have It All	Michael Pope
2017	"Starlight" (Bethel Music and Amanda Cook)	YouTube	Starlight	Chris Estes
2017	"Take Courage" (Bethel Music and Kristene DiMarco)	YouTube	Starlight	Chris Estes
2017	"You Came (Lazarus)" (Bethel Music and Amanda Cook)	YouTube	Starlight	Chris Estes
2018	"Mighty Sound (Spontaneous)" (Bethel Music, Brian Johnson and Jenn Johnson)	YouTube	Moments: Mighty Sound	—N/a
2018	"Reckless Love (Spontaneous)" (Bethel Music and Steffany Gretzinger)	YouTube	Moments: Mighty Sound	—N/a
2018	"Spirit Move (Spontaneous)" (Bethel Music and Molly Skaggs)	YouTube	Moments: Mighty Sound	—N/a
2018	"Catch the Wind (Spontaneous)" (Bethel Music and Melissa Helser)	YouTube	Moments: Mighty Sound	—N/a
2018	"Like a Flood (Spontaneous)" (Bethel Music and Molly Skaggs)	YouTube	Moments: Mighty Sound	—N/a
2018	"Pieces (Spontaneous)" (Bethel Music and Amanda Cook)	YouTube	Moments: Mighty Sound	—N/a
2018	"Come to Me" (Bethel Music, Jenn Johnson and Brian Johnson)	YouTube	Moments: Mighty Sound	—N/a
2018	"On the Shores (Spontaneous)" (Bethel Music, Jeremy Riddle and Steffany Gretzinger)	YouTube	Moments: Mighty Sound	—N/a
2018	"In Over My Head (Spontaneous)" (Bethel Music and Amanda Cook)	YouTube	Moments: Mighty Sound	—N/a
2018	"Where You Are (Spontaneous)" (Bethel Music and Leeland Mooring)	YouTube	Moments: Mighty Sound	—N/a
2018	"Cornerstone (Spontaneous)" (Bethel Music, Brittany Mondesir and Reuben Morgan)	YouTube	Moments: Mighty Sound	—N/a
2018	"Breathe Out Your Praise (Spontaneous)" (Bethel Music, Paul McClure and Leeland Mooring)	YouTube	Moments: Mighty Sound	—N/a
2018	"Living Hope" (Bethel Music and Bethany Worhle)	YouTube	—N/a	—N/a
2018	"Stand in Your Love" (Bethel Music and Josh Baldwin)	YouTube	Victory	—N/a
2019	"Raise a Hallelujah" (Bethel Music, Jonathan David Helser and Melissa Helser)	YouTube	Victory	—N/a
2019	"Goodness of God" (Bethel Music and Jenn Johnson)	YouTube	Victory	—N/a
2019	"Ain't No Grave" (Bethel Music and Molly Skaggs)	YouTube	Victory	—N/a
2019	"Victory is Yours" (Bethel Music and Bethany Wohrle)	YouTube	Victory	—N/a
2019	"Por Siempre" (Bethel Music and Kalley Heiligenthal)	YouTube	Bethel Music en Español	—N/a

=== Lyric videos ===
List of lyric videos
Year	Song	View At	Album
2013	"Letting Go" (Bethel Music and Steffany Gretzinger)	YouTube	Tides
2013	"Chasing You" (Bethel Music and Jenn Johnson)	YouTube	Tides
2013	"Ascend" (Bethel Music and William Matthews)	YouTube	Tides
2013	"Be Still" (Bethel Music and Steffany Gretzinger)	YouTube	Tides
2013	"Breaking Through" (Bethel Music and Jeremy Riddle)	YouTube	Tides
2013	"Come Awaken Love" (Bethel Music and Hunter G K Thompson)	YouTube	Tides
2013	"For the Cross" (Bethel Music, Brian Johnson and Jenn Johnson)	YouTube	Tides
2013	"Forever" (Bethel Music and Brian Johnson)	YouTube	Tides
2013	"Give Me Jesus" (Bethel Music and Matt Stinton)	YouTube	Tides
2013	"Heaven's Song" (Bethel Music and Jeremy Riddle)	YouTube	Tides
2013	"I Can Feel You" (Bethel Music and Jenn Johnson)	YouTube	Tides
2013	"Strong in Us" (Bethel Music and Brian Johnson)	YouTube	Tides
2013	"Tides"	YouTube	Tides
2014	"We Dance" (Bethel Music and Steffany Gretzinger)	YouTube	You Make Me Brave
2015	"Ever Be" (Bethel Music and Kalley Heiligenthal)	YouTube	We Will Not Be Shaken
2015	"Home" (Bethel Music and Hunter G K Thompson)	YouTube	We Will Not Be Shaken
2015	"In Over My Head (Crash Over Me)" (Bethel Music and Jenn Johnson)	YouTube	We Will Not Be Shaken
2015	"Jesus, We Love You" (Bethel Music and Paul McClure)	YouTube	We Will Not Be Shaken
2015	"Nearness" (Bethel Music and Jenn Johnson)	YouTube	We Will Not Be Shaken
2015	"No Longer Slaves" (Bethel Music, Jonathan David Helser and Melissa Helser)	YouTube	We Will Not Be Shaken
2015	"Seas of Crimson" (Bethel Music and Brian Johnson)	YouTube	We Will Not Be Shaken
2015	"We Will Not Be Shaken" (Bethel Music and Brian Johnson)	YouTube	We Will Not Be Shaken
2015	"Who Can Compare to You" (Bethel Music and Matt Stinton)	YouTube	We Will Not Be Shaken
2015	"You Are My One Thing" (Bethel Music and Hannah McClure)	YouTube	We Will Not Be Shaken
2015	"You Don't Miss A Thing" (Bethel Music and Amanda Cook)	YouTube	We Will Not Be Shaken
2015	"It is Well" (Bethel Music and Kristene DiMarco)	YouTube	You Make Me Brave
2016	"Be Enthroned" (Bethel Music and Jeremy Riddle)	YouTube	Have It All
2016	"Faithful to the End" (Bethel Music, Paul McClure and Hannah McClure)	YouTube	Have It All
2016	"Glory to Glory" (Bethel Music and William Matthews)	YouTube	Have It All
2016	"Greatness of Your Glory" (Bethel Music and Brian Johnson)	YouTube	Have It All
2016	"Have It All" (Bethel Music and Brian Johnson)	YouTube	Have It All
2016	"Heaven Come" (Bethel Music and Jenn Johnson)	YouTube	Have It All
2016	"Lion and the Lamb" (Bethel Music and Leeland)	YouTube	Have It All
2016	"Mercy" (Bethel Music and Amanda Cook)	YouTube	Have It All
2016	"Pieces" (Bethel Music and Steffany Gretzinger)	YouTube	Have It All
2016	"Praises (Be Lifted Up)" (Bethel Music and Josh Baldwin)	YouTube	Have It All
2016	"Shine on Us" (Bethel Music and William Matthews)	YouTube	Have It All
2016	"Son of God" (Bethel Music and Cory Asbury)	YouTube	Have It All
2016	"Spirit Move" (Bethel Music and Kalley Heiligenthal)	YouTube	Have It All
2016	"Thank You" (Bethel Music and Jonathan David Helser)	YouTube	Have It All
2017	"Catch the Wind" (Bethel Music and Melissa Helser)	YouTube	Starlight
2017	"Extravagant" (Bethel Music, Steffany Gretzinger and Amanda Cook)	YouTube	Starlight
2017	"For the One" (Bethel Music and Jenn Johnson)	YouTube	Starlight
2017	"God I Look to You" (Bethel Music and Francesca Battistelli)	YouTube	Starlight
2017	"King of My Heart" (Bethel Music, Steffany Gretzinger and Jeremy Riddle)	YouTube	Starlight
2017	"Old for New" (Bethel Music and Hannah McClure)	YouTube	Starlight
2017	"Starlight" (Bethel Music and Amanda Cook)	YouTube	Starlight
2017	"Take Courage" (Bethel Music and Kristene DiMarco)	YouTube	Starlight
2017	"There's No Other Name" (Bethel Music and Francesca Battistelli)	YouTube	Starlight
2017	"The War Is Over" (Bethel Music and Kalley Heiligenthal)	YouTube	Starlight
2017	"You Came (Lazarus)" (Bethel Music and Amanda Cook)	YouTube	Starlight
2019	"Raise a Hallelujah" (Bethel Music, Jonathan David Helser and Melissa Helser)	YouTube	Victory
2019	"Goodness of God" (Bethel Music and Jenn Johnson)	YouTube	Victory
2019	"Ain't No Grave" (Bethel Music and Molly Skaggs)	YouTube	Victory
2019	"Stand in Your Love" (Bethel Music and Josh Baldwin)	YouTube	Victory
2019	"Victory is Yours" (Bethel Music and Bethany Worhle)	YouTube	Victory
2019	"There Is a Name" (Bethel Music and Sean Feucht)	YouTube	Victory
2019	"Promises Never Fail" (Bethel Music & Emmy Rose)	YouTube	Victory
2019	"Praise Is the Highway" (Bethel Music and Brian Johnson)	YouTube	Victory
2019	"Drenched In Love" (Bethel Music, Daniel Bashta and Harvest)	YouTube	Victory
2019	"Every Crown" (Bethel Music and Kalley Heiligenthal)	YouTube	Victory
2019	"How Great A King" (Bethel Music, Hannah McClure and Paul McClure)	YouTube	Victory
2019	"Christ is Risen" (Bethel Music and Hunter G K Thompson)	YouTube	Victory
2019	"Living Hope" (Bethel Music, Brian Johnson and Jenn Johnson)	YouTube	Victory
2019	"Endless Alleluia" (Bethel Music and Cory Asbury)	YouTube	Victory
