= I'm So Blessed =

2021 song by Cain

Single by Cain

from the album Rise Up
- Released: July 15, 2022
- Genre: CCM; Christian country
- Length: 2:55
- Label: Provident Label Group
- Songwriters: Jonathan Smith; Logan Cain; Madison Cain; Matthew West; Taylor Cain
- Producers: David Leonard; Brad King; Seth Talley

Cain singles chronology
"Desert Road" (2022)	"I'm So Blessed" (2022)	"(Christmas) Baby Please Come Home" (2022)

I'm So Blessed (Child of God Collection)
- EP cover

Music videos
- "I'm So Blessed" on YouTube
- "I'm So Blessed" (Best Day Remix) on YouTube
- "I'm So Blessed" (Live) on YouTube
- "I'm So Blessed" (Song Session) on YouTube

"I'm So Blessed" is a song performed by American Christian country band Cain. The song impacted Christian radio in the United States on July 15, 2022, as the fourth single from their debut studio album, Rise Up (2021). The song was written by Jonathan Smith, Logan Cain, Madison Cain, Matthew West, and Taylor Cain. The production of the single was handled by David Leonard, Brad King, and Seth Talley.

"I'm So Blessed" peaked at number three on the US Hot Christian Songs chart.

== Background ==
Cain released "I'm So Blessed" to Christian radio in the United States on July 15, 2022. Being the fourth single from their debut album Rise Up (2021), "I'm So Blessed" follows previously released singles "Rise Up (Lazarus)," "Yes He Can," and "The Commission." On September 9, 2022, Cain released a new version of "I'm So Blessed" featuring rapper Aaron Cole. On October 13, 2022, the band released "I'm So Blessed (Best Day Remix)." On December 9, 2022, the band released I'm So Blessed (Child Of God Collection), an EP containing six versions of the song.

== Composition ==
"I'm So Blessed" is composed in the key of D with a tempo of 79 beats per minute and a musical time signature of 4/4.

== Critical reception ==
Timothy Yap of JubileeCast opined that the song is "a little too self-absorbed lyrically," while ultimately being "saved by its infectious pop-centric chorus." 365 Days of Inspiring Media's Joshua Andre gave a positive review of the song, saying it is "a gospel infused worship anthem that basically recounts that our providence over us from God is because of who He is and not due to anything that we have done or will ever do."

== Commercial performance ==
"I'm So Blessed" made its debut at number 49 on the US Christian Airplay chart dated July 30, 2022.

"I'm So Blessed" debuted at number 13 on the US Hot Christian Songs chart dated January 7, 2023, being the highest ranking debut that week.

== Music videos ==
The official audio video of "I'm So Blessed" was published on Cain's YouTube channel on May 7, 2021. The official music video for "I'm So Blessed" premiered on Cain's YouTube channel on July 15, 2022. The music video was filmed on location in Sherman Oaks, California.

Cain released the "I'm So Blessed (Best Day Remix)" performance video filmed at K-Love on November 4, 2022, on YouTube. On December 15, 2022, Cain issued the official live performance video of the song via YouTube. The Song Session video of the song was availed by Essential Worship on January 27, 2023, to YouTube.

== Track listing ==
"I'm So Blessed" (Aaron Cole Mix)
No.	Title	Length
1.	"I'm So Blessed" (Aaron Cole Mix)	2:55

"I'm So Blessed" (Best Day Remix)
No.	Title	Length
1.	"I'm So Blessed" (Best Day Remix)	2:55

I'm So Blessed (Child of God Collection) — EP
No.	Title	Length
1.	"I'm So Blessed" (Fan Request)	0:45
2.	"I'm So Blessed" (Live)	4:43
3.	"I'm So Blessed" (Best Day Remix)	2:55
4.	"I'm So Blessed" (Aaron Cole Mix)	2:55
5.	"I'm So Blessed" (Sped Up)	1:53
6.	"I'm So Blessed"	2:55
Total length:		16:08

== Charts ==
=== Weekly charts ===
Weekly chart performance for "I'm So Blessed"
Chart (2022–2023)	Peak position
US Christian Songs (Billboard)	3
US Christian Airplay (Billboard)	8
US Christian AC (Billboard)	7

=== Year-end charts ===
Year-end chart performance for "I'm So Blessed"
Chart (2022)	Position
US Christian Digital Song Sales (Billboard)	44
Chart (2023)	Position
US Christian Songs (Billboard)	10
US Christian Airplay (Billboard)	30
US Christian AC (Billboard)	27

== Release history ==
Release dates and formats for "I'm So Blessed"
Region	Date	Version	Format	Label	Ref.
United States	July 15, 2022	Album	Christian radio	Provident Label Group	
Various	September 9, 2022	Aaron Cole Mix	Digital download; streaming	Provident Label Group	
Various	October 13, 2022	Best Day Remix	Digital download; streaming	Provident Label Group	
Various	December 9, 2022	EP	Digital download; streaming	Provident Label Group	
