= The Way Home =

The Way Home may refer to:

- The Way Home (2002 film), a South Korean film by Lee Jeong-hyang
- The Way Home (2010 film), an American film starring Dean Cain
- The Way Home, also known as Veettilekkulla Vazhi, a 2010 Indian Malayalam film
- The Way Home (novel), a 1925 novel by Henry Handel Richardson in the trilogy The Fortunes of Richard Mahony
- The Way Home (short story), a short story by Franz Kafka written between 1904 and 1912
- The Way Home (TV series), a 2023 television series starring Andie MacDowell and Chyler Leigh
- The Way Home (Russ Taff album), 1989
- The Way Home (The McClures album), 2019
- The Way Home, a 1978 album by Kevin Braheny
- The Way Home, a 2006 play by Chloe Moss
- The Way Home, a 2009 novel by George Pelecanos
- The Way Home, a 1985 non-fiction book by Mary Pride

== See also ==
- Put Domoi (The Way Home), a Russian street newspaper
