= Rise Up (Cain album) =

Studio album by Cain
- Released: May 7, 2021
- Recorded: 2020
- Genre: Christian country; CCM
- Length: 33:37
- Label: Provident Label Group
- Producer: Nick Schwarz; David Leonard; Brad King; Seth Talley; Jonathan Smith; Jeff Pardo; Bryan Fowler; Jordan Mohilowski

Cain chronology
Cain (2020)	Rise Up (2021)	Honest Offering (2023)

Singles from Rise Up
- 1. "Rise Up (Lazarus)" Released: April 17, 2020; 2. "Yes He Can" Released: April 16, 2021; 3. "The Commission" Released: December 11, 2021; 4. "I'm So Blessed" Released: July 15, 2022

Rise Up is the debut studio album by American Christian country band Cain. The album was released on May 7, 2021, by Provident Label Group. The album was produced by Nick Schwarz, David Leonard, Brad King, Seth Talley, Jonathan Smith, Jeff Pardo, Bryan Fowler, and Jordan Mohilowski.

The album has been supported by the release of "Rise Up (Lazarus)", "Yes He Can", "The Commission", and "I'm So Blessed" as singles. The title track, "Rise Up (Lazarus)", peaked at number four on the Hot Christian Songs chart. "Yes He Can" peaked at number five on the Hot Christian Songs chart. "The Commission" peaked at number two on the Hot Christian Songs chart. "I'm So Blessed" peaked at number three on the Hot Christian Songs chart.

Rise Up peaked at number six on Billboard's Top Christian Albums Chart in the United States. Rise Up received two GMA Dove Award nominations for Pop/Contemporary Album of the Year and Recorded Music Packaging of the Year at the 2022 GMA Dove Awards.

== Background ==
Cain made their debut on Provident Label Group with the release of their self-titled extended play in March 2020, and the release of their single "Rise Up (Lazarus)" to Christian radio. The trio then released multiple covers of songs as standalone singles for songs such as "Egypt" by Bethel Music and Cory Asbury, "There Was Jesus" by Zach Williams and Dolly Parton, and "Celebrate Me Home" by Kenny Loggins. In April 2021, Cain announced that Rise Up will be their first full-length album, containing tracks previously released on their debut EP as well as new tracks.

== Release and promotion ==
=== Singles ===
"Rise Up (Lazarus)" was released to Christian radio in the United States as the lead single from the album on April 17, 2020. "Rise Up (Lazarus)" peaked at number four on the US Hot Christian Songs chart.

"Yes He Can" was released to Christian radio in the United States as the second single from the album on April 16, 2021. "Yes He Can" peaked at number four on the US Hot Christian Songs chart.

"The Commission" was released as the third single from the album on December 11, 2021. The song impacted Christian radio in the United States on December 31, 2021. "The Commission" peaked at number two on the US Hot Christian Songs chart.

"I'm So Blessed" impacted Christian radio in the United States on July 15, 2022, becoming the fourth single from the album. "I'm So Blessed" peaked at number three on the US Hot Christian Songs chart.

== Reception ==
=== Critical response ===
Professional ratings
Review scores
Source	Rating
365 Days of Inspiring Media	4.5/5
JubileeCast	3.5/5

Joshua Andre in his 365 Days of Inspiring Media review opined that Rise Up is "one of my favourite albums of the year thus far, in terms of enthusiasm and accessibility and lyrical poignancy; CAIN is definitely for fans of artists like I Am They and Rend Collective." Timothy Yap of JubileeCast had mixed reactions of the album, ultimately concluding that "Rise Up is a welcoming debut. The bright and uplifting tunes, the catchy pop choruses, and the siblings fine harmonies make Rise Up a noteworthy record among the sea of new releases."

=== Accolades ===
Awards
Year	Organization	Award	Result	Ref
2022	GMA Dove Awards	Pop/Contemporary Album of the Year	Nominated	
2022	GMA Dove Awards	Recorded Music Packaging of the Year	Nominated	

Year-end lists
Publication	Accolade	Rank	Ref.
Louder Than The Music	LTTM Album Awards 2021	7	

== Commercial performance ==
In the United States, Rise Up debuted at number 20 on the Billboard Top Christian Albums chart dated May 22, 2021.

== Track listing ==
Rise Up — Standard edition
No.	Title	Writer(s)	Producer(s)	Length
1.	"Come Forth"	Logan Cain; Madison Cain; Scott Mills; Taylor Cain	Nick Schwarz	2:36
2.	"Rise Up (Lazarus)"	L. Cain; M. Cain; Nick Schwarz; T. Cain	Nick Schwarz	3:26
3.	"I'm So Blessed"	Jonathan Smith; L. Cain; M. Cain; Matthew West; T. Cain	David Leonard; Brad King; Seth Talley	2:55
4.	"The Commission"	Blake Neesmith; Carter Frodge; L. Cain; M. Cain; T. Cain	Jonathan Smith	3:16
5.	"Yes He Can"	Jeff Pardo; L. Cain; M. Cain; T. Cain	Jeff Pardo	3:19
6.	"People Need People"	Bryan Fowler; L. Cain; M. Cain; Nick Schwarz; T. Cain	Bryan Fowler; Nick Schwarz	3:34
7.	"Revival"	Jess Cates; Jordan Mohilowski; L. Cain; M. Cain; T. Cain	Jordan Mohilowski	3:55
8.	"Over My Head"	Jonathan Smith; L. Cain; M. Cain; T. Cain	Jonathan Smith	2:50
9.	"Keep Following"	David Leonard; L. Cain; M. Cain; T. Cain	David Leonard; Brad King; Seth Talley	3:06
10.	"Hey Jesus"	L. Cain; M. Cain; T. Cain	Nick Schwarz	4:40
Total length:				33:37

Rise Up — Apple Music bonus content
No.	Title	Length
11.	"Rise Up (Lazarus)" (Music Video)	3:33
12.	"Yes He Can" (Music Video)	3:21

== Charts ==
=== Weekly charts ===
Weekly chart performance for Rise Up
Chart (2021–2023)	Peak position
US Christian Albums (Billboard)	6

=== Year-end charts ===
Year-end chart performance for Rise Up
Chart (2021)	Position
US Christian Albums (Billboard)	59
Chart (2022)	Position
US Christian Albums (Billboard)	32
Chart (2023)	Position
US Christian Albums (Billboard)	15

== Release history ==
Release history and formats for Rise Up
Region	Date	Format(s)	Label(s)	Ref.
Various	May 7, 2021	Digital download; streaming	Provident Label Group	
