= It Is Well (disambiguation) =

"It Is Well", or "It Is Well with My Soul", is a hymn by Horatio Spafford and Philip Bliss.

It may also refer to:

- It Is Well (album), a 2009 album by Kutless, which includes a version of "It Is Well"
- "It Is Well" (Bethel Music and Kristene DiMarco song), a 2015 song which includes an interpolation of "It Is Well"
