= Carry the Fire =

Carry the Fire may refer to:

- Carry the Fire (Delta Rae album), 2012
- Carry the Fire (Dustin Kensrue album), 2015
- Carry the Fire (WorshipMob album), 2015
