= Without Words: Synesthesia =

Remix album by Bethel Music
- Released: July 31, 2015
- Recorded: 2015
- Genre: CCM; worship
- Length: 69:05
- Label: Bethel Music
- Producer: Chris Greely; Bobby Strand

Bethel Music remix album chronology
Without Words (2013)	Without Words: Synesthesia (2015)	After All These Years (Instrumental) (2017)

Bethel Music chronology
We Will Not Be Shaken (Live) (2015)	Without Words: Synesthesia (2015)	Have It All (2016)

Without Words: Synesthesia is the second remix album by Bethel Music, the second release in their Without Words series, and their eleventh album, overall. The album was released on July 31, 2015 via the collective's imprint label, Bethel Music. Bobby Strand and Chris Greely produced the album.

== Background ==
Keeping with the nature of the previous Without Words album, Synesthesia recreates previous songs released by Bethel Music, as well as songs released by other artists, into instrumental tracks. Prior to the release of the album, "vignette"-type videos were released onto YouTube with previews of "You Make Me Brave," "For the Cross," and "It Is Well." Synesthesia, however, took its own clear direction with the new electronica-infused variations, compared to the first Without Words album.

== Critical reception ==
Professional ratings
Review scores
Source	Rating
CCM Magazine	4/5 stars
The Christian Beat	4.6/5
NewReleaseToday	4.5/5 stars

Awarding the album four stars from CCM Magazine, Kevin Sparkman states, "The instrumentation, orchestration, and overall arranging on Synesthesia prove the level of depth and talent behind this organization." Mark Ryan, giving the album four and a half stars for NewReleaseToday, writes, "The album calms the soul and brings you to a perfect place of quietness so that you can hear the only words that truly matter". Lauren McLean, rating the album a 4.6 out of five at The Christian Beat, writes, "Without Words: Synesthesia...sure is an eye opener."

Initial critical responses to the album have been positive. NewReleaseToday stated that the album "is at times reminiscent of the more organic Without Words...this sophomore project takes a distinctly new direction, incorporating electronic elements and ethereal vocal layering." AllAboutWorship.com suggests that the "fantastic arrangements" be used "for pre-service music, transitional tunes and ministry music" and lauds "the musicality and creativity of Bethel Music." HollywoodJesus.com notes that "with unique instruments filling in for the vocals...you can almost concentrate and ‘feel' the music even more."

== Awards and accolades ==
On August 11, 2016, the Gospel Music Association was announced that Without Words: Synesthesia would be nominated for a GMA Dove Award in the Instrumental Album of the Year category at the 47th Annual GMA Dove Awards.

On October 11, 2016, Without Words: Synesthesia won the GMA Dove Award for Instrumental Album of the Year with producers Chris Greely and Bobby Strand being the recipients.

== Commercial performance ==
Without Words: Synesthesia debuted on the Billboard Christian Albums chart at No. 2 with 5,000 units of the album being sold, whilst being Bethel Music's eighth appearance on the chart. The album also registered on Billboard's Digital Albums chart at number 19, and at No. 112 on the all-encompassing Billboard 200 chart for the best-selling albums in the United States.

== Track listing ==
Without Words: Synethesia
No.	Title	Writer(s)	Length
1.	"Chroma (Intro)"	Bobby Strand	1:30
2.	"It Is Well"	Kristene DiMarco	5:13
3.	"This Is Amazing Grace"	Josh Farro; Phil Wickham; Jeremy Riddle	3:50
4.	"For the Cross"	Jenn Johnson; Gabriel Wilson; Ian McIntosh	4:47
5.	"Isabelline (Interlude)"	Strand	1:19
6.	"Oceans"	Matt Crocker; Joel Houston; Salomon Ligthelm	5:44
7.	"Eminence (Interlude)"	Strand	1:38
8.	"Seas of Crimson"	Strand; Brian Johnson; Daniel Bashta; Joel Taylor	4:25
9.	"Jesus We Love You"	Paul McClure; Hannah McClure; Kalley Heiligenthal	5:55
10.	"Atramentous (Interlude)"	Strand	1:34
11.	"You Make Me Brave"	Amanda Cook	4:40
12.	"Luminosity (Interlude)"	Strand; Michael Spear	4:08
13.	"Closer"	Cook	4:37
14.	"Ultramarine (Interlude)"	Strand; Chris Greely	1:44
15.	"Ever Be"	Strand; Wilson; Heiligenthal; Greely	4:36
16.	"Viridian (Interlude)"	Greely; Eric Lemiere; Josiah Sherman	1:49
17.	"Heaven's Song"	Riddle	4:55
18.	"In Over My Head"	Johnson; John-Paul Gentile	5:07
19.	"Synesthesia (Outro)"	Strand	1:34

== Charts ==
Chart (2015)	Peak position
Australian Albums (ARIA)	60
US Billboard 200	112
US Christian Albums (Billboard)	2
US Digital Albums (Billboard)	10
