= Revival's in the Air =

2020 live album by Bethel Music

Live album by Bethel Music
- Released: May 29, 2020
- Recorded: 2019–2020
- Venue: Bethel Church, Redding, California, U.S.
- Genre: Contemporary worship music
- Length: 104:26
- Label: Bethel Music
- Producer: Brian Johnson; Joel Taylor

Bethel Music chronology
Peace (2019)	Revival's in the Air (2020)	Homecoming (2021)

Singles from Revival's in the Air
- 1. "God of Revival" Released: February 7, 2020; 2. "We Praise You" Released: March 6, 2020; 3. "Egypt" Released: April 3, 2020; 4. "Champion" Released: July 17, 2020; 5. "Revival's in the Air" Released: September 4, 2020

Revival's in the Air (stylized in capital letters) is the twelfth live album by California-based worship collective Bethel Music, and their twentieth full-length release overall. The album was released through the collective's imprint label, Bethel Music, on May 29, 2020. The featured worship leaders on the album are Brian Johnson, Jenn Johnson, Cory Asbury, Jonathan David & Melissa Helser, Josh Baldwin, Kristene DiMarco, Paul McClure, Hannah McClure, Brandon Lake, Bethany Wohrle, and Dante Bowe. Brian Johnson and Joel Taylor produced the album, working with assistant producers David Whitworth, John-Paul Gentile and Matthew Ogden.

The album was supported by five singles: "God of Revival", "We Praise You", "Egypt", "Champion" and "Revival's in the Air".

Revival's in the Air became a commercially successful album upon its release, debuting at No. 2 on Billboard's Top Christian Albums Chart in the United States, and at No. 3 on the Official Charts' Official Christian & Gospel Albums Chart in the United Kingdom. Revival's in the Air received nominations for the GMA Dove Award Worship Album of the Year and Recorded Music Packaging of the Year at the 2021 GMA Dove Awards.

== Background ==
"Although this time has been difficult in many ways, we’ve watched God move, disrupt and revive—in family time, the global spread of the Church in homes, personal awareness of what we need to work on, priority checks, a worldwide reset, fresh hunger and total dependence on God. Through this shaking, people are being awakened. revival is in the air."

– Brian Johnson, on the decision to change the name of the album from God of Revival to Revival's in the Air amidst the COVID-19 pandemic.

On February 3, 2020, Bethel Music initially announced the title of the album as God of Revival, with the then-intended title track, "God of Revival", set to be released as the lead single to the album on February 7, 2020, concurrently revealing the cover artwork, and availing the song for pre-save on Spotify. On May 11, 2020, Bethel Music announced that the album was renamed to Revival's in the Air, with the release date slated for May 29, 2020.

Brian Johnson spoke about the changes in the album's creative direction, saying that the album initially began with the theme 'God of Revival' and tried to make changes in response to what God was saying, though kept returning to the theme of 'Revival'. The name Revival's in the Air was said to be inspired by the album's title track, a song penned by Jonathan David & Melissa Helser with their son, Cadence.

== Release and promotion ==
=== Singles ===
On February 7, 2020, the album's lead single, "God of Revival", was released digitally on music stores and streaming services, along with the accompanying music video. The single peaked at number thirty-one on the US Hot Christian Songs.

"We Praise You" was released digitally on music stores and streaming services along with the accompanying music video, on March 6, 2020, as the album's second single.

"Egypt" was released digitally on music stores and streaming services along with the accompanying music video, on April 6, as the album's third single. The song peaked at number thirty-eight on the US Hot Christian Songs.

The studio-recorded version of "Champion" was released in digital format on July 17, 2020.

The studio-recorded version of "Revival's in the Air" was released in digital format on September 4, 2020.

=== Promotional singles ===
On May 11, 2020, Bethel Music revealed the release date of the album to be May 29, and shared that they will release the fourth song from the album on May 15, 2020, followed by the release of additional tracks starting May 25, with the release of a new song being availed each day till the release date. On May 15, 2020, Bethel Music launched the album's pre-order with the release of "Champion", along with the song's accompanying music video. "Champion" debuted at number 32 on the US Hot Christian Songs chart.

On May 25, 2020, Bethel Music released "Come Out of that Grave (Resurrection Power)" as the first of four cascading singles towards the album's release, with the accompanying music video. Bethel Music also revealed that "Anything Is Possible", "Reign Above It All" and "Revival's in the Air" would be the other singles to be released on each day leading up to the album's release in that respective order. "Anything Is Possible" was released on May 26, followed by "Reign Above It All" on May 27, and ending the album's pre-order period with the release of "Revival's in the Air" on May 28, along with the accompanying music videos for the songs.

== Reception ==
=== Critical response ===
Professional ratings
Review scores
Source	Rating
Hallels	5/5

Hallel's Timothy Yap applauded Bethel Music in his review of the album, describing the album as a collection of "well-crafted pop worship anthems quipped with strong hooks and distinctive melodies." Yap arrived at this conclusion about the album: "From start to finish, there's not a weak moment on the record. "Revival's in the Air" is easily Bethel Music's best record to date."

=== Accolades ===
Awards
Year	Organization	Award	Result	Ref
2021	GMA Dove Awards	Worship Album of the Year	Nominated	
2021	GMA Dove Awards	Recorded Music Packaging of the Year	Nominated	

== Commercial performance ==
In the United States, Revival's in the Air debuted on the Billboard Top Christian Albums chart at number two, having earned 5,000 equivalent album units in the first week of sales.

Revival's in the Air also debuted in the top five on the OCC's Official Christian & Gospel Albums Chart in the United Kingdom, launching at number three in the week ending June 11, 2020.

== Track listing ==
Revival's in the Air
No.	Title	Writer(s)	Worship leader(s)	Length
1.	"God of Revival"	Phil Wickham; Brian Johnson	Brian Johnson; Jenn Johnson	8:35
2.	"Come Out of that Grave (Resurrection Power)"	B. Johnson; Chris Davenport	Brandon Lake	4:58
3.	"Anything Is Possible"	Hannah McClure; Lake; Dante Bowe; Michaela Gentile	Dante Bowe	4:54
4.	"Reign Above It All"	Paul McClure; H. McClure; Jess Cates; Ethan Hulse	Paul McClure	5:47
5.	"Sing His Praise Again (Oh My Soul)"	Ben Fielding; Jason Ingram; B. Johnson	Jenn Johnson	6:27
6.	"Champion"	Steffany Gretzinger; Tony Brown; Jonathan Jay; Lake; Bowe	Dante Bowe	8:46
7.	"Breathe/Rest (Spontaneous)"	Cory Asbury	Cory Asbury	4:28
8.	"Egypt"	Wickham; B. Johnson; Asbury; Hulse; Lee Cummings	Cory Asbury	6:23
9.	"Revival's in the Air"	Jonathan David Helser; Melissa Helser; Cadence Helser	Melissa Helser	7:24
10.	"My Hands Are Open"	B. Johnson; Leslie Jordan; Josh Baldwin; Hulse; Tim Skipper; Stephanie Skipper	Josh Baldwin	4:24
11.	"I Will Rise"	H. McClure; Kristene DiMarco	Kristene DiMarco	4:34
12.	"We Cry Holy (Spontaneous)"	Jenn Johnson	Jenn Johnson	3:19
13.	"By the Grace of God"	Martin Smith; Tim Hughes; Nick Herbert; B. Johnson; DiMarco	Brian Johnson; Jenn Johnson	6:46
14.	"Prepare the Way"	Chris Cleveland; Hulse; Justin Amundrud; Bethany Wohrle; Bowe	Bethany Wohrle; Dante Bowe	5:21
15.	"Better Than"	J. D. Helser; M. Helser	Jonathan David Helser; Melissa Helser	7:27
16.	"We Praise You"	Matt Redman; Wickham; B. Johnson; Lake	Brandon Lake	6:56
17.	"Always Good"	H. McClure; Rita Springer	Hannah McClure	7:57
Total length:				104:26

- Songwriting credits adapted from PraiseCharts.

== Charts ==
=== Weekly charts ===
Weekly chart performance for Revival's in the Air
Chart (2020)	Peak position
Swiss Albums (Schweizer Hitparade)	43
UK Christian & Gospel Albums (OCC)	3
US Christian Albums (Billboard)	2
US Independent Albums (Billboard)	31
US Top Album Sales (Billboard)	30

=== Year-end charts ===
Year-end chart performance for Revival's in the Air
Chart (2020)	Position
US Christian Albums (Billboard)	52
Chart (2021)	Position
US Christian Albums (Billboard)	41
Chart (2022)	Position
US Christian Albums (Billboard)	43

== Release history ==
Region	Date	Format(s)	Label(s)	Ref.
Various	May 29, 2020	Digital download; streaming	Bethel Music	
