= Where His Light Was =

Studio album by Kristene DiMarco
- Released: September 22, 2017
- Recorded: 2017
- Studio: Bethel Music, Redding, CA; Full Circle Music, Franklin, TN
- Genre: Worship; CCM
- Length: 39:07
- Label: Bethel Music
- Producer: Seth Mosley; Mike "X." O'Connor; Brian Johnson (exec.); Joel Taylor (exec.)

Kristene DiMarco studio album chronology
Safe Place (2012)	Where His Light Was (2017)	The Field (2022)

Kristene DiMarco chronology
Mighty (2015)	Where His Light Was (2017)	The Field (2022)

Singles from Where His Light Was
- 1. "Take Courage" Released: May 8, 2017

Where His Light Was is the third studio album and fourth album overall by American Christian singer Kristene DiMarco. The album was released on September 22, 2017 by Bethel Music, her first release with the record label. Seth Mosley and Mike "X." O'Connor produced the album.

== Background ==
Kristene DiMarco joined the Bethel Music collective in 2016, followed by her appearance on the album Starlight (2017), performing the song "Take Courage" live during the Worship Nights tour in October 2016. In a press release published by Bethel Music through The Media Collective on August 11, 2017, it was announced that her first album with the label will be released on September 22. Kristene DiMarco said of the album,

Where His Light Was comes from the perspective of when you're walking through a hard time, it feels dark, and you can’t see where you're going, but God said go. If you keep moving forward you will reach your destination and realize you were never alone. Through the mystery and unanswered questions, He was with you the entire time. Don’t give up. Keep going.

A short film titled Ever Before Me was published on Bethel Music's YouTube channel, touted as the story behind the album with Kristene DiMarco narrating her experiences in San Francisco, California.

== Promotion ==
On September 1, 2017, Bethel Music announced the start of the digital pre-order of the album, having made three tracks available as pre-order singles prior to the album's release, the songs were "Fear Not", "Hope Is Alive" and "I Am No Victim".

== Singles ==
"Take Courage" was released in digital format on May 8, 2017, as the lead single from the album. The song impacted Christian radio on June 16, 2017.

== Commercial performance ==
Where His Light Was became Kristene DiMarco's first chart-topping release on the United Kingdom's Official Christian & Gospel Albums Chart for the week ending October 5, 2017. In the week ending October 14, 2017, Where His Light Was, was the third best-selling Christian album in the United States as ranked by Billboard. The album also registered on Billboard's Independent Albums chart at number 19.

== Critical reception ==
Professional ratings
Review scores
Source	Rating
365 Days Of Inspiring Media	5/5 stars
Hallels	5/5 stars
Jay's Musik Blog	5/5
Jesus Freak Hideout	4/5 stars

Christian music critic Josh Andre, in his review on 365 Days Of Inspiring Media, rated the album a perfect five stars saying that "Where His Light Was isn't your usual worship album, as it contains plenty of musical genres within this 11 song tracklist, and that's what makes it musically unique, fresh, reinvigorating and diverse." Hallels' Timothy Yap also bestowed the album a five star rating in a superbly positive review, declaring that "Kristene DiMarco has found her niche with album #4." Indicating in a stellar five point score review at Jay's Musik Blog, Jay Wright states, "Where His Light Was is a stunning worship album that focuses listeners on Jesus and remember that He is leading us, even if all we can see is darkness in front of us." Wright concluded on a congratulatory note, saying "Great job, Kristene DiMarco!" Josh Balogh, reviewing the album for Jesus Freak Hideout whilst rating it four stars, says "The message remains on point, striking at the heart of fear by reminding listeners that God is present, we are His children, His light shines into darkness, and His plans are good."

Aaron Lewendon of Eden.co.uk in his review of the album, says "It is a unique release that allows Kristene DiMarco to try new things, to create songs that are memorable, striking, and distinctive without coming across as mere surface." Gateway News' Luchae Williams drew the conclusion that Where His Light Was is "thoughtful and bold, showcasing the singer’s ability to not only pen her own hits but also deliver them in a way that is sincere and honest."

== Track listing ==
Where His Light Was — Standard edition
No.	Title	Writer(s)	Length
1.	"Doxology"	Thomas Ken	0:42
2.	"Where His Light Was"	Kristene DiMarco	1:53
3.	"Fear Not"	K. DiMarco; Seth Mosley; Robby Busick	3:00
4.	"Take Courage (Radio Version)"	K. DiMarco; Jeremy Riddle; Joel Taylor	4:01
5.	"Never Ever"	K. DiMarco; Mosley; Matt Hammitt	3:21
6.	"I Am No Victim"	K. DiMarco; Mosley; Tony Brown	4:41
7.	"Jesus Is Willing" (featuring Tasha Cobbs Leornard)	K. DiMarco; Nate Moore; Hammitt; Mosley; Brown	3:53
8.	"Your Love Stands Alone"	K. DiMarco; Mosley; Mia Fieldes	4:04
9.	"Hope Is Alive"	K. DiMarco; Brian Johnson; Hammitt; Bill Johnson; Sean Feucht	4:31
10.	"Could You Be This Good"	K. DiMarco; Mosley	4:47
11.	"I Just Want to Worship"	K. DiMarco; Mosley; Hammitt; Jordan DiMarco	4:14
Total length:			39:07

== Charts ==
=== Album ===
Chart (2017)	Peak position
Australian Digital Albums (ARIA)	22
UK Official Christian & Gospel Albums (OCC)	1
US Christian Albums (Billboard)	3
US Independent Albums (Billboard)	19

=== Singles ===
Year	Single	Peak positions		
Year	Single	US Christian	Christian Airplay	Christian Digital Songs
2017	"Take Courage"	36	34	20

== Release history ==
Region	Date	Version	Format	Label	Ref.
Worldwide	September 22, 2017	Standard	CD; Digital download; streaming	Bethel Music	
