= You Make Me Brave =

2014 song by Bethel Music and Amanda Lindsey Cook

Single by Bethel Music and Amanda Lindsey Cook

from the album You Make Me Brave: Live at the Civic
- Released: June 17, 2014
- Recorded: 2014
- Genre: Worship; CCM
- Length: 4:02
- Label: Bethel Music
- Songwriter: Amanda Lindsey Cook
- Producers: Gabriel Wilson; Daniel Mackenzie

Bethel Music singles chronology
"Chasing You" (2013)	"You Make Me Brave" (2014)	"It Is Well" (2015)

Amanda Lindsey Cook singles chronology
"You Make Me Brave" (2014)	"Heroes" (2015)

Music videos
- "You Make me Brave" (Live) on YouTube

"You Make Me Brave" is a song performed by Bethel Music and Amanda Lindsey Cook. It was released as the lead single from Bethel Music's ninth album You Make Me Brave: Live at the Civic, on June 17, 2014. Cook wrote the song while Gabriel Wilson and Daniel Mackenzie handled its production.

"You Make Me Brave" peaked at number 16 on the Hot Christian Songs chart in the United States. The song has been certified gold by the Recording Industry Association of America (RIAA). The song received two awards at the 36th Annual GMA Canada Covenant Awards for Song of the Year and Praise and Worship Song of the Year.

== Background ==
On May 28, 2014, Bethel Music announced that "You Make Me Brave" will be slated to impact Christian radio on June 27, 2014. The song was released in digital format on June 17, 2014.

== Composition ==
"You Make Me Brave" is composed in the key of E♭ with a tempo of 69 beats per minute and a musical time signature of 4/4.

== Accolades ==
Awards
Year	Organization	Award	Result	Ref.
2014	GMAC Covenant Awards	Song of the Year	Won	
2014	GMAC Covenant Awards	Praise and Worship Song of the Year	Won	

== Commercial performance ==
"You Make Me Brave" debuted at number 23 on the US Hot Christian Songs chart dated May 10, 2014. The song went on to peak at number 16 and spent a total of twenty-eight non-consecutive weeks on the chart.

== Music video ==
Bethel Music released the live music video for "You Make Me Brave" on their YouTube channel on April 5, 2014, with Amanda Lindsey Cook leading the song.

== Charts ==
=== Weekly charts ===
Weekly chart performance for "You Make Me Brave"
Chart (2014)	Peak position
US Hot Christian Songs (Billboard)	16
US Christian Airplay (Billboard)	20

=== Year-end charts ===
Year-end chart performance for "You Make Me Brave"
Chart (2014)	Position
US Christian Songs (Billboard)	48
US Christian CHR Songs (Billboard)	33

== Certifications ==
Region	Certification	Certified units/sales
United States (RIAA)	Gold	500,000^{‡}
^{‡} Sales+streaming figures based on certification alone.

== Release history ==
Region	Date	Format	Label	Ref.
Various	June 17, 2014	Digital download; streaming	Bethel Music	
Various	June 27, 2014	Christian radio	Bethel Music	

== Other versions ==
- WorshipMob released their own cover of "You Make Me Brave" on their debut album, Carry the Fire (2015).
- Shane & Shane released their own rendition of the song on their album, The Worship Initiative (2015).
- Bethel Music released an instrumental remix of the song on their instrumental album, Without Words: Synesthesia (2015).
- Bethel Music Kids released their own version of the song on their debut album, Come Alive (2015).
