= Mighty (Kristene DiMarco album) =

Live album by Kristene DiMarco
- Released: July 31, 2015
- Genre: CCM; worship
- Length: 55:53
- Label: Jesus Culture Music; Sparrow
- Producer: Jeremy Edwardson; Jeffrey Kunde

Kristene DiMarco chronology
Safe Place (2012)	Mighty (2015)	Where His Light Was (2017)

Singles from Mighty
- 1. "I Will Follow You" Released: June 23, 2015; 2. "Jesus, Your Love" Released: July 17, 2015; 3. "Eyes on You" Released: July 24, 2015

Mighty is the third album from Kristene DiMarco, and her first live album. It was released by Jesus Culture Music and Sparrow Records on July 31, 2015. Jeremy Edwardson and Jeffrey Kunde worked on the album's production.

== Critical reception ==
Professional ratings
Review scores
Source	Rating
CCM Magazine	3/5 stars
The Christian Manifesto	4/5 stars
Christian Music Review	3.7/5
Cross Rhythms	10/10 squares
New Release Today	3.5/5 stars 4.5/5 stars
Worship Leader	3.5/5 stars

Jamie Walker of CCM Magazine gave the album a three-star review, stating that "lovers of her powerful worship leading will be delighted with what they find here." Caitlin Lassiter rated it three and a half stars in New Release Today, writing, "Lyrically, Mighty is a strong and worshipful effort, but sonically, things often fall short of expectation." Giving a rating of 3.7 out of five at Christian Music Review, Laura Chambers' view was that "Every song resonates with a calm, assured mood, underscoring the peace we can experience if we trust Him in all things." Calvin Moore, awarding the album four stars in The Christian Manifesto, says, "Mighty is an excellent live worship experience featuring evocative songs, strong music, and powerful vocals." Giving the album four and a half stars at New Release Today, Kevin Davis states, "These excellent songs are all prayers, adorations and declarations about our great God, who is mighty to save." Amanda Furbeck gave a three and a half star review for Worship Leader, stating, "Mighty showcases Kristene DiMarco’s talents as a singer/songwriter with 11 original songs interspersed with the familiar strains of a few traditional hymns." In a ten out of ten review at Cross Rhythms, Stephen Luff stated, "This is an amazing release from one of the most gifted singer/songwriters in the whole of modern worship."

== Awards and accolades ==
This album was No. 16, on the Worship Leader's Top 20 Albums of 2015 list.

The song, "Eyes On You", was No. 13, on the Worship Leader's Top 20 Songs of 2015 list.

== Track listing ==
Mighty
No.	Title	Writer(s)	Length
1.	"Jesus, Your Love"	Evangeline Sperti; Holli Johnson	7:16
2.	"Eyes on You"	Matt Armstrong; Josh Silverberg; Kristene DiMarco	5:08
3.	"Be Still"	Katie Torwalt; Bryan Torwalt; DiMarco	3:57
4.	"Mighty"	Junior Garr; DiMarco; Lindsey Sweat	4:56
5.	"I Will Follow You"	DiMarco	4:27
6.	"It Is Well"	DiMarco	7:18
7.	"Song of Your Love"	DiMarco	3:25
8.	"Carry Me"	DiMarco	4:12
9.	"Lily's Song (Praise the Lord)"	DiMarco	7:03
10.	"Wonderful"	Sarah Reeves; DiMarco; Christa Black Gifford; David Moffit	4:10
11.	"Over and Over Again"	DiMarco	4:01
Total length:			55:53

== Charts ==
Chart (2015)	Peak position
US Billboard 200	169
US Christian Albums (Billboard)	7
