= Cain (American band) =

Contemporary Christian group

- Origin: Hartselle, Alabama, U.S.
- Genre: Contemporary Christian music
- Years active: 2012–present
- Label: Provident Label Group
- Members: Taylor Cain; Madison Cain; Logan Cain
- Website: Official website

Cain (stylized in all caps as CAIN) is a contemporary Christian music trio composed of siblings Taylor, Madison, and Logan Cain. They are signed with Provident Label Group.

== Origin ==
Taylor, Madison, and Logan Cain grew up in Alabama, where their dad was the pastor of a Pentecostal church. The trio's musical career got an early start when, at four years old, Taylor Cain wrote a Christmas song for them to sing in three-part harmony.

All three were home schooled until they were teenagers, eventually attending their local public high school. After high school, the siblings all attended Troy University in Troy, Alabama. In 2012, the trio entered a contest to open for singer-songwriter Dave Barnes. After winning, they each quit their jobs and moved to Nashville.

== Band members ==
- Taylor Cain Matz - lead vocals, guitar, keyboards
- Logan William Cain - lead vocals, guitar
- Madison Cain Johnson - bass guitar, backing vocals

== Career ==
Cain signed with Provident Label Group, releasing their first EP for the label in early 2020. Not long after the initial release, the EP logged more than 2.5 million streams and brought them to having a single listed on Christian radio charts. The single, "Rise Up (Lazarus)" became a top 10 hit, eventually reaching No. 1 on Billboard's Airplay Chart; the track spent four weeks topping the Billboard Audience based radio chart. The group also recorded a version of "Rise Up (Lazarus)" with Zach Williams.

CAIN was nominated for the We Love Christian Music Awards' Best New Artist of the Year in 2021 and, after nomination, won the K-Love 2021 Fan Award for Breakout Single for the song "Rise Up (Lazarus)". as well as headlining their own nationwide tour in 2023. CAIN's "Live In Color" tour also featured David Leonard and Katy Nichole with 33 cities booked for small to medium venues during Fall 2023. Beginning in January 2024, CAIN joined Jam Nation's "Winter Jam Tour" with Crowder, Katy Nichole, and Newsong for concerts through March 2024 in the southern and midwest U.S. The group toured with Chris Tomlin during his "Holy Forever Tour" from April through May 2024. Cain opened for Zach Williams on his 2024 Revival Nights tour. Next, Cain joined Tomlin, before finishing 2024 tour season on the Hits1 tour.

== Discography ==
=== Studio albums ===
List of studio albums, with selected chart positions and certifications
Title	Album details	Peak chart positions		Certifications	Album sales
Title	Album details	US	US Christ.	Certifications	Album sales
Rise Up	Release date: May 7, 2021; Label: Provident, Sony; Formats: CD, DL	— (Note: "Rise Up" did not enter the Billboard 200, but peaked at No. 93 on the Billboard Top Current Album Sales)	6		
Jesus Music	Release date: October 13, 2023; Label: Provident, Sony; Formats: CD, DL	— (Note: "Jesus Music" did not enter the Billboard 200, but peaked at No. 36 on the Billboard Top Album Sales and No. 28 on the Billboard Top Current Album Sales)	2		
Paradise	Release date: March 5, 2027; Label: Provident, Sony; Formats: CD, DL	To be released			

=== EPs ===
Cain (Independent, 2015)

- Peaked at No. 41 on the Billboard Top Christian Albums

Cain (Provident, 2020)

Wonderful (Provident, 2021)

Honest Offering (Provident, 2023)

- Peaked at No. 48 on the Billboard Top Christian Albums

=== Singles ===
==== As main artist ====
List of singles and peak chart positions
Single	Year	Peak Chart Positions						Certifications	Album
Single	Year	US	US Christ	US Christ. Airplay	US Christ. AC	US Christ. Digital	US Christ. Stream.	Certifications	Album
"Rise Up (Lazarus)"	2020	— (Note: "Rise Up (Lazarus)" did not enter the Billboard Hot 100, but peaked at No. 19 on the Billboard Bubbling Under Hot 100)	4	1	1	7	11	RIAA: Gold	Rise Up
"Never Lost" (with Essential Worship; Elevation Worship cover)	2020	—	—	—	—	—	—		Non-album singles
"Great Things" (with Essential Worship; Phil Wickham cover)	2020	—	—	—	—	—	—		Non-album singles
"Celebrate Me Home" (Kenny Loggins cover)	2020	—	31	10	4	—	—		Non-album singles
"There Was Jesus" (Zach Williams & Dolly Parton cover)	2020	—	—	—	—	—	—		Non-album singles
"Egypt" (with Essential Worship; Bethel Music and Cory Asbury cover)	2021	—	—	—	—	—	—		Non-album singles
"Wonderful" (with Steven Curtis Chapman)	2021	—	18	4	3	18	—		Wonderful (EP)
"Yes He Can"	2021	—	5	1	1	18	—	RIAA: Gold	Rise Up
"The Commission"	2021	—	2	4	4	2	14	RIAA: Gold	Rise Up
"I'm So Blessed"	2022	—	3	8	7	3	11	RIAA: Gold	Rise Up
"Desert Road" (with Casting Crowns)	2022	—	18	—	—	—	—		Non-album single
"(Christmas) Baby Please Come Home" (featuring Ben Fuller)	2022	—	—	9	16	—	—		Non-album single
"Any More"	2023	—	8	5	4	—	—		Jesus Music
"Praise Opens Prison Doors"	2023	—	40	—	—	—	—		Honest Offering
"Honest Offering/I Surrender"	2023	—	43	43	—	—	—		Honest Offering
"I'm So Blessed (Kid's Version)"	2024	—	—	—	—	—	—		Non-album singles
"Friend in Jesus"	2024	—	30	17	14	—	—		Non-album singles
"I Made It"	2025	—	39	26	26	—	—		Non-album singles
"Jesus Lifted Me" (featuring Brooke Ligertwood)	2025	—	47	—	—	—	—		Non-album singles
"Living Water"	2026	—	27	17	17	—	—		Paradise
"My Victory's Coming"	2026	—	—	—	—	—	—		Paradise
"Thank You For My Whole Life"	2026	—	41	—	—	—	—		Paradise

==== As featured artist ====
List of singles and peak chart positions
Single	Year	Peak chart positions	Album
Single	Year	US Christ.	Album
"Safe and Sound" (Forrest Frank with CAIN)	2024	15	Child of God
"Somebody Like Me" (Caleb & John with CAIN)	2024	11	

== Awards and nominations ==
=== American Music Awards ===
Year	Nominee / work	Award	Result
2021	Cain	Favorite Artist – Contemporary Inspirational	Nominated

=== GMA Dove Awards ===
Year	Nominee / work	Award	Result	Ref.
2021	Cain	New Artist of the Year	Nominated	
2022	Rise Up	Pop/Contemporary Album of the Year	Nominated	
2022	Rise Up	Recorded Music Packaging of the Year	Nominated	
2022	Wonderful	Christmas/Special Event Album of the Year	Nominated	
