= Yes He Can =

2021 single by Cain

Single by Cain

from the album Rise Up
- Released: April 16, 2021
- Recorded: 2020
- Genre: CCM; Christian country
- Length: 3:18
- Label: Provident Label Group
- Songwriters: Jeff Pardo; Logan Cain; Madison Cain; Taylor Cain
- Producer: Jeff Pardo

Cain singles chronology
"Egypt" (2021)	"Yes He Can" (2021)	"Wonderful" (2021)

Music videos
- "Yes He Can" on YouTube
- "Yes He Can" (Acoustic) on YouTube
- "Yes He Can" (Song Session) on YouTube

"Yes He Can" is a song performed by American Christian country band Cain. The song impacted Christian radio in the United States on April 17, 2020, as the second single from their debut studio album, Rise Up (2021). The song was written by Jeff Pardo, Logan Cain, Madison Cain, Nick Schwarz, and Taylor Cain. Jeff Pardo produced the single.

"Yes He Can" peaked at No. 5 on the US Hot Christian Songs chart.

== Background ==
On March 20, 2021, the radio team of Provident Label Group announced that "Yes He Can" will be serviced to Christian radio in the United States, the official add date for the single slated on April 16, 2021. Taylor Cain shared the story behind the song, saying:

I think in scripture that's what God does all the time. He always pulls us back and says remember I am the God who let you out of Egypt, who saved your people. He reminds us all the time of the things that He's done and I think it just naturally builds your faith as a by product. The best way to have faith through future is to look back and remember what all God has done.

== Composition ==
"Yes He Can" is composed in the key of E♭ with a tempo of 84 beats per minute and a musical time signature of 4/4.

== Music videos ==
The official audio video of "Yes He Can" was published on Cain's YouTube channel on March 6, 2020. The Song Session video of the song was availed by Essential Worship on March 25, 2020, to YouTube. The official music video for "Yes He Can" was availed by Cain on April 2, 2021, to YouTube. The official acoustic performance video of the song was published by Cain on YouTube on April 23, 2021.

== Charts ==
=== Weekly charts ===
Weekly chart performance for "Yes He Can"
Chart (2021)	Peak position
US Christian Songs (Billboard)	4
US Christian Airplay (Billboard)	1
US Christian AC (Billboard)	1

=== Year-end charts ===
Year-end chart performance for "Yes He Can"
Chart (2021)	Position
US Christian Songs (Billboard)	32
US Christian Airplay (Billboard)	3
US Christian AC (Billboard)	7

== Release history ==
Release history and formats for "Yes He Can"
Region	Date	Version	Format	Label	Ref.
United States	April 16, 2021	Album	Christian radio	Provident Label Group	
