= WorshipMob =

American worship music collective

- Also known as: Worship Mob
- Origin: Colorado Springs, Colorado
- Genres: worship
- Years active: 2011–present
- Labels: Integrity Music (formerly), Watershed Music Group (current)
- Members: Sean Mulholland; 70-80 ministry leaders
- Website: worshipmob.com

WorshipMob is an American worship music collective from Colorado Springs, Colorado, and they were formed on March 15, 2011 by Sean Mulholland. They were signed to the Integrity Music label, releasing their first studio album, Carry the Fire, in 2015. This album was their breakthrough release upon the Billboard magazine Christian Albums and Heatseekers Albums charts.

== Music history ==
The collective's music recording career commenced in 2015, with the studio album, Carry the Fire, and it was released on March 3, 2015 by Integrity Music. This album was their breakthrough release upon the Billboard magazine charts, where it placed on the Christian Albums chart at No. 33 and on the Heatseekers Albums chart at No. 24.

== Members ==
- Sean Mulholland
- 70-80 ministry leaders from 30 local churches

== Discography ==
List of studio albums, with selected chart positions
Title	Album details	Peak chart positions	
Title	Album details	US Chr	US Heat
Carry The Fire	Released: March 3, 2015; Label: Integrity; cd, digital download	33	24
