= Carry the Fire (WorshipMob album) =

Studio album by WorshipMob
- Released: March 3, 2015
- Genre: worship
- Length: 73:42
- Label: Integrity

Carry the Fire is the first studio album by WorshipMob. Integrity Music released the album on March 3, 2015.

== Critical reception ==
Professional ratings
Review scores
Source	Rating
365 Days of Inspiring Media	4/5 stars
CCM Magazine	4/5 stars
Christian Music Review	3.7/5
Christian Review Magazine	4/5 stars
CM Addict	3.5/5 stars
Cross Rhythms	9/10 squares
Louder Than the Music	5/5 stars
New Release Tuesday	3.5/5 stars
Worship Leader	4/5 stars

Awarding the album four stars for CCM Magazine, Matt Conner writes, the "originals ... shine brightest." Kristen Gilles, rating the album four stars at Worship Leader, says, "Anthemic pop arrangements support scripted and spontaneous songs of praise and prayer" are on the album. Indicating in a three and a half star review, Mary Nikkel of New Release Tuesday, states, "The heavily collaborative approach to this album makes it unique listening experience that is truly conducive to allowing God to take center stage." Christian St. John, mentioning in a four star review from Christian Review Magazine, says, "Carry the Fire is a refreshing, passionate, and authentic work of worship". Rating the album a nine out of ten at Cross Rhythms, Stephen Luff writes, "the album feels very imitate and personal."

Joshua Andre, awarding the album four star at 365 Days of Inspiring Media, states, "they make their sounds their own as well, and the covers are very unique." Rating the album three and a half stars for CM Addict, Brianne Bellomy writes, "this is a great first album that truly represents who Worshipmob is." Christian Music Review rating the album a 3.7 out of five, Logan Merrick says, he found, "this album to be a refreshing worship experience—full of truth, passion and love for the Father." Signaling in a five star review from Louder Than the Music, Jono Davies states, "It feels new and fresh and the group has a bunch of guys who have poured their hearts and souls into producing music that really grabs at the heart of our Savior."

== Accolades ==
This album was No. 20, on the Worship Leader's Top 20 Albums of 2015 list.

== Track listing ==
No.	Title	Length
1.	"Satisfy"	9:57
2.	"Our Father Has Won"	5:15
3.	"Arrested by Grace"	6:56
4.	"We Are Yours"	5:12
5.	"Love Outran Me"	7:34
6.	"You Make Me Brave"	6:06
7.	"Downpour"	5:58
8.	"Here with You"	2:59
9.	"More & More of You"	4:35
10.	"Light Up the World"	4:55
11.	"Oceans/Nothing but the Blood"	10:37
12.	"Love Break Down These Walls"	3:39
Total length:		73:42

== Charts ==
Chart (2015)	Peak position
US Top Christian Albums (Billboard)	33
US Heatseekers Albums (Billboard)	24
