= We Praise You =

2020 song by Bethel Music and Brandon Lake

Single by Bethel Music and Brandon Lake

from the album Revival's in the Air
- Released: March 6, 2020
- Recorded: 2019
- Venue: Bethel Church, Redding, California, U.S.
- Genre: Contemporary worship music
- Length: 6:55 (live version); 3:40 (studio version)
- Label: Bethel Music
- Songwriters: Brandon Lake; Brian Johnson; Matt Redman; Phil Wickham
- Producers: Brian Johnson; Joel Taylor

Bethel Music singles chronology
"God of Revival" (2020)	"We Praise You" (2020)	"Egypt" (2020)

Brandon Lake singles chronology
"This Is a Move" (2019)	"We Praise You" (2020)	"We Are the Kingdom" (2020)

Studio version
- Studio version

Music video
- "We Praise You" (Live) on YouTube

"We Praise You" is a song by Bethel Music and Brandon Lake, which was released as the second single from Bethel Music's twelfth live album, Revival's in the Air (2020), on March 6, 2020. The song was written by Lake, Brian Johnson, Matt Redman, Phil Wickham. Brian Johnson also collaborated on the production of the single with Joel Taylor.

== Background ==
The live version of "We Praise You" was recorded at Bethel Church, featuring Brandon Lake as worship leader, was released on March 6, 2020, as the second single from the album, Revival's in the Air, which at the time, was being marketed under the name God of Revival. Lake spoke of the single, saying "Praise isn’t just something we give as a gift to God, it’s something that can make things shift—it’s a weapon. Even if it doesn’t change the situation, praise can shift my perspective. It can take my eyes off the storm and put them on Christ."

The studio version of "We Praise You" was released in digital format on March 27, 2020. The song impacted Christian radio stations on May 15, 2020.

== Composition ==
"We Praise You" is composed in the key of A with a tempo of 85.5 beats per minute and a musical time signature of 4/4.

== Commercial performance ==
"We Praise You" debuted at number 48 on the US Christian Airplay chart. The song went on to peak at number 46 and has spent a total of eight consecutive weeks on the chart.

== Music video ==
Bethel Music released the live music video of "We Praise You" with Brandon Lake leading the song during the WorshipU 2019 conference held at Bethel Church through their YouTube channel on March 6, 2020.

== Track listing ==
"We Praise You" (Live)
No.	Title	Length
1.	"We Praise You" (Live)	6:56

"We Praise You" (Studio Version)
No.	Title	Length
1.	"We Praise You" (Studio Version)	3:40

== Charts ==
Chart (2020)	Peak position
US Christian Airplay (Billboard)	46

== Release history ==
Region	Date	Version	Format	Label	Ref.
Various	March 6, 2020	Live	Digital download; streaming	Bethel Music	
Various	March 27, 2020	Studio Version	Digital download; streaming	Bethel Music	
United States	May 15, 2020	Studio Version	Christian radio	Bethel Music	

== Other versions ==
- On January 10, 2020, Matt Redman released his rendition of "We Praise You" featuring Brandon Lake on his album, Let There Be Wonder (2020).
