= Starlight (Bethel Music album) =

Live album by Bethel Music
- Released: April 7, 2017
- Recorded: October 2016
- Venue: Various cities of the East Coast, U.S.
- Genre: Worship; contemporary Christian music
- Length: 76:53
- Label: Bethel Music
- Producer: Chris Greely; Ran Jackson

Bethel Music live album chronology
Have It All (2016)	Starlight (2017)	Moments: Mighty Sound (2018)

Bethel Music chronology
Have It All (2016)	Starlight (2017)	After All These Years (Instrumental) (2017)

Singles from Starlight
- 1. "Take Courage" Released: May 8, 2017

Starlight (stylized as star-light) is the ninth live album and thirteenth album overall by California-based worship collective Bethel Music. The album was released on April 7, 2017, by the group's imprint label, Bethel Music. Chris Greely and Ran Jackson worked on the production of the album.

== Background ==
Starlight was recorded in October 2016 when Bethel Music went on a Worship Nights Tour, ministering in cities across the East Coast of the United States with guest worship leader, Francesca Battistelli, and guest speakers Lisa Bevere and Havilah Cunnington.

== Promotion ==
Three songs, "Starlight" by Amanda Cook, "Take Courage" by Kristene DiMarco and "King of My Heart" by Steffany Gretzinger and Jeremy Riddle were made available for instant download on March 17, 2017, the first day of the pre-order period in the lead up to the album's release.

== Singles ==
A studio version of "Take Courage" was released in digital format as the lead single from the album on May 8, 2017. The song then impacted Christian radio on June 16, 2017.

== Critical reception ==
Professional ratings
Review scores
Source	Rating
365 Days of Inspiring Media	4.5/5 stars
CCM Magazine	4.5/5 stars
The Christian Beat	4.5/5 stars
ChurchMag	5/5 stars
Hallels	4/5 stars
Jesus Freak Hideout	4/5 stars
NewReleaseToday	4.5/5 stars
Today's Christian Entertainment	4.4/5 stars

The reception of Starlight was quite positive from various critics of CCM and contemporary worship music genres.

Joshua Andre designated the album a four and a half star rating at 365 Days of Inspiring Media, calling Starlight "a brilliant album for a well-respected church and group!" At CCM Magazine, Matt Conner rated the album four-point-five stars out of five, he cautions that "the entire album warrants repeated listens." Rating the album four and a half stars in a review at The Christian Beat, Madeleine Dittmer believes that "Starlight conveys a message of hope that God is near in our joy and in our darkness. The songs provide a way for listeners to worship in all seasons of life by proclaiming truth and providing words for moments when they may be hard to find. Bethel Music has yet again released a powerful collection that will have a lasting impact on listeners." Bestowing the album a perfect five stars in a ChurchMag review, Phil Schneider says "One thing I've learned is that there are two main camps of worship music: the anthemic and the contemplative. However, Bethel Music is forcing me to unlearn this with their new album Starlight, which boasts contemplative melodies and anthemic lyrics. The combination of this pairing produces a worship experience that brings peace to the soul while fueling the dissatisfaction that points the soul to the eternal, Almighty God, who created, sustains, and passionately pursues us." Timothy Yap of Hallels gave Starlight a four star rating in his review, concluding that "On the whole, "Starlight" does glow with some very powerful worship moments, though not all the "stars" shine with the same intensity. Nevertheless, this is an important album. It doesn't take a prophet to predict that just as ubiquitous as the stars are, these songs are going to find their places in tomorrow's worship of the church." Jesus Freak Hideout's Josh Balogh says in his four star review: "Musically, the use of strings and synthesizer-flourishes really stand out, and created a paradox of intimacy and vastness in the majority of the songs. Lyrically, there was a deep focus on the name and worthiness of Jesus, which is right where the focus should be. All told, we have a more-than-worthy addition to the Bethel Music canon and a few new songs with which to praise our very Holy God." Awarding the album four and a half stars from NewReleaseToday, Kevin Davis states, "Starlight is best described as a stellar worship offering with an empowering theme of the Lord's Kingship reigning in our hearts in song after song." Laura Chambers, indicating in a four-and-two-fifths star review at Today's Christian Entertainment, says "Starlight's thoughtful lyrics will inspire gratitude long after the music ends. Bethel Music's stirring melodies draw listeners into the marvelous strength of God and invite them to consider Him as both powerful and personal, loyal and loving."

== Commercial performance ==
In the week ending April 13, 2017, 20,000 equivalent album units of Starlight were sold. The album rose to No. 1 on the Billboard Christian Albums chart dated April 29, 2017. The album also made its debut on the ARIA Albums Chart at No. 15, becoming the fourth album by Bethel Music to do so. Concurrently, the song "Extravagant", which featured Steffany Gretzinger and Amanda Cook, debuted at No. 30 on the Billboard's Hot Christian Songs chart and No. 23 on the Christian Digital Songs chart with 2,000 downloads sold.

== Track listing ==
Standard edition
No.	Title	Writer(s)	Worship leader(s)	Length
1.	"Starlight"	Bobby Strand; Amanda Cook; Lindsey Strand; Brian Johnson	Amanda Cook	5:37
2.	"There's No Other Name"	Hannah McClure; Francesca Battistelli; B. Johnson; Paul McClure	Francesca Battistelli	5:40
3.	"Extravagant"	Steffany Gretzinger; Cook; Sean Feucht; Ran Jackson	Steffany Gretzinger; Amanda Cook	6:11
4.	"Breathe" (Spontaneous)	Cook	Amanda Cook	3:25
5.	"Take Courage"	Kristene DiMarco; Jeremy Riddle; Joel Taylor	Kristene DiMarco	6:18
6.	"King of My Heart"	John Mark McMillan; Sarah McMillan	Steffany Gretzinger; Jeremy Riddle	4:59
7.	"God I Look to You"	Jenn Johnson; Ian McIntosh	Francesca Battistelli	6:25
8.	"The War Is Over"	B. Strand; Josh Baldwin	Kalley Heiligenthal	8:09
9.	"I See the Light" (Spontaneous)	Kalley Heiligenthal	Kalley Heiligenthal	3:37
10.	"Catch the Wind"	Melissa Helser; Jonathan David Helser; Molly Skaggs; Ed Cash	Melissa Helser	6:49
11.	"Old for New"	H. McClure; Riddle; P. McClure; Rick Seibold	Hannah McClure	3:48
12.	"For the One"	J. Johnson; P. McClure	Jenn Johnson	3:47
13.	"You Came (Lazarus)"	M. Helser; J.D. Helser; Cash	Amanda Cook	4:14
14.	"Extravagant" (Acoustic)	Gretzinger; Cook; Feucht; Jackson	Steffany Gretzinger; Amanda Cook	7:54
Total length:				76:53

== Personnel ==
Adapted from AllMusic.

- Josh Baldwin — background vocals
- Francesca Battistelli — vocals
- Jesse Carmichael — additional production
- Tyler Chester — keyboards
- Amanda Cook — background vocals, vocals
- Kristene DiMarco — vocals
- Chris Estes — director
- Steffany Frizzell-Gretzinger — background vocals, vocals
- Kiley Goodpasture — creative director
- Chris Greely — engineer, guitar, keyboards, mixing engineer, producer
- Stephen James Hart — visual worship leader + design
- Kalley Heiligenthal — background vocals, vocals
- Jonathan David Helser — background vocals
- Melissa Helser — vocals
- Luke Hendrickson — keyboards
- Ran Jackson — background vocals, engineer, guitar, keyboards, percussion, producer
- Ricky Jackson — additional production
- Ted Jansen — mastering
- Brian Johnson — background vocals, executive producer
- Jenn Johnson — executive producer, vocals
- Taylor Johnson — guitar
- Jeremy Larson — strings
- Dan Mackenzie — additional production
- Hannah McClure — vocals
- Paul McClure — background vocals
- Matt Ogden — additional production, background vocals, bass, keyboards
- Michael Pope — guitar
- Aaron Redfield — percussion
- Jeremy Riddle — background vocals, vocals
- Lucas Sankey — photography
- Rick Seibold — additional production
- Bobby Strand — guitar
- Joel Taylor — executive producer
- Jonah Thompson — monitor engineer, track engineer
- Rebekah Van Tinteren — strings
- Joe Volk — drums, percussion
- David Whitworth — drums

== Charts ==
=== Weekly charts ===
Chart (2017)	Peak position
Australian Albums (ARIA)	15
Canadian Albums (Billboard)	26
Dutch Albums (Album Top 100)	100
New Zealand Albums (RMNZ)	25
Scottish Albums (OCC)	60
UK Albums (OCC)	78
UK Christian & Gospel Albums (OCC)	1
US Billboard 200	21
US Christian Albums (Billboard)	1
US Digital Albums (Billboard)	3
US Independent Albums (Billboard)	4

=== Year-end charts ===
Chart (2017)	Position
US Christian Albums (Billboard)	31
US Independent Albums (Billboard)	46
Chart (2018)	Position
US Christian Albums (Billboard)	38

== Release history ==
Region	Date	Version	Format	Label	Ref.
Worldwide	April 7, 2017	Standard	CD; digital download; streaming	Bethel Music	
