= The Way Home (The McClures album) =

2019 studio album by The McClures

Studio album by The McClures
- Released: August 30, 2019
- Recorded: 2019
- Studio: Layman Drug Company, Nashville, Tennessee, U.S.
- Genre: Contemporary worship; country; indie; Americana; folk
- Length: 39:44
- Label: Bethel Music
- Producer: David Leonard

The McClures chronology
The Way Home (2019)	Christmas Morning (Live) (2020)

Singles from The Way Home
- 1. "Now I See" Released: July 12, 2019; 2. "Only Have One" Released: August 16, 2019; 3. "Reign Above It All" Released: February 12, 2021

The Way Home is the debut studio album by American contemporary worship duo The McClures. Bethel Music released the album on August 30, 2019. The album contains guest appearances by Rita Springer and David Leonard. The album was produced by David Leonard.

The album was supported by the release of "Now I See", "Only Have One", and "Reign Above It All" as singles. The album debuted at number 36 on the US Top Christian Albums chart.

== Background ==
The McClures initially announced that they would be released their debut studio album, The Way Home, at the 2019 WorshipU conference hosted by Bethel Music. The album began the songwriting process for the album at a Nashville retreat in December 2016, as the duo enlisted songwriters like Joel Taylor, Rita Springer, Seth Mosley, Matt Hammitt, Mia Fieldes and Ethan Hulse among others. The album was recorded at the Layman Drug Company in Nashville, Tennessee.

The title of the album, The Way Home comes from the title track, which the duo had originally written with Josh Baldwin for his album. Paul McClure said "He [Josh Baldwin] played it a lot, and every time he played it, he said to us, "It feels like your song." It was a last-minute addition and we didn’t even think of it being the title track until we were in Nashville. It's the theme of our season because we are returning home and remembering who we are and these songs are a reflection of that. We recorded that song first and it set the direction for the rest of the songs."

== Music and lyrics ==
Paul McClure described the album as a blend of "worship, country, indie, Americana, and folk," reflecting the duo's North Carolinian roots.

== Release and promotion ==
The McClures made announced their career debut on Bethel Music with the release of "Now I See" on July 12, 2019, as the lead single from The Way Home. "Now I See" was impacted Christian radio in the United States on August 9, 2019.

On August 16, 2019, The McClures released "Only Have One" as the second single from The Way Home. "Only Have One" debuted at number 49 on the Billboard Hot Christian Songs Chart dated September 10, 2019.

On February 12, 2021, the duo released "Reign Above It All" as their third single from the album.

== Critical reception ==
In a positive review from NewReleaseToday, Mark Ryan states, "The Way Home is less a typical corporate worship album and more of a personal time of prayer and reflection album and it is in these personal times where we can stop and hear the voice of God as he gently whispers to us to give us the direction we need in our lives." Gateway News' Luchae Williams gave a positive review of the album, saying "Through this album, the McClures have found a way to share their testimony of a God who is in it for the long haul and always eager to help you discover the way home."

== Commercial performance ==
In the United States, The Way Home debuted at number 36 on the Billboard Top Christian Albums chart dated September 14, 2019. The album also launched at number 31 on the Independent Albums chart, and number 11 on the Heatseekers Albums chart.

== Track listing ==
The Way Home
No.	Title	Writer(s)	Length
1.	"Now I See"	Ed Cash; Brian Johnson; Hannah McClure; Paul McClure; Joel Taylor	4:03
2.	"Only Have One"	Matt Hammitt; H. McClure; P. McClure; Seth Mosley	3:06
3.	"Believe in You"	David Leonard; H. McClure; P. McClure	3:55
4.	"Gone"	Cash; H. McClure; P. McClure; J. Taylor; Paul Taylor	2:58
5.	"Always Good" (featuring Rita Springer)	H. McClure; Rita Springer	4:43
6.	"Tender Hurricane" (featuring David Leonard)	Tony Wood; H. McClure; P. McClure; J. Taylor	3:35
7.	"Great Grace"	Wood; Johnson; H. McClure; P. McClure; J. Taylor	4:12
8.	"Holding on to You"	Mia Fieldes; H. McClure; P. McClure; Jonathan Smith	5:04
9.	"The Way Home"	H. McClure; P. McClure; Josh Baldwin; Ethan Hulse	3:37
10.	"Reign Above It All"	H. McClure; P. McClure; Jess Cates; Ethan Hulse	4:31
Total length:			39:44

The Way Home (Deluxe) — Apple Music exclusive
No.	Title	Length
11.	"Now I See" (Live)	4:04
12.	"Now I See" (Live Music Video)	4:06
Total length:		47:54

- Songwriting credits adapted from PraiseCharts.

== Charts ==
Chart performance for The Way Home
Chart (2019)	Peak position
US Christian Albums (Billboard)	36
US Heatseekers Albums (Billboard)	11
US Independent Albums (Billboard)	31

== Release history ==
Region	Date	Version	Format	Label	Ref.
Various	August 30, 2019	Standard	CD; digital download; streaming	Bethel Music	
Various	August 30, 2019	Deluxe (Apple Music exclusive)	Digital download; streaming	Bethel Music	
