= Champion (Bethel Music and Dante Bowe song) =

2020 song by Bethel Music and Dante Bowe

Single by Bethel Music and Dante Bowe

from the album Revival's in the Air
- Released: July 17, 2020
- Recorded: 2019
- Genre: Contemporary worship music
- Length: 3:57
- Label: Bethel Music
- Songwriters: Brandon Lake; Dante Bowe; Jonathan Jay; Steffany Gretzinger; Tony Brown
- Producer: Chuck Butler

Bethel Music singles chronology
"Egypt" (2020)	"Champion" (2020)	"Revival's in the Air" (2020)

Dante Bowe singles chronology
"There Is a Power" (2020)	"Champion" (2020)	"Don't Talk About It" (2020)

Music videos
- "Champion" (Live) on YouTube
- "Champion" (Alternate) on YouTube

"Champion" is a song by Bethel Music and Dante Bowe, which was released as the fourth single from Bethel Music's twelfth live album, Revival's in the Air (2020), on July 17, 2020. The song was written by Brandon Lake, Dante Bowe, Jonathan Jay, Steffany Gretzinger, and Tony Brown. Chuck Butler handled the production of the single.

== Background ==
On May 15, 2020, Bethel Music launched the pre-order of Revival's in the Air with the release of "Champion" as the first promotional single, along with the song's accompanying live music video. Dante Bowe shared the story behind of the song, saying:

The inspiration for "Champion" came from a conversation with friends about identity, what the Father has done for us and our awareness of that. This song is personal, not just for me, but for anyone who’s ever felt the pressure to measure up or has felt lesser than. We all, at some point in our lives, walk through a season of insecurity and doubt in what the Lord has already spoken. Even when we know what He says, it seems unfair for a good God to still esteem and give power to those who were once sinners. Once we understand His Lordship and Kingship, we realize just how powerful we are as joint heirs with Christ. We didn’t work for it. We didn’t earn it. It’s just simply our inheritance. Once a generation knows that, everything changes.

The studio-recorded version of "Champion" was released in digital format on July 17, 2020. The song then impacted Christian radio in the United States on August 7, 2020.

== Composition ==
"Champion" is composed in the key of B♭ with a tempo of 72 beats per minute and a musical time signature of 6/8.

== Commercial performance ==
"Champion" debuted at number 32 on the US Hot Christian Songs chart. The song spent seven weeks on the chart.

== Music videos ==
Bethel Music released the live music video of "Champion" with Dante Bowe leading the song at Bethel Church through their YouTube channel on May 15, 2020. On July 20, 2020, the alternate music video of the song was published by Bethel Music on their YouTube channel.

== Charts ==
Chart (2020–2022)	Peak position
US Hot Christian Songs (Billboard)	28
US Christian Airplay (Billboard)	45

== Release history ==
Region	Date	Format	Label	Ref.
Various	May 15, 2020	Digital download (promotional release); streaming (promotional release)	Bethel Music	
Various	July 17, 2020	Digital download; streaming	Bethel Music	
United States	August 7, 2020	Christian radio	Bethel Music	

== Maverick City Music and Upperroom version ==
"Champion"

Song by Maverick City Music and Upperroom featuring Brandon Lake and Maryanne J. George

from the EP You Hold It All Together
- Released: November 20, 2020
- Recorded: 2020
- Genre: Contemporary worship music
- Length: 7:29
- Label: Maverick City Music
- Songwriters: Brandon Lake; Dante Bowe; Jonathan Jay; Steffany Gretzinger; Tony Brown
- Producers: Jonathan Jay; Tony Brown; Oscar Gamboa

Music video
- "Champion" on YouTube

On November 20, 2020, Maverick City Music and Upperroom released their own rendition of "Champion" featuring Brandon Lake and Maryanne J. George, on their collaborative extended play, You Hold It All Together (2020).

=== Commercial performance ===
Maverick City Music and Upperroom's version of "Champion" debuted at number 48 on the US Hot Christian Songs chart. The song peaked at No. 42 and spent a total of three weeks on the Hot Christian Songs chart. On the Hot Gospel Songs chart, the song debuted at No. 20, and spent a total of five weeks on the chart.

=== Music video ===
Tribl released the official music video of "Champion" with Brandon Lake and Maryanne J. George leading the song at Upperroom in Dallas, Texas, through their YouTube channel on December 18, 2020.

=== Charts ===
Weekly chart performance for "Champion"
Chart (2020–2021)	Peak position
US Hot Christian Songs (Billboard)	42
US Gospel Songs (Billboard)	20
