= Come Out of That Grave (Resurrection Power) =

2020 song by Bethel Music and Brandon Lake

Promotional single by Bethel Music and Brandon Lake

from the album Revival's in the Air
- Released: May 25, 2020
- Recorded: 2019
- Venue: Bethel Church, Redding, California, U.S.
- Genre: Contemporary worship music
- Length: 4:58
- Label: Bethel Music
- Songwriters: Brian Johnson; Chris Davenport
- Producers: Brian Johnson; Joel Taylor

Music video
- "Come Out of That Grave (Resurrection Power)" (Live) on YouTube

"Come Out of That Grave (Resurrection Power)" is a song by Bethel Music and Brandon Lake, which was released as a promotional single from Bethel Music's twelfth live album, Revival's in the Air (2020), on May 25, 2020. The song was written by Brian Johnson and Chris Davenport. Brian Johnson and Joel Taylor handled the production of the song.

"Come Out of That Grave (Resurrection Power)" peaked at No. 38 on the US Hot Christian Songs chart.

== Background ==
On May 25, 2020, Bethel Music released "Come Out of That Grave (Resurrection Power)" as the first of four cascading promotional singles towards the release of Revival's in the Air on May 29, 2020, with the accompanying music video.

== Composition ==
"Come Out of That Grave (Resurrection Power)" is composed in the key of C with a tempo of 72 beats per minute and a musical time signature of 4/4.

== Commercial performance ==
"Come Out of That Grave (Resurrection Power)" made its debut at number 38 on Billboard's Hot Christian Songs chart dated June 13, 2020. It spent a total of two consecutive weeks on the Hot Christian Songs Chart.

== Music video ==
Bethel Music released the live music video of "Come Out of That Grave (Resurrection Power)" with Brandon Lake leading the song during the WorshipU 2019 conference held at Bethel Church through their YouTube channel on March 6, 2020.

== Charts ==
Weekly chart performance for "Come Out of That Grave (Resurrection Power)"
Chart (2020)	Peak position
US Hot Christian Songs (Billboard)	38
