= Revival's in the Air (song) =

2020 song by Bethel Music and Melissa Helser

Single by Bethel Music and Melissa Helser

from the album Revival's in the Air
- Released: September 4, 2020
- Recorded: 2020
- Genre: Contemporary worship music
- Length: 3:30
- Label: Bethel Music
- Songwriters: Jonathan David Helser; Melissa Helser; Cadence Helser
- Producers: David Leonard; Brad King; Seth Talley

Bethel Music singles chronology
"Champion" (2020)	"Revival's in the Air" (2020)	"Touch of Heaven / Alabaster Heart" (2021)

Melissa Helser singles chronology
"Raise a Hallelujah" (2019)	"Revival's in the Air" (2020)

Music video
- "Revival's in the Air" (Live) on YouTube

"Revival's in the Air" is a song by Bethel Music and Melissa Helser, which was released as the fifth single from Bethel Music's twelfth live album, Revival's in the Air (2020), on September 4, 2020. The song was written by Jonathan David Helser, Melissa Helser, Cadence Helser. David Leonard, Brad King, and Seth Talley handled the production of the single.

== Background ==
On May 28, 2020, Bethel Music released "Revival's in the Air" as the fourth and final promotional single from the Revival's in the Air, along with the song's accompanying live music video. Melissa Helser shared the story behind of the song, saying:

My prayer for this time in our country and world is that the truest form of revival would come. Not just meetings in buildings, but Emmanuel, “God with us” invading our lives and families and neighborhoods. That we would experience a greater measure of compassion for our brothers and sisters, and that Jesus would heal our land from fear, racism and hopelessness. That marriages would be restored and the broken would find wholeness in the stunning redemption and mercy of Jesus. May revival come in a way we didn’t even know was possible.

The studio-recorded version of "Revival's in the Air" was released in digital format on September 4, 2020. The song then impacted Christian radio in the United States on September 25, 2020.

== Composition ==
"Revival's in the Air" is composed in the key of A with a tempo of 190.5 beats per minute and a musical time signature of 12/8.

== Commercial performance ==
"Revival's in the Air" debuted at number 41 on the US Christian Airplay chart. The song went on to peak at number 30 and has spent a total of nine non-consecutive weeks on the chart.

== Music videos ==
Bethel Music released the live music video of "Revival's in the Air" with Melissa Helser leading the song at Bethel Church through their YouTube channel on May 28, 2020.

== Charts ==
Chart (2020)	Peak position
US Christian Airplay (Billboard)	24
US Christian AC (Billboard)	28

== Release history ==
Region	Date	Format	Label	Ref.
Various	May 28, 2020	Digital download (promotional release); streaming (promotional release)	Bethel Music	
Various	September 4, 2020	Digital download; streaming	Bethel Music	
United States	September 25, 2020	Christian radio	Bethel Music	
