= Rise Up (Lazarus) =

2020 single by Cain

Single by Cain

from the album Rise Up
- Released: April 17, 2020
- Recorded: 2020
- Genre: CCM; Christian country
- Length: 3:26
- Label: Provident Label Group
- Songwriters: Ethan Hulse; Logan Cain; Madison Cain; Nick Schwarz; Taylor Cain
- Producer: Nick Schwarz

Cain singles chronology
"Rise Up (Lazarus)" (2020)	"Never Lost" (2021)

Music videos
- "Rise Up (Lazarus)" on YouTube
- "Rise Up (Lazarus)" (Lyrics) on YouTube
- "Rise Up (Lazarus)" (Song Session) on YouTube

"Rise Up (Lazarus)" is the debut single by American Christian country band Cain. The song impacted Christian radio in the United States on April 17, 2020, as the lead single and title track from their debut studio album, Rise Up (2021). The song was written by Ethan Hulse, Logan Cain, Madison Cain, Nick Schwarz, and Taylor Cain. Nick Schwarz produced the single.

"Rise Up (Lazarus)" peaked at No. 4 on the US Hot Christian Songs chart.

== Background ==
"Rise Up (Lazarus)" was released by Cain as part of their self-titled extended play on March 6, 2020. On March 20, 2020, the radio team of Provident Label Group announced that "Rise Up (Lazarus)" will be serviced to Christian radio in the United States, and the official add date for the single slated on April 17, 2020. Logan Cain shared the story behind the song, saying:

It's this triumphant song about come on and rise up. My story is one of secret. As I felt myself feeling separated from God in cycles of destructive behavior & sin, the last thing I wanted to do was rise up. The last thing on earth that I wanted to do was to stand up and do what was right. When I feel defeated it's easy for me to recluse, to become comfortable in that place but I know that the voice of Jesus is always gonna call me to rise up. If you hold onto that truth, that voice will get loud and it will eventually get louder than the voice that's telling you to not rise up. There is no greater feeling of being alive than when you decide that I'm gonna take the power that's given to me by the blood that was shed on the cross and I'm going to stand on top of this thing that has held me down. When you rise up anything that felt like life before that pales in comparison.

== Composition ==
"Rise Up (Lazarus)" is composed in the key of C with a tempo of 87 beats per minute and a musical time signature of 4/4.

== Accolades ==
Year-end lists
Publication	Accolade	Rank	Ref.
Louder Than The Music	LTTM Single Awards 2021	6	

== Music videos ==
The official lyric video of "Rise Up (Lazarus)" was published on Cain's YouTube channel on March 6, 2020. The Song Session video of the song was availed by Essential Worship on August 16, 2020, to YouTube. The official music video for "Rise Up (Lazarus)" was availed by Cain on October 2, 2020, to YouTube. The official audio video of the cover featuring Zach Williams showcasing the single's artwork was published on YouTube on January 15, 2021.

== Track listing ==
"Rise Up (Lazarus)" with Zach Williams
No.	Title	Length
1.	"Rise Up (Lazarus)" (with Zach Williams)	3:25

"Rise Up (Lazarus)" Song Session with Essential Worship
No.	Title	Length
1.	"Rise Up (Lazarus)" (Song Session; with Essential Worship)	3:18

"Rise Up (Lazarus)" Song Session with Essential Worship — Apple Music bonus video content
No.	Title	Length
2.	"Rise Up (Lazarus)" (Song Session; with Essential Worship)	3:19

"Rise Up (Lazarus)" Franklin Remix
No.	Title	Length
1.	"Rise Up (Lazarus)" (Franklin Remix)	4:00

== Charts ==
=== Weekly charts ===
Weekly chart performance for "Rise Up (Lazarus)"
Chart (2020–2021)	Peak position
US Christian Songs (Billboard)	4
US Christian Airplay (Billboard)	1
US Christian AC (Billboard)	1

=== Year-end charts ===
Year-end chart performance for "Rise Up (Lazarus)"
Chart (2020)	Position
US Christian Songs (Billboard)	38
US Christian Airplay (Billboard)	33
US Christian AC (Billboard)	32
Chart (2021)	Position
US Christian Songs (Billboard)	28
US Christian Airplay (Billboard)	19
US Christian AC (Billboard)	19

== Release history ==
Release history and formats for "Rise Up (Lazarus)"
Region	Date	Version	Format	Label	Ref.
United States	April 17, 2020	Album	Christian radio	Provident Label Group	
Various	January 15, 2021	Cover (with Zach Williams)	Digital download; streaming	Provident Label Group	
Various	January 22, 2021	Song Session (with Essential Worship)	Digital download; streaming	Provident Label Group	
Various	March 12, 2021	Franklin Remix	Digital download; streaming	Provident Label Group	
