= You Make Me Brave: Live at the Civic =

Live album by Bethel Music
- Released: April 21, 2014
- Recorded: 2014
- Genre: Worship; CCM
- Length: 74:22
- Label: Bethel Music
- Producer: Gabriel Wilson; Daniel MacKenzie

Bethel Music chronology
Tides Live (2014)	You Make Me Brave: Live at the Civic (2014)	We Will Not Be Shaken (2015)

Singles from You Make Me Brave: Live at the Civic
- 1. "You Make Me Brave" Released: June 17, 2014; 2. "It Is Well" Released: March 31, 2015

You Make Me Brave: Live at the Civic marks the ninth album from Bethel Music, a worship group based out of Redding, California. The album was released through the group's imprint label, "Bethel Music", on April 21, 2014. The album was produced by Gabriel Wilson and Daniel MacKenzie, and executively produced by Brian Johnson and Joel Taylor.

== Background ==
You Make Me Brave was recorded live at Redding's Civic Auditorium during Bethel Church's women's conference in the summer of 2013.

== Critical reception ==
The album was reviewed by Josh White of The Church Collective saying that it is "classic Bethel", with three of the 12 tracks recorded during spontaneous moments of worship. White continues on to say that "the worship leaders from Bethel seriously outdo themselves with their musical influence, heavy synth, and wisely put-together arrangements of songs." When talking about the songs, he said "One of the songs that stuck out to me the most was Brian Johnson and Kari Jobe's "Forever." The arrangement feel and sounds like rendition of both Brian and Kari's version of the song. I was never a big fan of this song – until I heard this version. It takes every emotional influence the song has to offer, and takes it up a few notches. The title song, "You Make Me Brave," sounds and feels very, very personal. Jen said herself, "What was celebrated was what God was doing, not who was doing what. I really hope that people feel that the highlight is what the Lord is saying through the whole album versus who sang what, who did what, whose name is on what." He finally said, "All in all, this is what worship leaders want – solid, biblical, fresh songs that can speak to their people and have an amazing sound."

== Singles ==
A studio version of "You Make Me Brave" was released as the first single on June 17, 2014. Vocals were provided by Amanda Cook.

A radio version of "It Is Well" was released as the second single from the album on March 31, 2015. Vocals were provided by Kristene DiMarco.

== Accolades ==
This album was No. 8 on the Worship Leader's Top 20 Albums of 2014 list.

The song, "It Is Well", was No. 13 on the Worship Leader's Top 20 Songs of 2014 list.

== Track listing ==
Standard edition
No.	Title	Writer(s)	Worship leader(s)	Length
1.	"You Make Me Brave"	Amanda Cook	Amanda Cook	6:06
2.	"It Is Well"	Kristene DiMarco	Kristene DiMarco	6:25
3.	"A Little Longer"	Jenn Johnson	Jenn Johnson	7:41
4.	"Forever"	J. Johnson; Kari Jobe; Brian Johnson; Gabriel Wilson; Joel Taylor; Christa Black Gifford	Kari Jobe	11:24
5.	"Joy of the Lord" (Spontaneous)	J. Johnson	Jenn Johnson	6:40
6.	"Anchor"	Jobe; B. Johnson; Cody Carnes	Leah Valenzuela	4:45
7.	"Shepherd"	Cook	Amanda Cook	6:10
8.	"Wonder" (Spontaneous)	Cook	Amanda Cook	6:31
9.	"We Dance"	Cook; Steffany Frizzell Gretzinger	Steffany Frizzell Gretzinger	4:41
10.	"I Belong to You"	Cook	Amanda Cook	4:48
11.	"Come to Me"	J. Johnson	Jenn Johnson	7:42
12.	"We Step into Freedom" (Spontaneous)	J. Johnson	Jenn Johnson	1:29

== Credits ==
Adapted from AllMusic.

- Heather Armstrong — photography
- Clint Aull — technician
- Amanda Cook — vocals, worship leader
- Kristene DiMarco — vocals, worship leader
- Steffany Frizzell-Gretzinger — vocals, worship leader
- Chris Greely — engineer, mixing engineer
- Myriah Grubbs — background vocals
- Nathan Grubbs — stage design
- Tyler Hanns — cover design
- Kalley Heiligenthal — background vocals
- Luke Hendrickson — engineer
- Kiley Hill — project manager
- Kari Jobe — vocals, worship leader
- Brian Johnson — acoustic guitar, executive producer
- Jenn Johnson — vocals, worship leader
- Judah Kirkwood — assistant technician, guitar technician
- Aaron Knott — assistant engineer
- Jeremy Larson — strings arrangement, strings
- Daniel Mackenzie — bass, engineer, producer
- Casey Marvin — backline technician, guitar technician
- Graham Moore — percussion
- Michael Pope — electric guitar
- Kallan Sadler — keyboard
- David Whitworth — drums
- Michael Spear — back cover photo, cover photo
- Bobby Strand — electric guitar, pre-production
- Joel Taylor — executive producer
- Paul Vaffa-Coffman — monitor technician
- Leah Valenzuela — vocals, worship leader
- Hank Williams — mastering
- Gabriel Wilson — engineer, producer

== Charts ==
=== Album ===
==== Weekly charts ====
Chart (2014)	Peak position
Australian Albums (ARIA)	34
Canadian Albums (Billboard)	23
UK Christian & Gospel Albums (OCC)	1
US Billboard 200	10
US Christian Albums (Billboard)	1
US Digital Albums (Billboard)	6
US Independent Albums (Billboard)	1

==== Year-end charts ====
Chart (2014)	Position
US Christian Albums (Billboard)	30

Chart (2015)	Position
US Christian Albums (Billboard)	26

Chart (2017)	Position
US Christian Albums (Billboard)	41

Chart (2018)	Position
US Christian Albums (Billboard)	36

=== Singles ===
Year	Single	Peak positions		
Year	Single	US Christian	Christian Airplay	Christian Digital Songs
2014	"You Make Me Brave"	16	20	13
2015	"It is Well"	27	31	21

== Certifications and sales ==
Region	Certification	Certified units/sales
South Africa (RISA)	Gold	20,000^{*}
^{*} Sales figures based on certification alone.
