= Take Courage =

Single by Bethel Music and Kristene DiMarco

from the album Starlight and Where His Light Was
- Released: May 8, 2017
- Genre: Worship
- Length: 6:18 (Live); 3:59 (Radio version)
- Label: Bethel
- Songwriters: Kristene DiMarco; Jeremy Riddle; Joel Taylor
- Producers: Ran Jackson; Chris Greely

Bethel Music singles chronology
"Have It All" (2016)	"Take Courage" (2017)	"Living Hope" (2018)

Kristene DiMarco singles chronology
"Eyes on You" (2015)	"Take Courage" (2017)

"Take Courage" is a song by California-based worship group Bethel Music and Kristene DiMarco. It was released on May 8, 2017, as the lead single from Bethel's ninth live album, Starlight (2017), and Kristene DiMarco's third studio album, Where His Light Was (2017). The song also appeared on the album Bethel Music en Español (2019). The song was written by DiMarco, Jeremy Riddle, and Joel Taylor, with production being handled by Ran Jackson and Chris Greely.

== Background ==
In an interview with Kevin Davis of New Release Today, DiMarco said:

"I consider this song to be ten years in the making, a finishing a season in my life kind of song. For me, we recently purchased a house last year, and I had the lyrics 'watch your triumph unfold' in a frame that a friend made me. When we finally got to move into the house, I put it on the mantel and started weeping. I realized it had been ten years in the making. I had been in a tough time in San Francisco in a prayer movement, and it was one of those places in life where you couldn't see where you were going and just putting one foot in front time after time. That's what this song is about, this mystery of what surrounds you, not being able to see what's coming. You can't go back, and you just have to trust. It's about God not abandoning us in those places of waiting. He's with us on our whole journey. When we get to the end of our process, we can look back and see that He's with us every step of the way, and He lit up our road behind us."

On the composition of the song, she stated:

"When I sat down to put all of this process to words, I sat with Jeremy Riddle, and he's a great sounding board for me. He's a lot more straightforward than I am when it comes to writing. I tend to be off in the clouds, and it makes sense to me, but it may not make sense to anyone else. I had the first part of the chorus, and he wanted to add 'hold on to your hope', because in the waiting that's the one thing you can't lose is hope, even when you can't see. I really wanted to sing 'watch your triumph unfold' after reading about Jehoshaphat in 2nd Chronicles. God told him he didn't need to fight in this battle, and I wanted to work that into the song."

== Critical reception ==
New Release Today's Kevin Davis claimed "This song is all about having a strong faith. Without faith it is impossible to please God. Sometimes we have a tendency to think we can try to know everything. God tells us in the Bible that with faith, we can do anything in Christ. I'm completely convicted by the strong lyrics and find immense comfort in this song filled with biblical truth. Like her previous songs, 'It is Well' and 'I Will Follow You', Kristene has once again written a song that touches my heart and meets me where I am spiritually." Laura Chambers of Today's Christian Entertainment said "'Take Courage' encourages us to wait for God to reveal His way in due time, never losing faith that He will come through for us. Kristene DiMarco reminds herself of God's promise to complete what He started. We can find Him while we faithfully await the victory He'll bring. The strength of her voice complements the power she knows God wields, before softening as though one were falling asleep assured of their safety."

== Charts ==
Chart (2017)	Peak position
US Hot Christian Songs (Billboard)	36

== Release history ==
Region	Date	Format	Label	Ref.
Worldwide	May 8, 2017	Digital download	Bethel Music	
United States	June 16, 2017	Christian radio	Bethel Music	
