= The Commission (song) =

2021 single by Cain

Single by Cain

from the album Rise Up
- Released: December 11, 2021
- Genre: CCM; Christian country
- Length: 3:15
- Label: Provident Label Group
- Songwriters: Blake Neesmith; Carter Frodge; Logan Cain; Madison Cain; Taylor Cain

Cain singles chronology
"Wonderful" (2021)	"The Commission" (2021)	"Desert Road" (2022)

Version featuring Cody Carnes
- Version featuring Cody Carnes

Cody Carnes singles chronology
"Firm Foundation (He Won't)" (2021)	"The Commission" (2022)	"Be Glad" (2022)

Music videos
- "The Commission" on YouTube
- "The Commission" (Acoustic) on YouTube
- "The Commission" (Lyrics) on YouTube
- "The Commission" (featuring Cody Carnes; Lyrics) on YouTube
- "The Commission" (Song Session) on YouTube

"The Commission" is a song performed by American Christian country band Cain. The song was released on December 11, 2021, as the third single from their debut studio album, Rise Up (2021). The song was written by Blake Neesmith, Carter Frodge, Logan Cain, Madison Cain, Nick Schwarz, and Taylor Cain.

"The Commission" peaked at number two on the US Hot Christian Songs chart.

== Background ==
On November 29, 2021, the radio team of Provident Label Group announced that "The Commission" will be serviced to Christian radio in the United States, the official add date for the single slated on December 31, 2021.

The song is about the Great Commission, drawing inspiration from Matthew 28:19–20. Taylor Cain Matz shared the story behind the song, saying:

There is a God in heaven and He sent His only son to die for you, just for you. We get to spend all eternity with Him. This short life on earth, it isn't everything. Our whole purpose is to see Jesus as our King but also as our Friend and Someone who said I'm entrusting all the Gospel, all the good news to you. And I'm counting on you to pass it along to somebody that you care about.

On April 15, 2022, Cain released a new version of "The Commission" featuring Cody Carnes, accompanied with its lyric video.

== Composition ==
"The Commission" is composed in the key of F with a tempo of 75 beats per minute and a musical time signature of 4/4.

== Accolades ==
Year-end lists
Publication	Accolade	Ref.
NewReleaseToday	Best of 2022: Top 10 Songs of the Year	

== Commercial performance ==
"The Commission" made its debut at number 30 on the US Christian Airplay chart dated December 18, 2021, being the highest ranking debut that week.

"The Commission" debuted at number 50 on the US Hot Christian Songs chart dated January 8, 2022.

== Music videos ==
The official audio video of "The Commission" was published on Cain's YouTube channel on March 6, 2020. The Song Session video of the song was availed by Essential Worship on March 16, 2020, to YouTube. The official acoustic performance video of the song was published by Cain on YouTube on May 21, 2021. The official lyric video of the song was published by Cain on YouTube on June 11, 2021.

The official music video for "The Commission" premiered on Cain's YouTube channel on December 10, 2021. The music video was filmed on the set of the television drama The Chosen in Utah, the song being featured on a Christmas special episode titled "Christmas With The Chosen: The Messengers".

Cain published the official lyric video for the version of "The Commission" featuring Cody Carnes on April 15, 2022.

== Track listing ==
The Commission
No.	Title	Writer(s)	Length
1.	"The Commission" (Band Version)	Blake Neesmith; Carter Frodge; Logan Cain; Madison Cain; Taylor Cain	3:15

The Commission — Apple Music exclusive
No.	Title	Length
1.	"The Commission" (Band Version)	3:15
2.	"The Commission" (Music Video)	3:15
Total length:		6:30

The Commission (featuring Cody Carnes)
No.	Title	Length
1.	"The Commission" (featuring Cody Carnes)	3:15

== Charts ==
=== Weekly charts ===
Weekly chart performance for "The Commission"
Chart (2021–2022)	Peak position
US Christian Songs (Billboard)	2
US Christian Airplay (Billboard)	4
US Christian AC (Billboard)	4

=== Year-end charts ===
Year-end chart performance for "The Commission"
Chart (2022)	Position
US Christian Songs (Billboard)	20
US Christian Airplay (Billboard)	19
US Christian AC (Billboard)	17

== Release history ==
Release dates and formats for "The Commission"
Region	Date	Version	Format	Label	Ref.
Various	December 11, 2021	Band	Digital download; streaming	Provident Label Group	
United States	December 31, 2021	Band	Christian radio	Provident Label Group	
Various	April 15, 2022	featuring Cody Carnes	Digital download; streaming	Provident Label Group	
