= God of Revival =

Single by Bethel Music, Brian Johnson and Jenn Johnson

from the album Revival's in the Air
- Released: February 7, 2020
- Recorded: 2019
- Venue: Bethel Church, Redding, California, U.S.
- Genre: Contemporary worship music
- Length: 8:34
- Label: Bethel Music
- Songwriters: Brian Johnson; Phil Wickham
- Producers: Brian Johnson; Joel Taylor

Bethel Music singles chronology
"Goodness of God" (2019)	"God of Revival" (2020)	"We Praise You" (2020)

Brian Johnson singles chronology
"Have It All" (2016)	"God of Revival" (2020)

Jenn Johnson singles chronology
"Famous For (I Believe)" (2020)	"God of Revival" (2020)	"Joy Invincible" (2020)

Studio version
- Studio version

Music videos
- "God of Revival" (Live) on YouTube
- "God of Revival" (featuring Phil Wickham; Live) on YouTube

"God of Revival" is a song by Bethel Music, Brian Johnson and Jenn Johnson, which was released as the lead single from Bethel Music's twelfth live album, Revival's in the Air (2020), on February 7, 2020. The song was written by Brian Johnson and Phil Wickham. Brian Johnson also collaborated on the production of the single with Joel Taylor.

"God of Revival" peaked at number 22 on the US Hot Christian Songs chart.

== Background ==
On February 3, 2020, Bethel Music announced that "God of Revival" will be released on February 7, 2020, as the lead single to their album of the same name, revealing the cover artwork, and availing the song for pre-save on Spotify. The live version of the song was recorded at Bethel Church, featuring Brian and Jenn Johnson as worship leaders, was released on February 7, with Bethel also announcing that the album will be released later in the year.

Bethel Music released a song story video, in which Brian Johnson was on a video-call with Phil Wickham, a co-writer on "God of Revival". They spoke about the heart and message behind the song, as well as the impact of the live recording on Wickham when he had heard for the first time, with Wickham sharing that he had received the recording while on a run and stopped on a sidewalk as the bridge began with "Come awaken," and started to cry.

On December 22, 2020, Bethel Music had announced via Daily Play MPE that "God of Revival" would be slated to impact Christian radio on February 5, 2021.

== Composition ==
"God of Revival" is composed in the key of D♭ with a moderate rock tempo of 72 beats per minute and a musical time signature of 4/4.

== Commercial performance ==
"God of Revival" debuted at number 31 on the US Hot Christian Songs chart dated February 22, 2021, concurrently charting at No. 5 on the Christian Digital Song Sales chart. It went on to peak at number 22 on the chart, and spent a total of twenty-four non-consecutive weeks on Hot Christian Songs Chart.

== Music videos ==
Bethel Music released the live music video of "God of Revival" with Brian and Jenn Johnson leading the song during the WorshipU 2019 conference held at Bethel Church through their YouTube channel on February 7, 2020. Bethel Music then released another live music video recorded at Heaven Come conference featuring Brian and Jenn Johnson leading the song in worship alongside Phil Wickham.

== Track listing ==
"God of Revival" (Live)
No.	Title	Writer(s)	Length
1.	"God of Revival" (Live)	Brian Johnson; Phil Wickham	8:34

"God of Revival" (Studio Version)
No.	Title	Length
1.	"God of Revival" (Studio Version)	4:01

== Charts ==
Chart (2020–21)	Peak position
US Hot Christian Songs (Billboard)	22
US Christian Airplay (Billboard)	17
US Christian AC (Billboard)	26

== Release history ==
Region	Date	Version	Format	Label	Ref.
Various	February 7, 2020	Live	Digital download; streaming	Bethel Music	
Various	January 1, 2021	Studio	Digital download; streaming	Bethel Music	
United States	February 5, 2021	Studio	Christian radio	Bethel Music	

== Other versions ==
- Phil Wickham released his own version of the song on his eighth studio album, Hymn of Heaven (2021).
