= It Is Well (Bethel Music and Kristene DiMarco song) =

2014 song by Bethel Music and Kristene DiMarco

Single by Bethel Music and Kristene DiMarco

from the album You Make Me Brave: Live at the Civic
- Released: March 27, 2015
- Recorded: 2014
- Genre: Contemporary worship music
- Length: 4:02
- Label: Bethel Music
- Songwriters: Horatio Spafford; Kristene DiMarco; Philip Bliss
- Producers: Gabriel Wilson; Daniel Mackenzie

Bethel Music singles chronology
"You Make Me Brave" (2014)	"It Is Well" (2015)	"No Longer Slaves" (2015)

Kristene DiMarco singles chronology
"It Is Well" (2015)	"I Will Follow You" (2015)

Music videos
- "It Is Well" (Live) on YouTube
- "It Is Well" (Lyrics) on YouTube

"It Is Well" is a song performed by Bethel Music and Kristene DiMarco. It was released to Christian radio in the United States as the second single from Bethel Music's ninth album, You Make Me Brave (2014), on March 27, 2015. Kristene DiMarco wrote the song, with Horatio Spafford and Philip Bliss receiving posthumous credits for the interpolation of the hymn "It Is Well with My Soul". Gabriel Wilson and Daniel Mackenzie handled the production of the single.

"It Is Well" peaked at number 27 on the Hot Christian Songs chart in the United States. The song has been certified platinum by the Recording Industry Association of America (RIAA).

== Background ==
On February 25, 2015, Bethel Music announced that "It Is Well" would be released to Christian radio stations in the United States on March 27, 2015. The song was released in digital format on March 31, 2015.

Kristene DiMarco shared the story behind the song in an interview with Kevin Davis of NewReleaseToday, saying:

"I was in our backyard crying out to God, and He so clearly brought the phrase into my mind "the waves and wind still know My name, Kristene." I could almost hear God laughing, and I knew bigger fish have been fried. I remember thinking that it was so true, and God has already come through so much and in so many ways for me. He brought me an amazing husband, and He brought me to this great city of Redding, California. He's given me so much, and yet I was so worried."

== Composition ==
"It Is Well" is composed in the key of G with a tempo of 65 beats per minute and a musical time signature of 4/4.

== Commercial performance ==
"It Is Well" debuted at number 46 on the US Hot Christian Songs chart dated May 10, 2014. The song went on to peak at number 27 and spent a total of twenty-two non-consecutive weeks on the chart.

== Music videos ==
Bethel Music released the live music video of "It Is Well" through their YouTube channel on April 28, 2014, with Kristene DiMarco leading the song. On April 18, 2015, the lyric video of the song was published by Bethel Music on their YouTube channel.

== Charts ==
Chart (2014–15)	Peak position
US Hot Christian Songs (Billboard)	27

== Certifications ==
Region	Certification	Certified units/sales
United States (RIAA)	Platinum	1,000,000^{‡}
^{‡} Sales+streaming figures based on certification alone.

== Release history ==
Region	Date	Format	Label	Ref.
United States	March 27, 2015	Christian radio	Bethel Music	
Various	March 31, 2015	Digital download; streaming	Bethel Music	

== Other versions ==
- Passion released their version of "It Is Well" featuring Kristian Stanfill on their live album, Even So Come (2015).
- Kristene DiMarco released her own rendition of "It Is Well" on her live album, Mighty (2015).
- Bethel Music released an instrumental remix of the song on their instrumental album, Without Words: Synesthesia (2015).
