= Paul and Hannah McClure =

American contemporary worship duo

- Origin: Redding, California, US
- Genres: Contemporary worship music
- Years active: 2011–present
- Labels: Bethel Music
- Members: Hannah McClure; Paul McClure
- Website: paulandhannahmcclure.com

Paul and Hannah McClure (previously known as The McClures) are an American contemporary worship duo composed of musicians Paul McClure and Hannah McClure. The duo released their debut studio album, The Way Home, on August 30, 2019, through Bethel Music. The album spawned the singles "Now I See", "Only Have One", and "Reign Above It All". The Way Home debuted at No. 36 on Billboard's Top Christian Albums Chart in the United States.

== History ==
=== Background ===
Paul and Hannah McClure first began leading worship at their local church as teenagers in their hometown of High Point, North Carolina. In 2009, they attended the WorshipU conference hosted by Bethel Music in Redding, California. This influenced the duo's cross-country relocation to Redding, where they began serving as worship leaders and songwriters at Bethel Church in 2011.

=== 2019-present: The Way Home, Christmas Morning ===
The McClures made their career debut on Bethel Music with the release of "Now I See" on July 12, 2019, as the lead single to their debut studio album, The Way Home. On August 16, 2019, the duo released "Only Have One" as the second single from the album, The Way Home. "Only Have One" debuted at number 49 on the US Hot Christian Songs chart. The duo released their debut studio album, The Way Home, on August 30, 2019. The album debuted at number 36 on the Top Christian Albums Chart in the United States.

On October 23, 2020, The McClures released "Christmas Morning" as the lead single to their holiday-themed extended play, Christmas Morning. The EP was released on November 13, 2020. On February 12, 2021, the duo released "Reign Above It All" as their third single from the album The Way Home (2019).

== Discography ==
=== Albums ===
List of albums, with selected chart positions
Title	Album details	Peak chart positions		
Title	Album details	US Christ.	US Indie	US Heat.
The Way Home	Debut album; Released: August 30, 2019; Label: Bethel Music; Format: CD, digital download, streaming	36	31	11
"—" denotes a recording that did not chart.

=== EPs ===
List of extended plays
Title	Album details
Christmas Morning	Released: November 13, 2020; Label: Bethel Music; Format: Digital download, streaming

=== Singles ===
List of singles and peak chart positions
Title	Year	Peak positions			Album
Title	Year	US Christ	US Christ. Airplay	US Christ. AC	Album
"Now I See"	2019	—	—	—	The Way Home
"Only Have One"	2019	49	—	—	The Way Home
"Way Maker"	2019	—	—	—	Non-album single
"Christmas Morning"	2020	—	41	30	Christmas Morning (EP)
"Reign Above It All"	2021	—	40	—	The Way Home
"I Belong to Jesus"	2022	—	—	—	TBD
"—" denotes a recording that did not chart.

== See also ==
- List of Christian worship music artists
