= Egypt (Bethel Music and Cory Asbury song) =

Single by Bethel Music and Cory Asbury

from the album Revival's in the Air
- Released: April 3, 2020
- Recorded: 2019
- Venue: Bethel Church, Redding, California, U.S.
- Genre: Contemporary worship music
- Length: 6:22 (live); 3:20 (studio version)
- Label: Bethel Music
- Songwriters: Phil Wickham; Brian Johnson; Cory Asbury; Ethan Hulse; Lee Cummings
- Producers: Brian Johnson; Joel Taylor

Bethel Music singles chronology
"We Praise You" (2020)	"Egypt" (2020)	"Champion" (2020)

Cory Asbury singles chronology
"Christ Be Magnified" (2020)	"Egypt" (2020)	"Together (Acoustic Version)" (2020)

Studio version
- Studio version

Music video
- "Egypt" (Live) on YouTube

"Egypt" is a song by Bethel Music and Cory Asbury, which was released as the third single from Bethel Music's twelfth live album, Revival's in the Air (2020), on April 3, 2020. The song was written by Phil Wickham, Brian Johnson, Cory Asbury, Ethan Hulse, and Lee Cummings. It celebrates God's faithfulness with reference to the story of the Israelites' deliverance from Egypt to their Promised Land. Brian Johnson also collaborated on the production of the single with Joel Taylor.

== Background ==
On April 3, 2020, Bethel Music released that "Egypt" as the third single to their album, Revival's in the Air (2020), which was initially marketed as God of Revival at the time that the single was released. It was preceded by Bethel's releases of "God of Revival" and "We Praise You" as singles, as well as Asbury's remix of "Reckless Love" featuring Tori Kelly, "The Father's House" and "Christ Be Magnified".

Cory Asbury shared the story behind the song, which first came to view in 2017 following his family's move from Colorado Springs to Kalamazoo, Michigan, saying:

My wife and I were leading worship at our local church, and during the final song of the set the church just erupted into spontaneous praise. Our pastor jumped on stage and began leading the room in thanksgiving. During this time, he spoke the phrase, 'You stepped into my Egypt,' and something inside of me leapt. It was the phrase my heart had been feeling but lacked language for until that moment.

— Cory Asbury

On June 18, 2021, Cory Asbury released the studio version of "Egypt" on digital platforms. Asbury's studio version of "Egypt" impacted Christian radio stations in the United States on July 30, 2021.

== Composition ==
"Egypt" is composed in the key of A♭ with a moderate rock tempo of 75 beats per minute and a musical time signature of 4/4.

== Commercial performance ==
The live version of "Egypt" debuted at No. 37 on the US Hot Christian Songs chart dated April 18, 2021, concurrently charting at No. 8 on the Christian Digital Song Sales chart. It went on to peak at No. 34 on the chart, and spent a total of seven non-consecutive weeks on Hot Christian Songs Chart.

The studio version of "Egypt" debuted at No. 48 on the US Christian Airplay chart dated August 21, 2021. The song then entered the Hot Christian Songs chart dated October 23, 2021, at No. 50.

== Music videos ==
Bethel Music released the live music video of "Egypt" with Cory Asbury leading the song at Bethel Church through their YouTube channel on April 3, 2020.

== Track listing ==
"Egypt" (Live)
No.	Title	Writer(s)	Length
1.	"Egypt" (Live)	Phil Wickham; Brian Johnson; Cory Asbury; Ethan Hulse; Lee Cummings	6:22

"Egypt" (Studio Version)
No.	Title	Length
1.	"Egypt" (Studio Version)	3:20

== Charts ==
=== Weekly charts ===
Weekly chart performance for "Egypt (Live)"
Chart (2020)	Peak position
US Hot Christian Songs (Billboard)	34

Weekly chart performance for "Egypt (Studio Version)"
Chart (2021–2022)	Peak position
US Christian Songs (Billboard)	16
US Christian Airplay (Billboard)	12
US Christian AC (Billboard)	12

=== Year-end charts ===
Year-end chart performance for "Egypt (Studio Version)"
Chart (2022)	Position
US Christian Songs (Billboard)	47
US Christian AC (Billboard)	37

== Release history ==
Region	Date	Version	Format	Label	Ref.
Various	April 3, 2020	Live	Digital download; streaming	Bethel Music	
Various	June 18, 2021	Studio	Digital download; streaming	Bethel Music	
United States	July 30, 2021	Studio	Christian radio	Bethel Music	

== Other versions ==
- Cain and Essential Worship released a cover of the song as a standalone single.
