= Kristene DiMarco =

American contemporary Christian musician

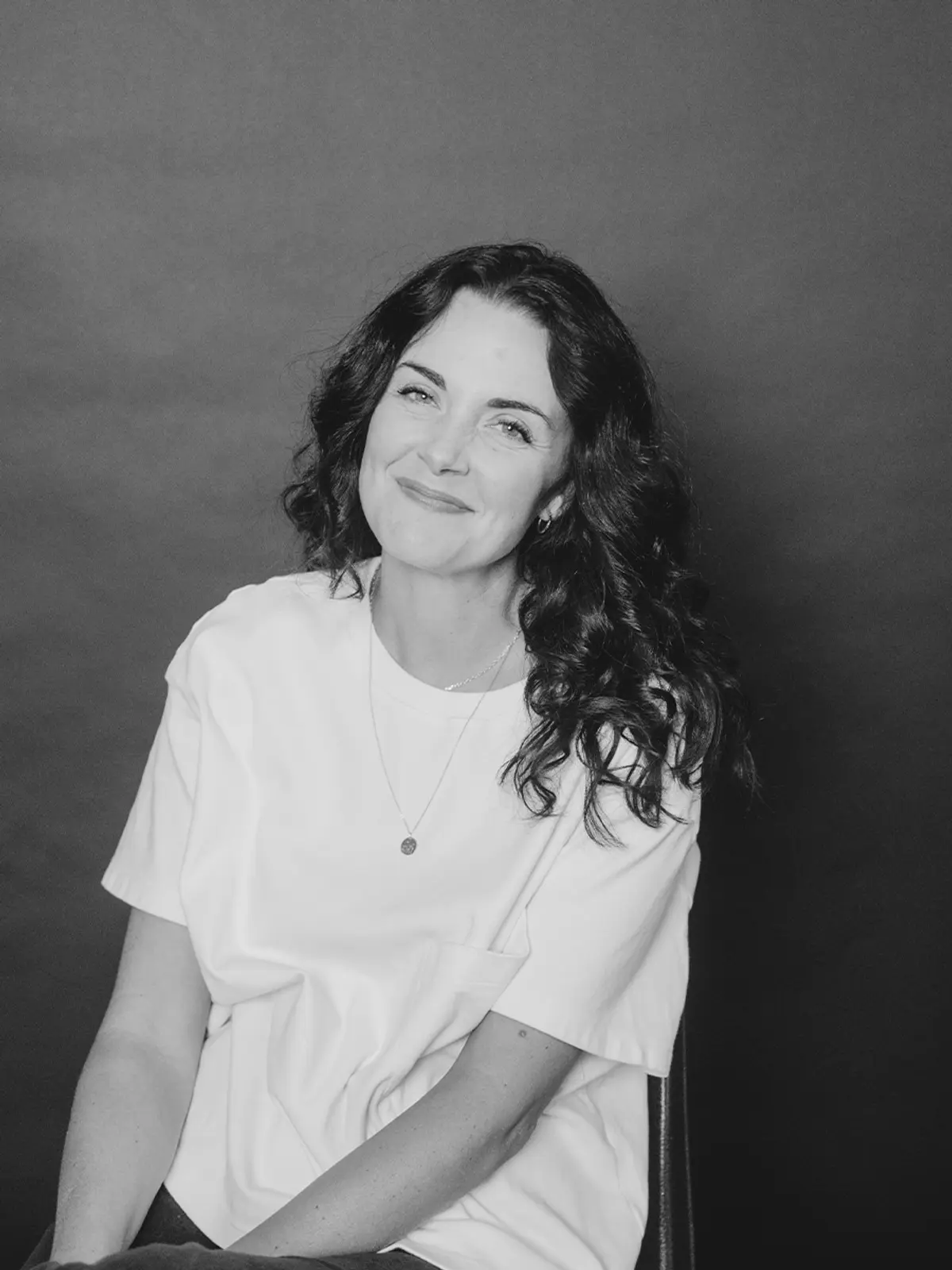

Background information
- Also known as: Kristene Mueller-DiMarco
- Born: Kristene Elizabeth Mueller; January 28, 1985 (age 41); Niagara Falls, New York
- Origin: Redding, California
- Genres: Contemporary Christian music, contemporary worship music, folk
- Occupations: Singer, songwriter
- Instrument: Vocals
- Years active: 2008–present
- Labels: Bethel Music, Jesus Culture, Kingsway, Sparrow
- Website: kristenedimarco.com

Kristene DiMarco (born January 28, 1985, as Kristene Elizabeth Mueller), is an American contemporary Christian musician. Her first album, Those Who Dream, was released by Jesus Culture Music in 2008, along with a re-release of the same album in 2010 by Kingsway Music. She released, Safe Place, in 2012 with Kingsway Music. Her next album Mighty was released July 31, 2015 by Jesus Culture Music alongside Sparrow Records.

== Early life ==
DiMarco was born on January 28, 1985, in Niagara Falls, New York, as Kristene Elizabeth Mueller to Douglas Edward Mueller and Dianne B. Mueller (née Mielke), and she has three sisters. Her parents are born-again Christians.

== Music career ==
Kristene grew up in Niagara Falls, New York and attended Destiny Christian Church with her family. In 2002, when Kristene was 16 years old, a new worship leader came on staff at the church. After being asked to join the worship team she began learning to play the piano. A year later, her worship leader asked her to lead a song for the first time. From that point on, she began writing worship music and leading songs on Sunday mornings with guidance from her worship leader. Upon graduating High School, Kristene moved to Kansas City and attended the International House of Prayer as an intern. From there, Kristene moved to San Francisco.

Her music recording career commenced in 2008, with the album, Those Who Dream, and it was released on December 9, 2008 by Jesus Culture Music, with a re-release from Kingsway Music of the same album on July 13, 2010. The album was reviewed by Cross Rhythms. She released, Safe Place, on April 10, 2012 by Kingsway Music. The album was reviewed by Cross Rhythms, Indie Vision Music, Jesus Freak Hideout twice, Louder Than the Music, and New Release Tuesday.

She has appeared on Bethel Music's album, You Make Me Brave, performing the single, "It Is Well", and this charted on the Billboard magazine song chart, Hot Christian Songs, reaching a peak of No. 27. In the spring of 2016, Bethel Music announced that DiMarco would be joining their Collective.

== Personal life ==
Kristene is married to Jordan DiMarco, and they have two children, daughter Lorelai Praise and son Nicodemus León. They reside in San Diego, California.

== Discography ==
=== Studio albums ===
List of albums, with selected chart positions
Title	Album details	Peak chart positions		
Title	Album details	US Christ.	US Ind.	UK C&G
Those Who Dream	Debut album; Released: December 9, 2008; Re-released: July 13, 2010; Label: Jesus Culture/Kingsway; Format: CD, digital download, streaming	—	—	—
Safe Place	Released: April 10, 2012; Label: Kingsway; Format: CD, digital download, streaming	—	—	—
Where His Light Was	Released: September 22, 2017; Label: Bethel Music; Format: CD, digital download, streaming	3	19	1
The Field	Released: April 8, 2022; Label: Bethel Music; Format: CD, digital download, streaming	—	—	—
"—" denotes a recording that did not chart or was not released in that territory.

=== Live albums ===
List of albums, with selected chart positions
Title	Album details	Peak chart positions	
Title	Album details	US	US Christ.
Mighty	First live album; Released: July 31, 2015; Label: Jesus Culture / Sparrow; Format: CD, digital download, streaming	169	7

=== Singles ===
List of singles and peak chart positions
Title	Year	Peak positions				Certifications	Album
Title	Year	US Christ.	Christ. Airplay	Christ. Digital	Christ. Stream	Certifications	Album
"It Is Well" (with Bethel Music)	2015	27	31	21	19	RIAA: Platinum	You Make Me Brave: Live at the Civic
"I Will Follow You"	2015	—	—	—	—		Mighty
"Jesus, Your Love"	2015	—	—	—	—		Mighty
"Eyes on You"	2015	—	—	—	—		Mighty
"Take Courage" (with Bethel Music)	2017	36	34	20	—		Starlight / Where His Light Was
"You Are My Country" (with Gable Price and Friends)	2020	—	—	—	—		Non-album single
"I Want to Serve God" (with Sam McCabe)	2021	—	—	—	—		Non-album single
"—" denotes a recording that did not chart or was not released in that territory.

=== Other charted songs ===
Song	Year	Peak positions	Album
Song	Year	Christ. Stream	Album
"Break Every Chain" (Jesus Culture featuring Kristene DiMarco)	2015	24	Awakening: Live from Chicago

== Awards and nominations ==
=== GMA Dove Awards ===
Year	Nominee / work	Award	Result	Ref.
2022	"I Need You" (Note: DiMarco was credited as a co-writer on "I Need You" by Gable Price and Friends.) (Gable Price and Friends)	Rock/Contemporary Recorded Song of the Year	Nominated	
