= Evidence (Josh Baldwin album) =

Studio album by Josh Baldwin
- Released: October 2, 2020
- Recorded: 2020
- Genre: Worship; CCM; country
- Length: 47:26
- Label: Bethel Music
- Producer: Ed Cash; David Leonard; Brad King; Seth Talley

Josh Baldwin studio album chronology
The War Is Over (2017)	Evidence (2020)

Josh Baldwin chronology
Live at Church (2020)	Evidence (2020)

Singles from Evidence
- 1. "Evidence" Released: March 13, 2020; 2. "Into the Wild" Released: May 8, 2021

Evidence is the fourth studio album by American Christian musician Josh Baldwin. The album was released on October 2, 2020, by Bethel Music. The album was produced by Ed Cash, David Leonard, Brad King and Seth Talley.

The album was supported by the release of the title track, "Evidence," and "Into the Wild" as singles. "Evidence" peaked at No. 7 on the US Hot Christian Songs chart. The album debuted at No. 41 on the Top Christian Albums Chart in the United States.

== Background ==
In an interview with American Songwriter, Baldwin explained that the creative process of producing the album began with the release of the single "Stand in Your Love" in 2018, shifting his perspective on the implicit pressure to produce of making music that did not represent his North Carolinian roots. Baldwin explained the process, saying:

It sounded like North Carolina, and I didn’t try to change any of that when we were producing and recording it. It opened my eyes to ‘oh, I should just be myself and let the music come out the way it naturally wants to, and not try to make it fit some kind of mold that I think is gonna work, or that I think is gonna draw people in to listen to it more.

== Release and promotion ==
=== Singles ===
On June 1, 2020, Bethel Music had announced via Daily Play MPE that "Evidence" would be Josh Baldwin's next single, with the song slated to impact Christian radio on July 3, 2020. On June 12, 2020, Baldwin released a new single titled "Evidence" as the lead single from the album. "Evidence" peaked at No. 7 on the US Hot Christian Songs chart. Baldwin released the radio-adapted version of "Into the Wild" on May 7, 2021, as the second single from the album.

=== Promotional singles ===
On September 16, 2020, Bethel Music announced that Evidence would be released on October 2, 2020, and the release of "Into the Wild" was as the next single would slated on September 18, 2020. "Into the Wild" was subsequently released as the album's first promotional single. On September 25, 2020, Baldwin released "New Creations" as the second promotional single from the album.

== Critical reception ==
Professional ratings
Review scores
Source	Rating
365 Days of Inspiring Media	4.5/5
Jesus Freak Hideout	4/5 stars
JubileeCast	3.75/5

In a positive review from 365 Days of Inspiring Media, Joshua Andre lauded Baldwin, describing the album as "a thoroughly enjoyable project that just may become better and better with each listen." Jesus Freak Hideout's Alex Caldwell stated in his review of the album: "Evidence may not be as wild as its title may suggest, but it's a great step forward for this up-and-coming songwriter and a good bit of evidence that worship music can be as varied and interesting as the geography that the writer comes from. Worship is both a deeply personal and corporate exercise all at the same time, and Evidence is a good case for both sides." Timothy Yap of JubileeCast stated in his review of the album: "Like many singer-songwriters, it's quite a challenge to record an album's worth of A class material, so there are bound to be fillers. Nevertheless, there are still some outstanding entries worth checking out."

== Commercial performance ==
In the United States, Evidence debuted at number 41 on the Billboard Top Christian Albums chart dated October 17, 2020.

== Track listing ==
Evidence — Standard edition
No.	Title	Writer(s)	Producer(s)	Length
1.	"Into the Wild"	Josh Baldwin; Bobby Strand; Steffany Gretzinger; Ethan Hulse	David Leonard; Brad King; Seth Talley	3:55
2.	"Evidence"	Ed Cash; Baldwin; Hulse	Ed Cash	3:50
3.	"New Creations"	Baldwin; Hulse; Ben Backus; Mark Campbell	David Leonard; Brad King; Seth Talley	3:50
4.	"Beloved"	Baldwin; Hulse	David Leonard; Brad King; Seth Talley	3:47
5.	"Your Voice"	Cash; Baldwin; Hulse	David Leonard; Brad King; Seth Talley	5:10
6.	"Best Friends" (featuring Molly Skaggs)	Aodhan King; Ben Tan; Benjamin Hastings; Joshua Grimmett; Karina Wykes	David Leonard; Brad King; Seth Talley	4:31
7.	"My King Forever"	Brian Johnson; Baldwin; Hulse	David Leonard; Brad King; Seth Talley	5:10
8.	"Mighty God"	Cash; Baldwin; Hulse	Ed Cash	4:21
9.	"My Hands Are Open"	Johnson; Leslie Jordan; Baldwin; Hulse; Tim Skipper; Stephanie Skipper	David Leonard; Brad King; Seth Talley	4:03
10.	"No Limit"	Matt Armstrong; Bobby Strand; Josh Baldwin; Ethan Hulse	David Leonard; Brad King; Seth Talley	3:52
11.	"Safe in Your Arms" (featuring Kalley)	Colby Wedgeworth; Kalley Heiligenthal; Baldwin; Hulse	David Leonard; Brad King; Seth Talley	4:39
Total length:				47:26

Evidence — Deluxe edition
No.	Title	Length
12.	"Into the Wild" (Music Video)	4:05
13.	"Evidence" (Acoustic Studio Version; Music Video)	4:29
14.	"Best Friends" (Acoustic Studio Version; Music Video)	4:20
15.	"Your Voice" (Song Story, Acoustic Version; Music Video)	4:08
Total length:		64:28

- Songwriting credits adapted from PraiseCharts.

== Charts ==
Chart (2020)	Peak position
US Christian Albums (Billboard)	41

== Release history ==
Region	Date	Version	Format	Label	Ref.
Various	October 2, 2020	Standard	CD; Digital download; streaming	Bethel Music	
Various	October 2, 2020	Deluxe	CD; Digital download; streaming	Bethel Music	
