= Josh Baldwin =

American Christian musician and worship pastor

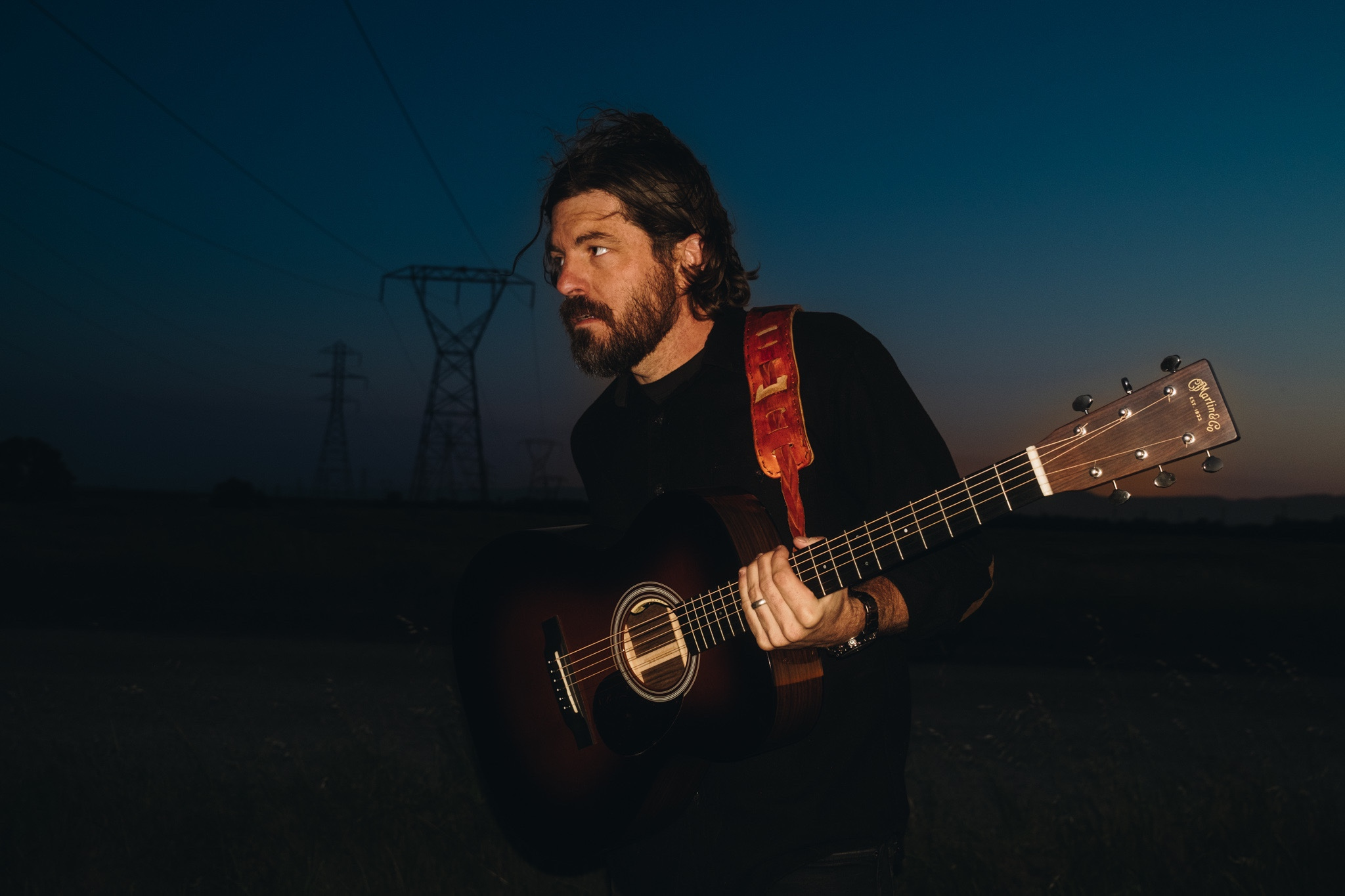

Background information
- Born: Joshua Aaron Baldwin; July 8, 1979 (age 47); Albemarle, North Carolina, U.S.
- Origin: Charlotte, North Carolina
- Genres: Praise & worship; CCM; country; alternative rock
- Occupations: Singer; songwriter; worship pastor
- Instruments: Vocals; guitar; drums
- Years active: 2008–present
- Labels: Watershed Music; Bethel Music
- Member of: Bethel Music
- Website: joshbaldwin.com

Joshua Aaron Baldwin (born July 8, 1979) is an American Christian singer, songwriter and worship pastor. A member of the Bethel Music collective.

Josh Baldwin started serving as a worship leader at MorningStar Fellowship Church after attending the ministry school there. He independently released Changing, his first album, in 2008. In 2010, Baldwin then joined Queen City Church in Charlotte, North Carolina, serving as worship pastor. Baldwin released Rivers in 2014, earning him his first Billboard chart appearance with a placement on the US Heatseekers Albums.

Josh Baldwin signed with Bethel Music in 2014. Baldwin made his first feature on a Bethel Music collective release, Have It All (2016), with the song "Praises (Be Lifted Up)". Baldwin then released The War Is Over, his first solo effort with the label in mid-2017 to critical acclaim and the album debuted in the top-three sector of the American and British Christian music charts.

Bethel Music and Josh Baldwin released the song "Stand in Your Love" in 2018, as the lead single to Victory (2019). The song reached the top ten of the US Christian Songs chart, Baldwin's first entry on the chart. It also garnered Baldwin's first nominations for the 2019 K-Love Fan Awards in the Breakout Single of the Year and Worship Song of the Year categories.

== Early life ==
Joshua Aaron Baldwin was born on July 8, 1979, to William Baldwin, a pastor, and Kathy Baldwin in Albemarle, North Carolina. Baldwin shared that his father was also a worship leader and is "very much into music," and grew up playing drums for him and other worship leaders. He started leading worship and playing guitar during his high school years, learning at Albemarle High School. Baldwin was studying at Lee University when he first realized that he wanted to be a worship leader after leading at a youth camp in North Carolina. He dropped out of Lee University and enrolled at MorningStar Ministry School, attending together with John Mark McMillan and Jonathan David Helser.

== Career ==
Josh Baldwin started his career with MorningStar in early 2008, featuring on two albums: Worship and Warfare, Vol. 3 with the song "After You"; and Jesus Broken with "Love You Only". He was a part of MorningStar Fellowship Church for nine years, and he also travelled with artists Rita Springer and Suzy Yaraei working as a drummer. Baldwin served as the worship minister at MorningStar in Wilkesboro, North Carolina. On September 3, 2008, Josh Baldwin independently released his debut album, Changing. Baldwin then moved to Charlotte, North Carolina, to serve as worship pastor of Queen City Church.

On September 17, 2013, Josh Baldwin launched a Kickstarter funding campaign to raise $12,000 for a new worship album's mixing, mastering, printing, and artwork to be completed. The campaign was a success, with 202 backers pledging $12,635, with a twenty two day period that ended on October 10, 2013. Baldwin released Rivers, his sophomore album on January 28, 2014, in partnership with Watershed Music. Rivers peaked at No. 44 on the Heatseekers Albums chart issued by Billboard, his first entry on a Billboard's chart. In 2014, Baldwin went on to sign a record deal with Bethel Music during a week-long visit with his wife to Redding, California after discussions with Brian Johnson, whom he knew since meeting in 2007. On March 11, 2016, Bethel Music released its eighth live album, Have It All, with Baldwin performing a live cover of his song, "Praises (Be Lifted Up)".

Josh Baldwin released his first album with Bethel Music, The War Is Over, on May 26, 2017. It earned sales of 3,000 equivalent album units in its opening week and debuted at No. 2 on the US Christian Albums chart dated June 17, 2017, issued by Billboard. The album also debuted at No. 3 on the Official Christian & Gospel Albums Chart in the United Kingdom. "Get Your Hopes Up" was released as the first single from the album.

On July 19, 2018, Bethel Music and Josh Baldwin published the song "Stand in Your Love" on YouTube. They subsequently released "Stand in Your Love" on August 10, 2018, as the first single from the Bethel Music's album, Victory (2019). The single was a hit, became his first entry on the US Christian Songs chart, and peaked at No. 7. It garnered nominations for 2019 K-Love Fan Awards in the Breakout Single of the Year and Worship Song of the Year categories. On July 19, 2019, Josh Baldwin released "Let the Redeemed" as a single.

== Personal life ==
Josh Baldwin married Sheila Strite and they have two children, Ellie and Bear.

== Discography ==
=== Albums ===
List of albums, with selected chart positions
| Title | Album details | Peak chart positions | | | | Sales |
| Title | Album details | US Christ. | US Ind. | US Heat. | UK C&G | Sales |
|---|---|---|---|---|---|---|
| Changing | Debut album; Released: July 10, 2008; Label: Independent; Format: CD, digital download, streaming | — | — | — | — | |
| Rivers | Released: September 1, 2014; Label: Watershed Music; Format: CD, digital download, streaming | — | — | 44 | — | |
| The War Is Over | Released: May 26, 2017; Label: Bethel Music; Format: CD, digital download, streaming | 2 | 8 | — | 3 | US: 3,000 |
| Evidence | Released: October 2, 2020; Label: Bethel Music; Format: CD, digital download, streaming | 41 | — | — | — | |
| Where the Glory Is | Released: October 21, 2022; Label: Bethel Music; Format: CD, digital download, streaming | — | — | — | — | |
| Made for More | Released: March 1, 2024; Label: Bethel Music; Format: Digital download, streaming | 50 | — | — | — | |
"—" denotes a recording that did not chart

=== Extended plays ===
- Live at Church (EP) (2020)

=== Singles ===
==== As lead artist ====
List of singles and peak chart positions
| Single | Year | Chart positions | | | | Certifications | Album |
| Single | Year | US Christ. | US Christ. Airplay | US Christ. AC | US Christ. Digital | Certifications | Album |
|---|---|---|---|---|---|---|---|
| "Get Your Hopes Up" | 2017 | — | — | — | — | | The War Is Over |
| "Stand in Your Love" (with Bethel Music) | 2018 | 7 | 2 | 2 | 10 | RIAA: Gold | Victory |
| "Let the Redeemed" | 2019 | 18 | 12 | 15 | 20 | | Live at Church (EP) |
| "Evidence" | 2020 | 7 | 4 | 6 | 9 | | Evidence |
| "Evidence (Live)" (featuring Dante Bowe) | 2021 | — | — | — | — | | Non-album single |
| "Into the Wild" | 2021 | 35 | 20 | — | — | | Evidence |
| "There Is Freedom" | 2022 | 30 | 21 | 23 | — | | Where the Glory Is |
| "Every Hour" (with David Leonard) | 2023 | 50 | 26 | — | — | | Plans |
| "Made for More" (with Jenn Johnson) | 2023 | 5 | 1 | 1 | — | | Non-album singles |
| "Thank You Jesus" | 2025 | — | — | — | — | | Non-album singles |
| "Whole Heart" | 2026 | 31 | — | — | — | | Worth Everything |
"—" denotes a recording that did not chart

==== As featured artist ====
List of featured singles and peak chart positions
| Single | Year | Chart positions | | | Album |
| Single | Year | US Christ. | US Christ. Airplay | US Christ. AC | Album |
|---|---|---|---|---|---|
| "I Don't Have Much" (Mission House featuring Josh Baldwin, Taylor Leonhardt and Jess Ray) | 2021 | — | — | — | Non-album single |
| "God You Are" (We Are Messengers featuring Josh Baldwin) | 2022 | 28 | 27 | 22 | Wholehearted |
"—" denotes a recording that did not chart

=== Other appearances ===
| Song | Year | Album | Ref. |
|---|---|---|---|
| "After You" (MorningStar and Josh Baldwin) | 2008 | Worship and Warfare, Vol. 3 | |
| "Love You Only" (MorningStar and Josh Baldwin) | 2008 | Jesus Broken | |
| "Praises (Be Lifted Up)" (MorningStar and Josh Baldwin featuring Andrew Williams) | 2015 | Wild Love | |
| "Praises (Be Lifted Up)" (Bethel Music and Josh Baldwin) | 2016 | Have It All | |
| "Bendice al Señor" (Christine D'Clario featuring Josh Baldwin) | 2018 | Emanuel | |
| "Adorar Sin Cesar" (Bethel Music and Josh Baldwin featuring Edward Rivera) | 2019 | Bethel Music en Español | |
| "Stand in Your Love" (Bethel Music and Josh Baldwin) | 2020 | Peace | |
| "My Hands Are Open" (Bethel Music and Josh Baldwin) | 2020 | Revival's in the Air | |
| "Middle of the Fire" (Rebecca St. James and Josh Baldwin) | 2020 | Dawn | |
| "My King Forever" (Bethel Music and Josh Baldwin) | 2021 | Homecoming | |

== Awards ==
=== GMA Dove Awards ===
| Year | Nominee / work | Award | Result |
|---|---|---|---|
| 2019 | Josh Baldwin | New Artist of the Year | Nominated |
| 2019 | "Stand in Your Love" | Worship Recorded Song of the Year | Nominated |
| 2023 | Made for More (Live) | Recorded Music Packaging of the Year | Nominated |
| 2026 | Full Grown Man, Vol. 1 | Bluegrass/Country/Roots Album of the Year | Pending |

=== K-Love Fan Awards ===
| Year | Nominee / work | Award | Result |
|---|---|---|---|
| 2026 | "Mighty Name of Jesus" | Worship Song of the Year | Pending |

== See also ==
- List of Christian worship music artists
