= Wholehearted =

Studio album by We Are Messengers
- Released: 15 October 2021
- Recorded: 2020–2021
- Genre: CCM; worship
- Length: 42:47
- Label: Word Entertainment
- Producer: Jeff Pardo; Apollo LTD; Matt Maher; Darren Mulligan; Kyle Williams; Benjamin Backus; Chris Stevens; Bryan Fowler

We Are Messengers chronology
Power (2020)	Wholehearted (2021)

Wholehearted +
- Wholehearted + cover

Singles from Wholehearted
- 1. "Come What May" Released: 11 June 2021; 2. "God You Are" Released: 8 April 2022

Wholehearted is the third studio album by American worship band We Are Messengers, released via Word Entertainment on 15 October 2021. The album features guest appearances by Josh Baldwin, Cory Asbury, and Vince Gill. The album was produced by Jeff Pardo, Apollo LTD, Matt Maher, Darren Mulligan, Kyle Williams, Benjamin Backus, Chris Stevens, and Bryan Fowler.

The album was supported by the release of "Come What May" and "God You Are" as singles. "Come What May" peaked at No. 2 on the US Hot Christian Songs chart. "God You Are" peaked at No. 35 on the Hot Christian Songs chart. "Friend of Sinners" was released as a promotional single.

Wholehearted was released to mostly positive reviews from critics who praised the band's lyrical depth and sincerity in the songs, while bemoaning the album's radio-friendly sound. The album debuted at No. 15 on Billboard's Top Christian Albums chart in the United States. At the 2022 GMA Dove Awards, "Come What May" received a GMA Dove Award nomination for Song of the Year.

== Background ==
In August 2021, We Are Messengers announced that they will release their third studio album, Wholehearted, on 15 October 2021. The album was written and recorded during the COVID-19 pandemic, the band stating on social media the shutting down of tours led them to write new music as a way to process and document their feelings in an attempt to "make sense of a strange new world." Mulligan collaborated with acclaimed songwriters such as Kyle Williams, Phil Wickham, Ethan Hulse, Adam Stark and Jordan Phillips from Apollo LTD, Ryan Ellis and Benjamin Backus, among others. The music videos for the album were filmed in the hometown of lead singer Darren Mulligan in Ireland, showcasing the beauty of the country. Mulligan stressed that the importance of filming of the music videos in Ireland was to serve as a reminder of who they are and where they come from, remembering that their success is a gift "and is from the simple kindness of God."

== Music and lyrics ==
Musically, Wholehearted has been described by Lindsay Williams of K-Love "the group’s most pop-centric offering yet." Williams stated that the songs are "primed for packed singalongs as the band gets back on tour." Jesus Freak Hideout categorised the album as "pop / worship" while reviewer Joel Zaloum noted a departure from the sonical variety of We Are Messengers' previous releases, saying the album contains "mostly mid-tempo pop that you'd find on most Christian radio stations." Timothy Yap of JubileeCast also noted the radio-friendliness of the tracks, saying "The melodic progression of most of the songs are so tailored made for radio, that it is predictable." 365 Days of Inspiring Media's Joshua Andre noted that the band "don’t do that much to reinvent the wheel of worship and CCM."

Lyrically, Darren Mulligan described the album as holding nothing back, while giving a 360 view of their experience and spiritual journey over the two years preceding the album's release. Joshua Andre noted that the album conveys "heart, soul, passion, and a zeal for Christ." Joel Zaloum stated that "The message of God's grace given to undeserving sinners permeates the entire album." Timothy Yap observed that the album thematically revolves around "issues such as God's goodness, presence, and sovereignty over our circumstances." Kelly Meade of Today's Christian Entertainment said the album contains "songs of God’s unwavering faithfulness and love while not covering up our struggles and questions we have as humans navigating our journey of faith."

== Release and promotion ==
=== Singles ===
"Come What May" was released on 11 June 2021 as the lead single from the album. The single impacted Christian radio stations in the United States on 16 July 2021. The music video for "Come What May" was published on 30 July 2021. On 10 September 2021, We Are Messengers released a new version of the song, titled "Come What May +" featuring Cory Asbury. The song peaked at No. 2 on the US Hot Christian Songs chart, and No. 19 on the Bubbling Under Hot 100 chart. "Come What May" reached No. 1 on the Christian Airplay chart dated 29 January 2022, becoming the band's first chart-topping song on Christian Airplay. "Come What May" received a GMA Dove Award nomination for Song of the Year at the 2022 GMA Dove Awards.

On 14 March 2022, the radio promotion team of Word Entertainment announced that "God You Are" would impact Christian radio stations in the United States on 8 April 2022. "God You Are" peaked at No. 30 on the Hot Christian Songs chart.

=== Promotional singles ===
On 13 August 2021, We Are Messengers launched the digital pre-order of the album, releasing "God You Are" featuring Josh Baldwin as the first instant grat track from the album, accompanied with its lyric video. The music video for "God You Are" was published on 3 September 2021.

On 17 September 2021, We Are Messengers released "Friend of Sinners" as the second instant grat track from the album, accompanied with its lyric video.

=== Other songs ===
We Are Messengers published the music video for "Wholehearted" on 22 October 2021. On 12 November 2021, We Are Messengers issued the music video for "Holding On." On 10 December 2021, We Are Messengers released the music video for "Now It's Our Turn." On 21 January 2022, We Are Messengers released the music video for "Close." On 4 February 2022, We Are Messengers availed the music video for "Loved Like This."

== Touring ==
On 17 February 2022, We Are Messengers announced that they will be embarking on The Wholehearted Tour featuring Apollo LTD and Stephen Stanley as special guests, in the spring of 2022. The tour will span 17 dates across venues in the United States, commencing at the Family Worship Center in Marshall, Missouri, on 7 April 2022, and concluding at Connections Church in Savannah, Georgia on 7 May 2022.

== Critical reception ==
Professional ratings
Review scores
Source	Rating
365 Days of Inspiring Media	4.5/5
Jesus Freak Hideout	3/5 stars
JubileeCast	3/5
Today's Christian Entertainment	4.7/5 stars

Joshua Andre in his 365 Days of Inspiring Media review opined that "Wholehearted is emotional, personal and honest. It’s not as flashy nor grandiose. It’s sometimes cliché lyrically, but there’s that sense of rawness and realness about the album as well." Jesus Freak Hideout's Joel Zaloum wrote in his three star review: "The message of Wholehearted is timely and rests on biblical foundations, but the energy seems a bit low and certainly doesn't match up to their bubbly debut. The band, for the most part, stays within radio friendly confines, with less dynamic variety than previous efforts. Still, if you're in need of an encouraging word, or are looking for deeper biblical content than most Christian pop, you'll find much to enjoy here." Timothy Yap of JubileeCast acknowledged that while the album had was set apart as a result of the band going "deeper lyrically than many of their peers," his major complaint lied with the album's production, saying "Wholehearted sounds like everything you loathe about Christian radio." Kelly Meade praised the album in her review at Today's Christian Entertainment, "Each track will connect with listeners in some way as the lyrics keep it real while directing our focus to strengthening our relationship with God. With lead singer Darren Mulligan's signature vocals and the band’s genre-blending musical sound along with the overall message of the album make Wholehearted one of the best of We Are Messengers' career thus far and a must listen." Caitlin Lassiter issued a positive review of the album for Worship Leader, saying: "Wholehearted is We Are Messengers’ best work to date. Not only is the musicality and production next level for the band, but the songwriting is Mulligan and his crew of co-writers at the top of their game. This record is sure to encourage all who hear it."

== Commercial performance ==
In the United States, Wholehearted debuted at No. 15 on Top Christian Albums chart dated 30 October 2021.

== Track listing ==
Wholehearted track listing
No.	Title	Writer(s)	Producer(s)	Length
1.	"Wholehearted"	Darren Mulligan; Jeff Pardo	Jeff Pardo	3:02
2.	"Come What May"	Mulligan; Pardo	Jeff Pardo	3:21
3.	"Now It's Our Turn"	Mulligan; Kyle Williams; Mitch Wong	Apollo LTD	3:07
4.	"God You Are" (featuring Josh Baldwin)	Mulligan; Williams; Phil Wickham	Matt Maher	4:25
5.	"Friend of Sinners"	Mulligan; Ethan Hulse; Pardo	Jeff Pardo	3:22
6.	"Million Miles Away"	Adam Stark; Mulligan; Jordan Phillips	Apollo LTD	3:38
7.	"Keep the Faith"	Mulligan; David Spencer	Apollo LTD	3:29
8.	"Close"	Brian Bunn; Brian White; Mulligan	Apollo LTD	3:42
9.	"Faith Sees Best in the Dark"	Mulligan; Williams	Darren Mulligan; Kyle Williams	3:46
10.	"Loved Like This"	Mulligan; Williams	Darren Mulligan; Kyle Williams	4:18
11.	"Holding On"	Mulligan; Williams; Ryan Ellis	Darren Mulligan; Kyle Williams	3:16
12.	"The Parting Glass"	Benjamin Backus; Mulligan	Benjamin Backus	3:23
Total length:				42:27

Wholehearted + track listing
No.	Title	Writer(s)	Producer(s)	Length
13.	"Come What May +" (with Cory Asbury)	Mulligan; Pardo	Jeff Pardo	3:21
14.	"Image Of God (Acoustic) +" (with Vince Gill)	Bryan Fowler; Chris Stevens; Mulligan	Chris Stevens; Bryan Fowler	3:48
15.	"Wholehearted (Acoustic) +"	Mulligan; Pardo	Jeff Pardo	3:06
16.	"Friend Of Sinners (Acoustic) +"	Mulligan; Hulse; Pardo	Jeff Pardo	3:22
17.	"Come What May (Acoustic) +" (with Cory Asbury)	Mulligan; Pardo	Jeff Pardo	3:25
Total length:				42:27

== Charts ==
Chart performance for Wholehearted
Chart (2021)	Peak position
US Top Christian Albums (Billboard)	15

== Release history ==
Release history and formats for Wholehearted
Region	Date	Edition	Format	Label	Ref.
Various	15 October 2021	Standard	CD; digital download; streaming; vinyl	Word Entertainment	
Various	15 October 2021	Deluxe (Wholehearted +)	CD; digital download; streaming; vinyl	Word Entertainment	
