= Stand in Your Love =

Single by Bethel Music and Josh Baldwin

from the album Victory
- Released: August 10, 2018
- Recorded: 2018
- Length: 3:41
- Label: Bethel Music
- Songwriters: Ethan Hulse; Josh Baldwin; Mark Harris; Rita Springer
- Producer: Ed Cash

Bethel Music singles chronology
"Living Hope" (2018)	"Stand in Your Love" (2018)	"Raise a Hallelujah" (2019)

Josh Baldwin singles chronology
"Get Your Hopes Up" (2017)	"Stand in Your Love" (2018)	"Let the Redeemed" (2019)

Music videos
- "Stand in Your Love" (Live) on YouTube
- "Stand in Your Love" (Lyrics) on YouTube

Audio sample
- "Stand in Your Love": file; help

"Stand in Your Love" is a single released by Bethel Music and Josh Baldwin on August 10, 2018, being the lead single for Bethel Music's eleventh live album, Victory (2019). The song also appeared on the album Bethel Music en Español (2019). The song was written by Ethan Hulse, Josh Baldwin, Mark Harris and Rita Springer. Ed Cash handled the production of the single. "Stand in Your Love" is composed in the key of C with a tempo of 72.5 beats per minute and a musical time signature of 4/4. It became Baldwin's first entry on Billboard's US Christian Songs chart, peaking at No. 7.

== Background ==
Caleb Parke of Fox News first reported in an article that "Stand in Your Love" would be released by Josh Baldwin in July 2018. A live performance video of Josh Baldwin singing the song at Heaven Come Conference 2018 was published on YouTube by Bethel Music in July 2018. Bethel Music then released the radio-adapted version of "Stand in Your Love" on August 10, 2018 in digital format. The song impacted Christian radio in the United States on August 17, 2018.

== Writing and development ==
Josh Baldwin had an interview with Kevin Davis, lead contributor at NewReleaseToday about the song and the inspiration behind it. Davis asked about the personal story behind the song, to which Baldwin responded, saying:

The song kind of came out of nowhere for me. I hadn't been doing too much songwriting at the time as I had just released my album The War Is Over, and wasn't in a season of thinking much about new songs. I was in Dallas, Texas on a trip and I ended up staying an extra day and stayed with Rita Springer and Mark Harris at Gateway Church. I was hanging out and they were writing songs for their Gateway album and I ended up staying and writing this song with them. Another guy named Ethan Hulse from Nashville who I had just met that day came in to tell us he was leaving and told us he had this song idea and the chorus. I was blown away and knew we needed to jump on it. He had about 45 minutes before he had to leave and we finished the song from there.

– Josh Baldwin, NewReleaseToday

== Music videos ==
The live music video of "Stand in Your Love" as sung by Josh Baldwin at the Verizon Theater at Grand Prairie during Heaven Come Conference 2018 was published on Bethel Music's YouTube channel on July 19, 2018. On January 25, 2019, Bethel Music released the official lyric video of the song's album version on YouTube.

== Accolades ==
Awards
Year	Organization	Award	Result	Ref.
2019	GMA Dove Awards	Worship Recorded Song of the Year	Nominated	

== Track listing ==
Stand in Your Love (Radio Version)
No.	Title	Writer(s)	Length
1.	"Stand in Your Love" (Radio Version)	Ethan Hulse; Josh Baldwin; Mark Harris; Rita Springer	3:41

== Charts ==
=== Weekly charts ===
Radio version
Chart (2018–19)	Peak position
US Hot Christian Songs (Billboard)	7

Live version
Chart (2019)	Peak position
US Hot Christian Songs (Billboard)	36

=== Year-end charts ===
Chart (2018)	Peak position
US Christian Songs (Billboard)	60
Chart (2019)	Position
US Christian Songs (Billboard)	19
US Christian Airplay (Billboard)	8
US Christian AC (Billboard)	11

== Certifications ==
Region	Certification	Certified units/sales
United States (RIAA)	Gold	500,000^{‡}
^{‡} Sales+streaming figures based on certification alone.

== Release history ==
Region	Date	Format	Label	Ref.
Various	August 10, 2018	digital download; streaming	Bethel Music	
United States	August 17, 2018	Christian radio	Bethel Music	
