= Come What May (We Are Messengers song) =

2021 single by We Are Messengers

Single by We Are Messengers

from the album Wholehearted
- Released: 11 June 2021
- Genre: CCM
- Length: 3:21
- Label: Word Entertainment
- Songwriters: Darren Mulligan; Jeff Pardo
- Producer: Jeff Pardo

We Are Messengers singles chronology
| "Image of God" (2021) | "Come What May" (2021) | "God You Are" (2022) |

Come What May +
- "Come What May +" cover

Cory Asbury singles chronology
| "Egypt (Studio Version)" (2021) | "Come What May +" (2021) | "You Will Be Found" (2022) |

Music videos
- "Come What May" on YouTube
- "Come What May" (Lyrics) on YouTube
- "Come What May +" on YouTube
- "Come What May +" (Lyrics) on YouTube

"Come What May" is a song by American worship band We Are Messengers. The song was released as the lead single to their third studio album, Wholehearted (2021), on 11 June 2021. The song was written by Darren Mulligan and Jeff Pardo. Jeff Pardo produced the single.

"Come What May" peaked at No. 2 on the US Hot Christian Songs chart. The song also went on to peak at No. 19 on the Bubbling Under Hot 100 chart. At the 2022 GMA Dove Awards, "Come What May" was nominated for the GMA Dove Award for Song of the Year.

== Background ==
On 11 June 2021, We Are Messengers released "Come What May" as the lead single to their third studio album, Wholehearted (2021). The single impacted Christian radio stations in the United States on 16 July 2021. On 10 September 2021, We Are Messengers released a new version of the song, titled "Come What May +" featuring Cory Asbury.

Darren Mulligan shared that the song was inspired his parents, saying:

They learned that circumstances did not determine their joy or fullness of life. And that come what may that had everything they needed. Because they belonged. They’d been loved by those who came before them and are loved by those who cherish them now.

== Composition ==
"Come What May" is composed in the key of F♯ with a tempo of 86.5 beats per minute and a musical time signature of 6/8.

== Reception ==
=== Critical response ===
Jonathan Andre of 365 Days of Inspiring Media described the song in his review as "a song that ticks all the right boxes. It has soaring harmonies and a great melodic hook. It has Darren's trademark Irish accent coming through in the song, as well as the song itself being one of triumphing over whatever comes our way." Andre however, noted that the song was not as catchy nor as memorable as "Everything Comes Alive" or "Maybe It's Ok". Jesus Freak Hideout's Joel Zaloum noted that "there's a certain conviction in Mulligan's voice and writing, as of someone who isn't just checking off boxes or using 'Christianese,' but one who's experienced God's forgiveness personally" which made the track "immensely powerful." Kelly Meade in her Today's Christian Entertainment's review, said the song is "a faith-filled anthem declaring a trust in the steadiness of Jesus through everything we face in life."

=== Accolades ===
Awards
| Year | Organization | Award | Result | Ref |
|---|---|---|---|---|
| 2022 | GMA Dove Awards | Song of the Year | Nominated | |

== Commercial performance ==
"Come What May" debuted at No. 45 on the US Christian Airplay chart dated 17 July 2021. "Come What May" reached No. 1 on the Christian Airplay chart dated 29 January 2022.

"Come What May" debuted at No. 45 on the US Hot Christian Songs chart dated 7 August 2021.

== Music videos ==
We Are Messengers uploaded the official lyric video of "Come What May" on YouTube on 11 June 2021. The music video of "Come What May" was published on We Are Messengers' YouTube channel on 30 July 2021. The "Come What May +" official music video and lyric video were released via YouTube on 10 September 2021.

== Track listing ==
"Come What May"
| No. | Title | Length |
|---|---|---|
| 1. | "Come What May" | 3:21 |

"Come What May +"
| No. | Title | Length |
|---|---|---|
| 1. | "Come What May +" (with Cory Asbury) | 3:21 |
| 2. | "Come What May (Acoustic) +" (with Cory Asbury) | 3:25 |
| Total length: | | 6:46 |

== Charts ==
=== Weekly charts ===
Weekly chart performance for "Come What May"
| Chart (2021–2022) | Peak position |
|---|---|
| US Bubbling Under Hot 100 (Billboard) | 19 |
| US Hot Christian Songs (Billboard) | 2 |
| US Christian Airplay (Billboard) | 1 |
| US Christian AC (Billboard) | 2 |

=== Year-end charts ===
Year-end chart performance for "Come What May"
| Chart (2021) | Position |
|---|---|
| US Christian Songs (Billboard) | 78 |
| US Christian Airplay (Billboard) | 42 |
| US Christian AC (Billboard) | 42 |
| Chart (2022) | Position |
| US Christian Songs (Billboard) | 12 |
| US Christian Airplay (Billboard) | 12 |
| US Christian AC (Billboard) | 20 |

== Certifications ==
Certifications for Come What May
| Region | Certification | Certified units/sales |
|---|---|---|
| United States (RIAA) | Gold | 500,000^{‡} |
^{‡} Sales+streaming figures based on certification alone.

== Release history ==
Release dates and formats for "Come What May"
| Region | Date | Version | Format | Label | Ref. |
|---|---|---|---|---|---|
| Various | 11 June 2021 | Album | Digital download; streaming | Word Entertainment | |
| United States | 16 July 2021 | Album | Christian radio | Word Entertainment | |
| Various | 10 September 2021 | + (with Cory Asbury) | Digital download; streaming | Word Entertainment | |
