= The Remission Flow =

Irish Christian rock band

- Origin: Monaghan, Ireland
- Genres: CCM, Christian rock, Christian alternative rock, worship, indie rock
- Years active: 2012–2014
- Label: 7Core
- Past members: Darren Mulligan; Trevor Brimage; Mark Allister; Raymond Douglas; Mark Mulligan; Lorraine Brimage; Heidi Mulligan

The Remission Flow was an Irish Christian rock worship band from Monaghan, Ireland, and they formed in 2010 and disbanded in 2014. Their members are Darren Mulligan, Trevor Brimage, Mark Allister, Raymond Douglas, Mark Mulligan, Lorraine Brimage, and Heidi Mulligan. They released, The Light That Floods, with 7Core Music, in 2012. The same label released, Rhythms of Grace, in 2014.

== Background ==
The Christian rock worship band formed in Monaghan, Ireland, in 2012. The band members was leading vocalist and guitarist, Darren Mulligan, guitarist and background vocalist, Trevor Brimage, bass guitarist, Mark Allister, keyboardist, Raymond Douglas, drummer, Mark Mulligan, and background vocalists, Lorraine Brimage and Heidi Mulligan. The group disbanded in October 2014 because Darren and his wife, Heidi, signed a record deal with Word Records, where they formed the new band, We Are Messengers, in Nashville, Tennessee.

== Music history ==
The group formed in 2012, with their first studio album, The Light That Floods, released by 7Core Music on 15 October 2012. Their second album with the aforementioned label, Rhythms of Grace, released on 22 April 2014.

== Members ==
Members

- Darren Mulligan – lead vocals, guitar
- Trevor Brimage – guitar, background vocals
- Mark Allister – bass
- Raymond Douglas – keys
- Mark Mulligan – drums
- Lorraine Brimage – background vocals
- Heidi Mulligan – background vocals

== Discography ==
Studio albums

- The Light That Floods (15 October 2012, 7Core)
- Rhythms of Grace (22 April 2014, 7Core)
