= Hello Human =

Studio album by Apollo LTD
- Released: April 19, 2024
- Genre: Contemporary Christian; Alternative pop; pop/rock
- Length: 44:07
- Language: English
- Label: Residence Records
- Producer: Apollo LTD

Apollo LTD chronology
Nothing Is Ordinary. Everything Is Beautiful. (2021)	Hello Human (2024)

Hello Human is the third studio album by American alternative pop duo Apollo LTD. The album was released on April 19, 2024, through Residence Records, an imprint of Centricity Music. It was released on streaming, digital download, and CD formats.

== Background ==
As a precursor to the album, two extended plays were released, including A Day in the Life on February 16, 2024, and Dreaming on March 15, 2024. Several singles were released off the album, including "Run", released on August 22, 2022, "Soul Worth Saving", released on July 1, 2022, "Living Proof", released on May 12, 2024, and "Future's Calling", released on August 4, 2023.

Apollo LTD member Jordan Phillips stated about the album that it "is an album about the human experience and discovering how God relates to us in every aspect of it." Member Adam Stark stated that the album is about "waking up to the life God intends for us."

== Reception ==
=== Commercial ===
The album featured several significant charting songs, including "Future's Calling", which reached No. 38 on the Billboard Christian Airplay chart, "Redemption Song", which reached No. 43 on the Christian Airplay, and "Soul Worth Saving", which reached No. 24 on the Billboard Christian Airplay chart.

=== Critical ===
Alex Caldwell of Jesus Freak Hideout rated the album 4.5 out of 5 stars, stating that Apollo LTD, "unabashedly makes great pop music".

== Track listing ==
All tracks are written by Adam Stark and Jordan Phillips, except where noted.

No.	Title	Writer(s)	Length
1.	"Breakthrough"	Paul Duncan; Adam Stark; Jordan Philips	4:03
2.	"Dreaming"		3:35
3.	"Soul Worth Saving"	Ethan Hulse; Adam Stark; Jordan Philips	3:46
4.	"Future's Calling"		2:47
5.	"Run"		2:59
6.	"Living Proof"	Paul Duncan; Adam Stark; Jordan Philips	2:49
7.	"Say So (Broken Halo)"	Paul Duncan; Adam Stark; Jordan Philips	2:38
8.	"A Day in the Life"		3:35
9.	"Redemption Song"	Hank Bentley; Jeff Pardo; Adam Stark; Jordan Philips	2:47
10.	"Hooked"	Paul Duncan; Adam Stark; Jordan Philips	3:19
11.	"Undeniably You"	Hank Bentley; Adam Stark; Jordan Philips	4:02
12.	"Who We Are"	Paul Duncan; Adam Stark; Jordan Philips	3:41
13.	"Eden"		3:58
Total length:			44:07
