= Into the Wild (Josh Baldwin song) =

2021 single by Josh Baldwin

Single by Josh Baldwin

from the album Evidence
- Released: May 7, 2021
- Recorded: 2020
- Genre: Contemporary Christian; praise & worship; country
- Length: 3:41
- Label: Bethel Music
- Songwriter(s): Bobby Strand; Ethan Hulse; Josh Baldwin; Steffany Gretzinger
- Producer(s): David Leonard; Brad King; Seth Talley

Josh Baldwin singles chronology
"Evidence (Live)" (2021)	"Into the Wild" (2021)	"There Is Freedom" (2022)

Music video
- "Into the Wild" on YouTube

"Into the Wild" is a song by American Christian singer-songwriter Josh Baldwin that was released via Bethel Music on May 7, 2021, as the second single from his fourth studio album, Evidence (2020). Baldwin co-wrote the song with Bobby Strand, Ethan Hulse, and Steffany Gretzinger.

"Into the Wild" peaked at No. 35 on Billboard's US Hot Christian Songs chart.

== Background ==
On September 16, 2020, Bethel Music announced that "Into the Wild" would be the next single following "Evidence" with its release slated for September 18, 2020, in the lead-up to the release of Baldwin's album Evidence set for October 2, 2020. "Into the Wild" was subsequently released as the album's first promotional single, accompanied with its music video.

== Composition ==
"Into the Wild" is composed in the key of C with a tempo of 104 beats per minute and a musical time signature of 4/4.

== Commercial performance ==
"Into the Wild" debuted at number 26 on the US Christian Airplay chart dated July 3, 2021.

== Music video ==
The music video of "Into the Wild" was released on September 18, 2020, through Bethel Music's YouTube channel.

== Charts ==
Weekly chart performance for "Into the Wild"
Chart (2021)	Peak position
US Christian Songs (Billboard)	35
US Christian Airplay (Billboard)	20

== Release history ==
Release history for "Into the Wild"
Region	Date	Version	Format	Label	Ref.
Various	September 18, 2020	Album	Digital download (promotional release); streaming (promotional release)	Bethel Music	
Various	May 7, 2021	Radio	Digital download; streaming	Bethel Music	
United States	June 18, 2021	Radio	Christian radio	Bethel Music	
