= Honest (EP) =

EP by We Are Messengers
- Released: March 29, 2019
- Genre: Christian Rock
- Length: 22:36
- Label: Word Records | Curb Records

We Are Messengers chronology
We Are Messengers (2016)	Honest (2019)	Power (2019)

Honest is the first EP by We Are Messengers. Word Records in conjunction with Curb Records released the EP on March 29, 2019. It was produced by Tedd Tjornhom and Benjamin Backus.

== Singles ==
The first single, "Maybe It's Ok", was released prior to the EP's release on November 9, 2018. The song peaked at #2 on the Billboard Christian Airplay Charts. The second single, The Devil Is A Liar, was released on January 25, 2019.

== Track listing ==
No.	Title	Lyrics	Length
1.	"Honest"	Petey Martin, Chad Mattson, Darren Mulligan, Tedd Tjornhom	3:00
2.	"Abide"	Mulligan, Tjornhom, Ian Keaggy, Robert Marvin	4:52
3.	"Maybe It's Ok"	Mulligan, Bryan Fowler, Jonathan Smith	3:31
4.	"The Devil Is A Liar"	Mulligan, Tyrus Morgan, Kyle Williams	3:44
5.	"Wolves"	Mulligan, Tjornhom	4:34
6.	"Gold and Glory"	Mulligan, Benjamin Backus, Ross King	2:55
Total length:			22:36

== Charts ==
Chart (2019)	Peak position
US Top Christian Albums (Billboard)	7

== Awards ==
On June 2, 2019, "Maybe It's Ok" won the K-Love Fan Award for Breakout Single.
