= The Light That Floods =

Studio album by The Remission Flow
- Released: 15 October 2012
- Genre: CCM, Christian rock, Christian alternative rock, worship, indie rock
- Length: 53:50
- Label: 7Core

The Remission Flow chronology
| The Light That Floods (2012) | Rhythms of Grace (2014) |

The Light That Floods is the first studio album by The Remission Flow. 7Core Music released the album on 15 October 2012.

== Critical reception ==
Professional ratings
Review scores
| Source | Rating |
|---|---|
| Cross Rhythms | 8/10 squares |
| Louder Than the Music | 4.5/5 stars |

Rating the album an eight out of ten for Cross Rhythms, Josh Ripple describes, "The lyrics rarely fall back on cliché, backed up by a group of musicians who play with an impressive sensitivity to the needs of the song, rather than their own egos, completed by production as solid as a fossilised toffee. While not every song quite stands out as those already mentioned, it's obvious that this is a band with a great deal of potential, and they deserve every good thing that comes their way as a result of this release." Dave Wood, awarding the album four and a half stars at Louder Than the Music, writes, "Rarely does a debut album offer such a rich selection of songs. Musically enjoyable, lyrically intense and thoroughly brilliant, this is an album oozing talent and quality. The Remission Flow know how to combine their song writing and performing abilities to produce something a little bit special."

== Track listing ==
| No. | Title | Length |
|---|---|---|
| 1. | "Walls" | 4:44 |
| 2. | "Take Away" | 3:35 |
| 3. | "The Father's Love" | 5:17 |
| 4. | "Your Word" | 4:49 |
| 5. | "Light Up" | 3:06 |
| 6. | "Wilderness" | 3:19 |
| 7. | "My Saviour Lives" | 6:44 |
| 8. | "All Creation" | 4:51 |
| 9. | "Psalm 121" | 4:50 |
| 10. | "Sleeper" | 5:51 |
| 11. | "Holy" | 6:44 |
| Total length: | | 53:50 |
