= Rhythms of Grace =

Studio album by The Remission Flow
- Released: 22 April 2014
- Genres: Contemporary Christian music, Christian rock
- Length: 40:39
- Label: 7Core

The Remission Flow chronology
The Light That Floods (2012)	Rhythms of Grace (2014)

Rhythms of Grace is the second studio album by The Remission Flow. 7Core Music released the album on 22 April 2014.

== Critical reception ==
Professional ratings
Review scores
Source	Rating
CCM Magazine	3/5 stars
The Christian Music Review Blog	4.5/5
Cross Rhythms	8/10 squares
Indie Vision Music	3/5 stars
Jesus Wired	9.5/10 stars
Louder Than the Music	5/5 stars
New Release Tuesday	4/5 stars
The Phantom Tollbooth	3.5/5

Awarding the album three stars at CCM Magazine, Matt Conner states, The Remission Flow "brings a fresh flavor to familiar refrains of God’s grace and biblical images". Danny McMartin, rating the album an eight out of ten for Cross Rhythms, writes, "'Rhythms Of Grace' keeps the standards high." Giving the album four stars from New Release Tuesday, Marcus Hathcock describes, "If you're looking for the passionate marriage of hymnlike choruses and artful arrangements, this is your band." Derek Walker, indicating in a 3.5 out of five review by The Phantom Tollbooth, says, "If the band works on its lyrics, while retaining its emotional clout and irresistible melodies, The Remission Flow could connect with a lot of people."

Josh Hamm, rating the album three stars for Indie Vision Music, writes, "The Remission Flow leaves me conflicted: Rhythm Of Grace still has vestiges of the cliché riddled CCM that drove me away from most mainstream worship acts, but they have a spark of creativity and a refreshing purpose behind their music that sets them far from the madding crowd." Awarding the album five stars at Louder Than the Music, Jono Davies states, "it's a top quality album from a top quality outfit." Jim Wilkerson, giving the album a 4.5 out of five from The Christian Music Review Blog, says, "All in all this is a really good album and it was refreshing to hear something unique." Signaling in a 9.5 star review by Jesus Wired, Iain Moss describes, "Rhythms Of Grace is astonishingly good, and a marked improved from The Light That Floods, but, as is the case with almost every album, there’s always room for improvement."

== Track listing ==
No.	Title	Length
1.	"Grace and Truth"	3:27
2.	"Before the Dawn"	3:24
3.	"Melody"	3:58
4.	"Turn Around"	3:32
5.	"Fearless"	3:27
6.	"Vast as Oceans"	4:30
7.	"Mercy Endures"	3:53
8.	"More like You"	3:59
9.	"Lay Down"	4:06
10.	"Trust and Obey"	2:36
11.	"It Is Well"	3:47
Total length:		40:39
