= Evidence (Josh Baldwin song) =

2020 song by Josh Baldwin

Single by Josh Baldwin

from the album Evidence
- Released: June 12, 2020
- Recorded: 2020
- Genre: Contemporary Christian; praise & worship; country
- Length: 4:02
- Label: Bethel Music
- Songwriter(s): Ed Cash; Ethan Hulse; Josh Baldwin
- Producer(s): Ed Cash

Josh Baldwin singles chronology
"Let the Redeemed" (2019)	"Evidence" (2020)	"I Don't Have Much" (2021)

Music videos
- "Evidence" (Acoustic) on YouTube
- "Evidence" (Lyrics) on YouTube

"Evidence" is a song by American Christian singer-songwriter Josh Baldwin that was released via Bethel Music on June 12, 2020, as the lead single from his fourth studio album of the same name, Evidence (2020). Baldwin co-wrote the song with Ed Cash and Ethan Hulse.

"Evidence" became Baldwin's second entry on Billboard's US Hot Christian Songs chart, peaking at number seven.

== Background ==
On June 1, 2020, Bethel Music had announced via Daily Play MPE that "Evidence" would be Josh Baldwin's next single, with the song slated to impact Christian radio on July 3, 2020. On June 12, 2020, Bethel Music released "Evidence" as the lead single to his forthcoming release with the label. On September 16, 2020, Bethel Music announced that Evidence will be Baldwin's upcoming release, being slated for October 2, 2020.

== Writing and development ==
Baldwin shared the story behind the song in a video uploaded to YouTube. Baldwin said the following about the song:

The song "Evidence" it just really came out of wanting to sing a song, write a song that talked about my history, our history with the Lord. I think especially nowadays with what's going on with the pandemic and everything that's happening in the world, it's so easy to let fear creep in and let our current situation cloud us, forgetting what the Lord has done for us. I know what things look like right now, but what do I know about the Lord? Well I know that He's always been there for me, He's always good. Through that He's teaching me how to actually walk in that, walk in His victory of what He's done for us.

== Composition ==
"Evidence" is composed in the key of G with a tempo of 70 beats per minute and a musical time signature of 4/4.

== Commercial performance ==
"Evidence" made its debut at No. 41 on the US Hot Christian Songs chart dated August 1, 2021, nearly eight weeks after the song's release. Billboard reported that "Evidence" broke through the top ten of the Hot Christian Songs chart, debuting at No. 10 because of substantial gains in radio airplay, the feat being achieved after spending 25 weeks on the chart.

== Music videos ==
The lyric video of "Evidence" was published on June 12, 2020, on Bethel Music's YouTube channel. The acoustic music video of the song, performed by Josh Baldwin, recorded at Whiskeytown Lake in California was published on June 15, 2020, on Bethel Music's YouTube channel.

== Track listing ==
"Evidence"
No.	Title	Writer(s)	Length
1.	"Evidence" (Radio Version)	Ed Cash; Ethan Hulse; Josh Baldwin	4:02

== Charts ==
=== Weekly charts ===
Weekly chart performance for "Evidence"
Chart (2020)	Peak position
US Christian Songs (Billboard)	7
US Christian Airplay (Billboard)	4
US Christian AC (Billboard)	6

=== Year-end charts ===
Year-end chart performance for "Evidence"
Chart (2020)	Position
US Christian Songs (Billboard)	58
US Christian Airplay (Billboard)	45
Chart (2021)	Position
US Christian Songs (Billboard)	53
US Christian Airplay (Billboard)	36
US Christian AC (Billboard)	37

== Release history ==
Region	Date	Format	Label	Ref.
Various	June 12, 2020	Digital download; streaming	Bethel Music	
United States	July 3, 2020	Christian radio	Bethel Music	

== Live version featuring Dante Bowe ==
"Evidence (Live)"

Single by Josh Baldwin featuring Dante Bowe
- Released: April 2, 2021
- Recorded: 2021
- Length: 6:49
- Label: Bethel Music
- Songwriter(s): Ed Cash; Ethan Hulse; Josh Baldwin
- Producer(s): David Leonard; Brad King; Seth Talley

Josh Baldwin singles chronology
"I Don't Have Much" (2021)	"Evidence (Live)" (2021)	"Into the Wild" (2021)

Dante Bowe singles chronology
"Joyful" (2021)	"Evidence (Live)" (2021)	"See a Victory" (2021)

Music video
- "Evidence" (Live) on YouTube

On February 24, 2021, Josh Baldwin released the acoustic performance video of "Evidence" featuring Dante Bowe. Bethel Music then released the re-imagined version of "Evidence" featuring on April 2, 2021.

=== Background ===
Bethel Music shared the story behind this version, saying:

This stripped down version unfolds into a natural and organic sound for Josh, taking him back to his deep southern roots. Josh describes this song as a journey of coming home, watching as all throughout his history, God has faithfully walked beside him every step of the way.

=== Music video ===
The music video of "Evidence (Live)" was published on February 24, 2021, on Bethel Music's YouTube channel.

=== Track listing ===
"Evidence"
No.	Title	Length
1.	"Evidence" (Live; featuring Dante Bowe)	6:49

=== Release history ===
Region	Date	Format	Label	Ref.
Various	April 2, 2021	Digital download; streaming	Bethel Music	
