= We Are Messengers (album) =

Studio album by We Are Messengers
- Released: 22 April 2016
- Genres: Worship; Christian rock; Christian pop; pop rock; sunshine pop; soft rock
- Length: 50:21
- Labels: Word; Curb; Warner Bros.
- Producers: Josh Bronleewe; Ed Cash; Seth Mosley

We Are Messengers is the debut studio album by American Christian worship band We Are Messengers. Word Records alongside Curb Records released the album on 22 April 2016. They worked with Josh Bronleewe, Ed Cash, and Seth Mosley, in the production of this album.

== Critical reception ==
Professional ratings
Review scores
Source	Rating
365 Days of Inspiring Media	4/5 stars
CCM Magazine	5/5 stars
The Christian Beat	5/5 stars
Cross Rhythms	9/10 squares
Jesus Freak Hideout	3.5/5 stars
New Release Today	4/5 stars
Today's Christian Entertainment	4.5/5 stars
Worship Leader	3.5/5 stars

Matt Conner, giving the album five stars for CCM Magazine, describes, "Allow us to introduce you to the first great debut album of 2016. We Are Messengers is centered on Darren Mulligan's raw testimony, powerful vocal delivery and incredible charisma, with melodies and lyrical arrangements that somehow skew away from the norm in the most compelling way. We Are Messengers self-titled is a powerful, oft hypnotic release that mirrors releases by NEEDTOBREATHE at one point and John Mark McMillan at another." Awarding the album four stars at New Release Today, Jonathan J. Francesco states, "A healthy dose of standout songs propel this release to become one of the year's most promising debuts." Bobby Gilles, allocating the album three and a half stars for Worship Leader, believes, "American rock...shines through on the 14-song record."

Reviewing the album for Charisma, Taylor Berglund states, "With its debut album, the group We Are Messengers serves up 14 songs of contemporary Christian music with a twist of originality. The result is an album that would feel at home on your local Christian radio station but may leave more experimentally inclined listeners looking for more...While not the best album released all year, We Are Messengers shows a lot of promise and potential. Christian radio fans looking for a fresh new voice will be undoubtedly satisfied with this debut." Tony Cummings, rating the album a nine out of ten from Cross Rhythms, writes, "a fine pop rock debut." Sarah Berdon, indicating in a three and a half star review by Jesus Freak Hideout, says, "The messages found throughout these tracks are wonderful, but it is where Mulligan branches into deeper messages that the record truly shines."

Signaling in a four and a half star review at Today's Christian Entertainment, Lauren McLean writes, "this amazing and honest band". Madeleine Dittmer, allotting the album five stars from The Christian Beat, states, "The songs introduce a fresh sound to Christian music, and the lyrics are relatable and thought provoking. This strong debut ensures the band is set to go far in the genre." Specifying in a four star review at 365 Days of Inspiring Media, Joshua Andre describes, "What a brilliant concept and notion that takes time to dwell upon. Well done Darren for a thorough and entirely enjoyable self-titled debut album, that is sure to increase [their] popularity, and win souls for Christ. As I finish listening to this exquisite and unique listening experience, there is only one thing left to do, and that’s to press repeat. Truly, Darren, his wife, and his band of spiritual brothers have created something special."

== Track listing ==
No.	Title	Writer(s)	Length
1.	"Everything Comes Alive"	Darren Mulligan, Josh Bronleewe	3:21
2.	"Point to You"	Mulligan, Seth Mosley, Mulligan	4:00
3.	"I Look Up"	Mulligan, Ed Cash, Scott Cash	3:43
4.	"The River"	Mulligan, Patrick Martin	3:19
5.	"I'm on Fire"	Mulligan, Bronleewe	3:32
6.	"Magnify"	Mulligan, Casey Brown, Jonathan Smith	3:27
7.	"Give It All"	Mulligan, Bronleewe	3:29
8.	"Shadows"	Mulligan, Bronleewe, Molly Reed	3:07
9.	"I Want You"	Mulligan, Martin	3:32
10.	"Dancing in the Dark"	Mulligan, Trevor DeVerteuil	3:49
11.	"Wildfire"	Mulligan, E. Cash	3:44
12.	"My Ghost"	Mulligan, Brandon Collins, Travis Collins	3:27
13.	"Giants Fall"	Mulligan, Mosley	4:05
14.	"I Don't Have All the Answers"	Mulligan, Bronleewe	3:46
Total length:			50:21

== Charts ==
Chart (2016)	Peak position
US Top Christian Albums (Billboard)	10
US Heatseekers Albums (Billboard)	16
