= Let the Redeemed =

Single by Josh Baldwin

from the EP Live at Church
- Released: July 19, 2019
- Recorded: 2019
- Genre: Contemporary Christian; praise & worship; country
- Length: 3:38
- Label: Bethel Music
- Songwriter(s): Bobby Strand; Ethan Hulse; Josh Baldwin; Kalley Heiligenthal
- Producer(s): Ed Cash; Scott Cash

Josh Baldwin singles chronology
"Stand in Your Love" (2018)	"Let the Redeemed" (2019)	"Evidence" (2020)

Music videos
- "Let the Redeemed" (Acoustic) on Apple Music
- "Let the Redeemed" (Live) on YouTube

"Let the Redeemed" is a single by American Christian singer-songwriter Josh Baldwin that was released via Bethel Music on July 19, 2019. The song was written by Bobby Strand, Ethan Hulse, Josh Baldwin and Kalley Heiligenthal.

== Background ==
On June 10, 2019, Bethel Music had announced via Daily Play MPE that "Let the Redeemed" would be Josh Baldwin's next single, with the song slated to impact Christian radio on July 19, 2019. On July 18, 2019, Josh Baldwin announced on social media that he would be releasing a new song the following day. The song was released on July 19, 2019.

Baldwin shared the story behind the song in a video uploaded to YouTube. He shared that the song was inspired by The Passion Translation of Psalm 107:2 which says "Tell the world how he broke through and delivered you from the power of darkness." He also added: "I feel like the power that reaches the people the most is our testimony, the power of our testimony. There’s such hope that comes out when we share what the Lord has done in us with other people. They can see where you’ve been and where you are now and how the Lord redeemed you. The song that probably is the most powerful on earth is the song of the redeemed. And that’s what this song really is."

== Composition ==
"Let the Redeemed" is composed in the key of A with a tempo of 80 beats per minute and a musical time signature of 4/4.

== Music videos ==
The live music video of "Let the Redeemed" performed by Josh Baldwin, recorded at the Heaven Come Conference 2019 at the Microsoft Theatre in Los Angeles, California was published on July 19, 2019, on Bethel Music's YouTube channel. The acoustic music video of the song was released on Apple Music on the same day.

== Track listing ==
Let the Redeemed
No.	Title	Writer(s)	Length
1.	"Let the Redeemed"	Bobby Strand; Ethan Hulse; Josh Baldwin; Kalley Heiligenthal	3:38

Let the Redeemed (Deluxe) — Apple Music exclusive
No.	Title	Length
1.	"Let the Redeemed" (Acoustic)	4:15
2.	"Let the Redeemed"	3:38
3.	"Let the Redeemed" (Acoustic Music Video)	4:25
Total length:		12:18

== Charts ==
=== Weekly charts ===
Chart (2019)	Peak position
US Christian Songs (Billboard)	18
US Christian Airplay (Billboard)	12

=== Year-end charts ===
Chart (2019)	Position
US Christian Songs (Billboard)	92
Chart (2020)	Position
US Christian Songs (Billboard)	80

== Release history ==
Region	Date	Format	Label	Ref.
United States	July 19, 2019	Christian radio	Bethel Music	
Various	July 19, 2019	Digital download; streaming	Bethel Music	
