= We Are Messengers =

American Christian band

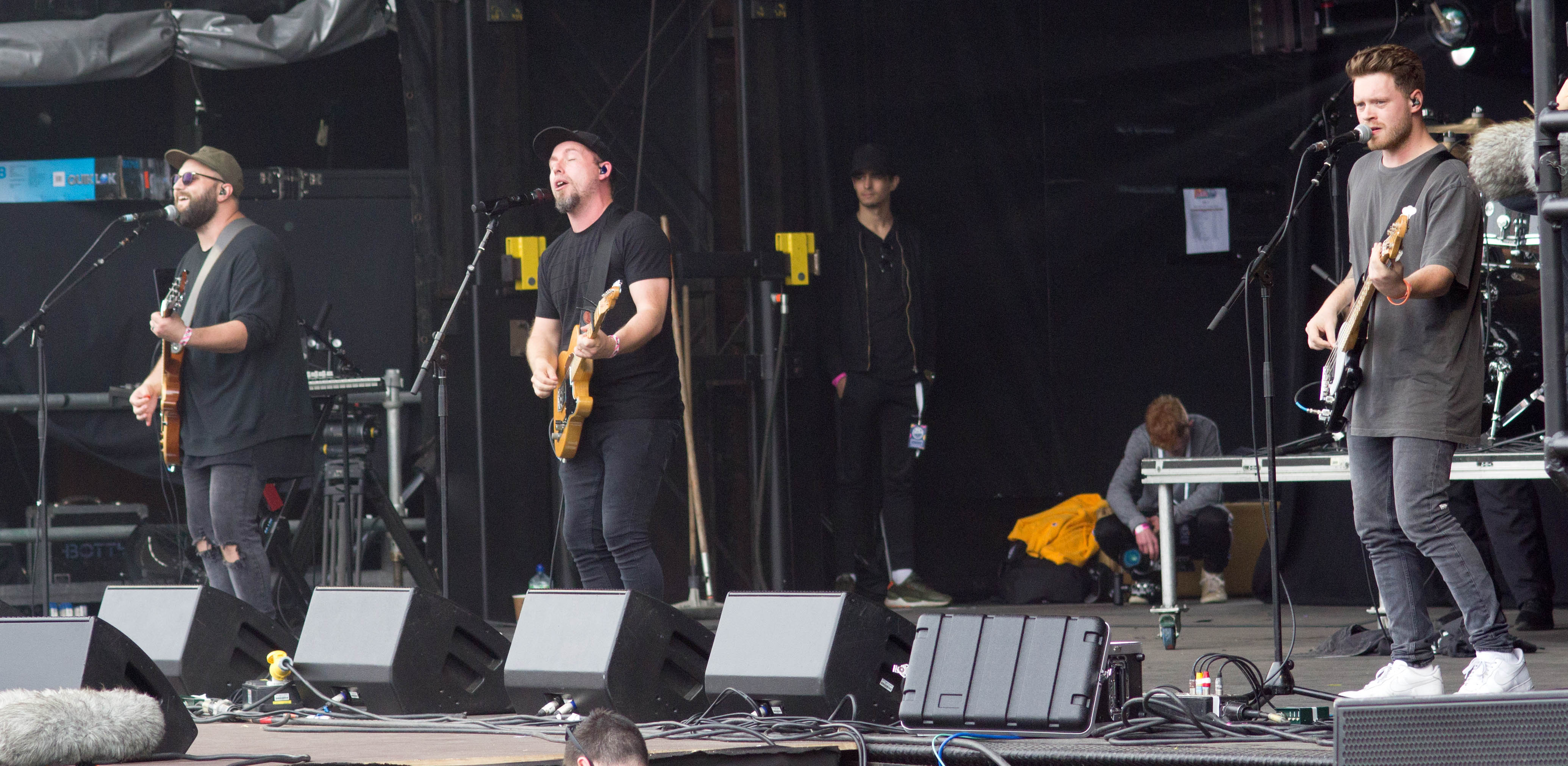
- We Are Messengers performing at BCDO (Big Church Day Out) in Wiston House in West Sussex, England in 2019

Background information
- Origin: Monaghan, Ireland
- Genres: Christian rock; Contemporary Christian music; Christian pop
- Years active: 2015–present
- Labels: Word; Curb; Warner Bros.
- Members: Darren Mulligan
- Website: wearemessengersmusic.com

We Are Messengers are an American Christian band originally from Monaghan, Ireland. They have been based in the US since 2015. Their debut studio album, We Are Messengers, was released in 2016 through Word Records and Curb Records. The album hit the top 10 on Billboard album charts and top 15 on the Billboard Heatseeker charts. The follow-up EP, Honest, was released in 2019 and reached the top 10 of the Billboard Christian Albums chart.

== Background ==
The band formed in Monaghan, Ireland, in 2015. Members in 2021 include Darren Mulligan (lead vocalist), Kyle Williams (vocalist and guitarist), Drew Kerxton (drummer), and Raul Aguilar (bassist).

The group's debut studio album, We Are Messengers, was released on 22 April 2016 through Word Records and Curb Records. This album peaked at No. 10 on the Billboard Top Christian Albums chart and hit No. 16 on the Top Heatseekers Albums. Their second EP, Honest, released on 29 March 2019, charting at No. 7 on the Top Christian Albums chart and No. 44 on the Top Album Sales chart.

The band has had fifteen Billboard Christian Airplay top tens, including "Maybe It's Ok" and "Magnify."

== Members ==
Current

- Darren Mulligan – lead vocals, guitar
- Andrew Pickens - keys
- Thaddeus Johnson – guitar
- Tanner White – bass
- Kenaniah Caron – drums

== Discography ==
=== Studio albums ===
List of studio albums, with selected chart positions
Title	Album details	Peak chart positions	
Title	Album details	US	US Christ
We Are Messengers	Released: April 22, 2016; Label: Curb/Word; Formats: CD, digital download	— (Note: We Are Messengers did not enter the Billboard 200, but peaked at No. 95 on the Top Current Albums chart.)	10
Power	Released: 31 January 2020; Label: Curb/Word; Formats: CD, digital download, streaming	— (Note: Power did not enter the Billboard 200, but peaked at No. 69 on the Top Current Albums chart.)	15
Wholehearted	Released: October 15, 2021; Label: Curb/Word; Formats: CD, LP, digital download, streaming	— (Note: Wholehearted did not enter the Billboard 200, but peaked at No. 70 on the Top Current Albums chart.)	15
Where the Joy Is	Released: April 5, 2024; Label: Curb; Formats: CD, LP, digital download, streaming	—	30
Halfway Home	Releasing: September 25, 2026; Label: Curb; Formats: CD, LP, digital download, streaming	To be released	
"—" denotes a recording that did not chart

=== EPs ===
List of studio albums, with selected chart positions
Title	Album details	Peak chart positions	
Title	Album details	US	US Christ
Honest	Released: March 29, 2019; Label: Word/Curb; Formats: CD, digital download	— (Note: Honest did not enter the Billboard 200, but peaked at No. 44 on the Top Album Sales chart.)	7

=== Singles ===
List of singles, with selected chart positions
Year	Title	Peak chart positions					Certifications	Album
Year	Title	US Bub.	US Christ	US Christ Air	US Christ AC	US Christ Digital	Certifications	Album
2016	"Everything Comes Alive"	—	13	7	6	28		We Are Messengers
2017	"God with Us"	—	29	12	6	—		God with Us EP
2017	"Magnify"	—	10	5	4	28		We Are Messengers
2017	"I'll Think About You"	—	37	—	—	20		We Are Messengers
2017	"Point to You"	—	13	5	9	12		We Are Messengers
2017	"From Heaven to Earth (Joy to the World)"	—	23	7	9	—		God with Us EP
2018	"Needing You Now" (with Meredith Andrews)	—	49	30	29	—		non-album single
2018	"Maybe It's Ok"	—	5	2	2	10	RIAA: Gold	Power
2019	"Power"	—	14	12	9	—		Power
2019	"This Is Jesus" (Note: "This Is Jesus" appears only on the 2019 re-release of God with Us.)	—	29	13	3	—		God with Us EP
2020	"Love"	—	13	9	10	—		Power
2020	"Image of God"	—	12	8	8	20		Power
2021	"Come What May"	19	2	1	2	—	RIAA: Gold	Wholehearted
2022	"God You Are" (featuring Josh Baldwin)	—	28	27	22	—		Wholehearted
2022	"Wholehearted"	29	2	13	2	—		Wholehearted
2022	"Saviour"	—	31	2	3	—		Saviour EP
2023	"Now It’s Our Turn"	—	17	19	2	—		Wholehearted
2023	"God Be the Glory"	—	—	2	5	—		Where the Joy Is
2025	"A Thousand Times"	—	22	9	9	—		Where the Joy Is (Deluxe Edition)
2026	"Faith Hope Love"	—	—	30	22	—		Halfway Home
2026	"Halfway Home"	—	—	—	—	—		Halfway Home
"—" denotes a recording that did not chart

=== Promotional singles ===
List of promotional singles, with selected chart positions
Year	Title	Album
2019	"The Devil Is a Liar"	Honest (EP)

=== Other charted songs ===
List of other charted songs, with selected chart positions
Year	Title	Peak chart positions			Album
Year	Title	US Christ	US Christ Air	US Christ AC	Album
2025	"We Three Kings"	17	1	2	Rejoice! (A Celtic Christmas)

== Compilations ==
- 2016: WOW Hits 2017, "Everything Comes Alive" (from We Are Messengers)
- 2017: WOW Hits 2018, "Magnify" (from We Are Messengers)
- 2017: The Shack Soundtrack, "I'll Think About You"
- 2018: WOW Hits 2019, "Point To You" (from We Are Messengers)

== Awards and nominations ==
GMA Dove Awards

Year	Nominee/work	Award	Result
2016	We Are Messengers	New Artist of the Year	Nominated
2026	"We Three Kings"	Christmas Recorded Song of the Year	Pending
2026	Rejoice! (A Celtic Christmas)	Christmas/Special Event Album of the Year	Pending
