= Maybe It's Ok =

Single by We Are Messengers

from the album Power
- Released: November 9, 2018
- Recorded: 2018
- Genre: Worship; Christian rock; Christian pop
- Length: 3:31
- Label: Word; Curb; Warner Bros.
- Songwriter(s): Jonathan Smith; Darren Mulligan; Bryan Fowler
- Producer(s): Mulligan

We Are Messengers singles chronology
"Point to You" (2017)	"Maybe It's Ok" (2018)	"Power" (2019)

Music video
- "Maybe It's Ok" on YouTube

"Maybe It's Ok" is a single by American worship band We Are Messengers on their second extended-play Honest. Written by Mulligan, Jonathan Smith, and Bryan Fowler, it was released as a single on November 9, 2018. The song peaked at No. 5 on the US Hot Christian Songs chart, becoming their second top ten single and highest charting song. The song is played in a D-flat major key, and 138 beats per minute.

== Background ==
The song was released on November 9, 2018, as the first single from Honest EP. The band's lead singer, Mulligan, explained the meaning behind the song in an interview with "Apostles That Rock" two days after its release,"I believe that God works all things together for the good of those that love Him. But I can't escape the fact that we're hurting, anxious, disappointed, and afraid. This song is my surrender. By admitting that I need God to put everything right. I find that Jesus is with me in the heartache holding onto me and leading through the tough times. Everything sad is being undone. But it's going to take a little time. Getting well is a messy business. So, take it easy on yourself. God has taken every mistake, every hurt, and make it something really beautiful. I'm in the reality of where I am right here, right now, and I'm trusting in Jesus. I've realized, maybe it's okay, even when I'm not okay." A lyric video was released on December 21, 2018.

== Composition ==
"Maybe It's Ok" is originally in the key of D-flat major, with a tempo of 138 beats per minute. Written in common time, Mulligan's vocal range spans from A_{3} to F_{2} during the song.

== Critical reception ==
"CrossRhythms" praised the track, calling it a "surging mid-tempo with an electronic rock soundscape." They described Darren's voice as "croakingly soulful" including an occasional falsetto.

== Music video ==
The official music video was released on November 9, 2018. The visual features Mulligan performing the track with different people showing their struggles on their hands.

== Charts ==
Chart (2018)	Peak position
US Hot Christian Songs (Billboard)	5
US Christian Airplay (Billboard)	2
US Christian AC (Billboard)	4
US Christian AC Indicator (Billboard)	4

== Certifications ==
Certifications for Maybe It's Ok
Region	Certification	Certified units/sales
United States (RIAA)	Gold	500,000^{‡}
^{‡} Sales+streaming figures based on certification alone.
