= Apollo LTD =

- Origin: Nashville, Tennessee, U.S.
- Years active: 2015–present
- Labels: Residence, Centricity Music
- Members: Jordan Phillips; Adam Stark
- Website: weareapolloltd.com

Apollo LTD is a pop-rock duo from Nashville, Tennessee consisting of Jordan Phillips and Adam Stark. The band is signed to Residence Music, an imprint of Centricity Music.

== History ==
The two met in 2004 when they were paired as roommates at Nashville's Belmont University. They began writing and playing music while juggling assorted jobs including landscaping, swim coaching, and substitute teaching in the inner city school system. Apollo LTD's name was originally inspired by NASA. Phillips' uncle was an astronaut in the '90s which led to a fascination that still exists to this day. The Apollo program was birthed out of a desire to do something the United States had never done before as a country. When they started the band, the duo wanted to make music that they hadn't ever made prior. "It was our version of going to the moon in a tin can", Phillips explained.

Apollo LTD released their independent self-titled EP in 2015. It garnered critical acclaim from the likes of Consequence of Sound and The Atlantic and has received sync placements on Comedy Central, ESPN, FOX Sports, NBC, ABC, and more.

In August 2017, the band signed with Residence Music and released their first single "One in a Million". The track was later included on their 2018 Out of Body EP. Following the release of the EP, Apollo LTD released several additional singles in 2018 including "Gold", "One in a Million (DENM Remix)", and "On the Way Up". The band released their singles "Heaven (All Around You)" and "DNA" in early 2019.

The first single "One in a Million" merges sweeping synths, arena-ready guitars, and a hypnotic hook evocative of Achtung Baby-era U2 with a clever catchiness. "Big concerts have always captivated us. That is the starting point in anything we create; that energy is addicting and what we are drawn to as well as the great artists of our time who had something to say. The likes of Bob Dylan, Kendrick Lamar, and U2. We are influenced by everything. We have a hard drive of 36,000 gigs of various sounds to play around with when recording," says Adam.

"We want people to understand that we’re all experiencing many of the same things," Jordan leaves off. "Art and creation come from a place of introspection and self-awareness, but also a desire to serve. We want to create art to connect with people—to bring them together. A song can make you feel as if you belong. We know that feeling so well. Transcendent art creates empathy and inclusion. We’re all trying to figure out this 'being human' thing. We all wrestle with doubt and darkness, but there is joy to be found in our circumstances and immeasurable beauty that surrounds us every day."

Apollo LTD has been on apparent hiatus since mid-2024. Shortly after releasing a new album of music in April, the duo stopped posting to their social media outlets and no new songs have released.

== Band members ==
Current members

- Jordan Phillips
- Adam Stark

== Discography ==
Albums

Album	Details
Out of Body	Release Date: July 7, 2019; Label: Residence Music; Formats: CD, digital download
Nothing Is Ordinary. Everything Is Beautiful	Release Date: December 31, 2020; Label: Residence Music; Formats: CD, digital download
Hello Human	Release Date: April 19, 2024; Label: Residence Music; Formats: digital download

Extended plays

- Apollo LTD (2015)
- Out of Body (2018)
- Dreaming - EP (2024)

Singles

List of singles, with selected chart positions
Title	Year	Peak chart positions		Album
Title	Year	US Christ.	US Christ. Airplay	Album
"One in a Million"	2017	—	—	Out of Body
"Heaven"	2017	—	—	Out of Body
"Tired of LA"	2017	—	—	Out of Body
"Gold"	2018	28	22	Out of Body
"On the Way Up"	2018	38	23	Non-album single
"Heaven (All Around You)"	2019	—	—	Out of Body
"DNA"	2019	—	—	Out of Body
"On the Way Up 2.0"	2019	—	—	Out of Body
"Misfits"	2019	—	—	Out of Body
"You"	2020	38	29	Nothing Is Ordinary, Everything Is Beautiful
"Patient"	2020	31	24	Nothing Is Ordinary, Everything Is Beautiful
"Sunday Morning Feeling (feat. Ryan Stevenson)"	2021	23	18	Nothing Is Ordinary, Everything Is Beautiful
"This Christmas"	2022	—	29	Non-album single
"Soul Worth Saving"	2022	36	24	Hello Human
"Redemption Song"	2023	—	43	Hello Human
"Future's Calling"	2024	—	38	Hello Human
