= The War Is Over (Josh Baldwin album) =

Studio album by Josh Baldwin
- Released: May 26, 2017
- Recorded: 2016
- Genre: Worship; CCM; singer-songwriter; country
- Length: 52:48
- Label: Bethel Music
- Producer: Bobby Strand

Josh Baldwin chronology
Rivers (2014)	The War Is Over (2017)	Live at Church (2020)

Singles from The War Is Over
- 1. "Get Your Hopes Up" Released: May 26, 2017

The War Is Over is the third studio album by American Christian musician Josh Baldwin. The album was released on May 26, 2017, by Bethel Music, the album being his first solo release with the label. Bobby Strand produced the album.

== Background ==
After joining the Bethel Music collective in 2014, Josh Baldwin and his family moved from North Carolina to Redding, California, in August 2015. This cross-country move is cited as having influenced the album's creative direction due to the blending of sonic elements which reflect Baldwin's Southern origins and his placement in Bethel Music and Redding.

== Promotion ==
The earliest mention of The War Is Over dates as far back as March 2017 when announcements on Christian digital outlets Cross Rhythms and Louder Than The Music that the album will be released via Bethel Music on May 26.

On May 5, 2017, Bethel Music announced the pre-order of the album, having made three tracks and one music video available as pre-order singles prior to the album's release, the songs were "Get Your Hopes Up", "Endlessly" and "The War Is Over" and the music video of "Abraham". A press release to affirm the album's launch date as well as its full track listing via The Media Collective was issued on May 9, 2017.

To further promote the album, on May 19, 2017, a free exclusive stream of the album was made available on WorshipU, Bethel Music's online worship school, also prior to the album's release.

== Singles ==
"Get Your Hopes Up" was released on May 26, 2017, as the lead single from the album. The song impacted Christian radio on June 30, 2017.

== Critical reception ==
Professional ratings
Review scores
Source	Rating
CCM Magazine	4/5 stars
The Christian Beat	4.3/5 stars
Jay's Musik Blog	4.5/5
Louder Than The Music	4.5/5 stars
NewReleaseToday	4/5 stars
Today's Christian Entertainment	4/5 stars

Kevin Sparkman of CCM Magazine rated the album four stars out of five, saying that the songs are "the blend feels organic, and the album expectedly swells with the rich textures of electric guitars and strings we've come to love." Indicating in a four-point-three star review at The Christian Beat, Madeleine Dittmer states, "The War Is Over is all about the journey. Baldwin reminds listeners that they always walk with Christ in the unfamiliar territory they must cross. Rooted in scripture and rich personal experiences, the album is perfect for anyone who finds themselves needing some encouragement in a spiritual or physical journey." Christian music critic Jay Wright, in a review on his website, Jay's Musik Blog, also published on Louder Than The Music, rated the album four and a half out of five [stars], emphatically concluding "As a big fan of this kind of worship, I believe The War is Over is one of Bethel Music's finest releases to date!" NewReleaseToday's Kevin Davis bestowed the album a four star rating, saying "The War is Over is a completely worshipful album, loaded with biblical truth and sincere and soothing vocals. The album is sonically and lyrically refreshing. God is exalted and the depth of His love is celebrated in every single song. This is truly soul-nourishing worship." Kelly Meade, reviewing the album for Today's Christian Entertainment whilst rating it four stars, "The War is Over is a solid album that will be a welcome addition to your music library."

== Commercial performance ==
In the week ending June 1, 2017 saw the sale of 3,000 equivalent album units of The War Is Over, becoming Josh Baldwin's maiden appearance on Billboard's Christian Albums chart, peaking at No. 2.

== Track listing ==
The War Is Over – Standard edition
No.	Title	Writer(s)	Length
1.	"Get Your Hopes Up"	Josh Baldwin, Bobby Strand, Nate Moore, Tony Brown	4:37
2.	"Endlessly"	Baldwin, Strand, Joe Volk, Tom Crandall	4:33
3.	"You're My Home"	Baldwin, Strand, Volk	5:16
4.	"The War Is Over"	Strand, Baldwin	4:57
5.	"You Deserve It All"	Baldwin, Strand, Volk, Brown, Kalley Heiligenthal	6:02
6.	"Fountains"	Baldwin, Jonathan David Helser, Strand, Brown, Volk	5:37
7.	"Abraham"	Baldwin, Strand	6:30
8.	"Holding On"	Baldwin, Strand	3:26
9.	"Found in You"	Baldwin, Strand, Amanda Cook, Jacob Cook, Jenn Johnson, Volk	6:03
10.	"Peace"	Baldwin, Strand, Anthony Skinner	5:40
Total length:			52:48

iTunes bonus content
No.	Title	Length
11.	"Abraham" (Music Video)	6:42

== Charts ==
Chart (2017)	Peak position
Australian Digital Albums (ARIA)	41
UK Official Christian & Gospel Albums (OCC)	3
US Christian Albums (Billboard)	2
US Digital Albums (Billboard)	22
US Independent Albums (Billboard)	8
US Top Album Sales (Billboard)	65

== Release history ==
Region	Date	Version	Format	Label	Ref.
Worldwide	May 26, 2017	Standard	CD; Digital download; streaming	Bethel Music	
