= Rita Springer =

American Christian musician (born 1967)

- Born: California
- Origin: Southlake, Texas
- Genres: Worship; Christian pop
- Occupations: Singer; songwriter
- Instruments: Vocals; piano
- Years active: 1995–present
- Labels: Floodgate, E1 Music, Koch Records, Word Records, Found, Integrity Music, Gateway Records, and OUR RECORDS/The Fuel Music
- Website: ritaspringer.com

Rita Springer is an American Christian musician, who primarily performs a style of contemporary worship music and Christian pop music. She has released twelve studio albums, Love Covers (1995), All I Have (2000), Created to Worship (2001), Effortless (2002), Rise Up: Live Worship (2004), I Have to Believe (2005), Worth It All (2007), Beautiful You (2008), In This Forever (2011), The Playlist (2012), Battles (2017), Light (2020), and "Fed By Ravens" (2024).

== Early life ==
Springer was born in Riverside County, California, In CCM Magazine she said that during her childhood she and her family frequently moved.

== Career ==
Her recording career began in 1995 and the first studio album was Love Covers. She has also released ten more albums, All I Have in 2000 with Floodgate Records, Created to Worship in 2001 with E1 Music, Effortless in 2002 with Word Records, Rise Up: Live Worship in 2004 with Floodgate Records, I Have to Believe in 2005 with Found Records, Worth It All in 2007 with Koch Records, Beautiful You in 2008 with E1 Music, In This Forever in 2011 with Integrity Music, The Playlist in 2012 with Integrity Music, and Battles in 2017 with Gateway Records.

== Personal life ==
Springer is single and lives with her adopted son in Hurst, Texas west of Dallas.

== Discography ==
- Love Covers (1995, Independent)
- All I Have (2000, Floodgate Records)
- Created to Worship (2001, E1 Music)
- Effortless (2002, Word Records)
- Rise Up: Live Worship (2004, Floodgate)
- I Have to Believe (2005, Found)
- Worth It All (2007, Koch Records)
- Beautiful You (2008, E1 Music)
- In This Forever (2011, Integrity Records)
- The Playlist (2012, Integrity)
- Battles (2017, Gateway)
- Fed By Ravens (2024, OUR RECORDS/The Fuel Music)
