= Hillsong Worship discography =

- EPs: 4
- Live albums: 26
- Compilation albums: 3
- Singles: 19
- Music videos: 8
- Other album appearances: 1

The discography of Australian Christian music praise & worship group Hillsong Worship consists of twenty-six live albums, four extended plays (EPs), three compilation albums, and 19 singles.

== Discography ==
=== Studio albums ===
List of selected albums, with selected chart positions
Title	Album details	Peak chart positions		
Title	Album details	AUS	US	US Christ.
Spirit and Truth	Released: 1988; Formats:	—	—	—
Show Your Glory	Released: 1990; Formats:	—	—	—
The Peace Project	Released: 22 October 2017; Formats: CD, digital download	18	122	2
Hay Más (Hillsong En Español: Hay Más)	Released: 16 August 2019; There Is More in Spanish; Formats: CD, digital download	—	—	—
Awake	Released: 11 October 2019; Formats: CD, digital download	3	39	1
"—" denotes a recording that did not chart or was not released in that territory.

=== Live albums ===
List of selected albums, with selected chart positions
Title	Album details	Peak chart positions					Certifications
Title	Album details	AUS	CAN	US	US Christ.	UK	Certifications
The Power of Your Love	Released: 1992; Formats:	—	—	—	—	—	
Stone's Been Rolled Away	Released: 1993; Formats:	—	—	—	—	—	
People Just Like Us	Released: 1994; Formats:	—	—	—	—	—	
Friends in High Places	Released: 1995; Formats:	—	—	—	—	—	
God Is in the House	Released: 1996; Formats:	—	—	—	—	—	
All Things Are Possible	Released: 1997; Formats:	—	—	—	—	—	
Touching Heaven Changing Earth	Released: 1998; Formats:	—	—	—	31	—	
By Your Side	Released: 1999; Formats:	—	—	—	—	—	
For This Cause	Released: 2000; Formats:	—	—	—	—	—	
You Are My World	Released: 2001; Formats:	—	—	—	—	—	
Blessed	Released: 2002; Formats:	4	—	—	—	—	
Hope	Released: 2003; Formats:	3	—	—	—	—	
For All You've Done	Released: 4 July 2004; Formats: CD, digital download	1	—	—	11	—	
God He Reigns	Released: 3 July 2005; Formats: CD, digital download	2	—	—	11	—	
Mighty to Save	Released: 2 July 2006; Formats: CD, digital download	25	—	—	18	—	
Saviour King	Released: 1 July 2007; Formats: CD, digital download	6	—	114	5	—	
This Is Our God	Released: 5 July 2008; Formats: CD, digital download	2	—	55	2	—	
Faith + Hope + Love	Released: 4 August 2009; Formats: CD, digital download	12	—	47	2	—	
A Beautiful Exchange	Released: 29 June 2010; Formats: CD, digital download	3	—	40	1	—	
God Is Able (LP)	Released: 5 July 2011; Formats: CD, digital download	3	—	35	1	—	
Cornerstone (LP)	Released: 3 July 2012; Formats: CD, digital download	2	—	32	1	99	
Glorious Ruins	Released: 2 July 2013; Formats: CD, digital download	3	23	18	2	73	
No Other Name	Released: 27 June 2014; Formats: CD, digital download	2	24	13	1	53	
Open Heaven / River Wild	Released: 16 October 2015; Formats: CD, digital download	1	37	25	1	39	
Let There Be Light	Released: 14 October 2016; Formats: CD, digital download	2	24	14	1	36	RIAA: Gold
There Is More	Released: 6 April 2018; Formats: CD, digital download	2	40	26	2	42	
These Same Skies	Released: 5 November 2021; Formats: digital download, CD (December 3)	—	—	—	15	—	
"—" denotes a recording that did not chart or was not released in that territory.

=== Extended plays ===
- God Is Able (EP) (2011)
- Cornerstone (EP) (2012)
- O Praise the Name (Anástasis) (2015)
- What a Beautiful Name (2017)
- There Is More: Studio Sessions (2018)
- At Easter (2021)
- Great I Am (2025)

=== Christmas Albums ===
- Christmas (2001)
- Celebrating Christmas (2005)
- Born is the King (2011)

=== Instrumental Albums ===
- The Secret Place (1999)
- Foever (2003)

=== Worship Series ===
- Simply Worship (1996)
- Simply Worship 2 - Shadow of your wings (1997)
- Simply Worship 3 - You shine (1998)
- Overwhelmed (2000)
- Amazing Love (2003)
- Faithful (2004)
- Songs for Communion (2005)

=== Compilation albums ===
- Hills Praise (1997)
- Shout to the Lord: The Platinum Collection (2000)
- Shout to the Lord 2: The Platinum Collection, Vol. 2 (2003)
- Ultimate Worship - Volume 1 (2005)
- Ultimate Worship - Volume 2 (2008)
- God Is Able (worktapes) (2011)

=== Children's albums ===
- Jesus Is My Superhero (2004)
- Super Strong God (2005)
- Supernatural (2006)
- Tell The World (2007)
- Follow You (2008)
- Ultimate Collection (2009)
- Crazy Noise (2012)
- Can You Believe It? (2018)
- Songs Of Some Silliness (2019)
- Never Walk Alone

== Singles ==
Year	Song	Peak positions						Certifications	Album
Year	Song	NZ Hot	US Bub.	US Christ. Songs	US Christ. Airplay	US Christ. Digital	US Christ. Stream	Certifications	Album
1994	"Shout to the Lord"	—	—	—		—	—		People Just Like Us
2006	"Mighty to Save"	—	—	—		24	11		Mighty to Save
2010	"Forever Reign"	—	—	—		39	—		A Beautiful Exchange
2011	"It Is Well with My Soul"	—	—	—		46	—		Non-album single
2012	"Cornerstone"	—	—	21		14	—	RIAA: Gold; RMNZ: Gold	Cornerstone
2013	"Man of Sorrows"	—	—	47	—	—	—		Glorious Ruins
2014	"Calvary"	—	—	—	—	—	—		No Other Name
2014	"No Other Name"	—	—	29	30	18	—		No Other Name
2015	"This I Believe (The Creed)"	—	—	31	38	9	—	RIAA: Gold; RMNZ: Gold	No Other Name
2015	"One Thing"	—	—	—	—	34	—		Open Heaven / River Wild
2016	"Grace to Grace"	—	—	24	—	8	—		Let There Be Light
2016	"O Praise the Name (Anástasis)"	—	—	39	—	—	—	RMNZ: Gold	Open Heaven / River Wild
2017	"What a Beautiful Name"	—	7	1	1	1	2	BPI: Silver; RIAA: Platinum; RMNZ: 2× Platinum	Let There Be Light
2017	"Seasons"	—	—	30	41	—	—		The Peace Project
2018	"Who You Say I Am"	—	25	2	1	2	5	BPI: Silver; RIAA: Gold (Studio Version); RIAA: Gold (Live); RMNZ: Platinum	There Is More
2019	"King of Kings"	29	—	12	17	7	19	RIAA: Gold; RMNZ: Gold	Awake
2019	"Hermoso Nombre"	—	—	—	—	—	—		Hay Más
2020	"Awake My Soul"	27	—	29	23	21	—		Awake
2021	"Fresh Wind"	20	—	23	—	12	—		Non-album single
2021	"Hope of the Ages" (with Reuben Morgan and Cody Carnes)	—	—	49	—	—	—		These Same Skies

=== Promotional singles ===
Year	Song	Peak positions	Album
Year	Song	US Christ. Songs	Album
2019	"No One But You"	23	Awake

== Other charted songs ==
Year	Song	Peak positions					Certifications	Album
Year	Song	NZ Hot	US Christ	US Christ. Airplay	US Christ. Digital	US Christ. Stream	Certifications	Album
2010	"From the Inside Out"	—	—		49	—		Mighty to Save
2011	"God Is Able (Live)"	—	—		5	—		God Is Able
2011	"We Three Kings"	—	36		—	—		Born Is the King EP
2011	"Hosanna"	—	—		30	—		Savior King
2011	"With Us (Live)"	—	—		35	—		God Is Able
2011	"Rise (Live)"	—	—		30	—		God Is Able
2012	"Born Is the King (It's Christmas)"	—	18		—	—		We Have a Savior
2012	"We Have a Savior"	—	48		—	—		We Have a Savior
2012	"I Surrender"	—	—		40	11	RIAA: Gold; RMNZ: Gold	Cornerstone
2013	"Christ Is Enough (Live)"	—	—	—	23	—		Glorious Ruins
2013	"Glorious Ruins (Live)"	—	—	—	34	—		Glorious Ruins
2014	"Peace Has Come"	—	27	26	—	—		non-album single
2015	"Broken Vessels (Amazing Grace)"	—	28	—	17	—	RIAA: Gold; RMNZ: Gold	No Other Name
2015	"Open Heaven (River Wild)"	—	25	—	24	—		Open Heaven / River Wild
2016	"Transfiguration"	—	35	—	—	—		Open Heaven / River Wild
2016	"Behold (Then My Soul Sings)"	—	29	—	17	—		Let There Be Light
2016	"In Control"	—	39	—	—	—		Let There Be Light
2016	"Let There Be Light"	—	41	—	—	—		Let There Be Light
2016	"Love So Great"	—	42	—	—	—		Let There Be Light
2016	"Elohim"	—	45	—	—	—		Let There Be Light
2017	"Jesus I Need You"	—	32	—	—	—		Open Heaven / River Wild
2018	"Prince of Heaven"	—	22	15	—	—		The Peace Project
2018	"Joy to the World"	—	31	25	—	—		The Peace Project
2018	"When I Think Upon Christmas"	—	39	31	—	—		The Peace Project
2018	"So Will I (100 Billion X)"	—	17	—	—	15		There Is More
2018	"New Wine"	—	17	—	24	23	RMNZ: Gold	There Is More
2018	"Remembrance"	—	27	—	—	—		There Is More
2018	"The Passion"	—	29	—	—	—		There Is More
2018	"God So Loved"	—	39	—	—	—		There Is More
2018	"Touch of Heaven"	—	27	—	—	—		There Is More
2018	"Be Still"	—	32	—	—	—		There Is More
2018	"You Are Life"	—	44	—	—	—		There Is More
2019	"Dawn"	39	40	—	—	—		Awake
2019	"Come Alive"	35	34	—	—	—		Awake
2019	"See the Light"	34	24	—	—	—		Awake
2019	"Upper Room"	—	37	—	—	—		Awake
2019	"Every Breath"	—	41	—	—	—		Awake
2021	"Agnus Dei" / "King of Kings" (with Passion, Chidima, Jenn Johnson and Brooke Ligertwood)	—	50	—	—	—		At Easter (EP)
