= Ultimate Worship =

Compilation album by Hillsong Church
- Released: 2005
- Recorded: Various
- Genre: Contemporary worship music
- Length: 77:58
- Label: Hillsong Music Australia
- Producer: Darlene Zschech and the Hillsong team

Hillsong Music Australia Compilation albums chronology
The Platinum Collection Volume 2: Shout to the Lord 2 (2003)	Ultimate Worship (2005)

Ultimate Worship is a compilation praise and worship album of contemporary worship music by the Hillsong Church. The album appeared on the Billboard Top Heatseekers and reached No. 19 on the Top Christian Albums Chart.

== Album details ==
This album is a compilation of songs from previous Hillsong Music albums, including the live praise and worship albums, Hillsong United series, Hillsong London album Shout God's Fame and Shout to the Lord from Darlene Zschech's solo album, Kiss of Heaven. Several of the songs have been edited to make the tracks shorter than the original in order to fit them on the disc.

== Track listing ==
1. "One Way" (Jonathon Douglass & Joel Houston; from For All You've Done)
2. "My Redeemer Lives" (Reuben Morgan; from By Your Side)
3. "Glory" (Morgan; from Hope)
4. "Made Me Glad" (Miriam Webster; from Blessed)
5. "The Potter’s Hand" (Darlene Zschech; from Touching Heaven Changing Earth)
6. "Shout Your Fame" (Jonas Myrin, Natasha Bedingfield, Gio Galanti & Paul Nevison; from Shout God's Fame)
7. "Better Than Life" (Marty Sampson; from Hope)
8. "Here I Am to Worship" (Tim Hughes; from Hope)
9. "All for Love" (Mia Fieldes; from Look to You)
10. "I Give You My Heart" (Holly Dawson; from UP: Unified Praise)
11. "Everyday" (Houston; from UP: Unified Praise)
12. "Now That You’re Near" (Sampson; from To the Ends of the Earth)
13. "Still" (Morgan; from Hope)
14. "All the Heavens" (Morgan; from Blessed)
15. "Highest" (Morgan; from Hope)
16. "Worthy Is the Lamb" (Zschech; from UP: Unified Praise)
17. "Shout to the Lord" (Zschech; from Kiss of Heaven)
