= Hillsong Worship =

Australian praise and worship group

- Also known as: Hillsong; Hillsong Live (until 2014)
- Origin: Sydney, Australia
- Genre: Praise and worship
- Years active: 1983–present
- Website: hillsong.com/worship

Hillsong Worship (formerly Hillsong Live) is a praise and worship collective from Sydney, Australia. They started making music in 1983 at Hillsong Church. Fifteen of their songs have appeared on the Billboard magazine charts in the US, with "What a Beautiful Name" (2016) representing their greatest success, reaching platinum in the US. The band consists of a collection of worship leaders and musicians from the global Hillsong Church.

== Background ==
The group was formed in 1983 in Sydney, Australia, where they were located at Hillsong Church, while now they are spread across the globe. The group was called Hillsong Live until June 2014, when they took the name Hillsong Worship.

== History ==
Hillsong Worship released its first album, Spirit and Truth, in 1988. In 1996, Shout to the Lord was their first album in partnership with Integrity Music as part of the Hosanna! Music series.

All of the group's albums since 2004 have charted in Australia, and two albums, For All You've Done and Open Heaven / River Wild, have reached number one on the Australian ARIA Albums Chart. The group has also seen twelve albums chart on the Billboard magazine charts, where there have been placements on the Christian Albums and the Heatseekers Albums charts (those were For All You've Done, God He Reigns, and Mighty to Save). Their albums Saviour King, This Is Our God, Faith + Hope + Love, A Beautiful Exchange, God Is Able, Cornerstone, Glorious Ruins, No Other Name, and Open Heaven / River Wild have charted on the Billboard 200 and Christian Albums charts.

In 2018, Hillsong Worship won the Grammy Award for Best Contemporary Christian Music Performance/Song with "What a Beautiful Name".

Over the years, their albums have been recorded by the labels Hillsong Music, Sony Music, Integrity Music, Epic Records, Columbia Records, and Sparrow Records.

=== Michael Guglielmucci cancer scandal ===
It was reported in 2008 that Michael Guglielmucci, pastor of the church and former bass player in the Planetshakers band, had fraudulently claimed he was dying of cancer. He wrote "Healer", a song of encouragement for believers who were suffering from cancer, for the album Saviour of the World, which was released in June 2007. Guglielmucci performed the song regularly over a two-year period, often with an oxygen tube attached to his nose, and during this time received money from supporters who believed his illness was real.

Guglielmucci later explained his actions as being a result of a long-term pornography addiction. The track had also been added to the Hillsong album This Is Our God (2008), but later removed from the album. Representatives of churches with which Guglielmucci had affiliations told the press they were totally unaware of this situation. In an email sent to Hillsong members, the church's general manager, George Aghajanian, said the news was even a shock to Guglielmucci's own family and that the suspended pastor was seeking professional help. Guglielmucci was stripped of all credentials by the Australian Christian Churches, who promised that all money donated by listeners inspired by the song would be returned or donated to charity and Guglielmucci's bank accounts would be audited to determine the amount of funds raised.

Michael is the son of Danny Guglielmucci, co-founder of Edge Church International, located in the southern Adelaide suburb of Reynella, also a Pentecostal church and a member of the Australian Christian Churches (formerly Assemblies of God in Australia) network.

== Notable past members ==
The following have sung as notable members of Hillsong Worship:

- Darlene Zschech
- Geoff Bullock
- Marty Sampson
- Brooke Ligertwood
- Joel Houston
- Reuben Morgan
- Tarryn Stokes
- Ben Fielding
- Taya Smith

== Discography ==
- Spirit and Truth (1988)
- Show Your Glory (1990)
- The Power of Your Love (1992)
- Stone's Been Rolled Away (1993)
- People Just Like Us (1994)
- Friends in High Places (1995)
- God Is in the House (1996)
- All Things Are Possible (1997)
- Touching Heaven Changing Earth (1998)
- By Your Side (1999)
- For This Cause (2000)
- You Are My World (2001)
- Blessed (2002)
- Hope (2003)
- For All You've Done (2004)
- God He Reigns (2005)
- Mighty to Save (2006)
- Saviour King (2007)
- This Is Our God (2008)
- Faith + Hope + Love (2009)
- A Beautiful Exchange (2010)
- God Is Able (2011)
- Cornerstone (2012)
- Glorious Ruins (2013)
- No Other Name (2014)
- Open Heaven / River Wild (2015)
- Let There Be Light (2016)
- The Peace Project (2017)
- There Is More (2018)
- Awake (2019)
- Take Heart (Again) (2020)
- These Same Skies (2021)
- Team Night (2022)
- Holy is the Name (2027)

== Awards ==
The group has received one Grammy Award and nine Dove Awards.

=== Billboard Music Awards ===
Year	Nominee / work	Award	Result
2019	Hillsong Worship	Top Christian Artist	Nominated
2019	There is More	Top Christian Album	Nominated
2019	"Who You Say I Am"	Top Christian Song	Nominated

=== GMA Dove Awards ===
Year	Nominee / work	Award	Result
2017	"What a Beautiful Name"	Song of the Year	Won
2017	"What a Beautiful Name"	Worship Song of the Year	Won
2017	Let There Be Light	Worship Album of the Year	Nominated
2017	Let There Be Light	Long Form Video of the Year	Nominated
2019	"Who You Say I Am"	Song of the Year	Nominated
2019	"Who You Say I Am"	Worship Song of the Year	Won
2019	"Who You Say I Am (Studio Version)"	Worship Recorded Song of the Year	Nominated
2020	Hillsong Worship	Artist of the Year	Nominated
2020	"King of Kings"	Song of the Year	Nominated
2020	"King of Kings (Live at Qudos Bank Arena, Sydney, AU 2019)"	Worship Song of the Year	Nominated
2020	Awake	Worship Album of the Year	Won
2020	Awake (Live)	Long Form Video of the Year	Won
