= Mighty to Save =

Mighty to Save may refer to:

- Mighty to Save (Hillsong album), 2006
  - "Mighty to Save" (song), title song from above same-titled Hillsong album
- Mighty to Save (Neal Morse album), 2010
