= By Your Side (Hillsong album) =

Live album by Hillsong Church
- Released: 4 July 1999
- Recorded: 7 March 1999
- Venue: Hills Christian Life Centre, Sydney, Australia
- Genre: Praise & Worship
- Length: 73:50
- Label: Hillsong Music Australia
- Producer: Russell Fragar and Darlene Zschech

Hillsong Music Australia Live praise & worship chronology
| Touching Heaven Changing Earth (1998) | By Your Side (1999) | For This Cause (2000) |

By Your Side is the eighth album in the live praise and worship series of contemporary worship music by Hillsong Church. It was recorded live at the Hills Christian Life Centre building (now known as the Hillsong Church Hub auditorium) by Darlene Zschech and the Hillsong team. The album reached No. 21 on the Billboard Top Contemporary Christian Albums Chart.

== Album design ==
By Your Side cover artwork features the title using the font Trajan Pro. The title uses different versions and weights of the font. This album cover shows images of Darlene Zschech and is also the first to show Reuben Morgan on the cover (he appears five times more on For This Cause, Blessed, Hope, For All You've Done, Mighty to Save, and A Beautiful Exchange as well as the back cover of Saviour King).

The majority of the songs were written by Reuben Morgan & Darlene Zschech

Marty Sampson, Russell Fragar, Raymond Badham, Miriam Webster, Luke Munns & Aran Puddle contributed to songs also.

This is the first official Hillsong Live Album to feature songs contributed from Hillsong United. "My Redeemer Lives" and "Your Unfailling Love" were also on the Hillsong United album "One".

== Track listing ==
1. "My Redeemer Lives" (Reuben Morgan) — 04:09 worship leader: Darlene Zschech b. Reuben Morgan
2. "Great In Power" (Russell Fragar) — 03:25 worship leader: Darlene Zschech
3. "I Feel Like I'm Falling" (Raymond Badham) — 05:29 worship leaders: Mark Stevens & Darlene Zschech
4. "Your Unfailing Love" (Reuben Morgan) — 06:28 worship leader: Darlene Zschech b. Reuben Morgan
5. "Dwelling Places" (Miriam Webster) — 05:06 worship leaders: Darlene Zschech And Miriam Webster
6. "What The Lord Has Done In Me" (Reuben Morgan) — 05:00 worship leader: Miriam Webster
7. "Sing Of Your Great Love" (Darlene Zschech) — 08:26 worship leader: Darlene Zschech b. Steve McPherson
8. "By Your Side" (Marty Sampson) — 04:48 worship leader: Marty Sampson
9. "In Freedom" (Aran Puddle) — 03:27 worship leaders: Darlene Zschech And Marty Sampson
10. "You Said" (Reuben Morgan) — 04:34 worship leader: Darlene Zschech
11. "Stay" (Luke Munns) — 08:28 worship leader: Darlene Zschech
12. "Eagle's Wings" (Reuben Morgan) — 06:30 worship leader: Mark Stevens & Darlene Zschech
13. "Free To Dance" (Darlene Zschech) — 04:16 worship leaders: Lisa Young & Darlene Zschech
14. "This Is How We Overcome" (Reuben Morgan) — 03:49 worship leader: Darlene Zschech
- b. = lead backing vocal
