= Songs for Communion =

Studio album by Hillsong Church
- Released: 21 March 2006
- Genre: Praise & Worship
- Length: 65:57
- Label: Hillsong Music Australia
- Producer: Peter King

Hillsong Music Australia Worship Series chronology
Faithful (2003)	Songs for Communion (2006)

Songs for Communion is an album of Praise & Worship by Hillsong Church designed to be used in communion.

== Reception ==
Professional ratings
Review scores
Source	Rating
CCM Magazine	8/10 stars
Christianity Today	3/5 stars
Cross Rhythms	8/10 stars

In June 2006 Tony Cummings of Cross Rhythms rated the album as 8 out of 10 and declared it composed "almost entirely of mid tempo and slow songs and with arrangements that are low key and reverential perfectly suited to music associated with the Lord's Supper". Also that month CCM Magazine rated it as 8 out of 10 and advised listeners to "relax and close your eyes, and let the waves of prayerful reverence wash your spirit clean".

== Track listing ==
No.	Title	Writer(s)	Length
1.	"Nothing but the Blood"	Robert Lowry	4:36
2.	"My Hope Is Jesus"	Adrian Lewis	4:11
3.	"The Only Name"	Darlene Zschech & Miriam Webster	6:05
4.	"Gift of Love"	Amanda Fergusson	4:08
5.	"Saviour"	Darlene Zschech	4:56
6.	"Life"	Peter James	4:33
7.	"With Christ"	Mia Fieldes	4:40
8.	"I Will Love"	Miriam Webster	4:24
9.	"Oh the Blood"	Darlene Zschech	4:24
10.	"Scarlet Hands"	Aaron Watson & Mia Fieldes	5:52
11.	"Worthy Is the Lamb"	Darlene Zschech	5:33
12.	"Redeeming King"	Scott Hopkins & Miriam Webster	2:52
13.	"What the Lord Has Done in Me"	Reuben Morgan	5:19
14.	"How Can You Refuse Him Now?"	Hank Williams	4:09

== Credits ==
=== Band ===
Lead Vocals:

- Darlene Zschech ("The Only Name", "Saviour")
- Miriam Webster ("The Only Name", "I Will Love")
- Steve McPherson ("My Hope Is Jesus", "What The Lord Has Done In Me")
- Julie Cowdroy ("Nothing But The Blood")
- Annie Garratt ("Gift Of Love")
- Holly Watson ("With Christ", "Scarlet Hands")
- Marcus Temu ("Life")
- Paul Andrew ("Worthy Is The Lamb")
- Erica Crocker ("Oh The Blood")
- Katrina Tadman ("Redeeming King")
- Brooke Fraser ("How Can You Refuse Him Now?")

Backing Vocals:

- Julie Bassett
- Steve McPherson
- Barry Southgate
- Katrina Tadman

Piano/Hammond/Rhodes Piano/Keyboards/Bass Guitar:

- Peter King

Add. Piano and Keyboards:

- Nic Manders
- Christine Kinsley

Guitars:

- Nigel Hendroff
- Andrew Tennikoff
- Timon Klein
- Jeremy Barnes
- David Holmes
- Nic Manders

Drums:

- Rolf Wam Fjell
- Mitch Farmer
- Dane Charles

Percussion:

- Nic Manders
- Peter King

Violins:

- Oliver McMullen

Vocal Arrangers & Producers:

- Peter King
- Julie Bassett

=== Production Team ===
- Executive Producer: Darlene Zschech
- Producer: Peter King
- Project Manager: Tim Whincop
- Mixed at: The Grove Studios by Nic Manders, assisted by Josh Telford. ("Redeeming King" & "How Could I..." mixed by Peter King)
- Recorded at: The Grove Studios, 11th Hour Studios, Hillsong Studios & Kingtone
- Recording Engineers: Trevor Beck, James Rudder, Peter King & Nic Manders
- Assistant Engineer: Josh Telford
- Additional Post-Production: Peter King
- Mastered at: 301 Studios (Sydney) by Steve Smart
- Art Direction: Josh Bonett, Michelle Fragar & Dan Codyre
- Design: Cameron Booth at Vein Media
- Photography: davidanderson.com.au and Natalie Beaton
