= Con Todo =

Studio album by Hillsong
- Released: 8 June 2010
- Recorded: 2009
- Genre: Contemporary worship, Latin
- Length: 78:28
- Label: Hillsong Music Australia
- Producer: Darlene Zschech, Reuben Morgan, Joel Houston

Hillsong chronology
Unidos Permanecemos (2006)	Con Todo (2010)	En Mi Lugar (2011)

Con Todo is a worship album of Christian contemporary music by Hillsong Church in Spanish that was released on 8 June 2010. The album includes a selection of 14 songs by Hillsong translated and recorded in Spanish featuring Darlene Zschech, Reuben Morgan and other members of the Hillsong Worship Team. The album won the award for Spanish Language Album of the Year at the 42nd GMA Dove Awards.

== Track listing ==
	Song	English translation	Songwriter(s)	Worship leader(s)	Supporting vocal(s)	Length
01	"Para Exaltarte"	"Your Name High"	Joel Houston	Joel Houston	None	04:03
02	"Correré"	"Run"	Joel Houston	Toni Romero	None	03:23
03	"Hosanna"	"Hosanna"	Brooke Fraser	Darlene Zschech	None	06:09
04	"Desde Mi Interior"	"From The Inside Out"	Joel Houston	Jad Gillies	None	06:14
05	"Canción Del Desierto"	"Desert Song"	Brooke Fraser	Annie Garratt	None	04:17
06	"En La Cruz"	"At The Cross"	Darlene Zschech, Reuben Morgan	Darlene Zschech	None	06:21
07	"Rey Salvador"	"Saviour King"	Marty Sampson, Mia Fieldes	Dave Ware	None	08:03
08	"Poderoso Para Salvar"	"Mighty To Save"	Reuben Morgan, Ben Fielding	Reuben Morgan	Darlene Zschech	05:35
09	"Soy Libre"	"Break Free"	Joel Houston, Matt Crocker, Scott Ligertwood	Matt Crocker	None	04:00
10	"Poderoso"	"Stronger"	Reuben Morgan, Ben Fielding	Jad Gillies	Darlene Zschech	04:38
11	"Sólo Cristo"	"None But Jesus"	Brooke Fraser	Brooke Fraser	None	07:08
12	"Es Nuestro Dios"	"This Is Our God"	Reuben Morgan	Reuben Morgan, Darlene Zschech	None	06:11
13	"Eres Mi Fortaleza"	"You Are My Strength"	Reuben Morgan	Reuben Morgan	None	04:54
14	"Con Todo"	"With Everything"	Joel Houston	Joel Houston	Darlene Zschech	07:35

== Production and recording ==
Each song includes the original instrumental recording of each song with the lead and backing vocals re-recorded in Spanish.

== Release ==
A free download was made of both "Hosanna" and "Para Exaltarte" (the Spanish version of "Your Name High") on Hillsong's website by subscribing to their Spanish newsletter. The album is charted #29 on the Top Latin Albums and #4 on the Latin Pop Albums chart. Two years later, the album remains in the iTunes Latin charts.
