= David Ware (disambiguation) =

David Ware may refer to:

- David Ware, Australian Christian musician, member of Hillsong Worship and worship leader at the Hillsong Church in Sydney
- David S. Ware (1949–2012) American jazz saxophonist
