= Cornerstone EP =

EP (Live) by Hillsong Church
- Released: 18 May 2012 (Australia)
- Recorded: 30 October 2011
- Genre: Contemporary worship music
- Length: 18:01
- Label: Hillsong Music Australia

Hillsong Music Australia Live praise & worship chronology
God Is Able (2011)	Cornerstone EP (2012)	' Cornerstone ' (2012)

Cornerstone EP is a live EP by Hillsong Church and was released in May 2012.

The album includes two songs in two different versions, live and studio.

== Track listing ==
#	Song	Author	Worship Leader	Backing Vocal	Length
1	Cornerstone (Studio Version)	Edward Mote, Eric Liljero, Jonas Myrin, & Reuben Morgan	Dave Ware		3:26
2	Hope of the World (Studio Version)	Reuben Morgan, Jason Ingram, & Matthew Bronleewee	Ben Fielding		3:38
3	Cornerstone (Live)	Edward Mote, Eric Liljero, Jonas Myrin, & Reuben Morgan	Dave Ware	Annie Garratt	6:49
4	Hope of the World (Live)	Reuben Morgan, Jason Ingram, & Matthew Bronleewee	Reuben Morgan	Annie Garratt	4:08
