= Unidos Permanecemos =

Live album by Hillsong & Hillsong United
- Released: 2007
- Recorded: 2006
- Genre: Praise and worship, Christian rock, Latin
- Length: 76:55
- Label: Hillsong Music Australia
- Producer: Joel Houston

Hillsong Español chronology
Unidos Permanecemos (2007)	Con Todo (2010)

Unidos Permanecemos (Spanish for "United We Stand") is a live album by Australian band Hillsong United. It was recorded in Spain and sung in Spanish. AllMusic gave the album a four star rating out of five, writing that "The fact that the Aussies took the time to learn the lyrics and enunciate them correctly is proof that they didn't just want to rush out something to appease their ardent Latin followers; they wanted them to give the full Hillsong United treatment: big choruses, stadium-sized rockers, and lots of Britpop atmospherics ... en español."

== Track listing ==
- Introducción (An Introduction) — (Michael Guy Chislett) — 01:33
- Es Tiempo (The Time Has Come) — (Joel Houston) Worship Leader: Joel Houston — 04:41
- Tómalo (Take It All) — (Marty Sampson, Matt Crocker & Scott Ligertwood) Worship Leader: Marty Sampson — 03:09
- Su Hijo Dio (From God Above) — (Marty Sampson) Worship Leader: Marty Sampson — 03:19
- Desde Mi Interior (From The Inside Out) — (Joel Houston) Worship Leader: Jad Gillies — 06:30
- Me Viniste A Rescatar (Came To My Rescue) — (Sampson, Dylan Thomas & Joel Davies) Worship Leader: Marty Sampson & Annie Garrat — 05:23
- Repetición (A Reprise) — 02:53
- Sólo Cristo (None But Jesus) — (Brooke Fraser) Worship Leader: Brooke Fraser — 05:30
- Selah I — 01:43
- Fuego De Dios (Fire Fall Down) — (Crocker) Worship Leader: Marty Sampson — 10:51
- La Revolución (Revolution) — (Ligertwood, Houston, Sampson, Chislett & Fraser) Worship Leader: JD — 03:47
- Venga Tú Reino (Kingdom Come) — (Ben Fielding) Worship Leader: Jad Gillies — 04:59
- Nadie Hay Como Tú (There Is No One Like You) — (Joel Houston) Worship Leader: Joel Houston — 02:38
- Soberano (Sovereign Hands) — (Mia Fieldes) Worship Leader: Annie Garrat — 05:30
- Aquí Estoy (The Stand) — (Joel Houston) Worship Leader: Joel Houston — 06:54
- Selah II — 03:40
- Aleluya (Hallelujah) — (Rolf Wam Rjell, Matthew Tennikoff & Marty Sampson) Worship Leader: Joel Houston — 03:46
