= Faith + Hope + Love =

Live album by Hillsong Worship
- Released: July 2009
- Recorded: 01, 08 and 29 March 2009
- Venue: Hillsong Convention Centre, Hillsong City Campus, Sydney Entertainment Centre, Sydney, Australia
- Genre: Contemporary Worship
- Length: 75:10
- Label: Hillsong
- Producer: Reuben Morgan, Joel Houston

Hillsong Music Australia Live praise & worship chronology
This Is Our God (2008)	Faith + Hope + Love (2009)	A Beautiful Exchange (2010)

Professional ratings
Review scores
Source	Rating
AllMusic	3/5 stars

Faith + Hope + Love is the eighteenth album in the live praise and worship series of Christian Contemporary music by Hillsong Church. It was recorded live on 1 March 2009 at Hillsong Convention Centre, on 8 March 2009 at Hilsong City Campus and on 29 March 2009 at the Sydney Entertainment Centre on . The recording team was composed by the Hillsong Live Worship team led by Reuben Morgan, Darlene Zschech and Joel Houston. One of the most acclaimed songs on the album is "It's Your Love" sung by Darlene Zschech.

== Album information ==
Joel Houston stated, "Beyond the sound, the rhythm, the art... beyond the strings, the keys, the melodies... beyond the stage, the set, the lights... are the people. Ordinary men, women & children, from all walks of life, in all sorts of circumstances and each one with a unique story to tell. This is the Church... and this is Hillsong's 18th live praise and worship album 'faith+hope+love'. Everyone together playing their part and lending their voice to the collective story, our story. The prayer is that 'Faith+Hope+Love' will breathe the light, love and freedom of Christ into your life, and continue to give expression to what God is doing in and through people all over the Earth."

The songs "You Hold Me Now" and "No Reason to Hide" are also featured on the later Hillsong United album Across the Earth: Tear Down the Walls, released May 2009.

This is the first Hillsong Live album that does not feature worship leader Marty Sampson since "Touching Heaven Changing Earth" in 1998. It is also the first Hillsong Live album not to take its name from one of its songs.

This album was released in Spain 28 July 2009.

The majority of the songs were written by Reuben Morgan, Joel Houston, Matt Crocker, and Marty Sampson.

Brooke Fraser, Jad Gillies, Mia Fieldes, Jonathon Douglass, Jill McCloghry, Sam Knock, Robert Fergusson, Leeland Mooring, Jack Mooring, and Darlene Zschech contributed songs also.

== Track listing (CD) ==
Track No.	Song	Songwriter	Worship Leader	Supporting Vocal	Duration
01	The First And The Last (Recorded On 29 March 2009 At Sydney Entertainment Centre)	Reuben Morgan, Joel Houston	Joel Houston		05:01
02	For Your Name (Recorded On 29 March 2009 At Sydney Entertainment Centre)	Jad Gillies, Joel Houston, Reuben Morgan	Jad Gillies		03:56
03	Glow (Recorded On 29 March 2009 At Sydney Entertainment Centre)	Joel Houston, Matt Crocker	David Ware		04:57
04	It's Your Love (Recorded On 29 March 2009 At Sydney Entertainment Centre)	Mia Fieldes	Darlene Zschech		08:32
05	I Will Exalt You (Recorded On 1 March 2009 At Hillsong Convention Centre)	Brooke Fraser	Brooke Fraser-Ligertwood		07:41
06	Yahweh (Recorded On 1 March 2009 At Hillsong Convention Centre)	Reuben Morgan	David Ware	Darlene Zschech	07:17
07	No Reason To Hide (Recorded On 1 March 2009 At Hillsong Convention Centre)	Matt Crocker, Joel Houston	Joel Houston	None	03:43
08	God One And Only (Recorded On 1 March 2009 At Hillsong Convention Centre)	Jonathon Douglass, Sam Knock	Jonathon Douglass		03:30
09	The Wonder Of Your Love (Recorded On 29 March 2009 At Sydney Entertainment Centre)	Jack Mooring, Leeland Dayton Mooring, Marty Sampson	Darlene Zschech		04:58
10	His Glory Appears (Recorded On 29 March 2009 At Sydney Entertainment Centre)	Darlene Zschech, Marty Sampson	Brooke Fraser-Ligertwood		03:20
11	We The Redeemed (Recorded On 8 March 2009 At Hillsong City Campus)	Jill McCloghry	Jill McCloghry		07:31
12	We Will See Him (Recorded On 29 March 2009 At Sydney Entertainment Centre)	Robert Fergusson, Reuben Morgan	Reuben Morgan	Joel Houston	06:41
13	You Hold Me Now (Recorded On 1 March 2009 At Hillsong Convention Centre)	Matt Crocker, Reuben Morgan	Jad Gillies, Joel Houston	Darlene Zschech	08:16

== Track listing (DVD) ==
1. No Reason To Hide (Joel Houston)
2. God One and Only (Jonathon Douglass)
3. It's Your Love (Darlene Zschech)
4. I Will Exalt You (Brooke Fraser)
5. Yahweh (Dave Ware & Darlene Zschech)
6. The First and The Last (Joel Houston)
7. For Your Name (Jad Gillies)
8. Glow (Dave Ware)
9. The Wonder of Your Love (Darlene Zschech)
10. His Glory Appears (Brooke Fraser)
11. We The Redeemed (Jill McCloghry)
12. We Will See Him (Reuben Morgan)
13. You Hold Me Now (Jad Gillies)

== Charts ==
Chart (2009)	Peak position
ARIA Top 50 Albums Chart (Australia)	12
New Zealand Albums Chart	18
U.S. Billboard 200	47
U.S. Billboard Christian Albums	2

== Awards ==
The album was nominated for a Dove Award for Long Form Music Video of the Year at the 41st GMA Dove Awards.

== Personnel ==
- Darlene Zschech – senior worship leader, senior lead vocal, songwriter
- Reuben Morgan – worship pastor, worship leader, acoustic guitar, lead vocal
- Joel Houston – creative director, worship leader, acoustic guitar, vocal
- Brooke Fraser – worship leader, acoustic guitar
- Jad Gillies – worship leader, vocal, electric guitar, acoustic guitar on "You Hold Me Now"
- Jonathon Douglass (JD) - worship leader, vocal
- Dave Ware - worship leader, vocals
- Jill McCloghry - Worship leader, acoustic guitar
- Annie Garratt - leader backup vocal
- Matty Crocker - leader backup vocal
- Katie Dodson - back vocal
- Sam Knock - back vocal
- Kathryn de Araujo - back vocal
- Esther Donnelly - back vocal
- Emily Hayes - back vocal
- Karen Horn - back vocal
- Anneka Knock - back vocal
- Catherine Vasilakis - back vocal
- Nigel Hendroff - electric & acoustic guitar, music director & arranger
- Ben Fielding - electric guitar
- Timon Klein - electric guitar
- Grant Klassen - electric guitar
- Autumn Hardman - keyboards, music director
- David Andrew - keyboards
- Peter James - keyboards
- Roland James - keyboards
- Matthew Tennikoff - bass guitar
- Adam Crosariol - bass guitar
- Joshua Gagner - bass
- Bob Mpofu - bass
- Ben Whincop - bass guitar
- Rolf Wam Fjell - drums
- Brandon Gillies - drums
- Gabriel Kelly - drums
- Simon Kobler - drums
- Leora Gardner - violin
- Hanna Crezee - violin
- Celeste Shackleton - cello
- Marc Warry - trombone
- Elizabeth Gorringe - French horn
- Tim Whincop - trumpet
- The Hillsong Choir

Creative arts

- Joel Houston - creative director
- Jay Argaet - artwork manager, art director
- Nicole Scott - art director, digital designing
- Giles Lambert - cover concept and design
- Adan Hancock - creative contributor
- Glenn Stewart - creative contributor

Production team

- Joel Houston – producer
- Reuben Morgan – producer
- Ben Whincop – audio engineer
- Andrew Crawford – audio engineer
- Jim Monk – audio engineer
- Josh Telford – audio engineer
- James Hurley – audio engineer
- Brad Law – live record production management
- Tim Whincop – project manager
- Laura Kelly – project co–ordinator
- Josh Bonett – event stage direction
- Lacey Parsons – event stage direction
- Nathan Taylor – event stage direction
- Andrew Starke – technical director
- Ryan Watts-Thomas – technical director
- Lukas Jundt – technical director
- Grant Baker – technical director
- Ashley Byron – stage manager
- Eliane Weyermann – stage manager
- Jessica Williams – stage manager
- Kai Arne Martinson – stage manager
- Kevin Kwan – stage manager
- Sage Williams – stage manager
- Gary Chan – stage manager
- Julie Lachapelle – stage manager
- Adam Dodson – stage manager
- Michael Cuthbertson – event production manager, front of house engineer
- Bentleigh Tadman – front of house engineer
- Paul Ross – front of house comms
- Muchiri Gateri – monitor engineer
- Laura Cooper – monitor engineer
- Nelda Samy – monitor engineer
- Andrew Starr – monitor engineer
- Reid Wall – monitor engineer
- Solomon Mickley – monitor engineer
