= Crazy Noise =

Crazy Noise may refer to:

- Crazy Noise (Stezo album), 1989
- Crazy Noise (Hillsong album), 2011
