= This Is Our God =

Live album by Hillsong Worship
- Released: 5 July 2008
- Recorded: 9 March 2008
- Venues: Acer Arena, Sydney, Australia
- Genre: Contemporary worship
- Length: 77:13
- Label: Hillsong
- Producers: Joel Houston, Andrew Crawford, Reuben Morgan

Hillsong Music Australia Live praise & worship chronology
Saviour King (2007)	This Is Our God (2008)	Faith + Hope + Love (2009)

This Is Our God is the seventeenth album in the live praise and worship series of contemporary worship music by Hillsong Church. It was recorded live at the Acer Arena on 9 March 2008 by Reuben Morgan, Joel Houston, Darlene Zschech, and the Hillsong Live Worship team with a crowd of over 10,000 worshippers. The album opened at No. 2 on the ARIA Top 50 Albums Chart in Australia. The album attracted controversy over the song "Healer", which was removed from later editions.

== Album information ==
This Is Our God is the first Hillsong album since 1996 on which Darlene Zschech has not appeared as worship pastor, since Reuben Morgan officially became the new worship pastor of Hillsong in 2008. It also features a greater variety of singers, as the church's most traditional worship leaders are not as heavily featured.

This is the third album released under their new name 'Hillsong Live'. Even though Hillsong has been using the 'Live' logo on their albums since 2006's Mighty To Save as well as listing these albums under 'Hillsong Live' on their website for some time, This Is Our God is the first album to be officially released with 'Hillsong Live' listed as the artist name on the spine of the CD and DVD.

The majority of the songs were written by Reuben Morgan, Darlene Zschech, Joel Houston, Michael Guglielmucci, Matt Crocker, Brooke Fraser, and Ben Fielding.

=== "Healer" ===
On 21 August 2008, the album attracted controversy when a worship leader from Planetshakers Church and former member of the band Planetshakers, Michael Guglielmucci, admitted that in 2006 he had fabricated a story that he was suffering from cancer when he composed and then performed song "Healer", that appeared on the album. Guglielmucci later said that the story had been fabricated to hide a 16-year addiction to pornography. Representatives of churches with which Guglielmucci had affiliations told the press they were totally unaware of this situation. In an email sent to Hillsong members, the church's general manager, George Aghajanian, said the news was even a shock to Guglielmucci's own family and that the suspended pastor was seeking professional help. He was suspended from the church and actions taken to return the money obtained fraudulently. The track "Healer" has since then been removed from the track listing in future releases of the album.

== Track listing ==
CD

Track	Song	Songwriter	Worship leader	Lead supporting vocal	Time
01	"Your Name High"	Joel Houston	Joel Houston	Annie Garratt	03:56
02	"Run"	Joel Houston	Joel Houston	Annie Garratt	03:21
03	"Desert Song"	Brooke Fraser	Brooke Fraser, Jill McCloghry	—	04:12
04	"This Is Our God"	Reuben Morgan, Jill McCloghry	Reuben Morgan & Jill McCloghry	Annie Garratt, David Ware	05:49
05	"He Is Lord"	Ben Fielding	Annie Garratt & Marcus Temu	—	04:55
06	"High And Lifted Up"	Darlene Zschech, Mike Guglielmucci	Darlene Zschech	Marcus Temu, Jill McCloghry	04:38
07	"Stronger"	Reuben Morgan, Ben Fielding	Jad Gillies	Darlene Zschech	04:27
08	"Healer"	Mike Guglielmucci	Mike Guglielmucci, Darlene Zschech	Joel Houston	07:06
09	"You Are Here (The Same Power)"	Dave George, Grant Pankratz	Joel Houston, Darlene Zschech	Mike Guglielmucci	02:52
10	"You Deserve"	Matt Crocker, James Dunlop	Sam Knock	Jonathon Douglass, Annie Garratt	04:38
11	"Across The Earth"	Reuben Morgan, Matt Crocker	Matt Crocker	Annie Garratt	04:30
12	"Where We Belong"	Reuben Morgan, Joel Davies	Joel Davies	Reuben Morgan, Brooke Fraser	05:33
13	"Sing To The Lord"	Mike Guglielmucci, Matt Crocker	Marty Sampson	Brooke Fraser	06:44
14	"You'll Come"	Brooke Fraser	Brooke Fraser, Darlene Zschech	Joel Houston	05:05
15	"Turn Your Eyes Upon Jesus"	Helen Howarth Lemmel	Brooke Fraser	—	01:46
16	"With Everything"	Joel Houston	Joel Houston	Darlene Zschech, Sam Knock	07:56

DVD

1. "Bible Reading & Prayer" (Isaiah 42:8-13) (Joel Houston)
2. "Your Name High" (Joel Houston)
3. "Run" (Joel Houston)
4. "Across the Earth" (Matt Crocker)
5. "Bible Reading" (Philippians 2:6-11)
6. "This Is Our God" (Jill McCloghry and Reuben Morgan)
7. "He Is Lord" (Annie Garratt and Marcus Temu)
8. "High and Lifted Up" (Darlene Zschech)
9. "Stronger" (Jad Gillies)
10. "Bible Reading" (Isaiah 53:1-5) (Mike Guglielmucci)
11. "Healer" (Mike Guglielmucci) [**Removed from current releases**]
12. "You are Here (The Same Power) (Joel Houston) [**Removed from current releases**]
13. "Bible Reading" (Isaiah 60:1-5, 18–22)
14. "You Deserve" (Sam Knock)
15. "Alive in You" [Author : Mike Guglielmucci & Scott Ligertwood] (Jonathon Douglass & Sam Knock)
16. "Bible Reading" (Psalm 66) (Jill McCloghry)
17. "Desert Song" (Brooke Fraser and Jill McCloghry)
18. "Sing to the Lord" (Marty Sampson)
19. "Where We Belong" (Joel Davies)
20. "Bible Reading" (Hosea 6:1-3) (Brooke Fraser)
21. "You'll Come" (Brooke Fraser and Darlene Zschech)
22. "Turn Your Eyes Upon Jesus" (Brooke Fraser)
23. "With Everything" (Joel Houston)
24. "Benediction" (Revelation 4:8, 11; 5:9-10, 12, 13b; Hebrews 13:20-21; 2 Corinthians 13:14) (Robert Fergusson)
25. "With Everything" (Reprise/Instrumental) [Drum : Rolf Wam Fjell, Bass : Ntando 'Bob' Mpofu, Keyboard : Kevin Lee]

Note: The DVD sub-menu "Song Selection" contains track listings for songs only. Spoken-word tracks may be accessed directly using navigation buttons while watching the feature

Documentary

1. "This Is Our God"
2. "Desert Song"
3. "Turn Your Eyes Upon Jesus"
4. "Your Name High" (Intro)
5. "With Everything"

== Personnel ==
Adapted from AllMusic

- David Andrew – keyboards
- Grant Baker – audio engineer
- Matt Crocker – worship leader, backing vocal, songwriter
- Joel Davies – worship leader, backing vocal, songwriter
- Trent Dobson – audio engineer
- Jonathan Douglass – worship leader, backing vocal
- Ben Fielding – electric guitar
- Rolf Wam Fjell – drums
- Brooke Fraser – worship leader, backing vocal, acoustic guitar, songwriter
- Annie Garratt – worship leader, backing vocal
- Brandon Gillies – drums
- Jad Gillies – worship leader, backing vocal, electric guitar
- Mike Guglielmucci – worship leader, backing vocal, acoustic guitar, songwriter
- Autumn Hardman – keyboards
- Nigel Hendroff – electric guitar
- Joel Hingston – electric guitar
- Andrew Hood – electric guitar
- Bobbie Houston – senior pastor
- Brian Houston – senior pastor
- Joel Houston – creative director, worship leader, acoustic guitar, backing vocal, songwriter
- James Hurley – audio engineer
- Peter James – keyboards
- Roland James – keyboards
- Gabriel Kelly – drums
- Timon Klein – electric guitar
- Sam Knock – worship leader, backing vocal, acoustic guitar
- Braden Lang – vocals
- Kevin Lee – keyboards
- Steve Leroux – audio engineer
- Jill McCloghry – worship leader, backing vocal, acoustic guitar, songwriter
- Jim Monk – audio engineer
- Reuben Morgan – worship pastor, electric guitar, backing vocal, songwriter
- Ntando 'Bob' Mpofu – bass guitar
- Josh Nickel – audio engineer, post audio
- Sam O'Donell – drum technician
- Marty Sampson – worship leader, acoustic guitar
- Josh Telford – audio engineer
- Marcus Temu – worship leader, backing vocal
- Matthew Tennikoff – bass guitar
- Dylan Thomas – electric guitar
- Dean Ussher – electric guitar
- Peter Wallis – audio engineer
- David Ware – backing vocal
- Ben Whincop – audio engineer, post audio
- Darlene Zschech – senior worship leader, senior lead vocal, backing vocal, songwriter

== Charts ==
=== Weekly charts ===
Chart (2008)	Peak position
Australian Albums (ARIA)	2
New Zealand Albums (RMNZ)	9
US Billboard 200	55
US Top Christian Albums (Billboard)	2

=== Year-end charts ===
Chart (2008)	Position
Australian Albums (ARIA)	92
US Christian Albums (Billboard)	50
