= God He Reigns =

Live album by Hillsong Worship
- Released: 3 July 2005
- Recorded: 27 February 2005
- Venue: Sydney Entertainment Centre, Sydney, Australia
- Studio: The Grove Studios (mixing), Studios 301 (mastering)
- Genre: Contemporary worship music
- Length: 95:28 (DVD – 100:21)
- Label: Hillsong
- Producer: Darlene Zschech

Hillsong Music Australia chronology
For All You've Done (2004)	God He Reigns (2005)	Mighty to Save (2006)

God He Reigns is the fourteenth album in the live praise and worship series of contemporary worship music by Hillsong Church. A single-disc version of this album was released in North America and South America by Integrity Media. The album reached No. 2 on the ARIA Albums Chart.

== Recording ==
God He Reigns was recorded live at the Sydney Entertainment Centre on 27 February 2005 by Darlene Zschech and the Hillsong team with a congregation of 10,500. God He Reigns was released at the annual Hillsong Conference in July.

== Writing and composition ==
The majority of songs were written by Marty Sampson, Darlene Zschech, Reuben Morgan, and Joel Houston. Raymond Badham, Ned Davies, Mia Fieldes and Miriam Webster also contributed to writing songs. Songs were written in the 12 months prior to the album recording, some songs were first recorded on the Hillsong United album Look to You.

== Commercial performance ==
God He Reigns reached No. 2 on the Australian album charts and the DVD hit No. 1. Initially, there was doubt as to the commercial success of the album as the release coincided with the release of new albums by Guy Sebastian and Paulini, but in that week more copies of God He Reigns were sold than every other CD in Australia combined (including pop charts, alternative, rock, et cetera).

== Track listing, double CD ==
Disc 1

1. "Let Creation Sing" (Reuben Morgan) Worship leader: Darlene Zschech, backing vocal: Reuben Morgan
2. "Salvation Is Here" (Joel Houston) Worship leader: Joel Houston, backing vocal: Darlene Zschech
3. "His Love" (Raymond Badham) Worship leaders: Darlene Zschech and Paul Andrew
4. "Emmanuel" (Reuben Morgan) Worship leader: Darlene Zschech, backing vocal: Reuben Morgan
5. "Saviour" (Darlene Zschech) Worship leader: Miriam Webster
6. "Wonderful God" (Ned Davies) Worship leader: Darlene Zschech, backing vocal: Joel Houston
7. "God He Reigns"/"All I Need Is You" (chorus) (Marty Sampson) Worship leader: Darlene Zschech
8. "Yours Is the Kingdom" (Joel Houston) Worship leader: Marty Sampson, backing vocal: Darlene Zschech
9. "Welcome in This Place" (Miriam Webster) Worship leader: Darlene Zschech

Disc 2

1. "Let Us Adore" (Reuben Morgan) Worship leader: Darlene Zschech, backing vocal: Reuben Morgan
2. "All for Love" (Mia Fieldes) Worship leaders: Marcus Temu, Tulele Faletolu, Barry Southgate, backing vocals: Tolu Faletolu, Gilbert Clarke, Nathan Phillips
3. "Know You More" (Darlene Zschech), Worship leaders: Dee Uluirewa and Darlene Zschech
4. "There Is Nothing Like" (Marty Sampson and Jonas Myrin) Worship leader: Marty Sampson
5. "What the World Will Never Take" (Matt Crocker, Scott Ligertwood and Marty Sampson), Worship leaders: Marty Sampson & Tulele Faletolu
6. "Tell the World" (Jonathan Douglass, Joel Houston and Marty Sampson) Worship leaders: Joel Houston, Marty Sampson & Jonathan Douglass, backing vocal: Darlene Zschech

== Track listing, single CD ==
1. "Let Creation Sing" (Reuben Morgan)
2. "Salvation Is Here" (Joel Houston)
3. "His Love" (Raymond Badham)
4. "Emmanuel" (Morgan)
5. "Saviour" (Darlene Zschech)
6. "Wonderful God" (Ned Davies)
7. "God He Reigns"/"All I Need Is You" (chorus) (Marty Sampson)
8. "Yours Is the Kingdom" (Houston)
9. "Welcome in This Place" (Miriam Webster)
10. "Let Us Adore" (Morgan)
11. "All for Love" (Mia Fieldes)(Men of Hillsong)
12. "Know You More" (Zschech)
13. "There Is Nothing Like" (Sampson, Jonas Myrin)

== Personnel ==
- Darlene Zschech – producer, vocals, songwriter
- Joel Houston – assistant producer, acoustic guitar, vocals, songwriter
- Julia A'Bell – vocals
- Vera Kasevich – vocals
- Paul Andrew – vocals
- Julie Bassett – vocals, vocal production
- Gilbert Clark – vocals
- Holly Dawson – vocals
- Jonathan Douglass – vocals
- Deb Ezzy – vocals
- Faletolu Faletolu – vocals
- Tulele Faletolu – vocals
- Lucy Fisher – vocals
- Michelle Grigg – vocals
- Peter Hart – vocals
- Scott Haslem – vocals, vocal production
- Karen Horn – vocals
- Steve McPherson – vocals, vocal production
- Nathan Phillips – vocals
- Aran Puddle – vocals, production
- Barry Southgate – vocals
- Katrina Tadman – vocals
- Marcus Temu – vocals
- Dee Uluirewa – vocals, vocal production
- Beci Wakerley – vocals
- Raymond Badham – acoustic guitar, electric guitar, music direction, production
- Reuben Morgan – acoustic guitar, vocals, songwriter
- Paul Nevison – acoustic guitar, vocals
- Marty Sampson – acoustic guitar, vocals, songwriter
- Jad Gillies – electric guitar
- Nigel Hendroff – electric guitar
- Adrian Lewis – electric guitar
- Paul Peipman – electric guitar
- Peter Wilson – electric guitar
- Gio Galanti – keyboards
- Kevin Lee – keyboards
- Matthew Hope – trumpet, brass director, flugelhorn
- Christopher Booth – trumpet
- Tim Whincop – trumpet, production, flugelhorn
- Stephanie Lambert – trumpet
- Timothy Dearmin – saxophone
- Gary Honor – saxophone
- John Kasinathan – trombone
- Rebecca Gunn – cello
- Tirza Van Breda – cello
- Matt Tennikoff – bass
- George Whippy – bass
- Sonja Bailey – percussion
- Peter Kelly – percussion, production
- Amy Palmer – percussion
- Elisha Vella – percussion
- Rolf Wam Fjell – drums

=== Technical ===
- Matt Crocker – drum technician
- Marty Beaton – guitar technician
- Marcüs Beaumont – guitar technician
- Rob Drayton – guitar technician
- Dan Munns – guitar technician
- Brent Clarke – mixing engineer
- Blair Simmons – assistant engineer
- Josh Telford – assistant engineer
- Don Bartley – mastering engineer
- Peter Wallis – recording engineer
- Phil Blackbourne – recording engineer
- Andy Sorenson – recording engineer
- Michael Cuthbertson – front of house concert engineer
