= Shout to the Lord =

Song by Darlene Zschech

from the album People Just Like Us
- Released: 1994
- Recorded: 1993
- Genre: Contemporary worship music
- Label: Hillsong Music Australia
- Songwriter: Darlene Zschech

"Shout to the Lord" is a praise and worship song written by Christian worship leader Darlene Zschech in 1993. A popular worship power ballad, it was published by Hillsong Music Australia.

On 9 April 2008, "Shout to the Lord" was the closing song on Idol Gives Back, sung by the remaining eight contestants of American Idol and a gospel choir. The lyrics of the song were altered, changing the word "Jesus" to "Shepherd" in the first line, without the approval of Zschech or Hillsong Church. At the request of the song's publishers, the song was performed again at the opening of the next show the following night, this time using the original lyrics. The studio version of the performance charted at number 43 in the Billboard Hot 100, based on digital download sales alone.

== Background ==
"Shout to the Lord" by singer-songwriter Darlene Zschech was written during the time she was struggling with financial worries and the stresses of raising a young family.

== Recordings ==
"Shout to the Lord" appears on the following albums:

- People Just Like Us (1994)
- Rivers of Joy, by Don Moen (1995)
- Celebra Al Señor, by Danilo Montero (1995)
- Shout to the Lord (1996)
- Shout to the Lord 2000 (1998)
- Diante do Trono by Diante do Trono (1998)
- En Tú Presencia, by Don Moen and Sandi Patty (1999)
- Canta Al Señor, by Ingrid Rosario (1999)
- You Are Holy, by Heritage Singers (1999)
- Más de Ti with Don Moen, Paul Wilbur and Aline Barros (2000)
- Aclame ao Senhor com Ana Paula Valadão (2000)
- Ardent Worship by Skillet (2000)
- Extravagant Worship: The Songs of Darlene Zschech (2002)
- The Platinum Collection Volume 1: Shout to the Lord (2003)
- The Platinum Collection Volume 2: Shout to the Lord 2 (2003)
- Kiss of Heaven (2003)
- Ultimate Worship (2005)
- Glory Train: Songs of Faith, Worship, and Praise by Randy Travis (2005)
- Revealing Jesus (2013)
- Testament (2024) with Zoe Cameron (née Zschech, Darlene's youngest daughter) and Australian Christian Orchestra
