= Mighty to Save (song) =

Song by Hillsong Worship

from the album Mighty to Save
- Released: 2006
- Recorded: 5 March 2006
- Genre: Contemporary worship music
- Length: 6:50
- Label: Hillsong Music
- Songwriter(s): Ben Fielding · Reuben Morgan

"Mighty to Save" is a contemporary worship song by Hillsong Worship from the 2006 album Mighty to Save. The song was written by Ben Fielding and Reuben Morgan. The rights to the song are registered for Hillsong Publishing. The song was recorded live on 5 March 2006 at the Sydney Entertainment Centre, Sydney, Australia. "Mighty to Save" won the Dove Award for Worship Song of the Year at the Dove Awards in 2009.

== Composition ==
The song is composed in the key of A major, with a medium tempo of 73 BPM.

== Awards and nominations ==
"Mighty to Save" was nominated for "Song of the Year" and won "Worship Song of the Year" at the 40th GMA Dove Awards.

== Cover versions ==
The song has been covered by many artists, including Laura Story for her 2008 album Great God Who Saves. Her version peaked at No. 9 on the Billboard Hot Christian Songs chart.
