= Darlene Zschech =

Australian singer and pastor

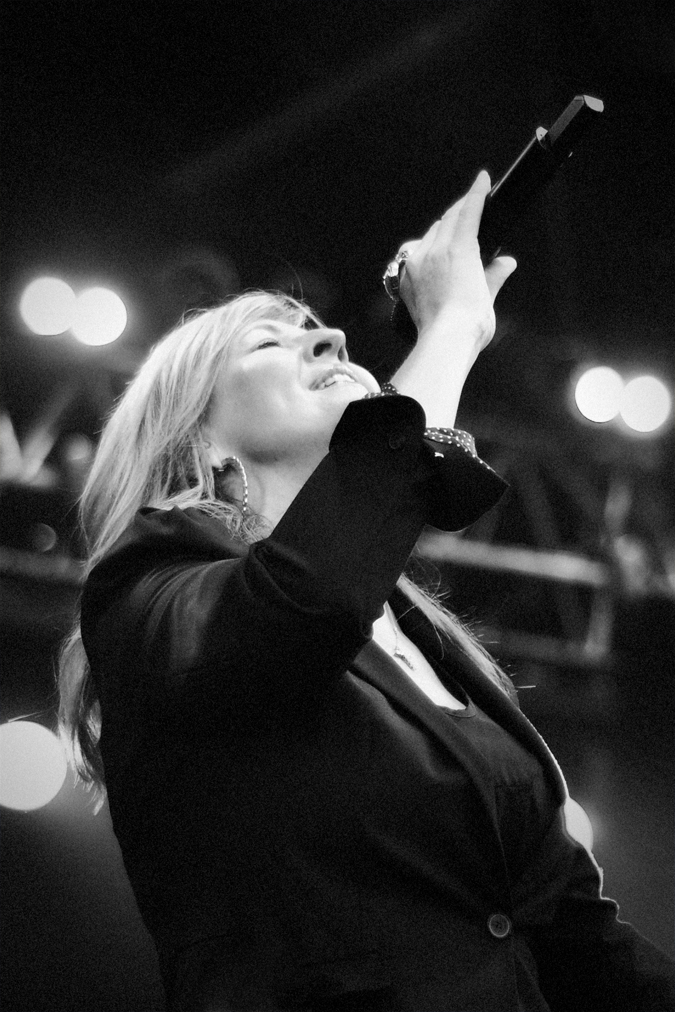
- Born: Darlene Joyce Steinhardt; 8 September 1965 (age 60); Brisbane, Queensland, Australia
- Occupations: Singer; songwriter; pastor
- Years active: 1989–present
- Spouse: Mark Zschech
- Children: 3
- Musical career
- Genres: Contemporary worship music; CCM
- Instrument: Vocals
- Labels: Hillsong; INO; Integrity
- Formerly of: Hillsong Worship
- Website: darlenezschech.com

Darlene Joyce Zschech (/dɑːrˈliːn ˈtʃɛk/; née Steinhardt; 8 September 1965) is an Australian Pentecostal Christian worship leader and singer who primarily writes praise and worship songs. Described as a pioneer of the modern worship movement, she is the former worship pastor of Hillsong Church. Zschech is currently a contributing songwriter with CompassionArt, a charity founded by Christian songwriter Martin Smith. Along with her husband, Zschech is the lead pastor of Hope Unlimited Church in New South Wales.

== Early life ==
Zschech starred on television at the age of ten, as part of an Australian children's show, Happy Go Round. When she was 13, her parents divorced and the emotional stress of being on television and her parents' divorce resulted in her having bulimia for about four years.

In 1980, when Zschech was 15, her father rededicated his life to Christ and began taking her to church, where she also became a committed Christian and met her future husband, Mark Zschech. When they married, her husband suggested that they move from Brisbane to Sydney, which was confirmed at a small church they were visiting one Sunday when the guest speaker said in the middle of his sermon, "This doesn't happen to me very often, but whatever it is you two prayed last night, God says to do it now." They began attending Hills Christian Life Centre, which would become Hillsong Church.

Zschech sang jingles for several international companies including McDonald's, KFC and Coca-Cola.

=== Career ===
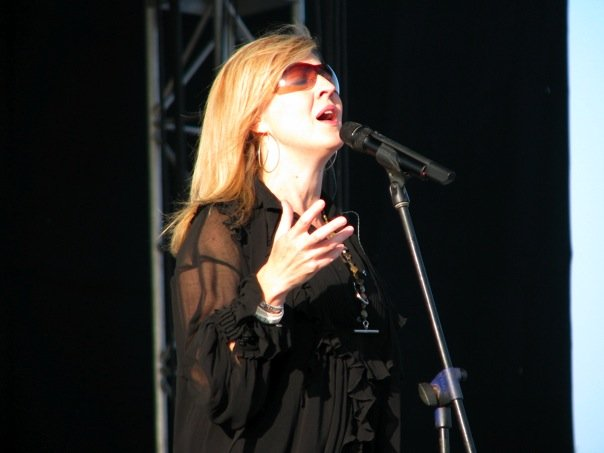
Zschech during a tour in Bangalore, India

She released Make the Choice in 1987 and Pearls & Gold in 1993. She eventually joined the staff of Hillsong Church after penning "Shout to the Lord" in 1993. When she presented it to Hillsong's then-worship pastor, Geoff Bullock, she was so embarrassed that she requested he face away from her as she played and sang. It was first recorded on People Just Like Us and has appeared on more than 200 different albums by numerous artists in multiple languages. It is also the title track for the first live album co-produced with Integrity Music featuring Zschech as a worship leader. It was Integrity Music's first album to feature a female worship leader. The album was nominated for Praise & Worship Album of the Year at the 1997 Dove Awards. The song was nominated in the 1998 Dove Awards' Song of the Year category. It has been performed for the Pope at the Vatican and for the President of the United States. The song has become one of the most well-known modern worship songs, being sung by an estimated 25–30 million churchgoers every Sunday since the song's release. She wrote the song during a time of personal struggle.

Shout to the Lord, the album, was nominated as Album of the Year for the 1997 Dove Awards and Song of the Year for the 1998 Dove Awards. In 2000, Zschech received a Dove Award nomination for Songwriter of the Year and received the International Award for influence in praise and worship.

Zschech was the worship pastor of Hillsong Church from 1996 to 2007, during which time she served as producer, vocal producer or executive producer for more than 20 albums under the Hillsong Music label and wrote more than 80 published worship songs. Under Zschech's leadership, the album People Just Like Us (1994) was the first Christian album in Australia to be certified gold and platinum, and the album For All You've Done (2004) debuted at No. 1 on the Australian Record Industry Association album charts.

In 2003, Zschech released her first official solo album, Kiss of Heaven. Change Your World followed in 2005. She has since released two albums, in 2011, called Simply Darlene and You Are Love. In addition to writing songs, she has written five books: Worship (1996), Extravagant Worship (2002), The Kiss of Heaven (2003), The Great Generational Transition (2009) and Revealing Jesus: A 365-Day Devotional (2013).

In January 2011, with her husband, she became senior pastor of Hope Unlimited Church in New South Wales. Since becoming lead pastors there, Hope Unlimited has transitioned from being a local ministry to having a worldwide outreach with locations throughout Australia, India, and four major cities in the United States. The church also livestreams services through HopeUC.tv where the weekly services are also available on demand.

== Discography ==
The following is a list by year of albums or single tracks which feature Zschech as a prominent vocalist or worship leader.

Year	Featured on	Notes
1987	Make the Choice (Darlene Zschech)	Zschech's first solo studio album release
1988	Spirit and Truth (Hillsong Music International)	Studio album. First album released by Hillsongs Australia.
1990	Show Your Glory (Hillsong Music Australia)	Featured vocalist on title track.
1990	Present History (Global Satellite)	Debut (and only) album released by pop group Present History (of which Zschech was a member with Peter Beveridge. Zschech wrote or co-wrote songs on the project.
1992	The Power of Your Love (Hillsong Music Australia)	The first live album released by Hillsong Music Australia (then Hillsongs Australia)
1993	Stone's Been Rolled Away (Hillsong Music Australia)	Wrote "Your Name" and featured worship leader.
1993	Pearls & Gold (Darlene Zschech)	Zschech's second solo studio album release
1994	People Just Like Us (Hillsong Music Australia)	First recording of "Shout to the Lord". Zschech is a prominent featured worship leader and singer.
1994	Jump to the Jam (Youth Alive / Hillsong Music Australia)	Zschech wrote Shout To The Lord and Always Singing Your Praise. Zschech was also a featured worship leader. Recorded live at the Sydney Entertainment Centre in December 1994.
1994	Praise Rhapsody (Re-released in 2000 as The Power Of Your Love Symphony)	Featured worship leader, main artist and performer. Recorded live in Perth, Western Australia. Featuring the West Australian Symphony Orchestra under the direction and arrangement of Ralph Carmichael
1995	Friends in High Places (Hillsong Music Australia)	Wrote "Praise His Holy Name", "Rock of Ages" with Geoff Bullock and "Lord I Give Myself"
1996	God is in the House (Hillsong Music Australia)	Darlene's first Hillsong Worship album as worship pastor; wrote "God Is in the House" with Russell Fragar, "And That My Soul Knows Very Well" with Fragar, "Let the Peace of God Reign", "Walking in the Light" and "I Will Run To You"
1996	Simply Worship (Hillsong Music Australia)	Compilation album of previously released worship songs and a new studio recording of "One Hope" written by Darlene Zschech and Russell Fragar. Released in 1996 by Hillsong Music Australia.
1996	Chosen One (Youth Alive / Hillsong Music Australia)	Zschech's And That My Soul Knows Very Well was covered by the Youth Alive team.
1996	Shout to the Lord (Integrity Music)	The first Integrity Music album to feature a female worship leader.
1997	All Things Are Possible (Hillsong Music Australia)	Wrote "All Things Are Possible", "I Live to Know You", "I Know It" and "Glory to the King"
1997	Simply Worship 2 (Hillsong Music Australia)	Compilation album of previously released worship songs and new studio recordings of new songs from Hillsong Music Australia.
1997	Hills Praise (Hillsong Music Australia and Integrity Music)	Compilation album of previously released praise songs from Hillsong Music Australia.
1997	I Believe the Promise (London Christian Media Centre)	Recorded live in London, U.K. as part of a ministry trip with then Hillsong Church senior pastor Brian Houston.
1998	Touching Heaven, Changing Earth (Hillsong Music Australia)	Wrote the songs "That's What We Came Here For" with Fragar, "I Will Bless You Lord", "Jesus You're All I Need" and "The Potter's Hand"
1998	You Shine (Hillsong Music Australia)	First release of "Simply Worship 3" before being retitled on all later releases.
1998	Simply Worship 3 (Hillsong Music Australia)	Compilation album of previously released worship songs and new studio recordings of new songs from Hillsong Music Australia.
1999	Shout to the Lord 2000 (Integrity Music)	Second live album co-produced with Integrity Music. Featuring Ron Kenoly and Alvin Slaughter. Recorded live at the '98 Hillsong Conference at The State Sports Centre at Homebush, NSW.
1999	By Your Side (Hillsong Music Australia)	Wrote "Sing of Your Great Love" and "Free to Dance"; album received a nomination for Praise & Worship Album of the Year at the 2001 Dove Awards
2000	For This Cause (Hillsong Music Australia)	Wrote "Here to Eternity" with David Moyse and "It Is You"
2000	The Power of Your Love Symphony (Sony Music)	Re-release of 1994's Praise Rhapsody.
2000	Overwhelmed (Hillsong Music Australia)	wrote "Overwhelmed", "Jesus, Our Lord Jesus" and "The Lord is Good" with Reuben Morgan
2000	The Platinum Collection Volume 1: Shout to the Lord (Hillsong Music Australia)	Originally released in 1999 as Millennium: The Story So Far; a compilation of previously released songs by Hillsong Music Australia.
2001	You Are My World (Hillsong Music Australia)	wrote "Irresistible", "Glorious", "To You" and "Worthy Is the Lamb"; the album received a nomination for Praise & Worship Album of the Year at the 2002 Dove Awards
2001	Christmas (Hillsong Music Australia)	Re-release of Jesus: Christmas Worship Down Under. Wrote "Perfect Love" with Russell Fragar and "Hallelujah"
2002	Blessed (Hillsong Music Australia)	wrote "Blessed" with Reuben Morgan; the album received a nomination for Praise & Worship Album of the Year at the 2003 Dove Awards
2002	Extravagant Worship: The Songs of Darlene Zschech (Hillsong Music Australia)	A compilation of previously recorded songs; the tracks that were written by Zschech but previously recorded by a different lead vocalist were re-recorded with Zschech as the lead vocal.
2002	Extravagant Worship: The Songs of Reuben Morgan (Hillsong Music Australia)	
2002	Amazing Love (Hillsong Music Australia)	Featured singer / worship leader.
2003	Hope (Hillsong Music Australia)	wrote "My Hope", "Call" and "You Are"; the song "My Hope" was nominated for Inspirational Song of the Year at the 2004 Dove Awards
2003	Kiss of Heaven (Darlene Zschech)	Third solo album. Released internationally by INO Records (now Fair Trade Services label).
2003	The Platinum Collection Volume 2: Shout to the Lord 2 (Hillsong Music Australia)	a compilation of previously recorded songs by the Hillsong team and a studio-recorded version of Zschech's song "My Hope"
2004	For All You've Done (Hillsong Music Australia)	wrote "You Are Worthy" and "Glorify Your Name" with David Holmes
2004	Faithful (Hillsong Music Australia)	wrote "Mercy Endures"
2004	UP: Unified Praise (Hillsong Music Australia)	Zschech and the Hillsong team joined with Delirious?
2005	God He Reigns (Hillsong Music Australia)	wrote "Saviour" and "Know You More"
2005	Celebrating Christmas (Hillsong Music Australia)	Second Christmas album released by Hillsong Music Australia.
2005	Ultimate Worship (Hillsong Music Australia)	
2005	Change Your World (Darlene Zschech)	Zschech's fourth solo studio album.
2006	Mighty to Save (Hillsong Music Australia)	wrote "More to See" with Mia Fieldes, Deborah Ezzy (Zschech's sister), Donia Makadonez & Nigel Hendroff, "I Believe" and "At the Cross" with Reuben Morgan; the song "Mighty to Save", written by Ben Fielding and Reuben Morgan, received Worship Song of the Year at the 2009 Dove Awards
2006	Songs for Communion (Hillsong Music Australia)	wrote "The Only Name", "Saviour" (which was previously recorded live on the album God He Reigns), "Oh the Blood" and "Worthy is the Lamb" (which was previously recorded live on You Are My World and Unified Praise)
2006	Supernatural (Hillsong Kids/Hillsong Music Australia)	wrote "I Will Sing" with Gio Galanti and daughters Chloe Zschech and Zoe Zschech
2007	Saviour King (Hillsong Music Australia)	wrote "One Thing" with Marty Sampson
2007	Lord of All (Hillsong Music Australia)	
2008	This Is Our God (Hillsong Music Australia)	wrote "High and Lifted Up" with Mike Guglielmucci
2008	Ultimate Collection Volume II (Hillsong Music Australia)	A compilation of previously released songs
2009	Songs 4 Worship 50	featured on the songs "Shout to the Lord" and "My Redeemer Lives"
2009	Faith + Hope + Love (Hillsong Music Australia)	wrote "His Glory Appears" with Marty Sampson
2010	A Beautiful Exchange (Hillsong Music Australia)	wrote "Believe" with Reuben Morgan
2010	The Very Best of Graham Kendrick: Knowing You Jesus (Graham Kendrick)	featured on the songs "There is a Hope So Sure" and "Until the Day"
2010	Con Todo (Hillsong Music Australia)	Zschech sings in Spanish; the album won the award for Spanish Language Album of the Year at the 42nd GMA Dove Awards
2010	One Voice	featured on the song "Awesome Wonder"
2011	God is Able (Hillsong Music Australia)	wrote "Cry of the Broken"
2011	Simply Darlene (Darlene Zschech)	
2011	You Are Love (Darlene Zschech)	
2011	Songs 4 Worship Ultimate	featured on the song "Face to Face", which she wrote
2011	The song "Lo Grande Que Eres Dios" on the album En Mi Lugar (Hillsong Music Australia)	Zschech sings in Spanish
2011	The song "Emmanuel" on the album Born is the King (Hillsong Music Australia)	
2011	Music Inspired by The Story	featured on a duet with Michael W. Smith on the track "The Great Day (Second Coming)"
2012	The song "Es Tu Amor" on the album Global Project Español (Hillsong Music Australia)	Zschech sings in Spanish
2012	25 Songs That Changed the Way We Worship	featured on the song "Shout to the Lord"
2012	Hope	featured on the song "My Hope"
2012	The song "Emmanuel" on the album We Have a Saviour (Hillsong Music Australia)	
2013	The Rescue (Sidney Mohede)	featured on the song "It is Done"
2013	Revealing Jesus (Darlene Zschech)	Zschech's first official live solo album
2013	Worship Duets (Graham Kendrick)	featured on the song "That Name"
2013	Just As I Am (A Legacy of Hymns and Worship)	featured on the song "My Jesus I Love Thee (I Love You Jesus)"
2013	In Christ Alone: 25 of Today's Most Powerful Modern Hymns	featured on the song "Your Name/Cry of the Broken"
2013	My Hope: Songs Inspired by the Message and Mission of Billy Graham	featured on the song "The Cross of Christ", which she wrote
2014	Only King Forever (Elevation Worship)	featured on the song "The Love of Jesus"
2014	Heaven is For Real: Songs Inspired by the Film and Best-Selling Book	wrote and featured as lead vocal on the song "Heaven in Me"
2015	In Jesus' Name: A Legacy of Worship & Faith	a compilation of previously recorded songs
2015	"Grace Divine" HopeUC single	featuring Darlene Zschech
2017	Here I Am Send Me (Darlene Zschech)	second live album
2017	"You Hear, You Answer" HopeUC single	featuring Darlene Zschech
2017	"O Holy Night / All Glory" HopeUC single	featuring Darlene Zschech and Luke Taylor
2018	"The Table: A Christmas Worship Gathering"	HopeUC's first Christmas album
2019	"Forever My King" Live from HopeUC Gathering	featuring Darlene Zschech, Leeland and Dustin Smith
2020	"Soli Deo Gloria" Darlene Zschech single	featuring Darlene Zschech and Mitch Wong
2020	Live "Revere" album	featuring Darlene Zschech and William McDowell on the song "Waymaker"
2021	"I Will Not Fear" Live from HopeUC Gathering	featuring Darlene Zschech
2021	"Mercy on Display" HopeUC single	featuring Darlene Zschech
2024	"Testament" (Darlene Zschech)	Zschech's studio album that featured new songs and previously recorded songs like "At The Cross", "Victor's Crown", "In Jesus' Name", etc.
2025	"Shout to the Lord" (Darlene Zschech feat. Cece Winans)	, peaked at nr.21 on Billboard"s Hot Gospel Songs and nr.3 on Gospel Digital Song Sales

== See also ==
- List of Hillsong albums
