= To the Ends of the Earth (album) =

2002 live album by Hillsong United

Live album by Hillsong United
- Released: 21 November 2002
- Recorded: 6 – 7 September 2002
- Venue: Encounterfest, Hillsong Church
- Genre: Modern Rock, Alternative Rock, CCM
- Length: 70:18
- Label: Hillsong Music Australia
- Producer: Reuben Morgan, Joel Houston, Marty Sampson

Hillsong United chronology
King of Majesty (2001)	To the Ends of the Earth (2002)	More Than Life (2004)

To the Ends of the Earth is the fourth live praise and worship by Hillsong United. The album reached the ARIA Albums Chart Top 100.

== Track listing ==
To The Ends Of The Earth track listing
No.	Title	Writer(s)	Worship leader	Length
1.	"Data (Introduction...)"	Joel Houston, James Rudder	-	00:29
2.	"All About You"	Joel Houston	Tulele Faletolu	05:06
3.	"Free"	Marty Sampson	Marty Sampson	04:02
4.	"Unify"	Michelle Fragar	Michelle Fragar	05:15
5.	"All···"	Joel Houston	Marty Sampson	06:01
6.	"To The Ends Of The Earth"	Joel Houston, Marty Sampson	Joel Houston, Katrina Peoples, Reuben Morgan	05:53
7.	"Need You Here"	Reuben Morgan	Holly Dawson, Tulele Faletolu	07:23
8.	"Glory"	Reuben Morgan	Reuben Morgan	07:39
9.	"Father, I.."	Jonathon Douglass	Reuben Morgan	05:46
10.	"My God"	Marty Sampson	Marty Sampson, Tulele Faletolu (uncredited)	05:00
11.	"Now That You're Near"	Marty Sampson	Marty Sampson	04:43
12.	"Am I To Believe?"	Joel Houston	Joel Houston	05:31
13.	"All About You ··· (Radio Mix)"	Joel Houston	Tulele Faletolu	03:35
14.	"My God ··· (Radio Mix)"	Marty Sampson	Tulele Faletolu	03:44
Total length:				70:01
