= Crazy Noise (Hillsong album) =

2011 live album by Hillsong Kids

Live album by Hillsong Church
- Released: 2011
- Genre: Contemporary Christian, Children's music
- Label: Hillsong Music Australia

Hillsong Music Australia Hillsong Kids chronology
| Ultimate Kids Collection (2009) | Crazy Noise (2011) |

Crazy Noise is the seventh live praise and worship album of contemporary Christian music for children by the Hillsong Church.

== Reception ==
Professional ratings
Review scores
| Source | Rating |
|---|---|
| AllMusic | 3/5 stars |
| Amazon | positive |
| The Christian Post | positive |

AllMusic's Jon O'Brien reviewed Crazy Noise and noted that it was "the first to be targeted specifically toward a preschool audience". A staff editor at Amazon described the album as an "energetic collection of kid-friendly praise songs, guaranteed to get your young ones on their feet and singing along!", which was aimed "especially for preschoolers and early school age children".

It was nominated for Children's Music Album of the Year at the 44th Annual GMA Dove Awards in 2013.

== Track listing ==
1. "Great Day" (Beci Wakerley, David Wakerley)
2. "Free As a Bee" (Beci Wakerley, David Wakerley)
3. "Crazy Noise" (Dan Lee-Archer, David Wakerley)
4. "Let Your Light Shine" (Andy Wallis)
5. "Tiny Little Voice" (Beci Wakerley, David Wakerley)
6. "Song of Love" (Paul Stokes)
7. "Be Strong" (Nathan Eshman, Sophie Eshman, David Wakerley)
8. "I'm So Glad" (Julia A'Bell, David Wakerley)
9. "Be Still" (Beci Wakerley, David Wakerley)
10. "Children of the Bible" (Dan Lee-Archer, David Wakerley)
11. "The Greatest Commandment" (Nathan Eshman, Sophie Eshman)
12. "Life with Jesus" (Nathan Eshman, Sophie Eshman, David Wakerley)

== Production ==
- Luke Munns – producer
- David Wakerley – producer
- Jim Monk – recording engineer
- Josh Nickel – recording engineer
- Peter Wallis – recording engineer
- Ben Whincop – recording engineer
- Josh Telford – recording engineer
