= For This Cause =

Live album by Hillsong Church
- Released: 2 July 2000
- Recorded: 5 March 2000
- Venue: State Sports Centre, Sydney, Australia
- Genre: Contemporary worship music
- Length: 73:49
- Label: Hillsong Music Australia
- Producer: Russell Fragar and Darlene Zschech

Hillsong Music Australia Live praise & worship chronology
| By Your Side (1999) | For This Cause (2000) | You Are My World (2001) |

For This Cause is the ninth album in the live praise and worship series of contemporary worship music by Hillsong Church. It was recorded live at the State Sports Centre in Sydney Olympic Park by Darlene Zschech and the Hillsong team, with a congregation of 5,000 people. The album reached No. 17 on the Billboard Top Contemporary Christian Albums Chart and No. 22 on the Top Independent Albums.

== Album design ==
The cover artwork of For This Cause, uses Charme STD as the font to display the title. This cover was designed by Chris Perry Graphic Design and Emma Schuberg (the second to last album to be design by them).

== Track listing ==
1. "One Day" (Reuben Morgan) Worship leaders: Darlene Zschech & Reuben Morgan
2. "Faith" (Reuben Morgan) Worship leader: Darlene Zschech
3. "Awesome in This Place" (Ned Davies) Worship leader: Darlene Zschech & Steve McPherson
4. "Dwell in Your House" (Paul Ewing) Worship leaders: Mark Stevens & Darlene Zschech
5. "You Are Near" (Reuben Morgan) Worship leader: Darlene Zschech b. Steve McPherson
6. "I Simply Live for You" (Russell Fragar) Worship leader: Miriam Webster b. Steve McPherson
7. "Carry Me" (Marty Sampson) Worship leader: Marty Sampson
8. "Lifted Me High Again" (Reuben Morgan) Worship leader: Darlene Zschech
9. "Here to Eternity" (Darlene Zschech, David Moyse) Worship leader: Darlene Zschech
10. "For This Cause" (Joel Houston) Worship leaders: Darlene Zschech & Reuben Morgan
11. "Reaching for You" (Raymond Badham) Worship leaders: Rob Eastwood & Darlene Zschech
12. "It Is You" (Darlene Zschech) Worship leader: Darlene Zschech
13. "Believe" (Donna Lasit) Worship leader: Darlene Zschech & Katrina Peoples
14. "Everyday" (Joel Houston) Worship leader: Mark Stevens b. Darlene Zschech
- b= lead backing vocal

== Band ==
- Darlene Zschech – worship pastor, producer, worship leader
- Russell Fragar – worship pastor, producer, music director, piano, string arranger
- Reuben Morgan – worship leader, acoustic guitar, electric guitar
- Gilbert Clarke - vocals
- Erica Crocker - vocals
- Jayne Denham - vocals
- Robert Eastwood - vocals
- Lucy Fisher - vocals
- Scott Haslem - vocals
- Donia Makedonez - vocals
- Steve McPherson - vocals
- Reuben Morgan - vocals
- Katrina Peoples - vocals
- Tanya Riches - vocals
- Marty Sampson - vocals
- Mark Stevens - vocals
- Miriam Webster - vocals
- Lisa Young - vocals
- Craig Gower - keyboards, string arranger
- Peter King - keyboards
- David Moyse - acoustic guitar, electric guitar
- Raymond Badham - electric guitar
- Paul Ewing - bass guitar
- Ian Fisher - bass guitar
- Rick Peteriet - drums
- Ross Peacock - drums
- Luke Munns - drums, percussion
- Peter Kelly - percussion
- Greg Hughes - trombone
- Matthew Hope - trumpet
- Steve Bullivant - saxophone
- Troy Carthew - saxophone, flute
- Paul Iannuzzelli - saxophone
- James Rudder - saxophone, violin
- Claire Evans - flute
- Troy Carthew - brass director
- Phillip Sohn - cello
- See Luan Loo - cello
- Rachel Baker - violin
- Lindy Connet - violin
- Ee May Hayes - violin
- Rebekah Skelton - violin
- Jai Schelbach - violin
- Denise Yu - viola
- Margaret Howard - Hillsong kids choir conductor
- Ruth Anthanasio - Hillsong Church choir conductors
- Katia Bowley - Hillsong Church choir conductors
