= Touching Heaven Changing Earth =

Live album by Hillsong Church
- Released: 5 July 1998
- Recorded: 8 March 1998
- Venues: Hills Christian Life Centre, Sydney, Australia
- Genre: Contemporary worship music
- Length: 71:38
- Label: Hillsong
- Producers: Russell Fragar, Darlene Zschech

Hillsong Music Australia Live praise & worship chronology
All Things Are Possible (1997)	Touching Heaven Changing Earth (1998)	By Your Side (1999)

Touching Heaven Changing Earth is the seventh album in the live praise and worship series of contemporary worship music by Hillsong Church. The album reached No. 31 on the Billboard Top Contemporary Christian Albums Chart.

== Making of the album ==
Touching Heaven Changing Earth was recorded live at the new Hills Christian Life Centre building (built one year earlier) by Darlene Zschech and the Hillsong team.

The majority of the songs were written by Zschech, Russell Fragar and Reuben Morgan.

== Track listing ==
1. "That's What We Came Here For" (Russell Fragar and Darlene Zschech) — 03:50 — worship leader: Darlene Zschech
2. "Touching Heaven, Changing Earth" (Reuben Morgan) — 03:52 — worship leader: Darlene Zschech, b. Steve McPherson
3. "Church On Fire" (Fragar) — 03:24 — worship leader: Gilbert Clark b. Lucy Fisher & Darlene Zschech
4. "Lord Your Goodness" (Morgan) — 03:48 — worship leader: Darlene Zschech
5. "Holy Spirit Rain Down" (Fragar) — 06:44 — worship leader: Darlene Zschech
6. "You Are Holy" (Morgan) — 05:28 — worship leader: Darlene Zschech
7. "Jesus You Gave It All" (Craig Gower) — 06:06 — worship leader: Darlene Zschech
8. "Yes And Amen" (Fragar) — 04:00 — worship leaders: Darlene Zschech & Jayne Denham, b. Gilbert Clark
9. "You Gave Me Love" (Morgan) — 04:00 — worship leader: Darlene Zschech & Mark Stevens
10. "Glorified" (Steve McPherson) — 04:06 — worship leaders: Steve McPherson & Darlene Zschech
11. "I Will Bless You Lord" (Zschech) — 05:16 — worship leaders: Miriam Webster & Rob Eastwood
12. "My Greatest Love Is You" (Fragar) — 04:31 — worship leaders: Steve McPherson, Mark Stevens, Rob Eastwood, Scott Haslem, Gilbert Clark
13. "Jesus You're All I Need" (Zschech) — 06:01 — worship leader: Darlene Zschech
14. "The Potter's Hand" (Zschech) — 07:38 — worship leader: Darlene Zschech
15. "Touching Heaven, Changing Earth (Reprise)" — 02:51
- b. = lead backing vocal

== Personnel ==
- Brian Houston – executive producer
- Darlene Zschech – producer, worship leader
- Russell Fragar – producer, piano, music director
- Marty Sampson – vocalist
- Steve McPherson – vocalist
- Miriam Webster – vocalist
- Gilbert Clark – vocalist
- Rebecca Mesiti – vocalist
- Erica Crocker – vocalist
- Donia Makedonez – vocalist
- Jayne Denham – vocalist
- Lucy Fisher – vocalist
- Lisa Young – vocalist
- Mark Stevens – vocalist
- Scott Haslem – vocalist
- Craig Gower – keyboards
- David Moyse – acoustic guitar, electric guitar
- Reuben Morgan – acoustic guitar
- Kevin O'Connor - acoustic guitar
- Ian Fisher – bass
- Paul Ewing – bass
- Rick Peteriet – drums
- Ross Peacock – drums
- Chris Miline – percussion
- Mark Gregory – trumpet, brass director
- Dominic Sirone – trumpet
- Karl Stone – trombone
- Cathy Coluccio – saxophone
- Karen Parker – tenor saxophone
- Hills Christian Life Centre Choir – choir
- Tanya Riches – choir conductor
