= Hope (Hillsong album) =

Live album by Hillsong Church
- Released: 6 July 2003
- Recorded: 7–8 March 2003, Hillsong Convention Centre, Sydney, Australia
- Genre: Contemporary worship music
- Length: 104:28
- Label: Hillsong Music Australia
- Producers: Darlene Zschech; Raymond Badham; Steve McPherson; Reuben Morgan

Hillsong Music Australia Live praise & worship chronology
Blessed (2002)	Hope (2003)	For All You've Done (2004)

Hope is the twelfth album in the live praise and worship series of contemporary worship music by Hillsong Church. The album reached No. 3 on the ARIA Albums Chart.

== Making of the album ==
Hope was recorded live at the new Hillsong Convention Centre over two nights in early 2003 by Darlene Zschech and the Hillsong team. The DVD for the album was directed by Luke Irvine.

== Track listing ==
Disc one

1. "Better Than Life" (Marty Sampson) – worship leader – Marty Sampson
2. "Glory" (Reuben Morgan) – worship leader – Darlene Zschech & Reuben Morgan
3. "Ever Living God" (Raymond Badham) – worship leader – Darlene Zschech
4. "Need You Here" (Morgan) – worship leader – Darlene Zschech
5. "My Hope" (Darlene Zschech) – worship leader – Darlene Zschech
6. "Still" (Morgan) – worship leader – Tulele Faletolu
7. "Angels" (Sampson) – worship leaders – Marty Sampson & Darlene Zschech
8. "Can't Stop Praising" (Tulele Faletolu & Sampson) – worship leader – Tulele Faletolu
9. "You Are"/"You Are Lord" ("You Are" Darlene Zschech; choir arrangement for "You Are Lord": Jennifer Va'a) – worship leader – Darlene Zschech
10. "Here I Am to Worship/Call" ("Here I Am to Worship" Tim Hughes; "Call": Darlene Zschech) – worship leaders – Reuben Morgan & Darlene Zschech
11. "Highest" (Morgan) – worship leader – Darlene Zschech

Disc two

1. "Song of Freedom" (Marty Sampson) – worship leader – Darlene Zschech
2. "Shout Your Fame" (Jonas Myrin, Natasha Bedingfield, Gio Galanti & Paul Nevison) – worship leader – Steve McPherson
3. "Exceeding Joy" (Miriam Webster) – worship leaders – Miriam Webster & Darlene Zschech
4. "King of Love" (Tanya Riches) – worship leaders – Steve McPherson & Darlene Zschech
5. "To the Ends of the Earth" (Joel Houston & Marty Sampson) – worship leader – Marty Sampson
6. "Free" (Sampson) – worship leaders – Tulele Faletolu (CD) & Joel Houston (DVD)
7. "Highest" (reprise) – worship leader – Darlene Zschech

DVD

1. "Song of Freedom"
2. "Better Than Life"
3. "Ever Living God"
4. "Exceeding Joy"
5. "Need You Here"
6. "My Hope"
7. "Can't Stop Praising"
8. "To The Ends Of The Earth"
9. "Here I Am To Worship"/"Call"
10. "Free"
11. "King Of Love"
12. "Still"
13. "You Are"/"You Are Lord"
14. "Angels"
15. "Shout Your Fame"
16. "Glory"
17. "Highest"

== Personnel ==
- Ruth Athanasio – choir conductor
- Raymond Badham – producer, acoustic guitar, music director
- Damian Bassett – vocals
- Julie Bassett – vocals
- Sonja Bailey – percussion
- Marcus Beaumont – electric guitar
- Steve Bullivant – saxophone
- Michael Guy Chislett – electric guitar
- Erica Crocker – vocals
- Ned Davies – vocals
- Holly Dawson – vocals
- Tulele Faletolu – vocals
- Ian Fisher – bass guitar
- Kylie Fisher – choir conductor
- Lucy Fisher – vocals
- Michelle Frager – vocals
- Craig Gower – piano, keyboards
- Peter Hart – vocals
- Scott Haslem – vocals, vocal production
- Nigel Hendroff – electric guitar, acoustic guitar
- Gary Honor – saxophone
- Matt Hope – trumpet, brass director
- Trent Hopkinson – trumpet
- Karen Horn – vocals
- Bobbie Houston (senior pastor) – executive producer
- Brian Houston (senior pastor) – executive producer
- Joel Houston – vocals, bass guitar
- Greg Hughes – trombone
- John Kasinathan – trombone
- Peter Kelly – percussion
- Peter King – piano, keyboards
- Stephanie Lambert – trumpet
- Garth Lazaro – vocals
- Jonno Louwrens – saxophone
- Steve Luke – trombone
- Donia Makedonez – vocals
- Steve McPherson – producer, vocals, vocal production
- Luke Munns – drums
- Reuben Morgan – producer, vocals, acoustic guitar
- Steve Ollis – choir conductor
- Paul Peipman - electric guitar
- Katrina Peoples – vocals
- Woody Pierson – vocals
- Tanya Riches – choir conductor
- James Rudder – saxophone
- Natalie Rudder – choir conductor
- Marty Sampson – vocals, acoustic guitar
- Joanna Savage – vocals
- Reuben Singleton – flute
- Andrew Sloan – choir conductor
- Elisha Vella – percussion
- Miriam Webster – vocals
- Tim Whincop – trumpet
- Martine Williams – choir conductor
- Darlene Zschech – producer, worship leader, vocal production
- Hillsong Church Choir
