= Blessed (Hillsong album) =

Live album by Hillsong Church
- Released: 30 June 2002
- Recorded: 3 March 2002
- Venues: Sydney Entertainment Centre, Sydney, Australia
- Genre: Contemporary worship music
- Length: 78:20
- Label: Hillsong
- Producer: Darlene Zschech

Hillsong Music Australia Live praise & worship chronology
You Are My World (2001)	Blessed (2002)	Hope (2003)

Blessed is the eleventh album in the live praise and worship series of contemporary worship music by Hillsong Church. It was recorded live at the Sydney Entertainment Centre on 3 March 2002 by Darlene Zschech and the Hillsong Worship Team. Blessed saw Marty Sampson step up to lead worship alongside Darlene Zschech and Reuben Morgan for the night. Over 10,000 people from Hillsong Church attended the recording. The album reached No. 4 on the ARIA Albums Chart.

== Track listing ==
1. "Blessed" (Darlene Zschech, Reuben Morgan) – lead vocals: Darlene Zschech, Reuben Morgan
2. "Now That You're Near" (Marty Sampson) – lead vocals: Marty Sampson, b. Darlene Zschech
3. "Shout of the King" (Ned Davies) – lead vocals: Darlene Zschech
4. "Made Me Glad" (Miriam Webster) – lead vocals: Darlene Zschech
5. "Through It All" (Morgan) – lead vocals: Darlene Zschech, b. Reuben Morgan
6. "Son of God" (Lincoln Brewster and Marty Sampson) – lead vocals: Marty Sampson, b. Darlene Zschech
7. "One Desire" (Joel Houston) – lead vocals: Marty Sampson, Darlene Zschech
8. "Magnificent" (Raymond Badham) – lead vocals: Tulele Faletolu
9. "I Adore" (Reuben Morgan) – lead vocals: Darlene Zschech, b. Reuben Morgan
10. "All I Do" (Gio Galanti, Natasha Bedingfield) – lead vocals: Darlene Zschech
11. "With You" (Reuben Morgan) – lead vocals: Darlene Zschech, b. Reuben Morgan
12. "Most High" (Reuben Morgan) – lead vocals: Reuben Morgan, b. Darlene Zschech
13. "King of Majesty" (Marty Sampson) – lead vocals: Tulele Faletolu, b. Darlene Zschech
14. "All the Heavens" (Reuben Morgan) – lead vocals: Darlene Zschech

b. lead backing vocals

== Personnel ==
- Brian and Bobbie Houston (senior pastors) – executive producers
- Darlene Zschech – producer, worship pastor, worship leader, senior lead vocals, vocal production, songwriter
- Reuben Morgan – lead vocals, acoustic guitar, songwriter
- Marty Sampson – lead vocals, acoustic guitar, songwriter
- Steve McPherson – vocals, vocal producer
- Miriam Webster – vocals, songwriter
- Damian Bassett – vocals
- Julie Bassett – vocals
- Erica Crocker – vocals
- Ned Davies – vocals
- Kathryn de Araujo – vocals
- Tulele Faletolu – vocals
- Lucy Fisher – vocals
- Karen Horn – vocals
- Scott Haslem – vocal production/vocals
- Peter Hart – vocals
- Garth Lazaro – vocals
- Katrina Tadman
- Woody Pierson – vocals
- David Moyse – electric guitar
- Peter King – piano, keyboards, Hammond organ
- Craig Gower – keyboards
- Kevin Lee – keyboards
- Raymond Badham – acoustic and electric guitars, music director
- Paul Peipman - electric guitar
- Nigel Hendroff – acoustic and electric guitars
- Marcus Beaumont – electric guitar
- Michael Guy Chislett – electric guitar
- Ian Fisher – bass
- Joel Houston – bass
- Mitch Farmer – drums
- Luke Munns – drums
- Jeff de Araujo – percussion
- Peter Kelly – percussion
- Sonja Bailey – percussion
- Matthew Hope – trumpet
- Steve Bullivant – saxophone
- James Rudder – saxophone, violin
- Gary Honor – saxophone
- Hillsong Church Choir – choir
- Martine Williams – choir conductor
- Ruth Athanasio – choir conductor
- Tanya Riches – choir conductor
- Andrew Sloan – choir conductor
- Josh Bonett – artwork liaison coordinator
- Carlie Carmona – artwork liaison coordinator
