= Mighty to Save (Hillsong album) =

Live album by Hillsong Worship
- Released: 2 July 2006
- Recorded: 5 March 2006
- Venue: Sydney Entertainment Centre, Sydney, Australia
- Genre: Contemporary worship music
- Length: 76:39
- Label: Hillsong Australia
- Producer: Darlene Zschech, Joel Houston, Andrew Crawford

Hillsong Music Australia Live praise & worship chronology
God He Reigns (2005)	Mighty to Save (2006)	Saviour King (2007)

Mighty to Save is the fifteenth album in the live praise and worship series of contemporary worship music by Hillsong Church. It was released in July 2006, at the annual Hillsong Conference. The album peaked at No. 25 on the ARIA Albums Chart.

== Track listing (CD) ==
Track No.	Song	Songwriter	Worship Leader	Supporting Vocal	Length
01	Take It All	Marty Sampson, Matt Crocker, & Scott Ligertwood	Marty Sampson	None	04:06
02	The Freedom We Know	Marty Sampson, Joel Houston, Matt Tennikoff	Joel Houston	Marty Sampson	04:26
03	For Who You Are	Marty Sampson	Jad Gillies	Marty Sampson	04:29
04	You Alone Are God	Ben Fielding & Reuben Morgan	Reuben Morgan & Darlene Zschech	None	06:22
05	At the Cross	Darlene Zschech & Reuben Morgan	Darlene Zschech	None	06:50
06	From The Inside Out	Joel Houston	Marty Sampson	Darlene Zschech	05:53
07	Found	Dave George	Dave George	None	05:14
08	More To See	Darlene Zschech, Mia Fieldes, Deborah Ezzy, Donia Makedonez, & Nigel Hendroff	Darlene Zschech, Debbie-Ann Bax, Miriam Webster, Deborah Ezzy, Donia Makedonez, & Lucy Fisher	Katrina Tadman & Kathryn D' Araujo	04:34
09	Adonai	Ray Badham & Mia Fieldes	Paul Andrew	Darlene Zschech	04:28
10	I Believe	Marty Sampson	Jonathan Douglass (JD)	None	03:52
11	Oceans Will Part	Ben Fielding	Annie Garratt	None	05:08
12	None But Jesus	Brooke Fraser	Darlene Zschech	Reuben Morgan	05:49
13	Higher/I Believe In You	Mia Fieldes / Darlene Zschech	Darlene Zschech & Marcus Temu	None	08:37
14	Mighty to Save	Ben Fielding & Reuben Morgan	Reuben Morgan	Darlene Zschech & Joel Houston	06:51

"Mighty to Save" was nominated for Song of the Year at the 40th GMA Dove Awards.

== Track listing (DVD) ==
1. "Take It All" (Marty Sampson)
2. "I Believe" (Jonathon Douglass)
3. "The Freedom We Know" (Joel Houston)
4. "For Who You Are" (Jad Gillies)
5. "You Alone Are God" (Reuben Morgan)
6. "Open My Eyes" (Marty Sampson & Mia Fieldes) (Darlene Zschech)
7. "Deep of Your Grace" (Mia Fieldes) (Mia Fieldes)
8. "From the Inside Out" (Marty Sampson)
9. "Found" (Dave George)
10. "More to See" (Women of Hillsong)
11. "Follow the Son" (Jay Cook & Gio Galanti) (Jonathon Douglass)
12. "Adonai" (Paul Andrew)
13. "Higher/I Believe in You" (Darlene Zschech)
14. "Oceans Will Part" (Annie Garratt)
15. "None but Jesus" (Brooke Fraser) (Darlene Zschech)
16. "At the Cross" (Reuben Morgan and Darlene Zschech) (Darlene Zschech)
17. "Mighty to Save" (Ben Fielding and Reuben Morgan) (Reuben Morgan)
18. "How Great Is Our God" (Chris Tomlin, Jesse Reeves & Ed Cash) (Darlene Zschech)

== Personnel ==
Executive producer

- Darlene Zschech (worship pastor)

Producers

- Darlene Zschech
- Joel Houston
- Andrew Crawford

Creative director

- Phil Dooley

Worship leaders

- Darlene Zschech – worship pastor, senior worship leader, senior lead vocal, songwriter
- Reuben Morgan – worship leader, acoustic guitar, songwriter
- Marty Sampson – worship leader, acoustic guitar, songwriter
- Joel Houston – united worship leader, acoustic guitar, songwriter
- Jad Gillies – worship leader, acoustic guitar, electric guitar
- Jonathan Douglass – worship leader
- Annie Garratt – worship leader
- Marcus Temu – worship leader
- Miriam Webster – worship leader
- Dave George – worship leader, keyboards
- Paul Andrew – worship leader

Vocals

- Steve McPherson – vocals, vocal production
- Damian Bassett
- Julie Bassett – vocals, vocal production
- Debbie-Ann Bax
- Erica Crocker
- Kathryn D'Araujo
- Deb Ezzy – vocals, songwriter
- Mia Fieldes – vocals, songwriter
- Lucy Fisher
- Michelle Fragar
- Dave George
- Scott Haslem
- Karen Horn
- Vera Kasevich
- Sam Knock
- Donia Makedonez
- Barry Southgate
- Katrina Tadman
- Dee Uluirewa
- Aaron Watson
- Holly Watson
- Peter Wilson - vocals, acoustic guitar

Songwriters

- Darlene Zschech
- Reuben Morgan
- Marty Sampson
- Joel Houston
- Matt Crocker
- Scott Ligertwood
- Matthew Tennikoff
- Ben Fielding
- Dave George
- Mia Fieldes
- Deborah Ezzy
- Donia Makedonez
- Nigel Hendroff
- Raymond Badham
- Brooke Fraser
- Chris Tomlin
- Jeese Reeves
- Ed Cash

Choir

- Hillsong Church Choir

Senior pastors

- Brian & Bobbie Houston

Album cover

- Cover depicts: Darlene Zschech (main image), Reuben Morgan, Marty Sampson, Joel Houston, Annie Garratt, Rolf Wam Fjell, Matthew Tennikoff and Jonathan Douglass

Musicians

- Nigel Hendroff – electric guitar
- Matthew Tennikoff – bass guitar
- Jad Gillies – guitar acoustic, electric
- Roma Kasevich - electric guitar
- Raymond Badham – electric guitar
- Alvin Douglass – keyboards
- Rolf Wam Fjell – drums
- Timon Klein – electric guitar
- Kevin Lee – keyboards
- Mitch Farmer – drums
- Autumn Hardman – keyboards
- Ian Fisher – bass guitar
- Dave George – keyboards
- Peter James – keyboards
- Peter King – keyboards
- Peter Kelly – percussion
- John Kasinathan - trombone
- Stephanie Lambert - trumpet
- Jonno Louwrens - alto saxophone
- Jared Marchman - alto saxophone
- Karen Thompson - tenor saxophone

== Certifications ==
The video of this album received a gold certification from the CRIA with 5,000 units.

== Awards ==
The title song, "Mighty to Save", won a Dove Award for Worship Song of the Year at the 40th GMA Dove Awards.
