= For All You've Done =

Live album by Hillsong Church
- Released: 4 July 2004
- Recorded: 29 February 2004
- Venues: Sydney Entertainment Centre, Sydney, Australia
- Genre: Contemporary worship music
- Length: 95:11
- Label: Hillsong
- Producers: Darlene Zschech, Raymond Badham, Joel Houston and Reuben Morgan

Hillsong Music Australia Live praise & worship chronology
Hope (2003)	For All You've Done (2004)	God He Reigns (2005)

For All You've Done is the thirteenth album in the live praise and worship series of contemporary worship music by Hillsong Church. The live album was released on 4 July 2004 on Hillsong label, which peaked at No. 1 on the ARIA Albums Chart. It had been recorded in February of that year at the Sydney Entertainment Centre with production by Darlene Zschech, Raymond Badham, Joel Houston and Reuben Morgan.

== Recording ==
For All You've Done was recorded live at the Sydney Entertainment Centre on 29 February 2004 by Darlene Zschech and the Hillsong team.

== Commercial performance ==
However, its previous two albums debuted in the top five due to the strong following of Hillsong and its previous 12 albums have achieved gold status. It is the first Christian Contemporary music album to reach the top of the Australian charts.

There was some controversy about the No. 1 debut as almost all of the albums were sold at the annual Hillsong Conference from 5 to 9 July. However, the Australian Recording Industry Association (ARIA) has defended the outcome on the grounds that For All You've Done was the best selling album in Australia that week. Pop singer and former Australian Idol contestant Paulini Curuenavuli was also at the conference promoting her No. 2 single, "Angel Eyes", from her forthcoming album, One Determined Heart.

Year	Chart	Position
2004	ARIA Top 50 Albums Chart (Australia)	1

== Track listing ==
=== CD ===
Disc 1

1. "For All You've Done" (Reuben Morgan) - Worship Leaders: Darlene Zschech & Reuben Morgan - 5:26
2. "One Way" (Jonathon Douglass & Joel Houston) Worship Leaders: Jonathon Douglass & Marty Sampson, b. Darlene Zschech - 3:43
3. "Evermore" (Joel Houston) - Worship Leaders: Marty Sampson, b. Darlene Zschech - 5:02
4. "With All I Am" (Reuben Morgan) - Worship Leaders: Darlene Zschech & Reuben Morgan - 7:23
5. "Sing (Your Love)" (Reuben Morgan) - Worship Leader: Reuben Morgan, b. Darlene Zschech - 6:22
6. "Hallelujah" (Marty Sampson & Jonas Myrin) - Worship Leaders: Jonas Myrin b. Darlene Zschech - 9:05
7. "You Are Worthy" (Darlene Zschech) Worship Leader: Darlene Zschech - 6:15
8. "Home" (Marty Sampson) - Worship Leader: Marty Sampson - 4:58

Disc 2

1. "Forever and a Day" (Raymond Badham) - Worship Leader: Darlene Zschech, b. Marty Sampson - 4:55
2. "Jesus the Same" (Raymond Badham) - Worship Leader: Steve McPherson - 5:30
3. "I Will Love" (Miriam Webster) - Worship Leader: Miriam Webster - 4:41
4. "Take All of Me" (Marty Sampson) - Worship Leader: Marty Sampson, b. Darlene Zschech - 8:15
5. "More Than Life" (Reuben Morgan) - Worship Leaders: Tulele Faletolu & Darlene Zschech - 8:52
6. "Glorify Your Name" (Darlene Zschech & David Holmes) - Worship Leader: Darlene Zschech - 7:02
7. "To You Alone" (Reuben Morgan) - Worship Leaders: Holly Dawson & Darlene Zschech - 7:39

=== DVD ===
1. "Intro"/"For All You've Done"
2. "One Way"
3. "Evermore"
4. "With All I Am"
5. "Sing (Your Love)"
6. "Hallelujah"
7. "You Are Worthy"
8. "Home"
9. "Forever and a Day"
10. "Jesus the Same"
11. "I Will Love"
12. "Take All of Me"
13. "More Than Life"
14. "Glorify Your Name"
15. "To You Alone/Credits"
16. "Resources"
- b. indicates Lead Backing Vocal

== Personnel ==
Adapted from AllMusic.

- Taijiro Adachi – assistant
- David Anderson – photography
- Ian Anderson – lighting
- Paul Andrew – vocals
- Nick Asha – engineer, post production engineer
- Ruth Athanasio – choir conductor
- Raymond Badham – acoustic guitar, music direction, producer
- Sonja Bailey – percussion
- John Barnett – engineer, post production engineer
- Don Bartley – mastering
- Damian Bassett – vocals
- Julie Bassett – vocals
- Marty Beaton – guitar technician, keyboard technician, piano technician
- Marcüs Beaumont – electric guitar
- Trevor Beck – engineer, post production engineer, technical producer
- Monica Biegalke – project coordinator
- Josh Bonett – art direction, stage design
- Christopher Booth - trumpet
- Ashley Byron – stage manager
- Brent Clark – mixing
- Andrew Crawford – technical director
- Erica Crocker – vocals
- Michael Cuthbertson – engineer
- Ned Davies – vocals
- Holly Dawson – vocals
- Timothy Dearmin – saxophone
- Tulele Faletolu – vocals
- Michael Farmer – drums
- Ian Fisher – bass
- Kylie Fisher – choir conductor
- Lucy Fisher – vocals
- Rolf Wam Fjell – drums
- Matthew Fordham – lighting assistant
- Joan Foster – stage manager
- Michelle Fragar – vocals
- Muchiri Gateri – assistant
- Craig Gower – keyboards, piano
- Peter Hart – vocals
- Scott Haslem – vocal producer, vocals
- Ian Hendrick – lighting assistant
- Nigel Hendroff – acoustic guitar, electric guitar
- Hillsong – primary artist
- Hillsong Church Worship and Creative Arts Team – arranger
- David Holmes – acoustic guitar, electric guitar
- Matthew Hope – brass director, trumpet
- Justin Hopkins – drum technician
- Trent Hopkinson – trumpet
- Karen Horn – vocals
- Bobbie Houston – executive producer
- Brian Houston – executive producer
- Joel Houston – producer
- Andrea Jackson – stage manager
- Peter James – keyboards
- John Kasinathan – trombone
- Peter D. Kelly – percussion
- Giles Lambert – design
- Stephanie Lambert – trumpet
- Cassandra Langton – event coordinator
- Garth Lazaro – vocals
- Jessica LeClerc – assistant
- Kevin Lee – keyboards, piano
- Natalie Locke – event coordinator
- Steve Luke – trombone
- Jamil Mannah – engineer, post production engineer
- Steve McPherson – vocal producer, vocals
- Rhonda Meyerowitz – event coordinator
- Reuben Morgan – acoustic guitar, producer, vocals
- Tony Mott – photography
- Luke Munns – drums
- Alistair Munro – monitor engineer
- Jonas Myrin – vocals
- Sam O'Donnell – drum technician
- Steve Ollis – choir conductor
- Paul Peipman - electric guitar
- Katrina Peoples – assistant, vocals
- Woody Pierson – vocals
- Aran Puddle – project coordinator
- Brett Randall – engineer
- Natalie Rudder – choir conductor
- Marty Sampson – acoustic guitar, keyboards, piano, vocals
- Joanna Savage – vocals
- Lisa Seymour – stage manager
- Mike Short – bass technician
- Reuben Singleton – flute
- Heather Skaret – stage manager
- Andrew Sloan – choir conductor, vocals
- Amanda Sorenson – engineer, post production engineer
- Matt Tennikoff – bass
- Catherine Thambiratnam – event coordinator
- Tim Tickner – assistant
- Dee Uluirewa – vocals
- Elisha Vella – percussion
- Peter Wallis – engineer, post production engineer
- Vanessa Watson – assistant
- Kevin Watts – monitor engineer
- Miriam Webster – vocal producer, vocals
- Martine Williams – choir conductor
- Darlene Zschech – producer, vocal producer, worship leader
