= List of Hillsong worship leaders =

Hillsong Church has produced hundreds of Christian songs on albums since 1992 on more than fifty albums, mostly under their own label, Hillsong Music. This is a list of Hillsong's notable worship leaders and musicians who have written, sung, and/or played instruments on one or more albums.

== Current worship leaders ==
=== Reuben Morgan ===
Morgan serves as Hillsong's worship pastor, replacing Darlene Zschech in 2008. Originally, alongside Marty Sampson, he was asked by Zschech to start a youth worship band for the church, which is now known as Hillsong United. He has written the majority of Hillsong's newer songs and is also the worship pastor at Hillsong London.

=== Joel Houston ===
Houston is one of the worship leaders at Hillsong. He is the eldest son of former Hillsong's Global Senior Pastors Brian and Bobbie Houston, and has been writing songs for Hillsong for many years. Originally he was a guitar player for Hillsong United and soon became United's Worship Leader after Reuben Morgan and Marty Sampson joined the main Hillsong Band. Houston currently serves as Hillsong's Creative Director and was the co-lead pastor of Hillsong New York City when it opened in October 2010.

== Previous worship leaders ==
=== Marty Sampson ===
Sampson was one of Hillsong's key musicians and songwriters. Alongside Reuben Morgan, he originally led Hillsong's youth band Hillsong United, and then led worship in the main Hillsong Band alongside Darlene Zschech and Morgan. He has led worship at two of Hillsong New York City's Focus Nights alongside the Hillsong team as well as sung and written new songs on Hillsong United's album Aftermath including singing on the title track. He helped lead worship at one of the many Hillsong extension services. As of 2019, he no longer publicly identifies as a Christian.

=== Darlene Zschech ===
Darlene Zschech is the former worship pastor (1995–2007) and the longest-serving member of Hillsong's worship team. She and her husband, Mark, became the new senior pastors of Hope Unlimited Church on the Central Coast of New South Wales. She continues, however, to be part of Hillsong Church and remains a key member of the church's senior leadership team alongside Hillsong's former senior pastors Brian and Bobbie Houston. Zschech continues to lead worship at key Hillsong events throughout the year, including being a part of the executive team for the Colour Your World Women's Conference and the annual Hillsong Conference, while also continuing to lead tours with the Hillsong Team around the world. She still remains the senior lead vocal on all of Hillsong's annual live albums and many other Hillsong songs, including Hillsong's single "It is Well with My Soul", a remake of the traditional hymn with all the proceeds going towards the victims of the 2011 Queensland Floods. Zschech also continues to host the Creative Worship stream at Hillsong Conference, and has written over 80 songs of praise and worship that have been published by Hillsong Music alone.

=== Geoff Bullock ===
Geoff Bullock wrote most of the songs on the earlier albums. He was the original worship pastor of Hillsong but was replaced by Darlene Zschech after he left Hillsong in the mid-1990s.

=== Miriam Webster ===
Miriam Webster has written many songs and has appeared on Hillsong albums since 1997. She has been featured as the lead vocal for several songs alongside Darlene Zschech. She relocated to minister in the United States but also sang in a medley of classic Hillsong songs at the 25th anniversary celebrations of Hillsong Conference.

=== Brooke Fraser Ligertwood ===
In recent years, Ligertwood has been a part of the Hillsong team after moving to Australia from New Zealand. She is also a famous New Zealand singer–songwriter, performing under her maiden name as Brooke Fraser. She has sung on both Hillsong Live albums alongside Darlene Zschech and as a part of Hillsong United with Joel Houston. Her song "What A Beautiful Name" won the Grammy award 2018 for "Best Contemporary Christian Music Performance/Song".

=== Taya Gaukrodger / TAYA (formerly Taya Smith) ===
Gaukrodger has been at Hillsong Church since the late 2000s to early 2010s. She started on Hillsong's youth band Hillsong Young & Free; then, she went on to sing on some Hillsong United albums and some Hillsong Worship albums.

As of September 2023 Gaukrodger is no longer a member of Hillsong church.

The iconic vocalist behind Hillsong United's "Oceans," left Hillsong Church in September 2023 to focus on her solo music career and family. She relocated to the United States and has since released solo albums and toured globally.

=== Aodhan King ===
Aodhan King is a Founding Member, key songwriter and worship leader of Hillsong Young & Free. He has also made numerous contributions to both Hillsong United and Hillsong Worship.

Aodhan King also revealed he was no longer part of Young & Free in May 2025.

== See also ==
- List of Hillsong albums
- List of Hillsong songs
