= Marty Sampson =

- Born: Martin W. Sampson; 31 May 1979 (age 47)
- Origin: Sydney, Australia
- Genres: Contemporary worship
- Occupations: Singer-songwriter; worship leader; musician
- Instruments: Vocals; guitar; piano; flute; drums
- Years active: 1998–2019
- Labels: Hillsong Music, Small City

Martin W "Marty" Sampson (born 31 May 1979) is an Australian singer-songwriter, musician, and former worship leader at Hillsong Church in Sydney. From the late 1990s until 2019 he was featured on the United Live albums and was one of the original Hillsong United band's worship leaders. He mainly is a guitarist although he also plays the piano, flute, and drums. Aside from work for Youth Alive and Hillsong United, Sampson has released solo albums.

== Biography ==
Sampson was born on 31 May 1979 and became a member of Hillsong Church in Sydney. From the late 1990s he was featured on the Youth Alive albums and was one of the original Hillsong United band's worship leaders. His last album with Hillsong United was 2011's Aftermath. He often led worship at the church and performed on Hillsong albums. Since his departure from Hillsong United, he has focused on songwriting. Sampson helped with the worship at Northern Beaches, a Hillsong extension church. In November 2006 he and Michelle married; they have a son.

In 2007, Sampson released a solo EP, Let Love Rule, via his official website. In April 2008, he co-wrote "We Give You Praise" with Delirious?, a Christian band from England. In 2010, he recorded an album in the United States under the band name, The Red Bikes. It was recorded with James Rudder as producer, Luke Munns on drums, Michael Guy Chislett on guitar, and Paul Malbury on bass guitar. The album has not been released. In June 2011, Sampson released another solo EP, Objects, as Martin Sampson. It is an acoustic guitar folk album in the vein of Bob Dylan. The tracks were recorded at the same time as The Red Bikes project.

On 10 August 2019, he publicly said that he was "losing his faith". Sampson initially clarified that he had not "renounced" his faith but was "struggling with many parts of the [Christian] belief system". On 23 August 2019, he said that he no longer identified as being a Christian.

== Discography ==
=== Songwriter ===
Songs written or co-written by Sampson include

Hillsong Worship albums

- By Your Side (1999)
  - "By Your Side"
- For This Cause (2000)
  - "Carry Me"
- You Are My World (2001)
  - "God Is Great"
  - "You Are My World"
  - "Forever"
  - "My Best Friend" with Joel Houston
- Blessed (2002)
  - "Now That You're Near"
  - "Son of God" with Lincoln Brewster
  - "King of Majesty"
- Hope (2003)
  - "Song of Freedom"
  - "Better Than Life"
  - "To the Ends of the Earth" with Houston
  - "Can't Stop Praising" with Tulele Faletolu
  - "Free"
  - "Angels"
- For All You've Done (2004)
  - "Hallelujah" with Jonas Myrin
  - "Home"
  - "Take All of Me"
- God He Reigns (2005)
  - "God He Reigns"
  - "All I Need Is You"
  - "There Is Nothing Like" with Myrin
  - "What the World Will Never Take" with Matt Crocker & Scott Ligertwood
  - "Tell the World" with Jonathon Douglass & Houston
- Mighty to Save (2006)
  - "Take It All" with Crocker & Ligertwood
  - "I Believe"
  - "The Freedom We Know" with Houston & Matt Tenikoff
  - "For Who You Are"
  - "Open My Eyes" with Mia Fieldes
- Saviour King (2007)
  - "In Your Freedom" with Raymond Badham
  - "One Thing" with Darlene Zschech
  - "Saviour King" with Fieldes
- Faith + Hope + Love (2009)
  - "The Wonder of Your Love" with Jack Mooring & Leeland Mooring
  - "His Glory Appears" with Zschech
- No Other Name (2014)
  - "Depths" with Brooke Fraser
- Open Heaven / River Wild (2015)
  - "O Praise the Name (Anástasis)" with Benjamin Hastings & Dean Ussher
  - "Open Heaven (River Wild)" with Matt Crocker
- Let There Be Light (2016)
  - "Look to the Son" with Joel Houston, Reuben Morgan, Matt Crocker, and Scott Ligertwood
  - "Elohim"
- The Peace Project (2017)
  - "Peace Upon The Earth" (music by Frederic Chopin)
- There Is More (2018)
  - "God so Loved" with Matt Crocker
  - "The Lord's Prayer" with Ben Fielding, Benjamin Hastings, and Reuben Morgan

Hillsong United albums

- Everyday (1999)
  - "Seeking You"
  - "Prayer to the King"
  - "God Is Moving"
- Best Friend (2000)
  - "Best Friend" with Houston
  - "Forever"
  - "Reason I Live"
- King of Majesty (2001)
  - "King of Majesty"
  - "Everything to Me"
  - "God Is Great"
- To the Ends of the Earth (2002)
  - "Free"
  - "All"
  - "To the Ends of the Earth" with Houston
  - "My God"
  - "Now That You're Near"
- More Than Life (2004)
  - "Light"
  - "Take All of Me"
  - "Shine for You"
  - "Soldier" with Faletolu
  - "All Day"
- Look to You (2005)
  - "Tell the World" with Douglass & Houston
  - "Look to You"
  - "All I Need Is You"
  - "Shout Unto God" with Houston
  - "There Is Nothing Like" with Myrin
  - "What the World Will Never Take" with Crocker & Ligertwood
  - "Deeper"
- United We Stand (2006)
  - "Take It All" with Crocker & Ligertwood
  - "From God Above"
  - "Came to My Rescue" with Joel Davies & Dylan Thomas
  - "Revolution" with Ligertwood, Houston, Brooke Fraser, & Michael Guy Chislett
  - "Hallelujah" with Tenikoff & Rolf Wam Fjell
- All of the Above (2007)
  - "Devotion"
  - "Saviour King" with Fieldes
- The I Heart Revolution: With Hearts as One (2008)
  - "Look to You"
  - "Forever"
  - "There Is Nothing Like" with Myrin
  - "Tell the World" with Douglass & Houston
  - "All I Need Is You"
  - "Shout Unto God" with Houston
  - "Came to My Rescue (Be Lifted High)" with Davies and Thomas
- Aftermath (2011)
  - "Light Will Shine" with Crocker
- People
  - "Ready Or Not" with Houston

Hillsong Young & Free albums

- "III" (2018)
  - "Jesus Loves Me" with Aodhán King and Benjamin Hastings

Hillsong Kids albums

- Jesus Is My Superhero (2004)
  - "King of Majesty"
- Super Strong God (2005)
  - "Free"
  - "All I Need Is You"
  - "Your Are My World"
- Supernatural (2006)
  - "Better Than Life"
  - "You're All I Need"
  - "For Who You Are"
- Can You Believe It!? (2018)
  - "My Best Friend" with Joel Houston

Youth Alive NSW albums

- Awake (2000)
  - "All Day"
  - "Follow You"
- Elevate (2001)
  - "All Day - Live"

Delirious? album

- Kingdom of Comfort (2008)
  - "We Give You Praise" with Martin Smith, Stuart Garrard, and Jon Thatcher

=== Extended plays ===
- Let Love Rule (EP, 2007)
  1. "Brave Souls"
  2. "NYC"
  3. "Landslide"
  4. "Inhale"
  5. "Heaven Sent"
  6. "Diamond Mine"
  7. "Exhale"
  8. "Castle Wall"
- Objects (EP, Small City Music, 17 June 2011)
  1. "Before the Night Takes Me"
  2. "Fast Asleep in the Sun"
  3. "Anybody Else"
  4. "From the Coal"
  5. "We Exist and Then We Fly Away"
