= Reuben Morgan =

Australian musician (born 1975)

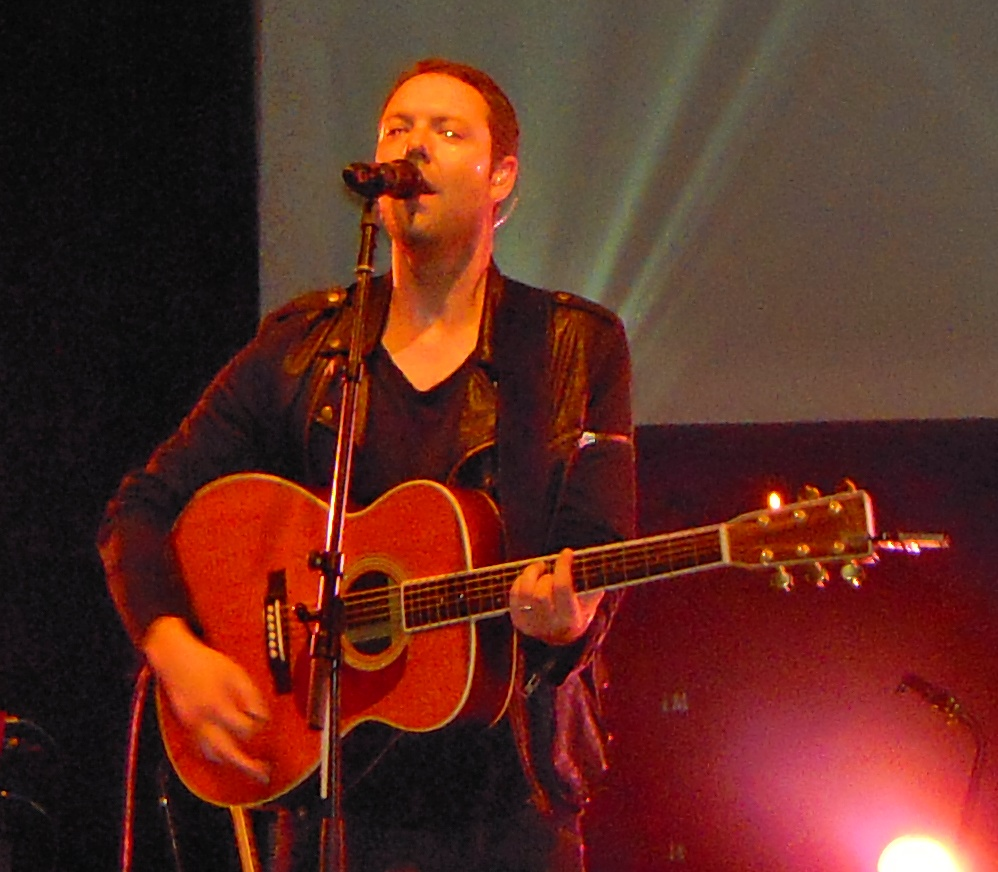
- Reuben leading worship in Australia

Background information
- Born: Reuben Timothy Morgan; 9 August 1975 (age 51)
- Genres: Contemporary worship music
- Occupation: Musician
- Instruments: Vocals; guitar
- Years active: 1996–present

Reuben Timothy Morgan (born 9 August 1975) is an Australian worship pastor at Hillsong Church and one of several worship leaders and songwriters in Hillsong Worship group. Prior to this he was a worship pastor at Hillsong Church in Sydney, Australia. He has written songs such as "Eagles Wings", "Hear Our Praises", "I Give You My Heart", "My Redeemer Lives" and "Mighty to Save", which won the Worship Song of the Year at the 40th GMA Dove Awards. In 2005 his first solo worship album, World Through Your Eyes, debuted at No. 3 in the Australian Christian Charts. As of at least 2025, he is no longer involved with Hillsong, but along with fellow former Hillsong vocalist Ben Fielding, started a band called Commons Worship.

== Biography ==
In 2005, Morgan signed with Rocketown Records. The company released his debut album in the United States, but four of the original songs were removed in favour of cover versions of Hillsong songs written by Morgan. In addition, the remaining songs were remixed and the resulting songs had a heavier feel when compared to the softer pop-rock originals.

Morgan has toured extensively around the United States, Canada and Europe. A 2007 European tour featured events in Scotland, England, Germany and Sweden. Everyone, contains Morgan's interpretation of his music and was mostly written in the previous 18 months, recorded in a big sounding, studio worship without the congregational elements found in the Hillsong Live albums. Everyone largely featured covers of previously released Hillsong songs written by Morgan and was released in Australia on 2 October 2006.

Morgan officially became Hillsong's new worship pastor in 2008, succeeding Darlene Zschech, however, Zschech continued to be a worship leader of the Hillsong Worship Team until 2012. On 29 June 2010, Hillsong Live released A Beautiful Exchange, an album featuring songs by Morgan. Morgan led Hillsong's 2010 tour of the United States, which kicked off on 21 July and included events in Dallas, Detroit and Los Angeles.

== Hillsong ==
Morgan's first songwriting contribution to Hillsong's live praise and worship albums was the song "I Give You My Heart", which was featured on the Hillsong live album God is in the House. Morgan himself, however, appeared but did not actually perform on the album, but was featured in the choir; the lead vocals for this performance were by Zschech and Steve McPherson. Morgan subsequently recorded his own version of "I Give You My Heart" for his first solo album, World Through Your Eyes.

Morgan made his first official performing appearance on Hillsong's next live album, All Things are Possible, playing acoustic guitar and contributing three original compositions to this album. One of these songs, "Shadow of Your Wings", was an outtake on the live audio recording, although it did appear on the video recording. Reuben performed co-lead vocals on the live recording of "Shadow of Your Wings" together with Zschech, although he was not credited as a vocalist for this album. His two other songwriting contributions to All Things are Possible were "In Your Hands" (this song was also featured in a "House of Cards" episode), which was sung by Rob Eastwood and Donia Makedonez; and "Your Love", which was sung by Miriam Webster and Lisa Young.

Over time Morgan would become a prolific songwriter for Hillsong. The next four Hillsong live albums (Touching Heaven Changing Earth, By Your Side, and You Are My World) featured songwriting contributions and acoustic guitars from Morgan, although he did not sing lead vocals on any of these recordings. His first official credit as a vocalist was on the album For This Cause. In Hillsong's 2002 live album, Blessed, the track "Most High" marked the first time Morgan contributed a lead vocal.

The song "Mighty to Save", from the 2006 Hillsong album of the same name, was written by Morgan and Ben Fielding, with lead vocals performed by Morgan. It was nominated for "Song of the Year" and won "Worship Song of the Year" at the 40th GMA Dove Awards.

== Personal life ==
He is married to Sarah and they have three children.

== Songs ==
Songs written or co-written by Morgan appear on the following albums:

- God Is in the House (1996)
  - "I Give You My Heart"
- All Things Are Possible (1997)
  - "In Your Hands"
  - "Your Love"
  - "Shadow of Your Wings" (outtake on audio album; was featured on video album)
- Touching Heaven Changing Earth (1998)
  - "Touching Heaven, Changing Earth"
  - "Lord Your Goodness"
  - "You Are Holy"
  - "You Gave Me Love"
- By Your Side (1999)
  - "My Redeemer Lives"
  - "Your Unfailing Love"
  - "What the Lord Has Done in Me"
  - "You Said"
  - "Eagles Wings"
  - "This Is How We Overcome"
- Everyday (1999)
  - "On the Lord's Day"
  - "More"
  - "Heaven"
- For This Cause (2000)
  - "One Day"
  - "Faith"
  - "You Are Near"
  - "Lifted Me High Again"
- Best Friend (2000)
  - "Jesus Generation"
- You Are My World (2001)
  - "Everything That Has Breath"
  - "Your Love Is Beautiful" with Raymond Badham, Steve McPherson, Nigel Hendroff
  - "God So Loved"
- King of Majesty (2001)
  - "Most High"
  - "I Adore"
- Blessed (2002)
  - "Blessed" with Darlene Zschech
  - "Through It All"
  - "I Adore"
  - "With You"
  - "Most High"
  - "All the Heavens"
- To the Ends of the Earth (2002)
  - "Need You Here"
  - "Glory"
- Hope (2003)
  - "Need You Here"
  - "Still"
  - "Glory"
  - "Highest"
- More Than Life (2003)
  - "Sing (Your Love)"
  - "More Than Life"
- For All You've Done (2004)
  - "For All You've Done"
  - "With All I Am"
  - "Sing (Your Love)"
  - "More Than Life"
  - "To You Alone"
- World Through Your Eyes (2004)
  - "Christ Divine" with Mia Fieldes
- God He Reigns (2005)
  - "Let Creation Sing"
  - "Emmanuel"
  - "Let Us Adore"
- Mighty to Save (2006)
  - "You Alone Are God" with Ben Fielding
  - "At The Cross" with Darlene Zschech
  - "Mighty to Save" with Fielding (winner of 'Worship Song of the Year' at 40th GMA Dove Awards)
- Everyone (2006)
  - "All for You" with Ben Fielding
- Saviour King (2007)
  - "You Are My Strength"
  - "You Saw Me" with Ben Fielding & Mia Fieldes
- The I Heart Revolution: With Hearts As One (2008)
  - "Mighty To Save" with Ben Fielding
  - "More Than Life"
- This Is Our God (2008)
  - "This Is Our God"
  - "Stronger" with Ben Fielding
  - "Across The Earth" with Matt Crocker & Mike Gulielmucci
  - "Where We Belong" with Joel Davies
- [a_CROSS//the_EARTH] :: Tear Down the Walls (2008)
  - "Freedom Is Here" with Scott Ligertwood
  - "You Hold Me Now" with Matt Crocker
- Faith + Hope + Love (2009)
  - "The First and The Last" with Joel Houston
  - "For Your Name" with Jad Gillies and Joel Houston
  - "Yahweh"
  - "We Will See Him" with Robert Fergusson
  - "You Hold Me Now" with Matt Crocker
- A Beautiful Exchange (2010)
  - "Open My Eyes" with Braden Lang
  - "Forever Reign" with Jason Ingram
  - "Greatness Of Our God" With Jason Ingram and Stu Garrard
  - "Believe" With Darlene Zschech
  - "Thank You" with Ben Fielding
- Aftermath (2011)
  - "Awakening" with Chris Tomlin
- God Is Able (2011)
  - "With Us" with Dylan Thomas
  - "God Is Able" with Ben Fielding
  - "Alive In Us" with Jason Ingram
  - "Awakening" with Chris Tomlin
  - "God In Everything" with Fielding
- Cornerstone (2012)
  - "Love Knows No End" with Ben Fielding and Harrison Wood
  - "Hope Of The World" with Jason Ingram and Matthew Bronleewee
  - "All My Hope" with Jason Ingram
  - "Love So High" with Matt Redman, Chris Tomlin, and Jason Ingram
  - "Stand In Awe" with Ben Fielding
  - "Cornerstone" with Edward Mote, Eric Liljero, and Jonas Myrin
- Glorious Ruins (2013)
  - "Christ Is Enough" with Jonas Myrin
  - "Closer" with Braden Lang, Jason Ingram & Joel Davies
  - "We Glorify Your Name" with Ed Cash, Jason Ingram, Matt Maher & Chris Tomlin
  - "You Crown The Year" with Brooke Ligertwood
  - "Lift You Higher" with Nait Masuku & Tekiva Ledwidge
- No Other Name (2014)
  - "Calvary" with Jonas Myrin and Mrs. Walter G. Taylor
  - "My Story" with Jarrad Rogers
- Open Heaven / River Wild (2015)
  - "Jesus I Need You" with Brooke Ligertwood, Scott Ligertwood and Jarrad Rogers
  - "In God We Trust" with Ben Fielding and Eric Liljero
- Let There Be Light (2016)
  - "Love So Great" with Joshua Grimmett and Jamie Snell
  - "Look to the Son" with Joel Houston, Marty Sampson, Matt Crocker and Scott Ligertwood
  - "I Will Boast in Christ" with Scott Ligertwood
- Moments: Mighty Sound (by Bethel Music, 2018)
  - "Cornerstone (Spontaneous)" performed alongside Brittany Mondesir
- There Is More (2018)
  - "Who You Say I Am" with Ben Fielding
  - "Be Still" with Ben Fielding
  - "The Lord's Prayer" with Ben Fielding, Benjamin Hastings and Marty Sampson
- Can You Believe It!? (2018)
  - "Who You Say I Am" with Ben Fielding

== See also ==
- Extravagant Worship: The Songs of Reuben Morgan
- Hillsong musicians
- List of Hillsong albums
- List of Hillsong songs
