= Hillsong Music (label) =

Australian Christian record label

- Parent company: Hillsong Church
- Founder: Darlene Zschech, Geoff Bullock, Reuben Morgan
- Distributors: Capitol CMG, Universal Music Group
- Genre: Contemporary worship music, contemporary Christian music
- Country of origin: Australia
- Location: Sydney
- Official website: hillsongmusic.com

Hillsong Music is Christian music produced by Hillsong Church in Sydney, Australia as well as offshoot churches, Hillsong London, and Hillsong Kyiv. Hillsong albums are released and distributed by Hillsong Music.

== History ==
Hillsong Church's popularity in Christian praise and worship music stems from the inauguration of the Hillsong Conference in 1986 and the first publication of choruses written by Hills CLC members, especially Darlene Zschech. It is in this context that Hillsong Music was founded in 1991. Their first live worship CD The Power of Your Love was released in 1992. Since then, live praise and worship albums have been produced each year. Other music series include the Worship series, United, Youth Alive, Hillsong Kids and Instrumental series. They have also released two Christmas albums and several compilation albums. "What a Beautiful Name" won the 2018 Grammy Award for Best Contemporary Christian Music Performance/Song.

== Popularity ==
Some Hillsong songs have distinct gospel influences. Hillsong Music titles regularly feature in the top 25 of most songs sung in all reporting countries recorded through the CCLI website. Christian Copyright Licensing International allows churches to use any listed music through a flat fee based on congregational size rather than buying access to individual songs, making recent music more affordable to churches all over the world.

People Just Like Us was the first Christian album to achieve gold status in Australia as well as the first to go Platinum. To date, all Hillsong live worship albums have achieved Gold status in Australia. In 1996, Hillsong Music reached international prominence with the release of Shout to the Lord produced by Integrity Music. This was Integrity Music's first live worship album featuring a female worship leader – Darlene Zschech.

The 2004 Hillsong live worship album For All You've Done, debuted at No. 1 on the Australian Record Industry Association album charts. There was some controversy about this outcome as almost all of the albums were sold at Hillsong's annual conference held in early July. The Australian Recording Industry Association (ARIA) has defended the outcome noting that the album sold more copies than any other record on sale in Australia that week. As of December 2011, Hillsong has sold more than 12 million records across the globe, following its first release in 1991 and a quarter of all contemporary songs heard in Australian churches in 2011 were written by Hillsong.

== Albums ==
Early albums were released solely on cassette and CD. Video recordings of the live albums have also been made for VHS since the second album in 1993, and additionally for DVD since 2000, with increasing additional content such as documentaries and extra songs.

=== Hillsong Worship (formerly known as Hillsong Live) ===
1. The Power of Your Love (1992)
2. Stone's Been Rolled Away (1993)
3. People Just Like Us (1994)
4. Friends in High Places (1995)
5. God Is in the House (1996)
6. All Things Are Possible (1997)
7. Touching Heaven Changing Earth (1998)
8. By Your Side (1999)
9. For This Cause (2000)
10. You Are My World (2001)
11. Blessed (2002)
12. Hope (2003)
13. For All You've Done (2004)
14. God He Reigns (2005)
15. Mighty to Save (2006)
16. Saviour King (2007)
17. This Is Our God (2008)
18. Faith + Hope + Love (2009)
19. A Beautiful Exchange (2010)
20. God is Able (2011)
21. Cornerstone (2012)
22. Glorious Ruins (2013)
23. No Other Name (2014)
24. Open Heaven / River Wild (2015)
25. Let There Be Light (2016)
26. The Peace Project (2017)
27. There Is More (2018)
28. Awake (2019)
29. Take Heart (Again) (2020)
30. These Same Skies (2021)
31. Team Night (2022)

=== Hillsong United ===
1. Everyday (1999)
2. Best Friend (2000)
3. King of Majesty (2001)
4. To the Ends of the Earth (2002)
5. More Than Life (2004)
6. Look to You (2005)
7. United We Stand (2006)
8. Unidos Permanecemos (2007)
9. All of the Above (2007)
10. In a Valley by the Sea (EP) (2007)
11. The I Heart Revolution. Part I: With Hearts as One (2008)
12. Across the Earth (2009)
13. Aftermath (2011)
14. Live in Miami (2012)
15. Zion (2013)
16. Oceans (EP) (2013)
17. Zion Acoustic Sessions (2013)
18. The White Album (Remix Project) (2014)
19. Empires (2015)
20. Of Dirt and Grace: Live from the Land (2016)
21. Wonder (2017)
22. People (2019)
23. People En Español (2019)
24. The People Tour: Live from Madison Square Garden (2021)
25. Are We There Yet? (2022)
26. Zion (X) (2023)

=== Hillsong Chapel ===
1. Yahweh (2010)
2. Forever Reign (2012)
3. A Call to Worship (2024)
4. Amazing Grace (2024)

=== Hillsong Young & Free ===
1. We Are Young & Free (2013)
2. This Is Living (EP) (2014)
3. The Remixes (EP) (2015)
4. Youth Revival (2016)
5. Youth Revival (acoustic) (2017)
6. III (2018)
7. III (Live at Hillsong Conference) (2018)
8. III (Studio Sessions) (2019)
9. III (Reimagined) (2019)
10. All of My Best Friends (2020)
11. Out Here On A Friday Where It Began (2021)
12. Out Here On A Friday (Acoustic) (2022)

=== Special singles ===
1. It Is Well with My Soul (Worship)
2. Vivo Estás (Young & Free)
3. The Stand (Young & Free)
4. Océanos (Donde Mis Pies Pueden Fallar) (UNITED)
5. Noel (Young & Free)
6. Peace Has Come (Worship)
7. Vida Tú Me Das (Young & Free)

=== Hillsong Kids ===
1. Jesus Is My Superhero (15 November 2004)
2. Super Strong God (1 November 2005)
3. Supernatural (1 December 2006)
4. Tell the World (8 December 2007)
5. Follow You (6 December 2008)
6. Ultimate Kids Collection (2009)
7. Can You Believe It!? (21 September 2018)
8. Never Walk Alone (2023)

=== Hillsong Kids Junior ===
1. Crazy Noise (2011)

=== Worship series ===
1. Simply Worship (1996)
2. Simply Worship 2 (1997)
3. Simply Worship 3 (1998)
4. Overwhelmed (2000)
5. Amazing Love (2002)
6. Faithful (2003)
7. Songs for Communion (2006)

=== Instrumental worship ===
1. The Secret Place (1999)
2. Forever (2003)

=== Christmas ===
1. Christmas (2001)
2. Celebrating Christmas (2005)
3. Born Is The King (2011)
4. We Have a Saviour (2012)
5. The Peace Project (2017)

=== Compilation ===
1. Hills Praise (1997)
2. Extravagant Worship: The Songs of Darlene Zschech (2002)
3. Extravagant Worship: The Songs of Reuben Morgan (2002)
4. The Platinum Collection Volume 1: Shout to the Lord (2000)
5. The Platinum Collection Volume 2: Shout to the Lord 2 (2003)
6. Ultimate Worship (2005)
7. Ultimate Collection Volume II (2008)
8. The Platinum Collection Volume 3: Shout to the Lord 3 (2009)
9. The Very Best of Hillsong LIVE (2010)
10. Ultimate Kids Collection (2009)
- Special edition that includes a special release of 'Look To You', 'United We Stand' and 'All of the Above'.

=== Other ===
1. Shout to the Lord (1996)
2. Shout to the Lord Special: Gold Edition (1996)
3. I Believe the Promise (1997)
4. Shout to the Lord 2000 (1998)
5. Hillsong" + Delirious? – UP: Unified Praise (2004)
6. God is Able EP (2012)
7. Cornerstone EP (2012)
8. Hillsong Global Project (2012)
9. Hillsong: Let Hope Rise - Original Motion Picture Soundtrack (2016)

=== Spanish ===
1. Unidos Permanecemos (2006)
2. Con Todo (2010)
3. En Mi Lugar (2011)
4. Global Project Español (2012)
5. Mi Roca (2013)
6. No Hay Otro Nombre (2014)
7. En Esto Creo (2015)
8. Ruido Alegre (2016)
9. El Eco De Su Voz (2017)
10. Hay Más (2019)
11. People En Español (2019)
12. Despertar (2020)
13. Todos Mis Mejores Amigos (2021)
14. El Mismo Poder (2022)
15. Algo Nuevo (2023)
16. Navidad: El Proyecto De Paz (2024)
17. El Gran YO SOY (2026)

=== Portuguese ===
1. Global Project Português (2012)
2. Quão Lindo Esse Nome (2018)
3. Quem Dizes Que Eu Sou (2019)
4. Rei Dos Reis (2020)
5. Sei Que Farás (2022)

=== Hillsong London ===
1. Shout God's Fame (2004)
2. Jesus Is (2006)
3. Jesus Is: Remix (2007)
4. Hail to the King (2008)

=== Hillsong Kiev ===
1. Пламя (Flame) (1995) - Studio worship
2. Мы будем славить (We Will Praise) (1997) – Live praise & worship
3. Это знает душа моя (That My Soul Knows) (1997) – Live praise & worship
4. Прыгай в небеса (Jump Up into Heaven) (1998) – Youth studio worship
5. С Богом возможно всё (All Things Are Possible with God) (1998) – Live praise & worship
6. План (Plan) (1999) – Youth live worship
7. Небеса на земле (Heaven on Earth) (2000) – Live praise & worship
8. Лучший Друг (Best Friend) (2001) – Live praise & worship
9. Революция (Revolution) (2001) – Youth live worship
10. Царь Величия (King of Majesty) (2002) – Live praise & worship
11. Пожар (Burn) (2004) – Youth live worship
12. Слава в вышних (Glory in the Highest) (2005) – Live praise & worship
13. Иисус мой Супергерой (Jesus Is My Superhero) (2005) – Kids series
14. Это мой дом (This Is My Home) (2006) – Live praise & worship
15. Спасение (Salvation) (2006) – Youth live worship
16. Суперcильный Бог (Super Strong God) (2006) – Kids series
17. Сверхъестественный Бог (Supernatural God) (2007) – Kids series
18. Господь всего (Lord of All) (2007) – Live praise & worship
19. Алтарь (Altar) (2008) – Live praise & worship
20. Это наш Царь (This is our King) (2009) – Live praise & worship
21. Бог Есть Любовь (God Is Love) (2010) – Live praise & worship
22. Неразделимы (Undivided) (2010) – Youth live worship
23. Всего мира свет (Light of the world) (2010) – Kids series
24. Ритм благодати (Rhythms of Grace) (2012) – Youth worship
25. Океаны (Oceans) (2014) - Live praise & worship
26. Нет Другого Имени (No Other Name) (2014) - EP
27. Открытые Небеса / Живая Вода (Open Heaven / River Wild) (2017) - EP
28. Да Будет Свет (Let There Be Light) (2017) - EP
29. Я Знаю Кто Я В Тебе (I Know Who I Am In You) (2019) - Studio worship

=== Stockholm Worship (Presented by Hillsong) ===
1. Other Side (2023) – Live worship album
2. Other Side Deluxe (2024)

== Music videos ==
Year	Title	Album	Source
2007	"Point of Difference"	All of the Above	featured in the DVD The I Heart Revolution: With Hearts As One.
2009	"Yours Forever"	[a_CROSS // the_EARTH] Tear Down The Walls	not made by Hillsong, made by 'MillionActsMovement'.
2010	"Go"	aftər,maθ	featured on Aftermath Deluxe Edition
2011	"Born Is the King (It's Christmas)"	Born Is The King	performed by Matt Crocker
2011	"Free As a Bee"	Crazy Noise	By Hillsong Kids Jr.
2011	"The Greatest Commandment"	Crazy Noise	by Hillsong Kids Jr.
2012	"We Have a Saviour"	We Have A Saviour	performed by: Ben Fielding
2013	"Heartbeats"	Zion	performed by: Matt Crocker [The Music Video Must Be Unlocked By The Fans, With 100.000 Views On Their Website, Now Available]
2013	"Relentless"	Zion	performed by: Matt Crocker
2013	"Love Is War"	Zion	performed by: Jad Gillies
2013	"Oceans (Where Feet May Fail)" Live at Colour Conference	Zion	performed by: Taya Smith
2014	"Scandal of Grace (Chad Howat Remix)"	The White Album - A Remix Project	performed by: Matt Crocker
2014	"Like An Avalanche (Eric Owyoung Remix)"	The White Album - A Remix Project	performed by: Jill McCloghry
2014	"With Everything (Tim Yagolnikov Remix)"	The White Album - A Remix Project	performed by: Jad Gillies & Joel Houston
2014	"Alive"	We Are Young & Free	performed by: Alexander Pappas
2014	"Wake"	We Are Young & Free	performed by: Taya Smith
2014	"Back To Life"	We Are Young & Free	performed by: Melodie Wagner
2014	"Gracious Tempest" Live From Youth	We Are Young & Free	performed by: Taya Smith (New Version)
2015	"This Is Living" (featuring Lecrae)	This Is Living EP	performed by: Aodhan King

== See also ==
- List of Hillsong worship leaders
- List of Hillsong songs
