= Miriam Webster =

Australian Pentecostal worship leader and contemporary singer/songwriter

Miriam Webster Sobel is an Australian Pentecostal worship leader and contemporary singer/songwriter. She is most well known for her classical worship songs with Hillsong Music Australia. Miriam won A.C.E State Student music award as a teenager for singing at the convention in Queensland, Australia. While staying in Sydney in 1996 she joined her friend who attended Hills Christian Life Centre which is known today as Hillsong Church to go to a Friday night youth service. Miriam was asked to sing this night as they were looking for an item so she sang a song she had penned years before called 'Fall upon your knees'. She joined the worship team months later and from there she has led worship in services, rallies, connect groups and conferences. She has toured Australia, New Zealand, Asia and the United States, and recently released her solo album Made Me Glad.

She served with the Hillsong Church in Sydney from 1996 to 2007 and was featured on numerous Hillsong Music praise-and-worship albums since 1997. Among her notable congregational songs are "Dwelling Places", "Made Me Glad", "Welcome In This Place" and "You Are Faithful". Webster also led worship with Steve Mcpherson and Darlene Zschech at the 25th Hillsong Conference Classic Medlies.

She is currently married to messianic rabbi Jason Sobel, and they live in the United States.

== List of songs by Webster ==
- It is He
- Most Holy
- Do what you say
- Til I see your face
- Fall upon your knees
- Angel of the Lord
- Dwelling Places
- You are faithful
- Made me glad
- Exceeding Joy
- What the Lord has done in me
- I will love
- The only name (co-write with Darlene Zschech)
- All you are (co-write with Jonas Myrin)
- Dedication
- Jesus won it all
- Welcome in this place
- Mercies
- Loving Kindness
- Praise Him
- Draw Near
- Marvelous
- Greater
- Never Alone
- Who will stand
- Glory to Jesus
- Loving Kindness
- Draw Near
- Love overflows
- Rescued me
