= List of Hillsong songs =

The Hillsong Church started in Australia and from there spread as a Pentecostal movement. Since they started releasing recordings in 1992, they have published and recorded hundreds of songs on over 50 albums, mostly under their own label, Hillsong Music.

Below is a list of songs arranged alphabetically by title. Italicised song titles indicate an instrumental recording. Italicised album names indicate an instrumental album. A number in brackets after the song title means that there have been different songs with the same name. If a particular song is on more than one album, all albums are listed alphabetically. A number in brackets after the album name indicates the version number of that song in chronological order. If they are the same number, it means they are the same recording.

Note: Songs from the (non-English) Hillsong Ukraine albums are not listed.

== A ==
Title	Author	Album	Track
Awake My Soul	Brooke Ligertwood	Awake (2019)	2
A Million Suns	Scott Ligertwood; Dean Ussher	Zion	11
Abba, Father	Darlene Zschech	Overwhelmed	12
Above All	Paul Nevison	Jesus Is (1)	12
Above All	Paul Nevison	Jesus Is: Remix (2)	8
Across the Earth	Reuben Morgan; Matt Crocker; Mike Guglielmucci	This Is Our God	11
Adonai	Ray Badhamn; Mia Fieldes	Mighty to Save	Paul Andrew 9
Aftermath	Joel Houston	Aftermath	5
All Things New (Live)	Ben Fielding and Dean Ussher	No Other Name	8
All Things New (Alternate Version) [Live]	Ben Fielding and Dean Ussher	No Other Name	16
Alive (1)	Gio Galanti; Natasha Bedingfield; Jonas Myrin	Jesus Is My Superhero	8
Alive (2)	Alexander Pappas; Aodhán King	We Are Young and Free	2
Alive (Studio Version)	Alexander Pappas; Aodhán King	We Are Young and Free	13
Alive in Us	Reuben Morgan; Jason Ingram	God Is Able	8
All About You	Joel Houston	To the Ends of the Earth (1)	2
All About You	Joel Houston	To the Ends of the Earth (2)	13
All Day	Marty Sampson	Awake (1) (2000)	4
All Day	Marty Sampson	More Than Life (2)	15
All Day	Marty Sampson	The I Heart Revolution (3)	14 (CD 1)
All for Love	Mia Fieldes	God He Reigns (2)	2 (CD 2)
All for Love	Mia Fieldes	Look to You	5
All I Do	Gio Galanti; Natasha Bedingfield	Blessed	10
All I Need Is You	Marty Sampson	Look to You (1)	4
All I Need Is You	Marty Sampson	God He Reigns (2)	7 (CD 1 ) (tag; chorus)
All I Need Is You	Marty Sampson	Super Strong God (3)	13 (medley; chorus)
All I Need Is You	Marty Sampson	The I Heart Revolution (4)	3 (CD 2)
All I Really Want	Leah Cooney	Awake (2000)	9
All My Hope	Reuben Morgan; Jason Ingram	Cornerstone	6
All of My Days	Mark Stevens	You Are My World	3
All Praises to the King	Andy Wallis	Faithful	7
All the Days of My Life	Russell Fragar	Simply Worship 2	8
All the Heavens	Reuben Morgan	Blessed (1)	14
All the Heavens	Reuben Morgan	Ultimate Worship (1)	14
All Things Are Possible	Darlene Zschech	All Things Are Possible (1)	?
All Things Are Possible	Darlene Zschech	All Things Are Possible (2)	15
All Things Are Possible	Darlene Zschech	Extravagant Worship: The Songs of Darlene Zschech (4)	1 (CD 2)
All Things Are Possible	Darlene Zschech	I Believe the Promise (3)	6
All Things Are Possible	Darlene Zschech	Shout to the Lord 2000 (4)	4
All Things Are Possible	Darlene Zschech	The Platinum Collection Volume 1: Shout to the Lord (1)	1 (CD 2)
All This Future	Joel Houston	Are We There Yet?	2
All You Are	Miriam Webster	Extravagant Worship: The Songs of Miriam Webster	4
Always	Mia Fieldes	More Than Life	7
Always Forever	Kate Spence	One	5
Always Singing Your Praise	Darlene Zschech	Jump to the Jam	13
Always Will	Jay Cook; Jarred Rogers; Jamie Snell	Glorious Ruins	2
Always Will (Intro)		Glorious Ruins	1
Am I to Believe	Joel Houston	To the Ends of the Earth	12
Amazing Love	Michelle Fragar	Amazing Love	12
Anchor	Ben Fielding; Dean Ussher	Glorious Ruins	13
And That My Soul Knows Very Well	Darlene Zschech; Russell Fragar	Chosen One (2)	9
And That My Soul Knows Very Well	Darlene Zschech; Russell Fragar	Extravagant Worship: The Songs of Darlene Zschech (1)	3 (CD 1)
And That My Soul Knows Very Well	Darlene Zschech; Russell Fragar	God Is in the House (1)	5
And That My Soul Knows Very Well	Darlene Zschech; Russell Fragar	I Believe the Promise (3)	10
And That My Soul Knows Very Well	Darlene Zschech; Russell Fragar	Simply Worship 2 (1)	1
And That My Soul Knows Very Well	Darlene Zschech; Russell Fragar	The Platinum Collection Volume 1: Shout to the Lord (1)	10 (CD 2)
Angel of the Lord	Miriam Webster	Faithful (1)	4
Angel of the Lord	Miriam Webster	Extravagant Worship: The Songs of Miriam Webster (2)	2
Angels	Marty Sampson	Hope	7 (CD 1)
Angels We Have Heard on High / Gloria	traditional; arranged by: Luke Munns / Reuben Morgan	Celebrating Christmas	1
Anthem of Praise	David Wakerley; Beci Wakerley	Jesus Is My Superhero	7
Anything (for You)	Reuben Morgan	The Plan	5
Are You Hungry	Kate Spence	The Plan	3
Arms Open Wide	Sam Knock	Tear Down the Walls (1)	10
Arise (Bonus)	Ryan Taubert; Steven Robertson	Zion (Deluxe Edition)	1
At the Cross	Reuben Morgan; Darlene Zschech	Mighty to Save (1)	5
At the Cross	Reuben Morgan; Darlene Zschech	Ultimate Collection Volume II (1)	14
Awakening	Reuben Morgan; Chris Tomlin	Aftermath	12
Awakening	Reuben Morgan; Chris Tomlin	God Is Able (Deluxe Edition)	13
Away in a Manger	traditional; arranged by: Russell Fragar	Christmas	6
Awesome God	Rich Mullins	Look to You	13
Awesome in this Place	Ned Davies	For This Cause (1)	3
Awesome in this Place	Ned Davies	The Platinum Collection Volume 2: Shout to the Lord 2 (1)	2 (CD 2)

== B ==
Title	Author	Album	Track
Bright as the Sun	Joel Houston	Awake (2019)	10
Back to Life	Joel Davies and Aodhán King	We Are Young and Free	9
Beautiful Exchange	Joel Houston	A Beautiful Exchange	11
Because of Your Love	Russell Fragar	Friends in High Places	10
Before the Throne	Russell Fragar	All Things Are Possible	8
"Behold (Then Sings My Soul)"	Joel Houston	Let There Be Light	1
Believe (1)	Donna Lasit	For This Cause	13
Believe (2)	Reuben Morgan; Darlene Zschech	A Beautiful Exchange	10
Beneath The Waters (I Will Rise)	Brooke Ligertwood; Scott Ligertwood	Cornerstone	2
Better Than Life	Marty Sampson	Hope (1)	1 (CD 1)
Better Than Life	Marty Sampson	Ultimate Worship (1)	7
Bless the Lord	Kate Spence	Awake (2000)	8
Blessed	Darlene Zschech; Reuben Morgan	Blessed (1)	1
Blessed	Darlene Zschech; Reuben Morgan	Jesus Is My Superhero (2)	5
Blessed	Darlene Zschech; Reuben Morgan	The Platinum Collection Volume 2: Shout to the Lord 2 (1)	12 (CD 1)
Blessed Be	Geoff Bullock	The Power of Your Love	5
Blown Away	Aodhán King Joel Houston Matt Crocker	Are We There Yet?	9
Break Free	Joel Houston; Matt Crocker; Scott Ligertwood	All of the Above (1)	2
Break Free	Joel Houston; Matt Crocker; Scott Ligertwood	Saviour King (2)	2
Break Free	Joel Houston; Matt Crocker; Scott Ligertwood	The I Heart Revolution: With Hearts as One (3)	8 (CD 1)
Break Free	Joel Houston; Matt Crocker; Scott Ligertwood	In a Valley by the Sea	7
Bones	Jill McCloghry; Joel Houston	Aftermath	7
Breathe	Kylie Fisher	Jesus Is My Superhero	11
Breathe on Me	Lucy Fisher	Shout to the Lord 2000 (1)	6
Breathe on Me	Lucy Fisher	The Platinum Collection Volume 2: Shout to the Lord 2 (1)	10 (CD 2)
Brighter	Aodhán King, Ben Tan and Melodie Wagner	We Are Young and Free	1
Broken Vessels (Amazing Grace) [Live]	Joel Houston and Jonas Myrin	No Other Name	3
By Your Side	Marty Sampson	By Your Side	8

== C ==
Title	Author	Album	Track
Came to My Rescue	Marty Sampson; Dylan Thomas; Joel Davies	Ultimate Collection Volume II (1)	9
Came to My Rescue	Marty Sampson; Dylan Thomas; Joel Davies	United We Stand (1)	6
Came to My Rescue	Marty Sampson; Dylan Thomas; Joel Davies	The I Heart Revolution (2)	14 (CD 2) (chorus)
Calvary (Live)	Mrs. Walter G. Taylor, Reuben Morgan and Jonas Myrin	No Other Name	6
Calvary (Alternate Version)	Mrs. Walter G. Taylor, Reuben Morgan and Jonas Myrin	No Other Name	14
Can't Stop Praising	Tulele Faletolu; Marty Sampson	Hope	8 (CD 1)
Can't Stop Talking	Russell Fragar	All Things Are Possible (1)	9
Can't Stop Talking	Russell Fragar	Hills Praise (1)	9
Can't Stop Talking	Russell Fragar	My Redeemer Lives (2)	2
Can't Stop Talking	Russell Fragar	Shout to the Lord 2000 (2)	1
Can't Stop Talking	Russell Fragar	The Platinum Collection Volume 1: Shout to the Lord (1)	16 (CD 2)
Can You Hear?	David Andrew; Mia Fieldes	Celebrating Christmas	11
Captain	Benjamin Hastings; Seth Simmons	Empires	11
Carry Me	Marty Sampson	Forever (2)	1
Carry Me	Marty Sampson	For This Cause (1)	7
Carry Me	Marty Sampson	Shout God's Fame (3)	10 (medley)
Centre of My Life	Jonas Myrin; Natasha Bedingfield	Shout God's Fame	6
Children of The Light	Joel Houston	Cornerstone	9
Christ Is Enough	Reuben Morgan; Jonas Myrin	Glorious Ruins	4
Christmas Time Again	Barry Southgate	Celebrating Christmas	3
Chariot	Benjamin Williams Dylan Thomas Joel Houston Wallace Willis	Are We There Yet?	15
Chosen As Mine	Joanna Haverkamp	Faithful	2
Chosen One	Paul Iannuzzelli	Chosen One	4
Church on Fire	Russell Fragar	The Platinum Collection Volume 1: Shout to the Lord (1)	4 (CD 1)
Church on Fire	Russell Fragar	Touching Heaven Changing Earth (1)	3
Close	Aodhán King and Dean Ussher	We Are Young and Free	5
Closer	Joel Davies; Jason Ingram; Braden Lang; Reuben Morgan	Glorious Ruins	6
Closer Than You Know	Joel Houston; Matt Crocker; Michael Guy Chislett	Empires	12
Come Alive	Benjamin Hastings, Michael Fatkin, Scott Ligertwood	Awake (2019)	3
Come to Me	Luke-Henri Peipman	Forever	9
Consuming Fire	Tim Hughes	More Than Life	10
Cornerstone	Edward Mote; Eric Liljero; Jonas Myrin; Reuben Morgan	Cornerstone	3
Cornerstone	Edward Mote; Eric Liljero; Jonas Myrin; Reuben Morgan	O Praise the Name (Anástasis)	3
Cry Of The Broken	Darlene Zschech	God Is Able	11
Cure	Kate Spence; Michael Neal; Lucas Parry	One	2

== D ==
Title	Author	Album	Track
Dawn	Brooke Ligertwood	Awake (2019)	1
Days Like These (TRUST U)	Joel Houston	Are We There Yet?	1
Dedication	Miriam Webster	Extravagant Worship: The Songs of Miriam Webster	8
Deeper (1)	Kate Spence	Awake (2000)	5
Deeper (2)	Marty Sampson	Look to You	10
Deeper Water	Aodhán King Benjamin Hastings Dan McMurray Dylan Thomas Joel Houston	Are We There Yet?	3
Deeply in Love	Kate Spence	One	7
Delightful (The Sower Never Wastes A Tear)	Joel Houston	Are We There Yet?	6
Desert Song	Brooke Fraser	This Is Our God	3
Desert Song	Brooke Fraser	Tear Down the Walls	5
Depths (Live)	Brooke Ligertwood and Marty Sampson	No Other Name	5
Desperate People	Joel Houston; Michael Guy Chislett	All of the Above	3
Devoted	Martyn Layzell	Awake (2000)	7
Devotion	Marty Sampson	All of the Above	4
Did You Feel the Mountains Tremble?	Martin Smith	King of Majesty (1)	11
Did You Feel the Mountains Tremble?	Martin Smith	UP: Unified Praise (2)	7
Did You Know?	Brittany Grey	Jesus Is My Superhero	13
The Difference	Joel Davies; Ben Fielding	God Is Able	6
Do What You Say	Miriam Webster	Amazing Love	7
Draw Me Closer	Dean Ussher	All of the Above	5
Dwell in Your House	Paul Ewing	For This Cause	4
Dwelling Places	Miriam Webster	By Your Side (1)	5
Dwelling Places	Miriam Webster	Extravagant Worship: The Songs of Miriam Webster (3)	3
Dwelling Places	Miriam Webster	The Platinum Collection Volume 1: Shout to the Lord (1)	13 (CD 1)
Dwelling Places	Miriam Webster	The Secret Place (2)	5

== E ==
Title	Author	Album	Track
Eagle's Wings	Reuben Morgan	By Your Side (1)	12
Eagle's Wings	Reuben Morgan	Extravagant Worship: The Songs of Reuben Morgan (2)	4 (CD 1)
Eagle's Wings	Reuben Morgan	Shout God's Fame (4)	10 (medley)
Eagle's Wings	Reuben Morgan	Shout to the Lord 2000 (2)	15
Eagle's Wings	Reuben Morgan	The Platinum Collection Volume 1: Shout to the Lord (1)	9 (CD 2)
Eagle's Wings	Reuben Morgan	The Secret Place (3)	7
Emmanuel (1)	Raymond Badham	Celebrating Christmas (2)	9
Emmanuel (1)	Raymond Badham	The Platinum Collection Volume 2: Shout to the Lord 2 (1)	3 (CD 1)
Emmanuel (1)	Raymond Badham	You Are My World (1)	4
Emmanuel (2)	Reuben Morgan	God He Reigns	4 (CD 1)
Embers	Hannah Hobbs and Ben Tan	We Are Young and Free	11
Empires	Joel Houston; Dylan Thomas; Chris Davenport; Ben Tennikoff	Empires	9
Endless Light	Dean Ussher; Karl Cashwell	Cornerstone	3
End of Days	Bede Benjamin-Korporaal and Alexander Pappas	We Are Young and Free	8
Energy	Melodie Wagner; Michael Fatkin	This Is Living	2
Even When It Hurts (Praise Song)	Joel Houston	Empires	7
Ever Living God	Raymond Badham	Hope	3 (CD 1)
Evermore	Joel Houston	For All You've Done (2)	3 (CD 1)
Evermore	Joel Houston	More Than Life (1)	3
Every Time	Tanya Riches	Amazing Love	2
Everyday	Joel Houston	For This Cause (2)	14
Everyday	Joel Houston	The Platinum Collection Volume 2: Shout to the Lord 2 (2)	9 (CD 1)
Everyday	Joel Houston	Everyday (1)	1
Everyday	Joel Houston	Ultimate Worship (3)	11
Everyday	Joel Houston	UP: Unified Praise (3)	1
Everything that has Breath	Reuben Morgan	You Are My World	8
Everything to Me	Marty Sampson	King of Majesty	3
Exceeding Joy	Miriam Webster	Hope	3 (CD 2)
Exist	Paul Denham	One	1

== F ==
Title	Author	Album	Track
Face to Face	Hannah Hobbs; Laura Toggs; Michael Fatkin	Youth Revival	4
Faith (1)	Geoff Bullock	People Just Like Us	14
Faith (2)	Reuben Morgan	Extravagant Worship: The Songs of Reuben Morgan (1)	3 (CD 2)
Faith (2)	Reuben Morgan	For This Cause (1)	2
Faith (2)	Reuben Morgan	The Platinum Collection Volume 2: Shout to the Lord 2 (1)	8 (CD 1)
Faithful	Raymond Badham	Amazing Love	5
Faithful to the End	Reuben Morgan	Faithful	9
Faithfulness	Chris Davenport	Open Heaven / River Wild	11
Fall	Rebecca Mesiti	King of Majesty	6
Fall Upon Your Knees	Miriam Webster	Simply Worship 2	10
Falling into You	Aodhán King; Benjamin Hastings; Ben Tan; Cameron Robertson; Tracy Pratt	Youth Revival	9
Father (1)	Ned Davies	Amazing Love	1
Father (2)	Joel Houston	Aftermath	8
Father, I	Jonathon Douglass	To the Ends of the Earth	9
Father of Creation	Robert Eastwood	Shout to the Lord (1)	11
Father of Creation	Robert Eastwood	Simply Worship (1)	9
Father of Lights	Russell Fragar	Hills Praise (1)	4
Father of Lights	Russell Fragar	People Just Like Us (1)	3
The Father's Heart	Jorim Kelly; Gio Galanti	A Beautiful Exchange	7
Fill My Heart	Simon Refalo	The Plan	7
Fire	Katya Linedale	Chosen One	7
Fire Fall Down	Matt Crocker	United We Stand	10
The First and The Last	Joel Houston	Faith + Hope + Love	1
The First Noel	traditional: arranged by: Peter King	Christmas	11
Follow the Son	Gio Galanti; Jay Cook	Jesus Is (1)	4
Follow the Son	Gio Galanti; Jay Cook	Jesus Is: Remix (2)	5
Follow You	Marty Sampson	Awake	12
For All Who Are To Come	Michael Guy Chislett	All of the Above	9
For All You've Done	Reuben Morgan	For All You've Done (1)	1 (CD 1)
For All You've Done	Reuben Morgan	Ultimate Collection Volume II (1)	12
For The Lord Is Good	Reuben Morgan	Overwhelmed	11
For This Cause	Joel Houston	For This Cause (1)	10
For This Cause	Joel Houston	Shout God's Fame (2)	10 (medley)
For This Cause	Joel Houston	The Platinum Collection Volume 2: Shout to the Lord 2 (1)	10 (CD 1)
For Your Name	Jad Gillies; Joel Houston; Reuben Morgan	Faith + Hope + Love	2
Forever	Marty Sampson	Forever (3)	2
Forever	Marty Sampson	Best Friend (1)	4
Forever	Marty Sampson	The I Heart Revolution (4)	11 (CD 1)
Forever	Marty Sampson	You Are My World (2)	12
Forever and a Day	Raymond Badham	For All You've Done	1 (CD 2)
For Who You Are	Marty Sampson	Mighty to Save (1)	3
For Who You Are	Marty Sampson	Ultimate Collection Volume II (1)	13
Forever Reign	Jason Ingram; Reuben Morgan	A Beautiful Exchange	3
Forever Reign (Radio Version)	Jason Ingram; Reuben Morgan	A Beautiful Exchange	13
Found	Dave George	Mighty to Save (1)	7
Found	Dave George	All of the Above (2)	7
Free	Marty Sampson	Hope (2)	6 (CD 2)
Free	Marty Sampson	Super Strong God (4)	11
Free	Marty Sampson	To the Ends of the Earth (1)	3
Free	Marty Sampson	UP: Unified Praise (3)	2
Freedom Is Here	Reuben Morgan; Scott Ligertwood	Tear Down the Walls	1
The Freedom We Know	Joel Houston; Matt Tennikoff; Marty Sampson	Mighty to Save (1)	2
The Freedom We Know	Joel Houston; Matt Tennikoff; Marty Sampson	Ultimate Collection Volume II (1)	2
Free to Dance	Darlene Zschech	By Your Side	13
Friends in High Places	Russell Fragar	Friends in High Places (1)	1
Friends in High Places	Russell Fragar	Shout to the Lord 2000 (2)	2
From God Above	Marty Sampson	United We Stand	4
From the Inside Out	Joel Houston	Mighty to Save (2)	6
From the Inside Out	Joel Houston	The I Heart Revolution (3)	13 (CD 2)
From the Inside Out	Joel Houston	Ultimate Collection Volume II (1)	3
From the Inside Out	Joel Houston	United We Stand (1)	5
From Whom All Blessings Flow (Doxology)	Brooke Ligertwood, Chris Davenport, Scott Ligertwood	Awake	8

== G ==
Title	Author	Album	Track
Get Up and Dance	Sam Knock; Andy Wallis; Drew Wikeepa	Jesus Is My Superhero	10
Gift of Love	Amanda Fergusson	Songs for Communion	4
Give It Up	Wayne Davis	Jump to the Jam	5
Glorified	Steve McPherson	Touching Heaven Changing Earth	10
Glorify Your Name	Darlene Zschech; David Holmes	For All You've Done	6 (CD 2)
Glorious	Darlene Zschech	Extravagant Worship: The Songs of Darlene Zschech	1 (CD 1)
Glorious Ruins	Matt Crocker; Joel Houston	Glorious Ruins	6
Glory (1)	Geoff Bullock	The Power of Your Love	14
Glory (2)	Reuben Morgan	Hope (2)	2 (CD 1)
Glory (2)	Reuben Morgan	To the Ends of the Earth (1)	8
Glory (2)	Reuben Morgan	Ultimate Worship	3
Glory to God	Reuben Morgan	Christmas (1)	14
Glory to God	Reuben Morgan	Extravagant Worship: The Songs of Reuben Morgan (1)	8 (CD 2)
Glory to the King	Darlene Zschech	All Things Are Possible (1)	12
Glory to the King	Darlene Zschech	Extravagant Worship: The Songs of Darlene Zschech (3)	2 (CD 1)
Glory to the King	Darlene Zschech	I Believe the Promise (2)	8
Glory to the King	Darlene Zschech	Shout to the Lord 2000 (3)	14
Glory to the King	Darlene Zschech	The Platinum Collection Volume 2: Shout to the Lord 2 (1)	5 (CD 2)
Glow	Matt Crocker; Joel Houston	Faith + Hope + Love	3
Go	Matt Crocker	Aftermath	2
Go	Matt Crocker	God Is Able (Deluxe Edition)	12
God Has All the Grace and the Power	David Evans	Jump to the Jam	2
God He Reigns	Marty Sampson	God He Reigns (1)	7 (CD 1)
God He Reigns	Marty Sampson	Ultimate Collection Volume II (1)	16
God Is Able	Reuben Morgan; Ben Fielding	God Is Able	5
God Is Good	Alvin Slaughter	Shout to the Lord 2000	12
God Is Great	Marty Sampson	The Platinum Collection Volume 2: Shout to the Lord 2 (1)	8 (CD 2)
God Is Great	Marty Sampson	King of Majesty (2)	7
God Is Great	Marty Sampson	You Are My World (1)	2
God Is in the House	Russell Fragar; Darlene Zschech	God Is in the House (1)	1
God Is in the House	Russell Fragar; Darlene Zschech	God Is in the House (2)	15
God Is in the House	Russell Fragar; Darlene Zschech	Hills Praise (1)	8
God Is in the House	Russell Fragar; Darlene Zschech	Shout to the Lord 2000 (3)	3
God Is in the House	Russell Fragar; Darlene Zschech	The Platinum Collection Volume 1: Shout to the Lord (1)	4 (CD 2)
God Is Moving	Marty Sampson	Everyday	10
God Made the World	Paul Denham	The Plan	8
God of Ages	Ben Fielding	Saviour King	8
God of All Creation	Mark Stevens; Paul Iannuzzelli	Best Friend	5
God One and Only	Jonathon Douglass; Sam Knock	Faith + Hope + Love	8
God So Loved	Reuben Morgan	You Are My World	9
God Song	Hannah Hobbs Benjamin Hastings Joel Houston	Are We There Yet?	7
Godly Vibe	Dominic Kelsall; Greg Griffiths; Paul Denham	One	8
God Rest Ye Merry Gentlemen	traditional; arranged by: Ross Irwin	Celebrating Christmas	7
God Who Saves	Sam Knock	Glorious Ruins	8
God You Make Me Smile	Julia A'Bell	Super Strong God	5
Gonna Be Alright	Gio Galanti; Jonas Myrin	Shout God's Fame	3
Good Grace	Joel Houston	People	11
Gotta Get More	Paul Denham	One	9
Grace	David Moyse; Paul Iannuzzelli	Overwhelmed	8
Grace Abounds	Ben Fielding; Dean Ussher	Cornerstone	7
Grace to Grace	Chris Davenport; Joel Houston	Grace to Grace – Single	Single
Gracious Tempest	Matt Crocker, Marty Sampson and Ben Tan	We Are Young and Free	7
The Great Southland	Geoff Bullock	The Platinum Collection Volume 1: Shout to the Lord (1)	14 (CD 1)
The Great Southland	Geoff Bullock	The Power of Your Love (1)	16
Greater Than All	Autumn Hardman; Dave Hodgson	Cornerstone	12
Greatest Gift	Matt Redman; Peter Wilson	Jesus Is	10
The Greatest Gift	Matt Redman; Peter Wilson	Jesus Is: Remix	9
The Greatness of our God	Jason Ingram; Stu Garrad; Reuben Morgan	A Beautiful Exchange	6
Great in Power	Russell Fragar	By Your Side (1)	2
Great in Power	Russell Fragar	The Platinum Collection Volume 2: Shout to the Lord 2 (1)	3 (CD 2)
Great Is the Lord	Nigel Hendroff	Amazing Love	4

== H ==
Title	Author	Album	Track
He Shall Reign	Ben Fielding, Reuben Morgan	Awake	12
Hallelujah (1)	Darlene Zschech	Christmas	13
Hallelujah (2)	Marty Sampson; Jonas Myrin	For All You've Done (1)	6 (CD 1)
Hallelujah (2)	Marty Sampson; Jonas Myrin	Ultimate Collection Volume II (1)	7
Hallelujah (3)	Matt Tennikoff; Rolf Wam Fjell; Marty Sampson	United We Stand	17
Hark the Herald Angels Sing	traditional; arranged by: Peter King / Luke-Henri Peipman; Steve McPherson	Celebrating Christmas (2)	8
Hark the Herald Angels Sing	traditional; arranged by: Peter King / Luke-Henri Peipman; Steve McPherson	Christmas	2
Have Mercy On Me Now	Chris Davenport Joel Houston	Are We There Yet?	8
Have Faith in God	Geoff Bullock	People Just Like Us	7
Have Your Way	Darlene Zschech	Extravagant Worship: The Songs of Darlene Zschech (1)	5 (CD 2)
Have Your Way	Darlene Zschech	Simply Worship 3 (1)	5
Have Your Way	Darlene Zschech	The Secret Place (2)	1
He Is Lord	Ben Fielding	This Is Our God	5
He Shall Be Called	Russell Fragar	Friends in High Places (1)	2
He Shall Be Called	Russell Fragar	Hills Praise (1)	13
Healer	Michael Guglielmucci	This Is Our God	7
Hear Me Calling	Geoff Bullock	The Power of Your Love	7
Heartbeats	Ben Tennikoff; Joel Houston; Matt Crocker; Michael Guy Chislett	Zion (Deluxe Edition)	10
Heart Like Heaven	Matt Crocker; Joel Houston	Empires	3
Heart Like Heaven	Matt Crocker; Joel Houston	Open Heaven / River Wild	7
Hear Our Praises	Reuben Morgan	Extravagant Worship: The Songs of Reuben Morgan (2)	1 (CD 1)
Hear Our Praises	Reuben Morgan	Touching Heaven Changing Earth (1)	2
Hear Our Praises	Reuben Morgan	Shout to the Lord 2000 (2)	16
Hear Our Praises	Reuben Morgan	The Platinum Collection Volume 1: Shout to the Lord (2)	15 (CD 1)
Hear Our Prayer	Tanya Riches	Overwhelmed (2)	2
Hear Our Prayer	Tanya Riches	Everyday (1)	8
Heaven	Reuben Morgan	Extravagant Worship: The Songs of Reuben Morgan (2)	8 (CD 1)
Heaven	Reuben Morgan	Simply Worship 3 (1)	8
Heaven	Reuben Morgan	Everyday (2)	5
Heaven and Earth (Live)	Ben Fielding and Sam Kncock	No Other Name	2
Heaven in My Heart	David Wakerley; Beci Wakerley	Super Strong God	8
Here I Am (Father's Love)	Jonas Myrin; Natasha Bedingfield	Shout God's Fame	9
Here I Am to Worship / Call	Tim Hughes / Darlene Zschech	Hope (1)	10 (CD 1)
Here I Am to Worship / Call	Tim Hughes / Darlene Zschech	Ultimate Worship	8
Here in My Life	Mia Fieldes	Saviour King	12
Here Now (Madness)	Joel Houston; Michael Guy Chislett	Empires	1
Here Now (Madness)	Joel Houston; Michael Guy Chislett	Open Heaven / River Wild (Deluxe Edition)	13
Here to Eternity	Darlene Zschech; David Moyse	For This Cause	9
Here With You	Jamie Snell; Johannes Shore; Joshua Grimmett	Open Heaven / River Wild	9
He's Real	Russell Fragar	Hills Praise (1)	3
He's Real	Russell Fragar	Shout to the Lord (1)	8
He's Real	Russell Fragar	The Platinum Collection Volume 1: Shout to the Lord (1)	2 (CD 1)
High and Lifted Up	Darlene Zschech; Mike Guglielmucci	This Is Our God	6
Higher / I Believe in You	Mia Fieldes / Darlene Zschech	Mighty to Save	13
Highest	Reuben Morgan	Hope (1)	11 (CD 1)
Highest	Reuben Morgan	Hope (2)	7 (CD 2)
Highest	Reuben Morgan	Ultimate Worship (1)	15
His Glory Appears	Brooke Fraser	Faith + Hope + Love	10
His Love	Raymond Badham	God He Reigns	3 (CD 1)
History Maker	Martin Smith	UP: Unified Praise	11
History Maker	Martin Smith	Shout God's Fame	8
Holding On	Geoff Bullock	Friends in High Places	9
Holy One of God	Geoff Bullock	Stone's Been Rolled Away	7
Holy Spirit Come	Geoff Bullock	Stone's Been Rolled Away	6
Holy Spirit Rain Down	Russell Fragar	Simply Worship 3 (1)	1
Holy Spirit Rain Down	Russell Fragar	The Platinum Collection Volume 1: Shout to the Lord (1)	13 (CD 2)
Holy Spirit Rain Down	Russell Fragar	The Secret Place (2)	9
Holy Spirit Rain Down	Russell Fragar	Touching Heaven Changing Earth (1)	5
Holy Spirit Rise	Geoff Bullock	The Power of Your Love	13
Holy, Holy, Holy	traditional arranged by: Reuben Morgan; Peter King	King of Majesty	10
Home	Marty Sampson	For All You've Done	8 (CD 1)
Hope of The World	Reuben Morgan; Jason Ingram; Matthew Bronleewee	Cornerstone	5
Hope of The World (Studio Version)	Reuben Morgan; Jason Ingram; Matthew Bronleewee	Cornerstone	13
Hosanna (1)	Stuart Garrard; Peter Wilson	Jesus Is	6
Hosanna (2)	Brooke Fraser	All of the Above (1)	8
Hosanna (2)	Brooke Fraser	Saviour King	11
How Can You Refuse Him Now?	Hank Williams	Songs for Communion	14
How Great Is Our God	Chris Tomlin; Jesse Reeves; Ed Cash	Jesus Is (1)	13
How Great Is Our God	Chris Tomlin; Jesse Reeves; Ed Cash	Jesus Is: Remix (2)	10
How I Long for You	Marty Sampson	Faithful	11

== I ==
Title	Author	Album	Track
I Will Praise You	Ben Fielding, Joel Houston, Matt Crocker, Dylan Thomas	Awake (2019)	7
I Adore	Reuben Morgan	Blessed (2)	9
I Adore	Reuben Morgan	King of Majesty (1)	5
I Believe (1)	Geoff Bullock	Stone's Been Rolled Away	8
I Believe (2)	Marty Sampson	Mighty to Save	10
I Believe the Promise	Russell Fragar	God Is in the House (1)	11
I Believe the Promise	Russell Fragar	I Believe the Promise (3)	1
I Believe the Promise	Russell Fragar	Shout to the Lord (2)	2
I Believe the Promise	Russell Fragar	The Platinum Collection Volume 1: Shout to the Lord (1)	2 (CD 2)
I Believe in Jesus	Mia Fieldes	Super Strong God	15
I Belong to You	Reuben Morgan	Extravagant Worship: The Songs of Reuben Morgan (1)	7 (CD 2)
I Belong to You	Reuben Morgan	Simply Worship 2 (1)	3
I Bow My Knee (I'll Love You More)	Rob and Debbie Eastwood	Simply Worship (1)	3
I Bow My Knee (I'll Love You More)	Rob and Debbie Eastwood	Stone's Been Rolled Away (1)	4
I Can Feel Your Love	Paul Iannuzzelli	Jump to the Jam	4
I Can't Wait	Russell Fragar	Friends in High Places (1)	15
I Can't Wait	Russell Fragar	Hills Praise (1)	6
I Could Sing of Your Love Forever / God's Romance	Martin Smith	UP: Unified Praise	5
I Desire Jesus	Scott Ligertwood	Cornerstone (Deluxe Edition)	14
I Draw Near to You	Darlene Zschech; Reuben Morgan	Extravagant Worship: The Songs of Darlene Zschech (1)	4 (CD 1)
I Draw Near to You	Darlene Zschech; Reuben Morgan	Simply Worship 2 (1)	9
I Feel Like I'm Falling	Raymond Badham	By Your Side	3
I Found Love	Babette Rae	Awake (2000)	2
I Give You My Heart	Reuben Morgan	Chosen One (2)	8
I Give You My Heart	Reuben Morgan	Extravagant Worship: The Songs of Reuben Morgan (1)	10 (CD 2)
I Give You My Heart	Reuben Morgan	God Is in the House (1)	8
I Give You My Heart	Reuben Morgan	My Redeemer Lives (1)	7
I Give You My Heart	Reuben Morgan	Simply Worship (1)	5
I Give You My Heart	Reuben Morgan	The Platinum Collection Volume 1: Shout to the Lord (1)	10 (CD 1)
I Give You My Heart	Reuben Morgan	The Secret Place (3)	4
I Give You My Heart	Reuben Morgan	Ultimate Worship (4)	10
I Give You My Heart	Reuben Morgan	UP: Unified Praise (4)	3
I Just Love You So Much	Paul Iannuzzelli	Jump to the Jam	7
I Just Want to Praise the Lord	Geoff Bullock	People Just Like Us	9
I Know It	Darlene Zschech	All Things Are Possible (1)	11
I Know It	Darlene Zschech	Extravagant Worship: The Songs of Darlene Zschech (1)	2 (CD 2)
I Know It	Darlene Zschech	I Believe the Promise (2)	7
I Lift My Hands	Jay Cook	Jesus Is	9
I Live for You	Raymond Badham	Best Friend	6
I Live to Know You	Darlene Zschech	All Things Are Possible (1)	5
I Live to Know You	Darlene Zschech	Extravagant Worship: The Songs of Darlene Zschech (2)	9 (CD 1)
I Live to Know You	Darlene Zschech	Simply Worship 3 (1)	7
I'll Worship You	Geoff Bullock	Friends in High Places	13
I Love You	Kira Gregson; Julia A'Bell; Beci Wakerley	Super Strong God	14
I'm Not Ashamed	Paul Andrew; Dylan Thomas	Saviour King	1
I'm Really Happy	David Wakerley; Beci Wakerley	Jesus Is My Superhero	3
I Need You	Matt Wakeling	One	3
In Freedom	Aran Puddle	By Your Side (1)	9
In Freedom	Aran Puddle	My Redeemer Lives (1)	3
In God We Trust	Ben Fielding; Eric Liljero; Reuben Morgan	Open Heaven / River Wild	10
In the Gap	Wayne Davis	Jump to the Jam	1
In the Mystery	Joel Houston	Saviour King	9
In the Name of the Lord	Geoff Bullock	People Just Like Us	4
In the Silence	Paul Iannuzzelli	People Just Like Us (1)	11
In the Silence	Paul Iannuzzelli	Simply Worship (1)	7
In You I Stand	Paul Nevison; Gio Galanti	Shout God's Fame	11
In Your Eyes	Benjamin Hastings; Ben Tan	Youth Revival	11
In Your Freedom	Marty Sampson; Raymond Badham	Saviour King	3
In Your Hands	Reuben Morgan	All Things Are Possible (1)	6
In Your Hands	Reuben Morgan	Extravagant Worship: The Songs of Reuben Morgan (1)	9 (CD 1)
In Your Hands	Reuben Morgan	Simply Worship 3 (1)	9
In Your Hands	Reuben Morgan	The Platinum Collection Volume 2: Shout to the Lord 2 (1)	6 (CD 1)
Irresistible	Darlene Zschech	Extravagant Worship: The Songs of Darlene Zschech (1)	5 (CD 1)
Irresistible	Darlene Zschech	Forever (2)	5
Irresistible	Darlene Zschech	You Are My World (1)	6
I Simply Live for You	Russell Fragar	For This Cause	6
I Surrender (1)	Geoff Bullock	Stone's Been Rolled Away	13
I Surrender (2)	Matt Crocker	Cornerstone	4
It Is He	Miriam Webster	Simply Worship 3	4
It Is You	Darlene Zschech	Extravagant Worship: The Songs of Darlene Zschech (1)	6 (CD 2)
It Is You	Darlene Zschech	Forever (2)	6
It Is You	Darlene Zschech	For This Cause (1)	12
It Is You	Darlene Zschech	The Platinum Collection Volume 2: Shout to the Lord 2 (1)	4 (CD 2)
It's a New Day	Tim Michael	Jesus Is	3
It's Your Love	Mia Fields	Faith + Hope + Love	4
I Wanna Be with You	Paul Iannuzzelli	Jump to the Jam	6
I Will Bless You Lord	Darlene Zschech	Extravagant Worship: The Songs of Darlene Zschech (2)	6 (CD 1)
I Will Bless You Lord	Darlene Zschech	Simply Worship 3 (1)	10
I Will Bless You Lord	Darlene Zschech	Touching Heaven Changing Earth (1)	11
I Will Exalt You	Brooke Fraser	Faith + Hope + Love	5
I Will Go	Jonas Myrin; Natasha Bedingfield	Shout God's Fame	7
I Will Love	Miriam Webster	Extravagant Worship: The Songs of Miriam Webster (3)	5
I Will Love	Miriam Webster	For All You've Done (1)	3 (CD 2)
I Will Love	Miriam Webster	Songs for Communion (2)	8
I Will Never Be	Geoff Bullock	Shout to the Lord	5
I Will Run to You	Darlene Zschech	God Is in the House (1)	14
I Will Run to You	Darlene Zschech	Simply Worship (1)	1
I Will Run to You	Darlene Zschech	The Platinum Collection Volume 1: Shout to the Lord (1)	7 (CD 1)
I Will Sing	Rebecca Mesiti	Best Friend	8
I Will Worship You	Geoff Bullock	The Power of Your Love	11
In Sync	Matt Crocker, Aodhán King and Ben Tan	We Are Young and Free	10

== J ==
Title	Author	Album	Track
Jesus' Blood	Martin Smith	More Than Life	12
Jesus' Generation	Reuben Morgan	Extravagant Worship: The Songs of Reuben Morgan (1)	10 (CD 1)
Jesus' Generation	Reuben Morgan	Best Friend (1)	7
Jesus I Adore You	Tanya Riches	Simply Worship 3	6
Jesus I Long	Marty Sampson	Everyday	2
Jesus I Need You		Open Heaven / River Wild	8
Jesus in My Life	Karen Horn; Sam Knock; Andy Wallis	Super Strong God	10
Jesus Is	Gary Clarke; Peter Wilson	Jesus Is (1)	14
Jesus Is	Gary Clarke; Peter Wilson	Jesus Is: Remix (2)	12
Jesus Is Alive	Ron Kenoly	Shout to the Lord 2000	5
Jesus Is My Superhero	David Wakerley; Beci Wakerley	Jesus Is My Superhero (1)	1
Jesus Is My Superhero	David Wakerley; Beci Wakerley	Jesus Is My Superhero (2)	15
Jesus, Jesus	Geoff Bullock	Shout to the Lord	4
Jesus, Lover of My Soul	Daniel Grul; John Ezzy; Steve McPherson	I Believe the Promise (4)	9
Jesus, Lover of My Soul	Daniel Grul; John Ezzy; Steve McPherson	Jump to the Jam (2)	10
Jesus, Lover of My Soul	Daniel Grul; John Ezzy; Steve McPherson	Shout to the Lord (3)	6
Jesus, Lover of My Soul	Daniel Grul; John Ezzy; Steve McPherson	Stone's Been Rolled Away (1)	10
Jesus, Lover of My Soul	Daniel Grul; John Ezzy; Steve McPherson	The Platinum Collection Volume 1: Shout to the Lord (3)	12 (CD 1)
Jesus, Lover of My Soul	Daniel Grul; John Ezzy; Steve McPherson	The Platinum Collection Volume 2: Shout to the Lord 2 (5)	11 (CD 2)
Jesus, Lover of My Soul	Daniel Grul; John Ezzy; Steve McPherson	Best Friend (5)	9
Jesus, Our Lord Jesus	Russell Fragar	Overwhelmed	6
Jesus the Same	Raymond Badham	For All You've Done	2 (CD 2)
Jesus, What a Beautiful Name	Tanya Riches	Christmas (3)	4
Jesus, What a Beautiful Name	Tanya Riches	God Is in the House (1)	6
Jesus, What a Beautiful Name	Tanya Riches	I Believe the Promise (2)	4
Jesus, What a Beautiful Name	Tanya Riches	Simply Worship (1)	8
Jesus, What a Beautiful Name	Tanya Riches	The Platinum Collection Volume 1: Shout to the Lord (1)	7 (CD 2)
Jesus Won It All	Miriam Webster	Amazing Love (1)	11
Jesus Won It All	Miriam Webster	Extravagant Worship: The Songs of Miriam Webster (2)	6
Jesus, You Gave It All	Craig Gower	Simply Worship 2 (1)	7
Jesus, You Gave It All	Craig Gower	The Platinum Collection Volume 1: Shout to the Lord (2)	9 (CD 1)
Jesus, You Gave It All	Craig Gower	Touching Heaven Changing Earth (2)	7
Jesus, You're All I Need	Darlene Zschech	Extravagant Worship: The Songs of Darlene Zschech (1)	9 (CD 2)
Jesus, You're All I Need	Darlene Zschech	Touching Heaven Changing Earth (1)	13
Joy in the Holy Ghost	Russell Fragar	God Is in the House (1)	2
Joy in the Holy Ghost	Russell Fragar	Hills Praise (1)	14
Joy in the Holy Ghost	Russell Fragar	The Platinum Collection Volume 1: Shout to the Lord (1)	5 (CD 1)
Joy to the World	traditional; arranged by Craig Gower; Nigel Hendroff	Celebrating Christmas	2
Jump to the Jam	Paul Iannuzzelli	Jump to the Jam	8
Just Let Me Say	Geoff Bullock	People Just Like Us	12

== K ==
Title	Author	Album	Track
King of Kings	Brooke Ligertwood, Jason Ingram, Scott Ligertwood	Awake	6
King of Kings (Live)	Brooke Ligertwood, Jason Ingram, Scott Ligertwood	Awake	14
Keep Falling in Love	Scott Haslem	Overwhelmed	9
Kingdom Come	Ben Fielding	United We Stand	12
King of All Days	Dylan Thomas	Tear Down the Walls	4
King of Heaven	Matt Crocker	Zion (Deluxe Edition)	13
King of Kings	Geoff Bullock	Friends in High Places	11
King of Love	Tanya Riches	Hope	4 (CD 2)
King of Majesty	Marty Sampson	Blessed (2)	13
King of Majesty	Marty Sampson	Jesus Is My Superhero (4)	2
King of Majesty	Marty Sampson	Shout God's Fame (3)	12
King of Majesty	Marty Sampson	The Platinum Collection Volume 2: Shout to the Lord 2 (1)	13 (CD 1)
King of Majesty	Marty Sampson	King of Majesty (1)	1
King of Majesty	Marty Sampson	UP: Unified Praise (4)	6
Know You More	Darlene Zschech	God He Reigns	3 (CD 2)
Know You Will	Benjamin Hastings Dylan Thomas Joel Houston	Are We There Yet?	11

== L ==
Title	Author	Album	Track
Latter Rain	Geoff Bullock	The Power of Your Love	15
Lead Me To The Cross	Brooke Fraser	All of the Above	6
Let Creation Sing	Reuben Morgan	God He Reigns (1)	1 (CD 1)
Let Creation Sing	Reuben Morgan	Ultimate Collection Volume II (1)	6
Let the Children Come	Mia Fieldes	Super Strong God	7
Let the Fire	Robbie Howells; Matthew Sage	Chosen One	1
Let the Peace of God Reign	Darlene Zschech	Extravagant Worship: The Songs of Darlene Zschech (2)	8 (CD 2)
Let the Peace of God Reign	Darlene Zschech	God Is in the House (1)	7
Let the Peace of God Reign	Darlene Zschech	Shout to the Lord (2)	1
Let the Peace of God Reign	Darlene Zschech	Simply Worship 2 (1)	2
Let the Peace of God Reign	Darlene Zschech	The Platinum Collection Volume 2: Shout to the Lord 2 (1)	13 (CD 2)
Let the Whole World	David Kennedy; Jay Cook	Jesus Is (1)	5
Let the Whole World	David Kennedy; Jay Cook	Jesus Is: Remix (2)	3
Let Us Adore	Reuben Morgan	God He Reigns (1)	1 (CD 2)
Let Us Adore	Reuben Morgan	Ultimate Collection Volume II (1)	8
Let Your Kingdom Come	Russell Fragar	Overwhelmed	7
Let Your Light Shine	Andy Wallis	Super Strong God	4
Let Your Presence Fall	Dave Willersdorf	Simply Worship (1)	2
Let Your Presence Fall	Dave Willersdorf	Stone's Been Rolled Away (1)	5
Life	Peter James	Songs for Communion	6
Lifeline	Michael Fatkin, Joel Houston, Renee Sieff and Melodie Wagner	We Are Young and Free	4
Lift	Ben McFall	King of Majesty	8
Lift You Higher	Tekiva Ledwidge; Nait Masuku; Reuben Morgan	Glorious Ruins	14
Lifted Me High Again	Reuben Morgan	For This Cause	8
Light	Marty Sampson	More Than Life	2
Light My Way	Matthew Wakeling; Tepa Faletoese	The Plan	10
Light Will Shine	Matt Crocker; Marty Sampson	Aftermath	10
Like Incense/Step By Step	Brooke Fraser; David Strasser; Rich Mullins	A Beautiful Exchange	5
Like An Avalanche	Dylan Thomas; Joel Houston	Aftermath	3
Live in Me	Matthew Wakeling	Awake	1
Look from Heaven	David Wakerley; Beci Wakerley	Super Strong God	12
Longin' for Your Touch	Paul Iannuzzelli; Tim Uluirewa	Hills Praise (1)	12
Longin' for Your Touch	Paul Iannuzzelli; Tim Uluirewa	People Just Like Us (1)	10
Look to You	Marty Sampson	Look to You (1)	3
Look to You	Marty Sampson	The I Heart Revolution: With Hearts as One (2)	9 (CD 1)
Lord I Give Myself	Darlene Zschech	Extravagant Worship: The Songs of Darlene Zschech (1)	7 (CD 2)
Lord I Give Myself	Darlene Zschech	Friends in High Places (1)	12
Lord I Give Myself	Darlene Zschech	Simply Worship (1)	4
The Lord Is Good	Reuben Morgan	Overwhelmed	11
Lord of All (1)	Steve McPherson	All Things Are Possible (1)	7
Lord of All (1)	Steve McPherson	Simply Worship 2 (1)	4
Lord of All (1)	Steve McPherson	The Platinum Collection Volume 2: Shout to the Lord 2 (1)	11 (CD 1)
Lord of All (2)	Gio Galanti; Paul Nevison	Jesus Is (1)	1
Lord of All (2)	Gio Galanti; Paul Nevison	Jesus Is: Remix (2)	1
Lord of All (2)	Gio Galanti; Paul Nevison	Ultimate Collection Volume II (1)	5
Lord of the Heavens	Lucy Fisher	God Is in the House (1)	13
Lord of the Heavens	Lucy Fisher	Simply Worship (1)	6
Lord of Lords	Brooke Fraser	Saviour King	5
Lord We Come	Geoff Bullock	The Power of Your Love	10
Lord Your Goodness	Reuben Morgan	Touching Heaven Changing Earth	4
The Lost Are Found	Sam Knock; Ben Fielding	God Is Able	4
The Love of God Can Do	Christine and Russell Fragar	All Things Are Possible	10
Love Enough	Braden Lang; Scott Ligertwood	In a Valley by the Sea	2
Love Goes On	Joel Davies, Hannah Hobbs and Laura Toggs	We Are Young and Free	6
Love Knows No End	Ben Fielding; Reuben Morgan; Harrison Wood	Cornerstone	11
Love Like Fire	Matt Crocker	A Beautiful Exchange	9
Love is War	Joel Houston	Zion (Deluxe Edition)	4
Love On the Line	Aryel Murphy; Brooke Ligertwood; Scott Ligertwood	Open Heaven / River Wild	2
Love So High	Matt Redman; Chris Tomlin; Reuben Morgan; Jason Ingram	Cornerstone (Deluxe Edition)	13
Love Song (1)	Simon Refalo	One	6
Love Song (2)	Mia Fieldes	Faithful	6
Love You so Much	Russell Fragar	All Things Are Possible (1)	4
Love You so Much	Russell Fragar	Shout to the Lord 2000 (2)	9
Love You so Much	Russell Fragar	Simply Worship 2 (1)	12
Love You so Much	Russell Fragar	The Platinum Collection Volume 1: Shout to the Lord (1)	12 (CD 2)
Love You so Much	Russell Fragar	The Secret Place (3)	2

== M ==
Title	Author	Album	Track
Made Me Glad	Miriam Webster	Blessed (1)	4
Made Me Glad	Miriam Webster	Extravagant Worship: The Songs of Miriam Webster (2)	1
Made Me Glad	Miriam Webster	The Platinum Collection Volume 2: Shout to the Lord 2 (1)	5 (CD 1)
Made Me Glad	Miriam Webster	Ultimate Worship (1)	4
Magnificent	Raymond Badham	Blessed (1)	8
Magnificent	Raymond Badham	Faithful (2)	12
Magnificent	Raymond Badham	The Platinum Collection Volume 2: Shout to the Lord 2 (1)	7 (CD 2)
Majesty	Martin Smith; Stuart Garrard	More Than Life (1)	6
Majesty	Martin Smith; Stuart Garrard	UP: Unified Praise (2)	9
Make Me Your Servant	Russell Fragar	Stone's Been Rolled Away	9
Man of Sorrows (Live)	Brooke Ligertwood; Matt Crocker	Glorious Ruins	10
Man of Sorrows (Live)	Brooke Ligertwood; Matt Crocker	O Praise the Name (Anástasis)	4
Melt	Babette Rae; Warren Jackson; Peter King	One	4
Mercy Endures	Darlene Zschech	Faithful	3
Mercy Mercy	Matt Crocker; Joel Houston	Zion	6
Mercy Mercy" (Reloaded)	Matt Crocker; Joel Houston	Zion (Deluxe Edition)	16
Mighty to Save	Ben Fielding; Reuben Morgan	Mighty to Save (1)	14
Mighty to Save	Ben Fielding; Reuben Morgan	The I Heart Revolution, Live In Miami (2)	4 (CD 2)
Mighty to Save	Ben Fielding; Reuben Morgan	Ultimate Collection Volume II (1)	17
More	Reuben Morgan	Everyday	4
More to See	Darlene Zschech; Mia Fieldes; Deborah Ezzy; Donia Makedonez; Nigel Hendroff	Mighty to Save	8
More Than	Mia Fieldes	Faithful	1
More Than Anything	Joel Davies; Braden Lang	Tear Down the Walls	3
More Than Life	Reuben Morgan	For All You've Done (2)	5 (CD 2)
More Than Life	Reuben Morgan	More Than Life (1)	11
Most High	Reuben Morgan	Blessed (2)	12
Most High	Reuben Morgan	King of Majesty (1)	2
Most Holy	Miriam Webster	Faithful	8
Mountain (Live)	Matt Crocker and Joel Houston	No Other Name	11
Mountains (Bonus)	Matt Crocker and Joel Houston	Zion (Deluxe Edition)	15
My Best Friend	Marty Sampson; Joel Houston	Best Friend (1)	1
My Best Friend	Marty Sampson; Joel Houston	You Are My World (2)	13
My Freedom	Leah Cooney	Awake	6
My Future Decided	Jonathon Douglass; Joel Houston	All of the Above	11
My God	Marty Sampson	Shout God's Fame	2
My God	Marty Sampson	To the Ends of the Earth (1)	10
My God	Marty Sampson	To the Ends of the Earth (2)	14
My Greatest Love is You	Russell Fragar	My Redeemer Lives (1)	5
My Greatest Love is You	Russell Fragar	The Secret Place (2)	6
My Greatest Love is You	Russell Fragar	Touching Heaven Changing Earth (1)	12
My Heart Is Overwhelmed	Dylan Thomas	God Is Able	10
My Heart Sings Praises	Russell Fragar	God Is in the House (1)	4
My Heart Sings Praises	Russell Fragar	Hills Praise (1)	7
My Heart Will Trust	Reuben Morgan	Amazing Love (3)	3
My Heart Will Trust	Reuben Morgan	Extravagant Worship: The Songs of Reuben Morgan (2)	5 (CD 1)
My Heart Will Trust	Reuben Morgan	Touching Heaven Changing Earth (1)	4
My Heart Will Trust	Reuben Morgan	Shout to the Lord 2000 (2)	7
My Hope	Darlene Zschech	Hope (2)	5 (CD 1)
My Hope	Darlene Zschech	The Platinum Collection Volume 2: Shout to the Lord 2 (1)	14 (CD 2)
My Hope Is Jesus	Adrian Lewis	Songs for Communion	2
My Redeemer Lives	Reuben Morgan	By Your Side (2)	1
My Redeemer Lives	Reuben Morgan	Extravagant Worship: The Songs of Reuben Morgan (2)	1 (CD 2)
My Redeemer Lives	Reuben Morgan	My Redeemer Lives (3)	4
My Redeemer Lives	Reuben Morgan	Touching Heaven Changing Earth (1)	1
My Redeemer Lives	Reuben Morgan	Shout to the Lord 2000 (3)	11
My Redeemer Lives	Reuben Morgan	The Platinum Collection Volume 1: Shout to the Lord (2)	3 (CD 1)
My Redeemer Lives	Reuben Morgan	Ultimate Worship (2)	2
My Story (Live)	Reuben Morgan and Jarrad Rogers	No Other Name	9

== N ==
Title	Author	Album	Track
No One but You	Aodhán King, Brooke Ligertwood, Scott Ligertwood	Awake (2019)	5
No One but You (Live)	Aodhán King, Brooke Ligertwood, Scott Ligertwood	Awake (2019)	15
Not Afraid	Ben Fielding Joel Houston Matt Crocker	Are We There Yet?	13
Narrow Road	Braden Lang	God Is Able	9
Need You Here	Reuben Morgan	Hope (2)	4 (CD 1)
Need You Here	Reuben Morgan	To the Ends of the Earth (1)	7
Never Alone	Matthew Wakeling	Awake (2000)	11
Never Alone	Ben Tan; Tracy Pratt	Youth Revival	7
Never Forsaken	Benjamin Hastings and Hannah Hobbs	Open Heaven / River Wild	12
Never Give Up	Brittany Grey	Jesus Is My Superhero	4
Never Let Me Go	Joel Houston	All of the Above	12
New Day	Tim Michael	Jesus Is: Remix	4
Night Song	Kirsty Thornthwaite; David Wakerley	Jesus Is My Superhero	12
No More Than a Heartbeat Away	Reuben Morgan	Overwhelmed	3
None but Jesus	Brooke Fraser	Mighty to Save	12
None but Jesus	Brooke Fraser	Ultimate Collection Volume II (1)	15
None but Jesus	Brooke Fraser	United We Stand (1)	8
No One Like You	Joel Houston	United We Stand	13
No Other Name (Live)	Joel Houston and Jonas Myrin	No Other Name	4
No Other Name (Radio Version) [Live]	Joel Houston and Jonas Myrin	No Other Name	18
Nothing but the Blood	Robert Lowry	Songs for Communion	1
Nothing Like Your Love	Hillsong United	Zion	
No Reason To Hide	Joel Houston, Matt Crocker	Faith + Hope + Love	7
No Reason To Hide	Joel Houston, Matt Crocker	Tear Down the Walls	2
Now Is the Time	Geoff Bullock	Friends in High Places	6
Now That You're Near	Marty Sampson	Blessed (1)	2
Now That You're Near	Marty Sampson	To the Ends of the Earth (2)	11
Now That You're Near	Marty Sampson	Ultimate Worship (2)	12
Nova	Joel Houston; Matt Crocker; Michael Guy Chislett	Aftermath	9

== O ==
Title	Author	Album	Track
O Come All Ye Faithful / Jesus You Are All I Live For	traditional; arranged by: Russell Fragar; Simeon Webster	Christmas	12
O Come, O Come Emmanuel	traditional; arranged by Nigel Hendroff	Celebrating Christmas	5
Oceans (Where Feet May Fail)	Matt Crocker, Joel Houston and Salomon Ligthelm	Zion	4
Oceans (Where Feet May Fail) [Reloaded]	Matt Crocker, Joel Houston and Salomon Ligthelm	Zion (Deluxe Edition)	17
Oceans Will Part	Ben Fielding	Mighty to Save	11
Oh How I Love You	Julia A'Bell	Jesus Is My Superhero	6
Oh the Blood	Darlene Zschech	Songs for Communion	9
O Little Town of Bethlehem	traditional: arranged by: Peter King	Celebrating Christmas	6
O Praise the Name (Anástasis)	Benjamin Hastings; Dean Ussher; Marty Sampson	O Praise the Name (Anástasis)	1
O Praise the Name (Anástasis)	Benjamin Hastings; Dean Ussher; Marty Sampson	Open Heaven / River Wild	1
Oh You Bring	Matt Crocker	Tear Down the Walls	6
On Repeat	Ben Fielding Aodhán King Benjamin Hastings Joel Houston	Are We There Yet?	5
On the Lord's Day	Reuben Morgan	Extravagant Worship: The Songs of Reuben Morgan (1)	9 (CD 2)
On the Lord's Day	Reuben Morgan	Everyday (1)	3
One Day	Reuben Morgan	Extravagant Worship: The Songs of Reuben Morgan (1)	2 (CD 1)
One Day	Reuben Morgan	For This Cause (1)	1
One Day	Reuben Morgan	The Platinum Collection Volume 2: Shout to the Lord 2 (1)	1 (CD 1)
One Desire	Joel Houston	Blessed	7
One Hope	Russell Fragar; Darlene Zschech	Extravagant Worship: The Songs of Darlene Zschech (1)	8 (CD 1)
One Hope	Russell Fragar; Darlene Zschech	Simply Worship (1)	12
One Thing (1)	Marty Sampson; Darlene Zschech	Saviour King	6
One Thing (2)	Joel Houston; Aodhán King; Dylan Thomas	Open Heaven / River Wild	3
One Way	Jonathon Douglass; Joel Houston	For All You've Done (2)	2 (CD 1)
One Way	Jonathon Douglass; Joel Houston	More Than Life (1)	1
One Way	Jonathon Douglass; Joel Houston	Super Strong God (4)	2
One Way	Jonathon Douglass; Joel Houston	Ultimate Worship (2)	1
The One Who Saves	Ben Fielding	A Beautiful Exchange	4
The Only Name	Darlene Zschech; Miriam Webster	Extravagant Worship: The Songs of Miriam Webster	10
The Only Name	Darlene Zschech; Miriam Webster	Songs for Communion (1)	3
Only One	Joel Davies	Look to You	9
Only One for Me	Jay Cook	Jesus Is (1)	2
Only One for Me	Jay Cook	Jesus Is: Remix (2)	2
Only Wanna Sing	Aodhán King; Ben Tan; Michael Fatkin	Youth Revival	3
Only You	Matt Crocker; Nathan Finochio; Carl Lentz; Dylan Thomas	Glorious Ruins (Deluxe Edition)	15
Open Heaven (River Wild)	Marty Sampson and Matt Crocker	Open Heaven / River Wild	4
Open My Eyes	Reuben Morgan	A Beautiful Exchange	2
Open Up the Heavens	Joel Houston	More Than Life	4
O Rejoice	Mia Fieldes	Celebrating Christmas	4
Our Father	Robert Eastwood	Simply Worship 2	6
Our Father (Live)	Brooke Ligertwood, Scott Ligertwood and Jonas Myrin	No Other Name	10
Our Father (Live)	Brooke Ligertwood, Scott Ligertwood and Jonas Myrin	O Praise the Name (Anástasis)	5
Our God is Love	Joel Houston; Scott Ligertwood	A Beautiful Exchange	1
Overwhelmed	Darlene Zschech	Overwhelmed	4

== P ==
Title	Author	Album	Track
Passion	Aodhán King; Bede Benjamin-Korporaal; Ben Tan; Laura Toggs	Youth Revival	12
Pearls and Gold	Darlene Zschech	Extravagant Worship: The Songs of Darlene Zschech	10 (CD 2)
People Get Free	Russell Fragar	All Things Are Possible	3
People Just Like Us	Russell Fragar	Hills Praise (1)	2
People Just Like Us	Russell Fragar	I Believe the Promise (3)	2
People Just Like Us	Russell Fragar	People Just Like Us (1)	2
People Just Like Us	Russell Fragar	Shout to the Lord (2)	3
People Just Like Us	Russell Fragar	The Platinum Collection Volume 1: Shout to the Lord (1)	1 (CD 1)
Perfect King	Damian Bassett	King of Majesty	9
Perfect Love	Dylan Thomas	In a Valley by the Sea	3
Perfect Love (Mary's Song)	Darlene Zschech; Russell Fragar	Christmas (1)	7
Perfect Love (Mary's Song)	Darlene Zschech; Russell Fragar	Extravagant Worship: The Songs of Darlene Zschech (1)	7 (CD 1)
Point of Difference	Joel Houston	All of the Above	1
The Potter's Hand	Darlene Zschech	Extravagant Worship: The Songs of Darlene Zschech (2)	4 (CD 2)
The Potter's Hand	Darlene Zschech	Shout to the Lord 2000 (2)	8
The Potter's Hand	Darlene Zschech	The Platinum Collection Volume 1: Shout to the Lord (1)	11 (CD 1)
The Potter's Hand	Darlene Zschech	The Secret Place (3)	3
The Potter's Hand	Darlene Zschech	Touching Heaven Changing Earth (1)	14
The Potter's Hand	Darlene Zschech	Ultimate Worship (1)	5
The Power and the Glory	Geoff Bullock	People Just Like Us	6
The Power of Your Love	Geoff Bullock	Shout to the Lord (2)	9
The Power of Your Love	Geoff Bullock	The Platinum Collection Volume 1: Shout to the Lord (1)	8 (CD 2)
The Power of Your Love	Geoff Bullock	The Power of Your Love (1)	9
Power to Ya	John Waller	Chosen One	12
Praise Him	Matt Crocker; Nathan Finnochio	Cornerstone (Deluxe Edition)	15
Praise His Holy Name	Darlene Zschech	Extravagant Worship: The Songs of Darlene Zschech (1)	12 (CD 1)
Praise His Holy Name	Darlene Zschech	Friends in High Places (1)	3
Praise His Holy Name	Darlene Zschech	Hills Praise (1)	5
Prayer to the King	Marty Sampson	Everyday	9
Prince of Peace	Dylan Thomas; Joel Houston; Matt Crocker	Empires	8
Pursue	Aodhán King; Hannah Hobbs	This Is Living	3
Pursue / All I Need Is You (Medley)	Aodhán King; Hannah Hobbs; Marty Sampson	Open Heaven / River Wild (Deluxe Edition)	16

== Q ==
No songs begin with 'Q'

== R ==
Title	Author	Album	Track
Radio	David Wakerley; Beci Wakerley	Super Strong God	9
Rainbow	David Wakerley; Beci Wakerley	Super Strong God	1
Rain Down	Martin Smith; Stuart Garrard	UP: Unified Praise	8
Reaching for You	Raymond Badham	For This Cause	11
Real	Paul Denham; Peter King; Marty Sampson	The Plan	9
Real Love	Alexander Pappas; Hannah Hobbs; Michael Fatkin	Youth Revival	2
Real Love (Studio Version)	Alexander Pappas; Hannah Hobbs; Michael Fatkin	Real Love (Studio Version) – Single	Single
The Real Thing	Simon Refalo	Chosen One	10
Reason I Live	Donia Makedonez	Amazing Love	9
The Reason I Live	Marty Sampson	Best Friend	10
The Reason Why	Russell Fragar	Christmas	5
Redeeming King	Scott Hopkins; Miriam Webster	Songs for Communion	12
Refresh My Heart Lord	Geoff Bullock	The Power of Your Love	8
Refuge	Reuben Morgan	Amazing Love	10
Rejoice	Donia Makedonez	Christmas	9
Relentless	Matt Crocker; Joel Houston	Zion	1
Rest in You	Mia Fieldes	Look to You	12
Revolution	Scott Ligertwood; Joel Houston; Marty Sampson; Michael Guy Chislett; Brooke Fraser	United We Stand	11
Rise	Joel Houston	God Is Able	1
River	Darlene Zschech; Reuben Morgan	Simply Worship 3	3
Rock of the Ages	Geoff Bullock; Darlene Zschech	Friends in High Places	4
Royalty	David Wakerley; Beci Wakerley	Super Strong God	3
Rule	Matt Crocker; Joel Houston; Ben Tennikoff	Empires	10
Rule	Matt Crocker; Joel Houston; Ben Tennikoff	Open Heaven / River Wild (Deluxe Edition)	14
Run	Joel Houston	This Is Our God	2
Running	Matt Crocker; Scott Ligertwood	Cornerstone	8

== S ==
Title	Author	Album	Track
Salvation	George	Chosen One (2)	2
Salvation	George	Friends in High Places (1)	8
Salvation Is Here	Joel Houston	God He Reigns (2)	2 (CD 1)
Salvation Is Here	Joel Houston	Look to You (1)	1
Salvation Is Here	Joel Houston	Ultimate Collection Volume II (2)	1
Save the People	Kate Spence	Awake (2000)	10
Save Them	Kate Spence	One	10
Saving Grace	Michelle Fragar	Best Friend	3
Saviour (1)	Simon Refalo	Awake (2000)	3
Saviour (2)	Darlene Zschech	God He Reigns (1)	5 (CD 1)
Saviour (2)	Darlene Zschech	Songs for Communion (2)	5
Saviour Christ the King	Craig Gower	Celebrating Christmas	12
Saviour King	Marty Sampson; Mia Fieldes	All of the Above (1)	14
Saviour King	Marty Sampson; Mia Fieldes	Saviour King (2)	14
Saviour of the World	Katia Bowley	Christmas	3
Saviour's Love	Gio Galanti; Paul Nevison	Jesus Is (1)	7
Saviour's Love	Gio Galanti; Paul Nevison	Jesus Is: Remix (2)	11
Say the Word	Joel Houston	Empires	2
Scandal of Grace	Ben Tennikoff; Joel Houston; Matt Crocker	Zion	3
Scarlet Hands	Aaron Watson; Mia Fieldes	Songs for Communion	10
Search Me, O God	Nigel Hendroff; Steve McPherson	Faithful	10
Search My Heart	Joel Houston; Jad Gillies	Aftermath	11
Search My Heart (Radio Version)	Joel Houston; Jad Gillies	Aftermath	13
Second Chance	Braden Lang; Scott Ligertwood	In a Valley by the Sea	4
See The Light	Ben Fielding, Reuben Morgan	Awake (2019)	4
See The Light (Live)	Ben Fielding, Reuben Morgan	Awake (2019)	13
Send It on Down	Geron Davis	Jump to the Jam	14
Serve the Man	Matt Wakeling; Adam Primossich	The Plan	2
Shadow of Your Wings	Reuben Morgan	I Believe the Promise (2)	3
Shadow of Your Wings	Reuben Morgan	Simply Worship 2 (1)	5
Shelter House	Steve McPherson	All Things Are Possible (1)	2
Shelter House	Steve McPherson	Hills Praise (1)	10
Shine for You	Marty Sampson	More Than Life	13
Shout of The King	Ned Davies	Blessed (1)	3
Shout of The King	Ned Davies	The Platinum Collection Volume 2: Shout to the Lord 2 (1)	2 (CD 1)
Shout to the Lord	Darlene Zschech	Extravagant Worship: The Songs of Darlene Zschech (3)	11 (CD 2)
Shout to the Lord	Darlene Zschech	I Believe the Promise (4)	5
Shout to the Lord	Darlene Zschech	Jump to the Jam (2)	11
Shout to the Lord	Darlene Zschech	My Redeemer Lives (1)	6
Shout to the Lord	Darlene Zschech	People Just Like Us (1)	13
Shout to the Lord	Darlene Zschech	Shout to the Lord (3)	12
Shout to the Lord	Darlene Zschech	Shout to the Lord 2000 (5)	13
Shout to the Lord	Darlene Zschech	Simply Worship (1)	10
Shout to the Lord	Darlene Zschech	The Platinum Collection Volume 1: Shout to the Lord (3)	11 (CD 2)
Shout to the Lord	Darlene Zschech	The Platinum Collection Volume 2: Shout to the Lord 2 (1)	14 (CD 1)
Shout to the Lord	Darlene Zschech	Ultimate Worship (6)	17
Shout unto God	Joel Houston; Marty Sampson	Look to You	6
Shout Your Fame	Jonas Myrin; Gio Galanti; Natasha Bedingfield; Paul Nevison	Hope (1)	2 (CD 2)
Shout Your Fame	Jonas Myrin; Gio Galanti; Natasha Bedingfield; Paul Nevison	Shout God's Fame (2)	1
Shout Your Fame	Jonas Myrin; Gio Galanti; Natasha Bedingfield; Paul Nevison	Ultimate Worship (2)	6
Show Me Your Heart	Joel Houston	Are We There Yet?	4
Show Me Your Ways	Russell Fragar	Shout to the Lord (1)	7
Show Me Your Ways	Russell Fragar	Simply Worship (1)	11
Show Me Your Ways	Russell Fragar	The Platinum Collection Volume 1: Shout to the Lord (1)	6 (CD 1)
Show Me Your Ways	Russell Fragar	The Secret Place (2)	8
Silent Night	traditional; arranged by: Russell Fragar	Christmas	1
Simply Worship	Steve McPherson; David Moyse	Overwhelmed	1
Sing (Your Love)	Reuben Morgan	For All You've Done (2)	5 (CD 1)
Sing (Your Love)	Reuben Morgan	More Than Life (1)	8
Sing Hallelujah	Steve McPherson	Chosen One	3
Sing of Your Great Love	Darlene Zschech	By Your Side (1)	7
Sing of Your Great Love	Darlene Zschech	Extravagant Worship: The Songs of Darlene Zschech (1)	10 (CD 1)
Sing of Your Great Love	Darlene Zschech	The Platinum Collection Volume 2: Shout to the Lord 2 (1)	12 (CD 2)
Sing To The Lord	Mike Guglielmucci; Matt Crocker	This Is Our God	13
Sinking Deep	Joel Davies and Aodhán King	We Are Young and Free	12
Sinking Deep	Joel Davies and Aodhán King	This Is Living	5
So You Would Come	Russell Fragar	All Things Are Possible (1)	14
So You Would Come	Russell Fragar	The Platinum Collection Volume 1: Shout to the Lord (1)	14 (CD 2)
Soldier	Marty Sampson; Tulele Faletolu	More Than Life	14
Solution	Joel Houston; Matt Crocker	All of the Above	10
Son of God	Marty Sampson; Lincoln Brewster	Blessed	6
Song from Heaven	Chris Falson	Jump to the Jam	9
Song of Freedom	Marty Sampson	Hope	1 (CD 2)
Song of Love	Ned Davies	Forever	7
Soon	Brooke Fraser	Tear Down the Walls	8
Sovereign Hands	Mia Fieldes	United We Stand	14
Spring of Life	Paul Ewing	Overwhelmed	10
The Stand	Joel Houston	Ultimate Collection Volume II (1)	11
The Stand	Joel Houston	United We Stand (1)	15
Stand in Awe	Ben Fielding; Reuben Morgan	Cornerstone	10
Star of Bethlehem	David Moyse	Christmas	10
Stay	Luke Munns	By Your Side	11
Stay and Wait	Joel Houston	Zion	5
Stay and Wait (Reloaded)	Joel Houston	Zion (Deluxe Edition)	18
Steadfast Love of the Lord	Donia and John Makedonez	Simply Worship 3	12
Steppin' Out	Steve McPherson	Chosen One (2)	11
Steppin' Out	Steve McPherson	God Is in the House (1)	3
Still	Reuben Morgan	Hope (1)	6 (CD 1)
Still	Reuben Morgan	Ultimate Worship (1)	13
Street Called Mercy	Matt Crocker; Joel Houston	Empires	5
The Stone's Been Rolled Away	Geoff Bullock	Stone's Been Rolled Away	1
Stronger	Reuben Morgan	This Is Our God	7
Stronger Than	Paul Ewing	Best Friend	2
Sunburst (Bonus)	Matt Crocker; Joel Houston; Scott Ligertwood; Michael Guy Chislett	Empires	13
Super Strong God	Julia A'Bell; David Wakerley	Super Strong God	6
Sure Thing	Benjamin Hastings Joel Houston	Are We There Yet?	12

== T ==
Title	Author	Album	Track
Take All of Me	Marty Sampson	For All You've Done (2)	4 (CD 2)
Take All of Me	Marty Sampson	More Than Life (1)	5
Take It All	Matt Crocker; Scott Ligertwood; Marty Sampson	Mighty to Save (2)	1
Take It All	Matt Crocker; Scott Ligertwood; Marty Sampson	Ultimate Collection Volume II (2)	10
Take It All	Matt Crocker; Scott Ligertwood; Marty Sampson	United We Stand (1)	3
Take Heart	Joel Houston	Aftermath	1
Tell the World	Jonathon Douglass; Joel Houston; Marty Sampson	God He Reigns (2)	6 (CD 2)
Tell the World	Jonathon Douglass; Joel Houston; Marty Sampson	Look to You (1)	2
Tapestry	Ben Tennikoff; Joel Houston; Matt Crocker; Michael Guy Chislett; Scott Ligertwood	Zion	12
Thank You, Lord	Dennis Jernigan	God Is in the House (1)	12
Thank You, Lord	Dennis Jernigan	Simply Worship 2 (1)	11
Thank You	Reuben Morgan; Ben Fielding	A Beautiful Exchange	12
Thank You Jesus (Live)	Matt Crocker and Hannah Hobbs	No Other Name	7
Thank You Jesus (Alternate Version) [Live]	Matt Crocker and Hannah Hobbs	No Other Name	17
That's What We Came Here For	Darlene Zschech; Russell Fragar	Shout to the Lord 2000 (2)	10
That's What We Came Here For	Darlene Zschech; Russell Fragar	The Platinum Collection Volume 1: Shout to the Lord (1)	17 (CD 2)
That's What We Came Here For	Darlene Zschech; Russell Fragar	Touching Heaven Changing Earth (1)	1
There is Nothing Like	Marty Sampson; Jonas Myrin	God He Reigns (2)	4 (CD 2)
There is Nothing Like	Marty Sampson; Jonas Myrin	Look to You (1)	7
Thirst for You	Raymond Badham	Amazing Love	8
This I Believe (The Creed) [Live]	Matt Crocker and Ben Fielding	No Other Name	1
This I Believe (The Creed) [Alternate Version] [Live]	Matt Crocker and Ben Fielding	No Other Name	16
This I Believe (The Creed) [Radio Version]	Matt Crocker and Ben Fielding	O Praise the Name (Anástasis)	2
This Is How We Overcome	Reuben Morgan	By Your Side (1)	14
This Is How We Overcome	Reuben Morgan	Extravagant Worship: The Songs of Reuben Morgan (1)	2 (CD 2)
This Is How We Overcome	Reuben Morgan	The Platinum Collection Volume 1: Shout to the Lord (1)	5 (CD 2)
This is Living	Joel Davies and Aodhán King	This Is Living	1
This is Living	Joel Davies and Aodhán King	Open Heaven / River Wild (Deluxe Edition)	15
This is Living	Joel Davies and Aodhán King	Youth Revival	10
This is Living (Acoustic)	Joel Davies and Aodhán King	This Is Living	4
This is our God	Reuben Morgan	This Is Our God	4
This Kingdom	Geoff Bullock	Friends in High Places (1)	14
This Kingdom	Geoff Bullock	Shout to the Lord (2)	10
Through It All	Reuben Morgan	Blessed	5
'Til I See You	Joel Houston; Jadwin Gillies	Jesus Is (2)	8
'Til I See You	Joel Houston; Jadwin Gillies	The I Heart Revolution	4 (CD 1)
'Til I See You	Joel Houston; Jadwin Gillies	Jesus Is: Remix (3)	6
'Til I See You	Joel Houston; Jadwin Gillies	Look to You (1)	11
'Til I See Your Face	Miriam Webster	Extravagant Worship: The Songs of Miriam Webster	11
The Stand	Joel Houston	The I Heart Revolution	6
The Stand (Hillsong Young and Free)	Joel Houston	The Stand – Single	Single
The Time Has Come (1)	Geoff Bullock	The Power of Your Love	1
The Time Has Come (2)	Joel Houston	The I Heart Revolution	1 (CD 1)
The Time Has Come (2)	Joel Houston	United We Stand	2
To Be Like You	Matt Crocker; Brooke Fraser	Glorious Ruins	9
To Know Your Name	Matt Crocker	Saviour King	7
To Know Your Name	Matt Crocker	In a Valley by the Sea	6
To My Knees	Aodhán King; Joel Davies	Youth Revival	5
To the Ends of the Earth	Joel Houston; Marty Sampson	Hope (2)	5 (CD 2)
To the Ends of the Earth	Joel Houston; Marty Sampson	To the Ends of the Earth (1)	6
To the Ends of the Earth	Joel Houston; Marty Sampson	Ultimate Collection Volume II (2)	4
To You	Darlene Zschech	Extravagant Worship: The Songs of Darlene Zschech (1)	3 (CD 2)
To You	Darlene Zschech	You Are My World (1)	10
To You Alone	Reuben Morgan	For All You've Done	7 (CD 2)
Touching Heaven Changing Earth	Reuben Morgan	Extravagant Worship: The Songs of Reuben Morgan (1)	11 (CD 1)
Touching Heaven Changing Earth	Reuben Morgan	The Platinum Collection Volume 1: Shout to the Lord (1)	3 (CD 2)
Touching Heaven Changing Earth	Reuben Morgan	Touching Heaven Changing Earth (1)	2
Touching Heaven Changing Earth	Reuben Morgan	Touching Heaven Changing Earth (2)	15
Touch the Sky	Joel Houston; Dylan Thomas; Michael Guy Chislett	Empires	4
Transfiguration	Aodhán King; Brooke Ligertwood; Scott Ligertwood; Taya Smith	Open Heaven / River Wild	5
True Disciple	Dominic Kelsall	The Plan	4
Trust	Aodhán King; Ben Tan; Melodie Wagner	Youth Revival	6
Trust in You	Joanna Piessens	Amazing Love	6
Turn Your Eyes on Jesus	Helen Lemel	The Secret Place	10
Turn Your Eyes on Jesus	Helen Lemel	This Is Our God	15

== U ==
Title	Author	Album	Track
Upper Room	Benjamin Hastings, Joel Houston	Awake	11
You Are Why (U.R.Y.)	Kate Spence	The Plan	6
Unending Love	Jill McCloghry; Sam Knock	God Is Able	3
Unify	Michelle Fragar	To the Ends of the Earth	4
Up in Arms	Joel Houston	Zion	2

Valentine

== W ==
Title	Author	Album	Track
Walking in the Light	Darlene Zschech	God Is in the House (1)	9
Walking in the Light	Darlene Zschech	My Redeemer Lives (1)	1
Wake	Joel Davies, Hannah Hobbs and Alexander Pappas	We Are Young and Free	3
Wake (Studio Version)	Joel Davies, Hannah Hobbs and Alexander Pappas	We Are Young and Free	14
We Declare the Power	Bruce Robertson	Jump to the Jam	3
We Glorify Your Name	Ed Cash; Jason Ingram; Matt Maher; Reuben Morgan; Chris Tomlin	Glorious Ruins	11
We The Redeemed	Jill McCloghry	Faith + Hope + Love	11
We Will Rise	Geoff Bullock	The Power of Your Love	2
We Will See Him	Robert Fergusson; Reuben Morgan	Faith + Hope + Love	12
Welcome in This Place	Miriam Webster	Extravagant Worship: The Songs of Miriam Webster (2)	7
Welcome in This Place	Miriam Webster	God He Reigns (1)	9 (CD 1)
"What a Beautiful Name	Brooke Ligertwood; Ben Fielding	Let There Be Light	5
What a Friend I've Found	Martin Smith	UP: Unified Praise	10
What a Saviour	Chris Davenport; Joel Houston	Open Heaven / River Wild	6
What Child Is This	traditional; arranged by: Peter King	Celebrating Christmas	10
What Love Is (Because You Died)	Joel Houston	Are We There Yet?	10
What the Lord has Done in Me	Reuben Morgan	By Your Side (1)	6
What the Lord has Done in Me	Reuben Morgan	Extravagant Worship: The Songs of Reuben Morgan (1)	11 (CD 2)
What the Lord has Done in Me	Reuben Morgan	Songs for Communion (2)	13
What the Lord has Done in Me	Reuben Morgan	The Platinum Collection Volume 1: Shout to the Lord (1)	8 (CD 1)
What the World Will Never Take	Matt Crocker; Scott Ligertwood; Marty Sampson	God He Reigns (2)	5 (CD 2)
What the World Will Never Take	Matt Crocker; Scott Ligertwood; Marty Sampson	Look to You (1)	8
Whenever I See	Geoff Bullock	Friends in High Places	5
When I Lost My Heart to You (Hallelujah)	Joel Houston	Empires	6
Where the Love Lasts Forever	Joel Houston	Jesus Is (2)	11
Where the Love Lasts Forever	Joel Houston	Jesus Is: Remix (3)	7
Where the Love Lasts Forever	Joel Houston	More Than Life (1)	9
When the Fight Calls	Aodhán King; Melodie Wagner; Michael Fatkin; Scott Ligertwood	Youth Revival	8
Where the Spirit of the Lord Is	Ben Fielding	Glorious Ruins	5
Where We Belong	Reuben Morgan; Joel Davies	This Is Our God	12
Where You Are	Alexander Pappas; Aodhán King; Benjamin Hastings; Michael Fatkin	Where You Are – Single	Single
Where You Are	Alexander Pappas; Aodhán King; Benjamin Hastings; Michael Fatkin	Youth Revival	1
Where You Are (Radio Version)	Alexander Pappas; Aodhán King; Benjamin Hastings; Michael Fatkin	Youth Revival	13
Window of Heaven	Colin Battersby	The Plan	1
With All I Am	Reuben Morgan	For All You've Done	4 (CD 1)
With Christ	Mia Fieldes	Songs for Communion	7
With Everything	Joel Houston	This Is Our God	16
With Us	Reuben Morgan; Dylan Thomas	God Is Able	2
With You	Reuben Morgan	Blessed	11
Within Your Love	Geoff Bullock	Stone's Been Rolled Away	12
Wonder	Raymond Badham; Amanda Fergusson	Faithful	5
The Wonder Of Your Love	Jack Mooring; Leeland Mooring; Marty Sampson	Faith + Hope + Love	9
Wonderful God	Ned Davies	God He Reigns	6 (CD 1)
Worthy Is the Lamb	Darlene Zschech	Extravagant Worship: The Songs of Darlene Zschech (2)	11 (CD 1)
Worthy Is the Lamb	Darlene Zschech	Songs for Communion (4)	11
Worthy Is the Lamb	Darlene Zschech	The Platinum Collection Volume 2: Shout to the Lord 2 (1)	9 (CD 2)
Worthy Is the Lamb	Darlene Zschech	Ultimate Worship (3)	16
Worthy Is the Lamb	Darlene Zschech	UP: Unified Praise (3)	4
Worthy Is the Lamb	Darlene Zschech	You Are My World (1)	11

== X ==
No song titles begin with X.

== Y ==
Title	Author	Album	Track
Yahweh	Reuben Morgan	Faith + Hope + Love	6
Yes and Amen	Russell Fragar	Touching Heaven Changing Earth	8
You (1)	Dylan Thomas; Paul Andrew	All Of The Above	13
You (2)	Joel Houston	A Beautiful Exchange	8
You Alone Are God	Ben Fielding; Reuben Morgan	Mighty to Save	4
You Are Faithful	Miriam Webster	Extravagant Worship: The Songs of Miriam Webster (2)	9
You Are Faithful	Miriam Webster	Saviour King (1)	13
You Are Here (The Same Power)	Dave George	This Is Our God	9
You Are Holy	Reuben Morgan	Extravagant Worship: The Songs of Reuben Morgan (1)	4 (CD 2)
You Are Holy	Reuben Morgan	Forever (2)	8
You Are Holy	Reuben Morgan	The Platinum Collection Volume 2: Shout to the Lord 2 (1)	4 (CD 1)
You Are Holy	Reuben Morgan	Touching Heaven Changing Earth (1)	6
You Are Holy Lord	Renate Koch; Bruce Robertson	Chosen One	5
You Are More	Harrison J. Wood	God Is Able	8
You Are My God	Geoff Bullock; Gail Dunshea	The Power of Your Love	12
You Are My Lord	Katia Bowley; Reuben Morgan	Chosen One	6
You Are My Rock (1)	Geoff Bullock	The Power of Your Love	6
You Are My Rock (2)	Gio Galanti; Natasha Bedingfield	Shout God's Fame	4
You Are My Strength	Reuben Morgan	Saviour King	4
You Are My World	Marty Sampson	Forever (2)	3
You Are My World	Marty Sampson	Super Strong God (4)	12 (medley; chorus)
You Are My World	Marty Sampson	The Platinum Collection Volume 2: Shout to the Lord 2 (1)	6 (CD 2)
You Are My World	Marty Sampson	You Are My World (1)	7
You Are Near	Reuben Morgan	Extravagant Worship: The Songs of Reuben Morgan (1)	6 (CD 1)
You Are Near	Reuben Morgan	Forever (2)	4
You Are Near	Reuben Morgan	For This Cause (1)	5
You Are Near	Reuben Morgan	The Platinum Collection Volume 2: Shout to the Lord 2 (1)	7 (CD 1)
You Are the One	Geoff Bullock	Stone's Been Rolled Away	14
You Are Worthy	Darlene Zschech	For All You've Done	7 (CD 1)
You Are / You Are Lord	Darlene Zschech; Jennifer Va'a	Hope	9 (CD 1)
You Crown the Year (Psalm 65:11)	Brooke Fraser; Reuben Morgan	Glorious Ruins	12
You Deserve	Matt Crocker; James Dunlop	This Is Our God	10
You Deserve	Matt Crocker; James Dunlop	In a Valley by the Sea	1
You Gave Me Love	Reuben Morgan	Touching Heaven Changing Earth	9
You Give Me Shelter	Geoff Bullock	Stone's Been Rolled Away	2
You Hold Me Now	Reuben Morgan	Tear Down the Walls	9
You Hold Me Now	Reuben Morgan	Faith + Hope + Love	13
You Never Fail	Brandon Carter; Chris Davenport; Joel Houston	Glorious Ruins	3
You Placed Your Love	Geoff Bullock	The Power of Your Love	3
You Reign	Matt Crocker	In a Valley by the Sea	5
You Rescued Me	Geoff Bullock	People Just Like Us	5
You Said	Reuben Morgan	By Your Side (1)	10
You Said	Reuben Morgan	Extravagant Worship: The Songs of Reuben Morgan (1)	7 (CD 1)
You Said	Reuben Morgan	The Platinum Collection Volume 1: Shout to the Lord (1)	15 (CD 2)
You Saw Me	Reuben Morgan; Ben Fielding; Mia Fieldes	Saviour King	10
You Shine	Russell Fragar	Simply Worship 3	11
You Stand Alone	Mark Stevens; Steve McPherson	You Are My World	5
You Take Me Higher	Raymond Badham	Everyday	7
You Will Always Be	Steve McPherson	Jump to the Jam	12
Your Eyes	David Wakerley; Beci Wakerley; Julia A'Bell	Jesus Is My Superhero	14
Your Love (1)	Geoff Bullock	The Power of Your Love	4
Your Love (2)	Reuben Morgan	All Things Are Possible (1)	13
Your Love (2)	Reuben Morgan	Extravagant Worship: The Songs of Reuben Morgan (1)	5 (CD 2)
Your Love (2)	Reuben Morgan	Simply Worship 3 (1)	2
Your Love Is Beautiful	Reuben Morgan; Raymond Badham; Steve Mcpherson; Nigel Hendroff	Extravagant Worship: The Songs of Reuben Morgan (1)	3 (CD 1)
Your Love Is Beautiful	Reuben Morgan; Raymond Badham; Steve Mcpherson; Nigel Hendroff	The Platinum Collection Volume 2: Shout to the Lord 2 (1)	1 (CD 2)
Your Love Is Beautiful	Reuben Morgan; Raymond Badham; Steve Mcpherson; Nigel Hendroff	You Are My World (1)	1
Your Love Keeps Following Me	Russell Fragar	Hills Praise (1)	11
Your Love Keeps Following Me	Russell Fragar	People Just Like Us (1)	8
Your Love Keeps Following Me	Russell Fragar	The Platinum Collection Volume 1: Shout to the Lord (1)	6 (CD 2)
Your Name	Darlene Zschech	Stone's Been Rolled Away	3
Your Name High	Joel Houston	Tear Down the Walls	11
Your Name High	Joel Houston	This Is Our God	1
Your People Sing Praises	Russell Fragar	God Is in the House (1)	10
Your People Sing Praises	Russell Fragar	Hills Praise (1)	1
Your Spirit	Luke Munns	King of Majesty	4
Your Unfailing Love	Reuben Morgan	By Your Side (2)	4
Your Unfailing Love	Reuben Morgan	Extravagant Worship: The Songs of Reuben Morgan (2)	6 (CD 2)
Your Unfailing Love	Reuben Morgan	Touching Heaven Changing Earth (1)	4
Yours Forever	Joel Davies; Braden Lang	Tear Down the Walls	12
You'll Come	Brooke Fraser	The I Heart Revolution: With Hearts as One (1)	7
You'll Come	Brooke Fraser	This Is Our God (2)	14
You're All I Need	Geoff Bullock	Friends in High Places	7
You're Here with Me	Jonas Myrin	Shout God's Fame	5
You're in My Heart	Reuben Morgan	Overwhelmed	5
You're the One	Gio Galanti; Natasha Bedingfield	Jesus Is My Superhero	9
Yours Is the Kingdom	Joel Houston	God He Reigns	8 (CD 1)

== Z ==
Title	Author	Album	Track
Zion (Interlude)	Hillsong United	Zion (Deluxe Edition)	9

== Note ==
Nameless, instrumental-only tracks such as introductions are not listed. These include:

- People Just Like Us: track 1
- To the Ends of the Earth: track 1
- United We Stand: tracks 1, 7, 9 and 16 (labelled as Selah, Hebrew for 'pause' or 'reflection')
- Aftermath: track 6

== See also ==
- Hillsong Church
- Hillsong musicians
- List of Hillsong albums
