= Extravagant Worship: The Songs of Reuben Morgan =

Compilation album by Hillsong Church
- Released: 2002
- Genre: Contemporary worship music
- Length: 112:48
- Label: Hillsong Music Australia
- Producers: Darlene Zschech, Reuben Morgan and the Hillsong team

Hillsong Music Australia Compilation albums chronology
Extravagant Worship: The Songs of Darlene Zschech (2002)	Extravagant Worship: The Songs of Reuben Morgan (2002)	The Platinum Collection Volume 1: Shout to the Lord (2003)

Extravagant Worship: The Songs of Reuben Morgan is a compilation praise and worship album of contemporary worship music by the Hillsong Church. Cross Rhythms reviewer John Baugh wonder "why this collection needs to be released apart from 'If you liked ... then you will like ... '", but concluded that apart from that minor complaint, "the album itself is of course great if somewhat unsurprising".

== Album details ==
All tracks on this double-CD album have been written (or co-written) by Hillsong worship leader, Reuben Morgan. All tracks are taken directly from previous Hillsong Music Australia and Integrity Music Inc. albums. The album includes Morgan's hit song "I Give You My Heart."

== Track listing ==
All songs, words and music by Reuben Morgan, except where noted.

Disc one

1. "Hear Our Praises" (from Shout to the Lord 2000) – 5:37
2. "One Day" (from For This Cause) – 4:06
3. "Your Love Is Beautiful" (Morgan, Steve McPherson & Nigel Hendroff; from You Are My World) – 4:25
4. "Eagle's Wings" (from Shout to the Lord 2000) – 4:36
5. "My Heart Will Trust" (from Shout to the Lord 2000) – 5:00
6. "You Are Near" (from For This Cause) – 6:11
7. "You Said" (from By Your Side) – 4:35
8. "Heaven" (from Everyday) – 4:49
9. "In Your Hands" (from All Things Are Possible) – 6:12
10. "Jesus' Generation" (from Best Friend) – 5:11
11. "Touching Heaven Changing Earth" (from Touching Heaven Changing Earth) – 3:55

Disc two

1. "My Redeemer Lives" (from By Your Side) – 4:01
2. "This Is How We Overcome" (from By Your Side) – 3:32
3. "Faith" (from For This Cause) – 3:50
4. "You Are Holy" (from Touching Heaven Changing Earth) – 5:32
5. "Your Love" (from All Things Are Possible) – 5:38
6. "Your Unfailing Love" (from By Your Side) – 6:29
7. "I Belong to You" (from Simply Worship 2) – 5:05
8. "Glory to God" (from Christmas) – 5:18
9. "On the Lord's Day" (from Everyday) – 5:42
10. "I Give You My Heart" (from God Is in the House) – 7:51
11. "What the Lord Has Done in Me" (from By Your Side) – 5:04

== See also ==
- World Through Your Eyes: solo albums by Morgan.
