= The Platinum Collection Volume 1: Shout to the Lord =

The Platinum Collection Volume 1: Shout to the Lord (Featuring Darlene Zschech)

Compilation album by Hillsong Church
- Released: 2000
- Genre: Contemporary worship music
- Length: 149:57
- Label: Hillsong Music Australia
- Producer: Darlene Zschech and the Hillsong team

Hillsong Music Australia Compilation albums chronology
Extravagant Worship: The Songs of Reuben Morgan (2001)	The Platinum Collection Volume 1: Shout to the Lord (Featuring Darlene Zschech) (2000)	The Platinum Collection Volume 2: Shout to the Lord 2 (2003)

The Platinum Collection Volume 1: Shout to the Lord is a compilation praise and worship album of contemporary worship music by the Hillsong Church. The album appeared on the Billboard 200 and reached No. 8 on the Top Contemporary Christian Albums Chart.

== Track listing ==
Disc 1:

1. "People Just Like Us" (Russell Fragar; from People Just Like Us)
2. "He's Real (All the Power You Need)" (Fragar; from Shout to the Lord)
3. "My Redeemer Lives" (Reuben Morgan; from By Your Side)
4. "Church On Fire" (Fragar; from Touching Heaven Changing Earth)
5. "Joy in the Holy Ghost" (Fragar; from God Is in the House)
6. "Show Me Your Ways" (Fragar; from Shout to the Lord)
7. "I Will Run to You" (Darlene Zschech; from God Is in the House)
8. "What the Lord has Done in Me" (Morgan; from By Your Side)
9. "Jesus, You Gave it All" (Zschech; from Touching Heaven Changing Earth)
10. "I Give You My Heart" (Morgan; from God Is in the House)
11. "The Potter's Hand" (Zschech; from Touching Heaven Changing Earth)
12. "Jesus, Lover of My Soul" (John Ezzy, Daniel Grul and Steve McPherson; from Shout to the Lord)
13. "Dwelling Places" (Miriam Webster; from By Your Side)
14. "The Great Southland" (Geoff Bullock; from The Power of Your Love)
15. "Hear Our Praises" (Morgan; from Shout to the Lord 2000)

Disc 2:

1. "All Things Are Possible" (Zschech; from All Things Are Possible)
2. "I Believe the Promise" (Fragar; from God Is in the House)
3. "Touching Heaven, Changing Earth" (Morgan; from Touching Heaven Changing Earth)
4. "God Is in the House" (Fragar & Zschech; from God Is in the House)
5. "This is How We Overcome" (Morgan; from By Your Side)
6. "Your Love Keeps Following Me" (Fragar; from People Just Like Us)
7. "Jesus What a Beautiful Name" (Tanya Riches; from God Is in the House)
8. "The Power of Your Love" (Bullock; from The Power of Your Love)
9. "Eagles Wings" (Morgan; from By Your Side)
10. "And That My Soul Knows Very Well" (Zschech; from God Is in the House)
11. "Shout to the Lord" (Zschech; from Shout to the Lord)
12. "Love You So Much" (Fragar; from All Things Are Possible)
13. "Holy Spirit Rain Down" (Fragar; from Touching Heaven Changing Earth)
14. "So You Would Come" (Fragar; from All Things Are Possible)
15. "You Said" (Morgan; from By Your Side)
16. "Can't Stop Talking" (Fragar; from All Things Are Possible)
17. "That's What We Came Here For" (Fragar & Zschech; from Touching Heaven Changing Earth)

== Reception ==
James D. Davis, of the South Florida Sun Sentinel, called the album "well done, if occasionally forced and overproduced".
