= I Give You My Heart =

I Give You My Heart may refer to:

- "I Give You My Heart" (Hillsong song), 1996
- "I Give You My Heart" (Mr. President song), 1996

== See also ==
- "Give U My Heart", 1992 song by Babyface featuring Toni Braxton
- "I Give My Heart to You", a song by Billy Ray Cyrus on the 1998 album Shot Full of Love
- "If I Give My Heart to You", a 1954 song
