= Amazing Love =

Amazing Love may refer to:

== Music ==
=== Albums ===
- Amazing Love (Hillsong album), a 2002 album from Hillsong Church
- Amazing Love (Graham Kendrick album), a 1990 Christian live album
- Amazing Love, a 1973 album by Charley Pride
- Amazing Love, a 2005 album by Chris Jasper

=== Songs ===
- "Amazing Love" (song), a 1973 song by Charley Pride
- "Amazing Love", a 2002 song by Hillsong from Amazing Love
- "Amazing Love", a 1990 song by Graham Kendrick from Amazing Love
- "Amazing Love", a 2004 song by Michelle Williams from Do You Know
- "Amazing Love", by Phil Perry
- "Amazing Love", a 1959 song by Joe Williams
- "You Are My King (Amazing Love)", a 2001 song by Phillips, Craig and Dean; also recorded by Newsboys

== Other uses ==
- Amazing Love: The Story of Hosea, a Christian film from Five & Two Pictures
