= Hills Praise =

Compilation album by Hillsong Church
- Released: 1997
- Recorded: Various
- Genre: Contemporary Christian
- Length: 47:20
- Label: Hillsong Music Australia
- Producer: Russell Fragar and Darlene Zschech

Hillsong Music Australia Compilation albums chronology
Hills Praise (1997)	Extravagant Worship: The Songs of Darlene Zschech (2001)

Hills Praise is a compilation praise and worship album of Christian Contemporary music by the Hillsong Church.

== Album details ==
All songs on this CD album are taken directly from previous Hillsong Music Australia and Integrity Music Inc. albums.

== Reception ==
In June 1998 Dave Derbyshire of Cross Rhythms rated the album as 8 out of 10 and described the group as "a talented praise band of guitars, drums and the like and a choir complete with red robes". He summarised the album with "If you want some upbeat songs to let rip in praise to God, then slap this album into your CD player and dance around the living room". In April 1998 CCM Magazine rated it as 8 out of 10 and noted that "Happy, joyful, full of life and energy, were just a few of the phrases that sprang to mind during the first couple of songs".

== Track listing ==
1. "Your People Sing Praises" (Russell Fragar; from God Is in the House)
2. "People Just Like Us" (Fragar; from People Just Like Us)
3. "He's Real" (Fragar; from Shout to the Lord)
4. "Father of Lights" (Fragar; from People Just Like Us)
5. "Praise His Holy Name" (Darlene Zschech; from Friends in High Places)
6. "I Can't Wait" (Fragar; from Friends in High Places)
7. "My Heart Sings Praises" (Fragar; from God Is in the House)
8. "God Is in the House" (Fragar & Zschech; from God Is in the House)
9. "Can't Stop Talking" (Fragar; from All Things Are Possible)
10. "Shelter House" (Steve McPherson; from All Things Are Possible)
11. "Your Love Keeps Following Me" (Fragar; from People Just Like Us)
12. "Longin' for Your Touch" (Paul Iannuzzelli & Tim Uluirewa; from People Just Like Us)
13. "He Shall be Called" (Fragar; from Friends in High Places)
14. "Joy in the Holy Ghost" (Fragar; from God Is in the House)
