= Briana Scott =

American singer-songwriter

- Born: Phoenix, Arizona, U.S.
- Genres: CCM, Gospel, Praise & Worship, Inspirational, Soul music
- Occupation: Singer-songwriter
- Labels: Briana Scott Music
- Website: www.brianascottmusic.com

Briana Scott (pronounced Bry'nuh) is an American contemporary Christian music solo singer-songwriter.

== Biography ==
Scott, a native of Phoenix, Arizona, began singing as a child at Emmanuel Church under the leadership of the late Bishop Felton King. She went on to become a lead singer in a number of choirs and groups throughout the Phoenix metropolitan area as well as nationally.

In 2005, she released her debut album, "While I’m Here", which earned her 2 Stellar Award nominations as well as 4 GMA Dove Award nominations in 2007. Though the project featured many great songs, the most prominent songs included: While I’m Here, Clean Heart and of course the worship medley featuring Here I Am to Worship and I Give You My Heart, penned by Tim Hughes and Hillsong's Reuben Morgan, respectively.

In 2008, she released her second musical offering, a Christmas album titled "O What A Night" that invites everyone to celebrate the birth of Jesus Christ. It features popular songs that we have all come to know and love and soulfully merges gospel influences with multiple genres. It includes a rendition of Donny Hathaway’s "This Christmas" and "Who Would Imagine A King" (a beautiful song made popular by Whitney Houston). The project has earned Briana a 2009 Stellar Award nomination for Special Event CD of the Year.

She has appeared on TBN (Trinity Broadcasting Network) and on the Gospel of Music with Jeff Majors Show, which is aired on TV One, a cable and satellite network founded by Cathy Hughes.

She has worked with, among others, The Clark Sisters, Tramaine Hawkins, Stevie Wonder, The Winans, and Sandi Patty.

She currently resides in Phoenix with her husband and their two sons. In addition to being an anointed psalmist and writer; Briana is a student of the word. "The word of God is my song;" therefore, "Let my heart be sound in thy statutes; that I be not ashamed" (Psalms 119:80).

== Discography ==
Albums

Album information
While I'm Here
- Released: November 7, 2006
- Label: Briana Scott Music / Central South Distribution

Album information
O What A Night
- Released: October 28, 2008
- Label: Briana Scott Music / Central South Distribution

Album information
Nothing Compares
- Released: TBD
- Label: Briana Scott Music
- Single(s): "There Is A River", "Hello", "Nothing Compares"

Guest Appearances

- Celia King: "This Is My Story" (Briana Scott – lead vocals on Fall Fresh On Me,

recorded live at River of Life Church-Phoenix,

- Bridgette Kern: "Broken Spirit" (Briana Scott – lead & background vocals on Feeling Sentimental,

recorded with the former female gospel group Persuaded, which featured Briana Scott, Celia King, and Bridgette Kern)

- Bridgette Kern: "Broken Spirit" (Briana Scott – background vocals & vocal ad-libs throughout on I Am,

recorded with the former female gospel group Persuaded, which featured Briana Scott, Celia King, and Bridgette Kern)

- Bridgette Kern: "Broken Spirit" (Briana Scott – background vocals on Missing My Time With You)
- Studio session singer for Israel Houghton.

== Awards and nominations ==
- Stellar Awards
  - 2007, New Artist of the Year – While I'm Here (Nomination)
  - 2009, Special Event CD of the Year – O What A Night (Nomination)
- GMA Dove Awards
  - 2007, Inspirational Album of the Year – While I'm Here (Nomination)
  - 2007, Inspirational Recorded Song of the Year – While I'm Here (Nomination)
  - 2007, Urban Recorded Song of the Year – Brand New Day (Nomination)
  - 2007, Urban Recorded Song of the Year – Clean Heart (Nomination)
