= Stone's Been Rolled Away =

Live album by Hillsong Church
- Released: 4 July 1993
- Recorded: January – July 1993
- Venue: Hills Entertainment Centre, Castle Hill, Sydney, Australia
- Genre: Contemporary worship music
- Length: 54:18
- Label: Hillsong
- Producer: Russell Fragar and Geoff Bullock

Hillsong Music Australia Live praise & worship chronology
The Power of Your Love (1992)	Stone's Been Rolled Away (1993)	People Just Like Us (1994)

Stone's Been Rolled Away is the second album in the live praise and worship series of contemporary worship music by Hillsong Church. In 1997 the album was certified gold by Australian Recording Industry Association (ARIA) for shipment of 35000 units.

== Making of the album ==
Stone's Been Rolled Away was recorded live by Geoff Bullock, Darlene Zschech and the Hillsong team. This is the first album from Hillsong Church that was released on video as well as CD, Cassette and Music Book.

== Album design ==
Stone's Been Rolled Away was designed by Wyld Concepts Graphics & Promotions. The front cover features a Ken Duncan panograph of sand dunes. The cover artwork uses Times New Roman font for the title.

Several of the songs were written by Geoff Bullock.

Russell Fragar, Darlene Zschech, Robert & Debbie Eastwood, David Willersdorf, Daniel Grul, John Ezzy & Steve McPherson contributed to songs also.

== Reception ==
In August 1999 Mike Rimmer of Cross Rhythms rated the album as 5 out of 10 and described the album as "There are a few classic songs that turn up here including the title song 'Jesus Lover of My Soul' and 'I Believe'. A couple of lovely moments but in truth this is far too ordinary to justify you spending your dosh here".

== Track listing ==
1. "The Stone's Been Rolled Away" (Geoff Bullock) - Lead Vocal: Darlene Zschech, b. Geoff Bullock
2. "You Give Me Shelter" (Geoff Bullock) - Lead Vocal: Sylvia Pettit & Steve McPherson
3. "Your Name" (Darlene Zschech) - Lead Vocals: David Evans, Sylvia Pettit & Darlene Zschech
4. "I Bow My Knee (I'll Love You More)" (Robert & Debbie Eastwood) - Lead Vocals: Sylvia Pettit & David Evans
5. "Let Your Presence Fall" (David Willersdorf) - Lead Vocal: Darlene Zschech, b. David Evans
6. "Holy Spirit Come" (Bullock) - Lead Vocals: Geoff Bullock, Darlene Zschech, David Evans, Steve McPherson & Sylvia Pettit
7. "Holy One of God" (Bullock) - Lead Vocals: Darlene Zschech, b. David Evans
8. "I Believe" (Bullock) - Lead Vocals: Darlene Zschech & Steve McPherson
9. "Make Me Your Servant" (Russell Fragar) - Lead Vocals: Darlene Zschech, David Evans & Steve McPherson
10. "Jesus Lover of My Soul" (Daniel Grul, John Ezzy & Steve McPherson) - Lead Vocal: Darlene Zschech, b. David Evans
11. "Oh Holy Spirit" (Bullock) - Lead Vocals: Geoff Bullock & Darlene Zschech
12. "Within Your Love" (Bullock) - Lead Vocals: Sylvia Pettit, b. Geoff Bullock
13. "I Surrender" (Bullock) - Lead Vocals: Sylvia Pettit, b. Steve McPherson
14. "You Are the One" (Bullock) - Lead Vocals: Darlene Zschech

(b. = Lead Backing Vocal)

== Credits ==
Worship Leader/Pastor

- Geoff Bullock

Music Director

- Russell Fragar

Vocal Director

- Darlene Zschech

Choir Directors

- Annabelle Smart, Janine Bullock

Lead Vocals

- Darlene Zschech
- Steve McPherson
- David Evans
- Sylvia Pettit

Backing Vocals

- Lucy Fisher
- Donia Makedonez
- Rebecca King
- Steve Ollis
- Deborah de Jong
- Gail Dunshea
- Debbie Steinhardt
- Nicholas Hood
- Scott Haslem

Choir

- Hills Christian Life Centre Singers

Piano

- Geoff Bullock

Keyboards

- Russell Fragar

Guitars

- David Moyse, Allan Chard

Acoustic Guitar (Unplugged)

- Matthew Wakeling

Bass Guitar

- Paul Ewing

Drums

- Adam Simek

Percussion

- Stuart Fell

Executive Producer

- Brian Houston

Producers

- Geoff Bullock, Russell Fragar

Engineers

- Jeff Todd, Russell Fragar

Assistant Engineer

- Andrew McPherson

Production Manager

- Cameron Wade

Front Of House Engineer

- Nick Asha

Foldback Engineer

- Peter Manlik
