= World Through Your Eyes =

Studio album by Reuben Morgan
- Released: November 2004
- Recorded: 2004–2005
- Genre: Contemporary worship music
- Length: 47:06
- Label: Rocketown
- Producer: Reuben Morgan; Paul Mabury

Reuben Morgan chronology
| World Through Your Eyes (2004) | Everyone (2006) |

Professional ratings
Review scores
| Source | Rating |
|---|---|
| Jesus Freak Hideout | 4/5 stars |

World Through Your Eyes is an album of Christian music by Reuben Morgan released in Australia in November 2004 and in the United States in September 2005. The American version differs from the Australian release, with extra tracks and remastered versions of songs from the original release.

== Track listing ==
All songs by Reuben Morgan, except where noted.

Australian Release

1. [++] (Introduction) – 0:30
2. "World Through Your Eyes" – 4:00
3. "Stand" – 3:51
4. [++] (Transition) – 0:28
5. "The Fear" – 3:12
6. "Gloria" – 4:10
7. "All I Am" – 4:39
8. "Waterfall" – 4:15
9. [++] (Transition) – 0:36
10. "Christ Divine" (Morgan, Mia Fieldes) – 4:31
11. "Keep Me" – 3:37
12. "Shine" – 4:09
13. "In Over My Head" – 4:18
14. "Waiting Here" – 4:44

US Release

1. "My Redeemer Lives" – 3:21
2. "Hear Our Praises" – 3:47
3. "All the Heavens" – 3:47
4. "I Give You My Heart" – 3:45
5. "Waterfall" – 4:16
6. "All I Am" – 4:17
7. "Stand" – 3:52
8. "The Fear" – 3:12
9. "World Through Your Eyes" – 3:40
10. "Gloria" – 3:52
11. "Waiting Here" – 4:39

== Personnel ==
- Reuben Morgan – vocals, backing vocals, acoustic guitars, electric guitars
- Peter James – keyboards, acoustic piano
- Nic Manders – keyboards, acoustic piano
- Michael Guy Chislett – electric guitars
- Ben Fielding – electric guitars (US release)
- Kerry "Hikanui" Booth – bass
- Paul Mabury – drums
- Andy Sorenson – string arrangements
- Keith Getty – orchestral arrangements (4) (US release)
- Joni McCabe – orchestra conductor (4) (US release)
- City of Prague Philharmonic Orchestra – orchestra (4) (US release)
- Phil Joel – backing vocals (US release)
- Randall Waller – backing vocals

=== Production ===
- Reuben Morgan – executive producer, producer
- Paul Mabury – producer

US release

- Kieren Kendressey – engineer
- Nic Manders – engineer
- Andy Sorenson – string engineer, drum engineer (7, 9)
- Phil Buston – drum engineer (7, 9)
- Blair Simmons – assistant drum engineer (7, 9)
- Tom Laune – mixing at Bridgeway Studios (Franklin, Tennessee)
- Richard Dodd – mastering
- Richard Langton – project manager
- John Andrade – art direction
- Josh Reeder – design

Australian release

- Nic Manders – engineer
- Andy Sorenson – string engineer, drum engineer (2, 3)
- Phil Buston – drum engineer (2, 3)
- Blair Simmons – assistant drum engineer (2, 3)
- Shane D. Wilson – mixing at Pentavarit (Nashville, Tennessee)
- Jim DeMain – mastering at Yes Master (Nashville, Tennessee)
- Richard Langton – project manager
- Sarah Morgan – project manager
- Giles Iambert – creative director, styling
- Martin & Co. – styling assistant
- Mel Nielsen – styling assistant
- David Anderson – photography

== See also ==
- Extravagant Worship: The Songs of Reuben Morgan
