= Overwhelmed =

2014 song performed by Big Daddy Weave

Single by Big Daddy Weave

from the album Love Come to Life
- Released: 2014
- Recorded: 2011–12
- Genre: CCM
- Length: 5:29 (album version); 4:47 (radio version); 4:25 (album edit)
- Label: Fervent Records
- Songwriter(s): Johnny Redmond; Big Daddy Weave

Big Daddy Weave singles chronology
"The Only Name (Yours Will Be)" (2013)	"Overwhelmed" (2014)	"My Story" (2015)

Music video
- "Overwhelmed" on YouTube

Overwhelmed is a single from the Christian rock group Big Daddy Weave. It debuted at No. 31 and peaked at No. 3 on the Billboard Christian Airplay chart.

== Music video ==
The music video for the single "Overwhelmed" was released on August 7, 2014. The video features shots of animals and African children. At the end of the video, the band performs in front of them.

== Charts ==
=== Weekly charts ===
Chart (2015)	Peak position
US Christian AC (Billboard)	1
US Christian Airplay (Billboard)	5
US Hot Christian Songs (Billboard)	5
US Christian AC Indicator (Billboard)|	2
US Christian Soft AC (Billboard)	1

=== Year-end charts ===
Chart (2014)	Peak position
US Christian Songs (Billboard)	19
US Christian Airplay (Billboard)	21
US Christian AC (Billboard)	23
Chart (2015)	Peak position
US Christian Songs (Billboard)	31
US Christian Airplay (Billboard)	18
US Christian AC (Billboard)	9

== Certifications ==
Region	Certification	Certified units/sales
United States (RIAA)	Gold	500,000^{‡}
^{‡} Sales+streaming figures based on certification alone.
