= The Power of Your Love =

Live album by Hillsong Church
- Released: 5 July 1992
- Recorded: January – July 1992
- Venue: Hills Entertainment Centre, Castle Hill, Sydney, Australia
- Genre: Contemporary worship music
- Length: 56:42
- Label: Hillsong
- Producer: Darlene Zschech, Russell Fragar and Geoff Bullock

Hillsong Music Australia Live praise & worship chronology
The Power of Your Love (1992)	Stone's Been Rolled Away (1993)

The Power of Your Love is the first live contemporary worship album released by Hillsong Music — the first album in the live praise and worship series of contemporary worship music released by the label.

== Production ==
All of the 16 songs for the album were written and composed by Geoff Bullock, the then Worship Pastor of Hillsong Church. It was recorded live by Bullock, Darlene Zschech, and the Hillsong team.

The cover was designed by a local design firm in Sydney (City GraphX).

The font used for the title is Futura. The front cover is a panograph taken by Christian photographer; Ken Duncan. His panographs are seen on three other Hillsong album covers. There are no photographs of the actual live service in the original CD sleeve design. The updated version shows "what's new from Hillsong Music Australia" and the new Hillsongs logo throughout.

== Release ==
The Power Of Your Love was released in 1992 by Hillsongs Australia (previously Power Ministries International). The album was available on CD, Cassette and Music Book.

== Reception ==
In June 1993, Tony Cummings of Cross Rhythms rated the album as 7 out of 10 and described the group as willing to "take on the full hard rocking armoury of AOR to shout praises to God". He summarised the album with "What they lack in subtlety they make up for in exuberance ... Recommended to radical worshippers".

In 2000, the album was certified gold by Australian Recording Industry Association (ARIA) for shipment of 35,000 units.

== Track listing ==
1. "The Time Has Come" (Geoff Bullock)
2. "We Will Rise" (Bullock)
3. "You Placed Your Love" (Bullock)
4. "Your Love" (Bullock)
5. "Blessed Be" (Bullock)
6. "You Are My Rock" (Bullock)
7. "Hear Me Calling" (Bullock)
8. "Refresh My Heart" (Bullock)
9. "The Power of Your Love" (Bullock)
10. "Lord We Come" (Bullock)
11. "I Will Worship You" (Bullock)
12. "You Are My God" (Bullock & Gail Dunshea)
13. "Holy Spirit Rise" (Bullock)
14. "Glory" (Bullock)
15. "Latter Rain" (Bullock)
16. "The Great Southland" (Bullock)

== Credits ==
- Geoff Bullock - worship pastor, piano, vocals
- Russell Fragar - keyboards, music director
- Darlene Zschech - vocals, vocal producer
- David Evans - vocals
- David Moyse - guitar
- Allan Chard - guitar
- Andy James - bass
- Adam Simek - drums
- Stuart Fell - percussion
- Jeff Todd - engineer, mixer
- Andrew McPherson - assistant engineer
- William Bowden - mastering
- Cameron Wade - production manager
- Nick Asha - front of house Manager
- Chris Googe - foldback engineer
- Brian Houston - executive producer
- Michael Murphy - executive producer
