= Celebrating Christmas =

Studio album by Hillsong Church
- Released: 2005
- Genre: Contemporary worship music, Christmas
- Length: 48:02
- Label: Hillsong Music Australia
- Producer: Darlene Zschech, Steve McPherson

Hillsong Music Australia Christmas albums chronology
Christmas (2001)	Celebrating Christmas (2005)	Born Is the King (2011)

Celebrating Christmas is the second Christmas worship album of contemporary worship music composed of Christmas songs led by Darlene Zschech and the Hillsong Team. The album appeared on the Billboard Top Heatseekers Albums Chart.

== Track listing ==
1. "Angels We Have Heard on High"/"Gloria" (traditional by Luke Munns; chorus from "Gloria" by Reuben Morgan) - lead vocals: Darlene Zschech, soprano: Keegan Joyce
2. "Joy to the World" (traditional; arranged by Craig Gower & Nigel Hendroff) - lead vocals: Erica Crocker
3. "Christmas Time Again" (Barry Southgate) - lead vocals: Barry Southgate
4. "O Rejoice" (Mia Fieldes) - lead vocals: Darlene Zschech
5. "O Come, O Come, Emmanuel" (instrumental; arranged by Hendroff)
6. "O Little Town of Bethlehem" (traditional; arranged by Peter King) - lead vocals: Holly Watson
7. "God Rest Ye Merry Gentlemen" (traditional; arranged by Ross Irwin) - lead vocals: Steve McPherson, feat. James Morrison
8. "Hark the Herald Angels Sing" (traditional; arranged by Luke-Henri Peipman & Steve McPherson - lead vocals: Barry Southgate, b. Julie Basset, Steve McPherson, Dee Ulurewa, Tulele Faletolu
9. "Emmanuel" (Raymond Badham) - lead vocals: Tulele Faletolu
10. "What Child Is This" (traditional; arranged by King) - lead vocals: Cindy Larsen
11. "Can You Hear?" (David Andrew & Fieldes) - lead vocals: Steve McPherson
12. "Saviour Christ the King" (Craig Gower) - lead vocals: Miriam Webster

== Personnel ==
- Darlene Zschech - worship pastor, executive producer, senior lead vocals, backing vocals
- Steve McPherson - producer, lead vocals, backing vocals
- Erica Crocker - lead vocals, backing vocals
- Barry Southgate - lead vocals, backing vocals
- Holly Watson - lead vocals, backing vocals
- Tulele Faletolu - lead vocals, backing vocals
- Cindy Larsen - lead vocals, backing vocals
- Miriam Webster - lead vocals, backing vocals
- Keegan Joyce - lead vocals
- Julie Basset - backing vocals
- Annie McIntosh - backing vocals
- Nathan Phillips - backing vocals
- Dee Uluirewa - backing vocals
