= Saviour King =

Live album by Hillsong Worship
- Released: 1 July 2007
- Recorded: 18 March 2007
- Venue: Acer Arena, Sydney, Australia
- Genre: Contemporary worship music
- Length: 76:44
- Label: Hillsong
- Producer: Andrew Crawford, Joel Houston, Reuben Morgan

Hillsong Music Australia Live praise & worship chronology
Mighty to Save (2006)	Saviour King (2007)	This Is Our God (2008)

Saviour King is the sixteenth album in the live praise and worship series of Christian Contemporary music by Hillsong Church. It debuted at No. 6 on the ARIA album chart on 9 July 2007, while the DVD debuted at No. 2 on the DVD chart. On the US Billboard Top Christian Albums Chart, it debuted at No. 5.

== Making of the album ==
Saviour King was recorded live at the Acer Arena on 18 March 2007 by Darlene Zschech and the Hillsong team after the annual Hillsong Colour Conference. After many years at the Sydney Entertainment Centre, Hillsong Church moved the annual live album recording to the Acer Arena. This was also the last official album to feature Steve McPherson as a vocalist. McPherson is still a part of Hillsong Church as a publisher. Also, this was the last album in which Zschech appeared as a worship pastor.

The front cover depicts Hillsong Church congregation and the Hillsong Live logo, while the inverse side depicts Darlene Zschech, Reuben Morgan, Joel Houston and Marty Sampson.

== Writing and composition ==
The album contains songs written and used in Hillsong Church from early 2006 to March 2007. Songs such as "I'm Not Ashamed" and "Here in My Life" were written earlier in 2006, while songs like "Lord of Lords", "In the Mystery" and "One Thing" were written around the time of the album recording. "Break Free", "Hosanna" and "Saviour King" were released on the Hillsong United album All of the Above.

The majority of songs were written by Marty Sampson, Reuben Morgan, Joel Houston, Brooke Fraser, Mia Fieldes and Ben Fielding. Matt Crocker from Hillsong United youth, who wrote songs on the Hillsong United EP In a Valley by the Sea, contributed to two songs.

== Track listing (CD) ==
CD
No.	Title	Writer(s)	Worship leader	Length
1.	"I'm Not Ashamed"	Paul Andrew, Dylan Thomas	Marty Sampson	04:26
2.	"Break Free"	Joel Houston, Matt Crocker, Scott Ligertwood	Joel Houston	03:55
3.	"In Your Freedom"	Marty Sampson, Raymond Badham	Marty Sampson	05:49
4.	"You Are My Strength"	Reuben Morgan	Reuben Morgan	04:27
5.	"Lord Of Lords"	Brooke Fraser	Brooke Fraser	04:34
6.	"One Thing"	Marty Sampson, Darlene Zschech	Darlene Zschech	06:17
7.	"To Know Your Name"	Matt Crocker	Jad Gillies	05:56
8.	"God Of Ages"	Ben Fielding	Darlene Zschech, Reuben Morgan	04:51
9.	"In The Mystery"	Joel Houston	Joel Houston	05:51
10.	"You Saw Me"	Reuben Morgan, Ben Fielding, Mia Fieldes	Reuben Morgan	06:19
11.	"Hosanna"	Brooke Fraser	Brooke Fraser, Darlene Zschech	06:17
12.	"Here In My Life"	Mia Fieldes	Darlene Zschech & Marcus Temu	05:54
13.	"You Are Faithful"	Miriam Webster	Darlene Zschech	04:38
14.	"Saviour King"	Marty Sampson, Mia Fieldes	Marty Sampson	07:31
Total length:				76:45

== Track listing (DVD) ==
1. "Saviour King" [introduction] (Marty Sampson)
2. "I'm Not Ashamed" (Marty Sampson)
3. "Break Free" (Joel Houston)
4. "Hosanna" (Brooke Fraser and Darlene Zschech)
5. "Here in My Life" (Darlene Zschech)
6. "You Are Faithful" (Darlene Zschech)
7. "In Your Freedom" (Marty Sampson)
8. "To Know Your Name" (Jad Gillies)
9. "In the Mystery" (Joel Houston)
10. "God of Ages" (Darlene Zschech and Reuben Morgan)
11. "You Are My Strength" (Reuben Morgan)
12. "One Thing" (Darlene Zschech)
13. "Lord of Lords" (Brooke Fraser)
14. "You Saw Me" (Reuben Morgan)
15. "Saviour King" (Marty Sampson)

== Personnel ==
- Darlene Zschech – worship pastor, executive producer, producer, senior worship leader, senior lead vocal
- Phil Dooley – creative director, executive producer
- Andrew Crawford – producer
- Joel Houston – producer, United worship leader, acoustic guitar
- Reuben Morgan – producer, worship leader, acoustic guitar, music director & arranger
- Marty Sampson – worship leader, acoustic guitar
- Jad Gillies – worship leader, acoustic guitar
- Brooke Fraser – worship leader, acoustic guitar
- Nigel Hendroff – electric guitar
- Ben Fielding – electric guitar
- Steve McPherson – other vocals
- Paul Andrew – other vocals
- Scott Bakken – other vocals
- Julie Bassett – other vocals
- Damian Bassett – other vocals
- Debbie-Ann Bax – other vocals
- Julie Cowdroy – other vocals
- Kathryn De Araujo – other vocals
- Jonathan Douglass (J.D) – other vocals
- Katie Elmore – other vocals
- Deborah Ezzy – other vocals
- Mia Fields – other vocals
- Karen Horn – other vocals
- Sam Knock – other vocals
- Kelista Puddle – other vocals
- Katie Restivo – other vocals
- Barry Southgate – other vocals
- Katrina Tadman – other vocals
- Marcus Temu – other vocals
- Aaron Watson – other vocals
- Holly Watson – other vocals
- Ryan Watts Thomas – other vocals
- Peter Kelly – percussion
- Jason Blackbourn – percussion
- Timon Klein – electric guitar
- Nigel Hendroff – electric guitar
- Raymond Badham – electric guitar
- Dylan Thomas – electric guitar
- Matthew Tennikoff – bass guitar
- Gian Peipman – bass guitar
- Ntando Mpofu – bass guitar
- Ben Whincop – bass guitar
- Dane Charles – drums
- Rolf Wam Fjell – drums
- Simon Kobler – drums
- Paul Mabury – drums
- Peter James – keyboards
- Kevin Lee – keyboards
- Peter King – keyboards
- Autumn Hardman – keyboards
- Hillsong Church Choir – choir
