= Ken Duncan (photographer) =

Australian photographer

Ken Duncan OAM
- Born: Kenneth McLeod Duncan; 20 December 1954 (age 71); Mildura, Victoria, Australia
- Occupation: Landscape photographer
- Known for: The Last Frontier — Australia Wide

Kenneth McLeod Duncan, OAM (born 20 December 1954) is an Australian photographer. He is regarded as being one of Australia's most acclaimed landscape photographers. He gained prominence for his work with panoramic landscapes and limited-edition photographic prints.

== Early years ==
Duncan was born in Mildura, Australia on the Murray River and grew up living mostly in country towns. He became interested in photography in his early teens. After leaving school, he eventually became a senior technical representative for Australia's leading photographic supply house. His particular interest in panoramic shots began when the company imported the Widelux camera, which had the ability to produce panoramic shots of his favourite landscapes. In 1981, at the age of 26, he moved to Sydney.

== Career ==
In 1982, Duncan left Sydney to travel around Australia and photograph its famed landscapes. In five years he produced more than 80,000 images. Although the panoramic format is considered his most popular, he has also used many other different formats and media. He has produced several books and has won awards for his work. His first major publication was a pictorial book called The Last Frontier — Australia Wide published in 1987 by Weldon publishers. More than 65,000 copies have been sold. His photograph of a bush homestead was used for the cover art of Midnight Oil's 1987 album, Diesel and Dust. At the 1988 ARIA Music Awards together with Creative Type Wart, Gary Morris, and Midnight Oil, he won for Best Cover Art.

In 2001, he published a book, America Wide: In God We Trust, which features landscapes of 50 U.S. states. It was completed a few days before the September 11 attacks in 2001. He published a sequel, Spirit of America, in 2006. In 2003, Ken Duncan released 3D Australia—popularising 3D printing.

In the 2009 Australia Day Honours, Duncan was awarded a Medal of the Order of Australia (OAM) by the Australian Government for his services to the arts as a landscape photographer and publisher, and for his service to the Central Coast community.

== Religious beliefs ==
Duncan is a Christian and a creationist.
