= Christmas (Hillsong album) =

Studio album by Hillsong Church
- Released: 2001
- Recorded: AMC Studios, Sydney; In House Music, Sydney; Moyst Music, Sydney
- Genre: Contemporary worship music, Christmas
- Length: 65:55
- Label: Hillsong Australia
- Producer: Darlene Zschech

Hillsong Music Australia Christmas albums chronology
Christmas (2001)	Celebrating Christmas (2005)

Christmas is the first Christmas worship album of Christian Contemporary music composed of Christmas songs by the Hillsong Church. It was released, in Australia, for Christmas in 2001 and appeared in international markets by September 2001.

== Album details ==
The songs on Christmas are renditions of popular Christmas carols and several of Hillsong Music's own songs led by Darlene Zschech & the Hillsong Team. This album has three more tracks than the earlier version of this album entitled Jesus, Christmas Worship Down Under, Hark the Herald Angels Sing, Away in a Manger and The First Noel.

== Reception ==
In September 2001 Mike Rimmer of Cross Rhythms rated the album as 8 out of 10 and described it as "their releases are always top quality ... with just less than 50% traditional carols. All the classics are here". BREATHEcast's Timothy Yap reviewed the disc in November 2013 after it was issued as part of a two-disc compilation, It's Christmas, and found the earlier material on Christmas to be superior as it has a "more cohesive feel as Darlene Zschech is featured on most of the tracks here" than the material on Celebrating Christmas (2005). In November 2001 CCM Magazine rated it as 7 out of 10 and felt "they come up with some wonderful new praise and worship songs, and breath new life into older ones".

== Track listing ==
1. "Silent Night" (traditional; arranged by Russell Fragar)
2. "Hark the Herald Angels Sing" (traditional; arranged by Peter King)
3. "Saviour of the World" (Katia Bowley)
4. "Jesus, What a Beautiful Name" (Tanya Riches)
5. "The Reason Why" (Russell Fragar)
6. "Away in a Manger" (traditional; arranged by Russell Fragar)
7. "Perfect Love" (Darlene Zschech & Russell Fragar)
8. "O Holy Night" (traditional; arranged by Reuben Morgan & Peter King)
9. "Rejoice" (Donia Makedonez)
10. "Star of Bethlehem" (instrumental; David Moyse)
11. "The First Noel" (traditional; arranged by Peter King)
12. "O Come, All Ye Faithful"/"Jesus You Are All I Live For" (traditional; arranged by Russell Fragar & Simeon Webster)
13. "Hallelujah" (Darlene Zschech)
14. "Glory to God" (Reuben Morgan)
