= Friends in High Places (Hillsong album) =

Live album by Hillsong Church
- Released: 2 July 1995
- Recorded: 19 March 1995
- Venue: The Hills Entertainment Centre, Sydney, Australia
- Genre: Contemporary worship music
- Length: 59:39
- Label: Hillsong
- Producer: Russell Fragar

Hillsong Music Australia Live praise & worship chronology
People Just Like Us (1994)	Friends in High Places (1995)	God Is in the House (1996)

Alternative cover
- Re-release cover with Darlene Zschech and the congregation added to the front.

Friends in High Places is the fourth album in the live praise and worship series of contemporary worship music by Hillsong Church. In 1999 the album was certified gold by Australian Recording Industry Association (ARIA) for shipment of 35000 units.

== Making of the album ==
Friends in High Places was recorded live at The Hills Entertainment Centre by Geoff Bullock, Darlene Zschech, and the Hillsong team. This is the final album on which Bullock appeared. He left the church later that year (1995).

The majority of the songs were written by Bullock, Zschech, and Russell Fragar.

== Reception ==
In December 1997 Peter Dilley of Cross Rhythms rated the album as 9 out of 10 and distinguished between the group and their contemporaries in United States and United Kingdom: "what sets Australian-sourced recordings apart from many US/UK worship releases is not so much their innovation as the unrestrained energy and vitality - if they're getting into a groove they really do make it funky".

== Track listing ==
1. "Friends In High Places" (Russell Fragar) — 03:51 — lead vocals: Darlene Zschech
2. "He Shall Be Called" (Fragar) — 03:00 — lead vocals: Lucy Fisher
3. "Praise His Holy Name" (Darlene Zschech) — 03:25 — lead vocals: Darlene Zschech
4. "Rock Of The Ages" (Geoff Bullock, Zschech) — 03:23 — lead vocals: Donia Makedonez
5. "Whenever I See" (Bullock) — 03:48 — lead vocals: Steve McPherson
6. "Now Is The Time" (Bullock) — 05:17 — lead vocals: Rob Eastwood
7. "You're All I Need" (Bullock) — 05:13 — lead vocals: Geoff Bullock, Darlene Zschech
8. "Salvation" (Bullock) — 03:35 — lead vocals: Darlene Zschech
9. "Holding On" (Bullock) — 03:32 — lead vocals: Darlene Zschech, Geoff Bullock
10. "Because Of Your Love" (Fragar) — 02:52 — lead vocals: Darlene Zschech b. Craig Gower
11. "King Of Kings" (Bullock) — 03:14 — lead vocals: Darlene Zschech
12. "Lord I Give Myself" (Zschech) — 02:30 — lead vocals: Darlene Zschech
13. "I'll Worship You" (Bullock) — 04:32 — lead vocals: Darlene Zschech; Geoff Bullock
14. "This Kingdom" (Bullock) — 06:01 — lead vocals: Darlene Zschech
15. "I Can't Wait" (Fragar) — 05:12 — lead vocals: Donia Makedonez; Lucy Fisher; Russell Fragar

== Credits ==
- David Moyse - guitar, engineer
- Jeff Todd - engineer
- William Bowden - mastering
- Darlene Zschech - vocals, vocal producer
- Michael Murphy - executive producer
- Megan Parker - saxophone
- Russell Fragar - piano, keyboards, vocals, producer, engineer
- Geoff Bullock - piano, vocals
- Janine Bullock - choir director
- Annabelle Chaffey - choir director
- Ruth Grant - background vocals
- Allan Chard - guitar
- Wayne Davis - bass
- Adam Simek - drums
- Stuart Fell - percussion
- Karl Stone - trombone
- Rob Eastwood - vocals
- Mark Gregory - trumpet
- Donia Makedonez - vocals
- Nick Asha - engineer
- Trevor Beck - engineer, assistant engineer
- Erica Crocker - background vocals
- Lucy Fisher - vocals
- Craig Gower - keyboards, background vocals
- Brian Houston - executive producer
- Andrew McPherson - engineer
- Steve McPherson - vocals
