= You Are My World =

Live album by Hillsong Church
- Released: 1 July 2001
- Recorded: 25 February 2001
- Venues: Sydney Entertainment Centre, Sydney, Australia
- Genre: Contemporary worship music
- Length: 73:30
- Label: Hillsong Music Australia
- Producers: Russell Fragar and Darlene Zschech

Hillsong Music Australia Live praise & worship chronology
For This Cause (2000)	You Are My World (2001)	Blessed (2002)

You Are My World is the tenth album in the live praise and worship series of contemporary worship music by Hillsong Church. The album reached the ARIA Albums Chart Top 100.

== Making of the album ==
You Are My World was recorded live at the Sydney Entertainment Centre by Darlene Zschech and the Hillsong team, with over 300 singers and musicians. This was the first live praise and worship album Hillsong Church recorded in the Sydney Entertainment Centre. Over 9,000 people from the newly merged Hillsong Church congregation in both the Hills and City came together to record the album.

== Track listing (CD) ==
1. "Your Love Is Beautiful" (Reuben Morgan, Raymond Badham, Steve McPherson, Nigel Hendroff) - worship leader: Darlene Zschech - 4:38
2. "God Is Great" (Marty Sampson) - worship leader: Marty Sampson, b. Darlene Zschech - 4:56
3. "All of My Days" (Mark Stevens) - worship leader: Mark Stevens - 5:02
4. "Emmanuel" (Badham) - worship leader: Darlene Zschech - 6:48
5. "You Stand Alone" (Stevens, McPherson) - worship leaders: Steve McPherson, Mark Stevens - 4:48
6. "Irresistible" (Darlene Zschech) - worship leader: Darlene Zschech - 6:05
7. "You Are My World" (Sampson) - worship leader: Marty Sampson, b. Darlene Zschech - 6:31
8. "Everything That Has Breath" (Morgan) - worship leader: Darlene Zschech - 4:22
9. "God So Loved" (Morgan) - worship leader: Darlene Zschech - 5:54
10. "To You" (Zschech) - worship leader: Darlene Zschech - 7:00
11. "Worthy Is the Lamb" (Zschech) - worship leader: Miriam Webster - 7:16
12. "Forever" (Sampson) - worship leader: Mark Stevens - 4:45
13. "My Best Friend" (Joel Houston, Sampson) - worship leader: Marty Sampson, b. Darlene Zschech - 5:19

== Track listing (DVD) ==
The DVD has a slightly different track order and also contains three bonus songs, "Glorious" (found on the CD compilation album Extravagant Worship: The Songs of Darlene Zschech), and reprises of "You Are My World" and "God Is Great". The outro consists of a piano accompaniment version of "God Is Great".

1. "Everything That Has Breath"
2. "God Is Great"
3. "All of My Days"
4. "Emmanuel"
5. "You Stand Alone"
6. "Irresistible"
7. "You Are My World"
8. "Your Love Is Beautiful"
9. "Glorious" (Darlene Zschech)
10. "God So Loved"
11. "To You"
12. "Worthy Is the Lamb"
13. "Forever"
14. "My Best Friend"
15. "You Are My World" (reprise)
16. "God Is Great" (reprise)

== Credits ==
- Darlene Zschech – worship pastor, producer, senior worship leader, senior lead vocal, vocal producer
- Reuben Morgan – acoustic guitar, vocals, producer, worship leader, vocal producer
- Steve McPherson – vocals, vocal producer
- Marty Sampson – acoustic guitar, vocals
- Miriam Webster – vocals
- Paul Andrew – vocals
- Tulele Faletolu – vocals
- Donia Makedonez – vocals
- Julie Bassett – vocals
- Erica Crocker – vocals
- Holly Dawson – vocals
- Lucy Fisher – vocals
- Michelle Fragar – vocals
- Peter Hart – vocals
- Mark Stevens – vocals
- Scott Haslem – vocals
- Ned Davies – vocals
- Woody Pierson – vocals
- Karen Horn – vocals
- Tanya Riches – vocals
- Ruth Athanasio – choir conductor
- Russell Fragar – piano, music director, producer
- Peter King – piano, keyboards, Hammond organ, programming, post
- Craig Gower – keyboard
- Kevin Lee – keyboard
- David Moyse – electric guitar, post production engineer
- Paul Peipman - electric guitar
- Nigel Hendroff – acoustic guitar
- Raymond Badham – electric guitar
- Marcüs Beaumont – electric guitar, guitar technician,
- Luke Munns – drums, percussion, cover art concept
- Ross Peacock – drums
- Rick Petereit – drums
- Peter Wallis – bass
- Ian Fisher – bass
- Adam Simek – percussion ensemble
- Matthew Hope – trumpet
- Gary Honor – saxophone
- Igor Fedotov - saxophone
- Steve Bullivant – saxophone
- Jonno Louwrens – saxophone
- Elisha Vella – percussion ensemble
- Peter Kelly – percussion, tympani, percussion ensemble
- Bobbie Houston – executive producer
- Chris Perry – artwork, design
- George Gorga – house sound engineer
- Tim Tickner – assistant
- Mark Hopkins – coordination
- Matthew Barnes – assistant engineer
- Don Bartley – mastering
- Jeff Todd – post production engineer
- David Watson – production coordination
- Paul Pilsneniks – mixing assistant, assistant
- Matt Barnes – assistant engineer
- Tania Paurini – assistant production engineer
- Femia Shirtliff – photography
- Brett Randall – engineer
- Martin Philbey – photography
- Simone Ridley – project coordinator
- Trevor Beck – engineer, production coordination, post production
- Nick Asha – assistant
- Iwan Sujono – artwork
- Kevin Watts – assistant
- Cassandra Langton – coordination
- James Rudder – saxophone, engineer, post production engineer
- Marty Beaton – technician
- Brent Clark – mixing
- Donna Crouch – coordination
