= Amazing Love (Hillsong album) =

Studio album by Hillsong Church
- Released: 19 April 2002
- Recorded: 2001–2002
- Studio: AMC Studios, In House Music, Moyst Music
- Genre: Praise & worship
- Length: 60:06
- Label: Hillsong Music Australia
- Producer: Darlene Zschech

Hillsong Music Australia Worship Series chronology
Overwhelmed (2000)	Amazing Love (2002)	Faithful (2003)

Amazing Love is the fifth album in the Worship series of praise & worship albums by Hillsong Church, which was released in April 2002. The album reached No. 25 on the Billboard Top Contemporary Christian Albums Chart.

== Track listing ==
No.	Title	Writer(s)	Length
1.	"Father"	Ned Davies	5:10
2.	"Every Time"	Tanya Riches	4:41
3.	"My Heart Will Trust"	Reuben Morgan	4:32
4.	"Great Is the Lord"	Nigel Hendroff	5:07
5.	"Faithful"	Raymond Badham	4:33
6.	"Trust in You"	Joanna Piessens	4:00
7.	"Do What You Say"	Miriam Webster	4:46
8.	"Thirst for You"	Badham	5:52
9.	"Reason I Live"	Donia Makedonez	4:56
10.	"Refuge"	Morgan	4:28
11.	"Jesus Won It All"	Webster	5:52
12.	"Amazing Love"	Michelle Kim	6:03

== Personnel ==
- Raymond Badham – arrangement
- Damian Bassett – backing vocals
- Julie Bassett – backing vocals
- Erica Crocker – backing vocals
- Mark Cullen – arrangement
- Tulele Faletolu – lead vocals
- Mitch Farmer – drums
- Michelle Fragar – lead vocals
- Giovanni Galanti – programming
- Craig Gower – piano and keyboards, programming
- Scott Haslem – backing vocals
- Nigel Hendroff – guitars, arrangement
- David Holmes – guitars
- Gary Honor – saxophone
- Bobbie Houston – executive producer
- Brian Houston – executive producer
- Peter King – piano and keyboards, programming
- Steve McPherson – lead vocals, backing vocals, arrangement, choral and vocal arrangement, co-producer
- Reuben Morgan – lead vocals, co-producer
- David Moyse – guitars, arrangement, programming
- Marty Sampson – lead vocals
- Peter Wallis – bass guitar
- Holly Watson – lead vocals
- Miriam Webster – lead vocals
- Darlene Zschech – lead vocals, backing vocals, arrangement, choral and vocal arrangement, producer "Amazing Love", Hillsong CD, Album cover slip
