= Shout to the Lord 2000 =

Live album by Hillsong
- Released: 5 January 1999
- Recorded: 6–10 July 1998
- Venue: Hillsong '98 The Conference at the State Sports Centre
- Genre: Praise & worship
- Length: 74:10
- Label: Integrity/Hosanna! Music/Word
- Producers: Russell Fragar, Darlene Zschech, Chris Thomason (Executive), Don Moen (Executive)

Hillsong Music Australia Hosanna! Music chronology
Shout to the Lord (1996)	Shout to the Lord 2000 (1999)

Shout to the Lord 2000 is a live praise and worship album of contemporary worship music by Hillsong. The album appeared on the Billboard 200 and reached No. 8 on the Top Contemporary Christian Albums Chart.

== Making of the album ==
Shout to the Lord 2000 was recorded live at the 1998 Hillsong Conference by Darlene Zschech and the Hillsong team in Sydney, Australia. Two American Christian musicians, Ron Kenoly and Alvin Slaughter, also appear on this album. It was recorded at the State Sports Centre as well.

== Track listing ==
1. "Can't Stop Talking" (Russell Fragar) lead vocalist: Darlene Zschech
2. "Friends in High Places" (Fragar) lead vocalist: Darlene Zschech
3. "God Is in the House" (Fragar & Darlene Zschech) lead vocalist: Darlene Zschech
4. "All Things Are Possible" (Zschech) lead vocalist: Darlene Zschech
5. "Jesus Is Alive" (Ron Kenoly) lead vocalist: Ron Kenoly
6. "Breathe on Me" (Lucy Fisher) lead vocalist: Darlene Zschech
7. "My Heart Will Trust" (Reuben Morgan) lead vocalist: Mark Stevens & Darlene Zschech
8. "The Potter's Hand" (Zschech) lead vocalist: Darlene Zschech
9. "Love You So Much" (Fragar) lead vocalist: Darlene Zschech
10. "That's What We Came Here For" (Fragar & Zschech) lead vocalist: Darlene Zschech
11. "My Redeemer Lives" (Morgan) lead vocalist: Darlene Zschech
12. "God Is Good" (Alvin Slaughter) lead vocalist: Alvin Slaughter
13. "Shout to the Lord" (Zschech) lead vocalist: Ron Kenoly, Darlene Zschech & Alvin Slaughter
14. "Glory to the King" (Zschech) lead vocalist: Darlene Zschech
15. "Eagle's Wings" (Morgan) lead vocalists: Darlene Zschech & Steve McPherson
16. "Hear Our Praises" (Morgan) lead vocalists: Darlene Zschech & Reuben Morgan

== Credits ==
- David Moyse – guitar, engineer
- Jeff Todd – engineer, post production engineer
- Darlene Zschech – arranger, producer, worship leader, vocal director
- Chris Springer – A&R
- Mark Stevens – vocals
- David Riley – design
- Reuben Morgan – acoustic guitar, vocals
- Megan Parker – saxophone
- Russell Fragar – piano, engineer, post production engineer, producer, arranger
- Cameron Wade – director, technical director
- Matt Damico – mixing assistant
- Ross Peacock –drums
- Chris Miline – percussion
- Peter King – timpani
- Rick Peteriet – drums
- Bart Elsmore – engineer, post production engineer
- Greg Hughes – trombone
- Mark Gregory – trumpet
- Lisa Young- vocals
- Donia Gandjou – vocals
- Nick Asha – engineer
- Trevor Beck – engineer, post production engineer, assistant engineer
- Erica Crocker – vocals
- Lucy Fisher – vocals
- Craig Gower – keyboards, vocals
- Scott Haslem – vocals, vocal director
- Michael Cuthbertson – director, technical director
- Ruth Grant – choir director
- Hills Christian Life centre choir – choir, chorus
- Karen Parker -saxophone
- Chris Thomason – executive producer
- Don Moen – executive producer
- Ron Davis – engineer, mixing
- Alvin Slaughter – vocals, performer
- Matt Barnes – engineer
- Ron Kenoly – leader, performer
