= I Give You My Heart (Hillsong song) =

1995 song by Hillsong Music Australia

Song by Hillsong Music Australia

from the album God Is in the House
- Language: English
- Published: 1995
- Released: 30 June 1996
- Genre: Contemporary worship music
- Songwriter(s): Reuben Morgan
- Producer(s): Darlene Zschech

"I Give You My Heart" (sometimes called "Lord, I Give You My Heart" or "This is My Desire") is a 1995 song by Reuben Morgan, who wrote both the music and the lyrics. The lyrics are about giving God the entirety of oneself. The song is widely used in congregational singing, particularly within evangelicalism. "I Give You My Heart" is a devotional song, part of the contemporary worship music genre, and also a slow ballad.

In the liner notes of God is in the House, Morgan said of this song: "The heart of GOD is for us to be completely sold out to HIM. Our thoughts, passions and dreams (everything that makes us who we are) only have true life as they become HIS to shape and to mould. As we give our heart and our soul to GOD we then walk in the endless riches that are found in intimacy with HIM."

Among Christian songs, "I Give You My Heart" is one of the most frequently recorded. The song appeared on Hillsong Music Australia's compilation album Ultimate Worship. Briana Scott released a cover version of the song on her debut album While I'm Here in 2005. Morgan also recorded his own interpretation of I Give You My Heart on his first solo album, World Through Your Eyes.
