= God Is in the House (Hillsong Church album) =

Live album by Hillsong Church
- Released: 30 June 1996
- Recorded: 24 March 1996
- Venue: The Hills Entertainment Centre, Sydney, Australia
- Genre: Contemporary worship music
- Length: 68:07
- Label: Hillsong
- Producer: Russell Fragar and Darlene Zschech

Hillsong Music Australia Live praise & worship chronology
Friends in High Places (1995)	God Is in the House (1996)	All Things Are Possible (1997)

God Is in the House is the fifth album in the live praise and worship series of contemporary worship music by Hillsong Church. It is also the first Hillsong album where Darlene Zschech was Worship Pastor. The album was recorded live at the Hills Entertainment Centre. The album reached No. 40 on the Billboard Top Contemporary Christian Albums Chart.

== Track listing ==
1. "God Is in the House" (Russell Fragar & Darlene Zschech) lead vocalist: Darlene Zschech
2. "Joy in the Holy Ghost" (Fragar) lead vocalist: Lucy Fisher
3. "Steppin' Out" (Steve McPherson) lead vocalist: Steve McPherson
4. "My Heart Sings Praises" (Fragar) lead vocalist: Darlene Zschech
5. "And That My Soul Knows Very Well" (Zschech & Fragar) lead vocalist: Darlene Zschech
6. "Jesus, What a Beautiful Name" (Tanya Riches) lead vocalist: Lisa Young
7. "Let the Peace of God Reign" (Zschech) lead vocalists: Rob Eastwood & Darlene Zschech
8. "I Give You My Heart" (Reuben Morgan) lead vocalist: Steve McPherson
9. "Walking in the Light" (Zschech) lead vocalist: Darlene Zschech
10. "Your People Sing Praises" (Fragar) lead vocalist: Darlene Zschech
11. "I Believe the Promise" (Fragar) lead vocalists: Erica Crocker & Darlene Zschech
12. "Thank You, Lord" (Dennis Jernigan) lead vocalists: Darlene Zschech & Donia Gandjou
13. "Lord of the Heavens" (Lucy Fisher) lead vocalist: Darlene Zschech
14. "I Will Run to You" (Zschech) lead vocalist: Darlene Zschech
15. "God Is in the House" (reprise) lead vocalist: Darlene Zschech

== Band ==
- Darlene Zschech - worship leader
- Erica Crocker - vocals
- Rob Eastwood - vocals
- Lucy Fisher - vocals
- Donia Gandjou - vocals
- Craig Gower - keyboards, vocals
- Scott Haslem - vocals
- Steve McPherson - vocals, electric guitar
- Lisa Young - vocals
- Russell Fragar - music director, piano
- David Moyse - electric guitar
- Ian Fisher - bass guitar
- Rick Peteriet - drums
- Chris Milne - percussion
- David Schenk - additional percussion
- Paul Thompson - additional percussion
- Raymond Floro - additional percussion
- Karen Packer - tenor saxophone
- Cathy Coluccio - alto saxophone
- Megan Howard - alto saxophone
- Renee Boland - alto saxophone
- Cathy Coluccio - soprano saxophone
- Mark Gregory - trumpet
- Peter King - trumpet
- Ruth Grant - Hillsong choir conductor
- Julia Beaumont - Hillsong Kidz choir conductor
- Amour Mah - Hillsong Kidz choir conductor
