= List of Official Christian & Gospel Albums Chart number ones from the 2010s =

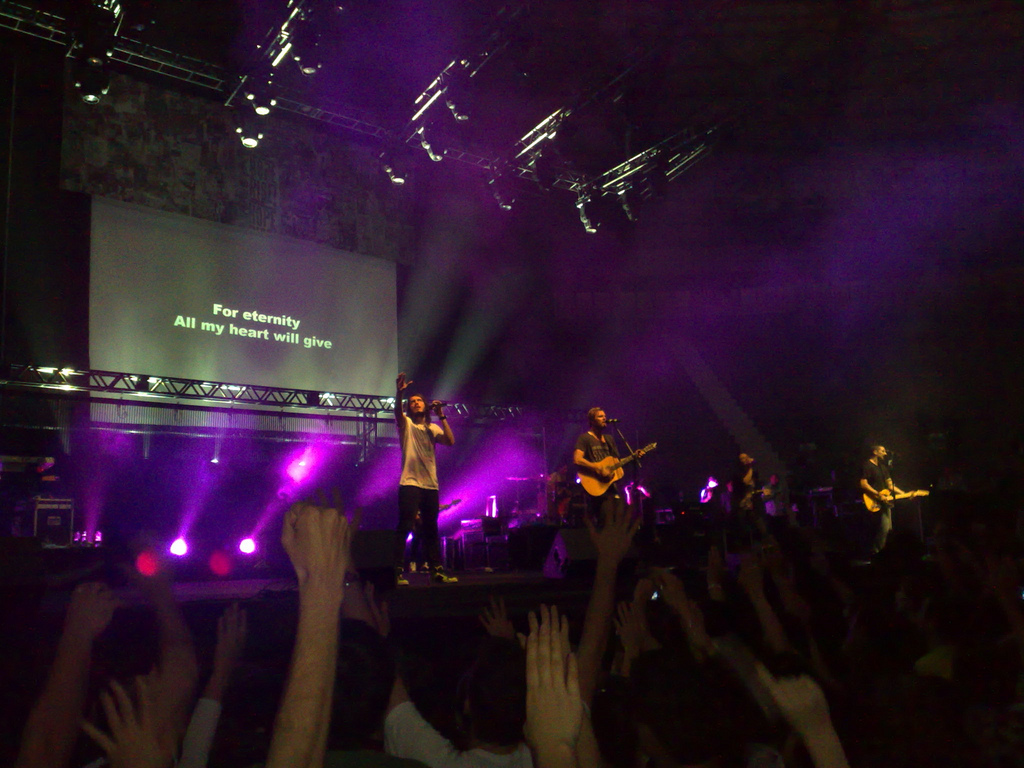
Hillsong United achieved the first number one on the Official Christian & Gospel Albums Chart with Zion.

The Official Christian & Gospel Albums Chart is a music chart based on sales of albums of Contemporary Christian and gospel music in the UK. It is compiled weekly by the Official Charts Company (OCC), with each week's number one being announced on Mondays on their official website. The chart was launched on 11 March 2013 in partnership with Christian child development charity Compassion UK – the album at number one on the first chart was Zion by Hillsong United. The band's record label, Hillsong Music UK, remarked that they were "thrilled to be part of the launch of the first Official Christian & Gospel Albums Chart in the UK". The event launching the chart was hosted by David Grant, and featured Martin Smith of Delirious? and the London Community Gospel Choir. The previous year, 600 new Christian music albums had been released in the UK.

== Number ones ==
Key
No.	nth album to top the Official Christian & Gospel Albums Chart
re	Return of an album to number one

No.	Artist (Note: The artist, song, date of reaching number one and number of weeks at number one are those given by the OCC.)	Album	Record label (Note: The record labels are those given by the OCC.)	Reached number one (for the week ending)	Weeks at number one (Total weeks at number one)
2013
1	Hillsong United	Zion	Hillsong	16 March 2013	1
2	Worship Central	Let It Be Known	Integrity	23 March 2013	4
re	Hillsong United	Zion	Hillsong	20 April 2013	2 (3)
3	Martin Smith	God's Great Dance Floor Step 01	Integrity	4 May 2013	1
re	Hillsong United	Zion	Hillsong	11 May 2013	1 (4)
4	Rend Collective	Campfire	Integrity	18 May 2013	1
re	Worship Central	Let It Be Known	Integrity	25 May 2013	1 (5)
5	Amy Grant	How Mercy Looks from Here	Decca	1 June 2013	1
6	Guvna B	Odd 1 Out	Guvna	8 June 2013	1
re	Worship Central	Let It Be Known	Integrity	15 June 2013	1 (6)
re	Amy Grant	How Mercy Looks from Here	Decca	22 June 2013	1 (2)
re	Hillsong United	Zion	Hillsong	29 June 2013	1 (5)
7	Mavis Staples	One True Vine	ANTI-	6 July 2013	1
8	Hillsong Live	Glorious Ruins	Hillsong	13 July 2013	9
9	Bethel Music	Tides	Integrity	14 September 2013	3
10	Matt Redman	Your Grace Finds Me	sixstepsrecords	5 October 2013	1
11	Hillsong Young & Free	We Are Young & Free	Hillsong	12 October 2013	1
re	Matt Redman	Your Grace Finds Me	sixstepsrecords	19 October 2013	3 (4)
12	Friar Alessandro	Voice of Joy	Decca	9 November 2013	1
re	Matt Redman	Your Grace Finds Me	sixstepsrecords	16 November 2013	2 (6)
13	Soul Survivor & Momentum	The Flood	Integrity	30 November 2013	1
14	Skillet	Rise	Warner Bros.	7 December 2013	1
15	King's College Choir & David Willcocks	Essential Carols	Decca	14 December 2013	4
2014
re	Matt Redman	Your Grace Finds Me	sixstepsrecords	11 January 2014	2 (8)
16	Elevation Worship	Only King Forever	Essential Worship	25 January 2014	1
re	Matt Redman	Your Grace Finds Me	sixstepsrecords	1 February 2014	1 (9)
17	Casting Crowns	Thrive	Reunion	8 February 2014	4
18	Bethel Music	Tides Live	Bethel Music	8 March 2014	1
19	Patrick Hawes	Angel	Decca	15 March 2014	1
re	Bethel Music	Tides Live	Bethel Music	22 March 2014	1 (2)
20	Rend Collective	The Art of Celebration	Integrity	29 March 2014	5
21	Bethel Music	You Make Me Brave (Live)	Bethel Music	3 May 2014	2
re	Rend Collective	The Art of Celebration	Integrity Music	17 May 2014	3 (8)
22	LIFE Worship	Dance Again	Integrity	7 June 2014	1
23	Jesus Culture	Unstoppable Love	Jesus Culture	14 June 2014	1
re	Rend Collective	The Art of Celebration	Integrity	21 June 2014	3 (11)
24	Hillsong Worship	No Other Name	Hillsong	12 July 2014	7
re	Rend Collective	The Art of Celebration	Integrity	30 August 2014	1 (12)
25	Steffany Gretzinger	The Undoing	Bethel Music	6 September 2014	1
re	Rend Collective	The Art of Celebration	Integrity	13 September 2014	1 (13)
26	Lecrae	Anomaly	Reach	20 September 2014	1
re	Rend Collective	The Art of Celebration	Integrity	27 September 2014	1 (14)
re	Hillsong Worship	No Other Name	Hillsong	4 October 2014	1 (8)
re	Rend Collective	The Art of Celebration	Integrity	11 October 2014	4 (18)
27	Worship Central	Set Apart	Integrity	8 November 2014	2
re	Rend Collective	The Art of Celebration	Integrity	22 November 2014	1 (19)
28	Rend Collective	Campfire Christmas (Vol. 1)	UMC	29 November 2014	3
re	Rend Collective	The Art of Celebration	Integrity	20 December 2014	2 (21)
2015
re	Rend Collective	Campfire Christmas (Vol. 1)	UMC	3 January 2015	1 (4)
re	Rend Collective	The Art of Celebration	Integrity	10 January 2015	4 (25)
29	Bethel Music	We Will Not Be Shaken (Live)	Bethel Music	7 February 2015	9
30	Various artists	The World's Favorite Worship Songs	UMTV	11 April 2015	8
31	Hillsong United	Empires	Hillsong	6 June 2015	3
32	Matt Redman	Unbroken Praise (Live at Abbey Road Studios)	Integrity	27 June 2015	5
33	Tim Hughes	Pocketful of Faith	Integrity	30 July 2015	1
34	New Wine Worship	Wildfire Live Worship From New Wine	Integrity	6 August 2015	3
35	United Pursuit	Simple Gospel (Live)	United Pursuit	27 August 2015	1
36	Rend Collective	As Family We Go	CCMG	3 September 2015	5
37	Amanda Cook	Brave New World	Bethel Music	8 October 2015	1
38	Hillsong Worship	The Peace Project	Hillsong	15 October 2015	1
re	Rend Collective	As Family We Go	CCMG	22 October 2015	1 (6)
39	Hillsong Worship	Open Heaven / River Wild	Hillsong Music	29 October 2015	4
40	Soul Survivor	Love Takes Over	Integrity	26 November 2015	1
41	Guvna B	Secret World	Guvna	3 December 2015	1
re	Hillsong Worship	Open Heaven / River Wild	Hillsong Music	10 December 2015	1
re	Rend Collective	Campfire Christmas (Vol. 1)	UMC	17 December 2015	2 (6)
2016
re	Hillsong Worship	Open Heaven / River Wild	Hillsong Music	7 January 2016	3 (7)
42	Jesus Culture	Let It Echo	Jesus Culture	28 January 2016	1
43	William McDowell	Sounds of Revival	Entertainment One	4 February 2016	1
re	Jesus Culture	Let It Echo	Jesus Culture	11 February 2016	1 (2)
44	Elevation Worship	Here as in Heaven	Essential Worship	18 February 2016	2
re	Jesus Culture	Let It Echo	Jesus Culture	3 March 2016	1 (3)
45	Hillsong Young & Free	Youth Revival	Hillsong	10 March 2016	2
46	Bethel Music	Have It All – Live at Bethel Church	Bethel Music	24 March 2016	7
47	Philippa Hanna	Speed of Light	Resound Media	12 May 2016	1
re	Bethel Music	Have It All – Live at Bethel Church	Bethel Music	19 May 2016	1 (8)
re	Rend Collective	As Family We Go	CCMG	26 May 2016	2 (7)
48	LIFE Worship	Wide Open Space (Live)	Integrity	9 June 2016	2
re	Bethel Music	Have It All – Live at Bethel Church	Bethel Music	23 June 2016	1 (9)
49	Keith & Kristyn Getty	Facing a Task Unfinished	Getty Music	30 June 2016	1
re	Bethel Music	Have It All – Live at Bethel Church	Bethel Music	7 July 2016	1 (10)
50	Vineyard UK	Fearless: Live from DTI 2016	Vineyard	14 July 2016	1
re	Bethel Music	Have It All – Live at Bethel Church	Bethel Music	21 July 2016	1 (11)
51	Hillsong United	Of Dirt and Grace: Live from the Land	Hillsong	28 July 2016	3
52	Skillet	Unleashed	Roadrunner	18 August 2016	4
re	Keith & Kristyn Getty	Facing a Task Unfinished	Getty Music	15 September 2016	2 (3)
53	Casting Crowns	The Very Next Thing	Reunion	29 September 2016	1
re	Skillet	Unleashed	Roadrunner	6 October 2016	1 (5)
54	Jonathan David & Melissa Helser	Beautiful Surrender	Bethel Music	13 October 2016	1
55	Rend Collective	Campfire II: Simplicity	CCMG	20 October 2016	1
56	Hillsong Worship	Let There Be Light	Hillsong	27 October 2016	4
57	Soul Survivor	Never Gonna Stop	Integrity	24 November 2016	1
58	Matt Redman	These Christmas Lights	sixsteps	1 December 2016	5
2017
59	King's College Choir & David Willcocks	Favourite Carols from King's	Warner Classics	5 January 2017	1
re	Hillsong Worship	Let There Be Light	Hillsong	12 January 2017	4 (8)
60	Brian & Jenn Johnson	After All These Years	Bethel Music	9 February 2017	1
61	Kari Jobe	The Garden	UMC	16 February 2017	1
re	Bethel Music	Have It All – Live at Bethel Church	Bethel Music	23 February 2017	1 (12)
re	Hillsong Worship	Let There Be Light	Hillsong	2 March 2017	7 (15)
62	Bethel Music	Starlight	Bethel Music	20 April 2017	2
63	Kim Walker-Smith	On My Side	CCMG	3 May 2017	2
re	Hillsong Worship	Let There Be Light	Hillsong	11 May 2017	4 (19)
64	Worship Central	Mercy Road	CCMG	8 June 2017	1
65	Darlene Zschech	Here I Am Send Me	Integrity	15 June 2017	1
66	Hillsong United	Wonder	Hillsong	22 June 2017	9
67	Jesus Culture	Love Has a Name	CCMG	24 August 2017	2
re	Hillsong United	Wonder	Hillsong	7 September 2017	4 (13)
68	Kristene DiMarco	Where His Light Was	Bethel Music	5 October 2017	1
69	Matt Redman	Glory Song	sixsteps	12 October 2017	6
70	Sweet & Lynch	Unified	Frontiers	23 November 2017	1
71	Soul Survivor	The Promise (Live)	Integrity	30 November 2017	1
72	Philippa Hanna	Come Back Fighting	Resound	7 December 2017	1
re	Hillsong Worship	The Peace Project	Hillsong Music	14 December 2017	1
re	Matt Redman	Glory Song	sixsteps	21 December 2017	2 (8)
2018
re	Hillsong Worship	The Peace Project	Hillsong Music	4 January 2018	1 (2)
73	NF	Mansion	CCMG	11 January 2018	3
74	Rend Collective	Good News	CCMG	1 February 2018	1
75	Cory Asbury	Reckless Love	Bethel Music	10 February 2018	1
re	Rend Collective	Good News	CCMG	15 February 2018	8 (9)
76	Steffany Gretzinger	Blackout	Bethel Music	12 April 2018	1
77	Hillsong Worship	There Is More	Hillsong Music	19 April 2018	8
78	LIFE Worship	Speak to the Storm	Integrity Music	14 June 2018	1
re	Hillsong Worship	There Is More	Hillsong Music	21 June 2018	3 (11)
79	Hillsong Young & Free	III	Hillsong Music	12 July 2018	1
re	Hillsong Worship	There Is More	Hillsong Music	19 July 2018	3 (14)
80	New Wine Worship	You Restore My Soul	Integrity Music	9 August 2018	1
re	Hillsong Worship	There Is More	Hillsong Music	16 August 2018	1 (15)
81	Elvis Presley	Where No One Stands Alone	Sony	23 August 2018	5
82	Tori Kelly	Hiding Place	Virgin	27 September 2018	1
re	Elvis Presley	Where No One Stands Alone	Sony	4 October 2018	1 (6)
83	Elevation Worship	Hallelujah Here Below	Elevation Worship	11 October 2018	1
84	Lauren Daigle	Look Up Child	Centricity Music	18 October 2018	8
re	Elvis Presley	Where No One Stands Alone	Sony	20 December 2018	1 (7)
re	Lauren Daigle	Look Up Child	Centricity Music	27 December 2018	5 (13)
2019
85	Switchfoot	Native Tongue	Fantasy Records	31 January 2019	1
86	Bethel Music	Victory	Bethel Music	7 February 2019	9
re	Lauren Daigle	Look Up Child	Centricity Music	11 April 2019	4 (17)
87	Hillsong United	People	Hillsong Music	9 May 2019	1
re	Lauren Daigle	Look Up Child	Centricity Music	16 May 2019	11 (28)
88	Scott Stapp	The Space Between the Shadows	Napalm	1 August 2019	1
89	NF	The Search	NF Real Music	8 August 2019	13
90	Kanye West	Jesus Is King	Def Jam	7 November 2019	6
re	NF	The Search	NF Real Music	19 December 2019	15

== Broadcast ==
The chart is aired on Christian radio stations Premier Christian Radio on Tuesday afternoons at 5pm, and on UCB UK on Thursday evenings at 10pm and Sunday evenings at 6pm.

== See also ==
- List of Billboard Top Christian Albums number ones of the 2010s
