= Aodhán King =

American musician (born 1992)

- Born: December 25, 1992 (age 33); Sydney, Australia
- Occupations: Singer; songwriter
- Years active: 2012–present
- Musical career
- Genre: Worship
- Label: Anotherland
- Formerly of: Hillsong Young & Free
- Website: aodhanking.co

Aodhán King (born 25 December 1992) is an Australian Christian musician. He was a founding member of the Christian music collective Hillsong Young & Free from its formation in 2012 until 2025, when King announced he was no longer part of the band. Following a signing with Anotherland Records and Capitol Christian Music Group in 2024, and has since released one album as a solo performer, Beyond Us (2024), and two collobaritve albums, Throwing Paint (2025) with Abbie Gamboa and Happy to Be Here (2026) with Benjamin William Hastings.

== Career ==
=== Work with Hillsong Church (2004–2024) ===
King attended Hillsong Church with his family while growing up, and in 2004, he became involved himself in their ministry himself. In 2012, after several involvement with the association's ministry, King became one of the founding members of Hillsong Young & Free – a spinoff of Hillsong United targeted towards younger audiences. King experienced notable success with the collective; their debut album, We Are Young & Free (2013) topped the Billboard Top Christian Albums chart and peaked at number 22 on the Billboard 200. Following Hillsong Church's COVID-19 rule breaches and public scandals in 2021, King became less active with the collective because he believed it "started to look different", and in 2025 announced that he had officially left.

=== Beyond Us and Throwing Paint (2024–2026) ===
In August 2024, it was announced that King had signed with Anotherland Records and Capitol CMG. His first release to the label, "Thank You So Much Jesus", was released on 9 August 2024. Subsequently, he released "Without You" and "Pray You Never Leave" on 6 September 2024, and on 27 September 2024, he released "Yesterday, Today and Tomorrow". The four releases preceded King's debut solo attempt, Beyond Us, which was first announced in October 2024 and released later that month.

Throwing Paint, a collaborative album with Abby Gamboa, was surprise released on 19 August 2025. In November 2025, the album track "Deep" was released to Christian radio in the United States as the album's first and only single. On 17 March 2026, King released a collaboration with Hastings, titled "Hollow Grave". The following month, it was announced the King and Hastings were in the process of recording a forthcoming collaborative album together. The album, Happy to Be Here, was released on 29 May 2026.

== Early life ==
King was born in Sydney on Christmas Day, 1992 to Indian and Irish parents. In 2004, King joined Hillsong's youth ministry. In the preceding years, he taught himself guitar and become a member of Hillsong's staff.

== Discography ==
=== Studio albums ===
==== As lead artist ====
Title	Details
Beyond Us	Released: 18 October 2024; Label: Anotherland Records; Formats: CD, digital download, streaming
Throwing Paint (with Abbie Gamboa)	Released: 29 August 2025; Label: Anotherland; Formats: Digital download, streaming
Happy to Be Here (with Benjamin William Hastings)	Release: 29 May 2026; Label: Independent; Formats: Digital download, streaming

==== With Hillsong ====
- We Are Young & Free (2013)
- Youth Revival (2016)
- III (2018)
- All of My Best Friends (2020)

=== Live albums ===
Title	Details
Just Waiting to See What God Does (with Benjamin William Hastings)	Release: 28 August 2026; Label: Independent; Formats: Digital download, streaming

=== Extended plays ===
Title	Details
Hallelujah (If Not for You)	Released: 31 January 2025; Label: Anotherland Records; Formats: Digital download, streaming

=== Singles ===
==== As lead artist ====
Title	Year	Peak chart positions	Album
Title	Year	AUS Christ.	Album
"Thank You So Much Jesus" (featuring Paul Klein)	2024	—	Beyond Us
"Without You"	2024	2	Beyond Us
"Pray You Never Leave"	2024	—	Beyond Us
"Yesterday, Today & Tomorrow" (featuring Griff)	2024	—	Beyond Us
"King of the World" (with Anna Golden)	2026	—	Non-album single
"Deep" (with Abby Gamboa)	2026	—	Throwing Paint
"Hallelujah (If Not for You)"	2026	9	Beyond Us (Deluxe)
"Hollow Grave" (with Benjamin William Hastings)	2026	—	Happy to Be Here
"Saturday" (with Benjamin William Hastings)	2026	—	Happy to Be Here
"Wondrous Cross (When I Survey)" (with Benjamin William Hastings featuring Cody Carnes)	2026	—	Happy to Be Here
"—" denotes a recording that did not chart or was not released in that territory.

==== With Hillsong ====
Title	Year	Peak chart positions					Album
Title	Year	AUS Christ.	NZ Hot	US Christ.	US Christ. Air.	US Christ. Digital	Album
"One Thing" (Hillsong Worship featuring Aodhán King)	2015	19	—	—	—	34	Open Heaven / River Wild
"This Is Living" (Hillsong Young & Free featuring Aodhán King and Lecrae)	2015	1	—	16	29	9	This Is Living (EP)
"Where You Are" (Hillsong Young & Free featuring Aodhán King)	2015	1	—	16	25	17	Youth Revival
"Let Go" (Hillsong Young & Free featuring Aodhán King)	2018	1	—	23	31	23	III
"Heart of God" (Hillsong Young & Free featuring Aodhán King)	2019	—	—	46	39	—	III
"Whole Heart (Hold Me Now)" (Hillsong UNITED featuring Aodhán King and Taya)	2019	—	—	14	—	3	People
"Best Friends" (Hillsong Young & Free featuring Aodhán King)	2020	1	30	26	50	20	All of My Best Friends
"Uncomplicated" (Hillsong Young & Free featuring Aodhán King)	2020	—	—	41	—	—	All of My Best Friends
"—" denotes a recording that did not chart or was not released in that territory.

==== As featured artist ====
Title	Year	Peak chart positions	Album
Title	Year	US Christ. Air.	Album
"Take the World" (Woodlands Worship featuring Aodhán King)	2025	—	Non-album single
"The Perfect Love of Jesus" (LO Worship featuring Aodhán King)	2025	39	The Perfect Love of Jesus (EP)
"—" denotes a recording that did not chart or was not released in that territory.

=== Promotional singles ===
==== With Hillsong ====
Title	Year	Peak chart positions	Album
Title	Year	US Christ.	Album
"No One But You" (Hillsong Worship featuring Aodhán King)	2019	23	Awake

=== Other charted songs ===
==== As lead artist ====
Title	Year	Peak chart positions	Album
Title	Year	US Christ.	Album
"Time" (with Lauren Daigle)	2024	27	Beyond Us
"Yahweh" (with Benjamin William Hastings featuring Tiffany Hudson)	2026	45	Happy to Be Here

==== With Hillsong ====
Title	Year	Peak chart positions				Album
Title	Year	AUS Christ.	US Christ.	US Christ. Air.	US Christ. Digital	Album
"Sinking Deep" (Hillsong Young & Free featuring Aodhán King)	2015	—	28	—	44	This Is Living (EP)
"To My Knees" (Hillsong Young & Free featuring Aodhán King)	2016	—	37	—	—	Youth Revival
"Joy to the World" (Hillsong Worship featuring Aodhán King)	2017	1	31	25	—	The Peace Project
"Touch of Heaven" (Hillsong Worship featuring Aodhán King)	2018	—	27	—	—	There Is More
"—" denotes a recording that did not chart or was not released in that territory.

== Awards and nominations ==
Year	Organization	Nominee / work	Category	Result	Ref.
2017	Grammy Awards	Youth Revival (with Hillsong Young & Free)	Best Contemporary Christian Music Album	Nominated	
2025	CMAA	Himself	Artist of the Year	Nominated	
2025	CMAA	"Without You"	Song of the Year	Nominated	
2026	CMAA	Himself	Artist of the Year	Pending	
2026	CMAA	"Hallelujah (If Not For You)"	Song of the Year	Pending	
