= There Is More =

2018 live album by Hillsong Worship

Live album by Hillsong Worship
- Released: 6 April 2018
- Recorded: 15–17 November 2017
- Venues: Hillsong Church, Sydney, Australia
- Genre: Contemporary worship music
- Length: 92:24
- Labels: Hillsong Music, Capitol CMG
- Producers: Brooke Ligertwood, Michael Guy Chislett

Hillsong Worship live album chronology
Let There Be Light (2016)	There Is More (2018)	These Same Skies (2021)

Hillsong Worship chronology
The Peace Project (2017)	There Is More (2018)	Awake (2019)

Singles from There Is More
- 1. "Who You Say I Am" Released: 15 June 2018

There Is More (stylised in capital letters) is the 26th live album by Australian worship group Hillsong Worship. The album was released on 6 April 2018, by Hillsong Music and Capitol Christian Music Group. Production was handled by Brooke Ligertwood and Michael Guy Chislett.

Recorded during the 2017 Hillsong Worship & Creative Conference at Hillsong Church in Sydney, Australia, the album has seventeen songs (four of them being acoustic covers) including "Who You Say I Am", "Remembrance", "New Wine", "Touch of Heaven" and two live renditions of previously released songs: Hillsong United's hit single "So Will I (100 Billion X)" from Wonder and "Seasons" from Hillsong Worship's The Peace Project (2017).

It was nominated for Top Christian Album at the 2019 Billboard Music Awards.

== Background ==
In early January 2018, Hillsong Worship announced that they would be joining Hillsong Church senior pastor Brian Houston on a tour in the United States dubbed There Is More starting on 5 April, stopping in thirteen cities whilst promoting Houston's book titled There Is More which was slated for a 20 March release. On 3 February 2018, Hillsong Worship announced that they would release a live worship album, also carrying the same name, on 6 April, commencing the digital pre-order period. On 2 March 2018, "Who You Say I Am" and a live rendition of Hillsong United's "So Will I (100 Billion X)" availed as promotional singles during the digital pre-order. The album was released on 6 April, wherein the pre-order period ended.

The premise of There Is More is in the story of Jacob wrestling with God through the night, found in Genesis 32, producer and featured worship leader Brooke Ligertwood explains:

"On the other side of Jacob's divine encounter was a new name, a new blessing, a new identity and a new way of walking (literally). Will we be a worshipping people who are not content to sleep through the night (spiritually speaking) and wake in the morning unchanged? Like Jacob, will we enter into the wrestle with God, dare to know Him more intimately and be changed in the process? This is the premise for Hillsong Worship's 26th live praise and worship album. The title, "THERE IS MORE", truly is a statement-of-belief more than a record title."

— Brooke Ligertwood

Ligertwood went on to say that "There is more at stake than we dare realize – souls, communities, families, nations on the other side of our wrestle through the night seasons. Our personal freedom is for corporate revival. There is more of God, and more to God and His love than we can possible conceive of."

== Artwork ==
The album cover of There Is More has artwork that with designs akin to those found in heraldry. There are thirteen symbols on the album cover, according to the Hillsong Worship Zendesk page, and their meanings are as follows:

- The lion and the man: This denotes Jacob wrestling with God. In Genesis 32, Jacob wrestles with God through the night, and at dawn, his hip is wrenched from its socket and he is given a new name - Israel. The takeaway message is that encountering the Lord will lead to change. In worship, "if we are willing and determined to "not let Him go" as Jacob was, we too will encounter the Holy One and discover our true and place in the plan of God."
- The scroll: This is symbolic of prophecies. The birth, life, death and resurrection of Jesus is the fulfilment of over 350 prophecies documented in the Old Testament, written centuries prior to his birth. "He is the Christ, the Messiah, the Saviour of the world." Scriptural basis - Luke 4:17-21 (NIV).
- The bible: The bible is "God's love letter to humanity. His lamp to our feet and light to our path, His surgeon's scalpel and His equipping grace." Scriptural basis - Hebrews 4:12-13 (MSG), 2 Timothy 3:16-17 (NIV).
- The sunflowers: The plant follows the sun in the sky, with its face towards the light. In like manner, the concept in a spiritual context is that of one being "ever turned towards God, facing Him and following to receive and reflect His light." Scriptural basis - Psalm 34:5 (NIV).
- The heart, the crown of thorns and the cross: God's love (denoted by the heart) for humanity and his commitment to its redemption is evidenced by the obedient suffering of Christ (the crown of thorns), and death (on the cross). The cross made a way for "all to be reconciled to God and to one day enter Zion, the Heavenly city." Scriptural basis - Hebrews 12:2, Revelation 14:1.
- The stairway: It is recorded in Genesis 28:12 that Jacob, in a dream, saw a stairway which was resting on the earth and going up to heaven, where the Lord stands and speaks a promise to him. Four chapters later, Jacob wrestled with God. "What a gracious God that speaks from His throne and chooses to "come down" to Jacob in Genesis 32."
- Mustard seeds: Mustard seeds were used as descriptor of one's size of faith by Jesus in response to his disciples, who were unsuccessful at exorcising a boy possessed by a demon in Matthew 17. Matthew 17:20 (NIV) says "He replied, “Because you have so little faith. Truly I tell you, if you have faith as small as a mustard seed, you can say to this mountain, ‘Move from here to there,’ and it will move. Nothing will be impossible for you.”
- Water: It is symbolising baptism. In the Great Commission, Jesus commanded that the disciples be baptised. Scriptural basis - Matthew 28:18-19.
- The peacock: This was a symbol of immortality to ancient Greeks as it was believed that its flesh did not decay after death. The early church used this belief in that culture to communicating the redemptive, resurrecting power of Christ. The idea is that present-day, cultural imagery can be used to assist people in understand the Gospel story. Scriptural basis - 1 Timothy 1:17.
- Cup of wine: Wine symbolises the blood of Jesus when partaking Holy Communion in remembrance of the Lord. Scriptural basis - 1 Corinthians 11:26.
- The dove: Symbolic for the Holy Spirit, who descended and settled on Jesus as a dove after Jesus was baptised. Scriptural basis - Matthew 3:16 (NLT).
- Olive tree: Psalm 52:8 (NIV) says "But I am like an olive tree flourishing in the house of God; I trust in God’s unfailing love for ever and ever."
- The rose: This alludes to the "rose of Sharon," a phrase that first appeared in 1611 in the King James translation of the bible. The phrase has been used to describe Jesus in church culture for centuries. "It's a fitting depiction of our glorious Saviour - beautiful in every way, whilst taking the stain of sin and sting of death away."

== Critical reception ==
Professional ratings
Review scores
Source	Rating
CCM Magazine	4.5/5 stars
Cross Rhythms	9/10 squares
Hallels	4.5/5 stars

In a CCM Magazine review, Matt Conner rated the album four-and-a-half stars, saying that "There Is More is an apt title for Hillsong Worship’s latest, a nod to their ever-churning mill of inspirational new songs as well as the album’s prevailing theme of abundant life. Tony Cummings of Cross Rhythms bestowed the album a nine-out-of-ten square rating, declaring that "This is, I understand, Hillsong Worship's 26th non-seasonal live album. It is also one of their very best." In Aaron Lewendon's review for Eden.co.uk, he asserts: "Filled with powerful songs and moving lyrics, There Is More reinforces Hillsong Worship’s status as providers of worship music that speaks to the Church today." Giving the album a four-and-a-half star rating in a Hallels review, Timothy Yap says "They [Hillsong Worship] manifest theological depth in their lyrics; the songs are well-tested for congregational singing (even for small churches) and most importantly they are memorable." In a favourable review by Kevin Davis of NewReleaseToday, he says that "There Is More is loaded with several stirring new worship songs that set me in the proper mindset to praise God for His love. I really enjoy the exciting musical vibe of this album, loaded with stellar vocals, catchy melodies and solid lyrics reflecting unashamed faith in Jesus." Gerod Bass of Worship Musician Magazine was full of praises for the album, concluding that "Hillsong just keeps doing what they have been doing for 2 decades: bringing singable, rich worship music to connect people with God’s heart in worship. There is nothing ground-breaking or different about the arrangements or instrumentation here, but the writing and melodies are solid throughout. I mean, it’s Hillsong. ‘Nuff said."

=== Accolades ===
Year-end lists
Publication	Accolade	Rank	Ref.
Hallels	Best Worship Albums of 2018	1	
NewReleaseToday	Top 10 Worship Albums of 2018	3	

Awards
Year	Organization	Award	Result	Ref.
2018	GMA Dove Awards	Worship Album of the Year	Nominated	
2018	GMA Dove Awards	Long Form Video of the Year	Won	
2019	We Love Christian Music Awards	The Chorus Award (Church Worship Album of the Year)	Won	
2019	Billboard Music Awards	Top Christian Album	Nominated	

== Commercial performance ==
In Australia, There Is More debuted on the ARIA Albums Chart at No. 2.

In the United States, There Is More sold 17,000 equivalent album units in its opening week, thus debuting at No. 2 on Billboard's Christian Albums chart (dated 21 April). There Is More is Hillsong Worship's twelfth album to appear in the Top 10 sector of the Christian Albums chart. The album was also the eighth best-selling digital album in the same week, whilst appearing on the all-inclusive Billboard 200 chart at No. 26.

== Track listing ==
There Is More — CD track listing
No.	Title	Writer(s)	Worship leader(s)	Length
1.	"Who You Say I Am"	Reuben Morgan; Ben Fielding	Brooke Ligertwood; Reuben Morgan	5:29
2.	"You Are Life"	Scott Ligertwood; Aodhán King; Ben Tan; Michael Guy Chislett	Matt Crocker; Karina Wykes	3:23
3.	"The Passion"	Brooke Ligertwood; S. Ligertwood; Chris Davenport	Brooke Ligertwood; Jad Gillies	4:32
4.	"God So Loved"	Matt Crocker; Marty Sampson	David Ware	4:31
5.	"Be Still"	Morgan; Fielding	Ben Fielding; Taya Smith	8:07
6.	"Remembrance"	Davenport; Benjamin Hastings	Jad Gillies; Michelle Cook	5:35
7.	"Valentine"	B. Ligertwood; S. Ligertwood; Joel Houston	Taya Smith; Jad Gillies	5:19
8.	"Touch of Heaven"	King; Hannah Hobbs; Michael Fatkin	Aodhan King; Brooke Ligertwood	7:07
9.	"Lettered Love"	S. Ligertwood; Nathan Hughes	Laura Toggs; Reuben Morgan	3:42
10.	"The Lord's Prayer"	Morgan; Sampson; Hastings; Fielding	Benjamin Hastings	6:08
11.	"New Wine"	B. Ligertwood	Brooke Ligertwood; Annie Garratt	8:10
12.	"So Will I (100 Billion X)"	Houston; Fatkin; Hastings	Taya Smith	7:04
Total length:				74:07

There Is More — Bonus digital tracks
No.	Title	Writer(s)	Worship leader(s)	Length
13.	"Seasons"	Davenport; Tan; Hastings	Benjamin Hastings	4:39
14.	"Who You Say I Am" (Acoustic)	Morgan; Fielding	Reuben Morgan; Brooke Ligertwood	3:11
15.	"Remembrance" (Acoustic)	Davenport; Hastings	Taya Smith; Brooke Ligertwood	5:10
16.	"Touch of Heaven" (Acoustic)	King; Hobbs; Fatkin	Aodhan King	6:17
17.	"The Passion" (Acoustic)	B. Ligertwood; S. Ligertwood; Davenport	Jad Gillies; Brooke Ligertwood	3:58
Total length:				92:24

== There Is More: Studio Sessions ==
There Is More: Studio Sessions

EP by Hillsong Worship
- Released: 13 July 2018
- Genre: Contemporary worship music
- Length: 28:13
- Labels: Hillsong Music, Capitol CMG

Hillsong Worship EP chronology
What a Beautiful Name EP (2017)	There Is More: Studio Sessions (2018)

On 13 July 2018, Hillsong Worship released an extended play with six studio-recorded renditions of songs from the album, titled There Is More: Studio Sessions, via Hillsong Music Australia and Capitol Christian Music Group in digital format.

There Is More: Studio Sessions
No.	Title	Length
1.	"Who You Say I Am"	3:19
2.	"The Passion"	4:26
3.	"You Are Life"	3:12
4.	"Be Still"	5:21
5.	"New Wine"	4:02
6.	"Touch of Heaven" (Reimagined)	7:51
Total length:		28:13

== There Is More: Instrumental ==
There Is More: Instrumental

Recording by Hillsong Worship
- Released: 19 October 2018
- Genres: Contemporary worship music, Instrumental
- Length: 60:11
- Labels: Hillsong Music, Capitol CMG

Hillsong Worship Instrumental chronology
Forever (2003)	There Is More: Instrumental (2018)

On 19 October 2018, Hillsong Worship released an instrumental album titled There Is More: Instrumental, via Hillsong Music Australia and Capitol Christian Music Group in digital format.

There Is More: Instrumental
No.	Title	Length
1.	"Who You Say I Am"	5:46
2.	"You Are Life"	3:30
3.	"The Passion"	4:37
4.	"God So Loved"	4:39
5.	"Be Still"	8:25
6.	"Remembrance"	5:51
7.	"Valentine"	5:27
8.	"Touch of Heaven"	7:24
9.	"Lettered Love"	3:49
10.	"The Lord's Prayer"	6:19
11.	"New Wine"	8:25
12.	"So Will I (100 Billion X)"	7:07
Total length:		60:11

== Personnel ==
Credits adapted from Zendesk.

Vocals

- Aodhán King — lead vocals
- Ben Fielding — lead vocals
- Benjamin Hastings — lead vocals
- Brooke Ligertwood — lead vocals
- David Ware — lead vocals
- Jad Gillies — lead vocals
- Karina Wykes — lead vocals
- Laura Toggs — lead vocals
- Matt Crocker — lead vocals
- Michelle Cook — lead vocals
- Reuben Morgan — lead vocals
- Taya Smith — lead vocals
- Annie Garratt — additional vocals
- Chris Davenport — additional vocals
- Dee Uluirewa — additional vocals, vocals coach
- Jay Cook — additional vocals
- Jonathon “JD” Douglass — additional vocals
- Kris Hodge — additional vocals
- Renee Sieff — additional vocals
- Tyler Douglass — additional vocals

Technical, strings and horns

- Ben Whincop — live recording (at Hillsong Worship and Creative Conference, Sydney, Australia), record engineer
- Sam Gibson — mixing (at Cardiff Creative Lab, UK)
- Stephen Marcussen — mastering
- Stewart Whitmore — digital editing (for Marcussen Mastering, Hollywood, US)
- Michael Guy Chislett — record engineer, electric guitar
- Grant Konemann — record engineer, percussion, programming
- Ben Tan — record engineer, electric guitar, synthesizers, programming
- Michael Zuvella — engineer
- Omar Sierra — engineer
- Nate Baldersten — engineer
- Brandon Gillies — engineer
- Cory Halfast — engineer
- Phillip Metcalfe — engineer
- Alex Sloane — engineer
- Tyler Shields — engineer (EastWest)
- Phil Threlfall — engineer (Strings)
- Daniel Hernandez — engineer (Strings)
- Daniel McMurray — drums, percussion
- Matt Tennikoff — bass
- Nigel Hendroff — electric guitar, acoustic guitar
- Jarryd Scully — electric guitar
- Autumn Starra — piano, synthesizers
- Nathan Hughes — piano
- Ben Tennikoff — piano, synthesizers, programming
- Peter James — synthesizers
- Jack McGrath — synthesizers, programming
- David Andrew — synthesizers
- Brooke Ligertwood — acoustic guitar
- Jad Gillies — acoustic guitar
- Reuben Morgan — acoustic guitar
- Jared Haschek — string arrangements
- Corrie Haskins — violin
- Gerard Alvares — violin
- Lynette Rayner — violin
- Lily Higson-Spence — violin
- Maddie Jevons — violin
- Lisa Reynolds — violin
- Zoe Friesberg — violin
- Peter Clark — violin
- Hannah Pfaff — viola
- Ceridwen Davies — viola
- Matt Laing — viola
- Christian Read — viola
- Michaeli Witney — cello
- Karoline Kuti — cello
- Blair Harris — cello
- Alex Arai-Swale — double bass

Pre-production was handled at EastWest Studios, Hollywood, US. Post-production was handled at: Baxter House Studios (Sydney, Australia), The Base Recording Studios (South Melbourne, Australia; strings only) and Gold Dust Studios (Sydney, Australia).

Album artwork

- Jay Argaet — album artwork
- Nathan Cahyadi — album artwork
- Nick Dellis — album artwork
- Hillsong Communications — additional design

Admin

- Anthony Gomez — administration
- Laura Kelly — administration
- Alison Brown — administration
- Steve Harmeling — administration
- Chris Neal — administration

Project handling and management

- Joshua Olson — brand manager
- Jill Casey — project management
- Matthew Capper — project management
- Mystique Scully — project management
- Kris Hodge — assistant project manager

Production

- Michael Guy Chislett — producer
- Brooke Ligertwood — co-producer
- Ben Tan — assistant producer
- Ben Tennikoff — assistant producer

Executive

- Brian Houston — global senior pastor (Hillsong Church)
- Bobbie Houston — global senior pastor (Hillsong Church)
- Cassandra Langton — global creative pastor (Hillsong Church)
- Rich Langton — global creative pastor (Hillsong Church)
- Brooke Ligertwood — creative director (Hillsong Worship)

== Charts ==
=== Weekly charts ===
Chart (2018)	Peak position
Australian Albums (ARIA)	2
Canadian Albums (Billboard)	40
Dutch Albums (Album Top 100)	39
New Zealand Albums (RMNZ)	18
Norwegian Albums (VG-lista)	14
Scottish Albums (Official Charts)	48
Swiss Albums (Schweizer Hitparade)	16
UK Albums (Official Charts)	36
UK Album Downloads (Official Charts)	9
UK Christian & Gospel Albums (Official Charts)	1
UK Independent Albums (Official Charts)	9
US Billboard 200	26
US Top Christian Albums (Billboard)	2

=== Year-end charts ===
Chart (2018)	Position
Australian Albums (ARIA)	65
US Christian Albums (Billboard)	12
Chart (2019)	Position
US Christian Albums (Billboard)	12
Chart (2020)	Position
US Christian Albums (Billboard)	21
Chart (2021)	Position
US Christian Albums (Billboard)	31
Chart (2022)	Position
US Christian Albums (Billboard)	36
Chart (2023)	Position
US Christian Albums (Billboard)	39

== Certifications ==
Region	Certification	Certified units/sales
Australia (ARIA)	Gold	35,000^{‡}
^{‡} Sales+streaming figures based on certification alone.

== Release history ==
Region	Date	Version	Format	Label	Ref.
Various	6 April 2018	Live album	CD; Digital download; streaming	Hillsong Music; Capitol CMG	
Various	13 July 2018	Studio Sessions (EP)	Digital download; streaming	Hillsong Music; Capitol CMG	
Various	19 October 2018	Instrumental	Digital download; streaming	Hillsong Music; Capitol CMG	

== Hay Más ==
A Spanish-language studio recorded version of the album was released on 16 August 2019 along with a single, "Hermoso Nombre" ("What a Beautiful Name").
