= Let There Be Light (album) =

Live album by Hillsong Worship
- Released: 14 October 2016
- Recorded: 5–8 July 2016
- Venue: Qudos Bank Arena, Sydney
- Genre: Contemporary worship music
- Length: 72:03
- Label: Hillsong, Sparrow, Capitol
- Producer: Michael Guy Chislett, Joel Houston, Brooke Ligertwood

Hillsong Worship live album chronology
Open Heaven / River Wild (2015)	Let There Be Light (2016)	There Is More (2018)

Hillsong Worship chronology
Open Heaven / River Wild (2015)	Let There Be Light (2016)	The Peace Project (2017)

Singles from Let There Be Light
- 1. "Grace to Grace" Released: 17 March 2016; 2. "What a Beautiful Name" Released: 6 January 2017

Let There Be Light (stylised as let there be light) is the 25th live album of Hillsong Worship, which features several worship pastors from the Australian church Hillsong Church. The album was recorded during the 2016 Hillsong Conference at the Qudos Bank Arena from 4 July until 7 July 2016 and was released on 14 October 2016, under Hillsong Music, Sparrow Records and Capitol Christian Music Group.

Their music captures the heart and sound of Hillsong Church globally and represents the coming together of the Hillsong worship team from around the world, including Reuben Morgan, Marty Sampson, Joel Houston, Brooke Ligertwood, Ben Fielding, Taya Smith, Dave Ware, Annie Garratt and many more.

== Background ==
In March 2016, "Grace to Grace" was released and served as a single for Easter.

In July, worship leader Ben Fielding said, "We've been intentional about writing songs that will translate across the Church globally." Songs were written, rewritten, and collaborated on in the lead-up to the album recording at many of the Hillsong global campuses, such as Sydney, London, New York, and Los Angeles.

"The collaborations have been more thorough this year, and it has felt less segmented. We've been writing in the studio, and people from three different campuses in three countries will be there. Each would represent their congregation's unique sound, but working together to create something that will translate for all campuses."

The title of the album is a reference to Genesis 1:3.

== Theme ==
Rich Langton, who oversees the pastoral care of the creative team in Australia, said, "Jesus is the light of the world and we carry that too."

== Awards and accolades ==
On 9 August 2017, it was announced that Let There Be Light would be nominated for a GMA Dove Award in the Worship Album of the Year and the Long Form Video of the Year categories at the 48th Annual GMA Dove Awards. In addition to the album's nomination, the song "What a Beautiful Name" was nominated for a GMA Dove Award in the Song of the Year and Worship Song of the Year categories. On 17 October 2017, "What a Beautiful Name" won both GMA Dove Awards for Song of the Year and the Worship Song of the Year at a ceremony held at the Allen Arena in Nashville, Tennessee, with composers Brooke Ligertwood and Ben Fielding receiving the awards.

== Track listing ==
Standard edition
No.	Title	Writer(s)	Worship leader	Length
1.	"Behold (Then Sings My Soul)"	Joel Houston	Joel Houston; Brooke Ligertwood; Jad Gillies; Matt Crocker	6:46
2.	"Love So Great"	Joshua Grimmett; Reuben Morgan; Jamie Snell	David Ware; Reuben Morgan	5:19
3.	"Look To the Son"	Matt Crocker; Houston; Scott Ligertwood; Morgan; Marty Sampson	Jonathon Douglass	4:36
4.	"Crowns"	Michael Fatkin; Scott Groom; Benjamin Hastings	Benjamin Hastings	4:57
5.	"What a Beautiful Name"	Ben Fielding; Brooke Ligertwood	Brooke Ligertwood	5:41
6.	"Your Word"	Chris Davenport	Jad Gillies	7:00
7.	"Let There Be Light"	Michael Guy Chislett; Crocker; Houston; B. Ligertwood; S. Ligertwood; Jonas Myrin	Matt Crocker	7:31
8.	"In Control"	Fielding; Aodhan King	Ben Fielding	5:07
9.	"Grace To Grace"	Davenport; Houston	Taya Smith	7:06
10.	"Elohim"	Sampson	Marty Sampson, Hannah Hobbs	4:29
11.	"I Will Boast in Christ"	S. Ligertwood; Morgan	Reuben Morgan; Annie Garratt	4:52
12.	"As It Is (In Heaven)"	Houston; Fielding	Joel Houston, Taya Smith	8:39
Total length:				72:03

Digital deluxe edition
No.	Title	Worship leader	Length
13.	"What a Beautiful Name" (Acoustic)	Brooke Ligertwood	4:14
14.	"In Control" (Acoustic)	Ben Fielding	4:31
15.	"I Will Boast in Christ" (Acoustic)	Reuben Morgan; Brooke Ligertwood	5:15
16.	"Elohim" (Acoustic)	Marty Sampson	6:48
17.	"Behold New Roads" (featuring Brian Houston)		19:57
Total length:			112:48

Notes

- "Behold (Then Sings My Soul)" is inspired by "How Great Thou Art", courtesy of The Stuart Hine Trust.
- "I Will Boast in Christ" contains additional lyrics from "Nothing but the Blood", which are traditional.

== Charts ==
=== Weekly charts ===
Chart (2016)	Peak position
Australian Albums (ARIA)	2
Belgian Albums (Ultratop Flanders)	139
Belgian Albums (Ultratop Wallonia)	124
Canadian Albums (Billboard)	24
Dutch Albums (Album Top 100)	20
New Zealand Albums (RMNZ)	8
Norwegian Albums (VG-lista)	10
Scottish Albums (OCC)	48
Swedish Albums (Sverigetopplistan)	49
UK Albums (OCC)	36
UK Album Downloads (OCC)	10
UK Christian & Gospel Albums (OCC)	1
UK Independent Albums (OCC)	9
US Billboard 200	14
US Top Christian Albums (Billboard)	1

=== Year-end charts ===
Chart (2016)	Position
Australian Albums (ARIA)	85
Chart (2017)	Position
US Christian Albums (Billboard)	9
Chart (2018)	Position
US Christian Albums (Billboard)	17
Chart (2019)	Position
US Christian Albums (Billboard)	23
Chart (2020)	Position
US Christian Albums (Billboard)	31
Chart (2021)	Position
US Christian Albums (Billboard)	37
Chart (2022)	Position
US Christian Albums (Billboard)	41
Chart (2023)	Position
US Christian Albums (Billboard)	38
Chart (2025)	Position
US Christian Albums (Billboard)	45

== Certifications ==
Region	Certification	Certified units/sales
United States (RIAA)	Gold	500,000^{‡}
^{‡} Sales+streaming figures based on certification alone.

== Personnel ==
Credits adapted from Zendesk and AllMusic.

Vocals

- Annie Garratt — lead vocals
- Ben Fielding — lead vocals
- Benjamin Hastings — lead vocals
- Brooke Ligertwood — lead vocals
- David Ware — lead vocals
- Jad Gillies — lead vocals
- Joel Houston — lead vocals
- Jonathon "JD" Douglass — lead vocals
- Matt Crocker — lead vocals
- Marty Sampson — lead vocals
- Reuben Morgan — lead vocals
- Taya Smith — lead vocals
- Alexander Epa Iosefa — additional vocals
- Alexander Pappas — additional vocals
- Aodhan King — additional vocals
- Chelsea LaRosa — additional vocals
- Dee Uluirewa — additional vocals, vocals coach
- Eric Liljero — additional vocals
- Gloria Mati-Leifi — additional vocals
- Hannah Hobbs — additional vocals
- Jay Cook — additional vocals
- Katie Dodson — additional vocals
- Kris Hodge — additional vocals
- Laura Toggs — additional vocals
- Melodie Wagner — additional vocals
- Rachel Helms — additional vocals
- Renee Sieff — additional vocals
- Tarryn Stokes — additional vocals
- Tyler Douglass — additional vocals

Composer

- Aodhan King — composer
- Ben Fielding — composer
- Benjamin Hastings — composer
- Brooke Ligertwood — composer
- Chris Davenport — composer
- Jamie Snell — composer
- Joel Houston — composer
- Jonas Myrin — composer
- Joshua Grimmett — composer
- Matt Crocker — composer
- Marty Sampson — composer
- Michael Fatkin — composer
- Michael Guy Chislett — composer
- Reuben Morgan — composer
- Scott Groom — composer
- Scott Ligertwood — composer

Technical, strings and horns

- Ben Whincop — record engineer, post production engineer
- Brandon Gillies — assistant record engineer, post production engineer
- Michael Cuthbertson — assistant record engineer
- Michael Guy Chislett — post production engineer, electric guitar
- James Rudder — post production engineer
- Ian Sullivan — post production engineer
- Michael Zuvela — post production engineer
- Grant Konemann — post production engineer, choir recording
- Philip Metcalf — choir recording
- Stephen Marcussen — mastering
- Sam Gibson — mixing
- Stewart Whitmore — digital editing (for Marcussen Mastering, Hollywood, US)
- Autumn Hardman Starra — music director, keys
- Nigel Hendroff — music director, electric guitar, acoustic guitar
- Daniel McMurray — drums
- Harrison Wood — drums
- Matthew Hann — bass guitar
- Jihea Oh — bass guitar
- Matt Tennikoff — bass guitar
- Dylan Thomas — electric guitar
- Jad Gillies — electric guitar
- Jarryd Scully — electric guitar
- Joel Hingston — electric guitar
- Peter James — keys
- David Andrew — keys
- Benjamin Tennikoff — keys
- Jack McGrath — keys
- Tim Kozio — keys
- Nathan Hughes — keys
- Joel Houston — acoustic guitar
- Reuben Morgan — acoustic guitar
- Ben Fielding — acoustic guitar
- Brooke Ligertwood — acoustic guitar
- Michaeli Witney — strings
- Evie Gallardo — strings
- Salla Sinerva — strings
- Corrie Haskins — strings
- Gerard Alvares — strings
- Celeste Shackelton — strings

Event production

- Steve Pippett — production director
- Luke Fairbairn — event production manager
- Kevin Watts — assistant event production manager
- Julian Cepeda — assistant event production manager
- Ian Anderson — technical production manager
- Kayleigh Alexandre — technical director
- Eric Lechner — technical director
- Anthony Gomez — technical director
- Joanna Wakeley — assistant technical director
- Andrew Friesen — assistant technical director
- Wesley Hahn — assistant technical director
- Kelly MacLaggan — assistant technical director
- Michaela Sjøberg — assistant technical director
- Andrew Crawford — head of audio
- Omar Sierra — front of house engineer
- James Rudder — front of house engineer
- Justin "Juzzy" Arthur — front of house engineer
- Erik Viking Carlsson — front of house engineer
- Ryan Johnson — front of house engineer
- Glenn Setchfield — assistant front of house engineer
- Eddie Phiri — assistant front of house engineer
- Kyleigh Allender — front of house communication
- Kevin Kwan — front of house communication
- Reid Wall — monitor engineer
- Brad Law — monitor engineer
- Andrew Howell — monitor engineer
- Ariel Vargas — monitor engineer
- Nicholas Canavan — monitor engineer
- Caleb Taylor — assistant monitor engineer
- Jesse Small — assistant monitor engineer
- Philipp Grimm — assistant monitor engineer
- Blake Pulman — assistant monitor engineer
- Stephanie Gardner — monitor communication
- Sean Wilson — monitor communication
- Mari Bøhlerengen — monitor communication
- Jim Monk — broadcast engineer
- Nathan Steele — broadcast engineer
- Josh Mathis — assistant broadcast engineer
- Fabio George — assistant broadcast engineer
- Beverly Bangard — broadcast communication
- Ben Carbone — broadcast communication
- Ian Hendrick — lighting designer
- Jarrad Donovan — lighting director
- Kevin Stahl — lighting director
- Paul Cox — head backline technician
- Dan Yao — head backline technician
- Laura Kelly — head stage manager
- Kris Mateika — creative design
- Peter "Nubsy" Fairall — creative design
- Nathan Taylor — stage design
- Ricki Cook — engineer
- Gary Beavan — RF technician

Album administration

- Alison Brown — administrator
- Anthony Gomez — administrator
- Chris Neal — administrator
- Jill Casey — administrator
- Josh Olson — administrator
- Laura Kelly — administrator
- Steve Harmeling — administrator

Album artwork

- Jay Argaet — art director, album artwork
- Scott Ligertwood — art director
- Nathan Cahyadi — cover photographer, album artwork
- Nicholas Dellis — album artwork

Project handling and management

- Ben Fielding — product director
- Brooke Ligertwood — product director
- Cassandra Langton — product director
- Joel Houston — product director
- Michael Guy Chislett — product director
- Reuben Morgan — product director
- Matthew Capper — project manager
- Scott Ligertwood — assistant project manager
- Jay Argaet — assistant project manager
- Jose Huergo — assistant project manager, Hillsong Worship band manager
- Grant Thomson — assistant project manager
- Steve McPherson — assistant project manager
- Tim Whincop — assistant project manager

Album Production

- Michael Guy Chislett — producer
- Brooke Ligertwood — co-producer
- Joel Houston — co-producer
- Ben Tan — assistant producer
- Benjamin Tennikoff — assistant producer
- Dylan Thomas — assistant producer

Executive

- Brian Houston — global senior pastor, executive producer
- Bobbie Houston — global senior pastor
- Cassandra Langton — global creative pastor
- Richard Langton — global creative pastor

== International releases ==
There are several international releases (translations) versions of the album released in 2017:

- El Eco De Su Voz (Spanish version) (also includes songs from Hillsong Worship's Open Heaven / River Wild, Hillsong Young & Free's Youth Revival and Hillsong Worship's single "Grace to Grace")
- Que la lumière soit (French version)
- Est Werde Licht (German version)
- Toen Werd Het Licht (Dutch version)
- Да будет свет (Russian version)
- ما أجمل اسمك (Arabic version of "What a Beautiful Name")
