= Who You Say I Am (song) =

Single by Hillsong Worship

from the album There Is More
- Released: 15 June 2018
- Recorded: 2017
- Studio: Sound Stage, Nashville, Tennessee
- Genre: Contemporary worship music
- Length: 5:29
- Label: Hillsong Music; Capitol CMG
- Songwriters: Reuben Morgan; Ben Fielding
- Producers: Michael Guy Chislett; Brooke Ligertwood

Hillsong Worship singles chronology
"Seasons" (2017)	"Who You Say I Am" (2018)	"King of Kings" (2019)

Music videos
- "Who You Say I Am" (Live) on YouTube
- "Who You Say I Am" (Acoustic) on YouTube
- "Who You Say I Am" (Studio Sessions) on YouTube

"Who You Say I Am" is a song performed by Australian praise and worship group Hillsong Worship. Written by Reuben Morgan and Ben Fielding, a studio-recorded version of the song was released on 15 June 2018 as the first single from their 26th live album, There Is More (2018), by Hillsong Music Australia and Capitol Christian Music Group. It appeared on the compilation album Wow Hits 2019.

It was nominated for Top Christian Song at the 2019 Billboard Music Awards.

== Background ==
On 2 March 2018, Hillsong Worship released the live version of "Who You Say I Am" as one of two tracks available during the digital pre-order period for There Is More (2018), the live album slated for an April release. On 6 April 2018, a live acoustic version of the song was released as a bonus track on the digital edition of There Is More. Following the album's release, Hillsong Worship released Spotify Singles, which has two songs, including "Who You Say I Am" which was recorded at Sound Stage in Nashville, Tennessee, on 2 May 2018. Hillsong Worship then released a studio version of "Who You Say I Am" in digital formats on 15 June 2018 as a single. The studio version of the song impacted Australian radio on 22 June 2018. On 13 July 2018, Hillsong Worship published the studio sessions version of the song which released as a song in There Is More: Studio Sessions EP. On 19 October 2018, Hillsong Worship released an instrumental version of "Who You Say I Am" in the instrumental album titled There Is More: Instrumental.

== Music videos ==
Hillsong Worship published a live music video of "Who You Say I Am" recorded during the 2018 Hillsong Worship & Creative Conference held at Hillsong Church in Sydney, Australia, on 2 March 2018 via the video-sharing website, YouTube. On 6 March 2018, the acoustic performance video of the song was published on Hillsong Worship's YouTube channel. Hillsong Worship then published the official lyric video of the song's live version on 21 March 2018. On 13 July 2018, Hillsong Worship published the studio version of the song which released as a song in There Is More: Studio Sessions.

== Awards and nominations ==
Year	Organization	Award	Result	Ref.
2018	GMA Dove Awards	Worship Recorded Song of the Year	Nominated	
2019	We Love Christian Music Awards	Worship Song of the Year	Nominated	
2019	Billboard Music Awards	Top Christian Song	Nominated	
2019	GMA Dove Awards	Worship Song of the Year	Won	

== Track listing ==
Who You Say I Am (Studio Version)
No.	Title	Length
1.	"Who You Say I Am" (Studio Version)	3:18

== Charts ==
=== Weekly charts ===
Chart (2018)	Peak position
US Bubbling Under Hot 100 (Billboard)	25
US Hot Christian Songs (Billboard)	2
US Christian Airplay (Billboard)	1
US Christian AC (Billboard)	2
US Christian AC Indicator (Billboard)	3
US Christian CHR (Billboard)	21

=== Year-end charts ===
Chart (2018)	Peak position
US Christian AC (Billboard)	23
US Christian Airplay (Billboard)	19
US Christian Songs (Billboard)	4
Chart (2019)	Position
US Christian AC (Billboard)	18
US Christian Airplay (Billboard)	18
US Christian Songs (Billboard)	6
Chart (2020)	Position
US Christian Digital Song Sales (Billboard)	22
US Christian Streaming Songs (Billboard)	12

=== Decade-end charts ===
Chart (2010s)	Position
US Christian Songs (Billboard)	11

== Certifications ==
Region	Certification	Certified units/sales
New Zealand (RMNZ)	Platinum	30,000^{‡}
United Kingdom (BPI)	Silver	200,000^{‡}
United States (RIAA) Live	Gold	500,000^{‡}
United States (RIAA) Studio Version	Gold	500,000^{‡}
^{‡} Sales+streaming figures based on certification alone.

== Release history ==
Region	Date	Format	Label	Ref.
Various	15 June 2018	CD; Digital download; streaming	Hillsong Music Australia; Capitol Christian Music Group	
Australia	22 June 2018	Contemporary hit radio	Hillsong Music Australia	
