= What a Beautiful Name =

Single by Hillsong Worship

from the album Let There Be Light
- Released: 6 January 2017
- Genre: Contemporary worship music
- Length: 3:58
- Label: Hillsong Australia; Capitol CMG; Sparrow
- Songwriters: Ben Fielding; Brooke Ligertwood
- Producers: Michael Guy Chislett; Joel Houston; Brooke Ligertwood

Hillsong Worship singles chronology
"O Praise the Name (Anástasis)" (2016)	"What a Beautiful Name" (2017)	"Seasons" (2017)

Music video
- "What a Beautiful Name" on YouTube

"What a Beautiful Name" is a song by Australian praise and worship group Hillsong Worship. Written by bandmates Brooke Ligertwood and Ben Fielding, the song refers to the promise of salvation through Jesus Christ as represented by His Holy Name. The "genre-smashing single" contributed to Hillsong being named Billboard's Top Christian Artist of 2017. "What a Beautiful Name" won the Dove Award for Song of the Year and the Dove Award for Worship Song of the Year in 2017. It won the 2018 Grammy Award for Best Contemporary Christian Music Performance/Song. "What a Beautiful Name" was released on 6 January 2017, as the lead single from their 25th live album, Let There Be Light (2016).

== Background ==
"What a Beautiful Name" was composed in December 2015 in Sydney, Australia, for the upcoming Hillsong Conference, the annual church gathering. The scriptural foundation of the song can be found in Hebrews 1:1–1:4, Colossians 1:15–1:20 and Colossians 1:26–1:27.

== Composition ==
According to sheet music published at Sheetmusicdirect.com by Hillsong Publishing, "What a Beautiful Name" is a slow ballad that consists of 68 beats per minute. Written in common time, the song is in the key of D major. Brooke Ligertwood's vocal range spans from A_{3} to B_{4} during the song.

== Music video ==
A video for the song was recorded at the Hillsong Conference in Sydney and was released on 30 September 2016. The YouTube video has more than 620 million views as of October 2025.

== Reception ==
Music critic Matt Collar praised Hillsong Worship for their "passionate, faith-based sound" and wrote that fans of the group "will surely appreciate this emotive, uplifting Christian pop."

Jake Gosselin attributes the popularity of the song in the Christian community to a number of factors. He writes that "What a Beautiful Name" is "singable." In practice this refers to the "small vocal range" of the song which is "one note over an octave." This translates to a song that is easy to sing and which does not strain the voice with notes that are too high or too low. He also comments that the song is written in the key of D which is "the optimal key for both men and women."

=== Chart performance ===
"What a Beautiful Name" had its worldwide digital release on 6 January 2017, and topped Billboard's Hot Christian Songs chart on 25 February. The single has held the top position for 37 weeks making it the third-longest-leading No. 1 in the 14-year history of the Hot Christian chart. The song which claims the distinction as the longest-leading No. 1 is "Oceans (Where Feet May Fail)" and was released by another Hillsong unit, Hillsong United. "Oceans" led the Hot Christian chart for 61 weeks. The song has stayed on the chart for 77 weeks, making it the third longest running song on the chart.

"What a Beautiful Name" is ranked as the No. 1 song of the year for 2017 on the Christian Digital Sales chart, No. 3 on Christian Streaming Songs, and is also the No. 3 song on Christian Airplay. The song spent nine weeks as No. 1 on Christian Airplay and was Hillsong Worship's first No. 1 on the chart. What a Beautiful Name also leads the CCLI, the international licensing service for 250,000 churches.

"What a Beautiful Name" is a track from Hillsong Worship's 25th live album, Let There Be Light. The album was released on 14 October 2016, and debuted as No. 1 on the Top Christian Albums chart. For 2017, Let There be Light was ranked the No. 9 of the year.

=== Awards and accolades ===
Hillsong Worship was named Billboard's Top Christian Artist of 2017, as well as Top Christian Duo/Group. "What a Beautiful Name" earned two Dove awards, Song of the Year and Worship Song of the Year. "What a Beautiful Name" won the award for Best Contemporary Christian Music Performance/Song at the 60th Grammy Awards, the first for Hillsong Worship.

=== Criticism of lyric ===
Theologian and pastor John Piper criticized the song, in particular the lyric ‘You didn’t want heaven without us / So Jesus, you brought heaven down’:

I don’t favor the lyric... It fits too easily into a theology of a God who created because he was lonely, and then saved people for the same reason. He just can’t be happy without us.

— John Piper

Another pastor, Sam Storms also acknowledged criticisms of the lyric.

It’s the statement: “You didn’t want heaven without us.” Some have argued that this line suggests that Jesus is needy, that he is, in himself, somehow deficient and less than complete and only we, his people can fill up what he lacks... But we know from numerous biblical texts that God needs nothing... he is altogether self-sufficient and independent.

— Sam Storms

Hillsong responded to the criticisms of the song with a blog by singer Ben Fielding. Fielding cited John 17:24 and other verses to defend the scriptural inspiration behind the criticized lyric.

In verse 2, we wanted to describe the love of God, who, though in need of nothing, so loved the world that He chose to send His one and only Son, so that we may not perish but have eternal life with Him.

— Ben Fielding

== Live performances ==
The song was recorded at a live performance at the annual Hillsong Conference in 2016. Hillsong performed the song at the 48th Annual Dove Awards held at Allen Arena in Nashville. The performance was well received and "had audience members on their feet with their hands in the air."

When asked about performing the song in an interview with Billboard's Jim Asker, Ligertwood said about the audience:

"Because the audience is part of the church and we sing these songs in church regularly, most of the people in attendance were already familiar with the tracks. As an audience, they are just super gracious and welcoming. Our mission is that the music will resonate with them. We're not really performing—we're simply vessels.

Finally, she said about performing the song:

"I guess that when I am leading the song, my voice is me, but it's also my prayer first, that I am there to serve people and link with them in the presence of God. When you connect with people, you can feel their spirits being lifted. It's really the beauty of singing something about the wonder and power of Jesus. When people connect, it's freeing for them and breaks chains and creates faith."

== Other versions ==
In July 2017, the Voices of Lee, the "elite" a cappella singing group, posted a video of the song to their Facebook page. The cover was an instant hit and reached the so-called viral threshold of 5 million views in two days. As of October 2017, it had amassed 33 million views. The group represents Lee University in Tennessee; the video was filmed in the school's chapel.

== Track listing ==
Digital download
No.	Title	Length
1.	"What a Beautiful Name"	3:58

Digital download – EP
No.	Title	Length
1.	"What a Beautiful Name"	4:00
2.	"What a Beautiful Name" (Live)	5:43
3.	"What a Beautiful Name" (Alternate Acoustic)	3:45
4.	"What a Beautiful Name" (Orchestral Selah)	3:30
5.	"What a Beautiful Name" (Gospel Version)	4:44
6.	"What a Beautiful Name" (Y&F Remix)	3:58

== Charts ==
Weekly charts
Chart (2016–17)	Peak position
US Bubbling Under Hot 100 (Billboard)	7
US Christian Songs (Billboard)	1

Year-end charts
Chart (2017)	Position
US Christian Songs (Billboard)	1
US Christian Airplay (Billboard)	3
US Christian AC (Billboard)	4
Chart (2018)	Position
US Christian Songs (Billboard)	10

=== Decade-end charts ===
Chart (2010s)	Position
US Christian Songs (Billboard)	3

== Certifications ==
Region	Certification	Certified units/sales
United Kingdom (BPI)	Silver	200,000^{‡}
United States (RIAA)	Platinum	1,000,000^{‡}
^{‡} Sales+streaming figures based on certification alone.

== Release history ==
Region	Date	Format	Label	Ref.
Worldwide	6 January 2017	Digital download	Hillsong Australia; Capitol CMG; Sparrow	
Worldwide	31 March 2017	Digital download (EP)	Hillsong Australia; Sparrow	
