= Glorious Ruins =

Live album by Hillsong Worship
- Released: 2 July 2013
- Recorded: 27 and 28 October 2012 (Sydney, Australia); 17 February 2013 (London, England)
- Venue: Hillsong Convention Centre (Sydney, Australia), London Dominion Theatre (London, England)
- Genre: Contemporary worship
- Label: Hillsong, Capitol, Sparrow
- Producer: Reuben Morgan; Joel Houston

Hillsong Music Australia Live praise & worship chronology
Cornerstone (2012)	Glorious Ruins (2013)	No Other Name (2014)

Glorious Ruins is the 22nd live worship album by Hillsong Church. It was recorded live in London, England, and Sydney, Australia by the Hillsong Worship team from around the world including Reuben Morgan, Joel Houston, Ben Fielding, Hillsong United, and international teams from London, Stockholm, and Cape Town. The album includes 12 songs including "Man of Sorrows", "Glorious Ruins", "Christ Is Enough", "Anchor", and "You Crown the Year". It was released on 28 June 2013 in Australia and New Zealand and on 2 July 2013 internationally. The album reached No. 3 on the ARIA Albums Chart.

== Background ==
On 27 and 28 October 2012, Hillsong Live recorded the first part at the Hillsong Convention Centre in Sydney with a worship night called "This Is for Everyone". The second part of the album was recorded by Hillsong London at London's Dominion Theatre on 17 February 2013. "Man of Sorrows", the first single from the album, was released as a free download just before Easter.

Hillsong Live announced the new album by releasing its cover artwork 3 April 2013. A trailer for the album and the live video for "Man of Sorrows" was released on 4 June 2013. The album was officially released on 2 July 2013.

== Vision and inspiration ==
"Let the ruins come to life | In the beauty of Your Name | Rising up from the ashes | God forever You reign"

This chorus of the title track, Glorious Ruins, was an underlying theme through the life of Hillsong Church in the lead up to the Hillsong Live praise & worship album recording, Glorious Ruins. It’s a vivid image which captures the imagination and stirs the soul. Brian Houston, Senior Pastor of Hillsong Church explains, “Ruins can speak of crushing defeat or perhaps of something abandoned, but the good news today is that the ruins come to life. …Through Jesus Christ what we look at is ruins that become glorious..." Whether it be through times of personal devotion or in your church, we pray that the lyrics contained in this album stir your faith & love in Jesus Christ.

== Track listing ==
Standard Edition
No.	Title	Writer(s)	Worship leader	Length
1.	"Always Will"	Jay Cook, Jarred Rogers, Jamie Snell	Jay Cook	3:58
2.	"You Never Fail"	Brandon Carter, Chris Davenport, Joel Houston	Joel Houston	5:11
3.	"Christ Is Enough"	Reuben Morgan, Jonas Myrin	Reuben Morgan	5:20
4.	"Where the Spirit of the Lord Is"	Ben Fielding	Ben Fielding	5:25
5.	"Glorious Ruins"	Matt Crocker, Houston	Joel Houston	8:53
6.	"Closer"	Joel Davies, Jason Ingram, Braden Lang, Morgan	David Ware	4:25
7.	"God Who Saves"	Sam Knock	Jonathon Douglass	4:27
8.	"To Be Like You"	Crocker, Brooke Fraser	Matt Crocker	6:12
9.	"Man of Sorrows"	Crocker, Fraser	Jad Gillies, Annie Garratt	5:20
10.	"We Glorify Your Name"	Ed Cash, Ingram, Matt Maher, Morgan, Chris Tomlin	Reuben Morgan, Juliet Adekambi	5:50
11.	"You Crown the Year (Psalm 65:11)"	Fraser, Morgan	Laura Toggs, Reuben Morgan	5:24
12.	"Anchor"	Fielding, Dean Ussher	Ben Fielding	6:30
Total length:				66:05

Deluxe Edition
No.	Title	Writer(s)	Worship leader	Length
1.	"Always Will (Intro)"			1:13
2.	"Always Will"	Jay Cook, Jarred Rogers, Jamie Snell	Jay Cook	3:58
3.	"You Never Fail"	Brandon Carter, Chris Davenport, Joel Houston	Joel Houston	5:11
4.	"Christ Is Enough"	Reuben Morgan, Jonas Myrin	Reuben Morgan	5:20
5.	"Where the Spirit of the Lord Is"	Ben Fielding	Ben Fielding	5:25
6.	"Glorious Ruins"	Matt Crocker, Houston	Joel Houston	8:53
7.	"Closer"	Joel Davies, Jason Ingram, Braden Lang, Morgan	David Ware	4:25
8.	"God Who Saves"	Sam Knock	Jonathon Douglass	4:27
9.	"To Be Like You"	Crocker, Brooke Fraser	Matt Crocker	6:12
10.	"Man of Sorrows"	Crocker, Fraser	Jad Gillies, Annie Garratt	5:20
11.	"We Glorify Your Name"	Ed Cash, Ingram, Matt Maher, Morgan, Chris Tomlin	Reuben Morgan, Juliet Adekambi	5:50
12.	"You Crown the Year (Psalm 65:11)"	Fraser, Morgan	Laura Toggs, Reuben Morgan	5:24
13.	"Anchor"	Fielding, Dean Ussher	Ben Fielding	6:30
14.	"Lift You Higher"	Tekiva Ledwidge, Nait Masuku, Morgan	Eric Liljero	3:52
15.	"Only You"	Crocker, Nathan Finochio, Carl Lentz, Dylan Thomas	Tyler Braland	5:48
Total length:				78:53

DVD / Blu-ray
No.	Title	Writer(s)	Length
1.	"God Who Saves" (Jonathon Douglass (JD))	Sam Knock
2.	"Always Will" (Jay Cook)	Jay Cook, Jarred Rogers & Jamie Snell
3.	"You Never Fail" (Joel Houston)	Joel Houston, Brandon Carter & Chris Davenport
4.	"Christ Is Enough" (Reuben Morgan)	Reuben Morgan & Jonas Myrin
5.	"Where the Spirit of the Lord Is" (Ben Fielding)	Ben Fielding
6.	"Glorious Ruins" (Joel Houston)	Joel Houston & Matt Crocker
7.	"Closer" (Dave Ware)	Braden Lang, Jason Ingram, Joel Davies & Reuben Morgan
8.	"To Be Like You" (Matt Crocker)	Matt Crocker & Brooke Fraser
9.	"Man of Sorrows" (Jad Gillies & Annie Garratt)	Brooke Fraser & Matt Crocker
10.	"We Glorify Your Name" (Reuben Morgan & Juliet Adekambi)	Ed Cash, Jason Ingram, Matt Maher, Reuben Morgan & Chris Tomlin
11.	"You Crown the Year (Psalm 65:11)" (Laura Toganivalu & Reuben Morgan)	Brooke Fraser & Reuben Morgan
12.	"Anchor" (Ben Fielding)	Ben Fielding & Dean Ussher
13.	"King of Heaven" (Matt Crocker)	Matt Crocker, Salomon Ligthelm & Ryan Taubert
14.	"A Million Suns" (Annie Garratt & Jad Gillies)	Scott Ligertwood & Dean Ussher
15.	"Missio Dei"
16.	"Glorious Ruins" (Brian Houston Message)	Brian Houston

== Personnel ==
Worship leaders

- Juliet Adekambi
- Jay Cook
- Matt Crocker
- Jonathan 'JD' Douglass
- Ben Fielding
- Annie Garratt
- Jad Gillies
- Joel Houston
- Reuben Morgan
- Laura Toganivalu
- David Ware

Vocals

- Nina Mityuk
- Sam Evans
- Cassey Zschech
- Dan Barrett
- Ashley John Baptiste
- Jill Marie Cooper
- Jenny Deacon
- Katie Dodson
- Hannah Hobbs
- Jorim Kelly
- Ingrid Kennedy
- Brad Kohring
- Ana Loback
- Collena Masuku
- Nait Masuku
- Sheila Mpofu
- Alexander Pappas
- Dean Ussher
- Esther Volstad
- Kevin Curiel
- Marcus Temu

Music directors

- Chris Davenport
- Gio Galanti
- Autumn Hardman
- Nigel Hendroff

Electric guitars

- Ben Fielding
- Chris Davenport
- Nigel Hendroff
- Joel Hingston
- David Kennedy
- Timon Klein
- Dave Marinelli
- Isaac Soon
- Dylan Thomas
- Jad Gillies

Acoustic guitars

- Tyler Braland
- Matt Crocker
- Ben Fielding
- Joel Houston
- Kevin Curiel
- Reuben Morgan
- Herny Seely
- Brian 'BJ' Phodham

Keys

- David Andrew
- Moses Byun
- Adam Dodson
- Gio Galanti
- Dave George
- Autumn Hardman
- Peter James
- Matt Hann
- Thiago Pereira
- Ryan Taubert
- Ben Tennikoff

Bass

- Ike Graham
- Matt Hann
- Ntando 'Bob' Mpofu
- Jihea Oh

Drums

- Daniel McMurray
- Harrison Wood
- Simon Kobler
- Brendan Tan

Percussion

- Bede Benjamin-Korporaal
- Hristo Dushev
- JP Starra

Trombone

- Marc Warry

French Horn

- Elizabeth Gorringe

Violin

- Evie Gallardo

Cello

- Michaeli Witney

== Reception ==
Professional ratings
Review scores
Source	Rating
Louder Than The Music	4.5/5 stars

Before its release, the album received positive reviews from Louder Than the Music's Jono Davies, who wrote, "there aren't many Christian bands that make the world stop and listen when they release a new album, but Hillsong are one of them." And describes the album's sound as "is this album much of the same classic Hillsong sound, or a new fresh style of worship? Well, a bit of both to be honest, but more on that later." And ends saying "How do you sum up an album like this? I don't know if words are enough. People will love this album simply because it's another classic from Hillsong, who seem to be getting better and better with each release. The band have been more creative in the last few years, which must be commended. I actually think the songs on this album are stronger than previous albums. If some albums in the past worked well as a package, this album has much stronger songs that can stand on their own in times of worship." The album received three four-and-a-half-star-out-of-five ratings.

== Charts ==
=== Weekly charts ===
Chart (2013)	Peak position
Australian Albums (ARIA)	3
Belgian Albums (Ultratop Flanders)	185
Dutch Albums (Album Top 100)	21
Norwegian Albums (VG-lista)	6
New Zealand Albums (RMNZ)	19
UK Albums (OCC)	73
UK Album Downloads (OCC)	40
UK Christian & Gospel Albums (OCC)	1
UK Independent Albums (OCC)	20
US Billboard 200	18
US Top Christian Albums (Billboard)	2

=== Year-end charts ===
Chart (2013)	Position
Australia (ARIA)	94
