= Beyond Us =

Studio album by Aodhán King
- Released: October 18, 2024
- Genres: Contemporary Christian; pop; worship
- Length: 54:17
- Language: English
- Labels: Independent; Anotherland Records; Capitol CMG
- Producers: Ben Tan; Jimmy James; Jason Ingram; Aodhán King; Tim Fitz

Singles from Beyond Us
- 1. "Thank You So Much Jesus" Released: August 16, 2024; 2. "Without You" Released: September 6, 2024; 3. "Pray You never Leave" Released: September 6, 2024; 4. "Yesterday, Today & Tomorrow" Released: September 27, 2024

Beyond Us is the debut studio album by Australian Christian musician Aodhán King. The album was released independently and distributed through Anotherland Records and Capitol CMG. Four songs from the album were released as singles, "Thank You So Much Jesus", "Without You", "Pray You Never Leave", and "Yesterday, Today & Tomorrow". An album track, "Time", also charted, reaching No. 27 on the Billboard Hot Christian Songs chart. The album features guest appearances from Paul Klein, Griff, Lauren Daigle, Jenna Raine, and Hannah Joy. It was released on October 18, 2024.

== Track listing ==
No.	Title	Writer(s)	Producer(s)	Length
1.	"Prepare the Way"	Aodhán King; Jason Ingram; Jimmy James	Ben Tan; Jimmy James; Jason Ingram	4:43
2.	"Thank You So Much Jesus" (with Paul Klein)	Aodhán King; Ben Tan; Paul Klein	Aodhán King; Jason Ingram; Ben Tan	4:09
3.	"Without You"	Aodhán King; Ben Tan; Benjamin William Hastings	Aodhán King; Ben Tan; Jason Ingram	3:47
4.	"Yesterday, Today & Tomorrow" (with Griff)	Aodhán King; Jimmy James; Sarah Griff	Jimmy James	3:22
5.	"Made to Worship"	Aodhán King; Josh Grimmett	Aodhán King; Ben Tan; Jason Ingram; Jimmy James	4:16
6.	"Pray You Never Leave"	Aodhán King; Jason Ingram	Ben Tan; Jason Ingram	4:00
7.	"Free at Last"	Aodhán King; Hannah Joy; Tim Fitz	Aodhán King; Ben Tan; Jason Ingram; Tim Fitz	3:01
8.	"Time" (with Lauren Daigle)	Aodhán King; Lauren Daigle	Aodhán King; Ben Tan; Jason Ingram	3:49
9.	"What Would It Be Like?"	Aodhán King; Ben Tan	Ben Tan	4:01
10.	"Still Worthy" (with Jenna Raine)	Aodhán King; Jenna Raine	Ben Tan; Jason Ingram	5:31
11.	"Whole World"	Aodhán King; Ben Tan	Ben Tan; Jason Ingram	5:13
12.	"How Can It Be?" (with Hannah Joy)	Aodhán King; Hannah Joy; Tim Fitz	Aodhán King; Jason Ingram; Tim Fitz; Ben Tan	4:15
13.	"My Last Refrain"	Aodhán King; Bede Benjamin-Korporaal; Jason Ingram	Ben Tan; Jason Ingram	4:04
Total length:				54:17
