= No Other Name =

Live album by Hillsong Worship
- Released: 1 July 2014
- Recorded: February–July 2014
- Venue: Allphones Arena, Sydney
- Genre: Contemporary worship music
- Label: Capitol, Hillsong, Sparrow.
- Producer: Michael Guy Chislett

Hillsong Worship chronology
Glorious Ruins (2013)	No Other Name (2014)	Open Heaven / River Wild (2015)

Singles from No Other Name
- 1. "Calvary" Released: 3 April 2014; 2. "No Other Name" Released: 11 July 2014

No Other Name is the 23rd worship album by Hillsong and was released on 1 July 2014. This live album is named after the 2014 Hillsong Conference. The recording team for this album includes Reuben Morgan, Ben Fielding, Annie Garratt, Jad Gillies, David Ware, Jay Cook, Joel Houston, Matt Crocker, Taya Smith, Hannah Hobbs and Marty Sampson, among others.

The album peaked at No. 2 on the ARIA Albums Chart and has since been certified gold by the Australian Recording Industry Association for sales exceeding 35,000 copies. In the United States, the album has sold 61,000 copies as of September 2015. Both "This I Believe (The Creed)" and "Broken Vessels (Amazing Grace)" have charted into the Christian sect of iTunes top 40. Although "This I Believe (The Creed)" wasn't released as a single, it has received radio airplay.

== History ==
On February, Hillsong Worship through their page announced that they were working and recording a new album to be released for July 2014, and some of the songs included "This I Believe" and "Calvary".

In March they announced that they were working on the cover of the new album, joking that they didn't even know the name of it at all.

On 3 April, they released the album's first single, a song titled "Calvary" as an Easter single. Then, on 23 April, Cass Langton of Hillsong Church, posted a blog on Hillsong Collected, in which she talked about the new recording, announcing that Michael Chislett was producing the album. Meanwhile, Jay Argaet shot the new album cover on 23 April in Times Square, NYC.

On 5 May, they revealed the album name by posting the cover artwork of the album, which is a picture of Times Square screens showing the text "No Other Name, Jesus".

== Recording ==
The album recording started on February. While, the live DVD has been recorded at the Allphones Arena on Hillsong Conference 2014.

== Awards and accolades ==
This album was No. 2 on the Worship Leader's Top 20 Albums of 2014 list.

The song, "This I Believe (The Creed)", was No. 2 on the Worship Leader's Top 20 Songs of 2014 list.

== Track listing ==
Standard edition
No.	Title	Writer(s)	Worship leader	Length
1.	"This I Believe (The Creed)"	Matt Crocker, Ben Fielding	Matt Crocker	6:41
2.	"Heaven and Earth"	Fielding, Sam Knock	David Ware	5:02
3.	"Broken Vessels (Amazing Grace)"	Joel Houston, Jonas Myrin	Taya Smith	9:28
4.	"No Other Name"	Houston, Myrin	Joel Houston; Jad Gillies	7:20
5.	"Depths"	Brooke Fraser, Marty Sampson	Marty Sampson	6:17
6.	"Calvary"	Reuben Morgan, Myrin, Mrs. Walter G. Taylor	Reuben Morgan	4:13
7.	"Thank You Jesus"	Crocker, Hannah Hobbs	Hannah Hobbs	5:50
8.	"All Things New"	Fielding, Dean Ussher	Ben Fielding	4:11
9.	"My Story"	Morgan, Jarrad Rogers	Reuben Morgan	4:59
10.	"Our Father"	Fraser, Scott Ligertwood, Myrin	Annie Garratt; Katie Dodson	4:42
11.	"Mountain"	Crocker, Houston	Jad Gillies	6:47

Digital deluxe edition
No.	Title	Length
12.	"Pioneer Again" (Brian Houston Message)	27:45
13.	"Broken Vessels (Amazing Grace)" (Alternate Version)	5:10
14.	"Calvary" (Alternate Version)	3:48
15.	"This I Believe (The Creed)" (Alternate Version)	4:59
16.	"All Things New" (Alternate Version)	3:41
17.	"Thank You Jesus" (Alternate Version)	5:34
18.	"No Other Name" (Radio Version)	3:57

DVD
No.	Title	Length
1.	"Heaven and Earth"	4:55
2.	"Broken Vessels (Amazing Grace)"	7:42
3.	"No Other Name"	7:02
4.	"My Story"	4:19
5.	"Thank You Jesus"	6:25
6.	"Calvary"	4:22
7.	"This I Believe (The Creed)"	6:34
8.	"All Things New"	5:07
9.	"Our Father"	4:47
10.	"Depths"	4:36
11.	"Mountain"	8:01
12.	"No Other Name" (Message from Brian Houston)	47:00
13.	"Behind The Scenes - Studios 301"	1:30
14.	"This I Believe (The Creed)" (Song Story)	4:06
15.	"Oceans (Where Feet May Fail)" (by Hillsong United)	8:08
16.	"Alive" (by Hillsong Young & Free)	4:45
17.	"Sinking Deep" (by Hillsong Young & Free)	7:15
18.	"Victory" (Music Video by Hillsong College)	5:08

== Singles ==
"Calvary" was the first single and was released on 3 April 2014 on their website. An acoustic, pre-release version of the song, sung by Reuben Morgan, was made available for free download.

"No Other Name" was released on 11 July 2014 on Christian FM stations.

== Chart positions and reception ==
Professional ratings
Review scores
Source	Rating
Louder Than the Music	5/5 stars

=== Weekly ===
Chart (2014)	Peak position
Australian Albums (ARIA)	2
Belgian Albums (Ultratop Flanders)	123
Canadian Albums (Billboard)	24
Danish Albums (Hitlisten)	13
Dutch Albums (Album Top 100)	26
New Zealand Albums (RMNZ)	8
Norwegian Albums (VG-lista)	6
UK Albums (OCC)	53
UK Christian & Gospel Albums (OCC)	1
UK Independent Albums (OCC)	8
US Billboard 200	13
US Top Christian Albums (Billboard)	1

=== Year-end ===
Chart (2014)	Position
Australian Albums Chart	50

== Certifications ==
Region	Certification	Certified units/sales
Australia (ARIA)	Gold	35,000^{^}
^{^} Shipments figures based on certification alone.
