= Open Heaven / River Wild =

Live album and Video album by Hillsong Worship
- Released: 16 October 2015
- Recorded: 29 June – 3 July 2015
- Venues: Allphones Arena, Sydney
- Genre: Contemporary worship music
- Length: 67:42
- Labels: Hillsong, Sparrow, Capitol
- Producer: Michael Guy Chislett

Hillsong Worship chronology
| No Other Name (2014) | Open Heaven / River Wild (2015) | Let There Be Light (2016) |

Singles from Open Heaven / River Wild
- 1. "One Thing" Released: 18 September 2015; 2. "O Praise the Name (Anástasis)" Released: 1 July 2016

Open Heaven / River Wild (stylised as OPEN HEAVEN / River Wild) is the 24th live album of Hillsong Worship, which consists of several worship pastors from Australian church Hillsong Church. The album was recorded during the 2015 Hillsong Conference at the Sydney SuperDome (currently named the Qudos Bank Arena) from 29 June until 3 July 2015 and was released on 16 October 2015, under Hillsong Music, Sparrow Records and Capitol Christian Music Group; this marks the first time the church's annual worship album was recorded entirely during the conference, as opposed to the annual July releases that coincide with the event. Michael Guy Chislett oversaw production of the album, while Hillsong senior pastor Brian Houston and his son, worship leader Joel Houston, served as executive producers.

Open Heaven / River Wild features several prominent vocalists of Hillsong, including Reuben Morgan, Joel Houston and Marty Sampson, as well as the Hillsong United band and the Hillsong Young & Free group. Following the Easter release of "O Praise the Name (Anástasis)", the album's lead single, "One Thing", was released on 18 September 2015.

== Background ==
In March 2015, "O Praise the Name (Anástasis)" was released as a free download on Hillsong's website, and served as a single for Easter. David Ware served as vocalist for "O Praise the Name", while prominent worship leader Marty Sampson co-wrote the song. Sampson played the song for Hillsong global creative director Cass Langton, who was "overwhelmed" by the song, saying, "The lyrics… they captivated me. The thoughts in the song opened my eyes again to the Gospel story, and I felt the emotions of the death and resurrection of Jesus Christ all over again — I could hardly wait to hear our church worship to this song."

On 14 June 2015, Langton announced through a blog post that the recording of the next annual live worship album will be at the 2015 Hillsong Conference at the Allphones Arena in Sydney, Australia, marking the first time the album would be recorded entirely during the conference, as opposed to the typical July releases that coincide with the event.

On 17 August 2015, Hillsong released a teaser video on various social media accounts; the title of the album as well as the cover art and the 16 October release date were announced the next day. On 3 September 2015 Hillsong released the trailer to YouTube along with the track-listing for the new album.

== Recording ==
The live worship album and DVD were recorded during the span of the 2015 Hillsong Conference in Sydney, Australia from 29 June to 3 July.

Worship leaders from several Hillsong Church locations, such as Aryel Murphy from Hillsong Los Angeles, Chris Davenport from Hillsong New York, Tarryn Stokes from Hillsong Melbourne and Reuben Morgan from Hillsong London, were included in the recording.

== Promotion ==
=== Singles ===
"One Thing" was released on 18 September 2015 via iTunes as a pre-order single.

"O Praise the Name (Anastásis)" was released on 2 October 2015 via iTunes as a pre-order single.

== Critical reception ==
Professional ratings
Review scores
| Source | Rating |
|---|---|
| The Christian Beat | 4.5/5 stars |
| Jesus Wired | 75/100 |
| New Release Today | 4/5 stars |
| Worship Leader | 5/5 stars |

Barry Westman, rating the album five stars for Worship Leader, says, "this collection of songs will provide the church with a fresh batch of songs for corporate worship with a heartfelt and intimate feel." Awarding the album four stars at New Release Today, Kevin Davis states, "These are very passionate worship songs sung with vocal sincerity and reverence with biblically based lyrics." Madeleine Dittmer, giving the album four and a half stars from The Christian Beat, writes, "The twelve tracks on this album are beautifully written songs of praise that draw listeners in to a sacred place of worship." Indicating in a 75-percent review at Jesus Wired, Rebekah Joy describes, "[the album] really provides some good anthems of worship that really fit in with the Hillsong brand."

== Track listing ==
Standard edition
| No. | Title | Writer(s) | Worship leader | Length |
|---|---|---|---|---|
| 1. | "O Praise the Name (Anástasis)" | Benjamin Hastings; Marty Sampson; Dean Ussher | Marty Sampson | 5:29 |
| 2. | "Love on the Line" | Brooke Ligertwood; Scott Ligertwood; Aryel Murphy | Aryel Murphy | 4:56 |
| 3. | "One Thing" | Joel Houston; Aodhán King; Dylan Thomas | Aodhan King | 6:13 |
| 4. | "Open Heaven (River Wild)" | Matt Crocker; Sampson | Matt Crocker; Hannah Hobbs | 7:29 |
| 5. | "Transfiguration" | King; B. Ligertwood; S. Ligertwood; Taya Smith | Taya Smith | 5:36 |
| 6. | "What a Saviour" | Chris Davenport; Houston | Joel Houston | 6:57 |
| 7. | "Heart Like Heaven" | Crocker; Houston | Jad Gillies | 7:28 |
| 8. | "Jesus I Need You" | B. Ligertwood; S. Ligertwood; Reuben Morgan; Jarred Rogers | David Ware; Reuben Morgan | 4:59 |
| 9. | "Here with You" | Joshua Grimmett; Johannes Shore; Jamie Snell | Tarryn Stokes | 4:20 |
| 10. | "In God We Trust" | Ben Fielding; Eric Liljero; Morgan | Ben Fielding; Annie Garratt | 4:01 |
| 11. | "Faithfulness" | Davenport | Chris Davenport | 5:38 |
| 12. | "Never Forsaken" | Hastings; Hannah Hobbs | Laura Toggs | 4:36 |
| Total length: | | | | 67:42 |

Digital deluxe edition
| No. | Title | Writer(s) | Worship leader | Length |
|---|---|---|---|---|
| 13. | "Here Now (Madness)" (featuring Hillsong United) | Michael Guy Chislett; Houston | Joel Houston; Jad Gillies; Taya Smith | 6:55 |
| 14. | "Rule" (featuring Hillsong United) | Crocker; Houston; Benjamin Tennikoff | Jonathon Douglass | 4:13 |
| 15. | "This Is Living" (featuring Hillsong Young & Free) | Joel Davies; King | Aodhan King | 3:34 |
| 16. | "Pursue / All I Need Is You" (Medley; featuring Hillsong Young & Free) | Hobbs; King; Sampson | Aodhan King; Tracy Pratt | 7:43 |
| Total length: | | | | 90:07 |

DVD
| No. | Title | Worship leader | Length |
|---|---|---|---|
| 1. | "O Praise the Name (Anástasis)" | Marty Sampson | 5:24 |
| 2. | "Love on the Line" | Aryel Murphy | 4:54 |
| 3. | "One Thing" | Aodhan King | 6:14 |
| 4. | "Open Heaven (River Wild)" | Matt Crocker; Hannah Hobbs | 7:28 |
| 5. | "Transfiguration" | Taya Smith | 5:35 |
| 6. | "What a Saviour" | Joel Houston | 6:48 |
| 7. | "Heart Like Heaven" | Jad Gillies | 7:27 |
| 8. | "Jesus I Need You" | David Ware | 5:11 |
| 9. | "Here with You" | Tarryn Stokes | 4:29 |
| 10. | "In God We Trust" | Ben Fielding; Annie Garratt | 3:59 |
| 11. | "Faithfulness" | Chris Davenport | 5:35 |
| 12. | "Never Forsaken" | Tarryn Stokes | 4:10 |
| 13. | "Here Now (Madness)" | Joel Houston; Jad Gillies; Taya Smith | 7:04 |
| 14. | "Rule" | Jonathon Douglass | 4:12 |
| 15. | "This Is Living" | Aodhan King | 3:57 |
| 16. | "Pursue / All I Need Is You" (Medley) | Aodhan King; Tracy Pratt | 7:42 |
| Total length: | | | 90:09 |

== Personnel ==
- David Andrew – keyboards
- Michael Guy Chislett – electric guitar
- Matt Crocker – lead vocals, worship leader, acoustic guitar
- Adam Crosariol – bass guitar
- Chris Davenport – lead vocals, worship leader, acoustic guitar
- Jonathon "JD" Douglass – lead vocals, worship leader
- Tyler Douglass – additional vocals
- Katie Dodson – lead vocals, worship leader
- Ben Fielding – lead vocals, worship leader, acoustic guitar
- Annie Garratt – lead vocals, worship leader
- Taya Gaukrodger – lead vocals, worship leader
- Jad Gillies – lead vocals, worship leader, acoustic and electric guitar
- Autumn Hardman – keyboards
- Matt Hann – bass guitar
- Nigel Hendroff – acoustic guitar, electric guitar
- Hannah Hobbs – lead vocals, worship leader
- Joel Houston – lead vocals, worship leader, acoustic guitar
- Alexander Epa Iosefa – additional vocals
- Aodhán King – lead vocals, worship leader
- Peter James – keyboards
- Simon Kobler – drums
- Daniel McMurray – drums
- Reuben Morgan – lead vocals, worship leader, acoustic guitar
- Jihea Oh – bass guitar
- Alexander Pappas – additional vocals
- Marty Sampson – lead vocals, worship leader, acoustic guitar
- Renee Sieff – additional vocals
- Tarryn Stokes – lead vocals, worship leader
- Aryel Temu – lead vocals, worship leader
- Benjamin Tennikoff – keyboards
- Dylan Thomas – electric guitar
- Laura Toggs – lead vocals, worship leader
- Melodie Wagner – additional vocals
- David Ware – lead vocals, worship leader
- Harrison Wood – drums

== Charts ==
| Chart (2015) | Peak position |
|---|---|
| Australian Albums (ARIA) | 1 |
| Belgian Albums (Ultratop Flanders) | 137 |
| Canadian Albums (Billboard) | 37 |
| Dutch Albums (Album Top 100) | 19 |
| New Zealand Albums (RMNZ) | 4 |
| Norwegian Albums (VG-lista) | 3 |
| Swedish Albums (Sverigetopplistan) | 24 |
| UK Albums (Official Charts) | 39 |
| US Billboard 200 | 25 |
| US Top Christian Albums (Billboard) | 1 |

== Certifications ==
Certifications for Open Heaven / River Wild
| Region | Certification | Certified units/sales |
|---|---|---|
| New Zealand (RMNZ) | Gold | 7,500^{‡} |
^{‡} Sales+streaming figures based on certification alone.
