= Genesis 32 =

Genesis 32 may refer to:

- Vayishlach, the Jewish parashah which covers this chapter from the Book of Genesis
- The reconciliation of Jacob and Esau, recounted in this chapter.
