= Friar Alessandro =

Italian friar and tenor singer

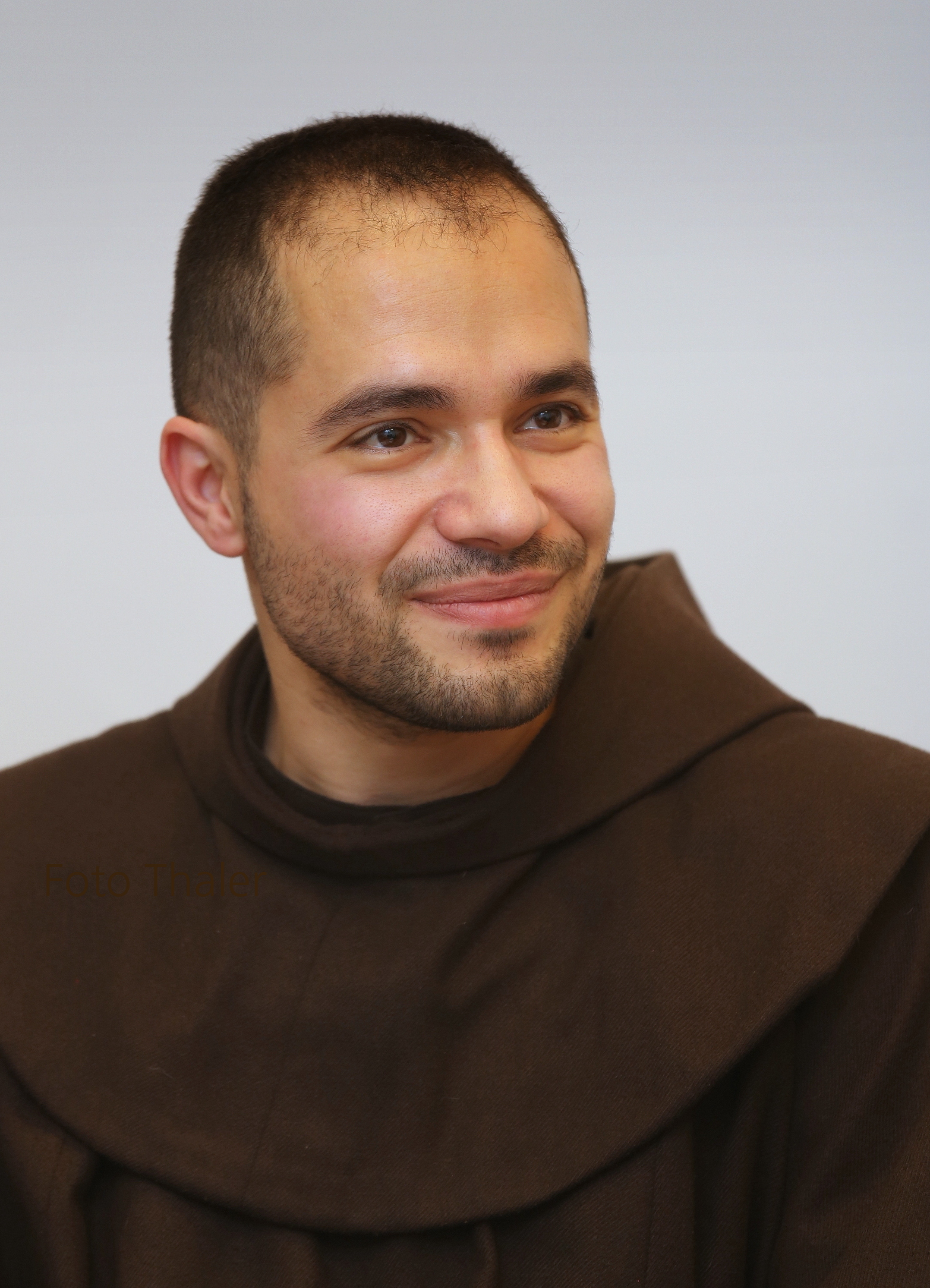
Fra Alessandro Brustenghi in 2014

Alessandro Giacomo Brustenghi, OFM (born 21 April 1978), better known as Friar Alessandro, is an Italian Franciscan friar and a tenor singer of religious music. He is also the first religious brother to land an exclusive record contract with a major record label, in this case Universal Music.

Friar Alessandro's debut album is called Voice from Assisi (in Italian La voce da Assisi or in French La voix d'Assise). It was released on 15 October 2012. The initial single is a double-A side release, the tracks "Panis Angelicus" and "Sancta Maria". The first is the penultimate strophe of the hymn Sacris solemniis written by Saint Thomas Aquinas for the Feast of Corpus Christi and the second is from Cavalleria rusticana.

== Biography ==
Alessandro Brustenghi was born in Perugia, Italy. He started playing music at the age of 9, with a desire to be a percussionist. He started learning to play the piano and organ at 14. He also took part in choirs, but never as a lead singer. At 21, he joined the Franciscan order and sang at the Basilica of Santa Maria degli Angeli at Assisi, Italy where he worked as a joiner-carpenter.

The friars first noticed his beautiful tenor voice when he had to pass a vocal exam to enter the ministry. Some of his recordings were introduced to Mike Hedges (producer to U2, Dido, The Cure, Manic Street Preachers amongst others) who, after hearing his voice, offered him to produce an album of sacred music, both traditional and contemporary, in Abbey Road Studios.

To record the album, Friar Alessandro had to take a plane to London. This was the first time he traveled by air. In accordance with his religious vows, he does not travel far or accept monetary compensation to promote his album. He instead donates his share of proceeds to the Order of Friars Minor, his Roman Catholic religious community around the world.

== Discography ==
=== Albums ===
Year	Album	Charts	Certification	Notes
Year	Album	FR	Certification	Notes
2012	Voice from Assisi (international): La voce da Assisi (Italy); La Voix d'Assise (France)	47		Track list: 1. "Fratello Sole Sorella Luna" (3:42); 2. "Pater Noster" (3:09); 3. "Le Lodi Di Dio Altissimo" (3:31); 4. "Panis Angelicus" (3:26); 5. "Sancta Maria" (5:20); 6. "Tantum Ergo Sacramentum" (4:02); 7. "Vergin Tutto Amor" (3:10); 8. "Ave Maria" (4:26); 9. "Kyrie" (3:49); 10. "Cantique de Jean Racine" (4:49); 11. "Make Me a Channel of Your Peace" (4:33)
2013	Voice of Joy (international): Chanter La Joie (France)	149		Track list: 1. "Tu Scendi Dalle Stelle"; 2. "O Santa Notte (O Holy Night)"; 3. "Adeste Fideles"; 4. "Veni, veni Emmanuel"; 5. "Agnus Dei"; 6. "O Tannenbaum"; 7. "Ave Maria; Bartolucci"; 8. "Madonna De La Claritate"; 9. "Joy to the World"; 10. "Alto E Glorioso Dio"; 11. "Ave Maria; Bach, Gounod"; 12. "Silent Night"; 13. "Caro Gesu Bambino"; 14. "Madre En La Puerta"; 15. "A Gaelic Blessing"
2015	Voice of Peace			Track list: 1. "Amazing Grace"; 2. "Resta Con Noi, Signore, La Sera"; 3. "Agnus Dei"; 4. "Con Te, Gesù"; 5. "Ave Maria; Vavilov"; 6. "Aria Da Chiesa"; 7. "Jesus bleibet meine Freude"; 8. "Ave Maria; Saint-Saëns"; 9. "Adagio"; 10. "Santo Francesco"; 11. "Ave Maria; Bach, Gounod"; 12. "Here I Am, Lord"

=== Singles ===
- 2012: "Panis Angelicus" / "Sancta Maria"
