= III (Hillsong Young & Free album) =

2018 studio album

Studio album by Hillsong Young & Free
- Released: 29 June 2018
- Studios: The Grove Studios, Somersby, Australia; Studios 301, Sydney, Australia; Golddust Studios, Sydney, Australia; Baxter House III Studios, Sydney, Australia; Henson Recording Studios, Hollywood, United States
- Genre: Worship, Christian pop, Christian EDM
- Length: 69:41
- Labels: Sparrow, Hillsong Music, Capitol CMG
- Producers: Aodhán King; Ben Tan; Michael Fatkin; Michael Guy Chislett; Joel Houston (exec.); Laura Toggs (exec.)

Hillsong Young & Free chronology
| Youth Revival Acoustic (2017) | III (2018) | III (Live at Hillsong Conference) (2018) |

Singles from III
- 1. "Love Won't Let Me Down" Released: 4 August 2017; 2. "P E A C E" Released: 22 February 2018; 3. "Let Go" Released: 18 May 2018; 4. "Just Jesus" Released: 8 June 2018

III (Three) is the second and final studio album from Hillsong Young & Free released on 29 June 2018. Four singles were released from the album, "Love Won't Let Me Down" on 4 August 2017 "P E A C E" on 22 February 2018 "Let Go" on 18 May 2018, and "Just Jesus" on 8 June 2018. Hillsong Young and Free released a live recording of the album from Hillsong Conference 2018, III (Live at Hillsong Conference); an acoustic version of the album on 5 April 2019, III (Studio Sessions); and a remixed version of the album on 5 September 2019, III (Reimagined).

== Background ==
"Love Won't Let Me Down" was released as the first single on 4 August 2017. The Love Won't Let Me Down EP was released on 16 February 2018 while "P E A C E" was released as a single on 22 February 2018 with the background story uploaded to the band's YouTube channel on 27 February 2018 followed by a studio performance of the song on 17 March 2018 and a "message and meaning of P E A C E" on 21 March 2018. On 18 May 2018 they released "Let Go" as their third single. They released "Just Jesus" as their fourth single on 8 June 2018.

Executive producer and featured worship leader Laura Toggs stated that the goal of the project was to have "a collection of personal songs, written and sung from profound devotions and life wrestles over the last three years" where, as a group they were "discovering greater depths and devoting ourselves completely to our faith in Jesus." Producer and featured worship leader-songwriter Aodhán King added that it was an attempt to reflect their members' growth in faith.

== Track listing ==
| No. | Title | Writer(s) | Worship leader(s) | Length |
|---|---|---|---|---|
| 1. | "Let Go" | Aodhán King; Ben Tan; Laura Toggs | Aodhan King; Karina Wykes | 3:51 |
| 2. | "Every Little Thing" | Bede Benjamin-Korporaal; Michael Fatkin; Aodhan King; Ben Tan | Karina Wykes | 3:23 |
| 3. | "Just Jesus" | Michael Fatkin; Benjamin Hastings | Laura Toggs | 3:35 |
| 4. | "First Love" | Benjamin Hastings; Aodhan King; Ben Tan | Renee Sieff | 5:18 |
| 5. | "Heart of God" | Aodhan King; Jonas Myrin | Aodhan King | 5:43 |
| 6. | "SELAH I" | Aodhan King; Jonas Myrin | Aodhan King | 2:31 |
| 7. | "Jesus Loves Me" | Aodhan King; Benjamin Hastings; Marty Sampson | Laura Toggs | 4:41 |
| 8. | "SELAH II" | | | 2:31 |
| 9. | "Days Gone By" | Ben Tan; Karina Wykes | Karina Wykes | 3:49 |
| 10. | "How Deep Is the Love" | Aodhan King; Michael Fatkin | Aodhan King; Melodie Wagner | 5:25 |
| 11. | "Push/Pull" | Aodhan King; Ben Tan; Tracy Pratt; Brooke Ligertwood | Tracy Pratt; Alexander Epa Iosefa; Brooke Ligertwood | 5:46 |
| 12. | "Love Won't Let Me Down" | Michael Fatkin; Alexander Pappas | Alexander Pappas | 3:27 |
| 13. | "More of You" | Alexander Pappas; Michael Fatkin; Melodie Wagner-Mäkinen | Melodie Wagner | 3:37 |
| 14. | "Hindsight" | Michael Fatkin; Benjamin Hastings; Aodhan King; Alexander Pappas | Alexander Pappas | 3:39 |
| 15. | "P E A C E" | Benjamin Hastings; Melodie Wagner; Michael Fatkin | Melodie Wagner | 3:58 |
| 16. | "SELAH III (Fruits of the Spirit)" | Michael Fatkin; Benjamin Hastings; Aodhan King; Alexander Pappas; Robbie Hellberg | Aodhan King; Laura Toggs; Alexander Epa Iosefa | 3:18 |
| 17. | "Highs & Lows" | Aodhan King; Ben Tan; Joel Houston | Aodhan King | 5:55 |
| Total length: | | | | 69:41 |

== Live recording ==
III (Live at Hillsong Conference)

Live album by Hillsong Young & Free
- Released: 2 November 2018
- Venues: Qudos Bank Arena, Sydney
- Genre: Worship, Christian pop, Christian EDM
- Length: 72:48
- Labels: Sparrow, Hillsong Music, Capitol CMG

Hillsong Young & Free chronology
| III (2018) | III (Live at Hillsong Conference) (2018) | III (Studio Sessions) (2019) |

On 2 November 2018, a live recording of the album was released. The album was recorded at Hillsong Conference, Sydney on 12 July 2018. A film recording of all 16 songs was released at the same time on YouTube, Apple Music and Hillsong Channel Now.

=== Track listing ===
| No. | Title | Worship leader(s) | Length |
|---|---|---|---|
| 1. | "SELAH III (Fruits of the Spirit) - Live" | Laura Toggs; Alexander Epa Iosefa | 3:01 |
| 2. | "Let Go - Live" | Aodhan King; Karina Wykes | 5:12 |
| 3. | "Wake - Live" | Renee Sieff | 4:17 |
| 4. | "Hindsight - Live" | Alexander Pappas | 3:58 |
| 5. | "Every Little Thing - Live" | Karina Wykes | 3:33 |
| 6. | "Jesus Loves Me - Live" | Laura Toggs | 5:17 |
| 7. | "Highs & Lows - Live" | Aodhan King | 6:20 |
| 8. | "P E A C E - Live" | Melodie Wagner | 6:38 |
| 9. | "Days Gone By - Live" | Karina Wykes | 3:50 |
| 10. | "Push/Pull - Live" | Alexander Epa Iosefa; Brooke Ligertwood | 5:08 |
| 11. | "How Deep Is the Love - Live" | Melodie Wagner; Alexander Epa Iosefa | 1:35 |
| 12. | "Sinking Deep - Live" | Aodhan King | 4:05 |
| 13. | "First Love - Live" | Renee Sieff | 5:25 |
| 14. | "Heart of God - Live" (featuring Chris Tomlin) | Aodhan King; Chris Tomlin | 7:17 |
| 15. | "Just Jesus - Live" | Laura Toggs | 3:34 |
| 16. | "Love Won't Let Me Down - Live" | Alexander Pappas | 3:38 |
| Total length: | | | 72:48 |

== Studio Sessions ==
III (Studio Sessions)

Studio album by Hillsong Young & Free
- Released: 5 April 2019
- Genre: Contemporary worship music
- Length: 42:42
- Labels: Hillsong Music, Capitol CMG

Hillsong Young & Free chronology
| III (Live at Hillsong Conference) (2018) | III (Studio Sessions) (2019) | III (Reimagined) (2019) |

On 5 April 2019, an acoustic recording of nine songs from the III album was released via Hillsong Music Australia and Capitol CMG.

=== Track listing ===
| No. | Title | Worship leader(s) | Length |
|---|---|---|---|
| 1. | "Let Go - Acoustic" | Aodhan King; Karina Wykes | 4:07 |
| 2. | "Every Little Thing - Acoustic" | Aodhan King | 3:23 |
| 3. | "Jesus Loves Me - Acoustic" | Laura Toggs | 4:11 |
| 4. | "Highs & Lows - Acoustic" | Aodhan King | 5:51 |
| 5. | "P E A C E - Acoustic" | Melodie Wagner | 4:23 |
| 6. | "Days Gone By - Acoustic" | Karina Wykes | 4:01 |
| 7. | "How Deep is the Love - Acoustic" | Aodhan King; Melodie Wagner | 5:29 |
| 8. | "First Love - Acoustic" | Renee Sieff | 4:39 |
| 9. | "Heart of God - Acoustic" | Aodhan King | 6:32 |
| Total length: | | | 42:42 |

== Reimagined ==
III (Reimagined)

Studio album by Hillsong Young & Free
- Released: 5 September 2019
- Genre: Contemporary worship music
- Length: 36:14
- Labels: Hillsong Music, Capitol CMG

Hillsong Young & Free chronology
| III (Studio Sessions) (2019) | III (Reimagined) (2019) |

Singles from III (Reimagined)
- 1. "Every Little Thing" Released: 24 May 2019

On 5 September 2019, a reimagined version of eleven songs from the III album was released via Hillsong Music Australia and Capitol CMG.

=== Track listing ===
| No. | Title | Length |
|---|---|---|
| 1. | "First Love - Reimagined" | 2:54 |
| 2. | "Just Jesus - Lark Remix" | 3:53 |
| 3. | "Heart of God - Eric Owyoung Remix" | 4:44 |
| 4. | "Let Go - Stripped Back" | 3:16 |
| 5. | "Every Little Thing - Reimagined" | 3:23 |
| 6. | "Days Gone By - Reimagined" | 2:54 |
| 7. | "P E A C E - Lark Remix" | 4:25 |
| 8. | "How Deep Is The Love - Reimagined" | 2:54 |
| 9. | "Good Grace - Reimagined" | 3:13 |
| 10. | "Let Go - Reimagined" | 3:16 |
| 11. | "Every Little Thing" (featuring Andy Mineo) | 3:22 |
| Total length: | | 36:14 |

== Charts ==
Studio album

| Chart (2018) | Peak position |
|---|---|
| Australian Albums (ARIA) | 12 |
| Dutch Albums (Album Top 100) | 166 |
| US Billboard 200 | 131 |
| US Top Christian Albums (Billboard) | 2 |

Live album

| Chart (2018) | Peak position |
|---|---|
| Australian Digital Albums (ARIA) | 50 |
| US Top Christian Albums (Billboard) | 40 |

== Accolades ==
The video for "Love Won't Let Me Down", from III, was nominated for a 2018 GMA Dove Award in the Short Form Video of the Year category.
