= This Is Living EP =

EP by Hillsong Young & Free
- Released: 13 January 2015
- Genres: Praise and worship; Christian pop Christian EDM
- Length: 22:53
- Labels: Hillsong; Capitol; Sparrow

Hillsong Young & Free EP chronology
This Is Living EP (2015)	We Are Young & Free: The Remixes EP (2015)

Singles from This Is Living EP
- 1. "This Is Living (featuring Lecrae)"

This Is Living EP is the first EP from Hillsong Young & Free. Capitol CMG and Sparrow Records alongside Hillsong Music Australia released the EP on 13 January 2015.

== Critical reception ==
Professional ratings
Review scores
Source	Rating
365 Days Of Inspiring Media	3.5/5 stars
AllMusic	3.5/5 stars
Band Hangout	4.5/5 stars
Cross Rhythms	7/10 squares
Geeks Under Grace	9/10
Louder Than The Music	4/5 stars
NewReleaseToday	4.5/5 stars
Worship Leader	4.5/5 stars

Upon release, This Is Living EP received generally positive reception, with critics highlighting the EP's high energy, dance-pop approach to conventional worship music. Signifying in a three-and-a-half-star review for 365 Days Of Inspiring Media, Jonathan Andre cited that the EP is "one deserving to be listened to" and that is "A must for anyone who loves EDM and worship,". David Jeffries of AllMusic, affixing a three and a half star rating to the EP, says that the first three songs "aim for the club with drum machine beats and bright synthesizer lines fueling the music," describes the acoustic version of "This Is Living" as settling "into afternoon material" and calls "Sinking Deep" an "empowering ballad". David Hitchcock, allotting the EP a four and a half star rating at Band Hangout, says, "All in all, the songs chosen make for a great and interesting EP" and that "Y&F has definitely pushed the boundaries of what has been considered "worship" music. Most of their "payoff" moments musically are instrumental breaks. Their melodies and lyrics push the limits of "congregational"." Cross Rhythms Lins Honeyman scored the EP seven-out-of-nine blocks, noting "there is a delightful '80s retro feel to proceedings which provides a refreshing alternative to the Coldplay-style worship sound that many praise outfits have adopted over recent years".

Giving the EP a nine out of ten rating on Geeks Under Grace, David Austin Black describes the EP as being "bright and God-centered, rejoicing in the freedom that life in Christ gives us and pausing to voice quiet, impassioned cries of the heart." Indicating in a four star review at Louder Than The Music, Jono Davies lists "This Is Living" and "Energy" as the standout tracks and states: "This isn't just an EP for young people, this is a fresh musical movement for anybody to get involved with. Musical styles and sounds are not ageist. Yet this EP has a youthful, even playfulness to it, but deep down right in the middle of the big dance sound is a heart to live for God. A joyful living for God and for me that's what I got most out of this EP." Caitlin Lassiter of NewReleaseToday bestowed the EP a four and a half star rating, noting that "After only minutes of listening to the music they've poured their heart into, it's clear that they're passionate about Christ and making His name known through worship. This Is Living is a perfect representation of that passion, exuding praise and joy from every single lyric." Jeremy Armstrong of Worship Leader rated the EP four stars, stating that Hillsong Young & Free "describes themselves as “young people who are passionate about bringing the message of Jesus, and the spirit of freedom that comes only from knowing him.” Their music certainly matches that description! Youthful, high energy, and fun. Perfectly suited for youth and young-adult settings."

== Track listing ==
This Is Living EP
No.	Title	Writer(s)	Length
1.	"This Is Living" (featuring Lecrae)	Aodhan King, Joel Davies, Lecrae Moore	3:30
2.	"Energy"	Melodie Wagner, Michael Fatkin	3:49
3.	"Pursue"	King, Hannah Hobbs	7:03
4.	"This Is Living" (Acoustic)	King, Davies	4:24
5.	"Sinking Deep"	Davies, King	4:07
Total length:			22:53

== Charts ==
Chart (2015)	Peak position
US Billboard 200 (Billboard)	35
US Christian Albums (Billboard)	1
