= Hillsong Young & Free =

Australian worship music group

- Also known as: Hillsong Y&F, Young & Free, Y&F
- Origin: Sydney, New South Wales, Australia
- Genres: Contemporary worship music; Christian pop; Christian EDM; electropop; dance-pop; Eurodance
- Years active: 2012–2022
- Labels: Sparrow, Hillsong, Capitol CMG
- Past members: Alexander Epa Iosefa; Taya Gaukrodger; Joshua Grimmett; Jack McGrath; Munashe Mutambiranwa; Alexander Pappas; Saye Pratt; Mi-Kaisha Rose; Renee Sieff; Ben Tan; Brendan Tan; Laura Toggs; Karina Savage; Jose Isai Valdez; Melodie Wagner-Mäkinen; Aodhán King; Josh Kpozehouen Tyler Douglass; Tom Furby; Aaron Hollinger; Hannan Suganarajan; Isaac Fisher; Tahisha Hunt; Harry Parnwell; Jacob Kami; Dani Marchio
- Website: hillsong.com/youngandfree

Hillsong Young & Free (also known as Hillsong Y&F or simply Young & Free or Y&F) was an Australian contemporary worship music and Christian EDM group from Sydney, Australia, where they started making Christian music in 2012 at Hillsong Church. The group was started by Hillsong pastors Peter Toganivalu and his wife Laura Toggs, with the latter being the daughter of Hillsong founder Brian Houston. The couple departed Hillsong in 2023, rendering the group inactive.

They have released four live albums: We Are Young & Free (2013), Youth Revival (2016), III Live (2018), and All of My Best Friends (2020); they have also released four studio albums: Youth Revival Acoustic (2017), III (2018), III (Studio Sessions) (2019), and III (Reimagined) (2019). Additionally, the group have released three EPs: This Is Living (2015), We Are Young & Free (The Remixes) - EP (2015), and Out Here on a Friday Where It Began (2021).

== Background ==
The group formed in 2012 out of Sydney, Australia, where they were located at Hillsong Church. Their members are worship leaders Aodhán King, Alexander Pappas, Tyler Douglass, Renee Sieff, Ben Tan, and Melodie Wagner. Hillsong United (launched in 1998), the original group, began when the members were all relatively young, since it was started as part of the youth ministry at Hillsong Church. As they started to mature, have families of their own, and take on adulthood, many people at the church felt there was a need for a new group that would aim its message at younger people with a stimulating new sound.

== History ==
Hillsong Young & Free released their first live album, We Are Young & Free, on 1 October 2013. The album debuted and peaked at No. 6 on the ARIA Albums Chart in Australia, also charting on several Billboard charts in the United States, peaking at No. 22 on the Billboard 200 and No. 1 on the Christian Albums chart. Their subsequent release, an extended play, This Is Living, was released on 11 January 2015. The release charted on the Billboard 200 at No. 38 and No. 1 on the Christian Albums chart. Their second extended play, The Remixes, was released on 4 December 2015. Their second live album, Youth Revival, was released on 26 February 2016. On 6 December 2016, it was announced that Hillsong Young & Free was nominated for a Grammy Award in the Best Contemporary Christian Music Album category for Youth Revival. Hillsong Young & Free featured on the track "Marching On" from Rend Collective's album Good News, which was released on 19 January 2018. In 2020, Young & Free's album All of My Best Friends was nominated for the 63rd Grammy Award in the Best Contemporary Christian Music Album category.

In May 2023, founding pastors Peter Toganivalu and Laura Toggs departed Hillsong following several controversies and the departure of Toggs' father and senior pastor Brian Houston, putting the group's future in question. Founding member Aodhan King also revealed he was no longer part of Young & Free in May 2025.

== Discography ==
=== Albums ===
List of albums, with selected chart positions
Title	Album details	Peak chart positions							
Title	Album details	AUS	BEL	DUT	NZ	NOR	US	US Christ.	UK C&G
We Are Young & Free	Released: 1 October 2013; Label: Sparrow, Hillsong Music, Capitol CMG; Formats: CD, download, streamed audio	6	174	46	14	10	22	1	—
Youth Revival	Released: 26 February 2016; Label: Sparrow, Hillsong Music, Capitol CMG; Formats: CD, download, streamed audio	3	125	64	14	28	45	2	1
III	Released: 29 June 2018; Label: Sparrow, Hillsong Music, Capitol CMG; Formats: CD, download, streamed audio, vinyl	12	166	—	—	—	131	2	1
All of My Best Friends	Released: 28 August 2020; Label: Sparrow, Hillsong Music, Capitol CMG; Formats: CD, Download, streamed audio, vinyl	—	—	—	—	—	—	14	—

=== Album versions ===
List of albums, with selected chart positions
Title	Album details	Peak chart positions		
Title	Album details	AUS	US Christ.	UK C&G
Youth Revival Acoustic	Released: 24 February 2017; Label: Sparrow, Hillsong Music, Capitol CMG; Formats: CD, download, streamed audio	37	24	10
III (Live at Hillsong Conference)	Released: 2 November 2018; Label: Sparrow, Hillsong Music, Capitol CMG; Formats: CD, download, streamed audio	50	40	—
III (Studio Sessions)	Released: 5 April 2019; Label: Sparrow, Hillsong Music, Capitol CMG; Formats: CD, download, streamed audio	—	—	—
III (Reimagined)	Released: 6 September 2019; Label: Sparrow, Hillsong Music, Capitol CMG; Formats: Download, streamed audio	—	—	—
Todos Mis Mejores Amigos	Released: 15 January 2021; Label: Sparrow, Hillsong Music, Capitol CMG; Formats: CD, Download, streamed audio	—	—	—
All Of My Best Friends (Acoustic)	Released: 12 February 2021; Label: Sparrow, Hillsong Music, Capitol CMG; Formats: CD, Download, streamed audio	—	—	—

=== EPs ===
List of EPs, with selected chart positions
Title	EP details	Peak chart positions		
Title	EP details	AUS	US	US Christ
This Is Living	Released: 13 January 2015; Label: Sparrow, Hillsong Music, Capitol CMG; Formats: CD, download, streamed audio	—	38	1
We Are Young & Free: The Remixes EP	Released: 4 December 2015; Label: Sparrow, Hillsong Music, Capitol CMG; Formats: CD, download, streamed audio	83	—	31
Todos Mis Mejores Amigos	Released: 18 September 2020; Label: Sparrow, Hillsong Music, Capitol CMG; Formats: CD, download, streamed audio	—	—	—
Wish We Were All Together...but until then	Released: 20 November 2020; Label: Sparrow, Hillsong Music, Capitol CMG; Format: streamed audio	—	—	—
Out Here On a Friday Where It Began	Released: 30 July 2021; Label: Sparrow, Hillsong Music, Capitol CMG; Formats: Download, streamed audio	—	—	—

=== Singles ===
Year	Title	Peak chart positions							Album
Year	Title	AUS	AUS Christ.	NZ Hot	US Christ.	US Christ. Air.	US Christ. Digital	UK Cross	Album
2013	"Alive"	50	1	—	19	20	5	2	We Are Young & Free
2013	"Wake"	—	6	—	22	30	2	—	We Are Young & Free
2014	"The Stand"	—	—	—	—	—	—	—	non-album singles
2015	"Noel"	—	—	—	40	32	23	—	non-album singles
2015	"This Is Living" (featuring Lecrae)	61	1	—	16	29	9	1	This Is Living (EP)
2015	"Where You Are"	—	1	—	16	25	17	—	Youth Revival
2016	"Real Love"	—	1	—	27	35	44	—	Youth Revival
2016	"Falling Into You"	—	1	—	29	23	—	—	Youth Revival
2017	"Love Won't Let Me Down"	—	1	—	22	30	11	—	III (Three)
2018	"P E A C E"	—	15	—	20	—	8	—	III (Three)
2018	"Let Go"	—	1	—	23	31	23	3	III (Three)
2018	"Just Jesus"	—	—	—	37	—	—	—	III (Three)
2019	"Heart of God"	—	—	—	46	39	—	—	III (Three)
2019	"Every Little Thing" (featuring Andy Mineo)	—	1	—	—	48	—	6	III (Reimagined)
2020	"Best Friends"	—	1	30	26	50	20	8	All of My Best Friends
2020	"Never Have I Ever"	—	1	—	36	42	—	2	All of My Best Friends
2020	"World Outside Your Window"	—	—	—	—	43	—	—	All of My Best Friends
2020	"Uncomplicated"	—	—	—	41	—	—	—	All of My Best Friends
2020	"Indescribable"	—	1	—	—	—	—	—	All of My Best Friends
2020	"As I Am"	—	—	—	—	—	—	—	All of My Best Friends
2021	"Phenomena (DA DA)"	—	1	—	46	—	—	—	Out Here On a Friday Where It Began (EP)

=== Other charted songs ===
Year	Title	Peak chart positions			Album
Year	Title	US Christ.	US Christ. Digital	UK Cross	Album
2013	"Back to Life"	—	38	—	We Are Young & Free
2015	"Sinking Deep"	28	44	2	This Is Living (EP)
2015	"Energy"	35	—	—	This Is Living (EP)
2015	"Pursue"	34	—	—	This Is Living (EP)
2016	"To My Knees"	37	—	—	Youth Revival
2018	"First Love"	48	—	6	III (Three)
2020	“Lord Send Revival”	49	—	—	All of My Best Friends

=== Featured songs ===
- "Relentless (Young & Free Remix)" (2014) / Hillsong UNITED – The White Album
- "Alive" (2014) / Hillsong Worship – No Other Name (only DVD)
- "Sinking Deep" (2014) / Hillsong Worship – No Other Name (only DVD)
- "This Is Living" (2015) / Hillsong Worship – Open Heaven / River Wild (digital deluxe edition and DVD)
- "Pursue/All I Need Is You" (2015) / Hillsong Worship – Open Heaven / River Wild (digital deluxe edition and DVD)
- "Marching On (featuring Hillsong Young & Free)" (2018) / Rend Collective – Good News

=== Music videos ===
- "Alive" (2013)
- "Wake" (2013)
- "Back to Life" (2013)
- "Gracious Tempest" (special performance) (2014)
- "This Is Living" (2015)
- "Where You Are" (2016)
- "Real Love" (2016)
- "Falling Into You" (2016)
- "Love Won't Let Me Down" (2017)
- "P E A C E" (2018)
- "Let Go" (2018)
