= The Peace Project (album) =

2017 studio album by Hillsong Worship

Studio album by Hillsong Worship
- Released: 20 October 2017
- Recorded: 2017
- Studio: Record Plant (Hollywood, California); EastWest (Hollywood, California); SmoakStack (Nashville, Tennessee); Baxter House (Sydney, Australia); Linear Recording (Sydney, Australia); Avatar (New York, New York); The Base Recording Studios (South Melbourne, Australia) (strings and horns); Oaklands Productions (Nunawading, Australia); The Hub (Sydney, Australia); GoldDust (Sydney, Australia)
- Genre: Contemporary worship music; Christmas
- Length: 57:17
- Label: Hillsong Music; Capitol CMG
- Producer: Ben Tan; Michael Guy Chislett

Hillsong Music Christmas series chronology
We Have a Saviour (2012)	The Peace Project (2017)

Hillsong Worship chronology
Let There Be Light (2016)	The Peace Project (2017)	There Is More (2018)

Singles from The Peace Project
- 1. "Seasons" Released: 2017

The Peace Project (also known as Christmas: The Peace Project) is an album by Australian contemporary worship group Hillsong Worship and is the fifth Christmas-themed worship album from Hillsong Music, following We Have a Saviour (2012). Released on 20 October 2017 by Hillsong Music Australia and Capitol Christian Music Group, the album's production was spearheaded by Ben Tan and Michael Guy Chislett. The album was nominated for the GMA Dove Award for Christmas / Special Event Album of the Year at the 49th Annual GMA Dove Awards.

== Commercial performance ==
In the United Kingdom, The Peace Project debuted at No. 4 on the Official Christian & Gospel Albums Chart dated 2 November 2017. It took the album seven weeks to reach No. 1, having registered at the top spot on the chart dated 14 December.

In the United States, The Peace Project debuted on the Billboard Christian Albums chart dated 11 November 2017, at No. 26. After two years and eight months since its release, the album made its debut at No. 122 on the all-genre Billboard 200 chart dated 29 June 2019, whilst peaking at No. 2 on the Christian Albums chart.

== Track listing ==
The Peace Project
No.	Title	Writer(s)	Worship leader(s)	Length
1.	"Joy to the World"	Isaac Watts; George Frideric Handel; Lowell Mason	Aodhan King	3:45
2.	"Hark"	Charles Wesley; Felix Mendelssohn-Bartholdy; William H. Cummings	Taya Smith	5:03
3.	"Seasons"	Chris Davenport; Ben Tan; Benjamin Hastings	Benjamin Hastings	4:34
4.	"Prince of Heaven"	Scott Ligertwood; Brooke Ligertwood	Brooke Ligertwood; Matt Crocker	6:12
5.	"O Come All Ye Faithful"	John Francis Wade; Frederick Oakeley	Karina Wykes	4:18
6.	"Noel"	William Sandys; Davies Gilbert; John Stainer; Davenport; Benjamin Hastings	Michelle Cook	4:01
7.	"When I Think Upon Christmas"	Aodhan King; Tan; Renee Sieff	Renee Sieff	3:56
8.	"Silent Night (with Saviour King)"	Joseph Mohr; Franz Xaver Gruber; Marty Sampson; Mia Fieldes	Kris Hodge; Laura Toggs; Gloria Mati-Leifi	7:06
9.	"Arrival"	Michael Guy Chislett; Hastings; Dylan Thomas	Matt Crocker	7:21
10.	"Theme of the Eastern Star"	Jared Haschek		1:09
11.	"O Holy Night"	Placide Cappeau; Adolphe Adam; John Sullivan Dwight	Taya Smith	5:34
12.	"Peace Upon the Earth"	Frédéric Chopin; Sampson	Marty Sampson	4:10
Total length:				57:17

== Christmas: The Peace Project (Deluxe) ==
Christmas: The Peace Project (Deluxe)

Studio album by Hillsong Worship
- Released: 26 October 2018
- Genre: Contemporary worship music; Christmas
- Length: 120:24
- Label: Hillsong Music; Capitol CMG

Hillsong Worship chronology
There Is More (2018)	Christmas: The Peace Project (Deluxe) (2018)

On 26 October 2018, Hillsong Worship released a deluxe version of the album titled Christmas: The Peace Project (Deluxe), via Hillsong Music Australia and Capitol Christian Music Group in digital format.

The Peace Project — Deluxe version
No.	Title	Length
1.	"Joy to the World"	3:45
2.	"Hark"	5:03
3.	"Seasons"	4:34
4.	"Prince of Heaven"	6:12
5.	"O Come All Ye Faithful"	4:18
6.	"Noel"	4:01
7.	"When I Think Upon Christmas"	3:58
8.	"Silent Night (With Saviour King)"	7:06
9.	"Arrival"	7:21
10.	"Theme of the Eastern Star"	1:09
11.	"O Holy Night"	5:34
12.	"Peace Upon the Earth"	4:10
13.	"O Holy Night" (Live)	5:28
14.	"Silent Night (With Saviour King)" (Live)	7:12
15.	"Prince of Heaven" (Reimagined)	5:33
16.	"Joy to the World" (Reimagined)	3:36
17.	"Joy to the World" (Instrumental)	3:47
18.	"Hark" (Instrumental)	5:04
19.	"Seasons" (Instrumental)	4:36
20.	"Prince of Heaven" (Instrumental)	6:08
21.	"O Come All Ye Faithful" (Instrumental)	4:23
22.	"Noel" (Instrumental)	4:01
23.	"When I Think Upon Christmas" (Instrumental)	3:56
24.	"Silent Night (With Saviour King)" (Instrumental)	7:09
25.	"Arrival" (Instrumental)	7:20
26.	"O Holy Night" (Instrumental)	5:35
27.	"Peace Upon the Earth" (Instrumental)	4:10
Total length:		120:24

== Personnel ==
Credits adapted from Tidal and Hillsong Zendesk

Vocals

- Taya Smith – lead vocals
- Brooke Ligertwood – lead vocals
- Aodhan King – lead vocals
- Benjamin Hastings – lead vocals
- Renee Sieff – lead vocals
- Michelle Cook – lead vocals, additional vocals
- Karina Wykes – lead vocals
- Marty Sampson – lead vocals
- Laura Toggs – lead vocals
- Matt Crocker – lead vocals
- Kris Hodge – lead vocals, additional vocals
- Melodie Wagner – additional vocals
- David Ware – additional vocals
- Dejsha Lollar – additional vocals
- John Davis – additional vocals
- Tanner Church – additional vocals
- Chelsea LaRosa – additional vocals
- Bella Taylor-Smith – additional vocals
- Dee Uluirewa – vocal coach

Technical, strings and horns

- Sam Gibson – mixing (tracks 1, 2, 3, 4, 6 and 7) (at Cardiff Creative Lab, UK)
- Ben Whincop – mixing (tracks 5, 8, 9, 10, 11 and 12) (at Sydney Australia), record engineer, bass
- Stephen Marcussen – mastering
- Stewart Whitmore – digital editing (at Marcussen Mastering, Hollywood, USA)
- Michael Guy Chislett – record engineer, electric guitar, acoustic guitar, programming
- Grant Konemann – record engineer, programming
- Ben Tan – record engineer, electric guitar, synthesizer, acoustic guitar, programming
- Chris Dennis – record engineer
- Phil Threlfall – record engineer (strings and horns)
- Oly Marian – assistant engineer
- Luke Klingensmith – assistant engineer
- Tyler Shields – assistant engineer
- Bo Bodnar – assistant engineer
- Jared Haschek – assistant engineer, string arrangements
- Michael Zuvella – additional engineering
- Omar Sierra – additional engineering
- Nate Balderston – additional engineering
- Rolf Wam Fjell – drums
- Daniel McMurray – drums, percussion
- Matt Tennikoff – bass
- Ben Tennikoff – piano, synthesizer, programming
- Dylan Thomas – piano, string arrangements, programming
- Daniel McMurray – piano
- Robbie Hellberg – piano, synthesizer
- Peter James – synthesizer
- Jack McGrath – synthesizer, programming
- Autumn Starra – synthesizer
- Freya Franzen – violin
- Zoe Friesberg – violin
- Imelda Yalcin – violin
- Harry Bennetts – violin
- Yena Choi – violin
- Lisa Reynolds – violin
- Lauren Brigden – viola
- Tom Higham – viola
- Ceridwen Davies – viola
- Will Clark – viola
- Liz Woolnough – viola
- Zoe Knighton – cello
- Tim Hennessy – cello
- Chloe Smith – double bass
- Josh Rogan – trumpets
- Henrik Beasy – trumpets
- Rob Shirley – French horn
- Rachel Shaw – French horn
- Saul Lewis – French horn
- Abbey Edlin – French horn
- Ian Bell – trombone
- Caleb Webb – trombone
- Megan Reeve – harp
- Simon Kobler – percussion, programming
- Brendan Tan – percussion, programming

Choir and ensemble

- Gloria Mati-Leifi – gospel ensemble
- Rachel Helms – gospel ensemble
- Dee Uluirewa – gospel ensemble
- Danniebelle Whippy – gospel ensemble
- Shekeinah Hill – gospel ensemble, choir coordinator
- Kris Hodge – gospel ensemble
- Taga Paa – gospel ensemble
- Rika Setu-Galo – gospel ensemble
- Jason Temu – gospel ensemble
- Lilly Saggin – children's choir
- Sienna Saggin – children's choir
- Harmony Saggin – children's choir
- Caleb Saggin – children's choir
- Mikayla McLean – children's choir
- Buddy McLean – children's choir
- Phoenix Andrew – children's choir
- Milla Andrew – children's choir
- Crosby Konemann – children's choir
- Elliott Guy Chislett – children's choir
- Alison Moore – children's choir coordinator
- Hillsong Choir – choir

Art & design

- Jay Argaet – art
- Nathan Cahyadi – art
- Nick Dellis – art
- Hillsong Communications – additional design

Admin

- Jill Casey – album administration
- Anthony Gomez – album administration
- Laura Kelly – album administration
- Alison Brown – album administration
- Steve Harmeling – album administration
- Chris Neal – album administration
- Josh Olson – album administration

Project handling and management

- Cassandra Langton – project direction
- Joel Houston – project direction
- Brooke Ligertwood – project direction
- Michael Guy Chislett – project direction
- Tim Whincop – project direction
- Steve McPherson – project direction
- Grant Thomson – project direction
- Jose Huergo – brand manager
- Matthew Capper – project manager
- Kris Hodge – assistant project manager

Production

- Ben Tan – producer
- Michael Guy Chislett – producer

Executive

- Brian Houston – global pastor (Hillsong Church)
- Bobbie Houston – global pastor (Hillsong Church)
- Cassandra Langton – global creative pastor (Hillsong Church)
- Rich Langton – global creative pastor (Hillsong Church)

== Charts ==
Chart (2017–19)	Peak position
Australian Albums (ARIA)	18
UK Christian & Gospel Albums (OCC)	1
US Billboard 200	122
US Top Christian Albums (Billboard)	2

== Release history ==
Region	Date	Format	Label	Ref.
Various	20 October 2017	CD; Digital download; streaming	Hillsong Music; Capitol Christian Music Group	
