= Youth Revival =

2016 live album by Hillsong Young & Free

Live album by Hillsong Young & Free
- Released: 26 February 2016
- Recorded: 13 November 2015
- Studio: Hillsong City Campus
- Genres: Praise and worship, Christian pop, Christian EDM
- Length: 59:01
- Labels: Sparrow, Hillsong Music, Capitol CMG

Hillsong Young & Free chronology
We Are Young & Free (2013)	Youth Revival (2016)	Youth Revival Acoustic (2017)

Singles from Youth Revival
- 1. "Where You Are" Released: 11 December 2015; 2. "Real Love" Released: 29 April 2016; 3. "Falling Into You" Released: 4 November 2016

Youth Revival is the second live album from Hillsong Young & Free. It was recorded live at Hillsong City Campus in Waterloo, Sydney on November 13, 2015. Sparrow Records alongside Hillsong Music Australia released the album on 26 February 2016. On 2 November 2016, along with their campaign "An Act of Real Love", the official music video of "Real Love" was released. It received a nomination for Best Contemporary Christian Music Album at the 59th Annual Grammy Awards.

== Critical reception ==
Professional ratings
Review scores
Source	Rating
CCM Magazine	3/5 stars
The Christian Beat	5/5 stars
CM Addict	4.5/5 stars
New Release Today	3.5/5 stars
Today's Christian Entertainment	3.5/5 stars
Worship Leader	5/5 stars

Matt Conner, allotting the album a three star rating from CCM Magazine, says, "Youth Revival is...a spirited live recording that captures the blips and bloops, pulses and praises of an impassioned worship gathering." Awarding the album five stars at Worship Leader, Jeremy Armstrong states, "This is a rare release that accomplishes exactly what it sets out to do: make a powerful impact with songs that clearly portray the truth of Christ in a musical and cultural language that resonates with the youth today." Mikayla Shriver, rating the album three and a half stars from New Release Today, writes, "Hillsong Young & Free's Youth Revival packages worship into modern, youth-friendly music, matching the popular style of today's music in its own unique way." Giving the album three and a half stars for Today's Christian Entertainment, Laura Chambers describes, "Youth Revival finally brings a Biblical perspective to the pop culture table, cleverly combining the style of the day with a relevant message of love and gratitude, the latter something that is sorely lacking in our relentless push to have the next thing." Chris Major, allocating the album five stars by The Christian Beat, says, "Youth Revival is a must listen for any fan of contemporary Christian music. Its ambition, its thankful atmosphere, and its joy are unmatched. The melodies and sounds are masterful and beautifully complement the massive wave of ecstatic praise. The unbounded and unrelenting energy surging through every track makes the urge to celebrate along difficult to resist." Indicating in a four and a half star review at CM Addict, Michael Tackett writes, "With this sophomore release, Hillsong Young & Free is an example of modern Christian music done right."

== Track listing ==
Standard edition
No.	Title	Writer(s)	Worship Leader	Length
1.	"Where You Are"	Michael Fatkin, Benjamin Hastings, Aodhán King, Alexander Pappas	Aodhan King	3:26
2.	"Real Love"	Fatkin, Hannah Hobbs, Pappas	Alexander Pappas	3:47
3.	"Only Wanna Sing"	Fatkin, King, Ben Tan	Aodhan King	3:15
4.	"Face to Face"	Fatkin, Hobbs, Laura Toggs	Laura Toggs	5:10
5.	"To My Knees"	Joel Davies, King	Aodhan King	7:53
6.	"Trust"	King, Tan, Melodie Wagner	Melodie Wagner, Tyler Douglass	4:50
7.	"Never Alone"	Tracy Pratt, Tan	Tracy Pratt	4:37
8.	"When the Fight Calls"	Fatkin, King, Scott Ligertwood, Wagner	Alexander Pappas	4:45
9.	"Falling into You"	Hastings, King, Pratt, Cameron Robertson, Tan	Melodie Wagner	3:07
10.	"This Is Living"	Davies, King	Aodhan King	3:33
11.	"In Your Eyes"	Hastings, Tan	Renee Sieff	3:33
12.	"Passion"	King, Bede Benjamin-Korporaal, Tan, Toggs	Aodhan King, Karina Wykes	7:38
13.	"Where You Are" (Radio Version)	Fatkin, Hastings, King, Pappas	Aodhan King	3:27
Total length:				59:01

DVD
No.	Title	Length
1.	"Created Youth"	2:32
2.	"This is Living"	3:29
3.	"Falling Into You"	3:08
4.	"Where You Are"	3:25
5.	"Face to Face"	5:05
6.	"Fallen Youth: The Fall"	1:48
7.	"Fallen Youth: Buzz"	0:52
8.	"To My Knees"	7:53
9.	"Trust"	4:52
10.	"When the Fight Calls"	4:30
11.	"In Your Eyes"	3:28
12.	"Never Alone"	4:37
13.	"Rescued Youth"	1:46
14.	"Passion"	7:40
15.	"Only Wanna Sing"	3:11
16.	"Authentic Youth"	1:07
17.	"Real Love"	4:21

== Youth Revival Acoustic ==
Youth Revival Acoustic

Studio album by Hillsong Young & Free
- Released: 24 February 2017
- Genre: Contemporary worship music
- Length: 40:07
- Labels: Sparrow, Hillsong Music, Capitol CMG

Hillsong Young & Free chronology
Youth Revival (2016)	Youth Revival Acoustic (2017)	III (2018)

On 24 February 2017, an acoustic recording of the Youth Revival album was released via Hillsong Music Australia.

=== Track listing ===
No.	Title	Worship leader(s)	Length
1.	"Falling Into You - Acoustic"	Melodie Wagner	3:42
2.	"Only Wanna Sing - Acoustic"	Aodhan King; Renee Sieff	3:51
3.	"When the Fight Calls - Acoustic"	Renee Sieff; Alexander Pappas	5:09
4.	"Never Alone - Acoustic"	Tracy Pratt	4:09
5.	"In Your Eyes - Acoustic"	Aodhan King; Lauren Vella	3:41
6.	"I Love You Lord / Passion - Acoustic"	Laura Toggs	5:27
7.	"Real Love - Acoustic"	Alexander Pappas; Renee Sieff	4:10
8.	"Where You Are - Acoustic"	Karina Wykes; Aodhan King	3:28
9.	"Real Love - Studio Version"	Alexander Pappas	3:47
10.	"Falling Into You - Studio Version"	Melodie Wagner	3:01
Total length:			40:07

== Charts ==
=== Weekly charts ===
Chart (2016)	Peak position
Australian Albums (ARIA)	3
Belgian Albums (Ultratop Wallonia)	125
Dutch Albums (Album Top 100)	64
New Zealand Albums (RMNZ)	14
Norwegian Albums (VG-lista)	28
US Billboard 200	45
US Top Christian Albums (Billboard)	2

=== Year-end charts ===
Chart (2016)	Position
Australian Albums (ARIA)	98
