= We Are Young & Free =

Live album by Hillsong Young & Free
- Released: 1 October 2013
- Recorded: 19 April 2013
- Genre: Contemporary Christian, electronic pop, CEDM, worship
- Length: 1:12:49 (digital version)
- Label: Sparrow, Hillsong Music, Capitol CMG
- Producer: Michael Guy Chislett, Joel Davies

Hillsong Young & Free chronology
| We Are Young & Free (2013) | Youth Revival (2016) |

Singles from We Are Young & Free
- 1. "Alive" Released: 16 July 2013; 2. "Wake" Released: 27 August 2013; 3. "Vivo Estás" Released: 15 September 2013; 4. "Back to Life" Released: 7 October 2013

We Are Young & Free is the first album in the Hillsong Young & Free series by Australian CCM Hillsong Music Australia.

The album was preceded by the releasing of two singles "Alive" and "Wake", and a Spanish single "Vivo Estás". The album was recorded live at the Hillsong Convention Centre on 19 April 2013.

== History ==
The album was announced in an official page of the band by a series of photos. On 22 March 2013, during the Colour Conference, the release date was set to be October later that year. On 10 April, the band started the publicity for the album recording night, by posting pictures about the event on Facebook, Twitter and other social networks.

== Track listing ==
Standard edition
| No. | Title | Writer(s) | Worship Leader | Length |
|---|---|---|---|---|
| 1. | "Brighter" | Aodhan King, Ben Tan, Melodie Wagner | Melodie Wagner | 3:34 |
| 2. | "Alive" | Aodhan King, Alexander Pappas | Alexander Pappas | 3:53 |
| 3. | "Wake" | Joel Davies, Hannah Hobbs, Alexander Pappas | Taya Smith | 4:35 |
| 4. | "Lifeline" | Michael Fatkin, Joel Houston, Renee Sieff, Melodie Wagner | Melodie Wagner | 5:06 |
| 5. | "Close" | Aodhan King, Dean Ussher | Aodhan King | 5:05 |
| 6. | "Love Goes On" | Joel Davies, Hannah Hobbs, Laura Toggs | Taya Smith | 4:59 |
| 7. | "Gracious Tempest" | Matt Crocker, Marty Sampson, Ben Tan | Ben Tan | 3:59 |
| 8. | "End of Days" | Bede Benjamin-Korporaal, Alexander Pappas | Alexander Pappas | 8:42 |
| 9. | "Back to Life" | Joel Davies, Aodhan King | Melodie Wagner | 4:17 |
| 10. | "In Sync" | Matt Crocker, Aodhan King, Ben Tan | Aodhan King | 3:16 |
| 11. | "Embers" | Hannah Hobbs, Ben Tan | Aodhan King | 5:52 |
| 12. | "Sinking Deep" | Joel Davies, Aodhan King | Aodhan King | 7:28 |
| 13. | "Alive" (studio version) | Aodhan King, Alexander Pappas | Alexander Pappas | 3:47 |
| 14. | "Wake" (studio version) | Joel Davies, Hannah Hobbs, Alexander Pappas | Taya Smith | 4:14 |
| 15. | "Back to Life" (studio version) | Joel Davies, Aodhan King | Melodie Wagner | 3:52 |
| Total length: | | | | 1:12:49 |

== Charts ==
| Chart (2013) | Peak position |
|---|---|
| Australian Albums (ARIA) | 6 |
| Belgian Albums (Ultratop Flanders) | 174 |
| Dutch Albums (Album Top 100) | 46 |
| New Zealand Albums (RMNZ) | 14 |
| Norwegian Albums (VG-lista) | 10 |
| UK Independent Albums Chart | 23 |
| US Billboard 200 | 22 |
| US Billboard Christian Albums | 1 |
| US Billboard Digital Albums | 6 |
