= Kilson =

Kilson is a surname. Notable people with the surname include:

- Kilson (footballer) (born 1983), São Toméan footballer
- Billy Kilson (born 1962), American jazz drummer
- Martin Kilson (1931–2019), American political scientist

== See also ==
- Hilson
- Pilson
- Wilson (name)
