= Geoff Bullock =

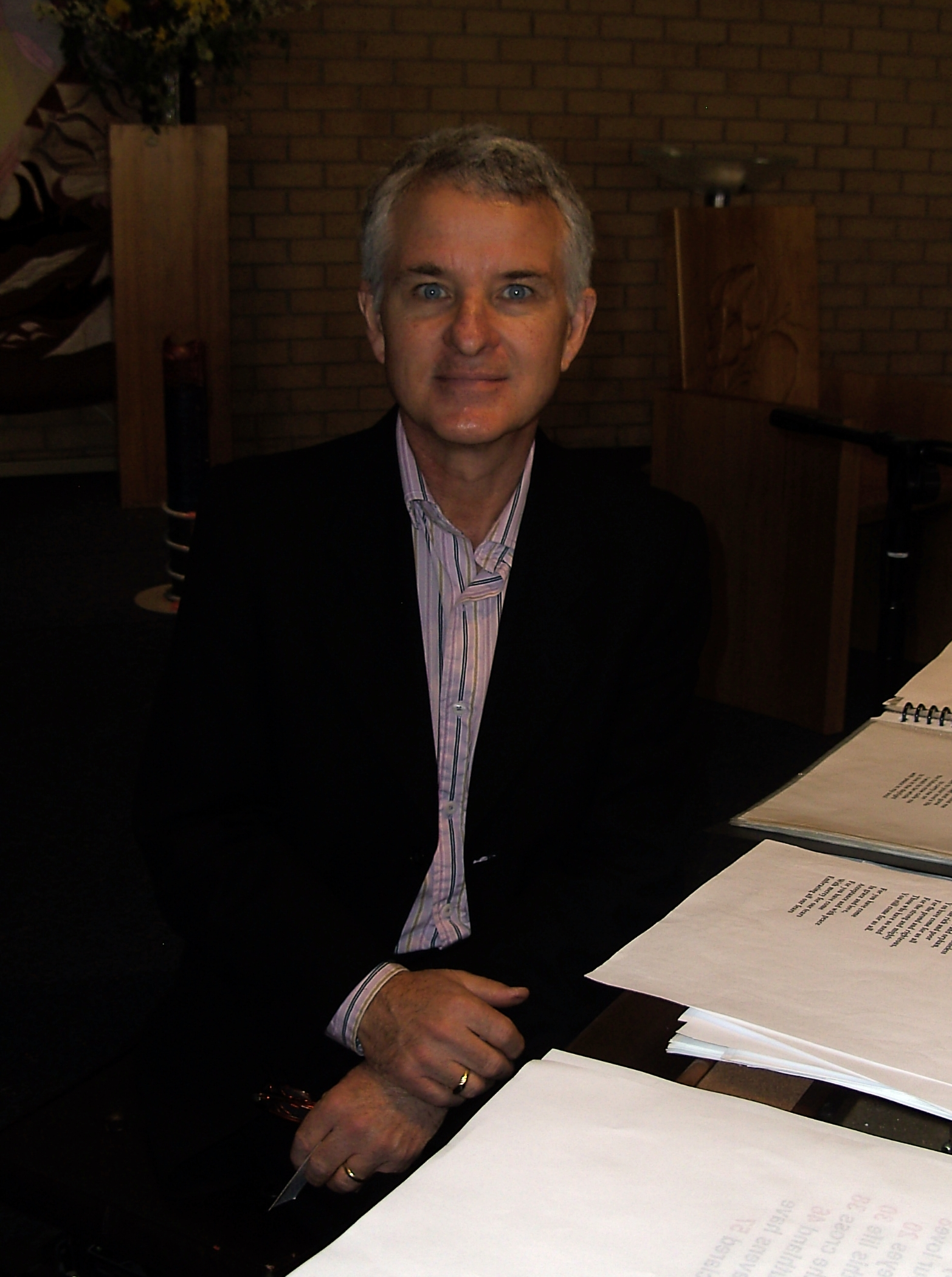
- Bullock at the piano, September 2009

Background information
- Born: Geoffrey William Bullock; 6 November 1955 (age 70); Sydney, New South Wales, Australia
- Genres: Worship, Christian
- Occupations: Cameraman, musician
- Instruments: Vocals, piano
- Years active: 1975–present
- Labels: Hillsong, Breedon Hill, Kingsway

Geoffrey William "Geoff" Bullock (born 6 November 1955) is an Australian singer-songwriter and pianist. He helped pioneer the Hills Christian Life Centre, which later became Hillsong Church. He was appointed as the church's worship pastor and was also the convenor of their annual conferences from 1987 to 1995, before leaving Hillsong in late 1995.

Bullock has recorded over 20 albums and written two books, Hands of Grace (1998) and The Power Of Your Love... Jesus The Unexpected God (2000).

== Early life and career ==
Geoffrey William Bullock was born on 6 November 1955 in Sydney. His father is Peter and his mother is Beth; and he grew up with a younger sister, Jane. Bullock was raised as a Presbyterian and attended Knox Grammar School from 1964 to 1972. He completed tertiary studies at North Sydney TAFE in 1976 for a Television Operator's Certificate II. From 1975 to 1984 he worked as a cameraman at ABC Television in Gore Hill, including work on The Marcia Hines Show, Farnham and Byrne (see John Farnham, Debra Byrne), Mastermind, Parkinson, The Norman Gunston Show and Play School as well as news and current affairs programs. During the early 1970s he played in "garage band after garage band" and by mid-decade was in a rock group, Arnhem, which toured the east coast of Australia.

In November 1978, at the age of 23, Bullock became a committed Christian. He said that "it was in that real charismatic, pentecostal awakening that was happening... I grew up with a bunch of teenagers and they started getting saved into what has become the Hillsong Church and eventually I went along and that was it." He was on the team, led by Brian Houston, that pioneered the Hills Christian Life Centre (later part of Hillsong Church) in August 1983. Aside from Bullock and Houston the initial pastors were Pat Mesiti, Mike Murphy, Donna Quinn and Michael Smith. Bullock was appointed the worship pastor for Hillsong Church in Sydney and was the convenor of their annual conferences from 1987 to 1995. Tanya Levin described him in her book People in Glass Houses: An insider's story of a life in and out of Hillsong (2007) writing that "[he] was our Piano Man. Short and stock, with blue eyes that pierced you like laser beams."

Bullock was a pastor at the Hillsong Conference in July 1995. He left Hillsong Church in October that year. In August 2004 he told David Adams and Lloyd Harkness of Sight magazine, "I burnt out, I suppose. At the time I was so convinced that God was asking me to leave and (now) I’m just not so sure... I just knew I had to go and I think, in a way, it was escaping a damaging spirituality that I'd allowed to happen. I don't want to blame those guys for it – it was my problem. Now I have become a very different person and so you can see that there was a divergence of style and theology and concept that came from it."

During Bullock's time at Hillsong Church, six albums were recorded and released by Hillsong Music for which he wrote many songs, including "The Power of Your Love", "Refresh My Heart" (both July 1992), "Have Faith in God", "You Rescued Me" (both July 1994), "I Will Never Be the Same Again" (1996) and "This Kingdom" (July 1995). He co-produced some of the albums with Russell Fragar and / or Darlene Zschech. He also wrote articles for various religious journals.

In 2006 Angelica Del Vasto of Worship Leader Magazine wrote about Bullock's song "The Power of Your Love" that it "encompasses the listener with... the empowering conviction that the Creator of the universe has done, and is doing, everything to convey His love to us. It compels us to face our own weaknesses and then fall into the arms of God." She noted that the "musical feel of the song [is due] to the use of minor chords to break up the major chords, a typical approach in his writing." Bullock acknowledged its influence on his later life, saying "so many of the songs that I had written [earlier] were given new meaning as I had to live out their inspiration. It is far easier writing a song than having to live out its words."

In January 1997 Bullock released the solo album You Rescued Me: The First Ten Years Anthology 1987-1997, a double CD album on the Breedon Hill Music label which collected his works written while a member of Hillsong. In 1998 he issued Hands of Grace – Face to Face Worship on the Kingsway label, of which Cross Rhythms' Trevor Kirk said that "[his] recent work has noticeably veered toward the middle of the road. This project goes further, and infringes on the ambient. Loads of swirling synths and elaborate (and lengthy) arrangements." Bullock also wrote his first book, Hands of grace: Jesus, God's symphony of hope, printed by Strand Publishing, in 1998. His album A Symphony of Hope was released on 21 May 1999, which was recorded with the Prague Philharmonic Orchestra and has Paul Terracini as conductor and arranger. It had been recorded in Prague on Good Friday and included two tracks written by Terracini.

In 2000 Bullock's second book, Power Of Your Love: Jesus: The Unexpected God, was published. It was followed in early 2001 by another album, Deeper and Deeper, of which Jennifer Brooker of Cross Rhythms said that it had a "broad rich sound, immaculately produced; some numbers are arranged for full symphony orchestra" although she also wrote that "Shame the songs aren't more memorable, anyone looking for another 'Power of Your Love' won't find it." In October 2008 Bullock reflected on his songs, saying that they are "about worship, but worship is an entirely different thing. It is a bit like love songs. Love songs aren’t love, they are songs about love. I think worship is far more your response and your meditation and being confronted by what it means to receive grace and forgiveness from God."

On 22 August 2011 Bullock issued a triple CD compilation album, The Power of Your Love – The Songs of Geoff Bullock. He has said about his later work, "All my songs and my whole spiritual journey since [Hillsong] is all about what God has done for me, rather than what I would like to do."

He was interviewed in 2021 podcast of "I was a teenage fundamentalist" about his faith and his time at Hillsong.

In 2025, Bullock released an album consisting of demos of songs written between 2002 and 2013, titled Musical Notebook.

== Personal life ==
Bullock married Janine (born c. 1957, Lithgow) in 1980 and the couple had five children within a decade. Janine was choir master on some of Hillsong Music's releases, including Friends in High Places (July 1995). The marriage broke down in 1996 and he later recalled that "It was over before I knew it. I was just too busy to even notice what was happening. People say, 'Weren't there signs?' Of course there were signs. But we just thought OK, we'll just have to work harder – serve God harder – we'll do more for God and he will bless us. We separated within weeks of leaving Hills. It was a very hard time and it got worse as the months went on. I had to face the fact of my failure as a husband and a father."

Bullock's second wife was Victoria, They have raised her two children from a previous marriage.

Bullock has described his mental health issues, including "episodes of mania" and "long periods of depression". In 2003 he was diagnosed as having bipolar II disorder. In September 2010 he told Terry Allen of Christian Faith website of his condition, "[It] has caused all manner of symptoms in my life which has been confronting. One of the main ones being high levels of anxiety, which has seen me come and go publicly three times. I am now 10 years on and I feel the illness is manageable and the greatest gift, I think, is that I have been forced to learn insight into the way I think and the way that I do. I have learnt that by reflection on my past."

Bullock retired from the music industry in 2016 and lived on Scotland Island, just north of Sydney.

In 2023, Bullock married Sandy and together they moved to the Port Stephens region of the Central Coast of New South Wales.

== Bibliography ==
- Bullock, Geoff (1998), Hands Of Grace: Jesus, God's Symphony Of Hope, Strand Publishing, ISBN 978-0-9586866-8-6
- Bullock, Geoff (2000), Power Of Your Love: Jesus: The Unexpected God, Strand Publishing, ISBN 978-1-876825-49-2

== Discography ==
=== Albums ===
Title	Album details
The Heavens Shall Declare: The Songs of Geoff Bullock	Released: 1993; Label: Bredon Hill Music; Formats: CD, Cassette, Music Book
The Other Side	Released: May 1, 1995; Label: Hillsongs Australia; Formats: CD and Cassette
Now Is The Time: The Songs of Geoff Bullock 2	Released: 1996; Label: Bredon Hill Music; Formats: CD, Cassette and Music Book
The Watershed Project: Unfailing Love	Released: 1997; Label: Bredon Hill Music; Formats: CD
You Rescued Me: The First Ten Years Anthology 1987-1997	Released: January 1997; Label: Bredon Hill Music; Formats: 2× CD
Hands of Grace	Released: 1998; Label: Bredon Hill Music; Formats: CD and Cassette
A Symphony of Hope (by Geoff Bullock with Prague Philharmonic Orchestra)	Released: 21 May 1999; Label: Kingsway (KMCD2171); Formats: CD
Deeper and Deeper	Released: early 2001; Label: Breedon Hill Music (BHMCD1027); Formats: 2× CD
Geoff Bullock	Released: 2007; Label: Formats: CD
The Power of Your Love – The Songs of Geoff Bullock	Released: 22 August 2011; Label: Kingsway Music (KWCD3254); Formats: CD
