= Hilson =

Hilson is a surname. Notable people with the surname include:

- Dale Hilson (born 1992), Scottish footballer
- Jeff Hilson (born 1966), contemporary British poet
- Keri Hilson (born 1982), American singer, songwriter and actress
- Marie Hilson Katzenbach (1882–1970), American educator, president of the New Jersey State Board of Education
- Archibald Hilson Ross (1821–1900), Member of Parliament from the Otago Region of New Zealand

== See also ==
- Hillson
- Hillsong (disambiguation)
- Hilston
- Pilson
