= Hillson =

Hillson may refer to:

Surname

- Bobby Hillson, London-based fashion illustrator, founder of the Central Saint Martins MA Fashion course
- Jack Hillson, Canadian provincial politician
- Rowan Hillson (born 1951), British endocrinologist

Given name

- Hillson Beasley (1855–1936), English-trained architect

Aircraft

- Hillson Bi-mono, British experimental aircraft of the 1940s
- Hillson F.H.40 (Slip-wing Hurricane), British single-seat fighter aircraft
- Hillson Helvellyn, 1940s British two-seat training monoplane
- Hillson Pennine, 1930s United Kingdom two-seat cabin monoplane
- Hillson Praga or Praga E.114, single-engine sport airplane

== See also ==
- Hillsong (disambiguation)
