= History of Christianity in Ukraine =

The history of Christianity in the territory today known as Ukraine dates back to the earliest centuries of the history of Christianity, to the Apostolic Age, with mission trips along the Black Sea and a legend of Andrew the Apostle even ascending the hills of Kiev. The first Christian community on territory of modern Ukraine is documented as early as the 4th century with the establishment of the Metropolitanate of Gothia, which was centered in the Crimean peninsula. However, on territory of the Old Rus in Kiev, Christianity became the dominant religion since its official acceptance in 989 by Vladimir the Great (Volodymyr the Great), who brought it from Byzantine Crimea and installed it as the state religion of medieval Kievan Rus (Ruthenia), with the metropolitan see in Kiev.

Although separated into various Christian denominations, most Ukrainian Christians share a common faith based on Eastern Christianity. This tradition is represented in Ukraine by the Byzantine Rite, the Eastern Orthodox and Eastern Catholic churches, which have been at various historic times closely aligned with Ukrainian national self-identity and Byzantine culture.

Being officially eliminated since the end of World War II, the recent revival of Ukrainian national religions started just before dissolution of the Soviet Union in 1989 with reestablishment of the Ukrainian Greek Catholic Church which also triggered recovery of the Ukrainian Autocephalous Orthodox Church movement out of diaspora and transition of the former Russian Orthodox Church clergy who were native Ukrainians. Today, there are three national Ukrainian churches: the Orthodox Church of Ukraine, the Ukrainian Greek Catholic Church, and the Ukrainian Orthodox Church. Additionally, there is a smaller number of Byzantine rite adherents in the Ruthenian Greek Catholic Church who were dominated by the Kingdom of Hungary in the past. Western Christian bodies including the Latin Church of the Catholic Church and several Protestant denominations have had a limited presence on the territory of Ukraine since at least the 16th century and represent a minority of Christians in the country.

== Early history ==
=== Andrew the Apostle ===
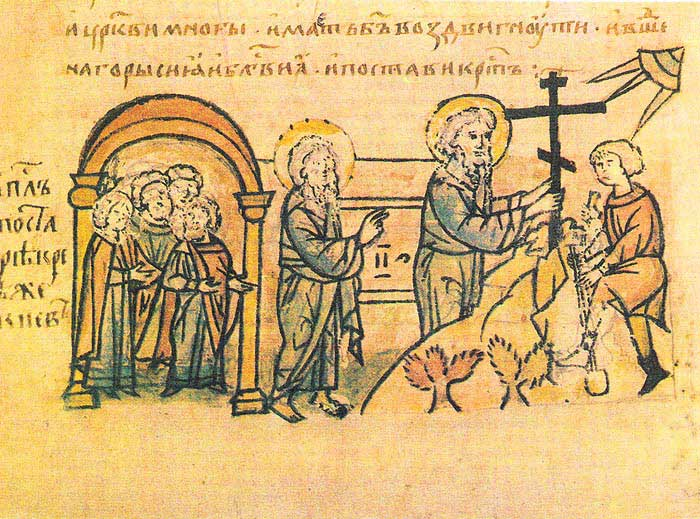
St Andrew's prophecy of Kiev depicted by his raising a cross, in the Radziwiłł Chronicle.

Andrew the apostle is believed to have travelled up the western shores of the Black Sea, to the area of present-day southern Ukraine, while preaching in the lands of Scythia. Legend (recorded in the Radziwiłł Chronicle) has it that he travelled further still, up the Dnieper River, until he came to the location of present-day Kiev in AD 55, where he erected a cross and prophesied the foundation of a great Christian city. Belief in the missionary visit of Andrew became widespread by the Middle Ages, and by 1621, a Kiev synod had declared him the "Rus'-apostle". Titus, a disciple of Andrew, is also venerated in Ukrainian churches, as are three "Scythian" disciples, Saints Ina, Pina and Rima, who accompanied him to Kiev. Both the 18th-century Church of St Andrew and an earlier structure from 1086 it replaced were purportedly built on the very location of the apostle's cross, planted on a hill overlooking the city of Kiev.

Although the Primary Chronicle refers to the apostle continuing his journey as far north as Novgorod, Andrew's visit to any of these lands has not been proven, and in fact may have been a later invention designed to boost the autocephalic aspirations in the territories where the upper clergy continued to be dominated by Greeks for several centuries.

These first half-legendary Christian churches on the territory of present Ukraine were eliminated by the Gothic invasion in the third century. The head of the "Scythian bishopric" presented at the First Ecumenical Council in Nicaea in 325 probably in fact was Bishop Cadmus from the Bosporan Kingdom.

=== Crimean roots ===
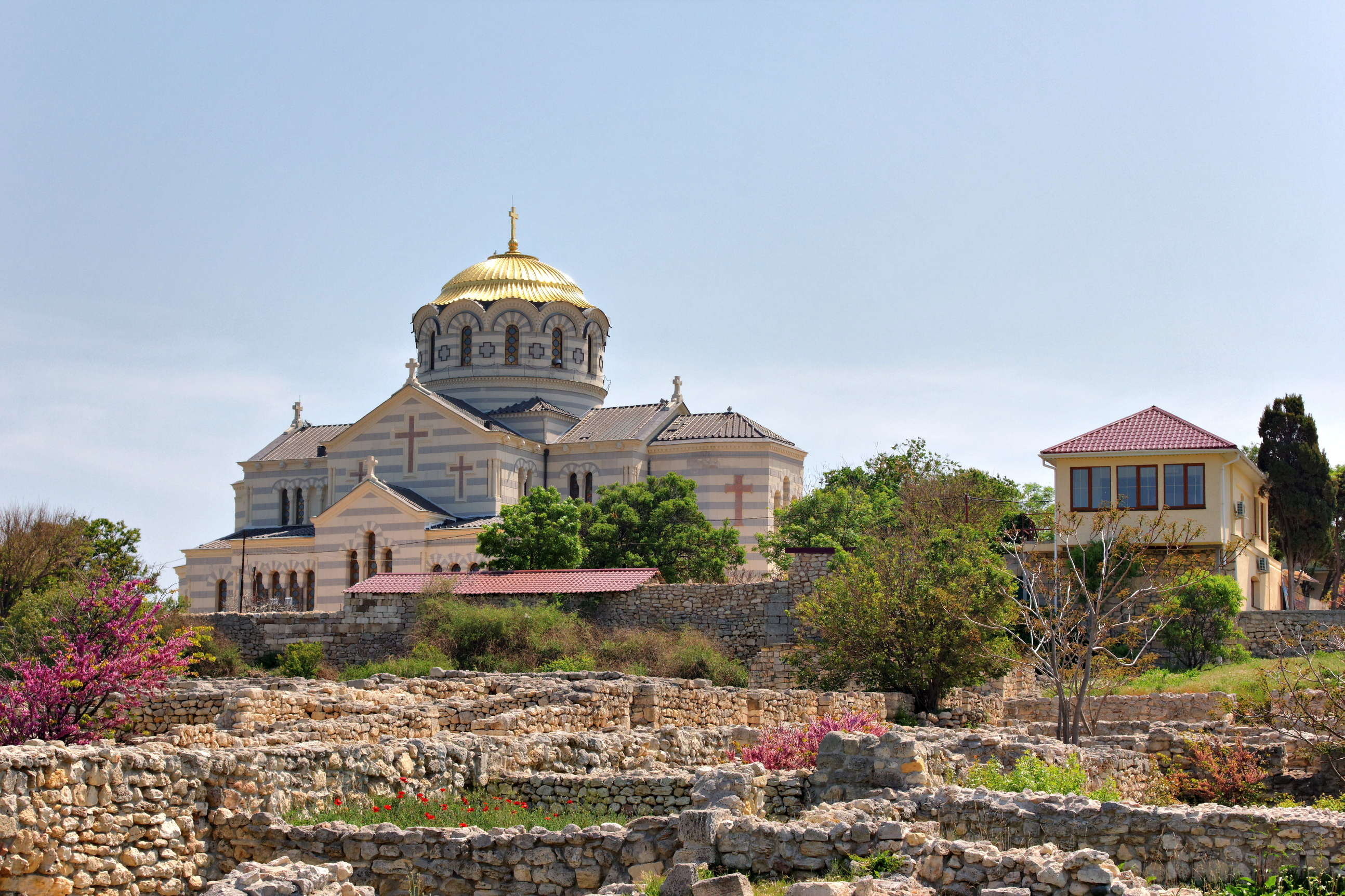
The ruins of Korsun (Chersonesos) Crimea, a place where East Slavic Christianity was born.

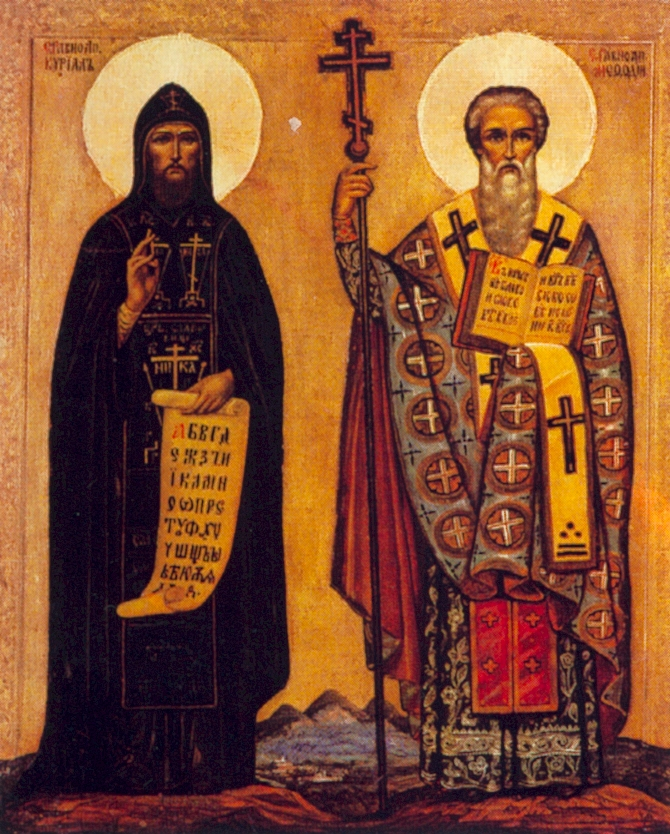
An Eastern Orthodox Icon depicting Equal-to-apostles Cyril and Methodius brothers as the Christian saints.

Pope Clement I (ruled 88–98) was exiled to Chersonesos on the Crimean peninsula in 102, as was Pope Martin I in 655. Furthermore, it has been definitively recorded that a representative from the Black Sea area, the "head of the Scythian bishopric", was present at the First Council of Nicaea in 325, as well as the First Council of Constantinople in 381; it has been surmised that this representative would have to have been Bishop Cadmus of the Bosporan Kingdom. Ostrogoths, who remained on present-day Ukrainian lands after the invasion of the Huns, established a metropolinate under the Bishop of Constantinople at Dorus in northern Crimea around the year 400. A bishop's seat had also existed since 868 across the Strait of Kerch, in the ancient city of Tmutarakan. The Polans and the Antes cultures, located so close to the Crimea, surely became familiarized with Christianity by this time.

=== Cyril and Methodius ===
The relics of Pope Martin were allegedly retrieved by the "Equal-to-apostles" brothers Cyril and Methodius, who passed through present-day Ukraine on their way to preach to the Khazars. Sent from Constantinople at the request of the ruler of Great Moravia, these brothers would add to foundation of Christianity in Ukraine by creating the Glagolitic alphabet, a precursor to the eponymous "Cyrillic script", which enabled the local population to worship God in Old Church Slavonic, a language closer to the vernacular Old East Slavic language than the Greek used to worship in Constantinople, or Latin in the west.

In response to local disputes with clerics of the Latin Church, Cyril and Methodius appealed in person to the Bishop of Rome in 867, bringing with them the relics of Pope Martin from Chersonesos. Their labors and request were met with approval, and their continued efforts planted the Christian faith into Ukrainian Rus. By 906, they had founded a diocese in Peremyshl, today a diocese of the Ukrainian Greek Catholic Church in Przemyśl, Poland. Their efforts, and those of their apostles, led to the translation of Christian Scriptures and service (liturgies) from Greek to Slavonic, and the eventual development of the modern Cyrillic alphabet.

== Early Rus' period ==
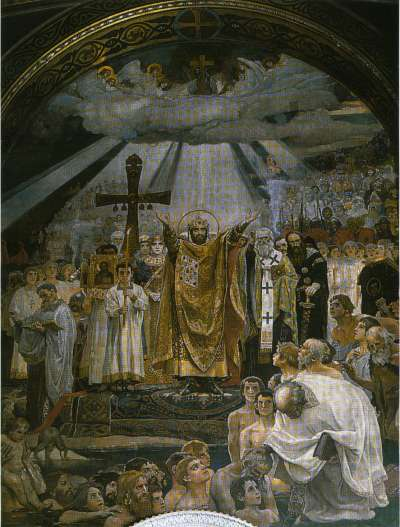
The Baptism of Kievans, a fresco by Viktor Vasnetsov.

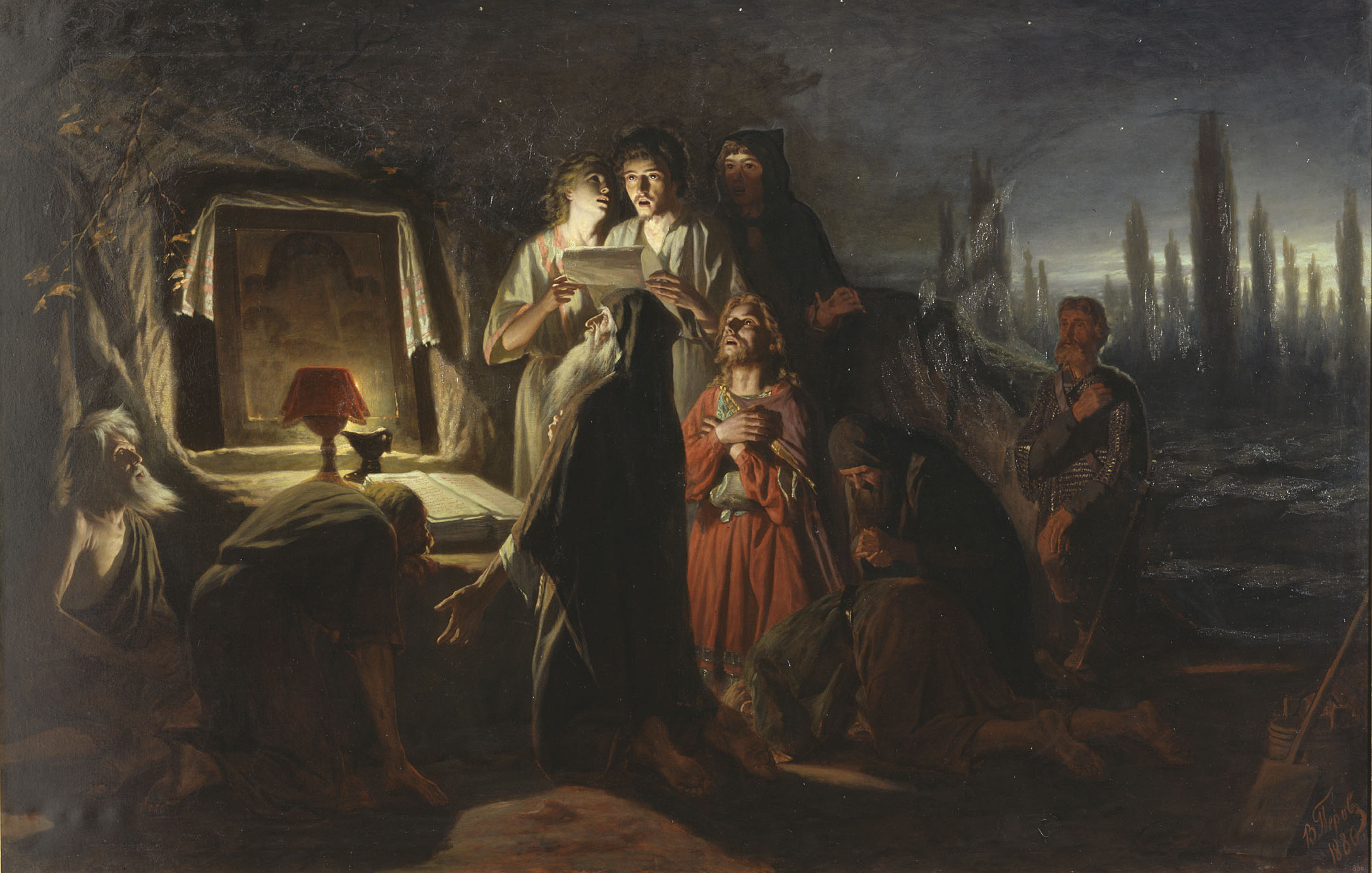
Clandestine and secret Christian communities existed in the Pagan Rus' long before its final Christianization. First Christians in Kiev by Vasily Perov.

By the 9th century, it is known that the Slavic population of western Ukraine (likely the White Croats) had accepted Christianity while under the rule of Great Moravia. However, it was the East Slavs who came to dominate most of the territory of present-day Ukraine, beginning with the rule of the Rus', whose pantheon of gods had held a considerable following for over 600 years.

Following the 860 assault on Constantinople by Rus' forces under the command of Askold and Dir, the two princes were baptized in that holy city. Returning to Kiev, the two actively championed Christianity for a period of 20 years, until they were murdered by the pagan Prince Oleg in the inter-princely rivalry for the Kiev throne. Patriarch Photios purportedly provided a bishop and priests from Constantinople to help in the Christianization of the Slavs. By 900, a church was already established in Kiev, St. Elijah's, modeled on a church of the same name in Constantinople. This gradual acceptance of Christianity is most notable in the Rus'-Byzantine Treaty of 945, which was signed by both "baptized" and unbaptized Rus'", according to the text included in the Primary Chronicle.

=== Establishment of the Kiev Metropolitan ===
Christianity acceptance among the Rus' nobility gained a vital proponent when Princess Olga, the ruler of Kiev, became baptized, taking the "Christian name" Helen. Her baptism in 955 (or 957) in either Kiev or Constantinople (accounts differ) was a turning point in religious life of Rus' but it was left to her grandson, Vladimir the Great, to make Kievan Rus a Christian state. Both Vladimir and Olga are venerated as the Equal-to-apostles saints by the Eastern Orthodox Church.

Princess Olga of Kiev shortly after her baptism appealed to the Holy Roman emperor Otto the Great to send missionaries into Kievan Rus. Adalbert, a Latin missionary bishop from Germany, was sent, but his missions and the priests who missionized along with him, were stopped. Most of the group of Latin missionaries were slain by pagan forces sent by Olga's son, Prince Svyatoslav, who had taken the Crown from his mother.

Christianity became dominant in the territory with the mass Baptism of Kiev in the Dnieper River in 988 ordered by Vladimir. That year is considered as the year of establishment of the Kiev Metropolis and part of the Ecumenical Patriarchate of Constantinople. The exact date of establishment is not clearly known as the Kiev eparchy (metropolis) is mentioned as early as 891. The first cathedral temple, Church of the Tithes (Assumption of Virgin Mary), was built in 996.

Following the Great Schism in 1054, the Kievan Rus that incorporated some of the modern Ukraine ended up on the Eastern Orthodox Byzantine side of the divided Christian world. Early on, the Orthodox Christian metropolitans had their seat in Pereyaslav, and later in Kiev. The people of Kiev lost their Metropolitan to Vladimir-Suzdal in 1299 (who retained the title), but gained a new Metropolitan in Halych in 1303. The religious affairs were also ruled in part by a Metropolitan in Navahrudak, (present-day Belarus).

== After the breakup of the Kievan Rus ==
In the 15th century, the primacy over the Ruthenian Orthodox Church was moved to Vilnius, under the title "Metropolis of Kiev and all Rus'". One clause of the Union of Krevo stipulated that Jagiello would disseminate Catholicism among Orthodox subjects of the Grand Duchy of Lithuania, of which Ukraine was a part. The opposition from the Ostrogskis and other Orthodox magnates led to this policy being suspended in the early 16th century.

Following the Union of Lublin, the Polonization of the Ukrainian church was accelerated. Unlike the Catholic Church, the Orthodox church in Ukraine was liable to various taxes and legal obligations. The building of new Orthodox churches was strongly discouraged. The Catholics were strictly forbidden to convert to Orthodoxy, and the marriages between Catholics and Orthodox were frowned upon. Orthodox subjects had been increasingly barred from high offices of state.

=== Union of Brest and its aftermath ===
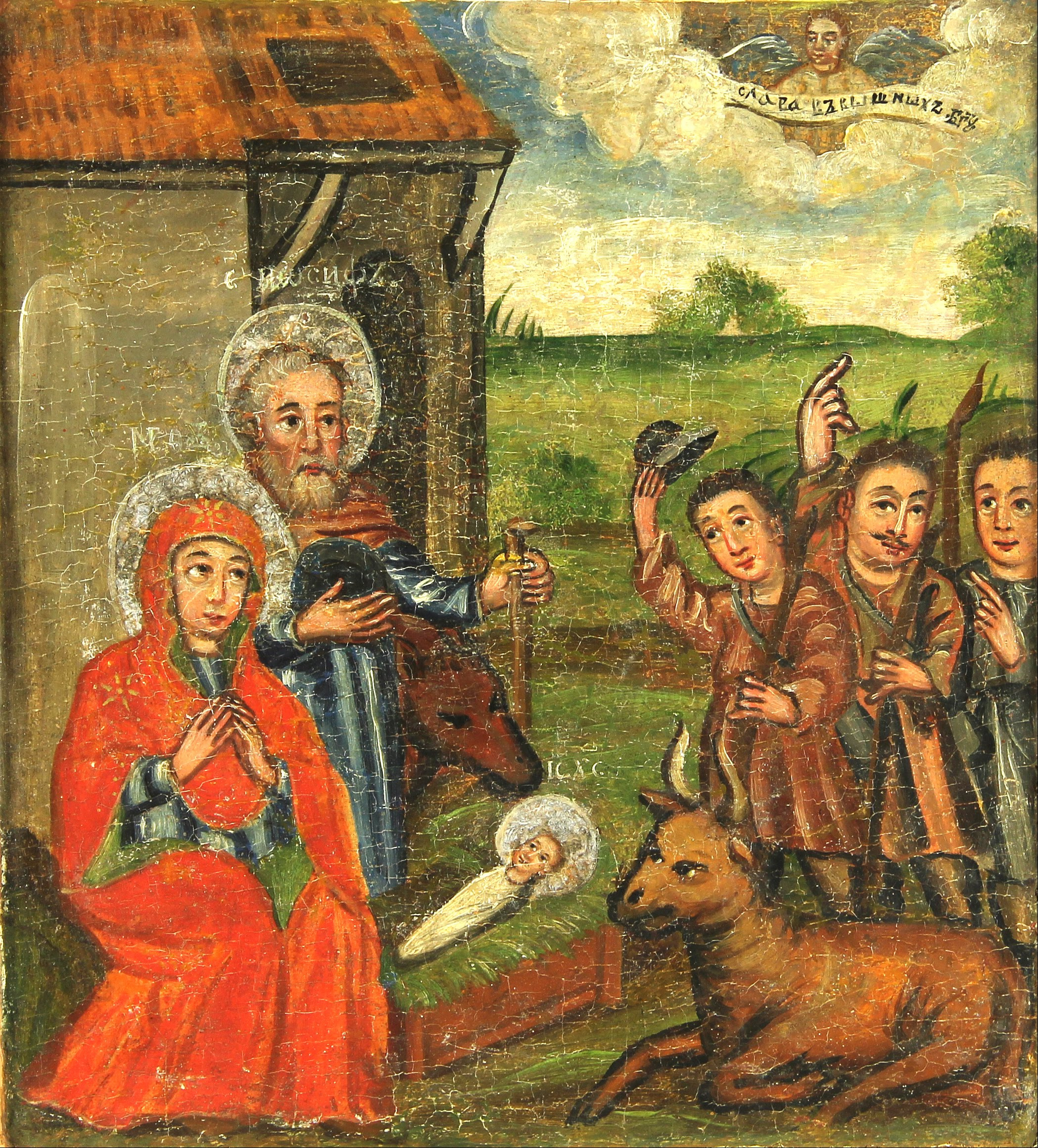
Christmas icon, Adoration of the Shepherds, from the Ivan Honchar Museum collection. Artist unknown, c. 1670.

In order to oppose such restrictions and to reverse cultural polonization of Orthodox bishops, the Ecumenical Patriarch encouraged the activity of the Orthodox urban communities called the "brotherhoods" (bratstvo). In 1589 Hedeon Balaban, the bishop of Lviv, asked the Pope to take him under his protection, because he was exasperated by the struggle with urban communities and the Ecumenical Patriarch. He was followed by the bishops of Lutsk, Cholm, and Turov in 1590. In the following years, the bishops of Volodymyr-Volynskyy and Przemyśl and the Metropolitan of Kiev announced their secession from the Ecumenical Patriarchate of Constantinople, which was increasingly influenced by the Ottomans. In 1595 some representatives of this group arrived to Rome and asked Pope Clement VIII to take them under his jurisdiction and unite them to the Apostolic See of Saint Peter.

In the Union of Brest of 1596 (colloquially known as unia), a part of the Ukrainian Church was accepted under the jurisdiction of the Roman Pope, becoming a Byzantine Rite Catholic Church, a Ukrainian Greek Catholic Church, colloquially known as the Uniate Church. While the new church gained many faithful among the Ukrainians in Galicia, the majority of Ukrainians in the rest of the lands remained within Eastern Orthodoxy with the church affairs ruled by then from Kiev under the metropolitan Petro Mohyla. The Orthodox Church was made illegal (its legality was partially restored in 1607), its property confiscated, and Orthodox believers faced persecution and discrimination which became an important reason for large numbers of Ukrainians to emigrate to Tsardom of Russia following the Union. The eastward spread of the Union of Brest led to violent clashes, for example, assassination of the Greek Catholic Archbishop Josaphat Kuntsevych by the Orthodox mob in Vitebsk in 1623.

=== Khmelnytsky Uprising ===
As the unia continued its expansion into Ukraine, its unpopularity grew, particularly in the southern steppes where Dnieper Cossacks lived. The Cossacks, who valued their traditions and culture, saw the unia as a final step of Polonization. As a result, they reacted by becoming fierce proponents of Orthodoxy. Such feelings played a role in the mass uprising whose targets included all non-Orthodox religious proponents, the Catholic and Uniate clergy and Jews. During this time metropolitan Mogila took full advantage of the moment to restore the Orthodox domination in Ukraine, including returning one of its sacred buildings, the Saint Sophia Cathedral in Kiev.

== Rule of the Empires ==
=== Territories gained by Pereyaslav Rada ===
In 1686, 40 years after Mogila's death, the Ottomans, acting on the behalf of the regent of Russia Sophia Alekseyevna, pressured the Patriarch of Constantinople into transferring the Orthodox Church of Kiev and all Rus' from the jurisdiction of Constantinople to the Patriarch of Moscow, established a century prior to that. The legality of this step is occasionally questioned to this day along with the fact that the transfer was accompanied by graft and bribery, which in church affairs amounts to an ecclesiastical crime. The transfer itself, however, led to the significant Ukrainian domination of the Russian Orthodox Church, which continued well into the 18th century, Feofan Prokopovich, Epifany Slavinetsky, Stephen Yavorsky and Demetrius of Rostov being among the most notable representatives of this trend.

=== Territories gained from Crimean Khanate ===
In the late 18th century, the Crimean Khanate (Vassal for Ottoman Empire) was conquered by Russia, and the latter annexed most of the southern steppes and Crimea. Colonization of these lands was actively encouraged by Orthodox people, particularly Ukrainians, Russians and Serbs. As New Russia (Novorossiya, as it was then known) was settled, new Orthodox parishes were created. Construction of cathedrals that demonstrate some of the finest examples of late-19th-century Russian Architecture was undertaken in large cities such as Odesa and Sevastopol.

=== Territories gained from partitions ===
In the late 17th century Poland became less and less influential and internal corruption as well as the pressure from its powerful neighbors resulted in its partitions by neighbouring empires. The Russian Empire, in particular, gained most of ethnically Ukrainian land and all of the Belarusian lands. After nearly two centuries of polonization, the Uniate influence on the Ukrainian population was so great that hardly any remained Orthodox. Although some, particularly in Podolia, chose to revert to Orthodoxy soon after, this in many cases was an exception rather than trend and in locations where the Unia already gave deep roots into the population all of the church property remained in the Catholic and Uniate authority. Also significant was Empress Catherine II's decree "On the newly acquired territory", according to which most of the Polish magnates retained all their lands and property (thus a significant control over population) in the newly acquired lands.

Nevertheless, the first Russophile tendencies began to surface, and came in face of the Uniate Bishop Joseph Semashko. Believing that the Uniate Church's role as an interim bridge between Orthodoxy and their eventual path to Catholicism is over, now that the ruler of the lands is no longer a Catholic, but an Orthodox Monarch, he began to push for an eventual reversion of all Uniates. Although the idea was shared by growing number of the lower priests, the ruling Uniate synod, controlled by the strong Polish influence, rejected all Semashko's suggestions. In addition many of the Latin Church Catholic authorities responded to this by actively imposing Latin practice and hierarchy.

In 1831, the general discontent of the Poles with the Russian rule erupted into a revolt, now known as the November Uprising, which the Uniate Church officially supported. However, the uprising failed, and the Russian authorities were quick to respond to its organisers and areas of strongest support. The outcome was that the Uniate synod's members were removed along with most of the Polish magnates privileges' and authority being taken away. With the Polish influence in the Ruthenian lands significantly reduced and in some cases eliminated, the Uniate Church began to disintegrate. In Volhynia the famous Pochayiv Lavra was returned to Russian Orthodox clergy in 1833. The final blow came from the Synod of Polotsk in 1839 headed by the ex-Uniate Bishop Semashko, where it was agreed to terminate the accords of Union of Brest and all of the remaining Uniate property on the territory of the Belarus and Right Bank Ukraine within the Russian Empire was incorporated into the Russian Orthodox Church. Those Uniate clergy who refused to join the Russian Orthodox Church (593 out of a total of 1,898 in Ukraine and Belarus) were exiled to the Russian interior or Siberia. By means of mass deportations, persecution and even executions the Uniates were practically eliminated in the Russian Empire. Only a small number of Greek Catholics in the Kholm Governorate managed to preserve their faith.

Within the Russian Empire, the Uniate Church continued to function until 1875, when the Eparchy of Chelm was abolished.The greater longevity of the Uniate Church in this region was attributed to the fact that it came under Russian control later than did the other territories (1809) and that, unlike other Ukrainian regions within the Russian Empire, it had been part of the Congress Poland, which had some autonomy until 1865. Within Chelm, the conversion to Orthodoxy met with strong resistance from the local ethnic Ukrainian priests and parishioners, and was accomplished largely through the efforts of Russian police, Cossacks, and immigrating Russophile priests from eastern Galicia. The resistance was strong enough that when, a generation later in 1905, the formally Eastern Orthodox population of Chelm was allowed to return to Catholicism (Russian authorities only allowing conversion to the Latin Church), 170,000 out of 450,000 did so by 1908.

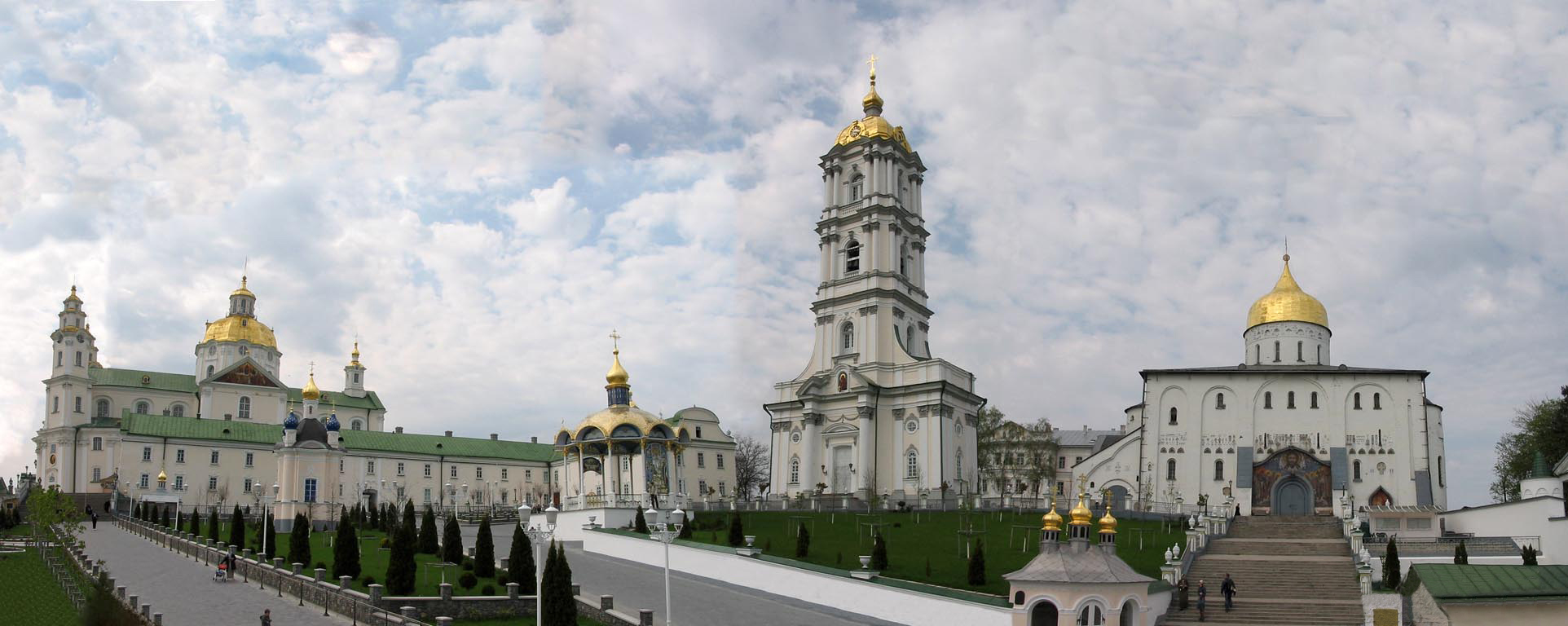
Pochayiv Lavra, located right next to the border of the Russian Empire and Austria-Hungary after its return to Orthodoxy in 1833 became a major bastion against the Catholic-ruled Galicia.

=== Austrian Galicia and World War I ===
Although the Partitions of Poland awarded most of the Ruthenian lands to the Russian Empire, this excluded the southwestern Kingdom Of Galicia (constituting the modern Lviv, Ivano-Frankivsk and parts of Ternopil oblasts), which fell under the control of the Habsburg monarchy and subsequently the Austrian Empire and the Austria-Hungary. Similarly to the situation in the lands of the Russian Empire, the Uniate Ruthenian (Ukrainian) peasantry was largely under the Polish Latin Catholic domination. The Austrians granted equal legal privileges to the Uniate Church and removed Polish influence. They also mandated that Uniate seminarians receive a formal higher education (previously, priests had been educated informally by other priests, usually their fathers, as the vocation was passed on within families), and organized institutions in Vienna and Lviv that would serve this function. This led to the appearance, for the first time, of a large educated social class within the Ukrainian population in Galicia. As a result, within Austrian Galicia over the next century the Uniate Church ceased being a puppet of foreign interests and became the primary cultural force within the Ukrainian community. Most independent native Ukrainian cultural trends (such as Rusynophilia, Russophilia and later Ukrainophilia) emerged from within the ranks of the Uniate Church. The participation of Uniate priests or their children in western Ukrainian cultural and political life was so great that western Ukrainians were accused of wanting to create a theocracy in western Ukraine by their Polish rivals.

During the 19th century there was a struggle within the Uniate Church (and therefore within the general Galician society due to its domination by priests) between Russophiles who desired union with Russia and Ukrainophiles who saw the Galician Ruthenians as Ukrainians, not Russians. The former group were mostly represented by older and more conservative elements of the priesthood, while the latter ideology was more popular among the younger priests. The Russophilia of the Galician Ruthenians was particularly strong during the mid-19th century, although by the end of that century the Russophiles had declined in importance relative to the Ukrainophiles. The Austrian authorities during this time began to be more and more involved in the power-struggle with Russia for the rule of the Balkans, as the declining Ottoman Empire withdrew, and in so doing opposed the Russophiles. The Balkans themselves were largely Orthodox and crucial to the Russian Panslavism movement. In this situation, the Galician Ruthenians found themselves in the pawn's position.

When the power struggle erupted into the First World War, the Russian Army initially quickly overran Galicia (see Eastern Front (World War I)). Free of Polish domination, unlike in other areas of Ukraine the Uniate church had become closely linked to the Ukrainian people and the Ukrainian national movement. For this reason, the population in general were quite loyal to the Austrian Habsburgs, earning the nickname "Tyroleans of the East", and resisted reunion into the Orthodox Church. A minority of them, however, welcomed the Russians and reverted to Orthodoxy. After regaining the lost territories with the counterattack in late 1914, the Austrian authorities responded with repressions: several thousand Orthodox and Russophilic people died while being interred at a Talerhof concentration camp for those deemed disloyal to Austria. Already a minority, the Russophiles were largely extinguished as a religious-cultural force in Galicia as a result of these actions.

== Twentieth and twenty-first centuries ==
=== Soviet Union ===
After the Russian Revolution and the Russian Civil War the Bolsheviks seized power in the Russian Empire and transformed it into the Soviet Union. Religion in the new socialist society was assigned little value by the state, but in particular Russian Orthodox Church was distrusted because of its active support of the White Movement. Massive arrests and repressions began immediately. In the Ukrainian SSR (one of the founding republics of the USSR) as early as in December 1918 the first execution of the head of the Ukrainian Exarchate Metropolitan of Kiev and Halych took place. This was only the start which culminated in mass closing and destruction of churches (some standing since the days of the Kievan Rus) and executions of clergy and followers.

Ukraine was controlled by several short-lived yet independent governments which revived the Ukrainian national idea. Ukraine declared its political independence following the fall of the Provisional Government in 1918 and the Ukrainian Autocephalous Orthodox Church was established.

Following the Soviet regime's taking root in Ukraine and despite the ongoing Soviet-wide antireligious campaign, the Bolshevik authorities saw the national churches as a tool in their goal to suppress the Russian Orthodox Church always viewed with the great suspicion by the regime for its being the cornerstone of pre-revolutionary Russian Empire and the initially strong opposition the church took towards the regime change (the position of the patriarch Tikhon of Moscow was especially critical).

On November 11, 1921 , an unrecognised Church Council started in Kiev. The council would proclaim the first formation of the Ukrainian Autocephalous Orthodox Church (UAOC). The Russian Orthodox Church strongly opposed the formation of the Ukrainian autocephaly and not a single ordained bishop was willing or able to ordain the hierarchy for a new church. Therefore, the clergy "ordained" its own hierarchy itself, a practice questionable under the canon law, in the "Alexandrian" manner - by laying on priests' hands on two senior candidates who became known as Metropolitan Vasyl (Lypkivsky) and Archbishop Nestor (Sharayivsky) (reportedly the relics of Clement of Rome who died in Ukraine in the 1st century were also used). Despite the canon law controversy, the new church was recognized in 1924 by the Ecumenical Patriarch Gregory VII.

In the wake of the Ukrainization policies carried out in Soviet Ukraine in the first decade of the Soviet rule many of the Orthodox clergy willfully joined the church thus avoiding the persecution suffered by many clergy members who remained inside the Russian Orthodox Church. During the period in which the Soviet government tolerated the renewed Ukrainian national church the UAOC gained a wide following particularly among the Ukrainian peasantry.

Ruins of the St. Michael's Golden-Domed Monastery after its destruction in 1936

In the early-1930s the Soviet government abruptly reversed the policies in the national republics and mass arrests of UAOC's hierarchy and clergy culminated in the liquidation of the church in 1930. Most of the surviving property was officially transferred to the ROC, with some churches closed for good and destroyed. On the eve of the Second World War only 3% of the pre-revolutionary parishes on the territory of Ukraine remained open to the public, often hidden in deep rural areas.

=== Second Polish Republic ===
The 1921 Peace of Riga treaty that ended the Polish-Soviet War gave the significant areas of the ethnically Ukrainian (and Belarusian) territories to the reborn Polish state. This included Polesie and Volhynia, areas with almost exclusively Orthodox population amongst the rural peasants, as well as the former Austrian province of Galicia with its Uniate population.

The Greek Catholic church, which functions in communion with the Latin Catholicism, could have hoped to receive a better treatment in Poland, whose leadership, especially the endecja party, saw the Catholicism as one of the main tools to unify the nation where non-Polish minority comprised over one third of the citizenry. Nevertheless, the Poles saw the Greek Catholic Galicia Ukrainians as even less reliable and loyal as the Orthodox Volhynia Ukrainians. Also, despite the communion with Rome, the UGCC attained a strong Ukrainian national character of the Ukrainian Greek Catholic Church, and the Polish authorities sought to weaken it in various ways. In 1924, following a visit with the Ukrainian Catholic believers in North America and western Europe, the head of the UGCC was initially denied reentry to Lviv until after a considerable delay. Polish priests led by their bishops began to undertake missionary work among Eastern Catholic faithful, and the administrative restrictions were placed on the Ukrainian Greek Catholic Church.

With respect to the Orthodox Ukrainian population in eastern Poland, the Polish government initially issued a decree defending the rights of the Orthodox minorities. In practice, this often failed, as the Catholics, also eager to strengthen their position, had stronger representation in the Sejm and the courts. During the Polish rule, 190 Orthodox churches were destroyed (although some of them have already been abandoned) and 150 were forcibly transformed into Catholic (not Ukrainian Catholic) churches. Such actions were condemned by the head of the Ukrainian Catholic Church, metropolitan Andrei Sheptytsky, who claimed that these acts would "destroy in the souls of our non-united Orthodox brothers the very thought of any possibility of reunion."

In addition to persecution from the new authorities, the Orthodox clergy found itself with no ecclesiastical link to submit to. Like most ex-Russian Orthodox communities that ended up outside the USSR, and thus with no possible contact with the persecuted mother church, the Ecumenical Patriarchate of Constantinople agreed to take over Moscow Patriarchate's role and in 1923 the Polish Orthodox Church was formed out of the parishes that were on the territory of the Polish republic although 90% of its clergy and believers were non-Polish people.

=== Czechoslovakia ===
The redrawal of national boundaries following World War I also affected yet another ethnically Ruthenian territory. In 1920, the country of Czechoslovakia was formed, the nation included several minorities. In the easternmost end of the country, Transcarpathia lived the Rusyn population. For most of their history they were ruled by the Hungarians, who unlike the Austrians ruling Galicia were quite active in opposing Ukrainophile sentiments. Instead, the Hungarians supported a Rusyn identity (separate from either a pro-Ukrainian or pro-Russian orientation) through pro-Hungarian priests in an effort to separate the Ruthenian people under their rule from their brethren across the mountains. Thus despite being Uniate at the time of the formation of Czechoslovakia, the population was about evenly divided between Rusynophile, Ukrainophile and Russophile orientation. The general Russophilic sentiment was very strong amongst them, and these cultural and political orientations impacted the local religious communities. Even before the first world war already quite a lot of distant mountain communities were de facto Orthodox, where priests simply ceased to follow the Uniate canons. However, much more significant changes took place in the interwar period.

In the 1920s many Russian emigres, particularly Orthodox clergy, settled in Serbia. Loyal to the Orthodox state, they became actively involved in missionary work in central Europe. A group, headed by Bishop Dosifei went to Transcarpathia. Because of the historical links between the local Greek Catholic clergy to the disliked Hungarian authorities, mass conversions to the Orthodox Church occurred. By the start of the Second World War, approximately one third of all of the Rusyn population reverted to Orthodoxy . The region's local Hungarian population, estimated at slightly less than 20% of the population, remained overwhelmingly Calvinist or Catholic. (For the Ruthenian population left outside Ukraine in 1945 (today Prešov territory in Slovakia) see Czech and Slovak Orthodox Church).

=== Second World War ===
On September 17, 1939, with Poland crumbling under the German attack that started the Second World War, the Red Army attacked Poland, assigning territories with an ethnic Ukrainian majority to Soviet Ukraine. Because the Ukrainians were by-and-large discontented with Polish rule most of the Orthodox clergy actually welcomed the Soviet troops.

The addition of the ethnic Ukrainian territory of Volhynia to the USSR created several issues. Having avoided the Bolshevik repression, the Orthodox church of this rural region outnumbered the rest of the Ukrainian SSR by nearly a thousand churches and clergy as well as many cloisters including the Pochayiv Lavra. The ecclesiastical link with the Moscow Patriarchate was immediately restored. Within months nearly a million Orthodox pilgrims, from all over the country, fearing that these reclaimed western parishes would share the fate of others in the USSR, took the chance to visit them. However, the Soviet authorities, although confiscating some of the public property, did not show the repressions of the post-revolutionary period that many expected and no executions or physical destruction took place.

On October 8, 1942, Archbishop Nikanor and Bishop Mstyslav (later a Patriarch) of the UAOC and Metropolitan Oleksiy (Hromadsky) of the Ukrainian Autonomous Orthodox Church concluded an Act of Union, uniting the two national churches at the Pochayiv Lavra. Later German occupation authorities and pro-Russian hierarchs of the Autonomous Church convinced Metropolitan Oleksiy to remove his signature. Metropolitan Oleksiy was murdered in Volhynia on May 7, 1943, by the nationalists of the Ukrainian Insurgent Army which saw this as treason.

=== Post-war situations ===
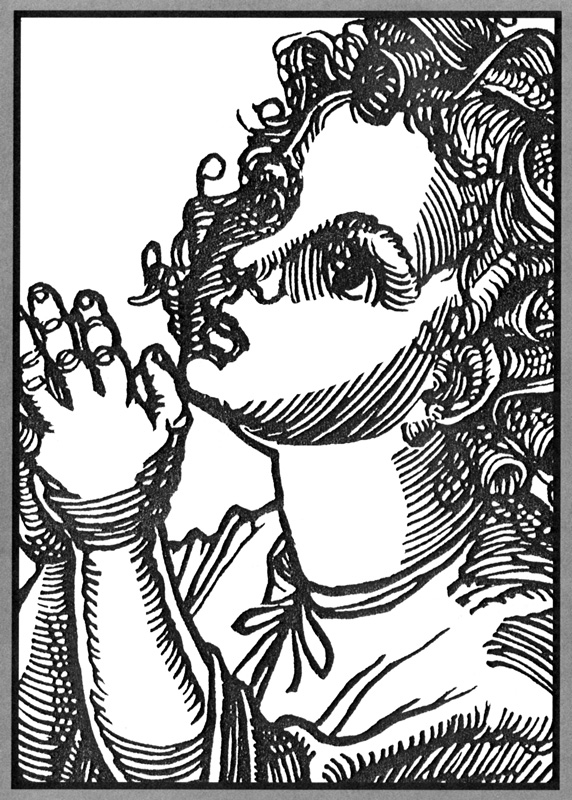
Praying child by Jacques Hnizdovsky

The Russian Orthodox Church regained its general monopoly in the Ukrainian SSR after World War II following another shift in the official Soviet attitude towards Christian churches. As a result, many started to accuse it of being a puppet of the Communist Party of the Soviet Union. After the suspicious death of Patriarch Tikhon, the UAOC and UGCC sought to avoid the transfer under the Moscow Patriarchate; something that Moscow tolerated until after World War II, for example the head of the Ukrainian Communist Party, Nikita Khrushchev attended the funeral of the head of the Uniate Church in 1946. Nevertheless, as the Uniate Church did in some cases support the Nazi regime, the overall Soviet attitude was negative. In 1948 a small group of priests started to proclaim a reunion with Orthodoxy. The Soviet state organized in 1948 a synod in Lviv, where the 1596 Union of Brest was annulled, thereby breaking the canonical ties with Rome and transferring under the Moscow Patriarchate. In Transcarpathia, the reigning Greek Catholic bishop, Theodore Romzha, was murdered and the remaining priests were forced to return their Church to Orthodoxy. This move's acceptance was mixed. With many clergy members and lay believers turning to the ROC, some adamantly refused. As a result of this the Patriarchate of Moscow could now legally lay claim to any Orthodox church property that was within the territory of its uncontested jurisdiction, which it did. Some believers refused to accept liquidation of their churches and for nearly 40 years the UAOC and UGCC existed in Western Ukraine underground led by the clergy members under the threat of prosecution by the Soviet state. Much of the UGCC and UAOC clergy not willing to serve in the ROC emigrated to Germany, the United States, or Canada. Others were sent to Siberia and even chose to be martyred. Officially the Moscow Patriarchate never recognised the canonical right of the synod as it lacked any bishops there.

The relatively permissive post-war government attitude towards the Orthodox Church came to an end with Khrushchev's "Thaw" programme, which included closing the recently opened Kiev's Caves Lavra. However, in the west-Ukrainian dioceses, which were the largest in the USSR, the Soviet attitude was "softest". In fact in the western city of Lviv, only one church was closed. The Moscow Patriarchate also relaxed its canons on the clergy, especially those from the former-uniate territories, allowing them, for example to shave beards (a very uncommon Orthodox practice) and conduct eulogy in Ukrainian instead of Church Slavonic.

=== Late Soviet period ===
In 1988 with the millennium anniversary of the baptism of Rus, there was yet another shift in the Soviet attitude towards religion, coinciding with the Perestroika and Glasnost programmes. The Soviet Government publicly apologized for oppression of religion and promised to return all property to the rightful owners. As a result, thousands of closed religious buildings in all areas of the USSR were returned to their original owners. In Ukraine this was the then ROC's Ukrainian Exarchate, which took place in the central, eastern and southern Ukraine. In the former-uniate areas of western Ukraine things were more turbulent. As UGCC survived in diaspora and in the underground they took their chance and were immediately revived in Ukraine, where in the wake of general liberalization of the Soviet policies in the late-1980s the activization of Ukrainian national political movements was also prompted. The Russian Orthodox Church became viewed by some as an attribute of Soviet domination, and bitter, often violent clashes over church buildings followed with the ROC slowly losing its parishes to the UGCC.

The UAOC also followed suit. Sometimes possessors of Church buildings changed several times within days. Although the Soviet law-enforcement did attempt to pacify the almost-warring parties, these were often unsuccessful, as many of the local branches in the ever-crumbling Soviet authority sympathised with the national sentiments in their areas. Violence grew especially after the UGCC's demand that all property that was held prior to 1939 would be returned.

It is now believed that the only real event which helped to contain the growing schism in the former-uniate territories was the ROC's reaction of raising its Ukrainian Exarchate to the status of an autonomous church, which took place in 1990, and up until the break up of the USSR in late 1991 there was an uneasy peace in western Ukraine. After the nation became independent, the question of an independent and an autocephalous Orthodox Church arose once again.

=== Post-Soviet period ===
In November 1991, Filaret, the Metropolitan of Kyiv, asked the hierarchy of the Russian Orthodox Church to grant the Ukrainian Orthodox Church (UOC) autocephalous status. The skeptical hierarchy of the Russian Orthodox Church called for a full Synodical council (Sobor) where this issue would have been discussed at length. Filaret, using his support from the old friendship-ties with the then newly elected President of Ukraine (Leonid Kravchuk), convinced Kravchuk that a new independent government should have its own independent church.

In January 1992 Filaret convened an assembly at the Kiev Pechersk Lavra that adopted a request of autocephaly for Ukrainians, addressed to the Moscow Patriarch.

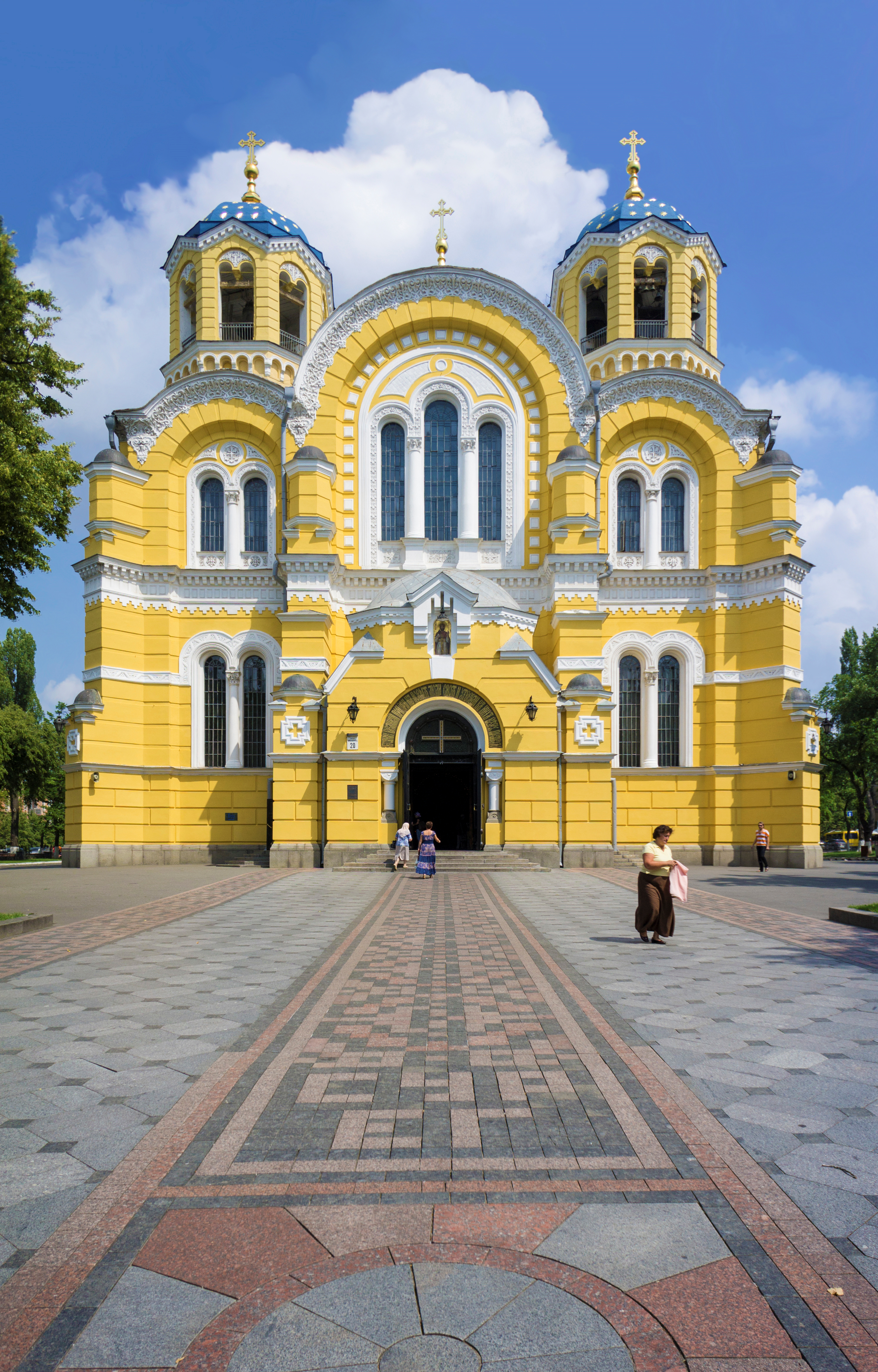
St Volodymyr's Cathedral in Kyiv, built between 1862 and 1882 in honour of the 900th anniversary of the Baptism of Kiev as a jewel of Neo-Byzantine architecture in the Russian Empire, became a battleground between opposing church bodies and their political supporters.

Upon returning to Kyiv from a Russian Orthodox Church synod meeting, Filaret carried out his reserve option: he revealed that his resignation from the position of Primate of the UOC had taken place under pressure and that he would not resign. The Ukrainian President Leonid Kravchuk gave Filaret his support, as did the Ukrainian nationalist paramilitaries, in retaining his rank. In a crisis moment the Hierarchical Council of the Ukrainian Orthodox Church agreed to another synod which met in May 1992. The council convened in the eastern city of Kharkiv, where the majority of the bishops voted to suspend Filaret from his clerical functioning. Simultaneously they elected a new leader, Metropolitan Volodymyr (Viktor Sabodan), native of the Khmelnytskyi Oblast and a former Patriarchal Exarch to Western Europe.

With only three bishops giving him support, Filaret initiated unification with the UAOC, and in June 1992 established a new Ukrainian Orthodox Church - Kyiv Patriarchate (UOC-KP) with 94-year-old Patriarch Mstyslav of the UAOC as a leader. While chosen as Mstyslav's assistant, Filaret de facto ruled the new Church. A few of the Autocephalous bishops and clergy who opposed such situation refused to join the new church, even after the death of Mstyslav in June 1993. The church was once again ripped apart by a schism and most of the UAOC parishes were regained when the churches re-separated in July 1993.

Most of the fate of control of church buildings was decided by the church parishes, but as most refused to follow Filaret, paramilitaries, especially in Volyn and Rivne Oblasts where there was strong nationalist sympathy amongst the new regional authorities, carried out raids bringing property under their control. The lack of parishes in eastern and southern Ukraine prompted President Kravchuk to intervene and to force buildings still closed from the Communist era to re-open under the UOC-KP's ownership. Upon the 1994 election of Leonid Kuchma as President of Ukraine, most of the violence was promptly stopped, and the presidency adopted a de facto neutrality attitude to all the four major church groups.

=== Modern times ===
The recent events of the 2004 Ukrainian presidential election and the Orange Revolution affected the religious affairs in the nation as well. Members of the UOC (MP) actively supported the former Prime minister Viktor Yanukovych while members of the UOC-KP, UAOC, and UGCC supported the opposition candidate Viktor Yushchenko, who was running against him. After Yushchenko's victory, the UOC (MP) criticised him for what they see as support of the "uncanonical organisations", such as his celebrating Orthodox Christmas in St Volodymyr's Cathedral (owned by UOC-KP). Yushchenko himself has publicly pledged to distance himself from Orthodox politics during his presidential campaign. Nonetheless, he claims that his intention is to achieve a unity of the nation's Eastern Orthodox Church affairs. Questions still arise on what will be the ecclesiastical status of the Church and who will head it, and as of February 2007 no public dialogue has begun.

To date the issue between rivalries of different churches remains politicised and sensitive and also controversial. In a 2007 survey 33.3% felt satisfied with the current condition of several Orthodox Churches. At the same time up to 42.1% felt it would be important for a single united church, with 30.7% favoring the UOC-KP and 11.4% the UOC (MP). On the question of who shall head the church the political polarisation of the country surfaced - 56.1% of voters of Our Ukraine and 40.7% of voters from the Bloc Yulia Tymoshenko endorsed wanting one Orthodox Church under the Kyiv Patriarchate.

On 15 December 2018, members of the existing Ukrainian Orthodox churches (the UOC-KP, the UAOC and two bishops who had left the UOC) voted through their representatives (bishops) to unite into the Orthodox Church of Ukraine on the basis of complete canonical independence. They elected their primate and adopted a charter for the Orthodox Church of Ukraine.

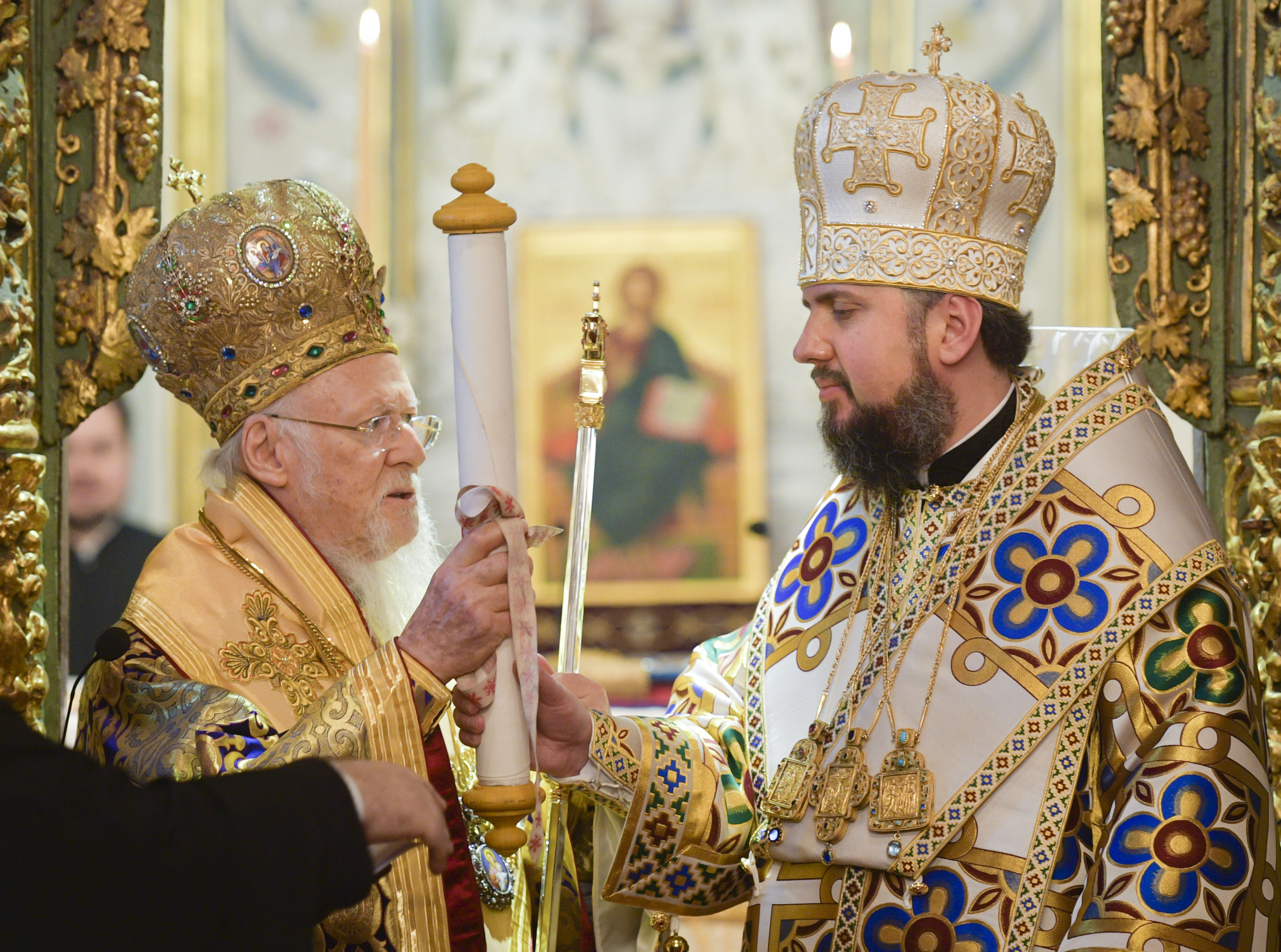
Ecumenical Patriarch Bartholomew (left) handing the tomos of autocephaly to Metropolitan Epiphanius (right)

Metropolitan Epiphanius of the UOC-KP, who had been chosen on 13 December by the UOC-KP as its only candidate, and was considered as Filaret's right arm and protégé, was elected Metropolitan of Kyiv and all Ukraine by the unification council on 15 December 2018 after the second round of voting.

On 1 January 2019, Ecumenical Patriarch Bartholomew confirmed his intention to grant the tomos of autocephaly to Metropolitan Epiphany on 6 January 2019, the day of Christmas Eve according to the old Julian calendar.

On 5 January 2019, Ecumenical Patriarch Bartholomew and Metropolitan Epiphanius celebrated a Divine Liturgy in St. George's Cathedral in Istanbul; the tomos was signed thereafter, also in St. George's Cathedral.

The tomos "has come into force from the moment of its signing". The signing of the tomos officially established the autocephalous Orthodox Church of Ukraine. President Poroshenko traveled to Istanbul to attend the signing ceremony.

After the tomos was signed, Ecumenical Patriarch Batholomew made an address to Metropolitan Epiphanius. President Poroshenko and Metropolitan Epiphanius also made speeches. On 6 January, after a Liturgy celebrated by Metropolitan Epiphanius and Ecumenical Patriarch Bartholomew, Ecumenical Patriarch Bartholomew read the tomos of the OCU and then gave it to Metropolitan Epiphanius. President Poroshenko was present during the signing and handing over of the tomos.

On 9 January 2019, the tomos was brought back to Istanbul so that all the members of the Holy Synod of the Ecumenical Patriarchate could sign the tomos. The tomos has now been fully ratified, and will be returned again to Kyiv where it will remain permanently. The representative of the press service of the OCU, priest Ivan Sydor, said the tomos was valid after the signature of the Ecumenical Patriarch, "but according to the procedure, there must also be the signatures of those bishops who take part in the synod of the Constantinople Patriarchate." Former press secretary of the UOC-KP, Eustratius (Zorya), declared the Ecumenical Patriarch recognized the OCU by signing the tomos of autocephaly and by concelebrating the liturgy with Epiphanius while considering Epiphanius as primate of the OCU. The Ecumenical Patriarchate declared on 8 January 2018 that the tomos was "approved and valid" and that the signing by the whole synod was a "purely technical step". It added that Ukraine had asked for the tomos to be brought to Ukraine for Christmas instead of leaving it in Istanbul for a few days until the whole synod signed it.

== Main religious groups ==
The main religious groups are presented below:

=== Eastern Orthodox ===
==== Orthodox Church of Ukraine ====
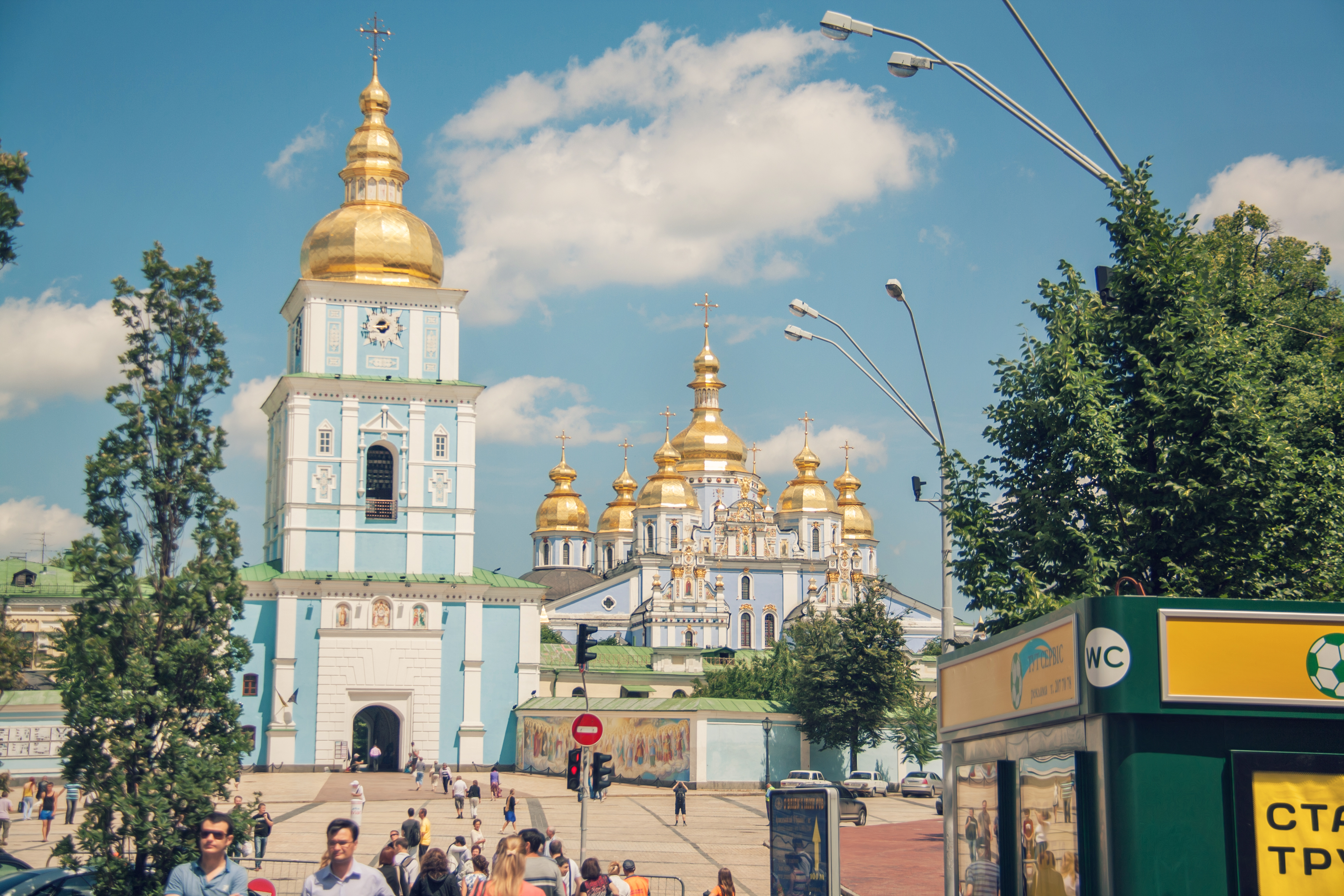
St. Michael's Golden-Domed Monastery is used by the OCU as its Mother Church.

Abbreviated as the OCU, the church was established by a unification council on 15 December 2018, and received its tomos of autocephaly (decree of ecclesial independence) by Ecumenical Patriarchate of Constantinople on 5 January 2019. The council voted to unite the existing Ukrainian Orthodox jurisdictions: the Ukrainian Orthodox Church – Kyiv Patriarchate (UOC-KP), the Ukrainian Autocephalous Orthodox Church (UAOC) and two bishops of the Ukrainian Orthodox Church (UOC).

The primate of the church is the Metropolitan of Kyiv and all Ukraine. The unification council elected Epiphanius Dumenko as its primate, previously the Metropolitan of Pereiaslav-Khmelnytskyi and Bila Tserkva (UOC-KP) in 2018.

Orthodox Ukrainians of the diaspora are subject to the jurisdiction of the Ecumenical Patriarchate of Constantinople.

==== Ukrainian Orthodox Church ====
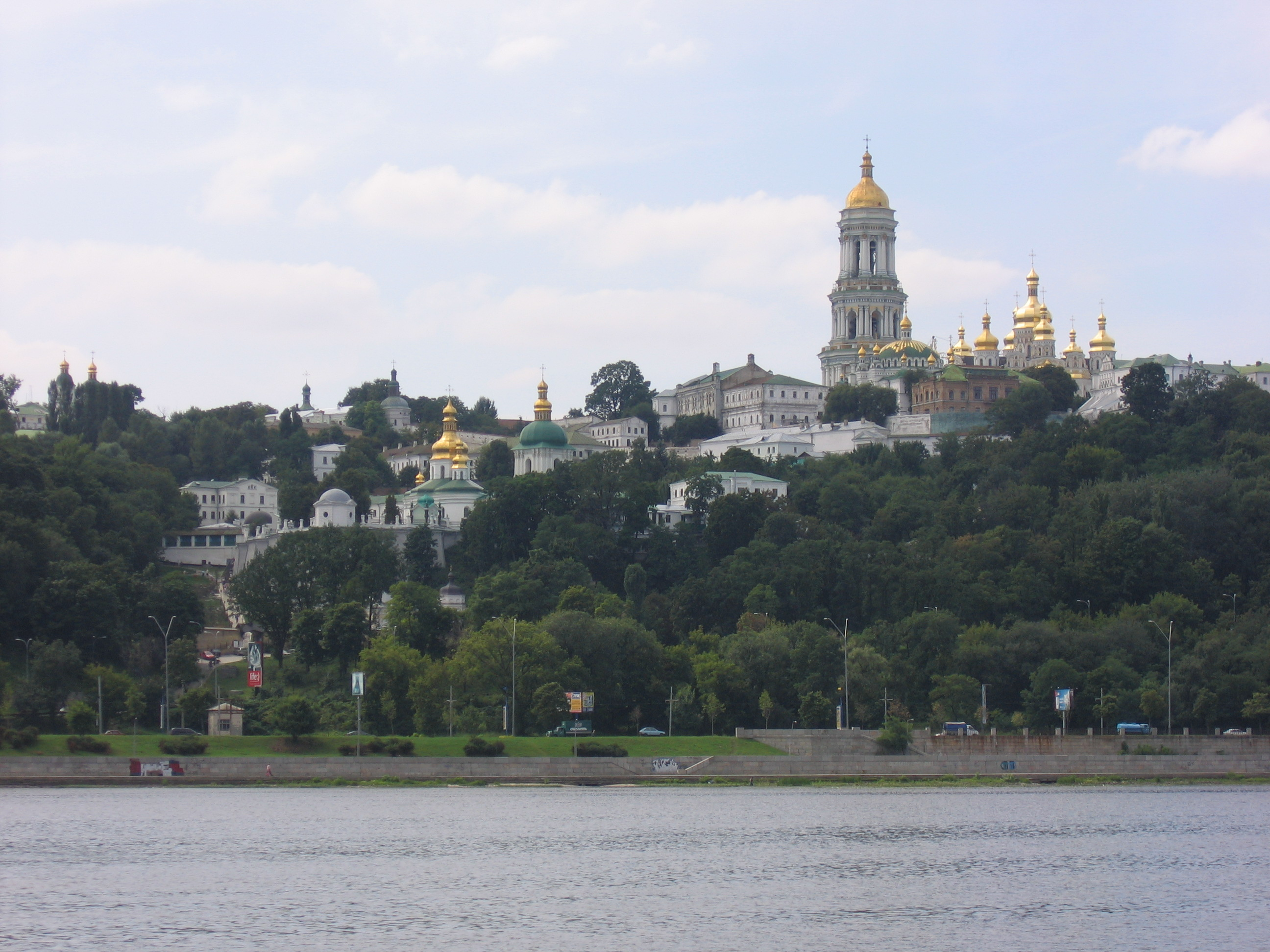
The Kyiv Pechersk Lavra of the UOC

The Ukrainian Orthodox Church (UOC), operates as an autonomous church that was formerly part of the Moscow Patriarchate until declaring its full independence in 2022. The head of the church is Metropolitan Onufriy who was enthroned in August 2014 as the "Metropolitan of Kyiv and all Ukraine". The UOC claims to be the largest religious body in Ukraine with the greatest number of parish churches and communities counting up to half of the total in Ukraine and totaling over 10 thousand. As of 2007, the UOC also claimed to have up to 75% of the Ukrainian population. Independent survey results, however, show significant variance, as many Orthodox Ukrainians do not clearly self-identify with a particular jurisdiction and, sometimes, are even unaware of the affiliation of the church they attend or the existence of the controversy itself. This makes it difficult to use survey numbers as an indicator of the relative strength of any given Church. Also, the geographical factor plays a major role in the number of adherents, as the Ukrainian population tends to be more churchgoing in the western part of the country rather than in the UOC's heartland in southern and eastern Ukraine.

Statistics on the number of parishes may be more reliable and consistent, even though they may not necessarily directly translate into the numbers of adherents. By number of parishes and quantity of church buildings, the UOC's strong base is central and north-western Ukraine. However, percentage wise (with respect to rival Orthodox Churches) its share of parishes there varies from 60 to 70 percent. At the same time, by percentage alone (with respect to rival Orthodox Churches) the UOC's share of church buildings peaks in the urban russophone southern and eastern Ukrainian provinces, being as high as 90%. The same can be said about Transcarpathia, although there the UOC's main rival is the Greek Catholic Church and thus its share of total church buildings is only 40%. The capital Kyiv is where the greatest Orthodox rivalry takes place, with the UOC holding about half of the Orthodox communities there. The only places where the UOC is a true minority, in both quantity, percentage and support are the former Galician provinces of Western Ukraine. There the total share of parishes does not exceed more than five percent.

On 27 May 2022, the Ukrainian Orthodox Church (UOC) formally cut ties and declared independence from the Russian Orthodox Church. Upon declaring its independence from the Moscow Patriarchate, the UOC began creating new parishes in Western Europe to serve Ukrainian refugees. By the end of 2022, 32 such parishes had been organized, and Bishop Veniamin (Voloshchuk) of Boyar was appointed to oversee the new diaspora parishes. One UOC parish exists in North America and predates the war: Nativity of the Blessed Virgin Mary, in Richmond Hill, Ontario, Canada.

==== Old Believers ====
Traditionally the Ukrainian clergy, following the annexation of Kyivan Metropolia, were one of the main sources of opposition to the Old Believer schism which took place at the time, under Patriarch Nikon. None of the Ukrainian parishes followed the Russian Orthodox Old-Rite Church. Although in 1905 the Tsar's decree on freedom of religion allowed the Old Believers church to reform, it gained little support in Ukraine. Presently, however the Old Believer community very much exploited the politicised schism in Ukrainian Orthodoxy and, as of 2004, number 53 communities scattered throughout Ukraine, with one of the biggest in Vylkove.

=== Catholic Church ===
==== Ukrainian Greek Catholic Church ====
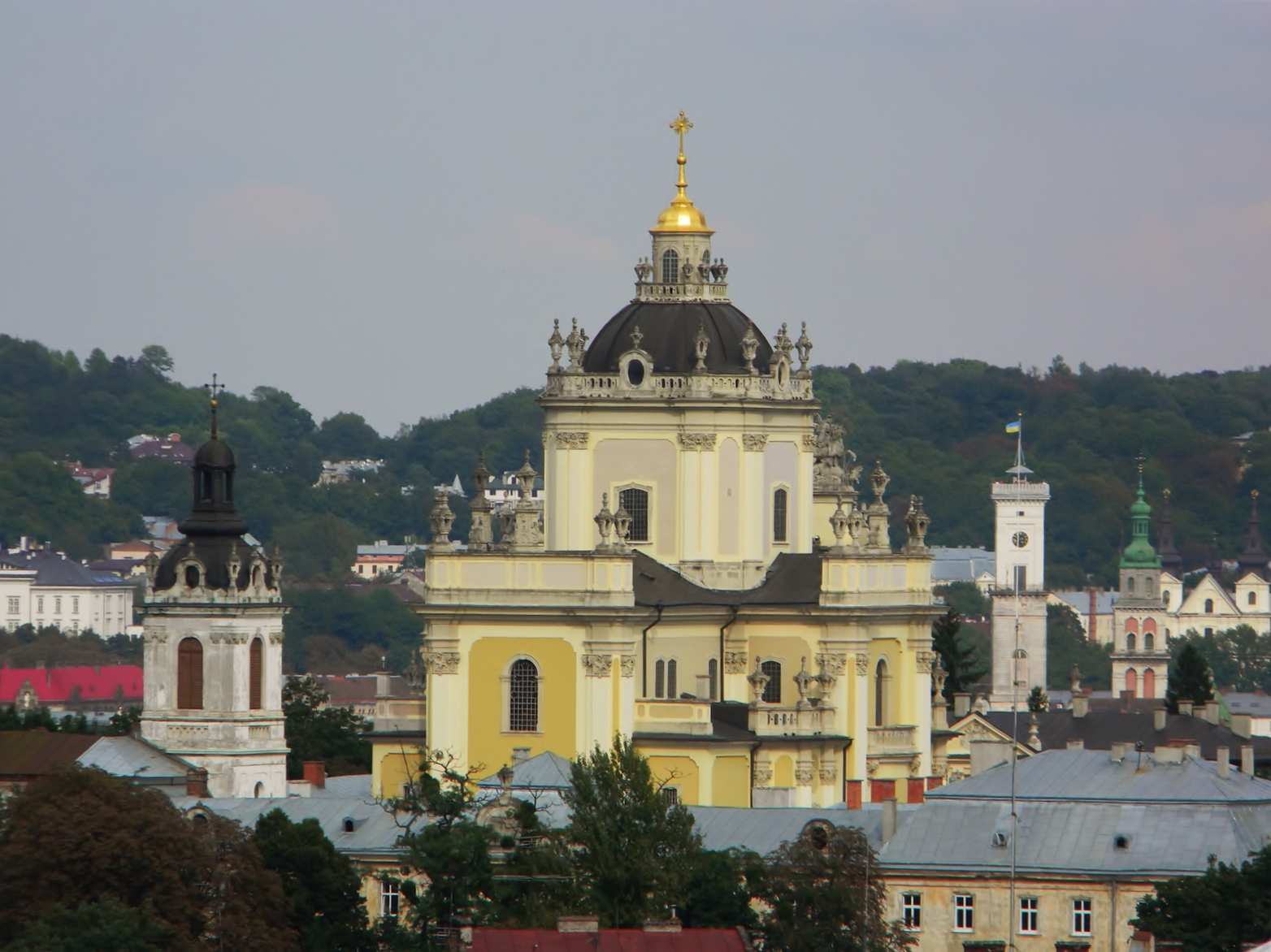
Although the St. George's Cathedral in Lviv is no longer the mother church of the UGCC, the Church's parish continues to be centered in Western Ukraine.

Abbreviated as the UGCC, and originally formed from the Union of Brest in 1596, the Church was outlawed by the Soviet government in 1948 but continued to exist in the Ukrainian underground and in the Western Ukrainian diaspora. It was officially re-established in Ukraine in 1989. In 1991, Cardinal Lubachivsky returned to Lviv from emigration. Since 2011 UGCC has been headed by Major Archbishop Sviatoslav Shevchuk.

Currently the Ukrainian Greek Catholic church has 3317 parishes which makes it the third largest denomination in Ukraine. Geographically, the Church's parishes were previously confined to the Western provinces of Lviv, Ternopil and Ivano-Frankivsk, where it has the most parishes of any Church and where its share of parishes ranges from 47% to 64%. The UGCC is also found in the neighboring Lemko areas in Poland. Numerous surveys conducted since the late 1990s consistently show that between 6% and 8% of Ukraine's population, or 9.4% to 12.6% of religious believers, identify themselves as belonging to this Church. In addition, the church has mass parishes abroad in the North American continent, South America, and Australia.

In recent times parishes have been established in many Eastern Ukrainian cities such as Kharkiv, Donetsk, in the south in Odesa and Yalta and also in Russia. with parishes being set up in Moscow, Novosibirsk, Ufa, Cheliabinsk, Tomsk, and other cities. These parishes have been formed primarily by resettled Ukrainians from Western Ukraine.

One of the largest religious controversies in Ukraine recently involved having the almost exclusively western Ukraine-based UGCC move its administrative centre from Lviv to Kyiv whilst its new cathedral's construction was sponsored by the first lady, Kateryna Yushchenko-Chumachenko. This move was criticised not only by the UOC(MP), but also by the whole Eastern Orthodox Communion.

==== Latin Church ====
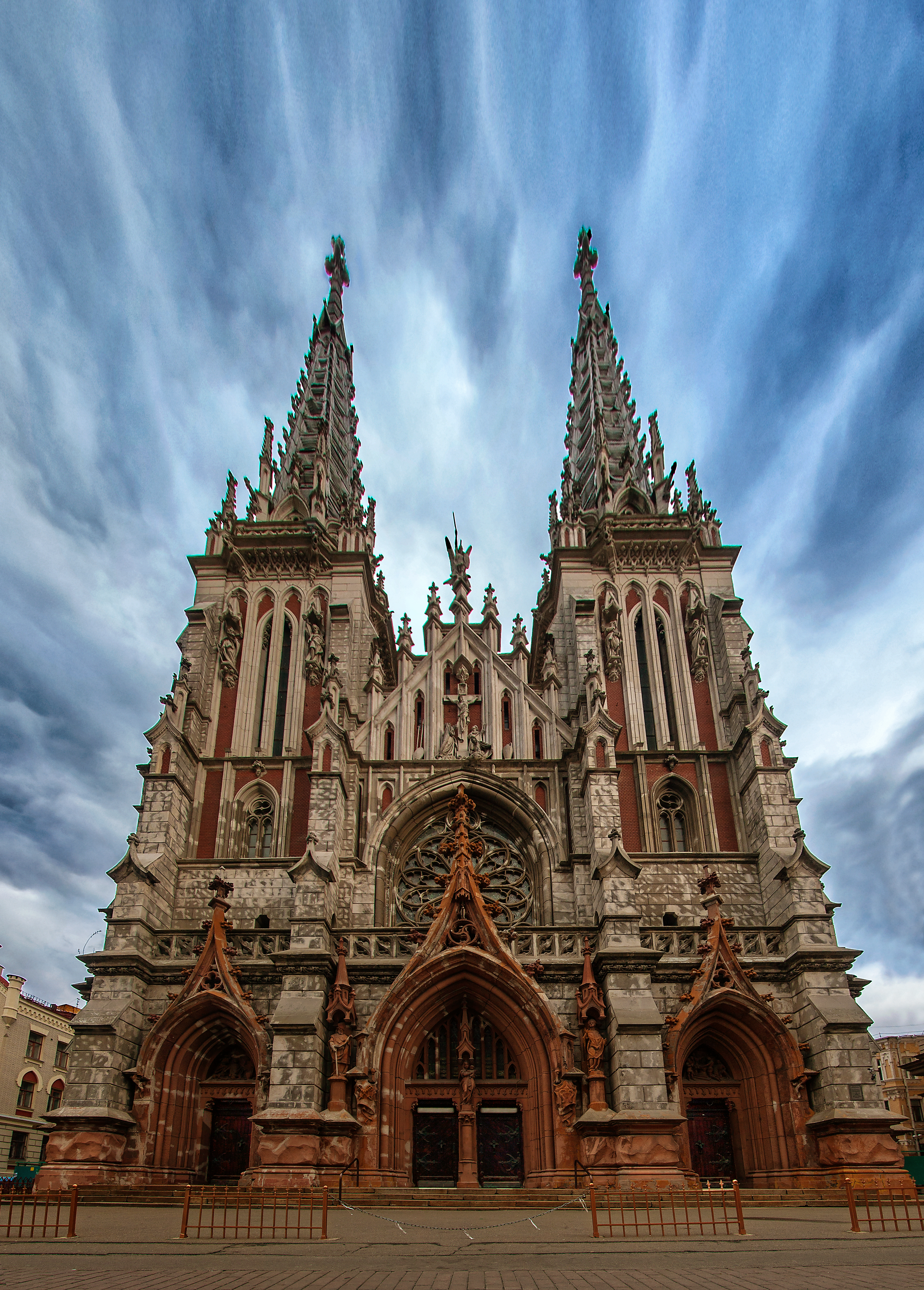
St. Nicholas Cathedral in Kyiv

The Latin Church in Ukraine is predominantly populated by non-Ukrainian minorities, in particular Poles and Hungarians. Originally holding a large number of parishes, most of the churches remained empty after World War II, which is attributed to the fact that much of the Polish population (once a significant minority, especially in the west of modern-day Ukraine) was killed in the war and the interethnic violence that occurred during the war as well as being subject to forcible evacuations and deportations.

After the restoration of Soviet power in Western Ukraine since 1944, many Catholic churches and monasteries were compulsorily closed and clergy persecuted.

In 1991, Pope John Paul II officially restored the activities of Catholic Dioceses in Ukraine and appointed bishops. Currently the Catholic Church in Ukraine has 807 parishes in 713 churches.

==== Ruthenian Greek Catholic Church ====
Following the dissolution of the Soviet Union, the Byzantine rite Catholic church in Transcarpathia emerged from the underground and was restored as a separate entity from the Ukrainian Greek Catholic Church based in Galicia, namely the Ruthenian Catholic Church. This was done despite the protests by a portion of the Church members led by the bishop of Khust who demanded to be integrated into the Ukrainian Greek Catholic Church. Despite this revival, unlike its sister Church in Galicia, the Ruthenian Byzantine rite Catholic Church has not regained its pre-war position as the dominant Church in Transcarpathia. It currently has about 23% of Transcarpathia's parishes, slightly less than 60% of the Orthodox total there. Its traditional base is the Rusyn (Ruthenian) ethnic minority in Transcarpathia.

=== Protestantism ===
In the 16th century small groups of Anabaptists appeared in Volodymyr-Volynskyi, but the influence of the Reformation in Ukraine remained marginal until three centuries later.

Protestantism arrived to Ukraine together with German immigrants in the 18th and 19th centuries. They were initially granted religious freedom by the Russian Imperial authorities, unlike the native population. While some were Catholic, the majority were either Evangelical (in North America known as Lutheran) or Mennonite (Anabaptist). Of the 200,000 or so Germans in Volhynia c.1900, some 90% or so were Lutheran. Lutheranism went into a major decline with the emigration of most of the Germans out of the region during the World Wars but there are still small remnants today (2006) in the Odesa and Kyiv regions.

One of earliest Protestant groups in Ukraine were Stundists (the name originated from the German Stunde, "hour") German Evangelical sect that spread from German villages in Bessarabia and Ekaterinoslav province to the neighbouring Ukrainian population. Protestantism in Ukraine rapidly grew during the liberal reforms of Alexander II in the 1860s. However, towards the end of the century authorities started to restrict Protestant proselytism of the Orthodox Christians, especially by the Stundists, routinely preventing prayer meetings and other activities. At the same time Baptists, another major Protestant group that was growing in Ukraine, were treated less harshly due to their powerful international connections.

In the early 20th century, Volyn became the main centre of the spread of Protestantism in Ukraine. During the Soviet period Protestantism, together with Orthodox Christianity, was persecuted in Ukraine, but the 1980s marked the start of another major expansion of Protestant proselytism in Ukraine.

Today the largest Protestant groups in Ukraine include Baptists (All-Ukrainian Union of the Association of Evangelical Baptists), Pentecostals (All-Ukrainian Union of Christians of the Evangelical Faith-Pentecostals), Seventh-day Adventists (Ukrainian Union Conference of Seventh-day Adventists) and a growing number of charismatic churches. Of note is the Hillsong Church in Kyiv. One of the most prominent Protestants in modern Ukraine is a practising Baptist pastor Oleksandr Turchynov, former head of the SBU, Ukraine's successor to the KGB. Despite recent rapid growth, Protestants in Ukraine still remain a small minority in a largely Orthodox Christian country.

== See also ==
- List of Patriarchs and Metropolitans of Ukraine
- Granting of autocephaly to the Orthodox Church of Ukraine
