= Shout to the Lord (album) =

Live album by Darlene Zschech, Hillsong
- Released: 1996
- Recorded: 1995
- Venue: The Hills Entertainment Centre, Sydney, Australia
- Genre: Praise & worship
- Length: 54:30
- Label: Integrity/Hosanna! Music
- Producer: Russell Fragar, Darlene Zschech

Hillsong Music Australia Hosanna! Music chronology
Shout to the Lord (1996)	Shout to the Lord 2000 (1998)

Shout to the Lord is the seventh recording project and fifth live Praise & Worship album by Hillsong Music. It was also the first of two albums released by Integrity Music under the Hosanna! Music label, and marked the beginning of a long relationship with Integrity Music that propelled Hillsong Music to the forefront of contemporary Praise & Worship Music in North America and around the world. The album reached No. 13 on the Billboard Top Contemporary Christian Albums Chart. Shout to the Lord was the first Hillsong Music album to officially feature Darlene Zschech as worship leader and the first album released by Integrity's Hosanna! Music to feature a female worship leader.

== Making of the album ==
Shout to the Lord was recorded live in 1995 at Hills Christian Life Centre (HCLC [now Hillsong Church]) in the Hills Entertainment Centre (which served as the church's primary venue until the completion of its first building in 1997). The album was recorded by Darlene Zschech and the Hillsong team.

Integrity Music began taking notice in the early 1990s of Hillsong Music's success in Australia and the UK. Songs written by members of the worship team at Hills Christian Life Centre were making their way around the world and had introduced a unique flavor to the worship styles of many churches. Geoff Bullock who served as worship pastor at HCLC had written many songs that were being recorded by other artists - particularly in the U.S.; and his songs were being released on projects by Maranatha! Music and Word Music Group's HeartCry Label. Additionally, Zschech's song "Shout to the Lord" was quickly making waves of its own and had also been recorded by Don Moen on the Hosanna! Music album, Rivers of Joy in 1995.

The album was not intended to be part of Hillsong's annual live album series (as it was recorded "mid-year" between Friends in High Places and God Is in the House), which primarily focuses on introducing new songs written during the previous year. Instead, Shout to the Lord included five songs previously recorded on other Hillsong albums with the intention of introducing a mostly American audience to the best of Hillsong Music. The arrangements were more polished than on previous recordings and better produced to meet the standards of a Hosanna! Music album.

Additionally, Zschech was not slated to be featured as worship leader on the project. Bullock had been worship pastor at HCLC for many years and his songs were well known around the world. However, only a few days before the live album recording, Bullock left the church and was no longer a part of the recording project. Zschech - who had served as Vocal Director and was a recognizable leader in the church's music department - was asked to step in as worship leader for the project. As a result, she made history as the first female worship leader on a Hosanna! Music album.

The style and sound of the album is heavily driven by both the vocal arrangements of Zschech and the Hillsong team, but also by the piano playing and musical direction of Russell Fragar. Fragar served as Music Director/Pastor at Hillsong Church in the 1990s and early 2000s and was instrumental in developing the sound that would quickly become associated with Hillsong Music. Fragar incorporated rhythms and harmonies that blended gospel with jazz, funk, rock and disco. Among others, notable musicians on the album included Mark Gregory (trumpet), David Moyse (electric guitar), Ian Fisher (bass), Craig Gower (keys/vocals), and vocalists Lucy Fisher, Donia Gondjou (Makedonez), Lisa Young, Robert Eastwood, Scott Haslem and Steve McPherson. Steve McPherson is not listed in the liner notes on the U.S. release, however, his name is listed on the UK and Australian versions and his vocals can clearly be heard in certain tracks.

Although Bullock did not take part in the actual album recording, it is evident that he would have been involved in the development process - as he only stepped down a few days prior to recording. The very fact that his songs were included on the album highlights how influential Bullock's songs and leadership were in the early days of Hillsong Music.

== Track listing ==
• 01. — "Let The Peace Of God Reign" (Darlene Zschech) — 05:24

• 02. — "I Believe The Promise" (Russell Fragar) — 04:41

• 03. — "People Just Like Us" (Fragar) — 04:29

• 04. — "Jesus, Jesus" (Geoff Bullock) — 04:30

• 05. — "I Will Never Be" (Bullock) – 04:16

• 06. — "Jesus, Lover Of My Soul" (John Ezzy, Daniel Grul, Stephen McPherson) — 03:37

• 07. — "Show Me Your Ways" (Fragar) — 04:57

• 08. "All The Power You Need (He's Real)" (Fragar) — 03:35

• 09. — "Power Of Your Love" (Bullock) — 05:02

• 10. — "This Kingdom" (Bullock) — 05:02

• 11. — "Father Of Creation" (Robert Eastwood) — 03:37

• 12. — "Shout To The Lord" (Zschech) — 04:40
