= Mountain song =

Mountain song may refer to:

- Shan'ge Chinese mountain song
  - Hakka hill song one of the subgenres of the Chinese mountain song
- Mountain Song, composition by composer Ma Sicong
- Mountain Song, composition by composer Ned Rorem
- Mountain Song (film), 2019 Indonesian drama film
- "Mountain Song" (Jane's Addiction song)
- "Mountain Song", song by Joe Satriani from the 2002 album Strange Beautiful Music
- "The Mountain Song", song by John Denver from the 1980 album Autograph

== See also ==
- Hillsong (disambiguation)
