= Hillsong Conference =

Annual Christian conference in Sydney, Australia

- Hillsong Conference 2025 logo

- Genre: Christian
- Locations: Hillsong Convention Center, 1-9 Solent Circuit, Norwest 2153 Sydney, Australia
- Coordinates: 33.8443°S 151.0621°E
- Country: Australia & United Kingdom
- Years active: 40
- Inaugurated: 1986
- Previous event: 9 – 11 July 2024
- Next event: 8 – 10 July 2025
- Attendance: 3,000+
- Website: hillsong.com/conference

Hillsong Conference is a mid-year annual Christian conference hosted in Sydney, Australia, with a three-day event held in London later each year. It was claimed to be the largest annual conference in Australia of any kind. The event is hosted by Hillsong Church at their convention center in Norwest.

Hillsong Conference grew from 150 people at the first conference in 1986 to upwards of 30,000 people each year in Sydney. It brings in over $28 million to the New South Wales tourism sector, annually.

From 2020 to 2021, the Hillsong Conference was postponed for the first time in its history, due to the COVID-19 pandemic.

== History ==
=== 1986–1994: Early Years ===
The first Hillsong Conference was held in 1986 in Baulkham Hills with only 150 attendees. In the early 1990s, night rallies were held in the Hills Centre where Hillsong Church was holding meetings, with attendees growing to as large as 750 by 1992.

=== 1995–2000: Growth ===
From 1995, night rallies were held at the State Sports Centre in Sydney Olympic Park. Two similar conferences were held in 1999 and 2000 across two weeks.

=== 2001–2017: Move to Sydney Olympic Park ===
Hillsong Conference was first held in the Qudos Bank Arena (formerly Sydney SuperDome and named Acer Arena at the time) and various venues throughout Sydney Olympic Park from 2001.

In 2011 Hillsong Conference was not held in Sydney Olympic Park but instead in the Sydney Entertainment Centre for logistical reasons relating to the availability of Sydney Olympic Park.

The 2015 conference was marred with controversy when American pastor Mark Driscoll was invited to speak. A Melbourne based activist Benjamin Ady and his Wife Megan initiated a number of peaceful protests at Hillsong's Sydney and Melbourne campuses and from conversations with their church leaders was confident Mark would be disinvited. Prominent journalist Julia Baird covered the story that also noted a number of Christian leaders alarmed that Mark Driscoll's invitation was still offered.

Though Mark Driscoll was not physically in attendance at the conference, a pre-recorded video was aired instead.

At the same 2015 conference Tanya Levin was arrested by Police Officers contracted to patrol the conference site for trespass. She was later charged however the case was dismissed in court.

Also in 2015, UK gender church abuse activist Natalie Collins stage a peaceful protest at the London Hillsong conference in response to Mark Driscoll's invitation to speak.

=== 2018–present ===
In 2018, the Hillsong Conference completely sold out the Qudos Bank Arena venue. Future growth is expected to continue to overflow into the wider Sydney Olympic Park precinct where currently the Kidsong and Hillsong Young & Free Conference is held simultaneously.

The 2020 and 2021 Hillsong Conferences were postponed for the first time in its history due to the COVID-19 global pandemic.

== Conferences ==
=== Hillsong Conference Sydney ===
Hillsong Conference was first held in the Qudos Bank Arena (formerly Sydney SuperDome and named Acer Arena and Allphones Arena at the time) and various venues throughout Sydney Olympic Park from 2001.

=== Hillsong Conference London ===
In 2006, an offshoot of Hillsong Conference began in London with 3,000 people at the ExCeL Exhibition Centre known as Hillsong Conference Europe. Since its inception in 2007 it has become an annual 3-day conference held in London attracting people from across Europe.

Hillsong Conference London is now held at The O2 Arena, which is the second largest indoor venue in the UK of 21,000 seats.

=== Hillsong Conference New York ===
In July 2012, Brian Houston announced they will be bringing the Hillsong Conference for the first time ever to the United States. Hillsong Conference was held in New York in 2013 for the first time, and annually since.

Hillsong Conference New York was held in the Barclays Center in Brooklyn, with a seating capacity of 17,000.

== Sessions ==
The sessions that make up Hillsong Conference are diverse and vary from a typical church service, from presentations from leaders in their space, traditional preaching and worship sessions, through to Design and Production masterclasses.

- Opening Ceremony
- Morning/Night Meetings - Hillsong Church Service with special guest preachers
- Masterclasses - One hour presentations in more intimate settings with experts across a wide breadth of topics.
- Closing Ceremony

== Kidsong ==
Kidsong is the Children's portion of the Hillsong Conference, and is hosted simultaneously to Hillsong Conference in the surrounding Olympic Park Precinct. Kidsong also runs a special programme named Treasure Chest for children living with disabilities.

== Charitable contributions ==
Various charities are present at Hillsong Conference, including Compassion and Open Doors.

In 2019, over a 20-year partnership with Hillsong, Compassion announced that over 100,000 children had been sponsored through their programs.

== Accessibility ==
The conference, including worship, is translated live into 11 different languages, plus Auslan, for those attending.

The venue and surrounding precinct is wheelchair accessible and Hillsong Conference makes specific provisions for those who require additional assistance.

== Notable appearances ==
Australian Prime Minister Scott Morrison speaking at Hillsong Conference 2019

In 2005, Leader of the Australian Labor Party Kim Beazley sent a video message and NSW Premier Bob Carr spoke briefly at the conference.

In 2015 singer Justin Bieber attended the Sydney conference.

In 2016, singer Dami Im performed her Eurovision hit Sound of Silence at the conference.

In 2019, Prime Minister of Australia Scott Morrison opened the Hillsong Conference with a prayer for veterans, young people and more rain to tackle the now lifted drought facing Australia.

== See also ==
- Hillsong Church
- Hillsong Channel
- Charismatic movement
- Pentecostalism
