= Rowan Hillson =

British physician

Rowan Hillson MBE FRCP
- Born: 1951 (age 74–75)
- Education: University of Birmingham
- Occupations: Consultant physician, author
- Known for: National Clinical Director for Diabetes, Department of Health (2008-2013)
- Medical career
- Sub-specialties: diabetes, endocrinology
- Awards: Hospital Doctor of the Year, Diabetes Award (1997)

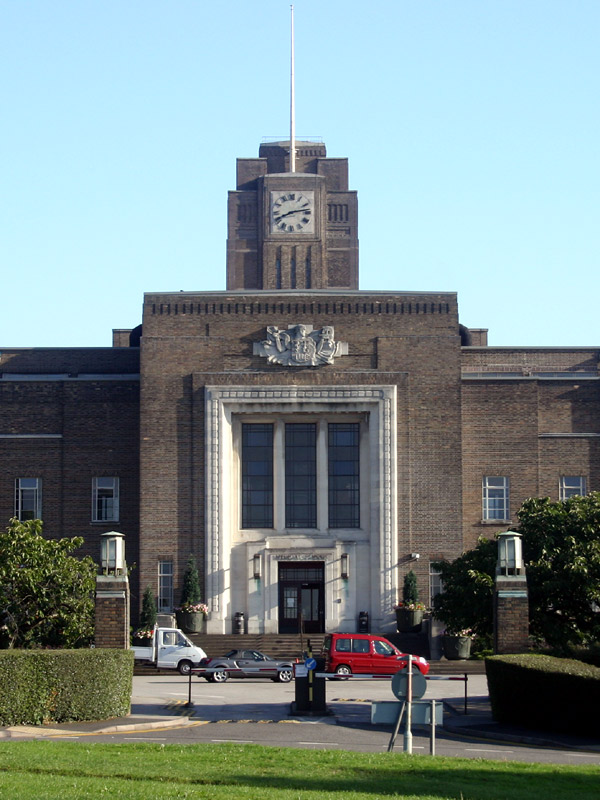
Birmingham University Medical School

Rowan Mary Hillson MBE FRCP (born 1951) is a British endocrinologist who established a pioneering diabetes service at Hillingdon Hospital, and was National Clinical Director for Diabetes at the Department of Health. She is the author of several books on diabetes and endocrinology.

== Biography ==
Hillson studied medicine at the University of Birmingham, graduating with an MB ChB in 1974. She practiced at Birmingham, Liverpool and Oxford before joining Hillingdon Hospital in 1989, where she worked until 2012. During her time as Consultant Physician, Diabetes and Endocrinology at the hospital she developed the Diabetes and Endocrine Unit. As a result of the work of the Unit she and her team won the Hospital Doctor of the Year Diabetes Award in 1997. She was honorary Consultant Physician at the hospital from 2012 to 2013.

Hillson was the National Clinical Director for Diabetes ('the Diabetes Tsar') at the Department of Health from 2008 to 2013. While in this role she established the National Diabetes Information Service.

Hillson was appointed a Member of the Order of the British Empire (MBE) in 2006 for contributions to medicine and healthcare. She was awarded the honorary degree of Doctor of Science (DSc) from Brunel University in 2011 in recognition of her services to medicine and healthcare.

The Joint British Diabetes Societies for Inpatient Care established the Rowan Hillson Insulin Safety Award to promote excellent practice in insulin safety. In 2006 Hilson was elected to the national committee of the Association of British Clinical Diabetologists.

== Selected publications ==
- Diabetes care : a practical manual, Oxford University Press. (2015) ISBN 9780198705635
- Five years on : delivering the Diabetes National Service Framework. COI for the Department of Health (2008).
- The complete guide : the essential introduction to managing diabetes. Vermillion. (2001). ISBN 9780091827014
- Late onset diabetes : a practical guide to managing diabetes over 40. Vermillion. (1996). ISBN 9780091814069
- Diabetes : a beyond basics guide, Optima. (1992). ISBN 9780356205649
