= Tanya Levin =

Australian social worker and writer (born 1971)

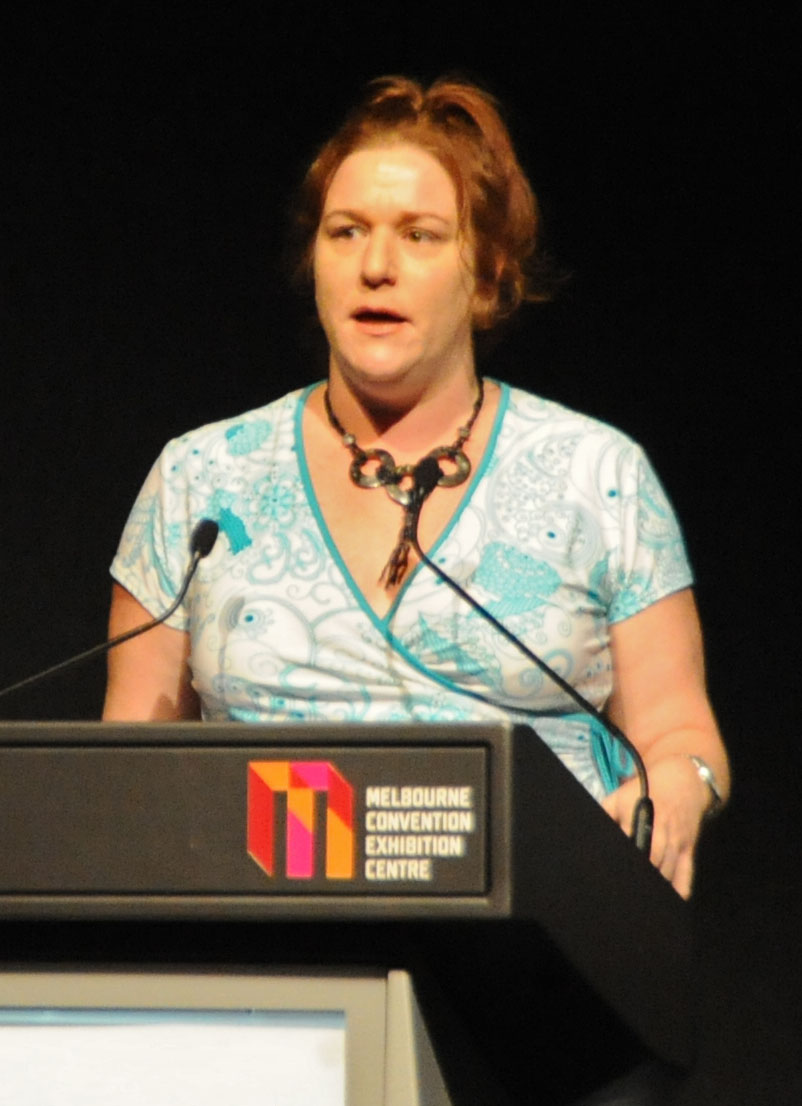
- Levin speaking at the 2010 Global Atheist Convention
- Born: 25 August 1971 (age 55); Durban, South Africa
- Occupations: Social worker, writer
- Website: www.tanyalevin.com

Tanya Levin (born 25 August 1971) is an Australian social worker and writer. A former Hillsong Church member, she has described herself as a feminist and an atheist since at least 2010.

Levin has published two books. People In Glass Houses (2007), is an exposé of the Hillsong Church, in which Levin was raised. It was short-listed for the 2007 Walkley Non-fiction Book Award. Crimwife (2012), is about her relationship with a criminal. She is also the host of the 2021 podcast Leaving Hillsong, which interviews people who have left the Hillsong Church, and also Reading Hillsong, also released in 2021.

== Arrest ==
On 1 July 2015, Levin was arrested for trespass during an interview, after failing to "move on" from Hillsong Conference in Sydney Olympic Park at the direction of police. The arrest came amid increased media scrutiny of the conference, after organisers misled the media about the involvement of Mark Driscoll. According to Levin, she was convicted but on appeal "the findings were upheld, but the convictions were dismissed."

== Bibliography ==
- People in Glass Houses: An Insider's Story of a Life in and out of Hillsong (2007)
- Crimwife: An Insider's Account of Love behind Bars (2012)
