= Kilson (footballer) =

São Toméan footballer

Personal information
- Full name: Wilson Leal Dos Ramos
- Date of birth: 24 February 1983 (age 43)
- Position: Midfielder

Team information
- Current team: Praia Cruz

Senior career*
Years	Team	Apps	(Gls)
- Praia Cruz

International career^{‡}
2015–	São Tomé and Príncipe	2	(0)
- * Club domestic league appearances and goals ‡ National team caps and goals as of 24 March 2018

Wilson Leal Dos Ramos (born 24 February 1983), commonly known as Kilson, is a São Toméan footballer who plays as a midfielder for Sporting Praia Cruz and the São Tomé and Príncipe national team.

== International career ==
Kilson made his international debut for São Tomé and Príncipe in 2015.
