= Hillsong =

Hillsong may refer to:

== Churches ==
- Hillsong Church, a church in Sydney, New South Wales, Australia and global headquarters
  - Hillsong Brisbane
  - Hillsong Church Kyiv
  - Hillsong NYC
  - Hillsong Church UK

== Music ==
- Hillsong musicians
- Hillsong Global Project, musical project by Hillsong Music Australia working with various Hillsong Church campuses around the world
- Hillsong Music Australia, music produced by Hillsong Church
- Hillsong United, Australian band that originated as a part of Hillsong Church, formed in 1998
  - Hillsong United: Live in Miami, eleventh live album/DVD by contemporary Christian worship band Hillsong United
- Hillsong Young & Free, Australian contemporary worship music group from Sydney, Australia, where they started making Christian music in 2012
- Hillsong Worship, Australian band that originated as a part of Hillsong Church, formed in 1983

== Television ==
- Hillsong Channel, an American and Australian Christian-based broadcast television network

== Others ==
- Hillsong International Leadership College, in Baulkham Hills, New South Wales, Australia
- Hillsong: Let Hope Rise, a 2016 documentary about Hillsong United
- Shan'ge, Chinese hill songs

== See also ==
- Mountain song (disambiguation)
