= Pilson =

Pilson is a surname. Notable people with the surname include:

- Jeff Pilson (born 1959), American musician
- Neal Pilson (born 1940), American television executive

== See also ==
- Hilson
