= Hillsong Ukraine =

Coordinates: 50°26′53.25″N 30°30′48.23″E

- Hillsong Church Ukraine
- Hillsong Ukraine
- Country: Ukraine
- Denomination: Hillsong Church
- Website: hillsong.com.ua

History
- Founded: October 1992

Clergy
- Pastor(s): Yuriy Ravnushkin and Nataliia Ravnushkin

Hillsong Ukraine, also known as Hillsong Church Kyiv (formerly Kyiv Christian Life Centre) is an offshoot of Hillsong Church from Sydney, Australia, based in Kyiv, Ukraine.

== History ==
Praise and worship during the opening night of Hillsong Conference in Kyiv, 2006

Hills Christian Life Centre was founded by Brian Houston in 1983 in Baulkham Hills (an outer suburb of Sydney), New South Wales, Australia, later (2001) renamed as Hillsong Church.

In September 1992, an outreach began in the October Palace, Kyiv. Australian worship leader David Evans, US pastor Mike Berry and former Hillsong youth pastor Darko Culjak officially began the church in a 700-seat movie theatre in downtown Kyiv. The establishment of the church was aided by Pat Robertson's Christian Broadcasting Network operating in the former Soviet Union. Culjak became the first senior minister and established the Kyiv Christian Life Centre officially on 4 October 1992. Hillsong Kyiv was thus established a year after Ukraine obtained its independence from the Soviet Union. Hillsong sent some financial support, and the church was named Hillsong, although it was always independent of the Sydney organisation.

On 1 June 1997, Ievgenii (Zhenya) and Vera Kasevich became the new pastors of the church, and led the church and its offshoot in Moscow for about 20 years, successfully building up the congregation by 2008. As of 2007, the church held six to seven services each weekend with a combined attendance of around 3000. The Kasevichs were invited to speak at various churches and Christian conferences around the globe. The church budget was around $1 million a year, all from donations, but Hillsong made the Kasevichs pay up to $13,000 for first-class air tickets to fly speakers to a conference in Kyiv.

Hillsong Kyiv did not initially own a worship centre, renting an exhibition marquee in industrial outskirts of Kyiv for its services, but purchased two offices in 2002 and 2007 on credit.

In February 2014, the Kasevichs wanted the Kyiv church to retain its independence, but Brian Houston said that if they broke away, he would open a rival Hillsong church in the city. They felt they had no choice but to hand over the churches and assets and resign, as they did not want to break up the congregation. Hillsong records later showed that Hillsong Church requested a "voluntary donation" of the proceeds of the sale of a property, as well as over $US230,000 in cash. The Kasevichs wanted to emigrate to the United States, and there is evidence that Hillsong said that they could make things difficult for the couple with the American authorities, although Houston later denied this.

After their departure, the Kasevichs were banned from church events and therefore from the congregation (their "family"), and their emails and online connection to the Hillsong database were cut. They were asked to sign a non-disclosure agreement which excluded them from attending services at Hillsong Kyiv or Moscow, and from contacting any of Hillsong's staff or volunteers.

Yuri and Tanya Ravnushkin became lead pastors of the church, which is or was located on the outskirts of the city.

In March 2022, Brian Houston resigned from the board of Hillsong Church Sydney and from his role as global senior pastor as a result of breaching the moral code of the church in his behaviour with two women, and Phil and Lucinda Dooley took over both roles.

=== Hillsong Moscow ===
In early 2007, after three years of preparation, Hillsong Kyiv launched its first service in Moscow, with subsequent large services, attended both by interested Christians from other churches and new people, held in April and May. From summer 2007 Hillsong Moscow held services in the Stas Namin Theatre, in the city centre near Gorky Park. In June 2007, the church successfully completed the registration process. The church plant was cooperatively supported by the Moscow-based Good News Church pastored by Rick Renner.

The church in Moscow was pastored by Kyiv pastors Zhenya and Vera Kasevich until their departure in 2014. As of 2015, Hillsong Moscow was led by Vadim Feshchenko, and the two churches were on friendly terms, despite the conflict between the two countries.

== Ministries ==
Hillsong Kyiv aligned its structure with that of Sydney Hillsong. As of 2007 there were three-part courses for new believers, named "Discovery". "Connect groups" and sometimes special services were held for people of various ages and with various interests, such as youth, or "people over 40", or those who like fishing or computers. Hillsong Kyiv is characterised by a high level of involvement of its members in serving at the church and in 2017 was assessed by researchers as having the best level of the organisation of ministry among all Protestant churches in Europe.

=== Conferences ===
As both Hillsong Church in Sydney and London, Hillsong Kyiv holds three yearly conferences: the Hillsong Conference, the Colour Your World conference for women, and a men's conference. The Hillsong Conference, meant to equip other churches with both Biblical teaching and practical advice on organising the life of a church, gathered about 3000 delegates from more than 250 churches from 12 countries, mainly representing the former Soviet bloc, in 2006.

The Colour conference was cancelled in 2014 owing to the Russo-Ukrainian war. In July 2014, at Hillsong's major conference in Sydney, Kyiv lead pastor Yuriy Ravnushkin spoke about the difficulties of keeping the church going during those times.

=== Social work ===
The church has a history of helping orphanages in Kyiv and nearby, supporting sick people in hospitals treating cancer, reaching out to homeless children and inmates in correctional centres. In 2015 Tanya Ravnushkin reported that they had "started to do a whole lot more outside our doors", and refugee children had been accepted into the church and into the homes of members.

=== Bible college ===
The church has a Bible college, meant mainly for those who wish to serve in the church. Students from Protestant churches of other cities of Ukraine as well as other former Soviet bloc countries also come for training.

== Music ==
Hillsong Kyiv has recorded many albums, including youth and children's albums. The songs were initially translations of the songs written at Hillsong Church in Sydney Hillsong London, but there are also original songs written mainly by Vera Kasevich, who served as the church's worship pastor, and her and Zhenya's son Roman Kasevich.

== Criticism ==
The criticism of the Hillsong Church Kyiv is similar to the criticism expressed with regard to the mother church in Australia and reflects the general disapproval of certain aspects of what Pentecostals/charismatics believe in, often from the more traditional Protestant denominations. In particular, the teaching on prosperity is the target of attacks. However, according to Zhenya Kasevich, he would not "go to the extremes" when teaching prosperity believing that "we are blessed (only) to be a blessing to others".

In April 2022, speaking from their new home in the U.S., former pastors Zhenya and Vera Kasevich criticised the way that Hillsong Australia's general manager George Aghajanian had forced them to hand over the church and assets to the global organisation in 2014, and accused Hillsong of wanting to add it to their property portfolio.
