= Chris Tomlin discography =

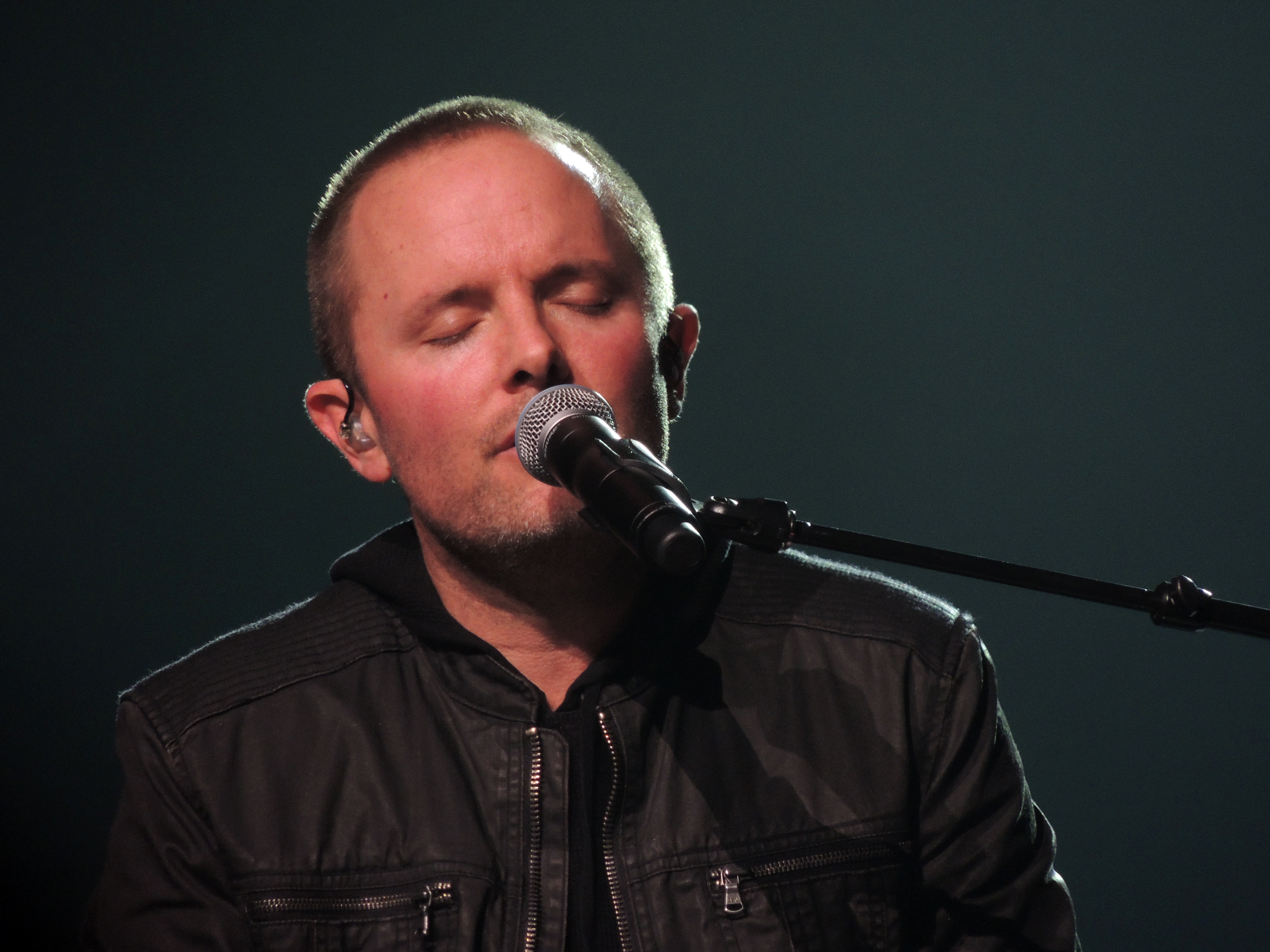
- Studio albums: 12
- Live albums: 3
- Compilation albums: 1
- Singles: 28
- Independent albums: 3

American contemporary Christian music artist Chris Tomlin has released 12 studio albums, three independent albums, two live albums, one compilation album, and 21 singles.

Starting with his first commercial album release of The Noise We Make and gaining momentum with his studio album Arriving, Chris Tomlin has quickly become one of the most recognized singer/songwriters and activists within contemporary Christian music industry. His music is considered among the most sung with his music being sung in over 3.12 million churches worldwide. He was awarded Male Vocalist of the Year at the 2006, 2007 (along with Artist of the Year) and 2008 GMA Dove Awards and a Grammy Award for Best Contemporary Christian Music Album in 2012. He has sold more than 4.2 million albums and has over 6 million digital downloads.

His album in 2013 titled Burning Lights debuted at No. 1 on the Billboard 200 charts, becoming the fourth contemporary Christian music album in history to do so. His third studio album Arriving has been certified Platinum as well as his singles "Our God" and "How Great Is Our God".

== Albums ==
=== Studio albums ===
Title	Album details	Peak chart positions								Certifications (sales threshold)
Title	Album details	US	US Christ	US Count	CAN	NZ	UK Down	UK Indie	UK C&G	Certifications (sales threshold)
Inside Your Love	Released: February 13, 1995; Label: Independent; Format: CD	—	—	—	—	—	—	—	—	
Authentic	Released: September 1, 1998; Label: Independent; Format: CD	—	—	—	—	—	—	—	—	
The Noise We Make	Released: March 1, 2001; Label: Sparrow Records/sixstepsrecords; Formats: CD, digital download, streaming	—	—	—	—	—	—	—	—	
Not to Us	Released: August 29, 2002; Label: Sparrow/sixstepsrecords; Formats: CD, digital download, streaming	161	13	—	—	—	—	—	—	
Arriving	Released: September 21, 2004; Label: Sparrow/sixstepsrecords; Formats: CD, digital download, streaming	39	6	—	—	—	—	—	—	RIAA: Platinum
See the Morning	Released: September 26, 2006; Label: Sparrow/sixstepsrecords; Formats: CD, digital download, streaming	15	1	—	—	—	—	—	—	RIAA: Platinum
Hello Love	Released: September 2, 2008; Label: sixstepsrecords; Formats: CD, digital download, streaming	9	4	—	—	—	—	—	—	RIAA: Gold
And If Our God Is for Us...	Released: November 16, 2010; Label: sixstepsrecords; Formats: CD, digital download, streaming	17	1	—	—	13	—	—	—	RIAA: Gold
Burning Lights	Released: January 8, 2013; Label: sixstepsrecords; Formats: CD, digital download, streaming	1	1	—	25	—	—	—	4	RIAA: Gold
Love Ran Red	Released: October 27, 2014; Label: sixstepsrecords; Formats: CD, digital download, streaming	8	1	—	—	—	94	—	2	
Never Lose Sight	Released: October 21, 2016; Label: sixstepsrecords; Formats: CD, digital download, streaming	6	1	—	64	—	76	11	2	RIAA: Gold
Holy Roar	Released: October 26, 2018; Label: sixstepsrecords; Formats: CD, digital download, streaming	103	3	—	—	—	—	—	8	
Chris Tomlin & Friends	Released: July 31, 2020; Label: Sparrow/Capitol CMG; Formats: CD, digital download, streaming, LP	60	1	6	—	—	—	—	6	
Always	Released: September 9, 2022; Label: Sparrow/Capitol CMG; Formats: CD, digital download, streaming	— (Note: Always did not enter the Billboard 200, but peaked at No. 23 on the Billboard Top Album Sales)	2	—	—	—	—	—	11	
The King Is Still the King	Released: September 26, 2025; Label: Evergreen Music/Capitol CMG; Formats: CD, LP, digital download, streaming	— (Note: The King Is Still the King did not enter the Billboard 200, but peaked at No. 41 on the Top Album Sales and No. 36 on the Top Current Album Sales)	8	—	—	—	42	—	12	
"—" denotes a recording that did not chart

=== Live albums ===
Title	Details	Peak chart positions			Certifications
Title	Details	US	US Christ	AUS	Certifications
Live from Austin Music Hall	Released: December 27, 2005; Label: Sparrow/sixstepsrecords	—	11	—	
Glory in the Highest: Christmas Songs of Worship	Released: October 6, 2009; Label: Sparrow/sixstepsrecords	19	2	—	RIAA: Gold
Adore: Christmas Songs of Worship	Released: October 23, 2015; Label: sixstepsrecords	17	1	89	
Holy Roar: Live from Church	Released: March 15, 2019; Label: sixstepsrecords	— (Note: Holy Roar: Live from Church did not enter the Billboard 200, but peaked at No. 31 on the Top Album Sales chart.)	7	—	
Emmanuel: Christmas Songs of Worship	Released: September 24, 2021; Label: Sparrow	—	4	—	
Good News of Great Joy: Christmas Songs of Worship	Released: November 6, 2026; Label: Evergreen Music/Capitol CMG	—	41	—	
"—" denotes releases that did not chart.

=== Compilation albums ===
Title	Details	Peak chart positions		Certifications
Title	Details	US	US Christ	Certifications
The Early Years	Released: November 21, 2006; Label: sixstepsrecords	—	—	
How Great Is Our God: The Essential Collection	Released: November 11, 2011; Label: Sparrow/sixstepsrecords	40	2	RIAA: Gold
Christmas Gift Pack	Released: November 6, 2012; Label: Sparrow/sixstepsrecords	196	11	
3 CD Collection	Released: July 17, 2015; Label: Capitol CMG	—	—	
The Ultimate Christmas Playlist	Released: December 1, 2017; Label: Sparrow/sixstepsrecords	—	—	
"—" denotes releases that did not chart.

=== Extended plays ===
Title	Details	Peak chart positions	Certifications
Title	Details	US Christ	Certifications
Made to Worship	Release date: August 29, 2006; Label: sixstepsrecords	—	
Nobody Loves Me Like You	Release date: August 17, 2018; Label: sixstepsrecords	20	
Is He Worthy?	Release date: February 1, 2019; Label: sixstepsrecords	—	
Christmas Day: Christmas Songs of Worship	Release date: November 15, 2019; Label: Capitol/sixstepsrecords	—	
Miracle of Love: Christmas Songs of Worship	Release date: October 9, 2020; Label: Capitol/sixstepsrecords	—	
Holy Forever: Christmas Songs of Worship	Release date: November 7, 2025; Label: Evergreen Music LP, Capitol CMG	—	
Jesus Saves	Release date: January 9, 2026; Label: Evergreen Music, Capitol CMG	—	
"—" denotes releases that did not chart.

=== Independent albums ===
Title	Details	Peak chart positions		Certifications
Title	Details	US	US Christ	Certifications
Too Much Free Time (with Ross King)	Released: November 13, 1998; Label: Independent	—	—	
"—" denotes releases that did not chart.

== Singles ==
Year	Title	Peak chart positions					Certifications	Album
Year	Title	US Bub.	US Christ.	US Christ. Airplay	US Christ. AC	US Christ. Digital	Certifications	Album
2001	"Forever"	—	—		—	49		The Noise We Make
2002	"Enough"	—	—		—	—		Not to Us
2003	"Famous One"	—	40		—	—		Not to Us
2004	"Indescribable"	—	3		2	32	RIAA: Platinum	Arriving
2005	"Holy Is the Lord"	—	2		1	41	RIAA: Gold	Arriving
2005	"The Way I Was Made"	—	—		17	—		Arriving
2005	"How Great Is Our God"	—	1		1	2	RIAA: 2× Platinum; RMNZ: Gold	Arriving
2006	"Made to Worship"	—	1		1	—		See the Morning
2007	"How Can I Keep from Singing?"	—	4		4	—		See the Morning
2007	"Amazing Grace (My Chains Are Gone)"	—	2		2	13	RIAA: 2× Platinum; RMNZ: Gold	See the Morning
2008	"Jesus Messiah"	—	3		2	29	RIAA: Gold	Hello Love
2009	"I Will Rise"	—	4		2	9	RIAA: Platinum	Hello Love
2009	"Sing, Sing, Sing"	—	6		7	28		Hello Love
2009	"God of This City"	—	28		30	24		Hello Love
2010	"Our God"	3	1		1	1	RIAA: 2× Platinum; RMNZ: Gold	And If Our God Is for Us...
2010	"I Will Follow"	11	2		2	1	RIAA: Platinum	And If Our God Is for Us...
2011	"I Lift My Hands"	—	1		4	11	RIAA: Gold	And If Our God Is for Us...
2011	"How Great Is Our God (World Edition)"	—	38		—	29		How Great Is Our God: The Essential Collection
2012	"Whom Shall I Fear (God of Angel Armies)"	11	1		1	1	RIAA: Platinum	Burning Lights
2013	"God's Great Dance Floor"	—	9		9	15		Burning Lights
2014	"Waterfall"	—	8	10	16	2		Love Ran Red
2014	"Jesus Loves Me"	—	6	1	3	3		Love Ran Red
2015	"At the Cross (Love Ran Red)"	—	5	1	2	5	RIAA: Platinum	Love Ran Red
2015	"Good Good Father"	13	1	1	5	1	RIAA: 2× Platinum; RMNZ: Platinum	Never Lose Sight
2015	"He Shall Reign Forevermore"	—	8	7	1	26		Adore: Christmas Songs of Worship
2016	"Jesus"	—	4	2	2	3		Never Lose Sight
2017	"Home"	—	4	1	2	3	RIAA: Gold	Never Lose Sight
2017	"Noel" (featuring Lauren Daigle)	—	4	5	1	2	RIAA: Gold	Adore: Christmas Songs of Worship
2018	"Resurrection Power"	—	6	2	2	6		Holy Roar
2018	"Nobody Loves Me Like You"	—	15	12	12	25		Holy Roar
2019	"Is He Worthy?"	—	12	13	13	10		Holy Roar
2019	"Christmas Day" (featuring We the Kingdom)	—	20	10	2	—		Christmas Day: Christmas Songs of Worship (EP)
2020	"Who You Are to Me" (featuring Lady A)	—	2	1	1	5	RIAA: Gold	Chris Tomlin & Friends
2021	"God Who Listens" (featuring Thomas Rhett)	—	13	12	13	13		Chris Tomlin & Friends
2021	"I See You" (with Brandon Lake)	—	31	50	—	10		Always
2021	"Thank You Lord" (featuring Thomas Rhett & Florida Georgia Line)	—	11	6	14	1	RIAA: Gold	Chris Tomlin & Friends
2021	"Emmanuel God With Us" (featuring Anne Wilson)	—	—	—	—	—		non-album single (Note: "Emmanuel God With Us" featuring Anne Wilson was released as a standalone single. Tomlin released the live version of the song solely performed by himself on his live album, Emmanuel: Christmas Songs Of Worship.)
2022	"Always"	—	6	5	7	—		Always
2022	"Yahweh (No One)" (with Elevation Worship)	—	—	46	—	—		Always
2023	"Holy Forever"	— (Note: "Holy Forever" did not enter the Billboard Bubbling Under Hot 100 Singles, but peaked at No. 3 on the Digital Song Sales)	1	1	1	2	RIAA: Platinum; RMNZ: Gold	Always
2025	"The Answer"	—	—	—	—	—		Always
2025	"No Greater Love"	—	—	—	—	—		Non-album single
2025	"The First Hymn"	—	49	—	—	—		The King Is Still the King
2025	"How Good It Is"	—	12	2	4	—		The King Is Still the King
"—" denotes releases that did not chart.

=== As featured artist ===
Year	Single	Peak chart positions					Certifications	Album
Year	Single	US	US Country Songs	US Country Airplay	CAN Country	CAN	Certifications	Album
2020	"Be a Light" (Thomas Rhett featuring Reba McEntire, Hillary Scott, Chris Tomlin, and Keith Urban)	42	7	2	3	74	RIAA: Platinum	non-album single
"—" denotes releases that did not chart.

== Promotional singles ==
Year	Title	Peak chart positions		Album
Year	Title	US Christ.	US Christ. Air	Album
2025	"You Are My King (Amazing Love)"	—	—	The King Is Still the King
2025	"Doesn't He"	49	28	The King Is Still the King
2025	"Jesus Saves" (original or with the Birginham Youth & Young Adult Fellowship Choir)	—	—	The King Is Still the King
"—" denotes releases that did not chart.

== Other charted songs ==
Year	Title	Peak chart positions				Album
Year	Title	US Christ.	US Christ. Air.	US Christ. AC	US Christ. Digital	Album
2003	"Expressions of Your Love" (Rebecca St. James and Chris Tomlin)	32		32	—	Wait for Me: The Best from Rebecca St. James
2005	"Angels We Have Heard on High"	5		4	—	WOW Christmas: Green
2006	"Son of God" (Starfield featuring Chris Tomlin)	—		30	—	Beauty in the Broken
2009	"Emmanuel (Hallowed Manger Ground)"	7		2	—	Glory in the Highest: Christmas Songs of Worship
2009	"Joy to the World (Unspeakable Joy)"	6		4	36	Glory in the Highest: Christmas Songs of Worship
2009	"Hark! The Herald Angels Sing"	41		—	—	Glory in the Highest: Christmas Songs of Worship
2009	"Winter Snow" (featuring Audrey Assad)	14		16	43	Glory in the Highest: Christmas Songs of Worship
2011	"Your Grace Is Enough"	—		—	40	Arriving
2013	"Awake My Soul" (featuring Lecrae)	—		—	7	Burning Lights
2014	"Lay Me Down" (Passion featuring Chris Tomlin and Matt Redman)	47	—	—	—	Passion: White Flag
2014	"Greater"	49	—	—	30	Love Ran Red
2016	"A Christmas Alleluia" (featuring Lauren Daigle & Leslie Jordan)	36	—	—	—	Adore: Christmas Songs of Worship
2016	"What Child Is This?" (featuring All Sons & Daughters)	46	—	—	—	Adore: Christmas Songs of Worship
2017	"Adore"	17	13	15	—	Adore: Christmas Songs of Worship
2018	"Holy Roar"	38	—	—	—	Holy Roar
2020	"Be the Moon" (featuring Brett Young & Cassadee Pope)	30	—	—	17	Chris Tomlin & Friends
2020	"Sing" (featuring Russell Dickerson & Florida Georgia Line)	32	—	—	21	Chris Tomlin & Friends
2020	"Forever Home" (featuring Florida Georgia Line)	48	—	—	23	Chris Tomlin & Friends
2021	"Good To Be Loved By You" (featuring Tyler Hubbard)	34	—	—	—	Chris Tomlin & Friends: Summer EP
2025	"Still the King"	23	—	—	—	The King Is Still the King

== Non-album songs ==
- "Whisper My Name" [Forefront] - Eterne: Never Be the Same (2000)
- "Salvation" - Pour Over Me - Worship Together Live 2001 (2001)
- "Give Us Clean Hands" - Pour Over Me - Worship Together Live 2001 (2001)
- "Satisfied" [Forefront] - Secrets Of The Vine: Music... A Worship Experience (2002)
- "Lord, I'm Gonna Love You" [Sparrow] - Your Love Broke Through (2002)
- "Expressions of Your Love" (duet w/ Rebecca St. James) [Sparrow] - It Takes Two: 15 Collaborations & Duets (2003)
- "Where the Streets Have No Name" [Sparrow/EMI CMG] - In the Name of Love: Artists United for Africa (2004)
- "You're the One" [Disney/EMI CMG] - Music Inspired by The Chronicles of Narnia: The Lion, the Witch and the Wardrobe (2005)
- "Angels We Have Heard on High" [Word] - WOW Christmas: Green (2005)
- "Mighty to Save" [Integrity] - Bonus disc included with Fruitcake and Ice Cream DVD (2008)
- "Your Heart (David)" - Music Inspired by The Story (2011)
- "Heart of God - Live" - III Live at Hillsong Conference (2018)

== Music videos ==
- "Expressions of Your Love" (with Rebecca St. James) (2004)
- "Amazing Grace (My Chains are Gone)" (2007)
- "I Lift My Hands" (2011)
- "He Shall Reign Forevermore" (2015)
- "Good Good Father" (with Pat Barrett) (2016)
- "Jesus" (2016)
- "Home" (2017)
- "Resurrection Power" (2018)
- "Nobody Loves Me Like You Love Me Jesus" (2018)
