= Dove Award for Worship Album of the Year =

Annual US music award

- Country: United States
- Presented by: Gospel Music Association
- First award: 1981
- Currently held by: Elevation Worship and Maverick City Music - Old Church Basement (2021)

The Dove Award for Worship Album of the Year is presented by the Gospel Music Association of the United States. The category was first introduced as Praise and Worship Album of the Year at the 12th GMA Dove Awards in 1981, and since then is presented annually. Worship Album of the Year is presented to the artist (if prominent on the album) and the producer (if other than the artist).

== Recipients ==
=== 1980s ===
Year	Album	Artist(s)
1981
1981	The Lord’s Prayer	Reba Rambo & Dony McGuire
1981	4: In His Time	Maranatha Praise
1981	Come to the Quiet	John Michael Talbot
1981	Rise Again... He’s Alive	Paul Johnson
1981	Worship	Jimmy Swaggart
1982
1982	Exaltation	Ronn Huff
1982	5: It’s Time to Praise the Lord	Maranatha Praise
1982	Arise, My Soul Arise	Bridge With Sanctuary Choir
1982	Carpenter’s Town	Ragan Courtney
1982	For The Bride	John Michael Talbot
1983
1983	Light Eternal	John Michael Talbot
1983	6	Maranatha Praise
1983	Come, Trust the Lord	Cam Floria
1983	Sunday Morning	Don Wyrtzen
1983	On Wings of the Wind	Terry Talbot
1984
1984	Celebrate The Joy	David T. Clydesdale
1984	Grace Upon Grace	Gordon Jensen
1984	Great Is Thy Faithfulness	Don Marsh
1984	Psalms Alive	The Maranatha Singers
1984	Restoration	Evie
1985
1985	The Praise In Us	Neal Joseph
1985	Hymns Triumphant Vol. II	London Philharmonic Orchestra
1985	Just Piano Praise III	Nathan P. Digesare
1985	O Magnify the Lord: A Christmas Service of Worship	Ronn Huff
1985	Upon This Rock	David T. Clydesdale
1986
1986	I’ve Just Seen Jesus	Bill Gaither
1987
1987	Hymns	2nd Chapter of Acts
1987	Be Exalted	John Michael Talbot
1987	Hymns For All Seasons Vol. 3	Ronn Huff
1987	I Just Want to Praise You	Church In The City
1987	Psalms Alive 3	The Maranatha Singers
1988
1988	The Final Word	Michael Card
1989
1989	10	Maranatha Praise

=== 1990s ===
Year	Album	Artist(s)
1990
1990	Our Hymns	Various Artists
1991
1991	Strong and Mighty Hands	Voices of Praise
1992
1992	Sanctuary	Twila Paris
1993
1993	Coram Deo	Various Artists
1994
1994	Songs From the Loft	Various Artists
1994	King of the Nations	Graham Kendrick
1994	Live... We Come Rejoicing	The Brooklyn Tabernacle Choir
1994	Lord of All, Songs of Carman	Carman
1994	Rejoice Africa	Lionel Peterson
1995
1995	Coram Deo II	Various Artists
1995	Acapella Worship Classics	Various Artists
1995	Bless The Lord	Various Artists
1995	God Is Able	Ron Kenoly
1995	I Belong to Jesus, Vol. 2	Dennis Jernigan
1996
1996	Raise the Standard	Promise Keepers
1996	At the Foot of the Cross - Volume Two: Seven Last Words of Christ	Various Artists
1996	In His Presence	Phil Driscoll
1996	Praise Him... Live!	The Brooklyn Tabernacle Choir
1996	Sing Out With One Voice	Ron Kenoly
1997
1997	Welcome Home	Ron Kenoly
1997	Break Down The Walls	Maranatha! Promise Band
1997	God Can!	Alvin Slaughter
1997	Revival at Brownsville	Various Artists
1997	Shout to the Lord	Christian Hills Life Center
1998
1998	Petra Praise 2: We Need Jesus	Petra
1998	Favorite Song of All	The Brooklyn Tabernacle Choir
1998	Let the River Flow	Darrel Evans
1998	The Making of a Godly Man	Maranatha Praise
1998	Yes!	Alvin Slaughter
1999
1999	Renewing the Heart: Four Such a Time as This [Live]	Kim Hill
1999	Acoustic Worship: 25 of Your Favorite Praise and Worship Songs	Various Artists
1999	Freedom	Darrel Evans
1999	God Came Near	Max Lucado
1999	Skalleluia!	The Insyderz

=== 2000s ===
Year	Album	Artist(s)
2000
2000	Sonicflood	Sonicflood
2000	Better Is One Day	Passion
2000	High & Lifted Up	The Brooklyn Tabernacle Choir
2000	Shout to the Lord 2000	Hillsong
2000	There Is Joy In The Lord: The Worship Songs of Cheri Keaggy	Cheri Keaggy
2001
2001	Offerings: A Worship Album	Third Day
2001	Ardent Worship	Skillet
2001	By Your Side	Darlene Zschech, Hillsong
2001	Glo	Delirious?
2001	The Road to One Day	Passion
2002
2002	Worship	Michael W. Smith
2002	In the Company of Angels: A Call to Worship	Caedmon's Call
2002	Let My Words Be Few	Phillips, Craig and Dean
2002	Much	Ten Shekel Shirt
2002	You Are My World	Darlene Zschech, Hillsong
2003
2003	Worship Again	Michael W. Smith
2003	Blessed	Darlene Zschech, Hillsong
2003	Lifestyle: A Worship Experience	The Katinas
2003	Not to Us	Chris Tomlin
2003	Worship God	Rebecca St. James
2004
2004	Offerings II: All I Have to Give	Third Day
2004	Adoration: The Worship Album	Newsboys
2004	Illuminate	David Crowder Band
2004	Throne Room	CeCe Winans
2004	Worship Live	Salvador
2005
2005	Arriving	Chris Tomlin
2005	Carried Me: The Worship Project	Jeremy Camp
2005	Devotion	Newsboys
2005	Let The Worshippers Arise	Phillips, Craig and Dean
2005	Open Up the Gates	Planetshakers
2006
2006	Blessed Be Your Name: The Songs of Matt Redman Vol. 1	Matt Redman
2006	Alive in South Africa	Israel Houghton
2006	He Is Exalted: Live Worship	Twila Paris
2006	Rescue: Live Worship	NewSong
2006	Strong Tower	Kutless
2007
2007	See the Morning	Chris Tomlin
2007	A Grateful People	Watermark
2007	Song to the King	Pocket Full of Rocks
2007	Sound of Melodies	Leeland
2007	Top of My Lungs	Phillips, Craig and Dean
2008
2008	Remedy	David Crowder Band
2008	All of the Above	Hillsong United
2008	Manifesto	Pocket Full of Rocks
2008	Our God Saves	Paul Baloche
2008	We Shine	Fee
2009
2009	A New Hallelujah	Michael W. Smith
2009	Great God Who Saves	Laura Story
2009	Hello Love	Chris Tomlin
2009	Opposite Way	Leeland
2009	The Invitation	Meredith Andrews

=== 2010s ===
Year	Album	Artist(s)	Production team
2010
2010	Church Music	David Crowder Band	Self-produced
2010	A Grand New Day	Women of Faith Worship Team	
2010	Alive Again	Matt Maher	Paul Moak & Christopher Stevens
2010	Awaken The Dawn	Keith & Kristyn Getty	
2010	Jesus Saves Live	Travis Cottrell	
2011
2011	As Long as It Takes	Meredith Andrews	Jason Ingram & Rusty Varenkamp
2011	A Beautiful Exchange	Hillsong	Reuben Morgan, Joel Houston & Andrew Crawford
2011	Awakening	Passion	Nathan Nockels
2011	Everywhere	Geron Davis	
2011	The Shelter	Jars of Clay	Jars of Clay & Terry Hemmings
2011	We Cry Out: The Worship Project	Jeremy Camp	Brown Bannister & Jeremy Camp
2012
2012	And If Our God Is for Us...	Chris Tomlin	Ed Cash & Dan Muckala
2012	10,000 Reasons	Matt Redman	Nathan Nockels
2012	Aftermath	Hillsong United	Michael Guy Chislett, Joel Houston & James Rudder
2012	Ghosts Upon the Earth	Gungor	Michael Gungor
2012	Make It Loud	Martha Munizzi	Khristian Dentley
2013
2013	Burning Lights	Chris Tomlin	Ed Cash, Dan Muckala & Jason Ingram
2013	Let the Future Begin	Passion	Nathan Nockels, Louie Giglio, Shelley Giglio & Brad O'Donnell
2013	Live	All Sons & Daughters	Paul Mabury
2013	White Flag	Passion	Nathan Nockels
2013	Worth It All	Meredith Andrews	Paul Mabury
2014
2014	Majestic	Kari Jobe	Jeremy Edwardson
2014	Home	Kim Walker-Smith & Skyler Smith	Jeremy Edwardson & Jason Borneman
2014	Kingdom Come	Bryan & Katie Torwalt	Jeremy Edwardson
2014	Take It All	Passion	Nathan Nockels, Louie Giglio, Shelley Giglio & Brad O'Donnell
2014	We Are Young & Free	Hillsong Young & Free	Michael Guy Chislett & Joel Davies
2015
2015	No Other Name	Hillsong Worship	Michael Guy Chislett
2015	All Sons & Daughters	All Sons & Daughters	Paul Mabury & Shane Wilson
2015	Love Ran Red	Chris Tomlin	Ed Cash
2015	Even So Come	Passion	Nathan Nockels
2015	We Will Not Be Shaken	Bethel Music	Bobby Strand & Chris Greely
2016
2016	Empires	Hillsong United	Michael Guy Chislett & Joel Houston
2016	A Live Worship Experience	Casting Crowns	Mark A. Miller
2016	Have It All	Bethel Music	Chris Greely & Bobby Strand
2016	Here as in Heaven	Elevation Worship	Mack Brock, Aaron Robertson & Steven Furtick
2016	Let It Echo	Jesus Culture	Jeremy Edwardson
2017
2017	Never Lose Sight	Chris Tomlin	Ross Copperman, Jeremy Edwardson & Ed Cash
2017	Frontiers	Vertical Worship	Jacob Sooter & Jason Ingram
2017	Let There Be Light	Hillsong Worship	Michael Guy Chislett, Joel Houston & Brooke Ligertwood
2017	The Garden	Kari Jobe	Jeremy Edwardson
2017	There Is a Cloud	Elevation Worship	Mack Brock & Aaron Robertson
2018
2018	Reckless Love	Cory Asbury	Jason Ingram & Paul Mabury
2018	Bright Faith Bold Future	Vertical Worship	Jonathan Smith
2018	Good News	Rend Collective	Gareth Gilkeson, Bryan Fowler, Ed Cash, Ben Tan & Michael Fatkin
2018	Love Has a Name	Jesus Culture	Jeremy Edwardson
2018	There Is More	Hillsong Worship	Michael Guy Chislett, Brooke Ligertwood
2019
2019	PEOPLE	Hillsong United	Michael Guy Chislett, Joel Houston
2019	Victory	Bethel Music	Ed Cash
2019	Holy Roar	Chris Tomlin	Bryan Fowler, Ed Cash
2019	Hallelujah Here Below	Elevation Worship	Chris Brown, Aaron Robertson
2019	Living Hope	Phil Wickham	Ed Cash, Jonathan Smith, Nicolas Balachandran, Pete Kipley, Ran Jackson, Ricky Jackson

=== 2020s ===
Year	Album	Artist(s)	Production team
2020
2020	Awake	Hillsong Worship	Michael Guy Chislett, Brooke Ligertwood, Ben Tan, Ben Tennikoff
2020	Peace	Bethel Music	Ed Cash, Jeff Schneeweis, Steven V. Taylor
2020	At Midnight	Elevation Worship	Aaron Robertson, Steven Furtick
2020	People (Deluxe/Live in Sydney, Australia)	Hillsong United	Michael Guy Chislett, Joel Houston
2020	Alive & Breathing	Matt Maher	Matt Maher, Mitch Parks
2021
2021	Old Church Basement	Elevation Worship / Maverick City Music	Steven Furtick, Chris Brown, Jason Ingram, Tony Brown, Jonathan Jay
2021	Graves into Gardens	Elevation Worship ft. Brandon Lake	Steven Furtick, Aaron Robertson, Chris Brown, Jonathan Mix
2021	Revival's in the Air	Bethel Music	Brian Johnson, Joel Taylor, David Whitworth, John-Paul Gentile, Mathew Ogden
2021	The Blessing	Kari Jobe	Henry Seeley, Cody Carnes, Austin Davis, Jacob Sooter, McKendree Tucker
2021	The People Tour: Live from Madison Square Garden	Hillsong United	Joel Houston, Michael Guy Chislett
2022
2022	Tribl Nights Atlanta	Tribl / Maverick City Music	(Producers) Tony Brown, Jonathan Jay
2022	Hymn of Heaven	Phil Wickham	(Producers) Adrian Disch, Jason Ingram, Ran Jackson, Ricky Jackson, Taylor Johnson, Kyle Lee, Jonathan Smith
2022	Emmanuel: Christmas Songs Of Worship (Live)	Chris Tomlin	(Producer) Ed Cash
2022	Getty Kids Hymnal - Hymns from Home	Keith & Kristyn Getty, ft. The Getty Girls	(Producers) Fionan de Barra, Keith & Kristyn Getty
2022	Clarity	DOE	(Producers) Chuck Butler, Bryan Fowler, Israel Houghton, Darryl "LiLMaN" Howell, Dewitt Jones, Doe Jones, Judah Jones, Matt Maher, Jonathan McReynolds, Jerry M Tate
2022	Keeping On	Ernie Haase & Signature Sound	(Producers) Kris Crunk, Brian Eads, Wayne Haun
2022	Breakthrough: The Exodus (Live)	Ricky Dillard	(Producers) Will Bogle, Ricky Dillard, Quadrius Salters, Michael Taylor

The 54th Dove Awards will be held on October 17, 2023.
