= Live from Austin Music Hall =

Live album by Chris Tomlin
- Released: December 27, 2005
- Recorded: September 18, 2005
- Venue: Austin Music Hall in Austin, Texas, United States
- Genre: CCM, worship
- Length: 41:30
- Label: Sparrow / sixsteps / EMI CMG
- Producer: Ed Cash

Chris Tomlin chronology
Arriving (2004)	Live from Austin Music Hall (2005)	See the Morning (2006)

Professional ratings
Review scores
Source	Rating
AllMusic	3.5/5 stars
Jesus Freak Hideout	3.5/5 stars

Live from Austin Music Hall is the first live album by Chris Tomlin, released in 2005. The album was recorded at Austin Music Hall on September 18, 2005. The Austin Music Hall was packed. The album was dedicated to the 2000 who were turned away at the door.

== Track listing ==
No.	Title	Writer(s)	Original studio recording on	Length
1.	"Indescribable"	Jesse Reeves, Laura Story	Arriving	4:56
2.	"Forever"	Chris Tomlin	The Noise We Make	5:46
3.	"Kindness"	Reeves, Tomlin, Louie Giglio	The Noise We Make	4:25
4.	"Unchanging (Raise Up Holy Hands)"	Tomlin	Not to Us	5:45
5.	"On Our Side"	Reeves, Tomlin, Ed Cash	Arriving	5:20
6.	"This Is Our God" (featuring David Crowder)	Reeves, Tomlin	The Noise We Make	5:57
7.	"How Great Is Our God"	Reeves, Tomlin, Cash	Arriving	5:11
8.	"Famous One"	Reeves, Tomlin	Not to Us	4:10
Total length:				41:30

== Personnel ==
The band

- Chris Tomlin – lead vocals, acoustic piano, acoustic guitar
- Daniel Carson – electric guitars, backing vocals
- Jesse Reeves – bass guitar, backing vocals
- Travis Nunn – drums

Special guests

- Ed Cash – acoustic piano, acoustic guitar, mandolin, backing vocals
- David Crowder – acoustic guitar and guest vocals on "This Is Our God"
- Seth Walker – guest vocals on "On Our Side"
- Cary Pierce – backing vocals on "How Great Is Our God"

=== Production ===
- Louie Giglio – executive producer
- Brad O'Donnell – executive producer
- Ed Cash – producer, mixing
- David Habegger – mobile recording engineer
- Watermark Communications – mobile recording facility
- Russ Long – recording engineer
- Tommy Kinnard – house engineer
- Joseph Logsdon – assistant engineer
- Bob Ludwig – mastering at Gateway Mastering (Portland, Maine)
- Jess Chambers – A&R administration
- Holly Meyers – A&R administration
- Jan Cook – creative director
- Marcus Melton – art direction, design
- Kaysie Dorsey – photography
- Shelley Giglio for sixsteps – management
