= Adore: Christmas Songs of Worship =

Live album by Chris Tomlin
- Released: October 23, 2015
- Recorded: June 2015
- Venue: Ocean Way, Nashville
- Genre: Worship, Contemporary Christian music, Christmas music
- Length: 52:09
- Label: Sixsteps, Sparrow
- Producer: Ed Cash

Chris Tomlin chronology
Love Ran Red (2014)	Adore: Christmas Songs of Worship (2015)	Never Lose Sight (2016)

Adore: Christmas Songs of Worship is the second Christmas album from Chris Tomlin. sixstepsrecords alongside Sparrow Records released the album on October 23, 2015. He worked with Ed Cash, in the production of this album which was recorded at Ocean Way Nashville with a live singing audience.

== Background ==
Adore: Christmas Songs of Worship is a 2015 Christmas album by contemporary Christian music artist Chris Tomlin scheduled for release on October 23.

The album features new, original songs and familiar favorites, along with guest performances by Crowder and Lauren Daigle.

An Adore Christmas Tour with artists Crowder and Lauren Daigle is planned for December.

In November the song was the No. 1 on the list of number-one Billboard Christian Albums.

== Critical reception ==
Professional ratings
Review scores
Source	Rating
365 Days of Inspiring Media	4/5 stars
CCM Magazine	4/5 stars
The Christian Beat	4/5 stars
Cross Rhythms	7/10 squares
Jesus Freak Hideout	3/5 stars
New Release Today	3.5/5 stars

Matt Conner, indicating in a four star review by CCM Magazine, says, "The good news is that Adore is an inspired album from beginning to end." Awarding the album three and a half stars from New Release Today, Jonathan J. Francesco states, "it's refreshing to hear some Christmas music that keeps the focus on the Birthday Boy and maintains artistic integrity doing it." Scott Fryberger, giving the album three stars for Jesus Freak Hideout, writes, "it has some shining moments, but it's not enough to warrant a purchase unless you're a diehard Tomlin fan." Rating the album four stars at The Christian Beat, Madeline Dittmer says, "Adore: Christmas Songs Of Worship...point[s] listeners to the true meaning of the holiday season." Tony Cummings, indicating in a seven out of ten review by Cross Rhythms, responds, "with such fine vocal performances and sympathetic arrangements I'm happy to ignore the occasional descent into cliché."

== Commercial performance ==
The album debuted at No. 31 on Billboard 200, selling 13,000 copies in the first week. In its third week of release, the album sold 9,000 copies in the US; in its fifth week, the album sold 11,000 copies; in its sixth week, 30,000 copies were sold, peaking at No. 17 on Billboard 200. The album has sold 90,000 copies as of September 2016.

== Track listing ==
No.	Title	Writer(s)	Length
1.	"He Shall Reign Forevermore"	Matt Maher, Chris Tomlin	4:09
2.	"Adore"	Martin Chalk, Graham Kendrick	4:44
3.	"Midnight Clear (Love Song)"	Edmund Hamilton Sears, Richard Storrs Willis	4:25
4.	"Noel" (featuring Lauren Daigle)	Ed Cash, Matt Redman, Tomlin	4:17
5.	"Hymn of Joy"	Ludwig van Beethoven, Henry Jackson van Dyke	4:02
6.	"Silent Night" (featuring Kristyn Getty)	Franz Xaver Gruber, Joseph Mohr	4:01
7.	"What Child Is This?" (featuring All Sons & Daughters)	William Chatterton Dix	2:48
8.	"It's Christmas"	John Wesley Work Jr., James R. Murray	3:59
9.	"A King Like This"	Jonas Myrin, Redman, Tomlin	4:12
10.	"Bethlehem"	Phillips Brooks, Cash, Lewis Henry Redner, Tomlin	4:45
11.	"A Christmas Alleluia" (featuring Lauren Daigle and Leslie Jordan)	Myrin, Tomlin	4:32
Total length:			42:42

Deluxe Edition (digital and Target) bonus tracks
No.	Title	Writer(s)	Length
5.	"The First Noel"	traditional hymn, public domain	2:45
8.	"Perfect Light" (featuring Crowder)	John Henry Hopkins Jr. ("We Three Kings"); Additional chorus: Tomlin, Ross Copperman, J. T. Harding	3:20
Total length:			51:59

== Personnel ==
- Chris Tomlin – lead vocals, acoustic guitar
- Ed Cash – keyboards, programming, acoustic guitar, electric guitar, bass, backing vocals
- Matt Gilder – keyboards, programming
- Matt Maher – programming (He Shall Reign Forevermore)
- Ross Copperman – programming (Perfect Light)
- Daniel Carson – acoustic guitar, electric guitar
- Matthew Melton – bass
- Byron House – bass
- Travis Nunn – drums
- Jim Brock – percussion
- Claire Indie Nunn – cello
- Jim Hoke – harmonica (It's Christmas), saxophone (It's Christmas), horn arrangements (It's Christmas)
- Steve Patrick – trumpet (It's Christmas), piccolo trumpet (It's Christmas)
- Lauren Daigle – lead vocals (Noel), guest vocals (A Christmas Alleluia)
- Kristyn Getty – Scripture reading (Silent Night)
- David Crowder – spoken word and guest vocals (Perfect Light)
- All Sons & Daughters – guest vocals (What Child Is This?)
- Leslie Jordan – guest vocals (A Christmas Alleluia)

Production

- Ed Cash – producer, engineer, mixing
- Louie Giglio – executive producer
- Shelley Giglio – executive producer, art direction
- Brad O'Donnell – executive producer
- Ocean Way (Nashville, Tennessee) – recording location
- Joe Baldridge – engineer
- Josh Ditty – assistant engineer
- Vian Zaayman – editing
- Ted Jensen – mastering at Sterling Sound (New York City, New York)
- Mike McCloskey – art direction
- Leighton Ching – art direction, design
- Kendra Harrell – design
- Cameron Powell – artist photography
- Eric Brown – live event photography

== Charts ==
Chart (2015–2019)	Peak position
Australian Albums (ARIA)	89
UK Christian & Gospel Albums (OCC)	2
US Billboard 200	17
US Top Christian Albums (Billboard)	1
