= And If Our God Is for Us... =

And If Our God Is For Us...

Studio album by Chris Tomlin
- Released: November 16, 2010
- Studio: White Cabin Studio (Atlanta, Georgia); Glomo Studios and Robot Lemon (Nashville, Tennessee); Ed's (Franklin, Tennessee); Indian River Studios (Merritt Island, Florida)
- Genre: CCM, worship
- Length: 50:52
- Label: sixsteps
- Producer: Ed Cash; Dan Muckala

Chris Tomlin chronology
Glory in the Highest: Christmas Songs of Worship (2009)	And If Our God Is For Us... (2010)	How Great Is Our God: The Essential Collection (2011)

Professional ratings
Review scores
Source	Rating
AllMusic	3/5 stars
Christian Paradise	(7.7/10)
Cross Rhythms	9/10 squares
Jesus Freak Hideout	3/5 stars

And If Our God Is For Us... is the sixth studio album by American singer-songwriter Chris Tomlin, released on November 16, 2010, through Sixstepsrecords It is also available as a CD/DVD Limited Edition featuring four acoustic tracks and a Behind the Scenes video. The album won the Best Contemporary Christian Music Album at 54th Grammy Awards, and the Worship Album of the Year at the 43rd Dove Awards.

== Track listing ==
Album release
No.	Title	Writer(s)	Length
1.	"Our God"	Jonas Myrin, Matt Redman, Jesse Reeves, Chris Tomlin	4:45
2.	"I Will Follow"	Jason Ingram, Reuben Morgan, Tomlin	3:39
3.	"I Lift My Hands"	Louie Giglio, Matt Maher, Tomlin	4:37
4.	"Majesty of Heaven"	Redman, Reeves, Tomlin	4:44
5.	"No Chains on Me"	Redman, Reeves, Tomlin	3:52
6.	"Lovely"	Ingram, Tomlin	3:54
7.	"The Name of Jesus"	Daniel Carson, Ed Cash, Redman, Reeves, Kristian Stanfill, Tomlin	4:16
8.	"All to Us"	Maher, Redman, Reeves, Tomlin	6:19
9.	"Faithful"	Cash, Christy Nockels, Nathan Nockels, Tomlin	4:45
10.	"Jesus, My Redeemer"	Carson, Ingram, Tomlin	4:41
11.	"Awakening"	Morgan, Tomlin	5:22
Total length:			50:54

Deluxe Edition
No.	Title	Writer(s)	Length
12.	"Our God" (Acoustic)	Myrin, Redman, Reeves, Tomlin	4:29
13.	"I Will Follow" (Acoustic)	Ingram, Morgan, Tomlin	4:03
14.	"Majesty of Heaven" (Acoustic)	Redman, Reeves, Tomlin	6:06
15.	"Where the Spirit of the Lord Is" (Acoustic)	C. Nockels, N. Nockels, Tomlin	4:33

DVD:

- Behind the Scenes at White Cabin Studio
- "I Will Rise"
- "Love"

== Personnel ==
- Chris Tomlin – vocals, acoustic guitars
- Matt Gilder – acoustic piano, keyboards, programming
- Daniel Carson – electric guitars, acoustic guitars
- Jesse Reeves – bass
- Travis Nunn – drums, percussion

Additional musicians

- Ed Cash – programming, electric guitars, acoustic guitars, backing vocals
- Scott Cash – keyboards, programming, acoustic guitars, backing vocals
- Dan Muckala – keyboards, programming
- Chuck Butler – guitars
- David Davidson – strings (1)
- Luke Brown – backing vocals
- Christy Nockels – backing vocals, lead vocals (9, 15)

Singers

- Daniel Carson, Ed Cash, Scott Cash, Louie Giglio, Shelley Giglio, Matt Gilder, Christy Nockels, Nathan Nockels, Travis Nunn, Brad O'Donnell, John Pritchard, Janet Reeves, Jesse Reeves and Chris Tomlin.

== Production ==
- Louie Giglio – executive producer
- Shelley Giglio – executive producer, art direction, management
- Brad O'Donnell – executive producer
- Mark Endert – mixing (1–5)
- Doug Johnson – mix assistant (1–5)
- F. Reid Shippen – mixing (6–11)
- Erik "Keller" Jahner – mix assistant (6–11)
- Ted Jensen – mastering at Sterling Sound (New York City, New York)
- Jess Chambers – A&R administration
- Leighton Ching – art direction
- Jan Cook – art direction
- Jesse Owen – design
- Lee Steffen – photography
- Daley Hake – live photography
- Mike McCloskey – management

=== Tracks 1, 5 & 7–11 ===
- Ed Cash – producer, engineer
- Jim Dineen – engineer
- Scott Cash – assistant engineer
- Cody Norris – assistant engineer

=== Tracks 2–4 & 6 ===
- Dan Muckala – producer, engineer
- Dan Deurloo – assistant engineer, additional editing
- Chuck Butler – additional editing

=== Acoustic bonus songs ===
- Nathan Nockels – producer
- Jim Dineen – engineer
- Ainslie Grosser – mixing
- Andrew Mendleson – mastering at Georgetown Masters (Nashville, Tennessee)

== Singles ==
- "Our God" (2010)
- "I Will Follow" (2010)
- "I Lift My Hands" (2011)

== Charts ==
=== Weekly charts ===
Chart (2010)	Peak position
US Billboard 200	17
US Top Christian Albums (Billboard)	1

=== Year-end charts ===
Chart (2011)	Position
US Billboard 200	89
US Christian Albums (Billboard)	1

Chart (2012)	Position
US Christian Albums (Billboard)	25
