= Holy Is the Lord =

Single by Chris Tomlin

from the album Arriving
- Released: 2005
- Genre: CCM; worship
- Label: sixsteps/Sparrow
- Songwriters: Chris Tomlin, Louie Giglio
- Producer: Ed Cash

"Holy Is the Lord" is a song by Chris Tomlin, featured on his album Arriving, that reached No. 2 on the Billboard Hot Christian Songs chart and won the "Worship Song of the Year" award at the 2007 GMA Dove Awards. It reached number thirteen on CCLI's top five hundred worship songs list of 2005, and number seven on CCLI's Top 25 Worship Songs List, as of August 2007.

== Appearances ==
This song also appeared on the Christian compilation album WOW Hits 2006.

== Awards ==
In 2007, the song won a Dove Award for Worship Song of the Year at the 38th GMA Dove Awards.

== Charts ==
=== Weekly charts ===
| Chart (2005) | Peak position |
|---|---|
| US Hot Christian Songs (Billboard) | 2 |

=== Decade-end charts ===
| Chart (2000s) | Position |
|---|---|
| Billboard Hot Christian Songs | 28 |

== Certifications ==
| Region | Certification | Certified units/sales |
|---|---|---|
| United States (RIAA) | Gold | 500,000^{‡} |
^{‡} Sales+streaming figures based on certification alone.
