= Resurrection Power =

Single by Chris Tomlin

from the album Holy Roar
- Released: January 12, 2018
- Recorded: 2017–18
- Genre: Worship; contemporary Christian music; Christian rock
- Length: 4:11
- Label: sixsteps (EMI), Sparrow
- Songwriter(s): Ed Cash, Ryan Ellis, Tony Brown
- Producer(s): Ed Cash, Bryan Fowler

Chris Tomlin singles chronology
"Home" (2017)	"Resurrection Power" (2018)	"Nobody Loves Me Like You" (2018)

Music video
- "Resurrection Power" on YouTube

"Resurrection Power" is a song by American contemporary Christian music artist Chris Tomlin, written by Ed Cash, Ryan Ellis, and Tony Brown. It was released on January 12, 2018. The song peaked at No. 6 on the Hot Christian Songs chart, becoming his 27th Top 10 single from that chart. It lasted 27 weeks on the overall chart. The song is played in a D-flat major key, and 150 beats per minute.

== Background ==
"Resurrection Power" was released as a single on January 12, 2018. In an interview with Billboard, he explained the meaning behind the song, "'Resurrection Power' is that same power that raised Jesus from the dead, that we have that authority. I don't know about you, but when my feet hit the floor in the morning, I don't have that energy, you have to claim it. It's actually pretty simplistic, we're God's sons and daughters and we have that ability, letting God lead us and take that heavy weight off of our shoulders. He gives us the know-how to take authority of ourselves, breaking addictions and leaving whatever darkness that we're living in behind. This song is what it's all about, because if we don't believe in the resurrection of Jesus, than we don't have anything. It gets back to the foundations of everything and reminds us of the foundation of our faith, which is that you've been made alive," he explained to Billboard. "I felt like we needed to sing and we needed to be reminded of this. Scripture says we're brought from death to life by... the resurrecting power of God. That's an addiction-breaking power, a marriage-saving power. I don't wake up every morning thinking 'I've got the resurrection power of God' when my feet hit the ground, but this is what's true to me."

He confirms that the album will be similar to what the lead single is talking about,"Obviously our nation feels more than a bit divided and we feel more polarized than ever," he says. "Every little thing turns into some kind of argument and everybody takes their side. If one place ought to be a place of oneness and unity, I believe that is the church. Jesus' last prayer of the scriptures is praying to his father that 'your people be one.' That's what people want, all over. That's what we needed to strive to achieve."

=== Reception ===
The single was praised by "Digital Journal" who called it a "Christian ballad really tugs at the heartstrings, especially since it is filled with raw emotions and optimism. It is liberating and inspirational at the same time." It was given five out of five stars.

== Track listing ==
- Digital download
1. "Resurrection Power"" – 4:11
2. "Resurrection Power {acoustic)" – 10:33

== Music video ==
A music video for the single "Resurrection Power" was released on January 13, 2018.

== Charts ==
=== Weekly charts ===
Chart (2018)	Peak position
US Christian AC (Billboard)	2
US Christian Airplay (Billboard)	2
US Hot Christian Songs (Billboard)	6
US Christian AC Indicator (Billboard)	3

=== Year-end charts ===
Chart (2018)	Peak position
US Christian AC (Billboard)	7
US Christian Airplay (Billboard)	6
US Christian Songs (Billboard)	15
