= Glory in the Highest: Christmas Songs of Worship =

Live album by Chris Tomlin
- Released: October 6, 2009
- Venue: Ocean Way Nashville (Nashville, Tennessee); Ed's (Franklin, Tennessee)
- Genre: Christmas, CCM
- Length: 55:01
- Label: sixsteps
- Producer: Ed Cash

Chris Tomlin chronology
| Hello Love (2008) | Glory in the Highest: Christmas Songs of Worship (2009) | And If Our God Is for Us... (2010) |

Professional ratings
Review scores
| Source | Rating |
|---|---|
| AllMusic | 3/5 stars |
| Jesus Freak Hideout | 3/5 stars |

Glory in the Highest: Christmas Songs of Worship is the first Christmas album by Chris Tomlin. It was released on October 6, 2009. It peaked at No. 1 on Billboard's Holiday albums chart and No. 79 on the Billboard 200 chart. In 2010, it re-entered the Billboard 200 and peaked at No. 19. It was recorded live in the studio and features a duet with Matt Redman, as well as two tracks featuring Christy Nockels and Audrey Assad.

== Track listing ==
Album release
| No. | Title | Writer(s) | Length |
|---|---|---|---|
| 1. | "O, Come All Ye Faithful" | Traditional, John Francis Wade | 5:39 |
| 2. | "Angels We Have Heard on High" | Traditional | 3:43 |
| 3. | "Emmanuel (Hallowed Manger Ground)" | Ed Cash, Chris Tomlin | 3:57 |
| 4. | "Hark! The Herald Angels Sing" | Traditional, Charles Wesley | 3:39 |
| 5. | "My Soul Magnifies the Lord" | Tomlin | 6:20 |
| 6. | "Joy to the World (Unspeakable Joy)" | Cash, Matt Gilder, Tomlin, Traditional, Isaac Watts | 3:50 |
| 7. | "Glory in the Highest" | Daniel Carson, Cash, Matt Redman, Jesse Reeves, Tomlin | 4:38 |
| 8. | "O Holy Night" | Adolphe Adam, Traditional | 6:16 |
| 9. | "Come, Thou Long Expected Jesus" (featuring Christy Nockels) | Traditional, Wesley | 2:59 |
| 10. | "Light of the World" (featuring Matt Redman) | Redman | 4:57 |
| 11. | "Winter Snow" (featuring Audrey Assad) | Audrey Assad | 3:32 |
| 12. | "Born That We May Have Life" | Cash, Matt Maher, Tomlin | 5:31 |
| Total length: | | | 55:01 |

== Personnel ==
- Chris Tomlin – lead vocals (1–8, 10, 12), acoustic guitar (1–3, 5, 6, 8, 10), acoustic piano (7), backing vocals (10, 11)
- Matt Gilder – acoustic piano (1–6, 8–12), keyboards (1, 3, 5–8, 10, 12), Hammond B3 organ (2, 5, 12), pads (6)
- Ed Cash – acoustic guitar (1–3, 5, 7, 8, 10, 12), backing vocals (1–8, 12), electric guitar (4, 6)
- Daniel Carson – electric guitar (1–8, 10, 12)
- Jesse Reeves – bass (1–3, 5–8, 10, 12)
- Chris Donahue – upright bass (4, 11)
- Travis Nunn – drums (1–8, 10–12)
- Ken Lewis – percussion (1–8, 10, 12)
- Christy Nockels – backing vocals (1–5, 7, 8, 12), lead vocals (9)
- Nickie Conley – singer (5, 12)
- Jason Eskridge – singer (5, 12)
- Nirva Ready – singer (5, 12)
- Matt Redman – lead vocals (10)
- Audrey Assad – lead vocals (11)
- Choir is made up of various friends and families.

== Production ==
- Louie Giglio – executive producer
- Brad O'Donnell – executive producer
- Ed Cash – producer, mixing, overdub recording
- Shane D. Wilson – engineer
- Matt Armstrong – assistant engineer, overdub recording assistant
- Rob Clark – assistant engineer
- Erin Kaus – assistant engineer
- Bob Ludwig – mastering at Gateway Mastering (Portland, Maine)
- Jess Chambers – A&R administration
- Gary Dorsey – original cover concept, design
- Andy Norris – additional cover design
- Jesse Owen – packaging design
- Shelley Giglio – art direction, management
- Leighton Ching – art direction
- Jan Cook – art direction
- Mike McCloskey – management

== Awards ==
In 2010, the album was nominated for a Dove Award for Christmas Album of the Year at the 41st GMA Dove Awards.

== Charts ==
=== Weekly charts ===
| Chart (2009–2010) | Peak position |
|---|---|
| US Billboard 200 | 19 |
| US Top Christian Albums (Billboard) | 2 |
| US Top Holiday Albums (Billboard) | 1 |

=== Year-end charts ===
| Chart (2010) | Position |
|---|---|
| US Billboard 200 | 190 |
| US Christian Albums (Billboard) | 10 |
| Chart (2011) | Position |
| US Billboard 200 | 127 |
| Chart (2012) | Position |
| US Billboard 200 | 180 |

== Certifications ==
| Region | Certification | Certified units/sales |
|---|---|---|
| United States (RIAA) | Gold | 500,000^{^} |
^{^} Shipments figures based on certification alone.

== See also ==
- List of Billboard Top Holiday Albums number ones of the 2000s
- List of Billboard Top Holiday Albums number ones of the 2010s
