= Never Lose Sight =

Studio album by Chris Tomlin
- Released: October 21, 2016
- Studio: Ocean Way Nashville, The Red Room, Blackbird Studio and Yoda's Place, (Nashville, Tennessee); Ed's and FabMusic (Franklin, Tennessee); Hounds Ear Studio (Leiper's Fork, Tennessee); The Soundhouse (Redding, California); Indian River Studios (Merritt Island, Florida); Cardiff Creative Lab (Cardiff, Wales, UK)
- Length: 48:21
- Label: sixsteps
- Producer: Ed Cash; Jeremy Edwardson; Ross Copperman

Chris Tomlin chronology
Adore: Christmas Songs of Worship (2015)	Never Lose Sight (2016)	Holy Roar (2018)

Singles from Never Lose Sight
- 1. "Good Good Father" Released: October 2, 2015; 2. "Jesus" Released: July 15, 2016

Never Lose Sight is the ninth studio album from contemporary Christian music artist Chris Tomlin. It was released on October 21, 2016, through sixstepsrecords.

== Commercial performance ==
Never Lose Sight debuted at No. 6 on the US Billboard 200 with 32,000 units, 30,000 of which were pure album sales. It also debuted at No. 1 on the Christian Albums chart.

== Track listing ==
Standard edition
No.	Title	Writer(s)	Length
1.	"Good Good Father"	Pat Barrett, Tony Brown	4:52
2.	"Jesus"	Chris Tomlin, Ed Cash	4:05
3.	"Impossible Things" (featuring Danny Gokey)	Tomlin, Ed Cash, Brenton Brown, Chris McClarney	4:27
4.	"Home"	Tomlin, E. Cash, Scott Cash	3:39
5.	"God of Calvary"	Tomlin, Matt Maher, Matt Redman, Jonas Myrin	4:43
6.	"He Lives"	Tomlin, Reuben Morgan, Ben Cantelon, Nick Herbert	4:04
7.	"Glory Be"	Tomlin, E. Cash, Myrin, Jason Ingram	4:34
8.	"Come Thou Fount (I Will Sing)"	Tomlin	4:59
9.	"Yes and Amen"	Nate Moore, McClarney, Brown	5:06
10.	"All Yours"	Tomlin, Ingram, Morgan, Jess Cates	3:54
11.	"First Love" (featuring Kim Walker-Smith)	Tomlin, Morgan, Martin Smith, Kathryn Scott	3:58
Total length:			48:21

Deluxe edition
No.	Title	Writer(s)	Length
12.	"The God I Know"	Tomlin, Ingram, Ross Copperman	4:46
13.	"God and God Alone"	Tomlin, Myrin, Ingram	4:59
14.	"Kyrie Eleison" (featuring Matt Maher, Matt Redman & Jason Ingram)	Tomlin, Maher, Redman, Ingram	3:51
Total length:			61:57

== Personnel ==
- Chris Tomlin – vocals, acoustic guitar (11)
- Ross Copperman – keyboards (1, 13), programming (1, 13), acoustic guitar (1), backing vocals (1)
- Matt Gilder – keyboards (1, 13, 14), acoustic piano (2, 6, 8–12), organ (9)
- Ed Cash – acoustic piano (2), keyboards (2, 6, 7), programming (2, 3, 6, 7, 9, 14), acoustic guitars (2–4, 9, 14), electric guitars (2–4, 9, 14), backing vocals (2–7, 9–12, 14)
- Jeremy Edwardson – keyboards (2, 5–7, 10–12), programming (2, 5–7, 10–12), electric guitar (7, 10), acoustic guitar (12), additional keyboards (13), additional programming (13)
- Andrew Jackson – keyboards (2, 5–7, 10–12), programming (2, 5–7, 10–12), additional keyboards (13), additional programming (13)
- Martin Cash – programming (3, 14), additional backing vocals (9)
- Matt Maher – acoustic piano (5), acoustic guitar (5), vocals (14)
- Ian McIntosh – keyboards (5, 7), programming (5, 7), additional keyboards (10)
- Jason Ingram – keyboards (14), vocals (14)
- Pat Barrett – acoustic guitar (1)
- Daniel Carson – electric guitars (1, 2, 4, 6, 7, 10–14), acoustic guitar (2, 9, 11)
- Danny Rader – electric guitar (1, 13), acoustic guitar (13), bouzouki (13)
- Tore Kulleseid – electric guitar (2, 5–7, 9–13), acoustic guitar (6, 7, 9, 10, 12)
- Chris Lacorte – electric guitars (3, 14)
- Jonathan Berlin – electric guitar (8, 12), additional backing vocals (8)
- Andy Gullahorn – acoustic guitar (8), backing vocals (8)
- Matthew Melton – bass (1, 2, 4, 6, 8–14)
- Daniel James Mackenzie – bass (5, 7)
- Fred Eltringham – drums (1)
- Travis Nunn – drums (2, 4, 6, 10, 12, 13), percussion (2, 6, 8, 10), cajón (8)
- David Whitworth – drums (5, 7), percussion (5, 7)
- Jacob Schrodt – drums (9)
- Lewis Patzner – cello (2, 5, 6)
- Claire Nunn – cello (8)
- Anton Patzner – viola (2, 5, 6), violin (2, 5, 6)
- Danny Gokey – vocals (3)
- Gabe Kossol – backing vocals (5–7, 12)
- Jill Phillips – backing vocals (8)
- Franni Cash – additional backing vocals (9)
- Nickie Conley – additional backing vocals (9)
- Jason Eskridge – additional backing vocals (9)
- Chris McClarney – additional backing vocals (9)
- Kim Walker-Smith – vocals (11)
- Micah Wilshire – backing vocals (13)
- Scott Cash – backing vocals (14)
- Matt Redman – vocals (14)

== Production ==
- Brad O'Donnell – A&R
- Ross Copperman – producer (1, 13)
- Ed Cash – producer (2–4, 9, 14), vocal producer (5–7, 10–12)
- Jeremy Edwardson – producer (2, 5–13)
- Scott Johnson – production assistant (1)
- Becca Wildsmith – art direction, design
- Cameron Powell – photography
- Marz – grooming
- Kim Rosen Perrett – styling

Technical credits

- Stephen Marcussen – mastering at Marcussen Mastering (Hollywood, California)
- Brian David Willis – digital editing (1)
- Joe Baldridge – engineer (1, 2, 6, 8–13)
- Justin Niebank – mixing (1)
- Mark Endert – mixing (2, 5)
- Maestro Lightford – vocal recording for Danny Gokey (3)
- Robert Orton – mixing (4)
- Christopher Stevens – mixing (6)
- Sam "Mix" Gibson – mixing (7, 8, 10–12)
- Sean Moffitt – mixing (9, 13, 14)
- Ed Cash – additional engineer (2), engineer (3, 4, 9, 14), mixing (3)
- Jeremy Edwardson – additional engineer (2, 6, 8, 10–13), engineer (5, 7, 9), vocal recording for Kim Walker-Smith (11)
- Andrew Jackson – additional engineer (2, 6, 8, 10–13), engineer (5, 9), assistant engineer (7)
- Josh Ditty – assistant engineer (1, 2, 6, 8–13)
- Drew Bollman – mix assistant (1)
- Doug Johnson – mix assistant (2, 5)

== Charts ==
Chart (2016)	Peak position
Australian Albums (ARIA)	71
Canadian Albums (Billboard)	64
US Billboard 200	6
US Top Christian Albums (Billboard)	1

== Certifications ==
Region	Certification	Certified units/sales
United States (RIAA)	Gold	500,000^{‡}
^{‡} Sales+streaming figures based on certification alone.

== Awards and nominations ==
GMA Dove Awards

Year	Award	Result
2017	Worship Album of the Year	Won
2017	Short Form Video of the Year (Jesus)	Nominated
