= See the Morning =

Studio album by Chris Tomlin
- Released: September 26, 2006
- Studios: Ed's (Franklin, Tennessee)
- Genres: CCM, worship
- Length: 46:15
- Label: Sparrow/sixsteps
- Producer: Ed Cash

Chris Tomlin chronology
Live from Austin Music Hall (2005)	See the Morning (2006)	Hello Love (2008)

Professional ratings
Review scores
Source	Rating
AllMusic	4.5/5 stars
Cross Rhythms	9/10 squares
Jesus Freak Hideout	2.5/5 stars

See the Morning is the fourth studio album by Chris Tomlin released on September 26, 2006. The title comes from that idea that "our God is as faithful as the rising sun" and is the "Light of the World". The album was originally released in two versions: one with 11 tracks, the other with 4 alternate versions of his songs (including acoustic and demo versions) and a special behind-the-scenes look at the recording of the album. Since then, another version, the tour edition, has been released, which features the standard version, along with music/live videos, along with a sermon by Louie Giglio titled "How Great Is Our God". The first single from the album was "Made to Worship", which was first heard as an iTunes bonus track for the Passion album Everything Glorious.

== Commercial response ==
See the Morning debuted at No. 15 on the Billboard 200. Combined with a No. 1 debut on the SoundScan compiled Current Contemporary Christian, Christian Retail and Billboard Christian Album sales charts with 47,420 units sold, the CD experienced a 113% sales leap over Arriving's first-week numbers (that album went on to be Platinum-certified). The album has sold 116,000 copies as of June 2007 and was certified Gold by the RIAA in January 2008.

== Track listing ==
Album release
No.	Title	Writer(s)	Length
1.	"How Can I Keep from Singing?"	Robert Lowry, Chris Tomlin, Matt Redman	4:16
2.	"Made to Worship"	Steve Sharp, Tomlin, Ed Cash	4:18
3.	"Let God Arise"	Jesse Reeves, Tomlin, Cash	3:47
4.	"Everlasting God"	Brenton Brown, Kenny Riley	4:22
5.	"Glory in the Highest"	Daniel Carson, Matt Redman, Reeves, Tomlin	4:12
6.	"Awesome Is the Lord Most High"	Jon Abel, Cary Pierce, Reeves, Tomlin	3:43
7.	"Glorious"	Reeves, Tomlin	4:01
8.	"Uncreated One"	Tomlin, J.D. Walt	4:48
9.	"Rejoice"	Reeves, Tomlin	3:39
10.	"Let Your Mercy Rain"	Reeves, Tomlin	4:42
11.	"Amazing Grace (My Chains Are Gone)"	Louie Giglio, Tomlin, John Newton Traditional	4:27
Total length:			46:15

iTunes Pre-Order bonus track
No.	Title	Length
12.	"Lion Became the Lamb"	4:27

Special Edition bonus tracks
No.	Title	Length
12.	"Enough" (Acoustic)	3:46
13.	"Made to Worship" (Acoustic)	3:48
14.	"How Can I Keep from Singing?" (Acoustic)	4:40
15.	"Over Me" (Original Demo)	3:34

Tour edition bonus tracks
No.	Title	Length
12.	"Amazing Grace (My Chains Are Gone)" (Music Video)
13.	"How Great Is Our God" (Music Video)
14.	"How Can I Keep from Singing?" (Music Video)
15.	"Let God Arise" (Music Video)
16.	"Louie Giglio Talk: How Great Is Our God""

== Singles ==
- "Made to Worship" (2006)
- "How Can I Keep From Singing?" (2007)
- "Amazing Grace (My Chains Are Gone)" (2007)

== Personnel ==
- Chris Tomlin – vocals, acoustic piano, acoustic guitar
- Matt Gilder – keyboards
- Ben Shive – keyboards
- Daniel Carson – electric guitar
- Ed Cash – acoustic guitar, electric guitar, backing vocals
- Paul Moak – electric guitar
- Jesse Reeves – bass
- Travis Nunn – drums
- Ken Lewis – percussion

Production

- Louie Giglio – executive producer
- Brad O'Donnell – executive producer
- Ed Cash – producer, engineer, mixing
- Stephan Sharp – assistant engineer
- Jacquire King – additional mixing
- Stephen Marcussen – mastering at Marcussen Mastering (Hollywood, California)
- Jess Chambers – A&R administration
- Holly Meyers – A&R administration
- Allen Clark – photography
- Jan Cook – creative direction
- Tim Frank – director of photography
- Pixel Peach Studio – package design
- Shelley Giglio for sixsteps – management

== Awards ==
In 2007, the album won two Dove Awards for Praise & Worship Album of the Year and Pop/Contemporary Album of the Year at the 38th GMA Dove Awards. The song "Made to Worship" also received two nominations.
