= Amazing Grace (soundtrack) =

Music Inspired By the Motion Picture Amazing Grace

Soundtrack album by Various Artists
- Released: January 23, 2007
- Genres: CCM, Hymns
- Label: Sparrow

Amazing Grace: Music Inspired By the Motion Picture is a soundtrack for the movie Amazing Grace starring Ioan Gruffudd. The album features new versions of old hymns recorded by some of Christian music's more prominent artists as well as one of the most popular country artists around today.

== Track listing ==
1. Chris Tomlin — "Amazing Grace (My Chains Are Gone)" (soundtrack version accompanied by the "Wilberforce Choir")
2. Jeremy Camp and Adie — "It Is Well with My Soul"
3. Bethany Dillon and Shawn McDonald — "All Creatures of Our God and King"
4. Steven Curtis Chapman — "Holy, Holy, Holy"
5. Natalie Grant — "Fairest Lord Jesus"
6. Jars of Clay — "I Need Thee Every Hour"
7. Nichole Nordeman — "Just As I Am"
8. Smokie Norful — "Were You There"
9. David Crowder Band — "Rock of Ages"
10. Bart Millard — "My Jesus I Love Thee"/"'Tis So Sweet to Trust in Jesus"
11. Kierra Sheard — "Nearer, My God, to Thee"
12. Avalon — "Great Is Thy Faithfulness"
13. Martina McBride — "How Great Thou Art"

Some digital releases of the album omit the Jars of Clay and Bart Millard tracks.

== Awards ==
In 2008, the album was nominated for a Dove Award for Special Event Album of the Year at the 39th GMA Dove Awards. The song "Amazing Grace (My Chains are Gone)" by Chris Tomlin was also nominated for Song of the Year.
