= Burning Lights =

Studio album by Chris Tomlin
- Released: January 8, 2013
- Studios: White Cabin Studios and Berwick Lane (Atlanta, Georgia); Ed's and Little Hollywood Hills (Franklin, Tennessee); Glomo Studio, The Brown Owl and Fireside Studios (Nashville, Tennessee)
- Genres: Contemporary Christian music, worship
- Length: 48:55
- Label: sixsteps
- Producers: Ed Cash; Dan Muckala; Jason Ingram

Chris Tomlin chronology
How Great Is Our God: The Essential Collection (2011)	Burning Lights (2013)	Love Ran Red (2014)

Singles from Burning Lights
- 1. "Whom Shall I Fear (God of Angel Armies)" Released: November 9, 2012; 2. "God's Great Dance Floor" Released: July 11, 2013

Burning Lights is the seventh studio album by Chris Tomlin. It was released on January 8, 2013. The album includes studio renditions of songs previously recorded live on the Passion: White Flag album, including "Lay Me Down", "White Flag" and "Jesus, Son of God". The lead single, "Whom Shall I Fear (God of Angel Armies)", was released on November 9, 2012.

The album debuted at No. 1 on the Billboard 200 chart, becoming the fourth album from the contemporary Christian music genre to do so.

== Background ==
Chris Tomlin gave an interview to Worship Leader's Jeremy Armstrong and Armstrong asked Tomlin, "Your new record Burning Lights is a little bit of a shift for you in sound, obviously. So I wanted you to perhaps explain to people who are longtime listeners to your music, what might they hear that's a little bit different than what you've done in the past?"

Yeah I think that I'm excited about where the sound is, but it's not a huge departure. I think what we try to do is keep the songs simple. Not try to overdo anything or overproduce anything but keep the songs that need to have some energy to them really fun and keep some of the beauty as well. I think a lot of that comes from the guys that helped me produce this music. I have the very best help with me on this album. Jason Ingram, who produced most of this record and I have really bonded together over the last few years and he really gets what it's about for me; he understands how we make the record a connection even in the studio, how we make this connection to the Church and how we make this a way that is exciting musically and connects to people. I can see myself singing and playing these songs in my church. And that's what I wanted to do. I want this to be a real gift to the Church and I want people to be able to sing these songs. I think the beauty of it is just really captured in a lot of these songs. My friend Ed Cash also produced a few of the tracks as well and he's been a big part of my music for a long time. What an absolute privilege to be working with these guys.

— Chris Tomlin, Worship Leader

=== Theme ===
Chris Tomlin was asked the question in the same interview with Worship Leader by Jeremy Armstrong that "What will always be in a Chris Tomlin record no matter how long your career lasts? What would you say will always be a part of what you do when you release something?"

It's always going to be for me songs that are written from the heart of worshiping God: simple, singable songs that can hopefully find their way into the Church and that really help people to worship God and give them a voice to sing. That’s just always been it for me. That’s the filter I run [songs] through. People hear the finished product and really don't know what went into it and what was knocked off and how many times these songs were re-recorded to really get the guts of it and make you feel it because at the end of the day that's what music does and that's God's gift to us through music. You feel it in your heart and it helps us respond to God with our emotions; it's a beautiful thing. I want people to feel it in their guts when they sing a song like "Crown Him" or "Thank You God For Saving Me" or "Whom Shall I Fear?" I just want that to come out of their guts. That's what we're trying to do in these songs and really capture the emotion and write them in a way that is singable for people.

— Chris Tomlin, Worship Leader

== Critical reception ==
Professional ratings
Review scores
Source	Rating
AllMusic	4/5 stars
CCM Magazine	4/5 stars
Christian Music Zine	4.5/5 stars
Cross Rhythms	10/10 squares
Indie Vision Music	4/5 stars
Jesus Freak Hideout	3/5 stars
Louder Than the Music	5/5 stars
New Release Tuesday	5/5 stars
USA Today	3/4 stars
Worship Leader	5/5 stars

Burning Lights was met with positive reception from the critics. James Christopher Monger of AllMusic rated the album four-out-of-five stars stating the album "stays true to the worship leader's penchant for crafting immaculately rendered slabs of inspirational modern rock that crib from Britpop, AOR rock, and folk, but they hardly sound phoned in." CCM Magazine also rated the album four-out-of-five stating that after "nine studio albums in, Chris Tomlin is still turning exciting new corners. Besides his artfully wound songrwriting the project includes compelling collaborations with Lecrae, Christy Nockels, Kari Jobe and Phil Wickham." Joshua Andre of Christian Music Zine rated Burning Lights four-point-five-out-of-five, stating that "Chris Tomlin has always impressed me with his offerings, but Burning Lights is on another level! This is seriously a great album and I am sure listeners will love the fresh melodies and different styles even if you aren't a Chris Tomlin fan..." In addition, Andre wrote that "...Burning Lights feels like the most 'complete' album of his career, if you could call it like that- I don't think I've ever been excited by a Chris Tomlin album ever." Tony Cummings of Cross Rhythms bestowed the album a perfect ten squares commenting on how "Tomlin is on a creative role and this, his 12th album, is his best yet."

Indie Vision Music was also positive, rating the album four-out-of-five-stars writing that "...Burning Lights is able to break the musical mould of simple worshipful tunes, mixing the tempos and musical arrangements up nicely". Louder Than the Music's Dave Wood gave it a perfect rating noting how Burning Lights' "sets a new milestone on the worship song highway, breaking new ground with its mix of fresh relevant vibes and more established style of congregational worship. It's the ultimate modern worship album that will set the standard for what others will produce going forward". Kevin Davis of New Release Tuesday was superbly positive to the album and rated it a perfect five stars. He exclaimed that "Burning Lights is my new favorite overall album by Chris Tomlin...They are all instantly sing-able and worshipful arrangements that you'll want to add to your Sunday morning set-list. The themes of this album are Trusting God, loving Him and loving others as He loved us. All of the songs are catchy, exciting and worshipful. After listening to the album, I am stirred with compassion to love people as Jesus loves us." USA Today music critic Brian Mansfield rated the album three-out-of-four noting that if you "walk into any evangelical church on Sunday, and chances are the congregation will sing at least one Tomlin song. He'll add to their repertoire with these stirring melodies that tie him to both contemporary pop and hymns of old." Andrea Hunter of Worship Leader rated the album a perfect five stars stating that "Burning Lights is the quintessential representation of solid songwriting married to classic commercial pop recording."

Jesus Freak Hideout's Roger Gelwick and Alex "Tincan" Caldwell rated Burning Lights three-out-of-five stars in a somewhat negative review. Gelwick stated that while "there are refreshing changes that show Tomlin's willingness to venture into uncharted territory on occasion," the second half of the album was "a flickering disappointment in the end." Caldwell stated that while the "first six songs stands shoulder to shoulder with Tomlin's best known (and sung) songs", the second half of the album "is largely forgettable and stuffed with filler songs that even repeat melodies and lyrics from past albums."

=== Accolades ===
The album won the Praise and Worship Album category at the 44th GMA Dove Awards. It was also nominated for Best Contemporary Christian Music Album at the 56th Annual Grammy Awards.

== Commercial performance ==
Burning Lights debuted at No. 1 on the Billboard 200, selling 73,000 copies. It was only the fourth Christian album to do so, and the second in less than a year, the previous being Eye on It by TobyMac. However the album dropped to No. 22 a week later, making it the 7th largest drop from #1 on the Billboard 200 as of January 2017.

The single "Whom Shall I Fear (God of Angel Armies)" (2012), charted as high as No. 1 on the Christian Songs chart and No. 15 on the Heatseekers Songs chart.

== Track listing ==
Album release
No.	Title	Writer(s)	Length
1.	"Burning Lights"	Chris Tomlin, Daniel Carson, Jesse Reeves, Jason Ingram	1:04
2.	"Awake My Soul" (featuring Lecrae)	Tomlin, Carson, Reeves, Ingram	3:55
3.	"Whom Shall I Fear (God of Angel Armies)"	Tomlin, Ed Cash, Scott Cash	4:28
4.	"Lay Me Down"	Matt Redman, Tomlin, Jonas Myrin, Ingram	4:45
5.	"God's Great Dance Floor"	Martin Smith, Tomlin, Nick Herbert	3:39
6.	"White Flag"	Matt Maher, Ingram, Tomlin, Redman	4:34
7.	"Crown Him (Majesty)" (featuring Kari Jobe)	Matthew Bridges, Godfrey Thring, George J. Elvey, Tomlin, Maher, E. Cash, Traditional	5:13
8.	"Jesus, Son of God" (featuring Christy Nockels)	Tomlin, Maher, Ingram	4:28
9.	"Sovereign"	Martin Chalk, Tomlin, Redman, Ingram, Myrin	4:36
10.	"Countless Wonders"	Matt Armstrong, Tomlin, E. Cash	3:22
11.	"Thank You God for Saving Me" (featuring Phil Wickham)	Tomlin, Phil Wickham	4:26
12.	"Shepherd Boy"	Smith, Tomlin	4:34
Total length:			48:55

== Personnel ==
- Chris Tomlin – vocals (2–12), backing vocals (7)
- Jason Ingram – programming (1, 2, 5, 6, 8, 9), backing vocals (2, 5, 6, 9, 10, 12), acoustic piano (4)
- Dan Muckala – programming (2, 8)
- Ed Cash – keyboards (3, 4, 7), programming (3, 4, 7), acoustic guitars (3, 4, 7), mandolin (3, 4), bass (3), backing vocals (3, 4, 7), electric guitars (4), string arrangements (7)
- Matt Glider – keyboards (5, 6, 8–10), programming (6), acoustic piano (12)
- Jonathan Smith – programming (5, 9), bass (6), acoustic piano (11), electric guitars (11)
- Matt Stanfield – programming (5, 9)
- Nathan Nockels – acoustic piano (7), programming (7)
- Casey Brown – programming (10)
- Stu Garrard – guitars (1, 2)
- Adam Lester – guitars (2)
- Daniel Carson – electric guitars (3, 7), guitars (5, 6, 8–10, 12)
- Gabe Scott – dulcimer (5), additional guitars (6, 10)
- Chris Lacorte – electric guitars (7)
- Phil Wickham – acoustic guitars (11), vocals (11)
- Joe Williams – electric guitars (11)
- Tony Lucido – bass (2, 5, 10)
- Jesse Reeves – bass (8, 9, 12)
- Paul Mabury – drums (2–8, 10, 11), programming (5, 6), percussion (7)
- Travis Nunn – drums (9, 12)
- Ray Butcher – trumpet (5)
- David Davidson – viola (7), violin (7)
- Chris Carmichael – strings (8)
- John Mark Painter – strings (12)
- Lecrae – spoken word (2)
- Scott Cash – backing vocals (7)
- Kari Jobe – vocals (7)
- Christy Nockels – vocals (8)

Gang vocals (Tracks 6, 8, 9 & 12)

- Casey Brown, Mia Fieldes, Stu Garrard, Daniella Mason, Natalie McDonald, Jonathan Smith and Chris Young

Gang vocals (Track 11)

- Jason Ingram, Jonathan Smith, Chris Tomlin and Phil Wickham

== Production ==
- Louie Giglio – executive producer
- Shelley Giglio – executive producer, art direction, management
- Brad O'Donnell – executive producer
- Jason Ingram – producer (1, 2, 5, 6, 8–12)
- Jonathan Smith – assistant producer (1, 2, 5, 6, 8–12)
- Dan Muckala – producer (2, 8)
- Ed Cash – producer (3, 4, 7)
- Lani Crump – production coordination (1, 2, 5, 6, 8–12)
- Dave Steunebrink – production coordination (1, 2, 5, 6, 8–12)
- Jess Chambers – A&R administration
- Leighton Ching – art direction, design, additional photography
- Jan Cook – art direction
- Jeremy Cowart – artist photography
- Dan Duriscoe with U.S. National Park Service – Milky Way images
- Mike McCloskey – management

Technical credits

- Ted Jensen – mastering at Sterling Sound (New York City, New York)
- Sean Moffitt – mixing (1)
- Jim Dineen – engineer (1, 5, 6, 8–10, 12)
- Mark Endert – mixing (2–12)
- Dan Muckala – engineer (2)
- Dave Salley – engineer (2, 11), additional engineer
- Ed Cash – engineer (3, 4, 7)
- Scott Cash – assistant engineer (3, 4, 7)
- Cody Norris – assistant engineer (3, 4, 7)
- Christian Paschall – additional engineer
- Joseph Williams – additional engineer
- Mark Zellmer – additional engineer
- Nathan Nockels – additional recording (7)

== Charts ==
=== Weekly charts ===
Chart (2013)	Peak position
Canadian Albums (Billboard)	25
US Billboard 200	1
US Top Christian Albums (Billboard)	1

=== Year-end charts ===
Chart (2013)	Position
US Billboard 200	111
US Christian Albums (Billboard)	2

Chart (2014)	Position
US Christian Albums (Billboard)	20

== Certifications ==
Region	Certification	Certified units/sales
United States (RIAA)	Gold	500,000^{‡}
^{‡} Sales+streaming figures based on certification alone.
