= Monk & Neagle =

- Origin: Amarillo, Texas, United States
- Genre: Contemporary Christian music
- Years active: 2003–present
- Label: Flicker

Monk & Neagle were an American Contemporary Christian music duo composed of Trent Monk and Michael Neagle, both of whom originate from Amarillo, Texas.

Monk and Neagle both served as lead guitarists and vocalists, while revolving members included John Catchings (cello), David Davidson (violin), Dan Needham (drums), Steve Brewster (drums), Ben Shive (accordion/piano/wurlitzer), Calvin Turner (bass guitar), Jovaun Woods (vocals), Jerard Woods (vocals) and Paul Moak (electric guitar).

== History ==
Monk and Neagle met in college; after graduating, Neagle worked as a pastor while Monk released two solo albums through Grassroots Music, I Wait (1999) and Stars Would Fall (2003).

In 2003, the two began performing together when Monk asked Neagle to play with him on tour with Shane and Shane. Neagle released his own independent solo record before the two officially signed with Flicker Records as a group. Their debut self-titled album followed in August 2004. Monk and Neagle as of recently have signed with Reunion Records.

Their second album, The Twenty-First Time, was released in 2007, and peaked at #17 on Billboard's Top Christian Albums chart and #12 on the Heatseekers chart. As of January 2011, the duo's website is no longer registered, and they no longer appear on the roster of artists at Flicker Records.

In 2012, he re-partnered with Ed Cash, re-recorded the song "Beautiful You] and released it independently to Christian radio. It reached the top-10 on radio and top-50 songs on Billboard's Top Christian Songs of 2012. In 2013, Trent and Ed Cash recorded another Trent Monk single, "Rise".

Trent now lives in Waco, Texas, with his wife and children. Michael lives in Lubbock, Texas, and works in the medical industry. Trent tours with his wife as a group called "We are the Monks." In August 2023, Monk and Neagle had their first reunion concert in Amarillo, Texas. Their hope is to have a reunion tour and write new music together.

== Discography ==
- Monk & Neagle (Flicker Records, 2004)
- The Twenty-First Time (Flicker, 2007)
