= Holy Roar (album) =

Studio album by Chris Tomlin
- Released: October 26, 2018
- Genres: Worship, contemporary Christian music
- Length: 51:24
- Label: sixsteps
- Producers: Ed Cash, Bryan Fowler

Chris Tomlin chronology
Never Lose Sight (2016)	Holy Roar (2018)	Chris Tomlin & Friends (2020)

Singles from Holy Roar
- 1. "Resurrection Power" Released: January 12, 2018; 2. "Nobody Loves Me Like You" Released: August 16, 2018; 3. "Is He Worthy?" Released: February 1, 2019

Holy Roar is the eleventh studio album by Chris Tomlin. It was released on October 26, 2018, along with a book titled Holy Roar: 7 Words That Will Change the Way You Worship, co-written with his minister Darren Whitehead, and a Spotify-exclusive "Holy Roar Podcast". Tomlin announced a short Christmas tour and a 2019 Holy Roar Tour to promote the album. Ed Cash and Bryan Fowler handled the production of the album.

== Background ==
Tomlin has said that parts of the album is a response to current events. In regards to the title Holy Roar, Tomlin states that "people let a massive roar out for different things, but when you put ‘holy’ in front of it, it changes everything. It's this set apart roar." He adds that Holy Roar gives the connotation of "every tribe, every language, every tongue" giving "worship to God". Tomlin states that the lead single "Resurrection Power" reminds the listener "of the foundation of our faith, which is that you've been made alive".

=== Holy Roar: 7 Words That Will Change the Way You Worship ===
Tomlin and Whitehead started to write the book after Tomlin liked one of Whitehead's sermons. The book takes some aspects of Whitehead's sermon and gives a new way of looking at worship. The book has drawn criticism from critics that have said that the whole book is based on an urban myth, and is not factual.

== Critical reception ==
Professional ratings
Review scores
Source	Rating
Hallels	3.5/5 stars
Jesusfreakhideout	2.5/5 stars

Holy Roar has received average reception from critics. James Larsen of Jesusfreakhideout says the album sounds overall too "similar and generic" although there are some good songs. Hallels' reviewer Timothy Yap stated that the album seems too "manufactured" and "safe" for a "stellar songwriter like Tomlin".

== Track listing ==
Album release
No.	Title	Writer(s)	Length
1.	"Holy Roar"	Jason Ingram, Chris Tomlin	4:11
2.	"Nobody Loves Me Like You"	Ed Cash, Scott Cash	4:26
3.	"Resurrection Power"	Tony Brown, Ed Cash, Ryan Ellis	4:11
4.	"Goodness, Love and Mercy"	Cash, Bear Rinehart, Bo Rinehart, Tomlin	4:21
5.	"Satisfied"	Ross Copperman, Ingram, Tomlin	3:33
6.	"Impact"	Tommy Iceland, Tomlin, Mitch Wong	4:14
7.	"Praise Him Forever"	Jonathan Smith, Tomlin, Phil Wickham	4:53
8.	"Is He Worthy?"	Andrew Peterson, Ben Shive	4:31
9.	"Forever Young"	Ed Cash, Nick Herbert, Bo Rinehart, Martin Smith, Tomlin	4:07
10.	"I Stand in Awe" (featuring Nicole Serrano)	Audrey Assad, Martin Chalk, Mark Alan Schoolmeesters, Tomlin	4:17
11.	"Praise Is The Highway"	Sean Feucht, Ben Fielding, Brian Johnson, Tomlin	4:56
12.	"How Sweet It Is" (featuring Pat Barrett)	Pat Barrett, Hank Bentley, Jessie Early, Tomlin	3:39
Total length:			50:54

== Accolades ==
Year	Organization	Award	Result	Ref.
2020	Grammy Award	Best Contemporary Christian Music Album	Nominated	

== Charts ==
Chart (2018)	Peak position
UK Christian & Gospel Albums (OCC)	8
US Billboard 200	103
US Top Christian Albums (Billboard)	3
