= How Great Is Our God =

- Digital release cover of live performance

Single by Chris Tomlin

from the album Arriving
- Released: 2006
- Genre: Contemporary worship music
- Length: 4:26
- Label: sixsteps/Sparrow
- Songwriters: Chris Tomlin; Jesse Reeves; Ed Cash
- Producer: Ed Cash

"How Great Is Our God" is a song written by Chris Tomlin, Jesse Reeves and Ed Cash. It was originally featured on Tomlin's album Arriving, that reached No. 1 on the Billboard Hot Christian Songs chart. It is also featured live on Tomlin's Live from Austin Music Hall album. As of November 2014, it was the fifth most popular worship song, according to CCLI's top 25 worship songs chart. It also reached No. 1 on Christian Music Weekly's 20 The Countdown Magazine's Top 20 Worship Songs Chart. The song won the Dove Award for Song of the Year and Worship Song of the Year at the 2006 GMA Dove Awards, and Worship Song of the Year again at the 2008 GMA Dove Awards.

In 2009, gospel/jazz keyboardist Ben Tankard, presented his instrumental rendition of the song from Tankard's No. 1 charting album, Mercy, Mercy, Mercy.

At Passion 2012, Tomlin performed a new edition of this song called "How Great Is Our God: World Edition". This new version included the original lyrics sung in several different languages: English, Hindi, Indonesian, Russian, Spanish, Portuguese, Zulu, Afrikaans and Mandarin. It is the first track of his Chris Tomlin: The Essential Collection album.

The song has also been adapted to be sung by small Christian choirs.

== Charts ==
=== Weekly charts ===
Chart (2006)	Peak position
US Hot Christian Songs (Billboard)	1

=== Year-end charts ===
Chart (2006)	Position
US Billboard Hot Christian Songs	3

=== Decade-end charts ===
Chart (2000s)	Position
Billboard Hot Christian Songs	26

== Certifications ==
Region	Certification	Certified units/sales
New Zealand (RMNZ)	Gold	15,000^{‡}
United States (RIAA)	2× Platinum	2,000,000^{‡}
^{‡} Sales+streaming figures based on certification alone.
