= Hello Love (Chris Tomlin album) =

Studio album by Chris Tomlin
- Released: September 2, 2008
- Studio: Ocean Way Nashville (Nashville, Tennessee); Ed's (Franklin, Tennessee)
- Genre: CCM, worship
- Length: 58:32
- Label: sixsteps
- Producer: Ed Cash

Chris Tomlin chronology
| See the Morning (2006) | Hello Love (2008) | Glory in the Highest: Christmas Songs of Worship (2009) |

Professional ratings
Review scores
| Source | Rating |
|---|---|
| AllMusic | 4/5 stars |
| Jesus Freak Hideout | 3/5 stars |

Hello Love is the fifth studio album by Chris Tomlin, released on September 2, 2008. It debuted at No. 9 on the Billboard 200 with 52,000 units, his best sales and charting week to date. The album also debuted at No. 2 on the Christian album charts. It was Grammy-nominated for Best Pop/Contemporary Gospel Album at the 51st Grammy Awards in 2009. It was certified Gold by the RIAA in September 2010.

== Track listing ==
Album release
| No. | Title | Writer(s) | Length |
|---|---|---|---|
| 1. | "Sing, Sing, Sing" | Daniel Carson, Jesse Reeves, Chris Tomlin | 3:49 |
| 2. | "Jesus Messiah" | Carson, Reeves, Tomlin | 4:49 |
| 3. | "You Lifted Me Out" | Louie Giglio, Reeves, Tomlin | 4:13 |
| 4. | "God of This City" | Richard Bleakley, Aaron Boyd, Peter Comfort, Ian Jordan, Peter Kernaghan, Andrew McCann | 4:57 |
| 5. | "I Will Rise" | Giglio, Matt Maher, Reeves, Tomlin | 5:01 |
| 6. | "Love" (featuring Watoto Children's Choir) | Cary Pierce, Reeves, Tomlin | 4:58 |
| 7. | "Praise the Father, Praise the Son" | Tomlin | 3:58 |
| 8. | "God Almighty" | Tomlin | 6:38 |
| 9. | "My Deliverer" | Carson, Maher, Reeves, Tomlin | 5:35 |
| 10. | "With Me" | Andrew Osenga, Pierce, Tomlin | 4:07 |
| 11. | "Exalted (Yahweh)" | Reeves, Tomlin | 5:51 |
| 12. | "All the Way My Savior Leads Me" | Matt Redman, Tomlin, Traditional | 4:37 |
| Total length: | | | 58:32 |

iTunes bonus track
| No. | Title | Length |
|---|---|---|
| 13. | "My Beloved" | 4:10 |

== Personnel ==
- Chris Tomlin – vocals, acoustic guitar (2, 5, 8–12), electric guitar (3)
- Matt Gilder – keyboards (1–8, 10–12), acoustic piano (1–4, 6, 7, 9, 11), Hammond B3 organ (1, 3, 4, 11), string arrangements (2), Wurlitzer electric piano (9)
- Ed Cash – electric guitar (1–9, 11), backing vocals (1–3, 5, 6, 9, 10), acoustic guitar (2, 4–9, 11), string arrangements (2, 5, 8, 12), pads (6), programming (6), mandolin (6), choir arrangements (6), choir director (6), bass (7), drums (7)
- Daniel Carson – electric guitar
- Martin Cash – electric guitar (8)
- Jesse Reeves – bass (1–6, 8–11)
- Travis Nunn – drums (1–6, 8–11)
- John Catchings – cello (2, 5, 12)
- David Davidson – strings (2, 5, 8, 12)
- Watoto Children's Choir – choir (6)
- Mercy Naiukenge – choir director (6)
- Christy Nockels – backing vocals (7)

Singers (Tracks 2, 5, 9 & 11)

- Daniel Carson, Ed Cash, Nirva Dorsaint-Ready, Matt Gilder, Gale Mayes, Christy Nockels, Nathan Nockels, Travis Nunn, Leanne Palmore, Veronica Petrucci, Seth Ready, Jesse Reeves, Christi Richardson, Chris Tomlin, Jerard Woods and Jovaun Woods

Gang vocals on "You Lifted Me Out"

- Daniel Carson, Ed Cash, Matt Gilder, Travis Nunn and Jesse Reeves

== Production ==
- Louie Giglio – executive producer
- Brad O'Donnell – executive producer
- Ed Cash – producer, overdub recording, mixing (5, 8, 9, 11, 12), engineer (7)
- Shane D. Wilson – recording (1–6, 8–12)
- Chris Lord-Alge – mixing (1, 2)
- F. Reid Shippen – mixing (3, 4, 6, 7, 10)
- P.J. Fenech – assistant engineer (1–6, 8–12)
- Jacob Murry – assistant engineer (1–6, 8–12)
- Matt Armstrong – overdub recording assistant, assistant engineer (7)
- Ted Jensen – mastering at Sterling Sound (New York City, New York)
- Jeremy Cowart – photography
- Gary Dorsey – art direction, design
- Shelley Giglio – art direction
- Pixel Peach – design
- Jan Cook – art production
- Tim Frank – art production
- Jess Chambers – A&R administration

== Charts ==
=== Weekly charts ===
| Chart (2008) | Peak position |
|---|---|
| US Billboard 200 | 9 |
| US Top Christian Albums (Billboard) | 1 |

=== Year-end charts ===
| Chart (2008) | Position |
|---|---|
| US Christian Albums (Billboard) | 11 |
| Chart (2009) | Position |
| US Billboard 200 | 143 |
| US Christian Albums (Billboard) | 4 |
| Chart (2010) | Position |
| US Christian Albums (Billboard) | 26 |

== Singles ==
- "Jesus Messiah" (2008)
- "I Will Rise" (2009)
- "Sing Sing Sing" (2009)

== Worship Leader Edition ==
Hello Love was also released as a worship leader edition, which included a bonus disc with chord charts, lyrics and seven New Song Cafe videos, along with a video greeting from Chris.

== Awards ==
The album was nominated for a Dove Award for Praise and Worship Album of the Year at the 40th GMA Dove Awards.
