= The Noise We Make =

Studio album by Chris Tomlin
- Released: March 1, 2001
- Studios: Dark Horse Recording Studio (Franklin, Tennessee); Small Change Studios (Nashville, Tennessee)
- Genre: Worship
- Length: 54:53
- Label: Sparrow/sixstep
- Producers: Nathan Nockels; Chris Tomlin

Chris Tomlin chronology
Authentic (1998)	The Noise We Make (2001)	Not to Us (2002)

The Noise We Make is the first commercial solo release by American contemporary Christian music singer Chris Tomlin through sixstepsrecords in 2001.

== Critical reception ==
Professional ratings
Review scores
Source	Rating
CCM Magazine	3/5 stars
Cross Rhythms	9/10 squares
The Phantom Tollbooth	4/5 stars

The Noise We Make was generally well received by four music critics.

At Christianity Today, Russ Breimeier gave a positive review of the album, stating that "Contrary to other recent worship releases, The Noise We Make is a pretty good album, filled with mostly original praise songs and a few repeats." In addition, Breimeier says that even "Though I can't rave about this first album, The Noise We Make offers enough to pique my interest for future songs and recordings from Chris Tomlin." Mary Brows of Cross Rhythms rated the album nine squares out of ten, writing that "Each song is excellent" because it "powerfully stimulates" her faith and calling it "A must for every CD library!" Also, Brows states that Tomlin's "debut album has a wonderful sound, ranging from intimate worship to vigorous praise, celebration and love to our Creator." At CCM Magazine, Mike Fernandez rated the album three stars out of five, stating that it is "an impressive debut" from Tomlin because it "sonically sounds better with each listen." Furthermore, Fernandez writes that "On The Noise We Make, there are songs to sing along with and there are songs to contemplate." Zik Johnson of The Phantom Tollbooth rated the album four out of five tocks, saying that it is "as a professional, well-produced project suitable for personal worship times and group settings."

== Track listing ==
No.	Title	Writer(s)	Length
1.	"The Noise We Make"	Jesse Reeves, Chris Tomlin	4:23
2.	"Forever"	Tomlin	5:14
3.	"Kindness"	Louie Giglio, Reeves, Tomlin	4:21
4.	"America"	Jack Parker, Tomlin, J.D. Walt	4:48
5.	"The Wonderful Cross" (featuring Matt Redman)	Tomlin, Walt, Isaac Watts	7:08
6.	"Captured"	Joel Hanson	4:26
7.	"Be Glorified"	Giglio, Reeves, Tomlin	3:53
8.	"Happy Song"	Martin Smith	3:19
9.	"Need You Now"	Parker, Tomlin	4:06
10.	"This Is Our God"	Reeves, Tomlin	5:35
11.	"Forever" (Radio remix)	Tomlin	4:12
12.	"We Fall Down" (Live from Botswana)	Tomlin	3:28
Total length:			54:53

== Personnel ==
- Chris Tomlin – lead vocals, backing vocals, acoustic guitar
- Nathan Nockels – keyboards, acoustic guitar, harmonica, backing vocals
- Jack Parker – acoustic guitar
- Rivers Rutherford – acoustic guitar (6, 10)
- Gary Burnette – electric guitars, bluegrass section
- Pat Malone – bass
- Steve Brewster – drums
- Christy Nockels – backing vocals
- Matt Redman – additional lead vocals (5)

Choir

- Louie Giglio
- Christy Nockels
- Nathan Nockels
- Chris Tomlin
- J.D. Walt

Singers on "Forever"

- Darwin Hobbs
- Leanne Palmore
- Jovaun Woods

== Production ==
- Louie Giglio – executive producer
- Nathan Nockels – producer
- Chris Tomlin – producer
- Aaron Swihart – engineer
- Chris Mara – assistant engineer
- Tim O'Dell – assistant engineer
- Tom Laune – mixing at Bridgeway Studios (Nashville, Tennessee)
- Dave Lynch – vocal recording (Matt Redman's vocals) at ICC Studios (Eastbourne, England)
- Les Moir – producer (Matt Redman's vocals)
- Debbie Porter – photography
- Origin Design (Houston, Texas) – visuals
- sixsteps – management
