= Love Ran Red =

Studio album by Chris Tomlin
- Released: October 27, 2014
- Genre: Contemporary Christian music, worship
- Length: 48:58
- Label: sixsteps
- Producer: Ed Cash

Chris Tomlin chronology
Burning Lights (2013)	Love Ran Red (2014)	Adore: Christmas Songs of Worship (2015)

Singles from Love Ran Red
- 1. "Waterfall" Released: May 13, 2014; 2. "Jesus Loves Me" Released: September 16, 2014; 3. "At the Cross (Love Ran Red)" Released: May 13, 2015

Love Ran Red is the eighth studio album from contemporary Christian musician and worship leader Chris Tomlin. Released on October 27, 2014, through sixstepsrecords the album was preceded by two singles, "Waterfall" and "Jesus Loves Me" and was produced by Ed Cash.

== Background ==
Produced by Ed Cash, the album features the work of various songwriters. Matt Redman, Jonas Myrin, Ben Glover, Jason Ingram, Ben Fielding, Cash and Tomlin all contributed their abilities to the songs of the album.

== Critical reception ==
Professional ratings
Review scores
Source	Rating
AllMusic	3.5/5 stars
CCM Magazine	4/5 stars
Cross Rhythms	7/10 squares
Indie Vision Music	2/5 stars
Jesus Freak Hideout	3.5/5 stars
New Release Tuesday	4/5 stars
Worship Leader	3.5/5 stars

Signifying in a four star review for CCM Magazine, Matt Conner citing, "Love Ran Red delivers once again with strong congregational offerings that are heartfelt and memorable". Jeremy Armstrong of Worship Leader, in a three and a half star review, referencing it sounds like, " Very subtle EDM pop, Coldplay-esque emotive power and straight-to-the-heart worship production." In imparting a three and a half star review for AllMusic, Timothy Monger, recognizing, "Love Ran Red, picks up where Burning Lights left off, delivering 12 more anthemic, guitar-driven songs of praise with huge uplifting choruses and inviting hooks that should please existing fans and attract new ones." Reviewing the deluxe edition for Cross Rhythms, Chris Webb, in a seven out of ten review, observing, "Overall, 'Love Ran Red' is an accomplished album that will please many people and achieve its primary intention of providing the world Church with new material for congregational worship and the songs here are impeccably performed and produced." Alex Caldwell, in a three and a half star review for Jesus Freak Hideout, remarking, "Love Ran Red is a solid entry in Chris Tomlin's growing body of work and an album that adeptly celebrates Jesus and His sacrifice." Specifying in a four star review for New Release Tuesday, Sarah Fine writes, "Granted, while there is nothing about Love Ran Red that stands out as particularly groundbreaking, the material presented is incredibly rich and continues his ever evolving melodic experimentation... Love Ran Red will go down as yet another success in the Tomlin legacy and it is a much welcomed addition." In a two star review for Indie Vision Music, Ian Zandi criticizing, "there is not much to like about it... Skip Tomlin this year and invest in something worthwhile."

== Awards and accolades ==
This album was No. 7 on the Worship Leader's Top 20 Albums of 2014 list.

The song, "At the Cross (Love Ran Red)", was No. 14 on the Worship Leader's Top 20 Songs of 2014 list.

The album received the 2015 Dove Award nomination for Praise and Worship Album of the Year.

At the 2016 Grammy Awards, the album was nominated for Best Contemporary Christian Music Album.

== Track listing ==
Standard edition
No.	Title	Writer(s)	Length
1.	"Greater"	Ben Fielding, Chris Tomlin, Ed Cash, Matt Redman	4:34
2.	"Waterfall"	Cash, Tomlin	3:29
3.	"At the Cross (Love Ran Red)"	Matt Armstrong, Cash, Tomlin, Redman, Jonas Myrin	4:10
4.	"Jesus Loves Me"	Ben Glover, Tomlin, Reuben Morgan	3:31
5.	"Boundary Lines"	Cash and Tomlin	4:22
6.	"Almighty"	Jared Anderson, Cash, Tomlin	4:07
7.	"The Roar"	Cash, Tomlin, Wayne Jolley	3:40
8.	"Fear Not"	Cash and Tomlin	3:58
9.	"The Table"	Cash, Tomlin, Jolley	4:13
10.	"Psalm 100"	Tomlin, Jason Ingram	4:17
11.	"I Will Boast"	Tomlin, Ingram	4:36
12.	"Jesus, This Is You"	Myrin	4:01
Total length:			48:58

Deluxe edition
No.	Title	Writer(s)	Length
13.	"In the End"	Jason Dyba	3:54
14.	"Waterfall" (Tritonal Remix)	Cash, Tomlin	3:10
15.	"At the Cross (Love Ran Red)" (Acoustic)	Armstrong, Cash, Tomlin, Redman, Myrin	4:25
16.	"Let It Be Jesus" (Acoustic)	Redman, Tomlin, Myrin	3:56
Total length:			68:24

Deluxe edition - Target exclusive
No.	Title	Writer(s)	Length
13.	"In the End"	Jason Dyba	3:54
14.	"Hymn for America"		4:25
15.	"Waterfall" (Tritonal Remix)	Cash, Tomlin	3:10
16.	"Greater" (Acoustic)	Fielding, Tomlin, Cash, Redman	3:51
17.	"At the Cross (Love Ran Red)" (Acoustic)	Armstrong, Cash, Tomlin, Redman, Myrin	4:25
18.	"Let It Be Jesus" (Acoustic)	Redman, Tomlin, Myrin	3:56

== Personnel ==
- Chris Tomlin – lead vocals, keyboards
- Ed Cash – keyboards, programming, acoustic guitars, electric guitars, bass, backing vocals
- Matt Gilder – keyboards
- Jason Webb – keyboards
- Scott Cash – programming
- David Garcia – programming
- Brock Human – programming
- Jason Ingram – programming, backing vocals
- Solomon Olds – programming
- Mark Suhonen – programming
- Mads Lundgaard – programming (12)
- Hank Bentley – electric guitars
- Daniel Carson – electric guitars
- Chris Lacorte – electric guitars
- Tony Lucido – bass
- Matthew Melton – bass
- Steady Duncan – drums
- Timmy Jones – drums
- Paul Mabury – drums
- Travis Nunn – drums
- Aaron Sterling – drums
- Ellie Holcomb – backing vocals, group singer
- Jonas Myrin – backing vocals
- Patrick Anderson – group singer
- Carrollton Band – group singer
- Michael Bare – group singer
- Brian Beihl – group singer
- Kimberly Beihl – group singer
- Andrew Bergthold – group singer
- Jon Bowen – group singer
- Franni Cash – group singer
- Martin Cash – group singer
- Aaron Fairchild – group singer
- Matt Gregor – group singer
- Brittany Hodges – group singer
- Phillip LaRue – group singer
- Blake NeeSmith – group singer
- Brady Toops – group singer
- Eric Uplinger – group singer
- Mike Weaver – group singer

Acoustic tracks

- Chris Tomlin – lead vocals
- Matt Gilder – acoustic piano, Wurlitzer electric piano
- Daniel Carson – acoustic guitars
- Stephen Leiweke – acoustic guitars, drums, percussion
- Chris Cooke – group vocals
- Ryan Paul Hill – group vocals
- Jennifer Williams – group vocals
- Yanci – group vocals

Production

- Louie Giglio – executive producer
- Shelley Giglio – executive producer, art direction, management
- Brad O'Donnell – executive producer
- Vinnie Alibrandi – digital assembly
- Jess Chambers – A&R administration
- Mike McCloskey – art direction, management
- Leighton Ching – art direction, design
- Lee Steffen – photography

Tracks 1–15

- Ed Cash – producer, engineer, mixing (6, 9, 11, 13, 14)
- Joe Baldridge – engineer
- Jon Bowen – assistant engineer
- Scott Cash – assistant engineer
- Ryan McAdoo – assistant engineer
- Cody Norris – assistant engineer, mix assistant (6, 9, 11, 13, 14)
- Mark Endert – mixing (1, 3, 4)
- Doug Johnson – mix assistant (1, 3, 4)
- Serban Ghenea – mixing (2, 5)
- John Hanes – mix engineer (2, 5)
- Mark Needham – mixing (7, 8, 10)
- Ben O'Neill – mix assistant (7, 8, 10)
- F. Reid Shippen – mixing (12)
- Paul "Paco" Cossette – mix assistant (12)
- Chad Cisneros – remixing and additional production (15)
- Dave Reed – remixing and additional production (15)
- Ed's, Franklin, Tennessee – recording location, mixing location (6, 9, 11, 13, 14)
- Indian River Studios, Merritt Island, Florida – mixing location (1, 3, 4)
- MixStar Studios, Virginia Beach, Virginia – mixing location (2, 5)
- The Ballroom Studio, Los Angeles, California – mixing location (7, 8, 10)
- Robot Lemon, Nashville, Tennessee – mixing location (12)
- Tom Coyne – mastering at Sterling Sound, New York City (1–12)
- Bob Boyd – mastering at Ambient Digital, Houston, Texas (13–15)

Acoustic tracks

- Chris Tomlin – producer
- Stephen Leiweke – producer, recording, mixing
- Aaron Chafin – mix assistant
- Yackland Studio (Nashville, Tennessee) – recording and mixing location
- Bob Boyd – mastering at Ambient Digital (Houston, Texas)

== Singles ==
"Waterfall" is the first single off the album and has seen top 10 success on the charts. Tomlin explains the inspiration for the song comes from two Psalms, 42:7 and 63 and the feel of the single was described as, "...your first love of God, the love of God just washing over you again..."

The second single, "Jesus Loves Me", was released on September 16, 2014, and saw top 10 success on Billboard's Hot Christian Songs. Tomlin performed the song live for the Air1 radio station.

The third single and title track, "At the Cross (Love Ran Red)", was released on June 2, 2015.

== Tour ==
Tomlin announced a tour to accompany the album scheduled to take place in early 2015. Tomlin was joined by fellow artists Rend Collective and Tenth Avenue North. Kicking off on February 18, 2015, the spring tour began in San Juan, Puerto Rico and saw 33 U.S. cities by its end. Tomlin announced a second leg of the tour to take place in late 2015. The 21-city tour began in Nashville, Tennessee and concluded in Pittsburgh, PA, and included Rend Collective.
