= Chris Tomlin =

American Christian musician

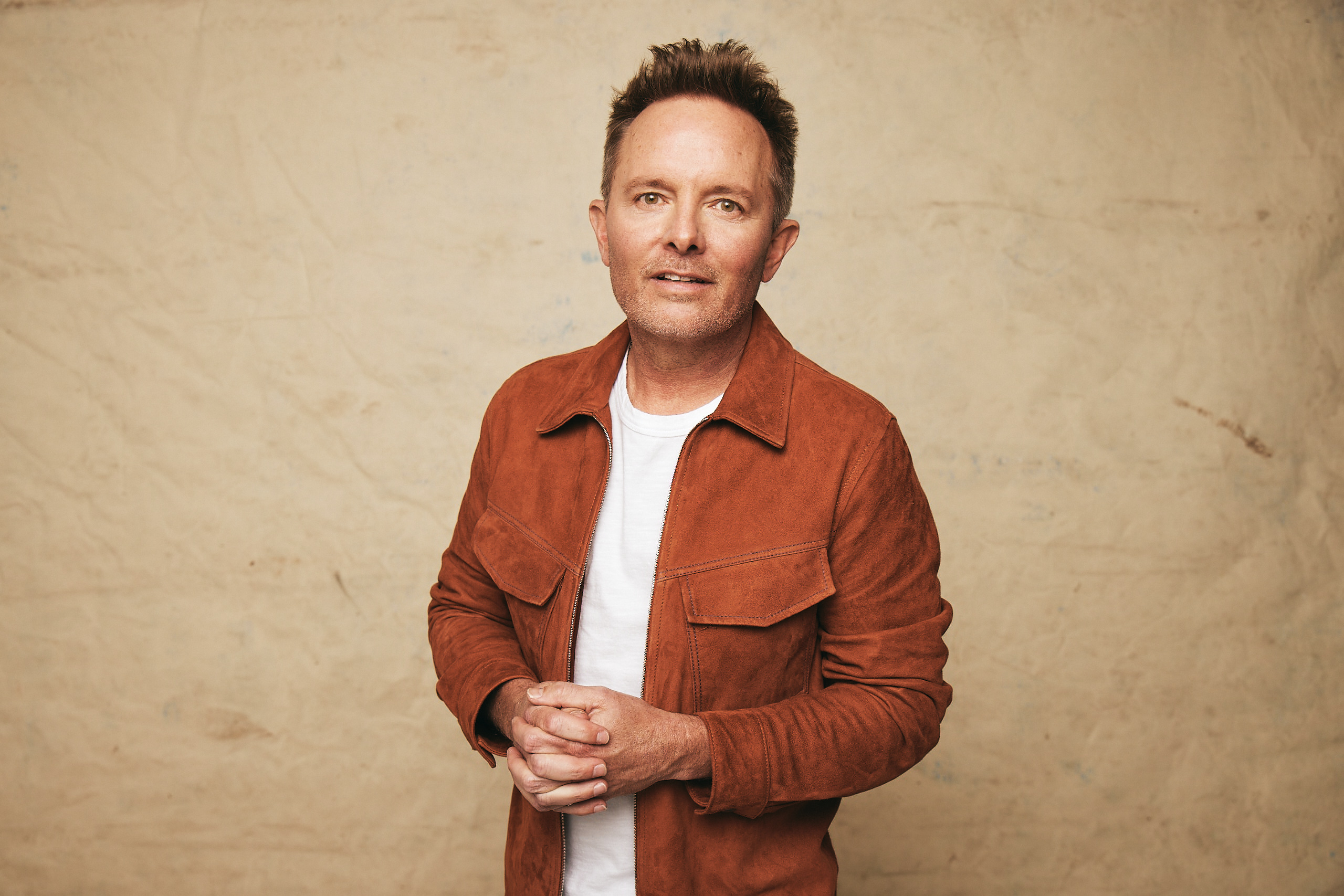
- Tomlin in 2022

Background information
- Born: Christopher Dwayne Tomlin; May 4, 1972 (age 54)
- Origin: Grand Saline, Texas, U.S.
- Genres: Contemporary worship music; CCM
- Occupations: Singer; songwriter; worship leader
- Instruments: Vocals; guitar
- Years active: 1993–present
- Label: Capitol Christian Music Group
- Website: christomlin.com

Christopher Dwayne Tomlin (born May 4, 1972) is an American contemporary Christian music singer, songwriter, and worship leader from Grand Saline, Texas. He is signed to Universal's Capitol Christian Music Group. His best-known songs include "How Great Is Our God", "Our God", "Whom Shall I Fear (God of Angel Armies)" and "Holy Forever".

== Early life ==
At the age of 13, Tomlin began singing at the Main Street Baptist church in Grand Saline. He wrote his first worship song at age 14. During high school, Tomlin learned to lead worship in his youth group. After graduating from Grand Saline High School in 1990, he entered Tyler Junior College (TJC) planning for a medical or physical therapy career. Tomlin graduated in 1992 and enrolled in Texas A&M University to study medicine. He grew active in a campus Christian group called Breakaway, where he became the worship leader. In 1994, Tomlin graduated from Texas A&M with a bachelor's degree in psychology. After college Tomlin participated as a worship leader at various camps in Texas, including Dawson McAllister Youth Conferences. While at Breakaway, Tomlin participated in a Bible study led by Choice Ministries founder Louie Giglio. In 1997, Tomlin partnered with Giglio to found Passion Conferences.

== Career ==
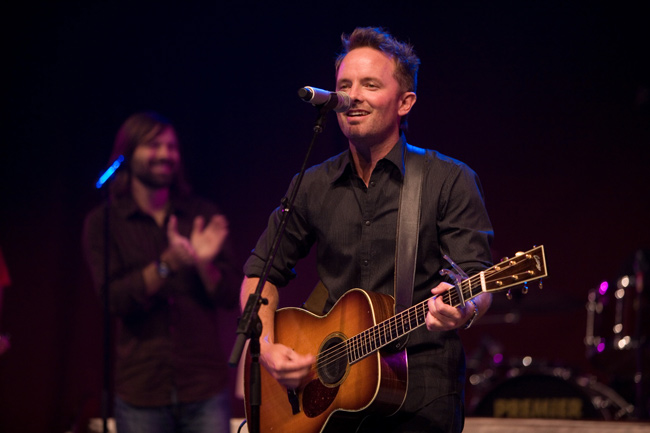
Tomlin performing in 2009

In 1995, Tomlin released Inside Your Love, which was released independently. In 1998, he released Authentic on Sparrow Records.

In 2000, Tomlin signed onto newly founded Sixstepsrecords, a subsidiary of Passion Conferences. His first nationally released solo project, titled The Noise We Make, was released in 2001, featuring the song "Forever". He released the live EP 545 and his second studio album Not to Us in 2002.

Since his signing onto Sixstepsrecords, Tomlin has released nine full-length studio albums. 2004's Arriving was the first to chart on Billboard's Hot Christian Albums chart and the Billboard 200. Tomlin has topped the Hot Christian Albums chart six times, and his 2013 album Burning Lights topped the Billboard 200, making the album only the fourth contemporary Christian album to do so.

Tomlin has also released one live album, recorded in Austin Music Hall, and two Christmas albums (2009, 2015), both of which topped the Holiday albums chart on Billboard.

Tomlin has toured with many contemporary Christian artists, such as Delirious?, Steven Curtis Chapman, Michael W. Smith, and MercyMe. Tomlin has headlined several tours, and has also joined Passion Conferences for national and global tours and events. Tomlin has also participated in various other conferences festivals including Grand Saline's annual Salt Festival in Texas, Hillsong's 2007 conference, and the SoCal Harvest in Anaheim.

On June 14, 2007, Tomlin's version of the song "Indescribable" was used as the official wake-up call for Mission Specialist Patrick Forrester on Space Shuttle mission STS-117. Chris Tomlin left Sixstepsrecords in 2015 and signed to Capitol Records CMG and River Music Holdings in 2016

On September 21, 2025, Tomlin led worship for the memorial service of Charlie Kirk held at State Farm Stadium in Glendale, Arizona. The assassination of Charlie Kirk occurred in Utah on September 10, 2025.

On July 1, 2026, Tomlin's performance at the United States Semiquincentennial event in Washington, D.C. was met with widespread ridicule due to a lack of fans and a mostly-empty event established by the White House Task Force on Celebrating America's 250th Birthday.

On October 27, 2026, Tomlin was awarded an Honorary Doctorate of Sacred Music and Worship by East Texas Baptist University.

== Personal life ==
Tomlin married Lauren Bricken on November 9, 2010. They have three daughters.

== Discography ==
Independent releases

- Inside Your Love (1995)
- Authentic (1998)
- Too Much Free Time (1998) [with Ross King]

Commercial releases

- The Noise We Make (2001)
- Not to Us (2002)
- Arriving (2004)
- See the Morning (2006)
- Hello Love (2008)
- And If Our God Is for Us... (2010)
- Burning Lights (2013)
- Love Ran Red (2014)
- Never Lose Sight (2016)
- Holy Roar (2018)
- Chris Tomlin & Friends (2020)
- Always (2022)
- The King Is Still The King (2025)

== Awards and achievements ==
According to Christian Copyright Licensing International's list of the top 25 worship songs in the US in August 2007, Tomlin held five spots with songs he has either written, co-written or performed: "How Great Is Our God" (No. 1), "Forever" (No. 5), "Holy Is the Lord" (No. 7), "We Fall Down" (No. 12), and "Indescribable" (No. 22) (written by Laura Story). In 2008, Tomlin held 6 spots on 20 The Countdown Magazine's top 20 praise and worship songs: "We Fall Down" (No. 14), "Forever" (No. 10), "Holy Is the Lord" (No. 8), "Indescribable" (No. 6), "Amazing Grace (My Chains Are Gone)" (No. 3), and "How Great Is our God" (No. 1). In 2012, CCLI reported that his songs were performed more than 3 million times in churches around the world. Time magazine has called him "most often sung artist anywhere" in 2006, and in 2013, he was also pronounced the most sung songwriter in the world. In 2017, he became only the fourth artist to receive the Sound Exchange Digital Radio Award for surpassing a billion digital radio streams, and in 2018, he became the first Christian artist to receive the Billionaire award from Pandora for reaching a billion Pandora streams.

=== Grammy Awards ===
Year	Award	Result
2007	Best Pop/Contemporary Gospel Album (See the Morning)	Nominated
2009	Best Pop/Contemporary Gospel Album (Hello Love)	Nominated
2011	Best Gospel Song ("Our God")	Nominated
2012	Best Gospel/Contemporary Christian Music Performance ("I Lift My Hands")	Nominated
2012	Best Contemporary Christian Music Song ("I Lift My Hands")	Nominated
2012	Best Contemporary Christian Music Album (And If Our God Is For Us...)	Won
2014	Best Contemporary Christian Music Song (Whom Shall I Fear)	Nominated
2014	Best Contemporary Christian Music Album (Burning Lights)	Nominated
2016	Best Contemporary Christian Music Album (Love Ran Red)	Nominated
2023	Best Contemporary Christian Music Performance/Song ("Holy Forever")	Nominated
2023	Best Contemporary Christian Music Album (Always)	Nominated

=== GMA Dove Awards ===
Throughout his career, Chris Tomlin has been nominated for more than 50 Dove Awards (at least 6 of them collaborative efforts) and won 23 of them.

Year	Award	Result
2005	Praise & Worship Album of the Year (Arriving)	Won
2006	Artist of the Year	Won
2006	Male Vocalist of the Year	Won
2006	Song of the Year ("Holy Is the Lord")	Nominated
2006	Song of the Year ("How Great Is Our God")	Won
2006	Worship Song of the Year ("Holy Is the Lord")	Nominated
2006	Worship Song of the Year ("How Great Is Our God")	Won
2006	Worship Song of the Year ("Indescribable")^{1}	Nominated
2006	Special Event Album of the Year (Music Inspired by The Chronicles of Narnia)*	Won
2006	Special Event Album of the Year (Passion: How Great Is Our God)*	Nominated
2006	Special Event Album of the Year (WOW Christmas: Green)*	Nominated
2007	Artist of the Year	Won
2007	Male Vocalist of the Year	Won
2007	Song of the Year ("Made to Worship")	Nominated
2007	Pop/Contemporary Recorded Song of the Year ("Made to Worship")	Nominated
2007	Pop/Contemporary Album of the Year (See The Morning)	Won
2007	Worship Song of the Year ("Holy Is the Lord")	Won
2007	Worship Song of the Year ("Made to Worship")	Nominated
2007	Praise & Worship Album of the Year (See The Morning)	Won
2007	Special Event Album of the Year (Passion: Everything Glorious)*	Won
2008	Artist of the Year	Nominated
2008	Male Vocalist of the Year	Won
2008	Song of the Year ("Amazing Grace (My Chains Are Gone)")	Nominated
2008	Worship Song of the Year ("Amazing Grace (My Chains Are Gone)")	Nominated
2008	Worship Song of the Year ("How Great Is Our God")	Won
2008	Special Event Album of the Year (Music Inspired By the Motion Picture Amazing Grace)*	Nominated
2009	Artist of the Year	Nominated
2009	Male Vocalist of the Year	Nominated
2009	Song of the Year ("Amazing Grace (My Chains Are Gone)")	Nominated
2009	Worship Song of the Year ("Jesus Messiah")	Nominated
2009	Praise & Worship Album of the Year (Hello Love)	Nominated
2009	Special Event Album of the Year (Passion: God of This City)*	Won
2009	Contemporary Gospel Recorded Song of the Year ("How Great Is Our God")^{2}	Won
2010	Song of the Year ("I Will Rise")	Nominated
2010	Worship Song of the Year ("I Will Rise")	Nominated
2010	Praise & Worship Album of the Year (Hello Love)	Nominated
2010	Christmas Album of the Year (Glory in the Highest: Christmas Songs of Worship)	Nominated
2011	Artist of the Year	Nominated
2011	Male Vocalist of the Year	Nominated
2011	Song of the Year ("Our God")	Nominated
2011	Worship Song of the Year ("Our God")	Won
2011	Special Event Album of the Year (Passion: Awakening)*	Won
2012	Praise & Worship Album of the Year (And If Our God Is For Us...)	Won
2013	Song of the Year ("Whom Shall I Fear (God of Angel Armies)")	Nominated
2013	Praise & Worship Album of the Year ("Burning Lights")	Won
2013	Pop/Contemporary Album of the Year ("Burning Lights")	Nominated
2013	Artist of the Year	Nominated
2013	Special Event Album of the Year (Passion: White Flag)*	Nominated
2013	Special Event Album of the Year (Passion: Let The Future Begin)*	Won
2013	Praise & Worship Album of the Year (Passion: White Flag)*	Nominated
2013	Praise & Worship Album of the Year (Passion: Let The Future Begin)*	Nominated
2014	Songwriter of the Year	Won
2015	Praise & Worship Album of the Year (Love Ran Red)	Nominated
2016	Songwriter of the Year	Nominated
2017	Artist of the Year	Nominated
2017	Songwriter of the Year	Nominated
2017	Worship Album of the Year ("Never Lose Sight")	Won
2017	Short Form Video of the Year ("Jesus")	Nominated
2018	Worship Recorded Song of the Year ("Resurrection Power")	Nominated
2019	Worship Album of the Year (Holy Roar)	Nominated
2019	Long Form Video of the Year (Holy Roar: Live from Church)	Nominated
2026	Worship Recorded Song of the Year ("How Good It Is")	Pending

- *Denotes a collaborative effort or a song contribution to a "Various artists" album.
- ^{1} The song was performed by Tomlin, but written and produced by Laura Story.
- ^{2} The song was performed by LaRue Howard, but written by Tomlin.

=== Billboard Music Awards ===
Year	Award	Result
2011	Top Christian Artist	Won
2011	Top Christian Album (And If Our God Is for Us...)	Nominated
2011	Top Christian Song ("Our God")	Won

=== K-Love Fan Awards ===
Year	Award	Result
2026	Worship Song of the Year ("How Good It Is")	Nominated
2026	Male Artist of the Year	Nominated

=== We Love Awards ===
Year	Award	Result
2025	Worship Song of the Year ("How Good It Is")	Nominated

=== Others ===
Tomlin was nominated for two 2009 Visionary Award: Male Entertainer of the Year and Song of the Year for "Jesus Messiah".

== Bibliography ==
- Chris Tomlin, The Way I Was Made: Words and Music for an Unusual Life, Multnomah, 2004. ISBN 978-1-59052-327-8

== Filmography ==
Year	Film	Role	Notes
2013	Grace Unplugged	Himself	
2025	The Last Supper	—N/a	Executive producer
2025	The First Hymn	Himself	A documentary on the Oxyrhynchus Hymn—the oldest known Christian hymn—featuring a modern adaptation co-written by Chris Tomlin and Ben Fielding. Directed by Australian historian John Dickson.

== See also ==
- Chris Tomlin discography
