= Arriving =

2004 studio album by Chris Tomlin

Studio album by Chris Tomlin
- Released: September 21, 2004
- Studios: Ed's (Franklin, Tennessee); Stardog (Austin, Texas)
- Genre: Contemporary Christian music
- Length: 46:01
- Label: Sparrow/sixstep
- Producer: Ed Cash

Chris Tomlin chronology
Not to Us (2002)	Arriving (2004)	Live from Austin Music Hall (2005)

Professional ratings
Review scores
Source	Rating
AllMusic	4/5 stars
Cross Rhythms	9/10 squares
Jesus Freak Hideout	3/5 stars

Arriving is the third studio album by Chris Tomlin released in 2004. The album has received RIAA "Platinum" status and peaked at No. 3 on Billboard's Top Christian Albums chart. As of October 2008, "How Great Is Our God" is No. 1 and "Holy Is the Lord" is No. 7 on CCLI's Top 100 songs used in churches in the U.S.

"Indescribable" is a cover of Laura Story, originally performed by Laura Story herself in 2003. Tomlin covered the song on this album.

Likewise, "Your Grace Is Enough" is a cover of a Matt Maher song, though Tomlin rewrote the chorus compared to Maher's original version.

== Name ==
Tomlin named this album after a passage he read in Isaiah 40 because he said he feels "as though we're like this landing strip in the desert for our great, incredible God to arrive on; a way for Him to come into people's lives."

== Track listing ==
No.	Title	Writer(s)	Length
1.	"Indescribable"	Laura Story, Jesse Reeves (additional lyrics)	3:57
2.	"Holy Is the Lord"	Chris Tomlin, Louie Giglio	4:11
3.	"How Great Is Our God"	Tomlin, Reeves, Ed Cash	4:26
4.	"Your Grace Is Enough"	Matt Maher, Tomlin (additional lyrics)	4:08
5.	"Unfailing Love" (featuring Steven Curtis Chapman)	Tomlin, Cash, Cary Pierce	3:59
6.	"The Way I Was Made"	Cash, Reeves, Tomlin	3:33
7.	"Mighty Is the Power of the Cross"	Reeves, Tomlin, Shawn Craig	6:04
8.	"All Bow Down"	Tomlin, Cash	4:06
9.	"On Our Side"	Cash, Reeves, Tomlin	3:36
10.	"King of Glory"	Reeves, Tomlin	3:07
11.	"You Do All Things Well"	Reeves, Tomlin, Michael John Clement	4:46
Total length:			45:53

== Personnel ==
- Chris Tomlin – vocals, acoustic piano (11)
- Ed Cash – programming (1–6, 8, 9, 11), acoustic guitars (1–6, 8–11), electric guitars (1), backing vocals (1–6, 8, 10, 11), keyboards (2, 3, 5, 9), mandolin (2), acoustic piano (3), classical guitar (7), bass (7)
- Laura Story – acoustic piano (1)
- Daniel Carson – electric guitars (1–6, 8–11)
- Jesse Reeves – bass (1–6, 8–11)
- Dan Needham – drums (1, 3, 5, 9–11)
- Joey Parish – drums (2, 4, 6, 8–10)
- Matt Slocum – cello (7)
- Christy Nockels – backing vocals (3)
- Nathan Nockels – backing vocals (3)
- Darwin Hobbs – backing vocals (3, 9)
- Gale Mayes-West – backing vocals (3, 9)
- Leanne Palmore – backing vocals (3, 9)
- Angela Primm – backing vocals (3, 9)
- Jerard Woods – backing vocals (3, 9), lead vocal (second verse of 9)
- Jovaun Woods – backing vocals (3, 9)
- Matt Wertz – backing vocals (3, 7)
- Steven Curtis Chapman – backing vocals (5)
- Melissa Polinar – backing vocals and ad-lib on ending (9)

Production

- Louie Giglio – executive producer
- Brad O'Donnell – executive producer
- Ed Cash – producer, recording, mixing
- Steve Bishir – mixing
- Scott Olivier – additional recording
- Richard Dodd – mastering
- Thomas Petillo – photography
- Jan Cook – creative direction
- Benji Peck – art direction, design
- sixsteps – management

== Singles ==
- "Indescribable" (2004)
- "Holy Is the Lord" (2005)
- "How Great Is Our God" (2005)

== Awards ==
In 2005, the album won a Dove Award for Praise & Worship Album of the Year at the 36th GMA Dove Awards.
