= Not to Us =

Studio album by Chris Tomlin
- Released: August 29, 2002
- Studio: The Bennett House and Sound Kitchen (Franklin, Tennessee); Recording Arts (Nashville, Tennessee)
- Genre: Worship
- Length: 43:34
- Label: Sparrow/sixstep
- Producer: Matt Bronleewe; Sam Gibson

Chris Tomlin chronology
The Noise We Make (2001)	Not to Us (2002)	Arriving (2004)

Professional ratings
Review scores
Source	Rating
AllMusic	3/5 stars
Cross Rhythms	9/10 squares
Jesus Freak Hideout	4/5 stars

Not to Us is the second studio album by Chris Tomlin, released in 2002.

== Track listing ==
Album release
No.	Title	Writer(s)	Length
1.	"Everything"	Jesse Reeves, Chris Tomlin	3:51
2.	"Enough"	Louie Giglio, Tomlin	4:20
3.	"Not to Us"	Reeves, Tomlin	4:44
4.	"Wonderful Maker"	Matt Redman, Tomlin	5:00
5.	"Famous One"	Reeves, Tomlin	4:17
6.	"Come Let Us Worship"	Dave Doherty, Reeves, Tomlin	4:24
7.	"The River"	Daniel Carson, Reeves, Tomlin	3:48
8.	"Unchanging"	Tomlin	4:51
9.	"Come Home Running"	Reeves, Tomlin	3:44
10.	"Overflow"	Carson, Reeves, Tomlin	4:35
Total length:			43:34

== Personnel ==
- Chris Tomlin – vocals, acoustic guitar, backing vocals (1)
- Daniel Carson – electric guitar, acoustic guitar, backing vocals (3)
- Jesse Reeves – bass
- Joey Parish – drums, percussion, tambourine

Additional musicians

- Bruce Gaitsch – acoustic guitars (2, 4, 6–9)
- Matt Bronleewe – acoustic guitars (3, 4), electric guitars (4–6, 8)
- Jeremy Bose – acoustic piano (6, 9), accordion (7), Wurlitzer electric piano (10)
- Phil Madeira – Hammond organ (6, 7)
- Will Sayles – shaker (2), percussion (4, 5, 8)
- David Angell – strings (4, 6, 9, 10)
- David Davidson – strings (4, 6, 9, 10)
- Grant Cunningham – backing vocals (1–5, 7–10)
- Gathering of friends at The Woodlands United Methodist Church – choir (5)
- The Worship of God Conference Choir – choir (6)

Production

- Grant Cunningham – executive producer
- Louie Giglio – executive producer
- Matt Bronleewe – producer
- Sam Gibson – producer, recording, mixing (1, 4, 9, 10)
- F. Reid Shippen – mixing (2, 3, 5–8)
- David Streit – recording assistant
- Adam Deane – mix assistant (1, 4, 9, 10)
- Dan Shike – mix assistant (2, 3, 5–8)
- Stephen Marcussen – mastering at Marcussen Mastering (Hollywood, California)
- Christiév Carothers – creative direction
- Kristin Barlowe – photography
- Jan Cook – art direction
- Benji Peck – art direction, design
- sixsteps – management
