= Ed Cash =

American musician

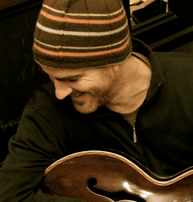
- Cash in 2009

Background information
- Born: Edmond Martin Cash; August 6, 1971 (age 55)
- Genres: Contemporary Christian music; rock; pop
- Occupation: Record producer
- Member of: We the Kingdom
- Website: edcash.com

Edmond Martin Cash (born August 6, 1971) is an American record producer, songwriter, audio engineer, and multi-instrumentalist. He has produced or written for artists including Steven Curtis Chapman, Dolly Parton, and Chris Tomlin.

From 2004 to 2007, Cash was named Producer of the Year at each GMA Dove Awards. He has won a Grammy Award from six nominations.

== Biography ==
Cash has gained recognition as a songwriter for having co-written and produced "How Great Is Our God". The song earned him five Dove Awards, including Song of the Year and Praise and Worship Song of the Year. Along with having co-written with Chris Tomlin, Mark Hall from Casting Crowns, and Amy Grant, Cash has received honors from the BMI Awards as the Christian Songwriter of the Year and for Song of the Year. He cites Stevie Wonder, Fleetwood Mac, Sting, James Taylor, Ella Fitzgerald, and Beethoven as his musical influences.

Cash severed ties with The Gathering International when it came under scrutiny in a report by Christianity Today, investigating the group's finances. The article claimed that Cash's songwriting had helped fund the group.

== Accolades ==
"How Great Is Our God"

- GMA Dove Award's Producer of the Year 2005
- GMA Dove Award's Album of the Year 2005

Arriving

- GMA Dove Award's Producer of the Year 2006
- GMA Dove Award's Praise and Worship Album of the Year 2006

Arriving

- GMA Dove Award's Song of the Year 2006

"How Great Is Our God"

- GMA Dove Award's Worship Song of the Year 2006

"How Great Is Our God"

- GMA Dove Award's Special Event Album of the Year 2006

Music inspired by The Chronicles of Narnia: The Lion, the Witch, and the Wardrobe

- Worship Leader Praise Awards of 2006

"Made to Worship"

- BMI Most Performed Christian Song of the Year 2007

"Made to Worship"

- GMA Dove Award's Producer of the Year 2007
- GMA Dove Award's Album of the Year 2007

See the Morning

- GMA Dove Award's Praise & Worship Album of the Year 2007

See the Morning

- GMA Dove Award's Song of the Year 2007

"How Great Is Our God"

- GMA Dove Award's Worship Song of the Year 2008

"How Great Is Our God"

- BMI Christian Songwriter of the Year 2008
- BMI Christian Song of the Year 2008

"Made to Worship"

- GMA Dove Award's Inspiration Album of the Year 2009

Great God Who Saves

- GMA Dove Award's Contemporary Gospel Recorded Song of the Year 2009

"How Great Is Our God"

- BMI Award of the Year 2010
- GMA Dove Award's Spanish Language Album of the Year 2010

Le Canto - Kari Jobe

- 1 Grammy Award from 6 nominations
- GMA Dove Award's Producer of the Year 2012
- GMA Dove Award's Producer of the Year 2013
- GMA Dove Award's Producer of the Year 2014

== Credits ==
- Chris August, No Far Away, 2010 – Producer, Engineer, Songwriter, Multi-instrumentalist
- Dave Barnes, Brother, Bring the Sun, 2004 – Producer
- Dave Barnes, Chasing Mississippi, 2006 – Producer
- Dave Barnes, Me and You and the World, 2008 – Producer
- Dave Barnes, What We Want, What We Get, 2010 - Producer
- Vicky Beeching, Painting the Invisible, 2007- Producer
- Caedmon's Call, Long Line of Leavers, 2000 – Producer, Engineer, Multi-instrumentalist
- Caedmon's Call, Chronicles 1992-2004, 2004 – Producer
- Caedmon's Call, In the Company of Angels, 2001 – Producer, Arranger, Multi-instrumentalist
- Steven Curtis Chapman, All I Really Want for Christmas, 2005 – Producer, Engineer, Vocals, Multi-instrumentalist
- Steven Curtis Chapman, Musical Blessings, 2006 – Producer, Engineer, Mixing, Multi-instrumentalist
- Steven Curtis Chapman, This Moment, 2007 – Producer, Engineer, Mixing
- Church at Charlotte, I Want a Faith – "Be Unafraid", 2010 – Co-writer
- Paul Colman, Let it Go, 2005 – Producer, Engineer, Mixing, Multi-instrumentalist
- Casting Crowns, Until the Whole World Hears, 2009 – Co-writer
- David Crowder Band, A Collision, 2005 – Vocal, Producer
- David Crowder Band – "How He Loves"- 2009 - Producer, Mixing
- Bethany Dillon, Bethany Dillon, 2004 - Producer
- Bethany Dillon, Imagination, 2005 – Producer, Engineer, Mixing
- Bethany Dillon, Waking Up, 2007 – Producer
- Bethany Dillon, So Far: The Acoustic Sessions, 2007 - Producer
- Daniel Doss Band, Greater Than Us All, 2008 – Producer, Engineer, Mixing, Multi-instrumentalist
- Amy Grant, Greatest Hits 1986-2004 – Producer, Engineer, Mixing, Multi-instrumentalist
- Sara Groves, Add to the Beauty, 2005 – Songwriter
- Israel Houghton, The Power of One, "My Tribute Melody" – Co-writer
- Jesus Culture, Everything, 2010 - Songwriter
- Kari Jobe, Kari Jobe, 2009 – Producer, Engineer, Multi-instrumentalist
- Jorma Kaukonen (of Jefferson Airplane), Stars in My Crown, 2007 – Production
- Wes King, What Matters the Most, 2001 – Producer, Engineer, Multi-instrumentalist
- Leeland, Love is on the Move, 2009 – Producer, Engineer, Mixing
- Luminate, Luminate, 2010 - Producer, Engineer, Songwriter, Lyricist
- Matt Maher, Empty and Beautiful, 2008 – Producer, Engineer, Mixing, Multi-instrumentalist
- Kathy Mattea, Roses, 2002 – Producer
- Mercy River, Beautiful Dawn, 2010 – Songwriter
- Monk & Neagle, Monk & Neagle, 2004 – Producer, Engineer, Mixing, Multi-instrumentalist
- Britt Nicole, Acoustic, 2010 – Producer, Engineer, Mixing, musician
- Nichole Nordeman, The Ultimate Collection, 2009 - Producer
- Eric Nordhoff, Quietime: Worship, 2010 – Songwriter
- Bebo Norman, Big Blue Sky, 2001 – Producer
- Bebo Norman, Ten Thousand Days, 1999 – Producer
- Bebo Norman, Myself When I am Real, 2002 – Producer, Engineer, Mixing
- Bebo Norman, Fabric of Verse, 1999 – Producer, Engineer, Mixing
- Bebo Norman, Great Light of the World: The Best of Bebo Norman, 2007 – Producer
- Erin O'Donnell, Christmas Time is Here, 2004 – Producer, Engineer, Multi-instrumentalist
- Ginny Owens, If you Want Me To, - Producer
- Pierced, Worth, 2004 – Producer, Engineer, Multi-instrumentalist
- Pocket Full of Rocks, More than a Noise, 2010 – Producer, Engineer, Songwriter
- Praise-Apella, Heart God, 2010 - Songwriter
- Sarah Reeves, Sweet Sweet Sound, 2009 – Producer, Engineer, Mixing, Multi-instrumentalist
- Starfield, Beauty in the Broken, 2006 - Producer
- Starfield, I will Go, 2008 – Producer, Engineer, Mixing, Guitar
- Starfield, Saving One, 2010 – Producer
- Laura Story, There is Nothing (Gate Records), - Producer, Engineer
- TobyMac, Tonight, 2010 – Songwriter
- Chris Tomlin, Arriving, 2004 – Producer
- Chris Tomlin, Live From Austin Hall, 2005 – Producer, Multi-instrumentalist
- Chris Tomlin, See the Morning, 2006 – Producer, Multi-instrumentalist
- Chris Tomlin, Hello Love, 2008 – Producer
- Chris Tomlin, Glory in the Highest: Christmas Songs of Worship, 2009 – Producer, Songwriter
- Chris Tomlin, Love Ran Red, 2014 - Producer, Engineer, Mixing, Multi-instrumentalist
- Tommy Walker, I Have a Hope, 2008 – Producer
- The War, Waving White, 2007 – Producer
- Watermark, A Grateful People, 2005 – Guest Appearance
- Matt Wertz, TwentyThree Places, 2003 – Producer
- Matt Wertz, Today & Tomorrow [EP], 2005 – Producer, Engineer, Mixing, Multi-instrumentalist
- Matt Wertz, Everything in Between, 2006 – Producer
- Matt Wertz, Under the Summer Sun, 2008 - Producer
- Matthew West, Something to Say, 2007 – Producer, Engineer, Multi-instrumentalist
- Moriah Peters, I Choose Jesus, 2012 – Producer
- Various artists, I'll Fly Away: Country Hymns & Songs of Faith – Producer, Engineer, Mixing, author, Multi-instrumentalist
  - Vince Gill – Producer, Multi-instrumentalist, Engineer
  - Dolly Parton – Producer, Multi-instrumentalist, Engineer
- Annette Lee, All Our Achilles Heels, 2017 - Executive Producer

== Movies/DVD/TV ==
- Billy: The Early Years of Billy Graham, 2008 - Producer
- Dreamer [Original Motion Picture Soundtrack], John Debney, 2005 – Producer, Mixing, Recording
- Music Inspired by the Original Motion Picture Amazing Grace, Various Artists, 2007 - Producer, Guitar
- Fruitcake and Ice Cream, Louie Giglio, [DVD] 2008 - Producer
- Indescribable, Louie Giglio, [DVD] 2008 - Producer
