= Louie Giglio =

American pastor (born 1958)

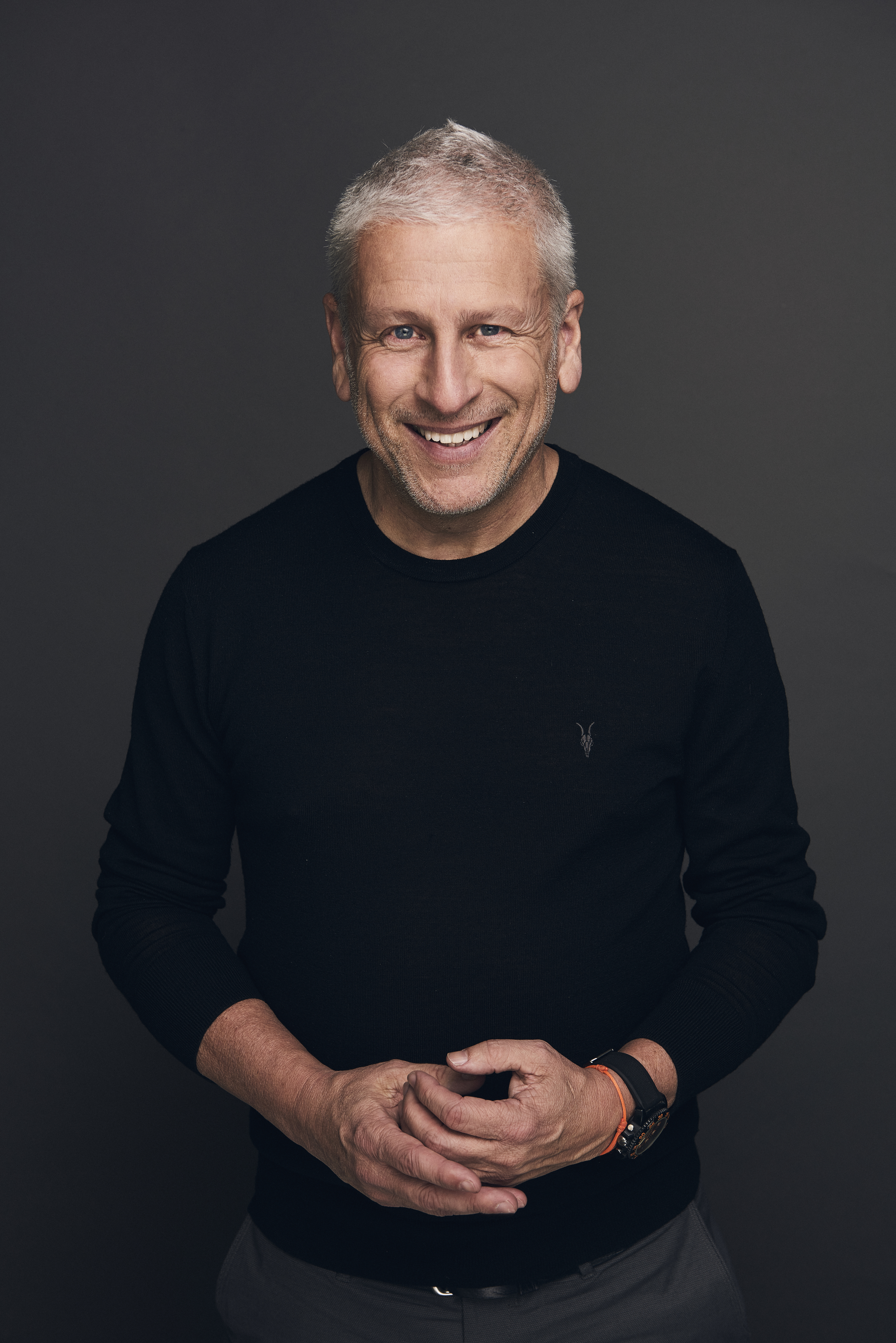
- Church: Passion City Church

Personal details
- Born: June 30, 1958 (age 68) Atlanta, Georgia, U.S.
- Denomination: Baptist (Southern Baptist Convention)
- Parents: Louie F. Giglio Jr., Martha Giglio
- Spouse: Shelley Giglio
- Occupation: Pastor; Author; Speaker
- Education: Georgia State University; Southwestern Baptist Theological Seminary—Master of Divinity; Baylor University Grace Theological Seminary

Louie Giglio (/ˈɡɪɡlioʊ/ GHIG-lee-oh; born June 30, 1958) is an American Christian pastor. He is the leader of Passion City Church in Atlanta. The founder of the Passion Movement, he is an author and public speaker.

== Biography ==
Giglio was born in Atlanta on June 30, 1958, and is of Italian descent. He grew up in the Atlanta suburb of Smyrna and graduated from Campbell High School. He studied at Georgia State University and earned a Bachelor of Arts, then he studied at Southwestern Baptist Theological Seminary and earned a Master of Theology. Later he went to Grace Theological Seminary to pursue a Doctor of Ministry degree.

== Ministry ==
After finishing seminary, Giglio and his wife Shelley began a weekly Bible study called Choice at Baylor University where he was doing graduate studies in 1985. After several years over ten percent of the Baylor student body was attending the weekly gathering, and Giglio's heart for the significance of what he refers to as the "university moment" was set.

In 1995, Giglio decided to move from his home in Waco to Atlanta because of his father's failing health, although his father died from a brain infection and a heart attack prior to their arrival in Atlanta. Around that time during a flight from Texas to Georgia, Louie was inspired to start a national gathering of college students, which would later become Passion Conferences. The first Passion Conference was held in 1997 in Austin, Texas with about 2,000 university students in attendance. Since then Passion continues to host annual gatherings in the United States and around the world for college students. Until the founding of Passion City Church, Giglio was a longtime member of North Point Community Church.

In 2000, he founded the record label Sixsteps Records.

Giglio wrote Not Forsaken, Goliath Must Fall, Indescribable: 100 Devotions about God & Science, The Air I Breathe: Worship as a Way of Life, and I Am Not But I Know I Am: Welcome to the Story Of God. Giglio's latest release, Not Forsaken, debuted at number 3 on the Publishers Weekly Trade Paper Frontlist, and ranked number 6 on the May 2019 Religion Nonfiction bestsellers list. His previous trade release, Goliath Must Fall, made the Publishers Weekly bestseller list in May 2017 and was #31 in the list of the top 100 bestselling Christian books of 2017.

== Controversies ==
On January 11, 2013, Giglio withdrew from the second Obama inauguration at which he was due to deliver a benediction after it became known in a sermon he delivered in the 1990s he urged Christians to oppose the "aggressive agenda" of the gay rights movement. He described homosexuality as a "sin in the eyes of God, and it is sin in the word of God".

In a conversation about racism with Chick-fil-A CEO Dan Cathy and rapper Lecrae in June 2020, Giglio suggested that Americans replace the phrase "white privilege" with "white blessing". He said that the "blessing of slavery" had built up the framework for the world that white people live in. Giglio issued an apology on Twitter for his comments.

== Writings ==
- Giglio, Louie (2003). The Air I Breathe: [worship as a way of life]. Sisters, OR: Multnomah. ISBN 9781590526705. OCLC 71826079.
- ——— (2005). I Am Not But I Know I Am: Welcome to the Story of God. Sisters, OR: Multnomah. ISBN 9781590522752. OCLC 57531626.
- ——— (2006). Wired: For a Life of Worship; Journey: 30 day worship. Sisters, OR: Multnomah. ISBN 9781590525838. OCLC 62084261. - a version of The Air I Breathe
- ———; Redman, Matt (2011). Indescribable: encountering the glory of God in the beauty of the universe. Colorado Springs, CO: David C. Cook. ISBN 9780781406031. OCLC 759519752.
- ———; Moore, Beth; Caine, Christine; Piper, John; Smith, Judah; Chan, Francis (2014). Passion: the bright light of glory. Nashville, TN: Thomas Nelson. ISBN 9780529110114. OCLC 871177000.
- ——— (2015). The Comeback: it's not too late and you're never too far. Nashville, TN: Thomas Nelson. ISBN 9780718097134. OCLC 962835105.
- ——— (2017). Goliath Must Fall: Winning the Battle Against Your Giants. Nashville, TN: Thomas Nelson. ISBN 9780718088866. OCLC 962835106.
- ——— (2017). Indescribable: 100 Devotions About God & Science. Nashville, TN: Thomas Nelson. ISBN 9780718086107. OCLC 979564065.
- ——— (2019). Not Forsaken: Finding Freedom as Sons & Daughters of a Perfect Father. Nashville, TN: B&H Books. ISBN 9781535956956. OCLC 1081385221.
- ——— (2019). How Great Is Our God: 100 Indescribable Devotions About God and Science. Nashville, TN: Tommy Nelson. ISBN 9781400217212. OCLC 1104859319.
- ——— (2020). Goliath Must Fall for Young Readers: Winning the Battle Against Your Giants. Thomas Nelson. ISBN 978-1400223633.
- ——— (2021). Never Too Far: Come Back from Defeat and Disappointment to Purpose and Power. Thomas Nelson. ISBN 9780785238546.
- ——— (2021). Don't Give the Enemy a Seat at Your Table: It's Time to Win the Battle of Your Mind... Thomas Nelson. ISBN 978-0785247227.
