= Passion discography =

Discography of Passion

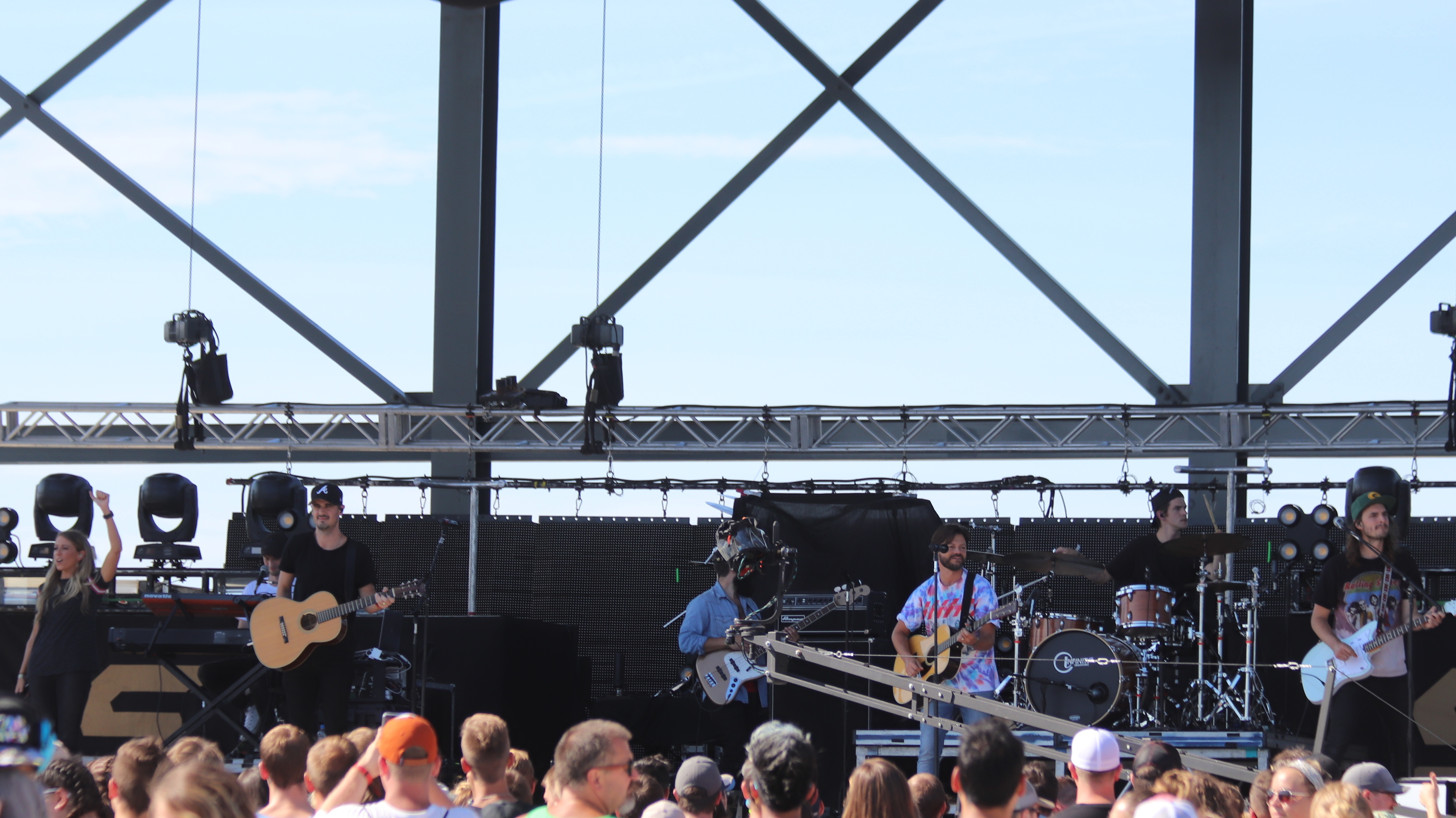
- Studio albums: 2
- EPs: 24
- Live albums: 13
- Singles: 28

The discography of Passion, an American contemporary worship music collective, consists of two studio albums, twenty-four live albums, one Spanish rerecorded album, and twenty-eight singles.

== Albums ==
=== Studio albums ===
Title	Details	Peak chart positions		
Title	Details	US	US Christ.	UK C&G
The Road to One Day	Label: Sparrow Records/Sixstepsrecords; Released: March 14, 2000; Formats: CD, digital download, streaming	139	3	—
Salvation's Tide Is Rising	Label: Sparrow/Sixsteps; Released: January 1, 2016; Formats: CD, digital download, streaming	19	1	9
"—" denotes a recording that did not chart or was not released in that territory.

=== Live albums ===
Title	Details	Peak chart positions		
Title	Details	US	US Christ.	UK C&G
Our Soul's Desire	Released: January 1, 1997; Label: Star Song Communications; Formats: CD, digital download, streaming	—	—	—
Live Worship from the 268 Generation	Label: Sparrow/Sixsteps; Released: July 20, 1998; Formats: CD, digital download, streaming	—	—	—
Better Is One Day	Label: Sparrow/Sixsteps; Released: April 23, 1999; Formats: CD, digital download, streaming	—	4	—
One Day Live	Label: Sparrow/Sixsteps; Released: October 27, 2000; Formats: CD, digital download, streaming	158	12	—
Our Love Is Loud	Label: Sparrow/Sixsteps; Released: April 9, 2002; Formats: CD, digital download, streaming	77	4	—
Sacred Revolution	Label: Sparrow/Sixsteps; Released: August 19, 2003; Formats: CD, digital download, streaming	107	5	—
Hymns Ancient and Modern	Label: Sparrow/Sixsteps; Released: February 24, 2004; Formats: CD, digital download, streaming	163	8	—
How Great Is Our God	Label: Sparrow/Sixsteps; Released: April 12, 2005; Formats: CD, digital download, streaming	74	2	—
Everything Glorious	Label: Sparrow/Sixsteps; Released: May 27, 2006; Formats: CD, digital download, streaming	69	2	—
God of This City	Label: Sparrow/Sixsteps; Released: February 5, 2008; Formats: CD, digital download, streaming	74	3	—
Awakening	Label: Sparrow/Sixsteps; Released: March 11, 2010; Formats: CD, digital download, streaming	15	1	—
Here for You	Label: Sparrow/Sixsteps; Released: March 8, 2011; Formats: CD, digital download, streaming	11	1	—
White Flag	Label: Sparrow/Sixsteps; Released: March 13, 2012; Formats: CD, digital download, streaming	5	1	—
Let the Future Begin	Label: Sparrow/Sixsteps; Released: March 12, 2013; Formats: CD, digital download, streaming	4	1	3
Take It All	Label: Sparrow/Sixsteps; Released: April 29, 2014; Formats: CD, digital download, streaming	4	1	3
Even So Come	Label: Sparrow/Sixsteps; Released: March 17, 2015; Formats: CD, digital download, streaming	18	1	3
Worthy of Your Name	Label: Sparrow/Sixsteps; Released: February 17, 2017; Formats: CD, digital download, streaming	32	1	—
Whole Heart	Label: Sparrow/Sixsteps; Released: February 23, 2018; Formats: CD, LP, digital download, streaming	37	1	—
Follow You Anywhere	Label: Sparrow/Sixsteps; Released: January 3, 2019; Formats: CD, digital download, streaming	— (Note: Follow You Anywhere did not enter the Billboard 200, but peaked at No. 47 on the Top Album Sales chart.)	3	—
Roar	Label: Sparrow/Sixsteps; Released: March 6, 2020; Formats: CD, digital download, streaming	— (Note: Roar did not enter the Billboard 200, but peaked at No. 68 on the Top Album Sales chart.)	5	—
Burn Bright	Label: Sparrow/Sixsteps; Released: February 18, 2022; Formats: CD, digital download, streaming	—	—	—
I've Witnessed It	Label: Sparrow/Sixsteps; Released: March 10, 2023; Formats: CD, digital download, streaming	—	47	—
Call On Heaven	Label: Sparrow/Sixsteps; Released: March 1, 2024; Formats: CD, digital download, streaming	—	11	13
Just That Good	Label: Sparrow/Sixsteps; Released: March 6, 2026; Formats: CD, digital download, streaming	—	—	—
"—" denotes a recording that did not chart or was not released in that territory.

=== Spanish albums ===
Title	Details	Peak chart positions
Title	Details	US Latin Pop
Glorioso Día	Label: Sparrow/Sixsteps; Release date: September 1, 2017; Formats: CD, digital download, streaming	12

=== Compilations and other releases ===
Title	Details	Peak chart positions	
Title	Details	US	US Christ.
Passion 05	Released: 2005; Label: Independent; Formats: Digital download	—	—
The Early Session	Released: February 28, 2006; Label: Sixsteps; Formats: Digital download, streaming	—	—
The Best of Passion (So Far)	Released: December 26, 2006; Label: Sparrow/Sixstephs; Formats: CD	168	9
Live from Passion07	Released: 2007; Label: Independent; Formats: Digital download	—	—
A Generation United for His Renown	Released: May 20, 2008; Label: EMI Records, Capitol CMG; Formats: CD	—	—
Passion: The Essential Collection	Released: November 10, 2014; Label: Capitol CMG; Formats: CD, DVD	133	9
"—" denotes a recording that did not chart or was not released in that territory.

== Singles ==
Title	Year	Peak chart positions			Certifications	Album
Title	Year	US Christ.	US Christ. Air.	US Christ. Digital	Certifications	Album
"White Flag" (featuring Chris Tomlin)	2012	8		3		White Flag
"One Thing Remains" (featuring Kristian Stanfill)	2012	1		6	RIAA: Gold	White Flag
"The Lord Our God" (featuring Kristian Stanfill)	2013	18		—		Let the Future Begin
"In Christ Alone" (featuring Kristian Stanfill)	2014	32	25	—		Let the Future Begin
"My Heart Is Yours" (featuring Kristian Stanfill)	2014	13	12	32		Take It All
"Even So Come" (featuring Kristian Stanfill)	2015	7	3	—	RIAA: Gold	Even So Come
"Remember" (featuring Brett Younker & Melodie Malone)	2016	16	16	27		Salvation's Tide Is Rising
"Simple Pursuit" (featuring Kristian Stanfill)	2016	41	27	—		Salvation's Tide Is Rising
"Glorious Day" (featuring Kristian Stanfill)	2017	25	19	14	RIAA: Gold	Worthy of Your Name
"God, You're So Good" (featuring Kristian Stanfill & Melodie Malone)	2018	—	42	—		Whole Heart
"God, You're So Good" (featuring Travis Greene)	2018	—	—	—		Non-album single
"Follow You Anywhere" (featuring Kristian Stanfill)	2019	45	38	—		Follow You Anywhere
"Step into the Light" (featuring Sean Curran)	2019	—	—	—		Bigger Than I Thought
"Behold the Lamb" (featuring Kristian Stanfill)	2019	—	—	—		Follow You Anywhere
"There's Nothing That Our God Can't Do" (featuring Kristian Stanfill)	2019	32	31	—		Roar
"King of Glory" (featuring Kristian Stanfill)	2019	44	—	—		Roar
"Way Maker" (featuring Kristian Stanfill, Kari Jobe, and Cody Carnes)	2020	39	—	9		Roar
"Raise a Hallelujah" (featuring Brett Younker)	2020	—	—	—		Roar
"There's Nothing That Our God Can't Do" (featuring Kristian Stanfill)	2020	—	—	—		Roar
"O Holy Night" (featuring Crowder)	2021	—	—	—		Hope Has a Name (EP)
"Grace of God with Us" (featuring Chidima)	2021	—	—	—		Hope Has a Name (EP)
"What He's Done" (featuring Tasha Cobbs Leonard and Anna Golden)	2022	—	—	—		Burn Bright
"I've Witnessed It" (featuring Melodie Malone)	2023	—	—	—		I've Witnessed It
"He Who Is to Come" (featuring Kristian Stanfill and Cody Carnes)	2023	—	—	—		Call On Heaven
"The Lord Will Provide" (featuring Landon Wolfe)	2024	30	16	—		Call On Heaven
"Garment of Praise" (featuring Brooke Ligertwood)	2025	—	—	—		Non-album single
"The Blood" (featuring JJ Hasulube)	2026	49	—	—		Just That Good
"What a Worthy Name" (featuring Chidima)	2026	—	—	—		Just That Good
"Just That Good" (featuring Kristian Stanfil)	2026	27	14	—		Just That Good
"—" denotes a recording that did not chart or was not released in that territory.

== Other charted songs ==
Title	Year	Peak chart positions		Album
Title	Year	US Christ	US Christ Digital	Album
"Burning in My Soul" (featuring Brett Younker)	2013	—	41	Let The Future Begin
"Come as You Are" (featuring Crowder)	2014	43	24	Take It All
"Salvation's Tide" (featuring Kristian Stanfill)	2016	—	46	Salvation's Tide Is Rising
"Worthy of Your Name" (featuring Sean Curran)	2017	27	8	Worthy of Your Name
"This We Know" (featuring Kristian Stanfill)	2017	35	22	Worthy of Your Name
"How Great Is Your Love" (featuring Kristian Stanfill)	2017	50	—	Worthy of Your Name
"Whole Heart" (featuring Kristian Stanfill)	2018	48	—	Whole Heart
"Reckless Love" (featuring Melodie Malone)	2018	31	—	Whole Heart
"Welcome the Healer" (featuring Sean Curran)	2019	42	—	Follow You Anywhere
"Bigger Than I Thought" (featuring Sean Curran)	2019	44	—	Follow You Anywhere
