= List of Billboard Top Christian Albums number ones of the 2010s =

The Top Christian Albums chart is a record chart compiled by Billboard magazine, ranking the week's best-performing Christian albums in the United States. Like the Billboard 200, the data is compiled by Nielsen Soundscan based on each album's weekly physical and digital sales, as well as on-demand streaming and digital sales of its individual tracks.

During the decade, 204 albums reached the top of the chart. Lauren Daigle was the most-successful artist of the decade. Three albums by her topped the chart for 71 weeks during the 2010s. Look Up Child (2018) topped the year end charts of 2018 and 2019, while How Can It Be (2015) was the most successful album of the decade.

== Number-ones ==
Key
| † | Best-performing album of respective years |
| ‡ | Best-performing album of the decade |

| No. | Issue date | Album | Artist(s) | Wks. |
|---|---|---|---|---|
| re | January 3, 2010 | Until the Whole World Hears (Note: Best-performing album on the Top Christian Albums chart of 2010.) † | Casting Crowns | 2 |
| 223 | January 17, 2010 | Speaking Louder Than Before | Jeremy Camp | 1 |
| re | January 24, 2010 | Until the Whole World Hears † | Casting Crowns | 2 |
| 224 | February 7, 2010 | Downtown Church | Patty Griffin | 1 |
| re | February 14, 2010 | Awake | Skillet | 1 |
| 225 | February 21, 2010 | Tonight | tobyMac | 4 |
| 226 | March 21, 2010 | Passion: Awakening | Passion | 1 |
| re | March 28, 2010 | Tonight | tobyMac | 3 |
| re | April 18, 2010 | Awake | Skillet | 2 |
| re | May 2, 2010 | Until the Whole World Hears † | Casting Crowns | 1 |
| re | May 16, 2010 | Awake | Skillet | 1 |
| 227 | May 16, 2010 | The Generous Mr. Lovewell | MercyMe | 1 |
| 228 | May 23, 2010 | The Light Meets the Dark | Tenth Avenue North | 1 |
| re | May 30, 2010 | The Generous Mr. Lovewell | MercyMe | 5 |
| 229 | July 4, 2010 | Between Two Worlds | Trip Lee | 1 |
| 230 | July 11, 2010 | A Beautiful Exchange | Hillsong Live | 1 |
| re | July 18, 2010 | Awake | Skillet | 1 |
| 231 | July 25, 2010 | Born Again | Newsboys | 2 |
| 232 | August 8, 2010 | My Paper Heart (Deluxe Version) | Francesca Battistelli | 4 |
| 233 | September 5, 2010 | We Cry Out: The Worship Project | Jeremy Camp | 1 |
| 234 | September 12, 2010 | Love God. Love People. The London Sessions | Israel Houghton | 1 |
| 235 | September 19, 2010 | Dark Is the Way, Light Is a Place | Anberlin | 1 |
| 236 | September 26, 2010 | Horseshoes and Hand Grenades | Disciple | 1 |
| 237 | October 3, 2010 | We Cry Out: The Worship Project | Jeremy Camp | 1 |
| 238 | October 10, 2010 | Rehab | Lecrae | 1 |
| 239 | October 17, 2010 | WOW Hits 2011 | Various artists | 2 |
| 240 | October 31, 2010 | Move | Third Day | 2 |
| 241 | November 14, 2010 | WOW Hits 2011 | Various artists | 1 |
| 242 | November 21, 2010 | Ø (Disambiguation) | Underoath | 1 |
| 243 | November 28, 2010 | And If Our God Is for Us... (Note: Best-performing album on the Top Christian Albums chart of 2011.) † | Chris Tomlin | 3 |
| re | December 19, 2010 | WOW Hits 2011 | Various artists | 3 |
| re | January 9, 2011 | And If Our God Is for Us... † | Chris Tomlin | 2 |
| re | January 23, 2011 | Rehab | Lecrae | 1 |
| 244 | January 30, 2011 | Leaving Eden | Brandon Heath | 1 |
| re | February 6, 2011 | WOW Hits 2011 | Various artists | 1 |
| 245 | February 19, 2011 | Until We Have Faces | Red | 2 |
| 246 | February 26, 2011 | Aftermath | Hillsong United | 2 |
| 247 | March 12, 2011 | Hundred More Years | Francesca Battistelli | 1 |
| 248 | March 19, 2011 | Passion: Here For You | Passion | 1 |
| 249 | March 26, 2011 | Until the Whole World Hears † | Casting Crowns | 6 |
| re | May 8, 2011 | Awake | Skillet | 1 |
| re | May 15, 2011 | Hundred More Years | Francesca Battistelli | 1 |
| re | May 22, 2011 | Born Again | Newsboys | 1 |
| 250 | May 29, 2011 | One True God | NewSong | 1 |
| 251 | June 5, 2011 | Blacklight | Tedashii | 2 |
| re | June 25, 2011 | Awake | Skillet | 1 |
| 252 | July 2, 2011 | This Is the Christ | Mormon Tabernacle Choir | 1 |
| 253 | July 9, 2011 | Leveler | August Burns Red | 3 |
| 254 | July 30, 2011 | 10,000 Reasons | Matt Redman | 1 |
| re | August 6, 2011 | Awake | Skillet | 1 |
| 255 | August 13, 2011 | God Is Able | Hillsong Live | 1 |
| 256 | August 20, 2011 | Young Love | Mat Kearney | 3 |
| 257 | September 10, 2011 | Dying To Live | PRo | 1 |
| 258 | September 17, 2011 | Until the Whole World Hears † | Casting Crowns | 2 |
| 259 | October 1, 2011 | Dead Throne | The Devil Wears Prada | 1 |
| 260 | October 8, 2011 | The Reckoning | needtobreathe | 1 |
| 261 | October 15, 2011 | Vice Verses | Switchfoot | 2 |
| 262 | October 29, 2011 | WOW Hits 2012 | Various artists | 1 |
| 263 | November 5, 2011 | Come to the Well (Note: Best-performing album on the Top Christian Albums chart of 2012.) † | Casting Crowns | 4 |
| re | December 3, 2011 | WOW Hits 2012 | Various artists | 1 |
| re | December 10, 2011 | Come to the Well † | Casting Crowns | 7 |
| 264 | January 28, 2012 | Give Us Rest | David Crowder Band | 1 |
| 265 | February 4, 2012 | Joyful Noise | Soundtrack | 1 |
| 266 | February 11, 2012 | Where I Find You | Kari Jobe | 2 |
| 267 | February 25, 2012 | Move | Third Day | 1 |
| 268 | March 3, 2012 | Live in Miami (Welcome to the Aftermath) | Hillsong United | 1 |
| re | March 10, 2012 | Come to the Well † | Casting Crowns | 1 |
| 269 | March 17, 2012 | Believer | Kutless | 1 |
| 270 | March 24, 2012 | Now | Fireflight | 1 |
| 271 | March 31, 2012 | Passion: White Flag | Passion | 1 |
| 272 | April 7, 2012 | Top 25 Praise Songs: 2012 Edition | Maranatha Praise Band | 1 |
| 273 | April 14, 2012 | Gold | Britt Nicole | 1 |
| re | April 21, 2012 | Come to the Well † | Casting Crowns | 1 |
| 274 | April 28, 2012 | The Good Life | Trip Lee | 1 |
| 275 | May 5, 2012 | The End Is Where We Begin | Thousand Foot Krutch | 1 |
| 276 | May 12, 2012 | Blessings | Laura Story | 3 |
| 277 | June 2, 2012 | Ten Stories | MewithoutYou | 1 |
| 278 | June 9, 2012 | The Hurt & the Healer | MercyMe | 1 |
| 279 | June 16, 2012 | Immortal | For Today | 1 |
| re | June 23, 2012 | The Hurt & the Healer | MercyMe | 1 |
| 280 | June 30, 2012 | Courageous | Soundtrack | 1 |
| re | July 7, 2012 | The Hurt & the Healer | MercyMe | 2 |
| 281 | July 21, 2012 | Live: Cornerstone | Hillsong United | 1 |
| 282 | July 28, 2012 | Murdered Love | P.O.D. | 1 |
| 283 | August 4, 2012 | Weight & Glory | KB | 1 |
| 284 | August 11, 2012 | God's Not Dead | Newsboys | 1 |
| 285 | August 18, 2012 | 10,000 Reasons | Matt Redman | 2 |
| 286 | September 1, 2012 | Jesus at the Center: Live | Israel & New Breed | 1 |
| 287 | September 8, 2012 | The Struggle | Tenth Avenue North | 1 |
| 288 | September 15, 2012 | Eye on It | tobyMac | 1 |
| 289 | September 22, 2012 | Gravity | Lecrae | 2 |
| re | October 6, 2012 | Eye on It | tobyMac | 1 |
| 290 | October 13, 2012 | WOW Hits 2013 (Note: Best-performing album on the Top Christian Albums chart of 2013.) † | Various artists | 3 |
| 291 | November 3, 2012 | Vital | Anberlin | 1 |
| re | November 10, 2012 | Come to the Well † | Casting Crowns | 1 |
| 292 | November 17, 2012 | New Horizons | Flyleaf | 1 |
| 293 | November 24, 2012 | Miracle | Third Day | 2 |
| re | December 8, 2012 | WOW Hits 2013 † | Various artists | 7 |
| 294 | January 26, 2013 | Burning Lights | Chris Tomlin | 3 |
| 295 | February 16, 2013 | A Messenger | Colton Dixon | 1 |
| 296 | February 23, 2013 | Release the Panic | Red | 1 |
| 297 | March 2, 2013 | Reckless | Jeremy Camp | 1 |
| 298 | March 9, 2013 | Nothing Is Wasted | Elevation Worship | 1 |
| 299 | March 16, 2013 | Zion | Hillsong United | 2 |
| 300 | March 30, 2013 | Let the Future Begin | Passion | 2 |
| 301 | April 13, 2013 | Precious Memories Volume II | Alan Jackson | 3 |
| 302 | May 4, 2013 | Heroes For Sale | Andy Mineo | 1 |
| re | May 11, 2013 | Precious Memories Volume II | Alan Jackson | 3 |
| 303 | June 1, 2013 | How Mercy Looks from Here | Amy Grant | 3 |
| 304 | June 22, 2013 | We Won't Be Shaken | Building 429 | 1 |
| re | June 29, 2013 | Precious Memories Volume II | Alan Jackson | 2 |
| 305 | July 13, 2013 | Rise | Skillet | 6 |
| 306 | August 24, 2013 | Wrongdoers | Norma Jean | 1 |
| re | August 31, 2013 | Rise | Skillet | 2 |
| 307 | September 14, 2013 | Overcomer | Mandisa | 1 |
| 308 | September 21, 2013 | Tides | Bethel Music | 1 |
| 309 | September 28, 2013 | Restart | Newsboys | 1 |
| 310 | October 5, 2013 | 8:18 | The Devil Wears Prada | 1 |
| 311 | October 12, 2013 | Your Grace Finds Me | Matt Redman | 1 |
| 312 | October 19, 2013 | We Are Young & Free | Hillsong Young & Free | 1 |
| 313 | October 26, 2013 | WOW Hits 2014 | Various artists | 1 |
| 314 | November 2, 2013 | Hurricane | Natalie Grant | 1 |
| re | November 9, 2013 | WOW Hits 2014 | Various artists | 2 |
| 315 | November 23, 2013 | Church Clothes Vol. 2 | Lecrae | 1 |
| re | November 30, 2013 | WOW Hits 2014 | Various artists | 9 |
| 316 | February 1, 2014 | Fading West | Switchfoot | 2 |
| 317 | February 15, 2014 | Thrive (Note: Best-performing album on the Top Christian Albums chart of 2014.) † | Casting Crowns | 4 |
| re | March 15, 2014 | Tides Live | Bethel Music | 1 |
| 318 | March 22, 2014 | 100 | KB | 1 |
| re | March 29, 2014 | Thrive † | Casting Crowns | 1 |
| 319 | April 5, 2014 | The Art of Celebration | Rend Collective | 1 |
| 320 | April 12, 2014 | Majestic | Kari Jobe | 1 |
| 321 | April 19, 2014 | Hymns | Michael W. Smith | 1 |
| 322 | April 26, 2014 | Welcome to the New | MercyMe | 1 |
| 323 | May 3, 2014 | Rivers in the Wasteland | Needtobreathe | 1 |
| 324 | May 10, 2014 | You Make Me Brave: Live at the Civic | Bethel Music | 1 |
| 325 | May 17, 2014 | Passion: Take It All | Passion | 1 |
| re | May 24, 2014 | Thrive † | Casting Crowns | 1 |
| re | May 31, 2014 | Hymns | Michael W. Smith | 2 |
| 326 | June 14, 2014 | Neon Steeple | Crowder | 1 |
| 327 | June 21, 2014 | Unstoppable Love | Jesus Culture | 1 |
| re | June 28, 2014 | Neon Steeple | Crowder | 1 |
| 328 | July 5, 2014 | Welcome to the New | MercyMe | 1 |
| 329 | July 12, 2014 | Hope in Front of Me | Danny Gokey | 1 |
| 330 | July 19, 2014 | No Other Name | Hillsong Worship | 2 |
| re | August 2, 2014 | Zion | Hillsong United | 1 |
| 331 | August 9, 2014 | Lowborn | Anberlin | 1 |
| re | August 16, 2014 | Zion | Hillsong United | 1 |
| 332 | August 23, 2014 | Time Stands Still | Family Force 5 | 1 |
| re | August 30, 2014 | Zion | Hillsong United | 1 |
| 333 | September 6, 2014 | Anchor | Colton Dixon | 1 |
| 334 | September 13, 2014 | Oxygen : Inhale | Thousand Foot Krutch | 1 |
| 335 | September 20, 2014 | Welcome to the New | MercyMe | 1 |
| 336 | September 27, 2014 | Anomaly | Lecrae | 3 |
| 337 | October 18, 2014 | WOW Hits 2015 (Note: Best-performing album on the Top Christian Albums chart of 2015.) † | Various artist | 4 |
| 338 | November 15, 2014 | Love Ran Red | Chris Tomlin | 2 |
| 339 | November 29, 2014 | Cathedrals | Tenth Avenue North | 1 |
| 340 | December 6, 2014 | The Spirit of Christmas | Michael W. Smith | 1 |
| 341 | December 13, 2014 | Wake Up the Wonder | Elevation Worship | 1 |
| 342 | December 20, 2014 | The Spirit of Christmas | Michael W. Smith | 3 |
| re | January 10, 2015 | WOW Hits 2015 † | Various artists | 3 |
| 343 | January 31, 2015 | This Is Living (EP) | Hillsong Young & Free | 1 |
| 344 | February 7, 2015 | Church Songs | Vertical Church Band | 1 |
| 345 | February 14, 2015 | We Will Not Be Shaken | Bethel Music | 1 |
| 346 | February 21, 2015 | I Will Follow | Jeremy Camp | 2 |
| re | March 7, 2015 | We Will Not Be Shaken | Bethel Music | 1 |
| 347 | March 14, 2015 | Of Beauty and Rage | Red | 1 |
| 348 | March 21, 2015 | Lead Us Back: Songs of Worship | Third Day | 2 |
| 349 | April 4, 2015 | Even So Come | Passion | 1 |
| re | April 11, 2015 | Lead Us Back: Songs of Worship | Third Day | 1 |
| 350 | April 18, 2015 | Mansion | NF | 1 |
| 351 | April 25, 2015 | Invader | Rapture Ruckus | 1 |
| 352 | May 2, 2015 | How Can It Be (Note: Best-performing album on the Top Christian Albums chart of 2017.) (Note: Best-performing album on the Top Christian Albums chart of the 2010s.) ‡ † | Lauren Daigle | 1 |
| 353 | May 9, 2015 | Tomorrow We Live | KB | 1 |
| 354 | May 16, 2015 | Live Forever | Matthew West | 1 |
| 355 | May 23, 2015 | Sound of the Saints | Audio Adrenaline | 1 |
| 356 | May 30, 2015 | Sing Along 3 | Phil Wickham | 1 |
| 357 | June 6, 2015 | You Were Never Alone | Emery | 1 |
| 358 | June 13, 2015 | Empires | Hillsong United | 3 |
| 359 | July 4, 2015 | Unbroken Praise | Matt Redman | 1 |
| re | July 11, 2015 | Empires | Hillsong United | 1 |
| 360 | July 18, 2015 | Found in Far Away Places | August Burns Red | 2 |
| re | August 1, 2015 | Empires | Hillsong United | 1 |
| re | August 8, 2015 | Majestic | Kari Jobe | 1 |
| 361 | August 15, 2015 | Covered: Alive in Asia | Israel & New Breed | 2 |
| 362 | August 29, 2015 | This Is Not a Test | tobyMac | 2 |
| 363 | September 12, 2015 | As Family We Go | Rend Collective | 1 |
| re | September 19, 2015 | This Is Not a Test | tobyMac | 2 |
| 364 | October 3, 2015 | Marty for President | Marty | 1 |
| 365 | October 10, 2015 | Uncomfortable | Andy Mineo | 1 |
| 366 | October 17, 2015 | Brave New World | Amanda Cook | 1 |
| 367 | October 24, 2015 | Walls | Gateway Worship | 1 |
| 368 | October 31, 2015 | WOW Hits 2016 | Various artists | 1 |
| 369 | November 7, 2015 | Open Heaven / River Wild | Hillsong Worship | 1 |
| 370 | November 14, 2015 | Adore: Christmas Songs of Worship | Chris Tomlin | 1 |
| re | November 21, 2015 | WOW Hits 2016 | Various artists | 1 |
| re | November 28, 2015 | Adore: Christmas Songs of Worship | Chris Tomlin | 1 |
| 371 | December 5, 2015 | Be One | Natalie Grant | 1 |
| re | December 12, 2015 | Adore: Christmas Songs of Worship | Chris Tomlin | 4 |
| 372 | January 9, 2016 | MercyMe, It's Christmas! | MercyMe | 1 |
| re | January 16, 2016 | How Can It Be † ‡ | Lauren Daigle | 1 |
| 373 | January 23, 2016 | Passion: Salvation's Tide Is Rising | Passion | 1 |
| re | January 30, 2016 | How Can It Be † ‡ | Lauren Daigle | 1 |
| 374 | February 6, 2016 | Church Clothes 3 | Lecrae | 1 |
| re | February 13, 2016 | How Can It Be † ‡ | Lauren Daigle | 2 |
| 375 | February 27, 2016 | Here as in Heaven | Elevation Worship | 1 |
| 376 | March 5, 2016 | Hymns That Are Important to Us (Note: Best-performing album on the Top Christian Albums chart of 2016.) † | Joey + Rory | 10 |
| 377 | May 14, 2016 | Therapy Session | NF | 1 |
| re | May 21, 2016 | Hymns That Are Important to Us † | Joey + Rory | 5 |
| 378 | June 25, 2016 | Every Nation | Linda Conant & the Circuit Riders | 1 |
| re | July 2, 2016 | Hymns That Are Important to Us † | Joey + Rory | 1 |
| 379 | July 9, 2016 | Exhale | Thousand Foot Krutch | 1 |
| re | July 16, 2016 | Hymns That Are Important to Us † | Joey + Rory | 1 |
| 380 | July 23, 2016 | Everything Was Sound | Silent Planet | 1 |
| 381 | July 30, 2016 | Where the Light Shines Through | Switchfoot | 1 |
| 382 | August 6, 2016 | Hard Love | Needtobreathe | 1 |
| 383 | August 13, 2016 | Air for Free | Relient K | 1 |
| 384 | August 20, 2016 | Love Remains | Hillary Scott and the Scott Family | 1 |
| 385 | August 27, 2016 | Unleashed | Skillet | 3 |
| 386 | September 17, 2016 | One Sided War | Michael Sweet | 1 |
| re | September 24, 2016 | Hymns That Are Important to Us † | Joey + Rory | 1 |
| re | October 1, 2016 | Unleashed | Skillet | 1 |
| 387 | October 8, 2016 | The Very Next Thing | Casting Crowns | 1 |
| 388 | October 15, 2016 | American Prodigal | Crowder | 1 |
| 389 | October 22, 2016 | Beautiful Surrender | Jonathan David and Melissa Helser | 1 |
| 390 | October 29, 2016 | WOW Hits 2017 | Various artists | 1 |
| 391 | November 5, 2016 | Let There Be Light | Hillsong Worship | 1 |
| 392 | November 12, 2016 | Never Lose Sight | Chris Tomlin | 1 |
| re | November 19, 2016 | How Can It Be † ‡ | Lauren Daigle | 1 |
| 393 | November 26, 2016 | Tennessee Christmas | Amy Grant | 1 |
| 394 | December 3, 2016 | Full Of (Even More) Cheer | Home Free | 1 |
| re | December 10, 2016 | Tennessee Christmas | Amy Grant | 3 |
| 395 | December 31, 2016 | Behold: A Christmas Collection | Lauren Daigle | 1 |
| re | January 7, 2017 | WOW Hits 2017 | Various artists | 2 |
| 396 | January 21, 2017 | Maranatha! Music: Top 25 Praise Songs, 2017 Edition | Various artists | 2 |
| 397 | February 4, 2017 | Rise | Danny Gokey | 1 |
| re | February 11, 2017 | How Can It Be † ‡ | Lauren Daigle | 1 |
| 398 | February 18, 2017 | After All These Years | Brian and Jenn Johnson | 1 |
| 399 | February 25, 2017 | Sing It Now: Songs of Faith & Hope | Reba McEntire | 2 |
| 400 | March 11, 2017 | Worthy of Your Name | Passion | 1 |
| 401 | March 18, 2017 | The Shack: Music from and Inspired by the Motion Picture | Soundtrack | 2 |
| re | April 1, 2017 | Sing It Now: Songs of Faith & Hope | Reba McEntire | 1 |
| 402 | April 8, 2017 | There Is a Cloud | Elevation Worship | 1 |
| 403 | April 15, 2017 | Identity | Colton Dixon | 1 |
| 404 | April 22, 2017 | Lifer | MercyMe | 1 |
| 405 | April 29, 2017 | Starlight: Recorded Live On Tour | Bethel Music | 1 |
| re | May 6, 2017 | Lifer | MercyMe | 1 |
| 406 | May 13, 2017 | On My Side | Kim Walker-Smith | 1 |
| re | May 20, 2017 | Lifer | MercyMe | 3 |
| 407 | June 10, 2017 | Out of the Dark | Mandisa | 1 |
| re | June 17, 2017 | Lifer | MercyMe | 2 |
| 408 | July 1, 2017 | Wonder | Hillsong United | 4 |
| re | July 29, 2017 | Lifer | MercyMe | 2 |
| re | August 12, 2017 | Wonder | Hillsong United | 1 |
| 409 | August 19, 2017 | Every Mile Mattered | Nichole Nordeman | 1 |
| 410 | August 26, 2017 | Andy Mineo and Wordsplayed Present Magic & Bird | Andy Mineo and Wordsplayed | 1 |
| 411 | September 2, 2017 | Love Has a Name | Jesus Culture | 1 |
| re | September 9, 2017 | How Can It Be † ‡ | Lauren Daigle | 2 |
| 412 | September 23, 2017 | Mercury & Lightning | John Mark McMillan | 1 |
| re | September 30, 2017 | How Can It Be † ‡ | Lauren Daigle | 2 |
| 413 | October 14, 2017 | All Things Work Together | Lecrae | 2 |
| 414 | October 28, 2017 | Phantom Anthem | August Burns Red | 1 |
| 415 | November 4, 2017 | Precious Memories Collection | Alan Jackson | 1 |
| 416 | November 11, 2017 | Today We Rebel | KB | 1 |
| 417 | November 18, 2017 | Gone | Red | 1 |
| re | November 25, 2017 | Behold: A Christmas Collection | Lauren Daigle | 1 |
| re | December 2, 2017 | Precious Memories Collection | Alan Jackson | 2 |
| re | December 16, 2017 | Behold: A Christmas Collection | Lauren Daigle | 3 |
| re | January 3, 2018 | Precious Memories Collection | Alan Jackson | 5 |
| 418 | February 3, 2018 | Good News | Rend Collective | 1 |
| 419 | February 10, 2018 | Reckless Love | Cory Asbury | 1 |
| re | February 17, 2018 | Precious Memories Collection | Alan Jackson | 1 |
| 420 | February 24, 2018 | Therapy Session | NF | 2 |
| 421 | March 10, 2018 | Whole Heart | Passion | 1 |
| 422 | March 17, 2018 | I Can Only Imagine: The Very Best of MercyMe | MercyMe | 1 |
| re | March 24, 2018 | Precious Memories Collection | Alan Jackson | 1 |
| re | March 31, 2018 | I Can Only Imagine: The Very Best of MercyMe | MercyMe | 1 |
| 423 | April 7, 2018 | Future | Jordan Feliz | 1 |
| re | April 14, 2018 | I Can Only Imagine: The Very Best of MercyMe | MercyMe | 12 |
| 424 | July 7, 2018 | Let the Trap Say Amen | Lecrae X Zaytoven | 1 |
| 425 | July 14, 2018 | I Can Only Imagine: The Very Best of MercyMe | MercyMe | 5 |
| 426 | August 18, 2018 | Living Hope | Phil Wickham | 1 |
| 427 | August 25, 2018 | Where No One Stands Alone | Elvis Presley | 2 |
| re | September 8, 2018 | How Can It Be † ‡ | Lauren Daigle | 1 |
| 428 | September 15, 2018 | Living With a Fire | Jesus Culture | 1 |
| 429 | September 22, 2018 | Look Up Child (Note: Best-performing album on the Top Christian Albums chart of 2018 and 2019.) † | Lauren Daigle | 4 |
| 430 | October 20, 2018 | Burn the Ships | for King & Country | 1 |
| 431 | October 27, 2018 | The Elements | tobyMac | 1 |
| re | November 3, 2018 | Look Up Child † | Lauren Daigle | 37 |
| 432 | May 11, 2019 | People | Hillsong United | 1 |
| 433 | May 18, 2019 | A Thousand More | Thrive Worship | 1 |
| 434 | May 25, 2019 | United | Newsboys | 1 |
| re | June 1, 2019 | Look Up Child † | Lauren Daigle | 11 |
| 435 | August 17, 2019 | Victorious | Skillet | 1 |
| re | August 24, 2019 | Look Up Child † | Lauren Daigle | 6 |
| 436 | October 5, 2019 | The Story's Not Over | Jeremy Camp | 1 |
| re | October 12, 2019 | Look Up Child † | Lauren Daigle | 2 |
| 437 | October 26, 2019 | Awake | Hillsong Worship | 1 |
| re | November 2, 2019 | Look Up Child † | Lauren Daigle | 1 |
| 438 | November 9, 2019 | Jesus Is King | Kanye West | 7 |
| re | December 28, 2019 | Look Up Child † | Lauren Daigle | 3 |

== Statistics ==
The following artists have spent at least ten weeks atop the chart, with at least three albums:

| Artist | Wks. | Al. | Albums (Weeks) | Ref. |
|---|---|---|---|---|
| Lauren Daigle | 71 | 3 | How Can It Be (12); Behold: A Christmas Collection (5); Look Up Child (54) | |
| WOW series | 43 | 7 | WOW Hits 2011 (7); WOW Hits 2012 (2); WOW Hits 2013 (10); WOW Hits 2014 (12); WOW Hits 2015 (5); WOW Hits 2016 (2); WOW Hits 2017 (3) | |
| MercyMe | 42 | 6 | The Generous Mr. Lovewell (6); The Hurt & the Healer (4); Welcome to the New (3); MercyMe, It's Christmas! (1); Lifer (9); I Can Only Imagine: The Very Best of MercyMe (19) | |
| Casting Crowns | 34 | 4 | Until the Whole World Hears (13); Come to the Well (14); Thrive (6); The Very Next Thing (1) | |
| Skillet | 21 | 4 | Awake (8); Rise (8); Unleashed (4); Victorious (1) | |
| Chris Tomlin | 17 | 5 | And If Our God Is for Us... (5); Adore: Christmas Songs of Worship (6); Burning Lights (3); Love Ran Red (2); Never Lose Sight (1) | |
| Hillsong United | 19 | 6 | Aftermath (2); Live in Miami (Welcome to the Aftermath) (1); Zion (5); Empires (5); Wonder (5); People (1) | |
| tobyMac | 14 | 4 | Tonight (7); Eye on It (2); This Is Not a Test (5); The Elements (1) | |
| Lecrae | 12 | 7 | Rehab (2); Gravity (2); Church Clothes Vol. 2 (1); Anomaly (3); Church Clothes 3 (1); All Things Work Together (2); Let the Trap Say Amen (1) | |

The following albums have spent at least ten weeks atop the chart throughout the decade:

| Album | Wks. | Artist(s) | Ref. |
|---|---|---|---|
| Look Up Child | 54 | Lauren Daigle | |
| I Can Only Imagine: The Very Best of MercyMe | 19 | MercyMe | |
| Hymns That Are Important to Us | 18 | Joey + Rory | |
| WOW Hits 2014 | 14 | WOW series | |
| Come to the Well | 14 | Casting Crowns | |
| Until the Whole World Hears | 12 | Casting Crowns | |
| How Can It Be | 12 | Lauren Daigle | |

== See also ==
- List of Billboard Christian Songs number ones of the 2010s
