= Glorioso Día =

Studio album by Passion
- Released: September 1, 2017
- Recorded: 2017
- Genre: Worship; Latin Christian music
- Length: 51:59
- Language: Spanish
- Label: sixsteps

Passion chronology
Worthy of Your Name (2017)	Glorioso Día (2017)	Whole Heart (2018)

Glorioso Día is the first album in Spanish by American contemporary worship band Passion. Glorioso Dia is a collection of 10 worship songs that feature some of the most important worship hymns throughout the band's years. SixSteps Records released the album September 1, 2017.

== Critical reception ==
Professional ratings
Review scores
Source	Rating
365 Days of Inspiring Media	4.5/5 stars

Joshua Andre specifying in a four and a half star review for 365 Days of Inspiring Media, replies, "Glorioso Dia is an album that deserves to be bought on iTunes by many people, regardless if you know Spanish or not; I guarantee those who love worship music will love this record! God deserves all the praise for this spectacular album, and then some more!"

== Track list ==
NOTE: These songs are Spanish-language translations of Passion songs in English. The original English-language song is listed next to each title.

Glorioso Día
No.	Title	Writer(s)	Length
1.	"Glorioso Día (Glorious Day) (feat. Kristian Stanfill)"	Sean Curran / Jason Ingram / Jonathan Smith / Kristian Stanfill	4:20
2.	"Buen Padre (Good Good Father) (feat. Pat Barrett)"	Pat Barrett / Tony Brown	4:20
3.	"Diez Mil Razones (10,000 Reasons (Bless the Lord)) (feat. Kristian Stanfill)"	Jonas Myrin / Matt Redman	4:17
4.	"Eres Digno De Adorar (Worthy Of Your Name) (feat. Sean Curran)"	Brenton Brown / Sean Curran / Brett Younker	5:08
5.	"Corazón Rendido (Heart Abandoned) (feat. Kristian Stanfill)"	Sean Curran / Kristian Stanfill	7:14
6.	"Pronto Vendrás (Even So Come) (feat. Kristian Stanfill)"	Jess Cates / Jason Ingram / Chris Tomlin	4:12
7.	"Muestra Tu Gloria (Holy Ground) (feat. Melodie Malone)"	Mia Fieldes / Melodie Malone / Maurice Williams / Brett Younker	5:26
8.	"Cuán Grande Es Tu Amor (How Great Is Your Love) (feat. Jeff Johnson)"	Kristian Stanfill / Phil Wickham / Brett Younker	6:03
9.	"Construir Mi Vida (Build My Life) (feat. Brett Younker)"	Pat Barrett / Kirby Kaple / Karl Martin / Matt Redman / Brett Younker	6:34
10.	"Mi Corazón Es Tuyo (My Heart Is Yours) (feat. Kristian Stanfill)"	Daniel Carson / Jason Ingram / Kristian Stanfill / Brett Younker	4:25
Total length:			51:59

== Personnel ==
Adapted from AllMusic.

- Passion – primary artist
- Pat Barrett – composer, featured artist
- Sean Curran – composer, featured artist
- Melodie Malone – composer, featured artist
- Kristian Stanfill – composer, featured artist
- Brett Younker – composer, featured artist
- Jeff Johnson – featured artist
- Brenton Brown – composer
- Tony Brown – composer
- Daniel Carson – composer
- Jess Cates – composer
- Mia Fieldes – composer
- Jason Ingram – composer
- Kirby Kaple – composer
- Karl Martin – composer
- Jonas Myrin – composer
- Matt Redman – composer
- Jonathan Smith – composer
- Chris Tomlin – composer
- Phil Wickham – composer
- Maurice Williams – composer

== Chart performance ==
Chart (2017)	Peak position
US Latin Pop Albums (Billboard)	12
US Billboard 200	4
