= My Heart Is Yours (Passion song) =

Single by Passion

from the album Passion: Take It All
- Released: April 1, 2014
- Genre: Worship, CCM, Christian adult contemporary
- Length: 7:07
- Label: Sixsteps
- Songwriters: Daniel Carson; Jason Ingram; Kristian Stanfill; Judson W. Van DeVenter; Winfield Scott Weeden; Brett Younker
- Producers: Nathan Nockels; Brad O'Donnell; Louie Giglio; Shelley Giglio

Passion singles chronology
"In Christ Alone" (2014)	"My Heart Is Yours" (2014)	"Even So Come" (2015)

"My Heart Is Yours" is a worship song released by Passion as the lead single from their 2014 live album, Passion: Take It All, on April 1, 2014. It features live vocals from American Christian music singer and worship leader Kristian Stanfill. The song peaked at No. 13 on the Christian Songs Billboard chart and appeared on the 2012 year-end Christian Songs chart at No. 27. The song's bridge features lines from the popular hymn "I Surrender All" by Judson W. Van DeVenter and Winfield Scott. This song was also listed at No. 12 on Worship Leader's Top 20 Songs of 2014.

== Track listing ==
- Digital download
1. "My Heart Is Yours (feat. Kristian Stanfill)" – 7:07
- Digital download (radio version)
1. "My Heart Is Yours (feat. Kristian Stanfill) [Radio Version]" – 4:08

== Charts ==
=== Weekly charts ===
Chart (2014)	Peak position
US Christian AC Songs (Billboard)	18
US Christian AC Indicator (Billboard)	22
US Christian Airplay (Billboard)	12
US Hot Christian Songs (Billboard)	13
US Christian Digital Songs (Billboard)	32

=== Year-end charts ===
Chart (2012)	Peak position
US Christian Songs (Billboard)	27

Chart (2014)	Rank
US Christian AC (Billboard)	48
