= Our God (song) =

Single by Chris Tomlin

from the album And If Our God Is For Us...
- Released: February 26, 2010
- Genre: Worship
- Length: 5:28 (Passion live version); 4:35 (Passion radio version); 4:45 (Chris Tomlin album version)
- Label: sixsteps/Sparrow
- Songwriters: Chris Tomlin; Jesse Reeves; Ed Cash; Jonas Myrin
- Producer: Ed Cash

"Our God" is a song written by Chris Tomlin, Jesse Reeves, Jonas Myrin, and Matt Redman. The track was originally included on Passion: Awakening, a live record from Passion 10, the 2010 gathering of the Passion Conferences. It was released as a single and spent 10 weeks as No. 1 on Billboard Christian charts. The song is also the opening track on Tomlin's album And If Our God Is For Us... (2010) by CCM. In 2011, Chris Tomlin recorded a remix of the song featuring Christian rapper Lecrae.

One of Tomlin's co-writers Matt Redman recorded a version of the song on his 2012 compilation album, Sing Like Never Before: The Essential Collection.

== Awards ==
At the 2011 Dove Awards, Tomlin was nominated for Song of the Year, and won Worship Song of the Year for "Our God". Tomlin also performed the song at the awards ceremony.

That same year, And If Our God Is For Us... containing the song as its major hit was nominated in the category of Top Christian Album, the song won the title of Top Christian Song, and Tomlin won Top Christian Artist at the Billboard Music Awards.

"Our God" is the No. 5 song on CCLI's Top 25 Songs.

== Charts ==
=== Weekly charts ===
| Chart (2010) | Peak position |
|---|---|
| US Hot Christian Songs (Billboard) | 1 |

=== Year-end charts ===
| Chart (2010) | Position |
|---|---|
| US Billboard Hot Christian Songs | 5 |

=== Decade-end charts ===
| Chart (2010s) | Position |
|---|---|
| US Christian Songs (Billboard) | 46 |

== Certifications ==
| Region | Certification | Certified units/sales |
|---|---|---|
| New Zealand (RMNZ) | Gold | 15,000^{‡} |
| United States (RIAA) | 2× Platinum | 2,000,000^{‡} |
^{‡} Sales+streaming figures based on certification alone.
