= WOW Hits 2016 =

- Original cover of deluxe edition.

Compilation album by Various artists
- Released: September 25, 2015
- Genre: CCM; Worship; pop rock
- Label: Sony; Capitol CMG; Provident; Word; Curb

WOW Hits compilation albums chronology
WOW Hits 2015 (2014)	WOW Hits 2016 (2015)	WOW Hits 2017 (2016)

WOW Hits 2016 is a two-disc compilation album featuring some of the biggest songs on Christian radio for 2014 and 2015. The standard edition features 33 tracks in total, and the deluxe edition features 39 in total. The compilation was released on September 25, 2015. The album has sold 140,000 copies in the United States as of August 2016.

== Track listing ==
Disc one
No.	Title	Artist (Album)	Length
1.	"Greater"	MercyMe (Welcome to the New)	4:05
2.	"Soul on Fire" (featuring All Sons & Daughters)	Third Day (Lead Us Back: Songs of Worship)	3:15
3.	"He Knows"	Jeremy Camp (I Will Follow)	3:26
4.	"Broken Together"	Casting Crowns (Thrive)	4:40
5.	"He Knows My Name"	Francesca Battistelli (If We're Honest)	3:26
6.	"Overwhelmed" (radio version)	Big Daddy Weave (Love Come to Life)	4:25
7.	"Jesus Loves Me"	Chris Tomlin (Love Ran Red)	3:31
8.	"Save My Life"	Sidewalk Prophets (Live Like That)	3:44
9.	"Even So Come" (featuring Kristian Stanfill) (radio version)	Passion (Even So Come)	4:11
10.	"Because He Lives (Amen)"	Matt Maher (Saints and Sinners)	3:18
11.	"I Am Not Alone" (radio version)	Kari Jobe (Majestic)	3:57
12.	"Day One"	Matthew West (Live Forever)	3:28
13.	"Something Beautiful"	Steven Curtis Chapman (The Glorious Unfolding)	3:02
14.	"Press On"	Mandisa (Overcomer)	3:16
15.	"Stars in the Night"	Tenth Avenue North (Cathedrals)	3:43
16.	"You Are Loved" (bonus track)	Stars Go Dim (Stars Go Dim)	3:25
17.	"From the Day" (bonus track)	I Am They (I Am They)	3:38

Disc one deluxe edition
No.	Title	Artist (Album)	Length
18.	"No Turning Back" (featuring All Sons & Daughters)	Brandon Heath (No Turning Back)	3:12
19.	"Brave"	Moriah Peters (Brave)	3:46
20.	"How Sweet the Sound"	Citizen Way (Love Is the Evidence)	3:40

Disc two
No.	Title	Artist (Album)	Length
1.	"Shoulders" (radio version)	for KING & COUNTRY (Run Wild. Live Free. Love Strong.)	4:06
2.	"Brother" (radio version)	NEEDTOBREATHE (Rivers in the Wasteland)	3:27
3.	"Touch the Sky"	Hillsong UNITED (Empires)	4:22
4.	"How Can It Be"	Lauren Daigle (How Can It Be)	4:19
5.	"Drops in the Ocean"	Hawk Nelson (Diamonds)	3:21
6.	"Beyond Me"	tobyMac (This Is Not a Test)	3:14
7.	"Do Life Big"	Jamie Grace (Ready to Fly)	3:05
8.	"Come As You Are" (radio version)	Crowder (Neon Steeple)	3:54
9.	"Lord I'm Ready Now"	Plumb (Exhale)	3:29
10.	"Impossible"	Building 429 (Unashamed)	3:40
11.	"Through All of It"	Colton Dixon (Anchor)	3:25
12.	"Start a Fire"	Unspoken (Unspoken)	3:05
13.	"Who I Am"	Blanca (Blanca)	3:11
14.	"You Will Never Run"	Rend Collective (As Family We Go)	2:58
15.	"King of My Heart"	Love & the Outcome (Love & the Outcome)	3:22
16.	"I'll Keep On" (featuring Jeremiah Carlson) (bonus track)	NF (Mansion)	4:13

Disc two deluxe edition
No.	Title	Artist (Album)	Length
17.	"Let It Be Love"	Family Force 5 (Time Stands Still)	3:30
18.	"This Is Living" (featuring Lecrae)	Hillsong Young and Free (This Is Living EP)	3:29
19.	"Making Me New"	Royal Tailor (Royal Tailor)	3:32

== Chart performance ==
Chart (2015)	Peak position
US Billboard 200	55
US Christian Albums (Billboard)	1
