= God of This City (Passion album) =

God of This City - Passion

Live album by Passion
- Released: February 5, 2008
- Recorded: Passion '07 (Atlanta) Passion Regionals: Boston and Chicago
- Genres: Worship, CCM
- Length: 73:03
- Label: sixsteps
- Producer: Nathan Nockels

Passion chronology
| Everything Glorious (2006) | God of This City - Passion (2008) | Passion: Awakening (2010) |

Professional ratings
Review scores
| Source | Rating |
|---|---|
| Jesusfreakhideout | 4/5 stars |
| Christianity Today | 4/5 stars |

God of This City is a live recording released by the Passion. It features many prominent Christian Contemporary Praise and Worship artists, such as Chris Tomlin, Charlie Hall, David Crowder Band, and Matt Redman. It was released worldwide on February 5, 2008, and peaked at No. 72 on the Billboard 200 Albums chart on February 23, 2008.

The recording is named after the track "God of This City", written by Bluetree and covered by Chris Tomlin. In 2009, American Idol winner Kris Allen has been known to perform "God of This City" in his concerts.

== Track listing ==
Album release
| No. | Title | Writer(s) | Artist(s) | Length |
|---|---|---|---|---|
| 1. | "Let God Arise" | Jesse Reeves, Chris Tomlin, Ed Cash | Chris Tomlin | 4:39 |
| 2. | "You Are God" | Kendall Combs, Dustin Ragland | Charlie Hall | 3:53 |
| 3. | "God of This City" | Richard Bleakley, Aaron Boyd, Peter Comfort, Ian Jordan, Peter Kernoghan, Andrew McCann | Chris Tomlin | 5:06 |
| 4. | "O for a Thousand Tongues to Sing" | David Crowder, Jack Parker, Traditional, Charles Wesley | David Crowder Band | 5:39 |
| 5. | "Hosanna" | Brooke Fraser | Christy Nockels | 5:46 |
| 6. | "Sing, Sing, Sing" | Daniel Carson, Reeves, Tomlin | Chris Tomlin | 5:51 |
| 7. | "Beautiful Jesus" | Kristian Stanfill, Cash | Kristian Stanfill | 5:00 |
| 8. | "Walk This World" | Kendall Combs | Charlie Hall | 4:15 |
| 9. | "We Shine" | Steve Fee, Louie Giglio | Fee | 5:17 |
| 10. | "God of Our Yesterdays" | Matt Redman | Matt Redman | 5:10 |
| 11. | "Glory of It All" | Crowder | David Crowder Band | 5:27 |
| 12. | "Shine" | Redman | Matt Redman | 4:48 |
| 13. | "Dancing Generation" | Redman | Matt Redman | 4:37 |
| 14. | "Amazing Grace (My Chains Are Gone)" | Giglio, Tomlin, Traditional | Chris Tomlin | 8:35 |
| Total length: | | | | 74:03 |

== Musicians ==
=== Chris Tomlin ===
- Chris Tomlin - acoustic guitar, lead vocals
- Jesse Reeves - bass
- Daniel Carson - electric guitar
- Matt Gilder - keyboard
- Travis Nunn - drums

=== Charlie Hall ===
- Charlie Hall - acoustic and electric guitar, lead vocals
- Kendall Combes - electric guitar
- Brian Bergman - keyboards
- Dustin Ragland - drums
- Quint Anderson - bass

=== David Crowder Band ===
- David Crowder - acoustic guitar, lead vocals
- Jack Parker - electric guitar
- Mike Hogan - violin and beats
- Mike Dodson - bass
- Jeremy Bush - drums
- Mark Waldrop - electric guitar

=== Christy Nockels ===
- Christy Nockels - lead vocals
- with Chris Tomlin's band

=== Kristian Stanfill ===
- Kristian Stanfill - acoustic guitar, lead vocals
- with Chris Tomlin's band

=== Fee ===
- Steve Fee - electric guitar, vocals
- Matt Adkins - electric guitar
- Heath Baltzglier - bass
- Brandon Coker - drums

=== Matt Redman ===
- Matt Redman - acoustic guitar, lead vocals
- Andrew Philips - keyboard
- with Chris Tomlin's band

=== Additional vocals ===
- Alvin Love (on "Let God Arise" and "Amazing Grace (My Chains are Gone)")
- Ashley Love (on "Let God Arise" and "Amazing Grace (My Chains are Gone)")
- Jimmy McNeal (on "God of This City" and "Sing, Sing, Sing")
- Jonas Myrin (on "God of our Yesterdays" and "Dancing Generation")
- Christy Nockels (on "Let God Arise", "God of This City", "Sing, Sing, Sing", "Dancing Generation" and "Amazing Grace (My Chains are Gone)")
- Nathan Nockels
- Nirva Dorsaint-Ready (on "Let God Arise" and "Amazing Grace (My Chains are Gone)")
- Seth Ready (on "God of This City" and "Sing, Sing, Sing")
- Kristian Stanfill (on "Let God Arise" and "Amazing Grace (My Chains are Gone)")

== Recording ==
The live recording of this album occurred during a span of approximately one year during Passion 2007 at Atlanta, and the Passion Regionals at Boston and Chicago.

=== Recorded at Passion 2007 ===
- "Let God Arise"
- "You are God"
- "O for a Thousand Tongues to Sing"
- "Walk the World"
- "The Glory of it All"
- "Shine"
- "Amazing Grace (My Chains are Gone)"

=== Recorded at Boston ===
- "We Shine"

=== Recorded at Chicago ===
- "God of This City"
- "Hosanna"
- "Sing, Sing, Sing"
- "Beautiful Jesus"
- "God of our Yesterdays"
- "Dancing Generation"

== Awards ==
In 2009, the album won a Dove Award for Special Event Album of the Year at the 40th GMA Dove Awards.
