= Mountains Move =

Studio album by Kristian Stanfill
- Released: January 11, 2011
- Studio: Conservatory Park (Nashville, Tennessee)
- Genre: Contemporary Christian music, worship
- Length: 45:19
- Label: sixsteps
- Producer: Jason Ingram; Rusty Varenkamp

Kristian Stanfill chronology
Attention (2009)	Mountains Move (2011)

Mountains Move is the second studio album from contemporary Christian music artist Kristian Stanfill, released on January 11, 2011 by sixstepsrecords.

== Background ==
Stanfill said the two "anchor songs" on the album are "You Will Reign" and "Always".

== Critical reception ==
Professional ratings
Review scores
Source	Rating
Allmusic	3.5/5 stars
CCM Magazine	3/5 stars
Christian Music Zine	4/5 stars
Jesus Freak Hideout	2/5 stars
Jesus Freak Hideout	3/5 stars
Louder Than the Music	5/5 stars
New Release Tuesday	4.5/5 stars
ONCOURSE MAGAZINE	4/5 stars

Allmusic's Jared Johnson said the album "is about projecting the positive, energetic face of the faithful life with an air of celebration. Stanfill claims to be strongly influenced by the 'spiritual side' of U2".

CCM Magazine's Andrew Greer said "marry Chris Tomlin's corporate worship with Phil Wickham's shimmering pop/rock and you get a snapshot of Kristian Stanfill's second cd." Greer wrote "worship music fans should definitely invest in Stanfill's worthy sophomoric contributions, but whether these tunes possess enough original zing to stand out from the popular Passion pack is still to be determined."

Christian Music Zine's Tyler Hess said "the bar has surely been raised for the other 011 worship releases."

Jesus Freak Hideout's Roger Gelwicks said this album "shows no improvement and is, in some ways, a step backward. Ordinary at best and recyclable at worst, it's variety, or lack thereof, that makes the project falter the most, both from a musical and lyrical standpoint. Worshipful as it may be, there's just not reason enough to bypass other more accomplished worship efforts for Stanfill's Mountains Move."

Jesus Freak Hideout's Jason Rooks said the album "incorporates his love of God and great songwriting abilities but musically lacks the raw emotion of other recent worship artists such as John Mark McMillan or Josh White."

Louder Than the Music's Jono Davies said "before you think I'm going over the top about how great this album is, and being overly positive, let me try and put some perspective on this. Let me think... at 11 tracks in length the album isn't long enough. Personally for me I think this is Kristian Stanfill at his best, from the hands in the air songs like Say, Say and Over All The Earth to powerful ending track We Will Glorify, this album has to be a 5 star rating."

New Release Tuesday's Kevin Davis said "'Lord Almighty' and 'Day After Day' are both great worship songs that I can imagine singing with fellow believers. We've sung Kristian's version of 'Jesus Paid It All' at my church and many of these songs have that same sincere worship style. This is a great collection of joyful, encouraging worship songs." Davis wrote "I found myself relating to the songs right away and I enjoy singing along in worship. If you like Fee, Charlie Hall, Chris Tomlin and Tim Hughes, you'll enjoy Kristian Stanfill." Davis said "this is the first [can't miss] worship album of 2011."

ONCOURSE MAGAZINE's Shannon Zabroski said "my hunch is Kristian will be expanding his influence in the worship music scene for years to come. While not breaking any new ground musically or lyrically, his combination of talent and passion are the right ingredients to continue growing as a musician, vocalist and worship leader."

== Track listing ==
No.	Title	Writer(s)	Length
1.	"Lord Almighty"	Ben Fielding, Jason Ingram, Kristian Stanfill	3:54
2.	"Day After Day"	Ingram, Stanfill, Tim Gibson	3:48
3.	"Say, Say"	Chris Tomlin, Christy Nockels, Stanfill	3:17
4.	"You Will Reign"	Ingram, Stanfill	4:33
5.	"My Reward"	Ingram, Reuben Morgan, Stanfill	4:30
6.	"Like a Lion"	Daniel Bashta	5:07
7.	"Always"	Ingram, Stanfill	4:25
8.	"Holding My World"	Tomlin, Nockels, Stanfill	3:40
9.	"Be with You Forever"	Ingram, Stanfill	3:42
10.	"Over All the Earth"	Ingram, Morgan, Stanfill	3:27
11.	"We Glorify Your Name"	Ingram, Stanfill	4:56

== Personnel ==
- Kristian Stanfill – vocals, guitars
- Davis Harwell – keyboards, programming
- Jason Ingram – programming, backing vocals
- Rusty Varenkamp – programming
- Matt Melton – guitars
- Tim Gibson – bass
- Jon Thibodeau – drums, programming
- Kate York – backing vocals

Gang vocals

- Tim Gibson, Davis Harwell, Mary Harwell, Matt Melton, Brett Stanfill, Kristian Stanfill, Tom Stanfill, Blake Thibodeau and Jon Thibodeau

== Production ==
- Louie Giglio – executive producer
- Shelley Giglio – executive producer, art direction, management
- Brad O'Donnell – executive producer
- Jason Ingram – producer
- Rusty Varenkamp – producer, recording, editing
- Thomas Toner – editing
- F. Reid Shippen – mixing
- Erik "Keller" Jahner – mix assistant
- Andrew Mendelson – mastering at Georgetown Masters (Nashville, Tennessee)
- Jess Chambers – A&R administration
- Crystal Varenkamp – production assistant
- Jan Cook – art direction
- Leighton Ching – design
- David Molnar – photography
- Mary Caroline Mann – live photography
- Mike McCloskey – management

== Charts ==
Album

Chart (2011)	Peak position
US Billboard 200	64
Billboard Christian Albums	3

Singles

Year	Single	Peak chart positions
Year	Single	Christian Songs
2010	"Day After Day"	20
2011	"Always"	28
