= White Flag (Passion song) =

Single by Passion

from the album Passion: White Flag
- Released: March 9, 2012
- Genre: Worship, CCM
- Length: 5:03
- Label: Sixsteps
- Songwriters: Jason Ingram; Matt Maher; Matt Redman; Chris Tomlin
- Producer: Nathan Nockels

Passion singles chronology
| "One Thing Remains" (2012) | "White Flag" (2012) | ""The Lord Our God"" (2013) |

"White Flag" is a worship song released by Passion as the lead single from their 2012 live album, Passion: White Flag, on March 9, 2012. It features guest vocals from American contemporary Christian music singer Chris Tomlin. The song peaked at No. 8 on the Christian Songs Billboard chart and appeared on the 2012 year-end Christian Songs chart at No. 20. Tomlin later released an album version of this song on his 2013 album, Burning Lights.

== Track listing ==
- Digital download
1. "White Flag (feat. Chris Tomlin)" – 5:03
- Digital download (Chris Tomlin album version)
1. "White Flag" – 4:33

== Charts ==
=== Weekly charts ===
| Chart (2012) | Peak position |
|---|---|
| US Christian Adult Contemporary (Billboard) | 8 |
| US Hot Christian Songs (Billboard) | 8 |

=== Year-end charts ===
| Chart (2012) | Peak position |
|---|---|
| US Hot Christian Songs (Billboard) | 20 |
