= Passion: Here for You =

Live album by Passion
- Released: March 8, 2011
- Recorded: 2011
- Genre: Worship, CCM
- Label: Sixsteps

Passion chronology
Passion: Awakening (2010)	Passion: Here for You (2011)	Passion: White Flag (2012)

Passion: Here for You is an album recorded live at Passion Conferences 2011. It features Chris Tomlin, Matt Redman, Christy Nockels, David Crowder Band and Kristian Stanfill. The songs "Shadows" and "Our God" feature Lecrae.

== Track listing ==
Album release
No.	Title	Writer(s)	Artist(s)	Length
1.	"Here for You"	Matt Maher, Matt Redman, Jesse Reeves, Tim Wanstall	Chris Tomlin	4:40
2.	"Symphony"	Louie Giglio, Jason Ingram, Maher, Redman, Chris Tomlin	Chris Tomlin	5:33
3.	"Waiting Here for You"	Reeves, Martin Smith, Tomlin	Christy Nockels	6:06
4.	"All My Fountains"	Daniel Carson, Nathan Nockels, Tomlin	Chris Tomlin	5:11
5.	"Shadows"	David Crowder, Lecrae Moore	David Crowder*Band & Lecrae	5:11
6.	"Lord, I Need You"	Carson, Maher, Christy Nockels, Reeves, Kristian Stanfill	Chris Tomlin	4:34
7.	"Set Free"	Ben Fielding, Ingram, Redman, Tomlin	Chris Tomlin & Matt Redman	3:54
8.	"Forever Reign"	Ingram, Reuben Morgan	Kristian Stanfill	5:28
9.	"Sometimes"	Crowder	David Crowder*Band	6:08
10.	"Always"	Ingram, Stanfill	Kristian Stanfill	5:42
11.	"Carry Your Name"	Ingram, Christy Nockels, Nathan Nockels, Tomlin	Christy Nockels	5:04
12.	"Spirit Fall"	Carson, Giglio, Ingram, Stanfill	Chris Tomlin	7:27
Total length:				64:57

Deluxe CD
No.	Title	Artist(s)	Length
13.	"All to Us"	Chris Tomlin	7:27
14.	"Constant"	Charlie Hall	6:09
15.	"Our God"	Chris Tomlin & Lecrae	6:57

== Trivia ==
- The song "Waiting Here for You", is covered by Martin Smith, Jesus Culture, Soul Survivor and Generación 12, in Spanish "Esperándote".
