= One Thing Remains (song) =

Single by Passion

from the album Passion: White Flag
- Released: October 2010 (original) September 14, 2012
- Genre: Worship, CCM
- Length: 5:49
- Label: Sixsteps
- Songwriters: Christa Black Gifford; Brian Johnson; Jeremy Riddle
- Producer: Nathan Nockels

Passion singles chronology
"White Flag" (2012)	"One Thing Remains" (2010)	"The Lord Our God" (2013)

"One Thing Remains" is a worship song written by Brian Johnson, Jeremy Riddle and Christa Black Gifford. Initially released by Bethel Music on their second album Be Lifted High (2011), the song rose to prominence when it was performed by Christian organization Passion. It was released as Passion's second single from their 2012 album, Passion: White Flag, on September 14, 2012. It features guest vocals from American contemporary Christian music singer Kristian Stanfill. The song became both Passion and Stanfill's first Hot Christian Songs No. 1. The track held the No. 1 position for four weeks. Even with Brian Johnson singing it on Be Lifted High, the song was first released on Bethel's Youth (at the time) led group Jesus Culture on their album Come Away with Chris Quilala leading the song.

== Track listing ==
- Digital download
1. "One Thing Remains" – 5:48
- Digital download (radio version)
1. "One Thing Remains" – 3:59

== Charts ==
=== Weekly charts ===
Chart (2012–13)	Peak position
US Christian AC Songs (Billboard)	1
US Hot Christian Songs (Billboard)	1

=== Year-end charts ===
Chart (2012)	Peak position
US Christian Songs (Billboard)	37
Chart (2013)	Peak position
US Christian Songs (Billboard)	3
US Christian AC (Billboard)	4

=== Decade-end charts ===
Chart (2010s)	Position
US Christian Songs (Billboard)	20

== Certifications ==
Region	Certification	Certified units/sales
United States (RIAA)	Gold	500,000^{‡}
^{‡} Sales+streaming figures based on certification alone.
