= Even So Come (song) =

Single by Passion

from the album Passion: Even So Come
- Released: April 28, 2015
- Genre: Worship, CCM, Christian AC
- Length: 7:19 (Live Version w/ Chris Tomlin); 4:14 (Radio Version w/ Kristian Stanfill)
- Label: Sixsteps
- Songwriter(s): Jess Cates; Jason Ingram; Chris Tomlin
- Producer(s): Nathan Nockels

Passion singles chronology
"My Heart Is Yours" (2014)	"Even So Come" (2015)	"Remember" (2016)

"Even So Come" is a worship song released by Passion as the lead single from their 2015 live album, Passion: Even So Come, on April 28, 2015. It features guest vocals from American Christian music singers Chris Tomlin on the album version and Kristian Stanfill on the radio single version. The song peaked at No. 7 on the Christian Songs Billboard chart and appeared on No. 14 on the year end Christian Songs chart. The song was also featured on the Worship Leader's Top 20 Songs of 2015 list, reaching No. 5 on the list. The radio version appeared on WOW Hits 2016.

== Track listing ==
- Digital download
1. "Even So Come (Live) [feat. Chris Tomlin]" – 7:19
- Digital download (radio version)
1. "Even So Come (Radio Version/Live)" – 4:14

== Charts ==
=== Weekly charts ===
Chart (2015)	Peak position
US Christian AC Songs (Billboard)	3
US Christian AC Indicator (Billboard)	7
US Christian Airplay (Billboard)	3
US Christian Songs (Billboard)	7

=== Year-end charts ===
Chart (2015)	Peak position
US Christian Airplay (Billboard)	9
US Christian Songs (Billboard)	14

== Certifications ==
Region	Certification	Certified units/sales
United States (RIAA)	Gold	500,000^{‡}
^{‡} Sales+streaming figures based on certification alone.
