= MercyMe, It's Christmas! =

MercyMe, It's Christmas

Studio album by MercyMe
- Released: October 9, 2015
- Studio: The Beehive (Nashville, Tennessee); Townsend Sound Studios (Franklin, Tennessee).
- Genre: Contemporary Christian music, pop rock, Christmas
- Length: 41:18
- Label: Fair Trade
- Producer: Brown Bannister; Ben Shive

MercyMe chronology
Welcome to the New (2014)	MercyMe, It's Christmas (2015)	Lifer (2017)

MercyMe, It's Christmas is the second Christmas album by MercyMe, released on October 9, 2015, through Fair Trade Services. The album was produced by Brown Bannister and Ben Shive.

== Critical reception ==
Professional ratings
Review scores
Source	Rating
365 Days of Inspiring Media	4/5 stars
CCM Magazine	4/5 stars
Cross Rhythms	9/10 squares
The Front Row Report	9/10 stars
Jesus Freak Hideout	4/5 stars
New Release Today	4.5/5 stars

Awarding the album four stars at CCM Magazine, Andy Argyrakis states, "there’s basically something for everyone on one of this season’s most inviting." Christopher Smith, rating the album four stars from Jesus Freak Hideout, writes, "MercyMe, It's Christmas! is a huge success and sets a high bar for the rest of the Christmas releases this year. Though you might not be ready for it, it is a spectacular addition to any Christmas music collection." Giving the album four and a half stars for New Release Today, Caitlin Lassiter says, "It's Christmas is certainly a success as far as Christmas records go and is sure to be the soundtrack to many holiday festivities in homes around the country this season."

Allocating the album a nine out of ten for Cross Rhythms, Brendan O'Regan writes, "Mind you they might also be moved to dance by the pacey numbers." Joshua Andre, indicating in a four star review by 365 Days of Inspiring Media, says, "MercyMe have crafted a fine effort". Assigning the album nine stars out of ten at The Front Row Report, Reggie Edwards responds, "MercyMe have outdone themselves". Sarah Baylor, signaling in a 4.8 out of five review from The Christian Beat, replies, "MercyMe has managed to create a brilliant Christmas album that contains their own unique, spirit-filled sound."

== Track listing ==
No.	Title	Writer(s)	Length
1.	"Newborn"	Traditional; Brown Bannister, Ben Shive, MercyMe	5:30
2.	"Christmastime Again"	Bannister, Shive, MercyMe	3:12
3.	"Sleigh Ride"	Leroy Anderson, Mitchell Parish	3:20
4.	"I'll Be Home for Christmas"	Kim Gannon, Walter Kent, Buck Ram	3:50
5.	"Hold on Christmas"	Bannister, Shive, MercyMe	3:45
6.	"A Holly Jolly Christmas"	Johnny Marks	3:23
7.	"Go Tell It on the Mountain"	Traditional	2:14
8.	"Do You Hear What I Hear?"	Noël Regney, Gloria Shayne	4:13
9.	"Our Lullaby"	Bannister, Shive, MercyMe	3:05
10.	"Joy"	Traditional; Bannister, Shive, MercyMe	5:08
11.	"O Come, O Come"	Traditional	3:38
Total length:			41:18

== Personnel ==
MercyMe

- Bart Millard – lead vocals, backing vocals, arrangements
- Barry Graul – guitars, backing vocals, arrangements
- Mike Scheuchzer – guitars, backing vocals, arrangements
- Nathan Cochran – bass, backing vocals, arrangements
- Robby Shaffer – drums, arrangements

Additional Musicians

- Ben Shive – acoustic piano, keyboards, Hammond B3 organ, programming, arrangements, horn arrangements, string arrangements
- Mark Douthit – saxophones
- Barry Green – trombone
- Mike Haynes – trumpet
- Keith Smith – trumpet, arrangements
- Carol Neuen-Rabinowitz – cello
- Monisa Angell – viola
- Kristin Wilkinson – viola
- David Angell – violin
- Janet Darnall – violin
- David Davidson – violin
- Brown Bannister – arrangements

== Production ==
- Brown Bannister – producer, overdub recording
- Ben Shive – producer, overdub recording
- Buckley Miller – engineer
- Joe Pisapia – engineer
- Crystal Burks – assistant engineer
- Aaron Chafin – assistant engineer
- Jordan Logue – assistant engineer
- Shane D. Wilson – mixing
- Lani Crump – mix coordinator
- Kyle Cummings – digital editing
- Ted Jensen – mastering at Sterling Sound (New York City, New York).
- Brody Harper – art direction, design
- Dana Salsedo – art direction
- Eric Brown – photography

== Chart performance ==
Chart (2015)	Peak position
US Billboard 200	38
US Christian Albums (Billboard)	1
US Top Holiday Albums (Billboard)	1
