= Passion: Salvation's Tide Is Rising =

Studio album by Passion
- Released: January 1, 2016
- Recorded: 2015
- Genre: Worship, CCM
- Length: 50:50
- Label: sixsteps

Passion chronology
Passion: Even So Come (2015)	Passion: Salvation's Tide Is Rising (2016)	Worthy of Your Name (2017)

Passion: Salvation's Tide Is Rising is a studio album by Passion. SixSteps Records released the album on January 1, 2016.

== Critical reception ==
Professional ratings
Review scores
Source	Rating
365 Days of Inspiring Media	4/5 stars
CCM Magazine	4/5 stars
The Christian Beat	4.5/5 stars
The Christian Manifesto	4/5 stars
CM Addict	4/5 stars
Cross Rhythms	9/10 squares
Jesus Freak Hideout	3.5/5 stars
New Release Today	4.5/5 stars
Today's Christian Entertainment	4/5 stars
Worship Leader	4/5 stars

Graham Gladstone, indicating in a four star review at Worship Leader, describes, "unique flair." Rating the album a nine out of ten for Cross Rhythms, Brendan O'Regan says, "These are straight-up worship songs and will act as a support to people of faith." Matt Conner, affixing a four star rating upon the release at CCM Magazine, describes, "This is easily the best Passion worship release in several years." Allocating a three and a half star rating upon the release from Jesus Freak Hideout, Michael Weaver states, "Giving Salvation's Tide is Rising the studio treatment was an excellent decision." Mikayla Shriver, assigning the album four and a half stars from New Release Today, says, "Passion Conference is highly esteemed in the Christian world, and with albums like new Salvation's Tide Is Rising, it shouldn't be any other way." Awarding the album four stars at The Christian Manifesto, Cal Moore states, "it's pretty good." Michael Tackett, giving the album four stars from CM Addict, writes, "Lyrically it may stick to similar worship songs but the musical approach makes it stand out as one of the better worship records out there today." Reviewing the album for Hallels, Timothy Yap says, "after a few listens, less is definitely more here...Though there are fewer songs on Salvation's Tide is Rising than their previous albums, the songs here are tighter, more focused, and more inviting as far as congregational worship is concerned." Joshua Andre, signaling in a four star review by 365 Days of Inspiring Media, describes, "Salvation's Tide Is Rising hardly has any faults, and is just as good as its predecessors." Indicating in a four and a half star review at The Christian Beat, Madeleine Dittmer states, "Providing an incredible source of inspiration and hope to all who listen, this record offers fresh new songs that help to deepen our relationship with the Good, Good Father." Laura Chambers, allotting the album four stars from Today's Christian Entertainment, responds, "Salvation’s Tide Is Rising, in a refreshingly simple way, takes us back to the roots of our hope in Christ; love, grace, surrender."

== Track listing ==
No.	Title	Writer(s)	Artist(s)	Length
1.	"Salvation's Tide"	Jason Ingram, Matt Maher, Kristian Stanfill, Brett Younker	Kristian Stanfill	5:07
2.	"My Victory"	Hank Bentley, Ed Cash, David Crowder, Darren Mulligan	Crowder	4:28
3.	"Remember"	Johan Åsgärde, Crowder, Mattias Frändå, Oliver Lundström, Solomon Olds, Brett Younker	Brett Younker	4:10
4.	"God and God Alone"	Ingram, Jonas Myrin, Chris Tomlin	Chris Tomlin	4:58
5.	"Simple Pursuit"	Sam Bailey, Ben Cantelon, Nick Herbert, Matt Redman	Melodie Malone	5:57
6.	"I Turn to Christ"	Myrin, Redman	Matt Redman	5:13
7.	"Your Grace Amazes Me"	Daniel Carson, Ingram, Christy Nockels	Christy Nockels	5:37
8.	"All We Sinners"	Cash, Crowder	Crowder	4:37
9.	"Surrender"	Jimi Cravity	Jimi Cravity	4:47
10.	"Good Good Father"	Pat Barrett, Tony Brown	Stanfill	5:56
Total length:				50:50

== Chart performance ==
Chart (2016)	Peak position
US Billboard 200	19
US Christian Albums (Billboard)	1
