= Charlie Hall (musician) =

American contemporary worship music leader

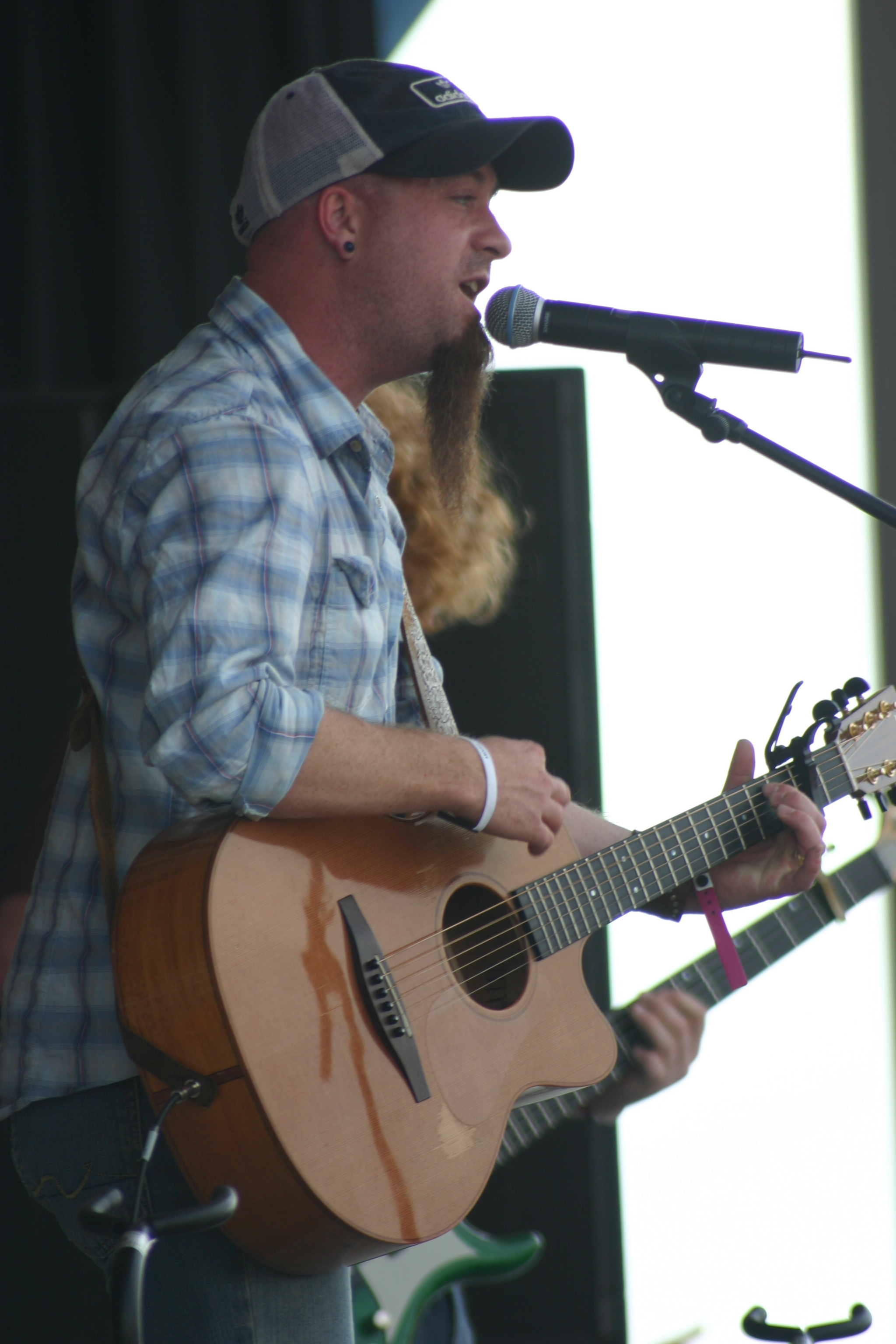

Background information
- Birth name: Charles Eugene Hall III
- Born: May 30, 1973 (age 51); Fort Campbell, Kentucky U.S.
- Genres: Contemporary worship music
- Occupation(s): Singer, songwriter, worship leader
- Years active: 1991–present
- Labels: sixstepsrecords
- Website: charliehall.com

Charles Eugene Hall III (born May 30, 1973) is a contemporary worship music leader and songwriter from Oklahoma City, Oklahoma. He is a member of a group of musicians and speakers that collectively form the Passion movement.

== Career ==
Hall is a pastor of worship arts and liturgy at Frontline Church in Oklahoma City, Oklahoma.

Hall's band, in which he performs vocals and guitar, consists of Ben Freeman (electric guitar and keyboards), Dustin Ragland (drums), and Quint Anderson (bass synth).

== Discography ==
- Don't Pass Us By (as "Nathan & Charlie") (1994)
- Holy Roar (as "Sons & Daughters") (1996)
- Joel's Window (1997)
- Thought (1998)
- Porch and Altar (2001)
- On the Road to Beautiful (2003)
- Live Roots (2004)
- September Through November (2005)
- Flying into Daybreak (2006)
- The Bright Sadness (2008)
- The Rising (2010)
- The Death of Death (2013)

=== Passion event albums ===
- Our Soul's Desire (1997)
- Live Worship from the 268 Generation (1998)
- Better Is One Day (1999)
- One Day: Live (2000)
- The Road To One Day (2000)
- Our Love Is Loud (2002)
- Sacred Revolution (2003)
- Hymns Ancient and Modern (2004)
- How Great Is Our God (2005)
- Everything Glorious (2006)
- God of This City (2008)
- Awakening (2010)
- Here for You (2011)
- White Flag (2012)
- Let the Future Begin (2013)

== Awards ==
GMA Dove Awards

- 2007: Everything Glorious – Special Event Album of the Year
