= Sparrow Records =

American record label

- Parent company: Universal Music Group (2012–present); EMI (1996–2012); Thorn EMI (1992–1996)
- Founded: February 1976; 50 years ago
- Founder: Billy Ray Hearn
- Distributor: Capitol CMG
- Genre: CCM, gospel
- Country of origin: United States
- Location: Brentwood, Tennessee, U.S.
- Official website: sparrowrecords.com

Sparrow Records is a Christian music record label and a division of Universal Music Group.

== History ==
Sparrow Records was founded in 1976 by Billy Ray Hearn, then artists and repertoire (A&R) director at Myrrh Records. Barry McGuire was the first artist signed to the label, followed quickly by John Michael Talbot and his brother Terry, Janny Grein, and Annie Herring of 2nd Chapter of Acts; all of whom released albums with Sparrow in May of that year.

Purchased by Thorn EMI in 1992, Sparrow's parent underwent a demerger four years later to become the EMI Group, and the label is now part of the Capitol Christian Music Group.

As of 2009, Sparrow's artists include Britt Nicole, Chris Tomlin, Mandisa, Matt Redman, Matthew West, Steven Curtis Chapman and Switchfoot. Since 1996, a popular production of Sparrow Records has been the annual WOW Hits contemporary Christian music series. In 1998, the WOW franchise then added the annual WOW Gospel series of albums. The WOW Worship series was introduced in 1999.

== Notable artists ==
Source: Artist List

- Amy Grant
- Anne Wilson
- Bethel Music
- Blessing Offor
- Brian Courtney Wilson
- Brandon Lake
- Brooke Ligertwood
- Brian Johnson & Jenn Johnson
- Bryan & Katie Torwalt
- Canaan Baca
- Chris McClarney
- Chris Quilala
- Chris Tomlin
- Christine D'Clario
- Cody Carnes
- Crowder
- Dante Bowe
- Danny Gokey
- Ellie Holcomb
- Evvie McKinney
- Hillsong United
- Hillsong Worship
- Hillsong Young & Free
- HLE
- Housefires
- Jeremy Camp
- Jeremy Rosado
- Jesus Culture
- Jon Foreman
- Karen Clark Sheard
- Kari Jobe
- Kevin Curiel
- Kevin Quinn
- Kim Walker-Smith
- Mac Powell
- Mosaic MSC
- Newsboys
- Passion
- Pat Barrett
- Rend Collective (with Rend Family Records)
- Ricky Dillard
- Riley Clemmons
- Social Club Misfits
- Stephen Stanley
- Tasha Cobbs Leonard
- Tauren Wells
- The Baylor Project
- TobyMac (also with ForeFront Records)
- Twinkie Clark
- Tye Tribbett
- We the Kingdom

== Former ==
- 2nd Chapter of Acts (disbanded)
- Above the Golden State
- Susan Ashton (active, unsigned)
- Audrey Assad (active, independent)
- Avalon (active, with Red Street Records)
- Margaret Becker (active, with Kingsway Music)
- Bellarive
- Dan Bremnes
- Steve Camp (active, unsigned)
- Michael Card (active, unsigned)
- Marcos Vidal (active, unsigned)
- Carman (deceased)
- Steven Curtis Chapman (active, with Reunion Records)
- City Harbor
- Daryl Coley (deceased)
- David Crowder*Band (disbanded, had moved to sixstepsrecords)
- Danyew
- DC Talk (hiatus)
- Delirious? (disbanded)
- Bethany Dillon (active)
- Dogs of Peace (active)
- Earthsuit (disbanded)
- The Elms (disbanded)
- Kirk Franklin (active, with GospoCentric Records)
- Peter Furler (active, independent)
- Keith Green (deceased)
- Steve Green (active, unsigned)
- Rickey Grundy, (active, independent)
- Charlie Hall (active, with sixstepsrecords)
- Matt Hammitt
- Tramaine Hawkins
- Tim Hughes (active, with Survivor Records)
- Kari Jobe (active, with Capitol Christian Music Group)
- Jump5 (disbanded)
- Phil Keaggy (active)
- Donald Lawrence
- Luminate
- Mandisa (deceased)
- Barry McGuire (active, unsigned)
- Geoff Moore and the Distance (disbanded)
- Michael W. Smith (active, with Rocketown Records)
- Needtobreathe (active, with Atlantic Records)
- Newsboys
- Christy Nockels (active, with sixstepsrecords)
- Out of the Grey (on hiatus)
- Twila Paris (active, with Koch Records)
- Charlie Peacock (active, independent)
- Marty Raybon
- Matt Redman (active, with Integrity Music)
- Resurrection Band
- Sanctus Real
- Sarah Reeves
- Samestate
- Robbie Seay Band (active, unsigned)
- Something Like Silas
- Soulfire Revolution
- Kristian Stanfill (active, with sixstepsrecords)
- Starfield (active, independent)
- Switchfoot (active, with lowercase people records) (Switchfoot still has a distribution agreement with Sparrow Records)
- Russ Taff (active, with Springhouse Records)
- John Michael Talbot (active, with Troubadour for the Lord)
- Steve Taylor
- Chris Tomlin (active, with sixstepsrecords)
- Michelle Tumes (active, with EMI CMG)
- The Waiting (active, independent)
- Sheila Walsh (active)
- Matthew Ward (active, independent)
- Matthew West
- Lisa Whelchel
- White Heart
- Josh Wilson (active on Black River Christian)
- Deniece Williams (last worked, with Shanachie Records)
- ZOEgirl (active, with ZOEgirl Music/The Fuel Music)
- Danniebelle Hall (deceased)
- West Angeles Church of God in Christ Mass Choir and Congregation ("Saints in Praise" series)
- The Archers (musical group)
- Jimi Cravity
- Kristene DiMarco
- Colton Dixon (with 19 Recordings)
- Shawn McDonald
- NF (with Capitol Records)
- Britt Nicole (currently independent)
- Christy Nockels
- Nichole Nordeman
- Kristian Stanfill
- The Young Escape

== Compilations ==
- Firewind: A Contemporary Dramatic Musical (1976)
- Christmas (1988)
- Passion: Awakening (2010)

== Sparrow projects ==
- WOW Worship Series

== See also ==
- List of record labels
- Contemporary Christian Music
