= Passion: Awakening =

Live album by Passion
- Released: March 11, 2010
- Recorded: January 2–5, 2010
- Venues: Georgia World Congress Center, Atlanta, GA
- Genres: Worship, CCM
- Length: 65:13
- Label: sixsteps
- Producer: Nathan Nockels

Passion chronology
God of This City (2008)	Passion: Awakening (2010)	Passion: Here for You (2011)

Professional ratings
Review scores
Source	Rating
Jesus Freak Hideout	3.5/5 stars
Christianity Today	3/5 stars
Cross Rhythms	9/10 squares

Passion: Awakening is an album recorded live at Passion Conferences 10, the 2010 gathering of the Passion. The album was released on March 11, 2010. It took the No. 1 position on Billboard Christian Albums chart upon its debut.

== Track listing ==
Passion: Awakening – Standard edition
No.	Title	Writer(s)	Artist(s)	Length
1.	"Awakening"	Chris Tomlin, Reuben Morgan	Tomlin	4:52
2.	"Say, Say"	Tomlin, Christy Nockels, Kristian Stanfill	Stanfill	3:27
3.	"Our God"	Tomlin, Jesse Reeves, Jonas Myrin, Matt Redman	Tomlin	5:28
4.	"How He Loves"	John Mark McMillan	David Crowder	5:33
5.	"Healing Is in Your Hands"	Tomlin, Nockels, Redman, Daniel Carson, Nathan Nockels	Nockels	4:23
6.	"King of Heaven (Isaiah 61)"	Brian Bergman, Charlie Hall, Dustin Ragland, Kendall Combes, Quint Anderson	Hall	5:32
7.	"You Alone Can Rescue"	Myrin, Redman	Redman	5:13
8.	"Where the Spirit of the Lord Is"	Tomlin, Nockels, N. Nockels	Tomlin & Nockels	5:00
9.	"Rise and Sing"	Steve Fee	Fee	5:11
10.	"Like a Lion"	Daniel Bashta	Crowder*Band	6:12
11.	"Chosen Generation"	Tomlin, Reeves, Carson, Louie Giglio	Tomlin	5:47
12.	"With Everything"	Joel Houston	Hillsong United	8:39
Total length:				1:05:13

Passion: Awakening – Special edition
No.	Title	Writer(s)	Artist(s)	Length
13.	"A Mighty Fortress"	Nockels, N. Nockels	Nockels	6:11
14.	"Jesus Messiah"	Tomlin, Reeves, Carson, Ed Cash	Tomlin	5:15
15.	"The Stand"	Houston	Stanfill	6:08
Total length:				1:22:50

== Singles ==
- "Our God" (2010) - No. 1 on Billboard Christian charts for 10 weeks
- "Healing Is In Your Hands" (2010)

== Charts ==
Chart (2010)	Peak position
US Billboard 200	15
US Top Christian Albums (Billboard)	1

== Awards ==
The album was nominated for two Dove Awards: Praise & Worship Album of the Year and Special Event Album of the Year, at the 42nd GMA Dove Awards.
