= Passion: Let the Future Begin =

Live album by Passion
- Released: March 12, 2013
- Recorded: January 1–4, 2013
- Venue: Georgia Dome
- Genres: Worship, CCM
- Length: 79:44
- Label: sixsteps
- Producers: Nathan Nockels, Louie Giglio, Shelley Giglio, Brad O'Donnell

Passion chronology
Passion: White Flag (2012)	Passion: Let the Future Begin (2013)	Passion: Take It All (2014)

Singles from Passion: White Flag
- 1. "The Lord Our God" Released: March 9, 2013; 2. "In Christ Alone" Released: September 13, 2013

Passion: Let the Future Begin is a live album recorded at the 2013 Passion Conference with more than 60,000 university-aged students in Atlanta, Georgia. This collection of new songs features sixstepsrecords artists Chris Tomlin, David Crowder, Charlie Hall, Matt Redman, Christy Nockels, and Kristian Stanfill, and other special guests. The album was released by Passion on March 12, 2013. On March 30, 2013, the album charted on the Billboard 200 and the Christian Albums charts, which it was charted at Nos. 4 and 1 respectively.

== Track listing ==
Album release
No.	Title	Writer(s)	Worship leader(s)	Length
1.	"God's Great Dance Floor"	Nick Herbert, Martin Smith, Chris Tomlin	Chris Tomlin	7:11
2.	"The Lord Our God"	Jason Ingram, Kristian Stanfill	Kristian Stanfill	4:47
3.	"Jesus, Only Jesus"	Christy Nockels, Nathan Nockels, Matt Redman, Stanfill, Tomlin, Tony Wood	Matt Redman	4:54
4.	"Once and for All"	Ed Cash, Ingram, Matt Maher, Tomlin	Chris Tomlin	5:50
5.	"Burning in My Soul"	Daniel Carson, Maher, Jesse Reeves, Brett Younker	Brett Younker	5:22
6.	"Revelation Song"	Jennie Lee Riddle	Kari Jobe	8:28
7.	"Children of Light"	Pat Barrett, Ingram, Reeves, Stanfill	Kristian Stanfill	4:27
8.	"Whom Shall I Fear [God of Angel Armies]"	E. Cash, Scott Cash, Tomlin	Chris Tomlin	5:21
9.	"We Glorify Your Name"	E. Cash, Ingram, Maher, Reuben Morgan, Tomlin	Chris Tomlin	3:23
10.	"Here's My Heart"	Louie Giglio, Ingram, Tomlin	Crowder	6:57
11.	"Come to the Water"	Stanfill, Younker	Kristian Stanfill	6:22
12.	"My Delight Is in You"	Brian Doerksen, C. Nockels, Reeves, Tomlin	Christy Nockels	6:36
13.	"Shout"	Redman, Reeves, Tomlin	Chris Tomlin & Matt Redman	4:27
14.	"In Christ Alone"	Keith Getty, Stanfill, Stuart Townend	Kristian Stanfill	5:39

Deluxe edition (additional tracks)
No.	Title	Artist(s)	Length
15.	"Death of Death"	Charlie Hall	5:59

== Charts ==
Chart (2013)	Peak position
US Billboard 200	4
US Top Christian Albums (Billboard)	1
