= Passion: Even So Come =

Live album by Passion
- Released: March 17, 2015
- Recorded: 2015
- Genre: Contemporary worship music, contemporary Christian music, Christian rock
- Length: 64:51
- Label: sixsteps
- Producer: Nathan Nockels

Passion chronology
Passion: Take It All (2014)	Passion: Even So Come (2015)	Passion: Salvation's Tide Is Rising (2016)

Passion: Even So Come is a live album by Passion. Sixstepsrecords released the album on March 17, 2015. This album was produced by Nathan Nockels.

== Critical reception ==
Professional ratings
Review scores
Source	Rating
365 Days of Inspiring Media	4.5/5 stars
CCM Magazine	3.5/5 stars
Christian Music Review	4.5/5
Christian Review Magazine	3.5/5 stars
Cross Rhythms	8/10 squares
The Front Row Report	9/10 stars
Jesus Freak Hideout	3.5/5 stars
Louder Than the Music	5/5 stars
New Release Tuesday	4.5/5 stars
Worship Leader	4/5 stars

In a three and a half star review in CCM Magazine, Matt Conner comments that the "legacy continues". Kevin Davis from New Release Tuesday gave the album four and a half stars, calling the songs "catchy, exciting and worshipful." In a three and a half star review at Jesus Freak Hideout, Alex Caldwell writes, "The Passion conferences and their accompanying music, like any artistic enterprise, have their high and low points, but thankfully, Even So Come has many more of the former than the latter." Matt McChlery scored the album eight out of ten in a review for Cross Rhythms, stating "'Even So Come' captures the sound of a generation of student worshippers and continues the established Passion tradition of containing songs that draw people into the presence of God." Designating the album a 4.5 out of five for Christian Music Review, Jay Heilman declares, "Even So Come will go far in bringing together the masses in absolute worship, but most importantly, it paints a beautiful picture of how wonderful Jesus is and brings Him the honor and glory He truly deserves." Jono Davies, in appraising the album five stars by Louder Than the Music, describes, "This album has so many great songs and if I'm being honest, this really might be Passion's most complete album yet." Awarding the album nine out of ten stars in The Front Row Report, Reggie Edwards says, "Each song flows perfectly into the next and it’s a perfectly-constructed worship experience." Leah St. John, giving the album three and a half stars from Christian Review Magazine, writes, "Even So Come didn't really strike a chord". Rating the album four and a half stars at 365 Days of Inspiring Media, Joshua Andre says, "Louie Giglio and sixsteps Records have done a fantastic job!"

== Accolades ==
The album reached No. 7 on Worship Leader's Top 20 Albums of 2015 list.

The song "Even So Come" reached No. 5 on Worship Leader's Top 20 Songs of 2015 list.

== Track listing ==
Standard edition
No.	Title	Writer(s)	Artist(s)	Length
1.	"Even So Come"	Jess Cates, Jason Ingram, Chris Tomlin	Chris Tomlin	7:19
2.	"Shout Hosanna"	Ed Cash, Kristian Stanfill, Tomlin, Brett Younker	Kristian Stanfill	4:02
3.	"Forever"	Christa Black Gifford, Kari Jobe, Brian Johnson, Jenn Johnson, Joel Taylor, Gabriel Wilson	Melodie Malone	6:37
4.	"Lift Your Head Weary Sinner (Chains)"	Cash, David Crowder, Seth Philpott	Crowder	4:01
5.	"Draw Near"	Ingram, Stanfill	Stanfill	8:03
6.	"The Saving One"	Ben Fielding, Matt Maher, Marty Sampson, Tomlin	Tomlin	5:00
7.	"The Awesome God You Are"	Cash, Ingram, Matt Redman	Matt Redman	4:51
8.	"My Anchor"	Ingram, Christy Nockels	Christy Nockels	6:31
9.	"Wonder"	Nate Bedingfield, Hank Bentley, Crowder	Crowder	3:55
10.	"The Way"	Ben Cantelon, Nick Herbert, Tim Hughes	Brett Younker	4:52
11.	"You Found Me"	Ingram, Maher, Stanfill, Younker	Stanfill	4:10
12.	"The Cross of Christ"	Cash, Ingram, Reuben Morgan, Tomlin	Tomlin	5:30
Total length:				64:51

Deluxe edition
No.	Title	Artist(s)	Length
13.	"We Fall Down"	Tomlin	2:48
14.	"The Heart of Worship"	Redman	3:01
15.	"It Is Well"	Stanfill	5:08
16.	"How He Loves"	Crowder	4:43
17.	"The Heart of Worship" (Video)	Redman	3:00
18.	"How He Loves" (Video)	Crowder	4:41

== Charts ==
Chart (2015)	Peak position
US Billboard 200	18
US Christian Albums (Billboard)	1
