= Passion: Take It All =

Live album by Passion
- Released: April 29, 2014
- Recorded: Philips Arena; January 17–18, 2014; Toyota Center; February 14–15, 2014
- Genres: Worship, contemporary Christian music
- Length: 64:42
- Label: sixsteps
- Producers: Nathan Nockels, Louie Giglio, Shelley Giglio, Brad O'Donnell

Passion chronology
Passion: Let the Future Begin (2013)	Passion: Take It All (2014)	Passion: Even So Come (2015)

Passion: Take It All is a contemporary worship album recorded live at Passion Conferences in Atlanta and Houston in 2014. The album features bestselling artists Chris Tomlin, Crowder, Matt Redman, Christy Nockels, and Kristian Stanfill, along with special guest performances.

== Critical reception ==
Professional ratings
Review scores
Source	Rating
CCM Magazine	3/5 stars
Christian Music Review	5/5 stars
The Christian Music Review Blog	5/5 stars
Christian Music Zine	4.5/5 stars
HM	3.5/5 stars
Indie Vision Music	4/5 stars
Jesus Freak Hideout	3.5/5 stars
Louder Than the Music	5/5 stars
Worship Leader	4.5/5 stars

Passion: Take It All received positive reviews from music critics. Andrew Greer of CCM Magazine rated the album three stars, indicating how "Passion translates the presence of live worship to tape better than any other corporate recording available." At Worship Leader, Andrea Hunter rated the album four-and-a-half stars, stating that on the release it contains "No surprises, but some solidly biblical and heartfelt offerings that will serve as a resource for the Church." David Stagg of HM rated the album three-and-a-half stars, writing that the release is "great for singing in your car" and "great for a pick-me-up", but also lamenting that Passion albums' sound was becoming formulaic, asking "When does business stop and passion start?" At Indie Vision Music, Jonathan Andre rated the album four stars, saying that it "is a step up from last year's Passion offering". Mark Rice of Jesus Freak Hideout rated the album three-and-a-half stars, stating that the release "is a very solid project among live worship albums" on which they take "several steps in the right direction without any real regression." At Christian Music Zine, Joshua Andre rated the album four-and-a-half stars, writing how the release "is ridiculously good", and calling the album simply "spectacular". April Covington of Christian Music Review rated the album a perfect five stars, saying that "The musicians' ability to set the mood without taking away from the worship, and the powerful message within the lyrics makes this an awesome album." At Louder Than the Music, Tom Hind rated the album a perfect five stars, stating that "this is one of the finest worship albums you will hear for a long time." The Christian Music Review Blog's Jim Wilkerson rated the album a perfect five stars, saying that "this is a solid album that is really going to go places."

== Awards and accolades ==
This album was No. 10 on the Worship Leader's Top 20 Albums of 2014 list.

The song, "My Heart Is Yours", was No. 12 on the Worship Leader's Top 20 Songs of 2014 list.

== Commercial performance ==
For the Billboard charting week of May 17, 2014, Passion: Take It All was the No. 4 most sold album in the entirety of the United States via the Billboard 200, and it was the No. 1 most sold album in the Christian Albums market. In its first week of sales, the album sold 30,000 copies.

== Track listing ==
Album release
No.	Title	Writer(s)	Artist(s)	Length
1.	"Don't Ever Stop"	Chris Tomlin, Matt Redman, Matt Maher, Jason Ingram, Ben Glover	Chris Tomlin	5:14
2.	"Never Gonna Let Me Go"	Kristian Stanfill, Ingram	Kristian Stanfill	3:59
3.	"Let It Be Jesus"	Redman, Tomlin, Jonas Myrin	Christy Nockels	5:41
4.	"At the Cross (Love Ran Red)"	Tomlin, Ed Cash, Matt Armstrong, Redman, Myrin	Chris Tomlin	7:08
5.	"I Am"	David Crowder, Seth Philpott, Cash	Crowder	4:09
6.	"My Heart Is Yours"	Stanfill, Brett Younker, Daniel Carson, Ingram	Kristian Stanfill	7:07
7.	"Almighty"	Tomlin, Cash, Jared Anderson	Chris Tomlin	5:59
8.	"You Came To My Rescue"	Christy Nockels, Tomlin, Younker, Carson, Willie Weeks, Johnny Pike, Jorge Mhondera	Christy Nockels	4:50
9.	"Mercy"	Redman, Myrin	Matt Redman	5:26
10.	"Come As You Are"	Crowder, Maher, Glover	Crowder	4:43
11.	"Worthy"	Myrin, Tomlin, Redman	Matt Redman	4:40
12.	"This Grace"	Stanfill, Ingram	Kristian Stanfill	5:46
Total length:				64:42

Deluxe edition (additional tracks)
No.	Title	Artist(s)	Length
13.	"Sing And Shout"	Matt Redman
14.	"My Heart Is Yours (Radio Version)"	Kristian Stanfill

== Chart performance ==
Album

Chart (2014)	Peak position
US Billboard 200	4
US Top Christian Albums (Billboard)	1
US Digital Albums (Billboard)	7
