= Passion: White Flag =

Live album by Passion
- Released: March 13, 2012
- Recorded: January 2–5, 2012
- Venues: Georgia Dome, Atlanta, Georgia
- Genres: Worship, CCM
- Length: 74:17
- Label: Sixsteps
- Producer: Nathan Nockels

Passion chronology
| Passion: Here for You (2011) | Passion: White Flag (2012) | Passion: Let the Future Begin (2013) |

Singles from Passion: White Flag
- 1. "White Flag" Released: February 24, 2012; 2. "One Thing Remains" Released: September 18, 2012

Passion: White Flag is a collection of songs featuring sixstepsrecords artists Chris Tomlin, David Crowder Band, Charlie Hall, Matt Redman, Christy Nockels, and Kristian Stanfill. It was recorded live at Passion Conferences 2012 in Atlanta, Georgia, with more than 42,000 university-aged students in attendance. The album and its new song offerings reflect the desire of a generation to lay down their lives to live for the renown of Christ. The lead single, "White Flag", was released to radio airplay on February 24, 2012.

== Commercial performance ==
The album debuted at No. 96 on the Canadian Albums Chart. In the US, the album debuted at No. 5 on the Billboard 200, selling 48,000 copies. The album also debuted at No. 1 on the Top Christian Albums chart.

== Track listing ==
Album release
| No. | Title | Writer(s) | Artist(s) | Length |
|---|---|---|---|---|
| 1. | "Not Ashamed" | Bryan Brown, Tofer Brown, Matt Redman, Chris Tomlin | Kristian Stanfill | 5:22 |
| 2. | "White Flag" | Jason Ingram, Matt Maher, Redman, Tomlin | Chris Tomlin | 5:04 |
| 3. | "Jesus Son of God" | Ingram, Maher, Tomlin | Chris Tomlin & Christy Nockels | 6:14 |
| 4. | "How I Love You" | Christy Nockels, Tomlin | Christy Nockels | 2:50 |
| 5. | "All This Glory" | David Crowder, Louie Giglio | David Crowder*Band | 6:14 |
| 6. | "Lay Me Down" | Ingram, Jonas Myrin, Redman, Tomlin | Chris Tomlin & Matt Redman | 5:25 |
| 7. | "You Revive Me" | Audrey Assad, Maher, Tomlin | Christy Nockels | 7:16 |
| 8. | "One Thing Remains" | Christa Black Gifford, Brian Johnson, Jeremy Riddle | Kristian Stanfill | 5:49 |
| 9. | "Yahweh" | Ingram, Myrin, Tomlin | Chris Tomlin | 5:30 |
| 10. | "Sing Along" | Gifford, Ingram, C. Nockels, Nathan Nockels, Jesse Reeves | Christy Nockels | 5:13 |
| 11. | "The Only One" | Daniel Carson, Matt Gilder, Ingram, Maher, Reeves, Gabe Scott, Tomlin | Chris Tomlin | 3:40 |
| 12. | "Mystery" | Charlie Hall | Charlie Hall | 4:39 |
| 13. | "10,000 Reasons (Bless the Lord)" | Myrin, Redman | Matt Redman | 5:51 |
| 14. | "No Turning Back" | Ingram, Maher, Tomlin | Chris Tomlin | 5:17 |

Deluxe edition (additional tracks)
| No. | Title | Writer(s) | Artist(s) | Length |
|---|---|---|---|---|
| 15. | "Let Me Feel You Shine" | Crowder, Mark Waldrop | David Crowder*Band | 4:47 |
| 16. | "Who You Are" | | Kristian Stanfill | 5:39 |
| 17. | "Jesus, My All In All" | | Charlie Hall | 5:41 |
