= Jimi Cravity =

American Christian musician

- Also known as: Jimi Cravity
- Born: Maurice Eugene Willis; December 4, 1984 (age 41); Atlanta, Georgia, U.S.
- Origin: Atlanta, Georgia, U.S.
- Genres: Christian pop, Christian EDM, Christian R&B, Christian hip hop
- Occupations: Singer, songwriter
- Instrument: Vocals
- Years active: 2012–present
- Labels: Sparrow, Six Steps
- Website: jimicravity.com

Maurice Eugene Willis (born December 4, 1984), who goes by the stage name Jimi Cravity, is an American Christian musician, who primarily plays a style Christian pop, EDM, R&B, and hip hop music. He has released two musical works, both being extended plays, and Maverick (2012) and Heaven (2017) with Sparrow Records and Six Steps Records. The Heaven EP charted on two Billboard magazine charts.

== Early life and background ==
Maurice Eugene Willis was born on December 4, 1984, in Atlanta, Georgia.

== Music career ==
His music recording career started in 2012, with the extended play, Maverick, while it was released on May 20, 2012, independently. He released, Heaven, another extended play, on January 6, 2017, with Sparrow Records and Six Steps Records. This extended play charted on two Billboard magazine charts, while it placed on both the Christian Albums and Heatseekers Albums charts, where it peaked at Nos. 15 and 11, correspondingly.

== Personal life ==
Cravity is married.

== Discography ==
EPs

List of selected EPs, with selected chart positions
Title	Album details	Peak chart positions	
Title	Album details	US Christ.	US Heat.
Maverick	Released: May 20, 2012; Label: Jimi Cravity; Format: CD, download	—	—
Heaven	Released: January 6, 2017; Label: Sparrow/SixSteps; Format: CD, download	15	11

=== Singles ===
Year	Single	Peak chart positions			Album
Year	Single	US Christian	US Christian Air.	US Christian AC/CHR	Album
2017	"Believe"	37	30	4	Heaven
