= Passion: The Road to One Day =

Studio album by Passion
- Released: March 14, 2000
- Recorded: March 2000
- Genre: Contemporary Christian

Passion chronology
Passion: Better Is One Day (1999)	Passion: The Road to One Day (2000)	Passion: One Day Live (2000)

Passion: The Road to One Day is the "pre-One Day" studio album, containing music played in concerts leading up to the May 2000 "One Day" conference.

The album was released on March 14, 2000. Following its release, the album was ranked #1 on Billboard's weekly list of the top 50 "Heatseekers" albums.

== Track listing (CD) ==
1. Salvation - Charlie Hall (4:03)
2. Shout to the North - Charlie Hall (4:14)
3. The Noise We Make - Chris Tomlin (4:23)
4. Break Our Hearts - Shelley Nirider (5:26)
5. Make a Joyful Noise / I Will Not Be Silent - David Crowder (5:13)
6. Kindness - Chris Tomlin (5:59)
7. Holy Visitation (Between the Porch and the Alter) - Charlie Hall (4:58)
8. We Are Hungry - Steve Fee (5:54)
9. Prelude - Passion Worship Band (2:53)
10. Holy Roar - Christy Nockels (4:39)
11. Did You Feel the Mountains Tremble? - Matt Redman (7:22)
12. Jesus, Lover of My Soul - Shelley Nirider (4:16)
13. Track 13 (Blank Track)
14. Track 14 (Blank Track)
15. Track 15 (Blank Track)
16. Track 16 (Blank Track)
17. Track 17 (Blank Track)
18. Track 18 (Blank Track)
19. Track 19 (Blank Track)
20. Track 20 (Blank Track)
21. Track 21 (Blank Track)
22. Track 22 (Blank Track)
23. Track 23 (Blank Track)
24. Track 24 (Blank Track)
25. Track 25 (Blank Track)
26. 26:8 Sing Like the Saved - Steve Fee (3:53)

== Notes ==
Charlie Hall, Chris Tomlin, David Crowder, Christy Nockels, Shelley Nirider & Steve Fee
