= Kristian Stanfill =

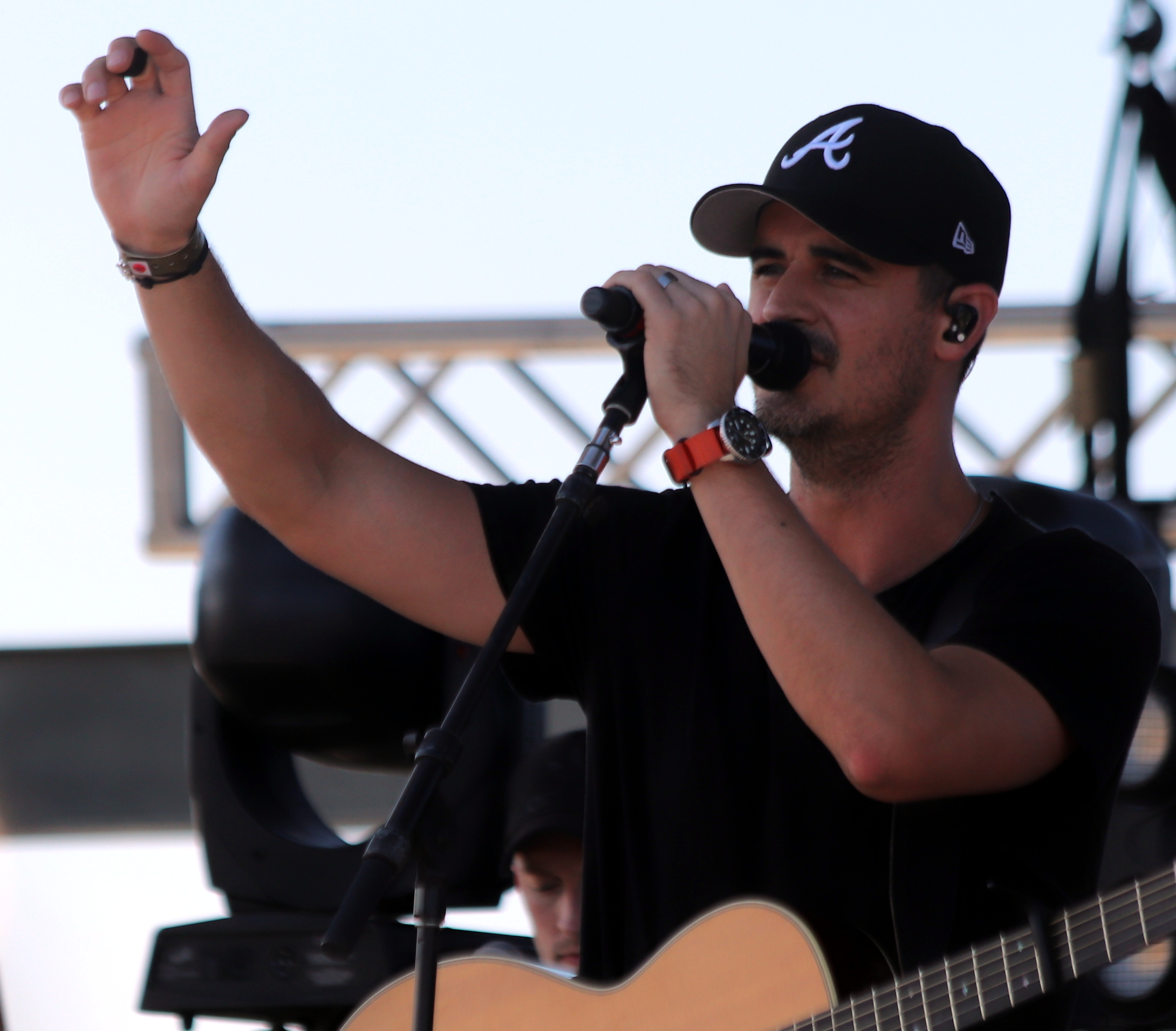
- Stanfill performing in 2019

Background information
- Born: Kristian Paul Stanfill; April 9, 1983 (age 43); Marietta, Georgia
- Origin: Atlanta, Georgia
- Genres: Contemporary Christian music, Christian pop, worship
- Occupations: Singer, songwriter
- Instruments: Vocals, guitar
- Years active: 2006–present
- Label: sixsteps
- Member of: Passion Worship Band
- Website: kristianstanfill.com

Kristian Paul Stanfill (born April 9, 1983) is an American contemporary Christian music singer, songwriter and worship leader from Atlanta, Georgia. His 2011 album Mountains Move reached No. 64 on the Billboard 200. He is currently the worship pastor at Passion City Church and a worship leader at Passion Conferences.

== Early life ==
Stanfill was born in Marietta, Georgia, on April 9, 1983. After showing an interest in songwriting, Stanfill began playing guitar at the age of 13. At age 15, he began to lead worship in his Sunday school at Johnson Ferry Baptist Church. In 2002, after graduating from George Walton Comprehensive High School, Stanfill attended Samford University. Shortly after graduating from Samford, he started leading worship at North Point Community Church in Alpharetta, Georgia. While in college, Stanfill met his wife, Kerri. They were married in 2004, and have four children. His brother, Brett, is also a worship leader and was a member of North Point Worship.

== Musical career ==
In 2005, Stanfill became involved with Passion City Church and the Passion organization, leading worship. On July 10, 2007, he independently released his debut EP, Hello, which features five songs. In 2008, Stanfill became the first artist in eight years to be signed to sixstepsrecords. In October 2008 and November 2008, he began working on his first studio album, Attention. It was completed by December 2008, and was released on April 21, 2009. His second album, Mountains Move, was released on January 7, 2011. It became his first album to appear on the Billboard 200 chart, and peaked at No. 64. The success of the album led him to be nominated for Best New Artist at the 42nd GMA Dove Awards. He released his third album, Make It Out Alive, on November 11, 2022, which referenced personal mental health struggles he had been dealing with over the course of the last two years.

== Personal life ==
On November 9, 2022, Stanfill revealed on an Instagram post that he was 730 days sober. Though he was previously private about his alcohol addiction on social media, he had been transparent with his wife, friends, pastors and counselors, all of whom were supportive of his recovery.

== Discography ==
- Hello EP (independently released, 2007)
- Attention (sixstepsrecords, 2009)
- Mountains Move (sixstepsrecords, 2011)
- Make It Out Alive (sixstepsrecords/Sparrow Records, 2022)

== Chart history ==
=== Albums ===
Year	Title	Peak chart positions	
Year	Title	US Christ	US
2009	Attention (EP)	24	—
2009	Attention	21	—
2010	Day After Day: KS (EP)	48	—
2011	Mountains Move	3	64

=== Singles ===
==== As a solo artist ====
Year	Title	Peak Chart Positions	Album
Year	Title	Hot Christian Songs	Album
2010	"Day After Day"	20	Mountains Move
2011	"Always"	28	Mountains Move

==== As a featured artist ====
Year	Title	Peak Chart Positions	Album
Year	Title	Hot Christian Songs	Album
2006	"Jesus Paid It All" (Passion featuring Kristian Stanfill)	—	Passion: Everything Glorious
2008	"Beautiful Jesus" (Passion featuring Kristian Stanfill)	—	God of This City
2010	"Say, Say" (Passion featuring Kristian Stanfill)	—	Passion: Awakening
2010	"The Stand" (Passion featuring Kristian Stanfill)	—	Passion: Awakening (Special Edition)
2011	"Forever Reign" (Passion featuring Kristian Stanfill)	—	Passion: Here for You
2011	"Always" (Passion featuring Kristian Stanfill)	—	Passion: Here for You
2012	"Not Ashamed" (Passion featuring Kristian Stanfill)	—	Passion: White Flag
2012	"One Thing Remains" (Passion featuring Kristian Stanfill)	1	Passion: White Flag
2012	"Who You Are" (Passion featuring Kristian Stanfill)	—	Passion: White Flag (Deluxe Edition)
2013	"The Lord Our God" (Passion featuring Kristian Stanfill)	18	Passion: Let The Future Begin
2013	"Children of Light" (Passion featuring Kristian Stanfill)	—	Passion: Let The Future Begin
2013	"Come To The Water" (Passion featuring Kristian Stanfill)	—	Passion: Let The Future Begin
2013	"In Christ Alone" (Passion featuring Kristian Stanfill)	32	Passion: Let The Future Begin
2014	"Never Gonna Let Me Go" (Passion featuring Kristian Stanfill)	—	Passion: Take It All
2014	"My Heart Is Yours" (Passion featuring Kristian Stanfill)	13	Passion: Take It All
2014	"This Grace" (Passion featuring Kristian Stanfill)	—	Passion: Take It All
2015	"Shout Hosanna" (Passion featuring Kristian Stanfill)	—	Passion: Even So Come
2015	"Draw Near" (Passion featuring Kristian Stanfill)	—	Passion: Even So Come
2015	"You Found Me" (Passion featuring Kristian Stanfill)	—	Passion: Even So Come
2015	"It Is Well" (Passion featuring Kristian Stanfill)	—	Passion: Even So Come (Deluxe Edition)
2015	"Even So Come" (Passion featuring Kristian Stanfill)	7	Even So Come (Radio Version / Live) - Digital Single
2016	"Salvation's Tide" (Passion featuring Kristian Stanfill)	32	Passion: Salvation's Tide Is Rising
2016	"Good Good Father" (Passion featuring Kristian Stanfill)	—	Passion: Salvation's Tide Is Rising
2017	"Glorious Day" (Passion featuring Kristian Stanfill)	25	Worthy of Your Name
2017	"How Great Is Your Love" (Passion featuring Kristian Stanfill)	50	Worthy of Your Name
2017	"Heart Abandoned" (Passion featuring Kristian Stanfill)	—	Worthy of Your Name
2017	"This We Know" (Passion featuring Kristian Stanfill)	35	Worthy of Your Name
2017	"This We Know (Studio Version)" (Passion featuring Kristian Stanfill)	—	Worthy of Your Name
2018	"Whole Heart" (Passion featuring Kristian Stanfill)	48	Whole Heart
2018	"God, You're So Good" (Passion featuring Kristian Stanfill and Melody Malone)	47	Whole Heart
2018	"More Like Jesus" (Passion featuring Kristian Stanfill)	—	Whole Heart
2019	"Behold The Lamb" (Passion featuring Kristian Stanfill)	—	Follow You Anywhere
2019	"Follow You Anywhere" (Passion featuring Kristian Stanfill)	45	Follow You Anywhere
2019	"God, You're So Good" (Passion featuring Kristian Stanfill and Melody Malone)	—	Follow You Anywhere
2020	"Passion 2020" (Passion featuring Kristian Stanfill and Melody Malone)	-	

== Accolades ==
=== GMA Dove Awards ===
Year	Award	Result
2007	Special Event Album of the Year (Passion: Everything Glorious)*	Won
2009	Special Event Album of the Year (Passion: God of This City)*	Won
2011	New Artist of the Year	Nominated
2011	Praise & Worship Album of the Year (Passion: Awakening)*	Nominated
2011	Special Event Album of the Year (Passion: Awakening)*	Won

- *Denotes a collaborative effort or a song contribution to a "Various artists" album.
