= Passion (worship band) =

Worship band from Atlanta Georgia

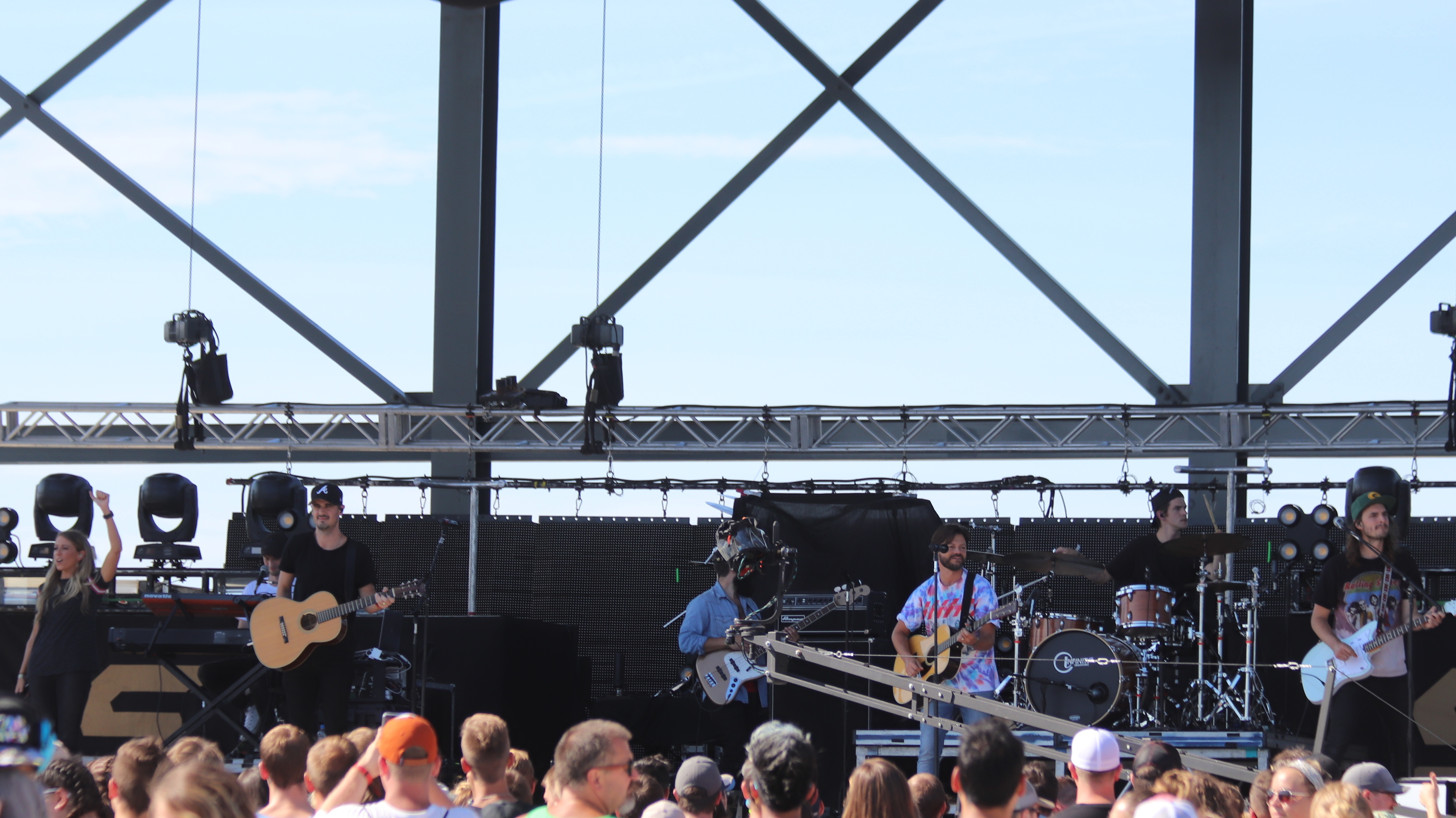
- Passion performing at Lifest in 2019

Background information
- Also known as: Passion Music
- Origin: Atlanta, Georgia, US
- Genres: Contemporary worship music, contemporary Christian music
- Years active: 1997–present
- Labels: sixstepsrecords; Capitol CMG; Sparrow
- Members: Kristian Stanfill; Melodie Malone; Brett Younker
- Website: passionmusic.com

Passion is a contemporary worship music band, a central part of Passion Conferences in Atlanta, Georgia. Passion band have released 28 albums over the span of two decades under the name Passion. Most of the Passion albums are live albums, recorded during performances in conferences or tours. Passion Conferences also owns sixstepsrecords, a record label that includes Crowder and Passion. Sixstepsrecords artists form the core group of artists performing at the Passion Gatherings, including Kristian Stanfill, Melodie Malone, and Brett Younker. Other artists that have performed at Passion Gatherings include Chris Tomlin, David Crowder, Charlie Hall, Matt Redman, Christy Nockels, Fee, Lecrae, Hillsong United, Jesus Culture, Kari Jobe, Tenth Avenue North, Shane and Shane, SonicFlood, Gungor, Rend Collective, Sean Curran, Colton Dixon, Capital Kings and Jimi Cravity.

== History ==
Passion's first record, Our Soul's Desire, was released in 1997 under Star Song Records. After Star Song artists transferred to Sparrow Records, Passion released two more live albums, including 1999's Better Is One Day, which saw Passion charting on the Billboard Christian Albums chart for the first time. In 2000, Passion Conferences founded sixstepsrecords as a division of Passion Conferences. As partners of Sparrow Records, a division of Capitol CMG, sixstepsrecords has many prominent contemporary Christian musicians under their label. Their first album on the newly created label, The Road to One Day, became the first Passion album to chart on the Billboard 200. Since the creation of sixstepsrecords, Passion has released more than twenty more live albums and two studio albums, nine of which have consecutively charted at No. 1 on the Billboard Christian Albums chart. The lead single off of 2012's live album White Flag, "One Thing Remains", became Passion's first No. 1 song on the Billboard Christian Songs chart. Passion's Let The Future Begin (2013) and Take It All (2014) both peaked at No. 4 on the Billboard 200, making them Passion's highest charting albums.

== Discography ==
- The Road to One Day (2000)
- Salvation's Tide Is Rising (2016)

== Awards and nominations ==
Year	Organization	Nominee / work	Category	Result	Ref.
2026	K-Love Fan Awards	"The Lord Will Provide"	Worship Song of the Year	Nominated	
2026	K-Love Fan Awards	Passion	Group of the Year	Nominated	
2026	Dove Awards	"Just That Good"	Long Form Music Video of the Year	Pending	
