= Passion Conferences =

Religious organization

- Founded: 1997
- Founder: Louie Giglio
- Type: 501(c)(3)
- Headquarters: 515 Garson Drive NE, Atlanta, Georgia
- Subsidiaries: Passion City Church; Passion; sixstepsrecords (music label); Passion Publishing
- Website: passionconferences.com

Passion Conferences (also referred to as Passion and the 268 Generation, originally named Choice Ministries) is a Christian organization founded by Louie Giglio and Chris Tomlin in 1997. The organization is known for its annual gatherings of young adults between the ages of 18 and 25, more specifically college students.

The organization is also responsible for sixstepsrecords, the worship band Passion, and the megachurch Passion City Church, which serves as the organization's headquarters. Until 2009, the headquarters were in Roswell, a suburb of Atlanta, Georgia. The first conference was Passion '97, held in Austin, Texas. According to the organization, its purpose is to unite college students for a "spiritual awakening in this generation." The foundation of the organization's purpose can be found in Isaiah 26:8.

Since its start, Passion Conferences has operated national conferences annually. In 2008, Passion Conferences launched its first global tour that visited 17 countries, starting in Kyiv, Ukraine and finishing in Sydney, Australia. Since then, Passion Conferences have continued to host gatherings and tours nationally and globally. Most conferences are held in Atlanta, Georgia, home of Passion's world headquarters, at either State Farm Arena or Mercedes-Benz Stadium.

== History ==
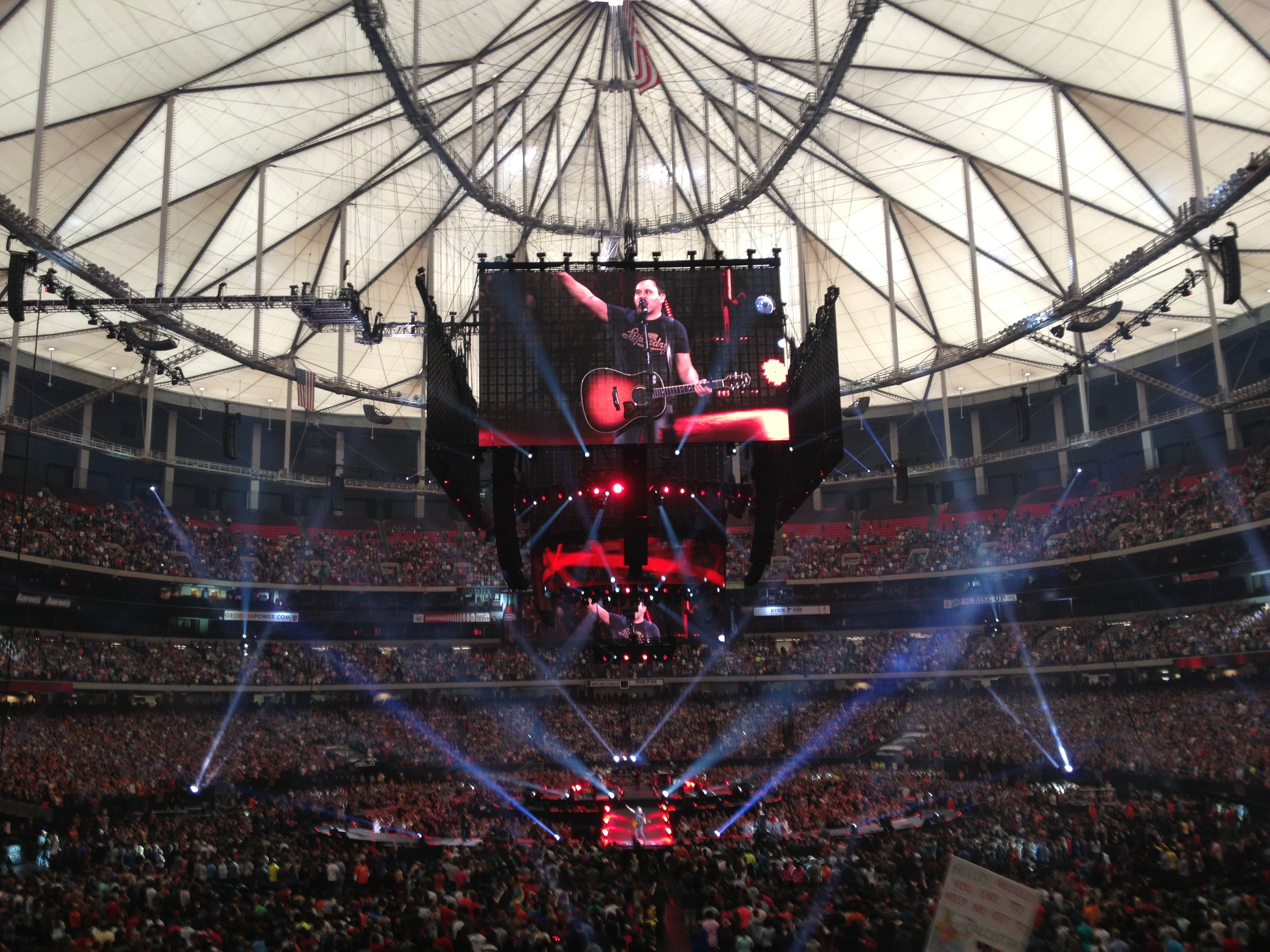
Passion Conferences, at Georgia Dome, Atlanta, in 2013

=== 1985–1997: Early years ===
In 1985, Louie and Shelley Giglio founded Choice Ministries at Baylor University in Waco, Texas. Choice Ministries began as a campus-based student ministry and after 10 years of ministry at Baylor, Louie and Shelley moved to Atlanta, Georgia. In 1997, Giglio along with Chris Tomlin founded Passion Conferences in Atlanta under the banner of Choice Ministries to see a spiritual awakening among college students all across the United States and the world.

=== 1997–2007: National success ===
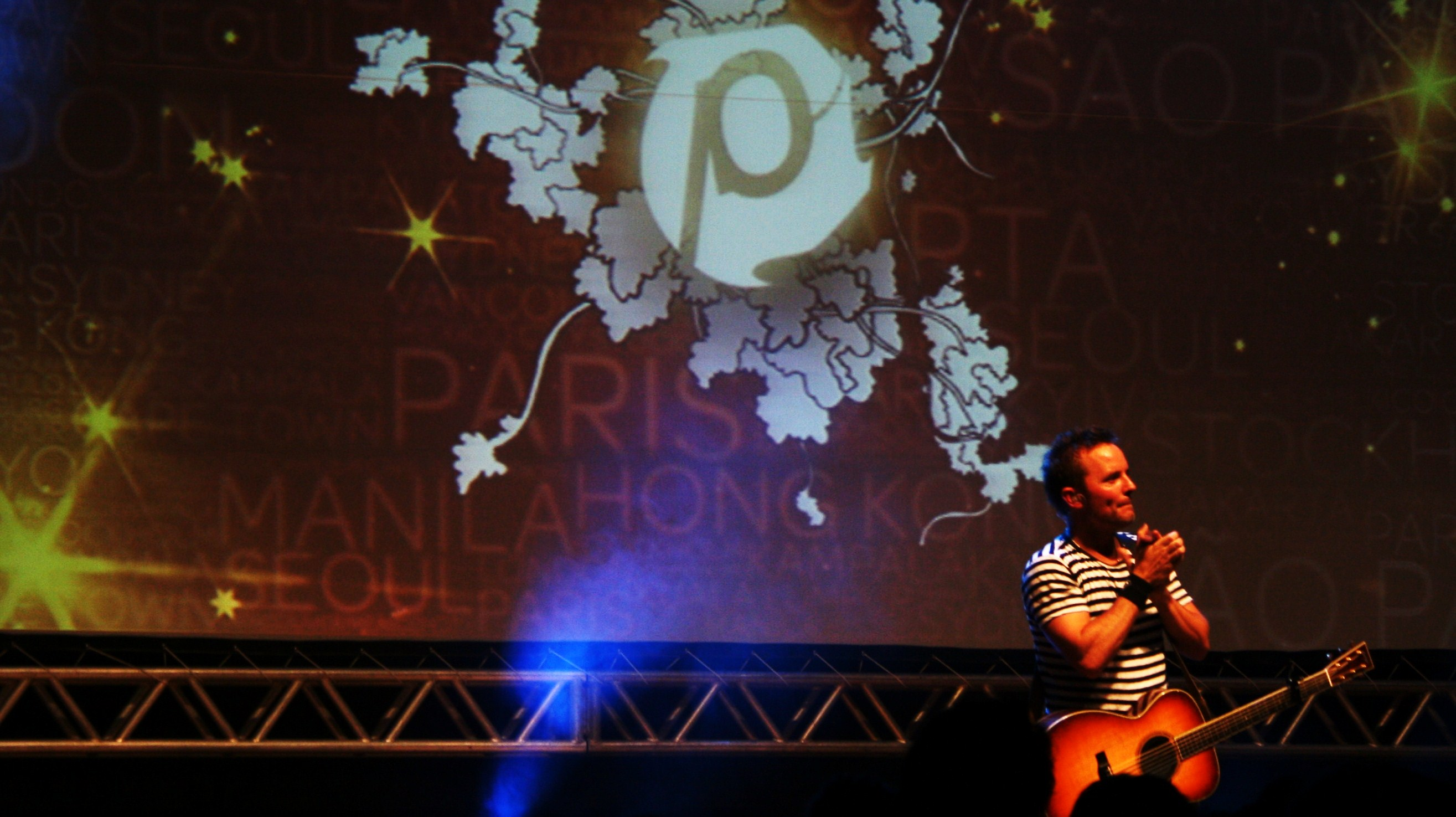
Chris Tomlin performing at the May 23–24, 2008 Passion Conference in São Paulo, Brazil.

The first conference took place in Austin, Texas where thousands of college aged students came together during January 1–4, 1997. The first event had 2,000 students in attendance. The following year grew to 5,000 attendees in Fort Worth. Passion have hosted five more national gatherings in the next decade (1998, 1999, 2005, 2006, 2007), which involved more than 70,000 college students in total. During this decade, thousands of additional college students connected with Passion through one of several other gatherings, including the OneDay Gatherings in 2000 and 2003 and the Passion Experience Tour. Passion also became known for its worship albums over this decade, which featured many prominent contemporary Christian artists like Matt Redman, Chris Tomlin, and David Crowder.

=== 2008–present: Passion City Church and world tours ===
In June 2008, while speaking for pastor Andy Stanley, Giglio announced the planting of Passion City Church in Atlanta, Georgia with Chris Tomlin. Along with Tomlin, Matt and Beth Redman, and a small core team, Passion City Church officially gathered in fall of 2008. Passion City Church held its first service on February 15, 2009, in Atlanta, Georgia at the Tabernacle. In 2017, Passion City Church announced plans to expand to two new locations - Passion City Church, Cumberland and Passion City Church, D.C.

Also in 2008, Passion Conferences embarked on its first world tour, reaching out to 17 different cities in six continents. Passion has continued to launch world tours and regular tours throughout the years, including Passion NYC Subway Series, Regionals '07–'08, Passion 2010 University Tour, Passion 2012 University Tour, A Night of Worship with Passion Tour, Passion: Let the Future Begin Tour, and Passion: Take It All Tour.

In 2017, Passion held its annual collegiate event in Atlanta's Georgia Dome, former home of the Atlanta Falcons before renovations. That year, Passion encouraged participants to sponsor more than 7,000 children from Compassion International. The conference also saw the debut of sixsteprecords artist Jimi Cravity and the appearance of country music singer Carrie Underwood, which incited backlash from some right-wing Christian fundamentalists.

Passion 2019 was held in four sold-out arenas and churches throughout the United States, including Atlanta's State Farm Arena, Duluth's (Georgia) Infinite Energy Center, and in the cities of Dallas, Texas and Washington, D.C.

Passion 2020 was held at Mercedes-Benz Stadium in Atlanta, Georgia, a return to a single stadium. More than 50,000 people were in attendance, the largest of the Passion gatherings.

In 2024, Passion hosted its third conference at Mercedes-Benz Stadium, with approximately 55,000 students in attendance from the evening of January 3 to the morning of January 5. Musical artists included Crowder, Sean Curran, Kari Jobe Carnes, Cody Carnes, Brooke Ligertwood, KB, Phil Wickham, and Brandon Lake. Speakers included Louie & Shelley Giglio, Sadie Robertson Huff & Christian Huff, Christine Caine, Ben Stuart, Levi Lusko, Jonathan Pokluda, and Earl McLellan.

In 2025, they brought together 40,000 people in two separate events.

Passion 2026 was held at Globe Life Field in Arlington, TX, from January 1-3, 2026. Musical talent included Crowder, KB, Kari Jobe, Cody Carnes, Brooke Ligertwood, and of course, Passion Music. Speakers included Louie and Shelley Giglio, Sadie Robertson Huff, Jonathan Pokluda, Christine Caine, and others.

== Conferences ==
Passion's annual conferences attract around 65,000 participants. The conference invites prominent Christian speakers and musical artists annually.

=== Speakers ===
Pastor Louie Giglio, founder of Passion, often speaks during the conferences. John Piper is also a frequent speaker at Passion Conferences. Other speakers that have spoken at Passion Gatherings include: Francis Chan, Andy Stanley, Beth Moore, Judah Smith, Nick Rodriguez, Christine Caine, Carl Lentz, Lecrae, Gary Haugen, Ben Stuart, David Platt, Matt Chandler, Levi Lusko, and Jay and Katherine Wolf, authors of the book "Hope Heals".

=== Music ===
Passion (worship band) has released 28 albums over two decades. Most of the Passion albums are live albums, recorded during performances in conferences or tours. Passion Conferences also owns the record label Sixstepsrecords, whose artist roster includes Crowder and Passion.

Sixstepsrecords artists form the core group of artists performing at the Passion Gatherings, including Chris Tomlin, David Crowder, Charlie Hall, Matt Redman, Christy Nockels, Kristian Stanfill, Melodie Malone, Brett Younker, and Jimi Cravity.

Other artists that have performed at Passion Gatherings include Lecrae, Hillsong United, Jesus Culture, Kari Jobe, Tenth Avenue North, Shane and Shane, SonicFlood, Gungor, Rend Collective, and Sean Curran of Bellarive.

=== Door holders ===
The men and women who volunteer at the conferences are called door holders. They serve on different teams such as community groups, logistics and registration and are considered to be at the core of the gatherings. They travel from all over the nation to serve at these gatherings. At various times throughout the year Passion City Church has special events for Door Holders.

== Charitable contributions ==
In 2011, Passion started the Do Something Now fundraising campaign, later renamed 72DaysForFreedom. The fundraising campaign encourages participants in Passion's annual conferences to donate to different charitable organizations. In the Passion 2011 conference, more than 22,000 students raised over $1.1 million towards multiple causes. At the 2012 conference, students raised $3.3 million to fund seven different organizations that battle sex trafficking. Passion 2013 saw the launch of the End It Movement, an anti-human trafficking fundraising campaign. Attendees gave more than $3.6 million towards various causes at this conference.

At the 2015 Atlanta conference, attendees collected items to donate to Atlanta's City of Refuge homeless ministry. In 2016, participants raised more than $800,000 towards Project Haraka حركة, a partnership with World Vision USA to fund the building of a health facility in Syria. The building is intended to serve as the first newborn ICU in opposition-controlled Syria. Passion 2017 saw the start of the Make History Together fundraising campaign, in which the organization partnered with Compassion International to sponsor children in poverty around the world. The students sponsored more than 7,000 children in total, including all of the Compassion International children from El Salvador, Rwanda, Indonesia, and Tanzania, and another 900 children from Bolivia, creating the largest surge of sponsorships in Compassion International's 65-year history.

== Music ==
Passion
- Also known as: Passion Music
- Origin: Atlanta, Georgia, US
- Genres: Contemporary worship music, contemporary Christian music
- Years active: 1997–present
- Labels: sixstepsrecords; Capitol CMG; Sparrow Records
- Members: Chris Tomlin; Charlie Hall; Crowder; Kristian Stanfill; Christy Nockels; Matt Redman; Melodie Malone; Brett Younker; Jimi Cravity

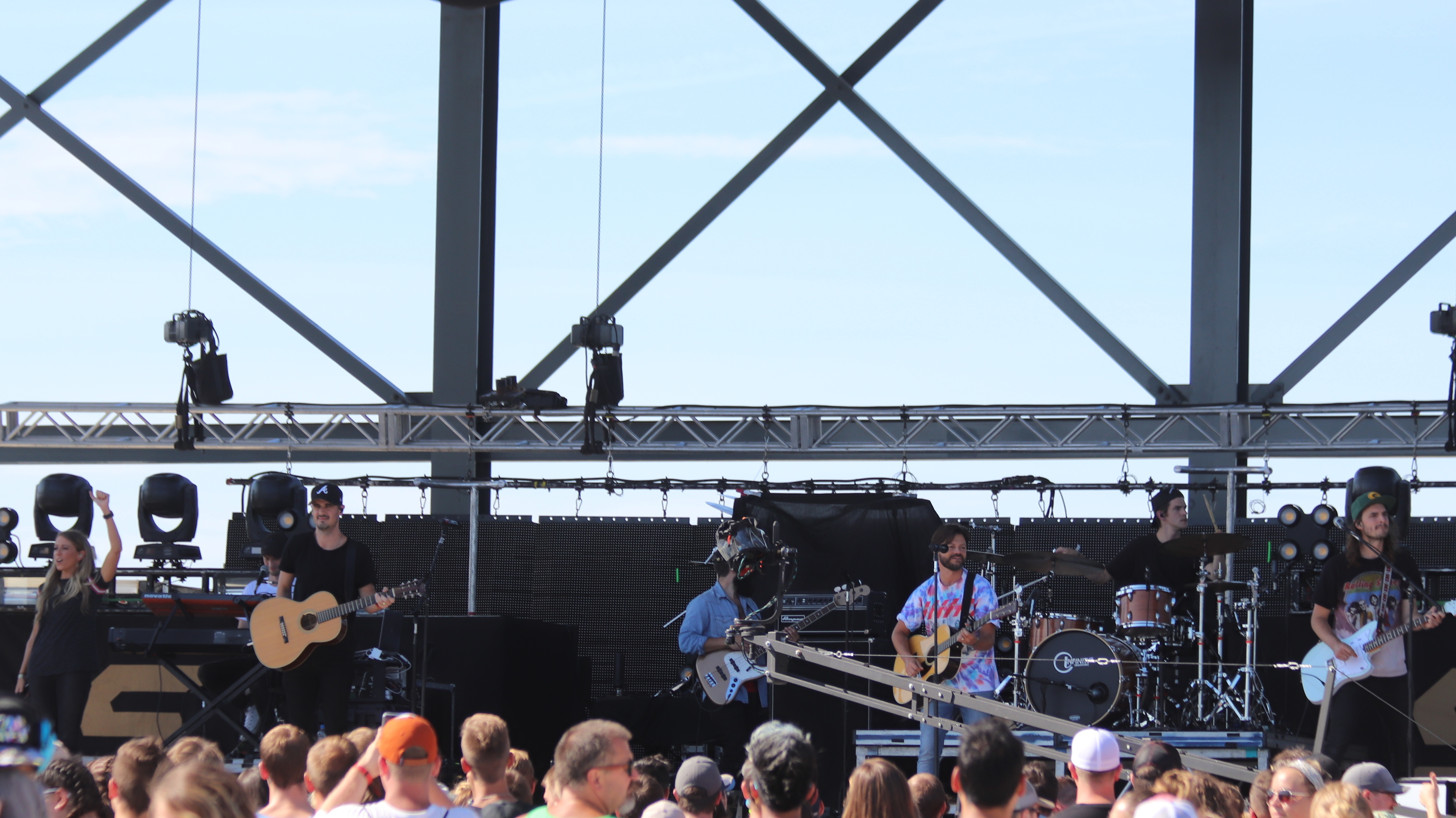
Passion Music performing at Lifest in 2019

Passion Conferences have released 28 albums over the span of 2 decades under the name Passion. Most of the Passion albums are live albums, recorded during performances in conferences or tours. Passion Conferences also owns sixstepsrecords, a record label that includes Crowder and Passion.

Passion's first record, Our Soul's Desire, was released in 1997 under Star Song Records. After Star Song artists transferred to Sparrow Records, Passion released two more live albums, including 1999's Better Is One Day, which saw Passion charting on the Billboard Christian Albums chart for the first time. In 2000, Passion Conferences founded sixstepsrecords as a division of Passion Conferences. As partners of Sparrow Records, a division of Capitol CMG, sixstepsrecords has many prominent contemporary Christian musicians under their label. Their first album on the newly created label, The Road to One Day, became the first Passion album to chart on the Billboard 200.

Since the creation of sixstepsrecords, Passion has released more than twenty more live albums and two studio albums, nine of which have consecutively charted at No. 1 on the Billboard Christian Albums chart. The lead single off of 2012's live album White Flag, "One Thing Remains", became Passion's first No. 1 song on the Billboard Christian Songs chart. Passion's Let The Future Begin (2013) and Take It All (2014) both peaked at No. 4 on the Billboard 200, making them Passion's highest charting albums.

== Discography ==
- Road to One Day (2000)
- Salvation's Tide Is Rising (2016)
