= Brooke Fraser discography =

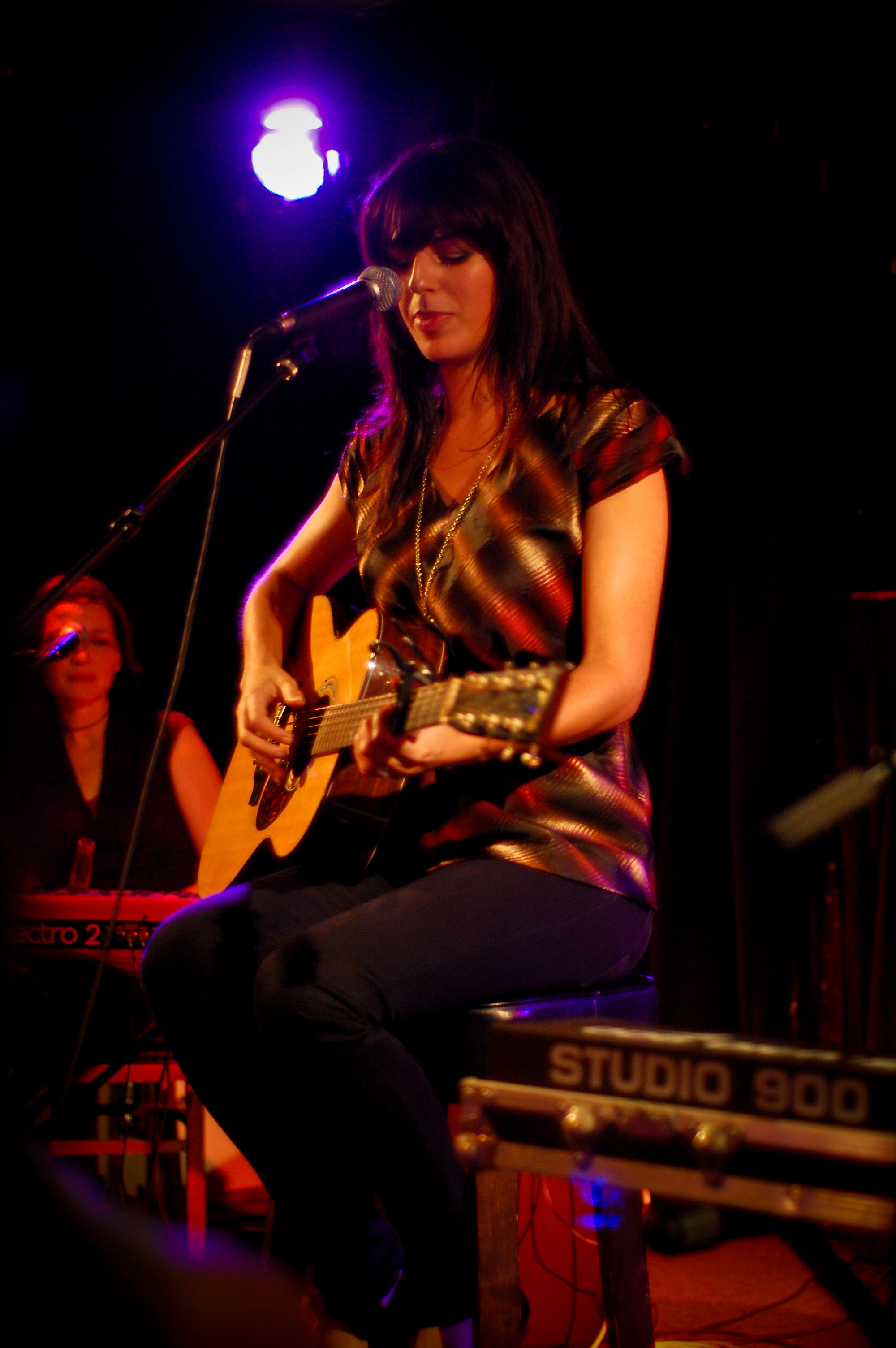
- Fraser touring in California in 2008
- Studio albums: 6
- Live albums: 1
- Compilation albums: 2
- Singles: 19
- Music videos: 13

New Zealand singer and songwriter Brooke Fraser has released six studio albums, two compilation albums, a live album, 19 singles (including two as a featured artist), three promotional singles, and 13 music videos. Fraser grew up musically active and signed to Sony BMG in 2002. In 2003, she released her debut single, "Better", which peaked at number three on the New Zealand Singles Chart. Her debut album, What to Do with Daylight (2003), was released the same year, debuting at number on the New Zealand Albums Chart and was eventually certified seven-times Platinum by the Recorded Music NZ (RMNZ). The album also spawned the singles "Lifeline", "Saving the World", "Arithmetic" and "Without You"; all of which reached the top 20 of the NZ Singles Chart.

Fraser's second studio album, Albertine, was released on 5 December 2006 and also debuted atop the NZ Albums Chart. The album, inspired by Fraser's visit to Rwanda, was preceded by the top-five single "Deciphering Me", and followed with "Shadowfeet". The latter single reached number nine on the R&R chart (a chart for plays on American Christian music radio stations) in September 2008. The album also became the first to chart internationally, peaking at number 90 on the US Billboard 200, number three on the US Top Christian Albums chart, and number 26 on the Australian Albums Chart. The album was later certified four-times platinum by the RMNZ, gold in Australia and has since sold over 60,000 copies in North America. From 2005 to 2010, Fraser was involved with the Hillsong Church's worship band Hillsong Worship.

In 2010, Fraser returned to pop music, and debuted atop the NZ Albums Chart for a third time consecutively, with her third studio album Flags. The album was released to critical and commercial success, peaking at number three in Australia, number 80 in Canada, and number 59 in the US. The album spawned the viral single "Something in the Water", which peaked atop the NZ Singles Chart, marking Fraser's first number-one in the country. She became the first New Zealand artist to have a number-one album and single simultaneously since 2004. The album was certified Gold in its first week, and has since been certified three-times Platinum by the RMNZ. Fraser followed this with her fourth studio album, Brutal Romantic (2014), which saw Fraser experiment with electronic music. The album spawned the single "Kings and Queens" which peaked at number 20 in NZ.

In 2016, Fraser returned to making music with Hillsong Worship under her married name, Brooke Ligertwood, appearing on the internationally successful album Let There Be Light which peaked at number 14 on the US Billboard 200, and debuted atop the US Top Christian Albums chart. Fraser co-wrote and performed the album's second single, "What a Beautiful Name", which peaked at number seven on the US Bubbling Under Hot 100 chart and number one on the US Hot Christian Songs chart, and also topped the latter's end-of-year chart. The song also won Fraser the Grammy Award for Best Contemporary Christian Music Performance/Song at the 60th Annual Grammy Awards. The song was later ranked by Billboard as the 3rd top Christian song of the decade.

In 2016 and 2018, Fraser released two compilation albums, A Sides and B Sides featuring various singles and unreleased demos under her Fraser moniker. The former gained the single "Therapy" which topped the NZ Heatseekers Singles Chart. After appearing on several Hillsong Worship songs including "Who You Say I Am" and "King of Kings", Fraser released her first live album, Seven (2022) under the Ligertwood name, which peaked at number 36 in NZ and 15 in the US. She followed this up with Eight (2023).

In 2024, Fraser returned to New Zealand to perform a live set at Spark Arena with the Auckland Philharmonia. The concert was recorded by RNZ and released as a live album on 21 November 2025.

== Albums ==
=== Studio albums ===
List of studio albums, with selected chart positions
Title	Album details	Peak chart positions							Certifications (sales thresholds)
Title	Album details	NZ	AUS	CAN	SWI	US	US Christ	US Indie	Certifications (sales thresholds)
What to Do with Daylight	Released: 29 October 2003; Label: Columbia, Sony BMG; Formats: CD, digital download	1	85	—	—	—	—	—	RMNZ: 7× Platinum
Albertine	Released: 5 December 2006; Label: Columbia; Formats: CD, digital download	1	29	—	—	90	3	9	RMNZ: 4× Platinum; ARIA: Gold
Flags	Released: 8 October 2010; Label: Sony Music Entertainment; Formats: CD, digital download	1	3	80	9	59	—	9	RMNZ: 3× Platinum
Brutal Romantic	Released: 17 November 2014; Label: Sony Music Entertainment; Formats: CD, digital download	6	23	—	—	157	9	19	
Eight	Released as Brooke Ligertwood; Released: 20 October 2023; Label: Capitol CMG; Formats: CD, digital download, streaming	— (Note: Eight did not enter NZ Top 40 Albums Chart, but peaked at number 6 on the Top Aotearoa Albums chart.)	—	—	—	—	21	—	
Eat	Releasing as Brooke Ligertwood; Released: 15 May 2026; Label: Capitol CMG; Formats: CD, digital download, streaming	— (Note: Eat did not enter NZ Top 40 Albums Chart, but peaked at number 6 on the Top Aotearoa Albums chart.)	—	—	—	—	—	—	
"—" denotes a recording that did not chart

=== Live albums ===
List of live albums
Title	Album details	Peak chart positions	
Title	Album details	NZ	US Christ
Seven	Released as Brooke Ligertwood; Released: 25 February 2022; Label: Capitol CMG; Format: Digital download, streaming	36	15
Infinity	Released as Brooke Ligertwood; Released: 8 August 2024; Label: Capitol CMG; Format: Digital download, streaming	—	—
Live with the Auckland Philharmonia (with the Auckland Philharmonia)	Released as Brooke Fraser; Release: 21 November 2025; Label: Indepdendent; Format: Digital download, streaming	—	—

=== Compilation albums ===
List of compilation albums, with selected chart positions
Title	Album details	Peak chart positions	Certifications (sales thresholds)
Title	Album details	NZ	Certifications (sales thresholds)
A Sides	Released: 25 November 2016; Label: Sony Music Entertainment; Formats: CD, digital download	16	RMNZ: Platinum
B Sides	Released: 16 November 2018; Label: Sony Music Entertainment; Formats: CD, digital download	—	
"—" denotes a recording that did not chart

== Singles ==
=== As lead artist ===
List of singles and peak chart positions
Title	Year	Chart positions						Certifications (sales thresholds)	Album
Title	Year	NZ	AUS	GER	UK	US Christ	US Christ Air.	Certifications (sales thresholds)	Album
"Better"	2003	3	—	—	—	—	—		What to Do with Daylight
"Lifeline"	2003	7	56	—	—	—	—		What to Do with Daylight
"Saving the World"	2004	15	—	—	—	—	—		What to Do with Daylight
"Arithmetic"	2004	8	—	—	—	—	—	RMNZ: Gold	What to Do with Daylight
"Without You"	2005	16	—	—	—	—	—		What to Do with Daylight
"Deciphering Me"	2006	4	—	—	—	—	—	RMNZ: Gold	Albertine
"Shadowfeet"	2007	13	—	—	—	13		RMNZ: Gold	Albertine
"Albertine"	2007	—	—	—	—	—	—		Albertine
"Something in the Water"	2010	1	29	8	193	—	—	RMNZ: Platinum; BVMI: Gold	Flags
"Betty"	2010	30	—	—	—	—	—		Flags
"Coachella"	2011	—	—	—	—	—	—		Flags
"Kings & Queens"	2014	20	—	—	—	—	—	RMNZ: Gold	Brutal Romantic
"Therapy"	2016	— (Note: "Therapy" did not enter the NZ Top 40 Singles Chart, but peaked at number 1 on the NZ Heatseekers Singles Chart.)	—	—	—	—	—	RMNZ: Gold	A Sides
"A Thousand Hallelujahs"	2022	— (Note: "A Thousand Hallelujahs" did not enter the NZ Top 40 Singles Chart, but peaked at number 8 on the Hot Aotearoa Singles.)	—	—	—	44	38		Seven
"Honey in the Rock" (with Brandon Lake)	2022	— (Note: "Honey in the Rock" did not enter the NZ Top 40 Singles Chart, but peaked at number 23 on the NZ Hot Singles Chart.)	—	—	—	7	9	RIAA: Gold	Seven
"Fear of God"	2023	— (Note: "Fear of God" did not enter the NZ Top 40 Singles Chart, but peaked at number 5 on the Hot Aotearoa Singles.)	—	—	—	—	—		Eight
"Bless God"	2023	— (Note: "Bless God" did not enter the NZ Top 40 Singles Chart, but peaked at number 8 on the Hot Aotearoa Singles chart.)	—	—	—	23	—		Eight
"Jesus Lifted Me" (with Cain)	2025	— (Note: "Jesus Lifted Me" did not enter the NZ Top 40 Singles Chart, but peaked at number 13 on the Hot 20 Aotearoa Singles Chart.)	—	—	—	47	—		Non-album singles
"Garment of Praise" (with Passion)	2025	—	—	—	—	—	—		Non-album singles
"—" denotes a recording that did not chart

=== As featured artist ===
List of singles and peak chart positions
Title	Year	Chart positions	Album
Title	Year	NZ	Album
"Feel Inside (And Stuff Like That)" (as part of Flight of the Conchords)	2012	1	Non-album singles
"Team, Ball, Player, Thing" (#KiwisCureBatten featuring Lorde, Kimbra, Brooke Fraser, et al.)	2015	2	Non-album singles
"Holy Song" (featuring Bethel Music)	2024	— (Note: "Holy Song" did not enter the NZ Top 40 Singles Chart, but peaked at number 3 on the Hot 20 Aotearoa Singles Chart.)	We Must Respond

== Promotional singles ==
List of promotional singles and peak chart positions
Title	Year	Chart positions	Album
Title	Year	NZ Aot.	Album
"C.S. Lewis Song"	2007	—	Albertine
"Psychosocial"	2014	—	Brutal Romantic
"Nineveh"	2022	9	Seven
"Even Death on a Cross!"	2026	11	Eat
"The Water" (with Victory Boyd)	2026	—	Eat
"—" denotes a recording that did not chart

== Other charted songs ==
=== As lead artist ===
List of charted songs and peak chart positions
Title	Year	Chart positions			Certifications (sales thresholds)	Album
Title	Year	NZ Aot.	NZ Air.	US Christ	Certifications (sales thresholds)	Album
"Agnus Dei / King of Kings" (with Hillsong Worship, Passion, Chidima, Jenn Johnson)	2021	—	—	50	RIAA: Gold	At Easter
"Ancient Gates"	2022	12	—	—		Seven
"Communion"	2022	15	—	—		Seven
"Every Chance I Get"	2023	11	—	—		Eight
"Watchmen" (with Lauren Daigle and the New Respects)	2026	6	25	50		Eat
"Lest I Sleep"	2026	10	—	—		Eat
"In the Land of the living"	2026	9	—	—		Eat
"—" denotes a recording that did not chart

=== As featured artist ===
List of charted songs and peak chart positions
Title	Year	Chart positions	Album
Title	Year	US Christ	Album
"Resurrender" (Hillsong Worship featuring Brooke Ligertwood)	2021	44	These Same Skies

== Music videos ==
Year	Title	Director
2003	"Better"	
2003	"Lifeline"	
2004	"Saving the World"	
2004	"Arithmetic"	Tim Groenendaal
2005	"Without You"	
2006	"Deciphering Me"	Anthony Rose
2006	"C.S. Lewis Song"	
2007	"Shadowfeet"	
2007	"Albertine"	Anthony Rose
2010	"Something in the Water"	Joel Kefali & Campbell Hooper
2010	"Betty"	Joe Kefali & Campbell Hooper
2011	"Coachella"	Shae Sterling
2014	"Psychosocial"	
2014	"Kings & Queens"	
2024	"Shadowfeet (Live in Spark Arena)"	Richard Cause
