= Seven (Brooke Ligertwood album) =

Live album by Brooke Ligertwood
- Released: 25 February 2022
- Recorded: 11 November 2021
- Venue: The Belonging Co, Nashville, Tennessee, US
- Genre: Contemporary worship
- Length: 56:35
- Label: Sparrow; Capitol CMG
- Producer: Brooke Ligertwood; Jason Ingram

Brooke Ligertwood chronology
B Sides (2018)	Seven (2022)	Eight (2023)

Singles from Seven
- 1. "A Thousand Hallelujahs" Released: 14 January 2022; 2. "Honey in the Rock" Released: 25 March 2022

Seven is the first live album by New Zealand singer-songwriter Brooke Ligertwood (Note: It is also her first album be released under her married name, with previous albums being released under her maiden name Brooke Fraser.), and her seventh solo album overall. It was released on 25 February 2022, via Sparrow Records and Capitol Christian Music Group. The album features a guest appearance by Brandon Lake. The album was recorded on 11 November 2021, at The Belonging Co in Nashville, Tennessee. Ligertwood collaborated with Jason Ingram in handling the production of the album.

The album has been supported by the release of "A Thousand Hallelujahs" and "Honey in the Rock" as singles. "A Thousand Hallelujahs" peaked at number 44 on the US Hot Christian Songs chart. "Honey in the Rock" peaked at number seven on the Hot Christian Songs chart. "Nineveh" was also released as promotional single.

Seven debuted at number 36 on the New Zealand Top 40 Albums chart, and at number 15 on the Top Christian Albums chart in the United States. Seven received two GMA Dove Award nominations for Worship Album of the Year and Recorded Music Packaging of the Year at the 2022 GMA Dove Awards.

== Background ==
In October 2021, Ligertwood announced that she would be releasing Seven, a live worship album, in 2022. The album recording was held on 11 November 2021, at The Belonging Co, a church in Nashville, Tennessee. Seven marks Ligertwood's first solo live project, and the seventh overall release in her solo career. Her previous solo releases were billed under her maiden name, Brooke Fraser, while concurrently serving as part of Hillsong Worship as a worship leader and songwriter, co-writing critically acclaimed worship songs such as "What a Beautiful Name," and "King of Kings." The album also marks her first solo album of original music since Brutal Romantic (2014) and the first to explore explicitly Christian and biblical themes.

In the process of creating the album, Brooke Ligertwood co-wrote the songs with her husband and longtime collaborator Scott Ligertwood, Jason Ingram, as well as Steven Furtick and Brandon Lake among others. The album features a band spanning the worship movement, with musicians from Hillsong, Bethel and Vineyard, along with 30 piece choir. Ligertwood has said that Seven cannot be placed within the context of her Brooke Fraser catalogue because the collection of songs was intended for the church, thus inspiring the title, and that the album being her seventh solo record was incidental. Ligertwood elaborated that the title of the album was drawn from the bible in Revelation 1, wherein John the Apostle received instruction to write down his vision and send letters to the seven churches, expressing that she also had written down what she had been given and sending it to the church. Ligertwood emphasised that she had no desire to release a worship album under her own name, but ended up doing so "because of how the songs came about and the way I knew it needed to be made and released into the world."

== Release and promotion ==
=== Singles ===
"A Thousand Hallelujahs" was released as the lead single of Seven on 14 January 2022, accompanied with its live music video. "A Thousand Hallelujahs" debuted at number 44 on the Hot Christian Songs chart.

"Honey in the Rock" with Brandon Lake was impacted Christian radio stations in the United States on 25 March 2022, as the second single from the album. "Honey in the Rock" peaked at number seven on the Hot Christian Songs chart.

=== Promotional singles ===
"Nineveh" was released as the first and only promotional single from the album on 4 February 2022, accompanied with its live music video.

== Reception ==
=== Critical response ===
Professional ratings
Review scores
Source	Rating
365 Days of Inspiring Media	5/5
JubileeCast	5/5

Timothy Yap of JubileeCast wrote a positive review of the album, saying "If you are looking for worship songs that delve deeper than the recycled lyrical tropes and cliches, give this album a go. These songs are creatively and poetically worded and they are thoughtfully and prayerfully executed." In a NewReleaseToday review, Jasmine Patterson commended Ligertwood's effort on the project, saying: "Brooke Ligertwood makes bold choices on this album that are so refreshing. I so appreciate her fearlessness to take risks and lead God’s people where He’s calling us to go through the messages of these songs. Every moment on Seven is holy and precious. This album will lead you into an experience with God in both personal and corporate times of worship." Gerod Bass of Worship Musician magazine wrote a positive review of the album, saying "Brooke Ligertwood writes with depth and forethought and her delivery of these songs are sweet and honest. I would have liked one or two more upbeat tracks, but this is still a really good album." Jonathan Andre in his 365 Days of Inspiring Media review opined that "Seven is one of my favourites of 2022 thus far, and needs to be listened to, at least once, by anyone who’s a fan of Brooke, worship music, or both. Well done Brooke for Seven. Looking forward to what the Lord has in store for this album, in the upcoming weeks and months ahead."

=== Accolades ===
Awards
Year	Organization	Award	Result	Ref
2022	GMA Dove Awards	Worship Album of the Year	Nominated	
2022	GMA Dove Awards	Recorded Music Packaging of the Year	Nominated	

== Commercial performance ==
Seven debuted at number 36 on the New Zealand Top 40 Albums chart. In the United States, Seven debuted at number 15 on Top Christian Albums chart dated 12 March 2022.

== Track listing ==
Seven track listing
No.	Title	Writer(s)	Length
1.	"Ancient Gates"	Brooke Ligertwood; Jason Ingram; Scott Ligertwood	5:25
2.	"Banner"	B. Ligertwood; Ingram; S. Ligertwood	3:59
3.	"A Thousand Hallelujahs"	B. Ligertwood; Phil Wickham; S. Ligertwood	5:09
4.	"Communion"	B. Ligertwood; Ingram; S. Ligertwood	6:21
5.	"Communion (Meditation)"	B. Ligertwood; Ingram; S. Ligertwood	6:31
6.	"Nineveh"	B. Ligertwood; Steven Furtick	4:28
7.	"Burn"	B. Ligertwood; Furtick	4:51
8.	"Honey in the Rock" (with Brandon Lake)	Brandon Lake; B. Ligertwood; Mitch Wong	4:44
9.	"I Belong to Jesus (Dylan's Song)"	B. Ligertwood; Chris Davenport	5:40
10.	"King Jesus"	B. Ligertwood	9:27
Total length:			56:35

Seven – Apple Music bonus video content
No.	Title	Length
11.	"A Thousand Hallelujahs" (live in Nashville, TN/2021)	5:11
12.	"Nineveh" (live in Nashville, TN/2021)	4:28
13.	"Honey in the Rock" (with Brandon Lake; live in Nashville, TN/2021)	4:46

== Charts ==
=== Weekly charts ===
Weekly chart performance for Seven
Chart (2022)	Peak position
New Zealand Albums (RMNZ)	36
UK Album Downloads (OCC)	75
US Top Christian Albums (Billboard)	15
US Heatseekers Albums (Billboard)	16

=== Year-end charts ===
Year-end chart performance for Seven
Chart (2022)	Position
US Christian Albums (Billboard)	52
Chart (2023)	Position
US Christian Albums (Billboard)	34

== Release history ==
Release history and formats for Seven
Region	Date	Format(s)	Label(s)	Ref.
Various	25 February 2022	Digital download; streaming	Sparrow Records; Capitol Christian Music Group	
