= A-Sides (disambiguation) =

A-Sides is a 1997 compilation album by Soundgarden.

A-Sides may also refer to:

- A-side, the featured song of a music single
- A Sides (Brooke Fraser album), a 2016 compilation album
- The A-Sides, a 2000s American indie rock band

== See also ==
- B-Sides (disambiguation)
