= Saving the World =

Single by Brooke Fraser

from the album What to Do with Daylight
- Released: March 14, 2004
- Length: 4:10 (album version)
- Label: Columbia
- Songwriter(s): Brooke Fraser
- Producer(s): Brady Blade

Brooke Fraser singles chronology
"Lifeline" (2004)	"Saving the World" (2004)	"Arithmetic" (2004)

"Saving the World" is a song by New Zealand singer-songwriter Brooke Fraser, released as the third single from her debut album, What to Do with Daylight, in 2004. The song peaked at number 15 on the New Zealand Singles Chart in May 2004.

== Track listing ==
1. "Saving the World"
2. "Better" (live version)
3. "Without You" (live version)

== Charts ==
Chart (2004)	Peak position
New Zealand (Recorded Music NZ)	15
