= Awake (Hillsong Worship album) =

Studio album by Hillsong Worship
- Released: 11 October 2019
- Studio: Orange County, California; Sydney, Australia
- Genre: Contemporary worship music
- Length: 78:01
- Label: Hillsong Music
- Producer: Brooke Ligertwood; Michael Guy Chislett

Hillsong Worship studio album chronology
Hay Más (2019)	Awake (2019)	Take Heart (Again) (2020)

Hillsong Worship chronology
There Is More (2018)	Awake (2019)	Take Heart (Again) (2020)

Singles from Awake
- 1. "King of Kings" Released: 12 July 2019; 2. "Awake My Soul" Released: 19 June 2020

Awake is the fifth studio album (twenty-seventh album overall) by Australian worship group Hillsong Worship, released on 11 October 2019. It is the group's first studio album in 15 years, with the last being Faithful (2004). The album was preceded by the lead single "King of Kings", released on 12 July 2019. On 19 June 2020, "Awake My Soul" was released as the second single, which features Tasha Cobbs Leonard; it is the group's first collaboration since 2004. In 2020, Awake was awarded Worship Album of the Year at the 51st GMA Dove Awards.

== Background ==
The album was recorded over the course of six months at both a studio in Orange County, California and in Sydney, Australia. Worship leader and co-producer Brooke Ligertwood revealed that recording at the Orange County studio was interrupted by "multiple mishaps with storms causing power outages and all kinds of crazy little discomforts", going on to say that she was a "touch traumatized" from the experience.

In an interview with The Christian Post, Ligertwood said the album's main theme is "invitation into more revelation".

== Critical reception ==
Professional ratings
Review scores
Source	Rating
The Christian Beat	4.8/5
Jesus Freak Hideout	4/5 stars

Herb Longs of The Christian Beat described the album as "refreshing", writing that it features "expertly written lyrics with a variety of arrangements create massive anthems, personal prayers and everything in between" and "prominent musical and lyrical elements of renewal and revival". Writing for Jesus Freak Hideout, Josh Balogh stated that the album "might just be the most complete Hillsong Worship album in years. It has a crisply produced, cohesive approach, and enough diversity of worship leader and tone to go along with praiseworthy lyrics and contemporary musicality." Balogh ultimately called it "one of the best overall worship albums of the year". In a review for CBN, Kimberly Carr wrote that the album "leaves enough space throughout songs to inspire spontaneous worship" for listeners and worship teams.

In awarding the album the Worship Album of the Year, Kevin Davis of New Release Today, says that the album "is loaded with stellar vocals, catchy melodies and solid lyrics reflecting unashamed faith in Jesus" and "is loaded with several stirring new worship songs that really set me in the proper mindset to praise God for loving me so much that He gave His life away for all that was lost."

=== Accolades ===
Awards
Year	Organization	Award	Result	Ref
2020	GMA Dove Awards	Worship Album of the Year	Won	
2020	GMA Dove Awards	Long Form Video of the Year	Won	

Year-end lists
Publication	Accolade	Rank	Ref.
365 Days of Inspiring Media	Top 50 Albums of 2019	28	
NewReleaseToday	Top 10 Worship Albums of 2019	1	

== Track listing ==
No.	Title	Writer(s)	Worship leader(s)	Length
1.	"Dawn"	Brooke Ligertwood		1:31
2.	"Awake My Soul"	B. Ligertwood	B. Ligertwood	4:24
3.	"Come Alive"	Michael Fatkin; Benjamin Hastings; Scott Ligertwood	Hastings	4:32
4.	"See the Light"	Ben Fielding; Reuben Morgan	David Ware	4:07
5.	"No One but You"	S. Ligertwood; Aodhan King; B. Ligertwood	King; B. Ligertwood	8:55
6.	"King of Kings"	Jason Ingram; B. Ligertwood; S. Ligertwood	B. Ligertwood	4:25
7.	"I Will Praise You"	Joel Houston; Fielding; Dylan Thomas; Matt Crocker	Ben Fielding	5:50
8.	"From Whom All Blessings Flow (Doxology)"	Chris Davenport; B. Ligertwood; S. Ligertwood	Jad Gillies	4:48
9.	"Every Breath"	Hannah Hobbs; Ben Tan	Hobbs	4:51
10.	"Bright as the Sun"	Houston	Houston; B. Ligertwood	6:18
11.	"Upper Room"	Hastings; Houston	Taya Gaukrodger	4:00
12.	"He Shall Reign"	Fielding; Morgan	Morgan	6:37
13.	"See the Light" (live)	Fielding; Morgan	Ware; B. Ligertwood	4:10
14.	"King of Kings" (live)	Ingram; B. Ligertwood; S. Ligertwood	B. Ligertwood	4:51
15.	"No One but You" (live)	S. Ligertwood; King; B. Ligertwood	King; B. Ligertwood	8:42
Total length:				78:01

== Charts ==
=== Weekly charts ===
Weekly chart performance for Awake
Chart (2019)	Peak position
Australian Albums (ARIA)	3
Canadian Albums (Billboard)	95
Dutch Albums (Album Top 100)	62
New Zealand Albums (RMNZ)	19
Scottish Albums (OCC)	81
Swiss Albums (Schweizer Hitparade)	30
UK Christian & Gospel Albums (OCC)	2
US Billboard 200	39
US Christian Albums (Billboard)	1

=== Year-end charts ===
Year-end chart performance for Awake
Chart (2020)	Position
US Christian Albums (Billboard)	19
