= Albertine (song) =

Single by Brooke Fraser

from the album Albertine
- B-side: "C.S. Lewis Song" (live); "Faithful" (demo)
- Released: 9 July 2007
- Recorded: Track Record, North Hollywood, CA. 2006
- Genre: Pop
- Length: 3:57
- Label: Sony BMG
- Songwriter: Brooke Fraser
- Producer: Marshall Altman

Brooke Fraser singles chronology
"Shadowfeet" (2007)	"Albertine" (2007)	"Something in the Water" (2010)

"Albertine" is a song by singer-songwriter Brooke Fraser, and the third single from her second studio album, Albertine. It was largely inspired by a Rwandan orphan, by the name of Albertine, whom Fraser met while there in 2005.

"Albertine" did not appear on any record chart, but it won Fraser the annual APRA Silver Scroll.

== Background and release ==
Fraser went to Rwanda on behalf of World Vision in 2005, the first of many trips. While there, she met a girl named Albertine, who had become orphaned by the genocide of 1994. Fraser described Albertine as "tall and beautiful". Her guide, Joel, took her to a village school in Kabuga district, and showed her a girl whose life the guide had personally saved. On her return, she felt she was "in a position where I could share [a] message with other people [and as a musician] that could be a great way to contribute in and of itself". "Albertine" tells the "tale of courage" of the two Rwandans in the 1990s.

"Albertine" was released by Sony BMG on 9 July 2007 as a digital EP, as well as a CD single.

== Musical and lyrical composition ==
"Albertine"
The beginning of the chorus of the song, where Fraser describes her feelings of responsibility

"Albertine" is a guitar-based pop ballad. Mike Schiller from PopMatters said that "its rhythmic, largely amelodic guitar work stands in sharp contrast to the lush, almost cloying melodic sensibilities of the rest of the album."

The lyrics of "Albertine" describe Fraser's feelings while visiting Rwanda, and her responsibility to help the Rwandan people. Chris Thomas from suite101.com described it as "a tale of one less fortunate than herself; one who needs the love, care and support of those who are more fortunate". Another reviewer said that "On its surface, 'Albertine' is a song about a tall and beautiful girl who survived the Rwandan genocide. Really, though, it’s a song about a whole lot more. Really, it’s a song about faith, it’s a song about hope, it’s a song about love… and it’s a song about deeds.

== Reception ==
The Southern Cross selected "Albertine" as one of the standout songs from Fraser's album.

"Albertine" did not appear on any official record chart, and was the first of Fraser's singles that did not chart on the New Zealand Singles Chart. It did, however, win Fraser the 2007 APRA Silver Scroll, a peer-chosen award for songwriters. Other contenders for the Silver Scroll in 2007 included "Maybe" by Opshop, "Light Surrounding You" by Evermore, Crazy? Yes! Dumb? No! by The Mint Chicks, and Fraser's "Deciphering Me", also released from Albertine.

Fraser performed "Albertine" at the 2007 New Zealand Music Awards, where her album won the Highest Selling Album award, and "Deciphering Me" won Airplay Record of the Year.

== Music video ==
Brooke Fraser in the music video for Albertine

The music video for Albertine was shot in May 2007 in Rwanda. Fraser posted a blog entry in her official MySpace blog while en route to Rwanda from Johannesburg. In this entry, she stated:

I'm en route to Rwanda, ready to be ruined afresh and hopefully be a blessing to the people there amidst the "work" element of the trip... shooting some footage for a special thing I can reveal at a later date...

Later, on 15 July the video for the song was released on Brooke Fraser's official YouTube channel. It shows mostly face shots at the start of the video interspersed with pictures of children from Rwanda, before finally showing Fraser walk along a bridge as Rwandan people walk by.

== Track listing ==
All songs written by Brooke Fraser.

Albertine – EP

1. "Albertine – 3:57
2. "C.S. Lewis Song" (live) – 5:12
3. "Faithful" (demo) – 7;49
