= Nineveh (song) =

2022 song by Brooke Ligertwood

Promotional single by Brooke Ligertwood

from the album Seven
- Released: 4 February 2022
- Recorded: 11 November 2021
- Venue: The Belonging Co, Nashville, Tennessee, US
- Genre: Contemporary worship music
- Length: 5:09
- Label: Sparrow; Capitol CMG
- Songwriter(s): Brooke Ligertwood; Steven Furtick
- Producer(s): Brooke Ligertwood; Jason Ingram

Music videos
- "Nineveh" (Live) on YouTube
- "Nineveh" (Lyrics) on YouTube

"Nineveh" is a song by New Zealand singer-songwriter Brooke Ligertwood. It was released as the first and only promotional single from her first live album, Seven (2022), on 4 February 2022. Brooke Ligertwood co-wrote the song with Steven Furtick. The single was produced by Brooke Ligertwood and Jason Ingram.

== Background ==
"Nineveh" was released on 4 February 2022, accompanied with its live music video. "Nineveh" follows the release of "A Thousand Hallelujahs" which was the first single from her live album, Seven (2022). Ligertwood shared the story behind the song, saying that Steven Furtick reached out to her in the spring of 2021 with the idea of writing a song called "Nineveh." Ligertwood opined about the songwriting process for the song, saying:

It is a rare and deep joy to be able to write a song that closely examines a narrative of scripture while simultaneously inviting the listener to allow the scripture to examine them. "Nineveh" is one such rarity and I feel honoured to have co-written it with a songwriter and thinker I immensely respect – it was a joy from beginning to end.

== Composition ==
"Nineveh" is composed in the key of C with a tempo of 67.5 beats per minute and a musical time signature of 4/4.

== Music videos ==
On 4 February 2022, Brooke Ligertwood released the live performance video of "Nineveh" via YouTube. The live performance video was recorded on 11 November 2021, at The Belonging Co, a church in Nashville, Tennessee. Ligertwood published the lyric video of the song via YouTube on 13 February 2022.

== Personnel ==
Adapted from AllMusic.

- Jonathan Baines — vocals
- Lorenzo Baylor — vocals
- Natalie Brown — vocals
- Jonathan Buffum — engineer
- Cassie Campbell — bass
- Angelique Carter — vocals
- Tamar Chipp — vocals
- David Dennis — vocals
- Emily Douglas — vocals
- Jackson Dreyer — vocals
- Katelyn Drye — vocals
- E. Edwards — guitar
- Enaka Enyong — vocals
- David Funk — keyboards, programmer
- Sarah Gerald — vocals
- Sam Gibson — mixing
- Olivia Grasso — vocals
- Cecily Hennigan — vocals
- Jason Ingram — engineer, producer, programmer
- Nicole Johnson — vocals
- Benji Kurokose — vocals
- Shantrice Laura — vocals
- Drew Lavyne — mastering engineer
- Jenna Lee — vocals
- Jonathan Lee — guitar
- Brooke Ligertwood — guitar, keyboards, primary artist, producer, vocals
- Allison Marin — strings
- Antonio Marin — strings
- Daniella Mason — choir arrangement
- Daniel McMurray — drums
- Jonathan Mix — engineer
- Noah Moreno — vocals
- Brecken Myers — vocals
- Angela Nasby — vocals
- Jordyn Pierce — vocals
- Marci Pruzina — vocals
- Christine Rhee — vocals
- Emily Ruff — vocals
- Rylee Scott — vocals
- Zack Smith — vocals
- Cheryl Stark — vocals
- Keithon Stribling — vocals
- Dylan Thomas — guitar
- Bobby Valderrama — vocals
- Bria Valderrama — vocals
- Robby Valderrama — vocals
- John Wilds — vocals
- Mitch Wong — vocals
- Steph Wong — vocals

== Charts ==
Chart performance for "Nineveh"
Chart (2022)	Peak position
New Zealand Hot NZ Singles (RMNZ)	9

== Release history ==
Release dates and formats for "Nineveh"
Region	Date	Format	Label	Ref.
Various	January 14, 2022	Digital download; streaming; (promotional release)	Sparrow; Capitol CMG	
