= Albertine (album) =

Studio album by Brooke Fraser
- Released: 4 December 2006
- Recorded: 2005–2006
- Studios: Track Record (North Hollywood, California): The Galt Line (Burbank, California); ZUSS California (Studio City, California)
- Genres: Pop, folk
- Length: 45:26
- Label: Columbia
- Producer: Marshall Altman

Brooke Fraser chronology
What to Do with Daylight (2004)	Albertine (2006)	Flags (2010)

Deluxe Edition cover

Singles from Albertine
- 1. "Deciphering Me" Released: 15 November 2006; 2. "Shadowfeet" Released: 13 March 2007; 3. "Albertine" Released: 10 July 2007

Albertine is the second album by New Zealand singer-songwriter, Brooke Fraser. It was released in New Zealand and in the Oceanic region's iTunes Store on 4 December 2006. The album was released in Australia on 31 March 2007, where it peaked at No. 29. The album's lead single is "Deciphering Me". The follow-up single is "Shadowfeet" – a piano-driven ballad released in January 2007. Albertine became Fraser’s second album to reach No. 1, making her only the second New Zealand artist in history to have back-to-back album releases debut at the top of the New Zealand album charts. The first was Blindspott, whose album End the Silence achieved the same earlier that year.

A deluxe edition was released on 10 December; a year after the original release. The deluxe version features a bonus CD of eight live recordings (including a cover of Simon & Garfunkel's "The Sounds of Silence"), an entirely new booklet and double gatefold digipack packaging. "C.S. Lewis Song" was released as a promotional single to promote this re-release.

Albertine was also Brooke's US debut, released 27 May 2008 and entered the Billboard 200 at No. 90 on 19 July 2008.

Albertine was also picked as an "Editor's Music Choice" on iTunes USA which helped propel the album into the Top 10.

== Background ==
In 2005, Fraser travelled to Rwanda for World Vision. There she met Albertine, a Rwandan girl orphaned by the 1994 genocide. Fraser described the girl as "tall and beautiful".

== Reception ==
=== Critical reception ===
Professional ratings
Review scores
Source	Rating
Allmusic	3.5/5 stars
Christian Broadcasting Network	3/5 stars
Christianity Today	4.5/5 stars
Cross Rhythms	10/10 stars
Glide Magazine	5/5 stars
Jesus Freak Hideout	5/5 stars
Melodic.net	3.5/5 stars
New Release Tuesday	4.5/5 stars
PopMatters	6/10
Soul Shine Magazine	4.5/5 stars

Albertine garnered critical acclaim from ten music critics ratings. Greg Prato from Allmusic said that "there's nothing all that musically groundbreaking that would make Albertine stick out from the rest of the pack. That said, as her first [United States] release, Albertine does indeed show great promise". Andree Farias from Christianity Today said that "Albertine proves it is possible to strike the perfect balance between art and faith, while still remaining accessible to both sides of the Christian-mainstream divide." Jesus Freak Hideout's David Goodman described Albertine as "one of the most brilliantly expressive and musically well-crafted albums of its kind." Mike Schiller from PopMatters stated that "[Fraser's] songs do have a tendency to blur [the boundary between church and popular art] together, with the occasional beautiful, touching piece that grabs hold of all of the right nerves and doesn't let go". The Southern Cross identified Albertine as "the kind of album that after repeated listening quietly creeps up on the listener with its hypnotic beauty, sense of peace and genuine soul."

Mike Rimmer of Cross Rhythms called this an "excellent album". Kevin Davis of New Release Tuesday described this as being "almost perfect and is worthy of award consideration, and she is my choice for best new artist 2008." Lindsay Whitfield of Soul Shine Magazine felt that "Fraser's style is poetic and serene, it dives deep in discovery and isn't afraid to be honest; this is an album to relish and it will provide revelations that will soak into your soul and inspire you to live with a heart of justice, compassion, and humility." Tom Spinelli of Melodic.net affirmed that "Fraser's voice is the main reason behind the true decadence of the album." Kimberly A. Lilly of Christian Broadcasting Network highlighted that "The New Zealand native sings with so much depth in her lyrics that it is easy to write the album off as boring on the first listen." Also, Lilly wrote that the "sound is different in a good way and is a good pick for those who are tired of the norm." Jason Gonulsen of Glide Magazine stated that " Fraser's writing is mature, her voice sweet and confident, and her songs serve a purpose, most notably the engaging title track, which tells of her experiences in Rwanda and her relationship with a girl named Albertine. The twelve songs on Albertine play like a beautifully composed pop masterpiece surrounded with talented musicians, with a confident, now 24-year-old Fraser always in the lead."

=== Commercial performance ===
Albertine debuted on the New Zealand Albums Chart on 11 December 2006 at number one. The album was certified Platinum in its first week, selling over 15,000 copies. It remained in the top ten for twenty non-consecutive weeks, seventeen of those being in the top five. The album was certified four times platinum, with sales of over 60,000 copies.

Albertine was released in Australia on 31 March 2007, and on 9 April 2007 it entered the Australian Albums Chart at number twenty nine. The album spent just five weeks on the chart. It was certified gold, selling over 35,000 copies.

In the United States, Albertine made its debut on the Billboard 200 at number ninety on the week ending 19 June 2008.This was Fraser's first appearance on the U.S Charts. The album also peaked at number three on Billboard's Christian Albums chart, number nine on the Independent Albums chart, two-hundred-and-eighteen on the Digital Albums chart, and number four on the Top Christian & Gospel Albums Chart.

==== Charts ====
Chart (2006–2008)	Peak position
New Zealand Albums Chart	1
Australian Albums Chart	29
US Billboard 200	90
US Christian Albums	3
US Digital Albums	90
US Independent Albums	9
US Top Christian & Gospel Albums	3

==== Certifications ====
Country	Certification	Sales
Australia	Gold	35,000+
Canada	Gold	60,000
New Zealand	4× Platinum	60,000+
United States	—	16,000+

== Track listing ==
No.	Title	Writer(s)	Length
1.	"Shadowfeet"	Brooke Fraser	3:37
2.	"Deciphering Me"	Fraser	4:17
3.	"Love, Where Is Your Fire?"	Fraser	4:20
4.	"Love Is Waiting"	Fraser	4:31
5.	"Albertine"	Fraser	3:55
6.	"C.S. Lewis Song"	Fraser	4:38
7.	"Epilogue"	Fraser	1:13
8.	"Faithful"	Fraser	4:18
9.	"Seeds"	Dave Bassett, Fraser	3:56
10.	"Hosea's Wife"	Fraser	4:06
11.	"The Thief"	Fraser, Dan Wilson	3:21
12.	"Hymn"	Fraser	3:14

Digital-only tracks
No.	Title	Length
13.	"Faithful" (Demo version)	4:00
14.	"Hosea's Wife" (Demo version)	4:09

Deluxe Edition (Disc Two)
No.	Title	Writer(s)	Length
1.	"C.S. Lewis Song" (live)	Fraser	6:42
2.	"Better" (live)	Fraser	4:26
3.	"Seeds" (live)	Bassett, Fraser	3:46
4.	"The Sound of Silence" (live)	Paul Simon	5:29
5.	"Hymn" (live)	Fraser	3:19
6.	"Love, Where Is Your Fire?" (live)	Fraser	4:23
7.	"Arithmetic" (live)	Fraser	4:38
8.	"Hosea's Wife" (live)	Fraser	5:24

== Personnel ==
- Brooke Fraser – vocals, acoustic piano, acoustic guitar, string arrangements
- Kristopher Pooley – additional acoustic piano, Fender Rhodes piano, Wurlitzer electric piano, organ, synthesizers, glockenspiel
- David Levita – Sonica synthesizer, electric guitars, mando-guitar, marxophone
- Michael Chaves – electric guitars
- Sean Hurley – bass guitar
- Aaron Sterling – drums, percussion
- Marshall Altman – percussion, backing vocals, string arrangements
- Joe Zook – percussion
- Stevie Blacke – strings, string arrangements

=== Production ===
- Malcolm Black – A&R
- Marshall Altman – producer, recording
- Joe Zook – recording, mixing
- Andy Hayes – assistant engineer
- Bob Ludwig – mastering at Gateway Mastering (Portland, Maine)
- Debaser – artwork, design
- Sophie Howarth – photography
- Kristopher Pooley – band photography
- Scott Ligertwood – Rwanda photography
- Jerry Hammond with Wood & Bone Label Management – management
- CRS Management – management

Source: CD Universe, Artistdirect

== Release history ==
Standard Edition

Country	Date	Label
New Zealand	5 December 2006	Sony BMG
Australia	31 March 2007	Sony BMG
United States	27 May 2008	Wood & Bone

Deluxe Edition

Country	Date	Label
New Zealand	4 December 2007	Sony BMG
Australia	25 November 2008	Sony BMG
