= Betty (Brooke Fraser song) =

Single by Brooke Fraser

from the album Flags
- Released: 6 December 2010
- Genre: Pop rock
- Length: 2:58
- Label: Sony Music Entertainment
- Songwriters: Brooke Fraser, Jon Foreman, Ben West
- Producer: Brooke Fraser

Brooke Fraser singles chronology
"Something in the Water" (2010)	"Betty" (2010)	"Kings & Queens" (2014)

"Betty" is a song by New Zealand recording artist, Brooke Fraser. Written by Fraser with Jon Foreman and Ben West, and produced by Fraser, the pop rock record centres on a girl who hides behind scars and birthmarks. The song was released on 6 December 2010 as the second single from Fraser's third studio album, Flags. "Betty" received generally positive reviews from critics, and has peaked at number thirty on the New Zealand Singles Chart. The accompanying music video takes place in a flower garden, and features lifelike paper birds.

== Background and composition ==
"Betty"
A sample of the song's first verse, featuring a snap rhythm

"Betty" was written by Brooke Fraser, Jon Foreman and Ben West, and, like the other tracks on Flags, Fraser produced the tune herself. The song draws from the genre of pop rock, and features a snap rhythm. "Betty" has a theme of isolation, and "tells the story of a lonely girl hiding behind 'scars and birthmarks'," including one shaped like Canada.

== Release and reception ==
"Betty" was released as a digital download on 6 December 2010 in New Zealand. Christianity Today's John Brandon noted "Betty" as one of the top tracks on Flags. Tom Cardy from The Dominion Post lauded its musical and lyrical depth, and Lindsay Whitfield of Soulshine praised its "catchy" rhythm.

"Betty" entered the New Zealand Singles Chart at number thirty-eight on 24 January 2011, and remained in the position the next week. The song would go on to peak at number thirty in its third charting week, remaining on the charts for 5 weeks total.

== Music video ==
The accompanying music video for "Betty" debuted on Nightline on 29 November 2010. The video takes place in an indoor flower garden. Fraser wears a strapless silver dress, black stockings and purple eye-shadow, with her hair tied in a bun. She dances among the garden, admiring the flowers. Origami birds are seen moving as though living amongst the flowers, and, in the chorus, surround Fraser. The video closes with Fraser observing a paper bird flying away.

== Track listing ==
Digital download

1. "Betty" – 2:58
2. "Betty" (instrumental) – 2:59
