= B-Sides and Rarities =

B-Sides and Rarities, or variants, may refer to:

- B Sides and Rarities (Andy Williams album) (2003)
- B-Sides and Rarities (Beach House album) (2017)
- B-Sides & Rarities (Boyzone album) (2008)
- B-Sides and Rarities (Cake album) (2007)
- B-Sides & Rarities (CKY album) (2011)
- B-Sides & Rarities (Deftones album) (2005)
- Rarities & B-sides (Delerium album) (2015)
- B-Sides & Rarities 1996–2003, by Eels (2005)
- B-Sides, Remixes and Rarities, by Grand National (2007)
- B-Sides & Rarities (Nick Cave and the Bad Seeds album) (2005)
- Rarities, B-Sides and Other Stuff, by Sarah McLachlan (1996)
- Rarities, B-Sides and Other Stuff Volume 2, by Sarah McLachlan (2008)
- B-Sides & Rarities (Seven Mary Three album) (1997)
- B-Sides & Rarities (The Format album) (2007)
- Rarities and B-Sides by The Smashing Pumpkins (2005)
- The Power of Negative Thinking: B-Sides & Rarities, by The Jesus and Mary Chain (2008)

== See also ==
- B-Sides (disambiguation)
- List of B-side compilation albums
