= Eat (album) =

Studio album by Brooke Ligertwood
- Released: 15 May 2026
- Genre: Worship
- Length: 39:00
- Label: Sparrow; Academy; Capitol CMG
- Producer: Brooke Ligertwood; Jason Ingram

Brooke Ligertwood chronology
Live with the Auckland Philharmonia (2025)	Eat (2026)

Eat is the sixth studio album by the New Zealand singer Brooke Ligertwood. The album was released on 15 May 2026, via Sparrow Records, Academy Records, and Capitol Christian Music Group, to CD, LP, digital download, and streaming formats. Its ten tracks were written by Ligertwood, and produced by her alongside Jason Ingram. The album features guest appearances from Lauren Daigle, The New Respects, Victory Boyd, Abbie Gamboa, and Ingram.

Eat was promoted with the release of three promotional singles, including "Even Death on a Cross!" on 18 February 2026, "The Water" on 20 March 2026, and "Though War Break Out Against Me" on 24 April 2026. "Even Death on a Cross!" peaked at number 11 on Recorded Music NZ's Hot Aotearoa Singles chart, while the album itself peaked at number 6 on RMNZ's Top Aotearoa Albums chart.

== Release and promotion ==
In February 2026, Ligertwood announced the release date for Eat, while the album was made available for pre-order. On 16 February 2026, Ligertwood announced to Instagram the forthcoming release date for "Even Death on a Cross!", a collaboration with Gamboa. The track was officially released on 18 February 2026. The track, a "piano-driving collaboration" was drawn from the Bible passage Philippians 2:8, which states that Christ "humbled himself in obedience to God, and died a criminal's death on a cross". The track was promoted with the release of a lyric video, which was uploaded to YouTube.

On 18 March 2026, the release date for an upcoming track, "The Water", was announced, The song was released on 20 March 2026. The track was promoted with the release of a lyric video, which was uploaded to YouTube. With its release, the tracklist for Eat was revealed. On 24 April 2026, the album's third and final promotional single, "Though War Break Out Against Me", was released. The track was promoted with the release of a lyric video, which was uploaded to YouTube. Eat was also supported with the release of teasers to social media.

== Lyrics and meaning ==
All of the album's lyrics are quotations from Bible passages; for instance, "Even Death on a Cross!" was based on Philippians 2:8, "The Water" was based on Jeremiah 17:7-8, and "Though War Break Out Against Me" was based on Psalm 27. The album is centered around themes of "hunger, nourishment, and daily reliance on God". It contains "scripture-shaped songwriting". It demonstrates the styles of contemporary worship music.

== Reception ==
Professional ratings
Review scores
Source	Rating
Jubilee Cast	2.75/5 stars

=== Critical ===
Writing for Jubilee Cast, Rison Zion rated the album 2.75-out-of-5, describing it as a "surprising disappointment". He praised the album as possibly being Ligertwood's "most ambitious album conceptually", although criticized for being "creatively undernourished"; he saw this as being primarily due to the album containing less "melodic hooks and congregational energy" than Ligertwood's prior work. In an alternate vein, Nathan Finochio, described the album in his review as "a work of art in its layout and intention. As far as Christian albums go, this one sits on the top shelf with Andrae Crouch's Take Me Back, Keith Green's So You Wanna Go Back To Egypt, and Delirious' Cutting Edge".

=== Commercial ===
Eat debuted at number 6 on the RMNZ Top Aotearoa Albums chart. Upon the album's release, four tracks entered the Hot Aotearoa Singles chart, with the highest entry being "Watchmen" at number 6. It was followed by "In the Land of the Living", "Lest I Sleep", and "Even Death on a Cross!", placing at numbers 9, 10, and 11, respectively. In the United States, "Watchmen" placed upon the Billboard Hot Christian Songs chart at number 50.

== Track listing ==
All tracks are written by Brooke Ligertwood.

Eat track listing
No.	Title	Length
1.	"Watchmen" (with Lauren Daigle and the New Respects)	2:47
2.	"The Water" (with Victory)	3:34
3.	"Even Death on a Cross!" (with Abby Gamboa)	4:09
4.	"Lest I Sleep"	4:00
5.	"Though War Break Out Against Me"	4:25
6.	"In the Land of the Living"	3:48
7.	"Participation"	3:14
8.	"Looking" (with Jason Ingram)	5:33
9.	"Because of the Lord's Great Love"	5:31
10.	"Nations"	2:44
Total length:		39:00

== Personnel ==
Credits are adapted from Tidal.

=== Musicians ===
- Brooke Ligertwood – vocals (all tracks), keyboards (tracks 3–6, 8, 9)
- Matt Stanfield – keyboards, programming
- Jason Ingram – programming (all tracks), vocals (8)
- Cassie Campbell – bass guitar
- E. Edwards – guitar
- Darius Fitzgerald – drums, percussion, vocals (1)
- Zandy Mowry – guitar, vocals (1)
- Jasmine Mullen – vocals (1)
- Lauren Daigle – vocals (1)
- Dylan Ligertwood – additional vocals (1)
- Rooney Ligertwood – additional vocals (1)
- Dan McMurray – drums (2–10)
- Jonathan Lee – pedal steel guitar (2)
- Victory Boyd – vocals (2)
- Joe Williams – programming (3–5, 8, 10)
- David McKenery – pipe organ (3–5)
- Abbie Gamboa – vocals (3)
- Allison Marin – strings (4, 5, 7–10)
- Antonio Marin – strings (4, 5, 7–10)
- Gabe Scott – hammered dulcimer (4)
- Jonathan Mix – horn (5, 10)
- Danielle Wood – background vocals (7, 8)
- Everett Wood – background vocals (7, 8)
- Georgia Lines – background vocals (7, 8)
- John Wilds – background vocals (7, 8)
- Kristian Stanfill – background vocals (7, 8)
- Lindsey Strand – background vocals (7, 8)
- Matt Crocker – background vocals (7, 8)
- Patrick Mayberry – background vocals (7, 8)
- Angela Nasby – choir vocals (10)
- Austin Powell – choir vocals (10)
- Bay Turner – choir vocals (10)
- Becca Gray – choir vocals (10)
- Enaka Enyong – choir vocals (10)
- Jonathan Baines – choir vocals (10)
- Jordyn Pierce – choir vocals (10)
- Katie Smith – choir vocals (10)
- Sophie Shear – choir vocals (10)

=== Technical ===
- Jason Ingram – production, engineering, recording, digital editing
- Brooke Ligertwood – production
- Darius Fitzgerald – additional production (1)
- Zandy Mowry – additional production (1)
- Matt Stanfield – engineering
- Joe Williams – engineering (3–5, 8, 10)
- Jonathan Mix – recording, digital editing
- David Funk – recording (3–5)
- Jonathan Buffum – digital editing
- Sam Gibson – mixing
- Drew Lavyne – mastering
- Jerrico Scroggins – vocal engineering (10)

== Charts ==
Weekly chart performance for Eat
Chart (2026)	Peak position
Aotearoa Albums (RMNZ)	6

== Release history ==
Release history and formats for Eat
Region	Date	Format(s)	Label(s)
Various	15 May 2026	CD; LP; digital download; streaming	Sparrow; Academy; Capitol CMG
