= Something in the Water (Brooke Fraser song) =

2010 single by Brooke Fraser

Single by Brooke Fraser

from the album Flags
- B-side: "Orphans, Kingdoms"
- Released: 2 August 2010
- Genre: Country pop
- Length: 3:01
- Label: Sony Music Entertainment; Wood + Bone
- Songwriters: Brooke Fraser; Scott Ligertwood
- Producer: Brooke Fraser

Brooke Fraser singles chronology
"Albertine" (2007)	"Something in the Water" (2010)	"Betty" (2010)

"Something in the Water" is the lead single from New Zealand singer-songwriter Brooke Fraser's third studio album, Flags (2010). It was released by Sony Music Entertainment in New Zealand on 2 August 2010 and subsequently became her first chart-topper, reaching number one on New Zealand's RIANZ Singles Chart in October. It was also her first international hit, reaching the top 10 in Austria, Germany, Luxembourg, and Switzerland.

== Background and reception ==
"Something in the Water"
The song was described as a country pop "little thigh-slapper"

Fraser told fans via Twitter that "['Something in the Water'] is a bit different to what you might be used to from me". Scott Kara from The New Zealand Herald called the song "a right little thigh-slapper, with a bit of a stomp to it, and it's about good times, drinking wine, and being in love." The Sunday Star-Times' Grant Smithies referred to it as "an unexpectedly perky country-pop ditty built around a rollicking bluegrass stomp." Both writers compared the song to the work of Dolly Parton.

In 2025, Something in the Water was named by Rolling Stone magazine as one of the best AUS/NZ songs of the 21st century so far (ranked 138th).

== Chart performance ==
"Something in the Water" debuted on the New Zealand Singles Chart of 9 August 2010 at number 10. On 18 October 2010 it peaked at number one, replacing Bruno Mars' "Just the Way You Are"; this was Fraser's first number-one single in her home country and eighth top 20 single overall, spending a total of 29 weeks on the chart. At the end of the year, the single made it to number 16 on the year-end chart. It also proved to be her breakout hit in Australia and Europe. The song debuted and peaked at number 29 on Australia's ARIA Singles Chart on 7 November 2010, spending six weeks in the top 50. In 2011, the song was released in Europe and became a major hit in German-speaking countries, reaching number eight in Germany and Luxembourg and number 10 in Austria and Switzerland. The song also charted in Belgium, France (in 2012), and the Netherlands. Although Fraser's prior single "Shadowfeet" did enter the US Christian Songs chart, "Something in the Water" did not continue Fraser's success in that country.

== Music video ==
According to Fraser via Facebook, the video for "Something in the Water" was shot in August. Directed by Joe Kefali and Campbell Hooper, it was released onto YouTube on 31 August 2010. The video contains both live action and animated scenes. The live action portions portray Fraser in a room with a copy of the Homer epic Odyssey, and the animated portions pay homage to the epic.

== Track listings ==
CD single

1. "Something in the Water" – 3:04
2. "Orphans, Kingdoms" – 3:55

Digital EP

1. "Something in the Water" – 3:04
2. "Orphans, Kingdoms" – 3:54
3. "Coachella" (Extended Version) – 4:32

== Charts ==
=== Weekly charts ===
Weekly chart performance for "Something in the Water"
Chart (2010–2012)	Peak position
Australia (ARIA)	29
Austria (Ö3 Austria Top 40)	10
France (SNEP)	56
Germany (GfK)	8
Hungary (Editors' Choice Top 40)	34
Italy (FIMI)	19
Luxembourg Digital Songs (Billboard)	8
Netherlands (Dutch Top 40)	22
Netherlands (Single Top 100)	25
New Zealand (Recorded Music NZ)	1
Switzerland (Schweizer Hitparade)	10
UK Singles (Official Charts)	193

=== Year-end charts ===
2010 year-end chart performance for "Something in the Water"
Chart (2010)	Position
New Zealand (RIANZ)	16

2011 year-end chart performance for "Something in the Water"
Chart (2011)	Position
Austria (Ö3 Austria Top 40)	54
Germany (Media Control GfK)	31
Italy (Musica e dischi)	99
Netherlands (Dutch Top 40)	87
Switzerland (Schweizer Hitparade)	68

== Certifications ==
Certifications and sales for "Something in the Water"
Region	Certification	Certified units/sales
Australia (ARIA)	Gold	35,000^{^}
Austria (IFPI Austria)	Gold	15,000^{*}
Germany (BVMI)	Gold	150,000^{^}
Italy (FIMI)	Gold	15,000^{*}
New Zealand (RMNZ)	2× Platinum	30,000^{*}
Switzerland (IFPI Switzerland)	Gold	15,000^{^}
^{*} Sales figures based on certification alone.^{^} Shipments figures based on certification alone.

== Release history ==
Release dates and formats for "Something in the Water"
Region	Release date	Format	Label
Australia	2 August 2010	Digital download	Sony Music Entertainment
New Zealand	2 August 2010	Digital download	Sony Music Entertainment
Austria	3 August 2010	Digital download	Wood & Bone
Denmark	3 August 2010	Digital download	Wood & Bone
Italy	3 August 2010	Digital download	Wood & Bone
Japan	3 August 2010	Digital download	Wood & Bone
Mexico	3 August 2010	Digital download	Wood & Bone
Netherlands	3 August 2010	Digital download	Wood & Bone
Spain	3 August 2010	Digital download	Wood & Bone
Switzerland	3 August 2010	Digital download	Wood & Bone
United Kingdom	3 August 2010	Digital download	Wood & Bone
United States	24 August 2010	Digital download	Wood & Bone
Germany	20 May 2011	CD single	Warner Music Group
Germany	20 May 2011	Digital EP	Warner Music Group

== See also ==
- List of number-one singles in 2010 (New Zealand)
