= A Thousand Hallelujahs =

2022 single by Brooke Ligertwood

Single by Brooke Ligertwood

from the album Seven
- Released: 14 January 2022
- Recorded: 11 November 2021
- Venue: The Belonging Co, Nashville, Tennessee, US
- Genre: Contemporary worship music
- Length: 5:09
- Label: Sparrow; Capitol CMG
- Songwriter(s): Brooke Ligertwood; Phil Wickham; Scott Ligertwood
- Producer(s): Brooke Ligertwood; Jason Ingram

Brooke Ligertwood singles chronology
"Therapy" (2016)	"A Thousand Hallelujahs" (2022)	"Honey in the Rock" (2022)

Alternative cover
- EP cover

Music videos
- "A Thousand Hallelujahs" (Acoustic) on YouTube
- "A Thousand Hallelujahs" (Live) on YouTube
- "A Thousand Hallelujahs" (Lyrics) on YouTube

"A Thousand Hallelujahs" is a song by New Zealand singer-songwriter Brooke Ligertwood. It was released as the lead single from her first live album, Seven (2022), on 14 January 2022. Brooke Ligertwood co-wrote the song with Phil Wickham and Scott Ligertwood. The single was produced by Brooke Ligertwood and Jason Ingram.

"A Thousand Hallelujahs" peaked at number 44 on the US Hot Christian Songs chart.

== Background ==
Brooke Ligertwood announced that she would releasing "A Thousand Hallelujahs" as the first single from her live album, Seven (2022), on 14 January 2022. A Thousand Hallelujahs" was released on 14 January 2022, accompanied with its live music video. Ligertwood shared the story behind the song, saying:

My husband and I went down to our friend, Phil Wickham, who lives just about an hour down the road from us. And we were writing in the church that Phil goes to, which is like this old little church hall in Southern California. We were sitting in the church hall with the keyboards and the guitars, and there's just this beautiful, empty hall, and kind of started talking about all the generations of people who had worshiped in this church. We were just were so inspired by the generational nature of the Church of Jesus. And we started talking about the thousands of hallelujahs that had been sung in that room.

== Composition ==
"A Thousand Hallelujahs" is composed in the key of D♭ with a tempo of 68 beats per minute and a musical time signature of 4/4.

== Reception ==
=== Critical response ===
Reviewing for 365 Days of Inspiring Media, Jonathan Andre gave a positive review of the song, saying "A passionate declaration of our allegiance to Christ, it's a perfect representation of a 'modern hymn', a worship song for the church that has become a joy to listen to (and sing along with)." Gerod Bass of Worship Musician magazine wrote in his review: "Congregationally friendly and vertically focused, this tune will be sung in churches all over the world and your church should definitely add this one to your Sunday setlist." Timothy Yap of JubileeCast described the song as having "a congregational affinity", concluding that "Featuring a memorable chorus with a melody that invites you to worship, "A Thousand Hallelujahs" ranks high up there with Hillsong's classics such as "What a Beautiful Name" and "Who You Say I Am.""

=== Accolades ===
Year-end lists
Publication	Accolade	Rank	Ref.
JubileeCast	Best Christian Songs of 2022	7	

== Commercial performance ==
"A Thousand Hallelujahs" debuted at number 44 on the US Hot Christian Songs chart dated 29 January 2022, concurrently charting at number six on the Christian Digital Song Sales chart.

== Music videos ==
On 14 January 2022, Brooke Ligertwood released the live performance video of "A Thousand Hallelujahs" via YouTube. The live performance video was recorded on 11 November 2021, at The Belonging Co, a church in Nashville, Tennessee. Ligertwood published the lyric video of the song via YouTube on 20 January 2022. The official acoustic performance video of the song was availed on 28 January 2022, through YouTube.

== Track listing ==
"A Thousand Hallelujahs"
No.	Title	Writer(s)	Producer(s)	Length
1.	"A Thousand Hallelujahs"	Brooke Ligertwood; Phil Wickham; Scott Ligertwood	Brooke Ligertwood; Jason Ingram	5:09

"A Thousand Hallelujahs" — Apple Music bonus video content
No.	Title	Length
2.	"A Thousand Hallelujahs" (Live in Nashville, TN/2021)	5:11
Total length:		10:20

"A Thousand Hallelujahs" — EP
No.	Title	Length
1.	"A Thousand Hallelujahs" (Radio Version)	3:42
2.	"A Thousand Hallelujahs" (Live)	5:09
3.	"A Thousand Hallelujahs" (with Passion; Live from Passion 2022)	5:10
4.	"A Thousand Hallelujahs" (Acoustic)	5:10
5.	"A Thousand Hallelujahs" (Live in Nashville, TN/2021; Music video)	5:11
Total length:		24:23

== Personnel ==
Adapted from AllMusic.

- Jonathan Baines — vocals
- Lorenzo Baylor — vocals
- Natalie Brown — vocals
- Jonathan Buffum — engineer
- Cassie Campbell — bass
- Angelique Carter — vocals
- Tamar Chipp — vocals
- David Dennis — vocals
- Emily Douglas — vocals
- Jackson Dreyer — vocals
- Katelyn Drye — vocals
- E. Edwards — guitar
- Enaka Enyong — vocals
- David Funk — keyboards, programmer
- Sarah Gerald — vocals
- Sam Gibson — mixing
- Olivia Grasso — vocals
- Cecily Hennigan — vocals
- Jason Ingram — engineer, producer, programmer
- Nicole Johnson — vocals
- Benji Kurokose — vocals
- Shantrice Laura — vocals
- Drew Lavyne — mastering engineer
- Jenna Lee — vocals
- Jonathan Lee — guitar
- Brooke Ligertwood — guitar, keyboards, primary artist, producer, vocals
- Allison Marin — strings
- Antonio Marin — strings
- Daniella Mason — choir arrangement
- Daniel McMurray — drums
- Jonathan Mix — engineer
- Noah Moreno — vocals
- Brecken Myers — vocals
- Angela Nasby — vocals
- Jordyn Pierce — vocals
- Marci Pruzina — vocals
- Christine Rhee — vocals
- Emily Ruff — vocals
- Rylee Scott — vocals
- Zack Smith — vocals
- Cheryl Stark — vocals
- Keithon Stribling — vocals
- Dylan Thomas — guitar
- Bobby Valderrama — vocals
- Bria Valderrama — vocals
- Robby Valderrama — vocals
- John Wilds — vocals
- Mitch Wong — vocals
- Steph Wong — vocals

== Charts ==
Chart performance for "A Thousand Hallelujahs"
Chart (2022)	Peak position
New Zealand Hot NZ Singles (RMNZ)	8
US Christian Songs (Billboard)	44
US Christian Airplay (Billboard)	33

== Release history ==
Release dates and formats for "A Thousand Hallelujahs"
Region	Date	Version	Format	Label	Ref.
Various	14 January 2022	Live	Digital download; streaming	Sparrow; Capitol CMG	
Various	10 February 2023	EP	Digital download; streaming	Sparrow; Capitol CMG	
United States	10 February 2023	Radio	Christian radio	Sparrow; Capitol CMG	

== Other versions ==
- Passion released a version of the song featuring Brooke Ligertwood on their live album, Burn Bright (2022).
