= B-Sides =

B-Sides or B-Side may refer to:

== Music ==
- B-side, the second side of a record or cassette
- The B-Sides (composition), a 2009 symphony by Mason Bates
- The B-Sides (band), a 2000s American rock group
- "B Side", a song by San Cisco, 2016
- "B-Side", a song by Khruangbin and Leon Bridges, 2022

=== Albums ===
- B-Side (album), by Mr. Children, 2007
- B-Sides (Avril Lavigne album), 2001
- B-Sides (Danko Jones album), 2009
- B-Sides (The Enemy album), 2008
- B-Sides (Helix album), 1999
- B-Sides (Slade album), 2007
- The B-Sides (The Gaslight Anthem album), 2014
- B Sides, by Brooke Fraser, 2018
- B-Sides, by Tom Rosenthal, 2013
- B-Sides: 1996–2006, by Placebo, 2011
- MSI B-Sides vol. 1 by Mindless Self Indulgence, 2024

=== EPs ===
- B-Side (EP), by Baiyu, or the title song, 2010
- B-Sides (Damien Rice EP), 2004
- B-Sides (Pin-Up Went Down EP), 2012
- B-Sides (Smile Empty Soul EP), 2007
- The B-Sides (EP), by Adam and the Ants, 1982
- The B-Sides/The Conversation, by the Afghan Whigs, 1994
- B-Sides, by G-Eazy, 2019
- The B-Sides, 2011–2014, by Jon Pardi, 2015

== Film and television ==
- The B-Side: Elsa Dorfman's Portrait Photography, a 2016 documentary film by Errol Morris
- "B Sides" (Cloak & Dagger), a 2019 television episode

== Other uses ==
- Security BSides, a global series of information security conferences
- Side B Christians
- Side B/Weird Route, the alternate hidden route in Deltarune, a video game by Toby Fox.

== See also ==
- B-Sides and Rarities (disambiguation)
- List of B-side compilation albums
- Side B (EP), by Christina Grimmmie, 2017
- B-Sides The Beatles, an album by the Smithereens, 2008
