= Bless God =

2024 song by Brooke Ligertwood

"Bless God" is a single by New Zealand singer, worship leader and songwriter Brooke Ligertwood from her studio album Eight. It was released on 5 April 2024 as an EP consisting of four versions of the song, including a live version from Passion 2024 with Brandon Lake and Cody Carnes. Ligertwood co-wrote the song with both Lake and Carnes.

== Background ==
Ligertwood announced that Bless God would be released as a single on 5 April 2024 and as an EP.

Ligertwood wrote the song with Cody Carnes and Brandon Lake. "'Bless God' is a gift to me, I don't know how I got to be in the room when that song happened. Cody already had the chorus, and then this verse came out, and then this bridge. And I wonder if just by the mercy of God, I got to be there and part of that song that day because that was the song that I needed."

== Commercial performance ==
"Bless God" peaked at number 23 on the US Hot Christian Songs chart dated 27 April 2024.

The song didn't reach Official Top 40 on The Official NZ Music Charts but peaked number 8 on Hot 20 NZ Singles Chart dated 30 October 2023
