= Without You (Brooke Fraser song) =

Single by Brooke Fraser

from the album What to Do with Daylight
- Released: 17 January 2005
- Recorded: 2003
- Genre: Pop
- Label: Sony BMG
- Songwriter(s): Brooke Fraser

Brooke Fraser singles chronology
"Arithmetic" (2004)	"Without You" (2005)	"Deciphering Me" (2006)

"Without You" is a single by Brooke Fraser released in 2005. The song debuted and peaked on the New Zealand Singles chart at number sixteen on 24 January 2005 and spent just nine weeks on the chart.

== Track listing ==
1. "Without You" (Album version)
2. "Honest"
3. "Woodstock"

== Charts ==
Chart (2005)	Peak position
New Zealand Singles Chart	16
