= Shadowfeet =

Single by Brooke Fraser

from the album Albertine
- Released: 13 March 2007
- Recorded: Track Record, North Hollywood, CA. 2006
- Genre: Pop rock
- Length: 3:37 (Album Version); 3:19 (Video Version)
- Label: Columbia
- Songwriter(s): Brooke Fraser
- Producer(s): Marshall Altman

Brooke Fraser singles chronology
"Deciphering Me" (2006)	"Shadowfeet" (2007)	"Albertine" (2007)

"Shadowfeet" is a song by pop singer–songwriter Brooke Fraser from her second studio album, Albertine. It was released as the album's second single in early 2007.

The song was announced as Fraser's second single to be released in Australia in August to coincide with her Australian tour. The song was the first single that she released in the United States. The song was peaked as the 9th most played Christian Hit Radio song in the United States on R&R magazine's 6 September 2008 chart. The song was used in promotional commercials for the Nine Network's series Sea Patrol.

== Music video ==
The video for "Shadowfeet" was directed by TWiN and shot in Sydney in mid-December 2006. It begins with Fraser standing on a street holding a camera. As she sings her way through the first verse, another person replaces Fraser in the shot as the chorus is reached. This replacement repeats many times throughout the video, with many people of various cultures singing the song. Initially, the camera mainly concentrates on the individual's face, but during the second verse it drifts slowly down Fraser's body and then gives a side-view angle and stays that way until the bridge. The video ends with Fraser taking a portrait photograph looking in towards the camera and then turning away. The entire video was shot using a single T1 50mm lens, the same lens around Fraser's neck.

The song is shortened for the video version, only including the second chorus at the end of the song rather than the first and second, as in the album version.

== Track listing ==
#	Title	Writer(s)	Duration
1.	"Shadowfeet"	Fraser, Brooke	3:37
2.	"Shadowfeet (Video)"	Fraser, Brooke	3:18
3.	"Deciphering Me (Video)"	Fraser, Brooke	4:27

== Charts ==
The song debuted on the New Zealand Singles Chart at number thirty nine on 12 March 2007, jumping to number 22 the following week. It peaked at number thirteen and spent seventeen weeks on the chart

In the US, "Shadowfeet" debuted on the U.S. Hot Christian Songs Chart at number twenty-nine on the chart week of 9 August 2008. It peaked at number thirteen and spent twenty one weeks on the chart. The same week it also debuted on the Hot Christian Adult Contemporary Chart at number twenty eight. It peaked at number seventeen and spent twenty weeks on the chart.

Chart (2007)	Peak position
New Zealand (Recorded Music NZ)	13
Chart (2008)	Peak position
U.S Hot Christian Songs (Billboard)	13
U.S Hot Christian Adult Contemporary Chart (Billboard)	17

== Certifications ==
Certifications for "Shadowfeet"
Region	Certification	Certified units/sales
New Zealand (RMNZ)	Gold	15,000^{‡}
^{‡} Sales+streaming figures based on certification alone.
