= Suite101 =

Suite101.com Media Inc.
- Type: Publishing
- Industry: Internet
- Headquarters: Vancouver, British Columbia, Canada
- Products: information
- Website: suite101.com

Suite101 was a collaborative publishing site based in Vancouver, British Columbia, Canada. It formerly generated revenue from advertisements and shared that revenue with contributors; but effective November 1, 2013, that revenue sharing program was terminated.

== History ==
Suite101 was started in 1996 in Vancouver, British Columbia. The original founders included non-fiction and fiction writers who invited local writers to visit the site and post articles about a range of topics. The site continued for nearly a decade (1996–2005) by simply being a source for writers to share their knowledge. During this time, online courses called "Suite University" were offered in an attempt to create revenue for the company, but this effort did not survive.

By 2005, unique visitors to the site had reached four million per month. In 2006 the company was purchased by Canadian and German investors including Boris Wertz, a past founder of JustBooks.de and a previous COO at Abebooks.com. He was joined in the purchase by the digital media arm of Hubert Burda Media, one of Germany's leading publishing houses. Under this new leadership, Suite101 expanded its editorial team, in part by recruiting contract editors from book and magazine publishing. On the business model side, the site, under new CEO Peter Berger, added advertising to each article page through a partnership with Google AdSense.

In September 2008, Suite101 expanded into Europe by launching Suite101.de and establishing an office in Berlin. This was followed by launching Suite101.fr in France, and Suite101.net in Spain in 2009, and establishing offices in Paris and Madrid.

In November 2009, Suite101.com was named by comScore as one of the top 10 fastest growing websites based on US traffic growth.

In 2011, the effects of Google's Panda algorithm updates reduced Suite101's readership by 60%. Soon after, Suite101.com appointed Michael Kedda as CEO. Kedda relaunched the site in 2012 as a community-oriented publishing platform.

In March 2013, Suite101 ceased publishing articles as the team behind the site works on a new project.
