= Flags (Brooke Fraser album) =

Studio album by Brooke Fraser
- Released: 8 October 2010
- Recorded: 2010
- Studio: EastWest (Los Angeles)
- Genre: Pop
- Length: 45:16
- Labels: Sony, Wood and Bone
- Producer: Brooke Fraser

Brooke Fraser chronology
Albertine (2006)	Flags (2010)	Brutal Romantic (2014)

Singles from Flags
- 1. "Something in the Water" Released: 2 August 2010; 2. "Betty" Released: 6 December 2010; 3. "Coachella" Released: 25 April 2011

Flags is the third studio album by New Zealand singer and songwriter, Brooke Fraser. It was released on 8 October 2010 by Sony Music Entertainment in Australia. Fraser undertook a concert tour in New Zealand, North America, the United Kingdom and Australia to promote the album.

The album has been commercially successful in Australia and New Zealand, peaking at No. 3 and No. 1 on the charts of those countries respectively. It has also appeared on various Billboard charts. The lead single, country-pop song "Something in the Water", has peaked at No. 1 on the New Zealand Singles Chart.

== Background and release ==
Fraser cited her move to Los Angeles as a major inspiration, saying "I was really frustrated and felt like I needed to get away and be somewhere where I could completely focus...and just to try and get a little bit of head space. It was the best decision we ever made". She called Flags "a graduation".

Writers of tracks on Flags include Fraser, her husband Scott Ligertwood, and Switchfoot's Jon Foreman. The album was produced by Fraser herself, which she called "one of the scariest things I've ever done". According to Fraser, "Crows + Locusts" was inspired by a farming family, while "Ice on Her Lashes" is about death and grief. "Betty" is based on hiding things. The title track, "Flags", was brought about by cultural identity and injustice.

Flags was released by Sony Music Entertainment in Australia on 8 October, and in New Zealand on 11 October. Wood and Bone released the album in the United Kingdom and the United States on 12 October.

== Reception ==
=== Critical reception ===
Flags
Review scores
Source	Rating
Allmusic	3.5/5 stars
CCM Magazine	4/5 stars
Christianity Today	4/5 stars
Cross Rhythms	10/10 stars
The Dominion Post	3.5/5 stars
Indie Vision Music	4/5 stars
Jesus Freak Hideout	5/5 stars
New Release Tuesday	4.5/5 stars
The New Zealand Herald	4/5 stars
Soul Shine Magazine	4/5 stars

Flags garnered critical acclaim from ten ratings by music critics. Jen Rose of Jesus Freak Hideout gave Flags five out of five stars, appreciating Fraser's versatility on the album, and noted it as a highlight of 2010 music. The Nelson Mail's Nick Ward praised Fraser's maturity on the album, noting the balance of both dark and joyful songs. John Brandon from Christianity Today lauded the "slick production and lighter tone" on Flags, rating it four out of five stars. Russell Baillie of The New Zealand Herald commended Fraser's writing and production skills, rating it four out of five. Andrew Leahey of Allmusic said that Fraser "stretches her boundaries by focusing on ambience and atmospheric textures", and rating the album three-and-a-half out of five stars, dubbing it "a pleasant listen even during its weaker moments". The Dominion Post's Tom Cardy registered that while "Fraser works within the confines of conventional pop and rock...she largely avoids its worst excesses", also rating the album three-and-a-half out of five.

Matt Conner of CCM Magazine gave Flags four out of four stars noting that it "doesn't live up to Albertine", but it was still an impressive effort. Mike Rimmer of Cross Rhythms gave Flags ten out of ten commenting that "With a beautiful voice, intelligent heartfelt arrangements and perfectly crafted songs, Brooke's career continues on an upward trajectory." Kevin Davis of New Release Tuesday gave Flags four-and-a-half stars out of five calling it a "stunning album". Lindsay Whitfield of Soul Shine Magazine gave Flags four stars out of five writing that "Fraser has yet again proven she is not to be grouped with many of the shoe-gazing acoustic acts out there today, she writes exceptionally-crafted songs with purposeful lyrics and catchy backbeats and is as much a great author in my books as she is a great songwriter." Joshua Hedlund of Indie Vision Music gave Flags four stars out of four noting that "The excellent lyrics are delivered in Fraser's simple, soothing, strong vocals."

=== Commercial performance ===
Flags debuted at No. 1 on the New Zealand Albums Chart on 18 October 2010, receiving a gold certification the same week for shipping over 7,500 copies. Flags has gone on to achieve 3× Platinum sales in New Zealand being the 6th highest selling album of 2010. The same week, the album's lead single "Something in the Water" moved up two places into No. 1 on the singles chart. This was the first time a New Zealand artist secured the top positions in both the singles and albums chart since June 2004, when Ben Lummis' One Road and "They Can't Take That Away" were No. 1. On the week ending 24 October 2010, the album debuted on the Australian Albums Chart at No. 3, going on to achieve Gold certification. The album entered the Canadian Albums Chart on 21 October 2010 at No. 80, giving Fraser her first chart success in the country. In the United States, Flags debuted on the Billboard 200 at No. 59 on 30 October 2010. The same week it also appeared on the Rock Albums chart at No. 19, the Digital Albums Chart at No. 14, the Independent Albums chart at No. 9, and the Folk Albums Chart at No. 4. Flags was released in July 2011 in Germany, Austria and Switzerland and debuted in the following positions: No. 6 in Germany, No. 24 in Switzerland and No. 33 in Austria. One month on from release, Flags remained in the German top 20 at No. 13 and "Something in the Water" on the singles charts at No. 8. Flags was released in October 2011 in Hungary, reaching No. 15 on the national album chart by week by the 2nd week. "Flags" was released in Sweden, Norway, Denmark and Finland on 7 November 2011.

== Singles ==
"Something in the Water" was released as the album's first single, on 2 August 2010. Received positively by critics, it was described as "an unexpectedly perky country-pop ditty". The song debuted on the New Zealand Singles Chart of 9 August 2010 at No. 10. It was certified gold by the Recording Industry Association of New Zealand in early October, and, on 18 October, topped the singles chart, succeeding "Just the Way You Are" by Bruno Mars. It only lasted one week in the top position, however, being replaced by "Like a G6" by Far East Movement on 25 October 2010. The song stayed on the chart for a total of twenty-nine weeks and has since achieved double platinum sales in New Zealand. In Australia, the song debuted and peaked at No. 29 on the ARIA Singles Chart, lasting six weeks. The second single from Flags was "Betty", released on 6 December 2010. "Coachella" was released on 25 April 2011.

"Something in the Water" has gone on to achieve extensive radio success in Europe, notably receiving BBC Radio 2 A-list rotation upon release. The single has reached No. 2 in the Dutch airplay chart whilst residing in the top 5 singles chart for 6 consecutive weeks. The single has charted in Poland and Belgium at No. 15 and No. 23 respectively, as well as being certified Gold in both Germany and Italy.

== Tour ==
After the album's release, Fraser toured New Zealand, United States, Canada, United Kingdom, Australia, France and Italy.

== Track listing ==
No.	Title	Writer(s)	Length
1.	"Something in the Water"	Brooke Fraser, Scott Ligertwood	3:02
2.	"Betty"	Fraser, Jon Foreman, Ben West	2:58
3.	"Orphans, Kingdoms"	Fraser	3:54
4.	"Who Are We Fooling" (featuring Aqualung)	Fraser, Matthew Hales	4:25
5.	"Ice on Her Lashes"	Fraser	5:44
6.	"Coachella"	Fraser	3:32
7.	"Jack Kerouac"	Fraser	3:25
8.	"Sailboats"	Fraser	3:18
9.	"Crows + Locusts"	Fraser	5:47
10.	"Here's to You"	Fraser	4:22
11.	"Flags"	Fraser	4:46
Total length:			45:16

Deluxe Edition
No.	Title	Length
12.	"May Waltz"	2:57
13.	"Woodstock"	4:12
14.	"You Can Close Your Eyes" (featuring William Fitzsimmons)	2:24
15.	"Coachella" (Extended Version)	4:33
16.	"Flags" (Acoustic Version)	5:20

== Personnel ==
Credits for Flags adapted from AllMusic.

- Brooke Fraser – vocals, keyboards, guitars
- Ben West – keyboards, backing vocals
- Matthew Hales – keyboards (4), backing vocals (4)
- Michael Chaves – guitars, backing vocals
- David Levita – guitars, backing vocals
- Michael Guy Chislett – guitar (6)
- Curt Schneider – bass, backing vocals
- Aaron Redfield – drums, percussion, backing vocals
- Danny T. Levin – horns
- Keith Tutt II – cello
- Beth Balmer – viola, backing vocals
- Stevie Blacke – strings (5, 11)
- Cary Brothers – backing vocals
- William Fitzsimmons – backing vocals, vocals (12)
- Jon Foreman – backing vocals, whistle
- Laura Jansen – backing vocals

=== Production ===
- Campbell Smith – executive producer, management
- Brooke Fraser – producer
- Joe Zook – recording, mixing
- Eric Robinson – additional recording
- Bob Ludwig – mastering at Gateway Mastering (Portland, Maine)
- Boh Runga – vocal production assistance
- Scott Ligertwood – artwork, design
- Andy Barron – artwork, design, studio photography
- Nirrimi Hakanson – photography
- Paul McKessar – management

== Charts ==
=== Weekly ===
Weekly chart performance for Flags
Chart (2010)	Peak position
Australian Albums (ARIA)	3
Canadian Albums (Billboard)	80
French Albums (SNEP)	96
Hungarian Albums (MAHASZ)	15
New Zealand Albums (RMNZ)	1
Swiss Albums (Schweizer Hitparade)	9
US Billboard 200	59
US Americana/Folk Albums (Billboard)	4
US Digital Albums (Billboard)	14
US Independent Albums (Billboard)	9
US Top Rock Albums (Billboard)	19

=== Year-end ===
Year-end chart performance for Flags
Chart (2010)	Position
New Zealand Albums (RMNZ)	6
Chart (2011)	Position
New Zealand Albums (RMNZ)	24

== Certifications ==
Country	Certification
New Zealand	3× Platinum
Germany	Gold
Australia	Gold

== See also ==
- List of number-one albums in 2010 (New Zealand)
