= Lifeline (Brooke Fraser song) =

2003 single by Brooke Fraser

- New Zealand CD single artwork

Single by Brooke Fraser

from the album What to Do with Daylight
- Released: 9 November 2003
- Genre: Pop
- Length: 4:08 (album version); 4:00 (single version)
- Label: Columbia
- Songwriter: Brooke Fraser
- Producer: Brady Blade

Brooke Fraser singles chronology
"Better" (2003)	"Lifeline" (2003)	"Saving the World" (2004)

Alternative Cover
- Australian CD single artwork

"Lifeline" is the second single by New Zealand singer Brooke Fraser from her debut album, What to Do with Daylight (2003). The song peaked at number seven in New Zealand and was Fraser's first single to be released in Australia, where it reached number 56 in September 2004.

== Song information ==
"Lifeline" was re-recorded in Sydney for its Australian release with a more rockier sound, with additional guitars and vocal arrangement changes added to the track. In addition, the video for Lifeline was re-written and re-filmed. As well as this, the cover was changed to a side-on shot of Fraser in an armchair, notably the same image and design from the cover of Fraser's first release, "Better", with only the song's titles being swapped on the exterior cover. In Australia, "Lifeline" was Fraser's first single to be released, on 20 September 2004.

== Music videos ==
There were two videos filmed for "Lifeline". One is for the original version of the song, which was released in New Zealand, and the other being the video for the re-recorded version.

=== New Zealand video ===
The original video for "Lifeline" showed Fraser and her band playing a game entitled 'Lifeline'. The game followed similar ruling as the game "Operation" where the game board was electrically charged and a shock results if your game piece touched the metal. The game, however, has no batteries in it so the keyboardist hooks the game to the buildings power battery. Each time a member of the band touches the metal, they disintegrate, as if they were electrocuted. The ending of the video leaves Fraser alone to make it to the final safe position on the board, but we find out she doesn't. The video is cut with interpolations of the band playing their instruments together, with each time a member of the band being eliminated from the game, they have also been taken from the band scene. This is how we know Fraser doesn't win the game, as the final shot of the video shows an empty band set.

=== International video ===
The international video for "Lifeline" was shot in various locations around the Auckland region of New Zealand. Each shot shows Fraser in similar positions, so as when the background and surroundings change, Fraser still remains in the relatively same spot. This gives the illusion of the video being "green screened", when it really is not (in a similar way to Bernard Fanning's video clip for Songbird). This version of the "Lifeline" video was shot to the re-recorded version of the song. The video was released to Australia, along with the release of What To Do With Daylight with an altered cover and this version of "Lifeline" replacing the previous version on the album.

== Charts ==
Chart (2003–2004)	Peak position
Australia (ARIA)	56
New Zealand (Recorded Music NZ)	7
