= What to Do with Daylight =

Studio album by Brooke Fraser
- Released: 29 October 2003
- Recorded: 2003
- Studio: York Street (Auckland); Helen Young (Auckland); 301 (Sydney) (Note: Reissue only)
- Genre: Pop
- Length: 49:07
- Label: Columbia, Sony BMG
- Producer: Brady Blade

Brooke Fraser chronology
What to Do with Daylight (2003)	Albertine (2006)

Singles from What To Do With Daylight
- 1. "Better" Released: 30 June 2003; 2. "Lifeline" Released: 9 November 2003; 3. "Saving the World" Released: 14 March 2004; 4. "Arithmetic" Released: 19 July 2004; 5. "Without You" Released: 17 January 2005

Professional ratings
Review scores
Source	Rating
NZ Girl	5/5 stars

What to Do with Daylight is the debut album by New Zealand singer/songwriter, Brooke Fraser released in 2004. What to Do with Daylight was the top New Zealand album for 2004 (according to RIANZ), and went seven times Platinum.

The album title comes from the album's first track "Arithmetic", as heard in the line "Wondering what to do with daylight/Until I can make you mine". The song was released as the album's fourth single in New Zealand.

All five singles from the album reached the top 20 NZ singles chart and achieved No. 1 airplay status.

== Track listing ==
All tracks are written by Brooke Fraser.

No.	Title	Length
1.	"Arithmetic"	4:01
2.	"Saving the World"	4:10
3.	"Still in Love"	4:28
4.	"Lifeline"	4:08
5.	"Waste Another Day"	5:25
6.	"Without You"	2:59
7.	"Reverie"	5:14
8.	"Indelible"	4:38
9.	"Better"	4:05
10.	"Scarlet"	5:57
11.	"Mystery"	4:02
Total length:		49:07

== Special edition ==
What To Do With Daylight was also re-released as a two disc CD+DVD "Special Edition" in 2004, following the album's success. The first disc was the album with the second disc being a live DVD of four songs from the album. This set also came with a slipcase cover with a different photo of Fraser. The DVD was filmed and recorded live at The Pumphouse, Takapuna, Auckland on 2 April 2004.

Live DVD track list:

1. "Saving the World"
2. "Lifeline"
3. "Arithmetic"
4. "Better"

== Personnel ==
Credits adapted from CD liner notes.

- Brooke Fraser – lead vocals (all tracks), piano (1, 3–6, 8, 10, 11), acoustic guitar (2, 4–6, 8, 9), backing vocals (3, 4, 7, 9), crowd noise (3), handclaps (3), Rhodes piano (3), Wurlitzer (7)
- Brady Blade – production (all tracks), percussion (1–3, 5–7), drums (2, 3, 5–7, 9, 11), crowd noise (3), handclaps (3), loops (3), guitar (9)
- Don Bartley – mastering (4)
- Mahuia Bridgman-Cooper – violin (1, 11)
- Julia Broom – violin (1, 11)
- Andy van Dette – mastering (all tracks)
- Julia Dibley – violin (1, 11)
- Alistair Greenwood – flute (8)
- Godfrey de Grut – Korg Triton (1, 5), string arrangements (1, 11), piano (2), crowd noise (3), handclaps (3), Rhodes piano (5, 9), Hammond organ (7, 9)
- Anton Hagot – recording (4)
- Peau Halapua – violin (1, 11)
- Elroy Hall – viola (1, 11)
- Daniel Irvine – bass guitar (1–3, 9–11), handclaps (3)
- Ben King – acoustic guitar (2), guitar (2), backing vocals (2), vocal arrangements (2)
- Bruce Lynch – acoustic bass (6)
- Geoff Maddock – guitar (2)
- Nic Manders – guitar (2, 3, 5, 8, 11), crowd noise (3), mixing (all tracks), recording (all tracks)
- Ben Nation – cello (1, 11)
- Scotty Pearson – percussion (3)
- Nathan Porter – Hammond organ (3, 5, 7), Rhodes piano (3)
- Steve Roberts – dubs (7), technical assistance
- Matt Ruys – handclaps (3), backing vocals (9), vocal arrangements (9)
- Sean Sturm – guitar (1, 2, 5, 9, 11), handclaps (3)
- Marcus Vanilau – Mellotron (10)
- Roy Venkataraman – guitar (3, 6, 7)
- Rick Will – mixing (4)
- Carl Young – bass guitar (5, 7)

== Charts and certifications ==
What To Do With Daylight debuted at number one on the New Zealand RIANZ Album Chart. It was also certified Gold in the first week with sales of over 7,500. Within three weeks the album was certified Platinum with sales of over 15,000. The album had a 66-week run on the New Zealand chart dating from 16 November 2003 – 28 February 2005, and would go on to reach number one a further two times and be certified 7× Platinum.

=== Weekly charts ===
Chart (2003)	Peak position
New Zealand Albums (RMNZ)	1

=== Year-end charts ===
Chart (2004)	Position
New Zealand Albums (RMNZ)	1

=== Certifications ===
Certifications for What to Do with Daylight
Region	Certification	Certified units/sales
New Zealand (RMNZ)	7× Platinum	105,000^{^}
^{^} Shipments figures based on certification alone.
