= Arithmetic (song) =

2004 single by Brooke Fraser

Single by Brooke Fraser

from the album What to Do with Daylight
- Released: 16 August 2004
- Length: 4:01
- Label: Columbia
- Songwriter: Brooke Fraser
- Producer: Brady Blade

Brooke Fraser singles chronology
"Saving the World" (2004)	"Arithmetic" (2004)	"Without You" (2005)

"Arithmetic" is a song by New Zealand singer-songwriter Brooke Fraser released in 2004. The song is the first track of Fraser's debut album, What to Do with Daylight (2004). "Arithmetic" peaked at number eight on the New Zealand Singles Chart in September 2004.

== Music video ==
The music video for "Arithmetic" features Brooke Fraser in a dimly lit studio surrounded by fairy lights and with fairy lights all over her piano. As the song only features piano and a string quartet, the quartet is also visible in another part of the studio with their music stands also lit by fairy lights. For this abundance of fairy lights, "Arithmetic" was awarded the satirical award for "Most used fairy lights in a video clip" in the 2004 Studio 2 Awards.

== Track listing ==
All tracks were written by Fraser except "Something in the Way She Moves", written by James Taylor.

1. "Arithmetic"
2. "Mystery" (live version)
3. "Something in the Way She Moves" (live version)

== Charts ==
Weekly chart performance for "Arithmetic"
Chart (2004)	Peak position
New Zealand (Recorded Music NZ)	8

== Certifications ==
Certifications for "Arithmetic"
Region	Certification	Certified units/sales
New Zealand (RMNZ)	Gold	7,500^{*}
^{*} Sales figures based on certification alone.
