= Honey in the Rock (song) =

2022 single by Brooke Ligertwood and Brandon Lake

Single by Brooke Ligertwood and Brandon Lake

from the album Seven
- Released: 25 March 2022
- Recorded: 11 November 2021
- Venue: The Belonging Co, Nashville, Tennessee, US
- Genre: Contemporary worship music
- Length: 4:44
- Label: Sparrow; Capitol CMG
- Songwriters: Brandon Lake; Brooke Ligertwood; Mitch Wong
- Producers: Brooke Ligertwood; Robin T Pawandiwa: Jason Ingram

Brooke Ligertwood singles chronology
"A Thousand Hallelujahs" (2022)	"Honey in the Rock" (2022)	"Fear Of God" (2023)

Brandon Lake singles chronology
"Silent Night (Emmanuel)" (2021)	"Honey in the Rock" (2022)	"Help!" (2022)

Music videos
- "Honey in the Rock" on YouTube
- "Honey in the Rock" (Acoustic) on YouTube
- "Honey in the Rock" (Live from Passion 2022) on YouTube
- "Honey in the Rock" (Lyrics) on YouTube

"Honey in the Rock" is a song by New Zealand singer-songwriter Brooke Ligertwood and American contemporary worship musician Brandon Lake. It impacted Christian radio stations in the United States on 25 March 2022, becoming the second single from Ligertwood's first live album, Seven (2022). Brooke Ligertwood and Brandon Lake co-wrote the song with Mitch Wong. The single was produced by Brooke Ligertwood and Jason Ingram.

"Honey in the Rock" peaked at number seven on the US Hot Christian Songs chart. At the 2023 GMA Dove Awards, "Honey in the Rock" was nominated for the Song of the Year award.

== Background ==
On 25 February 2022, Brooke Ligertwood announced that "Honey in the Rock" with Brandon Lake would be the second single from her live album, Seven (2022), releasing its music video that same day. "Honey in the Rock" impacted Christian radio stations in the United States on 25 March 2022. On 1 July 2022, Ligertwood released a multi-track single of "Honey in the Rock" on digital platforms.

Ligertwood shared the story behind the song, saying:

It's based out of scripture in Psalm 89 which talks about how the Lord feeds us with honey from the rock. In the wilderness we can still experience sweetness because we trust and know Jesus.

Ligertwood's reference here is incorrect; mention of honey from the rock is found in Psalm 81.

== Composition ==
"Honey in the Rock" is composed in the key of D with a tempo of 62 beats per minute and a musical time signature of 4/4.

== Critical reception ==
In a NewReleaseToday review, Jasmine Patterson opined that the song is "the perfect Contemporary meets Gospel moment and it will take you straight to church. It’s a joyful declaration of God’s faithful provision in our lives, and the lyrics reference well-known Old Testament stories of miraculous provision." Gerod Bass of Worship Musician magazine wrote in his review: "The groovy southern rocker uses the experiences of the Israelites in the desert to remind us that God always provides for His people." Reviewing for 365 Days of Inspiring Media, Jonathan Andre congratulated Ligertwood for the song, saying "Well done Brooke for this track, a song that that can hopefully break down boundaries between CCM and…well, everything else."

=== Awards and nominations ===
Awards
Year	Organization	Award	Result	Ref
2023	GMA Dove Awards	Worship Recorded Song of the Year	Nominated	

== Commercial performance ==
"Honey in the Rock" debuted at number 40 on the US Hot Christian Songs chart dated 12 March 2022, concurrently charting at number ten on the Christian Digital Song Sales chart.

"Honey in the Rock" debuted at number 43 on the US Christian Airplay chart dated 19 March 2022.

== Music videos ==
On 25 February 2022, Brooke Ligertwood released the live performance video of "Honey in the Rock" with Brandon Lake via YouTube. The live performance video was recorded on 11 November 2021, at The Belonging Co, a church in Nashville, Tennessee. Ligertwood also published the lyric video of the song via YouTube on the same day, as well as the official acoustic performance video of the song. On 23 August 2022, Passion released the live performance video of the song with Ligertwood and Lake leading it in concert at Passion 2022 conference.

== Performances ==
On 14 March 2022, Brooke Ligertwood and Brandon Lake performed on "Honey in the Rock" on The Kelly Clarkson Show.

== Track listing ==
Honey in the Rock
No.	Title	Writer(s)	Producer(s)	Length
1.	"Honey in the Rock" (Live; with Brandon Lake)	Brooke Ligertwood; Brandon Lake; Mitch Wong	Brooke Ligertwood; Jason Ingram	4:43
2.	"Honey in the Rock" (Live from Passion 2022; with Brandon Lake and Passion)		Brooke Ligertwood; Jason Ingram; Jon Duke; Louie Giglio; Passion; Shelley Giglio	5:11
3.	"Honey in the Rock" (Acoustic; with Brandon Lake)		Brooke Ligertwood; Jason Ingram	4:33
Total length:				14:29

Honey in the Rock — Apple Music bonus video content
No.	Title	Length
4.	"Honey in the Rock" (Live in Nashville, TN/2021)	4:46
Total length:		19:15

== Personnel ==
Adapted from AllMusic.

- Josh Bailey — A&R
- Jonathan Baines — vocals
- Lorenzo Baylor — vocals
- Natalie Brown — vocals
- Jonathan Buffum — engineer
- Cassie Campbell — bass
- Angelique Carter — vocals
- Tamar Chipp — vocals
- Taylor Clarke — mixing
- David Dennis — vocals
- Emily Douglas — vocals
- Jackson Dreyer — vocals
- Katelyn Drye — vocals
- Jon Duke — executive producer, producer
- Ernesto Edwards — electric guitar
- Enaka Enyong — vocals
- Jenna Lee Fair — vocals
- Luke Fredrickson — mixing
- David Funk — keyboards, programmer
- Sarah Gerald — vocals
- Sam Gibson — mixing
- Louie Giglio — executive producer, producer
- Shelley Giglio— executive producer, producer
- Olivia Grasso — vocals
- Ainslie Grosser — recording
- Cecily Hennigan — vocals
- Jason Ingram — engineer, producer, programmer
- Nicole Johnson — vocals
- Carrie Karpinen — A&R
- Benji Kurokose — vocals
- Brandon Lake — acoustic guitar, Hammond B3, primary artist, vocals
- Shantrice Laura — vocals
- Drew Lavyne — mastering engineer
- Jonathan Lee — electric guitar, guitar
- Brooke Ligertwood — acoustic guitar, guitar, keyboards, primary artist, producer, vocals
- Allison Marin — strings
- Antonio Marin — strings
- Daniella Mason— background vocals, choir arrangement
- Daniel McMurray — drums
- Jonathan Mix — engineer
- Noah Moreno — vocals
- Brecken Myers — vocals
- Angela Nasby — vocals
- Passion — primary artist, producer
- Jordyn Pierce — vocals
- Marci Pruzina — vocals
- Christine Rhee — vocals
- Andrea Roth — A&R
- Emily Ruff — vocals
- Rylee Scott — vocals
- Zack Smith — vocals
- Cheryl Stark — vocals
- Keithon Stribling — vocals
- Dylan Thomas — guitar
- Bria Valderrama — vocals
- Robby Valderrama — vocals
- David Whitworth — drums
- John Wilds — vocals
- Mitch Wong — vocals
- Steph Wong — vocals

== Charts ==
=== Weekly charts ===
Weekly chart performance for "Honey in the Rock"
Chart (2022)	Peak position
New Zealand Hot Singles (RMNZ)	23
US Hot Christian Songs (Billboard)	7
US Christian Airplay (Billboard)	9
US Christian AC (Billboard)	12

=== Year-end charts ===
Year-end chart performance for "Honey in the Rock"
Chart (2022)	Position
US Christian Songs (Billboard)	26
US Christian Airplay (Billboard)	36
US Christian AC (Billboard)	40

== Certifications ==
Region	Certification	Certified units/sales
United States (RIAA)	Gold	500,000^{‡}
^{‡} Sales+streaming figures based on certification alone.

== Release history ==
Release dates and formats for "Honey in the Rock"
Region	Date	Format	Label	Ref.
United States	25 March 2022	Christian radio	Sparrow; Capitol CMG	
Various	1 July 2022	Digital download; streaming	Sparrow; Capitol CMG	
