= Deciphering Me =

Single by Brooke Fraser

from the album Albertine
- Released: 27 September 2006
- Recorded: Track Record, North Hollywood, CA. 2006
- Genre: Pop
- Length: 4:12
- Label: Columbia
- Songwriter: Brooke Fraser
- Producer: Marshall Altman

Brooke Fraser singles chronology
"Without You" (2005)	"Deciphering Me" (2006)	"Shadowfeet" (2007)

"Deciphering Me" is artist/songwriter Brooke Fraser's sixth single, and her first single from her second studio album Albertine. The song debuted on the New Zealand Singles Chart at number forty on 23 October 2006 and on 4 December 2006, peaked at number four. It remained on the chart for a total of twenty two non-consecutive weeks, nine of them being in the top ten. The single includes two B-sides, a live piano backed version of the title track and a demo track, "Day Is Dimming". Both were recorded at Sony Studios in Sydney. Deciphering Me was performed live on the current affairs show Close Up on 1 December. During the preceding interview, Fraser stated that the song is about "vulnerability and trust". This was in fact one of presenter Susan Wood's last shows before her resignation due to health problems.

== Music video ==
Brooke Fraser standing outside the Yodobashi Camera Head Store in Nishi-shinjuku, Tokyo.

The music video for the single was directed by Anthony Rose. It took two days to shoot and was filmed in Tokyo, Japan, on 2 October 2006 and 3 October 2006. The music video depicts Fraser walking through late night Tokyo in the rain, backed by scenery of neon-lit buildings. She appears in such places as the Nishi-shinjuku business district, Shibuya Center-gai shopping area. One following scene shows Fraser on the Tokyo metropolitan train system. All the while as she does this, she holds a transparent umbrella and lip-synchs to her song. The final scenes show her return to her hotel building, take the elevator and stand on the rooftop.

== Track listing ==
#	Title	Writer(s)	Duration
1.	"Deciphering Me"	Brooke Fraser	4:12
2.	"Deciphering Me (Live Piano Version)"	Brooke Fraser	3:55
3.	"Day Is Dimming (Demo)"	Brooke Fraser	6:14

== Charts ==
Chart (2006)	Peak position
New Zealand (Recorded Music NZ)	4

== Certifications ==
Certifications for "Deciphering Me"
Region	Certification	Certified units/sales
New Zealand (RMNZ)	Gold	7,500^{*}
^{*} Sales figures based on certification alone.
