= Better (Brooke Fraser song) =

2003 single by Brooke Fraser

Single by Brooke Fraser

from the album What to Do with Daylight
- B-side: "Pliable" (live acoustic)
- Released: 30 June 2003
- Length: 4:05
- Label: Columbia
- Songwriter(s): Brooke Fraser
- Producer(s): Brady Blade

Brooke Fraser singles chronology
"Better" (2003)	"Lifeline" (2004)

"Better" is a song by New Zealand singer-songwriter Brooke Fraser from her first album, What to Do with Daylight (2003). It was released as her debut single in 2003 and reached number three on the New Zealand Singles Chart.

== Song information ==
This was the song that introduced and launched Fraser as a recording artist in New Zealand. She wrote the song when she was in the seventh form in high school. The song was also used in the New Zealand advertisements for World Vision, with Brooke appearing in them as well.

== Chart performance ==
"Better" debuted on the New Zealand Singles Chart at number fifty on 6 July 2003 and peaked at number three where it stayed for four weeks. The song spent a total of twenty two weeks on the chart. Furthermore, the single was the tenth biggest song in the year-end Top 50 Singles of 2003.

== Music video ==
In the video, Temuera Morrison played Brooke's father. He is basically a drunken and abusive father that can never take care of himself, and Brooke is looking for a way out.

== Track listing ==
1. "Better" (6/8 version) (4:02)
2. "Better" (4/4 version) (3:54)
3. "Pliable" (live acoustic mix) (3:28)

== Charts ==
=== Weekly charts ===
Chart (2003)	Peak position
New Zealand (Recorded Music NZ)	3

=== Year-end charts ===
Chart (2003)	Position
New Zealand (RIANZ)	10
