= Brutal Romantic =

Studio album by Brooke Fraser
- Released: 18 November 2014
- Genre: Pop
- Length: 37:05
- Label: Vagrant
- Producer: Brooke Fraser: David Kosten; Dan Wilson (Track 8)

Brooke Fraser chronology
Flags (2010)	Brutal Romantic (2014)	A Sides (2016)

Singles from Brutal Romantic
- 1. "Kings & Queens" Released: 23 September 2014

Brutal Romantic is the fourth studio album by New Zealand singer-songwriter Brooke Fraser, and the last to be released under her maiden name to date. It was released on 18 November 2014 in Australia, New Zealand, North America and Asia, and in Spring 2015 in Europe. It was produced by Fraser and David Kosten. It was recorded at Kosten's West London studio, and the orchestral parts were recorded at the legendary Abbey Road Studios.

The album's first track "Psychosocial" was released 13 August 2014 as a taster track ahead of the album's first single "Kings & Queens", which was sent to radio 23 September 2014.

== Track listing ==
No.	Title	Writer(s)	Length
1.	"Psychosocial"	Brooke Fraser	3:01
2.	"Thunder"	Fraser, Matt Hales	3:39
3.	"Start a War"	Fraser, Scott Ligertwood	3:10
4.	"Kings & Queens"	Fraser, Ligertwood, Joel Pott	3:36
5.	"Bloodrush"	Fraser	3:39
6.	"Brutal Romance"	Fraser	4:46
7.	"Je Suis Pret"	Fraser, Kid Harpoon	4:24
8.	"Magical Machine"	Fraser, Dan Wilson	4:05
9.	"New Histories"	Fraser, Tobias Fröberg	3:39
10.	"New Year's Eve"	Fraser	3:00
Total length:			37:05

== Personnel ==
- Brooke Fraser – vocals, keyboards (1, 2, 4, 6, 7, 9, 10), programming (1, 10), acoustic piano (2–7), guitars (2, 5)
- David Kosten – synthesizers, programming, percussion (2, 4, 5)
- Matt Hales – additional programming (2)
- Ryan Taubert – additional programming (4)
- Dan Wilson – keyboards (8)
- Tobias Fröberg – synthesizers (9), guitars (9)
- Kid Harpoon – guitars (7)
- James Ahwai – bass (2, 4, 5, 10)
- Jason Cooper – drums (4, 6, 7)
- IDMC Choir – choir (1, 7)
- John Fisher – choirmaster (1, 7)
- Joel Pott – additional vocals (4)

Orchestra

- John Metcalfe – arrangements and conductor

Horns on "Brutal Romance"

- Dave Stewart – bass trombone
- Andy Wood – tenor trombone
- Philip Easop, Martin Owen, David Pyatt and Richard Watkins – French horn

Strings on "Brutal Romance" and "Magical Machine"

- Lucy Whaley – string fixing
- Louise Fuller – string leader
- Chris Allen, Ian Burdge, Vicki Matthews, Nick Roberts, Jonathan Tunnell and Bozidar Vulkotic – cello
- Colin Paris, Beth Simmons, Allen Walley and Chris West – double bass
- Rolad Chbah, Bill Hawkes, Nick Pendlebury, Rose Redgrave, Rachel Roberts and Steve Toos – viola
- Natalie Bonner, Gillon Cameron, Frances Dewar, Alison Dods, Louise Fuller, Richard George, Kathy Gowers, Pete Hanson, Claire Hayes, Ian Humphries, Rick Koster, Oll Langford, Nicky Sweeney and Chris Windass – violin

=== Production ===
- Paul Harris – A&R
- Brooke Fraser – producer, additional recording (1, 3, 10)
- David Kosten – producer, recording, mixing, vocal recording (6)
- Dan Wilson – producer (8)
- Mo Hausler – additional recording, additional editing
- Matt Hales – additional recording (2)
- Joel Pott – additional recording (4)
- Kid Harpoon – additional recording (7)
- Tobias Fröberg – additional recording (9)
- Al Lawson – recording assistant (1, 4, 6, 7), editing assistant (1, 4, 6, 7)
- Steve Orchard – vocal recording (6), orchestra recording (6, 8)
- Jamie Ashton – orchestra recording assistant (6, 8)
- Paul Pritchard – orchestra recording assistant (6, 8)
- John Rausch – vocal recording (8)
- Bob Ludwig – mastering at Gateway Mastering (Portland, Maine)
- Campbell Hooper – album artwork
- Paul McKessar – management
- Campbell Smith – management

== Charts ==
Chart (2014)	Peak position
Australian Albums (ARIA)	23
New Zealand Albums (RMNZ)	6
US Billboard 200	157
