= Eight (Brooke Ligertwood album) =

Studio album by Brooke Ligertwood
- Released: 20 October 2023
- Genre: Contemporary worship music
- Length: 56:35
- Labels: Sparrow; Capitol CMG
- Producer: Brooke Ligertwood

Brooke Ligertwood chronology
B Sides (2018)	Eight (2023)	Infinity (2024)

Eight is the fifth studio album by New Zealand singer-songwriter Brooke Ligertwood and her eighth solo album overall. The album features guest appearances by Martin Smith and Jon Wilds. The album consists of several re-recorded versions of her own songs during her tenure at Hillsong Worship and Hillsong United.

== Release ==
=== Singles ===
"Bless God" was released as a single from the album on April 5, 2024. "Fear of God" was released as the lead promotional single of Eight on 25 August 2023, accompanied with its live music video. "Desert Song" was released as the first promotional single followed by "Calvary's Enough".

The album was released on 20 October 2023, via Sparrow Records and Capitol Christian Music Group.

== Chart performance ==
The album was nominated for Worship Album of the Year at the 2024 GMA Dove Award, but did not win. It peaked at 6 on the Official Top 20 Aotearoa Albums, 13 on the UK Christian & Gospel Albums, 21 on the Billboard Christian Albums, and 94 on the UK Album Downloads charts.

== Track listing ==
Eight track listing
No.	Title	Writer(s)	Length
1.	"Bless God"	Brooke Ligertwood; Cody Carnes; Brandon Lake
2.	"Every Chance I Get"	B. Ligertwood; Carnes; Lake
3.	"Fear of God"	B. Ligertwood
4.	"Lead Me to the Cross"	B. Ligertwood
5.	"Desert Song"	B. Ligertwood
6.	"Authority"	B. Ligertwood; Scott Ligertwood; Chris Brown; Steven Furtick
7.	"I Will Exalt You"	B. Ligertwood
8.	"Calvary's Enough"	Aodhán King; B. Ligertwood; Scott Ligertwood
9.	"King of Kings"	B. Ligertwood; S. Ligertwood; Jason Ingram
10.	"Like Incense / Sometimes By Step"	B. Ligertwood; Rich Mullins; David Strasser
11.	"Soon"	B. Ligertwood
Total length:			56:35

== Charts ==
Weekly chart performance for Eight
Chart (2023)	Peak position
Aotearoa Albums (RMNZ)	6
UK Christian & Gospel Albums (Official Charts)	13
UK Album Downloads (Official Charts)	94
US Top Christian Albums (Billboard)	21
