= King of Kings (Hillsong song) =

Contemporary worship song

Single by Hillsong Worship featuring Brooke Ligertwood

from the album Awake
- Released: 12 July 2019
- Genre: Contemporary worship music
- Length: 4:25
- Label: Hillsong Music Australia
- Songwriter: Brooke Ligertwood · Scott Ligertwood · Jason Ingram
- Producer: Michael Guy Chislett · Brooke Ligertwood

Hillsong Worship featuring Brooke Ligertwood singles chronology
| "Who You Say I Am" (2018) | "King of Kings" (2019) | "Awake My Soul" (2020) |

"King of Kings" is a contemporary worship song by Hillsong Worship and is the lead single from their twenty-eighth album, Awake featuring Brooke Ligertwood. Released on 12 July 2019, Ligertwood wrote the song with her husband Scott Ligertwood and Jason Ingram and produced it with Michael Guy Chislett.

== Background ==
Speaking with Worship Together, Scott Ligertwood shared that "King of Kings" was written when they met in Nashville, Tennessee. Ingram wrote the melody and Brooke Ligertwood wrote the lyrics, which focus on the gospel and the birth of the early church.

About the song, Brooke Ligertwood said:

The Gospel is a now reality that requires a now response. It should never be treated or viewed as a relic - no matter how reverently one might err in that direction. With origins before time and echoes beyond it, it stands at the intersection of eternity and our every-day present and beckons, urges, demands us to look. Look at the Christ, the Son of God - bloodied for your sin and the sin of all humanity - repent and believe and take your place in the story of all stories - the story of the King of Kings.

The song was inspired by Biblical passages found in Revelation 19:16 and Philippians 2:9-11, capturing the sovereignty and exaltation of Jesus from humility to victory.

== Composition ==
"King of Kings" is composed in the key of D major. The song has a tempo of 68 BPM, with a time signature of 4/4.

== Music videos ==
The lyric video for "King of Kings" was published the same day the song was released (12 July), and the live music video, recorded during the 2019 Hillsong Conference, premiered on 5 August; both videos were published on YouTube. On 27 February 2020, the Spanish lyric video for the song was released, titled "Rey De Reyes". On 3 August 2020, a video showing Brooke Ligertwood singing the song at Passion 2020 was published.

== Awards and nominations ==
Awards
| Year | Organization | Award | Result | Ref |
|---|---|---|---|---|
| 2020 | GMA Dove Awards | Song of the Year | Nominated | |
| 2020 | GMA Dove Awards | Worship Recorded Song of the Year | Nominated | |

== Charts ==
=== Weekly charts ===
| Chart (2019–2020) | Peak position |
|---|---|
| New Zealand Hot Singles (Recorded Music NZ) | 29 |
| US Hot Christian Songs (Billboard) | 12 |
| US Christian Airplay (Billboard) | 17 |

=== Year-end charts ===
| Chart (2019) | Position |
|---|---|
| US Christian Songs (Billboard) | 63 |
| Chart (2020) | Position |
| US Christian Songs (Billboard) | 41 |
| US Christian AC (Billboard) | 50 |

== Certifications ==
| Region | Certification | Certified units/sales |
|---|---|---|
| United States (RIAA) | Gold | 500,000^{‡} |
^{‡} Sales+streaming figures based on certification alone.
