= The New Respects =

The New Respects is an American band from Nashville, Tennessee. The band consists of singer/guitarist Jasmine Mullen (daughter of Nicole C. Mullen), bass player Lexi Hill (née Fitzgerald), guitarist Zandy Mowry (née Fitzgerald), and drummer Darius Fitzgerald. In March 2017, they released their debut EP, Here Comes The Trouble, and in 2018, their debut full-length album titled Before The Sun Goes Down.

== Discography ==
Studio albums

- Before The Sun Goes Down (2018)

EPs

- Here Comes The Trouble (2017)
