= Brooke Fraser =

New Zealand musician (born 1983)

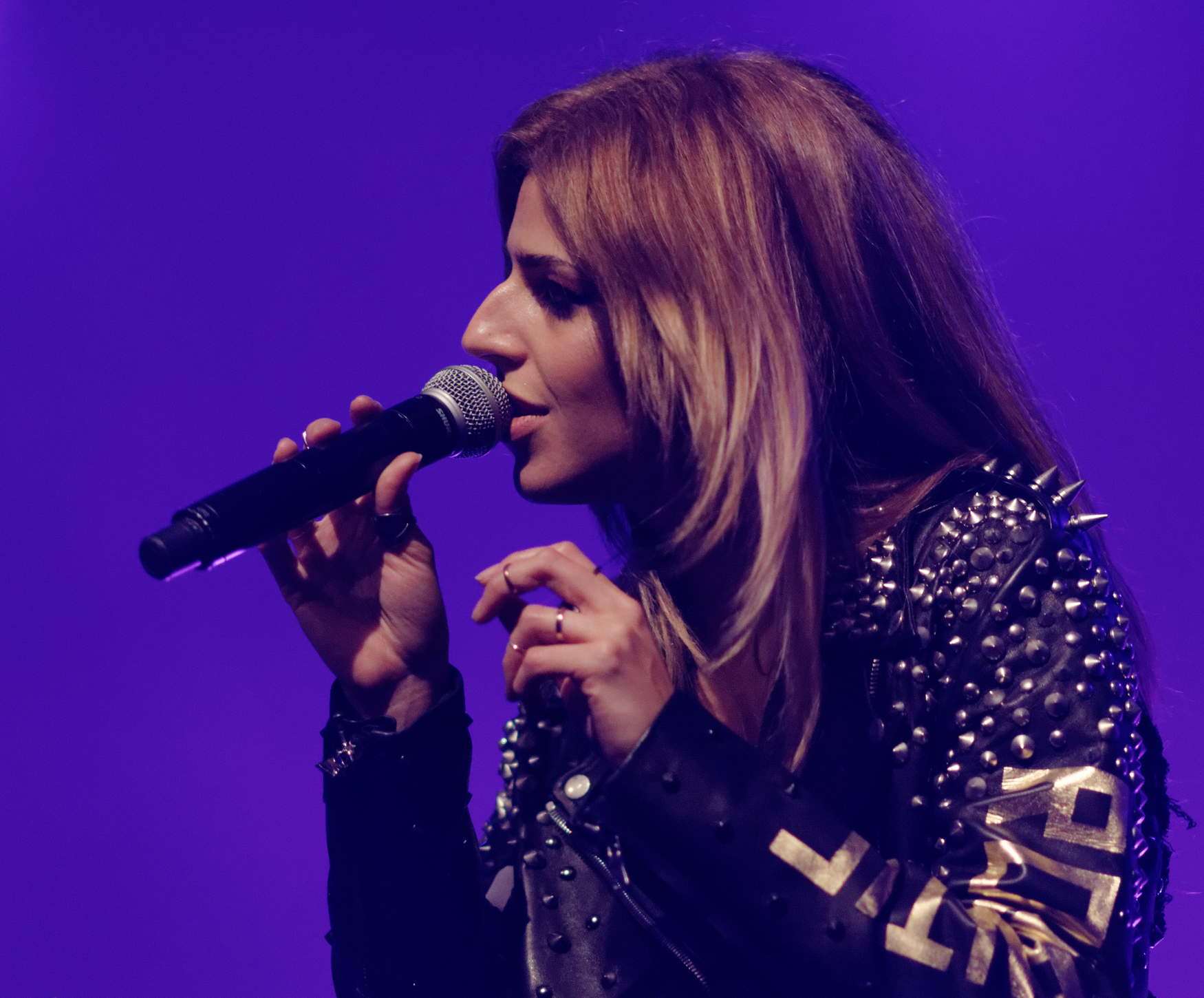
- Fraser in 2015

Background information
- Also known as: Brooke Ligertwood
- Born: Brooke Gabrielle Fraser; 15 December 1983 (age 42); Wellington, New Zealand
- Genres: CCM; CWM; pop
- Occupations: Singer; songwriter
- Instruments: Vocals; keyboards; guitar
- Years active: 2002–present
- Labels: Sony Music; Columbia; Vagrant; Play On; Time; Wood + Bone; Sparrow
- Spouse: Scott Ligertwood (m. 2008)
- Website: brookefraser.com

Brooke Gabrielle Ligertwood (née Fraser; born 15 December 1983) is a New Zealand singer and songwriter. She uses both her maiden and married names professionally. After signing with Sony BMG in 2002, she gained recognition for her debut album, What to Do with Daylight (2003) and followed with Albertine (2006) and Flags (2010). All three debuted at number one on the RMNZ chart and gained her the number-one single "Something in the Water". She later released Brutal Romantic (2014), various compilation albums, the live album Seven (2022), Eight (2023), and Eat (2026). The latter three were released by Capitol CMG under her married name, Brooke Ligertwood.

In 2005, Fraser became a member of the Australian Christian music group Hillsong Worship. She rejoined the group from 2016 until 2023, where she had performed various songs including "Who You Say I Am", "King of Kings" and "What a Beautiful Name". For the latter live track, Fraser won the Grammy Award for Best Contemporary Christian Music Performance in 2018.

== Early life ==
Named after Brooke Shields, Fraser is the eldest of three children born to former rugby player Bernie Fraser, who was born in Lautoka, Fiji, and his wife Lynda. Her father is of Fijian, Portuguese, and Scottish descent. She has two brothers: Matthew, who lives in Wellington, and Shea, who lives in Dunedin. Fraser grew up in Naenae, Lower Hutt and attended Dyer Street School, Naenae Intermediate School and Naenae College.

Fraser took piano lessons between the ages of seven and seventeen. She started writing songs at age twelve and taught herself the acoustic guitar at age fifteen. She began writing for the Soul Purpose magazine at age fifteen and was later made editor in 2002. She gave up her job as editor shortly after moving to Auckland in late 2002 in order to pursue her music career. In 2002, at the age of 18, Fraser signed a multi album deal with Sony Music, after a fierce bidding war between labels.

== Musical career ==
=== 2002−2004: Breakthrough with What to Do With Daylight ===
Fraser's first album, What to Do with Daylight, was released in New Zealand in late 2003, which debuted at No. 1 and achieved gold status the same week. The album eventually went seven times platinum, which sold over 105,000 copies in New Zealand alone. It remained on the album charts for sixty-six weeks. All five singles from the album reached the top twenty in the New Zealand Singles Chart. Her album also topped the New Zealand Top 50 Albums for all of 2004. The album also achieved gold status in Australia.

Following the release of What to Do with Daylight, Fraser toured Australia and New Zealand with American recording artist John Mayer and then toured New Zealand with veteran English rock artist David Bowie.

=== 2005−2009: Albertine, first tenure with Hillsong Worship, and other ventures ===
In 2005, prior to writing and preparing her follow-up album, Fraser went to Rwanda before visiting her World Vision sponsor children in Tanzania. Fraser wrote the song "Albertine" about a young genocide victim (named Albertine), whom she met while in Rwanda. This song became her second album's title track. For this album, Fraser decided to enlist a new band of American session musicians who had worked with an array of notable artists, both live and recorded.

In 2006, Fraser and the band went into the studio in New York City to record the album with producer Marshall Altman. The first single, "Deciphering Me", reached No. 4 in the New Zealand single charts in 2006. On 4 December 2006, the album, Albertine, was released in New Zealand, which achieved double platinum status less than a month after its release. The album was released in Australia and internationally on 31 March 2007. In Australia, it charted at No. 29 in its first week on 9 April and has achieved Gold sales status. Albertine also became Fraser's US debut, released on 27 May 2008. It entered the Billboard 200 at No. 90 on 19 July 2008. The album was propelled by online sales after being chosen as Editor's Choice on iTunes. In 2008, Fraser undertook a major world tour, culminating in the Montreal Jazz Festival and the Shepherd's Bush Empire in London, UK.

Already part of Hillsong Church since 2005, Fraser joined the Australian church's worship band—Hillsong Worship—where she participated under her married name, Brooke Ligertwood, after her 2008 marriage. The first album she was included on was the 2006 album Mighty to Save, on which she co-wrote "None But Jesus" from United We Stand, released in 2006. Her last live album with the band was the 2010 album A Beautiful Exchange, after which Fraser left Hillsong Worship.

=== 2010−2015: Flags and Brutal Romantic ===
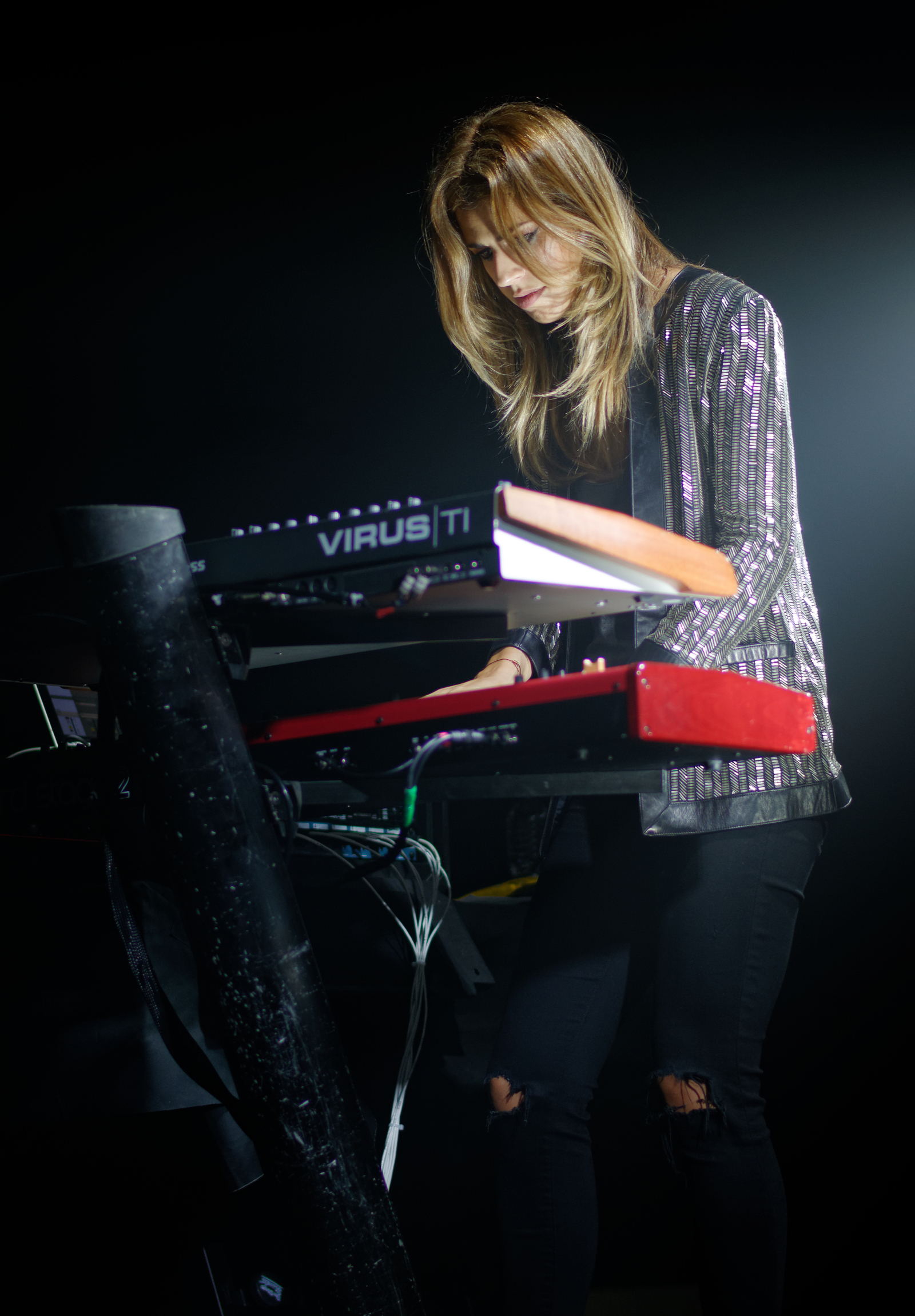
Fraser performing in 2015 on the Brutal Romantic Tour.

Flags was recorded at East West Studios in Hollywood in mid 2010 and released on 12 October 2010, in New Zealand, Australia and North America. Fraser celebrated with sold-out tours in all territories. Flags reached No. 1 on the New Zealand album chart, No. 3 in Australia and entered at No. 59 on the Billboard 200 in the US. Flags has been certified Gold in Australia and 3× Platinum in New Zealand, where it was also the sixth-highest-selling album of 2010. The first single, "Something in the Water", achieved extensive radio success across the globe; notably, it received BBC Radio 2 A-list rotation in the top 10 in Germany, Austria, Switzerland, Italy, Finland and Belgium and is a gold single in Germany and Italy. The single achieved double platinum sales in NZ where it spent 21 weeks in the 2010 singles chart. Flags was released in July 2011 in Europe and debuted in the album charts at No. 6 in Germany, No. 33 in Austria and No. 24 in Switzerland. A month after its release, Flags remained in the German top twenty at No. 13 and "Something in the Water" on the singles charts at No. 8. Flags was released in October 2011 in Hungary and reached No. 15 on the national album chart by the second week of release. Flags was later released in Sweden, Norway, Denmark and Finland on 7 November 2011.

In its review of Flags, Glide Magazine said: "Brooke Fraser's third release, Flags, is a wonder. From the stunning lyrical imagery throughout to the impressive guest vocalists who join her (Cary Brothers, Jon Foreman and Aqualung among them), from Fraser's ethereal and breathy performances to the wide-ranging soundscapes, this record is drenched in beauty and stands as one of the more remarkable achievements of 2010."

After the release of Flags, Fraser signed a recording contract with Vagrant Records and started recording her fourth studio album. On 13 August 2014, Fraser released a "taster track" titled "Psychosocial" on SoundCloud. The song marked a shift in musical direction for Fraser, as she moved from more acoustic and singer-songwriter based tunes to more electronic sounds. Her single "Kings and Queens" went to radio on 22 September 2014 and was available for digital download on 26 September 2014. On 1 October, she announced her fourth studio album, Brutal Romantic, would follow in November. The album was released in Australia, New Zealand and South East Asia on 14 November 2014 and in North America on 17 November 2014. The album was produced by Fraser and David Kosten, except the track "Magical Machine" which was produced by Fraser, Kosten and Dan Wilson. In September 2015, Fraser performed a song titled "Team, Ball, Player, Thing" as a part of a charity supergroup #KiwisCureBatten. It was an official supporters' song of the All Blacks in the 2015 Rugby World Cup. It was also in aid of research into Batten disease via the New Zealand charity Cure Kids. It was released as a single on 11 September 2015. The day after it was released, the single debuted at No. 6 on the New Zealand Top 40 chart.

=== 2016−present: Second tenure with Hillsong Worship and solo worship albums ===
In 2016, she released the single "Therapy", which featured on her first compilation album, A Sides, released in November. This was followed by B Sides, in November 2018.

The 2016 live album Let There Be Light marked Fraser's return and her first live recording with Hillsong Worship since her departure in 2010. She co-wrote and sang lead vocals on the song "What a Beautiful Name" for the 2016 live album. At the 2018 Grammy Awards, the group won the Best Contemporary Christian Music Performance/Song award for "What a Beautiful Name". Billboard ranked the song as the top Christian Song of 2017 and third of the 2010s decade.

On 25 February 2022, she released Seven, her first live solo album, her first solo work since rejoining Hillsong Worship, and the first to be released under her married name, Brooke Ligertwood. On 28 April 2023, she released Siete, an EP consisting of 5 songs from Seven in Spanish. Her first studio album in nine years, titled Eight, was released on 20 October 2023, once again under her married name. Ligertwood revealed during the album's press cycle that she had stepped away from Hillsong again following several controversies and major changes within the church.

On 22 June 2024, she performed with the Auckland Philharmonia Orchestra for a one-time concert at the Spark Arena in Auckland; the concert was sold out and became the venue's largest crowd ever for a solo New Zealand act. However, during this show, she thanked music executive Paul McKessar, which attracted controversy due to his involvement in the #MeTooNZ probe on harassment and abuse in the New Zealand music industry. In August, she announced she will perform the same show at the Sydney Opera House with the Sydney Symphony Orchestra. That same month, she released Infinity, a live album featuring songs from Eight, with production and music by Benjamin Tennikoff. On November 21, 2025, she released another live album of her 2024 performance with the Auckland Philharmonia.

On 9 February 2026, Ligertwood announced her sixth album, Eat, which was released on 15 May. She released two promo singles in advance of its release: "Even Death on the Cross!" with Abbie Gamboa on 18 February, and "The Water" with Victory Boyd on 20 March.

== Personal life ==
After the success of her first album, Fraser moved to Sydney in 2004. On 17 March 2008, she married Scott Ligertwood, in Sydney. They moved to Los Angeles in 2010. She continued to perform under her maiden name "Brooke Fraser" for her solo career until the release of her live album Seven in 2022, at which point she began simultaneously using her married name "Brooke Ligertwood."

In March 2015, Fraser announced she was pregnant with their first child. Their daughter was born on 18 September 2015. Fraser currently lives in Los Angeles, where she was occasionally on the Sunday worship team at the Hillsong Church Los Angeles campus prior to her departure from the church. Another daughter was born on 10 July 2017.

== Artistry and influences ==
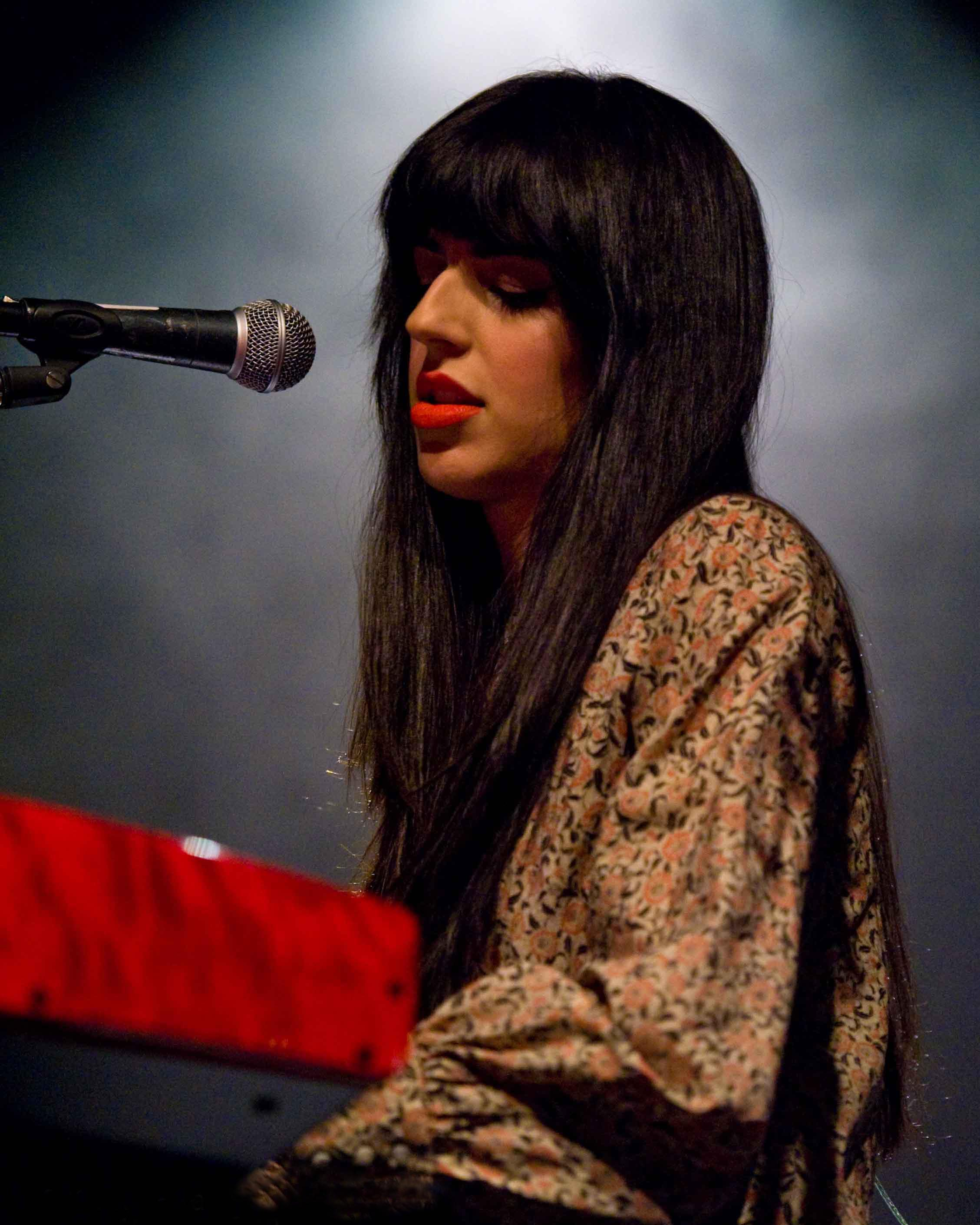
Fraser performing in 2010.

Fraser's music tends to contain Christian themes and imagery while "her work with Hillsong allowed her to fully express her faith." Her genres include folk-pop with more recent pop elements incorporated into her work. Fraser's image as an artist is described as a "dark-haired, wide-eyed, eternally innocent Christian who sang of happy feet, being thrown a lifeline and things in the water." As an artist who writes her songs, she is described as "fast-paced and diligent; she throws herself into everything," fashion and lyric-wise.

In a Newshub interview, Fraser noted that "pop music is music that everyone can connect to and get on board with, and that's really the same with worship music. Ideally, it's music that you can come into a church and sing, whether you're a mechanic or a singer or a doctor or a stay-at-home mum, that you would find a connection point in those lyrics which uplifts you, connects you to God and helps you on your own journey". She has also cited New Zealand artist Lorde as an influence.

== Philanthropy ==
In late 2010 whilst on tour in the US promoting her third album Flags, Fraser, in conjunction with charity: water, ran a birthday campaign asking her fans to donate $27 in honour of her 27th birthday. The goal was to raise $50,000 to build clean water wells in Ethiopia. Fraser has worked with World Vision as an Artist Associate since 2001. She has visited Cambodia and Tanzania with World Vision, the Philippines with Opportunity International and independently travelled to Rwanda in June 2005, in June 2006 as part of charity event "Hope Rwanda", and in May 2007 when she filmed the music video for the song "Albertine" off her second studio album of the same name. Fraser was one of many New Zealand performers to work alongside New Zealand comedy band Flight of the Conchords in their 2012 New Zealand Red Nose Day charity song "Feel Inside (And Stuff Like That)".

== Discography ==
As Brooke Fraser

- What to Do with Daylight (2003)
- Albertine (2006)
- Flags (2010)
- Brutal Romantic (2014)

As Brooke Ligertwood

- Eight (2023)
- Eat (2026)

== Awards and nominations ==
=== Grammy Awards ===
| Year | Nominee/work | Award | Result |
|---|---|---|---|
| 2018 | "What a Beautiful Name" | Best Contemporary Christian Music Performance/Song | Won |

=== GMA Dove Awards ===
| Year | Nominee / work | Award | Result | Ref. |
|---|---|---|---|---|
| 2009 | Herself | Female Vocalist of the Year | Nominated | |
| 2022 | Seven | Worship Album of the Year | Nominated | |
| 2022 | Seven | Recorded Music Packaging of the Year | Nominated | |
| 2023 | "Honey in the Rock" (with Brandon Lake) | Worship Recorded Song of the Year | Nominated | |
| 2024 | Eight | Worship Album of the Year | Nominated | |
| 2025 | Infinity | Long Form Music Video of the Year | Nominated | |

=== Vodafone Pacific Music Awards ===
| Year | Nominee/work | Award | Result |
|---|---|---|---|
| 2013 | "Something in the Water" | New Zealand On Air Radio Airplay | Nominated |
| 2015 | "Kings & Queens" | New Zealand On Air Radio Airplay | Won |
| 2018 | "Therapy" | New Zealand On Air Radio Airplay | Won |

=== APRA Awards (New Zealand) ===
| Year | Nominee / work | Award | Result |
|---|---|---|---|
| 2004 | "Better" | Most Performed Work in New Zealand | Won |
| 2007 | "Deciphering Me" | Most Performed Work in New Zealand | Won |
| 2007 | "Deciphering Me" | APRA Silver Scroll | Nominated |
| 2007 | "Albertine" | APRA Silver Scroll | Won |
| 2011 | "Something in the Water" (shared with Scott Ligertwood) | Most Performed Work in New Zealand | Won |
| 2013 | "Something in the Water" (shared with Scott Ligertwood) | Most Performed Work in New Zealand | Won |
| 2013 | "Something in the Water" (shared with Scott Ligertwood) | Most Performed Work Overseas | Won |

=== New Zealand Music Awards ===
| Year | Category | Result |
|---|---|---|
| 2004 | People's Choice Award | Nominated |
| 2004 | Album of the Year (What to Do with Daylight) | Nominated |
| 2004 | Best Female Solo Artist | Won |
| 2004 | Breakthrough Artist of the Year | Won |
| 2004 | Single of the Year ("Lifeline") | Nominated |
| 2004 | Songwriter of the Year | Nominated |
| 2004 | People's Choice Award | Nominated |
| 2007 | Album of the Year (Albertine) | Nominated |
| 2007 | Best Female Solo Artist | Nominated |
| 2007 | Highest Selling Album (Albertine) | Won |
| 2007 | Single of the Year ("Deciphering Me") | Nominated |
| 2007 | Airplay Record of the Year ("Deciphering Me") | Won |
| 2009 | International Achievement Award | Won |
| 2011 | Album of the Year (Flags) | Nominated |
| 2011 | Best Pop Album (Flags) | Won |
| 2011 | Best Female Solo Artist | Nominated |
| 2011 | Single of the Year ("Something in the Water") | Won |
| 2011 | People's Choice Award | Won |
| 2015 | Best Female Solo Artist (Brutal Romantic) | Nominated |
| 2018 | International Achievement Award (for winning Grammy for "What a Beautiful Name") | Won |
