= Eternity (newspaper) =

Australian Christian newspaper

- Editor: Rebecca Abbott
- Country: Australia
- Website: eternitynews.com.au
- ISSN: 1837-8447

Eternity is an Australian Christian media service that produces a bi-annual magazine and a daily online publication. Published by Bible Society Australia, Eternity is interdenominational, and is not affiliated with any particular church.

After decades as Art Director at Fairfax Media, John Sandeman, a Sydney Anglican, and Christian entrepreneur David Maegraith founded Eternity. Having become part of the Bible Society Australia group in 2011, Eternity shifted away from news reporting in 2022, under new leadership.

The Eternity magazine is printed bi-annually with a circulation of about 100,000, while Eternity online publishes articles daily.

The online format has seven main content categories:

1. Australia
2. Faith stories
3. Good news
4. In depth
5. Opinion
6. Culture
7. World

== History ==
In 2009, David Maegraith and John Sandeman discussed a desire to address what they perceived as unfair mainstream media coverage of Christianity, as well as disunity within the Christian church. They founded Eternity, expressing an intention to emphasise high-quality, neutral journalism to benefit a Christian audience in Australia. A first draft of the paper was called Australian Christian. The name was changed by Sandeman shortly after to Eternity, a word notably used by Sydney folklore legend Arthur Stace.

In May 2011, Eternity became part of the Bible Society Australia, a broad-based interdenominational organisation that is a member of the worldwide United Bible Societies. Sandeman subsequently moved from owning Eternity to being an employee of the Bible Society Australia, with Rebecca Abbott becoming Head of Eternity in August 2022. This change was part of a broader shift in focus away from news reporting and towards faith-based media.

In February 2024, the Bible Society Australia announced that Eternity News would cease operations on 30 April 2024.

Notable contributors to Eternity included John Dickson, Colin Buchanan, Amy Orr-Ewing, Tim Costello, Christine Caine, Iona Rossely, John Anderson, Gordon Menzies, Nick Hawkes, John Swinton, Stephen McAlpine, Kanishka Raffel, Broughton Knox, Mike Bird, John Harris, Sam Chan, Dominic Steele, Graham Joseph Hill, and Philip Jensen.

Notable organisations which collaborated with Eternity included Bible Society Australia, Voice of the Martyrs Australia, Centre for Public Christianity, Scots College, Youthworks, Australian Christian Lobby, British and Foreign Bible Society, Open Doors Australia and United Bible Societies.

== In Media ==
=== Australian Broadcasting Corporation (ABC) ===
In October 2011, ABC radio's John Cleary interviewed Sandeman about the publication's first year.

In Julia Baird's 2017 article, "Christian conference attendees walk out after speakers suggest women should grow their hair long, defer to men at work" for the ABC, she referenced Anne Lim's Eternity article "When cutting your hair can be an ungodly act" which reported on a controversial meeting at a Christian women's conference.

In a 2019 article entitled "When you don’t know that you don’t know: Academic misrepresentation of Australian Pentecostalism" author Mark Jennings references John Harrison's Eternity article "Why the media targets Pentecostals."

=== The Sydney Morning Herald ===
In May 2018, Michael Kozial quoted Sydney law professor Patrick Parkinson's comments from an Eternity article "Religious Freedom Push Revs Up: Expectations set about Canberra response while Christian Democrats submit bill in NSW", in an article for The Sydney Morning Herald.

In July 2022, Peter FitzSimons quoted then Investment NSW chief executive Amy Brown's comments from an Eternity article.

=== The Guardian ===
In 2019, in an article entitled "Scott Morrison calls for ‘more love’ as he prays for Australia at Hillsong conference", Katharine Murphy referenced an Eternity article entitled "Scott Morrison prays for Australia at Hillsong Conference".

=== 60 Minutes ===
In 2021, 60 Minutes responded to Eternity's article, "Hillsong is red meat for media: what 60 minutes is serving up this week" which described the actions of a Hillsong employee as a "story of a drunken encounter and an unpleasant touch". 60 Minutes responded, "If you want to know what's wrong with Hillsong, you need only look at the completely tone-deaf way the megachurch and its supporters have responded to our investigation broadcast on Sunday night".
