= The King Is Still the King =

Studio album by Chris Tomlin
- Released: September 26, 2025
- Length: 55:13
- Labels: Evergreen Music Recordings; Capitol Christian Music Group
- Producers: Jonathan Smith; Chris Tomlin; Jordan Mohilowski; Casey Moore; Matt Gilder; Cozy

Chris Tomlin chronology
Always (2022)	The King Is Still the King (2025)	Holy Forever - Christmas Songs of Worship (2025)

Singles from The King Is Still the King
- 1. "The First Hymn" Released: April 11, 2025; 2. "How Good It Is" Released: September 26, 2025

Professional ratings
Review scores
Source	Rating
Today's Christian Entertainment	5/5 stars

The King Is Still the King is the fourteenth studio album by American Christian contemporary musician Chris Tomlin, released on September 26, 2025, via Evergreen Music Recordings and Capitol Christian Music Group. The album features guest appearances from Phil Wickham, Ben Fielding, Aodhán King, Jamie MacDonald, and CalledOut Music. It was produced by Jonathan Smith, Tomlin, Jordan Mohilowski, Casey Moore, Matt Gilder, and Cozi.

The album was supported by the release of "The First Hymn" as a single, with "You Are My King (Amazing Love)", "How Good It Is", "Doesn't He", and "Jesus Saves" as promotional singles. 'The First Hymn" peaked at No. 49 on the Billboard Hot Christian Songs chart. "How Good It Is" peaked at No. 38 on the Hot Christian Songs and No. 20 on Christian Airplay. "Doesn't He" peaked at No. 49 on the Hot Christian Songs.

== Writing and development ==
Tomlin explained the inspiration behind the album, saying,

If I could pick one word to describe this album, it would be celebration. Scripture talks so often about creation praising God—rivers clap their hands and mountains sing. I wanted to bring that into the album using the sounds God created—wind, thunder, rain, waves and birds. This record is full of sounds that celebrate who God is. Not just in lyrics–but in how it feels. My hope is the whole record brings joy and life–lifting people up in their spirit.

The King Is Still the King was Tomlin's first album in three years, making it his longest time between album release dates.

== Release and promotion ==
The lead single released from The King Is Still the King was "The First Hymn", featuring Ben Fielding, on April 11, 2025. The song was supported by a live video and a lyric video. "The First Hymn" covers the song P.Oxy 1786, which, written in the 3rd century AD, is credited as being the earliest known Christian Greek hymn to contain both lyrics and musical notation. The single's tracklist featured both a studio recording, as well as a live recording, from the Dickies Arena in Fort Worth, Texas. "The First Hymn" was featured in a documentary of the same name, directed by Dr. John Dickson, which studied the origins of P.Oxy 1786. It premiered at Biola University on April 14, 2025, and was made available digitally in August 2025. Tomlin spoke about the song, saying,

This song reminds us of the history of our faith—it’s not a trend, it’s not a fad, and it’s certainly not 30 minutes old. It’s ancient, it’s historical, and it’s eternal. The worship of the one true God—the giver of all good gifts—has echoed through generations.

On April 16, 2025, as the first of Spotify's Easter Singles Campaign, Tomlin released a cover of Billy James Foote's "You Are My King (Amazing Love)".

On July 10, 2025, Tomlin appeared on Fox & Friends, where he announced the song "How Good It Is" and the release date for The King Is Still the King. The following day, "How Good It Is" was officially released and the album was made available for preorder. It was supported by lyric video. "How Good It Is" became Tomlin's biggest single debut since his 2020 collaboration with Thomas Rhett and Florida Georgia Line on "Thank You Lord". On July 27, the song appeared on Fox & Friends, premiering to Television audiences.

"Doesn't He" was released as a promotional single on August 8, 2025, supported by a lyric video. Tomlin spoke about the song's meaning, saying,

There's only one name that is worthy of all worship; worthy of all praise. When we sing "Doesn't He deserve it all" we are responding to the goodness of God, the greatness of God, the holiness of God. "Doesn’t He" was the very first song written for the upcoming album. It's felt special from the start… I am excited that the moment has come to release it!

The album's final predecessor, "Jesus Saves", was released on September 5, 2025, supported by a lyric video.

== Accolades ==
Year	Organization	Nominee / work	Category	Result	Ref.
2025	We Love Awards	"How Good It Is"	Worship Song of the Year	Nominated	
2026	K-Love Fan Awards	"How Good It Is"	Worship Song of the Year	Nominated	
2026	Dove Awards	"How Good It Is"	Worship Song of the Year	Pending	

Year-end lists
Publication	Accolade	Rank	Ref.
New Release Today	Top 10 Worship Albums of 2025	Unordered	

== Commercial performance ==
Within its first week, The King Is Still the King became Tomlin's biggest global streaming debut of his career.

With the release of the album, it debuted in the UK at No. 12 on the OCC Official Christian & Gospel Albums chart and No. 42 on the Official Album Downloads chart. In the US, it debuted at No. 8 on the Top Christian Albums chart, No. 41 on the Top Album Sales chart, and No. 36 on the Top Current Album Sales chart.

=== Singles and charted songs ===
Tomlin and Fielding earned an entry into the Hot Christian Songs chart with "The First Hymn", which achieved a peak of No. 49. The song remained on the chart for one week. "Doesn't He" did the same. "How Good It Is" peaked at No. 38 on the Hot Christian Songs, No. 20 on Christian Airplay, and No. 26 on Christian AC Airplay.

With the album's release, the track "Still the King" entered the Hot Christian Songs at No. 23.

== Track listing ==
All tracks are produced by Chris Tomlin and Jonathan Smith except where noted

No.	Title	Writer(s)	Producer(s)	Length
1.	"How Good It Is"	Tomlin; Jess Cates; Jordan Mohilowski	Tomlin; Smith; Mohilowski	3:51
2.	"👑🙌"	Tomlin; Cates; Mohilowski		1:10
3.	"Doesn't He"	Tomlin; Cates; Patrick Mayberry		4:15
4.	"Still the King"	Colton Price; Cates; Kaelob Mecum		4:46
5.	"Rivers of Joy"	Tomlin; Jason Ingram; Pat Barrett		4:02
6.	"He Has Done Great Things" (with Phil Wickham)	Tomlin; Brian Johnson; Ingram; Jonas Myrin; Phil Wickham		4:59
7.	"👑✝️"	Tomlin; Br. Johnson; Ingram; Myrin; Wickham		1:38
8.	"Jesus Saves"	Tomlin; Ben Fielding; Chris Davenport; Ingram; Wickham		3:08
9.	"Help My Unbelief"	Tomlin; Ben Johnson; KK Johnson		3:30
10.	"You Are My King (Amazing Love)"	Billy James Foote	Casey Moore; Matt Gilder	4:14
11.	"👑🧎"	Gilder	Tomlin; Cozi	1:27
12.	"That's Who He Is"	Tomlin; Jeff Pardo; Smith		3:37
13.	"The First Hymn" (with Ben Fielding)	Traditional	Smith	4:11
14.	"Coming Soon"	Tomlin; Davenport; Nick Herbert		4:14
15.	"👑🐦‍⬛"	Tomlin; Smith		1:11
16.	"My Fathers World" (with Aodhán King, Jamie MacDonald, and CalledOut Music)	Tomlin; Fielding; Ingram; Reuben Morgan		5:00
Total length:				55:13

== Charts ==
Chart performance for The King Is Still the King
Chart (2025)	Peak position
UK Album Downloads (Official Charts)	42
UK Christian & Gospel Albums (OCC)	12
US Top Christian Albums (Billboard)	8
US Top Album Sales (Billboard)	41

== Release history ==
Release history and formats for The King is Still the King
Region	Date	Format(s)	Label(s)	Ref.
Various	September 26, 2025	CD; LP; digital download; streaming	Evergreen Music Recordings; Capitol Christian Music Group	
