= John W. Harris =

John W. Harris may refer to:

- John Woods Harris (1810–1887), Attorney General of Texas
- John Harris (creolist)
- John W. Harris, founder of National Beta Club
