= Oxyrhynchus hymn =

Manuscript of an early Christian Greek hymn

The Oxyrhynchus hymn (or P. Oxy. XV 1786) is the earliest known manuscript of a Christian Greek hymn to contain both lyrics and musical notation. The papyrus on which the hymn was written dates from around the end of the 3rd century AD. It is on Papyrus 1786 of the Oxyrhynchus papyri, originally kept at the Papyrology Rooms of the Sackler Library, Oxford, which was renamed the Bodleian Art, Archaeology and Ancient World Library in 2022. The manuscript was discovered in 1918 in Oxyrhynchus, Egypt, and later published in 1922.

== Description ==
The lyrics of the Oxyrhynchus hymn were written in Greek, and poetically invoke silence for the praise of the Father, Son, and Holy Spirit (i.e. cosmic stillness, a motif of ancient Greek hymnody). Historically, the hymn demonstrates Greek civilizational continuity where erudite Christian Greeks used and accepted the musical notation of their classical Greek predecessors.

The music is written in Greek vocal notation. It is entirely diatonic, with an ambitus of exactly an octave from F to F an octave above, and a final nominally on G (assuming a key signature without sharps or flats). The notation is Hypolydian, and employs the rhythmic symbols macron (diseme), leimma + macron, stigme, hyphen, and colon. The text is largely set syllabically, with a few short melismas. The hymn's meter is essentially anapaestic, though there are some irregularities.

The Oxyrhynchus hymn is the only surviving fragment of notated Christian Greek music from the first four hundred years of the Christian period, although historian and musician Kenneth Levy has argued that the Sanctus melody best preserved in the Western medieval Requiem mass dates from around the fourth century. Modern recordings of the hymn have been included on a number of releases of Ancient Greek music. In 2025, the hymn was adapted into a contemporary worship song as part of The First Hymn, a documentary project led by Australian historian John Dickson, with musicians Chris Tomlin and Ben Fielding creating a modern arrangement based on the original text and melody. The arrangement appeared on Tomlin's The King Is Still the King (2025).

== Text ==
The Phos Hilaron and the Oxyrhynchus hymn constitute the earliest extant Christian Greek hymn texts reasonably certain to have been used in Christian worship that are neither drawn from the Bible nor modeled on Biblical passages.

Papyrus Oxyrhynchus 1786
Original text (Cosgrove 2011)	English translation
1. ... ]ὁμοῦ, πᾶσαι τε Θεοῦ λόγιμοι δε …? ι … ? [… ὅσα κ[όσμος]; 2. ... o]ὐ τὰν ἠῶ σιγάτω, μηδ᾿ ἄστρα φαεσφόρα χ[..]δε–; 3. [σ]θων [ἐκ]λειπ[όντων] ῥ[ιπαὶ πνοιῶν, πηγαὶ] ποταμῶν ῥοθίων πᾶσαι. ὑμνούντων δ᾿ἡμῶν 4. [π]ατέρα χυἱὸν χἅγιον πνεῦμα, πᾶσαι δυνάμεις ἐπιφωνούντων ἀμὴν ἀμήν, κράτος αἶνος 5. [ἀεὶ καὶ δόξα Θεῷ] δ[ωτ]ῆ[ρι] μόνω[ι] [πάν]των ἀγαθῶν, ἀμὴν ἀμήν.	1. . . . together all the eminent ones of God. . .; 2. . . . night] nor day (?) Let it/them be silent. Let the luminous stars not [. . .], 3. . . . [Let the rushings of winds, the sources] of all surging rivers [cease]. While we hymn 4. Father and Son and Holy Spirit, let all the powers answer, "Amen, amen, Strength, praise, 5. [and glory forever to God], the sole giver of all good things. Amen, amen."

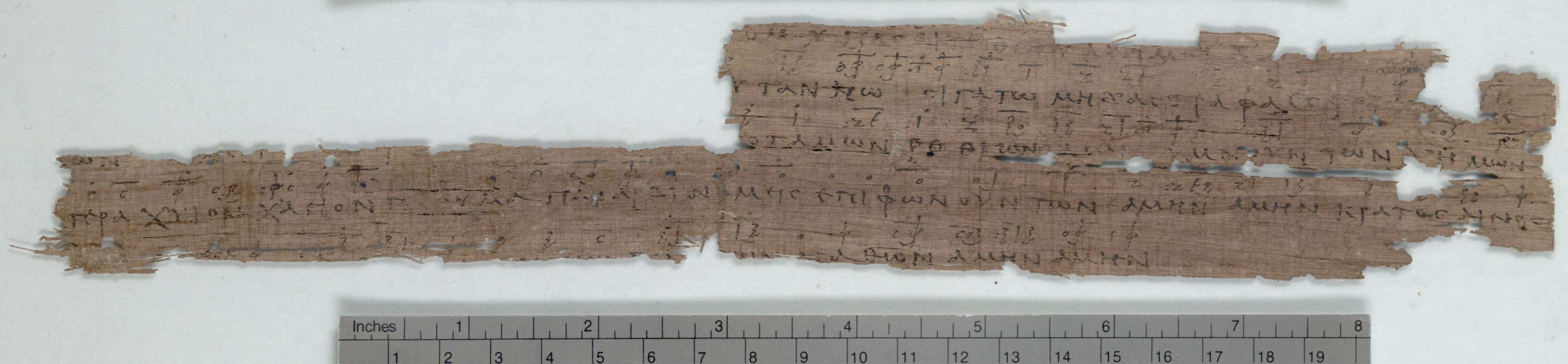
Fragment of Oxyrhynchus hymn, 29.6 x 4.8–5.0 cm.

== Sources ==
- Cosgrove, Charles H. 2011. An Ancient Christian Hymn with Musical Notation: Papyrus Oxyrhynchus 1786: Text and Commentary. Studien und Texte zu Antike und Christentum 65. Tübingen: Mohr Siebeck. ISBN 978-3-16-150923-0.
- Grenfell, Bernard Pyne, and Arthur Surridge Hunt. 1922. "1786. Christian Hymn with Musical Notation". The Oxyrhynchus Papyri 15, nos. 1778–1828:21–25. London: Egypt Exploration Fund.
- Lang, Paul Henry. 1941. Music in Western Civilization. New York and London: W. W. Norton & Company, Inc. ISBN 978-0-393-04074-6.
- Levy, Kenneth. 1958–62. "The Byzantine Sanctus and its Modal Tradition in East and West". Annales Musicologiques 6:7–67.
- McKinnon, James W. 2001. "Christian Church, Music of the Early. §II: Special Issues, 8. The Musical Character of Early Christian Song". The New Grove Dictionary of Music and Musicians, second edition, edited by Stanley Sadie and John Tyrrell. London: Macmillan Publishers. ISBN 9780333608005.
- Pöhlmann, Egert, and Martin L. West. 2001. Documents of Ancient Greek Music: The Extant Melodies and Fragments. Oxford: Clarendon Press. ISBN 0-19-815223-X.
- Smith, John Arthur. 2011. Music in Ancient Judaism and Early Christianity. Farnham: Ashgate Publishing, Ltd.; Burlington: Ashgate Publishing, Inc. ISBN 978-1-4094-9423-2.
- West, Martin Litchfield. 1992. Ancient Greek Music. Oxford: Clarendon Press. ISBN 0-19-814975-1.

== Discography ==
- Ensemble Kérylos, a music group directed by scholar Annie Bélis dedicated to the recreation of ancient Greek and Roman music. 1996. "Hymne chrétienne d'Oxyrhynchus", Musique de l'Antiquité grecque. K617.069.
- Atrium Musicæ de Madrid, Gregorio Paniagua. 1979. "Christian Hymn of Oxyrhynchus." Musique de la Grèce Antique. Harmonia Mundi (France) HMA 1901015. Arles: Harmonia Mundi.
- Christodoulos Halaris. 1992. "Hymn to the Holy Trinity". Music of Ancient Greece. Orata ORANGM 2013. [Greece]: Orata Ltd.
- Ensemble De Organographia. 1995. "Christian hymn, Anonymous (3rd c. AD) Oxyrhynchus papyrus 1786." Music of the Ancient Greeks. Pandourion PRCD1001. Oregon City: Pandourion Records.
