= Ben Fielding =

Australian worship songwriter

Ben Fielding is an Australian contemporary Christian music and worship songwriter, and one of several worship leaders emerging from the Hillsong Church Worship team. He has written numerous globally sung worship songs, including Grammy- and Dove Award-winning works, and has collaborated with international artists like Chris Tomlin and Brandon Lake.

== Early life and education ==
Fielding grew up in Melbourne, Australia, where he became involved in church music from a young age. He later became part of Hillsong Church’s worship ministry in Sydney.

== Career ==
=== Hillsong Worship and shaping global worship ===
The 2017 book, The Hillsong Movement Examined, by Tanya Riches and Tom Wagner, describes Hillsong Church as "one of the most influential authors of evangelical worship", as music written by their worship team has been sung in churches internationally over the past three decades. Among the contributors to Hillsong’s global influence in worship music is Fielding, whose songwriting has helped shape the sound of contemporary Christian worship. As noted by theologian Lester Ruth, Hillsong's music — including Fielding’s work — has become a “sonic global brand” of evangelical Christianity, unifying diverse denominations through accessible and theologically resonant lyrics.

Fielding has written over 200 published worship songs throughout his career.

Fielding co-wrote the song "Mighty to Save" with Reuben Morgan. It won the Worship Song of the Year award at the 40th GMA Dove Awards and was also nominated for Song of the Year.

In 2014, Fielding co-wrote the worship song "This I Believe (The Creed)," a musical adaptation of the Apostles' Creed, at the request of John Dickson, director of the Centre for Public Christianity, who wanted a modern expression of a foundational Christian statement to inspire unity across denominations. The song combines a second-person address in the verses with a chorus that affirms belief in the triune God, reflecting mainstream Protestant liturgy and transmitting centuries of Christian theology in a form accessible to contemporary congregations. Fielding emphasized the importance of the song's "translatability" in shaping its structure and lyrical approach, with the intent to create a unifying worship anthem that could be adopted globally across different languages and traditions.

In 2016, he co-wrote "What a Beautiful Name" with Brooke Ligertwood. The song won the 2018 Grammy Award for Best Contemporary Christian Music Performance/Song and Song of the Year at the 2017 Dove Awards.

Fielding co-wrote "Who You Say I Am" with Morgan, which won the 2019 Dove Award for Worship Song of the Year.

=== Independent projects and collaborations ===
In 2025, Fielding co-wrote and released The First Hymn with Chris Tomlin, a contemporary worship adaptation of the Oxyrhynchus Hymn—the oldest known Christian hymn with both lyrics and musical notation, dating back to the 3rd century. The song is featured prominently in the feature-length documentary The First Hymn, directed by Australian historian John Dickson, which traces the ancient melody’s journey from its desert origins to its modern revival. The film culminates in a live concert performance of the newly arranged hymn. The song was released globally on 11 April 2025.

Fielding is a member of CXMMXNS, a collective of worship leaders and songwriters exploring the intersection of music, theology, and community. The movement was highlighted in a 2024 Relevant Magazine feature on the evolving global worship landscape.

In 2023, Fielding co-wrote the song "Praise You Anywhere" with Brandon Lake.

=== Appearances and speaking engagements ===
Fielding was a featured speaker at the 2025 WOR/TH Worship Conference in Sydney, hosted by Matt Redman, which also included artists such as Darlene Zschech, and CityAlight.

He has also contributed to academic conversations around modern worship songwriting, including participation in the 2023 Worship Leader Research colloquium exploring integrated songwriting networks.

In 2026, Fielding was part of the lineup for OneSydney: Together in Christ, a large-scale worship event held at the Sydney Opera House that brought together Christians from multiple denominations for a night of prayer, unity and music. The event featured both Australian and international artists, including Dami Im, Stan Walker, Matt Maher, Reuben Morgan and the St Andrew’s Cathedral Choir, alongside Fielding in both matinee and evening concerts.

== Legacy and influence ==
According to CCLI, songs co-written by Fielding have consistently ranked in the top 10 most-used worship songs across churches worldwide.

Fielding’s contributions have been the subject of theological analysis and worship studies, including academic work by Daniel Thornton, who notes Fielding’s influence on the “ecclesial and cultural embeddedness” of contemporary worship.

The story behind Fielding’s most well-known composition, "What a Beautiful Name", was profiled in Premier Christianity, exploring its theological depth and worship resonance.
