= Kenneth Levy =

American musicologist (1927–2013)

- Levy, c. 1954
- Born: Kenneth Jay Levy; February 26, 1927; New York, New York, US
- Died: August 15, 2013 (aged 86); Skillman, New Jersey, US
- Known for: Scholarship on early Christian and Byzantine music

Academic background
- Education: Queens College (BA); Princeton University (MA, PhD)

Academic work
- Discipline: Medieval and Byzantine music
- Institutions: Princeton University; Brandeis University

Kenneth Jay Levy (February 26, 1927 – August 15, 2013) was an American musicologist who specialized in Medieval, Renaissance and Byzantine music. He was described as "among the world’s authorities on early Christian and Byzantine music".

== Life and career ==
Kenneth Jay Levy was born on February 26, 1927, in New York, New York. After service in World War II, Levy attended Queens College, City University of New York, and received a Bachelor of Arts in 1947, having studied music history under Curt Sachs and music theory under the composer Karol Rathaus. He received both a Master of Fine Arts and PhD at Princeton University, studying under Oliver Strunk and Erich Hertzmann. His PhD thesis concerned the chansons of late Renaissance composer Claude Le Jeune. After a brief stint teaching at Princeton from 1952 to 1954, Levy taught at Brandeis University for over a decade. He received a Guggenheim Fellowship in 1954. In 1966 he returned to Princeton, teaching there until his retirement in 1995. Levy died on August 15, 2013, in Skillman, New Jersey, US. Following his death, the American Institute of Musicology set up the 'Kenneth Levy Fund' to fund studies relating to medieval music.

Levy specialized in a variety of topics concerning Medieval, Renaissance and Byzantine music. In particular, an obituary from Princeton described him as "among the world’s authorities on early Christian and Byzantine music". In Grove Music Online, Paula Higgins notes that he "investigated Byzantine and Western chant, including the Old Roman, Ambrosian, Beneventan and Ravennate repertories, and by careful comparison he has been able to draw tentative conclusions regarding the relationships of certain Western chants to Byzantine models and between modal patterns and performing practices common to East and West." He also wrote on the chanson in the 16th century.

He was the dedicatee of a festschrift in 2001, The Study of Medieval Chant: Paths and Bridges, East and West.

== Selected writings ==
Books

- Levy, Kenneth (1955). The Chansons of Claude Le Jeune (PhD). Princeton University. OCLC 4202533.
- —— (1983). Music: a Listener's Introduction. New York: Harper & Row.
- —— (1998). Gregorian Chant and the Carolingians. Princeton: Princeton University Press.

Articles

- Levy, Kenneth (Autumn 1951). "New Material on the Early Motet in England: A Report on Princeton Ms. Garrett 119". Journal of the American Musicological Society. 4 (3): 220–239. doi:10.2307/829622. JSTOR 829622.
- —— (2000). "A New Look at Old Roman Chant". Early Music History. 19: 81–104. JSTOR 853859.
- —— (2001). "A New Look at Old Roman Chant - II". Early Music History. 20: 173–197. JSTOR 853791.
- —— (2016) [2001]. "Byzantine Chant". Grove Music Online. Revised by Christian Troelsgård. Oxford: Oxford University Press. doi:10.1093/gmo/9781561592630.article.04494. ISBN 978-1-56159-263-0. (subscription, Wikilibrary access, or UK public library membership required)
