= Roseville railway station, Sydney =

Railway station in Sydney, New South Wales, Australia

Roseville
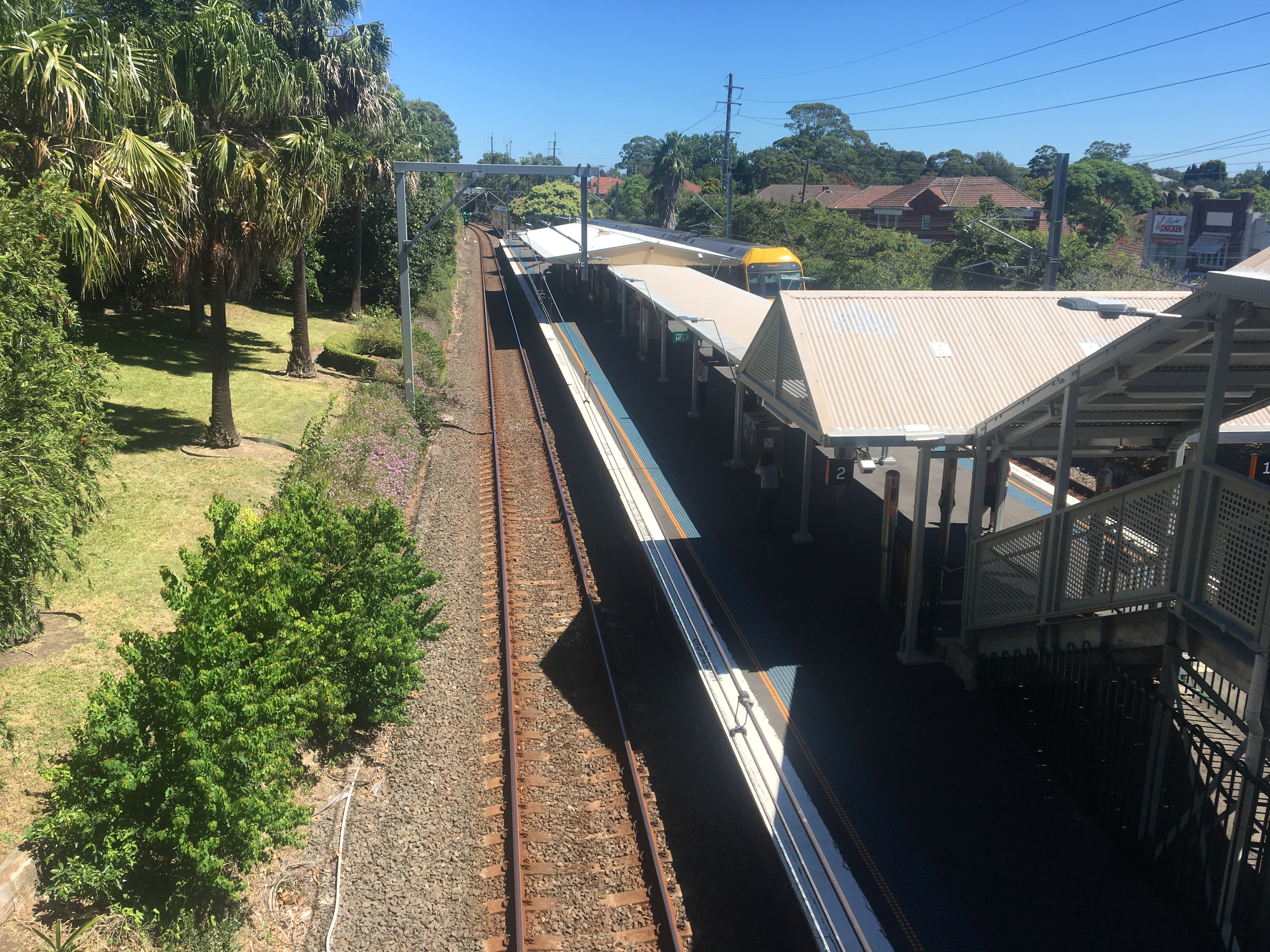
- Station platforms, buildings and stairs viewed from footbridge, February 2019

General information
- Location: Hill Street, Roseville; New South Wales, Australia
- Coordinates: 33°47′03″S 151°10′38″E
- Elevation: 111 metres (364 ft)
- Owner: Transport Asset Manager of NSW
- Operator: Sydney Trains
- Line: North Shore
- Distance: 13.27 km (8.25 mi) from Central
- Platforms: 2 (1 island)
- Tracks: 2
- Connections: Bus

Construction
- Structure type: Ground
- Accessible: Yes

Other information
- Status: Staffed
- Station code: RVL
- Website: Transport for NSW

History
- Opened: 1 January 1890 (136 years ago)
- Electrified: Yes; 1927
- Former names: Rossville (1890)

Passengers
- 2025: 1,479,907 (year); 4,055 (daily) (Sydney Trains)
- Rank: 96

Services
Preceding station	Sydney Trains	Following station
Chatswood towards Emu Plains or Richmond	North Shore & Western Line	Lindfield towards Berowra
Chatswood via Strathfield towards Hornsby	Northern Line	Lindfield towards Gordon
Location

Roseville railway station is a suburban railway station located on the North Shore line, serving the Sydney suburb of Roseville. It is served by Sydney Trains T1 North Shore & Western Line and T9 Northern Line services. The station is known for its surrounding extensive station gardens.

== History ==
Roseville station opened on 1 January 1890 as Rossville when the North Shore line opened from Hornsby to St Leonards. It was renamed Roseville on 1 September 1890. It was named after a stone cottage on the site of the station in an orangery and was demolished when the railway came.

Soon after its opening, Jill Devor, a local, was struck by lightning before falling onto the track on 6 September 1896, where she clipped an incoming carriage. Miraculously, she survived with minimal injuries.

In November 2021 an upgrade to the station was complete which included two new lifts and new toilet facilities.

== Services ==
=== Platforms ===
Platform	Line	Stopping pattern	Notes
1	North Shore & Western Line	Services to Penrith, Emu Plains & Richmond	
1	Northern Line (Sydney)	Services to Epping & Hornsby via Strathfield	
2	North Shore & Western Line	services to Hornsby, Lindfield, Gordon & Berowra	
2	Northern Line (Sydney)	Services to Gordon	

=== Transport links ===
CDC NSW operates two bus routes via Roseville station, under contract to Transport for NSW:

- 558: Lindfield to Chatswood station
- 565: Macquarie Park to Chatswood station

Roseville station is served by one NightRide route:

- N90: Hornsby station to Town Hall station
