= Roseville, New South Wales =

Roseville
- Suburb
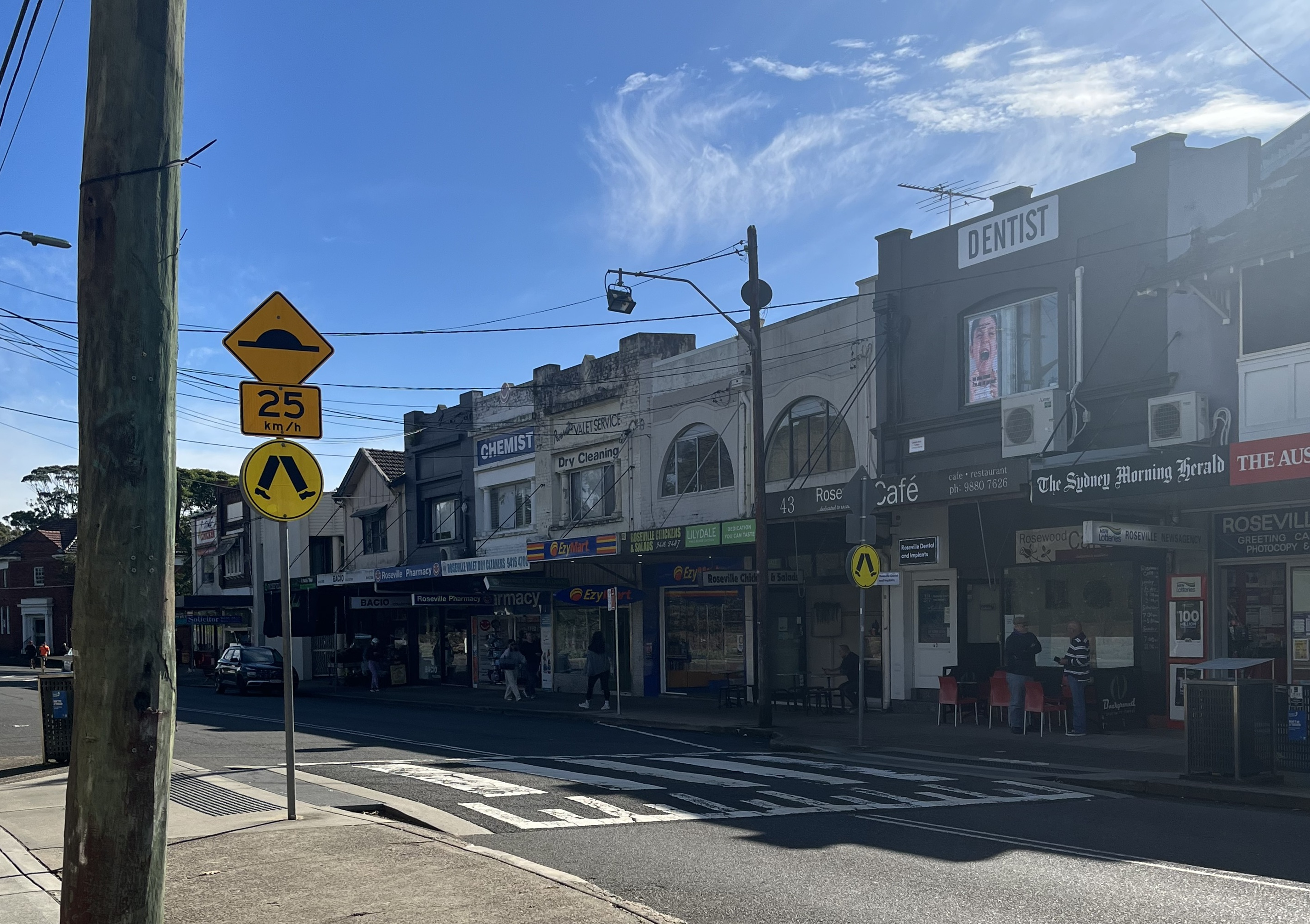
- Hill Street

- Interactive map of Roseville
- Country: Australia
- State: New South Wales
- City: Sydney
- LGAs: Ku-ring-gai Council; City of Willoughby
- Location: 12 km (7.5 mi) north-west of Sydney CBD
- Established: 1814

Government
  - State electorate: Davidson (Ku-ring-gai) Willoughby (City of Willoughby)
  - Federal division: Bradfield

Area
  - Total: 3.4 km^{2} (1.3 sq mi)
- Elevation: 109 m (358 ft)

Population
  - Total: 10,340 (SAL 2021)
- Postcode: 2069
Suburbs around Roseville
Lindfield	East Lindfield	Roseville Chase
Macquarie Park	Roseville	Castle Cove
Chatswood West	Chatswood	North Willoughby

Roseville is a suburb on the North Shore of Sydney in the state of New South Wales, Australia 12 kilometres (7.5 mi) north-west of the Sydney central business district, in the local government areas of Ku-ring-gai and Willoughby. Roseville Chase is a separate suburb to the east.

== History ==
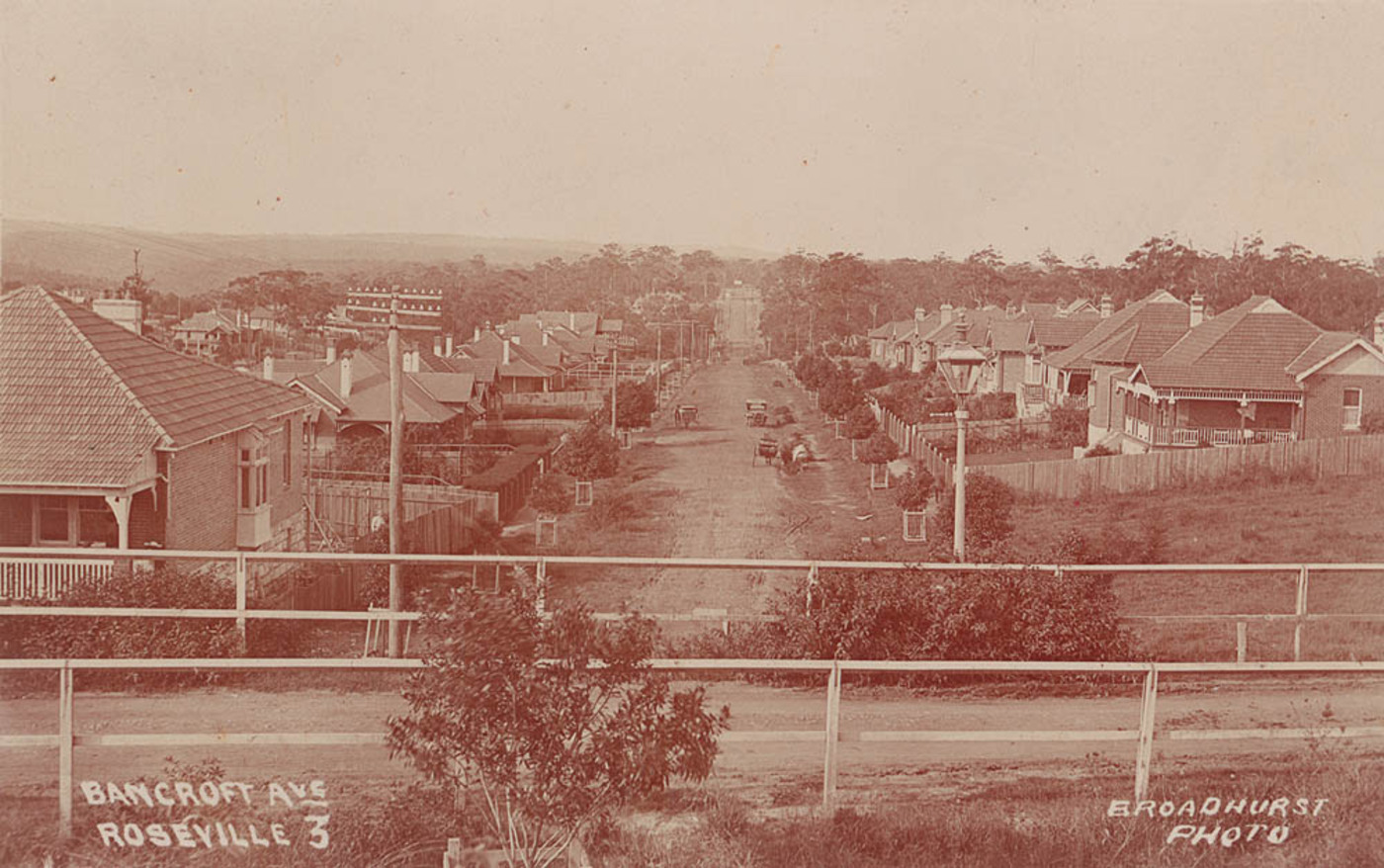
Bancroft Avenue, Roseville, as it appeared in a postcard taken in the period 1900–1927.

William Henry was one of Ku-ring-gai's first European settlers, who used the area for farming. There were a few fruit orchards and market gardens in the area. Other significant settlers were David Mathew, who owned a property called Clanville, and Richard Archbold, who was granted an area of 600 acres (2.4 km^{2}) adjacent to Clanville. Archbold later acquired Clanville and set up an orchard on the property. Archbold's son-in-law had a stone cottage called Rose Villa, which was later demolished to make way for the North Shore railway line. Roseville eventually derived its name from Rose Villa.

Roseville Post Office opened on 8 July 1901. Roseville East Post Office opened on 1 December 1937.

Babbage Road was named for Eden Herschel Babbage (a grandson of Charles Babbage), a retired banker who lived in "Rawhiti" on Clanville Road. Dubbed the "Father of Roseville", he was largely responsible for developing Roseville Park, Davidson Park and Roseville Chase. His brother-in-law, Francis Robert Burton, donated the large pavilion in Roseville Park, following the death in 1913 of brother William Burton, of "Woodlands" on Bancroft Avenue.

The Australian photographer Harold Cazneaux (1878 to 1953) lived for much of his life in a Federation home called "Ambleside", located in Dudley Avenue.

Roseville Golf Club was established on 18 January 1923.

== Suburb ==
Roseville is the southernmost suburb in the municipality of Ku-ring-gai. It is a residential suburb, with medium to low density housing and lies between Findlay Avenue and Ashley Street to the south; and Bayswater Road, Abingdon Road, Chelmsford Avenue and Carnarvon Road to the north. A narrow section of the southernmost area of Roseville, between Ashley Street and Boundary Street, is in the Willoughby municipality. To the east, Roseville is bounded by the waterways of Middle Harbour and Moores Creek, and to the west it is bounded by the Lane Cove National Park. Roseville Chase is surrounded by Babbage Road, Middle Harbour and Moores Creek, and is bisected by Warringah Road, which Roseville Bridge carries over Middle Harbour. The names "Roseville West", "Roseville East" and "East Roseville" are no longer in official use.

=== Architecture ===
Characterised by its lush and leafy roadsides, parks, and gardens; Roseville property prices are considerably higher than the Sydney average. Houses closer to railway station tend to be constructed in the Federation (c. 1890s to 1920s) and Californian bungalow (c. 1920s to 1930s) architectural styles, with the outer areas developed during the 1940s and 1950s in less ornate styles. Since this time, a small portion of these older homes have been demolished and replaced with new development properties. The government is also considering to place Roseville under a Heritage listed area as many of the homes and gardens in and around Roseville are a certain style that dates back to the 1950s. The former Commonwealth Bank is a notable art deco building on the Pacific Highway.

=== Housing opposition ===
A wave of new apartment development is taking place in Roseville.

In May 2025, the Eastside Roseville Action Group started a fundraising campaign to oppose a nine-story residential housing development. The development is composed of four new buildings at 16-24 Lord Street and 21-27 Roseville Avenue. The campaign aimed to raise $100,000 for legal fees. The development includes 250 new homes with 51 affordable homes.

The Eastside Roseville Action Group chair Natasha Sherwood denied that the group was "fighting higher density", but stated "We are worried about inappropriate development". $50,000 was raised to oppose the development, which is a 4-minute walk from Roseville Station. On 31 May 2026, the development was approved.

=== Education ===
Roseville is home to two schools: Roseville Public School (K-6) and Roseville College (K-12).

== Gallery ==
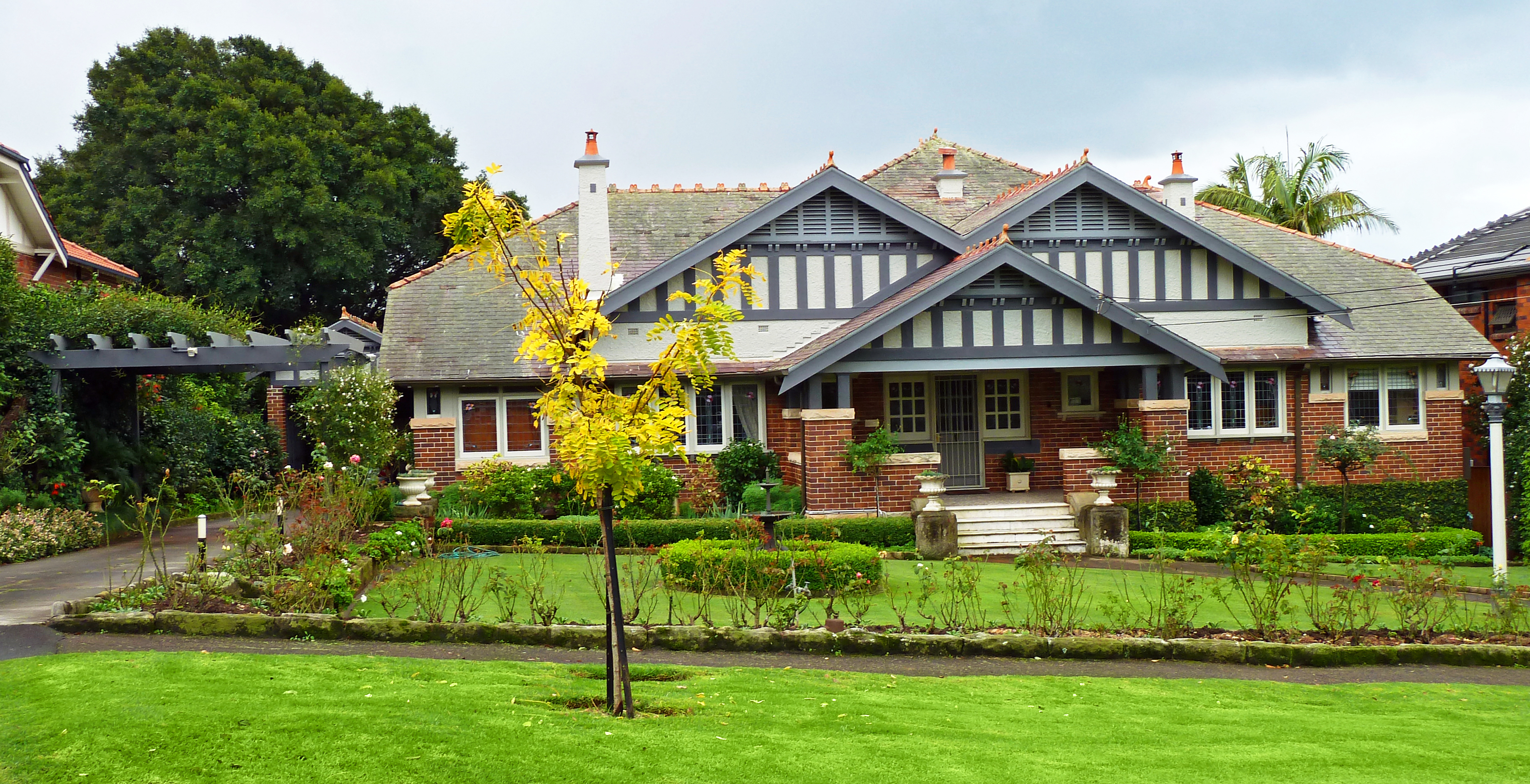
Californian Bungalow (1930s), The Grove

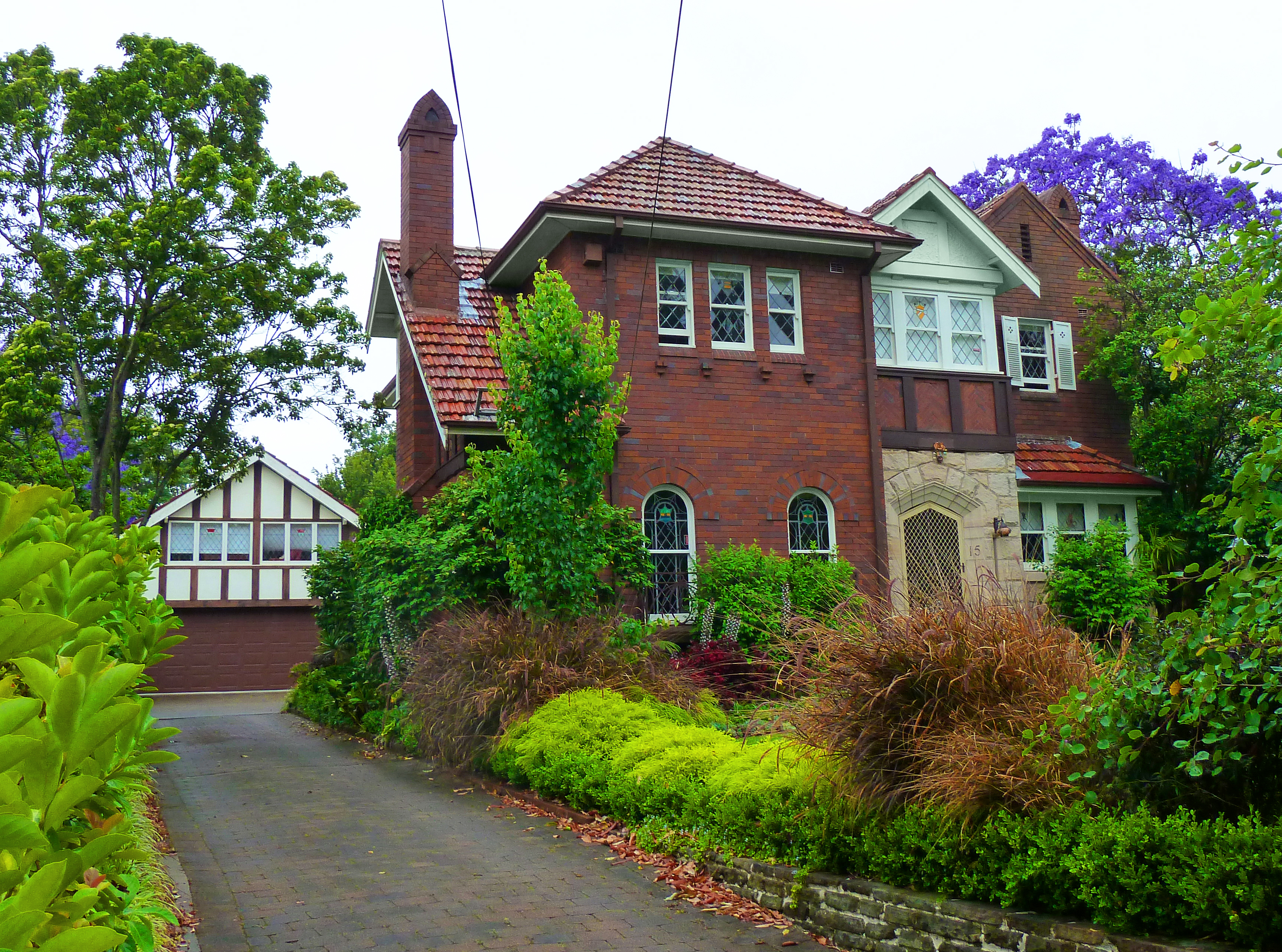
Tudor Revival house (1936), Clermiston Avenue

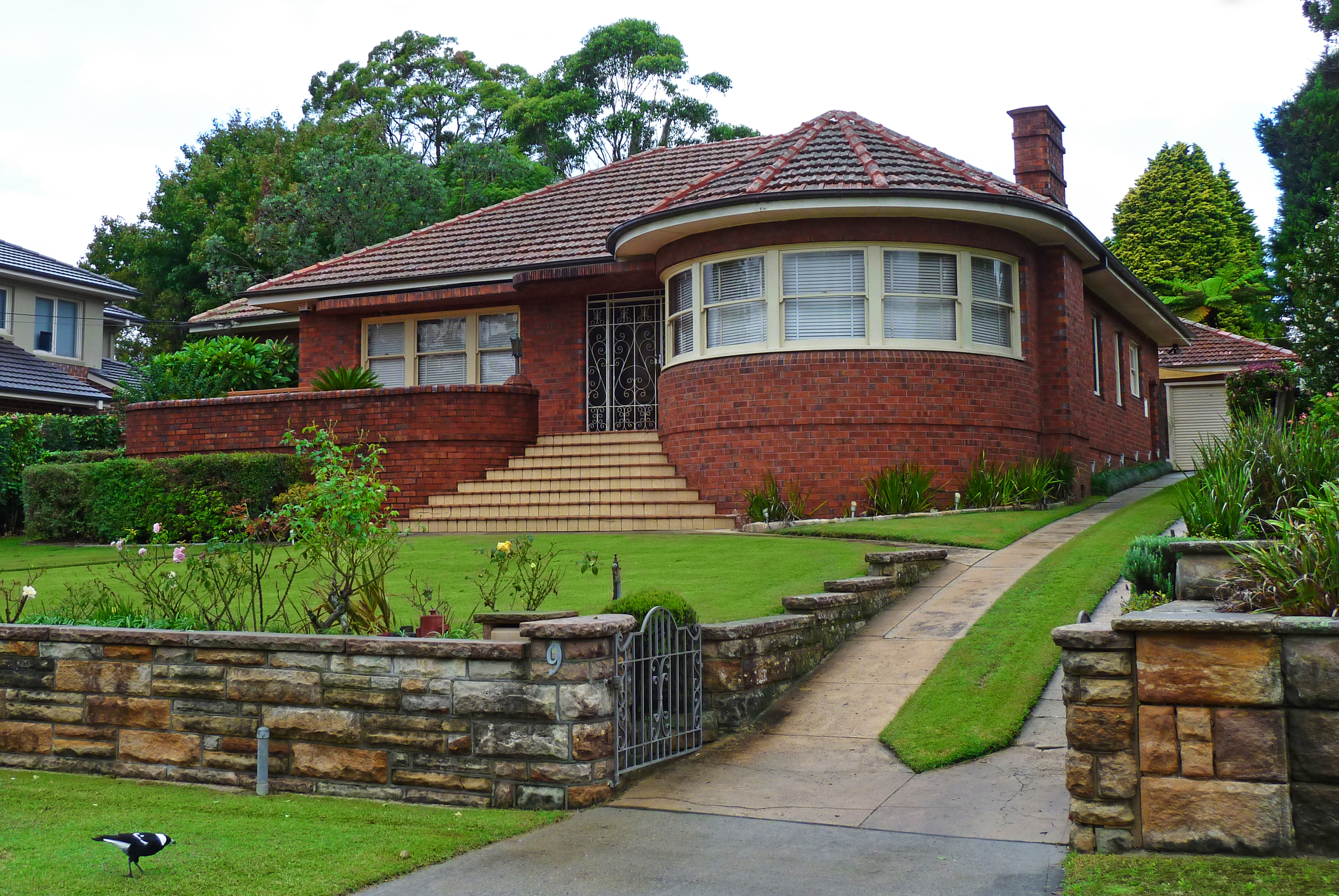
Art Deco house (1950s), Marjorie Street

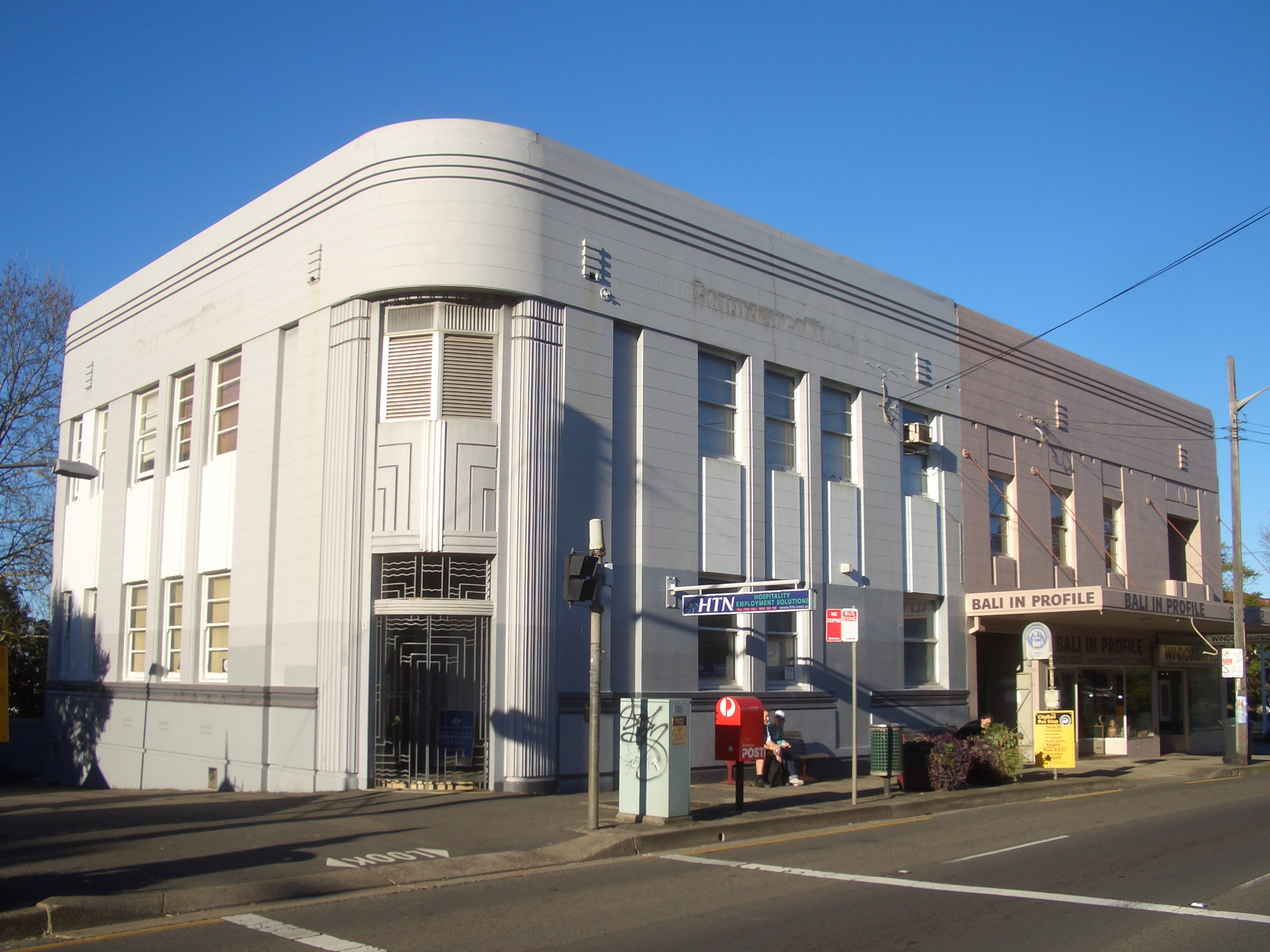
Art Deco building, Pacific Highway

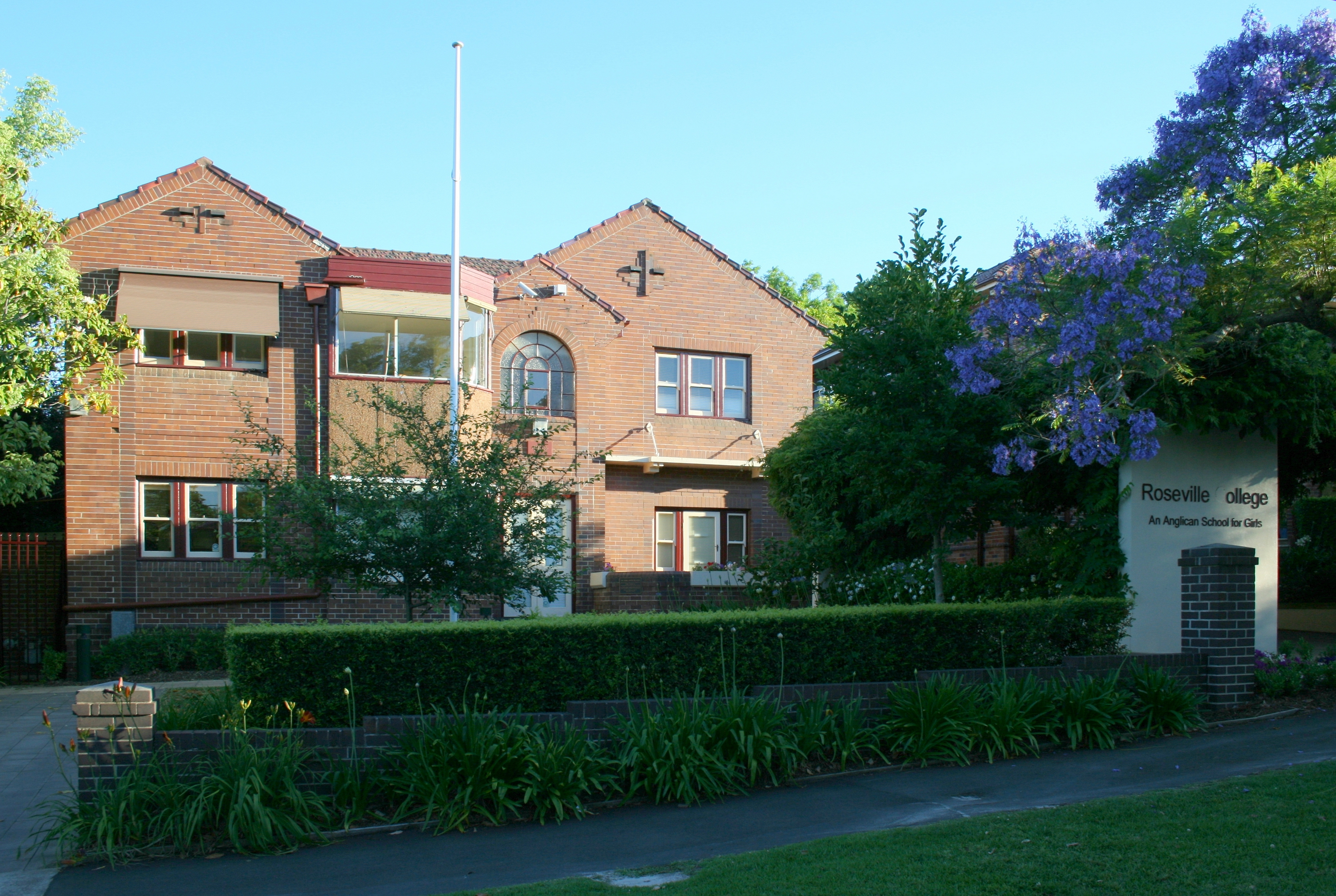
Roseville College

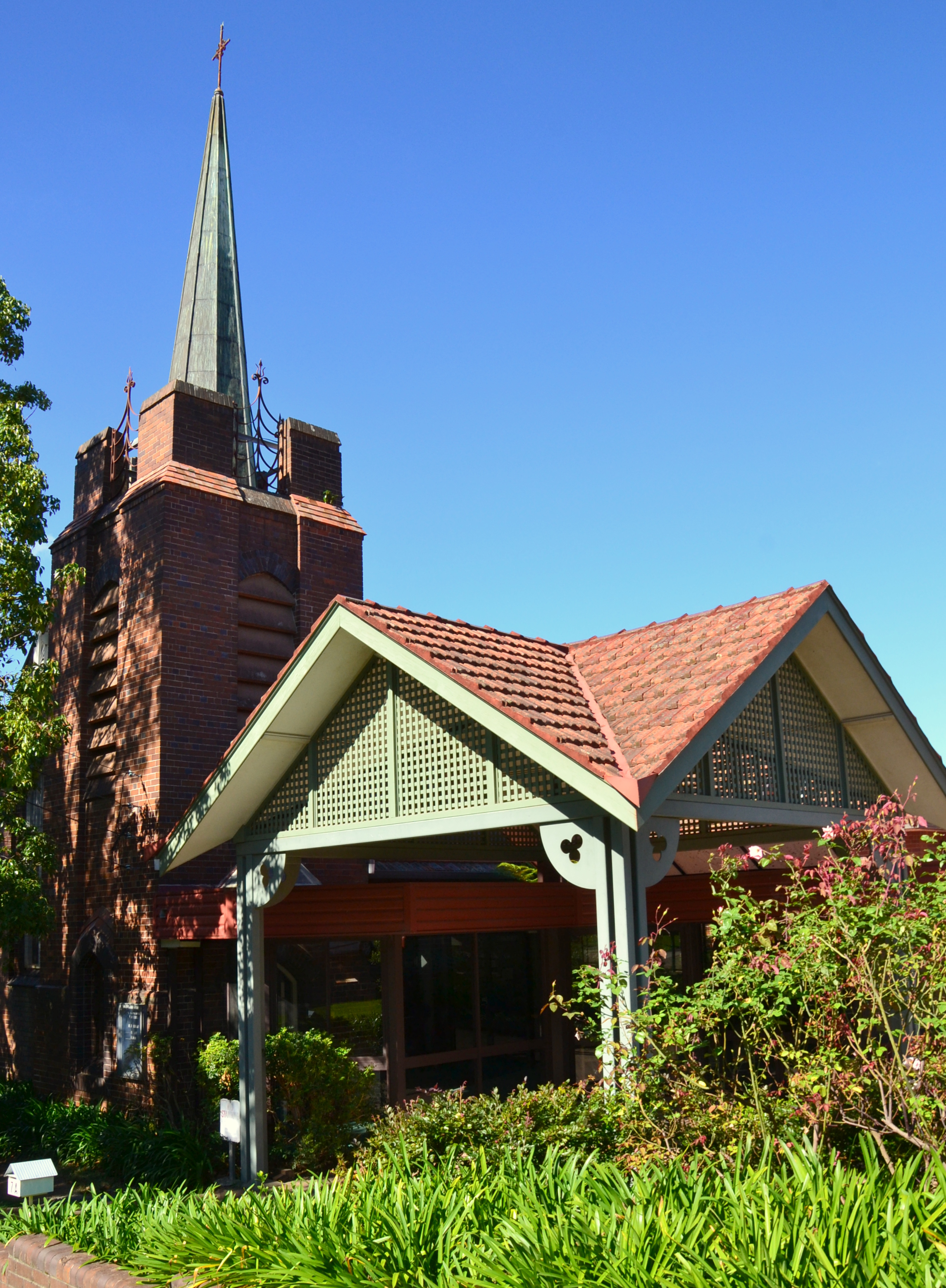
Roseville Uniting Church, Lord Street

== Infrastructure ==
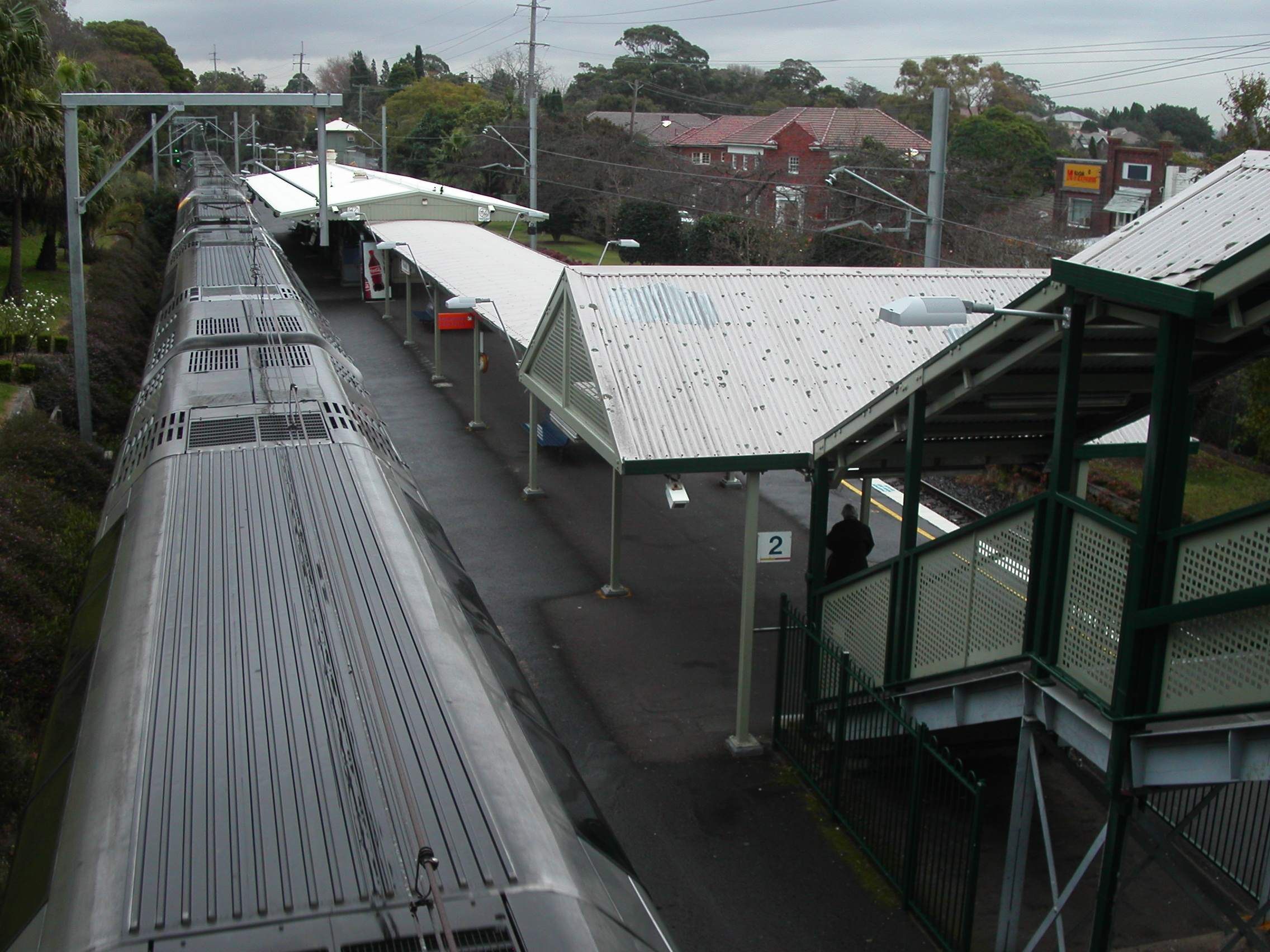
Roseville railway station

Roseville railway station is on the North Shore railway line of the Sydney Trains network. Roseville has a small commercial area beside Roseville railway station on the Pacific Highway and Hill Street.

Roseville has a number of gardens and parks, including Kimo Street Bush, Lower Blue Gum Creek Bush, Loyal Henry Park, Roseville Park, Roseville West Park, and Muston Park.

Schools in the suburb comprise Roseville Public School and Roseville College. Roseville is also home to several churches: St Luke’s (Roseville) Presbyterian Church, Lord Street; Roseville Uniting Church, Lord Street; The Chinese Christian Assembly of Sydney, Moore Street; and St Andrew's Anglican Church. St Andrew's is on the corner of Hill Street and Bancroft Avenue. Its foundation stone was laid by the Archbishop of Sydney, The Most Rev. H. W. K. Mowll, D.D., 27 April 1935, while the rector was W. J. Roberts.

The historic Roseville Cinema on the Pacific Highway it noted for its art deco facade. Originally a hall and community centre, the building later became a church and preparatory school. Its transformation into a cinema began when it became Traynor's Picture Palace in 1919, but did not become a full-scale cinema until 1936. Roseville Cinema was renovated and extended to accommodate two screens in 1995.

== Demographics ==
At the 2021 census, Roseville recorded a population of 10,340. Of these:

Age distribution
The distribution of ages in Roseville was fairly similar to the country as a whole. Roseville residents' median age was 40 years, 2 years over the national median. Children aged under 15 years made up 20.1% of the population (national average is 18.2%) and people aged 65 years and over made up 16.9% of the population (national average is 17.2%).
Ethnic diversity
58.8% of people were born in Australia. The next most common countries of birth were China (without SARs and Taiwan) 9.9%, England 4.3%, Hong Kong 3.1%, New Zealand 1.9% and Malaysia 1.5%. 66.2% of people only spoke English at home. Other languages spoken at home included Mandarin 12.5%, Cantonese 5.9%, Korean 1.5%, Japanese 0.8% and Spanish 0.7%.
Religion
The most common responses for religion were No Religion 41.5%, Catholic 19.4%, Anglican 14.4% an Buddhism 3.2%.
Income
The median weekly household income was $3,200, compared to the national median of $1,746.
Housing
Stand-alone houses accounted for 68.8% of residences, while 28.5% were flats, units or apartments and 2.8% were semi-detached. The average household size was 2.9 people. The median weekly rent was $600, while the national median was much lower at $375.

=== Notable residents ===
- Paul Fletcher (politician), former Federal Minister for Communications, Urban Infrastructure, Cities and the Arts
- At the time of his appointment as Premier of New South Wales in 2011, Barry O'Farrell lived with his family in Roseville, but as of 2012 resided at nearby Turramurra. As a member of parliament, Barry O'Farrell represented the electoral district of Ku-ring-gai.
