= Richard Grellman =

Australian accountant

Richard Grellman AM worked with accounting firm KPMG for 32 years.

He has extensive board experience. He is Chairman of Genworth Mortgage Insurance, IPH Limited and AMP Foundation and Director of The National Health and Medical Research Council Institute for Dementia Research. He has been involved in extensive fundraising for dementia research. He was Executive Chairman of the Association of Surfing Professionals (ASP), now the World Surf League (WSL), for 10 years. Grellman was also a director of AMP for 11 years, and chairman of the NSW Motor Accidents Authority from 1994 to 2009. He was also until recently Chairman of Bible Society Australia.

In 2007, Richard was appointed a member of the Order of Australia for service to the community, particularly through leadership roles with Mission Australia and fundraising with Variety the Children's Charity, and to the finance and insurance sectors.
