= Francis Robert Burton =

Francis Robert Burton (9 September 1840 – 4 July 1915) was a Public Servant in the early days of South Australia and is remembered for his work in improving penal treatment of delinquent boys.

He was born the second son of Dr. Richard Francis Burton (ca.1810 – 24 February 1874), surgeon, of London. In 1852 the family migrated to South Australia and built a home "Bexley" in the Adelaide suburb of Sturt. Dr. Richard Francis Burton, aside from his private medical practice, from 1861 to 1874 provided subsidised medical aid to the poor of the Marion district. He served as Major in both the local and Adelaide regiments of the South Australian Volunteer Military Force, and was chairman of the District Council of Brighton from 1867 to 1873.

Francis Burton was, in his youth, a fine athlete, successfully competing in walking events. He was a prominent cricketer (listed as "Frank R. Burton"), secretary of the Kensington Cricket Club, where his older brother James R. Burton was also a member, and one of the first to be given life membership of the South Australian Cricketing Association. In the late 1850s he joined the Volunteer Regiment. Louisa Harriot Burton (died 22 September 1917), who married Eden Herschel Babbage and settled in Roseville, New South Wales was a sister. His younger brother, William Burton (ca.1848 – 31 May 1913), a banker, was also to settle in Roseville.

In 1865 he joined the Public Service as a clerk in the Crown Lands Office and in the following years was successively transferred to the Immigration Office then the Local Courts. He was appointed Clerk of the Local Court, first in Wallaroo in 1877, Port Adelaide in 1879, then Adelaide on 1 March 1894.

== Youth Penal Reform ==
While at Wallaroo he founded a boys' club but his real involvement with youth welfare began with his Adelaide appointment. At that time, boys were tried in the same court as adult men, and if convicted were sent to a hulk in the Port River. The new Reformatory at Magill was under construction but Burton was convinced boys would less likely to be drawn into a life of crime if they had a separate court and different treatment. He felt that miscreant boys should be tried in a Children's Court, where possible without publication of their names; if found guilty sent for a short time to a reformatory at their parents' expense. These suggestions, made before the Destitute Commission in 1884, with the support of R. Turner, S.M. of Port Adelaide and Sub-inspector Doyle, were accepted and resulted in the formation of the State Children's Department.

In 1888 he received permission to run, at his own expense and in his Glanville home, a trial scheme where recalcitrant boys were treated with respect and good example. The scheme ran for several years and had numerous successes, though as J. A. Hartley observed, this could have been " ... because the boys feel that he takes an interest in their welfare, probably a new experience for many of them."

He retired at age 75 after several years of indifferent health, to his home in Belair, then moved to Roseville, New South Wales, where his brother-in law Eden Herschel Babbage had a home and was deeply involved with the community. He commissioned a large pavilion to be built at Roseville Park, completed in 1915. This was shortly after the death of brother William, of whose will Eden Herschel Babbage and son Francis Eden Babbage were executors.
