= Iain Fenlon =

British musicologist

Iain Alexander Fenlon (born 26 October 1949 in Prestbury, Cheshire) is a British musicologist who specializes in music from 1450–1650; particularly Renaissance and early Baroque music from Italy.

Fenlon was born to Albert Fenlon and Joan Fenlon (née Rainey).

== Academic career ==
He has contributed articles to several music publications and is the author of the books Music and Culture in Late Renaissance Italy (Oxford University Press, 2000), The Ceremonial City: History, Memory and Myth in Renaissance Venice (Yale University Press, 2007). and Piazza San Marco (Harvard University Press, 2009). His writings often explore the relationship between the evolution and development of music and changes within society.

He is currently a fellow and Emeritus Professor of Historical Musicology at King's College of the University of Cambridge, England and serves as the editor of the journal Early Music History. Fenlon is also Honorary Keeper of the Music at the Fitzwilliam Museum.
