= John Dickson (author) =

Australian historian of religion (born 1967)

The Reverend John Dickson
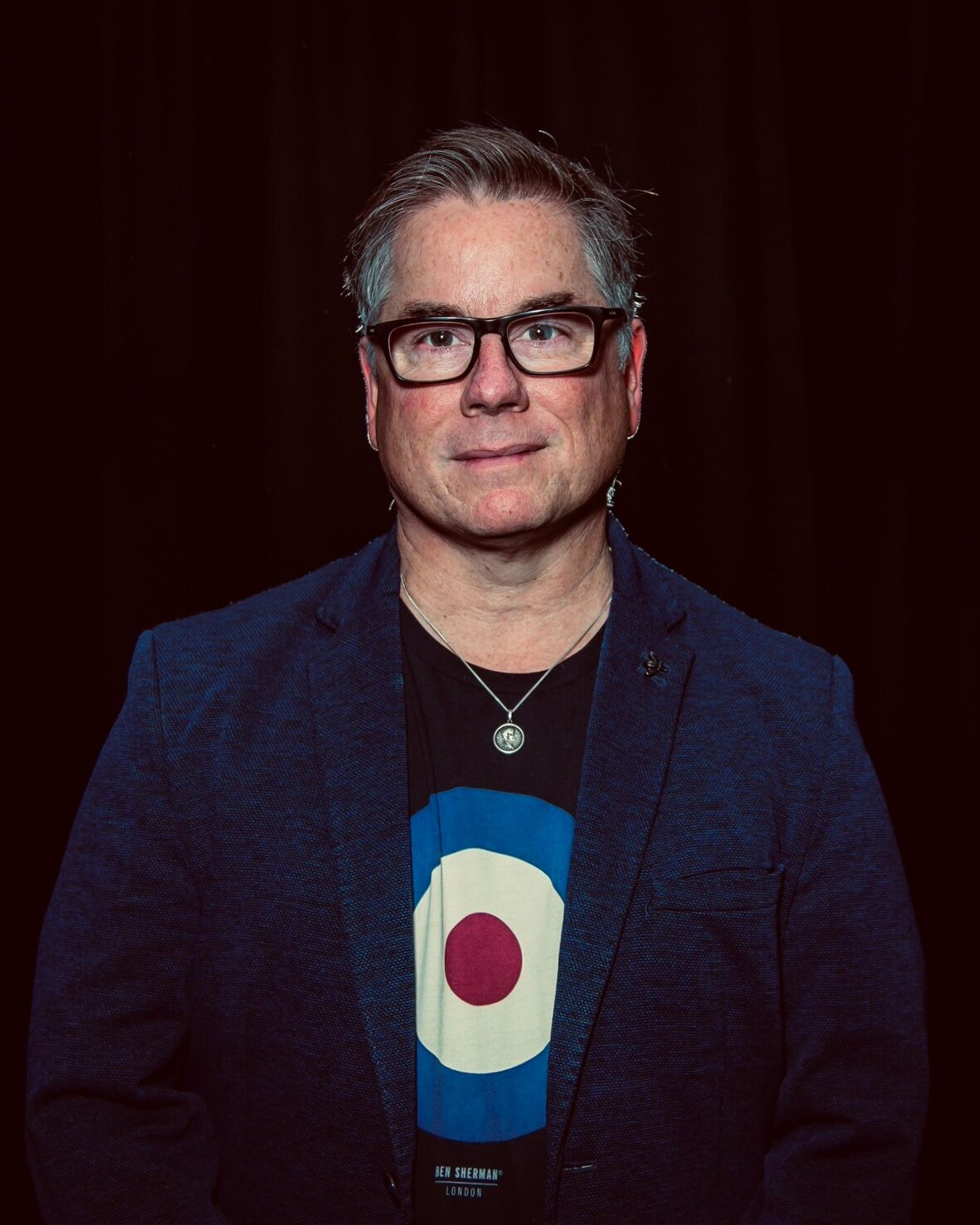
- Born: John Dickson; 1967 (age 58–59); Sydney, New South Wales, Australia
- Education: BTh Moore Theological College, 1995; PhD Macquarie University, 2001
- Alma mater: Macquarie University
- Occupations: Anglican cleric, professor, author, speaker
- Notable work: Bullies and Saints: An Honest Look At the Good and Evil of Christian History
- Spouse: Buff
- Children: 3
- Website: johndickson.org

John Dickson (born 1967) is an Australian author, Anglican cleric and historian of the ancient world, largely focusing on early Christianity and Judaism. Since 2022, he has been a professor at the graduate school of Wheaton College in the United States. Since 2019 he has hosted the Undeceptions podcast.

== Early life ==
Dickson was educated at Mosman High School, Sydney, and grew up in what he describes as "a typical Aussie home". His family was not religious and rarely discussed spiritual matters. Dickson recalls that he had "never been inside a church before he was sixteen".

On 12 October 1976, Dickson's father died in the Indian Airlines Flight 171 disaster at Bombay Airport. Though only nine, the event raised philosophical questions, asking his mother "Why did God let Dad's plane crash?" In high school, Dickson was a "low performer". He attended Christian Scripture Class (SRE) in the pursuit of a "pleasant way to pass half an hour" and to "ask questions to make the volunteers look stupid". By 15, he had become intrigued by the Christian faith, particularly through a teacher who "presented Jesus in an articulate, funny and intelligent way".

Dickson became strongly interested in historical accounts of Jesus Christ, becoming a “fan of Jesus, and then at 16 a follower of Jesus". He became the lead singer of the Christian rock band In The Silence from the late 1980s to the early 90s, playing up to six shows a week, often sharing his new faith.

== Education ==
Dickson began studying at Moore College in 1993, where he later graduated with a first-class honours degree in theology. A PhD in ancient history from Macquarie University followed, with the university making him an honorary fellow in the Department of Ancient History. He also taught a course on the Historical Jesus for the Department of Jewish Studies at the University of Sydney. Dickson later became a visiting academic of the Faculty of Classics, University of Oxford, and in 2019 he was appointed as the Distinguished Fellow and Senior Lecturer in Public Christianity at Ridley College in Melbourne. Following years of touring and performance, Dickson's work became been marked by pastoral ministry, podcasting, academic work and writing.

== Writing and ministry ==
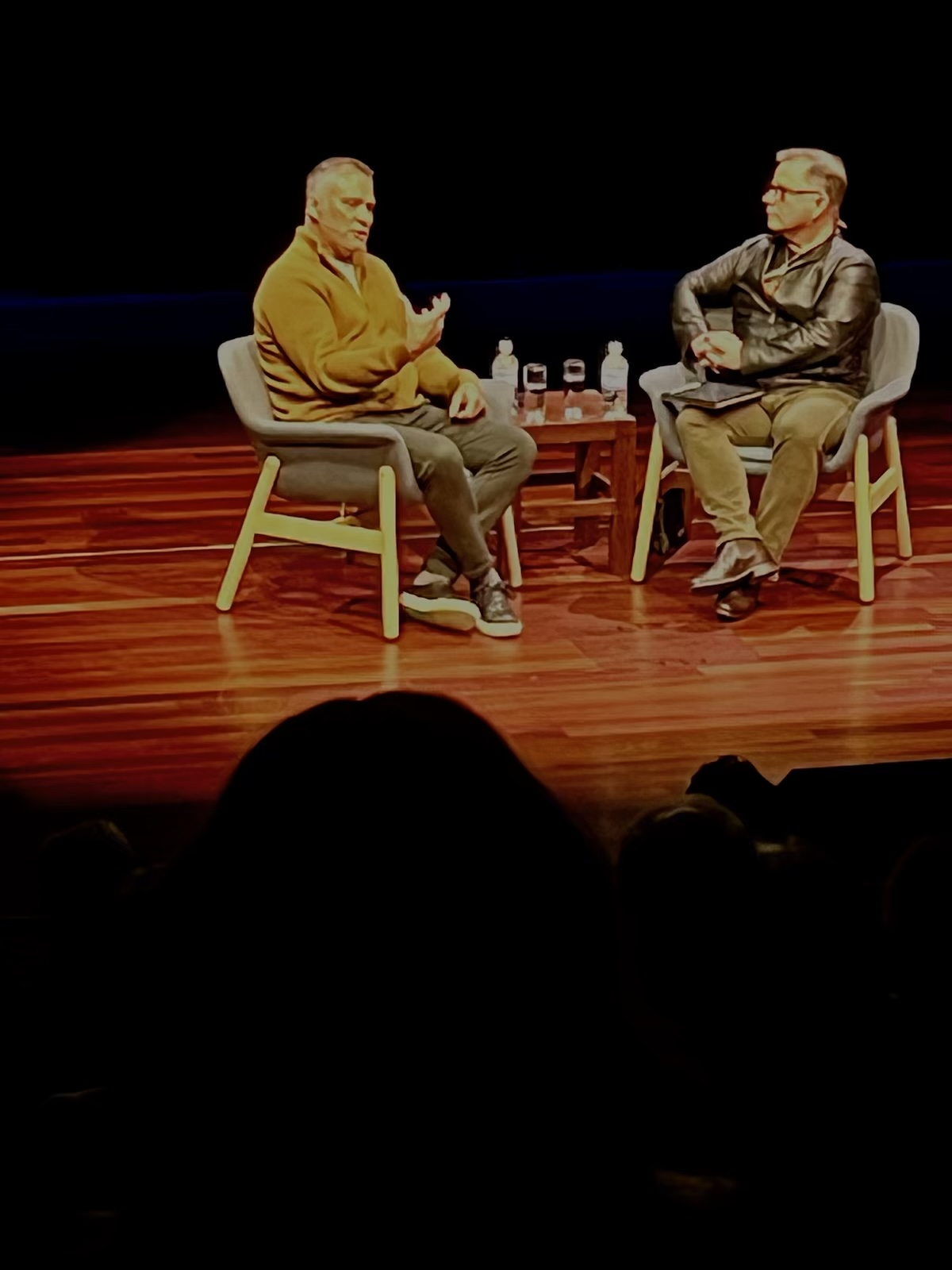
Dickson in a live event with author Stan Grant in 2024

Dickson was ordained in the Anglican Church of Australia, serving in several Sydney churches. He was the senior minister of St Andrew's Anglican Church, Roseville, from 2009 to 2019.

As his pastoral ministry began, Dickson began writing books. Short, evangelistic works at first, such as A Sneaking Suspicion (1995) and Simply Christianity: Beyond Religion. Two of his books, The Christ Files and Life of Jesus, became nationally broadcast documentaries. Dickson's output, described as "prolific", has occasionally been surrounded by controversy, both inside and outside the church.

In 2012, Dickson wrote Hearing Her Voice: A Case for Women Giving Sermons. In it, he argued that 1 Timothy 2:12 ("I do not permit a woman to teach or to have authority over a man") does not mean that women cannot give sermons today, since the "teaching" referred to meant "preserving and laying down the traditions handed on by the apostles", and that does not happen in most sermons today. Matthias Media published a volume of essays in response to Dickson's book: Women, Sermons and the Bible: Essays interacting with John Dickson's Hearing Her Voice.

On 6 May 2015, Dickson's book A Sneaking Suspicion (1995) was banned from state schools by the New South Wales Department of Education and Communities on the basis of a "potential risk to students in the delivery of this material, if not taught sensitively and in an age appropriate manner". The ban was lifted on 18 May 2015.

Dickson frequently produces opinion pieces, such as for the Australian Broadcasting Corporation. In one column, he offered to eat a page out of his Bible "if someone could find a full Professor of Ancient History, Classics or New Testament in any real university in the world who argues that Jesus never lived." As of 2021 he claims his personal copy of the scriptures remains safe. Some of his public statements on the Christian faith involve historical perspectives, such as the contrast between the high value the New Testament holds for empathy, in contrast with the views of antiquity, which saw empathy not as a virtue, but a weakness.

In 2018, Dickson announced that he was stepping down from church ministry to concentrate on public engagement. In 2007, Dickson became the founding director of the Centre for Public Christianity and was there until 2019. In September 2019, he created "Undeceptions", a media and podcast platform. It was the leading religious podcast in Australia, UK and Ireland by 2020. In 2022, Undeceptions became a podcast network with existing podcast With All Due Respect (hosted by Michael Jensen and Megan Powell du Toit), Small Wonders (hosted by Laurel Moffatt) and Delorean Philosophy (hosted by Steve McAlpine). The masthead series also features live events.

Dickson has been a fellow of Macquarie's Department of Ancient History (2004–17), visiting academic of the Faculty of Classics, University of Oxford, in the UK (2017–2020) and is distinguished fellow and Senior Lecturer in Public Christianity at Ridley College, Melbourne, which was announced in March 2019. Wheaton College in Illinois appointed Dickson as its first Jean Kvamme Distinguished Professor of Biblical Evangelism and Distinguished Scholar in Public Christianity in 2022. In this role Dickson has argued for a more respectful approach to engaging the secular world:

"Evangelicals in America (maybe Australia as well?) should understand that we're a minority, "eager dinner guests at someone else's banquet. We are happy ... to share our perspective. But we are always respectful, always humble, because this isn’t our home."

Dickson directed the feature-length documentary The First Hymn, released in 2025. It explores the story of the oldest known Christian hymn, the Oxyrhynchus Hymn, dating back to the 3rd century. The film traces its origins in the Egyptian desert through to its modern revival, culminating in a live concert performance of a newly arranged version of the hymn. The film features Ben Fielding and Chris Tomlin, who co-wrote the adaptation, which was released globally on 11 April 2025. The world premiere of The First Hymn project took place on 14 April the Ethel Lee Auditorium at Biola University in La Mirada, California.

== Books ==
- The Best Kept Secret of Christian Mission: Promoting the Gospel with More Than Our Lips (Zondervan)
- Promoting the Gospel: the Whole of Life for the Cause of Christ (Aquila)
- If I Were God, I'd End All the Pain (Matthias Media, 2001)
- If I Were God, I'd Make Myself Clearer (Matthias Media)
- Simply Christianity: A Modern Guide to the Ancient Faith (Matthias Media) Australian Christian Book of the Year, 2000
- A Spectator's Guide to World Religions: An Introduction to the Big Five (Blue Bottle Books) Australian Christian Book of the Year, 2005
- The Christ Files: How Historians Know What They Know about Jesus (2006, Blue Bottle Books)
- James: the Wisdom of the Brother of Jesus (Aquila, 2006)
- Vital Signs: the Wisdom of James for a Life of Faith (Aquila), with Simon Smart
- 666 and All That: The Truth About the Future (Aquila), with Greg Clarke
- Jesus: A Short Life (Lion, 2008)
- A Spectator's Guide to Jesus: An Introduction to the Man from Nazareth (2008, Blue Bottle Books)
- Mission-Commitment in Ancient Judaism and in the Pauline Communities (Paul Mohr Verlag)
- Life of Jesus: Who He Is and Why He Matters (Zondervan, 2010)
- Hearing Her Voice: A Case for Woman Giving Sermons (Zondervan, 2014)
- A Doubter's Guide to the Bible: Inside History's bestseller for believers and skeptics (Zondervan, 2015)
- A Doubter's Guide to the Ten Commandments: How, for better or worse, our ideas about the good life come from Moses and Jesus (Zondervan, 2016)
- Humilitas: A Lost Key to Life, Love, and Leadership (Zondervan, 2018)
- A Doubter's Guide to Jesus: An introduction to the man from Nazareth for believers and sceptics (Zondervan, 2018)
- Is Jesus History? (Good Book Company, 2019)
- Bullies and Saints. Grand Rapids, Michigan: Zondervan. 2021. ISBN 9780310118367.

Young readers

- A Hell of a Life: From Manger to Megastar (Matthias Media)
- Hanging in There (Matthias Media)
- A Sneaking Suspicion (Matthias Media)
