= Bible Society Australia =

Bible Society Australia is an Australian non-profit, non-denominational, Christian organisation. It is part of a worldwide network of Bible Societies. Bible Society Australia maintains that the Bible is a significant historic text which has deeply influenced society and culture and is still relevant today. The organisation is involved in translating, publishing, and distributing the Christian Bible, from print, to audio, to digital versions. Bible Society Australia is also involved in Bible advocacy, the publication of Bible reading materials, and the provision of literacy support, both in Australia and overseas.

== History ==
The Bible Society is the oldest continually operating organisation in Australia. The Bible Society of Australia was inaugurated at the instigation of Governor Lachlan Macquarie in Sydney on 7 March 1817. Moved by a scarcity of Scriptures in the new colony, Lady Elizabeth Macquarie influenced her husband to form an Auxiliary Bible Society in New South Wales. Governor Lachlan Macquarie called a meeting of "the Magistrates, Clergymen and other inhabitants of Sydney." In a packed court-house, the leading citizens of Sydney established the New South Wales Auxiliary of the British and Foreign Bible Society, as the Bible Society was then known. One of the first acts of the new Auxiliary was to establish a Scripture depository after the discovery that "more than one-third of the dwellings, and nearly three-fifths of the inhabitants who can read, are without a Bible". In the first two years, nearly 3000 Scriptures were distributed. The first new translation published in Australia was a selection of Scripture passages in the Maori language in 1827.

The formal establishment of Bible Society Auxiliaries in each colony occurred between 1817 and 1884. Each Auxiliary operated autonomously in the early days. The Auxiliary Bible Society of Van Diemen's Land (Tasmania) began in 1819. In Melbourne, 'The Auxiliary Bible Society of Australia Felix' was formed in 1840, eleven years before Victoria officially became a colony. Likewise, an Auxiliary was formed in Queensland at Moreton Bay in 1855, while Queensland was still part of NSW.

South Australia opened an Auxiliary in 1845, and later published the first printed Scriptures in an indigenous language, after George Taplin completed his translation of Scripture selections into Narrinyeri (Ngarrindjeri) in 1864. An Auxiliary opened in Western Australia in 1884, soon responding to a huge rise in population due to the Gold Rush.

The French term, 'colporteur' was used by the Bible Society worldwide to describe its individual Bible distributors. Bible Society 'colporteurs' were once found in every corner of Australia, distributing Bibles on foot, horse and cart, and later, bicycles. In the 1800s, colporteurs visited diggers in the goldfields and axemen's remote timber camps. The last of Australia's colporteurs, Rev Harry Cottrell-Dormer, was appointed in 1956. He was allotted half of Australia, an area of four million square kilometres. "My parish," said Harry, "is the Aborigines, the stockmen, the miners, the prospectors, the oilrig crews, the road gangs, the shearers, the fencers, the fettlers and the dam sinkers – all who inhabit the lonely places."

In 1887, the Bible Societies gave a Penny Testament to every schoolchild in Australia to mark the diamond jubilee of the reign of Queen Victoria. During the 1870s and 80s Bibles were also placed by the beds of every hospital in Australia, every prison cell and in every hotel room.

There was a growing recognition of the need to unify the work nationally and in 1908 the first conference of State Secretaries met. In 1925, a National Council was formed which met annually.

During both World Wars the famous khaki New Testament was issued to members of the Australian Army. Likewise the New Testament was issued in two different blues to the Navy and Air Force.

The Bibleman show commenced on radio station 2CH in the 1930s.

In 1957, building operations started on the site of the Memorial Bible House in Canberra, what was to become the national headquarters of the Society in Australia. The National Headquarters were officially opened on 13 February 1960. The land was donated by the Commonwealth of Australia and the building was opened by the Hon. Robert Menzies, Prime Minister of Australia.

The year 1961 marked the 350th anniversary of the Authorised King James Version of the Bible and the publication of the New Testament of the New English Bible. Hundreds of thanksgiving services and celebrations were held across Australia and radio and television was used to promote 'Bible Year'.

A 1967 Australia Post stamp commemorated 150 years of the British and Foreign Bible Society.

A special commissioning service was held in August 1968 for Bible Society's Flying Bibleman, Trevor Booth, who saw the need for an itinerant ministry to serve the remote communities in Western Australia. Flying Bibleman was renamed Flying Bible Ministries in 2013 and continues to distribute Bibles and Scripture resources by plane to an area of over three million square kilometres.

In 2010, the Bible Societies of Australia in each state merged into a single organisation, Bible Society Australia with Greg Clarke named CEO.

In September 2014, Bible Society Australia celebrated the 150th Anniversary of the first Scriptures published in an Aboriginal language, the Ngarrindjeri language of South Australia. Bible Society CEO Greg J Clarke read from the 1864 minutes of the British And Foreign Bible Society South Australian Auxiliary that resolved to print the Bible in Aboriginal languages.

In 2015, the organisation commemorated the centenary of Gallipoli with Their Sacrifice, a multi-media travelling exhibition and website that highlighted the comforting presence of the Bible in times of conflict, from the Boer War to Afghanistan. The campaign was launched by Governor David Hurley at Government House in Sydney.

In 2016, Bible Society Australia acquired Acorn Press, an Australian Christian publisher. It has published a number of notable titles since the acquisition including among others, Mr Eternity: The Story of Arthur Stace, Metanoia and Christ Centred Mindfulness: Connected to Self & God.

In 2017, Bible Society Australia celebrated its Bicentenary with a number of events and activities. This included a national celebration service on Sunday 5 March, held at the Hillsong Church main auditorium in Sydney and live streamed across the nation, and the launch of 'Our Mob, God's Story: Australian and Torres Strait Islanders Artists Share Their Faith', an art book that celebrates the impact of the Bible on Indigenous Australians. The book was awarded Christian Book of the Year, 2017.

The Bible Society Campaign, Keeping it Light, attracted controversy when it featured Liberal MPs Andrew Hastie and Tim Wilson appearing in a Bible Society video to debate same-sex marriage.

In July 2017, Bible Society Australia hosted 230 delegates from 90 Bible Societies for the annual United Bible Societies Roundtable Exchange conference.

After an unprecedented positive season of development, Greg Clarke resigned in June 2019. In the interim Melissa Lipsett became Acting CEO of the Bible Society.

In October 2019, Bible Society Chairperson Anne Robinson announced then current ordained Australian Christian Churches minister, Hillsong Church board member (resigned March 2021) and former Chief Marketing Officer Grant Thomson has become CEO. As well as her role at the Bible Society, Anne (through her own legal business) works closely with Hillsong's board in forming and developing a number of their governing processes.

Grant's leadership style in contrast to his predecessor is more reserved, less publicly engaged and more focused on forming strategic relationships such as with key political figures and Australian Pentecostal movement leaders.

Bible Society reported a net deficit of $1.4 million for the year ended 30 June 2023, and reported a net deficit of $7.3 million for the year ended 30 June 2024. The poor results in 2023-2024 were attributed to "difficulties with the new IT system installed in September 2023 for our retail operations (Koorong)", causing sales to fall by $4 million and incurring additional costs of $3.7 million related to the project.

Grant resigned from his role in December 2024. Simon Smart, Bible Society's Chief Media Officer, assumed the role of Acting CEO.

== Projects ==
=== Translation ===
Bible Society Australia supports the translation of the Bible into the world's languages, as well as typesetting and publication, including the production of audio versions of the Bible. This includes translations in the indigenous languages of Aboriginal and Torres Strait Islanders and a project to translate the Bible into Auslan (Australian sign language) for the more than 10,000 people who use that language. Overseas projects include Bible translations of the New Testament for ethnic minority groups in Vietnam, and in the Pacific Islands.

=== Engagement ===
Bible Society Australia is involved in a number of projects that foster greater engagement with the Christian Bible. For example, in September 2009, the Bible Society launched the largest promotional campaign ever undertaken by Christians in Australia, the Jesus—All About Life campaign, involving 1500 churches from 15 Christian denominations. In October 2012, the Bible Society's "25 words campaign" encouraged Australian Christians to commit to reading just one verse (or 25 words) from the Bible a day, for 31 days. The Bible Society also creates resources to help all ages engage with the Bible. The Wild Bible is a project that offers 34 free Bible animations for children.

=== Advocacy ===
In response to rising secularism in Australia the Bible Society engages with media outlets and the public to demonstrate the continuing relevance of the Bible in Australian society. In 2012 Bible Society Australia formed a partnership with Centre for Public Christianity, a not-for-profit media company that promotes the public understanding of the Christian faith. Since 2014 the Bible Society has run Masterclass youth events across Australia. CEO Greg Clarke's book, The Great Bible Swindle, was the 2015 winner of Australian Christian Book of the Year, arguing for the continued literary relevance of the Bible.

=== Publications ===
The Aussie Bible, first released in 2003, was a bestseller. In late 2016, Bible Society Australia bought Acorn Press and in July 2015, the organisation acquired leading Christian retailer Koorong. Roy Williams' book, 'In God They Trust', was launched in 2013 at NSW Parliament House by then NSW Liberal Treasurer Mike Baird and Labor Senator Ursula Stephens. The book examines the religious beliefs of Australia's Prime Ministers since Federation. In 2016, Bible Society Australia published, 'The Bible Down Under' by historian Meredith Lake.

=== Literacy ===
Bible Society Australia has supported literacy projects across the globe, from Africa (South Africa, South Sudan) to the Middle East, to South East Asia. Recent literacy projects in Egypt, Pakistan and South Africa aim to benefit lower socioeconomic groups, such as women and children.

=== Distribution ===
In 2016, Bible Society distributed 70,000 Scripture resources to Christian ministries, including free Bibles to mission groups, chaplains in hospital, prison and the defence force, as well as school Scripture teachers. Overseas, Bible Society Australia supported the distribution of Scriptures and Bible reading materials to children in war torn Syria, hospitalised children in Nicaragrua, and prisoners in South Africa.

=== Digital ===
In 2016, a new Eternity digital news service was designed and launched. Eternity is Australia's largest Christian newspaper and is named in honour of 'Mr Eternity', Arthur Stace. Eternity's founding editor, John Sandeman, departed in early 2022, and Eternity was closed on 30 April 2024.

In 2017, Bible Society Australia ran a campaign telling the story of Easter through a series of text messages. Given an uptake in the use of social media, particularly Bible apps, Bible Society Australia partnered with YouVersion to offer users a series of customised Bible reading plans, as part of its 200-year birthday celebrations.

=== Infrastructure ===
Bible Society Australia supports smaller Bible Societies across the world with infrastructure development such as training and the provision of resources. For example, Bible Society Australia supports the Arab Israeli Bible Society with ongoing funding of its projects.

=== Indigenous (Aboriginal and Torres Strait Islanders) ===
The Bible Society has long been engaged in Indigenous translation, and aims to maximise the ownership and contribution of Indigenous translators. Bibles are also produced in audio format. The organisation has always been the major publisher of Scriptures in Indigenous languages. Bible Society has published Scripture in almost all of these languages, ranging from portions and single Gospels through to full New Testament. The whole Bible has been published in Kriol. The Yumplatok New Testament was published by Bible Society Australia in 2014 after a translation process that took 27 years and Bible Society Australia is currently involved in The Pitjantjatjara Bible Translation Project.

In March, 2017 CEO Greg Clarke told the ABC there was a need to be honest about the mistakes of missionaries in the past who were involved in suppressing Indigenous languages and that Bible Society Australia is working to produce translations of the Bible in the very languages that were once suppressed.

== See also ==
- Bible society
