= Centre for Public Christianity =

Australian not-for-profit media company

The Centre for Public Christianity (CPX) is an Australian not-for-profit media company that supplies mainstream media and the general public with material about the relevance of Christianity in the 21st century. The centre has no denominational affiliation and seeks to represent historic Christianity as defined by the Nicene Creed.

== History ==
CPX was established in 2007. John Dickson and Greg J Clarke were its first directors, with Richard Grellman Chairman. Initial funding from Mission Australia helped get the venture started. After support from Hammond Care, CPX signed a memorandum of understanding with Bible Society Australia. Simon Smart has served as executive director since 2018.

== Activities ==
Writers from CPX have contributed articles to The Sydney Morning Herald, The Age, and the Australian Broadcasting Corporation (ABC).

CPX has an online resource library featuring interviews with writers, scholars and commentators. CPX releases a weekly 'Life & Faith' podcast.

CPX runs the annual Richard Johnson Lecture, a series that aims to "highlight Christianity’s relevance to society and positively contribute to public discourse on key aspects of civil life." 2018's speaker was Nick Spencer, Research Director of Theos, a think tank in London.

The centre has produced popular and academic works exploring the relevance of the Christian faith, including Public Christianity: Talking about faith in a post-Christian world, 10 Tips for Atheists and other conversations in faith and culture and The Wisdom of Islam and the Foolishness of Christianity. In 2013, Smart co-authored a book with Jane Caro, Antony Loewenstein and Rachel Woodlock called For God's Sake: An Atheist, a Jew, a Christian, and a Muslim debate religion.

In 2009 CPX released an historical documentary called The Life of Jesus that was shown nationally on the Seven Network.

In late 2015 CPX began work on a documentary: For the Love of God: How the Church is Better and Worse Than You Ever Imagined. The project considers the impact of Christianity on the world, both good and bad. It combines on-location filming with interviews with experts, including Marilynne Robinson, Rowan Williams, Alister McGrath and Miroslav Volf. The documentary was released in May 2018.
