= St Andrew's Anglican Church, Roseville =

St Andrew's Anglican Church
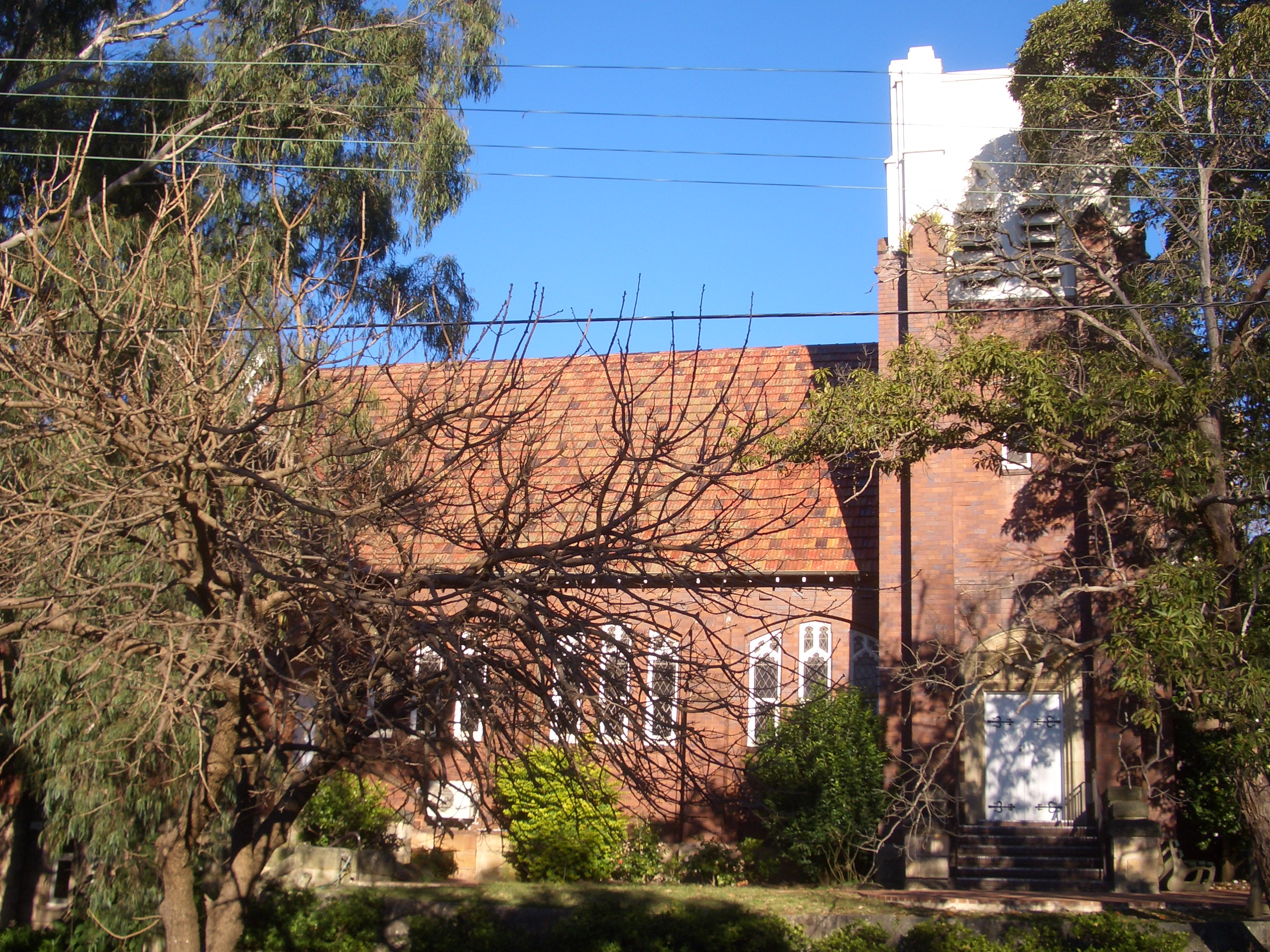
- St Andrew's Anglican Church
- 33°47′07″S 151°10′46″E
- Location: Corner Bancroft Avenue and Hill Street, Roseville, Sydney, New South Wales
- Country: Australia
- Denomination: Anglican
- Website: www.standrews.net.au

History
- Status: Church
- Founded: 2 April 1913 (first building); 27 April 1935 (second building)

Architecture
- Functional status: Active
- Architect: Clifford. H. Finch
- Architectural type: Church
- Construction cost: A£5,500

Specifications
- Materials: Red brick

Administration
- Province: New South Wales
- Diocese: Sydney
- Parish: St Andrew's, Roseville

St Andrew's Anglican Church, Roseville is an active Anglican church on the corner of Bancroft Avenue and Hill Street in Roseville, New South Wales, Australia. It is part of the Diocese of Sydney.

== History ==
The first church building was licensed for use on 2 April 1913. The foundation stone for the current building was laid by Archbishop Howard Mowll in 1935. The rector of the time was W. J. Roberts. The building was designed by C. H. Finch, and built by S. C. Molineaux, and seats approximately 350. The original cost of the building was approximately A£5,500.

The main level of the church consists of the nave, transepts, chancel, baptistry, organ chamber, porches, and a tower on the north west corner. The gradient of the land was utilised to allow for a lower level of vestries, offices, a kitchenette and bathroom. Originally one of these rooms was used as a kindergarten classroom. The walls are entirely of red brick, resting on a sandstone base. The windows are leaded.

== Gallery ==
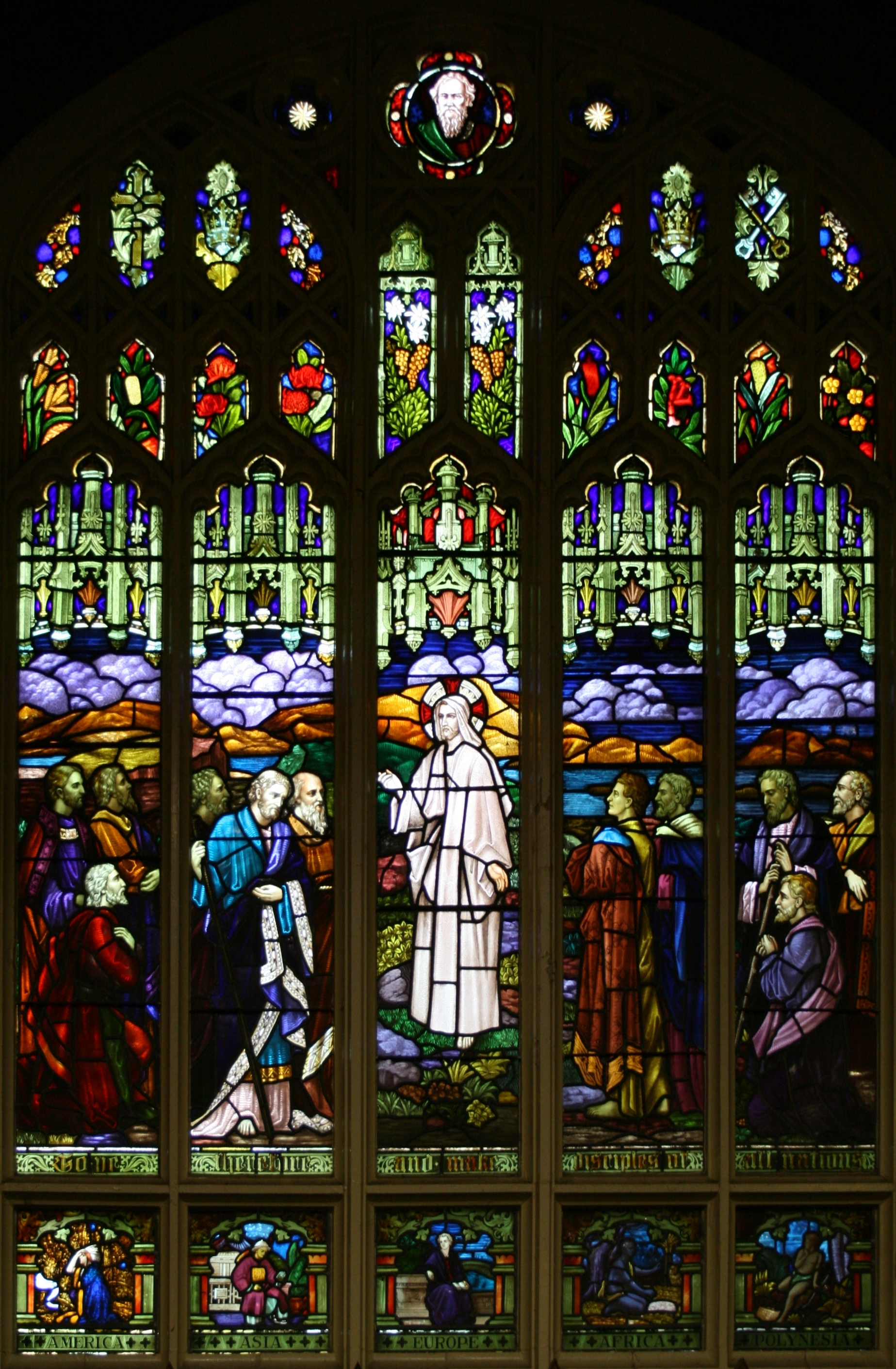
The main leadlight window.

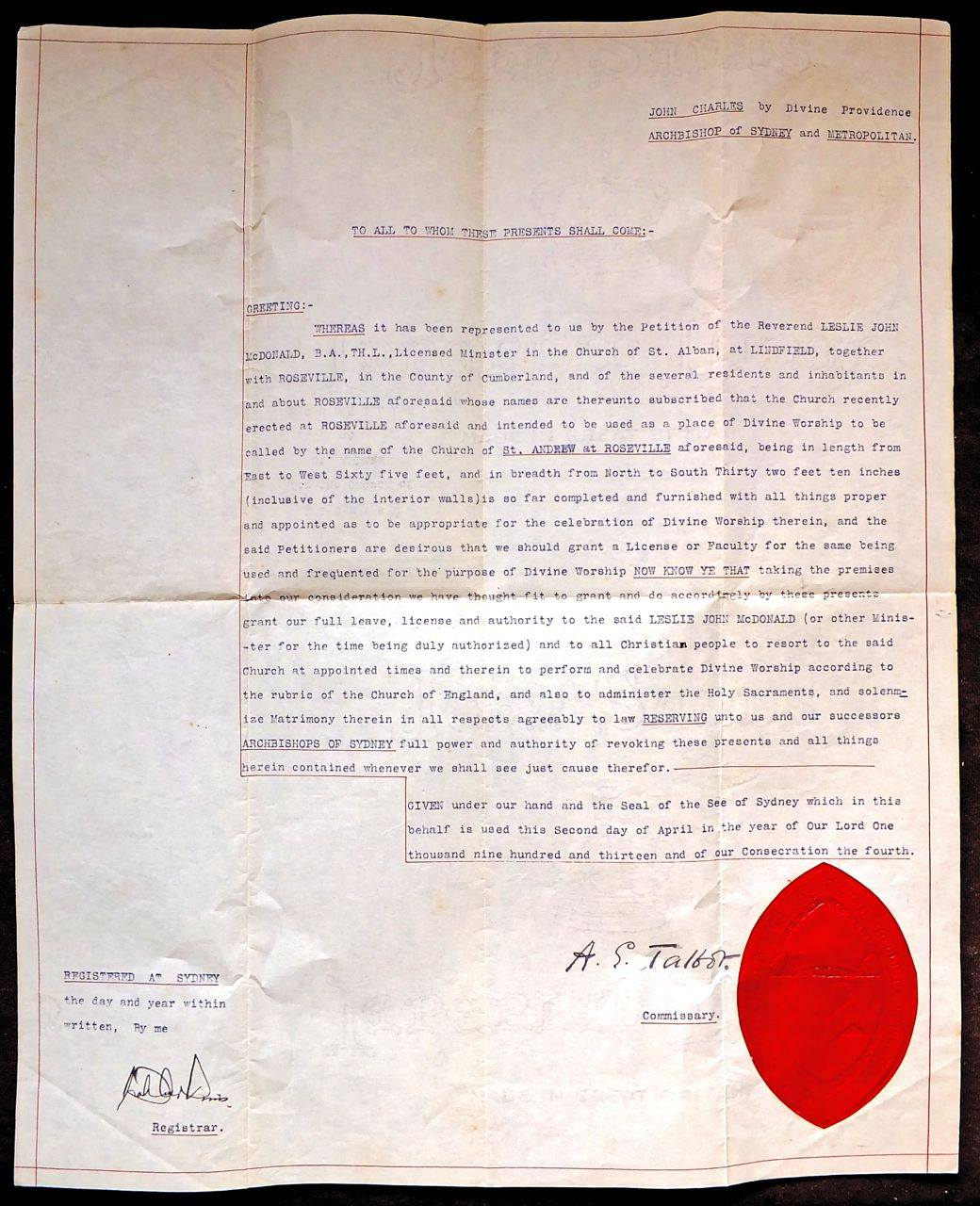
The 1913 licence from Archbishop John Wright to use the first church building as a place of worship.

== See also ==
- Australian non-residential architectural styles
- List of Anglican churches in the Diocese of Sydney
