= John Harris (biblical scholar) =

Australian linguist

John W. Harris
- Education: University of Queensland (PhD)
- Awards: Lambeth Degree
- Scientific career
- Fields: linguistics, Bible translation
- Institutions: Darwin Institute of Technology (now Charles Darwin University)
- Thesis: Language contact, Pidgins and the rise of Kriol in the Northern Territory: historical and theoretical perspectives (1986)
- Academic advisors: Bruce Rigsby, John Sandefur

John W. Harris is an Australian Bible translator and linguist known for his works on aboriginal Christianity and creoles. He is one of the first scholars who provided a detailed account of Australian creoles. In 1986, he was Senior Lecturer in Education at Darwin Institute of Technology. He received a Lambeth Degree from the Archbishop of Canterbury in 2010.

== Books ==
- 1986. Northern Territory pidgins and the origin of Kriol. Canberra: Pacific Linguistics
- 1994, One Blood: 200 Years Of Aboriginal Encounter With Christianity (revised edition), Albatross Books, Sydney.
- 1998, We wish we’d done more: ninety years of CMS and Aboriginal issues in north Australia, Openbook, Adelaide.
