= Daddy's DNA =

Promotional single by Brandon Lake

from the album King of Hearts
- Released: April 29, 2025
- Length: 4:30
- Label: Provident Label Group; Sony Music Entertainment
- Songwriters: Brandon Lake; Hank Bentley; Jacob Scooter
- Composers: Brandon Lake; Elizabeth Hashley; Hank Bentley; Jacob Scooter; Leon Gregory; Solo Ray; Zak Dillon
- Producers: Hank Bentley; Jacob Scooter

Brandon Lake singles chronology
"I Know a Name" (2025)	"Daddy's DNA" (2025)	"Sevens" (2025)

Music video
- "Daddy's DNA" on YouTube

"Daddy's DNA" is a song by American musician Brandon Lake. The song was released on April 29, 2025, as the second promotional single from Lake's fifth studio album, King of Hearts. The single includes the two previously released songs "Hard Fought Hallelujah" and "That's Who I Praise", both of which went on to top the Billboard Hot Christian Songs chart.

== Background ==
"Daddy's DNA" was released on April 29, 2025, as a promotional single. Upon release, it debuted at No. 1 on the iTunes store across all genres. Lyrically the song is based on the parable of the prodigal son. At American Idol Season 23, the song was performed by Lake and Breanna Nix as a non-competitive performance.

Lake shared the song was "maybe my favourite song I've ever written". The song was praised by Jelly Roll, who called it "song of the year". The song was written by Brandon Lake, Hank Bentley, and Jacob Scooter. Bentley and Scooter acted as producer. Lake, Bentley, Scooter, Elizabeth Hashley, Leon Gregory, Solo Ray, and Zak Dillon acted as composer.

== Commercial performance ==
"Daddy's DNA" peaked at No. 6 on the Billboard Hot Christian Songs chart and No. 34 on the Hot Rock & Alternative Songs chart. The song also charted at No. 4 on the Christian Digital Song Sales chart, No. 10 on the Christian Streaming Songs chart, and No. 4 on the Rock Digital Song Sales chart. On the Hot Rock Songs chart, the song hit No. 25.

== Track listing ==
No.	Title	Writer(s)	Producer(s)	Length
1.	"Daddy's DNA"	Brandon Lake; Hank Bentley; Jacob Scooter	Hank Bentley; Jacob Scooter	4:30
2.	"Hard Fought Hallelujah" (with Jelly Roll)	Brandon Lake; Steven Furtick; Benjamin William Hastings; Chris Brown; Jason Bradley DeFord; Rodrick Simmons	Micah Nichols	5:16
3.	"That's Who I Praise"	Lake; Steven Furtick; Benjamin William Hastings; Micah Nichols; Zac Lawson; Jake Lawson	Micah Nichols	3:48
Total length:				13:35

== Personnel ==
Adapted from Tidal.

- Brandon Lake – main artist, writer, composer
- Daniel Mackenzie – editor
- Elizabeth Hasley – composer
- Hank Bentley – producer, writer, composer, acoustic guitar, bass, recording engineer, resonator guitar
- Holly Zabka – executive producer
- Jacob Scooter – producer, writer, keyboards, recording engineer, steel guitar
- Leon Gregory – composer
- Matt Huber – mixing
- Pete Mol – background vocals, editor, keyboards, organ
- Sam Moses – masterer
- Solo Ray – composer
- Zak Dillon – composer

== Charts ==
=== Weekly ===
Weekly chart performance for "Daddy's DNA"
Chart (2025)	Peak position
US Hot Christian Songs (Billboard)	6
US Hot Rock & Alternative Songs (Billboard)	34

=== Year-end ===
Year-end chart performance for "Daddy's DNA"
Chart (2025)	Position
US Hot Christian Songs (Billboard)	37
