= Christian music industry =

Companies and individuals that create and sell Christian music

The Christian music industry is one aspect of the broader music industry, with a focus on Christian music and subgenres such as gospel music, southern gospel, contemporary Christian music, contemporary worship music, and even traditional church music. It is sometimes called the gospel music industry, a narrower term that does not encompass all the musical genres included here.

Like its broader category, the Christian music industry consists of individuals and organizations that earn money through writing songs, producing recorded music, presenting concerts, and performances on Christian radio. The Christian market also includes some unique aspects, such as hymnal production and church music licensed for congregational singing.

From its roots in the 1920s, the developing Christian music industry exhibited unique tensions between religious, musical, and commercial goals. While it was subject to the same economic and market forces as the entire music industry, the Christian subgenre was also subject to different aesthetic and social boundaries. This was often expressed as a tension between “secular” and “sacred” ideals. Recent scholarship explores why Christian music remained marginal to the general market, was largely critiqued by mainstream media, and was often criticized for being derivative.

== History ==
The contemporary Christian music industry has roots in the late 1960s and early 1970s Jesus movement and its Jesus music artists. The Encyclopedia of Contemporary Christian Music points out three reasons that the Christian music industry developed as a parallel structure to the general music industry. First, the Jesus movement produced a large number of bands in a very short period, which the general market was unable and/or unwilling to absorb. This was in part due to a lack of appreciation for the ideology expressed by such artists. Finally, Jesus music artists tended toward mistrust of secular corporations. According to another critic, the industry in this period was defined by four characteristics: lack of audience acceptance for styles, inferior production, inefficient distribution, and lack of wide radio exposure. Petra, for instance, struggled to find an audience for their hard rock sound, partially due to limited distribution to Christian bookstores.

Even so, the 1970s saw established corporations become involved in the Christian music market. Word Records, founded in 1951, was bought in 1976 by ABC. Other music industry giants also got involved, CBS started a short-lived Christian label, Priority Records, and MCA also fielded a label, Songbird Records, for a time.

While the Jesus movement had ended by the 1980s, the Christian music industry was maturing and transforming into a multimillion-dollar enterprise. The early 1980s saw an increase Christian booksellers taking product, and an increase in sales followed, despite the recession. As a percentage of gross sales, Christian music rose from 9% in 1976 to 23% in 1985. By her 1982 release Amy Grant had saturated the Christian marketplace and made significant inroads into the general market. Sandi Patti and Michael W. Smith also gained influence within Christian music, each playing significant roles in the development of the industry.

Harder forms of Christian music, such as heavy metal, also began to gain acceptance. This is largely credited to Stryper, who had begun making inroads into the general market by 1985. Still, rock and alternative acts faced a longer battle for acceptance than contemporary acts, as the form was opposed by prominent religious leaders such as Jimmy Swaggart and others on the Christian right. While in 1981 total gospel music industry revenues were approximately $180 million, only ten years later they would total $680 million, according to CCM Magazine.

RIAA sales, 1995–2000
| Year | % | $ | Source |
|---|---|---|---|
| 1995 | 3.1 | 381 | |
| 1996 | 4.3 | 538 | |
| 1997 | 4.5 | 549 | |
| 1998 | 6.3 | 836 | |
| 1999 | 5.1 | 744 | |
| 2000 | 4.8 | 688 | |
Notes: Percentage figures out of total music market.; Dollar figures in millions.; RIAA figures often differ from those reported by Nielsen SoundScan.; These figures represent only revenue from album sales, and exclude other sources.

According to RIAA data, market share for sales of Christian music albums more than doubled between 1993 and 1997. In the 1990s the Christian music industry became the fastest growing segment of the music industry. This was due to several factors, including consolidation of record labels, and independent Christian bookstores into chains.

The Christian music industry began adopting SoundScan in 1995, although implementation was spotty even into the millennium. Even so, the adoption caused the visibility of Christian artists to increase significantly, and brought credibility to the industry as Christian albums became integrated into all Billboard charts.

In 1985, 90% of Christian music sales originated at Christian bookstores. By 1995, that number had dropped to 64%, with general retailers taking 21%, and the remainder accountable through other methods, such as direct mail. At that same time, the industry was estimated to gross $750 million, with $381 million in album sales. In the late 1990s, general market retailers, especially big box stores such as Best Buy, Walmart, Target, and Blockbuster began carrying a wider selection of Christian music products. By 2000 those stores had surpassed Christian retail in terms of the number of Christian albums sold, according to Soundscan numbers. This phenomenon was partially responsible for crossover successes. P.O.D., for example, sold 1.4 million albums in 2001, although sales at Christian retail outlets accounted for only 10%.

The new millennium has brought challenges for the record industry as a whole, and these have affected the Christian music industry as well. Contemporary worship music, a long time staple of the industry, began to gain significant market share in about the year 2000. By focusing on marketing worship music to youth culture, this genre became a growth driver despite the downturn in the general music industry.

"The money is just drying up.
And it's not being replaced."

— John W. Styll, president, Gospel Music Association and longtime CCM publisher

Growth continued until about 2003, but has generally followed the trends of the larger music industry since that point. In 2009 a New York Times op-ed placed the entire music industry on a "deathwatch," pointing out that new forms of media, piracy, and new pricing options are driving gross sales down. In another example of parallelism, the Christian music industry has experienced largely the same phenomenon. In the Christian marketplace, music consumption has risen by as much as 30% since 2005, but overall album sales have dropped to about half of their 1999 levels. However, some critics point out that the current downturn may have long term positive effects for the industry. John J. Thompson told Christianity Today that "The lack of monetary benefit has filtered out some of the people who should not have been doing this in the first place. If the people who are in it for the money are gone, it leaves more turf for those who had something a little bit loftier in mind."

In 2025, Billboard noticed a significant increase in the success of Christian music, as two Christian songs, Brandon Lake and Jelly Roll's "Hard Fought Hallelujah" and Forrest Frank's "Your Way's Better" appeared on the Billboard Hot 100 chart at the same time, the first time an such an occurrence has happened since 2013, and only the second time overall. Later that year, several more Christian songs appeared on the chart, including Frank and The Figs' "Lemonade", Phil Wickham's "What an Awesome God", and Josiah Queen's "Dusty Bibles". That same year, a rise in Christian-based themes in mainstream rap and hip-hop music. Luminate reported the genre increasing by 18.5% on-demand streams in comparison with 2024.

== Criticisms ==
=== "Ghetto" assertion ===
Christian music is sometimes cited as a "ghetto," meaning that the majority of artists in the industry are pigeonholed to operate solely in it. These artists are isolated from the mainstream public, to Christian media, including radio, magazines, and book stores. For many this is a conscious choice, however others, not content to stay in an isolated industry segment, attempt to "cross over" and gain acceptance in the general market. For many artists, being called Christian becomes a stigma.

Name recognition in Christian music
| Artist | Familiarity |
| Amy Grant | 70% |
| Amy Grant | 67% |
| BeBe and CeCe Winans | 43% |
| BeBe and CeCe Winans | 13% |
| Sandi Patty | 42% |
| Sandi Patty | 13% |
| Carman | 33% |
| Carman | 9% |
| Michael W. Smith | 30% |
| Michael W. Smith | 10% |
| dc Talk | 26% |
| dc Talk | 11% |
| Steven Curtis Chapman | 26% |
| Steven Curtis Chapman | 6% |
A 1997 survey looked at familiarity with "well-known" Christian artists. Self-identified Christian music listeners in are shown in green, and the general public in red.

A 1997 study revealed that a self-identified audience of "Christian music listeners" had what was considered a lacking recognition of Christian artists. The survey was commissioned by the Christian Music Trade Association and Z Music Television. The study looked at several artists including Amy Grant, BeBe and CeCe Winans, Carman, Steven Curtis Chapman, dc Talk, Sandi Patty, and Michael W. Smith. At the time of the survey, each of these artists was active in Christian music and had been so for at least nine years, was a multiple Dove Award and/or Grammy Award winner, and had albums certified Gold or higher.

Even so, the survey found that the Christian music audience was no more familiar with artists in the field than they were with Hootie & The Blowfish, a popular act at that time. The study concluded that the word "Christian" was the problem, causing a stigma. "It's the label, not the music, that dissuades," one Christian music executive was quoted as saying, agreeing with the survey.

Another aspect of the "ghetto" is that some artists have trouble gaining audience with Christians due to their non-conservative image. Stryper is a well-known example. Stryper received large amounts of criticism from groups on the Christian right, who argue (among other things) that their image as rock stars contradict their espoused faith. One critic wrote that the marriage of secular and religious elements in "Christian music" "violates all that God has commanded in the Bible about separation."

The "ghetto" has several effects, critics point out that the audience of such artists are often already Christians, thus limiting the impact of any supposed "evangelism." Another is that artists sometimes have trouble appealing to and maintaining both secular and religious audiences. For example:

- One Jesus music artist, Randy Matthews, ran into trouble at an early Christian music festival after announcing an upcoming tour with Lynyrd Skynyrd and ZZ Top. The crowd, also reacting to his electric musical style, chased him off the stage, pronouncing him to be demon or drug possessed. Matthews was later dropped from the tour.
- After Bob Dylan announced his conversion to Christianity in 1979, he released three albums widely cited as being based on his newfound faith. Dylan spent several years touring and preaching from stage, though he never became a part of the "Christian music subculture." The result, as one critic bluntly puts it, was that "It didn't work. Christian music fans were characteristically suspicious of Dylan's failure to leave the world behind and become a part of their little ghetto, and the world at large tired quickly of paying money to hear him sing about religion." By 1981, Dylan had dropped the explicit religious references; both critics and audiences returned his music to acclaim.
- While commonly cited as the father of Christian rock, Larry Norman struggled to gain acceptance from the Christian music industry, and was largely estranged from it for his career. His 1969 solo album, Upon This Rock, has been described by secular observers as "perhaps the first truly accomplished and relevant Christian rock testimony ever recorded," and 1972's Only Visiting This Planet became one of the most revered albums of all time in Christian music. Even so, Norman became, according to CCM "so far outside the mainstream that most of today's Christian music fans have no idea who Larry Norman is."

The problem, as summed by one critic, was that the music was too religious for secular audience, while simultaneously too aggressive for religious audiences. One critic describes the situation, stating that for a band "to be taken seriously outside the Christian scene, a band must stay far, far away from that scene."

Mutemath, for instance sued their record label with the goal of removing their product from the Christian market. Their first release sold almost 30,000 copies, with "bulk of sales coming from the Christian market," according to Billboard. The band had been placed in the Christian market by their record label largely because their lead singer, Paul Meany, was previously with the band Earthsuit, whose only major label release was released on a Christian label.

This caused the band to not get taken seriously by music critics, and by the release of their full-length album the band began expressing discontent with their situation. Meany told Tucson Weekly "...we began to see ourselves getting pigeonholed into this particular world that we weren't necessarily proud to be associated with... We're not trying to preach through our music; we don't have some kind of evangelistic agenda with what we're doing... You know, you don't want to be ashamed of your faith and your beliefs, but you don't want to be marketed by that, either."

On the other hand, some artists operate solely within the "ghetto" of Christian music, and find great success in doing so.

=== Downplayed religious content ===
An early Christian record label, Lamb & Lion Records (founded by Pat Boone) reported in 1978 that it was their goal to produce crossover artists, but they were limited by lack of distribution to the secular marketplace. Both problems affected Christian labels into the 1990s. "Since people don't understand [the term] 'the Blood of Jesus, '" stated a manager for Lamb & Lion, "...music that communicates must approach it another way. We've got to present a subtle but sensitive Christian message." Lyrics with subdued religious content have become commonplace in the industry; One critic points out that the secular hit "Spirit in the Sky" "has more explicit religious references than do many recent Christian radio hits."

Some critics have alleged that CCM often uses "minimal direct theology," and promotes a "Jesus is my boyfriend" image of God. Using downplayed religious content in lyrics has allowed some artists to "cross over" and make significant impact into the general market. Some Christian bands are able to do this while maintaining their identity in the Christian market. For example, MercyMe, whose double platinum album Almost There produced the Christian and secular chart hit "I Can Only Imagine." However, the lyrics of the single, while Christian in nature, contain what one critic calls "rather vacuous theology."

Sometimes "crossing over" creates ambiguity over whether an artist is Christian (a "Christian band"), or the artist is composed of Christians and produces music that appeals to Christian music fans but does not cater to the Christian market ("Christians in a band"). Such artists are:

- Chevelle, whose debut album was released to Christian music markets, received three Dove Awards. However, the band is not generally considered to be a "Christian band" today. On that topic the band states "We originally signed with a record company that was backed by Word (a Christian label housing John Tesh and Amy Grant), so the record was in Christian bookstores. It was really an accidental thing."
- Project 86 has sometimes been labeled a "Christian band", although the band itself eschewed the label. The band considers its art to be the best conveyance of their message. Frontman Andrew Schwab has offered several statements on the topic. "We're not going to go in there and say 'Hey we're the Christian band. We're going to carry ourselves like a normal band. Hopefully people will like our music and investigate into the band [...] and they will learn our beliefs." "If we're playing at Ozzfest or on Family Values...," the band told 7ball after the release of their second album, "there is a greater level of tact necessary in order to reach that sort of audience." In a 2007 interview, Schwab further opined "We always tell people that the goal has been to just write music that we love, and write music hopefully that is challenging and inspiring to people and doesn't sound like everything else out there."
- Switchfoot is often referred to as a "Christian band", mostly due to their involvement with the Christian rock scene in their early days. But the band has always shunned this label: "For us, it's a faith, not a genre,..." says Jon Foreman. "...these songs are for everyone. Calling us 'Christian rock' tends to be a box that closes some people out and excludes them. And that's not what we're trying to do. Music has always opened my mind—and that's what we want". Duly, Foreman's lyrics steer clear of preachiness, exclusive declarations of faith, or even any mention of Jesus Christ, instead questioning the status quo, probing existential issues through "Socratic dialogue" in which he answers questions with more questions, exploring frustrations, or simply being inspirational. Even so, this position has not alienated their Christian fans. As in their indie days, they are still distributed to Christian retail outlets through Sparrow Records, featured on Christian radio and charts, and presented Dove Awards, even after having been signed to the mainstream Columbia Records. Spin writer Andrew Beaujon takes the view that "their lyrics often have two different meanings, one meaning for a Christian audience and one meaning for the rest of us. They try to relate to two different groups of people at once".

==== In video ====
The trend continues when examining religious videos. Many Christian bands produce videos with rotation on MTV in mind, however, the images can lead to an ambiguous impression of the portrayal.

In 1982 MTV featured two videos, "Constantly Changing" and "It's Mad" (which was the first one to be featured), made by the Swedish Christian rock band Jerusalem to promote their 1981 release Warrior. DeGarmo and Key was the first Christian band in the US whose video appeared on MTV, made a video for their single "Six, Six, Six" off their 1984 release Communication. While the video was shown on MTV for a short time, it was subsequently pulled for a scene which depicted the Antichrist engulfed in flames, which MTV described as "senseless violence." Eventually the video was re-edited for MTV—however, the unedited version continued to play in Christian bookstores and on Christian television networks, like Trinity Broadcasting. The video received a Dove Award in a category created especially for it, "Gospel Music Visual Song" in 1985.

Another artist, Brian Welch, whose solo debut was released to Christian markets, found their album pulled from some Christian bookstores after the music video for "Flush" was released. The video is an interpretation of the authors personal experience with methamphetamine, before his religious conversion. At the time the album was pulled, Brian Welsh released a statement about the visual content of the video, relating its symbolism to his personal experiences of addiction and redemption. He also issued the following statement: "The video for 'Flush' is about crystal meth addiction and the crazy things anyone addicted to meth will do while they're high or to get their fix. Everything the models were doing in the video is what I was wrapped up in while I was addicted to meth... I believe I would be dead right now if I continued using meth, but instead, I chose to surrender my life to Christ and die to myself so He could share His resurrection with me... There is a huge message of hope on my CD and I believe those retailers that are pulling the CD from their shelves are robbing someone spiritually by taking it off of the shelves."

Classification of videos on Z Music by content
1. Ambiguously Religious (31.0%)
2. Moderately Religious (52.0%)
3. Unequivocally Religious (17.0%)

A study of visual elements of Christian music videos on Z Music Television, a now defunct MTV-like channel for Christian music, found that almost one third of the channel's videos could be described as "Ambiguously Religious" at best (red area, right). The conclusion was that the channel's programming was designed to make its Christian nature "apparent only to those willing to listen for it."

=== Other arguments ===
Some critics describe the Christian music industry as being committed "to the goals and strategies of the commercial marketplace – industrial growth, increased market share, and greater profits." This became more apparent in the 1980s and 1990s as the largest Christian record labels became subsidiaries of the "mainstream" labels (who are themselves owned by huge media conglomerates like Viacom and Time Warner). Others see the industry as taking on the roles traditionally reserved for the church. Concerts are the equivalent of religious services, and commodities symbols of faith. Under these conditions "evangelism becomes rhetoric—justifying the propaganda value of the industry's work – not spiritual reality." One critic comments that "perhaps the 'ghettoization' and parallel institutionalism of CCM manifests itself nowhere more apparently than at numerous Christian rock festivals."

== See also ==
- List of Christian media organizations
- Christian Copyright Licensing International
- Gospel Music Association
