= Invisible (Leeland album) =

Studio album by Leeland
- Released: July 22, 2016
- Genre: Worship, Christian pop, Christian rock
- Length: 61:37
- Label: Bethel
- Producer: Kyle Lee

Leeland chronology
The Great Awakening (2011)	Invisible (2016)

Singles from Invisible
- 1. "Invisible" Released: September 26, 2016

Invisible is the fifth studio album by Leeland, released on July 22, 2016 through Bethel Music.

== Critical reception ==
Professional ratings
Review scores
Source	Rating
CCM Magazine	5/5 stars
The Christian Beat	4.5/5 stars
New Release Today	4/5 stars

CCM Magazine's Matt Conner describes, "Leeland’s latest proves itself well worth the wait." Jonathan J. Francesco, in a NewReleaseToday review, states, "Leeland has crafted a worship album that should remind artists and listeners alike of what worship music can and should be." Chris Major of The Christian Beat writes, "For listeners wanting a flowing and moving collection of powerful, truth-filled worship music, Leeland's Invisible surpasses expectations."

== Accolades ==
The song, "Lion and the Lamb", was No. 8 on the Worship Leader's Top 20 Songs of 2016 list.

On August 9, 2017, the Gospel Music Association was announced that the song "Lion and the Lamb" would be nominated for a GMA Dove Award in the Song of the Year and Worship Song of the Year categories at the 48th Annual GMA Dove Awards.

== Track listing ==
No.	Title	Writer(s)	Length
1.	"Bells of Notre Dame"	Leeland Mooring, Casey Moore	3:06
2.	"Invisible"	L. Mooring, Moore, Kyle Lee	4:39
3.	"King of My Heart"	L. Mooring, Moore	5:00
4.	"Perfect Love"	L. Mooring, Moore, Steffany Gretzinger	5:24
5.	"Lion and the Lamb"	L. Mooring, Brenton Brown, Brian Johnson	4:31
6.	"139 / Dead of Night"	L. Mooring, Lee, Moore, David O. Ramirez	5:57
7.	"Ever Love You"	L. Mooring, Moore	5:16
8.	"The War"	L. Mooring, Jack Mooring, Seth Mosley, Moore	4:10
9.	"Son Was Lifted Up" (featuring Brian Johnson)	Mooring, Lee, Moore, Johnson	5:58
10.	"Carry It All Away"	L. Mooring, Lee, Moore	3:56
11.	"Beloved"	Darlene Zschech, L. Mooring, Moore	5:40
12.	"For Your Glory"	L. Mooring	5:14
13.	"Bells of Notre Dame II"	L. Mooring, Moore	2:46
Total length:			61:37

== Charts ==
Chart (2016)	Peak position
New Zealand Heatseekers Albums (RMNZ)	4
UK Christian & Gospel Albums (OCC)	2
US Billboard 200	200
US Christian Albums (Billboard)	5
US Top Alternative Albums (Billboard)	15
US Top Rock Albums (Billboard)	19
