= Love Is on the Move =

Love is on the Move

Studio album by Leeland
- Released: August 25, 2009
- Studio: Dark Horse Recording (Franklin, Tennessee): Legion of Boom Studio (Nashville, Tennessee)
- Genre: Christian rock
- Length: 49:57
- Label: Reunion, Essential
- Producer: Ed Cash: Steve Wilson

Leeland chronology
Opposite Way (2008)	Love is on the Move (2009)	The Great Awakening (2011)

Singles from Love is on the Move
- 1. "Follow You" Released: August 4, 2009

Professional ratings
Review scores
Source	Rating
Jesus Freak Hideout	3/5 stars
AllMusic	4.5/5 stars

Love Is on the Move is the third studio album by Christian band Leeland. It was released on August 25, 2009, and debuted at number 5 on the Billboard Christian Albums chart.

The single "New Creation" is inspired by the verse in 2 Corinthians 5 v 17, which says "Therefore, if anyone is in Christ, he is a new creation."

== Track listing ==
Album release
No.	Title	Writer(s)	Length
1.	"The Door"	Leeland Dayton Mooring, Jack Anthony Mooring, Steve Wilson, William Jacob Holtz	3:52
2.	"Follow You" (featuring Brandon Heath)	L. Mooring, J. Mooring, Ed Cash	4:22
3.	"Via Dolorosa"	L. Mooring, J. Mooring, Cash	4:07
4.	"Pure Bride"	L. Mooring	4:24
5.	"Carry Me on Your Back"	L. Mooring, J. Mooring, Cash	3:53
6.	"New Creation"	L. Mooring, J. Mooring, Cash	3:43
7.	"Lift Your Eyes Up"	L. Mooring	3:58
8.	"Weak Man"	L. Mooring, J. Mooring, Cash	3:58
9.	"Love Is on the Move"	L. Mooring, J. Mooring, Wilson, Holtz	4:24
10.	"Learn to Love"	L. Mooring, J. Mooring, Wilson, Holtz	3:27
11.	"Holy Spirit Have Your Way"	L. Mooring, J. Mooring, Cash	3:56
12.	"My Jesus"	L. Mooring, J. Mooring, Cash	5:53
Total length:			49:57

== Personnel ==
Leeland

- Leeland Mooring – lead vocals, acoustic piano, electric guitars
- Jack Mooring – keyboards, harmony vocals
- Jake Holtz – bass
- Mike Smith – drums

Additional musicians

- Jason Webb – keyboards
- Ed Cash – keyboards, programming, acoustic guitars, harmonica, backing vocals
- Mike Payne – electric guitars
- Steve Wilson – mandolin, bass, percussion, arrangements
- John Catchings – cello
- Justin Sanders – cello
- Brent Milligan – double bass
- Kristin Wilkinson – viola
- David Davidson – violin, strings
- Martin Cash – backing vocals
- Jason McArthur – backing vocals
- Brandon Heath – vocals (2)

Choir

- Leanne Palmore, Nirva Ready, Christi Richardson, Jerard Woods and Jovaun Woods

=== Production ===
- Jason McArthur – executive producer
- Steve Wilson – producer (1, 9, 10), engineer (1, 9, 10), mixing (1, 9, 10)
- Ed Cash – producer (2–8, 11, 12), engineer (2–8, 11, 12), co-mixing (2–6, 8, 11, 12)
- Rob Burrell – mixing (1, 7, 9, 10)
- Tony Palacios – co-mixing (2–6, 8, 11, 12)
- Matt Armstrong – assistant engineer (2–8, 11, 12)
- Ted Jensen – mastering at Sterling Sound (New York, NY)
- Heather Hetzler – A&R production
- Tim Parker – art direction, design
- Jeremy Cowart – photography
- Samantha Roe – wardrobe
- Heather Cummings – hair, make-up
- Proper Management – management
