= Opposite Way =

Studio album by Leeland
- Released: February 26, 2008
- Recorded: April 2007
- Studio: Pentavarit, The Smoakstack and TrueTone Studio (Nashville, Tennessee)
- Genre: Christian rock
- Length: 40:30
- Label: Essential
- Producer: Matt Bronleewe; Jason McArthur (executive)

Leeland chronology
| Sound of Melodies (2006) | Opposite Way (2008) | Love is on the Move (2009) |

Professional ratings
Review scores
| Source | Rating |
|---|---|
| Christian Music Today | 4/5 stars |
| Evade the Noise | 4/5 stars |
| Jesus Freak Hideout | 4/5 stars |
| AllMusic | 4.5/5 stars |

Opposite Way is the second studio album from the Christian band Leeland, released on February 26, 2008. The album reached #1 on the iTunes Store Christian Albums chart in its debut week. "Count Me In" and the title track "Opposite Way" have been released as radio singles.

== Track listing ==
Album release
| No. | Title | Writer(s) | Length |
|---|---|---|---|
| 1. | "Count Me In" | Leeland Mooring, Jack Mooring, Jake Holtz, Mike Smith | 4:06 |
| 2. | "Let It Out Now" | L. Mooring | 3:34 |
| 3. | "Enter This Temple" | L. Mooring, J. Mooring | 3:21 |
| 4. | "Opposite Way" | L. Mooring, J. Mooring, Holtz, Smith | 3:40 |
| 5. | "Wake Up" | L. Mooring, J. Mooring | 3:07 |
| 6. | "Beginning and the End" | L. Mooring, J. Mooring, Holtz | 3:09 |
| 7. | "Brighter Days" | L. Mooring | 3:42 |
| 8. | "Falling for You" | L. Mooring, J. Mooring, Steve Wilson | 3:41 |
| 9. | "Don't Go Away" | L. Mooring, J. Mooring, Holtz, Smith | 3:35 |
| 10. | "Thief in the Night" | L. Mooring | 4:22 |
| 11. | "May Our Praise" | L. Mooring, J. Mooring | 4:21 |
| Total length: | | | 40:38 |

== Personnel ==
Leeland

- Leeland Mooring – vocals, guitars
- Jack Mooring – pianos, vocals
- Matt Campbell – guitars
- Jake Holtz – bass
- Mike Smith – drums

Additional musicians

- Paul Moak – additional instruments
- David Henry – strings

=== Production ===
- Jason McArthur – executive producer
- Matt Bronleewe – producer
- Rusty Varenkamp – engineer, editing
- Paul Moak – additional engineer
- Aaron Swihart – additional engineer
- David Henry – string recording
- Ben Grosse – mixing at The Mix Room (Burbank, California)
- Lee Bridges – editing
- Ben Phillips – editing
- Ted Jensen – mastering at Sterling Sound (New York, NY)
- Heather Hetzler – A&R
- Lani Crump – production coordinator
- Dave Steunebrink – production coordinator
- Becka Blackburn – art direction
- Tim Parker – art direction, graphic design
- Tec Petaja – photography
- Robin Geary – hair, make-up
- Samantha Roe – stylist
- Left of Center Management – management

== Singles ==
- "Count Me In" (Peaked at #25 on Billboard's Hot Christian Songs chart).
- "Opposite Way"

== Music videos ==
- "Count Me In" (January 4, 2008)

== Awards ==
The album was nominated for a Dove Award for Praise & Worship Album of the Year at the 40th GMA Dove Awards.
