= 57th GMA Dove Awards =

2026 award ceremony for music

57th Annual Dove Awards
- Awarded for: Excellence in the Christian music industry
- Date: October 7, 2026
- Location: Bridgestone Arena (Nashville, Tennessee)
- Hosted by: Tauren Wells
- Most wins: Phil Wickham, Brandon Lake, Josiah Queen (3)
- Most nominations: Jonathan Smith (14)
- Website: doveawards.com

Television/radio coverage
- Network: TBN

The 57th Annual Dove Awards honored the best recordings, compositions, and musicians within the Christian music industry for the eligibility period of May 1, 2025 to April 30, 2026, as chosen by the Gospel Music Association. The presentation ceremony was held on October 7, 2026, at the Bridgestone Arena in Nashville, Tennessee, and was broadcast exclusively on TBN. It was hosted by eight-time winner Tauren Wells, marking Wells' fourth consecutive year as host.

The nominees for the ceremony were announced on July 29, 2026. Jonathan Smith held the most nominations, with fourteen, while Phil Wickham held the most nominations for an artist, with nine, and CeCe Winans held the most nominations for a female artist, with seven. Wickham, Brandon Lake, and Josiah Queen tied for the most wins, each with three, and Tasha Cobbs Leonard received the most for a female artist, with two. Wickham was awarded with Artist of the Year, Queen's "Dusty Bibles" received Song of the Year, and Jamie MacDonald was named New Artist of the Year. Winans' acception of Gospel Worship Recorded Song of the Year for "More than This" caused her to become the most awarded female gospel artist of all time.

== Promotion ==
The date for the ceremony was announced in late 2025 subsequent to the conclusion to the prior award show; it was initially announced for October 6, 2026, but was later rescheduled to the following day. Tickets were made available for purchase beginning on December 15, 2025, and an exclusive presale became available on December 11. The date of the nominee announcement was publicly released on July 24, 2026, and the nominees themselves were announced on July 29.

On September 9, 2026, the first round of presenters and performers was announced, and the second was announced on September 16, 2026. The ceremony will be promoted with a headlining performance from Elevation Worship at the Ryman Auditorium on October 5.

== Presenters and performers ==
=== First round ===
The first round of presenters and performers was announced on September 9, 2026.

==== Presenters ====
- For King & Country
- CeCe Winans
- Anthony Brown
- Julie Chen Moonves
- Karen Peck
- Lisa Knowles-Smith
- Sarai Rivera

==== Performers ====
- TobyMac
- Anne Wilson
- Chosen Road
- Tasha Cobbs Leonard
- Tauren Wells

=== Second round ===
The second round of presenters and performers was announced on September 16, 2026.

==== Presenters ====
- Bart Millard of MercyMe
- Terrian
- Cain
- Moriah
- Jen Lilley
- Kelontae Gavin
- CalledOut Music

==== Performers ====
- Jamie MacDonald
- Naomi Raine
- Hulvey

=== Third round ===
The third round of presenters and performers was announced on September 29, 2026. The third round also contains two additional performers as a tribute to American singer-songwriter Dolly Parton, who died earlier that year.

==== Presenters ====
- Christine D'Clario
- Chris Tomlin
- Cory Asbury
- Hezekiah Walker
- Jenn Johnson
- Marvin Sapp
- Shawn Johnson East from The Chosen
- George H. Xanthis
- Paras Patel

==== Performers ====
- Brandon Lake
- Lainey Wilson
- Tye Tribbett
- Hope Darst
- Elevation Worship

==== Dolly Parton tribute ====
- Natalie Grant
- Amy Grant

== Nominees and winners ==
The nominees were announced on July 29, 2026. Winners are highlighted in bold.

=== General ===
Artist of the Year	Song of the Year
Brandon Lake; CeCe Winans; Josiah Queen; Lauren Daigle; **Phil Wickham**	"Can't Steal My Joy" – Josiah Queen and Brandon Lake; "Come Jesus Come" – CeCe Winans; "**Dusty Bibles**" – Josiah Queen; "God I'm Just Grateful" – Elevation Worship and Chandler Moore; "Homesick for Heaven" – Phil Wickham; "I Know a Name" – Elevation Worship and Brandon Lake; "Left It in the River" – Jamie MacDonald; "Mighty Name of Jesus" – Hope Darst; "No Fear" – Jon Reddick; "What an Awesome God" – Phil Wickham
New Artist of the Year	Producer of the Year
Bodie; Emerson Day; **Jamie MacDonald**; Megan Woods; SEU Worship	Austin Davis; Jacob Sooter; Jeff Pardo; **Jonathan Smith**; Kyle Lee
Songwriter of the Year (Artist)	Songwriter of the Year (Non-Artist)
**Brandon Lake**; Chandler Moore; Chris Brown; Josiah Queen; Phil Wickham	Hank Bentley; **Jacob Sooter**; Jonathan Smith; Steven Furtick; Zac Lawson
Recorded Music Packaging of the Year	Long Form Music Video of the Year
Blameless – Jackie Hill Perry; Honest Conversations – Katy Nichole; **Mt. Zion** – Josiah Queen; Real – Blessing Offor; Reconstruction – Lecrae	Eterno Dios – Gateway Worship Español; Just That Good – Passion; Memorandum – Kristene DiMarco; Sons of Sunday – Sons of Sunday; **The Resurrection of a King** – Tommee Profitt
Short Form Music Video of the Year (Concept)	Short Form Music Video of the Year (Performance)
"Heaven on My Mind" – TobyMac; "I've Got a Fire" – Pat Barrett; "Raised By Wolves" – Franni Cash; "Sevens" – Brandon Lake; "**World on Fire**" – For King and Country and Taylor Hill	"Campaign" – KB; "Far Country" – Ellie Holcomb; "**Have Your Way**" – Katy Nichole; "I Ain't Worried" – Jackie Hill Perry; "Worthy of It All (Worthy)" – CeCe Winans

=== Rap/Hip Hop ===
Rap/Hip Hop Recorded Song of the Year	Rap/Hip Hop Album of the Year
"Bless You" – Lecrae and Torey D'Shaun; "Dave" – Hulvey; "God Did II" – Rua Young and KB; "**Rob Hell**" – Indie Tribe, Nobigdyl, and Torey D'Shaun featuring Jon Keith; "Yes" – Steven Malcolm, For King & Country, and KB	Blameless – Jackie Hill Perry; **Could Be Tonight** – Hulvey; Fine by Me – Gio.; Reconstruction – Lecrae; Via Dolorosa – Miles Minnick

=== Rock/Contemporary ===
Rock/Contemporary Recorded Song of the Year	Rock/Contemporary Album of the Year
"Eyes on Him" – Strings & Heart; "Idols" – Stephen Stanley; "**No Survivors**" – Jeremy Camp featuring Skillet; "Sevens" – Brandon Lake; "The Love I Have for You" – Colton Dixon	Asaph's Arrows II – Kings Kaleidoscope; Lonely God – Fit for a King; M Us Eum – Citizens; **Plastic Wine** – Strings & Heart; There Was a Light Here – Demon Hunter

=== Pop/Contemporary ===
Pop/Contemporary Recorded Song of the Year	Pop/Contemporary Album of the Year
"**Dusty Bibles**" – Josiah Queen; "Homesick for Heaven" – Phil Wickham; "Left It in the River" – Jamie MacDonald; "Let It Be a Hallelujah" – Lauren Daigle; "Washed" – Elevation Rhythm	Counting My Blessings – Seph Schlueter; Jamie MacDonald – Jamie MacDonald; **King of Hearts** – Brandon Lake; Mt. Zion – Josiah Queen; Walk Through Fire – Ben Fuller

=== Inspirational ===
Inspirational Recorded Song of the Year
- "Heal for You" – Lloyd Nicks
- "I Speak Jesus" – Karen Peck and New River
- "Make It Well" – MercyMe
- "Psalm 8" – Phil Wickham and Angel
- "**The Blessing**" – Andrea Bocelli, Cody Carnes, and Kari Jobe

=== Southern Gospel ===
Southern Gospel Recorded Song of the Year	Southern Gospel Album of the Year
"Deep Waters" – Triumphant Quartet; "God Gives Good Answers" – Karen Peck and New River; "Hard Trials Will Soon Be Over" – Gaither Vocal Band featuring Chris Blue and Gene McDonald; "**No Rock**" – Jeff & Sheri Easter; "The Church" – Joseph Habedank	Forever – Tribute Quartet; **Good Answers** – Karen Peck and New River; Steadfast Love – The Craguns; Then Came the Morning – Gaither Vocal Band; This Is the Time I Must Sing – The Martins

=== Country/Roots ===
Country/Roots Recorded Song of the Year	Bluegrass/Country/Roots Album of the Year
"Black Sheep" – Ben Fuller; "Broken Man Can" – Scotty Inman; "Speaking Terms" – Ella Langley; "Still Do" – Anne Wilson and Cole Swindell; "**The Jesus I Know Now**" – Brandon Lake and Lainey Wilson	**American Morning: Side A** (EP) – Chosen Road; Folk! – Rend Collective; Full Grown Man, Vol. 1 (EP) – Josh Baldwin; Soul Condition – Darin and Brooke Aldridge; Stars – Anne Wilson

=== Bluegrass ===
Bluegrass Recorded Song of the Year
- "A God Thing" – Chosen Road
- "Above the Clouds" – Eighteen Mile
- "**Broken Angels**" – The Grascals and Dolly Parton
- "Camel Train" – Becky Buller featuring Rickey Skaggs, Sharon White, and Cheryl White
- "I Am the One" – Jeff Tobert and Primitive Road

=== Contemporary Gospel ===
Contemporary Gospel Recorded Song of the Year	Contemporary Gospel Album of the Year
"Already Good (Tasha Slide)" – Tasha Cobbs Leonard; "Imposter Syndrome" – Anthny; "Jesus I Do" – Mariah Carey featuring The Clark Sisters; "**Still**" – Jonathan McReynolds and Jamal Roberts; "Sunday Morning" – Tauren Wells and Pastor Mike Jr.	Closer – Jonathan McReynolds; Confetti and Conspiracies: The Amen Mixtape – Pastor Mike Jr.; Diary Entry 1 (EP) – Anthny; Only on the Road – Tye Tribbett; **Tasha** – Tasha Cobbs Leonard

=== Traditional Gospel ===
Traditional Gospel Recorded Song of the Year	Traditional Gospel Album of the Year
"At the Cross" – CeCe Winans; "**Church**" – Tasha Cobbs Leonard and John Legend; "Love Never Fails" – The Choir Room and Fred Hammond; "Promises" – Lisa Knowles and The Brown Singers; "Your Name" – Jovonta Patton	Jekalyn x the Legends – Jekalyn Carr; Love Never Fails – The Choir Room; **Revival** – Lisa Knowles and The Brown Singers; The Live Reunion – JJ Hairston and Youthful Praise; Trowback: An Evening With John P. Kee Pt. 1 – John P. Kee

=== Gospel Worship ===
Gospel Worship Recorded Song of the Year	Gospel Worship Album of the Year
"Bless Your Name" – Maranda Curtis; "**More Than This**" – CeCe Winans featuring Todd Dulaney; "One Good God" – Jonathan McReynolds; "Something's About to Shift" – Red Worship and Jonathan Stamper; "Yahweh Flow" – Tye Tribbett featuring Jocelyn Bowman, D'nar Young, Jewell Jones, and Jalisa Faye	Greater – Todd Galberth; **Live at Redemption Church** – Red Worship; More Than This – CeCe Winans; Promises: The Best of Todd Dulaney – Todd Dulaney; Soundcheck – VaShawn Mitchell

=== Spanish Language ===
Spanish Language Recorded Song of the Year	Spanish Language Album of the Year
"ABCD" – Daddy Yankee featuring Alex Zurdo; "Christo" – Miel San Marcos, Josh Morales, and Luis Morales Jr.; "Digno" – Nate Diaz featuring Aaron Moses and Israel Houghton; "Necesito a Cristo" – Karen Espinosa; "**Tu Voz**" – Sarai Rivera	Así Será – Elevation Español; Coritos, Vol. 1 – Israel and New Breed; Eterno Dios – Gateway Worship Español; **Lamento en Baile** – Daddy Yankee; Legado – Marcos Witt

=== Spanish Language Worship ===
Spanish Language Worship Recorded Song of the Year
- "El Cel de to Casa" – Tomatulugar and Marcos Brunet
- "Mi Necesidad" – Cales Louima and Christine D'Clario
- "Salvavidas" – Su Presencia
- "**Solo Hay Uno**" – Joel Rocco and Enoc Parra
- "Victoria" – Averly Morillo

=== Worship ===
Worship Recorded Song of the Year	Worship Album of the Year
"**God I'm Just Grateful**" – Elevation Worship and Chandler Moore; "How Good It Is" – Chris Tomlin; "Mighty Name of Jesus" – Hope Darst and Josh Baldwin; "What an Awesome God" – Phil Wickham; "Worthy of It All (Worthy)" – CeCe Winans	A Forgiving God – SEU Worship; Breathe on It – Tauren Wells; So Be It – Elevation Worship; **Song of the Saints** – Phil Wickham; We Must Respond – Bethel Music

=== Children's/Musical/Choral Collection ===
Children's Recorded Song of the Year	Musical/Choral Collection of the Year
"El Amor de Dios" – Marilú y los Niños; "**Follow the Light**" – Brandon Engman, Phil Wickham, and Angel; "Lord Has Mercy" – Matthew West and The Dead Sea Squirrels; "Strong and Courageous" – Gateway Worship featuring Josiah Gonzalez; "This Is My Father's World" – The Getty Girls, Keith Getty, and Kristyn Getty	Big Night in a Small Town – Dave Clark; Forrest Frank Favorites for Kids – Semsen Music; A Child Is Born... All Is Well – Semsen Music; The Name That Changed the World – Hillcrest Nashville; **We Shall Behold Him: A Tribute to Dottie Rambo** – Various Artists

=== Christmas/Special Event ===
Christmas Recorded Song of the Year	Christmas/Special Event Album of the Year
"God's Gift to Us" – Natalie Grant; "Long Expected" – Brandon Heath and Francesca Battistelli; "Our King Has Come" – Katy Nichole and Matt Maher; "The First Noel" – CeCe Winans; "**We Three Kings**" – We Are Messengers	Christmas – Natalie Grant; Come Home for Christmas – Matthew West; **David** – Various Artists; I Can Only Imagine 2 Various Artists; Rejoice! – We Are Messengers

=== Film/Television ===
Feature Film of the Year	Television Series of the Year
A Great Awakening – Joshua Enck; **David** – Brent Dawes and Phil Cunningham; I Can Only Imagine 2 – Andrew Erwin and Brent McCorkle; Sarah's Oil – Cyrus Nowrasteh; Soul on Fire – Sean McNamara	House of David – Jon Erwin; **The Chosen** – Dallas Jenkins; The Promised Land – Mitch Hudson; The Wingfeather Saga – Daniel Haycox, John Sanfod, Keith Lango, Ron Smith, John Wall
