= Leeland (band) =

American Christian rock band

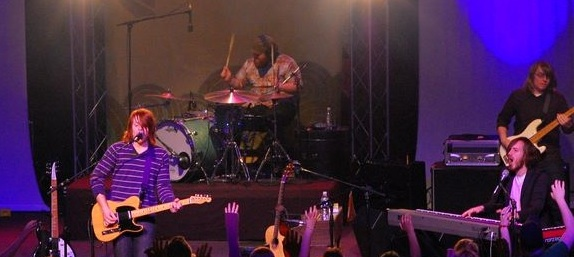
- Leeland in 2007 L-R: Leeland Mooring, Mike Smith, Jack Mooring, Jake Holtz

Background information
- Origin: Baytown, Texas, U.S.
- Genres: Christian rock, CCM, progressive rock
- Years active: 2000–present
- Labels: Essential; Provident Label Group; Sony BMG; Reunion; Bethel Music; Integrity!
- Members: Leeland Mooring; Casey Moore
- Past members: Jake Holtz; Jeremiah Wood; Matt Campbell; Austin Tirado; Jack Mooring; Mike Smith; Shelly Roberts
- Website: leelandonline.com

Leeland is a Christian rock band from Baytown, Texas. The band was formed in 2004, although lead singer Leeland Mooring had been writing songs beforehand. Leeland consists of Leeland Mooring (lead vocals, guitar), and Casey Moore (guitar, background vocals). The band's original line-up included Jeremiah Wood (guitar), who left the band in late 2006 and was replaced by guitarist Matt Campbell in early 2007, Jack Mooring (piano), Mike Smith (drums) and Jake Holtz (bass).

Leeland has released five studio albums, the latest in July 2016. The band received a Grammy Award nomination and two Dove Award nominations for their debut album Sound of Melodies (2006). The band's third album, Love Is on the Move, was released on August 25, 2009.

Leeland's fourth studio album, The Great Awakening, was released on September 20, 2011, and received a nomination to the 54th Grammy Awards for Best Contemporary Christian Music Album.

After a five-year hiatus, Leeland released their fifth studio album in July 2016, Invisible, via the Bethel Music label.

== Band history ==
=== Formation and initial years ===
Lead singer Leeland Mooring wrote his first song, "Shine," at the age of 11. After giving a successful performance of the song at a church in Illinois, the Mooring family began touring the United States. When he was 14, Mooring entered into Embassy Music's Ultimate Talent Search contest in Nashville, Tennessee, becoming a finalist in the songwriting and artist divisions. Although he did not win the competition, one of the contest's judges, Kent Coley, took interest in the young teen. A year later, Eddie DeGarmo, president of EMI CMG Publishing, also expressed interest in Mooring, and the two signed a songwriting contract on EMI/Capitol Music Group. Less than a year later, Leeland Mooring, his older brother Jack Mooring, their cousin Jake Holtz, and friends Jeremiah Wood and Mike Smith, whom the Moorings had known for several years, officially signed as a band onto Essential Records, a subsidiary of Sony BMG's Provident Label Group. The five members began practicing at night after youth group in their church's building, which doubled as a funeral home. Leeland Mooring's first name was used as the band's name because the members said that "it sounded cool".

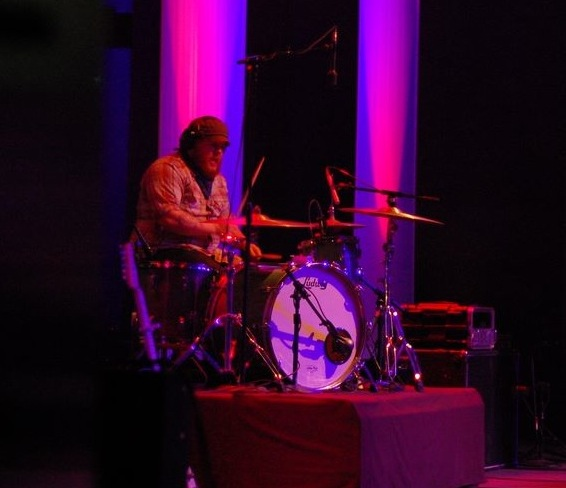
Drummer Mike Smith in 2007

Leeland began recording for their debut release, Sound of Melodies, in 2005, with Matt Bronleewe, Marc Byrd, and Steve Hindalong producing the album. It was released in the United States on August 15, 2006. At the 49th Grammy Awards on December 7, 2006, the album was nominated for Best Pop/Contemporary Gospel Album. In 2007 the band received five GMA Dove Award nominations, including "New Artist of the Year" and two nominations for their debut album Sound of Melodies. The album was also released in Japan on March 21, 2007, with the title song, "Sound of Melodies," peaking at No. 6 on the general Japan radio chart.

The band has worked closely with Christian music legend Michael W. Smith, who remarked, "Leeland is the best thing I have heard in a long, long time". Leeland Mooring co-wrote six songs on Smith's album Stand, and wrote one song by himself. Jack Mooring married Smith's daughter Whitney Smith-Mooring on June 1, 2007.

After four years as a member of Leeland, Jeremiah Wood left the band in October 2006 to pursue other endeavors. Austin Tirado was hired as a temporary guitar player until February 2007. In February, Matt Campbell was hired as a temporary guitarist; he was added as an official band member after three months.

Leeland's second studio album, Opposite Way, was recorded in Nashville, Tennessee. In November 2007, the band announced that the album would release on February 26, 2008. Lead singer Leeland Mooring commented, "[Opposite Way] is primarily a call to our generation to passionately walk the 'opposite way' from the world, that it's OK to live the Christian life and to be on fire for God, even if it makes us look different." In its debut week of release, Opposite Way peaked at No. 72 on the Billboard Top 200 albums chart, and also reached No. 1 on the iTunes Christian Albums chart. Starting in September 2007, Leeland began touring with Grammy Award-winning band Casting Crowns on their The Altar and the Door tour. The tour continued until May 1, 2008, and was named the "highest-grossing Christian tour of the year" touring through 83 cities.

The band's song "Tears of the Saints" from their debut album received two Dove Award nominations in 2008. Lead singer Leeland Mooring was nominated for "Songwriter of the Year" and co-writer of the song "Be Lifted High" with Michael W. Smith.

Their song "Brighter Days," from the Opposite Way album, was featured in the June 22, 2008, episode of the television show Army Wives. The show's music supervisor, Frankie Pine, commented, "We thought the use of 'Brighter Days' in this episode of Army Wives was moving, and was the perfect fit for what we were looking for". The song was also featured on the soundtrack of Fireproof, a film featuring actor Kirk Cameron.

In December 2008, the band's Opposite Way album was nominated for a Grammy Award in the category Best Pop/Contemporary Gospel Album.

Leeland's third studio album, titled Love Is on the Move, was released on August 25, 2009, in the United States. The album's lead single "Follow You", which includes vocals from singer-songwriter Brandon Heath, was released to Christian radio on August 7. In September, the band launched their "Follow You" Tour, co-headlining with Brandon Heath and featuring Francesca Battistelli as an opening act.

=== Changes in membership and label ===
In early 2011, only a few months before the release of their fourth studio album, bassist Jake Holtz left the band to pursue a career with the US Army.

Leeland's fourth studio album, The Great Awakening, was released on September 20, 2011.

In September 2015, Leeland announced via YouTube that they would be joining Bethel Music as part of the Bethel Music Collective, after Leeland Mooring and Casey Moore established an organic friendship with Bethel's founding member, Brian Johnson.

Leeland's fifth studio album, Invisible, was released on July 22, 2016. It is the first album the band has released under the Bethel label, with Brian Johnson featuring on the song "Son Was Lifted Up".

== Musical style ==
Leeland's musical style has been defined as "alternative CCM" and "progressive rock". The band's songs have been defined as "melodic" with "Brit pop/rock" influences, being compared to Coldplay, Keane, Travis and U2.

Their first album, Sound of Melodies, has been described as "sometimes worshipful, always melodic". Leeland's style moved in a more rock direction with their second album Opposite Way. Allmusic reviewer Jared Johnson noted that the band "cemented their sound by creating electrifying walls of guitar" with their second release, having the same "energetic and melodic" sound as their first album. Of their third album Love Is on the Move, Christian youth magazine StreetBrand said the album shows "just how much they have matured musically as a group, creatively as songwriters and spiritually as a band with a penchant for God-pleasing worship."

== Band members ==
- Leeland Dayton Mooring – lead vocals, guitar
- Casey Moore - lead guitar, background vocals

Touring musicians

- Josias Badillo - bass guitar
- Payden Hilliard - drums
- David Ramirez - keys

Former members

- Jake Holtz – bass (2004–2011)
- Matt Campbell - guitar (2007–2009)
- Austin Tirado - guitar (2006–2007)
- Jeremiah Wood – guitar (2002–2006)
- Jack Anthony Mooring – backing vocals, keyboard (2004-2015)
- Shelly Roberts – bass (2011-2015)
- Mike Smith – drums (2004-2015)
- Jon Finney - backing vocals, guitar (2014-2015)

== Awards ==
Grammy Award nominations

- 2007: Best Pop/Contemporary Gospel Album – Sound of Melodies
- 2009: Best Pop/Contemporary Gospel Album – Opposite Way
- 2010: Best Pop/Contemporary Gospel Album - Love Is on the Move
- 2011: Best Contemporary Christian Album - The Great Awakening

GMA Dove Award nominations

- 2007: New Artist of the Year
- 2007: Rock/Contemporary Recorded Song of the Year – "Sound of Melodies"
- 2007: Worship Song of the Year – "Yes You Have"
- 2007: Praise & Worship Album of the Year – Sound of Melodies
- 2007: Rock/Contemporary Album of the Year – Sound of Melodies
- 2008: Song of the Year – "Tears of the Saints"
- 2008: Pop/Contemporary Recorded Song of the Year – "Tears of the Saints"
- 2009: Praise & Worship Album of the Year – Opposite Way

== Discography ==
Leeland discography
- Studio albums: 5
- Extended plays: 2
- Singles: 11
- Music videos: 2

=== Studio albums ===
Year	Title	Label(s)	Chart positions			
Year	Title	Label(s)	US	US Heat.	US Christ.	NZ
2006	Sound of Melodies	Essential	—	2	14	—
2008	Opposite Way	Essential	72	—	4	—
2009	Love Is on the Move	Reunion	84	—	5	21
2011	The Great Awakening	Essential	164	—	11	—
2016	Invisible	Bethel	200	—	5	—
2023	City of God					

=== Live albums ===
Year	Title	Label(s)	Chart positions		
Year	Title	Label(s)	US	US Christ.	NZ
2019	Better Word	Integrity	—	33	—

=== Other albums ===
- 2006: Sound of Melodies – five-song 12-inch limited edition vinyl – (Essential Records)
- 2010: Majesty: The Worship EP – three-song EP – (Essential Records)
- 2014: Leeland Live: Christ Be All Around Me – live album – (Awaken Nation Music)

=== Singles ===
Year	Title	Peak chart positions	Certifications	Album
2006	"Sound of Melodies"			Sound of Melodies
2006	"Tears of the Saints"			Sound of Melodies
2006	"Yes You Have"			Sound of Melodies
2007	"Reaching"			Sound of Melodies
2007	"Count Me In"	No. 10 on CHR Radio (March 5, 2008)		Opposite Way
2008	"Opposite Way"			Opposite Way
2009	"Follow You" (featuring Brandon Heath)	No. 18 Billboard Hot Christian Songs		Love Is on the Move
2010	"New Creation"			Love Is on the Move
2011	"The Great Awakening"			The Great Awakening
2011	"I Wonder"			The Great Awakening
2019	"Way Maker"	No. 3 Billboard Christian Digital Song Sales; No. 9 Billboard Hot Christian Songs	RIAA: Gold; RMNZ: Gold	Better Word
2023	"You're Not Done" (Featuring Kari Jobe)			You're Not Done

=== Music videos ===
- "Sound of Melodies"
- "Count Me In"

=== Compilation appearances ===
- 2006: WOW Hits 2007 - "Sound of Melodies" (EMI)
- 2007: X2008 – "Reaching" (BEC Recordings)
- 2007: WOW Hits 2008 - "Tears of the Saints" (EMI)
- 2008: WOW Hits 2009 - "Count Me In" (EMI)
- 2009: Fireproof Original Motion Picture Soundtrack - "Brighter Days" (Reunion Records)
- 2010: WOW Hits 2011 - "Follow You" (featuring Brandon Heath)
- 2011: WOW Hits 2012 - "I Wonder"
