= GMN =

GMN may refer to:

== Transport ==
- Goregaon railway station, in Mumbai, India
- Great Missenden railway station, in England
- Greymouth Airport, in New Zealand
- Gulf, Mobile and Northern Railroad, an American railway

== Places ==
- General Mamerto Natividad

== Other uses ==
- Gimnime language
- Global Model Number
- Gospel Music Network
