= Sons of Sunday (album) =

Studio album by Sons of Sunday
- Released: May 16, 2025
- Genres: Worship; Christian/gospel
- Length: 53:17
- Labels: Elevation Worship Records; Provident Label Group
- Producers: Chris Brown; Jonathan Smith

Sons of Sunday chronology
I Looked Up / One More Day (2025)	Sons of Sunday (2025)

Singles from Sons of Sunday
- 1. "God Did!" Released: January 17, 2025; 2. "Runnin With Angels" Released: January 17, 2025; 3. "I Looked Up" Released: February 28, 2025; 4. "One More Day" Released: February 28, 2025; 5. "Exchange" Released: April 11, 2025; 6. "Pray Mama" Released: May 9, 2025

Sons of Sunday is the self-titled debut studio album by American Christian worship collective Sons of Sunday. The album was released on May 16, 2025, through Elevation Worship Records and Provident Label Group, onto LP, digital download, and streaming formats.

== Release and promotion ==
The first singles to be released were "God Did!" and "Runnin With Angels", both released on January 17, 2025. On February 28, 2025, Sons of Sunday's debut extended play, I Looked Up / One More Day was released, featuring four songs later featured on the album. On April 11, 2025, the fifth single of the album was released, "Exchange".

== Commercial performance ==
Sons of Sunday debuted at its peak position of No. 44 on the OCC UK Album Downloads, and No. 10 on the UK Official Christian & Gospel Albums. On the Billboard Top Current Album Sales, the album hit No. 44 and on the Top Christian Albums it went to No. 3.

The song "God Did!" peaked at No. 13 on the Billboard Hot Christian Songs chart. The song peaked at an additional No. 4 on the Christian Digital and No. 24 on the Christian Streaming charts. The song "Runnin With Angels" peaked at No. 11 on the Christian Digital chart. "Exchange" reached No. 41 on the Hot Christian Songs.

On the Billboard Top Christian Albums, the extended play I Looked Up / One More Day peaked at No. 32. The eponymously named song "I Looked Up" peaked at No. 48 on the Hot Christian Songs. "One More Day" achieved No. 39 on the same chart, as well as No. 10 on the Christian Digital.

== Accolades ==
Year	Organization	Category	Result	Ref.
2026	Dove Awards	Long Form Music Video of the Year	Nominated	

== Track listing ==
No.	Title	Writer(s)	Producer(s)	Length
1.	"God Did!"	Brandon Lake; Steven Furtick; Chandler Moore; Chris Brown; E. Edwards; Joshua Holiday; Leeland Mooring; Pat Barrett	Chris Brown; Jonathan Smith	4:41
2.	"Runnin With Angels"	Brandon Lake; Jonathan Smith; Steven Furtick; Leeland Mooring; Pat Barrett	Jonathan Smith; Chris Brown	5:07
3.	"I Looked Up"	Brandon Lake; Steven Furtick; Chandler Moore; Chris Brown; Leeland Mooring; Mitch Wong; Pat Barrett	Chris Brown; Jonathan Smith	5:06
4.	"W.D.H.D?"	Brandon Lake; Steven Furtick; Benjamin William Hastings; Chandler Moore; Christ Brown; Leeland Mooring; Pat Barrett	Christ Brown; Jonathan Smith	2:09
5.	"One More Day"	Chris Davenport; Jonathan Smith; Steven Furtick; Chandler Moore; Leeland Mooring	Jonathan Smith; Chris Brown	7:15
6.	"Pray Mama"	Jason Ingram; Steven Furtick; Bear Rinehart; Chris Brown	Chris Brown; Jonathan Smith	3:15
7.	"Pray On"	Brandon Lake; Jason Ingram; Jonathan Smith; Steven Furtick; Bear Rinehart; Chandler Moore; Chris Brown; Leeland Mooring; Pat Barrett	Chris Brown; Jonathan Smith	2:03
8.	"Exchange"	Steven Furtick; Chandler Moore	Chris Brown; Jonathan Smith	6:35
9.	"All Back"	Ben Fielding; Chris Brown; Mitch Wong; Steven Furtick	Christ Brown; Jonathan Smith	3:58
10.	"Miracle on Your Mind"	Chris Davenport; Jonathan Smith; Leeland Mooring; Steven Furtick	Christ Brown; Jonathan Smith	4:11
11.	"Higher Than I"	Brandon Lake; Steven Furtick; Chris Brown; Mitch Wong	Christ Brown; Jonathan Smith	4:18
12.	"Holyghost"	Brandon Lake; Jonathan Smith; Steven Furtick	Christ Brown; Jonathan Smith	4:38
Total length:				53:17

== Personnel ==
Adapted from AllMusic.

- Aaron Robertson – programmer
- Bear Rinehart – composer, guitar
- Ben Fielding – composer
- Benjamin Hastings – composer
- Billy Justineau – piano
- Brandon Lake – composer, acoustic guitar, lead vocalist, background vocals
- Chandler Moore – composer, drum, lead vocalist, percussion, piano, background vocals
- Chris Brown – composer, acoustic guitar, lead vocalist, percussion, piano, producer, background vocals
- Chris Davenport – composer
- Courtlan Clement – electric guitar
- Drew Lavyne – mastering, engineer
- Eddie Edwards – bass guitar, composer, guitar, background vocals
- Ezra Fredette – keyboards, programming
- Graham King – engineer
- Hutch Deibler – bass, guitar, horn, keyboard, percussion, programmer
- Jason Ingram – composer
- Jonathan Mix – engineer, guitar, horn, percussion, programming
- Jonathan Smith – banjo, composer, engineer, acoustic guitar, keyboard, organ, percussion, piano, producer, programming, background vocals
- Joshua Holliday – composer, engineer
- Leeland Mooring – bass, composer, guitar, keyboards, lead vocalist, piano, background vocals
- LJ Mitchell – organ
- Luke Skaggs – acoustic guitar, programming
- Mitch Wong – composer, background vocals
- Pat Barrett – composer, lead vocalist, background vocals
- Samuel Gibson – mixing, engineer
- Scott Murray – steel guitar, slide guitar
- Shae Wooten – bass
- Steven Furtick – composer, executive producer, lead vocalist, background vocals
- Tai Mahawon – engineer
- Vincent Baynard – drums, percussion
- William Oakley – engineer

== Charts ==
Chart performance for Sons of Sunday
Chart (2025)	Peak position
UK Album Downloads (Official Charts)	44
UK Christian & Gospel (OCC)	10
US Top Christian Albums (Billboard)	3
US Top Current Album Sales (Billboard)	44
