= Mt. Zion (album) =

Studio album by Josiah Queen
- Released: August 22, 2025
- Genres: AC/inspo; acoustic; Americana; Christian/gospel; country; folk; folk pop; folk rock
- Length: 38:51
- Labels: Josiah Queen Music; Capitol CMG; F&L Music Group
- Producers: John Michael Howell; Zac Lawson; Josiah Queen; Jacob Sooter; Hank Bentley; Jared Marc

Josiah Queen chronology
The Prodigal (2024)	Mt. Zion (2025)

Singles from Mt. Zion
- 1. "Can't Steal My Joy" Released: January 10, 2025; 2. "Yesterday Is Dead" Released: March 14, 2025; 3. "Two Wooden Beams" Released: May 16, 2025; 4. "Dusty Bibles" Released: June 20, 2025; 5. "Cloud and Fire" Released: July 29, 2025; 6. "I'll Fly Away" Released: August 8, 2025

Alternative cover
- Exclusive vinyl cover

Mt. Zion is the second studio album by American folk rock musician Josiah Queen, released on August 22, 2025, via Josiah Queen Music, Capitol Christian Music Group, and F&L Music Group. The album features guest appearances from Brandon Lake, Benjamin William Hastings, and Gable Price. Production for the album was handled by John Michael Howell, Zac Lawson, Josiah Queen, Jacob Sooter, Hank Bentley, and Jared Marc.

The album was supported by the release of "Can't Steal My Joy", "Yesterday Is Dead", "Two Wooden Beams", "Cloud and Fire", and "I'll Fly Away", and "Dusty Bibles" as singles.

== Release and promotion ==
The lead single off Mt. Zion was "Can't Steal My Joy", released on January 10, 2025, featuring guest vocals from Grammy-winning singer-songwriter Brandon Lake. Several teasers to the song were released to social media predating the song's release, achieving a combined three million views. On DSPs, the song accumulated 12.5 million digital streams within three months of release. On January 9, 2025, an official music video was released, featuring song lyrics. Queen said about the song that it, "came from the idea that our joy isn't dependent on the situations we face in our lives".

Following the release of "Can't Steal My Joy", Queen released the album's second single, "Yesterday Is Dead" on March 14, 2025. He spoke about it, saying, "Yesterday is Dead feels like a weight being lifted off of my back. This song is all about the freedom and new life I have found in Jesus. I have lived through times with regrets of the past and this song came from the release of those cares." Teasers from the song surpassed three million views, and both a music video and lyric video were released. On Easter Sunday of that year, the song was performed on the Fox News channel Fox & Friends. "Yesterday is Dead" gave Queen his highest ever streaming debut without a feature. Within two months, the song achieved nine million global streams and 22 million short form video views.

On May 16, 2025, the album's third single was released, titled "Two Wooden Beams". In support of the song's release, an official music video was released. Queen spoke about the song and its inspiration, saying, "I spent a long time searching for love and I finally found it – on two wooden beams where God gave everything for me. His sacrifice taught me that love is much more about sacrifice than it is a feeling."

On June 20, 2025, Queen released a single titled "Dusty Bibles", which he deemed as "one of the most honest songs I’ve ever dropped". Alongside the song's release, he announced Mt. Zion as his second album, slated for release on August 22, 2025.

The album's fourth single, "Cloud and Fire", was released on July 29, 2025, described as being a "gentle, emotional track". Queen spoke about the song saying, "I wrote Cloud and Fire after reading about the story of Moses and the Israelites journeying through the desert, led by a pillar of cloud in the day and a pillar of fire at night. It’s a reminder of God’s steadfast guidance through every trial," referencing the Biblical story of The Exodus. The single was supported by the release of an official lyric video.

On August 8, 2025, "I'll Fly Away", a collaboration with Benjamin William Hastings, was released as the fifth single from Mt. Zion. The song was supported by an official lyrics video.

Predating the album's release, five tracks were released exclusively to Air1 radio stations, including "The Meaning of Life" on August 18, 2025, "Adonai (Lord of My Life)" on August 19, "Watch Your Mouth" on August 20, "Slow Down, Please" on August 21, and the title track, "Mt. Zion", on August 22.

Queen will perform two headlining album release shows, including at the Ryman Auditorium in Nashville, Tennessee, on October 27, 2025, and at the Yuengling Center in Tampa, Florida, on November 1. Both shows will perform the album's full setlist.

== Style ==
Lindsay Williams of K-Love observed that, similar to Queen's The Prodigal (2024), Mt. Zion writing contains "honest, conviting delivery" and "acoustic-grounded sound", building on its predecessor's "Americana-threaded storytelling". The album is characterized by "rich storytelling" and "definitive folk-pop stylings", in which Queen writes lyrics inspired by various Bible passages. Jesus Freak Hideout observed the album to be folk, nu-folk, and country.

Mt. Zion demonstrates the styles of Christian/gospel and AC/Inspo, folk, folk rock, and country.

== Tours ==
The Mt. Zion Tour, featuring Jervis Campbell and Gable Price, will begin on March 7 and last until May 8, 2026. The tour will visit thirty-one locations in the United States, making it Queen's biggest headlining tour.

== Reception ==
Professional ratings
Review scores
Source	Rating
AllMusic	2.5/5 stars
Jesus Freak Hideout	3.5/5 stars
Jubilee Cast	3.75/5 stars

=== Critical ===
AllMusic’s Marcy Donelson scored the album two-and-a-half stars describing it as “Not an album for a reflective Sunday afternoon but rather one for encouragement of both a physical and spiritual kind”.Josh Balogh of Jesus Freak Hideout awarded Mt. Zion a 3.5-out-of-5 star review, identifying Queen's "authentic lyrics" and "folk-infused sound". He recognized that the album features a "stomp and shout" template, criticizing its lack of diversity. Speaking for Jubilee Cast, Timothy Yap praised the album for being more "rustic" than the average Christian music's "slick, synth-layered worship ballads". However, he stated that "the record is not without flaws", observing that, "the country-folk approach is refreshing, but its repeated application across 12 tracks can feel a bit draining". He credited the album with a 3.75-out-of-5 star review.

=== Commercial ===
Selling 15,000 equivalent album sales within its first week, Mt. Zion debuted at No. 22 on the Official Charts Company UK Americana Albums and No. 8 on the Christian/Gospel Albums charts. In the US, the album debuted at No. 57 on the Billboard 200, No. 1 on the Top Christian Albums, No. 4 on the Americana/Folk Albums, and No. 12 on the Top Rock & Alternative Albums.

The lead single from Mt. Zion, "Can't Steal My Joy", hit No. 38 on the Billboard Hot Rock & Alternative Songs chart, No. 10 on the Hot Christian Songs chart, and No. 10 on the Christian Airplay chart. The following single, "Yesterday Is Dead", charted at No. 25 on the Hot Christian Songs chart, with "Two Wooden Beams" hitting No. 19 on the same chart.

"Dusty Bibles" peaked at No. 17 on the Hot Rock & Alternative Songs, No. 3 on the Hot Christian Songs, No. 28 on the Christian Airplay, and No. 6 on the Bubbling Under Hot 100. The song notably marks Queen's first top 10 debut onto the Hot Christian Songs chart. "Cloud and Fire" peaked at No. 28 on the Hot Christian Songs, and "I'll Fly Away" hit No. 25.

=== Accolades ===
Year	Organization	Category	Result	Ref.
2026	Dove Awards	Pop/Contemporary Album of the Year	Nominated	
2026	Dove Awards	Recording Music Packaging of the Year	Won	

Year-end lists
Publication	Accolade	Rank	Ref.
Jesus Freak Hideout	Alex Caldwell's Album Picks of 2025	9	
Jesus Freak Hideout	Grace Graber's Album Picks of 2025	8	
New Release Today	Top 10 Albums of 2025	Unordered	

== Track listing ==
No.	Title	Writer(s)	Producer(s)	Length
1.	"Yesterday Is Dead"	John Michael Howell; Josiah Queen; Zac Lawson	John Michael Howell; Josiah Queen; Zac Lawson	2:45
2.	"Watch Your Mouth"	Elijah Queen; Jared Marc; Josiah Queen; Romeo Barela	Jared Marc	3:42
3.	"Can't Steal My Joy" (featuring Brandon Lake)	Brandon Lake; Hank Bentley; Jacob Sooter; Josiah Queen	Jacob Sooter	3:33
4.	"Two Wooden Beams"	John Michael Howell; Josiah Queen; Zac Lawson	John Michael Howell	3:21
5.	"Mt. Zion"	Josiah Queen	Jared Marc	2:45
6.	"Dusty Bibles"	Dylan Thomas; John Michael Howell; Josiah Queen; Zac Lawson	John Michael Howell	3:10
7.	"Cloud and Fire"	Dylan Thomas; John Michael Howell; Josiah Queen; Zac Lawson	John Michael Howell	2:57
8.	"Slow Down, Please"	Jared Marc; Joel Houston; Josiah Queen	Jared Marc	3:44
9.	"I'll Fly Away" (with Benjamin William Hastings)	Benjamin William Hastings; John Michael Howell; Josiah Queen; Zac Lawson	Hank Bentley	3:00
10.	"The Meaning of Life"	Angelo Espinosa; Josiah Queen	Ben Foster	3:27
11.	"Thief in the Night" (with Gable Price)	Angelo Espinosa; Gable Price; Josiah Queen	Ben Foster; Gable Price	3:20
12.	"Adonai (Lord of My Life)"	Jared Marc; Josiah Queen	Jared Marc	3:00
Total length:				38:51

== Personnel ==
Credits adapted from liner notes and Tidal Music.

Writing and production

- Angelo Espinosa – writer (10–11)
- Ben Foster – producer (10–11)
- Benjamin William Hastings – writer (9)
- Brandon Lake – writer (3)
- Doug Weier – mixing engineer (6, 8, 12)
- Dylan Thomas – writer (6–7)
- Elijah Queen – writer (2)
- Gable Price – producer (11), writer (11)
- Hank Bentley – producer (3, 9), writer (3), engineer (3), programming (3)
- Jacob Scooter – producer (3), writer (3), engineer (3), programming (3)
- Jared Marc – producer (2, 5, 8, 12), writer (2, 8, 12), mixing engineer (2, 5)
- Jeff Robert Agency – booking
- Joel Houston – writer (8)
- John Michael Howell – producer (1, 4, 6–7), writer (1, 4, 6, 9), mixing engineer (1, 4, 7)
- Josh Bonanno – mixing engineer (10–11)
- Josiah Queen – producer (1), writer
- Matt Huber – mixing engineer (3, 9)
- Mike Cervantes – mastering engineer (1–2, 4–12)
- Pete Mol – digital editing engineer (3)
- Romeo Barela – writer (2)
- Sam Moses – mastering engineer (3)
- Zac Lawson – producer (1), writer (1, 4, 6–7, 9), sound effects (1, 4)

Musicians

- Aaron Sterling – percussion (3)
- Benjamin Bledsoe – organ (1, 4)
- Brandon Lake – lead vocals (3), background vocals (3)
- Hank Bentley – acoustic guitar (3), background vocals (3), banjo (3), bass (3), bousouki (3), electric guitar (3), organ (3), synthesizer (3)
- Jacob Sooter – piano (3), synthesizer (3)
- John Michael Howell – acoustic guitar (1, 4), background vocals (1, 4), banjo (1, 4), percussion (1, 4), piano (1, 4)
- Josiah Queen – lead vocals, acoustic guitar (3), background vocals (3), percussion (3)
- Zac Lawson – background vocals (1, 4), piano (1, 4), strings (1, 4)

Artwork and design

- Aaron Stearns – creative director, cover artwork, packaging design
- Ras Ludgood – photography

== Charts ==
=== Weekly ===
Weekly chart performance for Mt. Zion
Chart (2025)	Peak position
UK Americana Albums (Official Charts)	22
UK Christian & Gospel Albums (Official Charts)	8
US Billboard 200	57
US Americana/Folk Albums (Billboard)	4
US Top Christian Albums (Billboard)	1
US Top Rock Albums (Billboard)	10

=== Year-end ===
Year-end chart performance for Mt. Zion
Chart (2025)	Position
US Top Christian Albums (Billboard)	42
