= Plans (Brandon Lake song) =

Song by Brandon Lake

from the album King of Hearts
- Released: June 13, 2025
- Length: 3:47
- Label: Provident Label Group; Sony Music Entertainment
- Songwriters: Brandon Lake; Jacob Sooter; Hank Bentley; Jordan Colle
- Producers: Hank Bentley; Jacob Sooter

Music video
- "Plans" (lyrics) on YouTube

"Plans" is a song by American singer-songwriter Brandon Lake, appearing on his fifth studio album, King of Hearts (2025). The song is written by Lake, Jacob Sooter, Hank Bentley, and Jordan Colle.

== Writing and composition ==
Running 3 minutes and 45 seconds, "Plans" is in key of C, with a time signature of 6/8 and a speed of 84 beats per minute.

The song was cowritten by Lake, Sooter, Bentley, and Colle, while Sooter and Bentley produced. Daniel Mackenzie and Pete Mol edited the song, Matt Huber mixed, and Sam Moses mastered. Aaron Sterling, Bentley, Sooter, and Mol acted as recording engineer.

=== Style ===
Jasmin Patterson described the song, explaining that, it "opens with a Country-sounding finger-picked guitar line that grabs your ear, keeps your attention when a more worship/contemporary sound fills in the sonic space, and immediately hits your heart with a lyric that is powerful and poetic." Lindsay Williams favored the song's acoustic sound, noting that it is "tailor-made for a contemporary church setting". She stated that it leans into Jeremiah 29:11, which reads:

For I know the plans that I have for you, says the Lord,

plans for peace and not for evil, to give you a future and a hope.

== Critical reception ==
"Plans" was generally favored by critics upon release, lauded for its acoustic sound, with some critics referring it as the best song from King of Hearts.

Lindsay Williams of Air1 praised the song's acoustic sound. In a similar vein, Jasmin Patterson of New Release Today stated that, "In an era when there's a lot of electronic instrumentation in music (which is not necessarily a bad thing), anytime I hear a real instrument on a record I'm immediately paying attention", labelling it as the best song from King of Hearts.

Jesus Freak Hideout's Josh Balogh signalled the song as "radio-ready" and "acoustic-driven", being "tailor made for Sunday mornings". He elaborated that, "its warm, congregational vibe sets a high bar". K-Love credited it as one of the album's best songs, stating that it "offers a nod to Joseph’s journey from the pit to the palace".

== Release and promotion ==
In early June 2025, five songs intended for upcoming release by Lake were played non-consecutively on the Air1 radio station. "Plans" was one of the five, played on June 11. On June 13, 2025, the song was officially released as the opening track from Lake's album, King of Hearts.

=== Publishing ===
"Plans" was released under the record labels of Provident Label Group and Sony Music Entertainment. The song was published under Just When Publishing, So Essential Tunes, Brandon Lake Music, Capitol CMG, and Jordan Colle Music. Just When and So Essential each hold 12.5% of copyright ownership, while Brandon Lake, Capitol CMG, and Jordan Colle each hold 25%. The song is administered by Essential Records.

== Personnel ==
Adapted from Tidal.

- Aaron Sterling – drums, percussion, recording engineer
- Ben Smith – background vocals
- Benjamin William Hastings – background vocals
- Brandon Lake – main artist, composer, acoustic guitar, electric guitar
- Daniel Mackenzie – editor
- Hank Bentley – producer, composer, acoustic guitar, background vocals, electric guitar, recording engineer
- Jacob Sooter – producer, composer, keyboards, organ, programmer, recording engineer
- Jordan Colle – composer
- Matt Huber – mixing engineer
- Pat Barrett – background vocals
- Pete Mol – bass guitar, editor, keyboards, programmer, recording engineer
- Sam Moses – mastering engineer
- Scott Murray – steel guitar

== Charts ==
Chart performance for "Plans"
| Chart (2025) | Peak position |
|---|---|
| US Hot Christian Songs (Billboard) | 27 |

== Release history ==
Release history for "Plans"
| Region | Release | Date | Format | Label | Ref. |
|---|---|---|---|---|---|
| Various | King of Hearts | June 13, 2025 | CD; LP; Digital download; streaming | Provident Label Group; Sony Music Entertainment | |
