= King of Hearts (Brandon Lake song) =

2025 song by Brandon Lake

Song by Brandon Lake

from the album King of Hearts
- Released: June 13, 2025
- Genre: Pop; praise/worship; Christian/gospel
- Length: 4:28
- Label: Provident Label Group; Sony Music Entertainment
- Songwriters: Brandon Lake; Jacob Sooter; Hank Bentley
- Producers: Jacob Sooter; Hank Bentley

Music videos
- "King of Hearts" on YouTube
- "King of Hearts" (Lyrics) on YouTube

"King of Hearts" is a song by American singer-songwriter Brandon Lake, appearing as the title track from his fifth studio album, King of Hearts (2025). The song was released on June 13, 2025, through Provident Label Group and Sony Music Entertainment. It was cowritten by Lake, Jacob Sooter, and Hank Bentley, with Sooter and Bentley producing. With the song's release, both a music video and a lyric video were released.

== Writing and development ==
"King of Hearts" is in the key of D. With a speed of 87 beats per minute and a time signature of 6/8, the song clocks in at 4 minutes and 28 seconds. Lake said of the song,

It's not for the seemingly put together, but for those honest about their brokenness, longing to connect with their Creator. He is King of the universe, nations, creation-but most of all, King of hearts.

Lake cowrote "King of Hearts" alongside Jacob Sooter and Hank Bentley, while Sooter and Bentley produced. The song was mastered by Sam Moses and mixed by Matt Huber. Dave Cook and Pete Mol served as editors. The song reflects the genres of pop, praise/worship, and Christian contemporary, with themes around forgiveness and grace.

== Reception ==
=== Critical ===
Speaking for Air1, Lindsay Williams reviewed that "King of Hearts" is "characterized by a vulnerable, mid-tempo vibe", with "traditional moments". Country Music Nation labelled it as a standout track from the album.

Jasmine Patterson of New Release Today reviews that the song's main focus is "singing the truth of the gospel message in the form of testimony--the cross, grace, salvation, and how Jesus wins our hearts". Furthermore, she elaborated, explaining that this is "the height of captivating poetry and imagery on an album that already does that so well". Patterson also labelled the bridge as "one of the best bridges I've heard".

=== Accolades ===
Year-end lists
Publication	Accolade	Rank	Ref.
Air1	Air1 Unwrapped 2025	20	

== Release and promotion ==
"King of Hearts" was first revealed on April 2, 2025, where it was performed at Riviera Theatre in Charleston, South Carolina. On June 10, the song received airplay on the Air1 radio station. On June 13, 2025, the song was initially released, alongside an album of the same name.

=== Publishing ===
"King of Hearts" was released under the labels of Provident Label Group and Sony Music Entertainment. The song was published by Brandon Lake Music, Just When Publishing, So Essential Tunes, and Capitol Christian Music Group. Lake and Capitol CMG each hold 33.33% of the song's ownership while Just When and So Essential each hold 16.67%. The song is administered by Essential Records.

== Personnel ==
Adapted from Tidal.

- Aaron Sterling – drums, percussion, recording engineer
- Brandon Lake – main artist, composer, background vocals
- David Cook – editor
- Hank Bentley – producer, composer, acoustic guitar, bass guitar, bouzouki, electric guitar, recording engineer, steel guitar
- Jacob Sooter – producer, composer, background vocals, electric guitar, programmer, recording engineer
- Matt Huber – mixing engineer
- Pete Mol – editor
- Sam Moses – mastering engineer

== Charts ==
=== Weekly ===
Weekly hart performance for "King of Hearts"
Chart (2025–2026)	Peak position
UK Christian Songs (Cross Rhythms)	2
US Hot Christian Songs (Billboard)	12
US Christian Airplay (Billboard)	28
US Hot Rock & Alternative Songs (Billboard)	46

=== Year-end ===
Year-end chart performance for "King of Hearts"
Chart (2025)	Position
US Hot Christian Songs (Billboard)	75

== Release history ==
Release history for "King of Hearts"
Region	Release	Date	Format	Label	Ref.
Various	King of Hearts	June 13, 2025	CD; LP; digital download; streaming	Provident Label Group; Sony Music Entertainment	
