= The Great Awakening (album) =

Studio album by Leeland
- Released: September 20, 2011
- Genre: Contemporary Christian
- Length: 55:04
- Label: Essential
- Producer: Paul Moak

Leeland chronology
Love Is on the Move (2009)	The Great Awakening (2011)	Invisible (2016)

The Great Awakening is the fourth studio album from the Christian rock band Leeland, released on September 20, 2011. The Great Awakening received a nomination to the 54th Grammy Awards for Best Contemporary Christian Music Album.

== Track listing ==
Album release
No.	Title	Writer(s)	Length
1.	"The Great Awakening"	Leeland Mooring	3:05
2.	"All Over the Earth"	Jack Mooring, L. Mooring	8:35
3.	"Chains Hit the Ground"	J. Mooring, L. Mooring, Shelly Mooring, Michael Dewayne Smith	4:50
4.	"I Can See Your Love"	J. Mooring, L. Mooring	5:16
5.	"I Wonder"	L. Mooring	5:25
6.	"Pages"	Paul Moak, J. Mooring, L. Mooring	3:37
7.	"Not Afraid Anymore"	J. Mooring, L. Mooring, S. Mooring, Smith	5:20
8.	"I Cry"	J. Mooring, L. Mooring	6:02
9.	"Holy Ghost"	J. Mooring, L. Mooring	3:51
10.	"While We Sing"	Moak, J. Mooring, L. Mooring	4:08
11.	"Unending Songs"	Moak, J. Mooring, L. Mooring	4:55
Total length:			55:17

== Personnel ==
Leeland

- Leeland Mooring – vocals, acoustic piano, acoustic guitars, electric guitars, mandolin, vibraphone
- Jack Mooring – keyboards, acoustic piano, tack piano, Hammond B3 organ, pump organ, vocals
- Shelly Mooring – bass, vocals
- Mike Smith – drums, percussion, vocals

Additional musicians

- Paul Moak – Hammond B3 organ, programming, acoustic guitars, electric guitars, tenor guitar, pedal steel guitar, sampling, vocals
- Todd Mooring – Hammond B3 organ
- Claire Indie – cello, strings, string arrangements
- Eleanor Deonig – violin, strings, string arrangements
- Ben Brown – vocals
- Josh Brown – vocals
- Heather Christian – vocals
- Leslie Eiler – vocals
- Matthew Faulkenberry – vocals
- Ashley Goins – vocals
- Cammie Hall – vocals
- Dana Jorgensen – vocals
- Tom Loschiavo – vocals
- Jason McArthur – vocals
- Cindy Mooring – vocals
- Roxanne Nichols – vocals
- Melissa Seueogru – vocals
- Jamie Smyth – vocals
- Matt Swaringim – vocals
- Brady Troops – vocals
- Kristin Watson – vocals
- Abby Wood – vocals

=== Production ===
- Jason McArthur – executive producer
- Paul Moak – producer, engineer, mixing
- Andy Hunt – mixing
- Justin March – assistant engineer
- Dewey Boyd – assistant engineer
- Mark Santangelo – assistant engineer
- Devin Vaughan – assistant engineer
- Vlado Meller – mastering
- Jason Root – A&R
- Michelle Box – A&R production
- Beth Lee – art direction
- Tim Parker – art direction, design
- Allister Ann – photography
- Mike Jay – photography
- Samantha Roe – wardrobe stylist
- Melanie Shelley – hair stylist, make-up

== Singles ==
- "The Great Awakening"
- "I Wonder"
- "Pages"
