= Sound of Melodies =

Studio album by Leeland
- Released: August 15, 2006
- Studio: Pentavarit (Nashville, Tennessee): Sound Kitchen (Franklin, Tennessee)
- Genre: Christian rock
- Length: 47:39
- Label: Essential
- Producer: Matt Bronleewe: Steve Hindalong; Marc Byrd

Leeland chronology
Sound of Melodies (2006)	Opposite Way (2008)

Professional ratings
Review scores
Source	Rating
Jesus Freak Hideout	4.5/5 stars
AllMusic	4/5 stars

Sound of Melodies is the debut album from Christian band Leeland released in August 2006 on Essential Records.

== Track listing ==
Album release
No.	Title	Writer(s)	Length
1.	"Sound of Melodies"	Jack Mooring, Leeland Mooring, Steve Wilson	5:01
2.	"Reaching"	J. Mooring, L. Mooring, S. Wilson	3:25
3.	"Yes You Have"	Matt Bronleewe, J. Mooring, L. Mooring	4:23
4.	"Tears of the Saints"	J. Mooring, L. Mooring	6:18
5.	"Beautiful Lord"	Marc Byrd, L. Mooring	4:29
6.	"Can't Stop"	Steve Hindalong, L. Mooring	3:38
7.	"Lift Your Eyes"	Hindalong, L. Mooring, Mike Smith	3:02
8.	"Hey"	J. Mooring, L. Mooring, S. Wilson	3:35
9.	"Too Much"	Byrd, Hindalong, David Stukenberg, L. Mooring	3:46
10.	"How Wonderful"	Byrd, Hindalong, L. Mooring	4:13
11.	"Carried to the Table"	Byrd, Hindalong, L. Mooring	5:45
12.	"Poetry in Motion (Japanese Exclusive Track)"		3:04
Total length:			50:05 (53:09)

== Personnel ==
Leeland

- Leeland Mooring – lead vocals, guitars, handclaps (8)
- Jack Mooring – keyboards, vocals, handclaps (8)
- Jeremiah Wood – lead guitars
- Jake Holtz – bass
- Mike Smith – drums

Additional musicians

- Marc Byrd – ambient guitar (11)
- Derri Daughtery – percussion (5, 7, 10, 11)
- Conor Farley – handclaps (8)
- Steve Wilson – handclaps (8)

=== Production ===
- Conor Farley – A&R
- Matt Bronleewe – producer (1–4, 6, 8, 11)
- Marc Byrd – producer (5, 7, 9–11)
- Steve Hindalong – producer (5, 7, 9–11)
- Rusty Varenkamp – engineer (1–4, 6, 8, 11)
- Derri Daughtery – engineer (5, 7, 9–11)
- J.R. McNeely – mixing (1, 4)
- Shane D. Wilson – mixing (2, 3, 5–11)
- Adam Deane – mix assistant (1, 4)
- Peter Carlson – mix assistant (2, 3, 5–11)
- Dave Steunebrink – mix coordinator (2, 3, 5–11)
- Andrew Mendelson – mastering at Georgetown Masters (Nashville, Tennessee)
- Heather Hetzler – A&R production
- Lani Crump – production coordinator
- Alice Smith – production coordinator
- Stephanie McBrayer – art direction, styling
- Tim Parker – art direction, design
- Jeremy Cowart – photography
- Robin Geary – hair, make-up
- Megan Thompson – hair, make-up

== Singles ==
- "Sound of Melodies"
- "Yes You Have"
- "Tears of the Saints"
- "Reaching"

== Award nominations ==
- Grammy nomination for "Best Pop/Contemporary Gospel Album" in 2007.
- Dove Award nomination for "Rock/Contemporary Recorded Song of the Year" Sound of Melodies, "Worship Song of the Year" Yes You Have, "Rock/Contemporary Album of the Year", and "Praise & Worship Album of the Year".
