= Sevens (Brandon Lake song) =

Single by Brandon Lake

from the album King of Hearts
- Released: May 15, 2025
- Genre: Contemporary Christian; Christian rock; hard rock
- Length: 4:21
- Label: Provident Label Group; Sony Entertainment
- Songwriters: Brandon Lake; Steven Furtick; Hank Bentley; Jacob Sooter; Micah Nichols
- Producer: Micah Nichols

Brandon Lake singles chronology
"Daddy's DNA" (2025)	"Sevens" (2025)

Music videos
- "Sevens" on YouTube
- "Sevens" (lyrics) on YouTube

"Sevens" is a song by American musician Brandon Lake. Released on May 15, 2025, through Provident Label Group and Sony Entertainment, the song appeared as the fourth official single from Lake's 2025 studio album, King of Hearts. It was written by Lake, Steven Furtick, Hank Bentley, Jacob Sooter, and Micah Nichols.

== Background ==
On April 2, 2025, Lake performed the song at a "record-reveal" performance at the Riviera Theatre in Charleston, South Carolina.

After seeing the song's reception, on May 12, 2025, he announced through social media that he would release the song if the concurrent album, King of Hearts, garnered 20,000 presaves within 24 hours. On May 15, the song was released as an official single. Alongside the song, an official music video and lyric video were released.

== Writing and production ==
=== Production ===
Lake co-wrote the song alongside Steven Furtick, Hank Bentley, Jacob Sooter, and Micah Nichols.

David Whitworth acted as programmer and recording engineer, alongside Nichols, who also produced and edited. Holly Zabka worked as executive producer, while Matt Huber was the mixing engineer and Sam Moses the mastering engineer.

=== Composition ===
"Sevens" is composed in the key of C Minor, with a speed of 181.5 beats per minute and a key signature of 4/4. The song is 4:22 minutes in length.

Logan Sekulow of CCM Magazine compared the song to early 2000s rock, saying that song's sound is similar to that of Stryper, Barren Cross, Black Sabbath, and Metallica. He observed that the lyrics were "apocalyptic" and "end-times" themed, with topics surrounding the Bible's Book of Revelation. At the "record-reveal" performance, Lake said that the song was inspired by his noticing of the repetition of the number seven through the Bible, which is mirrored in the song, with references to "seven seals", "seven scrolls" and "seven stars".

== Reception ==
=== Commercial ===
During its first charting week, "Sevens" debuted at its peak position, No. 15 on the Billboard Hot Christian Songs, No. 7 on the Christian Digital Song Sales, and No. 12 on the Rock Digital Song Sales.

=== Accolades ===
Year	Organization	Category	Result	Ref.
2025	We Love Awards	Music Video of the Year	Nominated	
2026	Dove Awards	Rock/Contemporary Recorded Song of the Year	Pending	
2026	Dove Awards	Short Form Music Video of the Year (Concept)	Pending	

== Track listing ==
No.	Title	Length
1.	"Sevens"	4:22
2.	"Sevens" (live from the Record Reveal)	4:31
Total length:		8:53

== Personnel ==
Adapted from Tidal.

- Ariana Snowden – background vocals
- Brandon Lake – main artist, composer, electric guitar
- David Curran – bass
- David Whitworth – drums, keyboards, percussion, programmer, recording engineer, synthesizer
- Destiny Barber – background vocals
- Hank Bentley – composer, keyboards, resonator guitar
- Holly Zabka – executive producer
- Jacob Sooter – composer, keyboards
- Matt Huber – mixing engineer
- Micah Nichols – producer, composer, background vocals, editor, electric guitar, programmer, recording engineer, synthesizer
- Sam Moses – mastering engineer
- Steven Furtick – composer

== Charts ==
=== Weekly ===
Weekly chart performance for "Sevens"
Chart (2025)	Peak position
US Christian Songs (Billboard)	15
US Christian Rock (CR.net)	1
US Rock Digital Song Sales (Billboard)	12

=== Year-end ===
Year-end chart performance for "Sevens"
Chart (2025)	Peak position
US Christian Rock (CR.net)	3

== Release history ==
Release history for "Sevens"
Region	Version	Release	Date	Format	Label	Ref.
Various	Original; live	"Sevens"	May 5, 2025	Digital download; streaming	Provident Label Group; Sony Entertainment	
Various	Original	King of Hearts	June 13, 2025	Digital download; streaming; CD; LP	Provident Label Group; Sony Entertainment	
