= Dusty Bibles =

- Mt. Zion remix

Single by Josiah Queen

from the album Mt. Zion
- Released: June 20, 2025
- Length: 3:10
- Label: Capitol Christian Music Group; F&L Music Group; Josiah Queen Music
- Songwriters: Dylan Thomas; John Michael Howell; Josiah Queen; Zac Lawson
- Producer: John Michael Howell

Josiah Queen singles chronology
"Two Wooden Beams" (2025)	"Dusty Bibles" (2025)	"Cloud and Fire" (2025)

Music videos
- "Dusty Bibles" on YouTube
- "Dusty Bibles" (Lyrics) on YouTube

"Dusty Bibles" is a song recorded by American folk rock musician Josiah Queen, released on June 20, 2025, through Capitol Christian Music Group, F&L Music Group, and Josiah Queen Music. The song appeared as the sixth single from Queen's second studio album, Mt. Zion.

== Release and promotion ==
"Dusty Bibles" was first officially released on June 20, 2025 as a promotional single. Alongside the track's release, Queen announced his second studio album, Mt. Zion. On June 19, and official lyric video was released. On July 15, he released a music video, directed by Brady Pettee, who also directed the video for "Two Wooden Beams". The video features Queen's performance of the song.

The single's track listing features three previously released singles, including "Two Wooden Beams", released on May 16, 2025, "Yesterday Is Dead", released on March 14, 2025, and "Can't Steal My Joy", featuring Brandon Lake, on January 10, 2025.

On July 18, 2025, a "Mt. Zion remix" of the song was released as a non-album single.

== Writing and meaning ==
Queen explained the song's inspiration through Instagram, saying, "Wrote this one after doomscrolling for an hour", musing that "This might be the most honest song I've ever dropped".

Insidegist Blog reviewed that, "This song is notable for its directness and introspective examination of spiritual practice, specifically addressing the common experience of neglecting one's devotional time." The magazine Christian Select explained the lyrical content behind the song, saying, "The song's meaning critically addresses the disconnect between modern life, heavily influenced by technology, and spiritual engagement. It contrasts the constant use of "brand new iPhones" with "dust on our Bibles," serving as a metaphor for spiritual neglect in a digitally saturated world."

"Dusty Bibles" is composed in the Key of D, with a speed of 103 beats per minute and a time signature of 4/4.

== Reception ==
=== Commercial ===
With 2 million digital streams and 2,000 copies sold in its first week, "Dusty Bibles" debuted at No. 7 on the Billboard Hot Christian Songs chart, No. 5 on the Christian Digital Song Sales, No. 10 on the Christian Streaming Songs. On the Hot Rock & Alternative Songs, the song debuted at No. 33, and on the Rock Digital Song Sales it reached No. 13. The song marks Queen's first top 10 debut on the Hot Christian Songs chart.

The song later reached peaks of No. 3 on the Hot Christian Songs, No. 4 on the Christian Digital Song Sales, and No. 3 on the Christian Streaming Songs. It also reached No. 11 on the Hot Rock & Alternative Songs and No. 15 on the Hot Rock Songs.

=== Accolades ===
Year	Organization	Category	Result	Ref.
2025	We Love Awards	Song of the Year	Nominated	
2025	We Love Awards	Contemporary Song of the Year	Nominated	
2026	Dove Awards	Song of the Year	Won	
2026	Dove Awards	Pop/Contemporary Recorded Song of the Year	Won	

== Track listing ==
"Dusty Bibles" single
No.	Title	Writer(s)	Producer(s)	Length
1.	"Dusty Bibles"	Dylan Thomas; John Michael Howell; Josiah Queen; Zac Lawson	John Michael Howell	3:10
2.	"Two Wooden Beams"	John Michael Howell; Josiah Queen; Zac Lawson	John Michael Howell	3:22
3.	"Yesterday Is Dead"	John Michael Howell; Josiah Queen; Zac Lawson	John Michael Howell; Josiah Queen; Zac Lawson	2:46
4.	"Can't Steal My Joy" (featuring Brandon Lake)	Brandon Lake; Hank Bentley; Jacob Sooter; Josiah Queen	Hank Bentley; Jacob Sooter	3:34
Total length:				12:52

== Personnel ==
Credits adapted from Tidal Music.

- Aaron Dombey – artists and repertoire
- Doug Weier – mixing engineer
- Dylan Thomas – writer
- Garrett Daves – artists and repertoire
- John Michael Howell – producer, writer
- Josiah Queen – writer, lead vocalist
- Madi Welker – artists and repertoire
- Mike Cervantes – mastering engineer
- Zac Lawson – writer

== Charts ==
=== Weekly charts ===
Weekly chart performance for "Dusty Bibles"
Chart (2025–2026)	Peak position
Australian Christian Airplay (TCM)	1
New Zealand Most Added (Radioscope)	20
US Billboard Hot 100	92
US Christian Airplay (Billboard)	9
US Hot Christian Songs (Billboard)	3
US Hot Rock & Alternative Songs (Billboard)	11

=== Year-end charts ===
Year-end chart performance for "Dusty Bibles"
Chart (2025)	Position
Australian Christian Airplay (TCM)	6
US Hot Christian Songs (Billboard)	9
US Hot Rock & Alternative Songs (Billboard)	36

== Certifications ==
Certifications for "Dusty Bibles"
Region	Certification	Certified units/sales
Brazil (Pro-Música Brasil)	Gold	20,000^{‡}
United States (RIAA)	Platinum	1,000,000^{‡}
^{‡} Sales+streaming figures based on certification alone.
