= Sons of Sunday =

American Christian worship music supergroup

- Also known as: SOS
- Born: Matthews, North Carolina, U.S. (https://thechapelatmorningstar.com)
- Genres: Worship; Contemporary Christian
- Years active: 2024–present
- Labels: Elevation Worship Records; Provident Label Group
- Publisher: Essential Music Publishing
- Members: Steven Furtick; Brandon Lake; Chandler Moore; Chris Brown; Leeland; Pat Barrett
- Website: sonsofsunday.com

Sons of Sunday is a Christian worship music supergroup, consisting of musicians Steven Furtick, Brandon Lake, Chandler Moore, Chris Brown, Leeland Mooring, and Pat Barrett. They are signed to Elevation Worship Records and Provident Label Group.

== Background ==
Sons of Sunday was formed in early September 2024. On January 17, 2025, the group released their debut two-track single, "God Did! / Runnin With Angels", on Elevation Worship Records and Provident Label Group. "God Did!" was No. 31 on the Billboard Hot Christian Songs peaking later at No. 13. While "Runnin With Angels" did not enter the Hot Christian Songs chart, it peaked at No. 11 on the Christian Digital Song Sales chart.

On February 28, 2025, the EP I Looked Up / One More Day came out. The song "I Looked Up" reached No. 48 on the Hot Christian Songs chart, and "One More Day" reached No. 39 on the same chart. On May 16, 2025, Sons of Sunday released their self-titled debut album, Sons of Sunday. The album hit No. 44 on the Billboard Top Current Album Sales and No. 3 on the Top Christian Albums. On the UK Top Album Downloads (OCC), the album went to No. 44, and on the UK Christian & Gospel Albums, it was No. 10.

== Members ==
- Steven Furtick – vocals (2024–present)
- Brandon Lake – vocals, guitar (2024–present)
- Chandler Moore – vocals, piano (2024–present)
- Chris Brown – vocals (2024–present)
- Leeland Mooring – vocals, guitar, piano (2024–present)
- Pat Barrett – vocals (2024–present)

== Discography ==
=== Albums ===
Title	Details	Peak chart positions			
Title	Details	US	US Christ	UK Down	UK C&G
Sons of Sunday	Released: May 16, 2025; Label: Elevation Worship Records, Provident Label Group; Formats: LP, digital download, streaming	— (Note: Sons of Sunday did not enter the Billboard 200, but peaked at No. 44 on the Billboard Top Current Album Sales)	3	44	10

=== Extended plays ===
Title	Details	Peak chart positions
Title	Details	US Christ
I Looked Up / One More Day	Released: February 28, 2025; Label: Elevation Worship Records, Provident Label Group; Formats: Digital download, streaming	32

=== Singles ===
Title	Year	Peak chart positions						Album
Title	Year	US Christ	US Christ Air	US Christ AC	US Christ Digital	US Christ Stream	UK Christ	Album
"God Did!"	2025	13	20	23	4	24	2	Sons of Sunday
"Runnin With Angels"	2025	—	—	—	11	—	10	Sons of Sunday
"I Looked Up"	2025	48	—	—	—	—	—	Sons of Sunday
"One More Day"	2025	39	37	—	10	—	—	Sons of Sunday
"Exchange"	2025	41	—	—	—	—	—	Sons of Sunday
"Pray Mama (Pray On)"	2025	—	—	—	—	—	7	Sons of Sunday
"—" denotes a recording that did not chart or was not released in that territory.

=== Other songs to chart ===
Title	Year	Peak chart positions	Album
Title	Year	US Christ	Album
"Holyghost"	2025	31	Sons of Sunday
"—" denotes a recording that did not chart or was not released in that territory.

=== Music videos ===
Title	Year	Album	Type	Source
"God Did!"	2025	Sons of Sunday	Performance	Youtube
"Runnin With Angels	2025	Sons of Sunday	Performance	Youtube
"I Looked Up"	2025	Sons of Sunday	Performance	Youtube
"One More Day"	2025	Sons of Sunday	Performance	Youtube
"Exchange"	2025	Sons of Sunday	Performance	Youtube
"Pray Mama (Pray On)"	2025	Sons of Sunday	Narrative	Youtube
"Pray Mama"	2025	Sons of Sunday	Lyrics	Youtube
"W.D.H.D?	2025	Sons of Sunday	Performance	Youtube
"All Back"	2025	Sons of Sunday	Performance	Youtube
"Miracle On Your Mind"	2025	Sons of Sunday	Performance	Youtube
"Higher Than I"	2025	Sons of Sunday	Performance	Youtube
"Holyghost"	2025	Sons of Sunday	Performance	Youtube
"—" denotes a recording that did not chart or was not released in that territory.

== Accolades ==
Year	Organization	Nominee / work	Category	Result	Ref.
2026	Dove Awards	Sons of Sunday	Long Form Music Video of the Year	Pending	
