= King of Hearts (Brandon Lake album) =

Studio album by Brandon Lake
- Released: June 13, 2025
- Studios: Remy Lou's Studio, Charleston, South Carolina; Siloe Studio, Charleston, South Carolina; Home Studio, Nashville, Tennessee; That Dog Will Hunt, Nashville, Tennessee
- Genres: Contemporary Christian, Christian country
- Length: 73:06
- Labels: Provident; Sony
- Producers: Micah Nichols; Chris Brown; Steven Furtick; Hank Bentley; Jacob Scooter

Brandon Lake chronology
Coat of Many Colors (2023)	King of Hearts (2025)

Singles from King of Hearts
- 1. "That's Who I Praise" Released: July 29, 2024; 2. "Hard Fought Hallelujah" Released: November 8, 2024; 3. "I Know a Name" Released: February 14, 2025; 4. "Sevens" Released: May 15, 2025

Professional ratings
Review scores
Source	Rating
Jesus Freak Hideout	3.5/5 stars

King of Hearts is the fifth studio album by Brandon Lake. The album was released on June 13, 2025, through Provident Label Group and Sony Music Entertainment. It features two No. 1 singles, "That's Who I Praise" and "Hard Fought Hallelujah". The album features guest appearances from Jelly Roll, CeCe Winans, Hank Bentley and Hulvey. The album debuted on the Billboard 200 chart at number seven with 37,000 units sold, making it Lake's first top ten entry on the chart.

== Background ==
King of Hearts was first announced on April 2, 2025. Brandon Lake announced the album through a "record reveal" live performance at the Riviera Theater in Charleston, South Carolina. The performance was live-streamed later that day. Lake stated about the inspiration behind the album, "It's not for the seemingly put together, but for those honest about their brokenness, longing to connect with their Creator. He is King of the universe, nations, creation-but most of all, King of hearts."

== Release and promotion ==
Four singles were released off of the album, predating the album's release. The lead single of King of Hearts was "That's Who I Praise", which was released on July 29, 2024. The song was written by Brandon Lake, Steven Furtick, Benjamin William Hastings, Micah Nichols, Zac Lawson, and the lattermost's brother Jake Lawson, better known as Jvke. It was produced by Micah Nichols. The song charted notably, peaking at No. 1 on the Billboard Hot Christian Songs, and remaining at the top of that chart for nine weeks. The song spent 10 weeks at No. 1 on the Christian Airplay chart, tying it with "I Thank God" by JWLKRS and Housefires and "No Fear" by Jon Reddick as the longest time spent at No. 1 on that chart of the 2020s. It additionally peaked at No. 12 on the Bubbling Under Hot 100 and No. 39 on the Recorded Music NZ Hot Singles chart.

The second single released off of King of Hearts was "Hard Fought Hallelujah", which was released on November 8, 2024. The song was written by Brandon lake, Steven Furtick, Benjamin William Hastings, Chis Brown, Rodrick Simmons, and Jason Bradley DeFord, better known as Jelly Roll. It was also produced by Micah Nichols. "Hard Fought Hallelujah" peaked at No. 40 on the Billboard Hot 100, marking his first entry on the chart. It additionally reached No. 1 on the Hot Christian Songs chart and has been at the number 1 position for a total of 29 weeks, No. 18 on the RMNZ Hot Singles chart, and No. 197 on the Billboard Global 200. It has also been certified 2× platinum by the RIAA.

The third single of the album, "I Know a Name", was released on February 14, 2025 with Elevation Worship. It was written by Brandon Lake, Hank Bentley, Steven Furtick, and Jacob Scooter. It was produced by Chris Brown and Steven Furtick. The song peaked at No. 5 on the Billboard Hot Christian Songs chart. Lake released a solo version of the song exclusive to Amazon Music and another version featuring "Cece Winans".

On April 29, 2025, the song "Daddy's DNA" was released as a promotional single. The fourth and final single, "Sevens", was released on May 15, 2025. It was released to celebrate King of Hearts having reached 20,000 presaves within a week.

On May 29, 2025, a Walmart-exclusive two-disk CD was released, featuring the live performance of "Hard Fought Hallelujah" at the Grand Ole Opry.

== Writing and development ==
Lake stated at the "record reveal" performance that the song "Sevens" is in reference to the rainbow, which features seven colors. He stated about the inspiration behind the album, "It's not for the seemingly put together, but for those honest about their brokenness, longing to connect with their Creator. He is King of the universe, nations, creation-but most of all, King of hearts."

== Critical reception ==
Josh Balogh of Jesus Freak Hideout awarded the album 3.5-out-of-5 stars, praising that it is Lake's "most musically ambitious project yet, weaving heartland rock, country twang, R&B grooves, and pop anthems into a vibrant tapestry of worship." He criticized the album, saying, "King of Hearts isn't perfect; its ambition sometimes outpaces its execution." He labelled it as a top-ten album of 2025.

== Accolades ==
At the 2026 Grammy Awards, King of Hearts was nominated for the award of Best Contemporary Christian Music Album.

Year	Organization	Category	Result	Ref.
2026	Grammy Awards	Best Contemporary Christian Music Album	Nominated	
2026	Dove Awards	Pop/Contemporary Album of the Year	Won	

Year-end lists
Publication	Accolade	Rank	Ref.
Jesus Freak Hideout	Grace Graber's Album Picks of 2025	4	
New Release Today	Top 10 Worship Albums of 2025	Unordered	

== Commercial performance ==
King of Hearts debuted at number seven on the US Billboard 200, including atop the Top Christian Albums and Top Rock & Alternative Albums selling 37,000 album-equivalent units.

In the UK, the album achieved a peak of number thirty on the OCC Top Album Downloads and atop the Top Christian & Gospel Albums. It was the highest Christian album debut of 2025.

== Tour ==
Lake announced the King of Hearts tour on April 6, 2025 in anticipation for the upcoming album. 48 Shows were announced starting on October 2, 2025 until May 2, 2026 with Franni Cash and Pat Barrett as the opening acts.

== Track listing ==
Disk one
No.	Title	Writer(s)	Producer(s)	Length
1.	"Plans"	Brandon Lake; Hank Bentley; Jacob Sooter; Jordan Colle	Jacob Sooter; Hank Bentley	3:46
2.	"King of Hearts"	Brandon Lake; Hank Bentley; Jacob Sooter	Jacob Sooter; Hank Bentley	4:28
3.	"Hard Fought Hallelujah" (with Jelly Roll)	Brandon Lake; Steven Furtick; Benjamin William Hastings; Chris Brown; Jason Bradley DeFord; Rodrick Simmons	Micah Nichols	5:16
4.	"Daddy's DNA"	Brandon Lake; Hank Bentley; Jacob Sooter	Hank Bentley; Jacob Scooter	4:30
5.	"I Know a Name" (with CeCe Winans)	Brandon Lake; Hank Bentley; Steven Furtick; Jacob Sooter	Chris Brown; Steven Furtick	5:39
6.	"As for Me & My Home"	Benjamin William Hastins; Brandon Lake; Hank Bentley; Jacob Sooter	Hank Bentley; Jacob Sooter	4:14
7.	"The Great I Am Can"			5:22
8.	"Remember the Miracles" (with Hank Bentley)	Brandon Breitenbach; Brandon Lake; Hank Bentley; Jacob Sooter; Jordan Colle	Hank Bentley; Jacob Sooter	5:32

Disk two
No.	Title	Writer(s)	Producer(s)	Length
9.	"Right in the Middle" (with Hulvey)	Benjamin William Hastings; Brandon Lake; Christopher Hulvey; Micah Nichols; Zac Lawson	Micah Nichols	3:28
10.	"But God"	Benjamin William Hastings; Brandon Lake; Micah Nichols; Zac Lawson	Micah Nichols	3:14
11.	"Watch This!"	Brandon Lake; Hank Bentley; Jacob Sooter; Steven Furtick	Hank Bentley; Jacob Sooter	4:36
12.	"Spare Change"	Brandon Lake; Hank Bentley; Jacob Sooter; Micah Nichols	Hank Bentley; Jacob Sooter	4:56
13.	"Ghost Stories"	Brandon Lake; Hank Bentley; Jacob Sooter; Jordan Colle	Jacob Sooter; Hank Bentley	4:48
14.	"Sevens"	Brandon Lake; Hank Bentley; Jacob Sooter; Micah Nichols; Steven Furtick	Micah Nichols	4:21
15.	"That's Who I Praise"	Brandon Lake; Steven Furtick; Benjamin William Hastings; Micah Nichols; Zac Lawson; Jake Lawson	Nichols	3:48
16.	"The Half Has Not Been Told"	Brandon Lake; Jason Ingram; Steven Furtick	Hank Bentley; Jacob Sooter	5:34
Total length:				73:06

Deluxe edition
No.	Title	Writer(s)	Producer(s)	Length
17.	"1,000,000 Reasons Why"	Brandon Lake; Benjamin William Hastings; Hank Bentley; Jacob Sooter; Micah Nichols	Micah Nichols; Jacob Sooter; Hank Bentley	3:22
18.	"Golgotha"	Brandon Lake; Benjamin William Hastings; Micah Nichols; Zac Lawson	Micah Nichols	5:49
19.	"As For Me & My Home" (with Gabby Barrett)	Benjamin William Hastings; Brandon Lake; Hank Bentley; Jacob Sooter	Hank Bentley; Jacob Sooter	4:06
20.	"Daddy's DNA" (with Breanna Nix)	Brandon Lake; Elizabeth Hashley; Hank Bentley; Jacob Sooter; Leon Gregory; Solo Ray; Zak Dillon	Hank Bentley; Jacob Sooter	3:03
21.	"Sevens" (live from the Record Reveal)	Brandon Lake; Jacob Sooter; Micah Nichols; Steven Furtick	Micah Nichols	4:30
22.	"But God" (live from the Record Reveal)	Benjamin William Hastings; Brandon Lake; Micah Nichols; Zac Lawson	Micah Nichols	3:19
23.	"Daddy's DNA" (live from the Record Reveal)	Brandon Lake; Elizabeth Hashley; Hank Bentley; Jacob Sooter; Leon Gregory; Solo Ray; Zak Dillon	Micah Nichols	4:26
24.	"Hard Fought Hallelujah"	Brandon Lake; Steven Furtick; Benjamin William Hastings; Chris Brown; Rodrick Simmons	Micah Nichols	5:16
Total length:				1:47:00

Walmart exclusive
No.	Title	Writer(s)	Producer(s)	Length
17.	"Hard Fought Hallelujah" (with Jelly Roll, live at the Grand Ole Opry)	Brandon Lake; Steven Furtick; Benjamin William Hastings; Chris Brown; Jason Bradley DeFord; Rodrick Simmons	Mark Thomas

== Charts ==
=== Weekly ===
Weekly chart performance for King of Hearts
Chart (2025)	Peak position
UK Album Downloads (Official Charts)	30
UK Christian & Gospel Albums (OCC)	1
US Billboard 200	7
US Top Christian Albums (Billboard)	1
US Top Rock & Alternative Albums (Billboard)	1

=== Year-end ===
Year-end chart performance for King of Hearts
Chart (2025)	Position
US Top Christian Albums (Billboard)	4
US Top Rock & Alternative Albums (Billboard)	50
