= Gospel Music Network =

American Christian cable television station

- Country: USA
- Headquarters: Albuquerque, New Mexico

Programming
- Language: English

History
- Launched: November 1, 1986
- Closed: early 1990s

The Gospel Music Network was a US commercial Christian cable television station launched in 1986 by Bill and Linda Airy. At the time, the Airys owned a full-service advertising agency in Albuquerque, New Mexico. One of the agency's clients was Pepsi-Cola Bottling Group. In 1986, Pepsi-Cola was interested in reaching an African-American audience for its Mountain Dew product. Research indicated that gospel music was a possible area for Mountain Dew sponsorship. With no gospel music programming available nationwide on any existing network, the Airys launched Gospel Music Network (GMN). A guiding tenet was that GMN would never ask for donations on-air but would rely on advertising sponsorships and license fees from distributors.

Initially funded directly by the Airys, GMN's format was similar to that of MTV, mostly broadcasting music videos. The network did not limit itself to particular styles of music, playing everything from southern and black gospel to the full spectrum of Contemporary Christian music. According to CCM Magazine it was the first network of its type. Later networks with similar programming include Z Music Television and the Gospel Music Channel.

After one year the channel had a viewership potential of two million people. In 1988, GMN was in negotiations for carriage with Tele-Communications, Inc. (TCI), a large cable MSO based in Englewood, CO. During those negotiations, TCI broached the issue of broadening GMN's line-up to include programming from a wide variety of faith traditions – Protestant, Catholic, Orthodox, and Jewish. TCI was interested in having one faith-based channel that would eschew on-air fundraising and that would serve the entire faith community as opposed to a channel for each denomination. In 1989, the Airys sold their advertising agency, moved their family to Denver, and Bill Airy began working for TCI as president of VISN Group, Inc., a new TCI subsidiary formed to merge GMN with the television programming efforts of the National Interfaith Cable Coalition (NICC), a coalition of various leaders from the mainline faith community loosely affiliated with the National Council of Churches. TCI agreed to underwrite the development of the new network (initially known as Vision Interfaith Satellite Network or VISN) which combined GMN with the programming available from NICC.

Ultimately VISN became the Faith & Values Channel in the mid 1990s and was eventually acquired by the Hallmark Channel. By the time Z Music Television was founded in 1991 there was no dedicated outlet for Christian music videos.
