= Z Music Television =

Christian music TV channel

- Country: United States
- Headquarters: Lake Helen, Florida (–1994); Nashville, Tennessee (1994+)

Programming
- Language: English

Ownership
- Owner: Gaylord Entertainment Company (1994+)

History
- Launched: March 1, 1993; 33 years ago
- Closed: 2000; 26 years ago

Z Music Television was a Christian-oriented cable television channel with a music video format similar to that of Viacom's MTV, and, in its earliest days, direct marketing appeals similar to The Home Shopping Network. Their programming, largely music videos with some documentaries, interstitial "Z Buzz" news updates, and media related shows, was characterized as being aimed at "12-to 54-year olds." Unlike style oriented channels such as Country Music Television, they were not limited to a particular musical genre; they played the full spectrum of Contemporary Christian music from reggae to country music. Z Music Television closed in 2000.

== Background ==
Founded in 1991 by David McQuade, Z's offices were based in Lake Helen, Florida. Z Music Television first aired in March 1993, by which time the channel was helmed by former HSN consultant Kenneth Yates, who sought to make the channel more profitable by introducing "sales jockey" segments marketing Christian music CDs and cassettes, bibles, and other lifestyle products, directly to viewers. The network was acquired by Gaylord Entertainment Company in 1994, which moved network operations to the Opryland complex in Nashville, TN. Estimates of audience potential vary widely, but in 1996 the channel was available to between 20 and 35 million homes. The network was not part of the 1996 sale of sister GEC networks TNN and CMT to CBS's cable division. On June 30, 2000, Gaylord ceased the operations of Z Music and gave cable operators the option of replacing it with Video Rola music channel, which was then distributed by Gaylord. Also, Gaylord shifted their efforts toward the internet for Christian music with Musicforce.com and Lightsource.com.

== Programming ==
"We leave out the violence, raw sex appeal, and disrespect for authority."

— Graham Barnard, programming manager, on Z Music's video content.

Z Music sought to place itself in a market segment that would be visible, even inviting, to non Christians while maintaining a direct appeal to Christians. For instance in advertising the network would downplay the word "Christianity;" sometimes the word would not appear. Instead the channel would focus on the positive, uplifting, and "objection-free nature of Z Music programming." The channel extensively partnered with record labels, its first partnership was a 1995 campaign with Benson Records. Even while investing in videos, some record labels indicated that their airing had no measurable impact on an artist's performance. In response, starting about 1996, the company began tweaking the channel's format, introducing shows dealing with lifestyle, and including videos which could be classified as "positive mainstream." Potentially, according to Suzanne Holtermann (manager of marketing), this could mean playing music videos by groups such as Boyz II Men and other mainstream acts alongside Christian market bands such as dc Talk, though such broad mainstream diversity was never actually realized.

Classification of videos on Z Music by content

In the late 1990s two studies of Z Music's programming classified its music videos into three categories based upon their audible and visible religious characteristics. As defined by their author these are:

- Unequivocally Religious — 17% (Green) — "explicitly religious lyrics and visuals"
- Moderately Religious — 52% (Blue) — "While religious lyrics continue to be used, visual images are not explicitly Christian... If viewers were to turn down the sound while watching the clip it is unlikely that they would associate any religious qualities with it."
- Ambiguously Religious — 31% (Red) — "Here spiritual imagery is downplayed even further... blending visuals that are not explicitly Christian with lyrics that are open to interpretation with regard to religion."

The conclusion of the studies was that by showing a high number of videos with ambiguous spiritual content, the programming of Z Music Television was designed to make their Christian nature "apparent only to those willing to listen for it." It also stated that this finding conflicts with a traditional view that Christian performers should be ministers first, then entertainers.

== See also ==
- The Worship Network
- Gospel Music Channel
- Gospel Music Network
- BET Gospel
- WPOZ: non-affiliated radio broadcaster also using "Z"-branded Gospel
