= That's Who I Praise =

2024 song by Brandon Lake

Single by Brandon Lake

from the album King of Hearts
- Released: July 29, 2024
- Genre: Contemporary worship music
- Length: 3:48; 4:15 (live version)
- Label: Provident Label Group
- Songwriters: Brandon Lake; Benjamin William Hastings; Micah Nichols; Zac Lawson; Steven Furtick
- Producer: Micah Nichols

Brandon Lake singles chronology
| "Hands Up to Heaven" (2024) | "That's Who I Praise" (2024) | "Hard Fought Hallelujah" (2024) |

Music videos
- "That's Who I Praise" on YouTube
- "That's Who I Praise" (Live) on YouTube
- "That's Who I Praise" (Lyrics) on YouTube

"That's Who I Praise" is a song by contemporary Christian music artist Brandon Lake. It was released as a single on July 29, 2024. Lake co-wrote the song with Benjamin Hastings, Micah Nichols, Steven Furtick, and Zac Lawson. Micah Nichols handled the production of the single.

The song peaked at number one on the US Hot Christian Songs chart published by Billboard. The song also went on to peak at number 12 on the Bubbling Under Hot 100 chart.

== Background ==
On July 29, 2024, Brandon Lake released "That's Who I Praise" as a single, announcing that the accompanying music video was slated for release on July 31. Lake had previewed the song via TikTok in April 2024, drawing a positive reaction from fans which prompted him to expedite the single's release. Following the release of the single, it reached number one on iTunes Stores across all genres. "That's Who I Praise" was released to Christian radio in the United States on August 19, 2024. On August 26, 2024, Lake released the live version of the song accompanied with the live performance video.

== Composition ==
"That's Who I Praise" is composed in the key of E♭ with a tempo of 112 beats per minute and a musical time signature of 4/4.

== Critical reception ==
Joshua Andre, reviewing for 365 Days of Inspiring Media review, gave a positive remarks about the song, describing it as "a real rocking uplifter and a melody that speaks about praising God even in the most difficult of circumstances." Lindsay Williams of Air1 wrote a favourable review of the song, saying, "The explosive pop anthem namechecks a laundry list of heroes of the faith, engraving their stories of bravery into the song's lyrics."

== Commercial performance ==
"That's Who I Praise" debuted at number three on the US Hot Christian Songs chart dated August 10, 2024, concurrently charting at number one on the Christian Digital Song Sales chart. The following week, the song went to number two on the US Hot Christian Songs chart dated August 17, 2024. "That's Who I Praise" debuted at number 27 on the US Christian Airplay chart dated August 31, 2024.

The song reached number one on the Hot Christian Songs chart dated October 19, 2024, with significant gains in airplay and streaming. "That's Who I Praise" had broken the number one Hot Christian Songs streak by "Praise" by Elevation Worship which features Lake, Chris Brown, and Chandler Moore, which had been at the top of the chart for 31 weeks.

== Music videos ==
Brandon Lake uploaded the audio video of the song on his YouTube channel on July 29, 2024. Lake released the official music video for "That's Who I Praise" via YouTube on July 31, 2024. The music videos features compilations of fan videos singing along to the song in their homes, cars and churches.

On August 26, 2024, Brandon Lake published the live performance video of "That's Who I Praise" on YouTube. Lake premiered the official lyric video for the song via YouTube on August 30, 2024.

== Track listing ==
"That's Who I Praise"
| No. | Title | Length |
|---|---|---|
| 1. | "That's Who I Praise" | 3:48 |

"That's Who I Praise" (Live)
| No. | Title | Length |
|---|---|---|
| 1. | "That's Who I Praise" (live) | 4:25 |
| 2. | "Intro + That's Who I Praise" (live) | 5:15 |
| Total length: | | 9:30 |

"That's Who I Praise" (Live) — Spotify release
| No. | Title | Length |
|---|---|---|
| 1. | "That's Who I Praise" (live) | 4:25 |
| 2. | "That's Who I Praise" | 3:48 |
| 3. | "Intro + That's Who I Praise" (live) | 5:15 |
| Total length: | | 13:18 |

== Personnel ==
Adapted from AllMusic.

- Benjamin Hastings – background vocals
- Brandon Lake – primary artist, acoustic guitar
- Cole Collins – editing
- Dave Curran – bass
- David Whitworth – drums
- Destiny Barber – background vocals
- Matt Huber – mixing engineer
- Micah Nichols – electric guitar, engineer, keyboards, producer, programmer
- Sam Moses – mastering engineer
- Zac Lawson – background vocals, piano

== Charts ==
=== Weekly charts ===
Weekly chart performance for "That's Who I Praise"
| Chart (2024) | Peak position |
|---|---|
| New Zealand Hot Singles (RMNZ) | 39 |
| US Bubbling Under Hot 100 (Billboard) | 12 |
| US Hot Christian Songs (Billboard) | 1 |
| US Christian Airplay (Billboard) | 1 |
| US Christian AC (Billboard) | 1 |

=== Year-end charts ===
Year-end chart performance for "That's Who I Praise"
| Chart (2025) | Position |
|---|---|
| US Hot Christian Songs (Billboard) | 4 |
| US Christian Airplay (Billboard) | 2 |
| US Christian Adult Contemporary (Billboard) | 4 |

== Certifications ==
| Region | Certification | Certified units/sales |
|---|---|---|
| United States (RIAA) | Gold | 500,000^{‡} |
^{‡} Sales+streaming figures based on certification alone.

== Release history ==
Release history for "That's Who I Praise"
| Region | Version | Date | Format | Label | Ref. |
|---|---|---|---|---|---|
| Various | Original | July 29, 2024 | Digital download; streaming | Provident Label Group | |
| United States | Original | August 19, 2024 | Christian contemporary hit radio | Provident Label Group | |
| Various | Live | August 26, 2024 | Digital download; streaming | Provident Label Group | |
