= Stand (Michael W. Smith album) =

Studio album by Michael W. Smith
- Released: November 7, 2006
- Recorded: 2006
- Studios: Dark Horse Recording Studio, Blue 42 and Deer Valley Studios (Franklin, Tennessee); Pentavarit (Nashville, Tennessee); Track Record (North Hollywood, California)
- Genres: Contemporary Christian music; Pop; Worship
- Length: 40:01
- Label: Reunion
- Producer: Matt Bronleewe

Michael W. Smith chronology
| Healing Rain (2004) | Stand (2006) | It's a Wonderful Christmas (2007) |

Professional ratings
Review scores
| Source | Rating |
|---|---|
| AllMusic | 4/5 stars |
| CCM Magazine | A |
| Christian Broadcasting Network | 4/5 stars |
| Christianity Today | 2/5 stars |
| Cross Rhythms | 6/10 stars |
| Jesus Freak Hideout | 4.5/5 stars |
| New Release Tuesday | 4/5 stars |

Stand is Michael W. Smith's twentieth album, follow-up to his 2004 album Healing Rain. The album was released on November 7, 2006.

== Track listing ==
| No. | Title | Writer(s) | Length |
|---|---|---|---|
| 1. | "Cover Me" | MWS, Leeland Mooring, Matt Bronleewe | 3:28 |
| 2. | "Open Arms" | MWS, Mooring, Bronleewe | 3:49 |
| 3. | "Come to the Cross" | MWS, Mooring, Bronleewe | 4:06 |
| 4. | "How to Say Goodbye" | MWS, Amy Grant | 2:19 |
| 5. | "Be Lifted High" | Mooring | 4:11 |
| 6. | "Oh Lord, You're Beautiful" | Keith Green | 2:37 |
| 7. | "Grace" | MWS, Martin Smith | 4:07 |
| 8. | "The Stand" | Joel Houston | 2:54 |
| 9. | "Come See" | MWS, Whitney Smith, Debbie Smith, Ryan Smith, Mooring | 5:23 |
| 10. | "In Silence" | MWS, Mooring | 3:30 |
| 11. | "Escape Your Love" | Mooring, Tyler Smith | 3:29 |

== Personnel ==
=== Musicians ===
- Michael W. Smith – vocals, acoustic piano
- Patrick Warren – additional keyboards, Chamberlin
- Jeremy Bose – accordion
- Rusty Anderson – guitars
- Bruce Gaitsch – guitars
- Paul Moak – guitars, additional instrumentation
- James Gregory – bass
- Lindsay Jamieson – drums
- Luis Conte – percussion
- David Davidson – violin
- Demarco Johnson – harmonica
- Jonathan Rathbone – string arrangements for Gettysburg Music
- Joni McCabe – string conductor and producer
- The Philharmonic Orchestra at The CSNO Studio (Prague, Czech Republic) – strings

Choir

- Bethany Ballinger, Sampson Brueher, Lani Crump, Christina Deloach, Rebecca Kohl, J.T. Landry, Gabrielle Lehr, Michael Olson, Anna Smith, Emily Smith, and Whitney Smith

=== Production ===
- Michael W. Smith – executive producer
- Matt Bronleewe – producer
- Rusty Varenkamp – engineer, editing
- Roberto Bosquez – assistant engineer
- Colin Heldt – assistant engineer
- Brien Sager – assistant engineer
- Josh Bronleewe – additional editing (11)
- Shane D. Wilson – mixing
- Kip Kubin – mix assistant
- Dave Steunebrink – mix coordination and production coordination for Showdown Productions
- Alice Smith – mix coordination for Showdown Productions
- Lani Crump – production coordination for Showdown Productions
- George Marino – mastering at Sterling Sound (New York City, New York)
- Michelle Pearson – A&R production
- Stephanie McBrayer – art direction
- Tim Parker – art direction
- Robert Ascroft – photography
- Natalia Bruschi – hair, make-up
- Eric Niemand – stylist
- Blanton Harrell Cooke & Corzine – exclusive management

== Chart performance ==
| Chart (2014) | Peak position |
|---|---|
| US Billboard 200 | 48 |
| US Top Christian Albums (Billboard) | 1 |
