= Can't Steal My Joy =

Single by Josiah Queen and Brandon Lake

from the album Mt. Zion
- Released: January 10, 2025
- Length: 3:33
- Label: F&L Label Group; Capitol CMG; Josiah Queen Music
- Songwriters: Hank Bentley; Brandon Lake; Jacob Scooter; Josiah Queen
- Producers: Jacob Scooter; Hank Bentley

Josiah Queen singles chronology
"Lowest of Lows" (2024)	"Can't Steal My Joy" (2025)	"Yesterday Is Dead" (2025)

Brandon Lake singles chronology
"Hard Fought Hallelujah" (2024)	"Can't Steal My Joy" (2025)	"I Know a Name" (2025)

Music video
- "Can't Steal My Joy" on YouTube

Professional ratings
Review scores
Source	Rating
The Jericho Sound	89/100

"Can't Steal My Joy" is a single by American alternative pop/rock singers and musicians Josiah Queen and Brandon Lake. The song was released on January 10, 2025, through F&L Label Group, Capitol CMG, and Josiah Queen Music.

== Background ==
"Can't Steal My Joy" was the first release made by Queen since signing to Capitol CMG. Several teasers of the song were released to social media before its official release, receiving a combined five million views. The song itself accumulated 12.5 million digital streams within the first three months of release.

Lyrically, the song is Christian-based. It was written by Josiah Queen, Lake, Hank Bentley, and Jacob Scooter, with Bentley and Scooter producing. Queen said that the song "came from the idea that our joy isn't dependent on the situations we face in our lives". On January 9, 2025, an official music video was released, featuring song lyrics.

== Reception ==
=== Commercial ===
"Cant Steal My Joy" reached No. 19 on the Billboard Hot Rock Songs chart, and No. 6 on the Rock Digital Song Sales chart. Additionally it reached No. 6 on the Hot Christian Songs chart, No. 10 on the Christian Airplay, and No. 4 on the Christian Digital Song Sales.

=== Accolades ===
Year	Organization	Category	Result	Ref.
2025	We Love Awards	Collaboration of the Year	Nominated	
2026	K-Love Fan Awards	Song of the Year	Nominated	
2026	Dove Awards	Song of the Year	Pending	

Year-end lists
Publication	Accolade	Rank	Ref.
K-Love	25 Songs That Defined 2025	Unordered	
Air1	Air1 Unwrapped 2025	5	

== Charts ==
=== Weekly ===
Weekly chart performance for "Can't Steal My Joy"
Chart (2025)	Peak position
Australia Christian Airplay (TCM)	7
US Christian Airplay (Billboard)	1
US Hot Christian Songs (Billboard)	6
US Hot Rock & Alternative Songs (Billboard)	19

=== Year-end ===
Year-end chart performance for "Can't Steal My Joy"
Chart (2025)	Position
Australian Christian Airplay (TCM)	58
US Christian Airplay (Billboard)	24
US Christian Adult Contemporary (Billboard)	31
US Christian Songs (Billboard)	11
US Hot Rock & Alternative Songs (Billboard)	67

== Certifications ==
Certifications for "Can't Steal My Joy"
Region	Certification	Certified units/sales
United States (RIAA)	Gold	500,000^{‡}
^{‡} Sales+streaming figures based on certification alone.
