= Hard Fought Hallelujah =

Single by Brandon Lake

from the album King of Hearts
- Released: November 8, 2024
- Genre: Contemporary Christian; country
- Length: 5:16
- Label: Provident Music Group
- Songwriters: Brandon Lake; Steven Furtick; Benjamin Hastings; Chris Brown; Rodrick Simmons; Jason DeFord
- Producer: Micah Nichols

Brandon Lake singles chronology
"That's Who I Praise" (2024)	"Hard Fought Hallelujah" (2024)	"Can't Steal My Joy" (2025)

Remix cover
- Jelly Roll remix cover

Jelly Roll singles chronology
"Losers" (2025)	"Hard Fought Hallelujah" (2025)	"Heart of Stone" (2025)

"Hard Fought Hallelujah" is a song by Brandon Lake, an American Christian contemporary singer and musician. The song was released on Provident on November 8, 2024. With 7 million US streams and 13,000 US sales, the song debuted at number 51 on the Billboard Hot 100 and No. 1 on the Digital Songs chart. It was No. 1 on the Hot Christian Songs chart for a total of 34 weeks, making it one of the top Christian music song debuts of 2024. The song was written by Lake, Steven Furtick, Benjamin Hastings, Rodrick Simmons, and Chris Brown. It was produced by Micah Nichols and mixed by Vance Powell.

On December 6, 2024, a "heavyweight edition" was released featuring five additional versions of the song. A remix with singer-songwriter Jelly Roll was released on February 7, 2025. On April 16, 2025, a "gospel remix" of the song was released.

In June 2025, the song was certified platinum by the Record Industry Association of America.

== Background ==
Lake said the song is "about the battles we face, the grit throughout the fight for faith and the praise that comes after". Also this comes from a testimony that he passed through that inspired him to make this song.

== Accolades ==
At the 2025 K-Love Fan Awards, "Hard Fought Hallelujah" was awarded song of the year.

Year	Organization	Category	Result	Ref.
2025	K-Love Fan Awards	Song of the Year	Won	
2025	GMA Dove Awards	Song of the Year	Won	
2025	GMA Dove Awards	Short Form Music Video of the Year	Won	
2025	GMA Dove Awards	Blugrass/Country/Roots Recorded Song of the Year	Won	
2025	CMA Awards	Musical Event of the Year	Nominated	
2025	We Love Awards	Song of the Year	Nominated	
2025	We Love Awards	Contemporary Song of the Year	Nominated	
2025	We Love Awards	Mainstream Impact Award	Won	
2026	Grammy Awards	Best Contemporary Christian Music Performance/Song	Won	

Year-end lists
Publication	Accolade	Rank	Ref.
Jesus Freak Hideout	Alex Caldwell's Song Picks	7	
Air1	Air1 Unwrapped 2025	2	
K-Love	25 Songs That Defined 2025	Unordered	

== Track listing ==
No.	Title	Writer(s)	Producer(s)	Length
1.	"Hard Fought Hallelujah"	Brandon Lake; Steven Furtick; Benjamin Hastings; Jelly Roll; Chris Brown; Rodrick Simmons	Micah Nichols	5:16
Total length:				5:16

All lyrics are written by Brandon Lake, Steven Furtick, Jelly Roll, Benjamin Hastings, Chris Brown, Rodrick Simmons, and produced by Micah Nichols.

Heavyweight edition
No.	Title	Length
1.	"Hard Fought Hallelujah"	5:16
2.	"Hard Fought Halleujah" (live)	5:43
3.	"Hard Fought Hallelujah" (acoustic)	5:10
4.	"Hard Fought Hallelujah" (original demo)	5:11
5.	"Hard Fought Hallelujah" (radio)	4:16
6.	"Hard Fought Hallelujah" (instrumental)	5:16

== Personnel ==
=== Writers ===
- Brandon Lake
- Steven Furtick
- Benjamin William Hastings
- Chris Brown
- Rodrick Simmons
- Jason Bradley DeFord

=== Production ===
- Micah Nichols – producer
- Vance Powell – mixing

=== Cover art ===
- Jacob Boyles – cover art, design
- Sadie Schwanberg – photography

=== Music video ===
- Jacob Boyles – director, producer
- Andrew Livingstone – director
- Rachael Mulcahy – producer
- Sadie Schwanberg – creative direction

== Charts ==
=== Weekly charts ===
Weekly chart performance for "Hard Fought Hallelujah"
Chart (2024–2025)	Peak position
Australia Christian Airplay (TCM)	1
Canada Country (Billboard)	60
Global 200 (Billboard)	197
New Zealand Hot Singles (RMNZ)	18
UK Christian Songs (Cross Rhythms)	1
US Billboard Hot 100	40
US Adult Contemporary (Billboard)	25
US Country Airplay (Billboard)	24
US Christian Airplay (Billboard)	1
US Hot Christian Songs (Billboard)	1
US Hot Country Songs (Billboard)	12
US Hot Rock & Alternative Songs (Billboard)	8

=== Year-end charts ===
Year-end chart performance for "Hard Fought Hallelujah"
Chart (2025)	Position
Australian Christian Airplay (TCM)	4
UK Christian Songs (Cross Rhythms)	3
US Billboard Hot 100	84
US Christian Adult Contemporary (Billboard)	11
US Christian Airplay (Billboard)	11
US Hot Christian Songs (Billboard)	1
US Hot Country Songs (Billboard)	32
US Hot Rock & Alternative Songs (Billboard)	13

== Certifications ==
Certifications for "Hard Fought Hallelujah"
Region	Certification	Certified units/sales
United States (RIAA)	Platinum	1,000,000^{‡}
United States (RIAA) Remix	Platinum	1,000,000^{‡}
^{‡} Sales+streaming figures based on certification alone.
