= Leeland Dayton Mooring =

American singer-songwriter

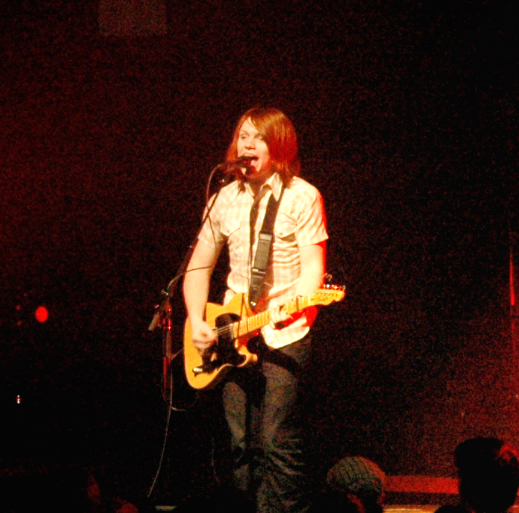
- Leeland Mooring in February 2007

Background information
- Born: June 16, 1988 (age 37); Baytown, Texas, U.S.
- Genres: Contemporary Christian music, Christian rock, alternative rock, progressive rock
- Occupations: Singer, songwriter, guitarist
- Instruments: Vocals, guitar, piano, bass guitar
- Years active: 2000–present
- Member of: Sons of Sunday

Leeland Dayton Mooring (born June 16, 1988) is an American worship musician, singer and songwriter known as the lead vocalist and guitarist of the band Leeland, as well as serving a brief tenure as an ensemble worship leader with Bethel Music.

Leeland became a Christian at the age of five. He is married to Amanda Louise Mooring. He has two siblings; older brother Jack Mooring and younger sister Shelly Roberts. Jack Mooring is married to Michael W. Smith's daughter, Whitney Katherine Smith-Mooring. Leeland co-wrote six songs on Stand, Michael W. Smith's 2007 release, and wrote a seventh entirely.

== Inspiration ==
When asked what inspires his songwriting he said, "A lot of my songs are birthed out of prayer. The ones that we've received the best response from have been the ones God just kind of dropped in my lap while I was spending time in His presence. That's my main inspiration."

On describing a scene reflecting God's glory through nature as said in "Yes You Have" said, "We were driving through Washington. I had my headphones on, listening to some Irish Celtic music. A choir was in the background, and while I was listening, I looked outside the van, and we were driving through beautiful mountains. The culmination of the music and the mountains was just incredible. It shows you how small you are and how much of a human you still are and need God."

When pressed about having hard times in his own life, and if there've ever been times when things were overwhelming, like that of which one of the more serious songs from Sound of Melodies, "Too Much", says, he stated, "I’ve always grown up in a strong Christian family, so I’ve never gone through a lot like a lot of kids have. I’m very blessed with that. But that two-year stint [on the road] was some of the best times and some of the most striving times. I was only 11, 12 and 13 during those years. We constantly had to trust God week to week for finances so we could live. The last week we traveled [as a family], my mom was put in the hospital and almost had a heart attack. She physically couldn’t take it, because we weren’t getting a lot of sleep. It was hard on us. I look at the pictures now, and it was by God’s grace that she got out and that nothing serious happened. I don’t know what I’d do with myself if my mom ever died, because she’s the pillar in our lives. I couldn’t picture myself without her wisdom, guidance and love."

When asked about the story behind "Carried to the Table", said, "One of the evangelists [my family] traveled with for two years had a message that spoke about that story of Mephibosheth in 2 Samuel. His message moved me so much that I fell in love with that story and couldn’t get it out of my head. He related [the story] in the message to how God carries us to the table. Things I can’t get out of my head, I make songs out of them. I sat in my room and prayed to God about it. I worked on [the song] two days and finally finished it."

In 2008, Leeland married his girlfriend, Mandy, who he had been dating for a year and a half.

He has written the song "Decoy" with Paramore's members Hayley Williams and Josh Farro which is on Paramore's live album. He has also co-written the song "Stronger (Back on the Ground)" with Jack Mooring and Nick Jonas for the album "Who I Am" of Nick Jonas and The Administration.

He co-wrote and contributed vocals to "Young" for RaeLynn's 2017 debut album, WildHorse.

On April 23, 2018, he and his wife welcomed their first child, a daughter named Journey Shipp Mooring, via adoption.
