= Breathe on It =

Studio album by Tauren Wells
- Released: May 1, 2026
- Genre: Worship
- Length: 73:39
- Labels: Sparrow; Capitol CMG
- Producers: Aaron Robertson; Chris Strawder; Chuck Butler; Colby Wedgeworth; Demitri Wells; Jonathan Smith; Jordan Sapp; Luis Higuera

Tauren Wells chronology
Let the Church Sing (2025)	Breathe on It (2026)

Singles from Breathe on It
- 1. "Making Room" Released: November 1, 2024; 2. "Thank You for the Cross" Released: January 31, 2025; 3. "The Church Is on Fire" Released: November 14, 2025; 4. "Serve the Lord" Released: November 14, 2025; 5. "Here Comes the Church" Released: December 4, 2025; 6. "Breathe on It" Released: January 22, 2026; 7. "Bless Your Name" Released: March 13, 2026; 8. "Sunday Morning" Released: April 10, 2026

Breathe on It is the fourth studio album by the American contemporary Christian music singer-songwriter and pastor Tauren Wells. The album was released on May 1, 2026, via Sparrow Records and Capitol Christian Music Group, to digital download and streaming formats. It was produced by Aaron Robertson, Chris Strawder, Chuck Butler, Colby Wedgeworth, Demetri Wells, Jonathan Smith, Jordan Sapp, and Luis Higuera. It features writing credits from Robertson, Byron M. Chambers, Butler, Wedgeworth, D.A. Davies, Demitri Wells, Jeremy "Jay-J" James, Jonathan Gamble, Smith, Sapp, Lorna Wells, Steven Furtick, and Tauren Wells. The album contains guest appearances from Eccos, Elevation Worship, Hulvey, Pastor Mike Jr., Phil Wickham, Robert Angel, and Samuel Robles.

Breathe on It was supported with the release of eight preceding singles, including "Making Room", "Thank You for the Cross", "The Church Is on Fire", "Serve the Lord", "Here Comes the Church", "Breathe on It", "Bless Your Name", and "Sunday Morning". "Making Room" peaked at number 45 on the Billboard Hot Christian Songs chart, with "Breathe on It" at number 49, and "Bless Your Name" at number 31. On the Billboard Hot Gospel Songs chart, "Sunday Morning" peaked at number 21. Although the song "Let the Church Sing" was not released as a single, it charted at number 22 on the Hot Christian Songs chart. The album was also preceded by the Let the Church Sing extended play, for which Wells had garnered a Grammy Award nomination for Best Contemporary Christian Music Album.

== Background ==
Breathe on It was inspired by Wells' work with the Church of Whitestone in Austin, Texas, which he pastors. The church had been founded in January 2024, and, being promoted by Wells, had set a record for the largest first-day attendance of any American church, with more than 4,000 attendants. Amidst the album's recording, Wells had also written and released his debut book, Joy Bomb: Unleash Jesus’s Explosive Joy for an Extraordinary Life, in 2025; the book was commercially successful, and quickly became a bestseller according to sales reports from Amazon and ECPA.

== Release and promotion ==
The first track to be released from Breathe on It was "Joy in the Morning", a collaboration with Elevation Worship, on January 1, 2023. The song is a remixed version of a previously released track, which Wells had released in 2022 as a solo performer. Although not released as a single, the song appeared on an extended single featuring several remixes of the original track. It was promoted with the release of a music video, which was uploaded to YouTube. The second track from the album to be released, as well as the lead single, "Making Room", was released on November 1, 2024. It was promoted with the release of a lyric video, which was uploaded to YouTube. With the song's release, it was announced that a forthcoming album by the same name would be releasing in 2025. The album's second single, "Thank You For the Cross", was released on January 31, 2025. The song was promoted with the release of a lyric video, which was uploaded to YouTube.

In February 2025, Wells' plans to release the Let the Church Sing extended play were announced. It was officially released on March 21, 2025. The extended play included the two previously released singles, "Making Room" and "Thank You For the Cross", as well as three additional tracks which later appeared on the full album. The extended play's title track began impacting Christian radio in May 2025, and was promoted with the release of a lyric video. On November 14, 2025, the songs "The Church Is on Fire" and "Serve the Lord" were released together on a dual single. The fifth single from Breathe on It, "Here Comes the Church", was released on December 4, 2025.

On January 22, 2026, the album's title track was released exclusively to Air1-based Christian radio stations in the United States as the fifth single from Breathe on It, before later being released to digital download and streaming formats. The song was promoted with the release of a lyric video. It was succeeded by "Bless Your Name" on March 13, 2026. It was promoted with the release of a lyric video. On April 10, 2026, "Sunday Morning" was released as the album's eighth and final single. The song was promoted with a release of a lyric video, which was uploaded to YouTube upon release. In April 2026, the full album was announced, alongside the full track listing and release date. With its announcement, the album was made available for pre-order.

== Reception ==
Professional ratings
Review scores
Source	Rating
Jesus Freak Hideout	2.5/5 stars
Jubilee Cast	3/5 stars

=== Critical ===
Breathe on It received generally poor reception from critical audiences. Reviewing for Jesus Freak Hideout, Noah Schmidt rated the album 2.5-out-of-5. He wrote that, in comparison to Wells' prior, more "experimental" projects, the record appeared "unusually safe". He was critical of its "mammoth runtime" and "homogeneity", observing that the tracks "tend to blur together"; he wrote that "the songs themselves are not bad", although found it difficult "to consume this giant record at once". In a 3-out-of-5 rating for Jubilee Cast, Rison Zion wrote that the album "suffers from excess", being "weighed down by songs that blur together structurally and sonically". He praised Wells' "smooth delivery and ability to move between worship, gospel, and pop", but concluded that, because of its length, it came across to him as an "uneven worship project".

=== Commercial ===
Breathe on It contained five charted songs. "Making Room", the album's lead single did not chart initially; however, upon the release of the Let the Church Sing extended play debuted upon the Billboard Hot Christian Songs chart at its peak of number 45. That same week, the extended play's title track debuted at number 41 on the chart. "Let the Church Sing", following thirteen weeks on the chart, eventually peaked at number 22 on the Hot Christian Songs chart. It had received support from Christian radio, causing it to peak at numbers 11 and 7 on the Christian Airplay and Christian Adult Contemporary charts, respectively. The album's title track peaked at number 49 on the Hot Christian Songs chart and number 30 on the Christian Airplay chart, while "Bless Your Name" peaked at number 31 on the former. "Sunday Morning" did not enter the Hot Christian Songs chart, but peaked at number 21 on the Hot Gospel Songs chart.

The album itself debuted at number 28 on the Billboard Top Christian Albums chart. With its release, one album track charted on the Hot Christian Songs chart, "How Great", which peaked at number 31.

=== Industry awards ===
==== Album ====
Year	Nominee / work	Category	Result	Ref.
2026	Dove Awards	Worship Album of the Year	Nominated	
2027	Grammy Awards	Best Contemporary Christian Music Performance/Song	Pending	

==== Song-specific ====
Year	Organization	Nominee / work	Category	Result	Ref.
2025	We Love Awards	"Let the Church Sing"	Pop Song of the Year	Won	
2026	Dove Awards	"Sunday Morning"	Contemporary Gospel Recorded Song of the Year	Nominated	

== Track listing ==
No.	Title	Writer(s)	Producer(s)	Length
1.	"Serve the Lord"	Tauren Wells; Aaron Robertson; Demitri Wells; D.A. Davies	Robertson	3:55
2.	"The Church Is on Fire"	T. Wells; Robertson	Robertson	4:15
3.	"Breathe on It"	T. Wells; Colby Wedgeworth; Jonathan Gamble	Wedgeworth	4:00
4.	"How Great" (featuring Phil Wickham and Hulvey)	T. Wells; Jordan Sapp; Paul Duncan	Sapp; Xander^{[c]}	3:26
5.	"Bless Your Name"	T. Wells; Wedgeworth; Gamble	Wedgeworth	4:11
6.	"What a Miracle Feels Like"	T. Wells; Joshua Holiday; Steven Furtick	Sapp; Luke Johns^{[a]}	6:19
7.	"Sunday Morning" (featuring Pastor Mike Jr.)	T. Wells; Jeremy James; Byron M. Chambers	Sapp^{[p]}; James	3:04
8.	"Thank You for the Cross"	T. Wells; Jonathan Smith; Wedgeworth	Smith; Chris Strawder	4:30
9.	"What's Not in Heaven"	T. Wells; Sapp; Duncan	Sapp; Johns^{[a]}	3:49
10.	"Here Comes the Church"	T. Wells	Robertson	5:43
11.	"Cantaremos (Que Cante la Iglesia)" (featuring Eccos and Samuel Robles)	T. Wells; Sapp	Sapp	3:15
12.	"Not Guilty"	T. Wells; Chuck Butler; Lorna Wells	Butler	5:57
13.	"Joy in the Morning" (featuring Elevation Worship)	T. Wells; Furtick; Chris Brown	Luis Higuera; Strawder	8:48
14.	"Making Room"	T. Wells; Sapp	Sapp	4:21
15.	"The Room Is Yours" (featuring Robert Angel)	T. Wells; D. Wells; Daifah Davies	D. Wells	5:10
16.	"Let the Church Sing"	T. Wells; Sapp	Sapp	2:56
Total length:				73:39

=== Notes ===
- ^{^[p]} signifies a producer and vocal producer
- ^{^[c]} signifies a co-producer
- ^{^[a]} signifies an additional producer

== Personnel ==
Credits are adapted from Tidal.

=== Musicians ===
- Tauren Wells – vocals
- Aaron Robertson – piano, programming (tracks 1, 2, 10)
- Benny Martinez – guitar (1, 2, 10)
- Antonio "AJ" Cunningham – choir arrangement (1, 2, 10), choir vocals (1, 10)
- Deene Harris – choir vocals (1, 2, 10)
- Joy Perrymond – choir vocals (1, 2, 10)
- Matthew Jackson – choir vocals (1, 2, 10)
- Talandria Gosha – choir vocals (1, 2, 10)
- Justin Raines – bass (1, 2)
- Demetri Wells – additional programming (1); keyboards, programming (3); piano (15)
- Daifah Davies – background vocals (1, 13, 16)
- Kate Slaughter – background vocals (1, 15)
- August Robertson – background vocals (1)
- Khrystina Harvey – choir vocals (1)
- Otis Williams – drums (1)
- Jacob Arnold – drums (2, 3, 5, 6, 10), percussion (6)
- Sam Simon – additional programming (2, 10)
- Alaina Hummel – choir vocals (2, 10)
- Alissa Moss – choir vocals (2, 10)
- Austin Pyle – choir vocals (2, 10)
- Caden Yocum – choir vocals (2, 10)
- Cary Yocum – choir vocals (2, 10)
- Jesse O'Brien – choir vocals (2, 10)
- Makenna Christopherson – choir vocals (2, 10)
- Melissa Yocum – choir vocals (2, 10)
- Colby Wedgeworth – programming (3, 5), electric guitar (3); background vocals, choir vocals, keyboards (5)
- Cory Pierce – acoustic guitar, electric guitar (3, 5)
- David Curran – bass (3, 5)
- Debi Selby – choir vocals (3, 5)
- Harmonie Hall – choir vocals (3, 5)
- Jannelle Means – choir vocals (3, 5)
- Ron Poindexter – choir vocals (3, 5)
- Wil Merrell – choir vocals (3, 5)
- Jordan Sapp – programming (4, 6, 9, 11, 14, 16), keyboards (4, 6, 9, 11, 16), guitar (4, 11, 14, 16), acoustic guitar (6, 9), electric guitar (6)
- Dom Liberati – bass (4, 9, 14)
- Paul Duncan – keyboards (4)
- Alexander Papamitrou – programming (4)
- Phil Wickham – vocals (4)
- Hulvey – vocals (4)
- Jonathan Gamble – background vocals, piano (5)
- Jeremy "Jay-J" James – bass synthesizer, drum programming, keyboards, piano (7)
- Chris Strawder – electric guitar, keyboards, programming (8); drums (11, 13, 16)
- Luis Higuera – keyboards (8, 12–14), programming (8, 13), piano (12)
- Jacob Lowery – bass (8)
- Lester Estelle – drums (8)
- Taylor Johnson – electric guitar (8)
- Jonathan Smith – piano (8)
- Court Clement – acoustic guitar (9), guitar (14)
- Luke Johns – keyboards, programming (9)
- Shae Wooton – bass (10)
- Bella Zydiak – choir vocals (10)
- Jasmine Schans – choir vocals (10)
- Jason Stocker – choir vocals (10)
- Stella Craven – choir vocals (10)
- Victor Labra – choir vocals (10)
- Ward Chakmakjian – choir vocals (10)
- Uriah Solis – bass (11, 16), electric guitar (13)
- Dwan Hill – Hammond B3 (11, 16)
- Chuck Butler – background vocals, programming (12)
- Emma Pears – background vocals (12)
- Joe L. Barnes – background vocals (12)
- John Montoya – background vocals (12)
- Lauren Scott – background vocals (12)
- Casey Moore – guitar (12)
- Chris Brown – acoustic guitar, vocals (13)
- Robert Rivera – background vocals (13)
- Andrew Koontz – bass (13)
- Joey Signa – electric guitar (13)
- L. J. Mitchell – organ (13)
- Elevation Worship – vocals (13)
- Tiffany Hudson – vocals (13)
- Devonne Fowlkes – background vocals (14)
- Emoni Wilkins – background vocals (14)
- Terry White – background vocals (14)
- Chris Bevins – choir arrangement (14)
- Aaron Sterling – drums (14)
- Toby Friesen – guitar (14)
- Robert Angel – background vocals (15)
- Blaine Slaughter – background vocals (15)
- Kaitlin Davis – background vocals (15)
- Lorna Wells – background vocals (15)
- Natori Blue – background vocals (15)
- Danny Lopez – bass (15)
- Abel Orta Jr. – drums (15)
- E. Edwards – guitar (15)
- Andriana Haygood – choir vocals (16)
- Ashley Pérez – choir vocals (16)
- Christian Walker – choir vocals (16)
- Hannah Everhart – choir vocals (16)
- Jamiah Hudson – choir vocals (16)
- Robert Mauti – choir vocals (16)

=== Technical ===
- Aaron Robertson – engineering, digital editing (1, 2, 10)
- Harry Rivera – engineering (1, 2, 10)
- Todd Lyons – engineering (1, 2, 10)
- Jesse O'Brien – engineering (2, 10)
- Colby Wedgeworth – engineering (3, 5)
- Demetri Wells – engineering (3), vocal engineering (3, 5)
- Jordan Sapp – engineering (4, 6, 7, 9, 12, 14, 16), mixing (6, 7, 9, 11, 12, 15, 16), vocal engineering (16)
- Alexander Papamitrou – engineering (4)
- Luis Higuera – engineering (8, 13), mixing (13)
- Chris Strawder – engineering (8)
- Eric Wilson – engineering (11, 16)
- Chase Weber – vocal engineering (3, 5)
- Samu Robles – vocal engineering (11)
- Steven Richards – vocal engineering (11)
- Jack Nellis – mixing (1–4, 10)
- Doug Weier – mixing (5)
- Sean Moffitt – mixing (8, 14)
- Sam Moses – mastering (1–12, 14–16)
- Drew Lavyne – mastering (13)
- Jonathan Buffum – digital editing (1, 2, 10)
- Baily Hager – digital editing (1)

== Charts ==
Chart performance for Breathe on It
Chart (2026)	Peak position
US Top Christian Albums (Billboard)	28

== Release history ==
Release history and formats for Breathe on It
Region	Date	Format(s)	Label(s)	Ref.
Various	May 1, 2026	Digital download; streaming	Sparrow/Capitol CMG	
