= Take It All Back (song) =

Single by Tauren Wells, We The Kingdom and Davies.

from the EP Take It All Back
- Released: August 18, 2023
- Genre: Christian pop; Christian hip-hop
- Length: 3:13
- Label: Sparrow Records; Capitol CMG; Essential Music
- Songwriters: Colby Wedgeworth; Ethan Hulse; Daifah Davies; Tauren Wells; Tedd Tjornhom
- Producers: Tedd Tjornhom; Colby Wedgeworth

Tauren Wells singles chronology
"Something Better" (2023)	"Take It All Back" (2023)	"Making Room" (2024)

We the Kingdom singles chronology
"Jesus Does" (2023)	"Take It All Back" (2023)	"Christmas in Hawaii" (2023)

Davies. singles chronology
"Perfect" (2022)	"Take It All Back" (2023)	"You Got Me" (2024)

Music video
- "Take It All Back" on YouTube

Professional ratings
Review scores
Source	Rating
The Jericho Sound	89/100
365 Days of Inspiring Media	5/5 stars

"Take It All Back" is a song by American alternative pop musician Tauren Wells, American rock band We the Kingdom, and rap/hip-hop musician Davies. It was first released on June 10, 2022 through the album Joy in the Morning (Horizon Edition), until being released as a single on August 18, 2023, through Sparrow Records, Capitol CMG, and Essential Music.

On May 27, 2025, the song was certified gold by the Recording Industry Association of America for selling at least 500,000 copies within the US.

== Release and promotion ==
"Take It All Back" was released on August 18, 2023, through Sparrow Records, Capitol CMG, and Essential Music. It was written by Colby Wedgeworth, Ethan Hulse, Daifah Davies, Tauren Wells, and Tedd Tjornhom.

Following its release, Wells embarked on the Takeback Tour. The first wing, with Danny Gokey and Ryan Ellis, began in September 2024 and visited 12 cities. The second wing, with Jordan Feliz, Davies., and Ryan Ellis, began in December 2024, reaching eight cities.

On August 20, 2023, Wells performed the song on Fox & Friends. On April 12, 2024, an official music video was released to YouTube. The video has garnered over 10 million views. It has accumulated over 35 million on DSPs.

The song was released alongside an extended play of the same name, which reached No. 34 on the Billboard Top Christian Albums chart.

== Commercial performance ==
"Take It All Back" peaked at No. 3 on the Billboard Hot Christian Songs chart, being Wells' best charting song that chart, tied between "Famous For (I Believe)", "Known", "All My Hope", and "Hills and Valleys". Additionally, the song topped the Christian Airplay, Christian Adult Contemporary, and Christian Digital Song Sales chart. It reached No. 6 on the Billboard Christian Streaming Songs chart, and No. 1 on the Cross Rhythms UK Top 10 chart.

On the year-end chart, the song achieved No. 3 on the Hot Christian Songs, No. 5 on the Christian Airplay, and No. 6 on the Cross Rhythms UK Top 10.

== Legacy ==
To celebrate the one-year anniversary of the single, Wells released a remixed "cinematic" version of "Take It All Back", on August 22, 2024. The song featured producer Tommee Profitt. It was released alongside several additional remixes of the song. Following that, a version of the song was released in collaboration with hard rock/heavy metal group Skillet, on October 4, 2024.

On May 27, 2025, the song was certified gold by the Recording Industry Association of America for selling at least 500,000 copies within the US.

== Track listing ==
Single version
No.	Title	Writer(s)	Producer(s)	Length
1.	"Take It All Back"	Colby Wedgeworth; Ethan Hulse; Daifah Davies; Tauren Wells; Tedd Tjornhom	Tedd Tjornhom; Colby Wedgeworth	3:13
Total length:				3:13

== Charts ==
=== Weekly charts ===
Weekly chart performance for "Take It All Back"
Chart (2023–24)	Peak position
UK Christian Airplay (Cross Rhythms)	1
US Hot Christian Songs (Billboard)	3
US Christian Airplay (Billboard)	1
US Christian AC Airplay (Billboard)	1

=== Year-end charts ===
Year-end chart performance for "Take It All Back"
Chart (2024)	Position
UK Christian Airplay (Cross Rhythms)	6
US Hot Christian Songs (Billboard)	3
US Christian Airplay (Billboard)	5
US Christian AC Airplay (Billboard)	3
Chart (2025)	Position
US Hot Christian Songs (Billboard)	72
US Christian Airplay (Billboard)	24

== Certifications ==
Certifications for "Take It All Back"
Region	Certification	Certified units/sales
United States (RIAA)	Gold	500,000^{‡}
^{‡} Sales+streaming figures based on certification alone.
