= Fake It (Tauren Wells song) =

2022 song by Tauren Wells

Single by Tauren Wells featuring Aaron Cole

from the album Joy in the Morning
- Released: February 25, 2022
- Recorded: 2021
- Genre: Contemporary Christian music, electropop, dance-pop
- Length: 3:06
- Label: Sparrow; Capitol CMG
- Songwriters: Aaron Cole; Chris Stevens; Emily Weisband; Tauren Wells
- Producers: Chris Stevens; Tedd T

Tauren Wells singles chronology
| "Merry Christmas, Happy Holidays" (2021) | "Fake It" (2022) | "Joy in the Morning" (2022) |

Aaron Cole singles chronology
| "Leave Me" (2021) | "Fake It" (2022) | "Risky (Remix)" (2022) |

Music video
- "Fake It" on YouTube
- "Fake It" (Live) on YouTube

"Fake It" is a song by American Christian pop artist Tauren Wells featuring Aaron Cole. It was released on February 25, 2022, as the lead single from Wells' third album Joy in the Morning. Wells and Cole co-wrote the song with Chris Stevens and Emily Weisband. Chris Steven collaborated with Tedd T in producing the single.

"Fake It" peaked at No. 16 on the US Hot Christian Songs chart, and No. 8 on the Hot Gospel Songs chart. "Fake It" won the GMA Dove Award for Short Form Video of the Year (Performance) at the 2022 GMA Dove Awards.

== Background ==
Tauren Wells released "Fake It" featuring Aaron Cole on February 25, 2022, as the lead single from his upcoming album slated for release later in the year. "Fake It" marks Wells first release following his signing with Capitol Christian Music Group.

== Writing and development ==
In an interview with American Songwriter, Tauren Wells shared that the song came about from conversations about life in the studio, where Chris Stevens then shared a track he had which everyone got excited about and enjoyed. Wells then reached out to Aaron Cole for the writing of the bridge, with Cole responding within the hour.

== Composition ==
"Fake It" is composed in the key of C minor with a tempo of 115 beats per minute.

== Accolades ==
Awards
| Year | Organization | Award | Result | Ref |
|---|---|---|---|---|
| 2022 | GMA Dove Awards | Short Form Video of the Year (Performance) | Won | |

Year-end lists
| Publication | Accolade | Ref. |
|---|---|---|
| NewReleaseToday | Best of Christian Pop 2022 | |

== Commercial performance ==
"Fake It" debuted at number 31 on the US Christian Airplay chart dated March 5, 2022.

"Fake It" debuted at No. 26 on the US Hot Christian Songs, and No. 10 on the Hot Gospel Songs charts dated March 12, 2022.

== Music videos ==
Tauren Wells released the official visualizer for the song via YouTube on February 25, 2022. The official music video of "Fake It" premiered on Facebook exclusively on the same day. The video, filmed in Los Angeles, showcases Wells performing the song alongside Cole and a group of dancers. The music video was produced by Raj Kapoor and directed by Noah Clark. On February 27, 2022, the "Fake It" music video was availed on YouTube. On March 21, 2022, Tauren Wells released the live performance video of "Fake It" which was filmed at Vevo Studio in Brooklyn, New York.

Choreography by Alexander Chung

== Track listing ==
"Fake It"
| No. | Title | Writer(s) | Length |
|---|---|---|---|
| 1. | "Fake It" (featuring Aaron Cole) | Aaron Cole; Chris Stevens; Emily Weisband; Tauren Wells | 3:06 |

"Fake It" — Re-release
| No. | Title | Length |
|---|---|---|
| 1. | "Fake It" (featuring Aaron Cole) | 3:06 |
| 2. | "Fake It" (featuring Aaron Cole and Neon Feather; Warehouse Mix) | 2:17 |
| 3. | "Fake It" (Live) | 3:09 |
| Total length: | | 8:33 |

Fake It — Apple Music re-release bonus content
| No. | Title | Length |
|---|---|---|
| 4. | "Fake It" (featuring Aaron Cole; Music video) | 3:10 |
| Total length: | | 11:42 |

== Personnel ==
Adapted from AllMusic.

- Josh Bailey — A&R
- Aaron Cole — featured artist, vocals
- John Greenham — mastering engineer
- Jake Halm — co-arranger, editing, engineer, mixing, programmer
- Javier Solís — engineer, percussion
- Chris Stevens — co-arranger, editing, engineer, producer, programmer, vocals
- Tedd T — co-arranger, editing, engineer, mixing, producer, programmer
- Emily Weisband — vocals
- Tauren Wells — primary artist, vocals
- Cory Wong — engineer, guitar

== Charts ==
=== Weekly charts ===
Weekly chart performance for "Fake It"
| Chart (2022) | Peak position |
|---|---|
| US Hot Christian Songs (Billboard) | 16 |
| US Christian Airplay (Billboard) | 17 |
| US Christian AC (Billboard) | 19 |
| US Gospel Songs (Billboard) | 8 |

=== Year-end charts ===
Year-end chart performance for "Fake It"
| Chart (2022) | Position |
|---|---|
| US Christian Songs (Billboard) | 64 |
| US Gospel Songs (Billboard) | 15 |

== Release history ==
| Region | Date | Version | Format | Label | Ref. |
|---|---|---|---|---|---|
| Various | February 25, 2022 | Original | Digital download; streaming | Sparrow Records; Capitol Christian Music Group | |
| United States | March 18, 2022 | Original | Christian radio | Sparrow Records; Capitol Christian Music Group | |
| Various | March 25, 2022 | Re-release (multi-track single) | Digital download; streaming | Sparrow Records; Capitol Christian Music Group | |
