= God's Not Done with You =

"God's Not Done With You"

Single by Tauren Wells

from the album Hills and Valleys
- Released: April 5, 2019
- Recorded: 2017
- Genre: Christian R&B; Christian pop
- Length: 3:15
- Label: Provident Label Group
- Songwriters: Tauren Wells; Bernie Herms; Emily Weisband
- Producer: Bernie Herms

Tauren Wells singles chronology
"Echo" (2018)	"God's Not Done With You" (2019)	"Like You Love Me" (2019)

Music video
- "God's Not Done With You" on YouTube

"God's Not Done With You" is a song by American Christian pop artist Tauren Wells. It was released on April 5, 2019, as the sixth single from his debut studio album, Hills and Valleys (2017). Wells co-wrote the song with Bernie Herms and Emily Weisband, with production being handled by Bernie Herms. The song peaked at No. 6 on the US Hot Christian Songs chart, registering as his fifth top ten single.

== Background ==
In July 2017, Tauren Wells, in a special interview where he spoke about the songs on his album, Hills and Valleys (2017), with Caitlin Lassiter of NewReleaseToday. Sharing the story behind "God's Not Done With You", Wells said:

"God's Not Done With You" is a song for the person who feels disqualified by their past guilt and shame to say that God has the ability, He's actually a master architect, and He specializes in building on what remains in your life. If all you have is ruins, then ruins will be what He uses to recreate the great design that He has for your life.

In another NewReleaseToday interview, with Jake Frederick, Wells stated that the song would be his next single, having reworked the song with producer Bernie Herms. The song impacted Christian radio in April 2018.

== Composition ==
"God's Not Done With You" is a pop song, composed in the key of D-flat major with a tempo of 140 beats per minute. Wells' vocal range spans from G♭_{3} to D♭_{5}.

== Music video ==
The official music video of "God's Not Done With You" was availed on Tauren Wells' YouTube channel on May 10, 2019. It features Wells performing the song on a piano in a burning field with scenes of people dealing with difficult situations such as ill-health and marital troubles. The music video garnered over 14 million views as of October 2020.

== Accolades ==
Year	Organization	Award	Result	Ref.
2020	Grammy Award	Best Contemporary Christian Music Performance	Nominated	

== Track listing ==
"God's Not Done With You" — Digital format
No.	Title	Length
1.	"God's Not Done With You" (Single Version)	3:15
2.	"God's Not Done With You"	3:32
3.	"God's Not Done With You" (Original Demo)	3:23
Total length:		10:10

== Charts ==
=== Weekly charts ===
Chart (2019)	Peak position
US Hot Christian Songs (Billboard)	6
US Christian Airplay (Billboard)	2
US Christian AC (Billboard)	2
US Christian AC Indicator (Billboard)	3

=== Year-end charts ===
Chart (2019)	Position
US Christian Songs (Billboard)	12
US Christian Airplay (Billboard)	6
US Christian CHR (Billboard)	6
US Christian AC (Billboard)	10

== Release history ==
Region	Date	Format	Label	Ref.
Various	April 5, 2019	Digital download; streaming	Provident Label Group	
United States	April 19, 2019	Christian AC radio; Christian hot AC radio; Christian modern AC radio; Christian contemporary hit radio	Provident Label Group	
