= The Jesus I Know Now =

Single by Brandon Lake and Lainey Wilson
- Released: April 3, 2026
- Genre: Country worship; southern gospel
- Length: 3:33
- Label: Provident; Sony
- Songwriters: Lake; Wilson; Emily Weisband; Luke Laird
- Producers: Jacob Sooter; Hank Bentley

Brandon Lake singles chronology
"Just Believe" (2026)	"The Jesus I Know Now" (2026)	"The Author" (2026)

Lainey Wilson singles chronology
"Somewhere Over Laredo" (2025)	"The Jesus I Know Now" (2026)	"Phone, Keys, Wallet" (2026)

"The Jesus I Know Now" is a song recorded by the American singers Brandon Lake and Lainey Wilson. The song was released as a single on April 3, 2026, via Provident Label Group and Sony Music Group, to digital download and streaming formats. The song was written by Lake, Wilson, Emily Weisband, and Luke Laird, while Jacob Sooter and Hank Bentley produced.

== Release and promotion ==
"The Jesus I Know Now" was announced predating its release. The track was announced via previews of the song, which were released through social media platforms. Lake had been teasing the song's release since November 2025, until later announcing its release the week before it was scheduled. Upon its release, the song was promoted with a music video, which was uploaded to YouTube.

== Background ==
"The Jesus I Know Now" is one of several songs released or teased by Lake in collaboration with a mainstream country musician. One of the first examples of this includes "Hard Fought Hallelujah", a song by him and Jelly Roll, which was released in November 2024 to great commercial acclaim. The song won the Grammy Award for Best Contemporary Christian Music Performance/Song and completed 2025 as, not only the best-selling Christian song of the year, but also the 84th best selling song of the year overall in the United States. In addition to these songs, Lake also hosted a writers' retreat in Nashville, Tennessee, in which he and twenty-five other country musicians wrote forty-three Christianity-themed songs. Wilson was among the retreat's attendees, as well as other notable country musicians such as Thomas Rhett, Tyler Hubbard, Dan + Shay, and Bailey Zimmerman.

== Style ==
=== Composition and production ===
"The Jesus I Know Now" is piano‑driven and contains an atmospheric arrangement. Holler described the track as being "cut from the same rousing, piano-driven fabric as classic Lake anthems such as 'Gratitude', 'As For Me & My Home', and 'When a Cowboy Prays' ". The song opens with "atmospheric, reverb-laden keys", before Lake's "heartfelt, commanding vocals" lead the first verse, followed by Wilson's "enchanting, sincere delivery" in the second. The track's mid‑tempo speed and piano‑centered production demonstrate Lake's worship roots, while Wilson's phrasing and melodic styles introduce country influence. Jubilee Cast described the final sound as a "testimony-driven narrative" that "blends Lake's worship-rooted passion with Wilson's grounded country storytelling". In a similar vein, Whiskey Riff noted that the song is "the perfect track to play over Easter".

"The Jesus I Know Now" is composed in the key of B-flat, with a speed of 72 beats per minute and a time signature of 4/4. The song demonstrates the styles of country worship and southern gospel.

=== Lyrics and meaning ===
Lyrically, "The Jesus I Know Now" is written about Lake's fear‑based childhood understanding of Jesus, as opposed to a more compassionate, relational view which he developed later on in life. The song was inspired by a conversation in which Wilson told Lake, "You know, the Jesus I know now isn't really like the Jesus I grew up being taught about". This theme is demonstrated throughout the verses, which recount teachings that portrayed Jesus as "angry", "distant", and "judgmental", causing the belief that behaviors such as smoking, drinking, or using profanity would place someone "on a long black train to Hell", whereas they would be saved if they. A later addition describes how commercial success as a musician left Wilson feeling unfulfilled. In contrast, the chorus describes a Jesus who "hangs with the misfits, listens, forgives and forgives again".

== Reception ==
=== Critical ===
"The Jesus I Know Now" received positive reception from critics. Billboard's Jessica Nicholson noted that the song "chronicles a maturation of faith over the years", emphasizing its message of rediscovering a more relational Jesus. Casey Young of Whiskey Riff praised the track as "the perfect song to play over Easter", describing it as "honest". Writing for Holler, Maxim Mower described the song as "beautifully evocative and thought-provoking". Timothy Yap of JubileeCast described the track as "a testimony-driven narrative" that combines both Lake's worship styles with Wilson's country styles, while Lindsay Williams of Air1 believed that the song would "meet you right where you are this Good Friday".

=== Commercial ===
"The Jesus I Know Now" was commercially successful upon its release, both in the United States and internationally. The track opened on the Billboard Bubbling Under Hot 100 Singles chart at number 21, while on the Digital Song Sales chart, it peaked at number 5. On the Hot Country Songs and Hot Christian Songs charts, it peaked at number 8 and 42, respectively. On Recorded Music NZ's New Zealand Hot Singles chart, "The Jesus I Know Now" peaked at number 31.

=== Accolades ===
Year	Organization	Category	Result	Ref.
2026	Dove Awards	Country/Roots Recorded Song of the Year	Won	
2027	Grammy Awards	Best Contemporary Christian Music Performance/Song	Pending	

== Personnel ==
Credits adapted from Spotify.

- Brandon Lake – writer
- Emily Weisband – writer
- Jacob Sooter – producer
- Hank Bentley – producer
- Lainey Wilson – writer
- Luke Laird – writer
- Matt Huber – mixer
- Sam Moses – masterer

== Charts ==
Weekly chart performance for "The Jesus I Know Now"
Chart (2026)	Peak position
New Zealand Hot Singles (RMNZ)	31
US Bubbling Under Hot 100 (Billboard)	21
US Digital Song Sales (Billboard)	5
US Hot Christian Songs (Billboard)	8
US Hot Country Songs (Billboard)	42

== Release history ==
Release history for "The Jesus I Know Now"
Region	Date	Format	Label	Ref.
Various	April 3, 2026	Digital download; streaming	Provident Label Group; Sony Music Group	
United States	April 3, 2026	Christian radio	Provident Label Group; Sony Music Group	
