= Fake It =

Fake It may refer to:

- Fake it till you make it, a concept that suggests imitating qualities can lead to a realization of those qualities in a person's life
- "Fake It" (Bastille song), a 2016 song by Bastille
- "Fake It" (Seether song), a 2007 song by Seether
- "Fake It" (Tauren Wells song), a 2022 song by Tauren Wells featuring Aaron Cole
- Fake It, a song by Hyomin from her 2014 EP Make Up
- "Fake It", B-side of "Nee" (Perfume song), a 2010 song by Perfume
- Fake It Flowers, a 2020 album by Beabadoobee
