= Echo (Elevation Worship song) =

Single by Elevation Worship featuring Tauren Wells

from the album Hallelujah Here Below
- Released: August 31, 2018
- Recorded: March 2018
- Venue: Elevation Ballantyne, Charlotte, North Carolina, US
- Genre: Christian pop, Contemporary worship music
- Length: 3:56 (Live version); 3:46 (Studio version)
- Label: Elevation Worship Records
- Songwriters: Steven Furtick; Chris Brown; Israel Houghton; Matthews Ntlele; Alexander Pappas
- Producers: Chris Brown; Aaron Robertson

Elevation Worship singles chronology
"Here Again" (2018)	"Echo" (2018)	"Hallelujah Here Below" (2018)

Tauren Wells singles chronology
"Known" (2018)	"Echo" (2018)	"God's Not Done With You" (2019)

Music videos
- "Echo" (Live) on YouTube
- "Echo" (Paradoxology) on YouTube

"Echo" is a song performed by American contemporary worship band Elevation Worship featuring Tauren Wells, released as the third single from Elevation Worship's eleventh live album, Hallelujah Here Below (2018), on August 31, 2018. The song was written by Alexander Pappas, Chris Brown, Israel Houghton, Matthews Ntlele and Steven Furtick. Chris Brown and Aaron Robertson handled the production of the single.

== Background ==
In leading up to the September 2018 release of Hallelujah Here Below, "Echo" was released as the third single from the album, following the release of singles "Won't Stop Now" and "Here Again". The song was recorded in March 2018 at Elevation Ballantyne in Charlotte, North Carolina. Tauren Wells, in an interview with Jake Frederick of NewReleaseToday, shared that the collaboration came about after he connected with people from Elevation Church at the Inside Elevation conference. When he returned to Elevation Church another weekend to lead worship, where he led the song upon request before they asked him to feature on the song as part of the album. Wells described the song as "one of those songs that brings so much energy and joy into a room."

On February 1, 2019, a Spanish rendition of the song, titled "Eco (Echo)" was released by Elevation Worship. On April 12, 2019, a revamped version of "Echo" was released on Elevation Worship's album Paradoxology (2019), a collection of revamped songs initially released on Hallelujah Here Below. The song, garnering early airplay from several radio stations, was set to impact Christian radio on July 26, 2019.

== Composition ==
"Echo" is composed in the key of D major with a tempo of 104 beats per minute, and a musical time signature of 4/4.

== Music videos ==
Elevation Worship released the live music video of "Echo" featuring Tauren Wells recorded at Elevation Church's Ballantyne campus on their YouTube channel on August 31, 2018. On February 1, 2019, The lyric video of "Eco (Echo)" in Spanish was published on YouTube. The music video for the Paradoxology rendition of "Echo" shot on location at Savona Mill was published on Elevation Worship's YouTube channel on April 13, 2019.

== Track listing ==
"Echo"
No.	Title	Writer(s)	Length
1.	"Echo" (featuring Tauren Wells)	Steven Furtick; Chris Brown; Israel Houghton; Matthews Ntlele; Alexander Pappas	3:56

"Eco" (Spanish version)
No.	Title	Translator(s)	Length
1.	"Eco" (in Spanish)	Crystal Velez; Edgar Aguilar; Abraham Osorio; Lucas Consuegra; Evan Craft; Isaac Moraleja; Job Gonzalez	3:47

"Echo" (Studio version)
No.	Title	Length
1.	"Echo" (Studio version; featuring Tauren Wells)	3:46

== Charts ==
=== Weekly charts ===
Original version
Chart (2018–20)	Peak position
US Hot Christian Songs (Billboard)	18
US Christian Airplay (Billboard)	11

Paradoxology version
Chart (2019)	Peak position
US Hot Christian Songs (Billboard)	32

=== Year-end charts ===
Chart (2019)	Position
US Christian Airplay (Billboard)	40

== Certifications ==
Region	Certification	Certified units/sales
United States (RIAA)	Gold	500,000^{‡}
^{‡} Sales+streaming figures based on certification alone.

== Release history ==
Region	Version	Date	Format	Label	Ref.
Various	Live	August 31, 2018	Digital download; streaming	Elevation Worship Records	
Various	Spanish	February 1, 2019	Digital download; streaming	Elevation Worship Records	
Various	Studio	July 26, 2019	Digital download; streaming	Elevation Worship Records	
United States	Studio	July 26, 2019	Christian radio	Elevation Worship Records	
