= Phone, Keys, Wallet =

2026 single by Lainey Wilson and John Mayer

Single by Lainey Wilson and John Mayer
- Released: June 4, 2026
- Studio: Chaplin Studios
- Genre: Country
- Length: 2:52
- Label: This is Hit; BBR
- Songwriters: Lainey Wilson; Kid Harpoon; Jon Decious; Dan Pellarin; Dallas Wilson; Trannie Anderson; Summer Overstreet
- Producers: Kid Harpoon; John Mayer

Lainey Wilson singles chronology
"The Jesus I Know Now" (2026)	"Phone, Keys, Wallet" (2026)

John Mayer singles chronology
"Wild Blue" (2021)	"Phone, Keys, Wallet" (2026)	"Tom and Jerry" (2026)

Music video
- "Phone, Keys, Wallet" on YouTube

"Phone, Keys, Wallet" is a song by American singers Lainey Wilson and John Mayer. It was released on June 4, 2026 as the lead single from Wilson's upcoming sixth studio album. The song was written by Wilson, Kid Harpoon, Jon Decious, Dan Pellarin, Dallas Wilson, Trannie Anderson and Summer Overstreet, while Harpoon and Mayer produced it.

== Background ==
Lainey Wilson wrote the song during the final leg of her Whirlwind World Tour and recorded it at Chaplin Studios in Los Angeles. In a press statement, she said "I feel like a tornado with boots on half the time, and this song is really about finding somebody who's okay with that chaos and chooses to love you through it anyway." The song is believed to be an ode to her husband, Devlin "Duck" Hodges, whom she married in May 2026.

== Composition ==
In the song, Lainey Wilson describes her hectic life and occasional scatterbrained nature. Despite this, she sings she will never forget the people, possessions and influences that are most important to her: Jesus, George Jones' music, her mother, phone, keys, wallet, and husband. In essence, she appreciates her husband for embracing her flaws and loving her as she is. John Mayer does not contribute vocals, but plays electric and acoustic guitar on the song, including a solo for the breakdown.

== Charts ==
Chart performance for "Phone, Keys, Wallet"
Chart (2026)	Peak position
Canada Hot 100 (Billboard)	42
Canada Country (Billboard)	1
New Zealand Hot Singles (RMNZ)	13
US Billboard Hot 100	43
US Country Airplay (Billboard)	9
US Hot Country Songs (Billboard)	12
