= Let the Church Sing =

EP by Tauren Wells
- Released: March 21, 2025
- Length: 22:55
- Label: Sparrow Records; Capitol Records/Capitol CMG
- Producer: Jordan Sapp; Jonathan Smith; Chris Strawder; Demetri Wells; Chuck Butler

Tauren Wells chronology
| Take It All Back (2023) | Let the Church Sing (2025) | Breathe on It (2026) |

Singles from Let the Church Sing
- 1. "Making Room" Released: November 1, 2024; 2. "Thank You for the Cross" Released: January 31, 2025

Let the Church Sing is an extended play by the American Christian pop musician Tauren Wells. The EP was released on March 21, 2025 though Sparrow Records and Capitol/Capitol CMG. It was inspired by his work with the Church of Whitestone in Austin, Texas, which he pastors and had founded in January 2024. The church set the record for the largest attendance of any American church within the first day, with more than 4,000 attendants.

== Background ==
Let the Church Sing served as a precursor to Wells' fourth studio album, Breathe on It. He stated about the EP that its songs were initially written in 2022-2023. The first single released was "Making Room", released on November 1, 2024. The following single, "Thank You for the Cross", was released on January 31, 2025.

Let the Church Sing was inspired by his work with the Church of Whitestone in Austin, Texas, which he pastors and had founded in January 2024. The church set the record for the largest attendance of any American church within the first day, with more than 4,000 attendants. Wells stated that "A lot of songs came from the birth of our church." Following the release of the EP, Wells released a book, titled Joy Bomb: Unleash Jesus’s Explosive Joy for an Extraordinary Life. The book was endorsed by Steph Curry, Joel Osteen, and Mike Todd, and featured a foreword by Steven Furtick of Elevation Church. It was released on May 20, 2025, through Zondervan Books.

== Accolades ==
At the 2026 Grammy Awards, Let the Church Sing was nominated for the award of Best Contemporary Christian Music Album.

| Year | Organization | Nominee / work | Category | Result | Ref. |
|---|---|---|---|---|---|
| 2025 | We Love Awards | "Let the Church Sing" | Pop Song of the Year | Won | |
| 2026 | Grammy Awards | Let the Church Sing | Best Contemporary Christian Music Album | Nominated | |

== Commercial performance ==
The song "Making Room" peaked at No. 45 on the Billboard Hot Christian Songs chart. The title track of the EP, "Let the Church Sing", went on to reach peak positions of No. 22 on the Hot Christian Songs, No. 11 on the Christian Airplay chart, and No. 7 on the Christian Adult Contemporary chart.

== Track listing ==
| No. | Title | Writer(s) | Producer(s) | Length |
|---|---|---|---|---|
| 1. | "Let the Church Sing" | Tauren Wells; Jordan Sapp | Jordan Sapp | 2:56 |
| 2. | "Thank You For the Cross" | T. Wells; Colby Wedgeworth; Jonathan Smith | Jonathan Smith; Chris Strawder | 4:30 |
| 3. | "The Room is Yours" (with Robert Angel) | T. Wells; Daifah Davies; Demetri Wells | Demetri Wells | 5:10 |
| 4. | "Making Room" | T. Wells; Sapp | Sapp | 4:21 |
| 5. | "Not Guilty" | T. Wells; Chuck Butler; Lorna Wells | Chuck Butler | 5:57 |
| Total length: | | | | 22:55 |
