= Tauren Wells =

American singer-songwriter (born 1986)

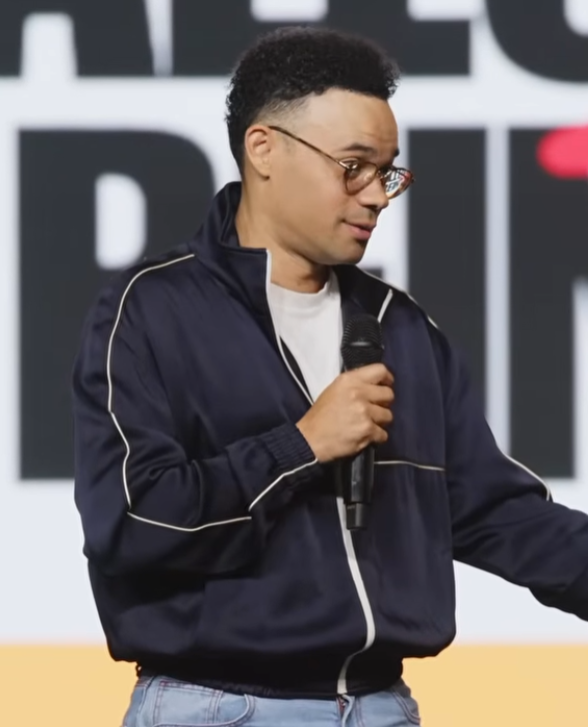
- Wells in 2025
- Born: Tauren Gabriel Wells; April 7, 1986 (age 40); Battle Creek, Michigan, U.S.
- Occupations: Singer; songwriter; pastor
- Years active: 2004–present
- Spouse: Lorna Macey (m. 2011)
- Children: 4
- Musical career
- Genres: Christian pop; Christian hip hop; Christian R&B
- Labels: Sparrow; Capitol Christian; Reunion
- Formerly of: Royal Tailor
- Website: taurenwells.com

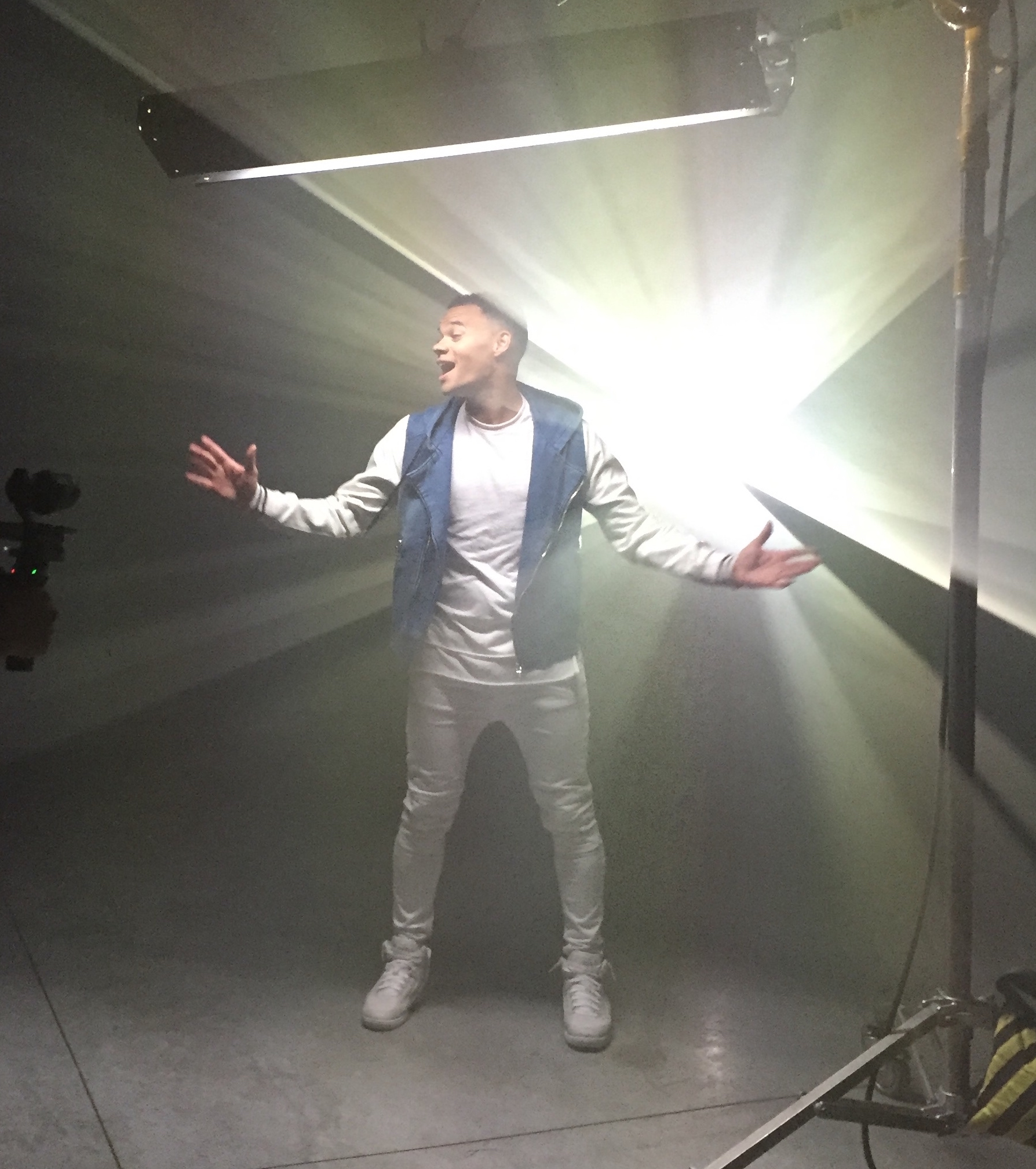
Wells in 2016

Tauren Gabriel Wells (born April 7, 1986) is an American Contemporary Christian music singer-songwriter and pastor from Houston, Texas. Wells was the frontman of former Christian band Royal Tailor.

After the group's disbandment in 2015, he released Undefeated EP in 2016, followed by his first studio album Hills and Valleys, released in June 2017. The album and its lead single "Hills and Valleys" received nominations at the 60th Grammy Awards in 2018. Its fifth single "Known" topped the Billboard Christian Airplay chart and was nominated for Top Christian Song at the 2019 Billboard Music Awards.

Wells' second studio album Citizen of Heaven was released in January 2020. The album and one of its singles, "Famous For (I Believe)" – his third Christian Airplay No. 1 – were nominated at the 63rd Grammy Awards in 2021. His third album Joy in the Morning was released in June 2022, followed by his second EP Take It All Back in 2023. In 2024, Wells became a lead pastor at a church in Austin, Texas, planted by him and his wife Lorna.

== Career ==
At the age of sixteen, Wells felt called to serve God. He was a founding member of Royal Tailor along with DJ Cox and Blake Hubbard while they were attending Indiana Bible College, a Oneness Apostolic college, in 2004. Jarred Ingram later joined. Wells toured with Christian band Casting Crowns in 2012.

=== 2016–2018: Undefeated EP and Hills and Valleys ===
In 2016, Wells signed with Reunion Records as a solo artist and released his first single "Undefeated" in May, featuring rapper KB. It served as the soundtrack for Dude Perfect's "World Records Edition" video on YouTube. Wells released his second single "Love Is Action" in August and his first EP, titled Undefeated EP, on September 12. "Love Is Action" was No. 1 on Christian Hot AC/CHR Radio for nine weeks.

In January 2017, Wells released "Hills and Valleys", which reached No. 8 on the Christian Airplay Chart and No. 3 on the Hot Christian Songs chart. His first studio album Hills and Valleys was released digitally on June 23, and physically on July 21. The fourth single, "When We Pray", was released on October 20 and peaked at No. 7. He was featured on Crowder's "All My Hope". The single peaked at No. 3 on the Christian Songs chart and No. 1 on the Christian Airplay chart, becoming his first number one. In mid-2017, he accompanied American singers Lionel Richie and Mariah Carey on their All the Hits Tour as the opening act.

In 2018, Wells received Grammy nominations for Best Contemporary Christian Performance/Song and Contemporary Christian Album of the Year, but did not win either. In the same year, he also became a worship leader at Lakewood Church in Houston, Texas.

The fifth single, "Known", was released on June 23, 2018. The song peaked at No. 3 on the US Hot Christian Songs chart, becoming his fourth Top 10 single from that chart. It topped multiple Christian radio charts including Christian Airplay and Christian AC Songs, and it was nominated for the 2019 Grammy Award for Best Contemporary Christian Music Performance/Song. It was also nominated for Top Christian Song at the 2019 Billboard Music Awards.

=== 2019–2023: Citizen of Heaven, Joy in the Morning and Take It All Back ===
In January 2020, Wells released his second studio album Citizen of Heaven. The album was supported by lead single "Like You Love Me", accompanied by "Famous For (I Believe)", featuring Bethel Music singer Jenn Johnson. A music video for "Millionaire (Good Like That)", featuring Kirk Franklin, released on August 24. "Famous For (I Believe)", which had its own EP released in December 2020, topped the Billboard Christian Airplay chart in January 2021, and received a nomination along with Citizen of Heaven at the 63rd Grammy Awards that same year.

In March 2021, Wells collaborated with American R&B singer H.E.R. to release "Hold Us Together (Hope Mix)". He released Citizen of Heaven LIVE on April 16, 2021, through Essential Records. To accompany the album, he released four music videos which were recorded during Citizen of Heaven's launch event at Lakewood Church in January 2020.

On February 25, 2022, Wells released "Fake It", featuring Christian rapper Aaron Cole, as the lead single to his third studio album Joy in the Morning, which was released on June 10, 2022. "Empty" and "Come Home" was released as singles. He released his third EP Take It All Back on August 18, 2023.

=== 2023–present: Lead pastor at Church of Whitestone ===
In April 2023, Wells revealed plans to launch a church in 2024 with his wife Lorna. In 2024, the Church of Whitestone was launched in Austin, Texas, where they both serve as lead pastors. In 2024, he announced an upcoming book.

On November 1, 2024, Wells released a single titled "Making Room". It was announced that this would be the title track of an upcoming album.

== Personal life ==
Wells married his wife Lorna Brittany (née Macey) Wells in 2011. Wells served on the staff of his father-in-law's church in Houston known as Royalwood Church until 2018. Wells and his wife Lorna started the Prisma Worship Arts School, to train musicians. Together, they have four sons. The oldest, Kanaan, was born in 2013. Their second son, Lawson Mayer, was born in 2016. Their third son, Navy Elliot, was born in 2018. Their fourth son, Banner Paul, was born in 2021. The family lives in Austin, Texas.

== Discography ==
=== Studio albums ===
List of selected albums, with selected chart positions
Title	Album details	Peak chart positions		
Title	Album details	US	US Christ	UK C&G
Hills and Valleys	Released: June 23, 2017; Label: Reunion Records; Format: CD, digital download, streaming	—	5	—
Citizen of Heaven	Released: January 24, 2020; Label: Reunion Records; Format: CD, digital download, streaming	169	3	14
Joy in the Morning	Released: June 10, 2022; Label: Capitol CMG; Format: CD, LP, digital download, streaming	— (Note: Joy in the Morning did not enter the Billboard 200, but peaked at No. 48 on the Billboard Top Album Sales)	3	—
Breathe on It	Released: May 1, 2026; Label: Sparrow/Capitol CMG; Format: Digital download, streaming	—	28	—
"—" denotes a recording that did not chart

=== Live albums ===
List of live albums
Title	Album details	Peak chart positions
Title	Album details	US Christ
Citizen of Heaven (Live)	Released: April 16, 2021; Label: Essential Records; Format: CD, digital download, streaming	—
Here Comes the Church	Releasing: October 2, 2026; Label: Sparrow/Capitol CMG; Format: CD, LP, digital download, streaming	9
"—" denotes a recording that did not chart

=== Extended plays ===
List of EPs, with selected chart positions
Title	EP details	Peak chart positions
Title	EP details	US Christ
Undefeated EP	Released: September 12, 2016; Preview of LP; Label: Reunion Records; CD, digital download, streaming	33
Conocido EP	Released: March 8, 2019; Label: Reunion Records; Digital download, streaming	—
Take It All Back EP	Released: August 18, 2023; Label: Capitol CMG; Digital download, streaming	34
Let the Church Sing	Released: March 21, 2025; Label: Sparrow Records, Capitol CMG; Formats: Digital download, streaming	—
"—" denotes a recording that did not chart

=== Singles ===
==== As lead artist ====
List of singles, with selected chart positions and certifications, showing year released and album name
Title	Year	Peak chart positions							Certifications	Album
Title	Year	US Bubb.	US Christ.	US Christ. Air	US Christ. AC	US Christ. Digital	NZ Hot	UK Cross	Certifications	Album
"Undefeated" (featuring KB)	2016	—	—	—	—	—	—	—		Hills and Valleys
"Love Is Action"	2016	—	49	30	—	—	—	—		Hills and Valleys
"Hills and Valleys"	2017	—	3	8	12	3	—	5	RIAA: Platinum	Hills and Valleys
"When We Pray"	2017	—	7	2	2	19	—	—		Hills and Valleys
"Known"	2018	—	3	1	1	5	—	4	RIAA: Platinum	Hills and Valleys
"God's Not Done with You"	2019	—	6	2	2	10	—	—	RIAA: Gold	Hills and Valleys
"Like You Love Me"	2019	—	17	14	11	—	—	1		Citizen of Heaven
"Famous For (I Believe)" (featuring Jenn Johnson)	2020	15	3	1	2	5	—	—	RIAA: Gold	Citizen of Heaven
"Until Grace" (with Rascal Flatts)	2020	—	11	7	8	18	—	—		Citizen of Heaven
"All God's Children"	2020	—	29	—	—	11	—	—		Non-album singles
"Hold Us Together (Hope Mix)" (with H.E.R.)	2021	—	20	50	—	18	—	8		Non-album singles
"Merry Christmas, Happy Holidays"	2021	—	—	—	—	—	—	2		Non-album singles
"Fake It" (featuring Aaron Cole)	2022	—	16	17	17	15	—	—		Joy in the Morning
"Joy in the Morning"	2022	—	27	27	—	6	31	—		Joy in the Morning
"Something Better" (with Blanca)	2023	—	12	14	22	—	—	—		Non-album single
"Take It All Back" (with We the Kingdom and Davies)	2023	—	3	1	1	1	—	1	RIAA: Gold	Non-album single
"Making Room"	2024	—	45	—	—	—	—	—		Breathe on It
"Thank You For the Cross"	2025	—	—	—	—	—	—	—		Breathe on It
"Fight Like Heaven"	2025	—	—	—	—	—	—	—		Non-album singles
"Soul on Fire"	2025	—	—	—	—	—	—	—		Non-album singles
"The Church Is on Fire"	2025	—	—	—	—	—	—	—		Breathe on It
"Here Comes the Church"	2025	—	—	—	—	—	—	—		Breathe on It
"Second to None" (with Miles Minnick)	2025	—	—	—	—	—	—	—		Non-album single
"Breathe on It"	2026	—	8	3	7	—	—	—		Breathe on It
"Bless Your Name"	2026	—	14	—	—	—	—	—		Breathe on It
"Sunday Morning" (with Pastor Mike Jr.)	2026	—	— (Note: "Sunday Morning" did not enter the Billboard Hot Christian Songs chart, but peaked at number 21 on the Hot Gospel Songs chart.)	—	—	—	—	—		Breathe on It
"—" denotes a recording that did not chart

==== As featured artist ====
Title	Year	Peak chart positions				Certifications	Album
Title	Year	US Christ	Christ Airplay	US Christ. AC	US Christ. Digital	Certifications	Album
"All My Hope" (Crowder featuring Tauren Wells)	2017	3	1	2	1		Non-album single
"War Cry" (Social Club Misfits featuring Tauren Wells)	2018	32	27	—	—		Into the Night
"Echo" (Elevation Worship featuring Tauren Wells)	2018	18	11	9	17	RIAA: Gold	Hallelujah Here Below
"O Holy Night" (Tommee Profitt featuring Tauren Wells)	2020	34	27	11	—		The Birth of a King
"Like You" (Aaron Cole featuring Tauren Wells and TobyMac)	2021	—	—	—	—		Two Up Two Down
"Deeper" (TobyMac featuring Tauren Wells)	2022	—	—	—	—		Life After Death
"—" denotes a recording that did not chart

=== Promotional singles ===
Title	Year	Peak chart positions			Album
Title	Year	US Christ	Christ Airplay	UK Cross	Album
"Millionaire (Good Like That)" (with Kirk Franklin)	2020	—	—	1	Citizen of Heaven
"Miracle"	2020	38	—	1	Citizen of Heaven
"Close" (featuring Steven Furtick)	2020	43	28	1	Citizen of Heaven
"Perfect Peace"	2020	—	—	—	Citizen of Heaven
"Trenches" (with Donald Lawrence & Company)	2020	41	—	—	non-album single
"Empty"	2022	48	—	—	Joy in the Morning
"Come Home"	2022	—	—	5	Joy in the Morning
"Merry Christmas, Happy Holiday"	2025	— (Note: "Merry Christmas, Happy Holiday" did not enter the Billboard Hot Christian Songs chart, but peaked at number 25 on the Christian Streaming Songs chart.)	—	—	non-album singles
"Take It All Back" (acoustic)	2026	—	—	—	non-album singles
"—" denotes a recording that did not chart

=== Other charted songs ===
==== As lead artist ====
Single	Year	Chart positions				Album
Single	Year	US Christ	US Christ. Air	US Christ. AC	UK Cross	Album
"Citizen of Heaven"	2020	48	—	—	1	Citizen of Heaven
"Up"	2023	29	—	—	3	Joy in the Morning
"Let the Church Sing"	2025	22	11	7	—	Breathe on It
"How Great" (with Phil Wickham and Hulvey)	2026	31	—	—	—	Breathe on It
"What a Miracle Feels Like"	2026	22	—	—	—	Breathe on It
"—" denotes a recording that did not chart

==== As featured artist ====
Title	Year	Peak chart positions		Album
Title	Year	US Christ	US Christ. Digital	Album
"Never Lost" (Elevation Worship featuring Tauren Wells)	2020	31	17	Graves into Gardens
"I Give You My Dreams" (Sarai Rivera featuring Tauren Wells)	2025	50	—	Suelto EP (Deluxe)

== Awards and nominations ==
=== Grammy Awards ===
Year	Nominee / work	Award	Result
2012	Black & White (with Royal Tailor)	Best Contemporary Christian Music Album	Nominated
2015	Royal Tailor (with Royal Tailor)	Best Contemporary Christian Music Album	Nominated
2018	"Hills and Valleys"	Best Contemporary Christian Music Performance/Song	Nominated
2018	Hills and Valleys	Best Contemporary Christian Music Album	Nominated
2019	"Known"	Best Contemporary Christian Music Performance/Song	Nominated
2020	"God's Not Done With You (Single Version)"	Best Contemporary Christian Music Performance/Song	Nominated
2021	"Famous For (I Believe)" (featuring Jenn Johnson)	Best Contemporary Christian Music Performance/Song	Nominated
2021	Citizen of Heaven	Best Contemporary Christian Music Album	Nominated
2022	"Hold Us Together (Hope Mix)"	Best Contemporary Christian Music Performance/Song	Nominated
2022	Citizen of Heaven (Live)	Best Contemporary Christian Music Album	Nominated
2026	Let the Church Sing	Best Contemporary Christian Music Album	Nominated
2027	Breathe on It	Best Contemporary Christian Music Album	Pending

=== Billboard Music Awards ===
Year	Nominee / work	Award	Result
2019	"Known"	Top Christian Song	Nominated
2021	"Famous For (I Believe)" (with Jenn Johnson)	Top Christian Song	Nominated

=== GMA Dove Awards ===
Year	Nominee / work	Award	Result
2012	Royal Tailor (as former frontman)	New Artist of the Year	Nominated
2017	Tauren Wells	New Artist of the Year	Won
2019	"Known"	Song of the Year	Nominated
2019	Tauren Wells	Contemporary Christian Artist of the Year	Nominated
2019	"Known"	Pop/Contemporary Recorded Song of the Year	Nominated
2020	Tauren Wells	Contemporary Christian Artist of the Year	Won
2020	Citizen of Heaven	Pop/Contemporary Album of the Year	Won
2020	Citizen of Heaven	Short Form Video of the Year	Nominated
2021	"Famous For (I Believe)"	Song of the Year	Nominated
2021	Tauren Wells	Contemporary Christian Artist of the Year	Nominated
2021	"Famous For (I Believe)"	Pop/Contemporary Recorded Song of the Year	Won
2022	"Fake It" (featuring Aaron Cole)	Short Form Video of the Year (Performance)	Won
2026	"Sunday Morning"	Contemporary Gospel Recorded Song of the Year	Pending
2026	Breathe on It	Worship Album of the Year	Pending
