= Hills and Valleys =

2017 song by Tauren Wells

Single by Tauren Wells

from the album Hills and Valleys
- Released: January 20, 2017
- Recorded: 2016
- Genre: Contemporary Christian music
- Length: 3:55
- Label: Reunion Records
- Songwriters: Chuck Butler; Jonathan Smith; Tauren Wells
- Producers: Chuck Butler; Brent Milligan; Jordan Sapp

Tauren Wells singles chronology
"Love Is Action" (2016)	"Hills and Valleys" (2017)	"All My Hope" (2017)

Music videos
- "Hills and Valleys" (Acoustic) on YouTube
- "Hills and Valleys" (Live) on YouTube
- "Hills and Valleys" (Lyrics) on YouTube

"Hills and Valleys" is a song performed by American Christian pop artist Tauren Wells. It was released on January 20, 2017, as the third single from Wells' debut studio album, Hills and Valleys (2017). Wells co-wrote the song with Chuck Butler and Jonathan Smith.

"Hills and Valleys" peaked at number three on the US Hot Christian Songs chart. "Hills and Valleys" garnered a Grammy Award nomination for Best Contemporary Christian Music Performance/Song at the 2018 Grammy Awards.

== Background ==
Tauren Wells released "Hills and Valleys" as a multi-track single, containing the original recording as found on the Undefeated EP; a remix version titled "The Hills Remix," and an acoustic piano-driven rendition dubbed "The Valleys Version." Tauren Wells shared the story behind the song, saying:

Initially when I was writing "Hills and Valleys," I wasn't trying to write a song. It was during worship time, and I was playing piano and singing melodies and that melody just came out on the keys. A quote came to mind, "on the mountaintops of life, learn to bow low, and in the valleys of life, learn to stand tall." I thought that would be cool to incorporate into a song, because I know that God is the God of the hills and valleys. Scripture points to that. I haven't heard much conversation or too many songs about what our posture should be when in the biggest moments in our lives and the lowest moments of our lives. I started wrapping that into a lyric and a melody and took it to some of my friends in Nashville, and we finished the song together.

== Composition ==
"Hills and Valleys" is composed in the key of D Major with a tempo of 84 beats per minute, and a musical time signature of 4/4.

== Accolades ==
Awards
Year	Organization	Award	Result
2018	Grammy Awards	Best Contemporary Christian Music Performance/Song	Nominated

== Music videos ==
Tauren Wells released the official acoustic video of "Hills and Valleys" on January 20, 2017, via YouTube. On January 27, 2017, Tauren Wells published an official lyric video YouTube. On June 23, 2017, Wells released audio videos for the original recording, the Hills Remix and the Valley Version of the song on YouTube. On April 30, 2021, Wells released an official live performance video that shows Wells performing the song and filmed at Lakewood Church in Houston, Texas.

== Track listing ==
"Hills and Valleys"
No.	Title	Length
1.	"Hills and Valleys"	3:55
2.	"Hills and Valleys" (The Hills Remix)	3:49
3.	"Hills and Valleys" (The Valleys Version)	4:09

== Charts ==
=== Weekly charts ===
Weekly chart performance for "Hills and Valleys"
Chart (2017)	Peak position
US Hot Christian Songs (Billboard)	3
US Christian Airplay (Billboard)	8
US Christian AC (Billboard)	12

=== Year-end charts ===
Year-end chart performance for "Hills and Valleys"
Chart (2017)	Peak position
US Christian Songs (Billboard)	7
US Christian Airplay (Billboard)	21
US Christian AC (Billboard)	27
US Christian CHR (Billboard)	7

== Certifications ==
Region	Certification	Certified units/sales
United States (RIAA)	Platinum	1,000,000^{‡}
^{‡} Sales+streaming figures based on certification alone.

== Release history ==
Region	Date	Format	Label	Ref.
Various	January 20, 2017	Digital download; streaming	Reunion Records	
