= Jeremy James (singer-songwriter) =

American musician

Jeremy James is a singer-songwriter based in Albany, NY. He plays acoustic guitar and mandolin. Jeremy James' music has been featured locally on area radio stations, and on internet radio.

== Performances ==
James has performed at Saratoga Springs, NY, storied venue Caffe Lena, Fagapalooza in New York City, Capital District Gay & Lesbian Community Council's Progressions Concert Series, Columbia University's Postcrypt Coffeehouse, Union College, Valentine's in Albany, New York, 60 Main Coffee House in New Paltz, Ballston Spa, New York's Old Iron Spring Festival, and Easton Mountain retreat center.

He has performed with Namoli Brennet, Adrianne, Chris Pureka, Kris Landherr, Mara Levi, and Nathan Duprey, among others.

== Broadcast ==
Jeremy James's music has been featured on internet radio station RadioioAcoustic and Albany, NY, area radio stations WEQX, WEXT, and WRPI.

== Discography ==
Jeremy James has released four independent albums to date:

1. Wasted Youth (2005)
2. Grey Gardens (2005)
3. Landlocked (2007)
4. Such Noble Men (2009)

Grey Gardens was not widely distributed, yet received some notice from independent reviewers.

Landlocked was recorded at Blue Sky Music Studios in Delmar, NY, and featured guest appearances by Namoli Brennet, Joely Schwenk, Scott Apicelli, Casey J. Chapman (of Almost Awake), Dave Shaver (of Almost Awake), and Gemma Halfi (of The Bookdrop Bees). Landlocked was released to critical acclaim from various publications and websites, including Roots Music Report, www.edgenewyork.com, Jed Ryan's Out Music Spotlight, Albany Times Union, and Albany's Metroland.

Landlocked was an editor's pick at Indie-Music.com and appeared in the national OutVoice Top 40 Chart of albums by LGBT artists for over a year, peaking at number 4 in August 2007. OutVoice voters ranked Landlocked as number 9 for 2007.

Such Noble Men was also recorded at Blue Sky Music Studios in Delmar, NY, and featured Katy Westfall, Donna Baird (of Scientific Maps and Sgt Dunbar & the Hobo Banned), Scott Apicelli (of Hair of the Dog), and Joely Schwenk.

James submitted his music to the Life Americana television show, but it has not yet been used. He also submitted music to Sing Out!, the folk music publisher.

James also performed on the group CD, Shine, a 2006 collection of performing artists from the Albany area.
