= Known (song) =

Single by Tauren Wells

from the album Hills and Valleys
- Released: June 23, 2018
- Recorded: 2017
- Genre: Christian rock, Christian pop, worship
- Length: 3:21
- Label: Reunion
- Songwriter(s): Ethan Hulse; Tauren Wells; Jordan Sapp
- Producer(s): Jordan Sapp

Tauren Wells singles chronology
| "War Cry" (2018) | "Known" (2018) | "Echo" (2018) |

Music video
- "Known" on YouTube

"Known" is a song by American Christian rock and pop artist Tauren Wells. The song was released as the fifth single from his 2017 album Hills And Valleys on June 23, 2018. The song peaked at No. 3 on the US Hot Christian Songs chart, becoming his fourth Top 10 single from that chart. It departed from the chart after 39 weeks. The song is played in a D-flat major key, and 78 beats per minute. It became his second Christian Airplay No. 1.

It was nominated for the 2019 Grammy Award for Best Contemporary Christian Music Performance/Song. It was also nominated for Top Christian Song at the 2019 Billboard Music Awards.

== Background ==
"Known" was released on June 23, 2018, as the fifth single from his debut studio album, Hills And Valleys. The song was inspired by a quote from Timothy Keller, saying, “to be loved and not known is comforting but superficial, to be known but not loved is our greatest fear. But to be fully known and fully loved is a lot like being loved by God.”

== Music video ==
A music video for the single "Known" was released on June 30, 2018. The visual features Wells performing the track on stage. The video garnered over 11 million views as of October 2020.

== Track listing ==
CD release

1. "Known" – 3:18
2. "Known (Lead Sheet (Medium Key)" – 3:18
3. "Known (Vocal Demonstration)" – 3:16
4. "Known (High Key With Background Vocals)" – 3:16
5. "Known (High Key Without Background Vocals)" – 3:16
6. "Known (Medium Key With Background Vocals)" – 3:16
7. "Known (Medium Key Without Background Vocals)" – 3:16
8. "Known (Low Key With Background Vocals)" – 3:16
9. "Known (Low Key Without Background Vocals)" – 3:16
- Digital download
1. "Known" – 3:18
- Digital download (Music Video Version)
1. "Known" – 3:14

== Charts ==
=== Weekly charts ===
| Chart (2018) | Peak position |
|---|---|
| US Christian AC (Billboard) | 1 |
| US Christian Airplay (Billboard) | 1 |
| US Christian Songs (Billboard) | 3 |
| US Christian AC Indicator (Billboard) | 1 |

=== Year-end charts ===
| Chart (2018) | Peak position |
|---|---|
| US Weekend 22 | 1 |
| US Christian CHR (Billboard) | 6 |
| US Christian AC (Billboard) | 31 |
| US Christian Airplay (Billboard) | 25 |
| US Christian Songs (Billboard) | 16 |

== Certifications ==
| Region | Certification | Certified units/sales |
|---|---|---|
| United States (RIAA) | Platinum | 1,000,000^{‡} |
^{‡} Sales+streaming figures based on certification alone.
