= Grammy Award for Best Contemporary Christian Music Performance/Song =

Annual music award

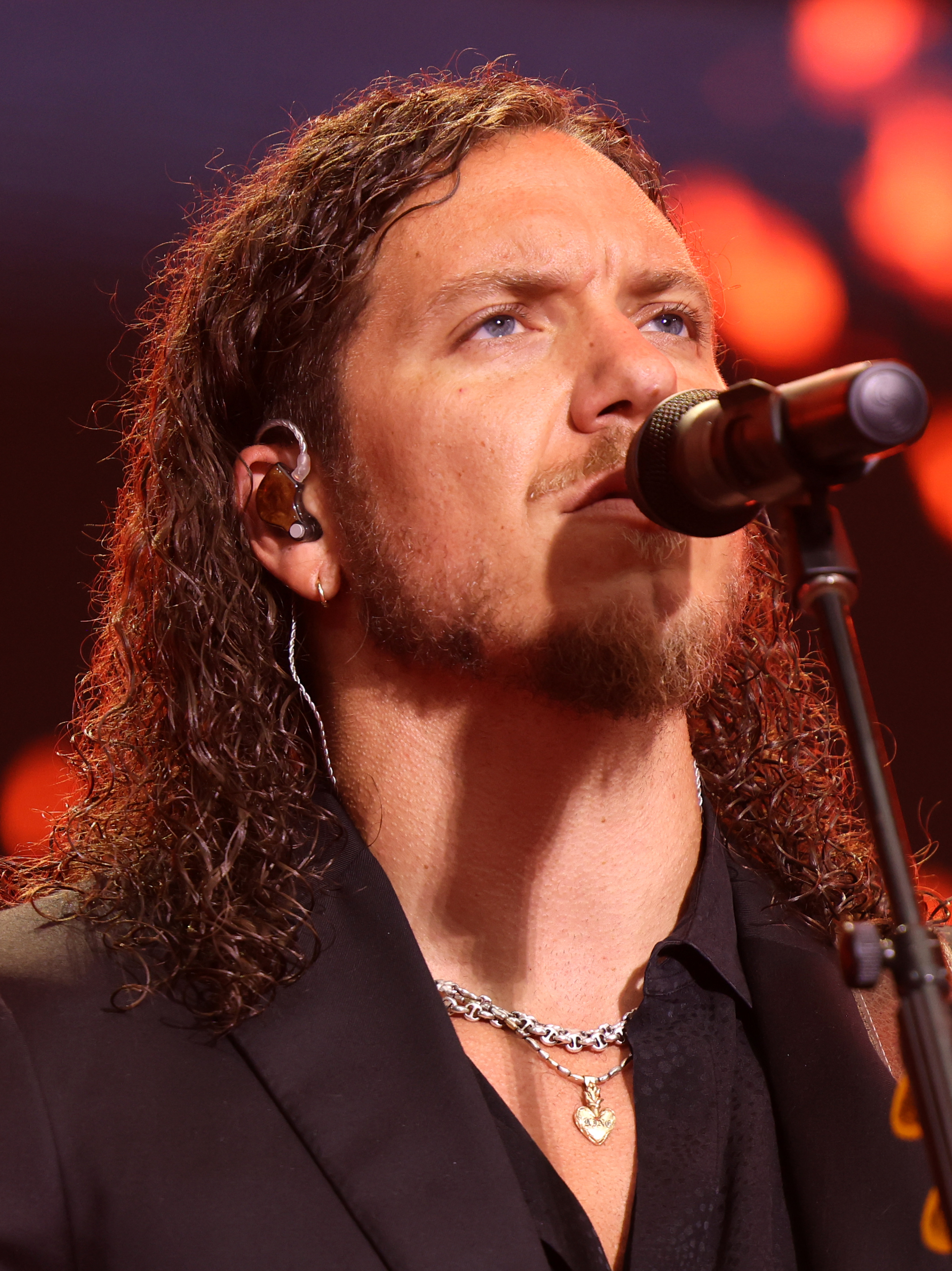
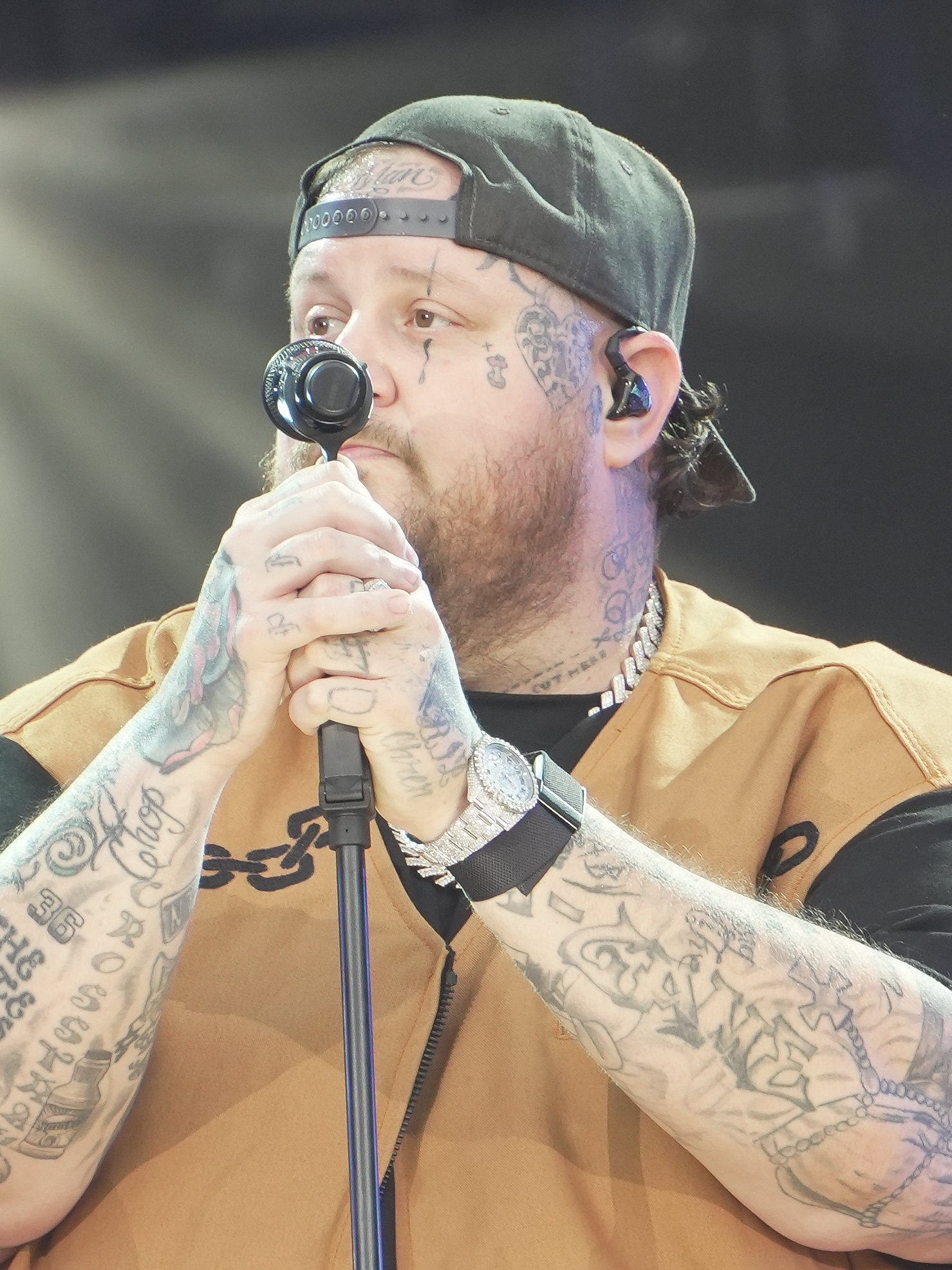
- "Hard Fought Hallelujah" by Brandon Lake with Jelly Roll is the most recent recipient
- Awarded for: quality vocal or instrumental contemporary Christian music recordings and songwriting
- Country: United States
- Presented by: National Academy of Recording Arts and Sciences
- First award: 2015
- Currently held by: Chris Brown, Steven Furtick, Benjamin William Hastings, Jason Bradley Deford & Brandon Lake – "Hard Fought Hallelujah" (2026)
- Website: grammy.com

The Grammy Award for Best Contemporary Christian Music Performance/Song is a category at the annual Grammy Awards. It was first awarded in 2015. It combined two previously separate categories in the Gospel/Contemporary Christian Music field, Best Contemporary Christian Music Song and Best Gospel/Contemporary Christian Music Performance. The new category recognizes both songwriters and performers (solo/duos/groups/collaborations/etc.) and is open for singles or tracks only. Songwriters are only awarded a Grammy Award if it is a newly written song. Grammy's for cover versions of previously recorded songs are awarded to the performer(s) only.

Along with the Best Gospel Performance/Song category, these mark the only Grammy categories which honor both performers and songwriters in one category.

These changes were made in June 2014 by the National Academy of Recording Arts and Sciences "in the interest of clarifying the criteria, representing the current culture and creative DNA of the gospel and Contemporary Christian Music communities, and better reflecting the diversity and authenticity of today's gospel music industry."

According to the Grammy committee, the move recognizes "the critical contribution of both songwriters and performers by combining songwriters and artists into the Best Gospel Performance/Song and Best Contemporary Christian Music Performance/Song categories."

Gospel performances which were previously recognized in the Best Gospel/Contemporary Christian Music Performance category, are now included in the Best Gospel Performance/Song category.

== Recipients ==
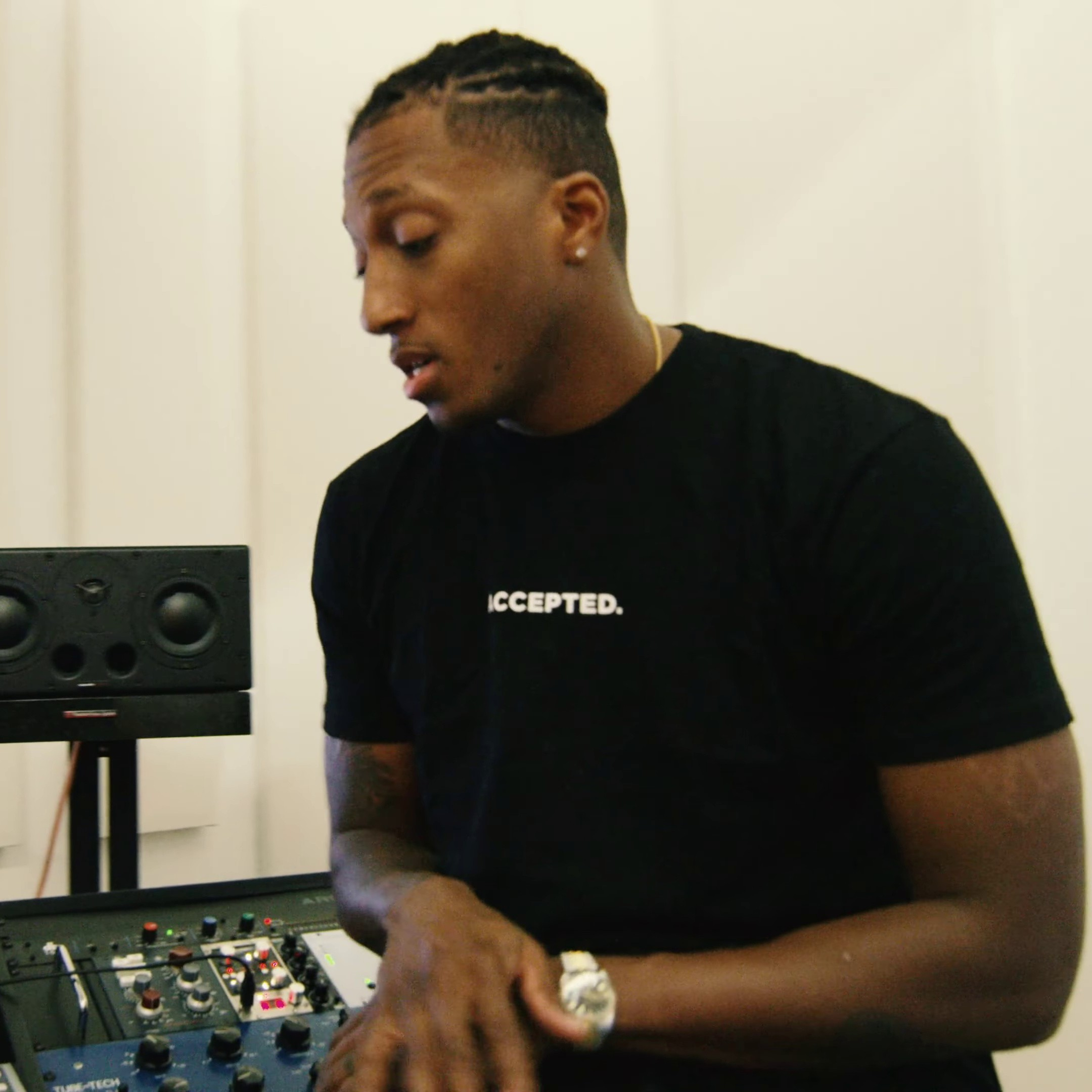
2015 winner Lecrae.

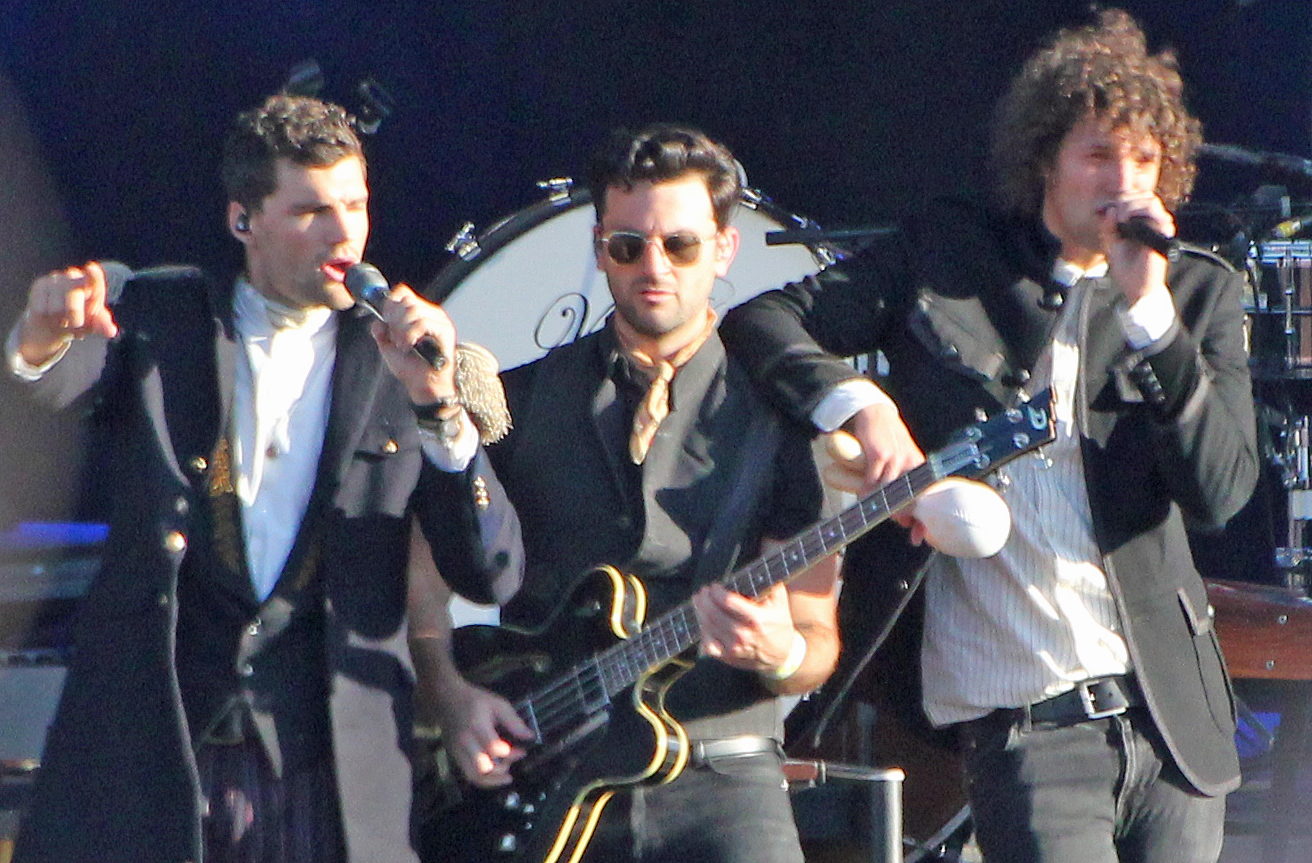
Two-time winners for KING & COUNTRY.

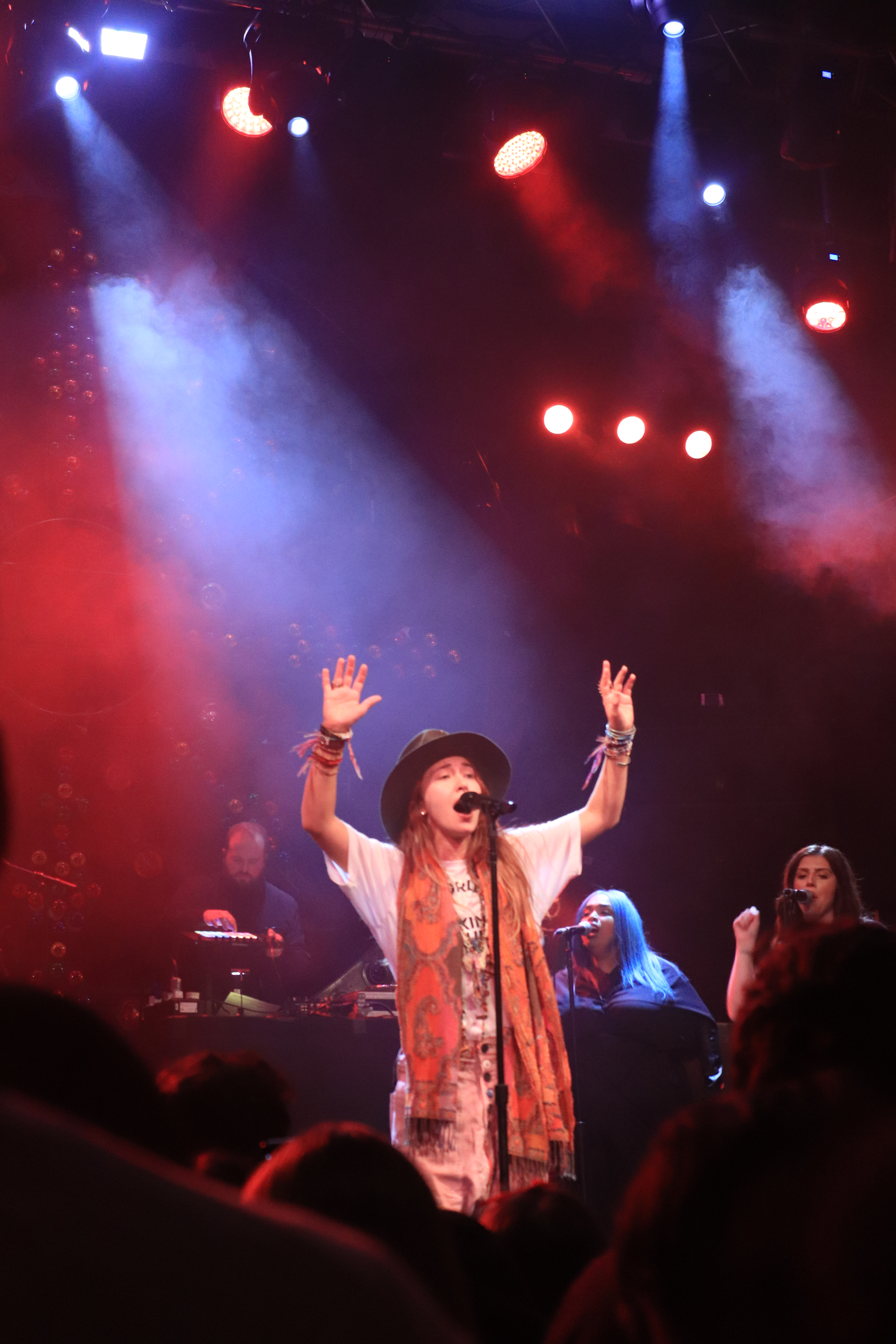
2019 winner Lauren Daigle.

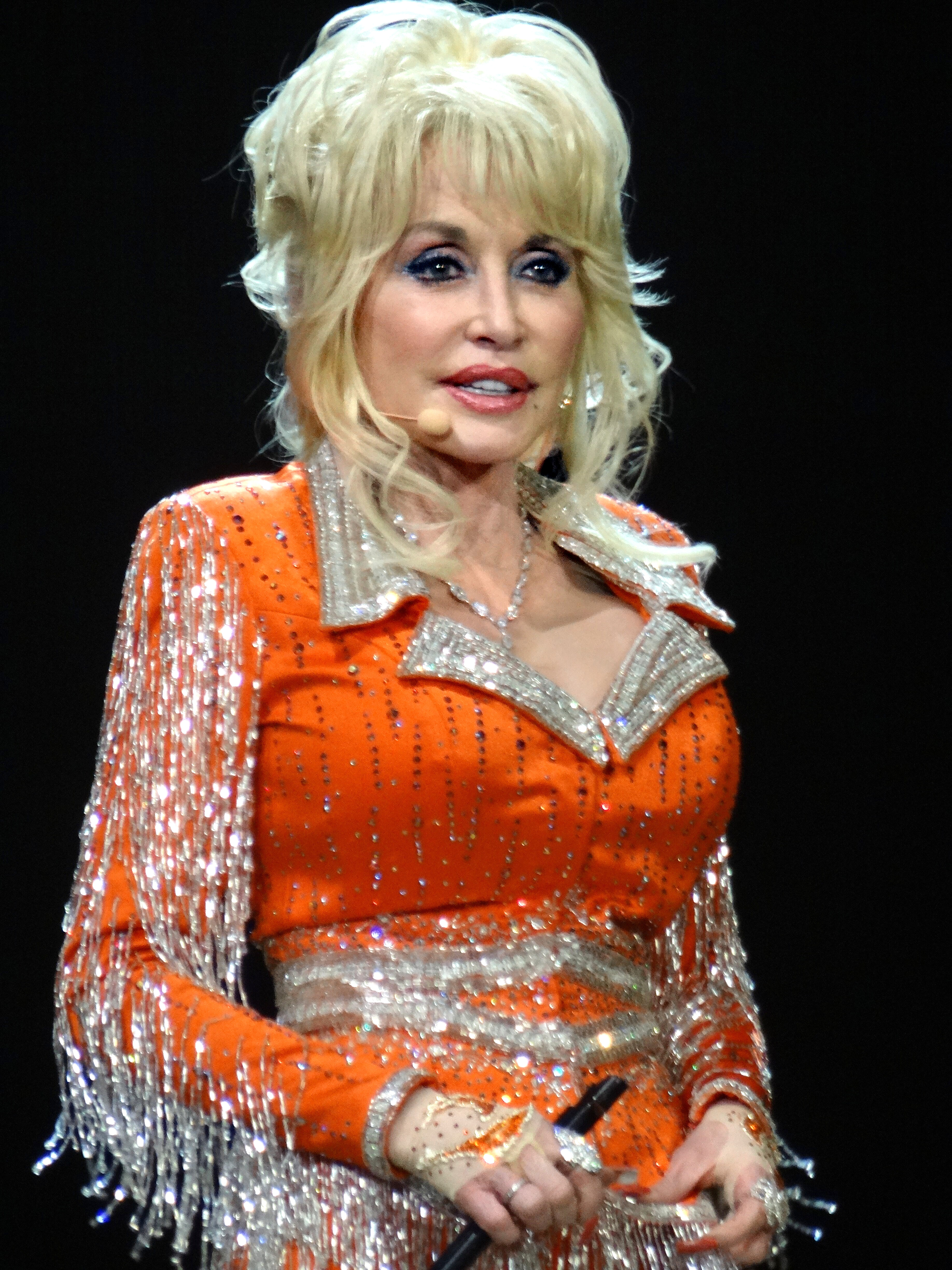
Two-time winner Dolly Parton.

=== 2010s ===
Year^{[I]}	Song	Songwriter(s)	Artist(s)
2015
2015	"Messengers"	Torrance Esmond, Ran Jackson, Ricky Jackson, Kenneth Chris Mackey, Lecrae Moore, Joseph Prielozny, Joel Smallbone and Luke Smallbone	Lecrae featuring For King & Country
2015	"Come as You Are"	David Crowder, Ben Glover and Matt Maher	Crowder
2015	"Multiplied"	Bear Rinehart and Bo Rinehart	Needtobreathe
2015	"Shake"	Nathan Cochran, David Arthur Garcia, Ben Glover, Barry Graul, Bart Millard, Soli Olds, Mike Scheuchzer and Robby Shaffer	MercyMe
2015	"Write Your Story"	Francesca Battistelli, David Arthur Garcia and Ben Glover	Francesca Battistelli
2016
2016	"Holy Spirit"	—N/a	Francesca Battistelli
2016	"Because He Lives (Amen)"	Matt Maher	Matt Maher
2016	"Feel It"	Cary Barlowe, David Garcia and Toby McKeehan	TobyMac featuring Mr. Talkbox
2016	"Lift Your Head Weary Sinner (Chains)"	Ed Cash, David Crowder and Seth Philpott	Crowder
2016	"Soul on Fire"	Tai Anderson, Brenton Brown, David Carr, Mark Lee, Matt Maher and Mac Powell	Third Day featuring All Sons & Daughters
2017
2017	"Thy Will"	Hillary Scott, Bernie Herms and Emily Weisband	Hillary Scott and the Scott Family
2017	"Chain Breaker"	Mia Fieldes, Jonathan Smith and Zach Williams	Zach Williams
2017	"King of the World"	Natalie Grant, Becca Mizell and Samuel Mizell	Natalie Grant
2017	"Priceless"	Benjamin Backus, Seth Mosley, Joel Smallbone, Luke Smallbone and Ted Tjornhom	For King & Country
2017	"Trust in You"	Lauren Daigle, Michael Farren and Paul Mabury	Lauren Daigle
2018
2018	"What a Beautiful Name"	Ben Fielding and Brooke Ligertwood	Hillsong Worship
2018	"Clean"	Natalie Grant	Natalie Grant
2018	"Even If"	David Garcia, Ben Glover, Crystal Lewis, MercyMe and Tim Timmons	MercyMe
2018	"Hills and Valleys"	Chuck Butler, Jonathan Smith and Tauren Wells	Tauren Wells
2018	"Oh My Soul"	Mark Hall, Bernie Herms and Nichole Nordeman	Casting Crowns
2019
2019	"You Say"	Lauren Daigle, Jason Ingram and Paul Mabury	Lauren Daigle
2019	"Grace Got You"	David Garcia, Ben Glover, MercyMe, Solomon Olds & John Reuben	MercyMe featuring John Reuben
2019	"Joy"	Ben Glover, Matt Hales, Stephen Blake Kanicka, Seth Mosley, Joel Smallbone, Luke Smallbone and Tedd Tjornhom	For King & Country
2019	"Known"	Ethan Hulse, Jordan Sapp and Tauren Wells	Tauren Wells
2019	"Reckless Love"	Cory Asbury, Caleb Culver and Ran Jackson	Cory Asbury

=== 2020s ===
Year^{[I]}	Song	Songwriter(s)	Artist(s)
2020
2020	"God Only Knows"	Josh Kerr, Jordan Reynolds, Joel Smallbone, Luke Smallbone and Tedd Tjornhom	For King & Country and Dolly Parton
2020	"God's Not Done with You" (Single Version)	Tauren Wells, Bernie Herms and Emily Weisband	Tauren Wells
2020	"Haven't Seen It Yet"	Danny Gokey, Ethan Hulse and Colby Wedgeworth	Danny Gokey
2020	"Only Jesus"	Mark Hall, Bernie Herms and Matthew West	Casting Crowns
2020	"Rescue Story"	Ethan Hulse, Andrew Ripp, Jonathan Smith and Zach Williams	Zach Williams
2021
2021	"There Was Jesus"	Casey Beathard, Jonathan Smith, Zach Williams and Dolly Parton	Zach Williams and Dolly Parton
2021	"The Blessing" (Live)	Chris Brown, Cody Carnes, Kari Jobe Carnes and Steven Furtick	Kari Jobe, Cody Carnes and Elevation Worship
2021	"Famous For (I Believe)"	Chuck Butler, Krissy Nordhoff, Jordan Sapp, Alexis Slifer and Tauren Wells	Tauren Wells featuring Jenn Johnson
2021	"Holy Water"	Andrew Bergthold, Ed Cash, Franni Cash, Martin Cash and Scott Cash	We the Kingdom
2021	"Sunday Morning"	Denisia Andrews, Jones Terrence Antonio, Saint Bodhi, Brittany Coney, Kirk Franklin, Lasanna Harris, Shama Joseph, Stuart Lowery, Lecrae Moore and Nathanael Saint-Fleur	Lecrae featuring Kirk Franklin
2022
2022	"Believe for It"	Dwan Hill, Kyle Lee, CeCe Winans and Mitch Wong	CeCe Winans
2022	"Hold Us Together" (Hope Mix)	Josiah Bassey, Dernst Emile II and H.E.R.	H.E.R. and Tauren Wells
2022	"Jireh"	Chris Brown, Steven Furtick, Chandler Moore and Naomi Raine	Elevation Worship and Maverick City Music featuring Chandler Moore and Naomi Raine
2022	"Man of Your Word"	Tony Brown, Jonathan Jay, Nathan Jess and Chandler Moore	Maverick City Music featuring Chandler Moore and KJ Scriven
2022	"We Win"	Kirk Franklin, Dominque Jones, Cynthia Nunn and Justin Smith	Kirk Franklin and Lil Baby
2023
2023	"Fear Is Not My Future"	Kirk Franklin, Nicole Hannel, Jonathan Jay, Brandon Lake and Hannah Shackelford	Maverick City Music and Kirk Franklin
2023	"For God Is with Us"	Josh Kerr, Jordan Reynolds, Joel Smallbone and Luke Smallbone	For King & Country and Hillary Scott
2023	"God Really Loves Us" (Radio Version)	Dante Bowe, David Crowder, Ben Glover and Jeff Sojka	Crowder featuring Dante Bowe and Maverick City Music
2023	"Holy Forever"	Jason Ingram, Brian Johnson, Jenn Johnson, Chris Tomlin and Phil Wickham	Chris Tomlin
2023	"Hymn of Heaven" (Radio Version)	Chris Davenport, Bill Johnson, Brian Johnson and Phil Wickham	Phil Wickham
2023	"So Good"	Chuck Butler, Dominique Jones and Ethan Hulse	DOE
2024
2024	"Your Power"	Alexandria Dollar, Jordan Dollar, Antonio Gardener, Micheal Girgenti, Lasanna "Ace" Harris, David Hein, Deandre Hunter, Dylan Hyde, Christian Louisana, Patrick Darius Mix Jr., Lecrae Moore, Christian Louisana, Justin Pelham, Jeffrey Lawrence Shannon and Allen Swoope	Lecrae and Tasha Cobbs Leonard
2024	"Believe"	Hank Bentley and Blessing Offor	Blessing Offor
2024	"Firm Foundation (He Won't)" (Live)	—N/a	Cody Carnes
2024	"God Problems"	Daniel Bashta, Chris Davenport, Ryan Ellis and Naomi Raine	Maverick City Music, Chandler Moore and Naomi Raine
2024	"Love Me Like I Am"	—N/a	for KING & COUNTRY ft. Jordin Sparks
2024	"Thank God I Do"	Lauren Daigle and Jason Ingram	Lauren Daigle
2025
2025	"That's My King"	Taylor Agan, Kellie Gamble, Lloyd Nicks and Jess Russ	CeCe Winans
2025	"Firm Foundation (He Won't)"	—N/a	Honor & Glory featuring Disciple
2025	"Holy Forever" (Live)	—N/a	Bethel Music, CeCe Winans and Jenn Johnson
2025	"In the Name of Jesus"	Austin Armstrong, Ran Jackson, Chandler Moore, Sajan Nauriyal, Ella Schnacky, Noah Schnacky and Ilya Toshinskiy	JWLKRS Worship and Maverick City Music featuring Chandler Moore
2025	"In the Room"	G. Morris Coleman, Tasha Cobbs Leonard and Naomi Raine	Maverick City Music, Naomi Raine and Chandler Moore featuring Tasha Cobbs Leonard
2025	"Praise"	Pat Barrett, Chris Brown, Cody Carnes, Steven Furtick, Brandon Lake and Chandler Moore	Elevation Worship featuring Brandon Lake, Chris Brown and Chandler Moore
2026
2026	"Hard Fought Hallelujah"	Chris Brown, Steven Furtick, Benjamin William Hastings, Jason Bradley Deford and Brandon Lake	Brandon Lake with Jelly Roll
2026	"Amazing"	PJ Morton and Darrel Walls	Darrel Walls and PJ Morton
2026	"Headphones"	Tyshane Thompson, BongoByTheWay, Michael Render, Lecrae Moore and Clifford Harris	Lecrae, Killer Mike and T.I.
2026	"I Know a Name"	Hank Bentley, Steven Furtick, Brandon Lake and Jacob Sooter	Elevation Worship, Chris Brown and Brandon Lake
2026	"Your Way's Better"	Forrest Frank and PERA	Forrest Frank
2027
2027	"Ale-luya Medley"	Kevin Camp, Nate Diaz, Israel Houghton, Angel Omar Martinez and Aaron Moses	Israel & New Breed
2027	"God I'm Just Grateful"	Joshua Emanuel Coleman, Pat Barrett, Steven Furtick, Chandler Moore and Abubakar Baker Shariff-Farr	Elevation Worship featuring Chandler Moore
2027	"The Jesus I Know Now"	Luke Laird, Brandon Lake, Emily Weisband and Lainey Wilson	Brandon Lake and Lainey Wilson
2027	"Left It in the River"	Jonathan Gamble, Jamie MacDonald and Colby Wedgeworth	Jamie MacDonald
2027	"Living Water"	Miles Corayer, Jonah Glass, Lasanna Harris, Andrew "Lihtz" Howard, Lecrae Moore, Joel McNeill and John McNeill	Lecrae
2027	"Worthy of It All (Worthy)"	—N/a	CeCe Winans

== See also ==
- Grammy Award for Best Gospel Song
- Grammy Award for Best Contemporary Christian Music Song
- Grammy Award for Best Gospel Performance/Song
- Grammy Award for Song of the Year
