= Samuel Robles =

Samuel Robles (Panamanian Musician)
- Born: 1974 (age 51–52); Panama, Panama
- Genres: Classical
- Occupations: Composer, Conductor, Educator
- Instruments: Percussion, Accordion
- Years active: 1988–present
- Label: The Recording Consort
- Website: www.samuelrobles.com

Samuel Robles (born 1974) is a Panamanian conductor, composer, and writer. His compositions are often influenced by Panamanian folklore and traditions, as evidenced from his earliest works (Dos Piezas para Flauta Sola, Mesano for saxophone quartet) to his most recent ones (Veraguas for orchestra, Canto for violin and string orchestra). His works have been performed by orchestras and soloists throughout the Americas, Europe and South Africa, most notably the OSJEV, the National Symphony of Panama, clarinetists Ana Catalina Ramírez, Carmen Borregales, Marco Antonio Mazzino, Alexis Fong and Matthew Jansen Giraldo, violinist Eddy Marcano, Eighth Blackbird's Michael Maccaferri, soprano Melissa Gerber, percussionists Stuart Gerber, Carlos Camacho and Jon Bisesi, mezzo Paulina Villarreal, among others. He has served as resident and featured composer in international festivals, including the Forum for Caribbean Composers and the JOCCA Festival.

== Career ==
He has been guest conductor with the Youth Orchestra of Bahia, the Orquesta Sinfónica Juvenil del Estado de Veracruz (OSJEV), the Orquesta Sinfónica Juvenil de Orizaba, the José Artigas National Symphony of Uruguay, the Bahia Symphony Orchestra, the YOA Camerata, and the Joven Orquesta y Coro de Centroamérica (JOCCA), among others. He served for seven years as the music director for the Orquesta Sinfónica Juvenil Istmeña in his native Panama (2003–2010) and has held positions at the Universidad Católica Santa María La Antigua, National Institute of Culture of Panama and the National Concert Association of Panama. He has worked with soloists such as singers Anna Noggle and Ryland Angel, Eddy Marcano, Tracy Wu, and Miguel Ángel Cegarra. He has been called a "wonderfully engaging conductor" by Boston Philharmonic's Benjamin Zander.

As a fiction writer, Robles has been awarded several prizes for his short stories and poetry, and has been published by the National Institute of Culture of Panamá, Fundación Signos, and El Duende Gramático.

Samuel Robles holds degrees from the Universidad Católica Santa María La Antigua, the College-Conservatory of Music at the University of Cincinnati, the University of Chicago, and North-West University (South Africa). He began music studies at 10, and has been a pupil of Hannes Taljaard, Ricardo Zohn-Muldoon, Allen Otte, Joel Hoffman, Rodney Winther, Aristides "Tille" Valderrama, and Dino Nugent. He has taught at Florida State University - Panama, Balboa Academy, and The International School of Panama.

== Compositions ==
Robles' early work is heavily influenced by the music of the early 20th century, particularly by Edgard Varèse and Anton Webern. This is audible in his Dos Piezas para Flauta Sola (1996), el cristo llora lágrimas de sangre (1999) for voice and ensemble and amanecer en tiempos de guerra for orchestra (1999). In the latter, commissioned by the National Symphony of Panama and dedicated "to the Panamanian victims of invasion of December 1989", Robles presents angular motives which slowly develop melodically over quartal harmonies.

Later works show clearer influences from Panamanian traditional music and poetry, and a turn to symmetrical harmonic constructions, although still in fourths and seconds. In Coplas (2010), Robles explores the tradition of improvised sung couplets (Four-verse strophes with rhyme scheme ABAB, or ABCB). Anonymous verses are juxtaposed with a piano accompaniment which recalls the 'torrentes' (harmonic and rhythmic patterns from the mejorana tradition of Panama). The use of Panamanian drumming patterns from 'tamborito' music are also a staple of Robles' work. Zafra (2009), for orchestra, is one instance of such use of traditional rhythms. The piece's tempo marking 'Atravesao' is frequently used by Robles, and refers to the 6/8 - 3/4 drumming pattern. The same rhythmic scheme and tempo marking is used in the second of the Dos Miniaturas (originally for flute and piano, also for violin and piano). The first movement, 'En Tiempo de Punto' recalls the colorful couple folk dance of the same name.

There are a handful of tonal works in Robles' catalog, most of which are impressions of Panamanian music genres. His Suite Panameña (2009) is composed of three movements, depicting three styles of folk song and dance: Punto, Mejorana, Atravesao. Another example of this is Lamento y Punto (2009), which calls upon both the mejorana tradition, and the intimate couple dance form.

Works for Unaccompanied Instruments A considerable portion of Robles' catalog consists of works for solo instruments; they are also his most widely performed. Among his earliest examples are Fuego en el Bosque for clarinet and Dos Piezas for flute. More recent pieces in this category include Fantasía and Cabangueando, both for clarinet, and the Piano Sonata, a posthumous homage to Panamanian Composer Roque Cordero. His ballet for a single percussionist Tian-Ho, based on a Chinese folk legend, was performed at the Tanglewood Festival in 2000 by percussionist Jonathan Bisesi and dancer Meghan Brennan.

== Writing ==
His interest in writing began concurrently with his first studies in music. His first poetry book, Danza de Espumas, obtained the Signos National Prize in 1991, and was published the same year by the National Institute of Culture of Panama. In the same competition, Robles obtained mention of honor in the Short Story category. A number of his short stories have been published in Panamanian periodicals and in the Maga literary journal. Robles was named one of the "50 under 50" most notable short story writers by Fundación Signos, and as such his El Rescate y la Muerte de Tristán was included in the anthology Hasta el Sol de Mañana, published by the Foundation. His most recent poetry book, ...como vino de palma is being released by Ediciones El Duende Gramático.

Robles' poetry is brief, direct, and filled with landscape images and frequently using nature as a metaphor for human emotion. The evocation of his homeland and its traditions is as frequent in his poetry and stories as in his music.

== Popular music ==
As accordionist, percussionist and keyboardist, Robles has collaborated in music performances and recordings of popular and folk music. He has recorded with jazz composer and saxophonist Luis Carlos Pérez, singer/songwriter Gonzalo Horna, and singer Cheli. He plays keyboards and accordion for Panamanian rock band Los Guayas.
