= Namoli Brennet =

American singer-songwriter (born 1970)

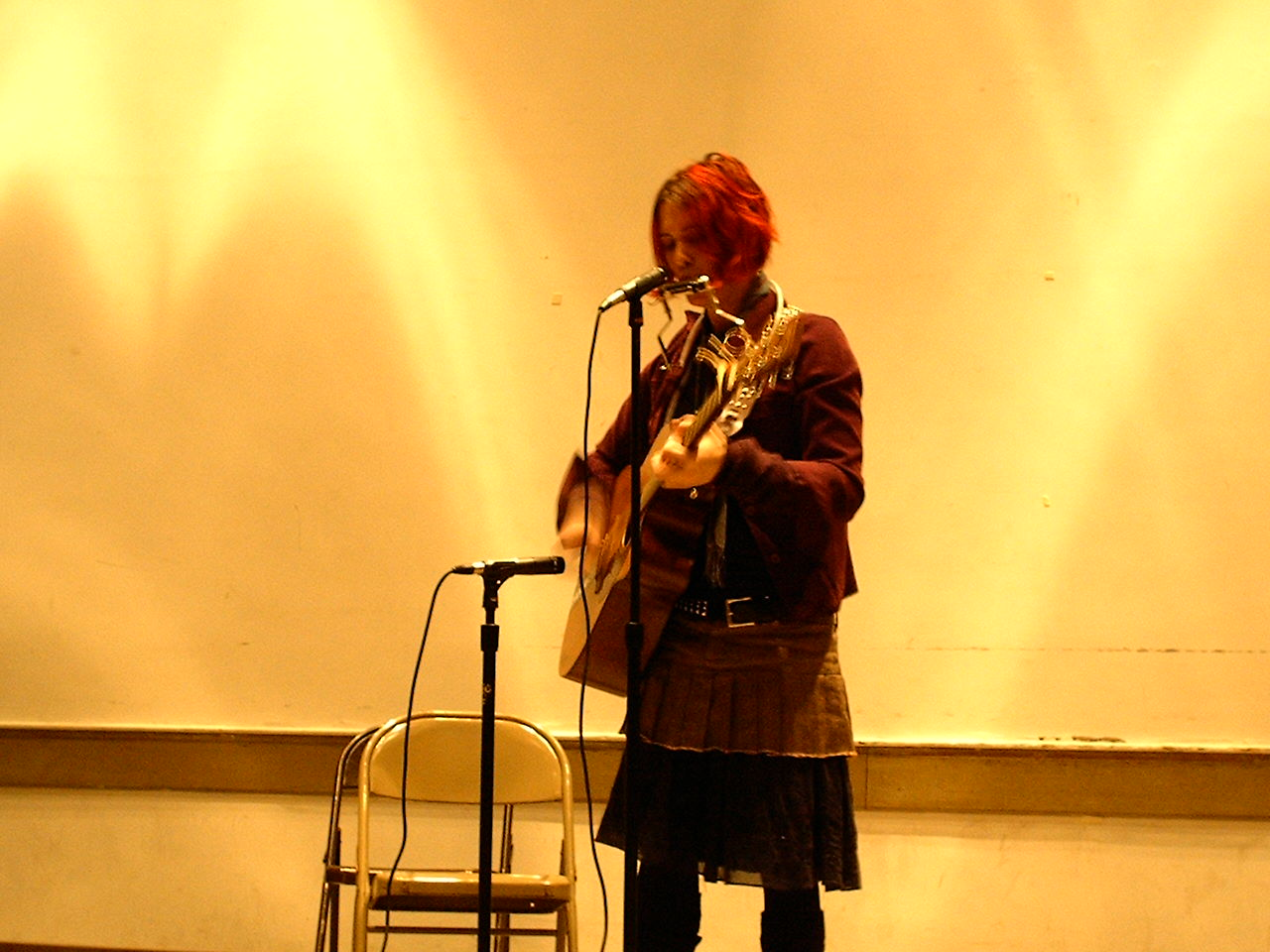
- Brennet performing at the Frick Fine Arts Building in 2007

Background information
- Born: February 27, 1970 (age 56)
- Genres: indie; folk rock; acoustic
- Occupations: Musician; singer-songwriter
- Instruments: Vocals; guitar; harmonica; piano; mandolin; banjo; bass; drums
- Years active: 2002–present
- Labels: Flaming Dame Records; Girl's Gotta Eat Records

Namoli Brennet (born February 27, 1970) is a singer-songwriter who has been touring the United States since the release of her first album in 2002.

Brennet produces, engineers and releases her albums on her own record label, Flaming Dame Records. Her music has been featured on NPR, PBS, and the Emmy-award winning documentary, Out in the Silence, which details the struggle of a gay teen growing up in rural Pennsylvania. Brennet has received four nominations for OUTmusic awards and was the recipient of a Tucson Folk Festival Songwriting Award. Brennet has shared stages with Melissa Ferrick, Jill Sobule, Alix Olson, and Girlyman.

Since 2013, she has lived in Decorah, Iowa. Brennet toured Europe in June 2014, following the release of her latest album Ditch Lilies. In 2014, she began performing in Germany with the Namoli Brennet Trio which consists of herself as vocalist and guitarist, bassist Amy Zapf, and drummer Micha Maass. They first performed at The Blue Wave Festival in 2014 and toured in the spring of 2015.

== Early life ==
Brennet was born in Connecticut on February 27, 1970. She is a transgender woman, having been assigned male at birth. She was a Connecticut native before moving to Tucson, Arizona, where she lived for ten years.

== Discography ==
=== Studio albums ===
- Boy in a Dress (2002)
- Welcome to the Afterglow (2003)
- The Brighter Side of Me (2004)
- Chrysanthemum (2005)
- Singer Shine Your Light (2007)
- Until from This Dream I Wake (2009)
- Black Crow (2010)
- We Were Born to Rise (2011)
- Ditch Lilies (2015)
- The Simple Life (2018)
- Light It Up (2020)
- The Poet Tree (2023)
- The Speed of Nature (2024)
- Moving Pictures (2026)

=== Live albums ===
- Alive (2006)
- Namoli Brennet Live (2012)
