= Aaron Cole =

American Christian rapper and singer

- Also known as: Aaron Cole
- Born: Aaron Tyrese Cole; February 28, 1999 (age 27); Bristol, Virginia
- Origin: Nashville, Tennessee, U.S.
- Genre: Christian hip hop
- Occupations: Rapper, songwriter
- Instrument: Vocals
- Years active: 2003–present
- Label: Gotee
- Website: iamaaroncole.com

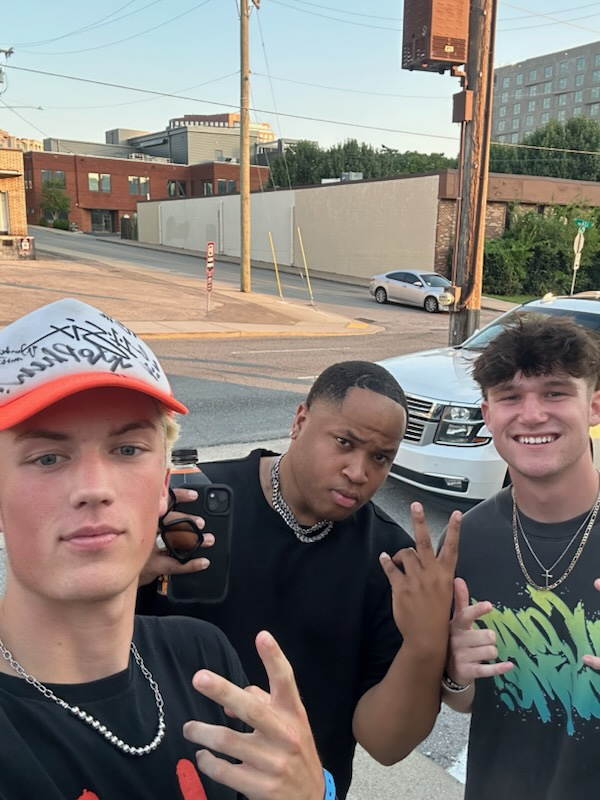
Aaron Cole (center) poses with fans at Holy Smoke! 2025. Nashville, TN.

Aaron Tyrese Cole (born February 28, 1999) is an American Christian rapper, singer and songwriter. He began his career at the age of four. He signed to Gotee Records, a record label founded by Christian hip hop performer Toby McKeehan. Cole is known the best for his songs "Right on Time", "One More Day" and "Like You".

== Early and personal life ==
Cole was raised in a musical family, where his father had his own recording studio in their apartment. Around the time of his high school years, Cole discovered that music was his true vocation, and he wanted to become a professional rapper. "I remember in junior high just enjoying being a regular kid, but I would get picked on because I wasn't smoking, drinking, or getting in trouble," says Cole. "One afternoon I came home and told my dad what was going on and why, and he shared that he thought I was called for a purpose and that this calling would cost me to not be like everyone else. It was that moment that I encountered God for the first time for myself, and I knew I was born to do this and began writing and putting my own songs together." Cole currently resides in Bristol, VA.

== Music career ==
Cole began his career at the age of four. One day, his father wrote him a song called "Jesus is the Rock". It was also the title of his first CD, released in July 2003. Throughout his career he bridged the gap between rapping and singing. He has since released a total of six independent projects. He has featured on songs by Hollyn and DJ Maj. In 2016, Cole was inducted into Christian Hip Hop's top media outlet Rapzilla's Freshman Class and noted by Essence Magazine as one of 16 gospel artists to watch. Cole signed to Gotee Records in 2017.

== Discography ==
=== Albums ===
- Jesus Is the Rock (2003)
- 4th Period (2012)
- Not By Chance (2019)
- Two Up Two Down (2021)
- Sorry, I Changed (2024)

=== EPs ===
- Fifteen Is the New XV (2014)
- If I Can Be Honest (2016)
- Virginia Boy (2018)
- The Other Side (2018)
- AOTY (2020)
- Only U Forever (2020)
- 4 (2020)
- Signing Bonus (2024)
- Omari (2024)
- Where Do We Go From Here? (2025)

=== Singles ===
Year	Single	Chart positions		Album
Year	Single	US Christ	US Christ Air.	Album
2014	"15"	—	—	Fifteen is the New XV
2017	"Facts"	—	—	Non-album singles
2017	"Y.C.H.M.B."	—	—	Non-album singles
2017	"Right on Time" (featuring TobyMac)	28	27	Non-album singles
2017	"Time Square"	—	—	Non-album singles
2018	"One More Day"	34	22	Virginia Boy
2018	"Off My Back"	—	—	Cole Season (Playlist)
2018	"Motions"	—	—	Cole Season (Playlist)
2018	"Down Like That" (featuring Koryn Hawthorne)	—	—	Cole Season (Playlist)
2018	"Yo Handz" (featuring Caleb Cruise)	—	—	Cole Season (Playlist)
2018	"Exclusive"	—	—	Cole Season (Playlist)
2018	"Promised Land"	—	—	Cole Season (Playlist)
2018	"Mama Said"	—	—	Cole Season (Playlist)
2018	"Making History"	—	—	Cole Season (Playlist)
2018	"Patient With Me"	—	—	Cole Season (Playlist)
2018	"Greed Money Power" (featuring Derek Minor and Beleaf)	—	—	Cole Season (Playlist)
2019	"Fasho"	—	—	Not By Chance
2019	"There for Me"	—	—	Not By Chance
2020	"Only U" (with Terrian)	—	—	Two Up Two Down
2021	"Like You" (with Tauren Wells and TobyMac)	—	—	Two Up Two Down
2021	"Miracle"	—	—	Two Up Two Down
2021	"Above Me" (featuring Parris Chariz)	—	—	Two Up Two Down
2021	"Leave Me" (featuring J. Moss)	—	—	Two Up Two Down
2021	"Front Row"	—	—	Two Up Two Down
2026	"Usher in the Spirit"	— (Note: "Usher in the Spirit" did not enter the Billboard Hot Christian Songs chart, but peaked at number 9 on the Hot Gospel Songs chart.)	—	Non-album single
"—" denotes a recording that did not chart or was not released in that territory.

=== Other charted songs ===
Year	Single	Chart positions	Album
Year	Single	US Christ	Album
2018	"Starts With Me" (with TobyMac)	36	The Elements

== Awards ==
=== GMA Dove Awards ===
Year	Nominee / work	Award	Result
2019	Aaron Cole	New Artist of the Year	Won
2020	Not By Chance	Rap/Hip Hop Album of the Year	Nominated
2022	"Above Me" (featuring Parris Chariz)	Rap/Hip Hop Recorded Song of the Year	Nominated
2022	Two Up Two Down	Rap/Hip Hop Album of the Year	Nominated
