= Emily Weisband =

American country music singer and songwriter

- Born: Fredericksburg, Virginia, U.S.
- Origin: Nashville, Tennessee, U.S.
- Genres: Country, pop
- Occupations: Singer, songwriter
- Instrument: Vocals
- Years active: 2014-present
- Label: Warner
- Publisher: THIS Music

Emily Weisband is an American country music singer and songwriter. She has written singles for BTS, Halsey, Camila Cabello, Charlotte Cardin, and Hillary Scott. She has also released three extended plays via Warner Records, and has charted one single on Billboard Country Airplay.

== Biography ==
Emily Weisband was born and raised in Fredericksburg, Virginia. She is the oldest of six children. She began playing guitar and writing songs as a teenager, and founded a local band called Wild at Heart. After graduating high school, she moved to Nashville, Tennessee, to attend Belmont University. After graduating with a major in songwriting, she signed with the song publishing company THIS Music, which is a division of Warner Chappell Music. The contract was made possible due to an internship with the university. After signing her contract, she began writing songs which ended up recorded a number of other singers, including Pink and Keith Urban. Additionally, Drew Baldridge featured her on his 2016 single "Rebound", which charted on Billboard Country Airplay.

In 2016, she co-wrote "Thy Will", a song recorded by Lady Antebellum vocalist Hillary Scott along with her sister Rylee and parents, Linda Davis and Lang Scott. Weisband and Scott wrote the song with Bernie Herms. The song won Weisband a Grammy Award for Best Contemporary Christian Music Performance/Song. Other songs written by Weisband include "Boy with Luv" by BTS and Halsey and "Consequences" by Camila Cabello.

Due to the success of "Thy Will", Weisband began a singing career. In 2019, Weisband released a seven-song extended play titled Identity Crisis via Warner Records. The album's title track was released as a single, while the track "Naked" received a music video. This was followed by Not Afraid to Say Goodbye in 2020. A third EP, I Call It Being Human, followed in 2021. The track "New Salt" was issued as a single from this project.

== Personal life ==
In November 2022, Weisband married Dylan Toscano, a medical sales representative. Attendees of the wedding included Hillary Scott and Little Big Town member Karen Fairchild.

== Discography ==
=== Studio albums ===
- Identity Crisis (2019)
- Not Afraid to Say Goodbye (2020)
- I Call It Being Human (2021)

=== Other credits ===
- "No Survivors" by Jeremy Camp, credited as writer
- "The Jesus I Know Now" by Brandon Lake and Lainey Wilson, credited as writer
