= Record label =

Brand associated with music and music videos

"The Big Four" music labels

A record label or record company is a brand or trademark of music recordings and music videos, or the company that owns it. A record label can also be a publishing company that manages such brands and trademarks, coordinates the production, manufacture, distribution, marketing, promotion, and enforcement of copyright for sound recordings and music videos, while also conducting talent scouting and development of new artists, artist financing and maintaining contracts with recording artists and their managers. The term "record label" derives from the circular label in the center of a vinyl record which prominently displays the manufacturer's name, along with other information.

Within the mainstream music industry, recording artists have traditionally been reliant upon record labels to broaden their consumer base, market their albums, and promote their singles on streaming services, radio, and television. Record labels also provide publicists, who assist performers in gaining positive media coverage, and arrange for their merchandise to be available via stores and other media outlets.

== Major versus independent record labels ==
Record labels may be small, localized and "independent" ("indie"), or they may be part of a large international media group, or somewhere in between. The Association of Independent Music (AIM) defines a "major" as "a multinational company which (together with the companies in its group) has more than 5% of the world market(s) for the sale of records or music videos". As of 2026, only four labels are "major labels": Sony Music Group, Universal Music Group, Warner Music Group, and BMG Rights Management. In 2014, AIM estimated that the majors had a collective global market share of some 65–70%.

== Major labels ==
Major record labels are often under the control of a corporate umbrella organization called a "music group". A music group is usually affiliated to an international conglomerate "holding company", which often has non-music divisions as well. A music group controls and consists of music-publishing companies, record (sound recording) manufacturers, record distributors, and record labels. Record companies (manufacturers, distributors, and labels) may also constitute a "record group" which is, in turn, controlled by a music group. The constituent companies in a music group or record group are sometimes marketed as being "divisions" of the group.

=== Present major labels ===
Major record label	Date founded	Headquarters	Divisions	Global market share
Universal Music Group	September 1934; 92 years ago	Hilversum, North Holland, Netherlands (corporate); Santa Monica, California, United States (operational)	List of Universal Music Group labels	39.4%
Sony Music Group	August 1, 2019; 7 years ago	New York City, New York, United States	List of Sony Music labels	27.4%
Warner Music Group	October 1, 1958; 68 years ago	New York City, New York, United States	List of Warner Music Group labels	17.1%
BMG Rights Management	September 9, 2008; 18 years ago	Nashville, Tennessee, United States (corporate); Berlin, Germany (operational)	List of BMG labels	2.6%

From 1929 to 1998, there were six major record labels, known as the Big Six:

1. Warner Music Group
2. EMI
3. Sony Music (known as CBS Records until January 1988)
4. BMG (formed in 1985 as RCA/Ariola International)
5. Universal Music Group (known as MCA Records until 1996)
6. PolyGram

PolyGram was merged into Universal Music Group (UMG) in 1999, leaving the remaining record labels to be known as the Big Five.

In 2004, Sony and BMG agreed to a joint venture and merged their recorded music division to create the Sony BMG label (which would be renamed Sony Music Entertainment after a 2008 merger); BMG kept its music publishing division separate from Sony BMG and later sold BMG Music Publishing to UMG. In 2007, the remaining record labels—then known as the Big Four—controlled about 70% of the world music market, and about 80% of the United States music market.

In 2012, the major divisions of EMI were sold off separately by owner Citigroup: most of EMI's recorded music division was absorbed into UMG; EMI Music Publishing was absorbed into Sony/ATV Music Publishing; finally, EMI's Parlophone and Virgin Classics labels were absorbed into Warner Music Group (WMG) in July 2013. This left the so-called Big Three labels.

In 2020 and 2021, both UMG and WMG had their IPO with the latter starting trading at Nasdaq and the former starting trading at Euronext Amsterdam and leaving only Sony Music as wholly owned subsidiary of an international conglomerate (Sony Music Group which in turn is owned by Sony Group Corporation).

In 2026, BMG announced that the company would merge with Concord to create the fourth major music company in the world. The new firm was scheduled to operate under the BMG name, with Bertelsmann owning a 67% stake in the new company and the remainder owned by Great Mountain Partners. On June 12, 2026, the merger was approved by the German Federal Cartel Office. On June 17, 2026, the merger was approved by the US competition authorities and the merger was completed on September 1, 2026.

Today, there are 4 major record companies. 2 out of the 4 major record companies are related to Skydance, due to the Paramount acquisition of Warner Bros which caused CBS (the former owner of Sony Music) and Warner Bros. (the former owner of Warner Music Group) to become sister companies.

== Independent ==
Record labels and music publishers that are not under the control of the Big Four are generally considered to be independent (indie), even if they are large corporations with complex structures. The term indie label is sometimes used to refer to only those independent labels that adhere to independent criteria of corporate structure and size, and some consider an indie label to be almost any label that releases non-mainstream music, regardless of its corporate structure.

Independent labels are often considered more artist-friendly. Though they may have less sales power, indie labels typically offer larger artist royalty with a 50% profit-share agreement, aka 50–50 deal, not uncommon. In addition, independent labels are often artist-owned (although not always), with a stated intent often being to control the quality of the artist's output. Independent labels usually do not enjoy the resources available to the "big four" and as such will often lag behind them in market shares. However, frequently independent artists manage a return by recording for a much smaller production cost of a typical big label release. Sometimes they are able to recoup their initial advance even with much lower sales numbers.

On occasion, established artists, once their record contract has finished, move to an independent label. This often gives the combined advantage of name recognition and more control over one's music along with a larger portion of royalty profits. Artists such as Dolly Parton, Aimee Mann, Prince, Public Enemy, among others, have done this. Historically, companies started in this manner have been re-absorbed into the major labels (two examples are American singer Frank Sinatra's Reprise Records, which has been owned by Warner Music Group since 1963, and musician Herb Alpert's A&M Records, now owned by Universal Music Group). Similarly, Madonna's Maverick Records (started by Madonna with her manager and another partner) was to come under control of Warner Music when Madonna divested herself of controlling shares in the company.

Some independent labels become successful enough that major record companies negotiate contracts to either distribute music for the label or in some cases, purchase the label completely, to the point where it functions as an imprint or sublabel.

== Imprint ==
A label used as a trademark or brand and not a company is called an imprint, a term used for a similar concept in publishing. An imprint is often marketed as a "unit" or "division" of the parent label, though in most cases, they operate as pseudonym for it and do not exist as a distinct business operation or separate business structure (although trademarks are sometimes registered).

A record label may give a musical act an imprint as part of their branding, while other imprints serve to house other activities, such as side ventures of that label.

== Sublabel ==
Music collectors often use the term sublabel to refer to either an imprint or a subordinate label company (such as those within a group). For example, in the 1980s and 1990s, 4th & B'way Records (pronounced as "Broadway") was a trademarked brand owned by Island Records Ltd. in the UK and by a subordinate branch, Island Records, Inc., in the United States. The center label on a 4th & Broadway record marketed in the United States would typically bear a 4th & B'way logo and would state in the fine print, "4th & B'way™, an Island Records, Inc. company". Collectors discussing labels as brands would say that 4th & B'way is a sublabel or imprint of just "Island" or "Island Records". Similarly, collectors who choose to treat corporations and trademarks as equivalent might say 4th & B'way is an imprint and/or sublabel of both Island Records, Ltd. and that company's sublabel, Island Records, Inc. However, such definitions are complicated by the corporate mergers that occurred in 1989 (when Island was sold to PolyGram) and 1998 (when PolyGram merged with Universal). PolyGram held sublabels including Mercury, Island and Motown. Island remained registered as corporations in both the United States and UK, but control of its brands changed hands multiple times as new companies were formed, diminishing the corporation's distinction as the "parent" of any sublabels.

== Vanity labels ==
Vanity labels are labels that bear an imprint that gives the impression of an artist's ownership or control, but in fact represent a standard artist/label relationship. In such an arrangement, the artist will control nothing more than the usage of the name on the label, but may enjoy a greater say in the packaging of their work. An example of such a label is the Neutron label owned by ABC while at Phonogram Inc. in the UK. At one point artist Lizzie Tear (under contract with ABC themselves) appeared on the imprint, but it was devoted almost entirely to ABC's offerings and is still used for their re-releases (though Phonogram owns the masters of all the work issued on the label).

However, not all labels dedicated to particular artists are completely superficial in origin. Many artists, early in their careers, create their own labels which are later bought out by a bigger company. If this is the case it can sometimes give the artist greater freedom than if they were signed directly to the big label. There are many examples of this kind of label, such as Nothing Records, owned by Trent Reznor of Nine Inch Nails; and Morning Records, owned by the Cooper Temple Clause, who were releasing EPs for years before the company was bought by RCA.

== Relationship with artists ==
If an artist and a label want to work together, whether an artist has contacted a label directly, usually by sending their team a demo, or the Artists & Repertoire team of the label has scouted the artist and reached out directly, they will usually enter in to a contractual relationship.

A label typically enters into an exclusive recording contract with an artist to market the artist's recordings in return for royalties on the selling price of the recordings. Contracts may extend over short or long durations, and may or may not refer to specific recordings. Established, successful artists tend to be able to renegotiate their contracts to get terms more favorable to them, but Prince's much-publicized 1994–1996 feud with Warner Bros. Records provides a strong counterexample, as does Roger McGuinn's claim, made in July 2000 before a US Senate committee, that the Byrds never received any of the royalties they had been promised for their biggest hits, "Mr. Tambourine Man" and "Turn! Turn!, Turn!".

A contract either provides for the artist to deliver completed recordings to the label, or for the label to undertake the recording with the artist. For artists without a recording history, the label is often involved in selecting producers, recording studios, additional musicians, and songs to be recorded, and may supervise the output of recording sessions. For established artists, a label is usually less involved in the recording process.

The relationship between record labels and artists can be a difficult one. Many artists have had conflicts with their labels over the type of sound or songs they want to make, which can result in the artist's artwork or titles being changed before release. Other artists have had their music prevented from release, or shelved. Record labels generally do this because they believe that the album will sell better if the artist complies with the label's desired requests or changes. At times, the record label's decisions are prudent ones from a commercial perspective, but these decisions may frustrate artists who feel that their art is being diminished or misrepresented by such actions.

In other instances, record labels have shelved artists' albums with no intention of any promotion for the artist in question. Reasons for shelving can include the label deciding to focus its resources on other artists on its roster, or the label undergoing a restructure where the person that signed the artist and supports the artist's vision is no longer present to advocate for the artist. In extreme cases, record labels can prevent the release of an artist's music for years, while also declining to release the artist from their contract, leaving the artist in a state of limbo. Artists who have had disputes with their labels over ownership and control of their music have included Taylor Swift, Tinashe, Jon Bellion, Megan Thee Stallion, Kelly Clarkson, Thirty Seconds to Mars, Clipse, Ciara, JoJo, Michelle Branch, Kesha, Kanye West, Lupe Fiasco, Paul McCartney, and Johnny Cash.

In the early days of the recording industry, recording labels were absolutely necessary for the success of any artist. The first goal of any new artist or band was to get signed to a contract as soon as possible. In the 1940s, 1950s, and 1960s, many artists were so desperate to sign a contract with a record company that they sometimes ended up signing agreements in which they sold the rights to their recordings to the record label forever. Entertainment lawyers are usually employed by artists to discuss contract terms.

Due to advancing technology such as the Internet, the role of labels is rapidly changing, as artists are able to freely distribute their own material through online radio, peer-to-peer file sharing such as BitTorrent, and other services, at little to no cost, but with correspondingly low financial returns. Established artists, such as Nine Inch Nails, whose career was developed with major label backing, announced an end to their major label contracts, citing that the uncooperative nature of the recording industry with these new trends is hurting musicians, fans and the industry as a whole. However, Nine Inch Nails later returned to working with a major label, admitting that they needed the international marketing and promotional reach that a major label can provide. Radiohead also cited similar motives with the end of their contract with EMI when their album In Rainbows was released as a "pay what you want" sales model as an online download, but they also returned to a label for a conventional release. Research shows that record labels still control most access to distribution.

== New label strategies ==
Computers and internet technology led to an increase in file sharing and direct-to-fan digital distribution, causing music sales to plummet in recent years. Labels and organizations have had to change their strategies and the way they work with artists. New types of deals called "multiple rights" or "360" deals are being made with artists, where labels are given rights and percentages to artist's touring, merchandising, and endorsements. In exchange for these rights, labels usually give higher advance payments to artists, have more patience with artist development, and pay higher percentages of CD sales. These 360 deals are most effective when the artist is established and has a loyal fan base. For that reason, labels now have to be more relaxed with the development of artists because longevity is the key to these types of pact. Several artists such as Paramore, Maino, and even Madonna have signed such types of deals.

A look at an actual 360 deal offered by Atlantic Records to an artist shows a variation of the structure. Atlantic's document offers a conventional cash advance to sign the artist, who would receive a royalty for sales after expenses were recouped. With the release of the artist's first album, however, the label has an option to pay an additional $200,000 in exchange for 30 percent of the net income from all touring, merchandise, endorsements, and fan-club fees. Atlantic would also have the right to approve the act's tour schedule, and the salaries of certain tour and merchandise sales employees hired by the artist. In addition, the label also offers the artist a 30 percent cut of the label's album profits—if any—which represents an improvement from the typical industry royalty of 15 percent.

=== Internet and digital labels ===
With the Internet now being the dominant source for obtaining music, netlabels have emerged. Depending on the ideals of the net label, music files from the artists may be downloaded free of charge or for a fee that is paid via PayPal or other online payment system. Some of these labels also offer hard copy CDs in addition to direct download. Digital Labels are the latest version of a 'net' label. Whereas 'net' labels were started as a free site, digital labels represent more competition for the major record labels.

=== Open-source labels ===
The new century brought the phenomenon of open-source or open-content record labels. These are inspired by the free software and open source movements and the success of Linux.

=== Publishers as labels ===
In the mid-2000s, some music publishing companies began undertaking the work traditionally done by labels. The publisher Sony/ATV Music, for example, leveraged its connections within the Sony family to produce, record, distribute, and promote Elliott Yamin's debut album under a dormant Sony-owned imprint, rather than waiting for a deal with a proper label.

=== Crowdfunded labels ===
In 2002, ArtistShare was founded as the Internet's first record label where the releases were directly funded by the artist's fans.

== See also ==
- Independent record label
- List of record labels
- List of largest music deals
- Music
- Music industry
- Music recording sales certification
- Streaming media
- White label record
