= Jamie MacDonald discography =

- Studio albums: 1
- Singles: 6
- Promotional singles: 6
- Music videos: 8
- Featured singles: 2

American singer Jamie MacDonald has released one studio album, one demo album, six singles (two of which as a featured performer), six promotional singles, and eight music videos.

== Albums ==
=== Studio albums ===
| Title | Details | Peak chart positions | | |
| Title | Details | US Top | US Christ. | UK Down. |
|---|---|---|---|---|
| Jamie MacDonald | Released: January 23, 2026; Label: Capitol Christian Music Group; Formats: CD, LP, digital download, streaming | 18 | 3 | 88 |

=== Demo albums ===
| Title | Details |
|---|---|
| Waves of Redemption (as Jamie Lyn) | Released: 2014; Label: Independent; Formats: CD |

== Singles ==
=== As lead artist ===
| Title | Year | Peak chart positions | | | | | | | Certifications | Album |
| Title | Year | US Digital | US Christ. | US Christ. Air. | US Christ. AC | US Christ. Stream. | AUS Christ. | NZ | Certifications | Album |
|---|---|---|---|---|---|---|---|---|---|---|
| "Desperate" (original or with Lauren Daigle) | 2025 | — | 10 | 3 | 1 | 19 | 6 | — (Note: "Desperate" did not enter the RadioScope New Zealand Hot 100 chart, but peaked at number 28 on the New Zealand Airplay chart.) | RIAA: Gold | Jamie MacDonald |
| "Left It in the River" | 2025 | 10 | 5 | 1 | 1 | 18 | 3 | 90 | RIAA: Gold | Jamie MacDonald |
| "Ain't No Way" | 2026 | — | 11 | 1 | 3 | — | 1 | — (Note: "Ain't No Way" did not enter the RadioScope New Zealand Hot 100 chart, but peaked at number 23 on the New Zealand Airplay chart.) | | Jamie MacDonald |
| "A Million Chances" (original or with Tori Kelly) | 2026 | — | 12 | 16 | 21 | — | 18 | — | | Jamie MacDonald |
"—" denotes a recording that did not chart or was not released in that territory.

=== As featured artist ===
| Title | Year | Peak chart positions | | Album |
| Title | Year | US Christ. | NZ Air. | Album |
|---|---|---|---|---|
| "God Did It" (TobyMac featuring Jamie MacDonald) | 2025 | 35 | — | Heaven on My Mind |
| "The Lord Will Provide" (Passion featuring Landon Wolfe and Jamie Macdonald | 2025 | — | — | Non-album single |
| "Roots" (The Chosen featuring Jamie MacDonald) | 2026 | 27 | 30 | The Chosen – Inspired By (Seasons 1-5) |
"—" denotes a recording that did not chart or was not released in that territory.

== Promotional singles ==
| Title | Year | Album |
|---|---|---|
| "Who He Is" | 2025 | Jamie MacDonald |
| "You Can't Take My Song" | 2025 | Jamie MacDonald |
| "My Family" | 2025 | Jamie MacDonald |
| "Just the Two of Us" | 2026 | Non-album singles |
| "Everything I Do (I Do It For You)" (Bryan Adams cover) | 2026 | Non-album singles |

== Other charted songs ==
| Title | Year | Peak chart positions | | Album |
| Title | Year | US Christ. | NZ Air. | Album |
|---|---|---|---|---|
| "Unbreakable" (with Lecrae) | 2025 | — | 19 | House of David: Music Inspired by the Prime Video Original Series |
| "Won't Let Go" | 2026 | 26 | 30 | Jamie MacDonald |
"—" denotes a recording that did not chart or was not released in that territory.

== Other appearances ==
| Title | Year | Album |
|---|---|---|
| "My Father's World" (Chris Tomlin featuring Aodhán King, Jamie MacDonald, and CalledOut Music) | 2025 | The King Is Still the King |
| "Flowers" (Phil Wickham featuring Jamie MacDonald) | 2026 | Song of the Saints (Deluxe) |
| "We Turn Our Eyes" (Tommee Profitt featuring Jamie MacDonald) | 2026 | The Resurrection of a King |

== Music videos ==
| Title | Year | Album | Type | Source |
|---|---|---|---|---|
| "A Million Chances" | 2024 | Jamie MacDonald | Performance | YouTube |
| "Desperate" | 2025 | Jamie MacDonald | Lyrics | YouTube |
| "Who He Is" | 2025 | Jamie MacDonald | Lyrics | YouTube |
| "Left It in the River" | 2025 | Jamie MacDonald | Narrative | YouTube |
| "You Can't Take My Song" | 2025 | Jamie MacDonald | Lyrics | YouTube |
| "My Family" | 2025 | Jamie MacDonald | Performance | YouTube |
| "Won't Let Go" | 2026 | Jamie MacDonald | Narrative | YouTube |
| "Ain't No Way" | 2026 | Jamie MacDonald | Lyrics | YouTube |
