= The Resurrection of a King =

Studio album by Tommee Profitt
- Released: March 27, 2026
- Length: 90:00
- Label: Capitol CMG
- Producer: Profitt

Tommee Profitt chronology
Cinematic Songs (Vol. 9) (2025)	The Resurrection of a King (2026)	Human (2026)

Singles from The Resurrection of a King
- 1. "He Arose" Released: February 6, 2026; 2. "Just as I Am" Released: February 27, 2026; 3. "Nothing But the Blood" Released: March 6, 2026; 4. "There Is Power" Released: March 13, 2026; 5. "Blessed Assurance" Released: March 20, 2026

The Resurrection of a King is the second holiday album and sixteenth album overall by the American record producer and songwriter Tommee Profitt. The album was released on March 27, 2026, to digital download, streaming, CD, and LP formats, via Capitol Christian Music Group. It is Easter-themed and serves as a sequel to Profitt's preceding Christmas-themed release, The Birth of a King (2020).

The Resurrection of a King was produced by Profitt. The featured performers on the album include Ben Fuller, Phil Wickham, Crowder, CeCe Winans, Mara Justine, Abe Parker, Jeremy Rosado, Jon Reddick, Jenn Johnson, Isaac Mather, Bay Turner, Anthony Evans, Jamie MacDonald, Fleurie, Jordan Smith, Aubree Archibeck, and Stanaj. The album was supported by the release of four singles, "He Arose", "Just as I Am", "Nothing but the Blood", "There Is Power", and "Blessed Assurance". "He Arose" peaked at number 30 on the Billboard Hot Christian Songs chart.

== Release and promotion ==
A collaboration with Wickham, titled "He Arose", was released as the lead single from The Resurrection of a King on February 6, 2026. The song was promoted with the release of a music video, which was uploaded to YouTube. Upon the track's release, the forthcoming album was announced, with the revealing of its title, track list, release date, and cover artwork. "He Arose" is a reimagination of the traditional hymn "Up From the Grave He Arose".

A collaboration with Reddick, "Just as I Am", was released on February 27, 2026, as the album's second single. In an interview with NiNe., Profitt explained that "Just as I Am" has, most often, been performed "gently" and "set to simple piano", although he interpreted it differently; he believed that the song contains "incredible lyric lines" which tend to "get overlooked". In attempt to emphasize the song's "gritty, confident, and strong" lyrics, Profitt produced the track to contain a prominent "rock-gospel" style. The song was promoted with the release of a music video, which was uploaded to YouTube. On March 6, 2026, the third single from the album was released, "Nothing but the Blood", which featured Rosado. In spite of Profitt believing the track to be one of the best on the album, "Nothing but the Blood" was a "last-minute addition", because he had simply forgotten to record the track until a week before it was due. Profitt was able to complete the track within three days. The song was promoted with the release of a music video, which was uploaded to YouTube.

The fourth single from The Resurrection of a King, a collaboration with Crowder titled "There Is Power", was released on March 13, 2026. "There Is Power" is the second collaboration between Crowder and Profitt – on The Birth of a King, the former appeared on a rendition of "Go Tell It on the Mountain". The song was characterized for Crowder's "big screams" and "yells" which he performs on the track. Profitt attempted to repeat this vocal style on "There Is Power". Crowder and Profitt were unable to appear in studio together and recorded the track over a FaceTime call, which Profitt believed helped in "pushing him to sing higher and hold notes longer throughout the recording". The song was promoted with the release of a music video, which was uploaded to YouTube. On March 20, 2026, "Blessed Assurance", with Justine, was released as the fifth and final single from the album. The song was promoted with the release of a music video, which was uploaded to YouTube.

== Production and style ==
The Resurrection of a King is composed primarily of what Profitt described to be "cinematic [reimaginings] of timeless hymns". Similar to much of his previous work, the album has often been noted for its production style, which implements "cinematic" and "epic" sounds. Clara Bajalan of Jubilee Cast described the album as "cinematic, intense, and unapologetically bold", containing "sweeping orchestration and dramatic production". Niagara Country Tribune observed the use of "a sonic landscape that feels larger-than-life", while Jesus Freak Hideout praised the "vulnerable and unfiltered" sound.

Profitt attempted to model the album after The Birth of a King, believing that, "in order for The Resurrection of a King to feel like a true sequel, it needed to be the same". He claimed that he had "never been more inspired making music in my entire life", describing the album's development as "so powerful and emotional". He felt that the album was "a life purpose". Profitt explained that "these old traditional songs are so rich and meaty in content, but some of them aren't very accessible to how people listen to and sing along with music today". He spent more than a decade with the development of The Resurrection of a King.

== Reception ==
Professional ratings
Review scores
Source	Rating
Jesus Freak Hideout	5/5 stars
Jubilee Cast	4/5 stars

=== Critical ===
Writing for Jubilee Cast, Timothy Yap awarded the album with a score of 4-out-of-5, praising that the album's "orchestral instincts elevate... the material", although he was critical of "its tendency toward overproduction". Yap described the "push-and-pull between brilliance and excess" to be "breathtaking" at points, while becoming "too dense or conceptually ambitious" at others.

=== Commercial ===
The Resurrection of a King contained one charted song, "He Arose". "He Arose" debuted at its peak position of number 30 on the Billboard Hot Christian Songs chart, supportively appearing at number 4 on the Christian Digital Song Sales chart. The peak marked Profitt's second highest-charted song on the Hot Christian Songs chart, and his only song to appear on the chart without receiving recognition on the Christian Airplay chart. It also became Profitt's first entry onto the Christian Digital Song Sales chart.

=== Accolades ===
Year	Organization	Category	Result	Ref.
2026	Dove Awards	Long Form Music Video of the Year	Won	

== Track listing ==
All tracks are written and produced by Tommee Profitt, except where noted.

The Resurrection of a King track listing
No.	Title	Writer(s)	Performer	Length
1.	"Were You There?"			5:09
2.	"Old Rugged Cross"		Ben Fuller	3:00
3.	"He Arose"	Profitt; Phil Wickham	Wickham	4:49
4.	"There Is Power"		Crowder	3:21
5.	"Jesus Paid It All"		CeCe Winans	3:46
6.	"Blessed Assurance"		Mara Justine	4:39
7.	"At the Cross"	Profitt; Abe Parker	Parker	4:35
8.	"Nothing but the Blood"		Jeremy Rosado	4:31
9.	"Christ the Lord Is Risen Today"			3:58
10.	"Just as I Am"	Profitt; Jon Reddick	Reddick	3:04
11.	"When I Survey"	Profitt; Jenn Johnson	Johnson	5:32
12.	"Grace Greater Than Our Sin"		Isaac Mather	4:08
13.	"It Is Well"	Profitt; Bill Gaither; Gloria Gaither	Bay Turner	5:52
14.	"I Have Decided to Follow Jesus"		Anthony Evans	3:55
15.	"We Turn Our Eyes"		Jamie MacDonald	5:55
16.	"I'll Fly Away"		Fleurie	4:00
17.	"My Jesus, I Love Thee"		Jordan Smith	7:24
18.	"How Great Thou Art"		Aubree Archibeck	7:57
19.	"Amazing Grace (He's Alive)"		Stanaj	5:06
Total length:				90:00

== Personnel ==
Credits adapted from Tidal.

- Brooke Voland – choir
- Debi Selvy – choir
- Devonne Fowlkes – choir
- Emoni Wilkins – choir
- Jase Keithley – mixer, engineer
- Jeff Anderson – vocal engineer
- Jenn Johnson – writer (11)
- Jess Fox – choir
- Jon Reddick – writer (10)
- Mike Cervantes – masterer
- Moiba Mustapha – choir
- Phil Wickham – writer (3)
- Ron Poindexter – choir
- Sam Tinnesz – guitar (2, 7)
- Sean Moffitt – mixer
- Setnick Sene – choir
- Tommee Profitt – writer, producer, mixer
- Travis Cottrell – choir
- Wil Merrill – choir

== Charts ==
Chart performance for The Resurrection of a King
Chart (2026)	Peak position
UK Christian & Gospel Albums (Official Charts)	19
US Top Christian Albums (Billboard)	11

== Release history ==
Release history and formats for The Resurrection of a King
Region	Date	Format(s)	Label(s)	Ref.
Various	March 27, 2026	LP; digital download; streaming	Capitol CMG	
Various	May 1, 2026	CD	Capitol CMG	
