= 2026 K-Love Fan Awards =

Christian music awards

- Date: May 29, 2026
- Location: Grand Ole Opry in Nashville, Tennessee
- Hosted by: Lauren Daigle; Sadie Robertson Huff

Highlights
- Most wins: Brandon Lake (2)
- Most nominations: Phil Wickham (4)

Television/radio coverage
- Network: TBN

The 2026 K-Love Fan Awards was held at the Grand Ole Opry in Nashville. The 13th annual show was broadcast via TBN and streamed via TBN+ on Friday, May 29, 2026. Lauren Daigle and Sadie Robertson Huff hosted the awards ceremony.

== Background ==
The K-Love Fan Awards are an annual fan-voted award ceremony for contemporary Christian music. The awards "honor artists, songs and performances in Christian music across multiple categories", while also "recognizing standout achievements in film, television, books, sports and digital media." Fan voting concluded on May 22, 2026.

== Winners and nominees ==
Artist of the Year	Song of the Year
Brandon Lake; Jeremy Camp; Lauren Daigle; Elevation Worship; Jamie MacDonald; MercyMe; Josiah Queen; TobyMac; Phil Wickham; CeCe Winans	"Left It in the River" – Jamie MacDonald; "Can't Steal My Joy" – Josiah Queen and Brandon Lake; "Get Behind Me" – Emerson Day; "Heaven on My Mind" – TobyMac; "Let It Be a Hallelujah" – Lauren Daigle; "Make It Well – MercyMe; "No Fear" – Jon Reddick; "No Survivors" – Jeremy Camp; "The Love I Have For You" – Colton Dixon; "Wait for Me" – Zach Williams; "What an Awesome God" – Phil Wickham; "Won’t Start Now" – Seph Schlueter
Worship Song of the Year	Breakout Single of the Year
"Homesick for Heaven" – Phil Wickham; "Alleluia" – Elevation Worship; "How Good It Is" – Chris Tomlin; "Mighty Name of Jesus" – Hope Darst and Josh Baldwin; "The Lord Will Provide" – Passion; "Washed" – Elevation Rhythm	"Get Behind Me" – Emerson Day; "All Joy" – Natalie Layne; "I Need You" – Jet Trouble; "Somebody’s Praying" – Bay Turner; "Stay" – Zahriya Zachary; "Where Would I Be" – Peter Burton; "Why Should I Worry "– Carly Ann Taylor
Female Artist of the Year	Male Artist of the Year
CeCe Winans; Blanca; Leanna Crawford; Lauren Daigle; Hope Darst; Emerson Day; Jamie MacDonald; Katy Nichole; Terrian; Anne Wilson	Brandon Lake; Jeremy Camp; Ben Fuller; Josiah Queen; Jon Reddick; Seph Schlueter; Chris Tomlin; Tauren Wells; Matthew West; Phil Wickham
Group of the Year	Film Impact
MercyMe; CAIN; Caleb & John; Elevation Rhythm; Elevation Worship; For King & Country; Passion; We the Kingdom	I Can Only Imagine 2 (Lionsgate); David (Angel Studios); Light of the World (Salvation Poem Project); Sarah's Oil (Amazon MGM Studios); Soul on Fire (Sony Pictures); The King of Kings (Angel Studios); The Last Rodeo (Angel Studios); Truth & Treason (Angel Studios)
TV/Streaming Impact	Podcast Impact
House of David: Season 2 (Prime Video); Fighting Spirit: A Combat Chaplain’s Journey (Wonder Project); Miracle (Angel Studios); The Chosen Adventures (Prime Video); Testament (Angel Studios); The Promised Land (Angel Studios); Virgin Birth (K-Love On Demand)	"Whoa That's Good" – Sadie Robertson Huff; "Back Porch Theology" – Lisa Harper; "Girls Gone Bible" – Angela Halili and Arielle Reitsma; "Hey! It's the Lusko's" – Levi and Jennie Lusko; "Livin' The Bream" – Shannon Bream; "The Bible Recap" – Tara-Leigh Cobble; "The Bryce Crawford Podcast" – Bryce Crawford; "There Is More Podcast" – Karen McAdams and Rachel Faulkner Brown
Book Impact	Sports Impact
"Hey Girl" – Anne Wilson; "And She Got Up" – Courtney Pray Duke; "Beloved" – Francis Chan; "Blessed Are The Spiraling" – Levi Lusko; "Jesus Shaped Life" – Lisa Harper; "Joy Bomb" – Tauren Wells; "Tame Your Thoughts" – Max Lucado; "We're So Blessed" – CAIN	Coach RAC (Robert Anthony Cruz) – Savannah Bananas

== Performers ==
The following musical artists performed at the 2026 K-Love Fan Awards:

- Andrew Ripp
- Anne Wilson
- Ben Fuller
- CAIN
- Chandler Moore
- Chris Tomlin
- Elevation Worship
- Hope Darst
- Josh Baldwin
- Katy Nichole
- Lauren Daigle
- Leanna Crawford
- LO Worship
- MercyMe
- Pat Barrett
- Sam Wesley
- Terrian
- Tim Timmons
- Zach Williams

== Presenters ==
The following people were presenters at the 2026 K-Love Fan Awards:

- Blanca
- Colton Dixon
- David Leonard
- Franni Cash
- Jenn Johnson
- John Crist
- Jon Reddick
- Jonathan Roumie
- Kristian Stanfill
- Levi Lusko
- Dav Coretti and Brad Culver
- Megan Woods
- Michael W. Smith
- Michael Iskander
- Rachael Lampa
- Patrick Mayberry
- Shannon Bream
- Tasha Layton
