= New Hymns =

Studio album by Forrest Frank
- Released: October 20, 2023
- Length: 24:06
- Label: River House
- Producer: Forrest Frank

Forrest Frank chronology
California Cowboy (2023)	New Hymns (2023)	A Merry Lofi Christmas (2023)

Singles from New Hymns
- 1. "Nothing but the Blood (with Lecrae)" Released: August 18, 2023; 2. "Amazing Grace" Released: September 29, 2023; 3. "Go Tell It" Released: October 6, 2023; 4. "Jesus Paid It All" Released: October 13, 2023; 5. "Fly Away (with Hulvey)" Released: October 20, 2023

New Hymns is the fifth studio album by American Christian music artist Forrest Frank. The album was released on Frank's independent record label River House Records. It includes traditional Christian hymns, reimagined as lo-fi and rap/hiphop. It features guest appearances from rappers Lecrae and Hulvey. Five of the songs of the album were released as singles, and two of them entered the Billboard Hot Christian Songs chart. The album was released on October 20, 2023.

== Charting songs ==
The songs "Nothing but the Blood" (with Lecrae), "Amazing Grace", "Go Tell It", "Jesus Paid it All", and "Fly Away" (with Hulvey) were released as singles. The song "Fly Away" (with Hulvey) reached No. 43 on the Billboard Hot Christian Songs chart, and the song "Nothing but the Blood" (with Lecrae) reached No. 47 on the same chart. "Go Tell It" reached No. 7 on the UK Cross Rhythms chart.

== Track listing ==
No.	Title	Writer(s)	Length
1.	"Psalm 96" (intro)	Forrest Frank	1:16
2.	"Go Tell It"	Forrest Frank; John Wesley Work Jr.	2:43
3.	"Fly Away" (with Hulvey)	Forrest Frank; Albert E. Brumley	2:35
4.	"Peace" (interlude)	Forrest Frank	0:28
5.	"It Is Well"	Forrest Frank; Horatio Spafford	2:26
6.	"Amazing Grace"	Forrest Frank; John Newton	2:37
7.	"In the Room" (interlude)	Forrest Frank	0:51
8.	"Nothing but the Blood" (with Lecrae)	Forrest Frank; Lecrae Moore; Robert Lowry	3:08
9.	"Jesus Loves Me"	Forrest Frank; Anna Bartlett Warner	0:54
10.	"Jesus Paid it All (Worthy of the Price)"	Forrest Frank; Elvina M. Hall; John Grape	2:38
11.	"Come Thou Font"	Forrest Frank; Robert Robinson	3:21
12.	"Never Left" (outro)	Forrest Frank	1:06
Total length:			24:06

== Charts ==
Chart performance for New Hymns
Chart (2025)	Peak position
US Christian Albums (Billboard)	43

== Charting songs ==
Song	Chart (2023)	Peak position
"Fly Away"	US Hot Christian Songs (Billboard)	43
"Nothing but the Blood"	US Hot Christian Songs (Billboard)	47
