= Jamie MacDonald (album) =

Studio album by Jamie MacDonald
- Released: January 23, 2026
- Genres: Gospel; soul pop; funk
- Length: 47:47
- Label: Capitol CMG
- Producers: Justin Amundrud; Andrew Bergthold; Austin Davis; Petey Martin; Aaron Robertson; Jordan Sapp; Josh Silverberg; Colby Wedgeworth; Derek Winkley

Jamie MacDonald chronology
Waves of Redemption (2014)	Jamie MacDonald (2026)

Singles from Jamie MacDonald
- 1. "Desperate" Released: January 3, 2025; 2. "Left It in the River" Released: July 18, 2025; 3. "Ain't No Way" Released: March 9, 2026; 4. "A Million Chances" Released: October 19, 2026

Alternative cover
- Jamie MacDonald (The Deluxe Album) cover

Singles from Jamie MacDonald (The Deluxe Album)
- 1. "Used to Be" Released: September 25, 2026

Jamie MacDonald is the self-titled debut studio album by Jamie MacDonald. The album was released on January 23, 2026, via Capitol Christian Music Group, to CD, LP, digital download, and streaming formats. The production of the album was handled by Justin Amundrud, Andrew Bergthold, Austin Davis, Petey Martin, Aaron Robertson, Jordan Sapp, Josh Silverberg, Colby Wedgeworth, and Derek Winkley. The album features a guest appearance from Lauren Daigle.

The album was supported by the release of three singles, "Desperate", "Left It in the River", "Ain't No Way", and "A Million Chances". The four songs entered the Billboard Hot Christian Songs chart, peaking at Nos. 10, 5, 11, and 34, respectively. "Who He Is", "You Can't Take My Song", and "My Family" were released as promotional singles. Although not released as a single, the song "Won't Let Go" peaked at No. 26 on the Hot Christian Songs chart. A deluxe edition of the album, promoted by the single "Used to Be" and containing several additional tracks of unreleased and remixed material, is scheduled for release on October 16, 2026.

== Background ==
In November 2024, Capitol Christian Music Group announced that they had signed MacDonald to their roster, following her work with other various musicians, such as Anne Wilson, Danny Gokey, and Zach Williams, as a background vocalist. With the announcement, it was also announced that MacDonald's major label debut, "A Million Chances", would be released as a promotional single on November 15, 2024. On October 17, 2025, MacDonald's album was announced for release, and with the release of "You Can't Take My Song" on October 24, 2025, it was made available for preorder.

== Release and promotion ==
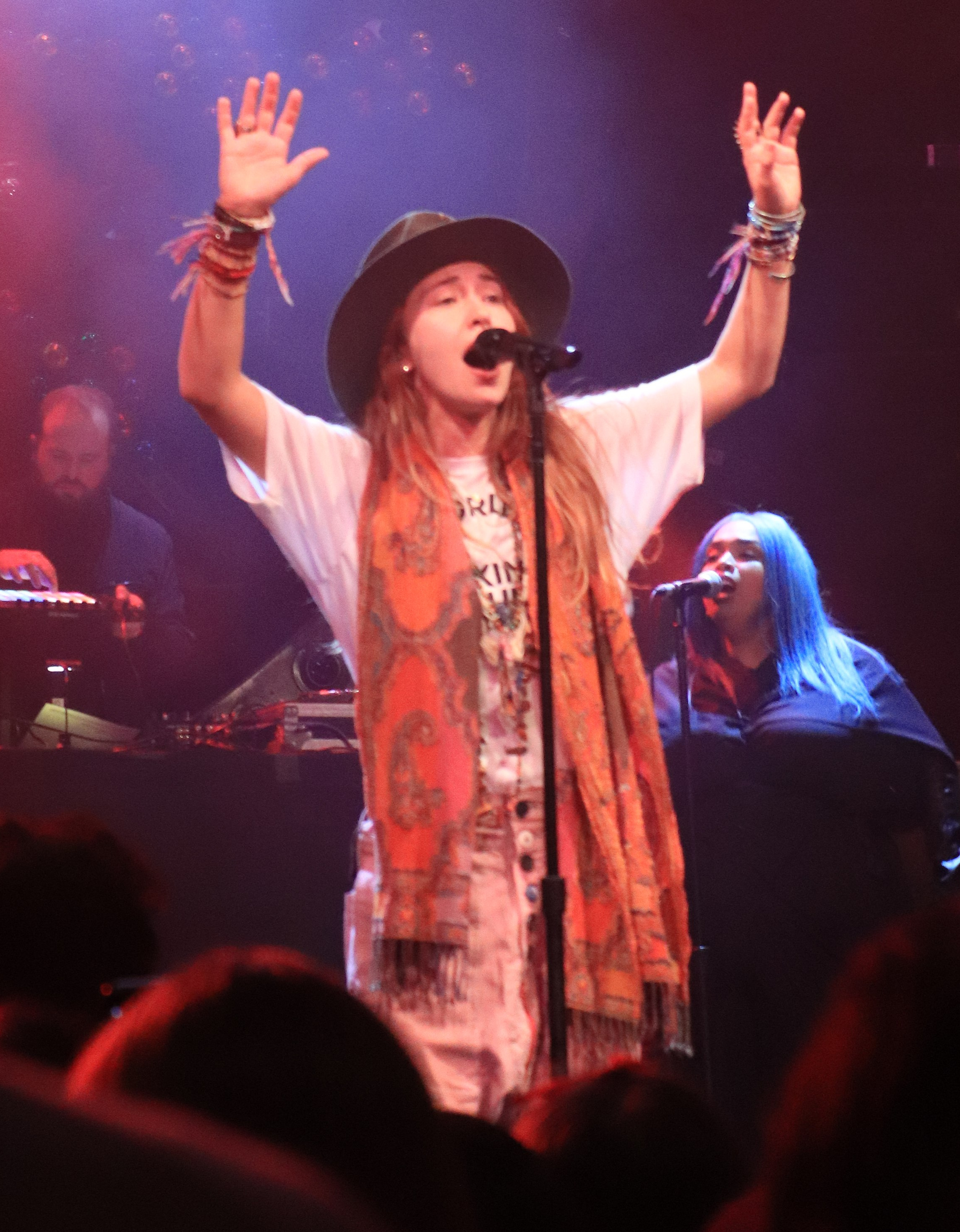
Lauren Daigle, who was featured on a rendition of "Desperate"

In November 2024, Capitol Christian Music Group announced that they had signed MacDonald to their roster, following her work with other various musicians, such as Anne Wilson, Danny Gokey, and Zach Williams, as a background vocalist. With the announcement, it was also announced that MacDonald's major label debut, "A Million Chances", would be released as a promotional single on November 15, 2024. The promotional single was made available for preorder. With its release, the song was supported with a music video. "A Million Chances" was written by MacDonald, Davis, and Early, while Early produced.

The song "Desperate" was released on January 3, 2025, as the second single from Jamie MacDonald. The song was inspired, in part, by the death of MacDonald's father, alongside what MacDonald described as, "several ongoing life situations that were weighing heavy on our hearts but completely out of our control". On June 6, 2025, an extended single was released, featuring four remixed or alternate recordings of the song. A rendition of the song, featuring Lauren Daigle, was released on July 11, 2025. Both the original and Lauren Daigle versions of the song were supported by the release of a music video. The song was written by MacDonald, Gamble, and Sapp, while Sapp produced.

On March 21, 2025, "Who He Is" was released as the second promotional single from the album. It was supported by a lyric video. The song was written MacDonald, Holt, and Davis, while Davis produced.

The fourth single of the album, "Left It in the River", was released on July 18, 2025. Before being made available digital download and streaming formats on July 31, 2025, the song was released to Christian radio in the United States. It was premiered with a live performance to K-Love radio stations. A live acoustic version of the song was released on July 31, 2025. Music videos were released in support of both the original and live acoustic versions of the song. The song was written by MacDonald, Wedgeworth, and Gamble, while Aaron Robertson produced.

On October 24, 2025, "You Can't Take My Song" was released as a promotional single. It was written by MacDonald, Winkley, and Jackson, while Winkley produced. The song was also supported by a lyric video. Alongside the song's release, MacDonald's album was announced. "My Family" was released on November 14, 2025, as the album's fourth and final promotional single. Upon the release of the album, a music video was released for "Won't Let Go". On March 9, 2026, the song "Ain't No Way" was released as a single. On September 25, 2026, the song "Used to Be" was released as a single, and with the releae it was announced that the song, along with several other previously unreleased songs or remixes of album tracks, would appear on a deluxe edition of the album, slated for a release date of October 16. On October 19, 2026, "A Million Chances" was released to Christian radio as the fourth and final single from Jamie MacDonald.

== Touring ==
On December 5, 2025, MacDonald announced that she would be embarking on the Left It in the River Tour with Taylor Hill, which would visit eight locations in the United States and last from February 19 to March 1, 2026.

== Writing and production ==
In an interview with Lindsay Williams of K-Love, MacDonald mentioned Lauryn Hill, Mariah Carey, and Whitney Houston as her main influences in music. Reflecting on the meaning behind the album, MacDonald noted that:

For over a decade, I’ve held onto God’s promise that I would one day write songs that would first heal me, and then bring healing to others. That time is now. Through writing and singing these songs, I’ve felt shame break off, fear fade, and my heart soften as walls come down. Now that I’m walking in that promised healing, I’m ready to see the other part fulfilled which is bringing that same hope and healing to others. Grateful for it all and excited to see it all unfold. All for His glory.

Josh Balogh of Jesus Freak Hideout described MacDonald's voice to be "smoky", "bluesy", "steeped in heartache", and overall "gorgeous". K-Love explained it to be "soulful gospel". GodTube observed that the album's tracks are "rooted in honesty, faith, and healing", "showcasing MacDonald’s heart for connecting with listeners through authentic storytelling." Shore Fire Media observed "You Can't Take My Song" to demonstrate "authenticity that celebrates finding strength in vulnerability", which "reflects MacDonald’s journey of reclaiming her voice and embracing the power of her story." "Desperate" was described by Josh Balogh of Jesus Freak Hideout to be "raw" and "soul-stirring" Billboard observed the lyrics to be about "finding hope, comfort, identity, and revitalizing freedom through faith."

Speaking for K-Love, Lindsay Williams stated that the album was a "culmination of a lifetime of whispered prayers and deferred hope," describing the lyrics as "mature and profound." She observed that the songs contained "emotional vulnerability and universal resonance, sure to make her a household name for years to come." The styles of Jamie MacDonald have been described as gospel music, soul pop, and funk.

== Reception ==
Professional ratings
Review scores
Source	Rating
JubileeCast	4/5 stars
Louder Than Music	5/5 stars

=== Critical ===
Jamie MacDonald received generally positive reception from critics. Timothy Yap of JubileeCast awarded the album a four-out-five-star review, describing it as a work characterized by personal reflection and themes of healing. He obseved it as "intentionally personal", sounding "like a journal set to music". Yap noted that the project adopts a testimonial approach, emphasizing vulnerability and lived experience in its songwriting. He identified "You Can't Take My Song" as a central track that articulates the album's focus on identity and resilience. Yap also highlighted the reimagined version of "Desperate", featuring Lauren Daigle, as a significant component of the record, adding that it provides additional emotional depth to the previously successful single. Other songs, including "Left It in the River", "A Million Chances", and "Proud of Me," were observed to contribute to the album's thematic progression of perseverance and renewal. Yap further remarked that the inclusion of interludes and reflective elements reinforces the album's emphasis on the gradual nature of healing. Louder Than Music awarded the album with five-out-of-five stars, describing it as "one of the most extraordinary albums I've heard in years."

=== Commercial ===
"Desperate" debuted at No. 39 on the Billboard Hot Christian Songs chart, later reaching No. 11 on the chart. Additionally, the song reached No. 3 on the Christian Airplay chart, and topped the Christian Adult Contemporary chart. It peaked at No. 3 on the Christian Digital Song Sales chart. Internationally, the song hit No. 10 on the Cross Rhythms UK Christian Airplay and No. 28 on the Radioscope New Zealand Most Added charts. "Left It in the River" peaked at No. 5 on the Billboard Hot Christian Songs, No. 2 on the Christian Airplay chart, No. 1 on the Christian Adult Contemporary chart, as well as No. 1 on the Christian Digital Song Sales chart.

Both "Desperate" and "Left It in the River" held records for the longest time spent at No. 1 on the Christian Adult Contemporary chart. "Desperate" held the former record of seven weeks, until "Left It in the River" broke that record with eight weeks by the release of Jamie MacDonald.

The album itself debuted at number 18 on the Billboard Top Album Sales chart, number 3 on the Top Christian Albums chart, and number 1 on Luminate's Top Christian/Gospel Albums chart. Internationally, it also debuted at number 88 on the Official Charts Company's UK Album Downloads Chart. Jamie MacDonald also became both the most successful first-week streaming launch for a debut album by a female Christian artist, as well as the most successful for any debut album released via Capitol CMG.

=== Industry awards ===
==== Album ====
Year	Organization	Category	Result	Ref.
2026	Dove Awards	Pop/Contemporary Album of the Year	Nominated	
2027	Grammy Awards	Best Contemporary Christian Music Album	Pending	

==== Song-specific ====
Year	Organization	Nominee / work	Category	Result	Ref.
2025	K-Love Fan Awards	"Desperate"	Song of the Year	Nominated	
2025	K-Love Fan Awards	"Desperate"	Breakout Single of the Year	Nominated	
2025	Dove Awards	"Desperate"	Pop/Contemporary Recorded Song of the Year	Nominated	
2025	We Love Awards	"Desperate"	Song of the Year	Won	
2025	We Love Awards	"Desperate"	Collaboration of the Year	Won	
2026	K-Love Fan Awards	"Left It in the River"	Song of the Year	Won	
2026	Dove Awards	"Left It in the River"	Song of the Year	Nominated	
2026	Dove Awards	"Left It in the River"	Pop/Contemporary Recorded Song of the Year	Nominated	
2026	ASCAP Awards	"Left It in the River"	Most Performed Christian Songs	Honored	
2027	Grammy Awards	"Left It in the River"	Best Contemporary Christian Music Performance/Song	Pending	

== Track listing ==
Jamie MacDonald track listing
No.	Title	Writer(s)	Producer(s)	Length
1.	"Wait" (intro)	Jamie MacDonald	Austin Davis	1:01
2.	"You Can't Take My Song"	MacDonald; Ran Jackson; Derek Winkley	Winkley; Davis^{[a]}	3:00
3.	"Left It in the River"	MacDonald; Jonathan Gamble; Colby Wedgeworth	Aaron Robertson; Wedgeworth^{[c]}	2:58
4.	"Desperate"	MacDonald; Gamble; Jordan Sapp	Sapp	3:31
5.	"Ain't No Way"	MacDonald; Davis; Gamble; Wedgeworth	Davis; Wedgeworth	2:49
6.	"A Million Chances"	MacDonald; Davis; Jessie Early	Davis	3:21
7.	"My Family"	MacDonald; Molly Kate Kestner; Nick Schwarz	Davis; Schwarz^{[v]}	3:46
8.	"Proud of Me"	MacDonald; Hank Bentley; Davis	Davis	3:11
9.	"Right Where I Belong" (interlude)	MacDonald; Harold Brown; Mark Schoolmeister	Davis	0:49
10.	"Who He Is"	MacDonald; Davis; Andrew Holt	Davis	3:55
11.	"Won't Let Go"	MacDonald; Sam Gray; Patrick Martin	Davis; Petey Martin^{[p]}	3:10
12.	"Born to Fly"	MacDonald; Lyndsey Iellimo; Wedgeworth	Wedgeworth	3:31
13.	"Can You Hear Me" (demo)	MacDonald; Andrew Bergthold	Bergthold	3:20
14.	"How the Story Ends"	MacDonald; Justin Amundrud; Kestner	Amundrud	2:45
15.	"Desperate" (featuring Lauren Daigle)	MacDonald; Gamble; Sapp	Sapp; Gamble^{[c]}	3:31
16.	"Somebody Set Me Free"	MacDonald; Early; Amos Evans; Josh Silverberg	Silverberg	3:29
Total length:				47:47

Jamie MacDonald (The Deluxe Album) track listing
No.	Title	Writer(s)	Producer(s)	Length
1.	"Wait" (intro)	Jamie MacDonald	Kyle Williams	3:13
2.	"Used to Be"	MacDonald; Williams; Dwan Hill	Williams; Danny López	3:01
3.	"On My Way"	Patrick Smith; Jonathan Gamble	Smith	3:14
4.	"A Million Chances" (featuring Tori Kelly)	MacDonald; Austin Davis; Jessie Early	Davis	3:26
5.	"You Can't Take My Song"	MacDonald; Ran Jackson; Derek Winkley	Winkley; Davis^{[a]}	3:00
6.	"Left It in the River"	MacDonald; Gamble; Colby Wedgeworth	Aaron Robertson; Wedgeworth^{[c]}	2:58
7.	"Desperate"	MacDonald; Gamble; Jordan Sapp	Sapp	3:31
8.	"Ain't No Way"	MacDonald; Davis; Gamble; Wedgeworth	Davis; Wedgeworth	2:49
9.	"A Million Chances"	MacDonald; Davis; Early	Davis	3:21
10.	"My Family"	MacDonald; Molly Kate Kestner; Nick Schwarz	Davis; Schwarz^{[v]}	3:46
11.	"Proud of Me"	MacDonald; Hank Bentley; Davis	Davis	3:11
12.	"Right Where I Belong" (interlude)	MacDonald; Harold Brown; Mark Alan Schoolmeesters	Brown	2:46
13.	"Who He Is" (demo)	MacDonald; Davis; Andrew Holt	Davis	3:55
14.	"Won't Let Go"	MacDonald; Sam Gray; Patrick Martin	Davis; Petey Martin^{[p]}	3:10
15.	"Born to Fly"	MacDonald; Lyndsey Iellimo; Wedgeworth	Wedgeworth	3:31
16.	"Can You Hear Me"	MacDonald; Andrew Bergthold	Bergthold	3:20
17.	"How the Story Ends"	MacDonald; Justin Amundrud; Kestner	Amundrud	2:45
18.	"Desperate" (featuring Lauren Daigle)	MacDonald; Gamble; Sapp	Sapp; Gamble^{[c]}	3:31
19.	"Somebody Set Me Free"	MacDonald; Early; Amos Evans; Josh Silverberg	Silverberg	3:29
20.	"Left It in the River" (soul)	MacDonald; Wedgeworth; Gamble	López	3:01
21.	"Ain't No Way" (studio session)	MacDonald; Davis; Wedgeworth; Gamble	MacDonald; Davis; Wedgeworth	2:47
22.	"Proud of Me" (live session)	MacDonald; Davis; Bentley	MacDonald; Davis	3:30
23.	"You Can't Take My Song" (acoustic)	MacDonald; Winkley; Jackson	Sapp	3:16
24.	"Who He Is" (acoustic)	MacDonald; Davis; Holt	Davis	3:35
25.	"Won't Let Go" (studio version)	MacDonald; Martin; Gray	MacDonald; Davis; Martin^{[v]}	3:06
26.	"A Million Chances" (live in studio)	MacDonald; Davis; Early	MacDonald; Davis	3:40
27.	"Desperate" (acoustic)	MacDonald; Gamble; Sapp	Sapp; Gamble^{[c]}	3:32
28.	"Left It in the River" (live)	MacDonald; Wedgeworth; Gamble	MacDonald; Robertson; Wedgeworth^{[c]}	3:53
29.	"Left It in the River" (backyard)	MacDonald; Wedgeworth; Gamble	MacDonald; Robertson; Wedgeworth^{[c]}	3:08
30.	"Left It in the River" (live acoustic)	MacDonald; Wedgeworth; Gamble	MacDonald	3:06
Total length:				1:38:00

=== Notes ===
- ^{^[p]} indicates a primary and vocal producer.
- ^{^[c]} indicates a co-producer.
- ^{^[a]} indicates an additional producer.
- ^{^[v]} indicates a vocal producer.

== Personnel ==
Credits adapted from Tidal.

=== Musicians ===
- Jamie MacDonald – vocals (all tracks), background vocals (tracks 4, 15), choir vocals (10)
- Aaron Sterling – drums (3, 4, 6, 10, 15), percussion (3)
- Jonathan Gamble – background vocals (3, 4, 15)
- Jason Eskridge – choir vocals (3, 7, 10), choir arrangement (3), background vocals (6)
- Wil Merrell – choir vocals (3, 7, 10), background vocals (6)
- Kiley Phillips – choir vocals (3, 10), background vocals (6)
- Emoni Wilkins – choir vocals (3, 7)
- Aaron Robertson – percussion, piano, programming (3)
- David Liotta – acoustic guitar, electric guitar (3)
- Colby Wedgeworth – background vocals, programming (3)
- Shae Wooten – bass (3)
- Joey Richey – choir vocals (3)
- Jordan Sapp – acoustic guitar, electric guitar, keyboards, percussion, programming (4, 15)
- Dom Liberati – bass guitar (4, 15)
- Becca Bradley – cello (4, 15)
- BC Taylor – percussion (4, 15)
- Austin Davis – percussion (6, 10, 11), guitar (6), drums (7, 11); choir vocals, programming (10); bass guitar, piano, strings, synthesizer (11)
- Devonne Fowlkes – background vocals (6), choir vocals (10)
- Bernie Herms – piano (6, 10)
- Kristin Weber – violin (6), strings (7)
- McKendree Tucker – string arrangement (6)
- David Curran – bass guitar (7)
- Craig Robinson – choir vocals (7)
- Kendra Chantelle – choir vocals (7)
- Sarina-Joi – choir vocals (7)
- Cory Pierce – guitar (7)
- Grant Pittman – Hammond B3 (7)
- Cara Fox – strings (7)
- Cassandra Morrow – strings (7)
- Robert Chase – strings (7)
- Matthew Melton – bass (10)
- Andrew Holt – choir vocals (10)
- Chris Young – electric guitar (10)
- Dwan Hill – Hammond B3 (10)
- Petey Martin – background vocals, bass guitar, drums, percussion, piano, programming, strings, synthesizer (11)
- Andrew Bergthold – guitar, piano (13)
- Justin Amundrud – drums, guitar, keyboards (14)
- Lauren Daigle – vocals (15)
- Jacob Lowery – bass guitar (16)
- Jacob Schrodt – drums (16)
- Amos Evans – keyboards (16)

=== Technical ===
- Jason Eskridge – engineering (3)
- Jordan Sapp – engineering (4, 15)
- Dan Mackenzie – engineering, vocal editing (6, 10)
- Simon Lewin – engineering (6)
- Brad King – engineering (7, 10)
- Jared Fox – engineering (16)
- Jonathan Buffum – additional engineering (3)
- Thomas Lopez – additional engineering (7)
- Joel Setien – mixing (2)
- Jack Nellis – mixing (3)
- Sean Moffitt – mixing (4, 6, 10, 15)
- Doug Weier – mixing (7, 16)
- Jeff Juliano – mixing (11)
- Andrew Bergthold – mixing (13)
- Justin Amundrud – mixing (14)
- Sam Moses – mastering (2–4, 6, 7, 10, 13, 15, 16)

== Charts ==
Weekly chart performance for Jamie MacDonald
Chart (2026)	Peak position
UK Album Downloads (Official Charts)	88
US Top Album Sales (Billboard)	18
US Top Christian Albums (Billboard)	3

== Release history ==
Release history and formats for Jamie MacDonald
Region	Date	Format(s)	Label(s)	Ref.
Various	January 23, 2026	CD; LP; digital download; streaming	Capitol Christian Music Group	
