= Real Life/Real Worship =

Studio album by Anthony Evans
- Released: April 8, 2014
- Genre: CCM, R&B, urban gospel, worship
- Length: 52:20
- Label: Fair Trade
- Producer: Max Stark

Anthony Evans chronology
Home (2011)	Real Life/Real Worship (2014)	Back to Life (2017)

Real Life/Real Worship is the sixth studio album from Christian singer-songwriter Anthony Evans. The album was released on April 8, 2014 by Fair Trade Services and it was produced by Max Stark. The album achieved commercial successes and positive critical response.

== Background ==
This marks the sixth studio album from Anthony Evans, which the whole album was produced by the 22-year-old Los Angeles-based Max Stark, and it released on April 8, 2014 through Fair Trade Services.

== Critical reception ==
Professional ratings
Review scores
Source	Rating
AllMusic	4/5 stars
CCM Magazine	4/5 stars
Christian Music Review	4.5/5 stars
New Release Tuesday	4/5 stars

Real Life/Real Worship received positive reception from the ratings and reviews of music critics. At AllMusic, Andy Kellman rated the album four stars out of five, indicating how "Evans' lyrical approach remains the same, and he sounds comfortable over the gleaming synthesizers and battering drums that run through just over half of the album's songs." Andrew Greer of CCM Magazine rated the album four stars out of five, remarking that "the soul-tinged powerhouse maintains straightforward gospel lyrics, while musically offering significantly offering pop panache." At New Release Tuesday, Dwayne Lacy rated the album four out of five stars, stating that the album proves "He has gotten better and more versatile." Jay Heilman of Christian Music Review rated the album four-and-a-half out of five stars, writing that this is an "Excellent album" because it " will be an album that fans of all Christian music genres can embrace and find common ground with." At Hallels, Timothy Yap gave a positive review, saying that "is a melodious reminder that it's time Christian music should have an impact beyond the church's walls." Sam Smith, reviewing the album at Charisma, writes, "Through his experiences in Los Angeles, Evans discovered a deeper desire to communicate the gospel message with a broad audience—but using wisdom".

== Commercial performance ==
For the Billboard charting week of April 26, 2014, Real Life/Real Worship appeared at number 60 most sold album in all the United States by the Billboard 200. The album made it to number 4 on the Top Christian Album chart the same week. In addition, the album reached number 2 on the most sold Top Gospel Albums chart.

== Track listing ==
Track list
No.	Title	Writer(s)	Length
1.	"Never Fail"	Anthony Evans, Danielle Faith Munizzi, Martha Denise Munizzi	4:37
2.	"Greater Is He"	Evans, D. Munizzi, M. Munizzi	3:36
3.	"Something Beautiful"	Evans, Jason Ingram	3:46
4.	"What Could Have Been"	Evans, Bert Timothy Elliott, Krysta Marie Youngs	4:03
5.	"I Found You"	Evans, Cindy Morgan	4:09
6.	"Somebody to Call Home"	Evans, Michael D. Boggs	4:35
7.	"Ask"	Evans, D. Munizzi, M. Munizzi	5:50
8.	"No Condemnation" (featuring Priscilla Shirer)	Evans, D. Munizzi, M. Munizzi	7:03
9.	"All Things New"	Evans, M. Munizzi	4:45
10.	"I Won't Forget" (featuring Lois Evans)	Evans, Krissy Nordhoff	4:23
11.	"Mercy Tree"	Michael Neale, Nordhoff	5:33
Total length:			52:20

== Chart performance ==
Chart (2014)	Peak position
US Billboard 200	60
US Christian Albums (Billboard)	4
US Top Gospel Albums (Billboard)	2
