= Left It in the River =

Single by Jamie MacDonald

from the album Jamie MacDonald
- Released: July 18, 2025
- Length: 2:58
- Label: Capitol CMG
- Songwriters: Jamie MacDonald; Colby Wedgeworth; Jonathan Gamble
- Producer: Aaron Robertson

Jamie MacDonald singles chronology
| "Desperate" (2025) | "Left It in the River" (2025) | "Ain't No Way" (2026) |

Music videos
- "Left It in the River" on YouTube
- "Left It in the River" (Live acoustic) on YouTube

Alternative cover
- Live acoustic cover

"Left It in the River" is a song recorded by Jamie MacDonald. The song was released on July 18, 2025, via Capitol CMG, as the second single from MacDonald's self-titled debut studio album. The song was written by MacDonald, Colby Wedgeworth, and Jonathan Gamble. It was produced by Aaron Robertson.

== Release and promotion ==
"Left It in the River" was first released to Christian radio in the United States on July 18, 2025. It was premiered with a live performance at K-Love radio stations. On August 1, 2025, the song was released as a single to digital download and streaming formats. A live acoustic version of the song was also released on that day.

The song was supported by the release of an official music video for the original version on July 31, 2025, and the live acoustic version on October 22, 2025. On December 5, 2025, MacDonald announced that she would be embarking on the Left It in the River Tour with Taylor Hill, which would visit eight locations in the United States and last from February 19 to March 1, 2026.

== Writing and composition ==
Shore Fire Media observed the song to be "driven by a steady four-on-the-floor beat", with a chorus that states, "Where is my guilt, where is my shame? I left it in the river".

Speaking for K-Love, Michaela Halfast observed "Left It in the River" to be a "praise party from the first foot-tapping downbeat". Comparing it to MacDonald's previous single, "Desperate", she noted that the follow-up "stands in stark contrast to her hit debut", saying that, "If 'Desperate' made you want to cry, 'Left It In The River' will make you want to dance," therefore, "solidifying MacDonald as an artist with considerable range." The song was inspired by the process of baptism. MacDonald spoke on the meaning reflected by the song, saying that:

We wrote "Left It In The River" as a declaration of freedom. It's about what happens when you finally lay it down – the shame, the striving, the weight you were never meant to carry – and you leave it all behind. My prayer is that this song becomes your anthem of joy, renewal and freedom. May it meet you right where you are and remind you of the truth: Who the Son sets free is free indeed!

It is composed in the key of A♭, with a speed of 98 beats per minute and a time signature of 4/4.

=== Production ===
"Left It in the River" was written by MacDonald, Wedgeworth, and Gamble. It was produced by Robertson. The song was engineered by David Liotta and Jonathan Buffum, mixed Jack Nellis, and mastered by Sam Moses The live acoustic version of the song was produced by MacDonald, and mixed and mastered by Jordan Sapp.

== Reception ==
=== Commercial ===
"Left It in the River" peaked at No. 5 on the Billboard Hot Christian Songs, and led the Christian Airplay, Christian Adult Contemporary, and Christian Digital Song Sales charts. On the Christian Streaming Songs chart, the song reached No. 18, and on the overall Digital Song Sales chart, it reached No. 10.

Before its initial entry onto digital sales and streaming charts, the song debuted on the Christian Airplay chart on August 9, 2025 at No. 29. The following week, with its entry into the Christian Digital Song Sales chart at No. 4 and a rise to No. 24 on the Christian Airplay chart, the song entered the Hot Christian Songs chart at No. 29. On November 15, 2025, the song rose to hit No. 5 on the Hot Christian Songs chart. Concurrently, that week the song led the Christian Digital Song Sales and reached No. 10 on the Digital Song Sales. It entered the Christian Streaming Songs at No. 20.

=== Accolades ===
| Year | Organization | Category | Result | Ref. |
|---|---|---|---|---|
| 2026 | K-Love Fan Awards | Song of the Year | Won | |
| 2026 | Dove Awards | Song of the Year | Nominated | |
| 2026 | Dove Awards | Pop/Contemporary Recorded Song of the Year | Nominated | |
| 2026 | ASCAP Awards | Most Performed Christian Songs | Honored | |
| 2027 | Grammy Awards | Best Contemporary Christian Music Performance/Song | Pending | |

== Track listing ==
Left It in the River
| No. | Title | Writer(s) | Producer(s) | Length |
|---|---|---|---|---|
| 1. | "Left It in the River" | Jamie MacDonald; Colby Wedgeworth; Jonathan Gamble | Aaron Robertson | 2:58 |
| 2. | "Desperate" | MacDonald; Gamble; Jordan Sapp | Jordan Sapp | 3:31 |
| 3. | "Who He Is" | MacDonald; Andrew Holt; Austin Davis | Austin Davis | 3:35 |
| 4. | "A Million Chances" | MacDonald; Davis; Jessie Early | Davis | 3:21 |
| Total length: | | | | 13:25 |

Left It in the River (Redelivery)
| No. | Title | Writer(s) | Producer(s) | Length |
|---|---|---|---|---|
| 1. | "Left It in the River" (live acoustic) | Jamie MacDonald; Colby Wedgeworth; Jonathan Gamble | Jamie MacDonald | 3:08 |
| 2. | "Left It in the River" | MacDonald; Wedgeworth; Gamble | Aaron Robertson | 2:58 |
| Total length: | | | | 6:06 |

== Personnel ==
Credits adapted from Tidal Music.

=== Original ===
- Aaron Robertson – producer, percussion, programmer
- Aaron Sterling – percussion, piano
- Colby Wedgeworth – writer, background vocals, producer, programmer
- David Liotta – engineer, electric guitar
- Emoni Wilkins – choir
- Garrett Davis – artists and repertoire
- Jack Nellis – mixer
- Jamie MacDonald – writer, lead vocals
- Jason Eskridge – choir arranger, choir, recording engineer
- Joey Richey – choir
- Jonathan Buffum – engineer
- Jonathan Gamble – writer, background vocals
- Kiley Phillips – choir
- Sam Moses – masterer
- Shae Wooten – bass
- Will Merel – choir

=== Live acoustic ===
- Colby Wedgeworth – writer
- Jamie MacDonald – producer, writer, lead vocalist
- Jonathan Gamble – writer
- Jordan Sapp – masterer, mixer
- Garrett Davis – artists and repertoire

== Charts ==
=== Weekly ===
Weekly chart performance for "Left It in the River"
| Chart (2025–2026) | Peak position |
|---|---|
| Australia Christian Airplay (TCM) | 3 |
| New Zealand Hot 100 (Radioscope) | 90 |
| New Zealand Airplay (Radioscope) | 29 |
| US Christian Adult Contemporary (Billboard) | 1 |
| US Christian Airplay (Billboard) | 1 |
| US Digital Song Sales (Billboard) | 10 |
| US Hot Christian Songs (Billboard) | 5 |

=== Year-end ===
Year-end chart performance for "Left It in the River"
| Chart (2025) | Position |
|---|---|
| Australian Christian Airplay (TCM) | 19 |
| US Christian Airplay (Billboard) | 48 |
| US Hot Christian Songs (Billboard) | 63 |

== Certifications ==
| Region | Certification | Certified units/sales |
|---|---|---|
| United States (RIAA) | Gold | 500,000^{‡} |
^{‡} Sales+streaming figures based on certification alone.

== Release history ==
Release history for "Left It in the River"
| Region | Version | Date | Format | Label | Ref. |
|---|---|---|---|---|---|
| United States | Original | July 18, 2024 | Christian radio | Capitol CMG | |
| Various | Original | July 31, 2025 | Music video | Capitol CMG | |
| Various | Original | August 1, 2025 | Digital download; streaming | Capitol CMG | |
| Various | Live acoustic | August 1, 2025 | Digital download; streaming | Capitol CMG | |
| Various | Live acoustic | October 21, 2025 | Music video | Capitol CMG | |
| Various | Original | January 23, 2026 | CD; LP; digital download; streaming; (with Jamie MacDonald) | Capitol CMG | |
