= Desperate (Jamie MacDonald song) =

Single by Jamie MacDonald

from the album Jamie MacDonald
- Released: January 3, 2025
- Length: 3:30
- Label: Capitol Christian Music Group
- Songwriters: Jonathan Gamble; Jordan Sapp; Jamie MacDonald
- Producer: Jordan Sapp

Jamie MacDonald singles chronology
"Desperate" (2025)	"Left It in the River" (2025)

Lauren Daigle singles chronology
"Turbulent Skies" (2023)	"Desperate" (2025)	"Let It Be a Hallelujah" (2025)

Music video
- "Desperate" on YouTube

"Desperate" is the debut single by American contemporary Christian musician Jamie MacDonald. The song was officially released as a single on January 3, 2025, through Capitol CMG. It peaked at No. 10 on the Billboard Hot Christian Songs chart and No. 1 on the Christian adult contemporary chart. On June 6, 2025, an extended single was released, featuring four remixed or alternate recordings of the song.

On July 11, 2025, a rendition of the song featuring Lauren Daigle, was released.

== Writing and production ==
The song was written by MacDonald, Jonathan Gamble, and Jordan Sapp with Sapp as producer. Its central theme is the importance of having faith in difficult times. MacDonald said of the song:

"The lyrics for ‘Desperate’ were inspired by several ongoing life situations that were weighing heavy on our hearts but completely out of our control. Writing this with Jonathan and Jordan was truly a gift because both have become like brothers to me, and it was a safe space to share some really deep struggles that day, which led to the completion of this song."

The song was inspired by the death of MacDonald's father.

"Desperate" is in the key of F with a speed of 70 beats per minute and a time signature of 6/8.

== Accolades ==
"Desperate" was nominated at the 2025 K-Love Fan Awards for Song of the Year and Breakout Single of the Year. At the 2025 GMA Dove Awards, "Desperate" was nominated for Pop/Contemporary Recorded Song of the Year.

Year	Organization	Category	Result	Ref.
2025	K-Love Fan Awards	Song of the Year	Nominated	
2025	K-Love Fan Awards	Breakout Single of the Year	Nominated	
2025	GMA Dove Awards	Pop/Contemporary Recorded Song of the Year	Nominated	
2025	We Love Awards	Song of the Year	Won	
2025	We Love Awards	Collaboration of the Year	Won	

Year-end lists
Publication	Accolade	Rank	Ref.
K-Love	25 Songs That Defined 2025	Unordered	
New Release Today	Top 10 Songs of 2025	Unordered	

== Critical reception ==
Professional ratings
Review scores
Source	Rating
20 the Countdown Magazine	4.5/5 stars
Jesus Freak Hideout	4/5 stars

Speaking for Jesus Freak Hideout, Josh Balogh awarded the song a 4-out-of-5 star review, stating that the vocals "occasionally blur the line between MacDonald and Daigle, making it tricky to distinguish Daigle's feature", and that "a touch more separation could have highlighted her contribution", but still praised the song as a "heartrending anthem that transforms personal sorrow into collective hope".

== Commercial performance ==
"Desperate" debuted at No. 39 on the Billboard Hot Christian Songs chart, later reaching No. 11 on the chart. Additionally, the song reached No. 3 on the Christian Airplay chart, and topped the Christian adult contemporary chart. It peaked at No. 3 on the Christian Digital Song Sales chart.

Taking twelve weeks to reach the top position, Billboard credited the song as being the fastest rise to No. 1 on the Christian Adult Contemporary chart by a female artist, excluding holiday music, since Lauren Daigle's "You Say" in 2018. It became the first leading debut single by a female artist since Jordin Sparks' "Love Me Like I Am" in 2023. Remaining for seven weeks, the song also marked the longest run at No. 1 on the chart, until the record was broken by MacDonald's follow-up single, "Left It in the River".

== Track listing ==
Original
No.	Title	Writer(s)	Producer(s)	Length
1.	"Desperate"	Jonathan Gamble; Jordan Sapp; Jamie MacDonald	Jordan Sapp	3:30
2.	"A Million Chances"	Austin Davis; Jessie Early; MacDonald	Austin Davis	3:21
Total length:				6:52

Extended single
No.	Title	Writer(s)	Producer(s)	Length
1.	"Desperate"	Jonathan Gamble; Jordan Sapp; Jamie MacDonald	Jordan Sapp	3:30
2.	"Desperate" (studio session)	Jonathan Gamble; Jordan Sapp; Jamie MacDonald	Jordan Sapp	3:39
3.	"Desperate" (acoustic)	Jonathan Gamble; Jordan Sapp; Jamie MacDonald	Jordan Sapp	3:26
4.	"Desperate" (Worship Together version)	Jonathan Gamble; Jordan Sapp; Jamie MacDonald	Jordan Sapp	3:47
5.	"Desperate" (instrumental)	Jonathan Gamble; Jordan Sapp; Jamie MacDonald	Jordan Sapp	3:30
Total length:				17:54

== Personnel ==
Adapted from AllMusic.

- Aaron Sterling — drums
- Austin Davis – guitar, percussion
- BC Taylor – percussion
- Becca Bradley – cello
- Bernie Herms — piano
- Cara Fox – cello
- Dan Machenzie — vocal editing
- Devonne Fowikes — BGVs
- Dom Liberati – bass
- Jamie MacDonald — composer, writer, lead vocalist, BGVs
- Jason Eskridge – BGVs
- Jonathan Gamble – composer, producer, BGVs
- Jordan Sapp – composer, acoustic guitar, electric guitar, keyboards, percussion, programming, recording
- Kiley Phillips – BGVs
- Kristin Weber – violin
- McKandree Tucker — arranger
- Sam Moses — mastering, engineer
- Sean Moffitt — mixing
- Simon Lewin – engineer
- Wil Merrell – BGVs

== Charts ==
=== Weekly ===
Weekly chart performance for "Desperate"
Chart (2025)	Peak position
Australia Christian Airplay (TCM)	6
New Zealand Most Added (RadioScope)	28
UK Christian Airplay (Cross Rhythms)	10
US Hot Christian Songs (Billboard)	10
US Christian Airplay (Billboard)	3
US Christian Adult Contemporary (Billboard)	1

=== Year-end ===
Year-end chart performance for "Desperate"
Chart (2025)	Position
Australian Christian Airplay (TCM)	27
US Christian Airplay (Billboard)	12
US Christian Adult Contemporary (Billboard)	9
US Christian Songs (Billboard)	16

== Certifications ==
Region	Certification	Certified units/sales
United States (RIAA)	Gold	500,000^{‡}
^{‡} Sales+streaming figures based on certification alone.

== Release history ==
Release history for "Desperate"
Region	Version	Date	Format	Label	Ref.
Various	Single	January 3, 2025	Digital download; streaming	Capitol Christian Music Group	
Various	Extended single	January 6, 2025	Digital download; streaming	Capitol Christian Music Group	
