= Kingdmusic =

South African gospel singer

- Born: Moiter Denga Takalani; 4 October 1991 (age 35); Mukula, Limpopo, South Africa
- Genre: Gospel
- Occupations: Singer; songwriter; record; record producer
- Years active: 2000s-present

Kingdmusic (born Moiter Denga Takalani) is a South African gospel singer, songwriter and record producer. He has released the studio albums Seasons (2019), Denga (2021), Perfect Love (2022), Hold On (2024) and Joy (2026). His album Denga won Best Contemporary Faith Music Album at the 28th South African Music Awards (SAMA28) in 2022.

== Early life ==
Kingdmusic was born Moiter Denga Takalani and was raised in Mukula village in Venda, South Africa. He developed an interest in music through his local church, where he began singing at the age of 12. He started writing songs at the age of 14 and recorded his first professional studio single while he was a teenager.

His first song was "Always Loving You", an R&B single recorded with the support of his parents. He later focused his music career on Christian and gospel music.

== Career ==
Kingdmusic's early career included a series of singles and collaborations with South African gospel musicians. By 2019, he had released nine singles and an album he had performed at venues including Aula Theatre at the University of Pretoria, GrandWest Arena in Cape Town, the Alexander Theatre in Johannesburg, the Centurion Theatre and the Olive Convention Centre on Durban.

In 2018, Kingdmusic released "Upside Down" featuring Takie Ndou. The song's music video won Best Music Video at the INGOMA Awards.

In 2019, Kingdmusic released "Nobody Like You" featuring Nigerian British gospel musician CalledOut Music. The song became one of his notable international collaborations.

=== Seasons ===
Kingdmusic released his debut solo album, Seasons, in 2019. The album included collaborations with other gospel musicians and received recognition at the Limpopo Music Awards (LIMA) that were held at Meropa Casino Hotel in Polokwane. He won the award for Best Contemporary Gospel Album and Best Gospel Album.

=== Denga ===
Kingdmusic released his second studio album, Denga, in 2021. The album received the Best Contemporary Faith Music Album at the South African Music Awards (SAMA28) in 2022.

The award was initially presented to gospel singer Pulane Maphari for her album Sacrificial Worship (Live). The award was subsequently withdrawn after the Recording Industry of South Africa determined that Maphari's album did not meet the eligibility requirements.

Kingdmusic was then named the winner of the category for Denga.

The album featured collaborations with gospel musicians from South Africa and other countries.

=== Perfect Love ===
Kingdmusic released his third studio album, Perfect Love, in 2022. It featured Brazilian gospel singer Gabriela Gomes.

=== Hold On ===
His fourth studio album, Hold On, was released in 2024. The title track was subsequently reworked as an amapiano release under the name DENGA. CCM Magazine reported that DENGA. was a new project associated with Kingdmusic and that Hold On had originally been released by Kingdmusic before the amapiano version.

Kingdmusic had an interview with the South African Broadcasting Corporation (SABC) saying he has always wanted to make Christian music that everyone can relate to after the release of Hold On.

=== Joy ===
In 2026, Kingdmusic released his fifth studio album, Joy. The album was described by Sunday Tribune as a project centered on faith and collaboration.

The album took approximately two years to create and included One House, Isaiah Roberts, Luma Elpidio and Megan Rose.

"Drum Magazine" reported that the album was aimed at a generation seeking faith and explored themes of truth and Christian belief. The publication also discussed Kingdmusic's approach to contemporary gospel music and his desire to reach younger audiences.

== Collaborations ==
Kingdmusic has collaborated with gospel and Christian musicians from South Africa and internationally. His collaborators have included CalledOut Music, Deitrick Haddon, Terrian, Gabriela Gomes, Luma Elpidio, Nandy, Sarkodie, Takie Ndou and IMRSQD.

In April 2023, Kingdmusic performed as a supporting act for Naomi Raine during her first visit to South Africa, appearing alongside Brenden Praise at Rhema Bible Church in Randburg.

The singer also went on the Reconstruction tour with Grammy Award-winning rapper Lecrae.

== Musical style ==
Kingdmusic's music is primarily associated with contemporary gospel and Christian music. His later work has incorporated elements of contemporary popular music, including amapiano.

His 2026 album, Joy, incorporates contemporary influences while retaining Christian themes to younger audiences.

== Awards and nominations ==
Kingdmusic has received awards and nominations from the South African Music Awards, SABC Crown Gospel Awards, INGOMA Awards and Limpopo Music Awards.

Year	Award	Category	Work	Result
2019	Limpopo Music Awards	Best Contemporary Gospel Album	Seasons	Won
2022	South African Music Awards	Best Contemporary Faith Music Album	Denga	Won
2022	INGOMA Awards	Best Music Video	"Nguwe"	Won
2022	Limpopo Music Awards	Best Gospel Hit	"Miracles"	Won
2024	SABC Crown Gospel Music Awards	Best Gospel Rap	"Provider" featuring IMRSQD	Won
2024	SABC Crown Gospel Music Awards	Best Contemporary Song	"Jesus"	Won
2024	SABC Crown Gospel Music Awards	Best Gospel Music Video	"Jesus"	Nominated
2024	SABC Crown Gospel Music Awards	Best Gospel Album	"Jesus"	Nominated

== Studio albums ==
- Seasons (2019)
- Denga (2021)
- Perfect Love (2022)
- Hold On (2024)
- Joy (2026)
