= Tony Evans (pastor) =

American Christian pastor (born 1949)

Pastor Tony Evans
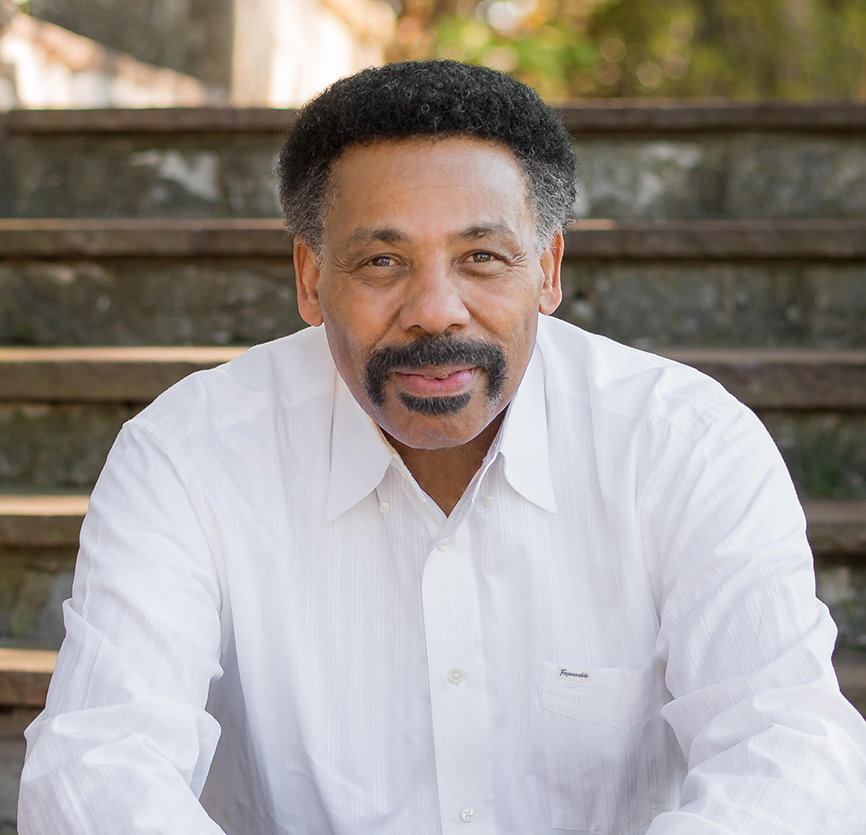
- Pastor Evans in 2014.
- Born: Anthony Tyrone Evans; September 10, 1949 (age 76); Baltimore, Maryland, U.S.
- Occupations: Author, minister
- Spouse: Lois Irene Evans (m. 1970; died 2019) Carla Crummie (m. 2023)
- Children: Chrystal; Priscilla; Anthony Jr.; Jonathan

Anthony Tyrone Evans Sr. (born September 10, 1949) is an American evangelical pastor, speaker, and author. From 1976 to 2024, Evans served as senior pastor at Oak Cliff Bible Fellowship in Dallas, Texas. Evans' evangelist show airs on various radio stations across the United States on the Christian Satellite Network (CSN).

== Early life and education ==
In 1973, at the age of 24, Tony Evans was contacted by a radio show producer from Houston (KHCB). The producer contacted Dallas Theological Seminary, where Evans was a junior in the Th.M. program, requesting high-quality preaching content to include in his program for free. One of Evans' professors recommended him. Recorded in a tiny studio on the seminary campus, Evans spent the next few years faithfully preaching into a microphone for a crowd unseen in Houston.

Nearly a decade later, The Urban Alternative was formed in 1981 when requests for Dr. Evans' sermons came in so frequently from his Houston and Dallas radio broadcasts that Lois Evans, co-founder of the ministry, began fulfilling orders. Lois Evans utilized her business skills to organize, develop, and expand the ministry's outreach and growth.

In 1986, Evans was invited to preach at the National Religious Broadcasters annual conference. This drew enormous attention and encouragement to expand the ministry.

Not too long after that appearance at NRB, radio stations began to air Evans' program. Under the leadership of Lois Evans, Senior Vice President of TUA, the radio ministry expanded both nationally and internationally. The reach of Evans' preaching now spans the world, with his broadcasts airing on over 1,400 radio stations and in more than 130 countries, reaching millions each week.

Evans earned a BA at Carver College in 1972, a Th.M. in 1976, and a Th.D. at Dallas Theological Seminary in 1982.

== Career ==
Evans founded the Oak Cliff Bible Fellowship in Dallas, Texas, in 1976 with 10 members meeting at his home. He also founded The Urban Alternative. This national organization seeks to restore hope and transform lives through the proclamation and the application of the Word of God. The Urban Alternative radio broadcast, "The Alternative with Dr. Tony Evans," can be heard daily on over 1,400 outlets throughout the U.S. and in more than 130 countries worldwide.

Evans has served as chaplain for the NFL's Dallas Cowboys and is a former NBA chaplain with the Dallas Mavericks.

He taught evangelism, homiletics, and black church studies at Dallas Theological Seminary, and serves on its Board of Incorporate Members.

Evans was named one of the 12 Most Effective Preachers in the English-Speaking World by Baylor University.

In 2017, Evans launched the Tony Evans Training Center, an online learning platform providing seminary-style courses to equip Christian leaders who cannot attend a seminary.

Evans holds the honor of writing and publishing the first full-Bible commentary and study Bible by an African American. He is also the author of over 100 books, including Oneness Embraced, The Kingdom Agenda, Kingdom Man, The Tony Evans Study Bible, and The Tony Evans Bible Commentary.

In June 2024, Evans resigned as senior pastor of Oak Cliff Bible Fellowship due to an undisclosed sin he committed many years ago, though he clarified that the sin was not criminal in nature.

== Personal life ==
Evans was married to Lois Irene Evans until she died in 2019. Their marriage produced four children: Chrystal, Priscilla, Anthony Jr., and Jonathan. They also have 13 grandchildren and four great-grandchildren.

His oldest child, Chrystal Hurst, is a worship leader, Christian speaker, and writer. She co-authored the book Kingdom Woman with her father. She has also written books titled She's Still There and Show Up For Your Life.

His daughter Priscilla Shirer is a New York Times Best-Selling Author, Christian speaker, and founder of Going Beyond Ministries.

His son, Anthony Jr., is a contemporary Christian musical artist. He has collaborated with Grammy Award-winning singer Kirk Franklin and was a contestant on season two of The Voice.

Evans' son Jonathan was a professional football player in the National Football League. He played fullback for the Buffalo Bills, the Washington Redskins, and the Dallas Cowboys. Jonathan is the current chaplain of the Dallas Cowboys.

Evans is a registered Republican in Texas. In 2012, he publicly criticized President Barack Obama for his support of same-sex marriage.

In September 2023, Evans, along with his children, announced his engagement to Carla Crummie. Later that year, Oak Cliff Bible Fellowship formally announced their marriage.
