= Jet Trouble =

American singer-songwriter

- Born: James E. Troublefield IV; June 11, 1996 (age 30); Dallas, Texas, US
- Origin: Dallas, Texas
- Genres: Christian; pop; R&B
- Labels: Kings Dream Entertainment; TroubleHasbun Publishing
- Spouse: Hannah Troublefield (m. 2021)

James E. Troublefield IV (born June 11, 1996), known professionally as Jet Trouble, is an American Christian singer-songwriter from Dallas.

Jet Trouble signed to the Christian hip hop label Kings Dream Entertainment in 2017. He achieved his first Billboard chart entry with the single "I Need You," which first appeared on the Hot Christian Songs chart in March 2024.

== Discography ==
=== Albums ===
List of solo albums, with selected details
Title	Details
Warren Park	Released: November 13, 2017; Label: Kings Dream Entertainment
Son of '61	Released: June 1, 2018; Label: Kings Dream Entertainment
Though None Go	Released: August 5, 2022; Label: TroubleHasbun Publishing

=== Singles ===
==== As lead artist ====
List of singles as lead artist with selected chart positions
Title	Year	Peak chart positions		Album
Title	Year	US Christ	US Christ Air	Album
"Wendy Peffercorn"	2017	—	—	Warren Park
"Look to God"	2017	—	—	Warren Park
"Youth"	2017	—	—	Warren Park
"Only One"	2018	—	—	Son of '61
"Neighborhood Kids"	2018	—	—	Son of '61
"God Dream"	2018	—	—	Son of '61
"The Proof"	2018	—	—	Non-album singles
"Problems"	2019	—	—	Non-album singles
"Save Me from Myself"	2019	—	—	Non-album singles
"Lost in Awe"	2019	—	—	Non-album singles
"God and Me"	2020	—	—	Non-album singles
"Let Us Pray"	2020	—	—	Non-album singles
"Heroes"	2021	—	—	Though None Go
"However" (featuring nobigdyl.)	2021	—	—	Though None Go
"Far Away"	2021	—	—	Though None Go
"It's Coming"	2021	—	—	Though None Go
"Where to Find Me"	2022	—	—	Though None Go
"Stubborn"	2022	—	—	Though None Go
"I Need You"	2023	27	28	Non-album singles
"Heaven Come Down"	2023	—	—	Non-album singles

==== As featured artist ====
List of singles as featured artist
Title	Year	Album
"To My Woes" Unlikely Few with Jet Trouble and McKnight	2019	Unlikely
"Rain Delay" Bdt with Ruslan and Jet Trouble	2020	Non-album single

=== Guest appearances ===
List of non-single guest appearances, showing year released and album name
Title	Other artist(s)	Year	Album
"Clock In"	Ruslan, Dom Marcel	2017	Indie Jones
"Back Against the Wall"	Ruslan, nobigdyl.	2018	Indie Jones II
"Idk"	Mogli the Iceburg	2018	Let's Talk About Our Feelings
"Want Me Back"	Eric Heron	2019	Neon: A Somewhat Adamant Sequel
"I've Got Promises"	Hyper Fenton	2023	Old Wells

== Awards and nomiantions ==
Year	Organization	Nominee / work	Category	Result	Ref.
2026	K-Love Fan Awards	"I Need You"	Breakout Single of the Year	Nominated	
