= Priscilla Shirer =

American author and motivational speaker

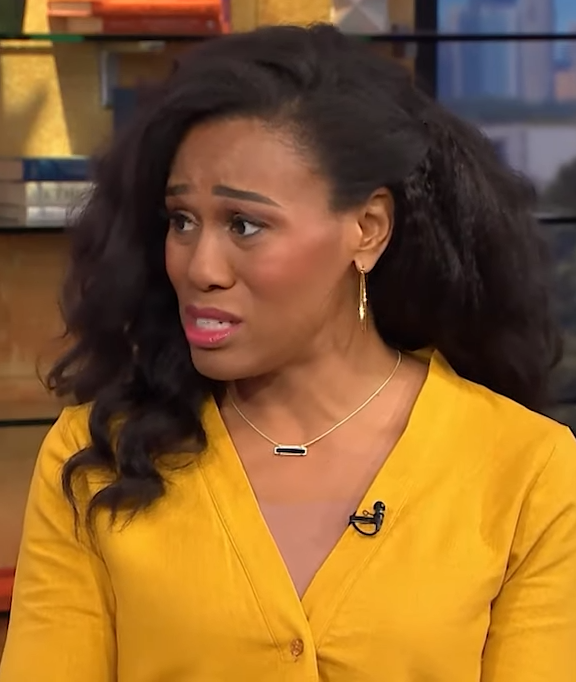
- Shirer in 2019
- Born: Priscilla Evans; December 31, 1974 (age 51); Dallas, Texas, U.S.
- Occupations: Author, minister, actress
- Relatives: Tony Evans (father); Chrystal Evans Hurst (sister); Anthony Evans (brother); Jonathan Evans (brother)
- Writing career
- Period: 20th century, 21st century
- Notable works: War Room, Overcomer, The Forge
- Website: GoingBeyond.com

Priscilla Shirer (born December 31, 1974) is an American author, motivational speaker, actress, and Christian media personality, and evangelist. Her father is Dallas mega-church pastor Tony Evans and her brothers are motivational speaker and chaplain Jonathan Evans and musician Anthony Evans.

== Biography ==
The daughter of Tony Evans, the former senior pastor of Oak Cliff Bible Fellowship in Dallas, Texas, and Lois Evans, Priscilla grew up well acquainted with the Bible. As a freshman at the University of Houston, she interned with a Christian radio station. Soon listeners were calling the station, inviting Priscilla to speak at their Bible study groups and other events. Soon she was invited to lead a weekly Bible study at the Zig Ziglar Corporation and then to join its speaker team. Priscilla has worked as an independent contractor for CBS and hosted a local television show, but recently she has focused solely on Christian ministry opportunities. She calls Anne Graham Lotz, daughter of evangelist Rev. Billy Graham, her mentor in ministry.

Together the Shirers established Going Beyond Ministries, a speaking bureau featuring Priscilla. The parents of three young boys, the Shirers share ministry and family responsibilities. While Priscilla continues to minister full-time, Jerry manages his schedule and other business aspects of Going Beyond Ministries.

Priscilla speaks around the world at churches and other events, including the LifeWay Christian Resources-sponsored Going Beyond conference and Deeper Still: The Event, where she shares the stage with Beth Moore and Kay Arthur. She has also authored several books.

Shirer graduated from Duncanville High School and Dallas Theological Seminary, earning a master's degree from the latter in Biblical Studies.

In 1993, Shirer was a freshman at the University of Houston. Shirer was married in 1999 to Jerry Shirer, former Hilton Hotels executive. The couple has three sons.

In 2013, Shirer was a speaker at the 2013 Women of Faith conference. In 2015, Shirer made her film debut in the Kendrick Brothers film War Room. In October 2016, Shirer was recognized as one of four prominent women of faith during the 10th anniversary of God's Leading Ladies Life Enrichment Program at The Potter's House. Shirer also featured at the 47th GMA Dove Awards.

== Bibliography ==
- "Fervent; A Woman's Battle Plan for Serious, Specific and Strategic Prayer", ISBN 978-1-4336-8867-6
- He Speaks to Me: Preparing to Hear from God, ISBN 978-0-8024-5007-4
- Discerning the Voice of God: How to Recognize When God Speaks, ISBN 978-0-8024-5009-8
- And We Are Changed: Encounters with a Transforming God, ISBN 978-0-8024-3311-4
- A Jewel in His Crown: Rediscovering Your Value as a Woman of Excellence, ISBN 978-0-8024-4083-9
- The Resolution for Women, ISBN 978-1-4336-7401-3
- The Armor of God, ISBN 978-1-0877-6945-5

== Filmography ==
- War Room (2015), as Elizabeth Jordan
- I Can Only Imagine (2018), as Mrs. Fincher, Bart Millard's teacher
- Overcomer (2019), as Principal Olivia Brooks, mentor to Hannah Scott
- The Forge (2024), as Cynthia and Elizabeth, identical twin sisters
