= Lisa Harper =

Christian author, speaker and bible educator

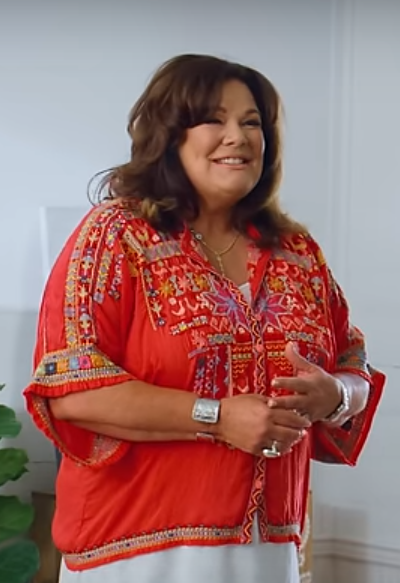
- Harper in 2023
- Born: 1963 (age 62–63)
- Education: Covenant Seminary (MTS), Denver Seminary (DMin)
- Occupations: Author; bible educator; speaker
- Known for: Christian women’s conferences
- Children: 1

Lisa Harper (born 1963) is a Christian author, bible educator, and speaker. She has written books and bible education study curricula, organized Christian women's conferences, and since 2022 hosted the podcast Back Porch Theology.

== Early life and education ==
Harper is a native of Central Florida. She earned a Master of Theological Studies from Covenant Seminary and a Doctor of Ministry from Denver Seminary.

== Career ==
Harper served six years as the director of Women's Outreach at Focus on the Family, where she developed the "Renewing the Heart" conferences attended by 150,000-200,000 women in the late 1990s. She speaks at large multi-denominational events and at churches all over the world. Through biblical teachings and workshops, she reassures women that they are not alone and provides a safe space for them to be open about their struggles balancing their daily and spiritual lives.

For ten years, she toured with "Women of Faith," sharing messages of God's unconditional love with over a million women. Throughout her ministry, she recognized the need for women of all ages to be encouraged, strengthened in their faith, and to receive a clear presentation of the Gospel of Jesus Christ. She was executive producer on Renewing the Heart Live Albums which generated several No. 1 Christian radio singles and has made appearances on the Trinity Broadcasting Network.

She has produced Bible study video curriculums which provide historical background and utilize pop-culture references to help people connect with biblical stories and figures. Examples of these include ones for Hebrews, Old Testament Minor Prophets, the Song of Solomon and Job. She has also authored books which have been described as spiritually introspective life-lessons, using humor, personal anecdotes, and her storytelling ability to encourage readers to seek an intimate connection with God. Her podcast ‘’Back Porch Theology’’ was nominated for three consecutive years for the K-Love Podcast of the Year Fan Award. Harper hosts the podcast with actress and author Allison Allen and Denver Seminary Professor Jim Howard.

== Selected works ==
=== Bible study guides ===
- Tough Love, Tender Mercies: Three Short Stops in the Minor Prophets. Tyndale House Publishers. 2005. ISBN 978-1-4143-0277-5.
- What Every Girl Wants: A Portrait of Perfect Love & Intimacy in the Song of Solomon. Tyndale House Publishers. 2006. ISBN 978-1-4143-0278-2.
- Hebrews: The Nearness of King Jesus. LifeWay Christian Resources. 2014. ISBN 978-1-4300-2559-7.
- Job: A Story of Unlikely Joy. LifeWay Christian Resources. 2018. ISBN 978-1-5359-2979-0.
- How Much More: Discovering God's Extravagant Love in Unexpected Places. LifeWay Christian Resources. 2022. ISBN 978-1-0877-7394-0.

=== Books ===
- Every Woman's Hope: Defined by Grace, Beloved by God. Howard Books. 2001. ISBN 1-58229-190-X.
- A Perfect Mess: Why You Don't Have to Worry About Being Good Enough for God. WaterBrook Press. 2009. ISBN 978-1-4000-7479-2.
- Stumbling Into Grace: Confessions of a Sometimes Spiritually Clumsy Woman. Thomas Nelson. 2011. ISBN 978-0-8499-4648-6.
- Believing Jesus: A Journey Through the Book of Acts. Thomas Nelson. 2015. ISBN 978-0-7180-1120-8.
- The Sacrament of Happy: What a Smiling God Brings to a Wounded World. B&H Publishing Group. 2017. ISBN 978-1-4336-9191-1.
- Who's Your Daddy? Discovering the Awesomest Daddy Ever. B&H Publishing Group. 2018. ISBN 978-1-5359-0602-9.
- Life: An Obsessively Grateful, Undone by Jesus, Genuinely Happy, and Not Faking it Through the Hard Stuff Kind of 100-Day Devotional. B&H Publishing Group. 2021. ISBN 978-1-4336-9194-2.

== Personal life ==
Harper spent much of her adult life struggling with the shame stemming from her abusive childhood. In her forties, as a single woman, she felt a strong desire to become a mother and began exploring adoption. However, a fellow church member discouraged her, suggesting that her past experiences might negatively impact her ability to parent. As a result, she postponed the adoption process for seven years. In her late forties, she resumed her efforts, and after two unsuccessful adoption attempts, she learned about a two-and-a-half-year-old girl in Haiti named Missy who was diagnosed with HIV, cholera, tuberculosis, and severe malnutrition. She began adoption proceedings, visiting her daughter in Haiti until she was able to bring her home to Nashville in April 2014.
