= Ain't No Way (Jamie MacDonald song) =

Single by Jamie MacDonald

from the album Jamie MacDonald
- Released: January 23, 2026
- Genre: Pop
- Length: 2:50
- Label: Capitol; Capitol CMG; Universal
- Songwriters: Austin Davis; Colby Wedgeworth; Jamie MacDonald; Jonathan Gamble
- Producers: Davis; Wedgeworth

Jamie MacDonald singles chronology
"Left It in the River" (2025)	"Ain't No Way" (2026)	"Roots" (2026)

Music videos
- "Ain't No Way" (lyrics) on YouTube
- "Ain't No Way" (studio session) on YouTube

"Ain't No Way" is a song recorded by the American contemporary Christian musician Jamie MacDonald. The song was released on January 23, 2026, via Capitol Christian Music Group, as a track on MacDonald's self-titled debut album, before later being released to Christian radio on March 9, 2026 as the album's third. "Ain't No Way" was written by MacDonald alongside Austin Davis, Colby Wedgeworth, and Jonathan Gamble, while Davis and Wedgeworth produced.

== Writing and development ==
"Ain't No Way" is primarily a pop song, containing jazz, gospel, and R&B influences. The track contains heavily piano-driven instrumentation and the melody is supported with a backing gospel choir. Lyrically, the song "looks back at MacDonald's history with the Lord as the burgeoning songstress recalls all the moments He's made the impossible possible in her life". The "uplifting anthem" is thematically about "trusting God to make a way through life's impossible moments" and contains a "message of hope, redemption, and the reminder that nothing is impossible for God". MacDonald spoke on the meaning behind "Ain't No Way", remarking:

I wrote this song because every time I've faced something impossible, God showed up. Every battle I've faced has only made me more confident in Him. There's truly no way He's gonna let me down. This song is my heart speaking back to every impossible moment. He always makes a way, and He is faithful through it all.

Running for a time of two minutes and 50 seconds, the track is composed in the key of C, with a speed of 98 beats per minute and a time signature of 4/4.

== Release ==
"Ain't No Way" was first released on January 23, 2026, through Capitol CMG, to CD, LP, digital download, and streaming formats, as the fifth track on MacDonald's debut album, Jamie MacDonald. On March 9, 2026, the song was released through Capitol Records and Universal Music Group to Christian radio in Australia, New Zealand, and the United States, as the third and final single from the parent album, but had already begun impacting Australian and American Christian radio before that point. An official lyric video was released and uploaded to YouTube on April 16, 2026, in promotion of the song, and on May 14, 2026, a "studio session" remix of the song was released as a music video to YouTube.

== Commercial performance ==
"Ain't No Way" first appeared on the Today's Christian Music Australian Christian Airplay chart on March 8, 2026, debuting at number 29. In the United States, the track entered the Billboard Christian Airplay chart at number 40, and the following week entered the Billboard Christian Adult Contemporary chart at number 29. On April 4, it appeared on the overall Hot Christian Songs chart at number 49. On June 12, "Ain't No Way" reached number 1 on the Australian Christian Airplay chart, becoming MacDonald's first leader in the country. On July 19, it reached its peak position of number 11 on the Hot Christian Songs. On August 8, "Ain't No Way" reached the top position on the Christian Airplay chart, becoming the third consecutive leader from Jamie MacDonald. The following week, it reached its peak of number 3 on the Christian Adult Contemporary chart.

== Personnel ==
Credits adapted from Apple Music.

- Austin Davis – writer, producer
- Colby Wedgeworth – writer, producer
- Jamie MacDonald – vocals, writer
- Jonathan Gamble – writer
- Josh Groppel – mixing

== Charts ==
Chart performance for "Ain't No Way"
Chart (2026)	Peak position
Australia Christian Airplay (TCM)	1
New Zealand Airplay (Radioscope)	23
US Christian Adult Contemporary (Billboard)	3
US Christian Airplay (Billboard)	1
US Hot Christian Songs (Billboard)	11

== Release history ==
Release history for "Ain't No Way"
Region	Date	Format	Label	Ref.
Various	January 23, 2026	CD; LP; digital download; streaming; (with Jamie MacDonald)	Capitol CMG	(Note: Release formats for Jamie MacDonald: CD: LP: Digital download: Streaming:)
Australia	March 9, 2026	Christian radio	Capitol; Universal	
New Zealand	March 9, 2026	Christian radio	Capitol; Universal	
United States	March 9, 2026	Christian radio	Capitol; Universal	
