= Jon Reddick =

- Origin: Memphis, Tennessee
- Genres: Pop; rock; worship; Christian/gospel
- Years active: 2019–present
- Label: Gotee Records
- Website: jonreddickmusic.com

Jon Reddick is an American contemporary Christian musician and pastor from Memphis, Tennessee.

== Career ==
=== God, Turn It Around (2019–2022) ===
Reddick released his debut single, "You Keep Hope Alive", on April 26, 2019. He later released a version of the song featuring Mandisa. The song peaked at No. 17 on the Billboard Hot Christian Songs chart. On October 11 of that year, he released "God, Turn It Around", which hit No. 4 on Hot Christian Songs. In 2022, "God, Turn It Around" received several award nominations, including Worship Recorded Song of the Year at the GMA Dove Awards and Breakout Single of the Year at the K-Love Fan Awards.

On May 18, 2022, Reddick released his debut studio album, God, Turn It Around, through Gotee Records.

=== No Fear (2023–present) ===
On January 9, 2023, Reddick released "I Believe It (The Life of Jesus)". In 2023, the song was nominated for several awards, including Worship Song of the Year at the K-Love Fan Awards and Contemporary Song of the Year at the NRT We Love Awards, and in 2024, it was nominated for Song of the Year at the GMA Dove Awards. The song went on to hit No. 2 on the Billboard Hot Christian Songs chart. The following single, "Don't Fight Alone", was released on November 10, 2023, charting at No. 43 on the Hot Christian Songs chart.

In 2023, Reddick was nominated for New Artist of the Year at the GMA Dove Awards. That year, he also appeared TobyMac's Hits Deep Tour.

On January 13, 2025, he released the song "No Fear", scoring his first No. 1 hit on Christian Airplay, while also peaking at No. 11 on the Hot Christian Songs. It remained at No. 1 on the Christian Airplay for 10 consecutive weeks, tying it with "That's Who I Praise" by Brandon Lake and "I Thank God" by JWLKRS Worship and Housefires as the longest time spent at No. 1 on that chart in the 2020s. The song served as the title track for Reddick's second studio album, No Fear, which was released on May 30, 2025, through Gotee Records.

== Discography ==
=== Albums ===
Title	Details	Peak chart positions
Title	Details	US Christ
God, Turn It Around	Released: March 18, 2022; Label: Gotee Records; Formats: Digital download, streaming	—
No Fear	Released: May 30, 2025; Label: Gotee Records; Formats: CD, digital download, streaming	29

=== Singles ===
Title	Year	Peak chart positions					Certifications	Album
Title	Year	US Christ	US Christ Air	US Christ AC	US Christ Digital	US Christ Stream	Certifications	Album
"You Keep Hope Alive" (solo or with Mandisa)	2019	17	12	13	—	—		God, Turn It Around
"God, Turn It Around"	2019	4	4	6	11	20	RIAA: Gold	God, Turn It Around
"Glory and Majesty"	2020	—	—	—	—	—		God, Turn It Around
"Keep Me Near"	2020	—	—	—	—	—		God, Turn It Around
"The Power of Your Name" (with Matt Redman)	2020	—	—	—	—	—		God, Turn It Around
"In the Room"	2021	—	—	—	—	—		God, Turn It Around
"I Believe It (The Life of Jesus)"	2023	2	3	3	16	5	RIAA: Gold	No Fear
"Don't Fight Alone"	2023	43	23	23	—	—		No Fear
"Trample" (with Kim Walker-Smith)	2024	—	—	—	—	—		Non-album single
"Yield"	2024	—	—	—	—	—		No Fear
"No Fear"	2025	7	1	1	3	—		No Fear
"What a Love"	2025	—	—	—	—	—		No Fear
"The Way"	2025	29	11	10	—	—		No Fear
"Winter Wonderland"	2025	—	—	—	—	—		Non-album single
"Just as I Am" (with Tommee Profitt)	2026	—	—	—	—	—		The Resurrection of a King
"Calvary" (with Janice Gaines)	2026	—	—	—	—	—		Non-album singles
"Holding On (Praise God)"	2026	8	1	1	—	—		Non-album singles
"I Choose You"	2026	—	—	—	—	—		Non-album singles
"King of Heaven"	2026	—	—	—	—	—		Non-album singles
"—" denotes a recording that did not chart or was not released in that territory.

== Awards and nominations ==
=== GMA Dove Awards ===
Year	Nominee/work	Category	Result	Ref.
2022	"God, Turn It Around"	Worship Recorded Song of the Year	Nominated	
2023	Jon Reddick	New Artist of the Year	Nominated	
2024	"I Believe It (The Life of Jesus)"	Song of the Year	Nominated	
2025	"No Fear"	Short Form Music Video of the Year (Performance)	Nominated	
2026	"No Fear"	Song of the Year	Pending	

=== K-Love Fan Awards ===
Year	Nominee / work	Category	Result	Ref.
2022	"God, Turn It Around"	Breakout Single of the Year	Nominated	
2023	"I Believe It (The Life of Jesus)"	Worship Song of the Year	Nominated	
2026	"No Fear"	Song of the Year	Nominated	
2026	Himself	Male Artist of the Year	Nominated	

=== We Love Awards ===
Year	Nominee / work	Category	Result	Ref.
2023	"I Believe It (The Life of Jesus)"	Contemporary Song of the Year	Nominated	
2025	"No Fear"	Song of the Year	Nominated	
2025	"No Fear"	Contemporary Song of the Year	Nominated	
