= Terrian =

American contemporary Christian music & gospel singer

- Born: Terrian Bass Woods; September 2, 1996 (age 30); Memphis, Tennessee, U.S.
- Occupations: Singer; songwriter
- Years active: 2017–present
- Spouse: Ian Woods
- Musical career
- Genres: Contemporary Christian music; gospel; worship
- Instrument: Vocals
- Label: Gotee
- Website: iamterrian.com

Terrian Bass Woods is an American contemporary Christian music singer and songwriter. She is known for her role as a vocalist in TobyMac's band, Diverse City.

== Career ==
Terrian was a contestant on the 15th season of American Idol, reaching the latter Hollywood rounds before her elimination.

Terrian released her debut song, "God With Us", in 2019. The music video has since surpassed six million views on YouTube. It was followed by "In The Arms", co-written by Terrian and Anthony Skinner, Jon Reddick and songwriter Jess Cates, and was produced by Micah Kuiper and Bryan Fowler. She was also featured on TobyMac's remix album The St. Nemele Collab Sessions on the track, "It's You (Tide Electric Remix)" with Matt Maher. In addition, Terrian joined Cochren & Co. on the "TobyMac Theatre Tour".

Her third lead single, "Let Love Lead", was released on February 14, 2020. Followed by "You Still Do" on May 15, 2020.

She released her first EP, Genesis of Terrian, in 2021.

She released her first album, Give It Time, in 2024.

== Personal life ==
Terrian married on September 17, 2018 to Ian Woods.

She serves on AngelStreet Staff as a mentor to young girls and advocates for the nonprofit organization.

== Discography ==
=== Studio albums ===
List of studio albums, with selected chart positions
Title	EP details
Give it Time	Released: February 26, 2024; Label: Gotee; Format: Digital download, streaming
Mad Big World	Released: August 21, 2026; Label: Gotee; Format: Digital download, streaming

=== Extended plays ===
List of extended plays, with selected chart positions
Title	EP details
Genesis of Terrian	Released: February 26, 2021; Label: Gotee; Format: CD, digital download, streaming

=== Singles ===
==== As lead artist ====
List of singles, with selected chart positions
Year	Title	Peak positions					Album
Year	Title	US Digital	US Christ.	US Christ. Air.	US Christ. AC	US Christ. Digital	Album
2016	"I Am Free"	—	—	—	—	—	Non-album singles
2019	"God With Us"	—	50	36	—	—	Non-album singles
2019	"In the Arms"	—	31	20	27	—	Non-album singles
2020	"Let Love Lead"	—	—	—	—	—	Non-album singles
2020	"You Still Do"	—	—	—	—	—	Non-album singles
2020	"I'm in Love" (featuring Ian Alxndr)	—	—	—	—	—	Genesis of Terrian (EP)
2020	"Light It Up"	—	—	40	— (Note: "Light It Up" did not enter the Christian AC, but peaked at No. 1 on the Christian Hot AC/CHR National Airplay chart.)	—	Genesis of Terrian (EP)
2021	"Wake Up"	—	—	—	—	—	Non-album single
2024	"Honestly We Just Need Jesus"	—	11	8	8	—	Give It Time
2024	"Worry About Nothing"	—	—	—	—	—	Non-album single
2024	"Matthew 5"	—	—	—	—	—	Give It Time
2024	"Brand New"	—	—	—	—	—	Non-album singles
2024	"No Body"	—	—	—	—	—	Non-album singles
2025	"Testimony" (original or with CeCe Winans)	20	18	18	14	2	Mad Big World
2025	"Lovin' You" (with Ian Alxndr)	—	—	—	—	—	Non-album singles
2025	"Jesus Is Love"	—	—	—	—	—	Non-album singles
2026	"Oasis of Hope" (with Madison Ryann Ward)	—	—	—	—	—	Mad Big World
2026	"King of Kings" (with Eli Soares)	—	—	—	—	—	Mad Big World
2026	"You Remain"	—	47	22	30	—	Mad Big World
2026	"Walking With My God" (with Lin D)	—	—	—	—	—	Mad Big World
2026	"Mad Big World"	—	—	—	—	—	Mad Big World
"—" denotes a recording that did not chart or was not released in that territory.

==== As featured artist ====
List of featured singles, with selected chart positions, showing year released and album name
Year	Title	Peak positions				Album
Year	Title	US Christ.	US Christ. Airplay	US Christ. AC	US Holiday Dig.	Album
2019	"All I Need for Christmas" (tobyMac featuring Terrian)"	30	24	8	39	Non-album singles
2020	"Only U" (Aaron Cole featuring Terrian)	—	32	—	—	Non-album singles
2020	"Hope is Here (Do Not Fear)" (Building 429 featuring Terrian)	—	40	20	—	Non-album singles
"—" denotes a recording that did not chart or was not released in that territory.
