= Nothing but the Blood of Jesus =

Traditional American hymn by Robert Lowry

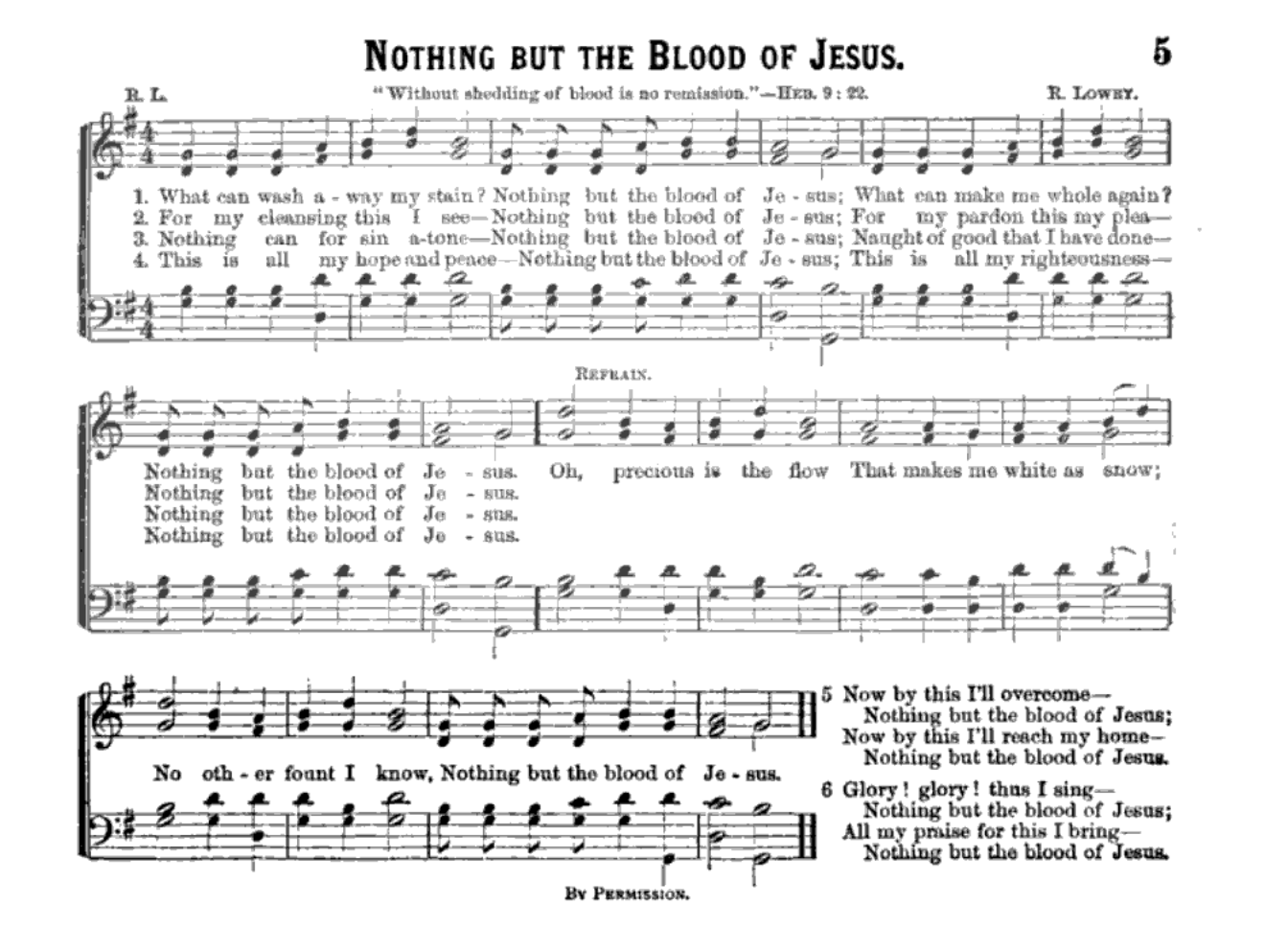
"Nothing but the blood of Jesus" lyrics and music from 1877 Welcome Tidings: A New Collection of Sacred Songs by Robert Lowry

"Nothing But The Blood of Jesus" is a traditional American hymn about the blood atonement and propitiation for sin by the death of Jesus as explained in Hebrews 9.

== History ==
The song was composed by Robert Lowry, a hymn writer who was a Baptist minister and professor at Bucknell University.

The song was written in 1876 and first popularized at a camp meeting in Ocean Grove, New Jersey. The song has been covered by many notable musicians including Randy Travis and Carrie Underwood. The song was later covered and remixed by Forrest Frank in his New Hymns album.

== Lyrics ==
1. What can wash away my sin?
Nothing but the Blood of Jesus
What can make me whole again?
Nothing but the Blood of Jesus.

Chorus:
O precious is the flow
That makes me white as snow
No other fount I know
Nothing but the Blood of Jesus
Nothing but the Blood of Jesus.

2. For my cleansing this I see
Nothing but the Blood of Jesus
For my pardon this my plea
Nothing but the Blood of Jesus.

3. Nothing can for sin atone
Nothing but the Blood of Jesus
Naught of good that I have done
Nothing but the Blood of Jesus.

4. This is all my hope and peace
Nothing but the Blood of Jesus
This is all my righteousness
Nothing but the Blood of Jesus.

5. Now by this I'll overcome
Nothing but the Blood of Jesus
Now by this, I'll reach my home
Nothing but the Blood of Jesus.

6. Glory! glory! thus I sing
Nothing but the Blood of Jesus
All my praise to this I bring
Nothing but the Blood of Jesus.

Verses 5 and 6 are less commonly used, appended to the first four.
