= Anthony Evans (singer) =

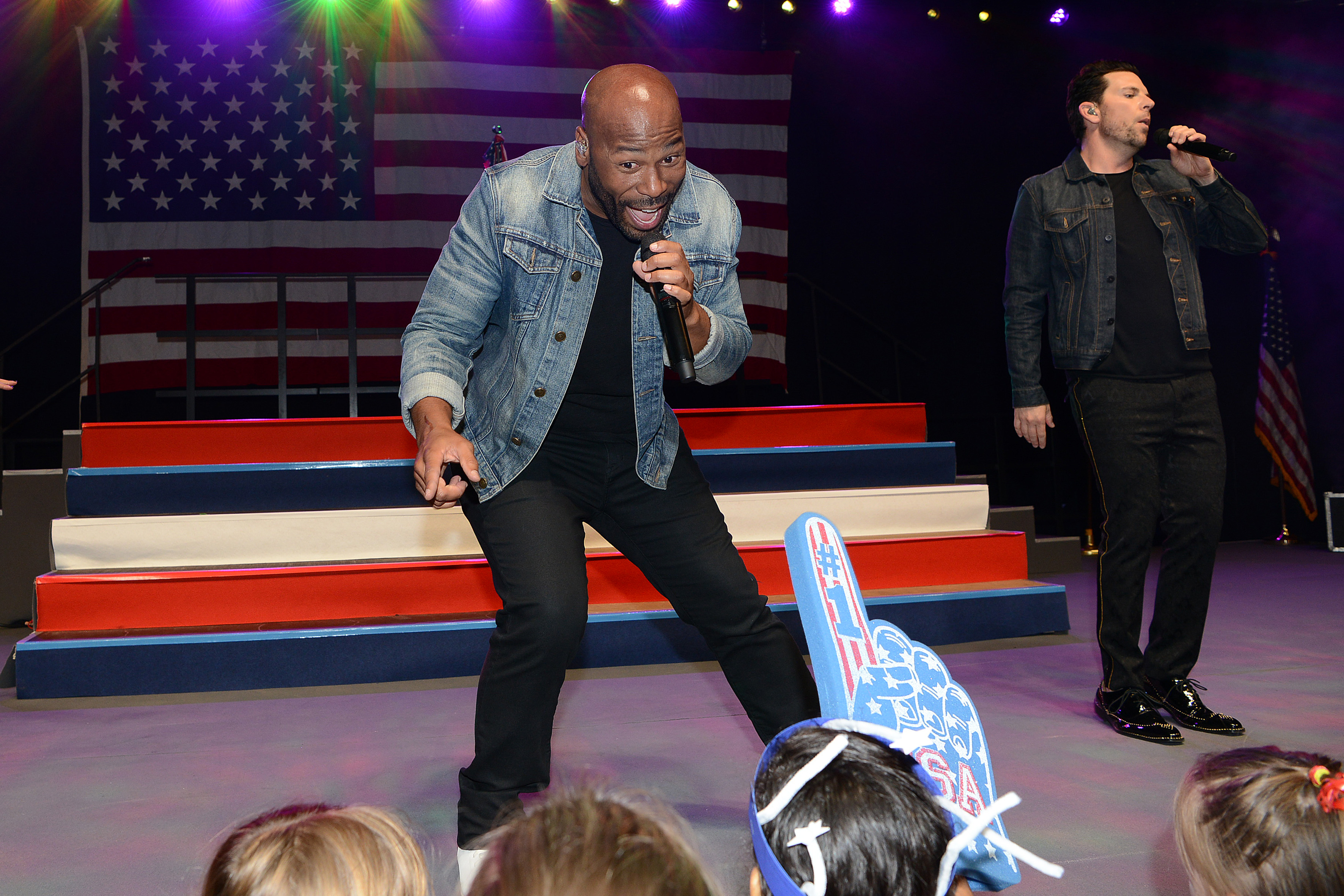
- Evans performing in Berlin in July 2019

Background information
- Birth name: Anthony Tyrone Evans, Jr.
- Born: July 14, 1978 (age 47); Dallas, Texas
- Genres: Contemporary Christian music, urban gospel, worship
- Occupation: Singer-songwriter
- Instrument: Vocals
- Years active: 2004–present
- Labels: Epic, Integrity, EMI Gospel, Fair Trade
- Website: anthony-evans.com

Anthony Tyrone Evans Jr. (born July 14, 1978) is an American Christian singer and songwriter. Evans has made six studio albums during his career as a musician: Even More in 2004 with Epic Records, Letting Go in 2006 with Integrity Music, The Bridge in 2006 with EMI Gospel, Undisguised in 2010 with INO Records, Home in 2011 with Fair Trade Services, and Real Life/Real Worship in 2014 with Fair Trade Services. In 2018, Evans played the Beast in Beauty and the Beast.

In 2012, Evans made it onto The Voice during season two on Team Aguilera, but was eliminated after the battle rounds on March 5, 2012.

== Background ==
Evans was born on July 14, 1978, in Dallas, Texas. He is the son of Dr. Tony Evans and Lois Evans. His father, a Christian radio personality, was senior pastor at the megachurch Oak Cliff Bible Fellowship in Dallas until June 2024. He has one brother – Jonathan – and two sisters: Chrystal and Priscilla, the latter a best-selling author. Evans graduated from Liberty University. Evans starred in Caged No More, a Christian faith-based film about sex trafficking. In 2018 he performed live at the Independence Day reception of the U.S. Embassy Berlin in Germany.

== Music career ==
On June 8, 2004, Evans released his debut studio album entitled Even More with the record label Epic Records. The follow-up second studio album was released on March 7, 2006, titled Letting Go with Integrity Music. His third studio album would come out on June 10, 2008, entitled The Bridge that was released under the EMI Gospel label. On October 2, 2009, Evans released his first ever Holiday album with INO called What Christmas Means. The fourth studio album by Evans was titled Undisguised, which came out on January 26, 2010, with INO Records that later became Fair Trade Services. Evans released his fifth studio album on November 15, 2011, titled Home through Fair Trade Services.

=== The Voice ===
Evans appeared on the second season of NBC's The Voice. In the blind audition broadcast on February 20, 2012, he sang "What's Going On" from Marvin Gaye. Only Christina Aguilera turned her chair during the blind audition, with the other three (Adam Levine, CeeLo Green and Blake Shelton) abstaining. On Team Aguilera as a default, he was put in the Battles round against another Aguilera contestant, Jesse Campbell. On an episode broadcast on March 5, they both sang the Alicia Keys song "If I Ain't Got You", with Aguilera opting to keep Campbell after an epic musical confrontation. The show hadn't installed the "steal option" for other judges yet, so Evans was eliminated from the show.

=== Real Life/Real Worship ===
After The Voice, Evans released his sixth studio album on April 8, 2014, called Real Life/Real Worship with Fair Trade Services. It proved to be commercially his most successful album release. The album charted on the Billboard on the week of April 26, 2014, at number 60 most sold album in all the United States by the Billboard Hot 200. The album made it also to number 4 on the Top Christian Album chart the same week. In addition, the album reached number 2 on the most sold Top Gospel Albums chart.

== Discography ==
=== Studio albums ===
List of studio albums, with selected chart positions
Title	Album details	Peak chart positions			
Title	Album details	US 200	US Christian	US Gospel	US Heat
Even More	Released: June 8, 2004; Label: Epic Records; Formats: CD, digital download	–	–	17	–
Letting Go	Released: March 7, 2006; Label: Integrity Music; Formats: CD, digital download	–	42	14	–
The Bridge	Released: June 10, 2008; Label: EMI Gospel; Formats: CD, digital download	–	–	24	–
Undisguised	Released: January 26, 2010; Label: INO; Formats: CD, digital download	–	21	–	14
Home	Released: November 15, 2011; Label: Fair Trade; Formats: CD, digital download	–	–	23	46
Real Life/Real Worship	Released: April 8, 2014; Label: Fair Trade; CD, digital download	60	4	2	–
Back to Life	Released: February 3, 2017; Label: Sherman James Productions; CD, Digital download	–	–	–	–
Altared	Released: May 17, 2019; Label: Independent; CD, digital download	–	–	–	–

=== Holiday albums ===
List of holiday albums, with selected chart positions
Title	Album details	Peak chart positions	
Title	Album details	US Gospel	US Holiday
What Christmas Means	Released: October 2, 2009; Label: INO; Formats: CD, digital download	33	35
