= Jamie MacDonald (singer) =

American contemporary Christian pop singer

- Born: Jamie Lyn MacDonald; October 17, 1984; Nashville, Tennessee, U.S
- Origin: Caro, Michigan, U.S.
- Genres: Christian; folk; soul
- Occupations: Singer; songwriter
- Works: Discography
- Years active: 2014–present
- Labels: Capitol; Capitol CMG; Universal
- Website: jamiemacdonaldmusic.com

Jamie Lyn MacDonald (born October 17, 1984) is an American singer-songwriter and film music writer primarily active within the genre of contemporary Christian and soul music. Originally from Caro, Michigan, and now based in Nashville, Tennessee, MacDonald began her music career independently in 2014; she later gained prominence in 2025 following a signing with Capitol Christian Music Group and subsequent release of the singles "Desperate", "Left It in the River", and "Ain't No Way", each of which went on to experience chart-topping success on the Billboard Christian Airplay and Christian Adult Contemporary Airplay charts. Her self-titled debut album was released in early 2026, and that year she received the Dove Award for New Artist of the Year as well as being recognized as an "Artist to Watch" by both Amazon and Spotify.

== Life and career ==
=== Early life (1984–2013) ===
MacDonald's father Jim was a professional boxer who challenged for the world light heavyweight championship three times. Her mother and father divorced while she was young. When she was 15, her stepfather forced her out of the house for singing. In her teenage years, she became addicted to drugs, and when she was 16, she dropped out of high school at Caro High School. She moved to Los Angeles, California, and enduredhomelessness. While in her early 20s, she saw many of her friends suffering from drug overdoses, participating in gang violence, or being sent to prison; she decided that she was "tired of that life", prompting her to become a Christian and participate in prison ministry. MacDonald had a "lifelong dream" of becoming a musician; however, when she was young, she did not pursue the dream because of her stepfather's discouragement.

=== Early career (2014–2023) ===
After becoming a Christian, MacDonald moved to Kansas City, Missouri, and wrote songs for International House of Prayer. She worked as a singer performing in local coffee shops, and at one performance, was encouraged by an employer to pursue her music career. She recorded independent folk music under the stage name Jamie Lyn, which attracted attention from film and television developers, who signed her with licensing deals to write music for shows, such as ABC's The Rookie, Oprah Winfrey's Queen Sugar, and ESPN's College Football Playoffs. In 2019, she was offered a record deal, but declined. Before beginning her solo career, MacDonald also contributed background vocals to various musicians, such as Anne Wilson, Zach Williams, and Danny Gokey. During the COVID-19 pandemic, she moved to Atlanta, Georgia, to be with her father while he struggled with Parkinson's disease and dementia. He died in 2023.

=== Signing with Capitol CMG and Jamie MacDonald (2024–present) ===
In November 2024, it was announced that MacDonald had signed with Capitol CMG. On November 15, 2024, she released "A Million Chances", her first release to be made on the label. The following single, "Desperate", was released on January 3, 2025. The song earned MacDonald her first chart entry, going on to peak at No. 10 on the Hot Christian Songs chart and No. 3 on the Christian Airplay chart. On July 11, 2025, a rendition of the song was released featuring Lauren Daigle. "Desperate" garnered MacDonald five award nominations, including Song of the Year and Breakout Single of the Year at the K-Love Fan Awards, Pop/Contemporary Song of the Year at the GMA Dove Awards, and Song of the Year and Collaboration of the Year at the We Love Awards.

A follow-up to "Desperate", "Who He Is", was released on March 21, 2025. On July 18, 2025, MacDonald released, "Left It in the River". The song became a commercial success, reaching No. 5 on the Hot Christian Songs chart, and going on to lead the Christian Airplay, Christian Adult Contemporary, and Christian Digital Song Sales charts. Alongside the release of "You Can't Take My Song" on October 24, 2025, MacDonald announced her debut studio album, Jamie MacDonald, which would be released on January 23, 2026.

In November 2025, MacDonald toured as a supporting act on Benjamin Hastings' 'At the Heart of It' tour, and in December 2025 she toured with Chris Tomlin on his Christmas With Chris Tomlin Tour. She completed 2025 having been nominated for New Artist / Group of the Year at the We love Awards and Breakout Artist of Momentum at the CMB Awards. She was awarded by Spotify as the Artist to Watch in 2026. In February 2026 she embarked as a headliner on the Left it in the River Tour with Taylor Hill; the tour was later extended into autumn 2026. She appeared as a featured act on Tauren Wells' Take It All Back Tour in March 2026 and Phil Wickham's Song of the Saints Tour from March until May 2026. On March 9, 2026, MacDonald released a track from Jamie MacDonald, "Ain't No Way" as a single, and two days later she released "Everything I Do (I Do It For You)", a cover of the eponymously named song by Bryan Adams, as the first of The Recording Academy's "ReImagined" series.

== Musical style ==
MacDonald has named some of her major music influences to be Lauryn Hill, Mariah Carey, and Whitney Houston. Her style contains elements from soul music, while her primary genre is classified as Christian music. Her songwriting style has been described as "honest, hopeful, and deeply vulnerable."

== Discography ==
- Jamie MacDonald (2026)

== Tours ==
=== As headliner ===
- Left It in the River Tour (with Taylor Hill, 2026)

=== As supporting act ===
- Counting My Blessings Tour (with Seph Schlueter, 2025)
- At the Heart of It Tour (with Benjamin William Hastings, 2025)
- Christmas With Chris Tomlin (with Chris Tomlin, 2025)
- Take It All Back Tour (with Tauren Wells and Gio., 2026)
- Song of the Saints Tour (with Phil Wickham and Tauren Wells, 2026)

== Awards and nominations ==
=== Amazon Music Awards ===
Year	Nominee / work	Category	Result	Ref.
2026	Herself	Artist to Watch	Won	

=== ASCAP Awards ===
Year	Nominee / work	Category	Result	Ref.
2026	"Left It in the River"	Most Performed Christian Songs	Honored	

=== CMB Awards ===
Year	Nominee / work	Category	Result	Ref.
2025	Herself	Breakout Artist for Momentum	Nominated	

=== Dove Awards ===
Year	Nominee / work	Category	Result	Ref.
2025	"Desperate"	Pop/Contemporary Recorded Song of the Year	Nominated	
2026	"Left It in the River"	Song of the Year	Nominated	
2026	Herself	New Artist of the Year	Won	
2026	"Left It in the River"	Pop/Contemporary Recorded Song of the Year	Nominated	
2026	Jamie MacDonald	Pop/Contemporary Album of the Year	Nominated	

=== Grammy Awards ===
Year	Nominee / work	Category	Result	Ref.
2027	"Left It in the River"	Best Contemporary Christian Music Performance/Song	Pending	
2027	Jamie MacDonald	Best Contemporary Christian Music Album	Pending	

=== K-Love Fan Awards ===
Year	Nominee / work	Category	Result	Ref.
2025	"Desperate"	Song of the Year	Nominated	
2025	"Desperate"	Breakout Single of the Year	Nominated	
2025	Herself	Female Artist of the Year	Nominated	
2026	"Left It in the River"	Song of the Year	Won	
2026	Herself	Artist of the Year	Nominated	
2026	Herself	Female Artist of the Year	Nominated	

=== Spotify Awards ===
Year	Nominee / work	Category	Result	Ref.
2026	Herself	Artist to Watch	Won	

=== We Love Awards ===
Year	Nominee / work	Category	Result	Ref.
2025	"Desperate"	Song of the Year	Won	
2025	"Desperate"	Collaboration of the Year	Won	
2025	Herself	New Artist / Group of the Year	Won	
