= A Million Chances =

Single by Jamie MacDonald

from the album Jamie MacDonald
- Released: October 10, 2026
- Genre: Soul
- Length: 3:21
- Label: Capitol CMG
- Songwriters: Austin Davis; Jessie Early; Jamie MacDonald
- Producer: Davis

Jamie MacDonald singles chronology
"Roots" (2026)	"A Million Chances" (2026)

Alternative cover
- Tori Kelly remix

Tori Kelly singles chronology
"Control"/"Dive" (2026)	"A Million Chances" (2026)

Music videos
- "A Million Chances" on YouTube
- "A Million Chances" (live in studio) on YouTube
- "A Million Chances" (with Tori Kelly) on YouTube

"A Million Chances" is a song recorded by the American contemporary Christian musician Jamie MacDonald. Capitol Christian Music Group initially released the song on November 15, 2024, as the first promotional single from MacDonald's self-titled debut, before being released to Christian radio in the United States on October 19, 2026, as the fourth single from the album. It marked MacDonald's first release since signing with a major label, Capitol Christian Music Group. On October 16, 2026, a version of the song featuring Tori Kelly appeared on the deluxe edition of the parent album.

"A Million Chances" was co-written by MacDonald herself alongside Austin Davis and Jessie Early, while Davis produced. It impacted Christian radio in the United States and Australia; the song charted on the Billboard Hot Christian Songs chart at number 34 and the Christian Airplay chart at number 21, as well as at number 28 on the TCM Australian Christian Airplay chart.

== Style ==
"A Million Chances" is primarily soul song, led by piano instrumentation and a backing choir. Shore Fire Media observed that, thematically, the song contains a "message of grace and second chances", explaining that "past mistakes don't define us and how faith can bring beauty from brokenness, reminding listeners that it's never too late for a new beginning." Jubilee Cast's Timothy Yap found that the song "[traces] surrender, perseverance, and redemption with clarity and grace." MacDonald spoke about the meaning behind the song, explaining:

The song 'A Million Chances', is all about the 360-miracle-turnaround that God did in my life's story. From starting out as a young girl, in and out of group homes, a high school dropout, no idea what I was doing with my life… God truly can do anything with anyone. and I just hope this song inspires you that it truly is never too late.

At a radio event in 2025, MacDonald performed "A Million Chances" and shared her testimony, which was witnessed by Kelly. Moved by MacDonald's performance, she requested to appear on a rendition of the song. MacDonald later remarked, in regards to Kelly's remix of the song:

'A Million Chances' is such a special song to me, and getting to release it with Tori Kelly feels like a dream that's bigger than I could have dreamed for myself. This song reminds me that I'm not defined by my past mistakes, and God can actually use all of that brokenness to make something so beautiful. I never could have imagined that years later I'd get to record it again with the legendary Tori Kelly, someone I've looked up to for so many years as an artist. I hope this song reminds you that no matter how many mistakes you've made, it's never too late for a new beginning.

The song is composed in the key of F, with a speed of 68 beats per minute and a time signature of 4/4.

== Release ==
On November 1, 2026, Capitol Christian Music Group announced that they had signed MacDonald to her roster, and "A Million Chances" was announced as being her scheduled debut release through the label. The track was made available for pre-save, and was released on November 15, 2024. Coinciding with the release of the song, a music video premiered to YouTube. On December 18, 2024, a live-in-studio recording of the song was released to YouTube.

"A Million Chances" was released to Christian radio in the United States and Australia on October 19, 2026, although had already begun impacting airplay before that point. On October 2, 2026, it was announced that the deluxe album of Jamie MacDonald would contain a rendition of the song featuring Kelly, and the song was made available for pre-order. It was officially released on October 16. The song appeared as one of two collaborations on the album, the other being a rendition of MacDonald's "Desperate" featuring Lauren Daigle. On October 15, 2026, a lyric video for Kelly's remix of the song was premiered to YouTube.

== Commercial performance ==
"A Million Chances" received very minimal commerial attention at the time of its initial release in 2024, but in October 2025 began experiencing some radio airplay within the United States. It was released to Christian radio a year later and, on October 17, 2026, entered the Billboard Hot Christian Songs and Christian Airplay charts, where it debuted at numbers 42 and 25, respectively. It later peaked at numbers 12 and 21 on those charts. In Australia, the song debuted at its peak position of number 28 on the TCM Australian Christian Airplay chart.

== Personnel ==
Credits adapted from Apple Music.

- Aaron Sterling – drums
- Austin Davis – percussion, guitar, writer, producer
- Bernie Herms – piano
- Cara Fox – cello
- Dan Mackenzie – editor, engineer, vocal recording engineer
- Devonne Fowlkes – background vocals
- Jamie MacDonald – vocals, writer
- Jase Keithley – mixer
- Jason Eskridge – background vocals
- Jessie Early – writer
- Kiley Phillips – background vocals
- Kristin Weber – violin
- McKendree Tucker – strings arranger
- Sam Moses – masterer
- Sean Moffitt – mixer
- Simon Lewin – engineer
- Wil Merrell – background vocals

== Charts ==
Chart performance for "A Million Chances"
Chart (2026)	Peak position
Australia Christian Airplay (TCM)	18
US Christian Adult Contemporary (Billboard)	21
US Christian Airplay (Billboard)	16
US Hot Christian Songs (Billboard)	12

== Release history ==
Release history for "A Million Chances"
Region	Date	Format	Label	Ref.
Various	November 15, 2024	Digital download; streaming	Capitol Christian Music Group	
Various	January 23, 2026	CD; LP; digital download; streaming; (with Jamie MacDonald)	Capitol Christian Music Group	(Note: Release formats for Jamie MacDonald: CD: LP: Digital download: Streaming:)
Australia	October 19, 2026	Christian radio	Capitol Christian Music Group	
United States	October 19, 2026	Christian radio	Capitol Christian Music Group	
