= Elvina M. Hall =

American songwriter (1818–1889)

- Born: Elvina Mable Reynolds; June 4, 1820; Alexandria, Virginia, U.S.
- Died: July 18, 1889 (aged 69); Ocean Grove, New Jersey, U.S.
- Resting place: Green Mount Cemetery; Baltimore, Maryland, U.S.
- Occupation: Songwriter
- Spouses: Richard Hall (died 1859) Thomas Myers (m. 1885)
- Children: 5

Elvina Mable Hall Myers (née Reynolds; June 4, 1820 – July 18, 1889) was an American songwriter who wrote the lyrics to the well-known hymn, which is now known as "Jesus Paid It All," also known as "I hear the Saviour say" (Christ All and in All).

== Early life ==
Elvina Mable Reynolds was born in Alexandria, Virginia, on June 4, 1820, to Captain David Reynolds.

== Career ==
In the spring of 1865, Hall wrote "Jesus Paid It All" "on the fly-leaf of the New Lute of Zion hymnal, in the choir of the Methodist Episcopal Church, Baltimore." Hall then shared the lyrics with her pastor who connected her with the church organist, John Grape (1835–1915), who had recently shared a new tune he had written. Hall and Grape worked to finish the hymn together, and then at the pastor's "urging, they sent the hymn to Professor Theodore Perkins, publisher of the Sabbath Carols periodical, where it received its first publication. It has been a favorite of many American Christians ever since." Hall was a church member for forty years.

== Personal life ==
She married Richard Hall of Westmoreland County, Virginia, who died in 1859. They had at least three children together that lived to adulthood, Agnes, Asenath, and Ella, and two that died as infants, Benoni and Ada. On September 8, 1885, Hall remarried Thomas Myers (1813–1894), a Methodist minister, at the home of her daughter, Ella.

Hall died in Ocean Grove, New Jersey, on July 18, 1889. Her funeral was held at Strawbridge Methodist Episcopal Church, and she was buried in the Green Mount Cemetery in Baltimore.
