= Jonathan Evans (American football) =

American football player (born 1981)

No. 45
- Position: Fullback

Personal information
- Born: October 10, 1981 (age 45); Dallas, Texas, U.S.
- Listed height: 6 ft 1 in (1.85 m)
- Listed weight: 245 lb (111 kg)

Career information
- High school: Duncanville (TX)
- College: Baylor
- NFL draft: 2005: undrafted

Career history
- Dallas Cowboys (2005)*; San Diego Chargers (2006)*; → Berlin Thunder (2006); Tennessee Titans (2007)*; Buffalo Bills (2007–2008)*; Washington Redskins (2009)*; Houston Texans (2009)*; Washington Redskins (2009)*
- * Offseason or practice squad member only

Jonathan Blake Evans (born October 10, 1981) is a former professional football player and American minister who is the lead pastor at Oak Cliff Bible Fellowship in Dallas, Texas.

Evans played for the Virginia Destroyers of the United Football League. He was signed by the Dallas Cowboys as an undrafted free agent in 2005. He played college football at Baylor.

Evans has also been a member of the San Diego Chargers, Tennessee Titans, Buffalo Bills, Houston Texans and Washington Redskins. He is the son of noted Christian author, speaker, and pastor Dr. Tony Evans.

He serves as chaplain for the Dallas Cowboys and as a motivational speaker, especially to youth. He is the son of Christian author, radio host and pastor Dr. Tony Evans.
