= Jesus Paid It All =

1865 American hymn

- Hymn by John Grape
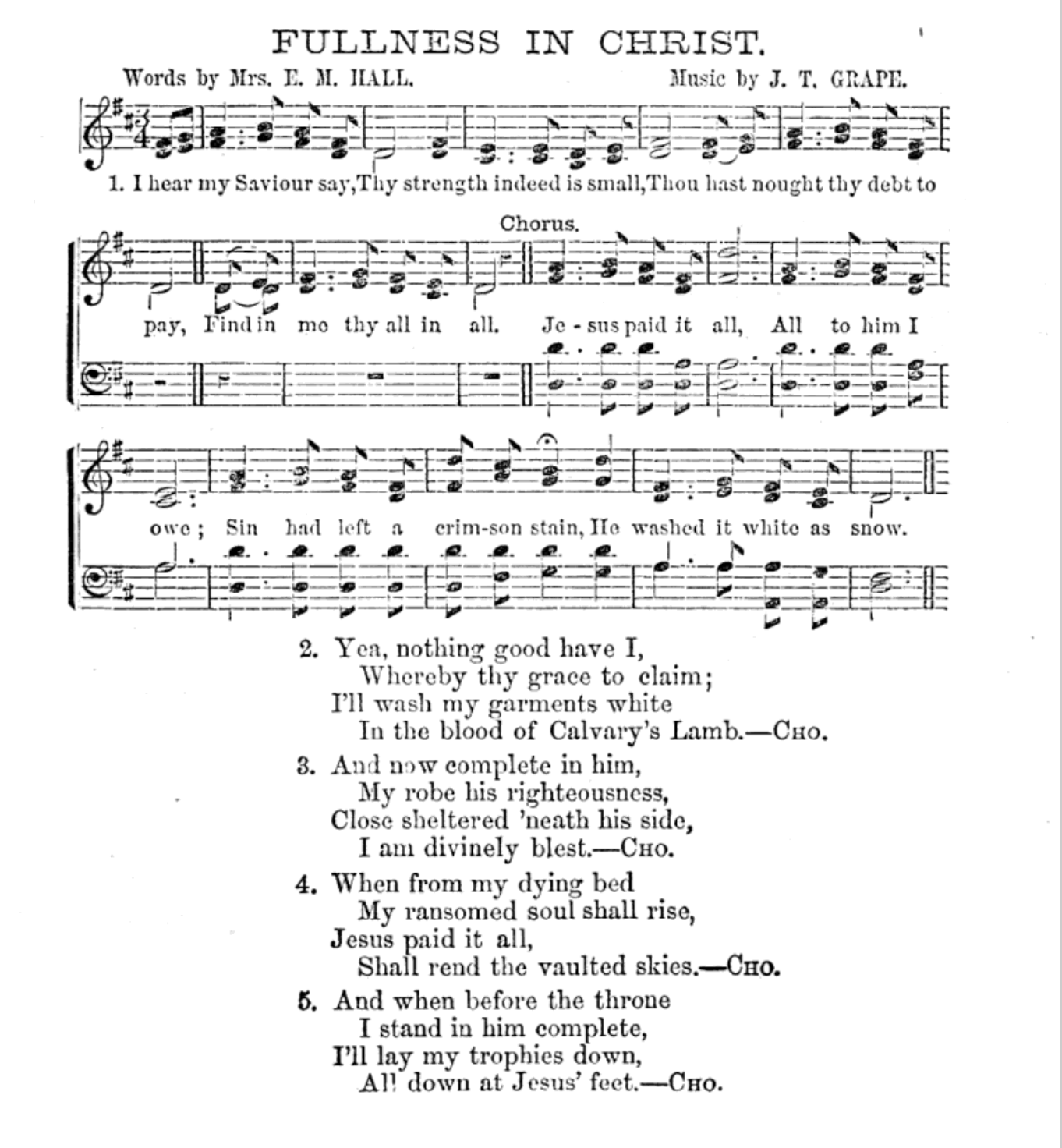
- Earlier version of "Jesus Paid It All" as published in 1868
- Other name: "Fullness in Christ" "I hear the Saviour say" "Christ All and in All"
- Text: by Elvina M. Hall
- Composed: 1865: Baltimore, Maryland
- Publisher: Professor Theodore Perkins in Sabbath Carols periodical

Jesus Paid It All (also known as Fullness in Christ and I hear the Saviour say and Christ All and in All) is a traditional American hymn about the penal substitutionary atonement for sin by the death of Jesus. The song references many Bible verses, including Romans 5 ("Jesus' sacrifice gives life") and Isaiah 1:18 ("a crimson flow").

The song lyrics were written in 1865 by Elvina M. Hall, a 45-year-old widowed congregant. One Sunday morning, with an extremely long pastoral prayer, and a continuous sermon, Mrs. Hall's thoughts began to wander while sitting in a choir loft at the Monument Methodist Episcopal Church in Baltimore, Maryland. She wrote down a poem that came to her on the blank flyleaf of her hymnal.

She gave the lyrics to her pastor, Rev. George W. Schreck (or Rev. S. Barnes), at the end of the church service. Coincidentally, that same week the church organist (and coal merchant), John Grape (1835-1915), shared some new music, entitled "All To Christ I Owe," with the same pastor who thought the lyrics and song fit well together.

Hall and Grape worked to finish the hymn together, and then "at Schreck's urging, they sent the hymn to Professor Theodore Perkins, publisher of the Sabbath Carols periodical, where it received its first publication. It has been a favorite of many American Christians ever since." The song has been covered by many notable musicians, including Lory Bianco, Colton Dixon, and Forrest Frank.
