= Today's Christian Music =

Christian music chart

- Editor: Wes Jay
- Categories: Entertainment
- Frequency: Weekly
- Publisher: Woodlands Media
- Founder: Wes Jay
- Founded: 1999
- First issue: 15 February 1999
- Company: Christian FM Media
- Country: Australia
- Based in: Camarillo, California
- Language: English

Today's Christian Music (TCM), formerly known as The Rock Across Australia (TRAA), is an Australian organization which tabulates Christian radio airplay data into weekly published charts on behalf of the Australian Christian music industry. They are now based in Camarillo, California.

TCM published its first report on 15 February 1999. The chart listed the top 30 most played songs. It named Michael W Smith as Artist of the Year for 2002 and his track, "Purified", as Song of the Year. In March 2009 TCM's researcher was Wes Jay.
