= K-Love Fan Awards =

Christian award ceremony

- Current: 2026 K-Love Fan Awards
- K-Love Fan Awards logo
- Awarded for: Christian music industry achievement award
- Country: United States
- Presented by: K-Love
- Website: Official website

The K-Love Fan Awards (stylized as K-LOVE Fan Awards) is an annual American Christian music fan-voted awards ceremony show that is produced by K-Love. The show honors the most popular names in contemporary Christian music, sports, books and movies. The K-Love Fan Awards have been held annually since 2013.

== History ==
On February 13, 2013, K-Love held a press conference at the Ryman Auditorium in Nashville, Tennessee. They announced the inaugural K-Love Fan Awards, being the first fan-voted awards show for Christian music history, with artists such as TobyMac, Jeremy Camp, Francesca Battistelli in attendance. The voting process was set to begin in May, with the awards show where the winners would be announced set to be held on June 1, 2013, at the Ryman Auditorium and with hosting being done by Phil, Kay, Jase, and Missy Robertson of Duck Dynasty fame. K-Love had chosen Nashville as the host city for the award show because it is "home to the faith-based entertainment industry." On May 1, 2013, K-Love announced the nominees and performers for the ceremony, indicating that the nominees had been selected on the basis of airplay, spins, impact and overall performance. The awards ceremony was successfully held, drawing to a close on June 2, 2013.

In January 2016, K-Love opened official nominee selection to the fans for the first time, by way of online voting, in the lead-up to the 2016 K-Love Fan Awards. In February 2016, The K-Love Fan Awards were nominated by the Mid-South Emmy Awards in the Special Event Coverage, Lighting, and Set Design at the 30th Mid-South Emmy Awards. The K-Love Fan Awards won the Mid-South Emmy Awards for Lighting and Set Design.

In April 2018, K-Love announced that they had entered into a new partnership with TBN to televise the awards, beginning with the 2018 awards ceremony which was set to be broadcast by the network on May 31, 2018.

In April 2020, K-Love postponed the 2020 K-Love Fan Awards in abiding with social distancing regulations introduced in fighting the COVID-19 pandemic, announced that the awards weekend would return May 28 through 30, 2021.

The 2026 K-Love Fan Awards took place at the Grand Ole Opry and was broadcast on May 29, 2026.

== Categories ==
=== Current categories ===
- Artist of the Year
- Male Artist of the Year
- Female Artist of the Year
- Group/Duo of the Year
- Song of the Year
- Worship Song of the Year
- Breakout Single
- Film Impact
- TV/Streaming Impact
- Book Impact
- Podcast Impact
- Sports Impact

=== Retired categories ===
- Best Live Show
- Best Lyric
- First Christian Artist to Appear on 7UP Can
