= 56th GMA Dove Awards =

- Date: October 7, 2025
- Location: Bridgestone Arena, Nashville, Tennessee
- Country: United States
- Hosted by: Tauren Wells

Highlights
- Most nominations: Brandon Lake (9)
- Website: www.doveawards.com

Television/radio coverage
- Network: TBN (October 7, 2025 at 8 p.m. ET)

The 56th Annual GMA Dove Awards presentation ceremony was held on Tuesday, October 7, 2025, at the Bridgestone Arena located in Nashville, Tennessee. The ceremony will recognize the accomplishments of musicians and other figures within the Christian music industry for the year 2025. The award ceremony will air on Trinity Broadcasting Network on Friday, October 10, 2025, at 7:30PM ET and 10PM ET. The theme for this year’s awards show is “Creation Sings.”

The nominees were announced on Wednesday, July 30, 2025.

== Nominees ==
This is a complete list of the nominees for the 56th GMA Dove Awards. Winners are highlighted in bold.

=== General ===
Song of the Year

- "Counting My Blessings" - Seph Schlueter
  - (writers) Seph Schlueter, Jordan Sapp, Jonathan Gamble, (publishers) Sephame Street Publishing, Be Essential Songs, Songs By JSapp, Capitol CMG Paragon, Jonathan Conrad Gamble Publishing
- "Good Day" - Forrest Frank
  - (writer) Forrest Frank, (publishers) Universal Music Corp., Forrest Frank Publishing Designee
- "Goodbye Yesterday" - Elevation Rhythm
  - (writers) Gracie Binion, Steven Furtick, Mitch Wong, Josh Holiday, (publishers) Music By Elevation Worship Publishing, Be Essential Songs, Elevation Worship Publishing 2, All Essential Music, Original Wong Publishing, Bell Music Publishing, Three Tulips, Dvout Music Songs
- **"Hard Fought Hallelujah" - Brandon Lake**
  - **(writers) Brandon Lake, Jelly Roll, Steven Furtick, Chris Brown, Benjamin William Hastings, (publishers) Brandon Lake Music, Music By Elevation Worship Publishing, Be Essential Songs, Benjamin Hastings Publishing Designee, Bailee's Ballads**
- "Still Waters (Psalm 23)" - Leanna Crawford
  - (writers) Leanna Crawford, Jonathan Gamble, Justin Mark Richards, (publishers) Leanna Crawford Publishing Designee, Be Essential Songs, Jonathan Conrad Gamble Publishing, Capitol CMG Paragon, Justin Mark Richards Publishing Designee
- "That's My King" - CeCe Winans
  - (writers) Kellie Gamble, Jess Russ, Lloyd Nicks, Taylor Agan, (publishers) Taylor Agan Publishing, Curb Songs, Kingly Common Worldwide Publishing, Bridge Worship Music, Kellie Besch Music, Songs Of Bridge Worship, Be Essential Songs
- "That's Who I Praise" - Brandon Lake
  - (writers) Brandon Lake, Steven Furtick, Benjamin William Hastings, Zac Lawson, Micah Nichols, (publishers) Brandon Lake Music, All Essential Music, Music By Elevation Worship Publishing, Be Essential Songs, SHOUT! MP Brio, Capitol CMG Paragon, ZVC SONGZ, Amishengine, Kobalt Songs Music Publishing LLC
- "The Prodigal" - Josiah Queen
  - (writers) Josiah Queen, Jared Marc (publishers) Josiah Queen Publishing
- "The Truth" - Megan Woods
  - (writers) Megan Woods, Matthew West, Jeff Pardo, (publishers) Fair Trade Global Songs, Romans12twopublishing, Be Essential Songs, Combustion Five, Third Story House Music, Anthem Music Publishing II, BrentHood Music, Meaux Mercy, Capitol CMG Paragon
- "Up!" - Forrest Frank, Connor Price
  - (writers) Forrest Frank, Connor Price, (publishers) Forrest Frank Publishing Designee, Connor Price Publishing Designee

Songwriter of the Year - Artist

- Benjamin William Hastings
- **Brandon Lake**
- Chris Brown
- Forrest Frank
- Matthew West

Songwriter of the Year - Non Artist

- Jeff Pardo
- Jonathan Gamble
- Jordan Sapp
- **Mitch Wong**
- Zac Lawson

Artist of the Year

- Brandon Lake
  - (Record Label) Provident Entertainment
- CeCe Winans
  - (Record Label) Pure Springs Gospel/Fair Trade
- **Forrest Frank**
  - **(Record Label) River House Records/10K Projects**
- Josiah Queen
  - (Record Label) Josiah Queen Music/Capitol CMG
- Lauren Daigle
  - (Record Label) Centricity
- Phil Wickham
  - (Record Label) Fair Trade Services

New Artist of the Year

- Abbie Gamboa
  - (Record Label) Independent
- Caleb Gordon
  - (Record Label) Eden Records
- **Leanna Crawford**
  - **(Record Label) Provident Entertainment**
- Patrick Mayberry
  - (Record Label) Provident Entertainment
- Strings and Heart
  - (Record Label) Heaven Music/ReyVol Records

Producer of the Year

- Hank Bentley
- Jacob Sooter
- **Jeff Pardo**
- Jonathan Smith
- Josh Holiday

=== Rap/Hip Hop ===
Rap/Hip Hop Recorded Song of the Year

- "All For You" - Hulvey
  - (writers) Hulvey, Alexandria Dollar, Enzo Gran, Joel McNeill, ACE, Motown, Carvello
- "HEAVEN ON THIS EARTH" - Forrest Frank, Torey D'Shaun
  - (writers) Forrest Frank, Torey D'Shaun
- **"I Need Faith" - Alex Jean**
  - **(writers) Alex Jean, Ronald Banful, Jack Lawson, Darkchild, Temilade Openiyi**
- "I Need Help" - Connor Price, Maverick City Music, Taylor Hill (ft. Nick Day)
  - (writers) Connor Price, Jonathan Jay, Taylor Hill
- "Still Here" - Lecrae
  - (writers) Lecrae, Alexandria Dollar, Deandre Hunter, Juberlee, Kasey Rashel Sims, ACE, Richard Earl Douglas

Rap/Hip Hop Album of the Year

- Anike - Anike
  - (Producers) Clark D, Alexandria Dollar, Juberlee, Madness, Jeremy Brown, DvDx, Slikk Muzik, ACE, KelbyOnTheTrack, Jordan L'Oreal, Leslie Johnson, Kid Class, Bobby Keyz, Jeffery Shannon
- Christlike, California - Miles Minnick
  - (Producers) Darz, DJ Mal-Ski, Nate Simms, Jake Tompkins
- **CRY - Hulvey**
  - **(Producers) Hulvey, ACE, Enzo Gran, Yung Lan, OhRoss, Lobeats, Carvello, Andrew Prim, Juice Cuice, Torey D'Shaun, Jaden Eli, Tenroc, Dave James, James Maddocks, Clark D, theBeatbreaker, TnTXD, Djaxx, Regii, Choi1da, Elkan, Weathrman, John McNeil, Slikk Muzik**
- SORRY, I CHANGED (AGAIN) - Aaron Cole
  - (Producers) Saint X, Lynx, 1995, Jakik, Soli, Jacob Sooter, Jus D'vine, Elkan, Sajan Nauriyal, Joel Setien
- The People We Became - nobigdyl.
  - (Producers) Scootie Wop, Bunkerboy, Enzo Gran, Nate Rose, YOG$, Ashton Sellars, OB, Daniel Moras, Macshooter, 1995, vinnyforgood, Coop The Truth

=== Rock/Contemporary ===
Rock/Contemporary Recorded Song of the Year

- "Get Behind Me" - Emerson Day
  - (writer) Emerson Day
- "Grave Robber" - Crowder, Zach Williams
  - (writers) Crowder, Ben Glover, Jeff Sojka
- "RIP" - bodie
  - (writers) bodie, Sajan Nauriyal, Nick Bays
- **"sunset silhouette" - Strings and Heart**
  - **(writer) Angelo Espinosa**
- "Take It All Back" - Tauren Wells (ft. Skillet, Davies.)
  - (writers) Tauren Wells, Davies., Colby Wedgeworth, Ethan Hulse, Tedd T

Rock/Contemporary Album of the Year

- honeydew (praise the Lord) - Strings and Heart
  - (Producers) Angelo Espinosa, Emmanuel Espinosa
- Jungle In The City - Gable Price and Friends
  - (Producers) Gable Price, Aaron Brohman
- Living is proof. - EP - Citizens
  - (Producers) Zach Bolen, Connor Hedge, Ben Tan
- Revolution - Skillet
  - (Producers) Seth Mosley, Brian Howes, YOUTHYEAR, Carlo Colasacco, Korey Cooper
- **trustfall - Stephen Stanley**
  - **(Producers) Stephen Stanley, Tedd T, Jake Halm**

=== Pop/Contemporary ===
Pop/Contemporary Recorded Song of the Year

- "Desperate" - Jamie MacDonald
  - (writers) Jamie MacDonald, Jordan Sapp, Jonathan Gamble
- "GOODBYE YESTERDAY" - Elevation Rhythm, Gracie Binion
  - (writers) Gracie Binion, Steven Furtick, Mitch Wong, Josh Holiday
- "Still Waters (Psalm 23)" - Leanna Crawford
  - (writers) Leanna Crawford, Jonathan Gamble, Justin Mark Richards
- "That's Who I Praise" - Brandon Lake
  - (writers) Brandon Lake, Steven Furtick, Benjamin William Hastings, Zac Lawson, Micah Nichols
- **"Your Way's Better" - Forrest Frank**
  - **(writers) Forrest Frank, Pera**

Pop/Contemporary Album of the Year

- **Child of God - Forrest Frank**
  - **(Producers) Forrest Frank, Pera, Noah Conrad, JVKE, Jackson Foote, Johnny Simpson, Zac Lawson, Splash Of Soda**
- Heaven on My Mind - TobyMac
  - (Producers) TobyMac, Jordan Mohilowski, Kyle Williams, Micah Kuiper, Josiah Bell, Juan Winans, Jeff Pardo, Bryan Fowler, Tommee Profitt
- I BELIEVE - DEVOTIONAL - Phil Wickham
  - (Producer) Splash Of Soda
- The Exile- Crowder
  - (Producers) Ben Glover, Jeff Sojka, Hank Bentley
- The Prodigal (Deluxe Edition) - Josiah Queen
  - (Producers) Jared Marc, Evan Sieling, Jervis Campbell, Ben Foster

=== Inspirational ===
Inspirational Recorded Song of the Year

- "Christus Victor (Amen) [Live]" - Keith & Kristyn Getty, Cochren & Co.
  - (writers) Kristyn Getty, Matt Boswell, Bryan Fowler, Matt Papa
- "Rise Up" - Selah
  - (writers) Todd Smith, Shelly Moore, Cole Tague, Kolby Koloff
- **"The Jesus Way" - Phil Wickham**
  - **(writers) Phil Wickham, Jonathan Smith**
- "The Wonderful Blood" - Tiffany Hudson
  - (writers) Tiffany Hudson, Josh Holiday, Abbie Gamboa
- "Tonight" - Point of Grace
  - (writers) Andrew Greer, Tony Wood

Inspirational Album of the Year

- Church People - NewSong
  - (Producers) Sam Hart, Stephen Carswell, Tedd T., David Spencer, Michael Farren
- Higher Name - Selah
  - (Producers) Chris Bevins, Jason Kyle Saetveit, Jay Speight
- Sing! Songs of the Bible - Live At The Getty Music Worship Conference - Keith & Kristyn Getty
  - (Producers) Keith Getty, Kristyn Getty, Nathan Nockels
- Testament - Darlene Zschech
  - (Producers) Darlene Zschech, Jackson Barclay, Joth Hunt
- **The People's Hymnal - Jordan Smith**
  - **(Producers) Tommy Sims, Colin Linden**

=== Southern Gospel ===
Southern Gospel Recorded Song of the Year

- "If Not For Christ" - The Whisnants
  - (writers) Jason Cox, Jeff Bumgardner, Kenna Turner West
- "Love 'Em Where They Are" - Gaither Vocal Band
  - (writers) Benjamin Gaither, Tim Schoepf
- "Man On the Middle Cross" - Scotty Inman (ft. Jason Crabb, Charlotte Ritchie)
  - (writers) Scotty Inman, Lee Black, Jason Crabb
- **"That's What Faith Looks Like" - Karen Peck & New River**
  - **(writers) Karen Peck Gooch, Dave Clark, Wayne Haun**
- "You'll Find Him There (Live)" - Ernie Haase & Signature Sound
  - (writers) Ernie Haase, Joel Lindsey, Wayne Haun

Southern Gospel Album of the Year

- Foundations: The Hymns Of My Heart - Chris Blue
  - (Producers) Kevin Williams, Matthew Holt
- I'm Free: Songs That Wrote My Story - Joseph Habedank
  - (Producers) Kevin Williams, Matthew Holt
- Live In Memphis - Ernie Haase & Signature Sound
  - (Producer) Wayne Haun
- **Loving You - The Nelons**
  - **(Producers) Gordon Mote, Wayne Haun**
- Something to Shout About - Down East Boys
  - (Producer) Jason Webb

=== Bluegrass/Country/Roots ===
Bluegrass/Country/Roots Recorded Song of the Year

- "(More Than A) Hollow Hallelujah" - The Isaacs
  - (writers) Ben Isaacs, Lily Isaacs, Rebecca Isaacs Bowman, Sonya Isaacs Yeary
- **"Hard Fought Hallelujah" - Brandon Lake, Jelly Roll**
  - **(writers) Brandon Lake, Jelly Roll, Steven Furtick, Chris Brown, Benjamin William Hastings**
- "If It Was Up To Me" - Ben Fuller, Carrie Underwood
  - (writers) Ben Fuller, Ben Glover, Jeff Sojka
- "There's a Hole in the Heart" - The Nelons
  - (writers) Bill Gaither, Larry Gatlin
- "There's a River" - High Road (ft. Jaelee Roberts)
  - (writers) Rebecca Isaacs Bowman, Kenna Turner West, Sonya Isaacs Yeary

Bluegrass/Country/Roots Album of the Year

- Days That We Dreamed Of - Rhett Walker
  - (Producer) AJ Pruis
- Everything Good - Zane & Donna King
  - (Producers) Zane King, Donna King
- **Praise & Worship: More Than A Hollow Hallelujah - The Isaacs**
  - **(Producers) The Isaacs, Ben Isaacs**
- Straight from the Heart - High Road
  - (Producer) Ben Isaacs
- There Is Hope - Mark Lowry
  - (Producer) Ben Isaacs

=== Contemporary Gospel ===
Contemporary Gospel Recorded Song of the Year

- "Amen" - Pastor Mike Jr.
  - (writers) Pastor Mike Jr., Adia Andrews, Terrell Anthony Pettus, David Lamar Outing II, Jeremy Jamal Wilson, Juston Xavier Johnson, Andrea Crouch
- "Church Doors" - Yolanda Adams
  - (writers) Donald Lawrence, Sir the Baptist
- "Deserve To Win" - Tamela Mann
  - (writers) Tamela Mann, Phillip Bryant, Tia Sharee, Jevon Hill
- **"Holy Hands" - DOE**
  - **(writers) DOE, Jonathan McReynolds, Jeffrey Castro Bernat, Jesse Paul Barrera, Juan Winans, Kelby Shavon Johnson, Slikk Muzik, Timothy Ferguson**
- "In The Room [Afro Beat Version]" - Maverick City Music (ft. Annatoria)
  - (writers) Annatoria, Tasha Cobbs Leonard, Naomi Raine, G.Morris Coleman, Jonathan Jay, Carvello

Contemporary Gospel Album of the Year

- Dominion - Transformation Worship
  - (Producers) Mike Todd, Javier Ordenes, Matthew Lee Marin, Zachariah Reid, Eli Mboho, Eric W. Catron, Matthew Ramsey, Josiah Bassey
- **Live Breathe Fight - Tamela Mann**
  - **(Producers) Phillip Bryant, Jevon Hill**
- Still Karen - Karen Clark Sheard
  - (Producers) Mano Hanes, J. Drew Sheard, J. Drew Sheard II, Kenny Shelton, Jemes Moss, Paul Allen, Pharrell Williams, Quentin Dennard II
- Sunny Days - Yolanda Adams
  - (Producers) Jimmy Jam, Terry Lewis, John Jackson, Donald Lawrence, Sir the Baptist, Warryn Campbell, Terry Hunter
- Time Capsule - The Trilogy - FK&M, Fred Hammond, Keith Staten, Marcus Cole
  - (Producers) Fred Hammond, Keith Staten, Marcus Cole, Paul Wright III, Ray Hammond, Chuckii Booker, Royal Court

=== Traditional Gospel ===
Traditional Gospel Recorded Song of the Year

- "Church Medley (Live)" - John P. Kee
  - (writer) John P. Kee
- "He's A Wonder" - Chicago Mass Choir
  - (writer) Jamel Gardner
- "When I Think (Radio Edit / Live)" - Ricky Dillard
  - (writers) Ricky Dillard, Derrick Hall, Richard Smallwood
- "Work It Out For Me (Live Radio Edit)" - Zacardi Cortez
  - (writers) Zacardi Cortez, Travis Malloy, Trini Massie
- **"Yes" - Karen Clark Sheard**
  - **(writers) Anthony Brown, J. Drew Sheard II, Sandra Crouch**

Traditional Gospel Album of the Year

- Covered Vol. 1 - EP - Melvin Crispell III
  - (Producer) Dana T. Sorey
- **I Still Have You - Smokie Norful**
  - **(Producers) Smokie Norful, Jason Tyson, Antonio Dixon, Tony Chicago, Demonte Posey**
- Live Your Best Life! - Brent Jones
  - (Producers) Brent Jones, James Roberson, Eddie Brown, Michael Bereal, Jamie Gamble
- Then and Now (Live) - Marvin Sapp
  - (Producers) Curtis Lindsey, Israel Houghton
- We Still Believe! - The Mississippi Mass Choir
  - (Producers) Stan Jones, Jerry Smith, David R. Curry Jr., Jerry Mannery

=== Gospel Worship ===
Gospel Worship Recorded Song of the Year

- **"Come Jesus Come" - CeCe Winans, Shirley Caesar**
  - **(writers) Hank Bentley, Bryan Fowler, Stephen McWhirter, Tara McWhirter**
- "God Is In Control" - DOE
  - (writers) DOE, Dewitt Jones, Judah Jones, Amber Ais, Tommy Iceland, Ay'ron Lewis
- "One Hallelujah" - Tasha Cobbs Leonard, Erica Campbell, Israel Houghton (ft. Jonathan McReynolds, Jekalyn Carr)
  - (writers) Tasha Cobbs Leonard, Israel Houghton, Naomi Raine, G.Morris Coleman, Kenneth Leonard Jr
- "Rest On Us (Flow) [Live]" - Naomi Raine
  - (writers) Brandon Lake, Harvest Bashta, Tony Brown, Rebekah White, Elyssa Smith, Jonathan Jay
- "Yahweh" - Jason Nelson (ft. Melvin Crispell III)
  - (writers) Jason Nelson, Johnie Huntley Steele III, Danni Baylor, Jerome Baylor

Gospel Worship Album of the Year

- **Chandler Moore: Live in Los Angeles - Chandler Moore**
  - **(Producers) Chandler Moore, Aaron Robertson, Brunes Charles, Jonathan Jay, Jeff Pardo, Sam Simon**
- Presence People - Red Worship
  - (Producer) Terrance White
- The Maverick Way Reimagined - Maverick City Music
  - (Producers) Brunes Charles, Norman Gyamfi, Jonathan Jay, Carvello, Eddie Anders, Zachary Schossau, Sam Simon, Evan Ford
- Victory Sounds (Live) - Sinach
  - (Producer) Daniel Akagu Jones
- You Belong (Live) - Jason Nelson
  - (Producer) Dana T. Sorey

=== Spanish Language ===
Spanish Language Recorded Song of the Year

- "Al Estar Aqui" - Marcos Witt, TAYA
  - (writer) Marcos Witt
- "ALGORITMO" - Gabriel EMC, Alex Zurdo
  - (writers) Gabriel EMC, Alex Zurdo
- **"Coritos de Fuego" - Israel & New Breed, Unified Sound (ft. Adrienne Bailon-Houghton, Nate Diaz, Aaron Moses, Lucia Parker)**
  - **(writer) Traditional**
- "Sigue Caminando" - Sarai Rivera
  - (writer) Steven Richards
- "Worthy" - Blanca (ft. Yandel)
  - (writers) Blanca, Yandel, Anton Goransson, Isabella Sjostrand, Taylor Hill

Spanish Language Worship Recorded Song of the Year

- **"AMIGO" - Karen Espinosa**
  - **(writers) Karen Espinosa, Genock Gabriel Portela Perez, Jahdiel Roman**
- "Dios de Generaciones (En Vivo)" - Miel San Marcos, Josh Morales, Waleska Morales
  - (writers) Waleska Morales, Josue Morales, Sayra Morales, Lluvia Richards, Steven Richards
- "La Gloria de Dios" - ECCOS
  - (writers) Lluvia Richards, Steven Richards
- "Quien Mas [Live]" - Gateway Worship Espanol, Miel San Marcos (ft. Waleska Morales)
  - (writers) Abbie Gamboa, Josiah Funderburk, Zac Rowe
- "Yo Se" - Marco Barrientos
  - (writers) Marco Barrientos, Steven Richards, Eric Phillips

Spanish Language Album of the Year

- Algo Nuevo Viene - Elevation Espanol
  - (Producers) Edgar Aguilar, Courtnie Ramirez, Joel Lopez, Steven Furtick, Chris Brown, Josh Holiday, Chandler Moore
- Base y Fundamento - Redimi2
  - (Producer) Jonathan Barajas
- Habita (Live) - Lakewood Music Espanol
  - (Producers) Abel Orta Jr, Leanard Jarman, Ben Tan
- **KINTSUGI - Un Corazon**
  - **(Producers) Eliseo Tapia, Steven Richards**
- La Novia - Christine D'Clario
  - (Producer) Aaron Robertson

=== Worship ===
Worship Recorded Song of the Year

- "At The Altar" - ELEVATION RHYTHM, Tiffany Hudson, Abbie Gamboa
  - (writers) Tiffany Hudson, Abbie Gamboa, Josh Holiday, Davide Mutendji
- **"I Know A Name" - Elevation Worship, Chris Brown, Brandon Lake**
  - **(writers) Brandon Lake, Steven Furtick, Jacob Sooter, Hank Bentley**
- "Mighty Name of Jesus (Live)" - Hope Darst, The Belonging Co
  - (writers) Hope Darst, Jacob Sooter, Lauren Sloat
- "The King Is In The Room" - Phil Wickham
  - (writers) Phil Wickham, Ethan Hulse, Taylor Johnson, Tommy Iceland, Phil Danyew, Josh Farro
- "What A God (Live)" - SEU Worship, ONE HOUSE, Kenzie Walker, Chelsea Plank, Roosevelt Stewart
  - (writers) Kenzie Walker, Chelsea Plank, Roosevelt Stewart, Bobby Walker, Brunes Charles

Worship Album of the Year

- Here I Am - EP - JWLKRS Worship
  - (Producers) Jonathan Jay, Noah Schnacky, Lance Schnacky, Aaron Robertson, Tony Brown, Brunes Charles, Norman Gyamfi
- Move of God (Live) - SEU Worship
  - (Producers) Rob Ellmore, Day Bit
- Sold out, sincerely - Benjamin William Hastings
  - (Producers) Benjamin William Hastings, Ben Tan, Hank Bentley
- We Must Respond (Live) - Bethel Music
  - (Producers) David Whitworth, Jason Ingram, Brian Johnson, Dom Shahbon
- **When Wind Meets Fire - Elevation Worship**
  - **(Producers) Steven Furtick, Chris Brown, Josh Holiday, Chandler Moore**

=== Christmas / Special Event ===
Christmas Recorded Song Of The Year

- "Angels (Glory To God)" - Phil Wickham
  - (Writers) Phil Wickham, Jonathan Smith
- "Holy Forever (Christmas) [Apple Music Sessions]" - Chris Tomlin
  - (Writers) Chris Tomlin, Brian Johnson, Jenn Johnson, Jason Ingram, Phil Wickham, Chris Davenport
- **"Joy To The World" - CeCe Winans**
  - **(Writer) Traditional**
- "lowest of lows" - Josiah Queen
  - (Writers) Josiah Queen
- "We Sing (Joy to the World)" - Seph Schlueter, Leanna Crawford
  - (Writers) Seph Schlueter, Jonathan Smith, David Spencer

Christmas / Special Event Album of the Year

- A Drummer Boy Christmas (Live) [the Cinematic Concert Album] - for KING & COUNTRY
  - (Producers) for KING & COUNTRY
- Christmas Morning - Paul McClure, Hannah McClure
  - (Producers) Hannah McClure, David Whitworth, Mat Ogden
- **Hallelujah! It's Christmas! - Phil Wickham**
  - **(Producers) Jonathan Smith, Josh Auer, Jerad Atherton, Tyler Halford, Ben Lounsbury, Aaron Robertson**
- House Of David (Music Inspired By The Prime Video Original Series) [Season One] - Various Artists
  - (Producers) Tedd T., for KING & COUNTRY, Cason Cooley, Stav Beger, Ian Miller, Nate Dugger, Bizness Boi, Jester, Young T, Oh Gosh Leotus, Jeff Pardo, Jonathan Smith, Ben Tan, Kenneth Leonard Jr, Jonas Myrin, Hank Bentley
- Sweet Hymns Of Fellowship (Live) - Gaither
  - (Producer) Bill Gaither

=== Other categories ===
Children's Recorded Song Of The Year

- "Everything" - The Getty Girls, Keith & Kristyn Getty, Sandra McCracken, Skye Peterson
  - (writers) Kristyn Getty, Sandra McCracken, Skye Peterson
- "I'm So Blessed (Kids Version)" - CAIN
  - (writers) Logan Cain, Taylor Cain Matz, Madison Cain Johnson, Jonathan Smith, Matthew West
- **"Siempre Que Me Muevo" - Shout Praises Kids**
  - **(writer) David Ruis**
- "Spring Sings" - Ellie Holcomb
  - (writers) Ellie Holcomb, Nate Dugger
- "That's My King" - Yancy
  - (writers) Kellie Gamble, Jess Russ, Lloyd Nicks, Taylor Agan

Musical/Choral Collection of the Year

- **Cain for Kids**
  - **(Arranger) Steven V. Taylor, (Creators) Steven V. Taylor, CAIN, Sue C. Smith, Johnathan Crumpton**
- Hope Is Born
  - (Arranger/ Creator) John Bolin, (Orchestrator) Cliff Duren
- Ready To Sing I Surrender All
  - (Arrangers/ Orchestrator) Russell Mauldin, (Creators) Russell Mauldin, Tony Wood
- The Heart of Heaven
  - (Arrangers) Mike Speck, Cliff Duren, Josh Jenkins
- The Story: FLIGHT
  - (Arrangers) Eric Belvin, Jeff Bumgardner, Tim Cates, Cliff Duren, Wayne Haun, Alfredo Salmeron, (Creators) Jeff Bumgardner, Houston's First Worship, (Orchestrator) Tim Cates

Recorded Music Packaging of the Year

- A New Reality - Sarah Kroger
  - (Art Director/ Graphic Artist) Alicia St. Gelais, (Photographer) Erick Frost
- **Heaven On My Mind - TobyMac**
  - **(Art Directors) Nathan Blaine, Aaron Stearns, Trent Nicholson, (Graphic Artists) Nathan Blaine, Aaron Stearns, (Photographer) Robby Klein**
- Practice - Jackie Hill Perry
  - (Art Director) Kevin Hackett, (Graphic Artists) RJ Vergara, Niall Proctor, (Photographer) Joseph Hart
- Sold out, sincerely - Benjamin William Hastings
  - (Art Directors) Jay Argaet, Caleb Nietschke, (Graphic Artist) Caleb Nietschke, (Photographer) Anabel Litchfield
- We Must Respond (Live) - Bethel Music
  - (Art Director) Christian Ostrom, (Graphic Artists) Dario Prieto, Brady Gibson

=== Videos and films ===
Short Form Video of the Year (Concept)

- **"Can't Stop Me" - TobyMac**
  - **(Director) Eric Welch, (Producer) Scott McDaniel**
- "PRAY FOR ME" - Anike
  - (Director) Ade O Adesina, (Producer) Allah Amir
- "RIP" - bodie
  - (Directors/ Producers) bodie, Zane
- "Somebody Prayed" - Crowder
  - (Director/ Producer) Nathan Corrona
- "When I Fall" - Katy Nichole
  - (Director) Ives Salbert, (Producer) Joshua Wurzelbacher

Short Form Video of the Year (Performance)

- **"Hard Fought Hallelujah" - Brandon Lake, Jelly Roll**
  - **(Directors) Brandon Lake, Jacob Boyles, (Producers) Jacob Boyles, Rachel Mulcahy, Sadie Schwanberg, Caleb Cook**
- "I'm So Blessed (Sunday Morning Choir)" - CAIN
  - (Director) Elliott Eicheldinger, (Producers) Rachel Mulcahy, Scott Moore
- "Imago Interlude" - nobigdyl.
  - (Directors) Nate Rose, David Piersaul, (Producer) OB
- "No Fear" - Jon Reddick
  - (Director) Diego Brawn
- "The King Is In The Room" - Phil Wickham
  - (Director/ Producer) Colton Dall

Long Form Video of the Year

- **"A Drummer Boy Christmas (LIVE)" - for KING & COUNTRY**
  - **(Directors) Joel Smallbone, Kadin Tooley, (Producers) Joshua Walsh, Stephen Preston, Luke Smallbone**
- "Dios de Generaciones (En Vivo Desde Houston, TX)" - Miel San Marcos
  - (Directors) Alberto Rivera, Abraham Castillo, (Producers) Matthew Morales, Abel Vasquez, Elias Vasquez
- "Infinity" - Brooke Ligertwood
  - (Director/ Producer) Sam Irving
- "REBEL (Live From Lexington)" - Anne Wilson
  - (Director) Eddie Suparman, (Producer) Cory Reynolds
- "Reverie" - Paul Wright III
  - (Directors) Paul Wright III, John Frease, De'Niel Phipps, (Producer) Paul Wright III

Feature Film of the Year

- For the One
  - (Director) Noah Taher, (Producers) Ken Carpenter, Ben Howard
- Reagan
  - (Director) Sean McNamara, (Producers) Mark Joseph, John Sullivan
- The Best Christmas Pageant Ever
  - (Director) Dallas Jenkins, (Producers) Kevin Downes, Andrew Erwin, Jon Erwin, Daryl C. Lefever, Darin McDaniel, Chet Thomas
- The Forge
  - (Director) Alex Kendrick, (Producers) Stephen Kendrick, Justin Tolley, Trey Reynolds, Aaron Burns, Shannon Kendrick
- **The King of Kings**
  - **(Director) Jang Seong-ho, (Producers) Jang Seong-ho, Kim Woo-hyung**

Television Series of the Year

- God. Family. Football.
  - (Producer) Aaron Benward
- House of David
  - (Directors) Jon Erwin, Jon Gunn, Alexandra La Roche, Michael Nankin, (Producers) Kevin Downes, Andrew Erwin, Daryl C. Lefever, Panos Papahadzis, Petros Danabassis, Tony Young
- Jesus: Refugee, Renegade, Redeemer with Bear Grylls
  - (Director) Candace Lee, (Producer) Micah Barnard
- **The Chosen**
  - **(Director) Dallas Jenkins, (Producers) Dallas Jenkins, Chad Gundersen, Chris Juen**
