= Emmanuel y Linda =

Mexican-American alternative pop rock duo

- Origin: Mexico
- Genres: Rock; alternative; pop
- Years active: 2010–present
- Labels: ReyVol Records
- Members: Emmanuel Espinosa; Linda Espinosa

Emmanuel y Linda are a Mexican-American alternative pop rock duo, from Hermosillo, Sonora, Mexico, formed in 2010. The duo consists of Emmanuel Espinosa, a Mexican producer, musician and songwriter, known by his work with singer like Marcos Witt, Jesús Adrián Romero, and his wife Linda Moreno de Espinosa (American name Linda Espinosa). They were also the former leaders of the Mexican-American Christian rock band Rojo.

They have released one album, called Volver, with three singles "Buscaré", "Regénesis" which features the Rojo guitarist Oswaldo Burruel, and the Puerto Rican rapper Funky, who also helped write the song. The third single was the song "Mi Dios", that was released with a live video. This song is a cover of Chris Tomlin's song "Our God", one of the most important in the last 2 years, that was written with Matt Redman, Jonas Myrin and Jeese Reeves. They received six nominations at the Premios Arpa, the most influential Latin-Christian awards.

== History ==
Emmanuel Espinosa and his wife, Linda Espinosa (née Moreno), were the leaders of the band Rojo, and that was their only project. But in the year 2010, they posted on their official Facebook page that they would be recording their first album as a duo.

=== Volver (2011–2013) ===
The project objective was to inspire the people to go back to basics, Love God, and serve him, that's why the album name is Volver ("back"), because they wanted to show that the Christian life must turn back to God, who inspires a new life.

The musical style is very different from that seen in their band, because this album has a different sound, including more synthesizers and other electronic elements, mixed with an alternative rock and Latin sound. The album has four guests, in 3 songs, Oswaldo Burruel, in the song "Regénesis" in the guitars, also in that song Funky sings in the rap-bridge of the song (also, written by Funky). Mexican worship pastor, singer and songwriter Jesús Adrián Romero appears in the song "Llueve", a worship song on the album, and the youth band "SPIN 3", formed by the singer's kids.

Throughout 2010, the duo posted photos about the album recording in their official Facebook fan page, but did not announce the release date.

=== Voy tras de ti con todo (2014) ===
Is the second album of the duo.

== Discography ==
- Volver (2013)
- Voy tras de ti con todo (2014)

== Music videos ==
- "Es Lo Que Quiero"
- "Me Entrego Por Completo (Heme Aquí)"
- "Mi Dios"
- "Hoy Se Escucha Una Canción" (Ft. SPIN 3)
