= Washed (album) =

Live album by Elevation Rhythm
- Released: July 17, 2026
- Venues: Elevation Church (Charlotte, North Carolina)
- Genre: Worship
- Length: 43:20
- Label: Elevation Worship Records
- Producer: Josh Holiday

Elevation Rhythm chronology
Victory Lap (2025)	Washed (2026)

Singles from Washed
- 1. "Washed" Released: September 19, 2025; 2. "Thank God I'm Free" Released: January 9, 2026; 3. "Father's House" Released: May 8, 2026; 4. "Amazing!" Released: October 23, 2026

Washed (Note: Stylized in all caps) is the fourth live album by the American Christian music collective Elevation Rhythm. The album was released on July 17, 2026, through Elevation Worship Records. It contains writing credits from Abbie Gamboa, Chelsea Plank, Davide Mutendji, Joe L. Barnes, Jonathan Stamper, Josh Holiday, Josiah Queen, Kenzie Walker, Leeland Mooring, Mitch Wong, Naomi Raine, Nate Diaz, Steven Furtick, Sydney James, Tiffany Hudson, Tori Elliot, and Zac Lawson, and was produced by Holiday. It contains guest appearances from Averly Morillo, Jonathan Stamper, Josiah Queen, Lizzie Morgan, SEU Worship, and Violet Knull.

Washed was supported with the release of four singles, including "Washed" on September 19, 2025, "Thank God I'm Free" on January 9, 2026, "Father's House" on May 8, 2026, and "Amazing!" on October 23, 2026 on May 8, 2026. "Washed" peaked at number 97 on the Billboard Hot 100 chart and led the Billboard Hot Christian Songs. "Thank God I'm Free" and "Father's House" both peaked at number 27 on the Hot Christian Songs chart. "Amazing!" reached number 5 on the chart. The album itself peaked at number 4 on the Billboard Top Christian Albums chart at number 6 on the Official Charts Company UK Christian & Gospel Albums chart.

== Release and promotion ==
The album's lead single and title track, "Washed" was announced through teasers released to Instagram Reels. The song was initially released on September 19, 2025 to digital download and streaming formats; it was later released to Christian radio in April 2026, but had already been impacting Christian radio before then. With the song's release, it was supported with the release of an official music video, which was uploaded to YouTube. On January 9, 2026, "Thank God I'm Free", a collaboration with Morgan, was released as the album's second single. The song was supported with the release of an official music video, which was uploaded to YouTube.

"Father's House", a ballad in collaboration with Violet Knull, was released on May 8, 2026 as the final predecessor to Washed's release. In addition to a music video being uploaded to YouTube, the song was also promoted with an exclusive performance at Air1 studios. "Amazing!", a collaboration with Queen, was released as the album's only promotional single on July 17, 2026, and on October 23 was released to Christian radio in the United States as the album's fourth and final single. With the album's released, the songs "Amazing!", "Takeover", "Welcome Home", "Casa del Padre", and "I Still Believe It" were supported with music videos. (Note: Attributed to multiple sources:) Washed was promoted with the Washed Tour, which visited seven venues across the United States and lasted from September 2-25, 2026.

== Development ==
Washed primarily demonstrates the styles of contemporary worship music. It was recorded live at Elevation Church in Charlotte, North Carolina during the church's weekly youth nights. The album's intent is to "[capture] a season of worship centered on identity, freedom, and new life in Christ". Holiday, the album's producer as well as Elevation Rhythm's creative director, explained the meaning behind the album, saying:

Washed reflects what we've been seeing God do in the lives of young people. Every live album is really a time capsule. We're just trying to put in a bottle what God's doing in our youth.

— Josh Holiday

== Reception ==
Professional ratings
Review scores
Source	Rating
Jubilee Cast	3.5/5 stars

=== Critical ===
Speaking for Jubilee Cast, Timothy Yap rated the album 3.5-out-of-5, praising the album's "polished production" and "celebratory spirit", although he criticized its lack of "artistic innovation" and "lyrical depth".

=== Commercial ===
Washed contains three charted songs, including "Washed", "Thank God I'm Free", and "Father's House". "Washed" debuted upon the Billboard Hot Christian Songs at number 22. The song received heavy radio impact, topping the Christian Airplay and Christian Adult Contemporary charts drawing it to lead the Hot Christian Songs chart in July 2026 and reach number 6 on the Bubbling Under Hot 100 Singles chart. It marked Elevation Rhythm's first leader on the chart. The following two singles, "Thank God I'm Free" and "Father's House", both debuted at their peak position of number 27 on the Hot Christian Songs chart.

In the United States, the album itself debuted at number 4 on the Billboard Top Christian Albums chart, while in the United Kingdom debuting at number 4 on the Official Charts Company Christian & Gospel Albums chart. With the release of Washed, three additional tracks entered the Hot Christian Songs chart, including "Amazing!" at number 5, "Takeover" at number 44, and "Welcome Home" at number 49. Within the next several weeks, "Takeover" rose to number 37, and "Takeover Pt. 2" entered the chart at number 48.

=== Accolades ===
==== Song-specific ====
Year	Organization	Nominee / work	Category	Result	Ref.
2026	K-Love Fan Awards	"Washed"	Worship Song of the Year	Nominated	
2026	Dove Awards	"Washed"	Pop/Contemporary Recorded Song of the Year	Nominated	
2026	ASCAP Awards	"Washed"	Most Performed Christian Songs	Honored	

== Track listing ==
Washed track listing
No.	Title	Writer(s)	Length
1.	"Washed"	Josh Holiday; Mitch Wong; Joe L. Barnes; Steven Furtick	4:04
2.	"Thank God I'm Free" (featuring Lizzie Morgan)	Holiday; Wong; Tiffany Hudson; Sydney James	5:04
3.	"Amazing!" (featuring Josiah Queen)	Josiah Queen; Holiday; Zac Lawson; Furtick	4:22
4.	"Father's House" (featuring Violet Knull)	Holiday; Abbie Gamboa; Naomi Raine	6:00
5.	"Takeover" (featuring Jonathan Stamper)	Jonathan Stamper; Holiday; Wong	5:12
6.	"Takeover Pt. 2" (featuring Jonathan Stamper)	Stamper; Holiday; Wong; Furtick; Gamboa; Leeland Mooring	3:49
7.	"Welcome Home" (featuring SEU Worship)	Chelsea Plank; Holiday; Kenzie Walker; Furtick	6:24
8.	"Casa del Padre" (featuring Averly Morillo)	Holiday; Gamboa; Raine	6:00
9.	"I Still Believe It"	Davide Mutendji; Tori Elliott; Nate Diaz; Holiday	2:20
Total length:			43:20

== Charts ==
Chart performance for Washed
Chart (2026)	Peak position
UK Christian & Gospel Albums (Official Charts)	6
US Top Christian Albums (Billboard)	4

== Release history ==
Release history and formats for Washed
Region	Date	Format(s)	Label(s)
Various	July 10, 2026	Digital download; streaming	Elevation Worship Records
