= Centricity =

Brand of healthcare IT software systems

- Developer: GE Healthcare
- Available in: English
- Type: clinical information systems electronic medical records health informatics practice management revenue cycle management
- Website: www.gehealthcare.com/centricity

Centricity is a brand of healthcare IT software systems from GE Healthcare, formerly a division of General Electric. It includes software for independent physician practices, academic medical centers, hospitals and large integrated delivery networks. The various modules perform practice management, revenue cycle management, electronic medical records, medical imaging, and other functions.

GE HealthCare became an independent public company in January 2023, when its shares began trading on Nasdaq under the ticker symbol GEHC.

Centricity was introduced in 2003 with two applications, Centricity EMR and Centricity Physician Office - Practice Management. The products were acquired by what was then GE Medical Systems in 2002 and 2003 respectively, and released future versions of both products under the Centricity name. Additional products were added to the Centricity brand, such as Centricity Perinatal, Centricity Perioperative.

GE Healthcare acquired IDX Systems in 2006 and re-released its products under the Centricity brand.

Centricity Enterprise is being phased out with GE leaving the hospital EMR business to focus Centricity on EMR for medical practices. However, on April 2, 2018, General Electric announced it was selling some business assets including Centricity Business, Centricity Group Management, Centricity Practice Solution, and Centricity EMR to Virence Health, a subsidiary of Veritas Capital. The deal closed on July 11, 2018. Virence subsequently merged with athenahealth - another medical software vendor purchased by Veritas Capital in 2019.

The Centricity brand continues to be owned by GE Healthcare.
