= Tu Reinas =

"Tú reinas" (Spanish) or "Tu reinas" (Portuguese), meaning "You reign", may refer to:

- Tu Reinas an album by Diante do Trono
- "Tu reinas", the title track of the album by Diante do Trono
- "Tú reinas", Spanish song by the Mexican Christian rock band Rojo from Apasionado Por Ti 2009
- "Tú reinas", Spanish song and single by Seth Condrey from album North Point en Vivo 2012
