= Josiah Queen =

American musician (born 2003)

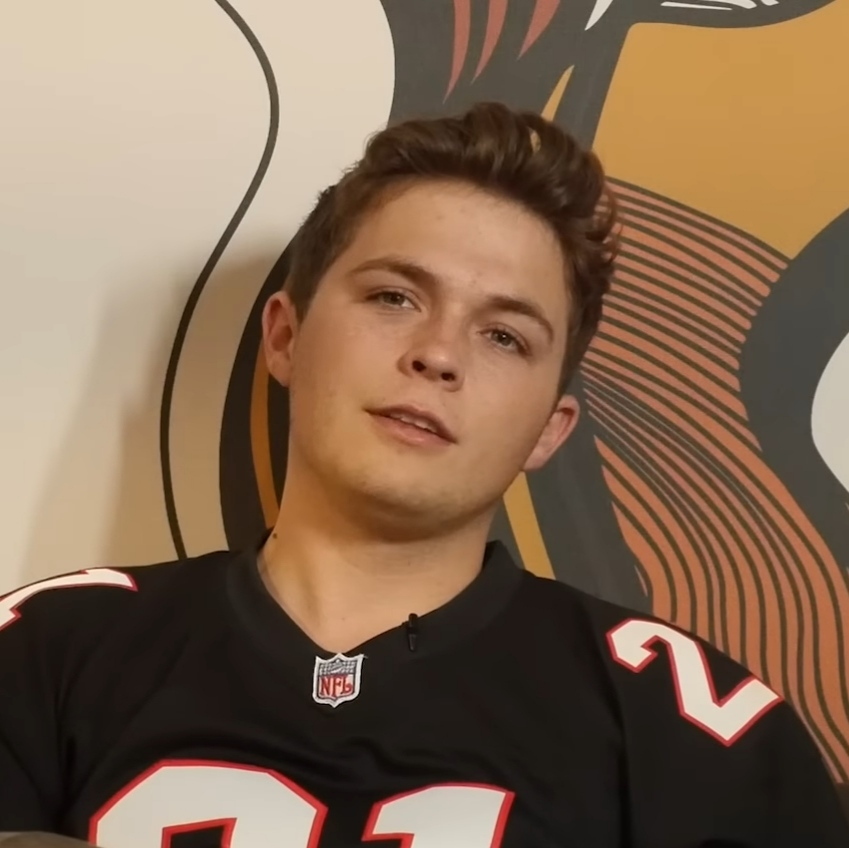
- Queen in 2024

Background information
- Born: January 11, 2003 (age 23); Clearwater, Florida, U.S.
- Genres: Christian contemporary, pop, folk, rock, R&B
- Occupation: Singer-songwriter
- Years active: 2020–present
- Labels: Capitol CMG; F&L Label Group; Independent
- Spouse: Trinity Joy (m. 2023)
- Website: josiahqueen.com

Josiah Queen (born January 11, 2003) is an American Christian contemporary singer-songwriter from Tampa, Florida. He was a nominee for New Artist of the Year of the 2024 GMA Dove Awards. Queen began releasing music at age 16 with "God of Miracles" in 2020. His debut album, The Prodigal, was released on May 24, 2024, and reached No. 1 on the Billboard Top Christian Albums chart. The album's title track was nominated for Pop/Contemporary Song of the Year of the 2024 GMA Dove Awards, and certified gold by the Recording Industry Association of America. He released a single, "Demons", as his first new song in 2026.

== Early life ==
Queen was born on January 11, 2003, in Clearwater, Florida. His parents are both pastors. He spent his early life going to church and serving as the church janitor.

== Career ==
=== 2020–2024: The Prodigal ===
Queen began his career in 2020, with the song "God of Miracles". Queen released his debut album, The Prodigal, in 2024. Reaching No. 1 on Billboard's Top Christian Albums chart, the album became the most streamed album from a new artist signed with Capitol Christian Music Group. At the 55th GMA Dove Awards in 2024, Queen was nominated for Best New Artist, as well as Pop/Contemporary Song of the Year.

Queen has released several singles, including "Love You to Death" with the band Strings and Heart and a Christmas song titled "Lowest of Lows".

In December on the Billboard Year-End charts, he was labeled as the No. 9 best Christian artist of 2024, the No. 4 best male Christian artist of 2024, the No. 4 Hot Christian Songs artist, and the No. 1 best new Christian Artist of 2024. His independent record label was labelled as the No. 10 best record label of 2024.

=== 2025: Mt. Zion ===
In 2025, Queen signed with Capitol CMG. He made his first release on the label on January 10, 2025, with "Can't Steal My Joy", which featured Brandon Lake. On March 14, 2025, he released the following single, "Yesterday is Dead", which will be performed on the national television show, Fox & Friends. A DC Talk cover, "Jesus Freak", was released on January 31, 2025. Queen's second studio album, Mt. Zion, released on August 22, 2025.

=== 2026–present: Josiah Queen alter-ego and Damascus Road ===
In 2026, Queen released "Demons", a song about spiritual warfare. On March 20, 2026, he released his second 2026 song, "Judas".

In August and September 2026, Queen launched a tongue-in-cheek social media marketing campaign featuring a fictional alter-ego named "Josiah King". Characterized by wearing Pit Viper sunglasses on Instagram and TikTok, the persona served as a vehicle for Queen to playfully troll himself, mock his own lyrics, and criticize his single "Sundays" for being released on a Friday.

On September 9, 2026, the persona was utilized for an official musical release when Queen released a house-infused, EDM remix of "Sundays" under the Josiah King moniker. The comedic campaign was noted by music journalists as a strategy targeting a younger generation of Christian music fans to build viral momentum ahead of his third studio album, Damascus Road.

== Personal life ==
Queen married Trinity Joy in 2023. They had met while teenagers, when Queen visited her family's church in Iowa. They live together in New Port Richey, Florida.

== Discography ==
=== Studio albums ===
List of studio albums with selected chart positions
Title	Details	Peak chart positions						
Title	Details	US	US Folk	US Rock	US Christ.	UK Down.	UK C&G	UK Amer.
The Prodigal	Released: May 24, 2024; Label: Josiah Queen Music; Formats: LP, digital download, streaming	—	—	—	1	—	18	—
Mt. Zion	Released: August 22, 2025; Label: Josiah Queen, F&L Label Group; Formats: CD, LP, digital download, streaming	57	4	10	1	—	8	22
Damascus Road	Released: October 23, 2026; Label: Josiah Queen, F&L Label Group; Formats: CD, LP, digital download, streaming	16	4	5	1	85	1	—
"—" denotes a recording that did not chart or was not released in that territory.

=== Singles ===
List of singles with selected chart positions
Title	Year	Peak chart positions								Certifications (sales threshold)	Album
Title	Year	US	US Rock	US Rock Digital	US Christ.	US Christ. Air.	US Christ Digital	US Christ. Stream.	NZ Hot	Certifications (sales threshold)	Album
"God of Miracles"	2020	—	—	—	—	—	—	—	—		Non-album singles
"Grave Clothes"	2022	—	—	—	—	—	—	—	—		Non-album singles
"Use Me"	2022	—	—	—	—	—	—	—	—		Non-album singles
"Empty as the Grave"	2023	—	—	—	—	—	—	—	—		Non-album singles
"I Am Barabbas"	2023	—	—	—	38	—	—	—	—		The Prodigal
"Fishes and Loaves"	2023	—	—	—	38	—	—	—	—		The Prodigal
"The Prodigal"	2023	—	27	—	4	15	—	3	—	RIAA: Platinum	The Prodigal
"Garden in Manhattan"	2023	—	—	—	28	—	—	—	—		The Prodigal
"My Promised Land"	2024	—	—	—	20	15	—	—	—		The Prodigal
"Altars Over Stages"	2024	—	—	—	50	—	—	—	—		The Prodigal
"Die a Beggar"	2024	—	—	—	45	—	—	—	—		The Prodigal
"I Need You More" (with Henrik)	2024	—	—	—	14	39	—	—	—		The Prodigal (Deluxe Edition)
"A Life Worth Dying"	2024	—	—	—	33	—	—	—	—		The Prodigal (Deluxe Edition)
"Love You to Death" (with Strings and Heart)	2024	—	—	—	20	—	—	—	—		The Prodigal (Deluxe Edition)
"Lowest of Lows"	2024	—	—	—	27	22	—	—	—		Non-album single
"Can't Steal My Joy" (with Brandon Lake)	2025	—	19	6	6	1	4	16	—	RIAA: Gold	Mt. Zion
"Jesus Freak" (with TobyMac)	2025	—	—	—	—	—	—	—	—		Non-album single
"Yesterday is Dead"	2025	—	—	—	25	—	—	—	—		Mt. Zion
"Two Wooden Beams"	2025	—	—	—	19	—	—	—	—		Mt. Zion
"Dusty Bibles" (original or with Avery Anna)	2025	92	11	3	3	9	4	3	— (Note: "Dusty Bibles" did not enter the Recorded Music NZ Hot Singles chart, but peaked at No. 20 on the Radioscope Most Added chart)	RIAA: Platinum; PMB: Gold	Mt. Zion
"Cloud and Fire"	2025	—	—	—	28	—	—	—	—		Mt. Zion
"I'll Fly Away" (with Benjamin William Hastings)	2025	—	—	—	25	—	—	—	—		Mt. Zion
"Jesus Is Coming Back Soon" (with Forrest Frank)	2026	— (Note: "Jesus Is Coming Back Soon" did not enter the Billboard Hot 100, but peaked at number 3 on the Digital Song Sales.)	—	—	6	—	1	12	22		Damascus Road
"Demons"	2026	— (Note: "Demons" did not enter the Billboard Hot 100, but peaked at No. 2 on the Bubbling Under Hot 100.)	16	2	1	2	2	1	29	RIAA: Gold	Damascus Road
"Judas"	2026	—	32	6	10	—	2	18	—		Damascus Road
"Make Heaven Crowded"	2026	—	—	—	13	—	10	—	—		Damascus Road
"Sundays"	2026	—	49	—	11	—	—	—	—		Damascus Road
"Amazing!" (with Elevation Rhythm)	2026	—	—	—	5	29	—	7	17		Damascus Road
"—" denotes a recording that did not chart or was not released in that territory.

=== Promotional singles ===
List of promotional singles with selected chart positions
Title	Year	Peak chart positions			Album
Title	Year	US Rock	US Christ.	US Christ. Stream.	Album
"Dusty Bibles" (remix)	2025	—	—	—	Non-album single
"You're Beautiful" (Phil Wickham cover)	2025	—	34	—	Damascus Road (Note: "You're Beautiful" appears exclusively on specific CD editions of Damascus Road.)
"When I See You"	2026	—	19	—	Damascus Road
"Damascus Road"	2026	—	31	—	Damascus Road
"Paradise"	2026	—	36	—	Damascus Road
"Out of Breath"	2026	45	9	23	Damascus Road
"Only God Almighty" (with Aodhán King)	2026	—	25	—	Damascus Road
"—" denotes a recording that did not chart or was not released in that territory.

=== Other charted songs ===
List of other charted songs with selected chart positions
Title	Year	Peak chart positions	Album
Title	Year	US Christ.	Album
"Take Me Home"	2024	24	The Prodigal
"Alone with You" (with Jervis Campbell)	2024	18	The Prodigal
"The Meaning of Life"	2025	50	Mt. Zion
"Watch Your Mouth"	2025	17	Mt. Zion
"Mt. Zion"	2025	46	Mt. Zion
"Galaxies"	2026	32	Damascus Road
"Fire in My Soul" (with Zvc)	2026	22	Damascus Road
"A Day with the Lord" (with Chelsea Plank)	2026	44	Damascus Road

=== Other credits ===
- Forrest Frank – "In the Room", 2025 (co-writer)

== Tours ==
=== Headlining tours ===
- The Prodigal Tour (with Strings And Heart) (2024)
- My Promised Land Tour (with Strings And Heart) (2025)
- Mt. Zion Tour (with Jervis Campbell and Gable Price) (2026)
- Damascus Road Tour (2027)

=== As a supporting act ===
- Forrest Frank – Child of God Tour (2024)
- Phil Wickham and Brandon Lake – Summer Worship Nights (2025)

== Awards and nominations ==
=== Amazon Music ===
Year	Nominee/work	Category	Result	Ref.
2024	Josiah Queen	Breakout Artists to Watch in 2024	Won	

=== ASCAP Awards ===
Year	Nominee/work	Category	Result	Ref.
2026	Josiah Queen	Christian Songwriter/Artist of the Year	Won	
2026	"Can't Steal My Joy"	Most Performed Christian Songs	Honored	
2026	"Demons"	Most Performed Christian Songs	Honored	
2026	"Dusty Bibles"	Most Performed Christian Songs	Honored	

=== Billboard Music Awards ===
Year	Nominee/work	Category	Result	Ref.
2024	"The Prodigal"	Top Christian Song	Nominated	

=== GMA Dove Awards ===
Year	Nominee/work	Category	Result	Ref.
2024	"The Prodigal"	Pop/Contemporary Recorded Song of the Year	Nominated	
2024	Josiah Queen	New Artist of the Year	Nominated	
2025	"The Prodigal"	Song of the Year	Nominated	
2025	Josiah Queen	Arist of the Year	Nominated	
2025	"Lowest of Lows"	Christmas Recorded Song of the Year	Nominated	
2025	The Prodigal (Deluxe Edition)	Pop/Contemporary Album of the Year	Nominated	
2026	"Can't Steal My Joy"	Song of the Year	Nominated	
2026	"Dusty Bibles"	Song of the Year	Won	
2026	"Dusty Bibles"	Pop/Contemporary Recorded Song of the Year	Won	
2026	Josiah Queen	Songwriter of the Year	Nominated	
2026	Josiah Queen	Artist of the Year	Nominated	
2026	Mt. Zion	Pop/Contemporary Album of the Year	Nominated	
2026	Mt. Zion	Recording Music Packaging of the Year	Won	

=== K-Love Fan Awards ===
Year	Nominee / work	Category	Result	Ref.
2024	"The Prodigal"	Breakout Single of the Year	Nominated	
2025	Josiah Queen	Male Artist of the Year	Nominated	
2026	"Can't Steal My Joy"	Song of the Year	Nominated	
2026	Josiah Queen	Artist of the Year	Nominated	
2026	Josiah Queen	Male Artist of the Year	Nominated	

=== We Love Awards ===
Year	Nominee / work	Category	Result	Ref.
2023	"I Am Barabbas"	Next Big Thing (Undiscovered/Underground Song)	Nominated	
2024	The Prodigal	Inspo Award (Inspiration Album of the Year)	Nominated	
2024	"The Prodigal"	Song of the Year	Nominated	
2024	Josiah Queen	Male Artist of the Year	Nominated	
2024	Josiah Queen	New Artist/Group of the Year	Nominated	
2025	"Dusty Bibles"	Song of the Year	Nominated	
2025	"Dusty Bibles"	Contemporary Song of the Year	Nominated	
2025	"Can't Steal My Joy"	Collaboration of the Year	Nominated	
