= Elevation Rhythm =

American Christian music collective from Charlotte, North Carolina

- Origin: Charlotte, North Carolina
- Genres: Christian contemporary; pop; rap/hip-hop
- Years active: 2019–present
- Label: Elevation Worship Records
- Members: Josh Holiday; Nate Diaz; Brittany Diaz Valerio; Davide Mutendji; Violet Knull
- Website: www.elevationrhythm.com

Elevation Rhythm (stylized as ELEVATION RHYTHM) is an American Christian music collective from Charlotte, North Carolina, affiliated with Elevation Church.

On April 1, 2022, the group released their debut studio album, Growing Pains. It was followed by This Is the Gospel, released on April 14, 2023, and Victory Lap, released on May 23, 2025. On the Billboard Top Christian Albums chart, This Is the Gospel reached No. 46, and Victory Lap reached No. 7. Elevation Rhythm, with Gracie Binion, also released their single Goodbye Yesterday on May 3, 2024, reaching the top 10 ranks on three Billboard Christian charts. All three releases were released on Elevation Worship Records.

== Discography ==
=== Studio albums ===
Title	Album details	Peak chart positions	
Title	Album details	US Christ.	UK C&G
Growing Pains	Released: April 1, 2022; Label: Elevation Worship Records; Format: Digital download, streaming	—	—
This Is the Gospel	Released: April 14, 2023; Label: Elevation Worship Records; Format: Digital download, streaming, CD	46	—
Victory Lap	Released: May 23, 2025; Label: Elevation Worship Records; Format: Digital download, streaming	7	—
Washed	Released: July 17, 2026; Label: Elevation Worship Records; Format: Digital download, streaming	4	6
"—" denotes a recording that did not chart

=== Singles ===
Title	Year	Chart positions						Certifications	Album
Title	Year	US	US Christ.	US Christ. Air.	US Christ. AC	US Christ. Stream.	NZ Hot	Certifications	Album
"Everything Everything"	2019	—	—	—	—	—	—		Non-album singles
"Never Walk Away"	2019	—	—	38	—	—	—		Non-album singles
"Wild Love"	2019	—	—	—	—	—	—		Non-album singles
"Reality"	2019	—	—	—	—	—	—		Non-album singles
"Hearbeat"	2019	—	—	—	—	—	—		Non-album singles
"Better With You"	2020	—	—	—	—	—	—		Non-album singles
"This Moment"	2020	—	—	—	—	—	—		Non-album singles
"Quiet"	2020	—	—	35	—	—	—		Non-album singles
"Better With You (Remix)" (with Aaron Cole)	2020	—	—	—	—	—	—		Non-album singles
Walk On Water"	2020	—	31	—	—	—	—		Non-album singles
"IYKYK"	2021	—	—	—	—	—	—		Non-album singles
"Simple" (with Joe L Barnes)	2021	—	—	—	—	—	—		Non-album singles
"Fake Love"	2022	—	—	—	—	—	—		Growing Pains
"Growing Pains" (with Mitch Wong)	2022	—	—	41	—	—	—		Growing Pains
"Aquí Estoy"	2022	—	—	—	—	—	—		Non-album single
"You Will Be Saved"	2023	—	—	—	—	—	—		This Is the Gospel
"Joy!"	2023	—	—	23	25	—	—		Non-album singles
"Praises (Remix)" (with Forrest Frank)	2024	—	26	—	—	—	—	RIAA: Gold	Non-album singles
"Goodbye Yesterday" (with Gracie Binion)	2024	—	7	4	4	10	—	RIAA: Platinum	Victory Lap
"At the Altar" (with Tiffany Hudson and Abbie Gamboa)	2024	—	28	—	—	—	—		Victory Lap
"Sing of Your Love" (Joe L. Barnes)	2024	—	24	40	—	—	—		Victory Lap
"Believe It"	2024	—	—	—	—	—	—		Victory Lap
"Washed"	2025	97	1	1	1	4	—	RIAA: Gold	Washed
"Thank God I'm Free" (with Lizzie Morgan)	2026	—	27	—	—	—	—		Washed
"Father's House" (with Violet Knull)	2026	—	27	—	—	—	—		Washed
"Amazing!" (with Josiah Queen)	2026	—	5	29	22	10	17		Washed
"—" denotes a recording that did not chart

=== Other charted songs ===
Title	Year	Chart positions		Album
Title	Year	US Christ.	US Christ. Air.	Album
"This Is the Gospel" (with Joe L Barnes)	2023	40	—	This Is the Gospel
"Where Oh Where"	2025	32	—	Victory Lap
"Over & Over"	2025	28	—	Growing Pains
"I Was, But God"	2025	—	36	Victory Lap
"Takeover" (featuring Jonathan Stamper)	2026	37	—	Washed
"Welcome Home" (featuring SEU Worship)	2026	49	—	Washed
"Takeover Pt. 2" (featuring Jonathan Stamper)	2026	48	—	Washed
"—" denotes a recording that did not chart

== Awards and nominations ==
Year	Organization	Nominee / work	Category	Result	Ref.
2026	K-Love Fan Awards	"Washed"	Worship Song of the Year	Nominated	
2026	K-Love Fan Awards	Elevation Rhythm	Group of the Year	Nominated	
2026	Dove Awards	"Washed"	Pop/Contemporary Recorded Song of the Year	Pending	
