= Strings & Heart =

American indie Christian band

- Strings & Heart performing in Nashville in 2026

Background information
- Origin: Tucson, Arizona
- Genres: indie Christian; indie rock; worship music
- Years active: 2019–present
- Labels: Independent (current); ReyVol Records / Heaven Music (former)
- Members: Angelo Espinosa (vocals/guitar); Michael Espinosa (bass/keys); Eric Espinosa (drums)
- Website: https://www.stringsandheart.com/

Strings & Heart (sometimes stylized as STRINGS & HEART or as Strings and Heart) is an American indie rock worship band from Tucson, Arizona composed of brothers Angelo, Michael, and Eric Espinosa.

== History ==
Angelo, Michael, and Eric Espinosa were born and raised in Tucson, Arizona to Emmanuel and Linda Espinosa.

The Espinosa brothers formed Strings & Heart in 2019 when a 19-year-old Angelo, after a transformative experience that brought him back to his faith, invited Michael and Eric to form a band to write and play worship music. The band's name is a reference to Psalm 150, which calls everything that breathes to praise God with many types of instruments.

Over the next four years, they released several singles and their debut album, Secret Place, with Reyvol Records, a label under Heaven Music which has signed Marco Barrientos and Marcos Vidal.

In 2023, their single "flowers dressed in blue" went viral on social media, launching them into fame.

In 2025, they released their sophomore album, Plastic Wine.

In 2026, starting the single "eyes on Him," they began releasing music independently, although they are still listed on Heaven Music's website.

== Artistry ==
Strings & Heart has described their genre as "indie Christian" and "indie-rock," and they cite The Beatles and Nirvana as musical influences. They have released songs in both English and Spanish.

They have collaborated on music with folk/CCM artist Josiah Queen, Mexican worship rock band Rojo (of which their parents are founder & lead singer), and Spanish artist Kike Pavón.

== Discography ==
Albums and EPs
Year	Title	Type	Songs	Notes
2023	Secret Place	Album	"more of you"; "new recording 595"; "flowers dressed in blue"; "rescue"; "i'm free"; "milk and honey"; "if i don't got you"; "wake me up 2night"; "rosa de amor"; "dulce" ft. Kike Pavón; "todo a ti"	
2023	more of you	EP	"more of you - single version"; "more of you - devotional version"; "your love"; "all to you"; "more of you"	
2025	evergreen	EP	"sunset silhouette"; "evergreen love"; "bright eyed"; "dopamine"	
2025	honeydew (praise the Lord)	EP	"all to you"; "honeydew (praise the Lord)"; "empty airport"; "sunset silhouette"; "evergreen love"; "dopamine"; "bright eyed"	Nominated for "Rock/Contemporary Album of the Year" at the 56th GMA Dove Awards
2025	wildfire	EP	"wildfire"; "backseat drive"; "honeydew (praise the Lord)"; "empty airport"	
2025	oasis for my soul	EP	"oasis for my soul"; "wildfire"; "backseat drive"; "honeydew (praise the Lord)"	
2025	Plastic Wine	Album	"kerosene"; "oasis for my soul"; "honeydew (praise the Lord)"; "good shepherd"; "flowers dressed in blue"; "backseat drive"; "evergreen love"; "i thank God - surf rock version"; "wildfire"; "empty airport"; "bright eyed"; "dopamine"; "sunset silhouette"	Won "Rock/Contemporary Album of the Year" at the 57th GMA Dove Awards
2026	stay for a while	EP	"stay for a while"; "peach sand"; "before the world began"	

Collaborations
Year	Work	Collaborating Arist	Type	Notes
2019	A Tus Pies (Hoy Me Rindo)	Rojo	Single; featured on Rojo's album Alumbras Mi Vida	
2019	Cuando Te Encontre (En Vivo)	Rojo	Single	
2020	"Navidad Es Jesús - REMIX"	Rojo	Single; featured on Rojo's album Esta Navidad	
2023	"dulce - Kike Pavón"	Kike Pavón	Featured on album Secret Place	
2024	love you to death	Josiah Queen	Single; featured on Queen's album The Prodigal (Deluxe Edition)	Reached #20 on Billboard's Hot Christian Songs
2025	honeydew (praise the Lord)	Claire Leslie	Single	

== Awards & nominations ==
Year	Organization	Nominee/Work	Award	Result	Ref
2025	Dove Awards	"sunset silhouette"	Rock/Contemporary Recorded Song of the Year	Won	
2025	Dove Awards	honeydew (praise the Lord)	Rock/Contemporary Album of the Year	Nominated	
2025	Dove Awards	Strings & Heart	New Artist of the Year	Nominated	
2026	Dove Awards	"eyes on Him"	Rock/Contemporary Recorded Song of the Year	Nominated	
2026	Dove Awards	Plastic Wine	Rock/Contemporary Album of the Year	Won	
