= Demons (Josiah Queen song) =

Single by Josiah Queen

from the album Damascus Road
- Released: January 16, 2026
- Genre: Christian; inspirational
- Length: 3:10
- Label: Capitol CMG; F&L
- Songwriters: Dylan Thomas; John Michael Howell; Josiah Queen; Zac Lawson
- Producer: Howell

Josiah Queen singles chronology
"Jesus Is Coming Back Soon" (2025)	"Demons" (2026)	"Judas" (2026)

Music video
- "Demons" on YouTube

"Demons" (stylized in all lowercase) is a song recorded by the American Christian musician Josiah Queen. The song was released as a single on January 16, 2026, via Capitol Christian Music Group and F&L Music Group. It was written by Queen, Dylan Thomas, John Michael Howell, and Zac Lawson, while Howell produced. The song topped the Billboard Hot Christian Songs chart, becoming Queen's first leader atop the chart.

== Writing and development ==
Timothy Yap of Jubilee Cast observed of "Demons" that it "confronts fear with victory and invites listeners to stand firm in their faith," with lyrics "facing spiritual battles and inner fear." Good Christian Music described it as "a bold anthem for anyone who’s ever felt haunted by fear, shame, or spiritual heaviness" which contained "cinematic production and poetic grit." Queen explained the inspiration behind the song, saying:

This song came from a real battle in my mind and the reminder that I don’t fight alone. When I prayed, God didn’t just hear me – He answered. It’s a declaration that fear and darkness don’t get the final word when your trust and hope is in Jesus.

"Demons" is composed in the key of D minor, with a speed of 127 beats per minute and a key signature of 4/4. It demonstrates the styles of Contemporary Christian and AC/inspo.

== Music video ==
Upon release, a lyric video for "Demons" was uploaded to YouTube. A music video, directed by Brady Pattee, was released on January 20, 2026. The music video depicts Queen driving a pick-up truck. The vehicle breaks down, leaving Queen stranded. He builds a fire and performs the song on an acoustic guitar.

== Reception ==
Professional ratings
Review scores
Source	Rating
New Release Today	5/5 stars

=== Critical ===
In a 5-out-of-5 star review for New Release Today, Josiah Scott praised the song's gradual build, noting that it "start[s] slow and gradually pick[s] up pace before being hit with a loud, richly textured chorus." He highlighted its quiet acoustic opening and later shift into a "wall of sound" production style that "explodes at the chorus." Scott also mentioned one moment he felt was "poorly structured," but described it as "only a minor error in the grand scheme of this song." He added that the track has "hit potential."

=== Commercial ===
Before the song's commercial release, teasers for the song were released to social media. They had achieved more than 11 million views by the time of the release. Within its first charting week, "Demons" peaked at No. 29 on the Recorded Music NZ's Hot Singles chart. In the United States, the song debuted at No. 16 on the Billboard Hot Rock & Alternative Songs chart, No. 4 on the Hot Christian Songs chart, and No. 7 on the Bubbling Under Hot 100 Singles chart. Supportively, the song appeared at No. 2 on the Christian Digital Song Sales and Rock Digital Song Sales charts, and No. 14 on the overall Digital Song Sales chart. It also hit No. 3 on the Christian Streaming Songs chart. The song debuted as biggest Christian chart debut of 2026. It also became Queen's first entry into a secular international chart as a solo musician, and the highest chart debut of his career.

== Track listing ==
All tracks are written by Dylan Thomas, John Michael Howell, Josiah Queen, and Zac Lawson.

Demons (Extended Single)
No.	Title	Length
1.	"Demons"	3:10
2.	"Demons" (featuring Julia Poe)	3:10
3.	"Demons" (featuring John Michael Howell)	3:10
4.	"Demons" (featuring Reagan James Broome)	3:10
5.	"Demons" (featuring Zac Lawson)	3:10
Total length:		15:50

== Personnel ==
Credits adapted from Tidal Music.

- Dylan Thomas – writer, guitar, vocals
- John Michael Howell – producer, writer, guitar, mixer, vocals
- Josh Groppel – immersive mixer
- Josiah Queen – writer, vocals
- Mike Cervantes – masterer
- Zac Lawson – writer, vocals

== Charts ==
Chart performance for "Demons"
Chart (2026)	Peak position
Australian Christian Airplay (TCM)	7
New Zealand Hot Singles (RMNZ)	29
UK Christian Airplay (Cross Rhythms)	3
US Bubbling Under Hot 100 (Billboard)	2
US Digital Song Sales (Billboard)	14
US Christian Airplay (Billboard)	2
US Hot Christian Songs (Billboard)	1
US Hot Rock & Alternative Songs (Billboard)	16

== Certifications ==
Certifications for "Demons"
Region	Certification	Certified units/sales
United States (RIAA)	Gold	500,000^{‡}
^{‡} Sales+streaming figures based on certification alone.

== Release history ==
Release history and formats for "Demons"
Region	Date	Format(s)	Label(s)	Ref.
Various	January 16, 2026	Digital download; streaming	Capitol CMG; F&L Music Group	
Various	January 19, 2026	Christian radio	Capitol CMG; F&L Music Group	
