= Gable Price and Friends =

American Christian rock band

- Gable Price and Friends performing in Nashville in 2026

Background information
- Origin: Redding, California
- Genres: Christian rock; indie rock
- Years active: 2018-present
- Label: Capitol CMG
- Members: Gable Price, lead vocals, guitar (2019-present); Cameron Pablo, guitar, programming, vocals (2020-present)
- Past members: Adam Elizarraraz, guitar (2018-2025); David Funk, bass and keys (2019-2023); Daniel Vargas, drums (2019-2024)
- Website: gablepriceandfriends.com

Gable Price and Friends is an American indie rock worship band from Redding, California. They are best known for their songs "I Need You" and "Brother Jack," which was nominated for a GMA Dove Award.

== History ==
Gable Price and Friends was established by Gable Price in 2018 while attending school in Redding, partially in response to failing to make it onto his school's music team. Price recruited his friends — guitarist Adam Elizarraraz, drummer Daniel Vargas, and producer Jace Fay — to record a debut EP, The Redding EP, which they released in 2018. They intended for their music to be singable by church congregations.

In 2019, the band began writing and recording their first full-length album, Fractioned Heart, which played a formative role for the band. This is the first album that introduced David Funk as a bass player/producer and Cameron Pablo as a guitar player. The band recorded the album in producer Aaron Brohman's studio in Sacramento, California. The album was released on June 12, 2020, and with the band hosted a YouTube livestream playing the full album top to bottom, plus more music from their EP, Dead Man.

In 2023, their song "Brother Jack" won "Rock/Contemporary Recorded Song of the Year" at the 54th GMA Dove Awards.

In 2024, Daniel Vargas left the band. The next year, Adam Elizarraraz followed suit.

Gable Price and Friends toured with Fitz and the Tantrums in 2025. That same year, they were featured on Josiah Queen's song, "Thief in the Night." The band subsequently joined Queen, along with Benjamin William Hastings, for his Mt. Zion Tour in the spring of 2026.

In October 2026, the band released Moving Target, their 8th EP.

== Members ==
Current members

- Gable Price – lead vocals, guitar, keyboards, piano (2019–present)
- Cameron Pablo – electric guitar, acoustic guitar, keyboards, programming, producer, vocals (2020–present)

Current touring members

- David Roberts – drums (2025-present)
- Kyle Neblett – drums (2024-present)
- Jack Price – bass (2026-present)
- Zach Luper – bass (2024-present)
- Andrew Smith – electric guitar (2026-present)

Former members

- Adam Elizarraraz – guitar (2019–2025)
- David Funk – bass, keys, producer, vocals (2020–2023)
- Daniel Vargas – drums (2019-2023)

Former Touring/Live Members

- Aaron Brohman – drums (2025)
- Pablo Segovia – bass (2019)
- Sarah Sperber – backing vocals (2019)

== Discography ==
Albums
| Year | Title | Type | Tracks | Notes |
|---|---|---|---|---|
| 2018 | The Redding EP | EP | "Intro (Dads Song)"; "Dead Man"; "Touch Your Robe"; "Galilee" | |
| 2020 | Fractioned Heart | Album | "Heretic"; "Awestruck Revival"; "Communion"; "Demons"; "Ten Percent"; "Underdressed"; "Evergreen"; "Not Safe"; "Midway Drive"; "Repentance" | |
| 2020 | Fractioned (Live) | EP | "Intro - Live"; "Heretic - Live"; "Communion - Live"; "Demons - Live"; "Evergreen - Live"; "Magnetic Love - Live" | |
| 2021 | The Boxes Humans Made | EP | Awestruck Revival [Reimagined]"; "Repentance [Reimagined]"; "Demons (Reimagined)" ft. Mike Mains; "Heretic (Reimagined)" | |
| 2022 | If I'm Being Honest... | EP | "50 MG"; "I Need You"; "Someday (Regrow)"; "If I'm Being Honest..."; "50 MG - Live In Atlanta"; "I Need You - Live In Nashville" | |
| 2022 | The Consequence Of Being Alive | Album | "Upside"; "Brother Jack"; "Tough Love"; "I LOVE TO STRUGGLE"; "Treason"; "I Don't Wanna Live Like This"; "Jesus Christ (Hold Me Steady)"; "How It Sets You Free"; "Lucky #17"; "Easy To Love You"; "The Consequence Of Being Alive" | |
| 2023 | Live At THE END | EP | "Upside - Live At THE END"; "I Don't Wanna Live Like This - Live At THE END"; "Brother Jack - Live At THE END"; "Tough Love - Live At THE END"; "I LOVE TO STRUGGLE - Live At THE END" | |
| 2024 | Jungle In The City | EP | "Newspaper Boat"; "Think With Your Chest"; "Mountains And Mundane"; "Jungle In The City"; "Fall In Love With The Light"; "Heaven Closes Doors"; "Deeply Human" | |
| 2024 | Jungle In The City | Album | "Newspaper Boat"; "Think With Your Chest"; "Mountains And Mundane"; "Jungle In The City"; "Fall In Love With The Light"; "Heaven Closes Doors"; "Deeply Human" | Nominated for "Rock/Contemporary Album of the Year" at the 56th GMA Dove Awards |
| 2025 | Post Credits Scenes | EP | "Heaven Closes Doors (reimagined)"; "Intro (from tour)"; "Newspaper Boat (from tour)"; "Jungle In The City (from tour)"; "Fall In Love With The Light (reimagined)" | |
| 2026 | Moving Target | Album | "Moving Target"; "Looking For You"; "Too Good"; "Talking Like Friends"; "Why Do You Love Me?"; "One Bedroom Apartment"; "Elephant" | |

Singles
| Year | Title | Notes | Collaborating Artist |
|---|---|---|---|
| 2020 | "Communion" | Single; featured on album Fractioned Heart | Mark Barlow |
| 2020 | "You Are My Country" | Single | Kristene DiMarco |
| 2021 | "Awestruck Revival [Reimagined]" | Featured on EP The Boxes Humans Made | David Leonard |
| 2021 | "Repentance [Reimagined]" | Featured on EP The Boxes Humans Made | Cory Asbury |
| 2021 | "Demons (Reimagined)" | Featured on EP The Boxes Humans Made | Mike Mains |
| 2022 | "How It Sets You Free" | Featured on album The Consequences of Being Alive | Jon Foreman |
| 2025 | "Heaven Closes Doors (reimagined)" | Single; featured on EP Post Credits Scenes | Jude Moses |

== Awards and nominations ==
| Year | Organization | Nominee/Work | Award | Result | Ref |
|---|---|---|---|---|---|
| 2022 | GMA Dove Awards | "I Need You" | Rock/Contemporary Recorded Song of the Year | Nominated | |
| 2023 | GMA Dove Awards | "Brother Jack" | Rock/Contemporary Recorded Song of the Year | Won | |
| 2025 | GMA Dove Awards | Jungle in the City | Rock/Contemporary Album of the Year | Nominated | |
