= Amazing! =

Single by Elevation Rhythm and Josiah Queen

from the album Washed and Damascus Road
- Released: July 17, 2026
- Venue: Elevation Church (Charlotte, North Carolina)
- Genre: Worship; gospel
- Length: 4:24
- Label: Elevation Worship Records
- Songwriters: Josh Holiday; Josiah Queen; Steven Furtick; Zac Lawson
- Producer: Holiday

Music video
- "Amazing!" on YouTube

"Amazing!" is a song recorded live by the American contemporary worship collective Elevation Rhythm and contemporary Christian musician Josiah Queen. The song was released as a promotional single on July 17, 2026, coinciding with the release of the collective's album, Washed, which the track appeared on. Later that year it appeared on Queen's album Damascus Road. On October 23, 2026, it was released to Christian radio in the United States as the fourth single from Washed and the sixth single from Damascus Road. "Amazing!" peaked at number 5 on the Billboard Hot Christian Songs chart.

== Release ==
Both artists had been releasing teasers to social media hinting at the release of the song, but it was not announced officially until the day of release when Queen announced the song on Facebook. Upon the song's release to digital download and streaming formats, "Amazing!" was promoted with the release of a music video, which was uploaded to YouTube. The song appeared on Elevation Rhythm's album Washed, which was released the same day, and later on Queen's album Damascus Road. On October 23, 2026, it was released to Christian radio in the United States.

== Composition ==
"Amazing!" is primarily a worship and gospel song. Running for a length of four minutes and 24 seconds, it is composed in the key of G♭, with a speed of 145 beats per minute and a time signature of 4/4. The song begins with an acoustic guitar in the first verses of the song, before crescendoing into a louder chorus, in attempt to model the "faith-based energy and joy" in the track's lyrics; the song's build has been reason for great acclaim among fans on social media. The lyrics demonstrate the performer's "sense of relief and thankfulness". "Amazing!" was recorded live at Elevation Church in Charlotte, North Carolina. It was written by Josh Holiday, Queen, Steven Furtick, and Zac Lawson, while Holiday produced.

== Reception ==
=== Critical ===
Writing for Jubilee Cast, Timothy Yap labelled "Amazing!" as one of the best songs from Washed. In comparison with the rest of the album, he believed the song "provides a welcome stylistic lift", praising Queen's "recognizable vocal tone" and Elevation Rhythm's "polished production". Yap also felt that the song was far less "predictable" than the rest of the album.

=== Commercial ===
"Amazing!" debuted at its peak position of number 5 on the Billboard Hot Christian Songs chart, at the same time peaking at number 10 on the Christian Streaming Songs chart.

== Personnel ==
Credits adapted from Apple Music.

=== Production ===
- Alex Young – engineer
- Believe Kamba – engineer
- Dustin Maxwell – engineer
- Graham King – engineer
- Ian Womack – engineer
- Jack Nellis – mixer, masterer, engineer
- Josh Holiday – writer, programmer, producer
- Josh Linker – engineer
- Josiah Queen – writer
- Mike Cervantes – masterer
- Nathan Decker – engineer
- Steven Furtick – writer, executive producer
- William Oakley – recording engineer
- Zac Lawson – writer
- Zach King – engineer

=== Performers ===
- Boips – background vocals
- Brennan Hales – background vocals
- Brittany Diaz – background vocals
- Chris Preslar – background vocals
- Christian Flemming – background vocals
- Cole Hines – background vocals
- Davide Mutendji – background vocals
- E. Edwards – guitar
- Emily Davis – background vocals
- Evan Pahl – background vocals
- Gracie Chapman – background vocals
- Heidi Gorecki – background vocals
- Jackson Ramsay – background vocals
- Jacob Johnson – guitar
- Josh Holiday – keyboards
- Josiah Queen – lead vocals
- Mavi Garcia – background vocals
- Nate Diaz – lead vocals
- Nick Edwards – bass guitar
- Nina Coffey – background vocals
- Raffaella de Castro Oropeza – background vocals
- Santiago Jimenez – bass guitar
- Sara Preslar – background vocals
- Tate Sigmon – background vocals
- Tony Lambright Jr. – drums, percussion
- Tori Templet – background vocals

== Charts ==
Chart performance for "Amazing!"
Chart (2026)	Peak position
New Zealand Hot Singles (RMNZ)	17
US Christian Adult Contemporary (Billboard)	22
US Christian Airplay (Billboard)	29
US Hot Christian Songs (Billboard)	5

== Release history ==
Release history and formats for Washed
Region	Date	Format(s)	Label(s)
Various	July 17, 2026	Digital download; streaming	Elevation Worship Records
Various	July 17, 2026	Digital download; streaming; (with Washed)	Elevation Worship Records
United States	October 23, 2026	Christian radio	Josiah Queen Music; F&L Label Group
Various	October 23, 2026	CD; LP; digital download; streaming; (with Damascus Road)	Josiah Queen Music; F&L Label Group
