= The Prodigal (Josiah Queen album) =

Studio album by Josiah Queen
- Released: May 24, 2024
- Length: 34:59
- Label: Independent
- Producer: Jared Condon

Josiah Queen chronology
The Prodigal (2024)	Mt. Zion (2025)

Alternative cover
- Deluxe edition album cover

Singles from The Prodigal
- 1. "I Am Barabbas" Released: April 28, 2023; 2. "Fishes and Loaves" Released: June 2, 2023; 3. "The Prodigal" Released: September 1, 2023; 4. "Garden in Manhattan" Released: November 10, 2023; 5. "My Promised Land" Released: January 26, 2024; 6. "Altars over Stages" Released: March 29, 2024; 7. "Die a Beggar" Released: May 10, 2024

Singles from The Prodigal (Deluxe edition)
- 1. "I Need You More (with Henrik)"; 2. "A Life Worth Dying" Released: September 2, 2024; 3. "Love You to Death (with Strings and Heart)" Released: October 18, 2024

The Prodigal is the debut studio album by American Christian contemporary musician Josiah Queen. The album was released independently on May 24, 2024. It reached No. 1 on the Billboard Top Christian Albums chart and No. 18 on the Official Charts Christian/Gospel Albums chart. Seven of the songs off the album were released as singles, and one of the songs was not released as a single, but entered the charts regardless. The title track of the album was nominated for Pop/Contemporary Song of the Year at the 55th GMA Dove Awards. At 6.6 million global streams, the album is considered to be biggest streaming album debut in Contemporary Christian music history. The album's style is considered a blend of folk, acoustic, and rock. On November 22, 2024, a deluxe edition of the album was released, featuring 10 additional songs.

== Track listing ==
Original edition
No.	Title	Writer(s)	Length
1.	"Garden in Manhattan"	Josiah Queen; Jonathan Gamble; Austin Cain	2:35
2.	"In the Fire"	Queen	2:52
3.	"Fishes and Loaves"	Queen; Jared Condon	3:36
4.	"Things that Matter"	Queen; Gamble	3:06
5.	"The Prodigal"	Queen; Condon	3:13
6.	"Die a Beggar"	Queen; David Leonard	3:52
7.	"Altars Over Stages"	Queen	3:10
8.	"My Promised Land"	Queen	3:14
9.	"Take Me Home"	Queen	2:55
10.	"I Am Barabbas"	Queen	3:22
11.	"Who I Was"	Queen	3:00
Total length:			34:59

Deluxe edition
No.	Title	Writer(s)	Length
1.	"Alone With You" (with Jervis Campbell)	Josiah Queen; Jervis Campell	2:34
2.	"I Need You More" (with Henrik)	Josiah; Henrik Hoeltdtke; Jared Condon	3:11
3.	"Love You to Death" (with Strings and Heart)	Queen; Angelo Espinosa; Remoeo Barela	2:52
4.	"A Life Worth Dying"	Queen; Condon	2:50
16.	"My Promised Land" (Oasis coffee session)	Queen	3:22
17.	"Take Me Home" (Oasis coffee session)	Queen	3:04
18.	"FIshes and Loaves" (Oasis coffee session)	Queen, Condon	4:40
19.	"I Am Barabbas" (Oasis coffee sessions)	Queen	3:57
20.	"Die a Beggar" (Oasis coffee session)	Queen; Leonard	3:52
21.	"The Prodigal" (Oasis coffee session)	Queen; Condon	3:42
Total length:			70:24

== Charts ==
=== Weekly charts ===
Chart (2024)	Peak position
UK Christian & Gospel Albums (OCC)	18
US Top Christian Albums (Billboard)	1

=== Year-end charts ===
Chart (2024)	Position
US Top Christian Albums (Billboard)	35
Chart (2025)	Position
US Top Christian Albums (Billboard)	6
