= Apasionado por Ti =

Studio album by Rojo
- Released: March 3, 2009
- Genres: Contemporary Christian music, Christian rock, pop
- Length: 48:38
- Label: Reyvol Records
- Producer: Emmanuel Espinosa

Rojo chronology
Con el Corazón en la Mano (2007)	Apasionado por Ti (2009)	Rojo 10 Años (2010)

Apasionado por Ti is the fifth studio album by the Mexican Christian rock band Rojo. The album was produced by the bass guitarist Emmanuel Espinosa and released on March 3, 2009.

== Track listing ==
1. "Intro - He Decidido" – 0:55
2. "Siguiédote Los Pasos" – 3:00
3. "Tu Amor Hace Eco en Todo Mi Universo" – 3:52
4. "Alabad a Dios (Todo para un Rey)" – 4:52
5. "Tu Reinas" – 4:39
6. "Fuego de Dios" – 4:00
7. "Solo Quiero Estar Donde Tú Estás" – 4:14
8. "Te Necesito" – 2:38
9. "Te Amo Más Que a Mi Misma Vida" – 4:26
10. "Una Generación Apasionada" – 4:33
11. "Haré Oír Mi Voz" – 3:24
12. "Envíame" – 2:46
13. "Cuán Grande Es Él" – 5:12

== Awards ==
In 2009, the album won the Arpa Award for Best Album of the Year. It was nominated for a Dove Award for Best Spanish Language Album of the Year at the 41st GMA Dove Awards.
