= Overflow: The Album =

Studio album by Transformation Worship
- Released: May 17, 2024
- Genre: worship; gospel; Christian contemporary
- Length: 53:56
- Label: Represent
- Producer: Michael A. Todd; Matt Ramsey; Dominick Sanchez; Matt Marin; Javier Ordenes; Josiah Bassey; Mie Todd; Eli Mboho; Matthew Lee Marin; Antonio Screen Jr; Eric W Catron; Zachariah Reid

Transformation Worship chronology
Here Is Holy EP (2023)	Overflow: The Album (2024)	Dominion (2024)

Singles from Overflow
- 1. "I Will" Released: May 19, 2023; 2. "Overflow" Released: April 12, 2024; 3. "Yahweh" Released: April 26, 2024

Overflow: The Album is the debut studio album by American Christian worship collective Transformation Worship. The album was released on May 17, 2024, through Represent Records. Three of the songs on the album were released as singles, "I Will", "Overflow" and "Yahweh". The album reached number one on the Billboard Top Christian Albums and Top Gospel Albums charts, and number 78 on the Official Charts Top Album Downloads chart in the UK. The seven-track album was recorded live.

The album sold 6,000 copies in the United States.

== Track listing ==
No.	Title	Writer(s)	Producer	Length
1.	"Overflow" (with Todd Dulaney)	Anthony Galloway; Evan Devell Ford; Michael A. Todd	Michael A. Todd; Matt Ramsey; Dominich Sanchez; Matt Marin; Javier Ordenes	6:12
2.	"Impossible? (Nothing At All)" (with Josiah Bassey, Mike Todd and Roosevelt Stewart)	Destiny Joy Crockett; Mike Todd; Osby Berry	Josiah Bassey; Mike Todd; Eli Mboho; Matthew Ramsey	9:01
3.	"I Will" (with Evan Ford)	Aaron David; Caleb Sean McCampbell; Charles Henry Metcalf; Destiny Joy Crockett; Even Devell Ford; Javier Ordenes; Matthew Crockett; Matthew Lee Marin; Melody Dunlap; Mie Todd; Osby Berry	Javier Ordenes	5:01
4.	"Evidence" (with Osby Berry)	Caleb Sean McCampbell; Charles Henry Metcalf; Destiny Joy Crockett; Javier Ordenes; Matthew Less Marin; Matthew Ramsey; Melody Dunlap; Mike Todd; Osby Berry	Javier Ordenes; Matthew Lee Marin; Matthew Ramsey	8:46
5.	"Anchored" (with Tauren Wells and Fred Hammond)	Caleb Sean McCampbell; Charles Henry Metcalf; Destiny Joy Crockett; Evan Devell Ford; Javier Ordenes; Matthew Lee Marin; Melody Dunlap; Mike Todd	Matthew Lee Marin; Javier Ordenes	5:23
6.	"Siempre Conmigo" (with Nate Diaz and Pauneto)	Caleb Sean McCampbell; Charles Henry Metcalf; Destiny Joy Crockett; Evan Devell Ford; Melody Dunlap; Mike Todd; Moises Veliz; Osby Berry	Matthew Lee Marin; Javier Ordenes	7:18
7.	"Yahweh" (with Roosevelt Stewart and Elizabeth Rosa)	Antonio Screen Jr; Christian Spaulding; Destiny Joy Crockett; Eli Mboho; Eric W. Catron; Josiah Bassey; Matt Ramsey; Mike Todd; Roosevelt Stweart Jr; Zachariah Reid	Mike Todd; Antonio Screen Jr; Eric W. Catron; Zachariah Reid; Matt Ramsey; Eli Mboho	12:13
Total length:				53:56

== Charts ==
=== Weekly charts ===
Weekly chart performance for Overflow
Chart (2024)	Peak position
US Top Christian Albums (Billboard)	1
US Top Gospel Albums (Billboard)	1
UK Top Album Downloads (Official Charts)	78

=== Year-end charts ===
Year-end chart performance for Overflow
Chart (2024)	Peak position
US Top Gospel Albums (Billboard)	29
