= Undefeated Champion =

2024 album by Transformation Worship

Studio album by Transformation Worship
- Released: November 15, 2024
- Genre: Christian contemporary; gospel; worship
- Length: 23:05
- Language: English
- Label: Represent Records

Transformation Worship chronology
Thy Kingdom Come (2024)	Undefeated Champion (2024)

Singles from Undefeated Champion
- 1. "Undefeated Champion" Released: October 15, 2024

Undefeated Champion is the fourth studio album by American Christian worship collective Transformation Worship. The album was released on November 15, 2024, through Represent Records. The title track was released as a single. The album reached number three on the Billboard Top Christian Albums chart and number one on the Top Gospel Albums chart.

== Track listing ==
No.	Title	Writer(s)	Producer(s)	Length
1.	"Undefeated Champion" (with Roosevelt Stewart and Graceson Todd)	Graceson Todd; Josiah Bassey; Mike Todd; Roosevelt Stewart; Zachariah Reid	Mike Todd; Josiah Bassey	4:45
2.	"The Weekend" (with Mike Teezy and Osby Berry)	Evan Devell Ford; Matt Marin; Mike Teezy; Mike Todd; Roosevelt Stewart	Mike Todd; Matt Marin; Javier Ordenes	2:38
3.	"Faith Talk"	Mike Todd	Mike Todd; Anthony Taylor Jr.	1:59
4.	"Crazy Faith" (with Pastor Mike Jr. and Mike Todd)	Evan Devell Ford; Graceson Todd; Josiah Bassey; Matt Marin; Mike Todd; Parris Chariz; Pastor Mike Jr.]]	Mike Todd; Josiah Bassey; Evan Devell Ford	3:43
5.	"Overflow – Remix" (with Alex Jean, Caleb Gordon and Dante' Pride)	Alex Jean; Caleb Gordon; Ivan Dante Pride Jr.	Mike Todd; Matt Marin	2:53
6.	"Glow Girl" (with Majaste Pearson and Mike Todd)	Graceson Todd; Jalisa Faye; Josiah Bassey; LeShandria Taylot; Mike Todd	Mike Todd; Josiah Bassey	3:22
7.	"History in the Making" (with Jalisa Faye, Jor'dan Armstrong, Josiah Bassey, Mike Todd, Miles Minnick and Parris Chariz)	Joseph Jordan Armstrong; Josiah Bassey; Mike Todd; Miles Minnick; Parris Chariz	Mike Todd; Josiah Bassey	3:43
Total length:				23:05

== Charts ==
Weekly chart performance for Undefeated Champion
Chart (2024)	Peak position
US Top Christian Albums (Billboard)	3
US Top Gospel Albums (Billboard)	1

Year-end chart performance for Undefeated Champion
Chart (2025)	Position
US Top Gospel Albums (Billboard)	13
