= Judas (Josiah Queen song) =

Single by Josiah Queen

from the album Damascus Road
- Released: March 20, 2026
- Genre: Christian; folk rock
- Length: 3:31
- Label: Capitol CMG; F&L
- Songwriters: Dylan Thomas; John Michael Howell; Queen; Zac Lawson
- Producers: Thomas; Howell

Josiah Queen singles chronology
"Demons" (2026)	"Judas" (2026)	"Make Heaven Crowded" (2026)

Music video
- "Judas" (lyrics) on YouTube

"Judas" (stylized in all lowercase) is a song recorded by the American Christian musician Josiah Queen. The song was released as a single on March 20, 2026, via Capitol Christian Music Group and F&L Music Group. It was written by Queen alongside Dylan Thomas, John Michael Howell, and Zac Lawson, while Howell produced.

== Release and promotion ==
"Judas" was teased to social media prior to its release, where the song received "strong buzz" due to "[resonating] widely with listeners online". Following the release of several such teasers, Queen later announced the single's official release date. Upon the song's release, a lyric video was uploaded to YouTube.

== Writing and development ==
"Judas" is themed around the story of Judas Iscariot. Iscariot was a person present in the Gospels, best known as being one of the original Twelve Apostles of Jesus, before assisting in Jesus' arrest in exchange for payment. Josiah themed the song around Iscariot in attempt to "illuminate [Scripture's] emotional core". The song places the listener into the same position as Iscariot's, to emphasize that "betrayal isn't confined to villains like Judas — it's a flaw shared by anyone capable of turning away from faith". Several critics noted the song's introspective and vulnerable lyrics. "Judas" has been described as "soul‑stirring" and "deeply moving". Instead of retelling Iscariot's story entirely, the track "challenges audiences to see themselves in it". In the song's writing, Queen "doesn't treat Judas as a distant villain", but instead uses the narrative as "a window into the heart of Jesus — a Savior who knew betrayal was coming and still chose the cross".

"Judas" is composed in the key of B-flat, with a speed of 111 beats per minute and a key signature of 4/4. It demonstrates the styles of Christian music and folk rock. Jesus Freak Hideout observed that the song contains "galloping guitar riffs, breakneck banjo lines, and furiously pounding drums", as well as a "larger‑than‑life chorus". The track implements minimalist and somber production styles to create "a vulnerable atmosphere".

== Commercial performance ==
Within its first charting frame, "Judas" debuted on the Billboard Hot Christian Songs and Hot Rock & Alternative Songs charts at numbers 10 and 32, respectively. Supportively, the track appeared at number 2 on the Christian Digital Song Sales chart, number 18 on the Christian Streaming Songs chart, and number 6 on the Rock Digital Song Sales chart.

== Track listing ==
All tracks are written by Dylan Thomas, John Michael Howell, Josiah Queen, and Zac Lawson.

No.	Title	Producer(s)	Length
1.	"Judas"	Dylan Thomas; John Michael Howell	3:31
2.	"Demons"	Howell	3:10
Total length:			6:41

== Personnel ==
Credits adapted from Spotify.

- Doug Weier – mixer
- Dylan Thomas – writer, programmer, engineer, vocals, guitar, bass, banjo, piano
- Jacob Arnold – drum kit
- John Michael Howell – writer, producer, vocals, guitar
- Josiah Queen – writer, vocals
- Mike Cervantes – master
- Zac Lawson – writer, vocals

== Charts ==
Chart performance for "Judas"
Chart (2026)	Peak position
Australian Christian Airplay (TCM)	10
US Hot Christian Songs (Billboard)	10
US Hot Rock & Alternative Songs (Billboard)	32

== Release history ==
Release history and formats for "Judas"
Region	Date	Format(s)	Label(s)	Ref.
Various	March 20, 2026	Digital download; streaming	Capitol CMG; F&L Music Group	
