= Washed =

Single by Elevation Rhythm

from the album Washed
- Released: September 19, 2025
- Length: 4:05
- Label: Elevation Worship Records
- Songwriters: Joe L. Barnes; Joshua Holiday; Mitch Wong; Steven Furtick
- Producer: Holiday

Elevation Rhythm singles chronology
"Believe It" (2025)	"Washed" (2025)	"Thank God I'm Free" (2026)

Music video
- "Washed" on YouTube

"Washed" is a song recorded live by the American Christian music collective Elevation Rhythm. The song was released on September 19, 2025, through Elevation Worship Records, to digital download and streaming formats. It was written by Joe L. Barnes, Joshua Holiday, Mitch Wong, and Steven Furtick, while Holiday produced. "Washed" peaked at number 97 on the Billboard Hot 100 and number 1 on the Hot Christian Songs chart.

== Release and promotion ==
"Washed" was announced through "a steady drumroll of teasers" on Instagram Reels several days prior to its official release. The track was first released to digital download and streaming formats on September 19, 2025, via Elevation Worship Records. It was published by Elevation Worship Publishing, Original Wong Publishing, and Bell Music Publishing. With the release, the song was supported with the release of an official live music video, which was uploaded to YouTube. The song began impacting Christian radio in the United States by January 2026, although it was not until April 9, 2026, that the track was officially released to that format. In promotion of the song's release, Holiday publicly stated the meaning behind the song, saying:

The message of being made clean through the cross collides with these bright, guitar-pop sonics that feel fun, free, and full of life. It's worshipful, but it also makes you want to move... our hope is that people carry it like an anthem — something they don't just sing, but believe and celebrate in their everyday lives.

— Josh Holiday of Elevation Church

== Style ==
Air1's Scott Savage observed that the song contains "energetic personality and positive vibes". He also noted that "the most common word used is 'hallelujah' ", emphasizing the song's theme of praise. Writing for the same publication, Lindsay Williams described it as a "bouncy singalong". Jessie Clarks of The Christian Beat described the track as a "joyful, high-energy anthem". Niagara Frontier noted that the track "celebrates redemption and freedom", "inviting listeners" to do the same. "Washed" is led by Nate Diaz. The song is composed in the key of B, with a speed of 139 beats per minute and a time signature of 4/4. It runs for a duration of 4 minutes and 5 seconds.

== Reception ==
=== Commercial ===
In its first charting frame, "Washed" debuted upon the Billboard Hot Christian Songs chart at number 22. In January 2026, the song began to impact Christian radio, and entered the Christian Airplay chart at number 37. The following month it went on to enter the Christian Adult Contemporary chart at number 25, and the Christian Streaming Songs chart at number 23. Over the span of the next several months, the track went on to rise to numbers 7, 15, 13, and 11 on the Hot Christian Songs, Christian Airplay, Christian Adult Contemporary, and Christian Streaming Songs charts, respectively. In September 2026, "Washed" entered the Billboard Hot 100 at number 97.

=== Accolades ===
Year	Organization	Category	Result	Ref.
2026	K-Love Fan Awards	Worship Song of the Year	Nominated	
2026	Dove Awards	Pop/Contemporary Recorded Song of the Year	Nominated	
2026	ASCAP Awards	Most Performed Christian Songs	Honored	

== Personnel ==
Credits adapted from Tidal.

Production

- Alex Youngs – engineer
- Dustin Maxwell – engineer
- Graham King – engineer
- Ian Womback – engineer
- Jack Nellis – masterer
- Joe L. Barnes – writer
- Johnny Buffum – engineer
- Jonathan Mix – engineer
- Josh Holiday – producer, writer, programmer
- Josie Flores Cardenas – engineer
- Mitch Wong – writer
- Marco Cargnelutti – engineer
- Mike Cervantes – mixer
- Nate Diaz – engineer
- Steven Furtick – writer, executive producer
- William Oakley – engineer
- Zach King – engineer

Performers

- Bailey Waldo – background vocals
- Believe Kamba – background vocals
- Britt Diaz – background vocals
- Brody Still – background vocals
- Christopher Lopez – background vocals
- Daniel Pena – background vocals
- E. Edwards – guitar
- Elise Ferris – background vocals
- Hannah Cheshire – background vocals
- Ian Womback – background vocals
- Josh Holiday – keyboards
- Josiah Turner – background vocals
- Madelyn Turner – background vocals
- Naomi Robertson – background vocals
- Nate Diaz – lead vocals
- Nick Edwards – bass
- Otis Williams – drums
- Rachel Schumann – background vocals
- Raffaella Oropeza – background vocals
- Scott Gardner – organ
- Taylor Thomas – background vocals
- Tony Lambright Jr. – percussion
- Zach King – background vocals
- Zoey Deel – background vocals

== Charts ==
Chart performance for "Washed"
Chart (2025–2026)	Peak position
US Billboard Hot 100	97
US Christian Airplay (Billboard)	1
US Hot Christian Songs (Billboard)	1

== Certifications ==
Certifications for "Washed"
Region	Certification	Certified units/sales
United States (RIAA)	Gold	500,000^{‡}
^{‡} Sales+streaming figures based on certification alone.

== Release history ==
Release history and formats for "Washed"
Region	Date	Format(s)	Label(s)	Ref.
Various	September 19, 2025	Digital download; streaming	Elevation Worship Records	
Various	December 2025	CD	DayWind Music Group	
United States	April 9, 2026	Christian radio	Elevation Worship Records	
