= Practice management =

Practice management is the term used in General practice for the person who manages the finance and administration of a doctor's office or an office of a medical professional in one of many types of specialties in medicine. This is distinct from other official titles such as Advanced Practice Manager, which are generally clinical. A practice manager is responsible for the administrative responsibilities of daily operations and development of a business strategy. Most practice managers are responsible for hiring staff, negotiating benefits and personnel policies, ensuring that medical supplies are ordered and equipment is maintained, ensuring regulatory compliance, and the development and marketing of service lines. Practice management encompasses multiple topics including governance, the financial aspects of medical billing, staff management, ancillary service development, information technology, transcription utilization, and marketing. Practice managers handle the business aspects of medicine to maximize provider time and enhance patient care.

== General practice ==
The job of the practice manager has evolved over the last century. When general practice was a cottage industry, operating in the doctor's front room, the receptionist, and the manager, insofar as there was any management, was often the doctor's wife. In the 21st century the biggest practices in the UK now have more than 200,000 patients and hundreds of staff over dozens of sites. Some practices, however, are still single handed. Working conditions in rural areas are very different from those in cities. By no means all the jobs are full time. About half the practice managers surveyed in the UK reported working from five to eight additional hours per week, not all of it paid. Average salary was £39,334.17

The role of a practice manager often includes managing the patient recall process for preventative healthcare appointments. In the UK, primary care providers must meet QOF targets and Local Enhanced Services. Much of the work of practice managers over the financial year goes towards meeting these targets as they are a key generator of practice revenue. As an important of preventing ill-health, there has been much academic research into improving the uptake of these targeted appointments. For example, there has been a number of studies into improving uptake of the NHS Health Check programme.

== Accounting Practice Management ==
Accounting practice management is the process of managing and optimizing an accounting practice. This is typically done through the use of an accounting practice management software. An accounting practice management software is specific to accounting firms and helps accountants manage all the big and little aspects of their accounting practice.

Different accounting practice management software offer different features. At a high level, however, an accounting practice management software will help users:

- Track time and billing
- Expedite payment collection processes
- Use work codes and workflow to work more efficiently
- Manage client and project information
- Schedule and manage employee calendars
- Send mass mailing and emails to clients
- Run reports on various projects
- Better understand overall firm health

While there are many different general practice management software available, many accountants choose to use a specialized accounting practice management software. This provides access to unique tools and features that are specifically designed for accountants.

== Veterinary practice ==
The same role exists in veterinary practice.

The work of practice managers is varied but generally includes:

- personnel administration
- payroll
- finance
- strategic planning
- Information technology.

== See also ==
Health administration Institute of General Practice Management
