= Dominion (Transformation Worship album) =

Studio album by Transformation Worship
- Released: July 12, 2024
- Genre: Christian contemporary; gospel; worship
- Length: 39:28
- Language: English
- Label: Represent
- Producer: Mike TOdd; Javier Ordenes; Matthew Lee Marin; Zachariah Reid; Eli Mboho; Eric W. Catron; Matthew Ramsey; Josiah Bassey

Transformation Worship chronology
Overflow (2024)	Dominion (2024)	Thy Kingdom Come (2024)

Singles from Dominion
- 1. "Dominion" Released: June 14, 2024

Dominion is the second studio album by American Christian worship collective Transformation Worship. The album was released on July 12, 2024, through Represent Records. The title track was released as a single. The album reached number two on the Billboard Top Christian Albums chart and number one on the Top Gospel Albums chart.

At the 2025 GMA Dove Awards, the album was nominated for Contemporary Gospel Album of the Year.

== Track listing ==
No.	Title	Writer(s)	Producer(s)	Length
1.	"Dominion" (with Mike Todd and Osby Berry)	Caleb Sean McCampbell; Grason Todd; Mike Todd	Mike Todd; Javier Ordenes; Matthew Lee Marin; Zachariah Reid; Eli Mboho; Eric W. Catron; Matthew Ramsey	8:36
2.	"Look At My Fruit" (with Prinx Emmanuel)	Charles Henry Metcalf; Destiny Joy Crockett; Eli Mboho; Elizabeth Rosa; Josiah Bassey; Mike Todd; Osby Berry; Roosevelt Stewert	Mike Todd; Josiah Bassey	3:26
3.	"Yours" (with Elizabeth Rosa and Kandace Duke)	Charles Henry Metcalf; Destiny Crockett; Elizabeth Rosa; Josiah Bassey; Mike Todd; Osby Berry; Roosevelt Stewart	Mike Todd; Josiah Bassey; Matthew lee Marin	3:52
4.	"Cover Me" (with Osby Berry and Josiah Bassey)	Josiah Bassey	Josiah Bassey; Matthew Ramsey; Matthew Lee Marin	3:27
5.	"Submit" (with Christian Spaulding and Majaste Pearson)	Josiah Bassey; Mike Todd	Josiah Bassey; Zachariah Reid; Matthew Lee Marin	2:48
6.	"Never Fail" (with Tim Godfrey, Roosevelt Stweart and Josiah Bassey)	Eli Mboho; Josiah Bassey; Mike Todd; Roosevelt Stewart	Josiah Bassey; Mike Todd; Eli Mboho	4:41
7.	"Ages Past"	Destiny Joy Crockett; Eli Mboho; Josiah Bassey; Mike Todd; Roosevelt Stewart; Wale Adenuga	Mike Todd; Eli Mboho; Eric W. Catron; Zachariah Reid; Matthew Lee Marin	12:34
Total length:				39:28

== Charts ==
=== Weekly charts ===
Weekly chart performance for Dominion
Chart (2024)	Peak position
US Top Christian Albums (Billboard)	2
US Top Gospel Albums (Billboard)	1

=== Year-end charts ===
Year-end chart performance for Dominion
Chart (2024)	Peak position
US Top Gospel Albums (Billboard)	40
