= Leanna Crawford =

American singer-songwriter

- Born: June 13, 1995 (age 31)
- Origin: Stanwood, Washington, U.S.
- Genre: CCM
- Occupation: Singer-songwriter
- Instruments: Vocals; ukulele; guitar; piano
- Label: Provident Label Group
- Spouse: Cody Zeller (m. 2023)
- Website: leannacrawford.com

Leanna Crawford (born June 13, 1995) is an American contemporary Christian music singer-songwriter signed to Provident Label Group.

== Background ==
Leanna Crawford grew up in Stanwood, Washington. She and her two sisters and brother were homeschooled by her mother, a former teacher. She worked as an assistant horse trainer for her older sister. She received a music business degree from Northwest University in Kirkland, Washington.

In 2012, Crawford went on a mission trip, where she says that God spoke to her, calling her into music ministry. In 2013 she won Praise106.5's Music Search with her song, "Moment by Moment", produced by Dove Award-winning producer, Ed Cash.

== Career ==
Soon after moving to Nashville, Crawford was signed as the first female artist to Story House Collective's roster by Matthew West, a Grammy nominated artist and Dove Award winner. Since then she has toured with Michael W. Smith, West, Jeremy Camp, Tenth Avenue North, Matt Maher, Plumb, and Jordan Feliz.

In 2018, Crawford released a six-song EP titled Crazy Beautiful You in 2018 and a two-track Christmas single. In October 2019, she signed to Provident Label Group/Story House Music. "Funeral" was the first radio single released from Crawford's EP which came out May 2020. The next single, “Truth I’m Standing On” was a Top 30 song on the Billboard Christian Airplay chart. The latest single from the EP is "Mean Girls" and it was in the Top 20 on the Billboard Christian Airplay chart. She was a nominee as Female Artist of the Year at the 2021 K-Love Fan Awards. Crawford won Breakout Single of the Year for her song Still Waters (Psalm 23) as the 2025 K-Love Fan Awards.

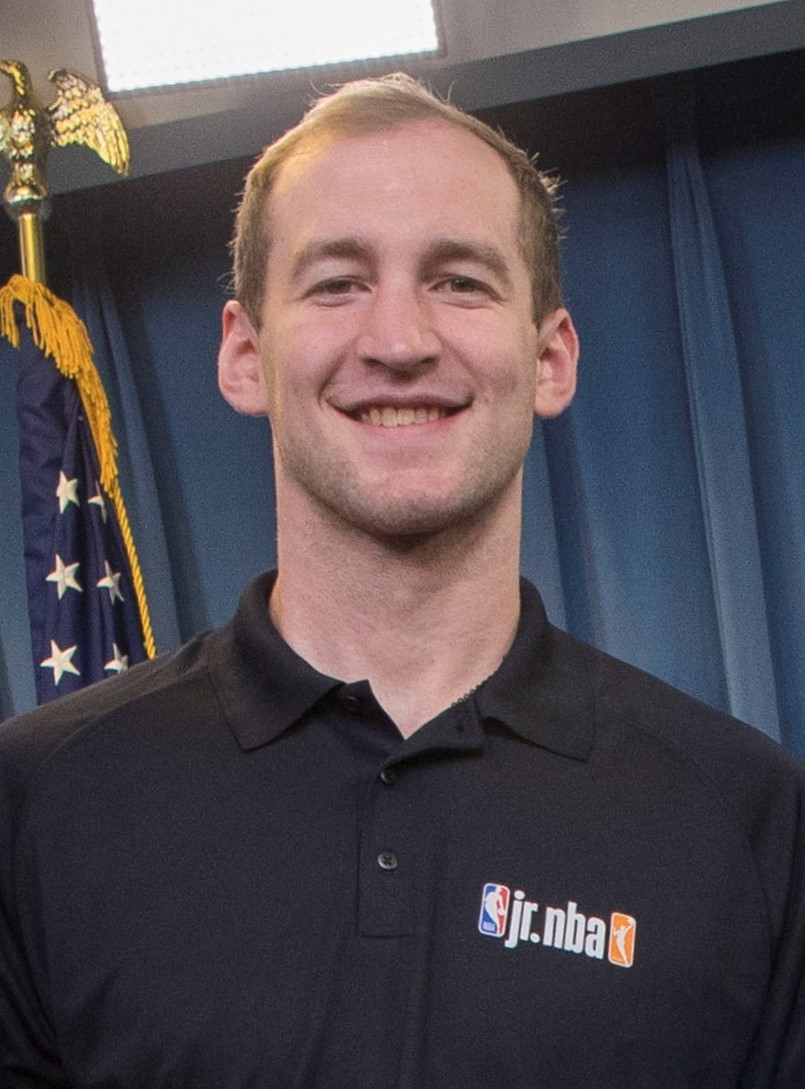
Crawford's husband, Cody Zeller

== Personal life ==
Crawford and Cody Zeller were engaged in June 2022 and they married at Nashville's Schermerhorn Symphony Center on August 26, 2023. They live in Nashville.

== Discography ==
=== Studio albums ===
Title	Details	Peak chart positions	
Title	Details	US Current	US Christ
Still Waters	Released: July 19, 2024; Label: Provident Label Group; Formats: CD, digital download, streaming	46	7
Thank God	Released: July 24, 2026; Label: Provident; Formats: CD, LP, digital download, streaming	—	11
"—" denotes a recording that did not chart or was not released in that territory.

=== Extended plays ===
Title	Details
Crazy Beautiful You	Released: January 19, 2018; Label: Story House Collective; Formats: digital download, streaming
Leanna Crawford	Released: May 1, 2020; Label: Provident Label Group; Formats: digital download, streaming

=== Singles ===
Title	Year	Peak chart positions						Certifications (sales threshold)	Album
Title	Year	US Christ	US Christ Airplay	US Christ AC	US Christ. Digital	US Christ. Stream.	UK Cross	Certifications (sales threshold)	Album
"Christmas Dreamin'"	2018	—	42	27	—	—	—		Non-album single
"Funeral"	2020	—	45	—	—	—	—		Leanna Crawford (EP)
"Truth I'm Standing On"	2020	24	21	17	—	—	11		Leanna Crawford (EP)
"Mean Girls" (with Jekalyn Carr)	2021	29	20	—	—	—	30		Leanna Crawford (EP)
"What You Can't Forget"	2021	—	—	—	—	—	—		Non-album singles
"Breath of Heaven (Mary's Song"	2021	—	—	—	—	—	—		Non-album singles
"Before I Knew Jesus"	2022	—	—	—	—	—	—		Still Waters
"How Can You Not"	2022	36	21	18	—	—	—		Still Waters
"Simple"	2022	—	—	—	—	—	69		Still Waters
"Make It Through"	2023	—	—	—	—	—	—		Still Waters
"Jesus Is"	2023	—	—	—	—	—	—		Still Waters
"I Know a Place"	2023	—	31	28	—	—	81		Still Waters
"Vow to Be Yours"	2024	—	—	—	—	—	—		Still Waters
"Still Waters (Psalm 23)"	2024	7	11	8	1	20	—	RIAA: Gold	Still Waters
"We Sing (Joy to the World)" (with Seph Schlueter)	2024	18	14	9	—	—	—		Non-album single
"Borrow Mine"	2025	—	—	—	—	—	—		Thank God
"Thank God"	2026	9	3	3	—	—	—		Thank God
"—" denotes a recording that did not chart or was not released in that territory.

=== Other charted songs ===
Title	Year	Peak chart positions			Album
Title	Year	US Christ	US Christ Air	US Christ AC	Album
"Honest"	2025	21	9	9	Still Waters
"Her"	2026	46	—	—	Thank God

== Tours ==
=== As main act ===
- Still Waters Tour with Cade Thompson (2025)
- Sisterhood Tour with Riley Clemmons and Madison Watkins (2025)
