= Transformation Worship =

American Christian worship band

- Origin: Tulsa, Oklahoma
- Genres: Worship, gospel, Christian contemporary
- Years active: 2022–present
- Label: Represent Records

Transformation Worship is an American Christian worship band from Tulsa, Oklahoma. They are a collective, signed to Represent Records. The group is credited by Billboard as being the first artist to achieve three No. 1 charting albums in one year.

On May 17, 2024, they released their debut studio album, Overflow. The album reached No. 1 on the Billboard Top Christian Albums chart and Top Gospel Albums, and No. 78 on the Official Charts UK Album Downloads chart. It was followed by Dominion, released on July 12, 2024, which reached No. 2 on the Billboard Top Christian Albums and No. 1 on the Top Gospel Albums chart. Their third studio album, Thy Kingdom Come, was released September 20, 2024, and achieved No, 23 on the Billboard Top Christian Albums chart and No. 6 on the Top Gospel Albums chart. On November 15, 2024, the band released Undefeated Champion, which reached No. 3 on the Top Christian Albums chart and No. 1 on the Billboard Top Gospel Albums chart.

== Discography ==
=== Studio albums ===
Title	Details	Peak chart positions				Sales
Title	Details	US Top	US Christ.	US Gospel	UK Down.	Sales
Overflow: The Album	Released: May 17, 2024; Label: Represent Records; Formats: Digital download, streaming	14	1	1	78	US: 6,000
Dominion	Released: July 12, 2024; Label: Represent; Formats: Digital download, streaming	21	2	1	—	
Thy Kingdom Come	Released: September 20, 2024; Label: Represent; Formats: Digital download, streaming	—	23	6	—	
Undefeated Champion	Released: November 15, 2024; Label: Represent; Formats: Digital download, streaming	35	3	1	—	
"—" denotes a recording that did not chart or was not released in that territory.

=== EPs ===
Title	Details	Peak chart positions
Title	Details	US Gospel
Holy Is Here	Released: May 26, 2023; Label: Represent; Formats: Digital download, streaming	—
Faith in the Fire	Released: October 24, 2025; Label: Represent; Formats: Digital download, streaming	8
Bloodline	Released: October 23, 2026; Label: Represent; Formats: Digital download, streaming	8
"—" denotes a recording that did not chart or was not released in that territory.

=== Singles ===
Title	Year	Peak Chart Positions			Album
Title	Year	US Digital	US Gospel	US Gospel Digital	Album
"Eagle" (with KB)	2022	17	12	1	Thy Kingdom Come
"I Will"	2023	—	—	—	Overflow
"Miracles"	2023	—	—	13	Non-album single
"Most High"	2023	—	—	—	Thy Kingdom Come
"Overflow" (with Todd Dulaney)	2024	16	6	1	Overflow
"Yahweh" (with Roosevelt Stewart and Elizabeth Rosa)	2024	—	—	2	Overflow
"Dominion" (with Osby Berry and Mike Todd)	2024	—	—	6	Dominion
"Rise" (with Graceson Todd)	2024	—	—	9	Dominion
"Reprise" (with Mike Todd)	2024	—	—	10	Dominion
"Sustain" (with Chandler Moore and Jekalyn Carr)	2024	—	—	—	Thy Kingdom Come
"Wait on You" (with Josiah Bassey)	2024	—	—	—	Thy Kingdom Come
"Undefeated Champion" (with Roosevelt Stewart and Graceson Todd)	2024	—	—	—	Undefeated Champion
"King is Alive" (with Elizabeth Faith Rosa, Roosevelt Stewart, and Christian Spaulding)	2025	—	—	10	Non-album singles
"BLUE Purple RED" (with the Kingdom Corner and Kemi$ama)	2025	—	—	—	Non-album singles
"Sign Me Up" (with Christian Spaulding and Roosevelt Stewart)	2025	—	—	—	Non-album singles
"Let Him Cook" (with Roosevelt Stewart, Lecrae and Mike Todd)	2025	—	—	—	Faith in the Fire
"—" denotes a recording that did not chart or was not released in that territory.
