= The Prodigal (Josiah Queen song) =

Single by Josiah Queen

from the album The Prodigal
- Released: September 1, 2023
- Length: 3:13
- Label: F&L Music Group; Josiah Queen Music
- Songwriters: Jared Marc; Josiah Queen
- Producer: Josiah Queen

Josiah Queen singles chronology
"Fishes and Loaves" (2023)	"The Prodigal" (2023)	"Garden in Manhattan" (2023)

Music video
- "The Prodigal" on YouTube

"The Prodigal" is a single by American folk rock musician Josiah Queen. The song was released on September 1, 2023, through F&L Music Group and Josiah Queen Music. It was used as the title track for Queen's 2024 record-breaking debut studio album, The Prodigal, which achieved a peak of No. 1 on the Billboard Top Christian Albums, and is credited as the biggest streaming debut album in Contemporary Christian music history. On December 9, 2025, the song was certified Platinum by the Recording Industry Association of America for selling at least 1,000,000 copies within the United States. In February 2024, the song achieved over 20 million digital streams in one week.

== Background ==
Queen spoke about the song, "We've all been at a point in our lives at one time where we tried to find satisfaction in money or fame or all of those things, but the truth is that nothing else can satisfy the desires in our heart except for being in the presence of God. If you're sick and tired of being sick and tired, this song's for you." The song is a reference to the Parable of the Prodigal Son from the Bible.

"The Prodigal" was written by Queen and Jared Marc. On August 31, 2023, an official lyric video was released for the song. On June 2, 2024, Queen performed the song at the Grand Ole Opry.

The song's style has been described as pop, folk, and acoustic. Queen stated that the song's style was mainly influenced by the style of Zach Bryan.

On November 22, 2024, a remixed version of the song was released, title "The Prodigal (Oasis Coffee Session)". The song was included on the deluxe edition of his album, The Prodigal.

== Commercial performance ==
"The Prodigal" performed significantly on charts. The song reached No. 4 on the Billboard Hot Christian Songs chart, No. 15 on the Christian Airplay chart, No. 10 on the Christian Adult Contemporary Airplay chart, No. 3 on the Christian Digital Song Sales chart, and No. 3 on the Christian Streaming Songs chart. Additionally, the song reached No. 27 on the Billboard Hot Rock & Alternative Songs, and No. 10 on the Adult Contemporary Airplay. At its peak, the song achieved 2.2 million on airplay audience and 1.8 million digital streams in one week.

On the year-end charts of 2024, "The Prodigal" achieved No. 4 on the Hot Christian Songs chart, No. 35 on the Christian Airplay, No. 25 on the Christian Adult Contemporary Airplay, and No. 13 on the Christian Streaming Songs.

== Accolades ==
"The Prodigal" was nominated for Pop/Contemporary Recorded Song of the Year at the 2024 GMA Dove Awards. That year, the song was also nominated for Breakout Single of the Year at the K-Love Fan Awards.

On March 31, 2025, it was certified gold by the Recording Industry Association of America for selling at least 500,000 copies in the United States.

Year	Organization	Category	Result	Ref.
2024	Billboard Music Awards	Top Christian Song	Nominated	
2024	GMA Dove Awards	Pop/Contemporary Recorded Song of the Year	Nominated	
2024	We Love Awards	Song of the Year	Nominated	
2025	GMA Dove Awards	Song of the Year	Nominated	

== Charts ==
=== Weekly charts ===
Weekly chart performance for "The Prodigal"
Chart (2024–25)	Peak position
Australian Christian Airplay (TCM)	15
UK Christian Airplay (Cross Rhythms)	1
US Christian Airplay (Billboard)	15
US Hot Christian Songs (Billboard)	4
US Hot Rock & Alternative Songs (Billboard)	27

=== Year-end charts ===
Year-end chart performance for "The Prodigal"
Chart (2024)	Position
Australian Christian Airplay (TCM)	77
US Christian Airplay (Billboard)	35
US Hot Christian Songs (Billboard)	4
Chart (2025)	Position
UK Christian Songs (Cross Rhythms)	19

== Certifications ==
Certifications for "The Prodigal"
Region	Certification	Certified units/sales
United States (RIAA)	Platinum	1,000,000^{‡}
^{‡} Sales+streaming figures based on certification alone.
