= Emmanuel Espinosa =

- Born: Emmanuel Espinosa Miranda; December 5, 1975 (age 50); Hermosillo, Sonora, Mexico
- Genres: CCM, Rock, Pop, Gospel
- Occupations: Musician, singer, songwriter
- Instruments: Bass, Guitar, Piano, Drums, Vocalist
- Years active: 1994–present
- Labels: CanZion Productions; Reyvol Records; Pulso Records
- Member of: Rojo

Emmanuel Espinosa (born December 5, 1975) is a Mexican Christian musician, singer and songwriter. He is the founder and bassist of Christian rock band Rojo, along with his wife Linda (lead vocals).

== Biography ==
Espinosa was born on December 5, 1975 in Hermosillo, Sonora, Mexico. His parents were both pastors at a local church where he began to play drums and guitar. He also started working with his older brother, Luis Enrique Espinosa, who is also a renowned Christian singer in the Latin community, and when Emmanuel was 13 years old, he recorded with him.

During his teens, he met Rubén Gonzalez, whom later would be part of his future band. When he was 17, he moved to Mexico City to study music. After studying for six months, he moved to Durango to work in CanZion Productions and travel as Marcos Witt bassist. Meanwhile, he was also working as producer, arranger, composer, and recorded for Witt, Danilo Montero, and Jesús Adrián Romero, among others.

At the end of the 1990s, Espinosa joined Gonzalez and started shaping up his own musical project. After recruiting guitarist Oswaldo Burruel and singer Annette Moreno, they officially formed Rojo in 2000. With the band, Espinosa has enjoyed critical praise and success as the band has been nominated to several awards, including Latin Grammy and Dove Awards.

In 2007, Espinosa published a book called "Enseñame a Vivir" (English: "Teach Me to Live") in which he shares how to live a life surrendered, of service and devotion to God.

Espinosa currently leads Pulso Records, a division of CanZion Productions.

== Personal life ==
Espinosa is married to Linda Moreno and they have four sons together. The oldest three, Angelo, Michael, and Eric are the members of indie Christian band Strings & Heart. The couple began fostering their youngest, David, when he was five days old; his adoption was finalized in 2022.

== Awards ==
- 2003, Arpa Award for Songwriter of the Year
- 2009, Arpa Award for Producer of the Year
