= SEU Worship =

American Christian synth pop band

- Origin: Lakeland, Florida, United States
- Genres: Contemporary worship; CCM; Synth-pop
- Years active: 2010–present
- Labels: Provident Label Group, Essential Worship, Sony Music
- Members: David Ryan Cook; Kenzie Walker; Sydney James; Chelsea Plank; Jacob Lynch
- Past members: Dan Rivera; Chase Wagner; Dylan Dames; Trevor Panarello; Bobby Walker; Tessaria
- Website: seuworship.com

SEU Worship is an American contemporary worship music collective from Southeastern University in Lakeland, Florida. The group consists of several students and alumni of different areas of the university who are in charge of performing and writing the songs that are mainly focused on the weekly chapels. The band is signed to Essential Worship and Provident Label Group.

== History ==
Their first release was the Live album No Other Name on 2013. Since then they have released 12 albums, 3 extended plays, 35 total EPs and singles, 2 albums in spanish and 1 EP in spanish.

== Musical style ==
The band mostly creates pop music, emphasizing on prophetic lyrics.

== Discography ==
=== Albums ===
==== Studio albums ====
Title	Details
So All the World Will Know	Released: February 11, 2014; Label: Independent; Formats: Digital download, streaming
A Thousand Generations	Released: June 19, 2020; Label: Provident Label Group, Sony Music Entertainment; Formats: CD, digital download, streaming
Walk with You	Released: February 4, 2022; Label: Provident, Sony; Formats: Digital download, streaming
Heart Cry	Released: September 30, 2022; Label: Provident, Sony; Formats: Digital download, streaming
A Forgiving God	Released: June 27, 2026; Label: Provident, Sony; Formats: Digital download, streaming

==== Live albums ====
Title	Details	Peak chart positions
Title	Details	US Christ.
For This Purpose	Released: February 8, 2016; Label: Independent; Formats: Digital download, streaming	—
SEU Worship	Released: February 10, 2017; Label: Independent; Formats: Digital download, streaming	—
Move of God	Released: June 7, 2024; Label: Provident, Sony; Formats: CD, digital download, streaming	—
Found in the Field	Released: September 4, 2026; Label: Provident, Sony; Formats: CD, digital download, streaming	25
"—" denotes a recording that did not chart or was not released in that territory.

=== Extended plays ===
Title	Details
From the Vanguard Room	Released: August 20, 2013; Label: Independent; Formats: Digital download, streaming
Born to Run	Released: November 3, 2017; Label: Independent; Formats: Digital download, streaming
Eden to Eternity	Released: February 7, 2022; Label: Provident, Sony; Formats: Digital download, streaming
Songs We've Been Meaning to Release	Released: March 14, 2025; Label: Provident, Sony; Formats: Digital download, streaming
What a God	Released: October 31, 2025; Label: Provident, Sony, Southeastern University; Formats: CD, digital download, streaming

=== Charted singles ===
Title	Year	Peak chart positions		Album
Title	Year	US Christ.	US Christ. Air.	Album
"What a God" (featuring Abbie Gamboa and Chelsea Plank)	2025	14	28	Move of God
"What a God" (live from JOGS) (featuring Abbie Gamboa and Chelsea Plank)	2025	31	—	What a God (EP)
"Wild Rushing Wind" (featuring Caylie Bryant)	2026	36	—	Found in the Field
"—" denotes a recording that did not chart or was not released in that territory.

=== Other charted songs ===
Title	Year	Peak chart positions	Album
Title	Year	US Christ.	Album
"Bless the Blood" (featuring Chelsea Plank)	2026	29	Found in the Field

== Accolades ==
Year	Organization	Nominee / work	Category	Result	Ref.
2026	Dove Awards	SEU Worship	New Artist of the Year	Pending	
2026	Dove Awards	A Forgiving God	Worship Album of the Year	Pending	
