= Yahweh (album) =

Live album by Hillsong Worship
- Released: 26 October 2010
- Recorded: March 2010; Hillsong Chapel, Sydney, Australia
- Genre: Contemporary worship
- Length: 65:05
- Label: Hillsong, EMI

Hillsong Music Australia Hillsong Chapel Series chronology
Yahweh (2010)	Forever Reign (2012)

Deluxe Edition
- Deluxe Digital Edition

Yahweh(GOD) is the first installment in the Hillsong Chapel praise and worship series by Hillsong Church, which was released in Australia on 26 October 2010 by Hillsong Music Australia in partnership with EMI. It was recorded live in the church's Sydney chapel in March 2010. The album peaked in the Top 100 on the ARIA Albums Chart. A companion DVD was also filmed and released at the same time.

== History and recording ==
Hillsong Chapel is an intimate and devotional collection of Hillsong songs, both recent and beloved, from Hillsong Worship and Hillsong United. Recorded live in the church's chapel in March 2010, Yahweh, contains 13 organic and contemplative versions of top Christian Copyright Licensing International (CCLI) songs such as "Hosanna", "From the Inside Out" and the No. 1 CCLI song sung by an estimated 40 million people every week in church services around the world, "Mighty to Save". Although having never recorded an "unplugged" version of their songs, Reuben Morgan, Jill McCloghry, Ben Fielding, Joel Houston, Jad Gillies, Annie Garratt and other Hillsong team members crafted the brand new arrangements in response to churches around the world asking for acoustic versions of their popular anthems. The album was released in Australia on 26 October 2010 in partnership with EMI.

== Formats ==
A companion, full-length DVD featuring all the songs on the CD was also released and was filmed as 300 worshippers filled the Hillsong Chapel in Sydney, Australia.

== Track listing ==
Standard CD/DVD
No.	Title	Writer(s)	Original album appearance	Length
1.	"Hosanna"	Brooke Fraser	All of the Above	4:43
2.	"You'll Come"	Fraser	The I Heart Revolution: With Hearts as One	4:55
3.	"Run"	Joel Houston	This Is Our God	2:57
4.	"The Time Has Come"	Houston	United We Stand	5:27
5.	"Saviour King"	Marty Sampson, Mia Fieldes	All of the Above	5:25
6.	"Yahweh"	Reuben Morgan	Faith + Hope + Love	4:49
7.	"Came to My Rescue"	Sampson, Dylan Thomas, Joel Davies	United We Stand	4:20
8.	"Stronger"	Ben Fielding, Morgan	This Is Our God	4:10
9.	"This is Our God"	Morgan	This Is Our God	4:48
10.	"You Hold Me Now"	Matt Crocker, Morgan	Tear Down the Walls	7:28
11.	"From the Inside Out"	Houston	United We Stand	5:53
12.	"Mighty to Save"	Fielding, Morgan	Mighty to Save	5:11
13.	"Salvation is Here"	Houston	Look to You	4:53
Total length:				65:05

Deluxe edition DVD
No.	Title	Length
1.	"From the Inside Out"	6:05
2.	"Mighty to Save"	4:43
3.	"Salvation is Here"	4:52
4.	"Yahweh"	5:40
5.	"Stronger"	9:09

== Critical reception ==
- Bryan Ward, EMI CMG Label Group Director, said Hillsong Chapel's, Yahweh, was perfect for smaller gatherings and personal devotions and would help resource churches wanting more intimate worship expressions of songs from Hillsong Live and Hillsong United. He said: "Churches love the music from Hillsong Church, but are not always able to reproduce it in their local worship settings. The music from Hillsong Chapel provides another option for these churches to share these inspiring songs of praise."

Yahweh has received positive reviews from a number of music critics.

- AllMusic: "Yahweh represents the very best of what the modern worship community has to offer...A visionary and influential contribution to the modern worship canon that will be remembered for years to come."
- Gmclife.com: "The new series takes worship back to a simpler time when it wasn’t a movement or a genre but simply a way of praising our God...The new arrangements make for a more organic record, perfect as the background piece to someone’s personal devotions or for smaller congregations who didn’t find the originals a perfect fit."
- Soul-Audio.com calls the recording, "incredibly peaceful and wonderful."
