= Luke Munns =

Australian musician (born 1980)

- Born: Luke Andrew Munns; 20 September 1980 (age 45)
- Origin: Sydney, Australia
- Genres: Contemporary Christian music, contemporary worship music, rock
- Occupations: Musician, songwriter, record producer, audio engineer
- Instruments: Drums; percussion; vocals; guitar; piano
- Years active: 1998–present
- Labels: Hillsong Music; LUKAS
- Website: www.thelukasband.com

Luke Andrew Munns (born 20 September 1980) is an Australian songwriter, record producer, audio engineer. He was a founding member and the original drummer of Hillsong UNITED, performed on recordings by Hillsong Worship, and later became the leader of the Christian rock and worship group LUKAS, subsequently stylised as thelukasband.

== Biography ==
=== Early life ===
Munns began playing piano, and wrote his first song at the young age of three years, and focused his efforts to playing drums and guitar from the age of seven. He is the oldest of four brothers.

=== Hillsong Worship and Hillsong UNITED ===
Munns was the original drummer of Hillsong UNITED and performed with the group during its formative years. AllMusic credits him with drums, percussion, songwriting, production, engineering, programming, artwork, photography and cover art concepts across Hillsong Worship, Hillsong UNITED and Hillsong Kids recordings.

Munns wrote the song "Stay", released on the 1999 Hillsong Worship album By Your Side. Reviewing the album, Norman Smith of Cross Rhythms described "Stay" as an outstanding songwriting achievement and praised its melody and chorus. He also wrote "Your Spirit", released on Hillsong UNITED's 2001 live album King of Majesty.

The youth music group was initially known as United Live before adopting the Hillsong UNITED name. Munns's design portfolio credits him with creating the stylised UNITED logotype for 2002 album To the Ends of the Earth. The portfolio states that he removed the word "Live" from the previous branding to create the standalone UNITED identity. He is also credited with artwork on To the Ends of the Earth and More Than Life, photography on More Than Life, and cover art concepts for other Hillsong recordings.

=== Hillsong Kids ===
Munns has been nominated for two GMA Dove Awards for Children's Music Album of the Year for his music production work on Crazy Noise (2013), and Jesus Is My Super Hero (2006).

=== LUKAS and thelucasband ===
Photo of the band LUKAS

In Munns formed the band LUKAS in 2004, moving from drums to lead vocals, guitar and songwriting. In 2007, LUKAS and its song "Feels Like Home" were selected as one of six finalists in the Nokia Be Heard competition. The LUKAS single "Beauty for Ashes" received an eight-out-of-ten review from Cross Rhythms, describing Munns as the group's worship leader, songwriter, musician and producer.

LUKAS released the live EP and concert film Live at the Grove in 2015. The project received coverage from Cross Rhythms and reviews from Jesus Freak Hideout. In 2016, the group released "My Rescue" to raise funds and awareness for the anti-human-trafficking organisation A21. The song was performed on the Australian national television programme The Morning Show.

Under the name thelukasband, the group released the album Counter Culture in 2019. Munns and the band were later profiled by Singapore publication City News. In 2023, thelukasband, Munns and Andrew Hopkins released the single "In the Light". By July 2026, its music video had received more than six million views on YouTube. The single's Abandoned featuring Australian electronic music producer and DJ Northie (2013), For God So Loved (2014), Heaven On The Earth (2014), all debuted at number one on iTunes Inspirational Charts, Australia, and Beauty For Ashes reached number five.

Christopher Whitehall left the band in 2006 to frontman the indie pop band The Griswolds.

=== Other projects ===
In 2020, Munns served as creative director of The Blessing Australia, a collaborative recording which received more than 300 submissions from churches and Christian groups across Australia. In 2021, Munns served as the audio engineer for Brisbane recording sessions of the Plain English Version Bible, featuring Indigenous Australian readers. The project involved Bible Society Australia, Wycliffe Bible Translators and Shiloh Church.

Munns appeared as an interviewee in the Hillsong episode of the Paramount+ 2023 documentary series The Betoota Advocate Presents.

== Selected discography ==
Munns's Hillsong-era work included performance, songwriting, artwork and production-related contributions across Hillsong Worship, United Live and Hillsong UNITED projects.

=== Hillsong Worship ===
- By Your Side (1999)
- For This Cause (2000)
- You Are My World (2001)
- Blessed (2002)
- Hope (2003)
- For All You've Done (2004)
- UP: Unified Praise (2004, with Delirious?)

=== United Live and Hillsong UNITED ===
- One (1998 EP, packaged with Touching Heaven, Changing Earth)
- Everyday (1999)
- Best Friend (2000)
- King of Majesty (2001)
- To the Ends of the Earth (2002)
- More Than Life (2004)
- Look to You (2005)
- United We Stand (2006)
- The I Heart Revolution: With Hearts as One (2008)
- The I Heart Revolution: We're All in This Together (2009)

=== LUKAS and thelukasband ===
==== Albums ====
- LUKAS - You & Me EP (2007)
- Shine Your Glory (2009)
- 10 Year Anniversary (2014)
- "LUKAS - Live At The Grove Film & EP" (2015)
- Counter Culture (2019)

==== Singles ====
- "Beauty for Ashes" (2014)
- "Close to You" (2018)

=== Other appearances ===
- Mia Fieldes - There's A Reason (2007)
- Mia Fieldes - Minus The Walls (2008)
- GMF - Ride of Life (2008)
- Awakening '09 Conference intro music (2009)
- Everywoman Promo - Jack Diaz (2009)
- C3 - Send Down Your Love (2010)
- Presence Conference - Promo (2010)
- RICE Revolution Conference (2010)
- C3 - Undivided (2010)
- Loveis Album (2010)
- Abandoned Single Ft. Northie (2013)
