= The White Album (Hillsong United album) =

The White Album [a remix project]

Remix album by Hillsong United
- Released: 4 March 2014
- Recorded: 2013
- Genre: Contemporary worship music
- Length: 66:12
- Label: Hillsong Australia
- Producer: Joel Houston (Executive Producer)

Hillsong United chronology
Zion Acoustic Sessions (2013)	The White Album [a remix project] (2014)	Empires (2015)

The White Album is the first remix album by Australian contemporary worship music band Hillsong United. It was released on 4 March 2014. The album reached No. 48 on the Billboard 200 and also appeared on its component charts: No. 1 on Top Electronic Albums, No. 4 on Top Christian Albums and No. 22 on Top Digital Albums.

== Background ==
On 21 January, Hillsong UNITED posted the official cover artwork for the album, and announced that it would be available for Upfront members first. They posted "Excited to announce something new for us," making reference to their first remix project ever.

On 24 January, they announced the first remix available (on Upfront) "Like An Avalanche".

On 30 January, they posted the official track listing by uploading the back cover of the album.

The songs were made available for free. It is available from their website for $15.

== Reception ==
Professional ratings
Review scores
Source	Rating
AllMusic	3.5/5 stars
Cross Rhythms	9/10 stars
Indie Vision Music	3/5 stars

AllMusic's David Jeffries reviewed The White Album and found it was "Built for the 20-plus crowd that might crave a little synth with their CCM". The project takes the group's favourite track and "hands them over to producers and DJs for repurposing. The results are either expected yet spot-on or surprising plus very welcome". In May 2014 Stephen Curry of Cross Rhythms declared it "contains remixes of popular Hillsong United songs from various projects, giving them a new sound or twist in the process".

== Track listing ==
Standard edition
No.	Title	Writer(s)	Original album appearance	Length
1.	"With Everything" (Tim Yagolnikov Remix)	Joel Houston	This Is Our God	5:24
2.	"Scandal of Grace" (Chad Howat Remix)	Matt Crocker, Houston, Ben Tennikoff	Zion	4:58
3.	"Like An Avalanche" (Eric Owyoung Remix)	Houston, Dylan Thomas	Aftermath	4:16
4.	"Aftermath" (Chislett / Tennikoff Remix)	Houston	Aftermath	3:37
5.	"Aftermath" (Stacy King Remix)	Houston	Aftermath	2:07
6.	"Hosanna" (Tim Yagolnikov Remix)	Brooke Fraser	All of the Above	6:19
7.	"All I Need Is You / Came To My Rescue" (Medley / Lark Remix)	Marty Sampson, Thomas, Joel Davies	Look to You / United We Stand	4:54
8.	"From the Inside Out" (Black Rodeo Remix)	Houston	United We Stand	5:26
9.	"Search My Heart" (Solomon Olds Remix)	Crocker, Houston	Aftermath	4:33
10.	"The Stand" (Jeremy Edwardson Remix)	Houston	United We Stand	4:39
11.	"Oceans" (Lark Remix)	Crocker, Houston, Salomon Ligthelm	Zion	5:14
12.	"Love Is War" (Darren King Remix)	Houston	Zion	5:45
13.	"Where Feet May Fail" (HXLY KXSS Remix)	Crocker, Houston, Ligthelm	Zion (Remix of "Oceans")	4:55
14.	"Relentless" (Young and Free Remix)	Crocker, Houston	Zion	4:05
Total length:				66:12

== Charts ==
Chart (2014)	Peak position
Australian Albums (ARIA)	9
US Christian Albums (Billboard)	4
US Top Dance/Electronic Albums (Billboard)	1
