= Of Dirt and Grace: Live from the Land =

Live album and video album by Hillsong United
- Released: 15 July 2016
- Recorded: March 2016 in various places in Israel
- Genre: Contemporary worship music
- Length: 77:37
- Label: Hillsong, Sparrow, Capitol CMG
- Producer: Joel Houston, Michael Guy Chislett

Hillsong United chronology
Empires (2015)	Of Dirt and Grace: Live from the Land (2016)	Hillsong: Let Hope Rise (Original Motion Picture Soundtrack) (2016)

Singles from Of Dirt and Grace: Live from the Land
- 1. "Prince of Peace" Released: 1 July 2016

Of Dirt and Grace: Live from the Land is the thirteenth live album from Australian contemporary worship music band Hillsong United, a worship band from Hillsong Church. The album was released on 15 July 2016, under Hillsong Music, Sparrow Records and Capitol Christian Music Group. Touted as a "visual album", the record features new arrangements of their fourth studio album, Empires (2015), which were performed live and filmed around various locations in Israel. The album was also released in DVD on 29 July 2016. "Prince of Peace" was released as the album's lead single in July 2016.

== Background ==
Hillsong United previously took inspiration from the Sermon on the Mount and the Beatitudes for their fourth studio album, Empires (2015). The group wanted to film live performances of the song around places in Israel where the aforementioned events took place, as well as other Biblically historical locations. The album features new arrangements of the songs from Empires, as well as two tracks from Zion (2013), "Scandal of Grace" and "Oceans (Where Feet May Fail)", and the Hillsong Worship song "I Surrender" from Cornerstone (2012). While Empires featured "EDM pulses" throughout the album, Of Dirt and Grace features the tracks "decelerated into slow and pensive ballads." Of Dirt and Grace: Live from the Land differs from previous Hillsong United albums, due to the visual concept, the abundance of ballads, as well as the prominence of vocalist Taya Smith, who sings in half the album. Several members of the band wrote blog posts on Hillsong's website narrating their experiences while recording and filming the album.

== Promotion ==
On 21 June 2016, Hillsong United performed "Say the Word" on The Morning Show. On 1 July 2016, the live performance of "Prince of Peace" was released as an instant-grat single for those who pre-ordered the album, while its music video was released in Hillsong United's official website. The music video of the live performance of "Say the Word" was released on 14 July 2016.

== Reception ==
Giving Of Dirt and Grace four out of five stars, Lucas Munachen of Jesus Freak Hideout opined that the "slow build" of most of the songs "creates an ethereal atmosphere that sets its sight above", and called the usage of the filmed performances "an original concept that enhances the beauty of these songs even further." Timothy Yap of Hallels praised the visual album concept, stating, "While many worship albums serve to engage the ears, Of Dirt and Grace makes Jesus palatable through all our five senses. Ryan Loche of The Church Collective felt the new versions of the songs from Empires "[give] great ways to bring some of the synth-heavy songs from the past album to a more acoustic [worship] team." Phil Schneider of ChurchMag called the album "a beautiful album, a passionate and creative performance," adding, "As a live album, it’s sonically perfect. As a concept album, it’s intellectually inspiring. As a worship album, it’s both spiritually uplifting and challenging."

== Awards and accolades ==
On 9 August 2017, it was announced that Of Dirt and Grace would be nominated for a GMA Dove Award in the Long Form Video of the Year category at the 48th Annual GMA Dove Awards.

On 17 October 2017, Of Dirt and Grace won the GMA Dove Award for Long Form Video of the Year with director Joel Houston and David Rubie alongside producer Jason Strong being the receipts at a ceremony at Allen Arena in Nashville, Tennessee.

== Track listing ==
Standard edition
No.	Title	Writer(s)	Worship leader	Length
1.	"Here Now (Madness)" (by an empty tomb just beyond the city walls)	Joel Houston, Michael Guy Chislett	Joel Houston, Taya Smith, Jad Gillies	7:34
2.	"Say the Word" (from the mount of beatitudes)	Houston	Jad Gillies	3:43
3.	"Heart Like Heaven (Falling)" (as the sun went down over Galilee)	Matt Crocker, Houston	Matt Crocker	8:14
4.	"Touch the Sky" (from the lowest place on Earth and the cliffs of Arbel)	Houston, Dylan Thomas, Chislett	Taya Smith	4:05
5.	"Street Called Mercy" (from Via Dolorosa and a dead-end-road by the old Dead Sea Works)	Crocker, Houston	Jonathon Douglass, Taya Smith, Matt Crocker	3:57
6.	"When I Lost My Heart to You (Hallelujah)" (by fire in the hills of Galilee)	Houston	Taya Smith, Matt Crocker	8:21
7.	"Even When It Hurts (Praise Song)" (in the cold night of a not too distant war)	Houston	Taya Smith	5:50
8.	"Prince of Peace" (from a Golan Heights Memorial of War and by the shining lights of the old city)	Thomas, Houston, Crocker	Taya Smith	8:12
9.	"Empires" (from the ruins of Katzrin)	Houston, Thomas, Chris Davenport, Ben Tennikoff	Joel Houston	7:17
10.	"Rule" (from a stage by the Dead Sea)	Crocker, Houston, Tennikoff	Matt Crocker	3:57
11.	"Captain" (adrift on the Sea of Galilee)	Benjamin Hastings, Seth Simmons	Jad Gillies	6:24
12.	"Closer Than You Know" (from a quiet place beneath an olive tree)	Houston, Crocker, Chislett	Joel Houston, Taya Smith	10:03
Total length:				77:37

Bonus tracks
No.	Title	Writer(s)	Worship leader	Length
13.	"I Surrender" (by the ancient walls of a ruined temple)	Crocker	Matt Crocker	6:10
14.	"Oceans (Where Feet May Fail)" (from the sea on which He walked)	Crocker, Houston, Salomon Ligthelm	Taya Smith	8:06
15.	"Scandal of Grace (I'd Be Lost)" (by an empty tomb not far from Golgotha)	Crocker, Houston, Tennikoff	Matt Crocker, Taya Smith	7:18
Total length:				99:11

== Charts ==
In Australia, Of Dirt and Grace: Live from the Land debuted at number twelve on the ARIA Albums Chart, marking it as the twenty-ninth Top 50 chart entry for a Hillsong album. The following week, the album reached a new peak at number eight, thus becoming the twenty-first top 10 entry for a Hillsong album.

Chart (2016)	Peak position
Australian Albums (ARIA)	8
Dutch Albums (Album Top 100)	80
French Albums (SNEP)	61
New Zealand Heatseekers Albums (RMNZ)	2
UK Christian & Gospel Albums (OCC)	1
US Billboard 200	40
US Christian Albums (Billboard)	2

== Release history ==
Region	Date	Format	Label
Worldwide	15 July 2016	Digital download, CD	Hillsong Music, Sparrow Records, Capitol CMG
Worldwide	29 July 2016	CD/DVD	Hillsong Music, Sparrow Records, Capitol CMG
