= Forever Reign (Hillsong Church album) =

Live album by Hillsong Church
- Released: 22 October 2012
- Recorded: March 2012
- Venue: St. Stephen's Anglican Church, Sydney, Australia
- Genre: Contemporary worship
- Label: Hillsong, EMI

Hillsong Music Australia Hillsong Chapel Series chronology
Yahweh (2010)	Forever Reign (2012)

Forever Reign is the second installment in the Hillsong Chapel praise and worship series by Hillsong Church, which was released in Australia on 22 October 2012 by Hillsong Music Australia. It is an acoustic and devotional collection of Hillsong songs by the Hillsong team. Recorded live in March 2012 at St. Stephen's Anglican Church, "Forever Reign" is the second installment in this organic contemplative expression of praise and worship. The album reached the Top 50 on the ARIA Albums Chart.

== History and recording ==
The Hillsong Chapel album contains intimate and devotional collection of Hillsong songs by the Hillsong Worship and Hillsong United. The songs are congregational songs, carefully rearranged to be more intimate and suitable for small gatherings. The objective of the Hillsong Chapel project is to help resource smaller congregations with the favourites from Hillsong Live and Hillsong United.

== Track listing ==
Standard CD
No.	Title	Writer(s)	Original album appearance	Length
1.	"God is Able"	Ben Fielding, Reuben Morgan	God is Able	3:50
2.	"Hallelujah"	Rolf Wam Fjell, Marty Sampson, Matthew Tennikoff	United We Stand	2:10
3.	"Rhythms of Grace"	Chris Davenport, Dean Ussher	Aftermath	5:45
4.	"You"	Joel Houston	A Beautiful Exchange	4:08
5.	"Cornerstone"	Eric Liljero, Morgan, Edward Mote, Jonas Myrin	Cornerstone	4:28
6.	"It Is Well with My Soul"	Philip Bliss, Fielding, Morgan, Horatio Spafford		4:48
7.	"Forever Reign"	Jason Ingram, Morgan	A Beautiful Exchange	4:32
8.	"Desert Song"	Brooke Ligertwood	This Is Our God	4:03
9.	"His Glory Appears"	Darlene Zschech, Sampson	Faith + Hope + Love	4:50
10.	"The Lost Are Found"	Fielding, Sam Knock	God is Able	4:21
11.	"Beautiful Exchange"	Houston	A Beautiful Exchange	4:54
12.	"With Everything"	Houston	This Is Our God	8:06
Total length:				55:50

DVD
No.	Title	Length
1.	"God is Able"	3:59
2.	"You"	4:08
3.	"Cornerstone"	4:20
4.	"Forever Reign"	4:35
5.	"His Glory Appears"	4:50
6.	"The Lost Are Found"	4:21
7.	"With Everything"	8:07
