= 2013 in Australian music =

The following is a list of notable events that have happened in 2013 in music in Australia.

== Events ==
=== January ===
- The 2013 Big Day Out music festival was held in Sydney, Melbourne, Perth, Adelaide and the Gold Coast, headlined by Red Hot Chili Peppers and the Killers.

=== February ===
- Laneway was a sold out music festival in Sydney in early February.

=== March ===
- The 2013 Future Music Festival took place in March in various locations around Australia. There were 39 Australian and international artists who performed.

=== July ===
- The Splendour in the Grass is an annual music festival that began in late July and ended in early August. The 2013 edition of the festival was held at Belongil Fields, and featured rock, hip hop, alternative, and electronic music, headlined by Mumford & Sons, The National and Lorde (the latter replacing cancelled headliner Frank Ocean).

=== September ===
- Defqon.1 Festival took place on September 14 in Sydney.

=== October ===
- On 28 October 2013, season five of The X Factor Australia ended. It was announced that Dami Im was the winner. The runner-up was Taylor Henderson.

=== December ===
- ARIA Music Awards of 2013 was a series award ceremonies that honored musical artists and groups.

== Bands disbanded ==
- Hungry Kids of Hungary

== Albums and singles ==
=== February ===
- Push the Sky Away was released on 18 February 2013. The album was released by the alternative rock band Nick Cave and the Bad Seeds. The album peaked number 1 on many charts including Australian ARIA Albums Chart, Austrian Ö3 Albums Chart, and Belgian Albums Chart (Flanders)
- Hillsong United released their third studio album Zion on 22 February.

=== March ===
- The Drones' studio album I See Seaweed was released.

=== June ===
- Empire of the Sun's second album Ice on the Dune was released on 14 June 2013 in Australia.

=== July ===
- Hillsong Church's live album Glorious Ruins was released on 2 July.
- Violent Soho's single In The Aisle was released on 8 July 2013. This was the first single of the album Hungry Ghost.

=== September ===
- Hillsong United released their EP Oceans on 10 September 2013.

=== October ===
- We Are Young & Free was released on 1 October 2013. The album contained the singles Alive, Wake, and "Vivo Estás".
- The album, Zion Acoustic Sessions, was released by Hillsong United on 29 October.
- Dami Im's single Alive was released on 28 October 2013. The single ranked number 1 on the ARIA charts upon its release.

== 2013 Australian music charts ==
=== Triple J Hottest 100 ===
Year	Top ten
All time (2013)	1. Vance Joy – "Riptide"; 2. Lorde – "Royals"; 3. Daft Punk featuring Pharrell – "Get Lucky"; 4. Arctic Monkeys – "Do I Wanna Know?"; 5. Flume & Chet Faker – "Drop the Game"; 6. Arctic Monkeys – "Why'd You Only Call Me When You're High?"; 7. Lana Del Rey – "Young and Beautiful"; 8. Matt Corby – "Resolution"; 9. The Preatures – "Is This How You Feel?"; 10. London Grammar – "Strong"

=== 2013 AIR charts ===
Winners below for the 2013 Carlton Dry Independent music awards:

- Best Independent Artist – Flume
- Best Independent Album – Flume – Flume
- Breakthrough Independent Artist – Vance Joy
- Best Independent Single/EP – Vance Joy – God Loves You When You're Dancing
- Best Independent Hip Hop Album – Seth Sentry – This Was Tomorrow
- Best Independent Country Album – Catherine Britt – Always Never Enough
- Best Independent Blues And Roots Album – Paul Kelly – Spring and Fall
- Best Independent Hard Rock, Heavy or Punk Album – King Gizzard & the Lizard Wizard – 12 Bar Bruise
- Best Independent Jazz Album – Jonathan Zwartz – The Remembering and Forgetting of the Air
- Best Independent Dance/Electronica Album – Flume – Flume
- Best Independent Dance/Electronica or Club Single – Flume – "Holdin On"
- Best Independent Classical Album – Amy Dickson – Catch Me If You Can
- Best Independent Label – Future Classic
- Carlton Dry Global Music Grant winner – King Gizzard & the Lizard Wizard

== Deaths ==
- 11 February – Kevin Peek, Australian guitarist (Sky) (b. 1946)
- 15 May – Albert Lance, Australian-French tenor and actor (b. 1925)
- 21 June – Wendy Saddington, Australian singer (Chain) (b. 1949)
- 1 July – Gary Shearston, Australian singer-songwriter (b. 1939)
- 31 July – Helen Quach, Vietnamese-born orchestral conductor (b. 1940)

== See also ==
- List of number-one singles of 2013 (Australia)
- List of number-one albums of 2013 (Australia)
- 2013 in music
- 2013 in Australia
- List of Australian music festivals
