= Oceans (EP) =

EP by Hillsong United
- Released: 10 September 2013
- Recorded: 2013
- Genre: Contemporary worship music
- Length: 43:47
- Label: Hillsong Australia Centroamerica
- Producer: Michael Guy Chislett

Hillsong United chronology
In a Valley by the Sea (2007)	Oceans (2013)	Empires (2015)

Oceans is the third EP by Australian worship band Hillsong United. The EP released on 10 September 2013, and features four versions of the song, "Oceans (Where Feet May Fail)", including the album version, as found on Zion. (February 2013) The song peaked at number one on the Billboard Christian Songs chart at the end of 2013. Billboard referred to the band's name as "United" on the chart.

== Background ==
The song was one of the first ones the band wrote for Zion. Breathecast described the other versions of the song as follows: "The latter [second] version strips away a little of the cinematic strings effect as well as the extended bridge of the original. Rather, imbued with a acerbic drumming pattern and heftier production, it certainly has the package Christian radio is looking for. The Lark Remix which is third on the EP accelerates the tempo morphing this ballad into a club-like anthem with pacey dance beats, yet without destroying the reverential mode of the song." He said of the fourth live version: "It is the most worshipful version".

== Reception ==
Professional ratings
Review scores
Source	Rating
Indie Vision Music	3/5 stars
Louder than the Music	4/5 stars

Jonathan Andre of Indie Vision Music called "Oceans" "a classic worship song" but advised "the casual listener" to stream the songs first before buying the EP and said "if I were to pick between this EP and another EP full of 5 brand new worship songs, I’d pick the other EP." Louder than the Music reviewer Jono Davies also questioned the need of releasing several versions of "Oceans" while he noted that the song is "powerful". Timothy Yap of Breathecast applauded the lyrics: "Such a progression of faith within the unfolding of the song moving from fear to faith to triumphantly walking upon our 'oceans' is what makes this song such a stellar example of the craft of song writing."

== Track listing ==
Oceans EP
No.	Title	Length
1.	"Oceans (Where Feet May Fail)" (Album version)	8:56
2.	"Oceans (Where Feet May Fail)" (Radio version)	4:09
3.	"Oceans (Where Feet May Fail)" (Lark remix version)	5:15
4.	"Oceans (Where Feet May Fail)" (Live at Red Rocks)	9:49

Notes

- Matt Crocker, Joel Houston and Salomon Ligthelm wrote the song, and Taya Smith is the worship leader.
