= Michael Guy Chislett =

Australian musician

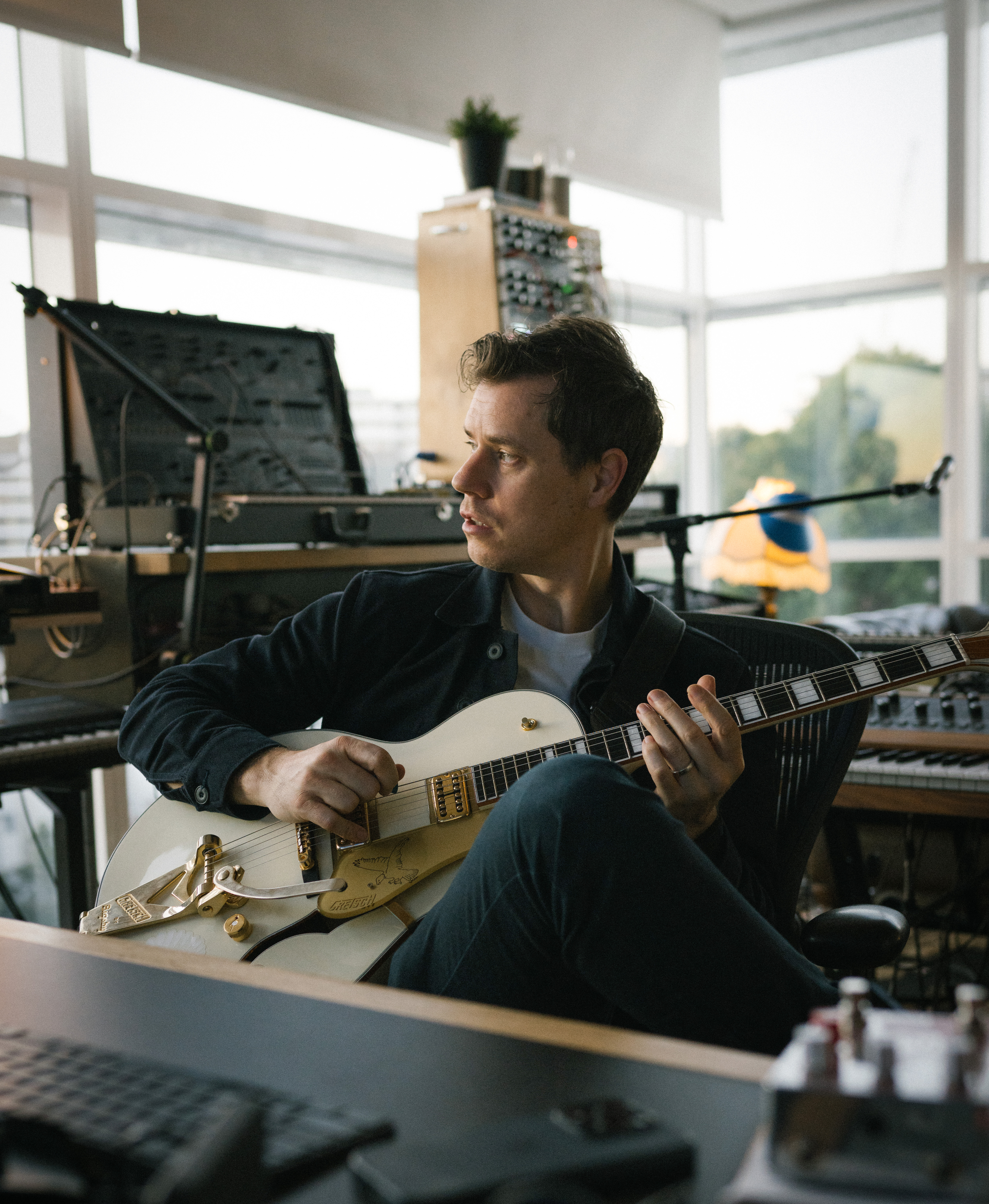
- Chislett in 2024

Background information
- Born: 6 April 1982 (age 44); Skipton, Victoria, Australia
- Genres: Contemporary Christian, rock, alternative rock, indie rock
- Occupations: Musician; record producer
- Instruments: Guitar; keyboards
- Years active: 1996–present
- Member of: Hillsong United
- Formerly of: Brooke Fraser, The Academy Is…, Limousine, Platinum Weird, Pistol Youth, 1969, Butch Walker, Paperadio, Able
- Website: hillsong.com/united/

Michael Guy Chislett (born 6 April 1982) is an Australian musician and record producer. He is the lead guitarist and founding member of the Christian worship band Hillsong United and was the lead guitarist of the rock band the Academy Is...

== Career ==
=== Hillsong United ===
Chislett has played guitar on all Hillsong United albums excluding Look to You (2005) and Aftermath: Live in Miami (2012). These albums include 2019's People and 2015's Empires, for which he was also the album's producer.

In the United States, People sold 107,000 equivalent album units in its opening week, debuting at No. 2 on the mainstream Billboard 200 chart (dated 2 May). Being their third top ten appearance on Billboard 200, the album is the highest ranking appearance for Hillsong United on the chart, beating out the No. 5 debuts by 2015's Empires and 2013's Zion, while breaking their best sales week record, formerly held by Empires. People registered at No. 1 on Billboard's Christian albums chart, and won the Dove Award for 2019 Worship Album of year.

In 2013, Chislett came back to Hillsong United full-time to produce the 2013 album Zion. He then became current full-time touring member and producer for Hillsong United.

=== The Academy Is... (2007–2011) ===
Chislett was the lead guitarist of Chicago rock band the Academy Is..., replacing Tom Conrad in late 2006. He played and co-wrote music for the albums Santi and Fast Times at Barrington High.

=== Butch Walker ===
Prior to joining the Academy Is..., Chislett played in Butch Walker's band. He toured with Walker in 2005 and 2006. He appeared on the studio album The Rise and Fall of Butch Walker and the Let's-Go-Out-Tonites and the live DVD Live at Budokan.

=== Other projects ===
Chislett wrote music and played guitar in the band 1969, whose line-up is completed by Butch Walker and drummer Darren Dodd (The Let's-Go-Out-Tonites, Electric South). The band's debut album, Maya, was released on 1 April 2008.

Chislett also played guitar in Pistol Youth with Brad Carter from Steriogram. Pistol Youth's Smiling can backfire EP was released digitally in early 2008.

Chislett played guitar for Brooke Fraser's Flags tour and is featured on her music video "Coachella".

Chislett has his own production company, Skipton Productions, Inc., which was established in Nashville, Tennessee, in 2008.

== Personal life ==
Chislett was born on 6 April 1982 in Skipton, Victoria, a small country town in Australia. Most of his family later moved to Sydney, where he attended Cherrybrook Technology High School. He dropped out in Year 10 to spend more time on music. In 2003, he moved to London with Newcastle band Paperadio. A few months later he moved to Los Angeles.

He is married to Naomi and they have two children, Elliott (born 2014) and Ruby (born 2016).

== Music gear ==
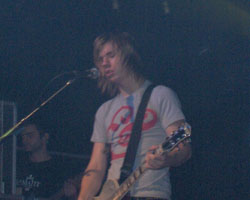
Chislett performing in 2005

- Gretsch guitars (Gretsch White Falcon, Black Penguin, Silverjet)
- Fender guitars (Jazzmaster, Stratocaster, Jaguar, Telecaster)
- Divided by 13 RSA-31 amp
- Milkman Sound 85w pedal steel amp
- Z.Vex Effects, Cusack Music, JHS Pedals

== Discography ==
=== As a producer ===
- Hillsong United – All of the Above (2007)
- Hillsong United – Across the Earth: Tear Down The Walls (2009)
- Pistol Youth – My Own Private Amsterdam (2010)
- Hillsong United – Aftermath (2011)
- Hillsong United – Zion (2013)
- Hillsong Young & Free – We Are Young & Free (2013)
- Hillsong United – The White Album: Remix Project (2014)
- Hillsong Worship – No Other Name (2014)
- NO – El Prado (2014)
- Hillsong Worship – Open Heaven / River Wild (2015)
- Hillsong United – Hillsong: Let Hope Rise (2015)
- Hillsong United – Empires (2015)
- Hillsong Young & Free – Youth Revival (2016)
- Hillsong United – Of Dirt and Grace: Live from the Land (2016)
- Hillsong Worship – Let There Be Light (2016)
- Hillsong Young & Free – Youth Revival: Acoustic (2017)
- Hillsong United – "Rule" on Worthy of Your Name: Live at Passion 2017 (2017)
- Hillsong United – Wonder (2017)
- Hillsong United – "Heaven Knows" on The Shack: Music From and Inspired By the Original Motion Picture (2017)
- Hillsong Worship – The Peace Project (2017)
- Hillsong Worship – There Is More (2018)
- Hillsong Young & Free – III (2018)
- Hillsong Young & Free – III Live (2018)
- Crowder – I Know a Ghost associate vocal producer (2018)
- Hillsong United – People (2019)
- Hillsong Worship – Awake (2019)
- Hillsong United – "Good Grace" on Roar: Live from Passion 2020 (2020)
- Hillsong Young & Free – Out Here On a Friday Where It Began (2021)

=== As a guitarist ===
- Hillsong United – Best Friend (2000)
- Hillsong Worship – Blessed (2002)
- Hillsong Worship – Hope (2003)
- Hillsong United – More Than Life (2004)
- Hillsong Worship – God He Reigns (2005)
- Hillsong Worship – Unified Praise (2005)
- Butch Walker – Live at Budokan (2005)
- Hillsong United – United We Stand (2006)
- Butch Walker – The Rise and Fall of Butch Walker and the Let's-Go-Out-Tonites (2006)
- The Academy Is... – Santi (2007)
- Tim Hughes – Holding Nothing Back (2007)
- Hillsong United – All of the Above (2007)
- Pete Yorn – "Alive" – Nightcrawler (2007)
- Pistol Youth – Smiling Can Backfire (2007)
- Hillsong United – The I Heart Revolution: With Hearts as One (2008)
- Ryan Cabrera – The Moon Under Water (2008)
- 1969 – MAYA (2008)
- Good Charlotte – Greatest Remixes (2008)
- The Academy Is… – Fast Times at Barrington High (2008)
- Hillsong United – Across the Earth: Tear Down The Walls] (2009)
- Pistol Youth – Every Eight Weeks (2009)
- Ben Cantelon – Running After You (2010)
- Pistol Youth – My Own Private Amsterdam (2010)
- Tim Hughes – Love Shine Through (2011)
- Hillsong United – Aftermath (2011)
- Hillsong United – Zion (2013)
- Hillsong United – Zion Acoustic Sessions (2013)
- Hillsong Worship – No Other Name (2014)
- Hillsong Worship – Open Heaven / River Wild (2015)
- Hillsong United – Empires (2015)
- Hillsong United – Of Dirt and Grace: Live from the Land (2016)
- Hillsong Worship – Let There Be Light (2016)
- Hillsong United – "Rule" – Worthy of Your Name: Live at Passion 2017 (2017)
- Hillsong United – Wonder (2017)
- Hillsong United – "Heaven Knows" on The Shack: Music From and Inspired By the Original Motion Picture (2017)'
- Hillsong Worship – The Peace Project (2017)
- Hillsong Worship – There Is More (2018)
- Hillsong Young & Free – III (2018)
- Hillsong United – People (2019)
- Hillsong Worship – Awake (2019)
- Hillsong United – "Good Grace" on Roar: Live from Passion 2020 (2020)
- Hillsong Young & Free – Out Here On a Friday Where It Began (2021)

=== Videography ===
- Hillsong United – More Than Life bonus DVD with album (2004)
- Butch Walker – Live at Budokan music DVD (2005)
- Hillsong United – United We Stand bonus DVD with album (2006)
- Hillsong United – All of the Above bonus DVD with album (2007)
- Hillsong United – The I Heart Revolution: With Hearts as One music DVD (2008)
- Hillsong United – Zion Acoustic Sessions music DVD (2013)
- Hillsong: Let Hope Rise feature film (2015)
- Hillsong United – Of Dirt and Grace: Live from the Land music DVD (2016)
