= Hillsong: Let Hope Rise =

- Theatrical release poster
- Directed by: Michael John Warren
- Produced by: Jonathon Bock; Ben Field; Matthew Weaver
- Starring: Joel Houston; Michael Guy Chislett; Matt Crocker; Jonathon Douglass; Jad Gillies; Simon Kobler; Jihea Oh; Taya Smith; Benjamin Tennikoff; Dylan Thomas
- Cinematography: Cameron Glendenning
- Edited by: Edward A. Bishop
- Music by: Hillsong United
- Production companies: Cantinas Entertainment; Grace Hill Media; MediaWeaver Entertainment
- Distributed by: Pure Flix Entertainment
- Release date: 16 September 2016
- Running time: 103 minutes
- Country: United States
- Language: English
- Budget: $10 million
- Box office: $2.6 million

Hillsong: Let Hope Rise is a 2016 American Christian documentary film on Hillsong United directed by Michael John Warren. The film was released on 16 September 2016, by Pure Flix Entertainment after several delays.

== Synopsis ==
The film chronicles the unlikely rise to prominence of the Australia-based Christian band Hillsong United. Their music is so popular it is estimated that on any given Sunday, more than 50 million churchgoers around the world are singing their songs. The film follows an event that took place on 23 October 2014 at the Forum arena in Los Angeles with 17,000 people attending, and moments preceding the concert with the creation of new songs featured on Empires (2015).

== Soundtrack ==
Hillsong: Let Hope Rise - Original Motion Picture Soundtrack was released as the film's soundtrack on 12 August 2016 under Hillsong Music, Sparrow Records and Capitol Christian Music Group. The soundtrack features songs from Hillsong United, as well as Hillsong's Worship and Young & Free divisions.

=== Track listing ===
Standard edition
No.	Title	Writer(s)	Worship leader	Length
1.	"With Everything" (Hillsong United, Live at The Forum)	Joel Houston	Joel Houston	9:35
2.	"Touch the Sky" (Hillsong United, Live at The Forum)	Michael Guy Chislett, Houston, Dylan Thomas	Taya Smith	4:48
3.	"Mighty to Save" (Hillsong United, Live in Miami)	Ben Fielding, Reuben Morgan	Joel Houston	5:22
4.	"Oceans (Where Feet May Fail)" (Hillsong United, Live at The Forum)	Matt Crocker, Houston, Salomon Ligthelm	Taya Smith	8:56
5.	"This I Believe (The Creed)" (Hillsong Worship, No Other Name)	Crocker, Fielding	Matt Crocker	6:42
6.	"Broken Vessels (Amazing Grace)" (Hillsong Worship, No Other Name)	Houston, Jonas Myrin	Taya Smith	7:12
7.	"Aftermath" (Hillsong United, Live at The Forum)	Houston	Joel Houston	8:32
8.	"Break Free" (Hillsong United, Live in Miami)	Crocker, Houston, Scott Ligertwood	Jonathon Douglass	4:06
9.	"Relentless" (Hillsong United, Live at The Forum)	Crocker, Houston	Jonathon Douglass, Taya Smith	4:27
10.	"Hosanna" (Hillsong United, Live at The Forum)	Brooke Ligertwood	Taya Smith	6:32
11.	"The Stand" (Hillsong United, Live at The Forum)	Houston	Joel Houston, Jad Gillies	7:08
12.	"Forever Reign" (Hillsong Worship, A Beautiful Exchange)	Jason Ingram, Morgan	Jad Gillies	6:16
13.	"Back to Life" (Hillsong Young & Free, We Are Young & Free)	Joel Davies, Aodhan King	Melodie Wagner	4:21
14.	"Arise" (Hillsong United, Zion)	Steven Robertson, Ryan Taubert	Joel Houston	3:15
Total length:				87:12

=== Charts ===
Chart (2016)	Peak position
Australian Albums (ARIA)	94

== Release ==
Directed by Michael John Warren, the film was originally supposed be released by Warner Bros. during the 2015 Easter weekend. In March 2015, Relativity Media obtained the distribution rights and the film shifted to a 29 May release. In April, Relativity moved the film to 30 September 2015. However, after Relativity Media filed for Chapter 11 bankruptcy, the film was moved to an unknown release date. The film was later picked up by Pure Flix Entertainment and the film was released on 16 September 2016.

== Reception ==
=== Box office ===
The film made $1.4 million from 816 theaters in its opening weekend, which was considered low, with Deadline Hollywood saying "we've seen [documentaries] make this much money on half the number of screens".

=== Critical response ===
On Rotten Tomatoes, the film holds an approval rating of 67%, based on 9 reviews, with an average rating of 6.04/10. On Metacritic, the film received a weighted average score of 43 out of 100, based on six critics, indicating "mixed or average" reviews. Audiences polled by CinemaScore gave the film an average grade of "A" on an A+ to F scale, while those at PostTrak gave it an overall positive score of 90%.

Nick Olszyk of Catholic World Report gave it his highest rating of five reels, saying it "renewed [my] courage to face my trails." He also said their performance of Oceans was "as good as anything by Bach, Handel, or the great anonymous monastics of the Middle Ages."
