= Hillsong United: Live in Miami =

Live in Miami

Live album by Hillsong United
- Released: 14 February 2012
- Recorded: 6 August 2011
- Venue: American Airlines Arena
- Genre: Contemporary Christian, Christian rock
- Length: 127:09
- Label: Hillsong, Sparrow, Capitol CMG
- Producer: Joel Houston

Hillsong United chronology
Aftermath (2011)	Live in Miami (2012)	Zion (2013)

Live in Miami is the eleventh live album/DVD by contemporary Christian worship band Hillsong United, released on 14 February 2012 through their own label. The album was recorded at the American Airlines Arena on 6 August 2011 as part of their tour promoting their second studio album, Aftermath (2011).

Their first live album since Across the Earth (2009), Live in Miami contains eight songs from Aftermath, two songs from first studio album All of the Above, and several songs from previous live albums. Unlike previous live recordings, the album does not contain new songs. The album peaked in the Top 50 on the ARIA Albums Chart.

== Background ==
Having led worship in churches, stadiums and open fields around the world, United's Live in Miami is the first live album from the band since 2009 and features 22 tracks, all captured during the band's sold-out worship night in Miami. In 2011, best-selling modern worship band Hillsong United brought a new and fresh approach to tours, visuals, songs and multimedia to the U.S. for the widely successful "Aftermath Tour". The tour logged sold out worship nights in venues across the country - from New York to Los Angeles (where the band became the first Christian band to sell out Staples Center) and back east to Miami where the CD and DVD were recorded.

== Track listing ==
Disc 1
No.	Title	Writer(s)	Lead Vocals	Length
1.	"Go"	Matt Crocker	Matt Crocker; Jonathon Douglass	04:09
2.	"Break Free"	Joel Houston, Matt Crocker, Scott Ligertwood	Jonathon Douglass	04:08
3.	"You"	Joel Houston	Joel Houston	04:50
4.	"Search My Heart"	Joel Houston, Matt Crocker	Jad Gillies	07:04
5.	"Mighty to Save"	Reuben Morgan, Ben Fielding	Joel Houston	05:13
6.	"Hosanna"	Brooke Fraser	Hayley Law	06:21
7.	"All I Need Is You"	Marty Sampson	Jad Gillies	05:57
8.	"Bones"	Joel Houston, Jill McCloghry	Jill McCloghry	04:08
9.	"Nova"	Joel Houston, Matt Crocker, Michael Guy Chislett	Matt Crocker	06:03
10.	"Aftermath"	Joel Houston	Joel Houston	08:07

Disc 2
No.	Title	Writer(s)	Lead Vocals	Length
1.	"Freedom Is Here" / "Shout Unto God"	Reuben Morgan, Scott Ligertwood / Joel Houston, Marty Sampson	Jad Gillies / Joel Houston	07:42
2.	"Like An Avalanche"	Joel Houston, Dylan Thomas	Hayley Law	06:23
3.	"Rhythms Of Grace"	Chris Davenport, Dean Ussher	Jad Gillies	06:23
4.	"Oh You Bring"	Matt Crocker	Matt Crocker	06:25
5.	"The Stand"	Joel Houston	Joel Houston	04:55
6.	"From The Inside Out"	Joel Houston	Joel Houston	05:19
7.	"A Song To Sing..."	Joel Houston	Joel Houston	02:49
8.	"With Everything"	Joel Houston	Joel Houston	10:54
9.	"Your Name High"	Joel Houston	Jonathon Douglass	04:14
10.	"Take It All"	Marty Sampson, Matt Crocker, Scott Ligertwood	Jonathon Douglass	04:12
11.	"Yours Forever"	Joel Davies, Braden Lang	Jonathon Douglass	04:09
12.	"Take Heart"	Joel Houston	Joel Houston	08:08

== Track listing (DVD/Blu-Ray) ==
1. "Go"
2. "Break Free"
3. "You"
4. "Search My Heart"
5. "Mighty To Save"
6. "Hosanna"
7. "All I Need Is You"
8. "Bones"
9. "Nova"
10. "Aftermath"
11. "Freedom Is Here/Shout Unto God"
12. "Like An Avalanche"
13. "Rhythms of Grace"
14. "Oh You Bring"
15. "The Stand"
16. "From The Inside Out"
17. "A Song To Sing..."
18. "With Everything"
19. "Your Name High"
20. "Take It All"
21. "Yours Forever"
22. "Take Heart"

=== Bonus Features ===
1. "In The Aftermath"

=== Other songs played ===
The song "Rise" found in the God Is Able album was played during the concert. Nevertheless, it was not included in the album.

== Personnel ==
Vocalists
Joel Houston, Matt Crocker, Jad Gillies, Jonathon Douglass, Hayley Law, Jill McCloghry, Dylan Thomas
Electric guitars
Timon Klein, Dylan Thomas, Jad Gillies, Joel Houston
Acoustic guitars
Jad Gillies, Joel Houston, Dylan Thomas
Bass
Adam Crosariol
Drums
Simon Kobler
Keys
Peter James
Additional drums and percussion
Matt Crocker, Jonathon Douglass (Tambourine), Joel Houston (on "Go"), Dylan Thomas (on "From the Inside Out")
Synthesizers
Jonathon Douglass, Joel Houston, Jill McCloghry, Dylan Thomas.
iPad synthesizer
Matt Crocker (on "Bones" and the DVD's introduction video)

== Charts ==
Singles chart

Year	Song	Peak chart position
Year	Song	US Christian Songs (Billboard)
2012	"Like An Avalanche"	41

Chart procession and succession
