= So Will I =

So Will I may refer to:

- "So Will I", a song by Ben Platt from his 2019 album Sing to Me Instead Deluxe Edition
- "So Will I (100 Billion X), a song from Hillsong United 2017 album Wonder
