= Wonder (Hillsong United album) =

Studio album by Hillsong United
- Released: 9 June 2017
- Recorded: 2016–2017
- Studio: Record Plant, Hollywood, United States; Mandala House, Bali, Indonesia; Baxter House Studios, Sydney, Australia; The Base Recording Studios, South Melbourne, Australia; Golddust Studios, Sydney, Australia
- Genre: Contemporary worship music; Contemporary Christian music
- Length: 71:00
- Label: Hillsong; Sparrow; Capitol CMG
- Producer: Joel Houston; Michael Guy Chislett

Hillsong United studio album chronology
Empires (2015)	Wonder (2017)	Are We There Yet? (2022)

Hillsong United chronology
Hillsong: Let Hope Rise (Original Motion Picture Soundtrack) (2016)	Wonder (2017)	People (2019)

Singles from Wonder
- 1. "Wonder" Released: 18 May 2017; 2. "So Will I (100 Billion X)" Released: 5 January 2018; 3. "Not Today" Released: 28 September 2018

Professional ratings
Review scores
Source	Rating
365 Days of Inspiring Media	4.5/5
CBN	3/5 stars
CCM Magazine	5/5 stars
Cross Rhythms	10/10 squares
Hallels	4.5/5
Louder Than the Music	4.5/5 stars
Jesus Freak Hideout	3.5/5 stars
The Christian Beat	4.8/5
Today's Christian Entertainment	3.8/5 stars

Wonder is the fifth studio album from Australian contemporary worship music band Hillsong United, a worship band from Hillsong Church. The album was released on 9 June 2017, under Hillsong Music, Sparrow Records and Capitol Christian Music Group. "Wonder" was released as the lead single for the album in May 2017, while "So Will I (100 Billion X)" and "Not Today" were released in 2018.

== Background ==
The band had several recording sessions for Wonder at The Record Plant in Los Angeles. Lead vocalist Joel Houston felt that the album's title and themes reflected returning wonder to both faith and worship, saying, "This is the challenge, and this is what worship— if worship can be summed up as an expression of art and music and story— is ultimately designed to do. To elevate the conversation, re-awaken the soul to something other, and lift our eyes to the wonder of a superlative truth." "Splinters and Stones" was described as having "striking vocal modification and pulsing bass samplings" while containing personal lyrics.

== Promotion ==
Wonder was announced as a surprise album in May 2017, alongside its cover art, release date and track listing. Hillsong United also toured Israel to promote Empires, where they debuted "Wonder" alongside several new songs. "Wonder" and "Splinters and Stones" were released as instant-grat singles for those who pre-ordered the album, and the two songs were also available for streaming. "Wonder" was released to radio airplay as the album's first single on the same day. The official lyric video for "Wonder" was released on 18 May, while the lyric video for "Splinters and Stones" was uploaded two days later. Hillsong United also performed an acoustic version of "Wonder" for music website Worship Together. "Shadow Step" was released as the album's third promotional single on 26 May 2017, with its lyric video released on the same day. "Shape of Your Heart" was released as the album's fourth promotional single on 2 June.

"Wonder" was debuted live during the band's concert in Caeserea, Israel, which was filmed in a live video and released on 24 May 2017.

Hillsong United promoted the album during the 2017 Justice Conference on 9 June, and had "launch nights" for the album at the Beacon Theatre in New York City on 18 June 2017, and the Ryman Auditorium in Nashville, Tennessee on 23 June. The band was also announced as part of the line-up of the 2017 Outcry Festival at Toyota Stadium in Frisco, Texas.

On 5 January 2018, "So Will I (100 Billion X)" was released as the album's second single.

== Track listing ==
No.	Title	Writer(s)	Worship leader	Length
1.	"Wonder"	Joel Houston; Matt Crocker	Matt Crocker; Taya Smith	4:54
2.	"Shadow Step"	Houston; Michael Guy Chislett	Taya Smith	5:34
3.	"Future Marches In"	Houston; Crocker	Matt Crocker	5:42
4.	"So Will I (100 Billion X)"	Benjamin William Hastings; Houston; Michael Fatkin	Benjamin Hastings	6:51
5.	"Splinters and Stones"	Houston; Chislett	Joel Houston; Taya Smith	4:32
6.	"Glimmer in the Dust"	Aodhan King; Hastings; Dylan Thomas; Houston	Taya Smith; Jad Gillies; Joel Houston	7:44
7.	"Greatest of These"	Hastings; Houston; Fatkin	Joel Houston; Brooke Ligertwood	3:59
8.	"Shape of Your Heart"	Houston; Crocker	Matt Crocker	5:02
9.	"Not Today"	Houston; Crocker	Taya Smith	4:13
10.	"Life"	Houston; Crocker; Chislett	Michelle Cook; Jonathon Douglass	6:08
11.	"Rain / Reign"	Houston; Crocker	Jad Gillies; Courtney Tennikoff	6:34
12.	"Water to Wine"	Houston	Joel Houston	9:47
Total length:				71:00

== Accolades ==
In 2018, it was announced that "So Will I (100 Billion X)" song won a GMA Dove Award in the category of Worship Recorded Song of the Year. The song also nominated Song of the Year. Wonder album was nominated Pop/Contemporary Album of the Year, while Hillsong United band was nominated Artist of the Year.

== Charts ==
=== Weekly charts ===
Chart (2017)	Peak position
Australian Albums (ARIA)	4
Belgian Albums (Ultratop Flanders)	131
Canadian Albums (Billboard)	39
Dutch Albums (Album Top 100)	91
New Zealand Albums (RMNZ)	19
Norwegian Albums (VG-lista)	37
UK Christian & Gospel Albums (OCC)	1
US Billboard 200	21
US Top Christian Albums (Billboard)	1

=== Year-end charts ===
Chart (2017)	Position
Australian Albums (ARIA)	72
US Christian Albums (Billboard)	22
Chart (2018)	Position
US Christian Albums (Billboard)	8
Chart (2019)	Position
US Christian Albums (Billboard)	21
Chart (2020)	Position
US Christian Albums (Billboard)	33
Chart (2021)	Position
US Christian Albums (Billboard)	74
