= More Than Life =

Live album by Hillsong United
- Released: 23 March 2004
- Recorded: 2–3 October 2003
- Genre: Contemporary worship music
- Length: 75:00
- Label: Hillsong Music Australia
- Producer: Joel Houston

Hillsong United chronology
To the Ends of the Earth (2002)	More Than Life (2004)	Look to You (2005)

More Than Life is the fifth live praise and worship album by Hillsong United. The CD comes with a free DVD which includes documentary footage, interviews and 'behind the scenes'. The album appeared on the ARIA Albums Chart Top 100.

== Track listing ==
More Than Life track listing
No.	Title	Writer(s)	Worship leader	Length
1.	"One Way"	Joel Houston, Jonathon Douglass	Joel Houston, Marty Sampson	04:09
2.	"Light"	Marty Sampson	Marty Sampson	03:40
3.	"Evermore"	Houston	Joel Houston	04:33
4.	"Open Up The Heavens"	Houston	Joel Houston, Tulele Faletolu	04:09
5.	"Take All Of Me"	Sampson	Marty Sampson	07:23
6.	"Majesty"	Martin Smith, Stuart Garrard	Marty Sampson	01:27
7.	"Always"	Mia Fieldes	Michelle Fragar, Tulele Faletolu	06:40
8.	"Sing (Your Love)"	Reuben Morgan	Jad Gillies, Holly Dawson	07:45
9.	"Where The Love Lasts Forever"	Houston	Joel Houston	06:13
10.	"Consuming Fire"	Tim Hughes	Tim Hughes	07:59
11.	"More Than Life"	Morgan	Marty Sampson	06:53
12.	"Jesus' Blood"	Smith	Marty Sampson	02:38
13.	"Shine For You"	Sampson	Marty Sampson	03:51
14.	"Soldier"	Sampson, Tulele Faletolu	Tulele Faletolu	03:37
15.	"All Day"	Sampson	Marty Sampson	04:34
Total length:				75:02

=== Hidden features ===
There is an Easter egg on the DVD of a black-and-white video of Tim Hughes playing the song "Consuming Fire". To access press "Song Selection" on the main menu, move down to the song "More Than Life" then press the right arrow to highlight an X below the skateboarder. Then press select (or equivalent).

== Personnel ==
- Joel Houston – worship leader, acoustic guitar
- Marty Sampson – worship leader, acoustic guitar
- Tim Hughes – worship leader, acoustic guitar
- Holly Dawson – vocals
- Jonathon Douglass – vocals
- Tulele Faletolu – vocals
- Michelle Fragar – vocals
- Jad Gillies – vocals
- Kathryn DeAraujo – vocals
- Anneka Kelly – vocals
- Sam Knock – vocals
- Jess Manusama – vocals
- Katrina Peoples – vocals
- Kirsty Thornthwaite – vocals
- Michael Guy Chislett – electric guitar
- Marcus Beaumont – electric guitar
- Matt Tennikoff – bass
- Peter King – keyboards
- Peter James – keyboards
- Kevin Lee – keyboards
- Luke Munns – drums
