= King of Majesty =

Live album by Hillsong United
- Released: 15 October 2001
- Recorded: July 2001
- Genre: Contemporary Christian, pop rock
- Length: 54:27
- Label: Hillsong Music
- Producer: Darlene Zschech, Reuben Morgan

Hillsong United chronology
| Best Friend (2000) | King of Majesty (2001) | To the Ends of the Earth (2002) |

King of Majesty is the third live praise and worship album by Hillsong United.

== Reception ==
In March 2002 Trevor Kirk of Cross Rhythms rated the album as 5 out of 10 and opined that the group has "shown a tendency to formulaic ruts rather than radical grooves".

== Track listing ==
1. "King Of Majesty" (Marty Sampson) - 04:39
2. "Most High" (Reuben Morgan) - 06:14
3. "Everything To Me" (Marty Sampson) - 04:14
4. "Your Spirit" (Luke Munns) - 05:19
5. "I Adore" (Reuben Morgan) - 04:25
6. "Fall" (Rebecca Mesiti) - 06:16
7. "God Is Great" (Marty Sampson) - 04:13
8. "Lift" (Ben McFall) - 03:45
9. "Perfect King" (Damian Bassett) - 07:02
10. "Holy, Holy, Holy" (traditional) - 03:28
11. "Did You Feel The Mountains Tremble?" (Martin Smith) - 04:58
