= Zion Acoustic Sessions =

Live album by Hillsong United
- Released: 29 October 2013
- Recorded: 2013
- Genre: Contemporary Christian
- Label: Hillsong, Capitol, Sparrow.
- Producer: Joel Houston

Hillsong United chronology
Zion (2013)	Zion Acoustic Sessions (2013)	The White Album (2014)

Zion Acoustic Sessions is the twelfth live album from the contemporary Christian music band Hillsong United which features the 12 songs from its previous album presented in an acoustic version. The album is available exclusively on iTunes. In the United States, it appeared on the Billboard 200 chart as well as reaching No. 4 on its Top Christian Albums and No. 25 on Top Digital Albums charts.

== Track listing ==
No.	Title	Writer(s)	Worship leader	Length
1.	"Relentless"	Matt Crocker, Joel Houston	Jonathon Douglass, Taya Smith	04:27
2.	"Up in Arms"	Houston	Joel Houston	04:50
3.	"Scandal of Grace"	Crocker, Houston	Matt Crocker	04:25
4.	"Oceans (Where Feet May Fail)"	Crocker, Houston, Salomon Ligthelm	Taya Smith	09:50
5.	"Stay and Wait"	Houston	Joel Houston	05:11
6.	"Mercy Mercy"	Crocker, Houston	Matt Crocker	05:08
7.	"Love Is War"	Houston	Joel Houston, Jad Gillies	06:25
8.	"Nothing Like Your Love"	Sam Knock	Jad Gillies	08:57
9.	"Heartbeats"	Michael Guy Chislett, Crocker, Houston, Ben Tennikoff	Matt Crocker	04:31
10.	"A Million Suns"	Scott Ligertwood, Dean Ussher	Laura Toggs, Jad Gillies	07:10
11.	"Tapestry"	Chislett, Crocker, Houston, Ligertwood, Tennikoff	Jad Gillies, Taya Smith	06:52
12.	"King of Heaven"	Crocker, Ligthelm, Ryan Taubert	Matt Crocker	05:52
Total length:				73:27
