= Aftermath (Hillsong United album) =

Studio album by Hillsong United
- Released: 15 February 2011
- Recorded: 2010
- Studio: Studios 301 (Sydney)
- Genres: Contemporary Christian, Indie rock, Synth-pop, Alternative dance, pop rock
- Length: 68:55
- Labels: Hillsong, Sparrow
- Producers: Michael Guy Chislett, Joel Houston, James Rudder

Hillsong United studio album chronology
All of the Above (2007)	Aftermath (2011)	Zion (2013)

Hillsong United chronology
Tear Down the Walls (2009)	Aftermath (2011)	Live in Miami (2012)

Singles from Aftermath
- 1. "Search My Heart" Released: 21 January 2011

Aftermath (stylised as 'aftər,maθ), formerly known as This Means Love, is the second studio album by Australian Contemporary Christian band Hillsong United. Production for the album began in March 2010 at Studios 301 in Sydney, Australia. It was announced on 10 November 2010, that coinciding with the Aftermath album release in February, Hillsong United would tour the United States and Canada in February and March 2011.

Aftermath debuted at number one on the US Billboard Christian Albums chart and at number 17 on the US Billboard 200 chart. In the United States, it ranked as the 17th best-selling Christian Album of 2011. The first single of the band, "Search My Heart", was released from the album on 21 January 2011 and appeared on the Billboard Christian Songs chart.

== Background ==
In March 2010 it was revealed that Hillsong United was in the studio working on the first part of their latest album. United's Aftermath was originally stated to be a two part project, with a studio release in September 2010 and another in 2011, but would later be conjoined into one album. On 25 May 2010 it was confirmed that stage two of the album was done after three weeks in the studio. The album title was announced via Hillsong United frontman Joel Houston's Twitter account on 27 October 2010. During a broadcast of Hillsong Backstage at Hillsong Conference 2010, it was uncovered that the album would debut in February 2011. There was a photo shoot lasting 3 days in over 10 different locations for the album artwork and photo collection on their website. The album leaked on 15 January 2011, exactly one month before the album's planned release date, when it was unintentionally made available for purchase on the US iTunes Store.

Talking about how the album was created, Joel Houston said: "We took a whole year off really doing something. And we had a bit of a soul search and talked to each other and said, 'if we're gonna do this, as in United, and keep moving with it, what's it going to look like? And how prepared are we? ...Maybe to just ride on the coattails of what we've been doing for the last ten years or so or do we want to really take this thing forward?' And I think we collectively decided, 'you know what? Let's throw ourselves into it like it's the first time we've ever done anything'." The album marks Marty Sampson's return, who sings the title track "Aftermath".

Concerning the title, Houston said: "Normally 'aftermath' has a negative, even traumatic, connotation. At the same time, when I look at the Crucifixion as an event, it paints an extraordinarily negative and horrific picture. But the aftermath of the Cross is hope for all mankind. It's grace, freedom, peace, life and everything that is good about God. I absolutely love that picture."

== Track listing ==
Standard Edition
No.	Title	Writer(s)	Worship leader	Length
1.	"Take Heart"	Joel Houston	Joel Houston	7:38
2.	"Go"	Matt Crocker	Matt Crocker	3:38
3.	"Like An Avalanche"	Joel Houston, Dylan Thomas	Jill McCloghry	4:24
4.	"Rhythms Of Grace"	Chris Davenport, Dean Ussher	David Ware	5:45
5.	"Aftermath"	Joel Houston	Marty Sampson	5:01
6.	"B.E." (Interlude)			2:55
7.	"Bones"	Joel Houston Jill McCloghry	Jill McCloghry	6:17
8.	"Father"	Joel Houston	Joel Houston	6:52
9.	"Nova"	Joel Houston, Matt Crocker, Michael Guy Chislett	Matt Crocker	5:46
10.	"Light Will Shine"	Matt Crocker, Marty Sampson	Jonathon Douglass	3:37
11.	"Search My Heart"	Joel Houston, Matt Crocker	Matt Crocker	6:06
12.	"Awakening"	Reuben Morgan, Chris Tomlin	Jad Gillies	7:12
13.	"Search My Heart" (Radio Version)	Joel Houston, Matt Crocker	Jad Gillies	3:56
Total length:				66:15

iTunes Deluxe Edition
No.	Title	Length
1.	"Go" (Music Video)	3:44
Total length:		69:58

== Reception ==
=== Critical response ===
Professional ratings
Review scores
Source	Rating
Allmusic	4/5 stars
Christian Music Zine	3.5/5 stars
Christianity Today	3/5 stars
Jesus Freak Hideout	3/5 stars
Louder Than The Music	5/5 stars

Allmusic's Jared Johnson gave the album four out of five stars, saying: " Aftermath shows that Hillsong continue to set the bar high and blur the lines between studio albums and live worship. Lindsay Williams of Crosswalk.com described the album as "a compilation album with singers trading lead vocals from song to song" and pointed out the title track ("Aftermath"), "Like An Avalanche", "Father", and "Awakening" as highlights of the album. She added: "Hillsong combines the musical prowess heard in mainstream music—even borrowing soundscapes from British bands like Coldplay at times—and pairs this atmospheric aura with reverent lyrics. Yet, Hillsong goes beyond the congregational-friendliness common to modern worship anthems by adding their own artistic flair." John Brandon of Christianity Today pointed out "Take Heart", "Go" and "Search My Heart" as the highlights of the album and summarized it saying: "More textured than previous releases, the new Hillsong United is also more experimental." Writing for Jesus Freak Hideout, Ryan Barbee concluded: "this offering definitely shows glimpses of brilliance, pure worship and a broadening of the creative horizons. For churches it might not offer what previous releases did, but it might influence a little bit of change." Jono Davies of Louder Than The Music wrote: "Creativity spills out on this album. [...] Overall this is another stunning album from Hillsong United, but is it the best album they have ever made? I don't know, but it's up there. Today's Christian Music's Matt Conner called the album "a testament to a mature, talented ensemble coming together to forge their best work yet".

=== Accolades ===
Aftermath was nominated at the 43rd GMA Dove Awards for Praise & Worship Album of the Year.

== Personnel ==
Hillsong United

- Matt Crocker – vocals, acoustic guitar, percussion, keyboard, synthesizer
- Adam Crosariol – bass
- Jonathon Douglass – vocals, electric piano, percussion
- Jad Gillies – vocals, electric guitar, percussion
- Joel Houston – vocals, electric guitar, keyboard, synthesizer, bass
- Peter James – piano, keyboard, synthesizer
- Timon Klein – electric guitar
- Simon Kobler – drums, percussion
- Dylan Thomas – electric guitar
- Jill McCloghry – guitar, vocals
- Hayley Law - vocals

Additional musicians

- Michael Guy Chislett (past UNITED musician) – engineer, producer, guitar, keyboards, piano, percussion
- Ben Tennikoff – keyboards, piano, accordion, glockenspiel, percussion
- Matt Tennikoff – bass
- Joel Hingston – guitar
- Chris Bennett – violin
- Hanna Creeze – violin
- Lauren Hodges – violin
- David Rodgers – drums
- Jilcasey Row – vocals
- Ben Whincop – bass, engineer
- Brooke Fraser – background vocals
- Annie Garratt – background vocals
- Chantel Norman – background, vocals
- Marty Sampson – vocals on "Aftermath"
- David Ware – vocals on "Rhythms of Grace"

== Charts ==
Album charts

Chart (2011)	Peak position
Australian Albums (ARIA)	4
New Zealand Albums (RMNZ)	12
US Billboard 200	17
US Digital Albums (Billboard)	5
US Top Christian Albums (Billboard)	1
Canadian Albums (Billboard)	32

Year-end charts

Chart (2011)	Position
US Christian Albums (Billboard)	17

Singles chart

Year	Song	Peak chart position
Year	Song	US Christian Songs (Billboard)
2011	"Search My Heart"	20

Singles year-end chart

Year	Single	Position
Year	Single	US Christian Songs (Billboard)
2011	"Search My Heart"	50
