= Best Friend (Hillsong United album) =

Live album by Hillsong United
- Released: 10 November 2000
- Recorded: 8 July 2000
- Venue: Hillsong Church Sydney, Australia
- Genre: Contemporary worship music, pop rock, punk rock
- Label: Hillsong
- Producer: Darlene Zschech, Reuben Morgan

Hillsong United chronology
Everyday (1999)	Best Friend (2000)	King of Majesty (2001)

Best Friend is the second live praise and worship album by Hillsong United. The album was released on 10 November 2000.

== Track listing ==
1. "My Best Friend" (Joel Houston and Marty Sampson)
2. "Stronger Than" (Paul Ewing)
3. "Saving Grace" (Michelle Fragar)
4. "Forever" (Marty Sampson)
5. "God of All Creation" (Mark Stevens and Paul Iannuzzelli)
6. "I Live for You" (Raymond Badham)
7. "Jesus Generation" (Reuben Morgan)
8. "I Will Sing" (Rebeca Mesiti)
9. "Jesus, Lover of My Soul" (Steve McPherson, David Grul and John Ezzy)
10. "The Reason I Live" (Marty Sampson)
