= Everyday (Hillsong United album) =

Live album by Hillsong United
- Released: November 1999
- Recorded: July 1999
- Genre: Contemporary Christian, Christian rock
- Length: 49:50
- Label: Hillsong Music Australia
- Producer: Darlene Zschech, Reuben Morgan

Hillsong United chronology
Everyday (1999)	Best Friend (2000)

Alternative cover

Everyday is the first live praise and worship album by Hillsong United. Following the success of the EP One, the album was recorded at the 1999 Hillsong Conference and released later that year. In 2000 the album was certified gold by Australian Recording Industry Association for shipment of 35000 units.

== Reception ==
In April 2000 Tim Roberts of Cross Rhythms rated the album as 10 out of 10 and felt it provided "quality songs, first class musicianship and an exemplary live recording, but above all it draws you into the presence of God".

== Track listing ==
1. "Everyday" (Joel Houston) - 03:43
2. "Jesus I Long" (Marty Sampson) - 02:45
3. "On The Lord's Day" (Reuben Morgan) - 05:40
4. "More" (Morgan) - 04:43
5. "Heaven" (Morgan) - 04:45
6. "Seeking You" (Sampson) - 04:35
7. "You Take Me Higher" (Raymond Badham) - 04:05
8. "Hear Our Prayer" (Tanya Riches) - 06:10
9. "Prayer To The King" (Sampson) - 06:14
10. "God Is Moving" (Sampson) - 07:15
