= Empires (Hillsong United album) =

Studio album by Hillsong United
- Released: 26 May 2015
- Recorded: 2014
- Genres: Contemporary worship music; contemporary Christian music; electropop; new wave; indie pop; EDM
- Length: 71:31
- Labels: Hillsong; Sparrow; Capitol CMG
- Producers: Michael Guy Chislett; Joel Houston

Hillsong United studio album chronology
Zion (2013)	Empires (2015)	Wonder (2017)

Hillsong United chronology
The White Album (2014)	Empires (2015)	Of Dirt and Grace: Live from the Land (2016)

Singles from Empires
- 1. "Touch the Sky" Released: 24 March 2015; 2. "Say the Word" Released: 1 February 2016

Empires is the fourth studio album by the Australian band Hillsong United, a contemporary worship music band from Hillsong Church. The album was released on 26 May 2015, under Hillsong Music, Sparrow Records and Capitol Christian Music Group. Michael Guy Chislett served as the album's producer, with vocalist Joel Houston serving as creative director and co-producer. "Touch the Sky" was released as the album's lead single in March 2015. The album won the Worship Album of the Year at the 47th Dove Awards.

== Background ==
The cover of Empires was launched into space on 12 March 2015. To further promote the album, the group performed single "Touch the Sky" on the Today Show on 2 April 2015. The album is United's fourth studio album, and was released on 26 May 2015 by Hillsong Music and Sparrow Records. It was released in CD, digital download, and vinyl formats.

== Singles ==
The lead single from the album was "Touch the Sky", which was released to digital retailers on 24 March 2015, and to Christian radio on 11 April 2015.

"Say the Word" was released as the second single from the album on 1 February 2016.

=== Promotional singles ===
"Prince of Peace" was released to digital retailers on 21 April 2015 as a promotional single followed by "Heart Like Heaven", released to the iTunes Store and as a lyric video on Hillsong United's YouTube channel on 18 May 2015.

== Critical reception ==
Professional ratings
Review scores
Source	Rating
CCM Magazine	3.5/5 stars
Christian Music Review	4.0/5
CM Addict	5/5 stars
Cross Rhythms	10/10 squares
FDRMX	5/5 stars
Jesus Freak Hideout	4.5/5 stars 3.5/5 stars 4/5 stars
Louder Than the Music	5/5 stars
New Release Tuesday	4/5 stars
USA Today	2.5/4 stars
Worship Leader	4.5/5 stars

Giving the album three and a half stars at CCM Magazine, Caroline Lusk says, "Empires is a stunning display of universally relevant themes". Brian Mansfield, rating the album two and a half stars out of four for USA Today, states, "Empires focuses on submission and service." Rating the album four stars from New Release Tuesday, Marcus Hathcock describes feeling "awkward", after he finished listening to the album. Awarding the album five stars from FDRMX, Jessica Morris writes, "Hillsong UNITED have done an extraordinary job in putting together and delivering an album that is both authentic and of the highest quality."

Ryan Barbee, giving the album four and a half stars for Jesus Freak Hideout, says, "Empires, might continue to walk the love/hate line for some people". Rating the album three and a half stars at Jesus Freak Hideout, Mark Rice writes, "Empires all the way through almost relegates it to the status of a lullaby album", as compared to their previous offering. Scott Fryberer, awarding the album four stars from Jesus Freak Hideout, states, "United doesn't necessarily win points for the most creative lyricism, but they're leagues above where they used to be". Indicating in a four and a half star review from Worship Leader, Jeremy Armstrong writes, "paradoxes of faith and God's greatness resound throughout."

Awarding the album five stars at Louder Than the Music, Jono Davies says it's simply, "Superb." Abby Baracskai, rating the album a 4.0 out of five for Christian Music Review, states, "the album was interesting to listen to musically because of all the minute details compiled together to create unique sounds, and lyric wise because of the important messages they illustrate." Giving the album five stars from CM Addict, Michael Tackett writes, "Simply put…Empires is a masterpiece." Tony Cummings, affixing a ten out of ten rating upon the album at Cross Rhythms, says, "United have produced a classic album with the potential to change tens of thousands of lives."

== Commercial performance ==
In the United States, the album debuted at No. 5 on the Billboard 200 chart in its first week with 50,000 units, 47,000 of which are pure album sales, making this Hillsong United's best ever sales week. It also debuted at No. 1 on the Top Christian Albums chart and No. 2 on the Digital Albums. The album has sold 122,000 copies in the United States as of June 2016.

== Accolades ==
This album was No. 12, on the Worship Leader's Top 20 Albums of 2015 list.

The song, "Heart Like Heaven", was No. 6, on the Worship Leader's Top 20 Songs of 2015 list.

== Track listing ==
Standard edition
No.	Title	Writer(s)	Worship leader	Length
1.	"Here Now (Madness)"	Joel Houston; Michael Guy Chislett	Jad Gillies; Joel Houston	7:22
2.	"Say the Word"	Houston	Taya Smith	4:24
3.	"Heart Like Heaven"	Matt Crocker; Houston	Jad Gillies	6:29
4.	"Touch the Sky"	Houston; Dylan Thomas; Chislett	Taya Smith	4:22
5.	"Street Called Mercy"	Crocker; Houston	Jonathan Douglass; Matt Crocker; Taya Smith	4:21
6.	"When I Lost My Heart to You (Hallelujah)"	Houston	Joel Houston	4:45
7.	"Even When It Hurts (Praise Song)"	Houston	Taya Smith	6:18
8.	"Prince of Peace"	Houston; Crocker; Thomas	Joel Houston	5:56
9.	"Empires"	Houston; Thomas; Chris Davenport; Ben Tennikoff	Jad Gillies	8:14
10.	"Rule"	Crocker; Houston; Tennikoff	Matt Crocker	4:12
11.	"Captain"	Benjamin Hastings; Seth Simmons	Taya Smith	5:31
12.	"Closer Than You Know"	Houston; Crocker; Chislett	Joel Houston; Taya Smith	9:30
Total length:				71:31

Target bonus track
No.	Title	Writer(s)	Worship Leader	Length
13.	"Sunburst"	Crocker; Houston; Scott Ligertwood; Chislett	Matt Crocker	5:19
Total length:				1:16:50

Notes

- Worship leaders for each song can be found at this link.

== Personnel ==
- Joel Houston - lead vocals, acoustic guitar, keyboards, bass, piano, moog bass
- Michael Guy Chislett - electric guitar, percussion, programming
- Jad Gillies - lead vocals, guitar
- Matt Crocker - lead vocals, acoustic guitar
- Jonathon "JD" Douglass - lead vocals
- Taya Smith - lead vocals
- Dylan Thomas - electric guitar
- Benjamin Tennikoff - keyboards, glockenspiel, piano, synthesizers, percussion
- Adam Crosariol - bass
- Simon Kobler - drums

Additional musicians

- Desmond Annabel - trombone, euphonium
- Marcus Beaumont - electric guitar
- Matt Tennikoff - bass
- Peter James - keyboards, piano
- Tim Whincop - trumpet

== Charts ==
=== Album ===
Weekly charts

Chart (2015)	Peak position
Australian Albums (ARIA)	1
Belgian Albums (Ultratop Flanders)	124
Belgian Albums (Ultratop Wallonia)	164
Dutch Albums (Album Top 100)	12
Hungarian Albums (MAHASZ)	19
New Zealand Albums (RMNZ)	7
Norwegian Albums (VG-lista)	7
UK Albums (Official Charts)	34
US Billboard 200	5
US Top Christian Albums (Billboard)	1

Year-end charts

Chart (2015)	Position
Australian Albums (ARIA)	53

=== Singles ===
Year	Single	Peak chart positions			
Year	Single	US Christian	Christian Airplay	Christian Digital Songs	Christian Streaming Songs
2015	"Touch the Sky"	3	5	1	8
2016	"Say the Word"	24	29	–	–
