= Oceans (Where Feet May Fail) =

2013 song by Hillsong United

Single by Hillsong United

from the album Zion
- Released: 23 August 2013
- Recorded: 2012
- Genre: Worship
- Length: 8:55 (Album version); 4:09 (Radio version); 4:19 (Spanish version)
- Label: Hillsong; Capitol CMG
- Songwriters: Matt Crocker; Joel Houston; Salomon Ligthelm
- Producer: Michael Guy Chislett

Hillsong United singles chronology
"Scandal of Grace" (2013)	"Oceans (Where Feet May Fail)" (2013)	"Touch the Sky" (2015)

Music videos
- "Oceans (Where Feet May Fail) Lyric Video" on YouTube
- "Océanos (Donde Mis Pies Pueden Fallar)" on YouTube
- "Oceans (Where Feet May Fail) (Radio Version) on YouTube
- "Oceans (Where Feet May Fail) (From the Zion Acoustic Sessions) on YouTube
- "Oceans (Where Feet May Fail) (From of Dirt and Grace)" on YouTube
- "Oceans (Where Feet May Fail) (Live at Colour Conference)" on YouTube
- "Oceans (Where Feet May Fail) (Live in Israel)" on YouTube
- "Oceans (Where Feet May Fail) (Live at Hillsong Conference)" on YouTube

"Oceans (Where Feet May Fail)" is a song by Australian worship group Hillsong United. It was released on 23 August 2013 as the second and final single from their third studio album, Zion (2013). The song is led by Taya Smith, and was written by Matt Crocker, Joel Houston and Salomon Ligthelm, with production being handled by Michael Guy Chislett.

In the United States, the song spent a record 61 non-consecutive weeks at No. 1 on the Billboard Hot Christian Songs chart. In the year-end summaries, it was the chart's No. 1 song in 2014 and 2016, No. 2 in 2015, and No. 10 in 2017. Billboard ranked it as the No. 1 Christian song of the 2010s decade. The song was certified quadruple platinum in the United States and widely considered to be one of the most popular CCM songs of all time.

It won the Dove Award for Song of the Year in 2014.

== Writing and background ==
The song ideas began early in the production of the album. Crocker worked with Ligthelm later back in Australia to write more of the lyrics and Ligthelm helped deciding that the theme of the song should be about stepping into the unknown and Peter having blind trust to walk on water. Much of the melody was written over the course of 10 days at Houston's apartment in New York. The last lyrics were written at a waterfall on the final day of recording.

The song was recorded by singer Taya Smith who sang many parts of the song in one take.

== Awards ==
The song won many of the main categories at the 2014 GMA Dove Awards. It won the "Song of the Year", "Contemporary Christian Performance of the Year", "Pop/Contemporary Song of the Year", "Worship Song of the Year", and Hillsong United was named the "Artist of the Year". In turn, the Australian group was the winner in the Top Christian Artist category and the song "Oceans (Where Feet May Fail)" was chosen as Top Christian Song at the 2016 Billboard Music Awards.

== Critical reception ==
Ryan Barbee of Jesus Freak Hideout said "'Oceans (Where Feet May Fail)' continues [the album] with a more intimate tone and will surely grasp the heart of the listener as the song reiterates, 'Spirit lead me where my trust is without borders [sic], let me walk upon the waters wherever you would call me'. The music builds and builds to a gorgeous climax that will pull on your heartstrings whilst being encouraged by the faith that only the Holy Spirit can give." Louder Than the Music's Jono Davies stated "[Oceans] has a stunning orchestral opening before out of nowhere a voice hits you. The voice is stunning, yet haunting, all in the same breath. The song then builds musically from atmospheric haunting tones to sheer epicness. I can hear people just getting lost in worship at a Hillsong conference to this song."

In 2021, Dutch DJ group Dash Berlin created a remix of the song. Hungarian artist Ekhoe sampled the song in his 2023 song Százszorszép.

== Chart performance ==
"Oceans (Where Feet May Fail)" reached No. 1 on the Billboard Hot Christian Songs chart, and stayed atop of the charts for 45 consecutive weeks until it was dethroned by Carrie Underwood's "Something in the Water" in October 2014. The song rebounded to No. 1 for another five weeks until the chart week of 23 May 2015, marking a total of 50 non-consecutive weeks atop of the chart. In total, the song spent a record 61 weeks atop of the chart.

"Oceans (Where Feet May Fail)" also charted on the Billboard Hot 100 music chart, debuting the week of 1 February 2014 at number 99; it later made its peak at number 83 on 15 March.

As of May 2022, the song has the most total weeks on Billboard's "Hot Christian Songs" chart with 191 weeks.

It became the longest running No. 1 song on the chart, before "You Say" broke the record in 2019.

== Track listing ==
Digital download
No.	Title	Length
1.	"Oceans (Where Feet May Fail)"	8:55

Digital download
No.	Title	Length
1.	"Océanos (Donde Mis Pies Pueden Fallar)"	4:19

== Charts ==
=== Weekly charts ===
Chart (2013–2017)	Peak position
US Billboard Hot 100	83
US Hot Christian Songs (Billboard)	1
US Christian Airplay (Billboard)	1
US Christian AC (Billboard)	3
US Heatseekers Songs (Billboard)	11

Chart (2022)	Peak position
South Africa (RISA)	85

=== Year-end charts ===
Chart (2014)	Peak position
US Christian Songs (Billboard)	1
US Christian Airplay (Billboard)	3
US Christian AC (Billboard)	3

Chart (2015)	Peak position
US Christian Songs (Billboard)	2

Chart (2016)	Peak position
US Christian Songs (Billboard)	1

Chart (2017)	Peak position
US Christian Songs (Billboard)	10

Chart (2018)	Position
US Christian Digital Song Sales (Billboard)	15

Chart (2019)	Position
US Christian Digital Song Sales (Billboard)	9

Chart (2020)	Position
US Christian Digital Song Sales (Billboard)	20

Chart (2025)	Position
US Christian Digital Song Sales (Billboard)	24
US Christian Streaming Songs (Billboard)	9

=== Decade-end charts ===
Chart (2010s)	Position
US Christian Songs (Billboard)	1

== Certifications ==
Region	Certification	Certified units/sales
Canada (Music Canada)	2× Platinum	160,000^{‡}
United Kingdom (BPI)	Silver	200,000^{‡}
United States (RIAA)	4× Platinum	4,000,000^{‡}
^{‡} Sales+streaming figures based on certification alone.

== Release history ==
Region	Date	Format	Label	Ref.
Australia	22 February 2013	Digital download	Hillsong; Capitol CMG	
Worldwide	23 February 2013	Digital download	Hillsong; Capitol CMG	
United States	26 February 2013	Digital download	Hillsong; Capitol CMG	
United States	23 August 2013	Christian radio	Sparrow	
Worldwide	30 September 2014	Digital download (Spanish version)	Hillsong; Capitol CMG; Sparrow	
