= Across the Earth =

Across the Earth: Tear Down The Walls

Live album by Hillsong United
- Released: 9 May 2009
- Recorded: 2008 (Hillsong Convention Centre) and 2009 (Hillsong Convention Centre, The Hub Auditorium and Studios 301, Sydney, Australia)
- Genre: Contemporary worship
- Length: 71:58
- Label: Hillsong Music Australia
- Producers: Andrew Crawford, Joel Houston, Michael Guy Chislett

Hillsong United chronology
| The I Heart Revolution: With Hearts as One (2008) | Across the Earth: Tear Down The Walls (2009) | Aftermath (2011) |

Professional ratings
Review scores
| Source | Rating |
|---|---|
| Christian Music Zine | A |

Across the Earth: Tear Down the Walls (stylized as [a_CROSS // the_EARTH] :: Tear Down The Walls) is the name for the 11th Hillsong United album.

The album recording took place during three different nights, including a studio session for one of the songs. Four of the songs on the album were recorded in 2008 during the annual EncounterFest at the Hillsong Convention Centre in Sydney, Australia and the other seven songs were recorded in 2009 during two different nights. The first one on 1 March 2009 at Hillsong Convention Centre (the same night in which a bunch of songs were recorded for the Hillsong Live's Faith+Hope+Love album) and on 13 February 2009 at The Hub Auditorium, Hillsong Church. The difference in this project is in the song "Soon", that was recorded at Studios 301 in Sydney, Australia, with a choir and mixed with the live songs.

The album package comes with no booklet, a concept to sustain the idea of "Tear Down The Wall", in which the CD was totally visible though the case.

It was released in Australia on 9 May 2009. The album reached No. 22 on the ARIA Albums Chart.

Originally a two-part project, the plans were later scrapped.

== Track listing ==
Album release
| No. | Title | Writer(s) | Worship leader(s) | Length |
|---|---|---|---|---|
| 1. | "Freedom Is Here" (Recorded on 1 March 2009 at Hillsong Convention Centre) | Reuben Morgan, Scott Ligertwood | Jad Gillies | 5:40 |
| 2. | "No Reason To Hide" (Recorded on 4 October 2008, at EncounterFest, Hillsong Convention Centre) | Matt Crocker, Joel Houston | Joel Houston, Jonathon Douglass | 4:43 |
| 3. | "More Than Anything" (Recorded on 13 February 2009 at Fuel, The Hub Auditorium, Hillsong Church) | Joel Davies, Braden Lang | David Ware, Jonathon Douglass | 3:54 |
| 4. | "King Of All Days" (Recorded on 4 October 2008, at EncounterFest, Hillsong Convention Centre) | Dylan Thomas | Dylan Thomas, Annie Garratt | 6:19 |
| 5. | "Desert Song" (Recorded on 1 March 2009 at Hillsong Convention Centre) | Brooke Ligertwood | Brooke Ligertwood | 4:41 |
| 6. | "Oh You Bring" (Recorded on 13 February 2009 at Fuel, The Hub Auditorium, Hillsong Church) | Matt Crocker | Matt Crocker | 7:03 |
| 7. | "Tear Down The Walls" (Recorded on 4 October 2008, at EncounterFest, Hillsong Convention Centre) | Joel Houston, Matt Crocker | Joel Houston | 10:22 |
| 8. | "Soon" (Recorded at Studios 301, Sydney, Australia) | Brooke Ligertwood | Brooke Ligertwood | 5:48 |
| 9. | "You Hold Me Now" (Recorded on 4 October 2008, at EncounterFest, Hillsong Convention Centre) | Reuben Morgan, Matt Crocker | Matt Crocker | 8:28 |
| 10. | "Arms Open Wide" (Recorded on 13 February 2009 at Fuel, The Hub Auditorium, Hillsong Church) | Sam Knock | Sam Knock | 6:18 |
| 11. | "Your Name High" (Recorded on 13 February 2009 at Fuel, The Hub Auditorium, Hillsong Church) | Joel Houston | Jonathon Douglass | 5:05 |
| 12. | "Yours Forever" (Recorded on 13 February 2009 at Fuel, The Hub Auditorium, Hillsong Church) | Joel Davies, Braden Lang | Joel Davies | 3:40 |
| Total length: | | | | 71:58 |

== Personnel ==
- Worship leaders – Joel Houston, Brooke Ligertwood, Jad Gillies, Annie Garratt, Jonathon Douglass, Matt Crocker, David Ware, Sam Knock, Dylan Thomas, Joel Davies.
- Drums – Simon Kobler, Brandon Gillies
- Bass – Adam Crosariol, Ben Whincop
- Electric Guitars – Michael Guy Chislett, Timon Klein, Joel Hingston, Jad Gillies, Dylan Thomas, Andrew Hood, Nigel Hendroff
- Acoustic Guitars – Joel Houston, Jad Gillies, Brooke Ligertwood, Nigel Hendroff
- Keys – Autumn Hardman, Peter James, Ben Tennikoff, Michael Guy Chislett

== Charts ==
| Chart (2009) | Peak position |
|---|---|
| Australian ARIA Albums Chart | 22 |
| New Zealand Albums Chart | 21 |
| U.S. Billboard 200 | 21 |
| U.S. Billboard Christian Albums | 1 |
| U.S. Billboard Digital Albums | 56 |
| Australia iTunes Top Albums Chart | 1 |
| U.S. iTunes Top Albums Chart | 1 |

Year-end charts

| Chart (2009) | Position |
|---|---|
| US Billboard Christian Albums | 22 |
