= The I Heart Revolution: With Hearts as One =

The I Heart Revolution: With Hearts as One (CD)

Live album by Hillsong United
- Released: 8 March 2008
- Genre: Contemporary worship music
- Length: 155:04
- Label: Hillsong Music Australia
- Producer: Andrew Crawford, Joel Houston, Jad Gillies

Hillsong United chronology
All of the Above (2007)	The I Heart Revolution: With Hearts as One (CD) (2008)	Across the Earth: Tear Down the Walls (2009)

The I Heart Revolution: With Hearts as One is the ninth album by Hillsong United and the first of the three-part "I Heart Revolution" project. With Hearts as One was recorded around the world across the span of two years, and contains thirty songs. The album was released in Australia on 8 March 2008, and internationally on various later dates. It peaked at No. 8 on the ARIA Albums Chart. The album was initially released in both physical and digital formats, along with a USB release. A companion DVD was also released in September 2008.

The second part, The I Heart Revolution: We're All in This Together, is a feature film documentary which was released in cinemas beginning November 2009.

== Background ==
In 2006, Hillsong United's key songwriter and creative director Joel Houston proposed a three-part series of releases under the banner of "The I Heart Revolution", stating it's not about loving revolution, but simply about the revolution of the use of the term "I heart...". The first of these was initially to be the eighth album (and first studio album) by Hillsong United. That album was simply released with the title All of the Above. The second of these to be part of the series was to be an extended play release compiled of performances by Hillsong United's under 21-year-old members. This ended up being released without the I Heart Revolution title also, only under the title In a Valley by the Sea. Finally, having recorded every performance by themselves for the prior two years, Hillsong United decided to release a compilation album comprising the best performances of the best of the whole era of Hillsong United, while including two new songs, "You'll Come", written and performed by Brooke Fraser, and "Love Enough", written by Braden Lang and Scott Ligertwood and performed by Jonathon Douglass, who had previously sung the song for the Under 21 EP, but not for a "full" Hillsong United album. Both of these new songs were performed in Sydney, while all other songs included were from throughout the world. As the album was recorded throughout the world, the cover art also features notable landmarks from throughout the world, including O Cristo Redentor (Christ the Redeemer), which appears two times on the cover, including at the centre of the heart. Others featured include the Empire State Building, the Eiffel Tower, the Colosseum, Big Ben, the Statue of Liberty and various pictures of people from throughout the world.

== Release ==
=== Formats ===
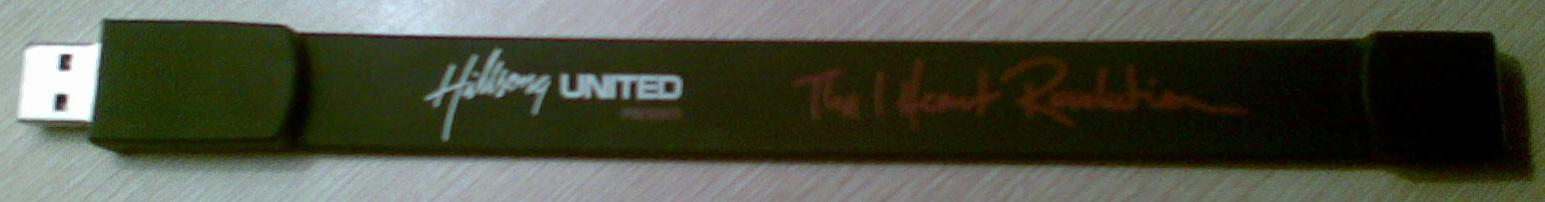
The wristband for The I Heart Revolution: With Hearts as One

As with most albums, it was released as a CD and also on digital music retailers, but was also released on a one gigabyte USB flash drive, enveloped in a black rubber wristband. This USB version included all of the songs in MP3 format, the lyrical overhead master sheets, a PDF copy of the liner sleeve, and the two versions of the album cover.

The live DVD version, with documentary elements and overlays from cities, worship events and moments around the world, was released in September 2008. The DVD will feature a selection of 18 songs from the CD version.

=== Charts ===
In its first eligible week, beginning 23 March 2008, the album peaked at No. 8 in the albums section of ARIA Charts and remained in the charts for the following three weeks, in lower positions. In New Zealand, it charted at No. 36 in its week of release, though climbed to its peak position of No. 22 in the following week of 17 March 2008. In the US, it peaked at No. 117 on the Billboard 200 albums chart on 19 April 2008.

== Track listing ==
Track	Song title	Length	Composer(s)	Performance location(s)	Worship leader(s)
Disc A
01	"The Time Has Come"	06:25	Joel Houston	São Paulo, Brazil	Joel Houston
02	"One Way"	03:38	Jonathon Douglass and Houston	Tokyo, Japan	Jonathon Douglass
03	"What The World Will Never Take"	04:16	Marty Sampson, Matt Crocker and Scott Ligertwood	Amsterdam, Netherlands	Jonathon Douglass
04	"'Til I See You"	06:06	Joel Houston and Jad Gillies	Edinburgh, Scotland	Annie Garratt
05	"Take All Of Me"	08:03	Marty Sampson	Lisbon, Portugal and Paris, France	Jad Gillies
06	"The Stand"	05:33	Joel Houston	Shanghai, China + Vancouver, Canada	Joel Houston
07	"You'll Come"	06:23	Brooke Fraser	Sydney, Australia	Brooke Fraser
08	"Break Free"	04:10	Joel Houston, Matt Crocker and Scott Ligertwood	Oslo, Norway	Jonathon Douglass
09	"Look To You"	04:15	Marty Sampson	Johannesburg, South Africa	Marty Sampson
10	"Where The Love Lasts Forever"	06:04	Joel Houston	Kyiv, Ukraine	Joel Houston
11	"Forever"	04:16	Marty Sampson	Seoul, South Korea	Michelle Fragar
12	"There Is Nothing Like"	07:50	Marty Sampson and Jonas Myrin	London, England	Marty Sampson
13	"Tell The World"	04:35	Jonathon Douglass, Joel Houston and Marty Sampson	Jakarta, Indonesia	Jonathon Douglass
14	"All Day"	05:19	Marty Sampson	Mexico City, Mexico	Jonathon Douglass
Disc B
01	"Take It All"	03:37	Marty Sampson, Matt Crocker and Scott Ligertwood	Manila, Philippines	Jonathon Douglass
02	"My Future Decided"	03:35	Jonathon Douglas and Joel Houston	Memphis, United States	Jonathon Douglass
03	"All I Need Is You"	06:01	Marty Sampson	Cape Town, South Africa	Marty Sampson
04	"Mighty To Save"	05:05	Reuben Morgan and Ben Fielding	Orlando, United States	Reuben Morgan
05	"Nothing But The Blood"	03:50	Traditional hymn	New Jersey, United States	Brooke Fraser
06	"Hosanna"	06:14	Brooke Fraser	Berlin, Germany	Brooke Fraser
07	"Fuego De Dios (Fire Fall Down)"	01:41	Matt Crocker	Asunción, Paraguay	Joel Houston
08	"Shout Unto God"	04:15	Joel Houston and Marty Sampson	Buenos Aires, Argentina and Copenhagen, Denmark	Joel Houston
09	"Salvation Is Here"	04:04	Joel Houston	Budapest, Hungary	Joel Houston
10	"Love Enough"	03:05	Braden Lang and Scott Ligertwood	Sydney, Australia	Jonathon Douglass and Braden Lang
11	"More Than Life"	06:30	Morgan	Orlando, United States	Reuben Morgan
12	"None But Jesus"	07:59	Brooke Fraser	Toronto, Canada and Buenos Aires, Argentina	Brooke Fraser and Annie Garratt
13	"From The Inside Out"	06:00	Joel Houston	Rio de Janeiro, Brazil	Joel Houston (Backing Vocal : Annie Garratt)
14	"Came To My Rescue"	03:44	Marty Sampson, Dylan Thomas and Joel Davies	Kuala Lumpur, Malaysia	Joel Houston
15	"Saviour King"	07:04	Marty Sampson and Mia Fieldes	Västerås, Sweden	Jad Gillies
16	"Solution"	05:56	Joel Houston and Matt Crocker	Los Angeles, United States	Joel Houston

=== DVD track list ===
==== Performances ====
• 01. — "The Time Has Come" — 06:25

• 02. — "One Way" — 03:38

• 03. — "What The World Will Never Take" — 04:16

• 04. — "Look To You" — 04:15

• 05. — "Take All Of Me" — 08:03

• 06. — "The Stand" — 05:32

• 07. — "Nothing But The Blood" — 03:50

• 08. — "Hosanna" — 06:14

• 09. — "Fuego De Dios (Fire Fall Down)" — 01:41

• 10. — "Shout Unto God" — 04:15

• 11. — "Love Enough" — 03:05

• 12. — "Take It All" (Spanish) — 08:04

• 13. — "All I Need Is You" — 06:01

• 14. — "None But Jesus" — 07:59

• 15. — "From The Inside Out" (Spanish) — 06:00

• 16. — "Came To My Rescue" — 03:44

• 17. — "Salvation Is Here" — 04:04

• 18. — "Tell The World" — 04:35

• 19. — "Solution" — 05:56

==== Special features ====
1. "Point of Difference" [Music Video]
2. Behind the Scenes: Live Moments, Tour Blogs and more

== Album personnel ==
Mixed By

- James Rudder
- Andrew Crawford

Recording Engineers

- Brad Law
- Steve Pippett
- Andrew Crawford
- Phil Blackbourn

Record Assistant Engineers

- Josh Nickel
- James Hurley

== People Who Made It Sound Good - DVD Credits ==
Assistant DVD Mixing

- Jim Monk
- Ben Whincop

Mastered By

- Tom Cryne
- Leon Zervos

Post Production Senior Engineer

- Ben Whincop

Post Production Record Engineers

- Phil Blackbourn
- Andrew Crawford
- Peter Wallis
- Trevor Beck
- Jim Monk
- Josh Nickel
- James Hurley

== Charts ==
Year-end charts

Chart (2008)	Position
US Billboard Christian Albums	29
