= Look to You =

Live album by Hillsong United
- Released: 28 February 2005
- Recorded: 9 October 2004, Encounterfest, Hillsong Convention Centre
- Genre: Contemporary worship music
- Length: 69:23
- Label: Hillsong Music Australia
- Producer: Darlene Zschech, Reuben Morgan

Hillsong United chronology
More Than Life (2004)	Look to You (2005)	United We Stand (2006)

Look to You is the sixth live praise and worship album by Hillsong United. The CD comes with a free DVD which includes documentary footage, interviews and 'behind the scenes'. The album reached No. 30 on the ARIA Albums Chart.

== Track listing ==
Standard edition
No.	Title	Writer(s)	Worship leader	Length
1.	"Salvation Is Here"	Joel Houston	Joel Houston	04:43
2.	"Tell The World"	Jonathon Douglass, Houston, Marty Sampson	Marty Sampson, Jonathon Douglass	04:05
3.	"Look To You"	Sampson	Marty Sampson	05:22
4.	"All I Need Is You"	Sampson	Marty Sampson	06:27
5.	"All For Love"	Mia Fieldes	Holly Dawson, Jad Gillies	05:57
6.	"Shout Unto God"	Houston, Sampson	Joel Houston, Marty Sampson	03:17
7.	"There Is Nothing Like"	Sampson, Jonas Myrin	Tulele Faletolu	07:31
8.	"What The World Will Never Take"	Matt Crocker, Scott Ligertwood, Sampson	Marty Sampson	03:06
9.	"Only One"	Joel Davies	Jonathon Douglass	03:48
10.	"Deeper"	Sampson	Marty Sampson	06:31
11.	"'Til I See You"	Jad Gillies, Houston	Joel Houston	06:09
12.	"Rest In You"	Fieldes	Holly Dawson	07:17
13.	"Awesome God"	Rich Mullins	Joel Houston	05:19
Total length:				69:19

DVD
No.	Title	Length
1.	"Look To You"	05:22
2.	"Salvation Is Here"	04:43
3.	"Tell The World"	04:05
4.	"All I Need Is You"	06:27
5.	"All For Love / Shout Unto God"	09:14
6.	"There Is Nothing Like"	07:31
7.	"What The World Will Never Take"	03:06
8.	"Awesome God"	05:19

== Personnel ==
Senior pastors

- Brian and Bobbie Houston

Youth Pastors

- Phil and Lucinda Dooley

Producers

- Darlene Zschech

Assistant producers

- Reuben Morgan

Lead vocals

- Jonathan Douglass
- Holly Dawson
- Tulele Faletolu
- Michelle Fragar

Backing vocals

- Kirsty Thorntrwaite
- Anneka Kelly
- Sam Knock
- Jay Hoors
- Kylie Fisher
- Mia Fieldes

Worship leaders/acoustic guitars

- Joel Houston
- Marty Sampson

Songwriters

- Joel Houston
- Marty Sampson
- Jonathan Douglass
- Mia Fieldes
- Jad Gillies
- Scott Ligertwood
- Matt Crocker
- Rich Mullins

Cover art

- Outside the City and Buildings, Helicopters
- Cover depicts Joel Houston, Peter James, Marty Sampson, Holly Dawson, Jad Gillies and Matt Tenikoff in the main image

Musicians

Electric Guitars

- Marcus Beaumont
- Nathan Taylor
- Jad Gillies
- Marty Sampson

Keyboards

- Kevin Lee
- Peter James

Bass

- Matt Tenikoff

Drums

- Luke Munns
- Rolf Wam Fjell

Record scratcher

- Duncan Beaumont

Drum technician

- Sam O' Donell

Guitar technicians

- Reece Turbin
- Rob Tartos

Vocal director

- Dee Uluirewa

Choir

- Hillsong Church Youth Choir

== Bonus DVD ==
The live DVD contains hidden tracks:

1. Japanese conference attendees singing one complete song "One Way". To access, press menu when "What the World Will Never Take" is playing and select the new option in yellow on the screen.
2. A remixed version of "Look to You" created by Hamish McDonald (of Paradyme Studios Australia) accompanied by random visualizations. To access press menu when "What the World Will Never Take" is playing, go to "Song Selection", press enter, highlight "Main Menu", press down then enter.
