= All of the Above (Hillsong United album) =

Studio album by Hillsong United
- Released: 17 March 2007
- Recorded: 2006
- Genre: Contemporary worship music: Indie Rock; Indie pop; Alternative Rock
- Length: 73:11
- Label: Hillsong Music Australia
- Producer: Joel Houston, Michael Guy Chislett, Paul Mabury, James Rudder

Hillsong United studio album chronology
All of the Above (2007)	Aftermath (2011)

Hillsong United chronology
United We Stand (2006)	All of the Above (2007)	The I Heart Revolution: With Hearts as One (2008)

All of the Above is the first studio album and overall eighth album by Hillsong United and the first of a three-part global project. The album includes a DVD containing three live worship tracks recorded at the 2006 Encounterfest youth conference, a sermon from Phil Dooley and a bonus features section. It debuted at No. 6 on the ARIA Albums Chart on 26 March 2007.

It has also reached number 1 on the Billboard's Top Christian/Gospel Albums, No. 1 on the iTunes Christian music digital album sales, No. 1 on the Nielsen Christian SoundScan chart, and has moved to No. 60 on the Billboard US Top 200.

== Track listing ==
Album release
No.	Title	Writer(s)	Worship leader(s)	Length
1.	"Point Of Difference"	Joel Houston	Joel Houston	4:25
2.	"Break Free"	Houston, Matt Crocker, Scott Ligertwood	Jonathan Douglass	4:10
3.	"Desperate People"	Houston, Michael Guy Chislett	Joel Houston	5:32
4.	"Devotion"	Marty Sampson	Marty Sampson	6:02
5.	"Draw Me Closer (Interlude)"	Dean Ussher	Jad Gillies	1:29
6.	"Lead Me To The Cross"	Brooke Fraser	Brooke Fraser	4:21
7.	"Found"	Dave George	Jad Gillies	6:05
8.	"Hosanna"	Brooke Fraser	Brooke Fraser	5:33
9.	"For All Who Are To Come (Interlude)"	Dean Ussher	Brooke Fraser, Jad Gillies	3:40
10.	"Solution"	Houston, Crocker	Joel Houston	4:40
11.	"My Future Decided"	Jonathon Douglass, Houston	Jonathan Douglass	4:21
12.	"Never Let Me Go"	Houston	Joel Houston	6:04
13.	"You"	Dylan Thomas, Paul Andrew	Annie Garratt	5:06
14.	"Saviour King"	Sampson, Mia Fieldes	Jad Gillies	12:19
Total length:				73:08

A Music Video Has Been Made For The Album's Song "Point Of Difference" which was officially released and first shown at Jam United in July 2007.

== Awards ==
In 2008, the album was nominated for a Dove Award for Praise & Worship Album of the Year at the 39th GMA Dove Awards.

== Featured Musicians ==
Guitars (Electric) -- Michael Guy Chislett, Timon Klein, Jad Gillies

Guitars (Acoustic) -- Brooke Fraser, Marty Sampson, Joel Houston

Bass—Matthew Tennikoff

Drums—Rolf Wam Fjell, Gabriel Kelly

Keyboards—Peter James

== Charts ==
Chart (2007)	Peak position
U.S. Billboard 200	60
U.S. Billboard Christian Albums	1
U.S. Billboard Digital Albums	60
Australian ARIA Albums Chart	6
New Zealand Albums Chart	13

Year-end charts

Chart (2007)	Position
US Billboard Christian Albums	41

Chart procession and succession

== Notes ==
- This album is the first of a three-part project announced on Joel Houston's MySpace "... we've spent the last week recording the first installment in what I'm considering a trilogy of very different projects we have in store..." The others are theiheartrevolution and In a Valley by the Sea, an under-21s live EP project played by Hillsong United members who are under 21 years old.
- "Break Free", "Hosanna" and "Saviour King" are also on the annual live praise-and-worship album, Saviour King.
