= United We Stand (Hillsong United album) =

Live album by Hillsong United
- Released: 11 March 2006
- Recorded: 8 October 2005
- Venue: Encounterfest, Hillsong Convention Centre
- Genre: Contemporary worship music
- Length: 75:44
- Label: Hillsong Music Australia
- Producer: Joel Houston

Hillsong United chronology
Look to You (2005)	United We Stand (2006)	All of the Above (2007)

United We Stand is the seventh live praise and worship album by Hillsong United. The CD comes with a free DVD which includes documentary footage, interviews and a bonus "United" Documentary. The album reached No. 28 on the ARIA Albums Chart.

== Track listing ==
Standard edition
No.	Title	Writer(s)	Worship leader	Length
1.	"An Introduction"	Michael Guy Chislett		01:33
2.	"The Time Has Come"	Joel Houston	Joel Houston	04:41
3.	"Take It All"	Marty Sampson, Matt Crocker, Scott Ligertwood	Marty Sampson	03:09
4.	"From God Above"	Sampson	Jonathon Douglass, Marty Sampson	03:22
5.	"From The Inside Out"	Houston	Joel Houston	06:19
6.	"Came To My Rescue"	Sampson, Dylan Thomas, Joel Davies	Marty Sampson, Annie Garratt	04:59
7.	"A Reprise"	Sampson, Thomas, Davies	Marty Sampson	02:53
8.	"None But Jesus"	Brooke Fraser	Brooke Fraser	05:30
9.	"Selah"		Brooke Fraser	01:44
10.	"Fire Fall Down"	Crocker	Marty Sampson	10:52
11.	"Revolution"	Chislett, Fraser, Houston, Ligertwood, Sampson	Jonathon Douglass	03:45
12.	"Kingdom Come"	Ben Fielding	Jad Gillies	04:59
13.	"No One Like You"	Houston	Joel Houston	02:38
14.	"Sovereign Hands"	Mia Fieldes	Holly Dawson	05:15
15.	"The Stand"	Houston	Joel Houston	06:52
16.	"Selah"		Jad Gillies	03:38
17.	"Hallelujah"	Rolf Wam Fjell, Sampson, Matthew Tennikoff	Joel Houston	03:45
Total length:				75:37

Bonus DVD
No.	Title	Length
1.	"An Introduction"
2.	"The Time Has Come"
3.	"From God Above"
4.	"From The Inside Out"
5.	"Came To My Rescue" (A Reprise)
6.	"Fire Fall Down"
7.	"Revolution"
8.	"Take It All"
9.	"The Stand"
10.	"Selah"
11.	"Credits" ("Hallelujah" playing during credits)

Notes

- "An Introduction" is stylized as "* (An Introduction)".
- "A Reprise" is stylized as "** (A Reprise)".
- The two "Selah" interludes are stylized as "*** (Selah)" and "**** (Selah)".

== Unidos Permanecemos ==
Hillsong United has also recorded a Spanish version of United We Stand called Unidos Permanecemos.

== Personnel ==
- Marty Sampson – worship leader, acoustic guitar
- Joel Houston – worship leader, acoustic guitar
- Brooke Fraser – worship leader, acoustic guitar
- Jonathon Douglass – worship leader
- Jad Gillies – worship leader, electric guitar, acoustic guitar
- Annie Garratt – worship leader
- Holly Dawson– worship leader
- Anneka Kelly – backing vocals
- Mia Fieldes – backing vocals
- Sam Knock – backing vocals
- Michelle Fragar – backing vocals
- Rolf Wam Fjell – drums
- Matthew Tennikoff – bass guitar, keyboards
- Michael Guy Chislett – electric guitar
- Marcus Beaumont – electric guitar
- Nathan Taylor – electric guitar
- Peter James – keyboards
- Kevin Lee – keyboards
- Deve George – keyboards
