= Hillsong United =

Australian worship band

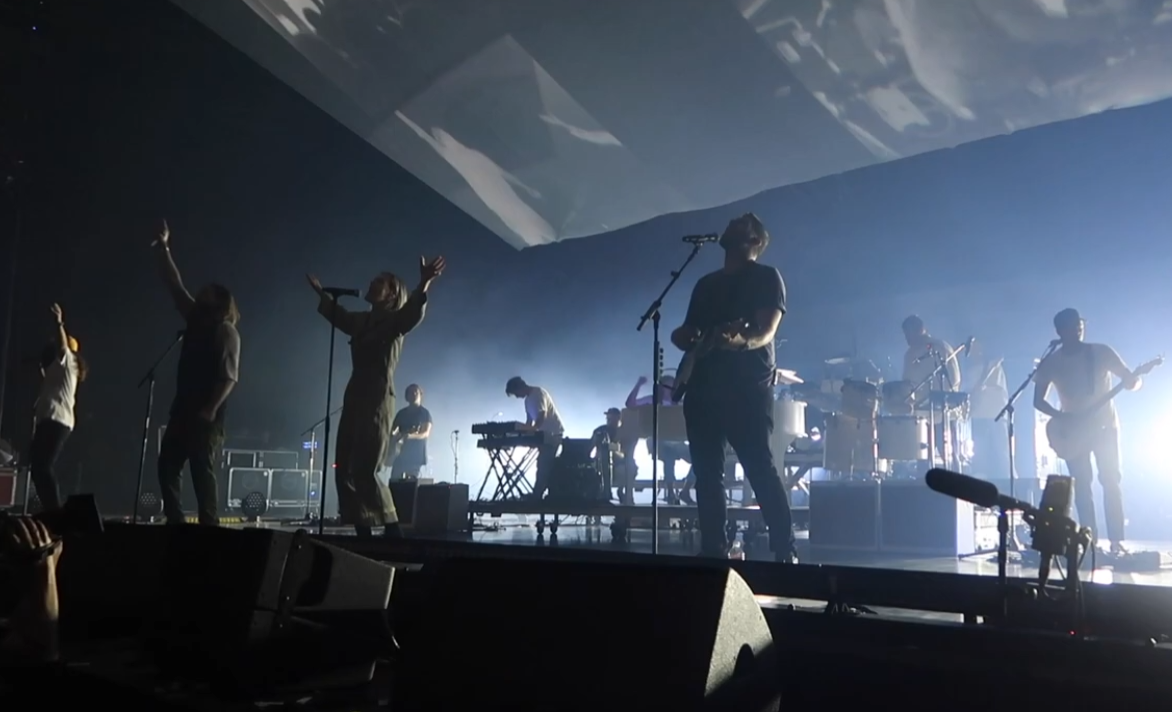
- Hillsong United in 2019

Background information
- Also known as: UNITED
- Origin: Sydney, Australia
- Genres: Contemporary worship music; CCM; Christian rock
- Years active: 1998–2022
- Label: Hillsong Music
- Website: hillsong.com/music/united

Hillsong United (stylised as Hillsong UNITED or UNITED) was a contemporary worship collective originating from Hillsong Church. Since forming in 1998 out of the church's youth ministry, the group has released fifteen live albums and six studio albums.

Band members are involved in Hillsong Church services and also play for the church. The band has toured in a number of countries, leading worship in various places and has an international influence.

== History ==
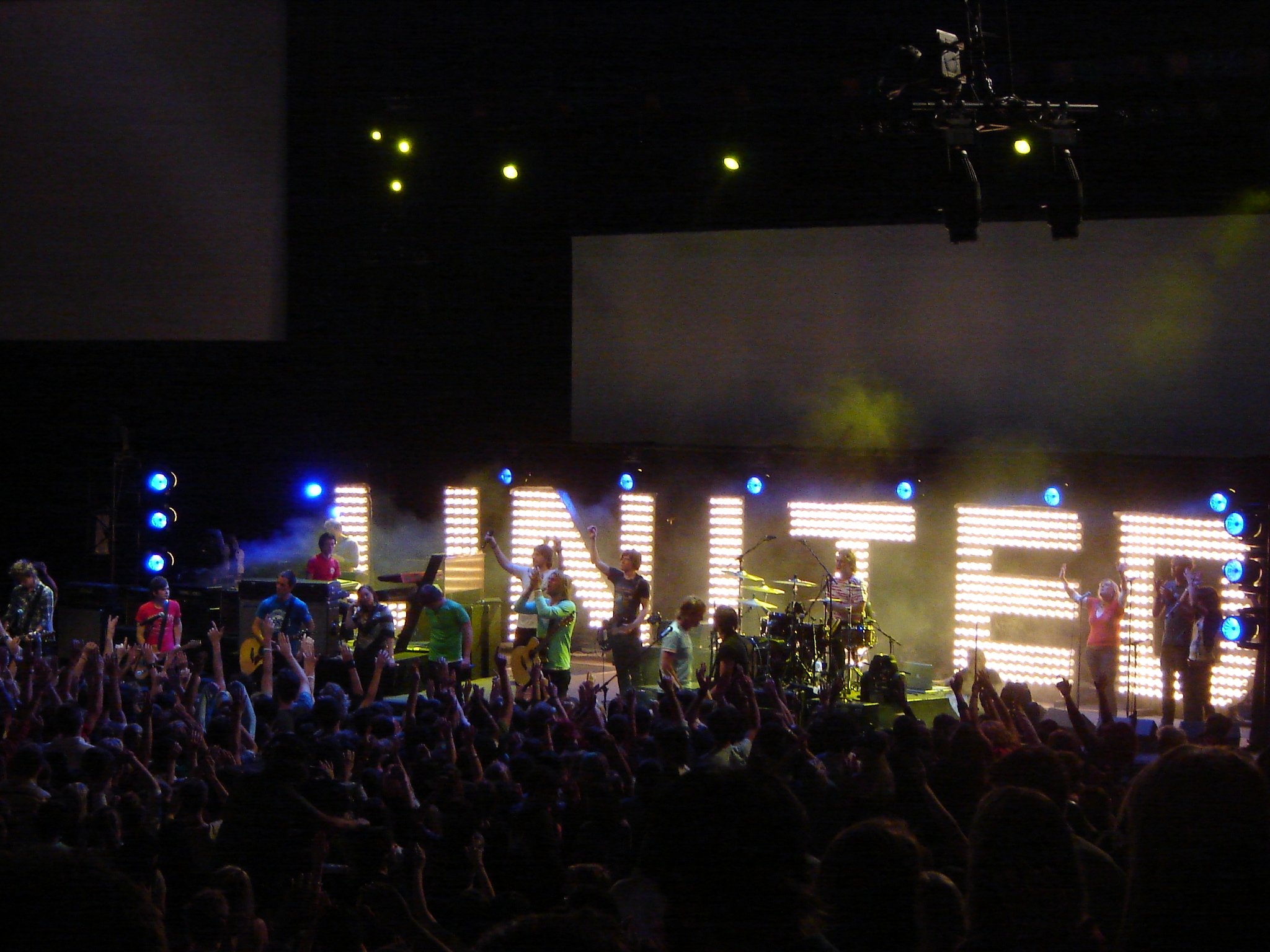
HIllsong United in 2005

Originally called United Live, Hillsong United was formed in 1998, originating from the youth ministry of Hillsong Church called Powerhouse Youth. The band released their first live album Everyday after Darlene Zschech—the worship pastor of the church—suggested for them to record their own CDs. Mentored by Zschech in their early years, the band was first led by Reuben Morgan. Joel Houston and Marty Sampson took over the leadership in 2002. The official UNITED logo was designed by drummer Luke Munns in 2002 for To the Ends of the Earth.

After several live albums in the 2000s, Hillsong United released their first full studio album All of the Above in 2007.

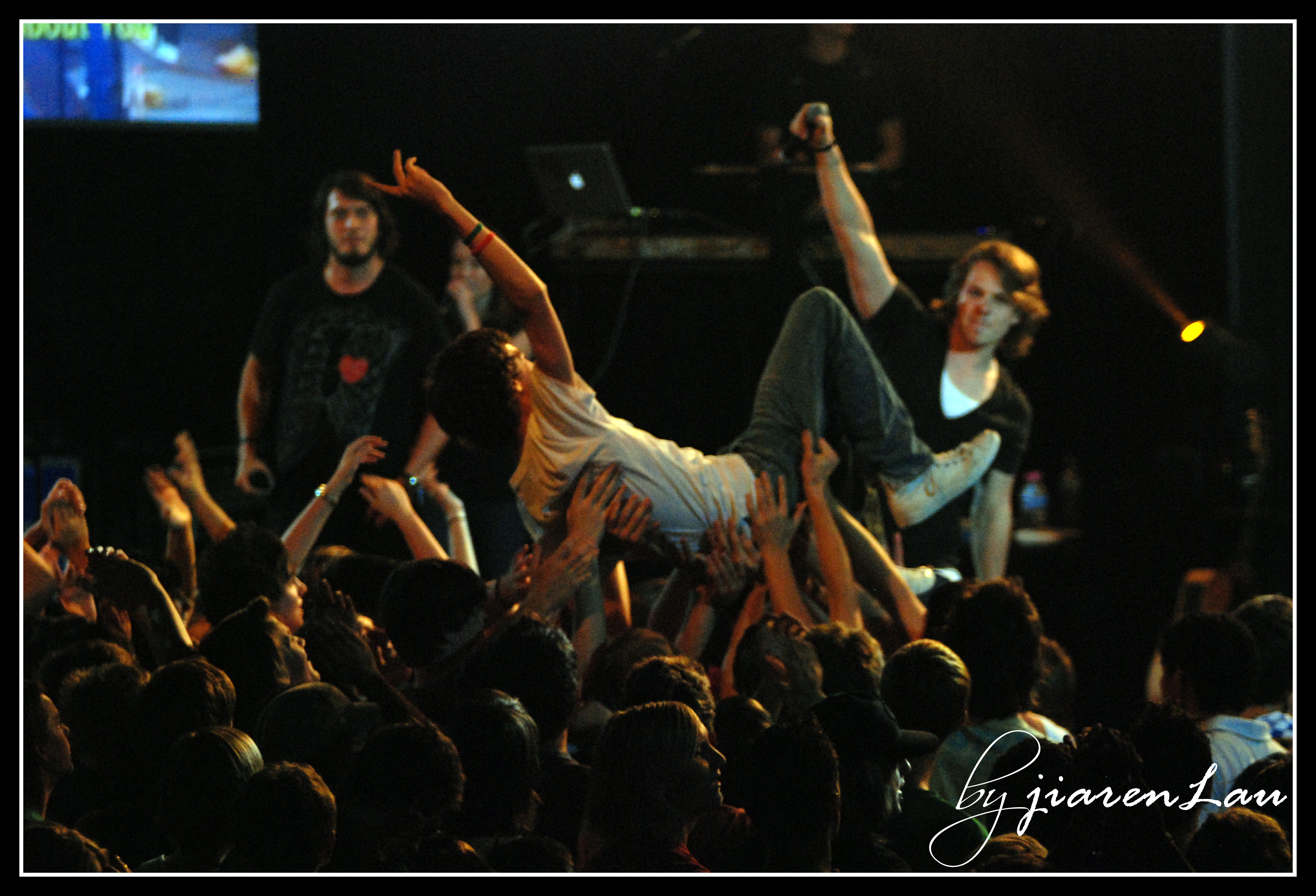
Hillsong United in 2008

The band released their third studio album Zion in February 2013. The album debuted at No. 5 on the Billboard 200 and topped Billboard's Top Christian Albums. The album features "Oceans (Where Feet May Fail)", which has been certified 4× Platinum in the U.S. and was awarded Top Christian Song at the 2016 Billboard Music Awards.

In 2014, Hillsong United was nominated for and won five GMA Dove Awards, including Song of the Year for "Oceans (Where Feet May Fail)". The band also received its first ever American Music Awards nomination that year, for Favorite Artist – Contemporary Inspirational, but did not win. 2015 saw the band nominated for a second consecutive year in the same category at the 43rd edition of the show. It was also nominated for the first time at that year's Billboard Music Awards in the Top Christian Artist and Top Christian Song categories; it won the former. The band was nominated again at the 2016 Billboard Music Awards, and garnered four nods across all three Christian categories, winning its second consecutive Top Christian Artist award, and its first for Top Christian Song with "Oceans (Where Feet May Fail)". The band won two Dove Awards, including Worship Album of the Year, for its fourth studio album Empires, at the 47th Gospel Music Awards held that October. In 2018, the band received four nominations at the 49th GMA Dove Awards including one for Artist of the Year—it won Recorded Worship Song of the Year for its single "So Will I (100 Billion X)".

== Final lineup ==
- Joel Houston – worship leader, guitars, keyboards, percussion, bass
- Jonathon "JD" Douglass – worship leader, percussion, keyboards
- Jad Gillies – worship leader, guitars, percussion
- Matt Crocker – worship leader, guitars, percussion
- Michael Guy Chislett – guitars, keyboards, music director, producer
- Dylan Thomas – guitars, keyboards, music director
- Benjamin "Ben" Tennikoff – keyboard, programming, sampler
- Jihea Oh – bass guitar
- Dan McMurray – drums, percussion
- Jeriana Baptiste – worship leader
- Tahisha Hunt – worship leader

Former members of the band are:

- Reuben Morgan – worship leader, guitars
- Marty Sampson – worship leader, guitars
- Brooke Fraser – worship leader, guitars
- Taya Gaukrodger – worship leader
- Benjamin William Hastings – worship leader, guitars, keyboards
- Raymond Badham – guitars
- Marcus Beaumont – guitars
- Nigel Hendroff – guitars
- Nathan Taylor – guitars
- Timon Klein – guitars
- Matt Tennikoff – bass guitar
- Adam Crosariol – bass guitar
- Simon Kobler – drums, percussion
- Brandon Gillies – drums, percussion
- Gabriel Kelly – drums, percussion
- Rolf Wam Fjell – drums, percussion
- Luke Munns – drums, percussion
- David George – piano, keyboards, synthesizer
- Peter James – piano, keyboards, synthesizer
- Kevin Lee – piano, keyboards, synthesizer
- Peter King – piano, keyboards, synthesizer
- Dave Ware – worship leader
- Tulele Faletolu – worship leader
- Annie Garratt – worship leader
- Sam Knock – worship leader
- Holly Dawson – worship leader
- Jill McCloghry – guitar, vocals
- Michelle Fragar – worship leader

Timeline

== Discography ==
=== Studio albums ===
List of albums, with selected chart positions
Title	Album details	Peak chart positions								Certifications
Title	Album details	AUS	CAN	NLD	NOR	NZ	SCT	UK	US	Certifications
All of the Above	Released: 17 March 2007 (AUS); Label: Hillsong Music Australia	6	—	—	—	13	—	—	60	
Aftermath	Released: 15 February 2011; Label: Hillsong Music Australia, EMI	4	—	—	—	12	—	—	17	
Zion	Released: 22 February 2013 (AUS); Label: Hillsong Music Australia, EMI	1	16	39	5	8	60	55	5	ARIA: Gold; RIAA: Gold
Empires	Released: 26 May 2015 (AUS); Label: Hillsong Music Australia, Capitol CMG	1	4	12	7	7	39	34	5	
Wonder	Released: 9 June 2017; Label: Hillsong Music Australia, Capitol CMG	4	39	91	37	19	—	—	21	
Are We There Yet?	Released: 29 April 2022; Label: Hillsong Music Australia, Capitol CMG	—	—	—	—	—	—	— (Note: Are We There Yet? did not enter the Official Charts Company UK Albums chart, but peaked at No. 79 on the Official Charts Company UK Album Downloads chart)	—	
"—" denotes a recording that did not chart or was not released in that territory

=== Live albums ===
List of albums, with selected chart positions
Title	Album details	Peak chart positions				
Title	Album details	AUS	NZ	NLD	US	US Christ.
Everyday	Released: November 1999; Label: Hillsong Music Australia	—	—	—	—	—
Best Friend	Released: 20 November 2000; Label: Hillsong Music Australia	—	—	—	—	—
King of Majesty	Released: 15 October 2001; Label: Hillsong Music Australia	—	—	—	—	—
To the Ends of the Earth	Released: 21 November 2002; Label: Hillsong Music Australia	—	—	—	—	—
More Than Life	Released: 23 March 2004; Label: Hillsong Music Australia	—	—	—	—	—
Look to You	Released: 28 February 2005; Label: Hillsong Music Australia	30	—	—	—	33
United We Stand	Released: 11 March 2006; Label: Hillsong Music Australia	28	23	—	162	11
Unidos Permanecemos	Released: 2007; Label: Hillsong Music Australia	—	—	—	—	—
The I Heart Revolution: With Hearts as One	Released: 8 March 2008; Label: Hillsong Music Australia	8	22	—	117	5
[a_CROSS // the_EARTH]	Released: 9 May 2009 (AUS); Label: Hillsong Music Australia	22	21	—	21	1
Live in Miami: Welcome to the Aftermath	Released: 14 February 2012; Label: Hillsong Music Australia/Capitol CMG	22	—	—	71	1
Zion Acoustic Sessions	Released: 29 October 2013; Label: Hillsong Music Australia/Capitol CMG	—	—	—	88	4
Of Dirt and Grace: Live from the Land	Released: 15 July 2016 (AUS); Label: Hillsong Music Australia/Capitol CMG	8	—	80	40	2
People	Released: 26 April 2019; Label: Hillsong Music Australia/Capitol CMG; Formats: CD, LP, digital download	6	22	—	2	1
The People Tour: Live from Madison Square Garden	Released: 29 January 2021; Label: Hillsong Music Australia/Capitol CMG; Formats: CD, digital download	—	—	—	—	11
"—" denotes a recording that did not chart or was not released in that territory

=== Soundtrack albums ===
List of albums, with selected chart positions
Title	Album details	Peak chart positions	
Title	Album details	AUS	US Christ.
Hillsong: Let Hope Rise – Original Motion Picture Soundtrack	Released: 12 August 2016 (AUS); Label: Hillsong Music Australia, Capitol	94	6

=== Others ===
List of other releases (EPs, remix albums), with selected chart positions
Title	Album details	Peak chart positions			
Title	Album details	AUS	US	US Christ.	US Dance
One (EP)	Released: 1998	—	—	—	—
In a Valley by the Sea (EP)	Released: 2 October 2007	—	—	—	—
Oceans (EP)	Released: 10 September 2013; Label: Hillsong Music Australia	—	—	—	—
The White Album [remix project]	Released: 4 March 2014; Label: Hillsong Music Australia, Sparrow	9	48	4	1
So Will I (100 Billion X) [EP]	Released: 23 March 2018; Label: Hillsong Music Australia	—	—	—	—
People - En Español (EP)	Released: 8 November 2019; Label: Hillsong Music Australia	—	—	—	—
"—" denotes a recording that did not chart or was not released in that territory

=== Singles ===
List of albums, with selected chart positions
Title	Year	Peak chart positions				Certifications	Album
Title	Year	US	US Christ.	US Christ. Air.	US Christ. Digital	Certifications	Album
"Bones"	2011	—	35		35		Aftermath
"Like an Avalanche"	2011	—	40		40		Aftermath
"Search My Heart"	2011	—	20		17		Aftermath
"Lead Me to the Cross"	2011	—	—		48	RIAA: Gold; RMNZ: Gold	All of the Above
"Scandal of Grace"	2013	—	25		21		Zion
"From the Inside Out"	2013	—	—		—		United We Stand
"Oceans (Where Feet May Fail)"	2013	83	1		1	RIAA: 4× Platinum; BPI: Silver; MC: 2× Platinum; RMNZ: 2× Platinum	Zion
"Relentless"	2013	—	27	—	45		Zion
"Love Is War"	2014	—	38	—	50		Zion
"Touch the Sky"	2015	—	3	5	1	RIAA: Platinum; RMNZ: Gold	Empires
"Say the Word"	2015	—	24	29	—		Empires
"Even When It Hurts (Praise Song)"	2017	—	37	—	—		Non-album single
"Wonder"	2017	—	11	11	6		Wonder
"So Will I (100 Billion X)"	2018	—	3	6	2	RIAA: Platinum; RMNZ: Platinum	Wonder
"Not Today"	2018	—	40	10	—		Wonder
"Good Grace"	2018	—	11	16	4		People
"Whole Heart (Hold Me Now)"	2019	—	14	—	3		People
"As You Find Me"	2019	—	22	—	7		People
"Another in the Fire"	2019	—	17	14	6	RIAA: Gold	People
"Know You Will"	2021	—	23	21	16		Are We There Yet?
"Sure Thing"	2021	—	46	—	—		Are We There Yet?
"On Repeat"	2022	—	34	—	—		Are We There Yet?

=== Other charted and certified songs ===
List of albums, with selected chart positions
Title	Year	Peak chart positions		Certifications	Album
Title	Year	JPN	US Christ.	Certifications	Album
"Hosanna"	2007	—	—	RIAA: Gold	All of the Above
"Stay Young"	2013	53	—		Non-album single
"Prince of Peace"	2015	—	26		Empires
"Heart Like Heaven"	2015	—	26		Empires
"Here Now (Madness)"	2015	—	31		Empires
"Captain"	2015	—	38		Empires
"Rule"	2015	—	40		Empires
"Empires"	2015	—	41		Empires
"When I Lost My Heart to You (Hallelujah)"	2015	—	43		Empires
"Street Called Mercy"	2015	—	45		Empires
"Closer Than You Know"	2015	—	47		Empires
"Heaven Knows"	2017	—	29		The Shack Soundtrack
"Shadow Step"	2017	—	22		Wonder
"Splinters and Stones"	2017	—	29		Wonder
"Shape of Your Heart"	2017	—	35		Wonder
"Glimmer In The Dust"	2017	—	40		Wonder
"Future Marches In"	2017	—	43		Wonder
"Greatest of These"	2017	—	49		Wonder
"Highlands (Song of Ascent)"	2019	—	23		People
"Ready or Not"	2019	—	27		People
"Clean"	2019	—	28		People
"Might Sound Wild"	2019	—	31		People
"Holy Ground"	2019	—	32		People
"Here's To The One"	2019	—	33		People
"Echoes (Til We See The Other Side)"	2019	—	36		People
"Starts and Ends"	2019	—	45		People
"Oceans (Where Feet May Fail)" (Live)	2021	—	37		The People Tour: Live from Madison Square Garden

== Videography ==
- 2004: More Than Life (bonus DVD with album)
- 2005: Look to You (bonus DVD with album)
- 2006: United We Stand (bonus DVD with album)
- 2007: All of the Above (bonus DVD with album)
- 2008: The I Heart Revolution: With Hearts As One (Music DVD)
- 2010: The I Heart Revolution: We're All in This Together (Documentary DVD/Blu-ray)
- 2012: Live in Miami (Music DVD/Blu-ray)
- 2013: Zion Acoustic Sessions (Music DVD)
- 2016: Of Dirt and Grace: Live from the Land (Music DVD/Blu-ray)

A documentary, Hillsong: Let Hope Rise, directed by Michael John Warren, chronicles the rise of the band, was originally supposed to be released by Warner Bros. during the 2015 Easter weekend. As Alcon Entertainment and Warner Bros. were unable to close a deal, the film was pulled out from Warner Bros' schedule. In March 2015, Relativity Media obtained the distribution rights and the film shifted to a 29 May release. In April, Relativity moved the film to 30 September 2015. However, Relativity Media filed for Chapter 11 bankruptcy in July and let go of the rights to the producers. PureFlix acquired the film and it was released on 16 September 2016.

== Awards ==
As of 2020 the group has received 11 Dove Awards.

== See also ==
- Hillsong Young & Free
- Youth Alive Australia
- The I Heart Revolution: With Hearts as One
