= Zion (Hillsong United album) =

Studio album by Hillsong United
- Released: 22 February 2013
- Recorded: 2011–2012
- Genres: Contemporary worship music, contemporary Christian music
- Length: 70:14
- Labels: Hillsong, Sparrow, BMG Rights Management
- Producers: Michael Guy Chislett, Joel Houston (executive producer)

Hillsong United studio album chronology
Aftermath (2011)	Zion (2013)	Empires (2015)

Hillsong United chronology
Live In Miami (2012)	Zion (2013)	Zion Acoustic Sessions (2013)

Singles from Zion
- 1. "Scandal of Grace" Released: 5 February 2013; 2. "Oceans (Where Feet May Fail)" Released: 10 September 2013

Zion is the third studio album by Australian contemporary worship music band Hillsong United. It was released on 22 February 2013 for Australia, and was released by 26 February 2013 internationally, under Hillsong Music and Sparrow Records. Production for the album began in March 2011 in Sydney, Australia. Michael Guy Chislett and band member Joel Houston oversaw production of the album, with the latter serving as executive producer.

Two singles were released to promote the album: "Scandal of Grace" on 5 February 2013, and "Oceans (Where Feet May Fail)" on 10 September 2013.

== Background ==
Hillsong United gave an interview to CCM Magazine's Grace Cartwright Aspinwall about the album.

== Critical reception ==
Professional ratings
Review scores
Source	Rating
AllMusic	3.5/5 stars
CCM Magazine	4/5 stars
Christian Broadcasting Network	4.5/5 spins
Christian Music Zine	3.5/5 stars
Cross Rhythms	10/10 squares
Indie Vision Music	4/5 stars
Jesus Freak Hideout	4.5/5 stars 4/5 stars
Louder Than the Music	5/5 stars
New Release Today	4.5/5 stars
Worship Leader	4.5/5 stars

Zion garnered praise from the ratings and reviews of music critics. At Christian Broadcasting Network, Hannah Goodwyn rated the album four-and-a-half spins, writing that "The music, the lyrics, the movement, it all comes together in Zion." Matt Conner of CCM Magazine rated the album four stars, stating that this is yet "Another strong United release." Andrea Hunter of Worship Leader rated the album four-and-a-half stars, writing that listeners will "find songs across generations and traditions to honor God and transform hearts." At Cross Rhythms, Tony Cummings rated the album a perfect ten squares, saying that the band "have released a peach of an album". In addition, Cross Rhythms' Stephen Curry rated the album a perfect ten squares, indicating how the release contains "a variety of sounds and moments of creativity", and the band "should be applauded for their subtle but brave changes in musical direction." Ryan Barbee of Jesus Freak Hideout rated the album four-and-a-half stars, stating that he takes his hat off due "to your art." According to Scott Fryberger of Jesus Freak Hideout, who rated the album four stars, says that this is "the best album United has ever released". Jonathan Andre of Indie Vision Music rated the album four stars, writing that the release "is full of lyrically rich themes and messages against the backdrop of electronic music that presents a unique way of creating worship music". At New Release Today, Mary Burklin rated the album four-and-a-half stars, stating that "a richly textured release that manages to achieve an intimate, organic feel despite the band's massive international reach." David Jeffries of AllMusic rated the album three-and-a-half stars, writing that the release is "just a touch overstuffed." At Louder Than the Music, Jono Davies rated the album a perfect five stars, remarking how the release is "Epic, Brilliant and Original." Emily Kjonaas of Christian Music Zine rated the album three-and-a-half stars, saying that "this is a great worship album that will help you keep your focus on Christ."

== Commercial performance ==
Zion is Hillsong United's most successful album to date, with 34,100 units being sold in its first week. It sold 25% more than Aftermath, allowing it to debut at number five on the US Billboard 200. The album was also their seventh No.1 on the US Christian Albums chart. The album has sold 169,000 copies in the US as of May 2015.

The album debuted at No. 1 on the Australian Albums Chart and has since been certified gold by the Australian Recording Industry Association for sales exceeding 35,000 copies.

== Track listing ==
Standard edition
No.	Title	Writer(s)	Worship leader	Length
1.	"Relentless"	Matt Crocker, Joel Houston	Matt Crocker	5:10
2.	"Up In Arms"	Joel Houston	Joel Houston	4:28
3.	"Scandal Of Grace"	Crocker, Houston	Matt Crocker	4:06
4.	"Oceans (Where Feet May Fail)"	Crocker, Houston, Salomon Ligthelm	Taya Smith	8:56
5.	"Stay And Wait"	Houston	Joel Houston	5:13
6.	"Mercy Mercy"	Crocker, Houston	Matt Crocker	4:42
7.	"Love Is War"	Houston	Jad Gillies	7:16
8.	"Nothing Like Your Love"	Sam Knock	Jad Gillies	5:52
9.	"Zion" (Interlude)	Michael Guy Chislett, Knock, Ben Tennikoff	Jad Gillies	3:32
10.	"Heartbeats"	Chislett, Crocker, Houston, Tennikoff	Matt Crocker	3:54
11.	"A Million Suns"	Scott Ligertwood, Dean Ussher	Taya Smith; Jad Gillies	5:06
12.	"Tapestry"	Chislett, Crocker, Houston, Ligertwood, Tennikoff	Jonathan Douglass; Taya Smith	6:43
13.	"King Of Heaven"	Crocker, Ligthelm, Ryan Taubert	Matt Crocker	5:29
Total length:				1:10:15

Deluxe edition
No.	Title	Writer(s)	Worship Leader	Length
14.	"Arise"	Steven Robertson, Taubert	Joel Houston	3:15
15.	"Mountain"	Crocker, Houston	David Ware	7:11
16.	"Mercy Mercy" (Reloaded)	Matt Crocker and Joel Houston	Matt Crocker	4:11
17.	"Oceans (Where Feet May Fail)" (Reloaded)	Matt Crocker, Joel Houston and Salomon Ligthelm	Taya Smith	7:00
18.	"Stay And Wait" (Reloaded)	Joel Houston	Joel Houston	5:11
Total length:				1:36:18

iTunes Store deluxe bonus video
No.	Title	Length
19.	"Welcome Zion" (Video)	6:57
Total length:		1:43:14

== Personnel ==
Adapted from AllMusic and Zion booklet.

Hillsong United

- Matt Crocker – vocals, acoustic guitar, percussion, keyboard, synthesizer
- Adam Crosariol – bass
- Jonathon Douglass – vocals, electric piano, percussion
- Jad Gillies – vocals, electric guitar, percussion
- Joel Houston – vocals, electric guitar, keyboard, synthesizer, bass
- Peter James – piano, keyboard, synthesizer
- Timon Klein – electric guitar
- Simon Kobler – drums, percussion
- Dylan Thomas – electric guitar

Additional musicians

- Michael Guy Chislett – acoustic guitar, electric guitar, keyboard, percussion, strings arrangement, synthesizer
- Jay Cook – backing vocals
- Evie Gallardo – violin
- Joel Hingston – electric guitar
- Carli Marino – vocals
- Steven Robertson – acoustic guitar on "Arise"
- James Rudder – percussion
- Taya Smith – vocals
- Ryan Taubert – strings arrangement
- Ben Tennikoff – piano, organ, piano accordion, keyboard, synthesizer
- Matt Tennikoff – bass
- Laura Toggs – backing vocals
- David Ware – vocals on "Mountain"
- Michaeli Whitney – cello

Production

- Jay Argaet – art direction
- Jonathon Baker – engineer
- Nathan Cahyadi – art design
- Michael Guy Chislett – producer, mixing, engineer, programming
- Adam Dodson – project manager
- Sam Gibson – mixing
- Bobbie Houston – senior pastor
- Brian Houston – senior pastor
- Joel Houston – executive producer, producer
- Peter James – programming
- Matt Johnson – photography
- Simon Kobler – programming
- Stephen Marcussen – mastering
- Jim Monk – engineer
- James Rudder – mixing, engineer
- Ben Tennikoff – programming
- Ben Whincop – engineer
- Stewart Whitmore – digital editor

== Charts ==
=== Weekly charts ===
Chart (2013)	Peak position
Australian Albums (ARIA)	1
Belgian Albums (Ultratop Flanders)	152
Danish Albums (Hitlisten)	29
Dutch Albums (Album Top 100)	39
New Zealand Albums (RMNZ)	8
Norwegian Albums (VG-lista)	5
Scottish Albums (Official Charts)	60
UK Albums (Official Charts)	55
UK Christian and Gospel Albums (OCC)	1
UK Album Downloads (Official Charts)	32
UK Independent Albums (Official Charts)	10
US Billboard 200	5
US Top Christian Albums (Billboard)	1

=== Year-end charts ===
Chart (2013)	Position
US Christian Albums (Billboard)	11
Chart (2014)	Position
US Christian Albums (Billboard)	6
Chart (2015)	Position
US Christian Albums (Billboard)	21
Chart (2017)	Position
US Christian Albums (Billboard)	29
Chart (2018)	Position
US Christian Albums (Billboard)	29
Chart (2019)	Position
US Christian Albums (Billboard)	29
Chart (2020)	Position
US Christian Albums (Billboard)	22
Chart (2021)	Position
US Christian Albums (Billboard)	27
Chart (2025)	Position
US Christian Albums (Billboard)	44

=== Decade-end charts ===
Chart (2010s)	Position
US Christian Albums (Billboard)	10

== Certifications ==
Region	Certification	Certified units/sales
Australia (ARIA)	Gold	35,000^{^}
United States (RIAA)	Gold	500,000^{‡}
^{^} Shipments figures based on certification alone.^{‡} Sales+streaming figures based on certification alone.
