= Joel Houston =

Australian musician

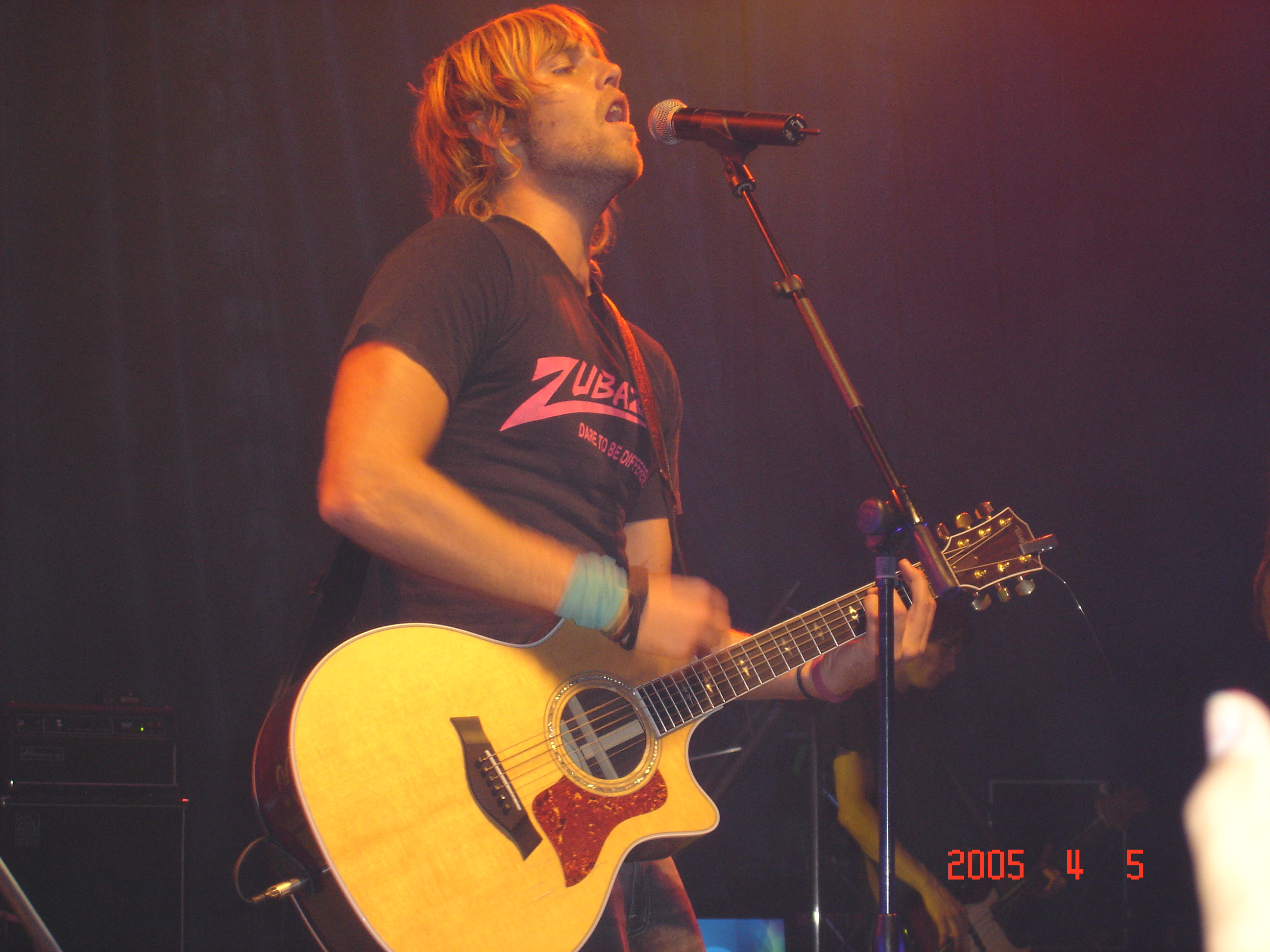

Background information
- Born: Joel Timothy Houston; 19 September 1979 (age 47); Brisbane, Queensland
- Origin: Sydney, New South Wales, Australia
- Genres: Contemporary worship music, Christian rock
- Occupations: Musician; record producer; songwriter; pastor; worship leader
- Instruments: Vocals; guitar; bass; keyboards; percussion
- Years active: 1999–present
- Labels: Hillsong, Sparrow, Capitol

Joel Timothy Houston (born 19 September 1979) is an Australian musician, songwriter and pastor.

He was co-pastor at Hillsong NYC between 2010 and 2017. He was the head of the Christian worship band Hillsong United.

In 2008, he became the creative director at Hillsong Church. He is the oldest son of the church's Founding Pastors Brian and Bobbie Houston and grandson of Frank Houston. Houston was also the bass player for the band Able, which was composed of Marty Sampson, Michael Guy Chislett and Luke Munns, which won the Channel V Leg Up competition in 2001.

== Biography ==
=== Early life ===
Joel is the oldest child of the former Hillsong Church's founding pastors Brian and Bobbie Houston and grandson of pastor Frank Houston. He has two siblings.

Houston wanted to play the piano at the age of seven. However he found an inclination to play bass and this led him to play the bass guitar for a number of Hillsong Worship albums instead.

=== Hillsong United and Hillsong ===
Houston's debut with the Hillsong United as a vocalist was in 2002, however he had been playing bass guitar with the band for several years prior to this, and contributing various songs, including the title track from the group's debut full-length live album, Everyday. As part of Hillsong United music team, Houston has helped lead worship conferences in North America, South America, Africa, Europe and Asia. He has also contributed to the main Hillsong album recordings as well, which are led by worship pastor Reuben Morgan. His music has been on Hillsong albums that have quickly risen on both the Australian and American Christian music charts. In March 2007, Hillsong United's eighth album All of the Above debuted at No. 6 on the ARIA charts. Joel Houston has been the creative director of Hillsong since 2008. Joel was co-pastor of Hillsong NYC with Carl Lentz until Lentz's employment was terminated by Brian Houston for unnamed "moral failings".

== Personal life ==
Joel married Brazilian model Esther Lima in 2012, and they had a son in 2013.
