= Elevation Worship discography =

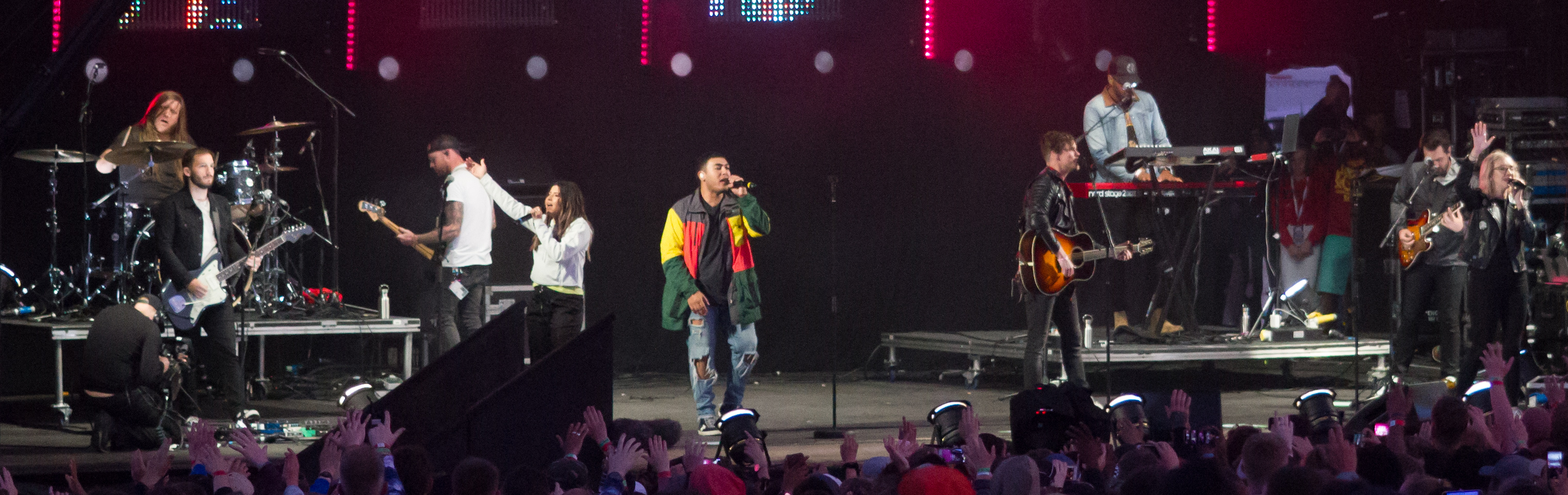
- Studio albums: 4
- EPs: 9
- Live albums: 13
- Singles: 33

American contemporary worship music collective Elevation Worship has released four studio albums, 13 live albums, nine extended plays, 33 singles, and eight promotional singles.

== Albums ==
=== Studio albums ===
Title	Details	Peak chart positions	
Title	Details	US Christ.	US Indie
The Sound	Released: 2007; Label: None; Format: CD, download, stream	—	—
We Are Alive	Released: July 10, 2008; Label: None; Format: CD, download, stream	—	—
God With Us	Released: June 25, 2009; Label: None; Format: CD, download, stream	—	—
Kingdom Come	Released: September 7, 2010; Label: None; Format: CD, download, stream	17	42
"—" denotes a recording that did not chart or was not released.

=== Live albums ===
Title	Details	Peak chart positions								Sales	Certifications
Title	Details	US	US Christ.	AUS	CAN	NZ	SWI	UK Down.	UK C&G	Sales	Certifications
For the Honor	Released: November 22, 2011; Label: Essential, Provident; Format: CD, DVD, download, stream	193	19	—	—	—	—	—	—	US: 30,000	
Nothing Is Wasted	Released: February 19, 2013; Label: Essential, Provident; Format: CD, DVD, download, stream	41	1	—	—	—	—	—	—		
Only King Forever	Released: January 14, 2014; Label: Essential, Provident; Format: CD, download, stream	23	2	—	—	—	—	—	1		
Wake Up the Wonder	Released: November 25, 2014; Label: Essential, Provident; Format: CD, DVD, download, stream	58	1	—	—	—	—	—	3	US: 16,000	
Here as in Heaven	Released: February 5, 2016; Label: Elevation Worship, Provident; Format: CD, vinyl, download, stream	15	1	27	58	32	—	63	1	US: 28,000	RIAA: Gold; RMNZ: Gold
There Is a Cloud	Release: March 17, 2017; Label: Elevation Worship, Provident; Format: CD, vinyl, download, stream	11	1	33	42	24	53	32	10	US: 34,000	
Evidence (Note: Recorded live at Elevation Ballantyne.) (As Elevation Collective)	Release: February 9, 2018; Label: Elevation Worship; Format: CD, vinyl, download, stream	—	— (Note: Evidence did not enter the Billboard Top Christian Albums chart, but peaked at number 1 on the Billboard Top Gospel Albums chart.)	—	—	—	—	—	2	US: 8,000	
Hallelujah Here Below	Release: September 28, 2018; Label: Elevation Worship; Format: CD, vinyl, download, stream	25	2	69	86	—	—	39	1	US: 18,000	
Paradoxology	Release: April 12, 2019; Label: Elevation Worship; Format: CD, download, stream	—	4	—	—	—	—	—	8		
Graves into Gardens	Release: May 1, 2020; Label: Elevation Worship; Format: CD, download, stream	34	1	38	66	—	45	10	2	US: 16,000	
Old Church Basement (with Maverick City Music)	Released: April 30, 2021; Label: Elevation Worship; Format: CD, download, stream	30	1	51	78	35	93	16	2	US: 19,000	RIAA: Gold
Lion	Released: March 4, 2022; Label: Elevation Worship; Format: CD, download, stream	80	2	—	—	—	83	21	3		
Lion: Live from the Loft	Released: August 19, 2022; Label: Elevation Worship; Format: CD, download, stream	—	24	—	—	—	—	—	—		
Can You Imagine?	Released: May 19, 2023; Label: Elevation Worship; Format: CD, download, stream	197	1	—	—	—	—	66	5	US: 8,000	RMNZ: Gold
When Wind Meets Fire	Released: July 12, 2024; Label: Elevation Worship; Format: CD, download, stream	193	1	—	—	—	—	49	3	US: 8,000	
So Be It	Released: February 20, 2026; Label: Elevation Worship; Format: CD, LP, download, stream	125	1	—	—	—	—	36	2		
"—" denotes a recording that did not chart or was not released.

=== Instrumental albums ===
Title	Details
Promise and Presence	Released: August 21, 2026; Label: Elevation Worship; Format: Digital download, streaming

=== Other albums ===
Title	Details	Peak chart positions	
Title	Details	US Christ.	UK C&G
Lo Harás Otra Vez	Release: August 18, 2017; Label: Elevation Worship; Format: CD, download, stream	25	—
Acoustic Sessions	Release: October 20, 2017; Label: Elevation Worship; Format: CD, download, stream	8	8
Aleluya (En La Tierra)	Release: July 19, 2019; Label: Elevation Worship; Format: CD, download, stream	—	—
Tumbas a Jardines	Release: July 10, 2020; Label: Elevation Worship; Format: CD, download, stream	—	—
Graves Into Gardens: Morning & Evening	Release: January 8, 2021; Label: Elevation Worship; Format: CD, download, stream	—	—
León	Release: October 7, 2022; Label: Elevation Worship; Format: CD, download, stream	—	—

=== Extended plays ===
Title	Details	Peak chart positions	
Title	Details	US	US Christ.
Kingdom Come Remix EP	Release: October 26, 2010; Label: Elevation Worship; Format: CD, download, stream	—	—
Nothing Is Wasted EP	Release: December 14, 2012; Label: Essential Records; Format: CD, download, stream	—	—
Raised to Life	Release: March 28, 2014; Label: Provident Label Group; Format: CD, download, stream	—	—
Speak Revival	Release: September 9, 2016; Label: Provident Label Group; Format: CD, download, stream	—	—
O Come to the Altar	Release: October 6, 2017; Label: Elevation Church; Format: CD, download, stream	—	—
Do It Again	Release: February 23, 2018; Label: Elevation Worship Records; Format: CD, download, stream	—	—
Resurrecting	Release: September 21, 2018; Label: Elevation Worship Records; Format: CD, download, stream	—	—
At Midnight	Release: January 10, 2020; Label: Elevation Worship Records; Format: CD, download, stream	149	2
A La Medianoche	Release: February 7, 2020; Label: Elevation Worship Records; Format: CD, download, stream	—	—
"—" denotes a recording that did not chart or was not released.

== Singles ==
=== As a lead artist ===
Title	Year	Peak chart positions									Certifications	Album
Title	Year	US	US Christ.	US Christ. Air	US Christ. Digital	US Gospel	US Gospel Air	US Gospel Digital	NZ Hot	SA	Certifications	Album
"Kingdom Come"	2010	—	—	—	—	—	—	—	—	—		Kingdom Come
"Angels We Have Heard on High"	2011	—	—	—	—	—	—	—	—	—		Non-album single
"Unstoppable God"	2015	—	39	—	29	—	—	—	—	—	RIAA: Gold	Wake Up the Wonder
"O Come to the Altar"	2017	—	2	2	2	—	—	—	—	—	RIAA: 3× Platinum; RMNZ: Platinum	Here as in Heaven
"Do It Again"	2018	—	5	3	9	—	—	—	—	—	RIAA: 2× Platinum; RMNZ: Gold	There Is a Cloud
"Won't Stop Now"	2018	—	24	—	13	—	—	—	—	—		Hallelujah Here Below
"Here Again"	2018	—	20	—	10	—	—	—	—	—	RIAA: Gold	Hallelujah Here Below
"Echo" (featuring Tauren Wells)	2018	—	18	11	22	—	—	—	—	—	RIAA: Gold	Hallelujah Here Below
"Hallelujah Here Below"	2018	—	41	—	16	—	—	—	—	—		Hallelujah Here Below
"Here Comes Heaven"	2018	—	36	27	—	—	—	—	—	—		Hallelujah Here Below
"Resurrecting"	2018	—	3	4	5	—	—	—	—	—	RIAA: Platinum	Here as in Heaven
"Encuéntrame Otra Vez" (in Spanish)	2019	—	—	—	—	—	—	—	—	—		Aleluya (En La Tierra)
"Eco" (in Spanish)	2019	—	—	—	—	—	—	—	—	—		Aleluya (En La Tierra)
"With You"	2019	—	22	—	4	—	—	—	—	—		Paradoxology
"See a Victory"	2019	—	5	6	6	—	—	—	—	—	RIAA: Platinum; RMNZ: Gold	At Midnight
"Never Lost"	2019	—	36	—	17	—	—	—	—	—		Non-album single
"The Blessing" (with Kari Jobe and Cody Carnes)	2020	— (Note: "The Blessing" did not enter the Billboard Hot 100, but peaked at number 15 on the Bubbling Under Hot 100 chart.)	2	7	1	—	—	—	19	—	RIAA: 2× Platinum; RMNZ: Platinum	Graves into Gardens
"Graves into Gardens" (featuring Brandon Lake)	2020	— (Note: "Graves into Gardens" did not enter the Billboard Hot 100, but peaked at number 2 on the Bubbling Under Hot 100 chart.)	1	1	1	—	—	—	—	—	RIAA: 2× Platinum; RMNZ: Gold	Graves into Gardens
"Rattle!"	2021	— (Note: "Rattle!" did not enter the Billboard Hot 100, but peaked at number 25 on the Bubbling Under Hot 100 chart.)	4	1	1	—	—	—	—	—	RIAA: Gold	Graves into Gardens
"Might Get Loud" (featuring Chris Brown, Brandon Lake and Tiffany Hudson)	2021	—	20	—	4	—	—	—	—	—		Lion
"Jireh" (with Maverick City Music featuring Chandler Moore and Naomi Raine)	2022	— (Note: "Jireh" did not enter the Billboard Hot 100, but peaked at number 30 on the Digital Song Sales chart.)	8	5	1	1	1	1	30	28	RIAA: 3× Platinum; RMNZ: Gold	Old Church Basement
"Same God" (featuring Jonsal Barrientes)	2022	— (Note: "Same God" did not enter the Billboard Hot 100, but peaked at number 47 on the Digital Song Sales chart.)	1	1	1	—	—	—	—	—	RIAA: Platinum	Lion
"More Than Able" (featuring Chandler Moore and Tiffany Hudson)	2023	— (Note: "More Than Able" did not enter the Billboard Hot 100, but peaked at number 44 on the Digital Song Sales chart.)	7	41	5	—	—	—	—	—	RIAA: Gold	Can You Imagine?
"Trust in God" (featuring Chris Brown)	2023	—	2	6	1	—	—	—	—	—	RIAA: 2× Platinum; RMNZ: Gold	Can You Imagine?
"Another One" (featuring Chris Brown)	2024	—	14	—	6	—	—	—	—	—		When Wind Meets Fire
"What a Miracle" (featuring Leeland and Chris Brown)	2024	—	26	—	—	—	—	—	—	—		When Wind Meets Fire
"Praise" (featuring Brandon Lake, Chris Brown, and Chandler Moore)	2024	— (Note: "Praise" did not enter the Billboard Hot 100, but peaked at number 5 on the Bubbling Under Hot 100 chart.)	1	1	1	—	—	—	—	—	RIAA: 2× Platinum; RMNZ: Platinum	Can You Imagine?
"All of a Sudden" (featuring Tiffany Hudson and Chris Brown)	2024	—	22	—	—	—	—	—	—	—		When Wind Meets Fire
"God Is Not Against Me" (featuring Tiffany Hudson and Jonsal Barrientes)	2024	—	24	19	—	—	—	—	—	—		When Wind Meets Fire
"Sure Been Good" (featuring Tiffany Hudson)	2024	—	15	—	13	—	—	—	—	—		Non-album single
"Yahweah We <3 You" (featuring TJoe L Barnes)	2024	—	21	—	—	—	—	—	—	—		When Wind Meets Fire
"New Thing Coming" (featuring Tiffany Hudson and Steven Furtick)	2024	—	28	—	—	—	—	—	—	—		When Wind Meets Fire
"I Know a Name" (with Brandon Lake)	2025	—	5	2	3	—	—	—	—	—	RIAA: Gold	So Be It
"Jesus Be the Name" (with Tiffany Hudson)	2025	—	10	35	—	—	—	—	—	—	RIAA: Gold	So Be It
"God I'm Just Grateful" (with Chandler Moore)	2025	87	1	38	1	3	—	—	33	—	RIAA: Platinum	So Be It
"—" denotes a recording that did not chart or was not released.

=== As a featured artist ===
Title	Year	Peak chart positions			Album
Title	Year	US Christ.	US Christ. Air	US Christ. Digital	Album
"Only King Forever (Joaquin Bynum Mix)" (The Sound with J. Monty and Elevation Worship)	2014	—	—	—	Non-album singles
"Impresionante" (Miel San Marcos featuring Elevation Worship)	2020	—	—	—	Non-album singles
"Nobody (Live)" (Casting Crowns featuring Elevation Worship)	2020	—	—	—	Only Jesus (deluxe)
"Vida aos Sepulcros" (Gabriela Rocha featuring Elevation Worship)	2020	—	—	—	Non-album single
"So So Good" (with Phil Wickham and Brandon Lake)	2025	8	31	4	Song of the Saints

== Promotional singles ==
Title	Year	Peak chart positions							Certifications	Album
Title	Year	US Digital	US Christ.	US Christ. Air	US Christ. Digital	US Gospel	US Gospel Digital	NZ Hot	Certifications	Album
"There Is a Cloud"	2017	—	25	—	3	—	—	—		There Is a Cloud
"My Testimony"	2020	—	24	49	9	—	—	—		Graves into Gardens
"Talking to Jesus" (with Maverick City Music featuring Brandon Lake)	2021	34	9	—	1	1	1	33	RIAA: Gold	Old Church Basement
"Wait on You" (with Maverick City Music featuring Dante Bowe and Chandler Moore)	2021	39	9	37	1	1	1	34	RIAA: Platinum	Old Church Basement
"What I See" (featuring Chris Brown)	2022	—	28	—	22	—	—	—		Lion
"This Is the Kingdom" (featuring Pat Barrett)	2022	—	27	—	—	—	—	—		Lion
"So Be It" (with Tiffany Hudson and Chris Brown)	2026	—	12	30	4	—	—	13		So Be It
"Alleluia"	2026	—	13	6	13	—	—	29		So Be It
"—" denotes a recording that did not chart.

== Other charted and certified songs ==
Title	Year	Peak chart positions					Certifications	Album
Title	Year	US Christ.	US Christ. Digital	US Gospel	US Gospel Digital	NZ Hot	Certifications	Album
"In Your Presence"	2013	—	44	—	—	—		Nothing Is Wasted
"Only King Forever"	2014	50	—	—	—	—		Only King Forever
"Raised to Life"	2014	35	27	—	—	—		Raised to Life EP
"Jesus I Come"	2014	36	26	—	—	—		Wake Up the Wonder
"Here as in Heaven"	2016	17	8	—	—	—	RIAA: Platinum; RMNZ: Gold	Here as in Heaven
"Fullness"	2016	24	5	—	—	—		Speak Revival EP
"Do It Again (EP Studio Version)"	2016	—	6	—	—	—		Speak Revival EP
"Overcome"	2017	37	—	—	—	—		There Is a Cloud
"Yours (Glory and Praise)"	2017	33	—	—	—	—		There Is a Cloud
"Uncontainable Love"	2017	48	—	—	—	—		There Is a Cloud
"Here in the Presence"	2017	46	—	—	—	—		There Is a Cloud
"Worthy"	2018	—	—	—	—	—	RIAA: Gold	Hallelujah Here Below
"Hallelujah Here Below" (featuring Steffany Gretzinger)	2019	24	16	—	—	—		Paradoxology
"Paradoxology"	2019	33	—	—	—	—		Paradoxology
"Echo"	2019	32	—	—	—	—		Paradoxology
"Mighty God (Another Hallelujah)" (Paradoxology)	2019	46	—	—	—	—		Paradoxology
"Gone"	2019	23	—	—	—	—		At Midnight
"It Is So"	2019	27	—	—	—	—		At Midnight
"Love Won't Give Up"	2019	30	—	—	—	—		At Midnight
"Available"	2020	29	21	—	—	—		Graves into Gardens
"What Would You Do" (featuring Isaiah Templeton)	2020	33	25	—	—	—		Graves into Gardens
"There is a King"	2020	34	24	—	—	—		Graves into Gardens
"No One Beside"	2020	38	—	—	—	—		Graves into Gardens
"Have My Heart (Vamp)"	2020	41	—	—	—	—		Graves into Gardens
"Authority"	2020	43	—	—	—	—		Graves into Gardens
"Never Lost" (featuring Tauren Wells)	2020	31	17	—	—	—		Graves into Gardens
"Old Church Basement" (with Maverick City Music featuring Dante Bowe)	2021	15	7	4	3	37		Old Church Basement
"Million Little Miracles" (with Maverick City Music featuring Joe L. Barnes)	2021	23	24	7	5	—	RIAA: Gold	Old Church Basement
"Shall Not Want" (with Maverick City Music featuring Chandler Moore)	2021	24	19	8	5	—		Old Church Basement
"Come Again" (with Maverick City Music featuring Brandon Lake and Chandler Moore)	2021	29	—	11	—	—		Old Church Basement
"Used to This" (with Maverick City Music featuring Naomi Raine and Brandon Lake)	2021	27	—	10	10	—		Old Church Basement
"Names" (with Maverick City Music featuring Tiffany Hudson)	2021	31	—	15	12	—		Old Church Basement
"Mercy" (with Maverick City Music featuring Chris Brown)	2021	18	4	5	1	—		Old Church Basement
"Before and After" (with Maverick City Music featuring Amanda Lindsey Cook)	2021	34	—	17	14	—		Old Church Basement
"Build Your Church" (with Maverick City Music featuring Naomi Raine and Chris Brown)	2021	25	18	9	—	—		Old Church Basement
"Bye Bye Babylon" (featuring Valley Boys)	2022	42	—	—	—	—		Lion
"Lion" (featuring Chris Brown and Brandon Lake)	2022	16	2	—	—	36	RIAA: Platinum	Lion
"Dancing" (featuring Joe L Barnes and Tiffany Hudson)	2022	38	—	—	—	—		Lion
"Water Is Wild" (featuring Chris Brown and Brandon Lake)	2022	44	—	—	—	—		Lion
"Forever YHWH" (featuring Tiffany Hudson)	2022	49	—	—	—	—		Lion
"Jehovah" (featuring Chris Brown)	2023	19	—	—	—	—		Can You Imagine?
"No Body" (featuring Jonsal Barrientes)	2023	28	—	—	—	—		Can You Imagine?
"Make a Way" (featuring Chandler Moore and Brandon Lake)	2023	25	—	—	—	—		Can You Imagine?
"Been So Good" (featuring Tiffany Hudson)	2023	34	—	—	—	—		Can You Imagine?
"Runnin" (featuring Brandon Lake)	2023	30	—	—	—	—		Can You Imagine?
"Always On Time" (featuring Bella Cordero)	2025	39	—	—	—	—		When Wind Meets Fire
"Call God" (featuring Chris Brown and Chandler Moore)	2026	29	—	—	—	—		So Be It
"Keep On" (featuring Davide Mutendji, Tori Elliot, and Isaiah Templeton)	2026	33	—	—	—	—		So Be It
"Your Name is God" (featuring Leeland Mooring)	2026	38	—	—	—	—		So Be It
"Thank You" (featuring Tiffany Hudson and Jonsal Barrientes)	2026	31	—	—	—	—		So Be It
"I Got Saved" (featuring Chris Brown)	2026	16	—	—	—	—		So Be It
"—" denotes a recording that did not chart or was not released.
