= List of best-selling Christian songs and albums in the United States =

This page shows the best-selling Christian songs and albums in the United States. It includes artists from all over the world, but only includes sales in the United States of America. This list may be incomplete, as the qualifications of a Christian album are disputed.

== Best-selling Christian songs by RIAA certification ==
This is an incomplete list of the best-selling Christian songs in the United States based on shipment certification by the RIAA.

No.	Year	Artist(s)	Title	Album	Label(s)	Certification Award
1	2017	NF	"Let You Down"	Perception	Capitol, Caroline, NF Real Music	8× Platinum
2	2018	Lauren Daigle	"You Say"	Look Up Child	Centricity	6× Platinum
2	2010	Skillet	"Monster"	Awake	Lava/Atlantic, Ardent	6× Platinum
4	2001	MercyMe	"I Can Only Imagine"	Almost There	INO/Curb	5× Platinum
5	2013	Hillsong United	"Oceans (Where Feet May Fail)"	Zion	Independent, Capitol CMG	4× Platinum
6	2005	Carrie Underwood	"Jesus, Take the Wheel"	Some Hearts	Arista Nashville, J	3× Platinum
6	2004	Kanye West	"Jesus Walks"	The College Dropout	Roc-A-Fella, Def Jam	3× Platinum
6	2017	MercyMe	"Even If"	Lifer	Fair Trade	3× Platinum
6	2019	NF	"If You Want Love"	Perception	Capitol, Caroline, NF Real Music	3× Platinum
6	2009	Skillet	"Hero"	Awake	Atlantic, Ardent, Lava	3× Platinum
10	2012	Big Daddy Weave	"Redeemed"	Love Come to Life	Fervent/Curb	2× Platinum
10	2024	Brandon Lake and Jelly Roll	"Hard Fought Hallelujah"	King of Hearts	Provident, Sony	2× Platinum
10	2014	Carrie Underwood	"Something in the Water"	Greatest Hits: Decade #1	Arista Nashville	2× Platinum
10	2004	Casting Crowns	"Who Am I"	Casting Crowns	Beach Street	2× Platinum
10	2007	Chris Tomlin	"Amazing Grace (My Chains Are Gone)"	See the Morning	Sparrow/Sixsteps	2× Platinum
10	2015	Chris Tomlin	"Good Good Father"	Never Lose Sight	Sixsteps	2× Platinum
10	2017	Cory Asbury	"Reckless Love"	Reckless Love	Bethel	2× Platinum
10	2024	Elevation Worship, Brandon Lake, Chris Brown, and Chandler Moore	"Praise"	Can You Imagine?	Independent	2× Platinum
10	2017	Elevation Worship	"O Come to the Altar"	Here as in Heaven	Independent	2× Platinum
10	2017	Elevation Worship	"Do It Again"	There Is a Cloud	Independent, Provident	2× Platinum
10	2020	Elevation Worship featuring Brandon Lake	"Graves Into Gardens"	Graves into Gardens	Independent, Sony Music Nashville	2× Platinum
10	2019	For King & Country	"God Only Knows"	Burn the Ships	Word	2× Platinum
10	2016	Lauren Daigle	"Trust in You"	How Can It Be	Centricity	2× Platinum
10	2019	Lauren Daigle	"Rescue"	Look Up Child	Centricity	2× Platinum
10	2013	Matt Maher	"Lord, I Need You"	All the People Said Amen	Essential	2× Platinum
10	2012	Matt Redman	"10,000 Reasons (Bless the Lord)"	10,000 Reasons	Sparrow/Sixsteps	2× Platinum
10	2022	Maverick City Music and Elevation Worship	"Jireh"	Old Church Basement	Independent	2× Platinum
10	2011	Newsboys and Kevin Max	"God's Not Dead (Like a Lion)"	God's Not Dead	Inpop	2× Platinum
10	2019	NF	"The Search"	The Search	Caroline, NF Real Music	2× Platinum
10	2010	Skillet	"Awake and Alive"	Awake	Atlantic, Ardent, Lava	2× Platinum
10	2016	Skillet	"Feel Invincible"	Unleashed	Atlantic, Hear It Loud	2× Platinum
10	2012	Tamela Mann	"Take Me to the King"	Best Days	Tillymann Music Group	2× Platinum

== Best-selling Christian albums by RIAA certification ==
This is an incomplete list of the best-selling Christian songs in the United States based on shipment certification by the RIAA.

No.	Year	Artist(s)	Title	Label(s)	Certification Award
1	2003	Evanescence	Fallen	Wind-Up	Diamond
2	1991	Amy Grant	Heart in Motion	A&M/Myrrh	5× Platinum
3	1997	LeAnn Rimes	You Light Up My Life: Inspiration Songs	Curb	4× Platinum
4	1992	Amy Grant	Home for Christmas	A&M	3× Platinum
4	1997	Kirk Franklin	God's Property from Kirk Franklin's Nu Nation	B-Rite, Interscope	3× Platinum
4	2001	Mannheim Steamroller	Christmas Extraordinaire	American Gramaphone	3× Platinum
4	2001	MercyMe	Almost There	INO, Curb	3× Platinum
4	2001	P.O.D.	Satellite	Atlantic	3× Platinum
4	2003	Switchfoot	The Beautiful Letdown	Columbia, Sony BMG	3× Platinum
4	1996	Trans-Siberian Orchestra	Christmas Eve and Other Stories	Lava/Atlantic	3× Platinum
11	1994	Amy Grant	House of Love	A&M/Myrrh	2× Platinum
11	1997	Bob Carlisle	Butterfly Kisses (Shades of Grace)	Diadem/Jive	2× Platinum
11	2003	Casting Crowns	Casting Crowns	Beach Street	2× Platinum
11	1995	DC Talk	Jesus Freak	ForeFront	2× Platinum
11	1998	Fred Hammond	Pages of Life: Chapters I & II	Verity	2× Platinum
11	1995	Jars of Clay	Jars of Clay	Essential, Silvertone	2× Platinum
11	1998	Kirk Franklin	The Nu Nation Project	GospoCentric, Interscope	2× Platinum
11	2018	Lauren Daigle	Look Up Child	Centricity	2× Platinum
11	2000	Mary Mary	Thankful	Columbia	2× Platinum
11	2017	NF	Perception	Capitol, Caroline, NF Real Music	2× Platinum
11	2001	Michael W. Smith	Worship	Reunion	2× Platinum
11	2009	Skillet	Awake	Lava/Atlantic, Ardent	2× Platinum
11	2007	Third Day	Chronology Volume 1	Essential	2× Platinum
11	2007	Third Day	Chronology Volume 2	Essential	2× Platinum
11	1998	Various Artists	WOW 1999	Capitol CMG	2× Platinum
11	1999	Various Artists	WOW 2000	Sparrow, Capitol CMG	2× Platinum
11	2000	Various Artists	WOW Hits 2001	Sparrow, Capitol CMG	2× Platinum
11	1999	Various Artists	WOW Worship: Blue	Sparrow	2× Platinum

== See also ==
- Billboard Christian and Gospel Charts
- Christian music
- List of best-selling gospel music artists
- List of best-selling albums in the United States of the Nielsen SoundScan era
- List of best-selling albums by year in the United States
