= 2018 Billboard Music Awards =

Annual American music awards ceremony

- Date: May 20, 2018
- Location: MGM Grand Garden Arena, Las Vegas, Nevada, United States
- Hosted by: Kelly Clarkson

Highlights
- Most wins: Ed Sheeran and Kendrick Lamar (6 each)
- Most nominations: Kendrick Lamar, Bruno Mars and Ed Sheeran (15 each)

Television/radio coverage
- Network: NBC
- Runtime: 112 minutes
- Viewership: 7.90 million

The 2018 Billboard Music Awards ceremony was held at the MGM Grand Garden Arena in Las Vegas, Nevada on May 20, 2018. It was the first ceremony to be broadcast on NBC. The list of nominees were announced on April 17, 2018. The show was hosted by Kelly Clarkson and was sponsored by Xfinity, Pepsi, T-Mobile, Uber, and 23andMe.

== Performers ==
Performers	Song
Ariana Grande	"No Tears Left to Cry"
Kelly Clarkson	Medley: "My Church" by Maren Morris "Too Good at Goodbyes" by Sam Smith "Humble" by Kendrick Lamar "Thunder" by Imagine Dragons "Young Dumb & Broke" by Khalid "Finesse" by Bruno Mars and Cardi B "Shape of You" by Ed Sheeran "There's Nothing Holdin' Me Back" by Shawn Mendes "Look What You Made Me Do" by Taylor Swift
Dua Lipa	"New Rules"
Shawn Mendes	"In My Blood"
Khalid; Normani	"Love Lies"
John Legend	"A Good Night"
Christina Aguilera; Demi Lovato	"Fall in Line"
Ed Sheeran	"Galway Girl" (Broadcast from Phoenix Park in Ireland during his live Divide Tour gig there)
Jennifer Lopez; DJ Khaled; Cardi B (pre-recorded appearance)	"Dinero"
Shawn Mendes; Khalid; Marjory Stoneman; Douglas High School Choir	"Youth"
Zedd; Maren Morris; Grey	"The Middle"
Janet Jackson	"Nasty" "If" "Throb"
Macklemore; Kesha	"Good Old Days" (Broadcast from outside T-Mobile Arena)
Kelly Clarkson	"Whole Lotta Woman"
Pharrell Williams; Camila Cabello	"Sangria Wine" "Havana"
BTS	"Fake Love"
Salt-N-Pepa; En Vogue; Kelly Clarkson	"Shoop" "Let's Talk About Sex" "Push It" "Whatta Man"

== Winners and nominees ==
Winners are listed first and bold.

Top Artist	Top New Artist
Ed Sheeran; Drake; Kendrick Lamar; Bruno Mars; Taylor Swift	Khalid; 21 Savage; Camila Cabello; Cardi B; Kodak Black
Top Male Artist	Top Female Artist
Ed Sheeran; Drake; Kendrick Lamar; Bruno Mars; Post Malone	Taylor Swift; Camila Cabello; Cardi B; Halsey; Demi Lovato
Top Duo/Group	Top Billboard 200 Artist
Imagine Dragons; The Chainsmokers; Coldplay; Migos; U2	Drake; Kendrick Lamar; Ed Sheeran; Chris Stapleton; Taylor Swift
Top Billboard 200 Album	Top Hot 100 Artist
Damn – Kendrick Lamar; More Life – Drake; Stoney – Post Malone; ÷ (Divide) – Ed Sheeran; reputation – Taylor Swift	Ed Sheeran; Imagine Dragons; Kendrick Lamar; Bruno Mars; Post Malone
Top Hot 100 Song	Top Song Sales Artist
"Despacito" – Luis Fonsi and Daddy Yankee featuring Justin Bieber; "Humble." – Kendrick Lamar; "That's What I Like" – Bruno Mars; "Rockstar" – Post Malone featuring 21 Savage; "Shape of You" – Ed Sheeran	Ed Sheeran; Imagine Dragons; Kendrick Lamar; Bruno Mars; Post Malone
Top Selling Album	Top Selling Song
reputation – Taylor Swift; Damn – Kendrick Lamar; Beautiful Trauma – Pink; ÷ (Divide) – Ed Sheeran; From A Room: Volume 1 – Chris Stapleton	"Despacito" – Luis Fonsi and Daddy Yankee featuring Justin Bieber; "Body Like a Back Road" – Sam Hunt; "Believer" – Imagine Dragons; "Thunder" – Imagine Dragons; "Perfect" – Ed Sheeran
Top Radio Songs Artist	Top Radio Song
Ed Sheeran; Halsey; Imagine Dragons; Bruno Mars; Charlie Puth	"Shape of You" – Ed Sheeran; "Something Just Like This" – The Chainsmokers and Coldplay; "Believer" – Imagine Dragons; "That's What I Like" – Bruno Mars; "Attention" – Charlie Puth
Top Streaming Artist	Top Streaming Song (Audio)
Kendrick Lamar; Cardi B; Drake; Post Malone; Ed Sheeran	"Humble." – Kendrick Lamar; "Despacito" – Luis Fonsi and Daddy Yankee featuring Justin Bieber; "XO Tour Llif3" – Lil Uzi Vert; "Rockstar" – Post Malone featuring 21 Savage; "Congratulations" – Post Malone featuring Quavo
Top Streaming Song (Video)	Top Collaboration
"Despacito" – Luis Fonsi and Daddy Yankee featuring Justin Bieber; "Bodak Yellow (Money Moves)" – Cardi B; "Gucci Gang" – Lil Pump; "That's What I Like" – Bruno Mars; "Shape of You" – Ed Sheeran	Luis Fonsi and Daddy Yankee featuring Justin Bieber ("Despacito"); Camila Cabello featuring Young Thug ("Havana"); The Chainsmokers and Coldplay ("Something Just Like This"); French Montana featuring Swae Lee ("Unforgettable"); Post Malone featuring 21 Savage ("Rockstar")
Top Touring Artist	Top R&B Artist
U2; Coldplay; Guns N' Roses; Bruno Mars; Ed Sheeran	Bruno Mars; Chris Brown; Khalid; SZA; The Weeknd
Top R&B Male Artist	Top R&B Female Artist
Bruno Mars; Khalid; The Weeknd	SZA; Beyoncé; Rihanna
Top R&B Album	Top R&B Song
24K Magic – Bruno Mars; American Teen – Khalid; CTRL – SZA; Starboy – The Weeknd; 17 – XXXTentacion	"That's What I Like" – Bruno Mars; "Redbone" – Childish Gambino; "Wild Thoughts" – DJ Khaled featuring Rihanna and Bryson Tiller; "Young, Dumb & Broke" – Khalid; "Finesse" – Bruno Mars featuring Cardi B
Top R&B Tour	Top Rap Artist
Bruno Mars; Lionel Richie; The Weeknd	Kendrick Lamar; Drake; Lil Uzi Vert; Migos; Post Malone
Top Rap Male Artist	Top Rap Female Artist
Kendrick Lamar; Drake; Post Malone	Cardi B; Bhad Bhabie; Nicki Minaj
Top Rap Album	Top Rap Song
Damn – Kendrick Lamar; More Life – Drake; Luv Is Rage 2 – Lil Uzi Vert; Stoney – Post Malone; Culture – Migos	"Rockstar" - Post Malone featuring 21 Savage; "Bodak Yellow (Money Moves)" – Cardi B; "I'm the One" – DJ Khaled, Justin Bieber, Quavo, Chance the Rapper and Lil Wayne; "Unforgettable" - French Montana featuring Swae Lee; "Humble." – Kendrick Lamar
Top Rap Tour	Top Country Artist
Jay-Z; J. Cole; Kendrick Lamar	Chris Stapleton; Kane Brown; Luke Combs; Sam Hunt; Thomas Rhett
Top Country Male Artist	Top Country Female Artist
Chris Stapleton; Sam Hunt; Thomas Rhett	Maren Morris; Kelsea Ballerini; Miranda Lambert
Top Country Duo/Group Artist	Top Country Album
Florida Georgia Line; Old Dominion; Zac Brown Band	From A Room: Volume 1 – Chris Stapleton; Kane Brown – Kane Brown; This One's for You – Luke Combs; Life Changes – Thomas Rhett; Brett Young – Brett Young
Top Country Song	Top Country Tour
"Body Like a Back Road" – Sam Hunt; "What Ifs" – Kane Brown featuring Lauren Alaina; "Small Town Boy" – Dustin Lynch; "Meant to Be" – Bebe Rexha featuring Florida Georgia Line; "In Case You Didn't Know" – Brett Young	Luke Bryan; Florida Georgia Line; Tim McGraw and Faith Hill
Top Rock Artist	Top Rock Album
Imagine Dragons; Linkin Park; Portugal. The Man; Tom Petty & The Heartbreakers; Twenty One Pilots	Evolve – Imagine Dragons; One More Light – Linkin Park; Death of a Bachelor – Panic! at the Disco; Woodstock – Portugal. The Man; Songs of Experience – U2
Top Rock Song	Top Rock Tour
"Believer" – Imagine Dragons; "Thunder" – Imagine Dragons; "Heavy" – Linkin Park featuring Kiiara; "Feel It Still" – Portugal. The Man; "Wish I Knew You" – The Revivalists	U2; Coldplay; Guns N' Roses
Top Latin Artist	Top Latin Album
Ozuna; J Balvin; Daddy Yankee; Luis Fonsi; Romeo Santos	Odisea – Ozuna; Fenix – Nicky Jam; Me Dejé Llevar – Christian Nodal; Golden – Romeo Santos; El Dorado – Shakira
Top Latin Song	Top Dance/Electronic Artist
"Despacito" – Luis Fonsi and Daddy Yankee featuring Justin Bieber; "Mi Gente" – J Balvin and Willy William featuring Beyoncé; "Mayores" – Becky G featuring Bad Bunny; "Felices los 4" – Maluma; "Escápate Conmigo" – Wisin featuring Ozuna	The Chainsmokers; Calvin Harris; Kygo; Marshmello; ODESZA
Top Dance/Electronic Album	Top Dance/Electronic Song
Memories...Do Not Open – The Chainsmokers; Avīci (01) – Avicii; Funk Wav Bounces Vol. 1 – Calvin Harris; Stargazing – Kygo; A Moment Apart – ODESZA	"Something Just like This" – The Chainsmokers featuring Coldplay; "No Promises" – Cheat Codes featuring Demi Lovato; "Rockabye" – Clean Bandit featuring Sean Paul and Anne-Marie; "It Ain't Me" – Kygo and Selena Gomez; "Stay" – Zedd and Alessia Cara
Top Christian Artist	Top Christian Album
MercyMe; Elevation Worship; Hillsong UNITED; Hillsong Worship; Zach Williams	Precious Memories Collection – Alan Jackson; There Is a Cloud – Elevation Worship; Wonder – Hillsong UNITED; Let There Be Light – Hillsong Worship; Lifer – MercyMe
Top Christian Song	Top Gospel Artist
"What a Beautiful Name" – Hillsong Worship; "O Come to the Altar" – Elevation Worship; "I'll Find You" - Lecrae featuring Tori Kelly; "Even If" – MercyMe; "Old Church Choir" – Zach Williams	Tasha Cobbs Leonard; Anthony Brown & group therAPy; Travis Greene; J.J. Hairston & Youthful Praise; Tamela Mann
Top Gospel Album	Top Gospel Song
Heart. Passion. Pursuit. – Tasha Cobbs Leonard; A Long Way From Sunday – Anthony Brown & group therAPy; Crossover: Live from Music City – Travis Greene; You Deserve It - J.J. Hairston & Youthful Praise; Close – Marvin Sapp	"You Deserve It" – J.J. Hairston & Youthful Praise; "Trust In You" – Anthony Brown & group therAPy; "You Waited" – Travis Greene; "Change Me" – Tamela Mann; "I'm Blessed" – Charlie Wilson
Top Soundtrack/Cast Album	Billboard Chart Achievement (fan-voted)
Moana; Black Panther: The Album; The Fate of the Furious: The Album; The Greatest Showman; Guardians of the Galaxy Vol. 2: Awesome Mix Vol. 2	Camila Cabello; Cardi B; Drake; Sam Hunt; Ed Sheeran
Top Social Artist (fan-voted)	Icon Award
BTS; Justin Bieber; Ariana Grande; Demi Lovato; Shawn Mendes	Janet Jackson

=== Multiple wins and nominations ===
Artists that received multiple nominations
Nominations	Artist
15	Kendrick Lamar
15	Bruno Mars
15	Ed Sheeran
13	Post Malone
11	Imagine Dragons
9	Drake
8	Cardi B
8	Justin Bieber
7	Luis Fonsi
7	Daddy Yankee
6	The Chainsmokers
5	21 Savage
5	Coldplay
5	Sam Hunt
5	Chris Stapleton
5	Taylor Swift
4	Camila Cabello
4	Khalid
4	U2
4	The Weeknd
3	Anthony Brown & group therAPy
3	Kygo
3	Lil Uzi Vert
3	Linkin Park
3	Demi Lovato
3	MercyMe
3	Migos
3	Kane Brown
3	Ozuna
3	Florida Georgia Line
3	Portugal. The Man
3	Thomas Rhett
3	SZA
3	Hillsong Worship
2	Beyoncé
2	Tasha Cobbs Leonard
2	Luke Combs
2	French Montana
2	Guns N' Roses
2	Halsey
2	Calvin Harris
2	Hillsong UNITED
2	Tamela Mann
2	ODESZA
2	Charlie Puth
2	Quavo
2	Rihanna
2	Romeo Santos
2	Swae Lee
2	Zach Williams

Artists that received multiple awards
Wins	Artist
6	Kendrick Lamar
6	Ed Sheeran
5	Justin Bieber
5	Luis Fonsi
5	Bruno Mars
5	Daddy Yankee
4	Imagine Dragons
3	The Chainsmokers
3	Chris Stapleton
2	Taylor Swift
2	Ozuna
2	Tasha Cobbs Leonard
2	U2
