= Lo Harás Otra Vez =

Studio album by Elevation Worship
- Released: August 18, 2017
- Recorded: 2017
- Genre: Worship; Latin Christian music
- Length: 50:49
- Language: Spanish
- Label: Elevation Worship
- Producer: Chris Brown; Steven Furtick

Elevation Worship chronology
| There Is a Cloud (2017) | Lo Harás Otra Vez (2017) | Hallelujah Here Below (2018) |

Elevation Worship in Spanish chronology
| Lo Harás Otra Vez (2017) | Aleluya (En La Tierra) (2019) |

Lo Harás Otra Vez is the first album in Spanish by American contemporary worship band Elevation Worship. The album was released on August 18, 2017 through its own imprint label, Elevation Worship.

== Track listing ==
NOTE: These songs are Spanish-language translations of Elevation Worship songs in English. The original English-language song is listed next to each title.

| No. | Title | Length |
|---|---|---|
| 1. | "Como En El Cielo (Here As In Heaven)" | 8:19 |
| 2. | "No Vas A Parar (Unstoppable God)" | 4:18 |
| 3. | "Lo Harás Otra Vez (Do It Again)" | 6:17 |
| 4. | "El Que Resucitó (Resurrecting)" | 7:45 |
| 5. | "Ven Ante Su Trono (O Come to the Altar)" | 5:48 |
| 6. | "Jesús Vengo A Ti (Jesus I Come)" | 5:56 |
| 7. | "Plenitud (Fullness)" | 6:40 |
| 8. | "Hay Una Nube (There Is A Cloud)" | 5:49 |
| Total length: | | 50:49 |

== Chart performance ==
| Chart (2017) | Peak position |
|---|---|
| US Latin Album Sales (Billboard) | 2 |
| US Latin Pop Albums (Billboard) | 3 |
| US Top Latin Albums (Billboard) | 12 |
| US Top Christian Albums (Billboard) | 28 |
