= Nothing Is Wasted =

Nothing Is Wasted may refer to:

- Nothing Is Wasted (album), a 2013 album by Christian band Elevation Worship
- Nothing Is Wasted EP, a 2013 EP by Christian singer Jason Gray
  - "Nothing Is Wasted" (song), the title song from the EP
