= Here Comes Heaven =

2018 song by Elevation Worship

Single by Elevation Worship

from the album Hallelujah Here Below
- Released: November 30, 2018
- Recorded: March 2018
- Venue: Elevation Ballantyne, Charlotte, North Carolina, US
- Genre: Contemporary worship music
- Label: Elevation Worship Records
- Songwriters: Chris Brown; Steven Furtick
- Producers: Chris Brown; Aaron Robertson

Elevation Worship singles chronology
"Hallelujah Here Below" (2018)	"Here Comes Heaven" (2018)	"Resurrecting" (2018)

Music video
- "Here Comes Heaven" (Live) on YouTube

"Here Comes Heaven" is a song performed by American contemporary worship band Elevation Worship. On November 30, 2018, the song was released as the fifth single from their eleventh live album, Hallelujah Here Below (2018), to Christian radio stations in the United States. The song was written by Aaron Robertson, Chris Brown, and Steven Furtick. Chris Brown and Aaron Robertson handled the production of the single.

== Background ==
Elevation Worship first released a live performance video of the song recorded during a worship service at Elevation Ballantyne on December 28, 2017. The song was released by Elevation Worship on Hallelujah Here Below on September 28, 2018. Chris Brown spoke of the song, saying: "I love the message the Christmas season carries –– that 2,000 years ago God entered into our broken, messy lives. "Here Comes Heaven" is a joyful declaration that He's still doing the same today."

== Writing and development ==
Chris Brown had an interview with Kevin Davis, a lead contributor at NewReleaseToday about the song and the inspiration behind it. Davis asked about the personal story behind the song, to which Brown responded, saying:

We've always found it an interesting dynamic at church when we enter the Christmas season. In our church, we like to play some traditional Christmas hymns in our services on the weekends. But, those songs don't always engage people in worship. It's nice to hear Christmas hymns in December, and we like to draw people into the presence of God. We've always had an interesting dynamic where we sing upbeat versions of "Joy to the World" and "Angels We Have Heard on High." We've been looking for a way to write a piece about the Christmas season where it's a worship song first, as well as a Christmas song. We attempted it once before with "Let Us Adore," a song on one of our prior albums. And, it served us well. That was about four years ago. Within that context, about a year ago, we got together to write "Here Comes Heaven." We wrote it on a Monday and performed it in church the following Sunday. The song started with the lyric "Here Comes Heaven." Our pastor Steven Furtick was once a worship pastor and is an avid worshipper. When he prepares his Christmas sermons, he's always thinking about which phrases and themes from his sermons could translate into worship lyrics. That's how his mind works. He was thinking along the lines of "Here Comes Heaven" as an interesting way to approach a Christmas message.

== Composition ==
"Here Comes Heaven" is composed in the key of B with a tempo of 75 beats per minute, and a musical time signature of 6/8.

== Commercial performance ==
"Here Comes Heaven" made its debut at number 41 on Billboard's Christian Airplay chart dated December 8, 2018. It went on to peak at number 27 on the chart, and spent a total of five weeks on the Christian Airplay chart.

"Here Comes Heaven" debuted at number 39 on Billboard's Hot Christian Songs chart dated December 22, 2018. It went on to peak at number 36 on the chart, and spent a total of three weeks on the Hot Christian Songs chart.

== Music videos ==
The audio video for the "Here Comes Heaven" was availed on Elevation Worship's YouTube channel on September 28, 2018. On November 2, 2018, Elevation Worship released the live music video of "Here Comes Heaven" recorded at Elevation Church's Ballantyne campus on its YouTube channel.

== Charts ==
Chart (2018)	Peak position
US Hot Christian Songs (Billboard)	36
US Christian Airplay (Billboard)	27

== Release history ==
Original version
Region	Date	Format	Label	Ref.
United States	November 30, 2018	Christian radio	Elevation Worship Records	
United States	November 29, 2019 (re-release)	Christian radio	Elevation Worship Records	
