= At Midnight (EP) =

EP by Elevation Worship
- Released: August 30, 2019
- Recorded: 2019
- Venue: Elevation Matthews, Matthews, North Carolina, U.S.
- Genre: Contemporary worship music
- Length: 30:43
- Label: Elevation Worship
- Producer: Aaron Robertson

Elevation Worship EP chronology
Resurrecting (2018)	At Midnight (2019)	A La Medianoche (2020)

Elevation Worship chronology
Aleluya (En La Tierra) (2019)	At Midnight (2019)	Graves Into Gardens (2020)

Singles from At Midnight
- 1. "See a Victory" Released: August 9, 2019

At Midnight (stylized in capital letters) is the third live EP by American contemporary worship band Elevation Worship. The EP was released through Elevation Worship Records on August 30, 2019. The EP was preceded by the release of "See a Victory" as a single on August 9, 2019.

The EP was a commercial success, as it debuted at No. 2 on Billboard's Christian Albums chart.

== Background ==
At Midnight came into view when Hallels reported that Elevation Worship would be releasing a new single titled "See a Victory" on August 9, 2019. Chris Brown of Elevation Worship talked about the inspiration behind the EP, saying:

For this album, we drew a lot of inspiration from Acts 16 where Paul and Silas are thrown into prison... As they worshipped God, verse 25 tell us that the prison doors swung open at midnight and their chains were loosed. With this project, we asked the question: What if our praise was the kind of praise that broke chains?

== Singles ==
"See a Victory" was released in digital format as the lead single to At Midnight on August 9, 2019.

== Critical reception ==
Professional ratings
Review scores
Source	Rating
Jesus Freak Hideout	4.5/5 stars

Kevin Davis of NewReleaseToday gave a favourable review of the EP, describing it as "a moving and prayerful worship experience." Jesus Freak Hideout's Michael Weaver described the EP in his four-and-a-half star review as "a really solid modern worship recording."

=== Accolades ===
Awards
Year	Organization	Award	Result	Ref
2020	GMA Dove Awards	Worship Album of the Year	Pending	

Year-end lists
Publication	Accolade	Rank	Ref.
365 Days of Inspiring Media	Top 20 EPs of 2019	17	
NewReleaseToday	Top 10 Worship Albums of 2019	3	

== Commercial performance ==
In the United States, At Midnight launched at No. 149 on the mainstream Billboard 200 chart dated September 14, 2019, and landed at No. 2 on the Billboard Christian Albums chart that same week, with sales amounting to 7,000 equivalent album units. It is their ninth top ten entry on the Christian Albums chart.

== Track listing ==
At Midnight
No.	Title	Writer(s)	Length
1.	"Gone"	Steven Furtick; Davide Mutendji	4:10
2.	"It Is So"	Brian Johnson; Chris Brown; Furtick; Tiffany Hammer	5:50
3.	"See a Victory"	Ben Fielding; Jason Ingram; Furtick; Brown	6:03
4.	"Love Won't Give Up"	Brown; Furtick	4:39
5.	"With You"	Brown; Furtick; Hammer	10:01
Total length:			30:43

Digital re-release bonus track
No.	Title	Length
6.	"See A Victory" (Studio)	4:15
Total length:		34:58

- Songwriting credits adapted from PraiseCharts.

== Charts ==
=== Weekly charts ===
Weekly chart performance for At Midnight
Chart (2019)	Peak position
US Billboard 200	149
US Christian Albums (Billboard)	2

=== Year-end charts ===
Year-end chart performance for At Midnight
Chart (2020)	Position
US Christian Albums (Billboard)	44

== Release history ==
Region	Version	Date	Format(s)	Label(s)	Ref.
Various	Original	August 30, 2019	Digital download; streaming	Elevation Worship Records	
Various	Original	September 10, 2019	Vinyl	Elevation Worship Records	
Various	Re-release	January 10, 2020	Digital download; streaming	Elevation Worship Records	
