= With You (Elevation Worship song) =

2019 song by Elevation Worship

Single by Elevation Worship

from the album Paradoxology
- Released: April 5, 2019
- Recorded: 2019
- Genre: Contemporary worship music
- Length: 6:04
- Label: Elevation Worship
- Songwriters: Chris Brown; Steven Furtick; Tiffany Hudson
- Producer: Aaron Robertson

Elevation Worship singles chronology
"Eco" (2019)	"With You" (2019)	"See a Victory" (2019)

Music videos
- "With You" on YouTube
- "With You" (Acoustic) on YouTube
- "With You" (Live) on YouTube
- "With You" (Lyrics) on YouTube

"With You" is a song performed by American contemporary worship band Elevation Worship. On April 5, 2019, it was released as the lead single from their album, Paradoxology (2019). The song was written by Chris Brown, Steven Furtick and Tiffany Hudson. Aaron Robertson handled the production of the single.

"With You" peaked at No. 22 on the US Hot Christian Songs chart.

== Background ==
Elevation Worship released "With You" on April 5, 2019, as the lead single to Paradoxology (2019), an album of largely consisting of reimagined tracks on their 2018 live album, Hallelujah Here Below.

On August 30, 2019, Elevation Worship released the live version of "With You" on their extended play, At Midnight.

== Composition ==
"With You" is composed in the key of G with a tempo of 90 beats per minute and a musical time signature of 4/4.

== Commercial performance ==
"With You (Paradoxology)" debuted at No. 22 on the US Hot Christian Songs chart dated April 20, 2019, concurrently charting at No. 4 on the Christian Digital Song Sales chart. The song spent a total of twenty non-consecutive weeks on Hot Christian Songs Chart.

== Music videos ==
The official music video for "With You (Paradoxology)" shot on location at Savona Mill was published on Elevation Worship's YouTube channel on April 5, 2019. Elevation Worship released the official lyric video for the song on YouTube on May 3, 2019. On October 21, 2019, Elevation Worship released the live performance video of the song on YouTube. On October 28, 2019, Elevation Worship uploaded the acoustic performance video of the song on YouTube.

== Charts ==
=== Weekly charts ===
Weekly chart performance for "With You"
Chart (2019)	Peak position
US Hot Christian Songs (Billboard)	22

=== Year-end charts ===
Year-end chart performance for "With You"
Chart (2019)	Peak position
US Christian Songs (Billboard)	94

== Release history ==
Region	Date	Format	Label	Ref.
Various	April 5, 2019	Digital download; streaming	Elevation Worship Records	
