= For the Honor =

Live album by Elevation Worship
- Released: November 21, 2011
- Recorded: February 25, 2011
- Genre: Worship
- Length: 73:05
- Label: Essential Worship, Provident Label Group
- Producer: Aaron Robertson

Elevation Worship chronology
Kingdom Come (2010)	For the Honor (2011)	Nothing Is Wasted (2013)

For the Honor is the first live album from the American contemporary worship band Elevation Worship. It was recorded live at Elevation Blakeney. Provident Label Group released the album on November 21, 2011. Aaron Robertson produced the album.

== Critical reception ==
Professional ratings
Review scores
Source	Rating
AllMusic	3.5/5 stars
Jesus Freak Hideout	3.5/5 stars
Louder Than the Music	4/5 stars

Tincan Caldwell of Jesus Freak Hideout, rating the album three and a half stars out of a possible five, says that "The creative will it would take to make a whole new worship liturgy for your church body is laudable, and the Elevation Church in Charlotte, North Carolina has written a commendable and solid batch of songs, as they demonstrate on their live recording For the Honor." Awarding the album three and a half stars, David Jeffries of AllMusic stated that the album "flirts with arena rock, synth pop, and dance-pop, delivering its gospel message with a contemporary punch and mass-appeal beats." Jono Davies, signalling in a four star review at Louder Than the Music, writes, "If you enjoy the big guitars and big anthems then this album is well worth checking out."

== Track listing ==
Standard edition
No.	Title	Writer(s)	Length
1.	"Exalted One"	Chris Brown, London Gatch, Mack Brock, Wade Joye	4:51
2.	"The Lord Is My Rock" / "God You Lifted Me Out"	Joye, Brown, Brock	5:38
3.	"For the Honor"	Brown, Brock, Steven Furtick, Joye	5:50
4.	"God Be Praised"	Brown, Jane Williams, Brock, Joye	4:49
5.	"The Church"	Brown, Brock	4:58
6.	"The Highest"	Brad Hudson, Brown, Gatch, Brock, Joye	5:18
7.	"Victorious"	Brown, Justin Land, Lee McDerment, Brock, Joye	6:35
8.	"We Rejoice"	Brown, Brock, Joye	4:23
9.	"Give Me Faith"	Brown, Gatch, Brock, Joye	5:06
10.	"All Things New"	Ben Richter, Brown, Brock, Joye	6:59
11.	"The Gospel"	Furtick	3:36
12.	"You Reign Alone"	Richter, Brown, Williams, Gatch, Brock, Joye	5:06
13.	"Give My Life to You"	Brock	6:16
14.	"Our King Has Come"	Brown, Brock, Joye	3:40
Total length:			73:05

Deluxe edition
No.	Title	Writer(s)	Length
1.	"Exalted One"		4:51
2.	"The Lord Is My Rock" / "God You Lifted Me Out"		5:38
3.	"For the Honor"		7:36
4.	"God Be Praised"		4:49
5.	"The Church"		4:59
6.	"Let Your Kingdom Reign"	Brock, Brown	3:34
7.	"The Highest"		5:19
8.	"Only Love"	Brock, Brown, Gatch, Hudson, Joye, Williams	5:29
9.	"We Rejoice"		4:29
10.	"Sing Forever" / "Awesome God"	Brock, Rich Mullins	4:31
11.	"Give Me Faith"		5:07
12.	"All Things New"		6:59
13.	"The Gospel"		3:36
14.	"You Reign Alone"		5:00
15.	"Victorious"		6:37
16.	"Give My Life to You"		6:16
17.	"Our King Has Come"		3:40
18.	"We Rejoice" (Video)		4:29
19.	"Victorious" (Video)		6:33
20.	"For the Honor" (Video)		5:43
21.	"All Things New" (Video)		6:55
22.	"God Be Praised" (Video)		4:46
23.	"Behind the scenes featurette" (Video)		4:37

== Chart positions ==
Chart (2011)	Peak position
US Billboard 200	193
US Top Christian Albums (Billboard)	19
