= Aleluya (En La Tierra) =

Studio album by Elevation Worship
- Released: July 19, 2019
- Recorded: 2019
- Genre: Worship; Latin Christian music
- Length: 58:28
- Language: Spanish
- Label: Elevation Worship
- Producer: Chris Brown; Steven Furtick

Elevation Worship chronology
Paradoxology (2019)	Aleluya (En La Tierra) (2019)	At Midnight (2019)

Elevation Worship in Spanish chronology
Lo Harás Otra Vez (2017)	Aleluya (En La Tierra) (2019)

Aleluya (En La Tierra) is the second album in Spanish by American contemporary worship band Elevation Worship. The album was released on July 19, 2019 through its own imprint label, Elevation Worship Records.

== Critical reception ==
Professional ratings
Review scores
Source	Rating
365 Days of Inspiring Media	3.5/5 stars

Joshua Andre, specifying in a three and a half star review for 365 Days of Inspiring Media, replies "Last week, Aleluya (En La Tierra) released. Yep, it’s the Spanish version of Hallelujah Here Below. While I love albums sung in another language- it allows God to move and you to be more susceptible to the Holy Spirit; I reckon this release is overkill".

== Awards and accolades ==
In the 2020 the album Aleluya (En La Tierra) was nominated for a Dove Award in the category "Spanish Language Album of the Year" at the 51st GMA Dove Awards.

Awards
Year	Organization	Award	Result	Ref
2020	GMA Dove Awards	Spanish Language Album of the Year	Won	

== Track listing ==
NOTE: These songs are Spanish-language translations of Elevation Worship songs in English. The original English-language song is listed next to each title.

No.	Title	Writer(s)	Length
1.	"No Se Detendrá" (Won't Stop Now)	Chris Brown / Steven Furtick	5:08
2.	"Dios De Promesas (feat. Evan Craft)" (God of the Promise)	Chris Brown / Steven Furtick / Aaron Robertson	4:09
3.	"Aleluya (En La Tierra)" (Hallelujah Here Below)	Chris Brown / Steven Furtick	5:58
4.	"Contigo" (With You)	Chris Brown / Steven Furtick / Tiffany Hammer	6:05
5.	"Encuéntrame Otra Vez" (Here Again)	Chris Brown / Steven Furtick / Amy Corbett	6:46
6.	"Eco" (Echo)	Steven Furtick / Brown / Matthews Ntlele / Israel Houghton / Alexander Pappas	3:46
7.	"Digno (Worthy)"	Chris Brow / Mack Brock / Steven Furtick	6:18
8.	"Viene El Cielo" (Here Comes Heaven)	Steven Furtick / Chris Brown / Aaron Robertson	4:33
9.	"Poderoso Dios (feat. Evan Craft)" (Mighty God)	Chris Brown / Steven Furtick	4:54
10.	"Poder" (Power)	Chris Brown / Steven Furtick / Amy Corbett	5:11
11.	"Fiel" (Faithful)	Steven Furtick	5:33
Total length:			58:28

== Chart performance ==
Chart (2019)	Peak position
US Latin Album Sales (Billboard)	8
US Christian Album Sales (Billboard)	49
