= Nothing Is Wasted EP =

EP by Elevation Worship
- Released: December 14, 2012
- Recorded: 2012
- Genre: Worship
- Length: 20:02
- Label: Essential

Nothing Is Wasted EP is an extended play from American contemporary worship band Elevation Worship. The EP was released on December 14, 2012 by Essential Records.

== Background ==
According to Louder Than The Music, Elevation Worship released the EP in December 2012 "as a taster" for their succeeding release, a live album also called "Nothing Is Wasted", which was released in February 2013. The EP consisted of two songs, "Nothing Is Wasted" and "Open Up Our Eyes", each having the live performance and studio versions thus making it four tracks.

== Critical reception ==
Professional ratings
Review scores
Source	Rating
Louder Than The Music	4/5 stars

Jono Davies of Louder Than The Music, affixing a four-star rating on the EP, says that "I know you're not supposed to compare the two versions, it's not why they were put on this taster EP, but it's hard not too." and listed the studio version of "Open Up Your Eyes" and the live version of "Nothing Is Wasted" as the standout tracks of the EP.

== Track listing ==
Standard edition
No.	Title	Writer(s)	Length
1.	"Open Up Our Eyes" (Live)	Mack Brock, Chris Brown, Stuart Garrard, London Gatch, Wade Joye	4:38
2.	"Nothing Is Wasted" (Live)	Brock, Brown, Jess Cates, Steven Furtick, Gatch, Jason Ingram, Joye	5:45
3.	"Open Up Our Eyes"		4:08
4.	"Nothing Is Wasted"		5:31
Total length:			20:02
