= Perry Noble =

American pastor and author

Perry Noble (born June 24, 1971) is an American preacher, author, and the senior pastor of the Second Chance Church.

== Early life and family ==
Perry Noble was born on June 24, 1971. Noble says he was sexually abused when he was 5 years old and a few years later by a different abuser. Perry has revealed that his mother died of cancer when he was 12, and that this experience made him dislike hospital visits for a long time even after he became a pastor. Noble said he had a rough relationship with his father following his mother's death. He said his father fell into depression, developed a gambling problem, and became a drug dealer. He was homeless for a time during high school. He had rebellious youth, but returned to attending church at 18. On May 27, 1990, he had a conversion experience.

Noble attended Southeastern Baptist Theological Seminary to pursue a Masters of Divinity degree, but dropped out after three years. Noble claimed to have been unanimously approved by an ordination council of the Saluda Baptist Association. On May 28, 1995, he was ordained into the ministry by North Anderson Baptist Church.

== Ministry ==
He founded NewSpring Church in Anderson, South Carolina in January 2000. His weekly sermons were watched by over 32,000 people at 11 satellite campuses across the state of South Carolina with an additional 7,200 viewers tuned in weekly via online live stream. On July 1, 2016, Noble was removed as senior pastor of NewSpring church due to alcohol abuse and family issues.

Following his removal from NewSpring Church, Noble spent 30 days in a treatment facility in Arizona in July 2016 where he worked with a psychologist and ordained pastor with plans of returning to ministry.

Noble is close friends with Steven Furtick, pastor of Elevation Church in Charlotte, NC and is on Elevation's board of overseers. In February 2017, Noble was a guest preacher at Elevation. On June 28, 2017, Noble was a guest pastor at Powerhouse Christian Church in Anderson, SC.

On July 14, 2017, Noble filed paperwork with the South Carolina Secretary of State to incorporate a new church, while church leaders at NewSpring said that Noble does not meet the Biblical qualifications to be a pastor.

In 2018, Noble started a new church in Anderson and opened as a church plant in January 2019 under the name Second Chance Church.

== Personal life ==
His father was married several times. He married his former wife, Lucretia, in April 2000 and in June 2007 had a baby girl named Charisse.

In November 2017 Noble announced that his marriage was over.

In May 2021, Perry remarried Shannon Repokis. In August 2025, they adopted their son, Judah.

== Controversies ==
=== Lawsuit ===
In 2010, a professor at Anderson University filed a lawsuit against Noble, NewSpring Church, and church staff members alleging staff members harassed him online after he criticized Noble and NewSpring in blog posts. The lawsuit alleged that NewSpring staff members threatened him on Twitter, interfered with his plans for an adoption, and sent a fake resignation letter to his employer. A church spokeswoman said that when Noble learned of this harassment, the church fired the staff and cooperated with a police investigation. In 2012, the lawsuit was settled under undisclosed terms.

=== Racism ===
During a Christmas Eve service in 2014, Perry Noble sparked an incident regarding the use of what appeared to be the word nigger. NewSpring Church released a statement in response to allegations that Pastor Noble said the word nigger during his sermon saying,

In regards to your question about the ‘N’ word, Perry doesn’t use that word and doesn’t address anyone in his life by such a word. He did not use that word in his message and what you perceived as him doing so was [a] matter of words getting jumbled as can happen with anyone who is speaking.

Perry Noble was also quoted as saying ″I was also a racist. My grandparents used 'the n word' recreationally. In fact, most white people I knew did —and so I did too. I did not see black people as individual people with real hearts, real souls, real feelings and who really mattered to God — I saw them as a group of people who were different than me, thus allowing me to place them in a category and dismiss them as unimportant," said Perry. He continues, "But … something happened in me in 1990 that would begin to change (and is still changing) the way I see people — I prayed to receive Christ in my life, which truly is the catalyst for the changing of my heart and mind on the issue of the Confederate flag."

=== Ten Commandments ===
Following a sermon Noble delivered on Christmas Eve, a controversy arose regarding his wording at the beginning of his message. He made a claim stating that there was no Hebrew word for "command," when in fact, there was. Much pressure was put on Perry Noble and on NewSpring Church for this mistake, to the point of a heated tweet on Noble's Twitter page. Noble later apologized on his blog for this tweet and his original mistake.

=== Removal ===
On July 10, 2016, NewSpring Church announced that Perry Noble had been removed as Senior Pastor, due to alcohol abuse and neglect of his family duties.

=== Divorce ===
On November 1, 2017, Noble released a statement on Faithwire announcing his divorce from Lucretia Noble after 17 years of marriage. He stated that, “After being married for 17 years I have found myself in a place I never imagined I would be — as no one who has ever been married ever dreams in a million years that their marriage will one day end in divorce.”

== Publications ==
- Blue Prints: How to Build Godly Relationships
- Unleash!: Breaking Free from Normalcy
- Overwhelmed: Winning the War Against Worry
- The Most Excellent Way to Lead
- Overcoming Anxiety: A 30day Guide to Start Winning The War with Anxiety
- Overwhelmed (2014)
- Overcoming Anxiety (2019)
