= See a Victory =

Single by Elevation Worship

from the EP At Midnight
- Released: August 9, 2019
- Recorded: 2019
- Venue: Elevation Matthews, Matthews, North Carolina, US
- Genre: Worship; CCM
- Length: 6:03 (Live version); 4:15 (Studio version)
- Label: Elevation Worship Records
- Songwriters: Ben Fielding; Jason Ingram; Steven Furtick; Chris Brown
- Producer: Aaron Robertson

Elevation Worship singles chronology
"With You" (2019)	"See a Victory" (2019)	"Never Lost" (2019)

Music videos
- "See a Victory" (Acoustic) on YouTube
- "See a Victory" (Live) on YouTube
- "See a Victory" (Living Room Session) on YouTube
- "See a Victory" (Lyrics) on YouTube

"See a Victory" is a song performed by American contemporary worship band Elevation Worship released as the lead single from their seventh extended play, At Midnight (2019), on August 9, 2019. The song was written by Chris Brown, Ben Fielding, Jason Ingram and Steven Furtick. Chris Brown and Aaron Robertson handled the production of the single.

"See a Victory" was a commercial success, having reached No. 5 on the US Hot Christian Songs chart while becoming Elevation Worship's fifth top ten on the chart. It has been certified Platinum by Recording Industry Association of America (RIAA).

== Background ==
"See a Victory" came into view with an announcement by Elevation Worship that it would be released as the lead single from the extended play At Midnight, the song's release being slated for August 9, 2019. The song, with its accompanying live performance video, was released that day, along with availing of At Midnight for pre-order. Elevation Worship announced that "See a Victory" will impact US Christian radio stations on January 10, 2020.

The story behind the "See a Victory" was shared in Elevation Worship's announcement of the song being released to Christian radio. Chris Brown said:

You know, worship is a powerful weapon. It's like a counter-attack on whatever the enemy is trying to bring against you. When you're facing or battling anxiety, choose to worship your way through it. If you're feeling overwhelmed or uncertain, you can choose worship. In 1 Corinthians 15, it says, thanks be to God who gives us the victory through our Lord Jesus Christ. You can stand on the authority of the word of God, that whatever you're up against, it is no match for Jesus. He's never lost a battle before, and he's not going to start with yours. Our new song, "See A Victory," has become one of those songs that I've put in my own personal armory when I'm in the middle of a struggle or a fight. When I choose praise over fear, even in the face of overwhelming odds, I can trust that God is fighting my battles for me, and he's turning things around from my good in his glory. — Chris Brown

== Composition ==
"See a Victory" is composed in the key of B♭ major with a tempo of 155 beats per minute, and a musical time signature of 4/4.

== Music videos ==
On August 9, 2019, Elevation Worship released the extended live music video of "See a Victory" recorded at Elevation Church's Matthews campus on its YouTube channel. The lyric video of "See a Victory" was released by Elevation Worship on August 16, 2019. The acoustic performance video of the song was published on YouTube by Elevation Worship on August 23, 2019. Elevation Worship availed a Spanish acoustic rendition of the song, titled "Ver La Victoria" on their YouTube channel on September 18, 2019. On January 13, 2020, a "Living Room Session" performance video of the song was uploaded by Elevation Worship to YouTube.

== Accolades ==
Awards
Year	Organization	Award	Result	Ref
2020	GMA Dove Awards	Song of the Year	Nominated	

== Charts ==
=== Weekly charts ===
Weekly chart performance for "See a Victory"
Chart (2019–20)	Peak position
US Hot Christian Songs (Billboard)	5
US Christian Airplay (Billboard)	6

=== Year-end charts ===
Year-end chart performance for "See a Victory"
Chart (2019)	Peak position
US Christian Songs (Billboard)	67
Chart (2020)	Position
US Christian Songs (Billboard)	10
US Christian Airplay (Billboard)	16
US Christian AC (Billboard)	15

== Certifications ==
Region	Certification	Certified units/sales
New Zealand (RMNZ)	Gold	15,000^{‡}
United States (RIAA)	Platinum	1,000,000^{‡}
^{‡} Sales+streaming figures based on certification alone.

== Release history ==
Region	Version	Date	Format	Label	Ref.
Various	Live	August 9, 2019	Digital download; streaming	Elevation Worship Records	
Various	Studio	January 10, 2020	Digital download; streaming	Elevation Worship Records	
United States	Studio	January 10, 2020	Christian radio	Elevation Worship Records	
