= NewSpring Church =

- Location: Anderson, South Carolina
- Country: United States
- Denomination: Baptist
- Website: www.newspring.cc

History
- Founded: January 24, 2000; 26 years ago
- Founder: Perry Noble

NewSpring Church is a Baptist Evangelical multi-site megachurch based in Anderson, South Carolina.

== History ==
The church was founded in January 2000 with a handful of people in a living room. Since then, it has grown to 13 locations across the state of South Carolina. In addition to gathering at multiple campuses across the state, NewSpring has established an online campus to connect with individuals who cannot join in person.

In 2016, the weekly attendance was 33,000 people.

Announced July 10, 2016, founder Perry Noble was removed as Senior Pastor by the church's leadership team effective July 1, 2016 for personal issues related to alcohol and neglect of his family.

A year later it was announced that NewSpring would be led by a team of Lead Pastors (Brad Cooper, Michael Mullikin, Tyler Tatum, David Hall, Lee McDerment, and Riley Cummings) and Teaching Pastors (Brad Cooper, Clayton King, Dan Lian, and Lee McDerment) would share the stage on Sundays.

In 2016, the church was left with a $47 million debt, but paid this down year on year, so that in March 2023 it was able to announce it was debt free.

In November 2018, CBS News ranked NewSpring Church as the eight largest megachurch in the United States with about 23,055 weekly visitors.

According to a church census released in 2023, it claimed a weekly attendance of 10,000 people.

The church is based in Anderson, SC. It operates satellite campuses in 12 other South Carolina cities.

In April 2025, due to criticism from pastors of other churches regarding the hiring of a female pastor at NewSpring, which contradicts the Southern Baptist Convention's statement of faith, which professes that pastoral ministry is reserved for men, it terminated its membership with the Convention, in order to preserve unity in the body of Christ.

== Beliefs ==
The Church has a Baptist confession of faith.

Regarding why NewSpring does not include Baptist in its name, founding pastor Perry Noble said “denominational loyalty is at an all-time low” and “Jesus did not die for denominations, he died for the church.”

== Ministries ==
NewSpring has many ministries within the church. Here is a list of active ministries of NewSpring Church.

- KidSpring (Children's Ministry)
- [FUSE] (Student Ministry)
- NewSpring Worship (Worship Ministry)
- NewSpring Missions (Missions)

=== NewSpring Worship ===
NewSpring Worship
- Also known as: NewSpring
- Origin: Anderson, South Carolina
- Genre: Worship
- Years active: 2010–present
- Website: newspringworship.com

NewSpring Worship is an American Christian music worship group from Anderson, South Carolina, established in 2010 at NewSpring Church. They have released 5 albums, 4 EPs, and 11 singles. They play worship music for the congregation at their services.

The group began recording in 2010, with the album Our God Is Love, released January 1, 2010.

== Sexual Abuse Cases ==
NewSpring Church volunteers had multiple child sex abuse allegations and over a dozen victims.

In 2016, youth group volunteer Leo LaSalle Comissiong, then 20, was charged with third-degree criminal sexual conduct with a minor. In February 2016, Comissiong allegedly kissed and fondled a 15-year-old boy in NewSpring campus in Florence, SC. In April 2016, Comissiong admitted to investigators that he fondled and kissed the boy. He pleaded guilty to a lesser charge of assault and was sentenced to three years probation.

In May 2016, church volunteer Chaz Wood, then 23, was charged with one count of Criminal Sexual Conduct with a Minor. According to police report, Wood fondled a 10-year-old boy on December 6, 2015. He was a volunteer at the NewSpring campus in Anderson, SC. In December 2017, Wood pleaded guilty to a charge of assault and battery. Wood is listed in the Houston Chronicle's database of sexual abusers in Southern Baptist churches.

Church volunteer Jacop Hazlett, then 28, was charged with first-degree criminal sexual conduct with a minor on November 28, 2018. Investigators said Hazlett molested a three year old in a bathroom on the NewSpring campus in North Charleston, SC on November 25, 2018. Hazlett was charged with sexually assaulting at least 14 preschool age boys in the church. The church claimed that Hazlett passed a background check; however, at 17, he was charged with gross sexual imposition of a young boy in Columbiana County, Ohio. Between 2011 and 2015, Hazlett volunteered with The Cove Church and Elevation Church in the Charlotte, NC area. In both churches, concerns were raised against Hazlett and he was moved to positions away from children. On December 12, 2019, following a two-day jury trial, Hazlett was found guilty of sexually abusing several minors and was sentenced to 75 years in prison.

In 2019, the sexual abuse victims of Hazlett filed five personal injury lawsuits against NewSpring Church. According to a lawsuit's initial complaint, NewSpring failed to contact the two churches in North Carolina that Hazlett used to volunteer with but was asked to leave due to "concerns about his behavior around children." The final lawsuit against the church was settled in November 2023.

== Notable Members ==
- Dabo Swinney
- Trevor Lawrence

== See also ==
- List of megachurches in the United States
- Megachurch
- Sexual abuse cases in Southern Baptist churches
- Perry Noble
