= Billboard Music Award for Top Christian Album =

Annual American music award

The Billboard Music Award for Top Christian Album winners and nominees.

== Winners and nominees ==
Year	Album	Artist	Other nominees
1998	Sittin' on Top of the World	LeAnn Rimes	
2011	Awake	Skillet	MercyMe-The Generous Mr. Lovewell; Tobymac-Tonight; Chris Tomlin-And If Our God Is For Us... (Deluxe Edition); Various Artists-WOW Hits 2011
2012	Come to the Well	Casting Crowns	Casting Crowns-Until the Whole World Hears; Skillet-Awake; Laura Story-Blessings; Various Artists-WOW Hits 2012
2013	Eye On It	Tobymac	Casting Crowns-Come to the Well; LeCrae-Gravity; MercyMe-The Hurt & The Healer; Various Artists-WOW Hits 2013
2014	Precious Memories Volume II	Alan Jackson	Skillet-Rise; Miracle-Third Day; Chris Tomlin-Burning Lights; Various Artists-WOW Hits 2014
2015	Anomaly	Lecrae	Casting Crowns-Thrive; MercyMe-Welcome to the New; Needtobreathe-Rivers in the Wasteland; Chris Tomlin-Love Ran Red
2016	How Can It Be	Lauren Daigle	Hillsong United-Empires; Joey + Rory-Hymns That Are Important to Us; TobyMac-This Is Not a Test; Chris Tomlin-Adore: Christmas Songs of Worship
2017	How Can It Be	Lauren Daigle	Casting Crowns-The Very Next Thing; Hillary Scott & the Family-Love Remains; Joey + Rory-Hymns That Are Important to Us; Skillet-Unleashed
2018	Precious Memories Collection	Alan Jackson	Elevation Worship-There Is a Cloud; Hillsong United-Wonder; Hillsong Worship-Let There Be Light; MercyMe-Lifer
2019	Look Up Child	Lauren Daigle	Cory Asbury–Reckless Love; For King & Country–Burn the Ships; Hillsong Worship–There Is More; Zach Williams–Chain Breaker
2020	Jesus Is King	Kanye West	Bethel Music–Victory: Recorded Live; Casting Crowns–Only Jesus; Hillsong United–People; Skillet–Victorious
2021	My Gift	Carrie Underwood	Bethel Music–Peace; Elevation Worship–Graves into Gardens; We the Kingdom–Holy Water; Zach Williams–Rescue Story
2022	Donda	Ye	Carrie Underwood–My Savior; CeCe Winans–Believe for It; Elevation Worship & Maverick City Music–Old Church Basement; Phil Wickham–Hymn of Heaven
2023	My Jesus	Anne Wilson	Brandon Lake–House of Miracles; CAIN–Rise Up; Elevation Worship–Lion; Lauren Daigle–Lauren Daigle
2024	Can You Imagine?	Elevation Worship	Forrest Frank–Child of God; Brandon Lake–Coat of Many Colors; Maverick City Music, Chandler Moore & Naomi Raine–The Maverick Way Complete: Complete Vol 02; Katy Nichole–Jesus Changed My Life

== Superlatives ==
Four nominations

- Casting Crowns
- Chris Tomlin

Three nominations

- MercyMe
- TobyMac
- Skillet

Two nominations

- Lecrae
