= Resurrecting =

Single by Elevation Worship

from the album Here as in Heaven
- Released: December 26, 2018
- Recorded: July 31, 2015
- Genre: Worship; Christian pop; Christian rock
- Length: 7:47
- Label: Essential Worship; Provident Label Group
- Songwriters: Chris Brown; Mack Brock; Matthews Ntlele; Steven Furtick; Wade Joye
- Producers: Brock; Aaron Robertson; Steven Furtick

Elevation Worship singles chronology
"Here Comes Heaven" (2018)	"Resurrecting" (2018)	"Encuéntrame Otra Vez" (2019)

Music videos
- "Resurrecting" (Live) on YouTube
- "Resurrecting" (Acoustic) on YouTube
- "Resurrecting" (Lyrics) on YouTube

"Resurrecting" is a song performed by American contemporary worship band Elevation Worship. Written by Chris Brown, Mack Brock, Matthews Ntlele, Steven Furtick, and Wade Joye, the song was released as the second single from their 2016 album Here as in Heaven. It was released to Christian radio on December 26, 2018. The song peaked at No. 3 on the US Hot Christian Songs chart, becoming their third Top 10 single from the chart. The song is played in a D♭ major key, and 74 beats per minute.

== Background ==
"Resurrecting" was released as the second single from their fifth live album Here as in Heaven. It was released to Christian radio on December 26, 2018. It was recorded live at Spectrum Center in Charlotte, North Carolina.

== Composition ==
"Resurrecting" is originally in the key of D♭ major, with a tempo of 74 beats per minute. Written in common time, the vocal range spans from C_{4} to F_{5} during the song.

== Track listing ==
Digital format — EP
No.	Title	Length
1.	"Resurrecting" (Studio Version)	4:24
2.	"Resurrecting" (Live)	7:47
3.	"Resurrecting" (featuring The Walls Group)	8:14
4.	"Resurrecting" (Acoustic)	5:49
5.	"Él Que Resucitó" (Resurrecting)	7:45
6.	"Resurrecting" (Instrumental)	7:47
Total length:		41:46

== Music videos ==
The lyric video of "Resurrecting" was published on YouTube on January 11, 2019. The live music video of "Resurrecting", recorded at Elevation Church's Ballantyne campus in Charlotte, North Carolina was released on January 14, 2019, through YouTube. An acoustic video was also released on January 24, 2019. The lyric video of the song's Spanish version titled "Él Que Resucito (Resurrecting)" was released on August 22, 2017, via YouTube.

== Charts ==
=== Weekly charts ===
Chart (2017–19)	Peak position
US Hot Christian Songs (Billboard)	3
US Christian Airplay (Billboard)	4
US Christian AC (Billboard)	5
US Christian AC Indicator (Billboard)	4

=== Year-end charts ===
Chart (2019)	Position
US Christian Songs (Billboard)	8
US Christian Airplay (Billboard)	7
US Christian AC (Billboard)	12
US Christian CHR (Billboard)	30

== Certifications ==
Region	Certification	Certified units/sales
United States (RIAA)	Platinum	1,000,000^{‡}
^{‡} Sales+streaming figures based on certification alone.

== Release history ==
Region	Date	Format	Label	Ref.
Various	February 5, 2016	Digital download (EP); streaming (EP)	Elevation Worship	
United States	December 26, 2018	Christian hot AC radio; Christian contemporary hit radio	Elevation Worship	
