= Here Again (song) =

Single by Elevation Worship

from the album Hallelujah Here Below
- Released: August 17, 2018
- Recorded: March 2018
- Venue: Elevation Ballantyne, Charlotte, North Carolina, US
- Genre: Contemporary worship music
- Length: 6:45
- Label: Elevation Worship Records
- Songwriters: Chris Brown; Steven Furtick; Amy Corbett
- Producers: Chris Brown; Aaron Robertson

Elevation Worship singles chronology
"Won't Stop Now" (2018)	"Here Again" (2018)	"Echo" (2018)

Music videos
- "Here Again" (Live) on YouTube
- "Here Again" (YouTube Exclusive) on YouTube
- "Here Again" (Paradoxology) on YouTube

"Here Again" is a song performed by American contemporary worship band Elevation Worship released as the second single from their eleventh live album, Hallelujah Here Below (2018), on August 17, 2018. The song was written by Amy Corbett, Chris Brown and Steven Furtick. Chris Brown and Aaron Robertson handled the production of the single.

== Background ==
"Here Again" was released by Elevation Worship as the second single from the album Hallelujah Here Below in anticipation of its release, which was slated for September 28, 2018. The song was recorded in March 2018 at Elevation Ballantyne in Charlotte, North Carolina.

On February 1, 2019, a Spanish rendition of the song, titled "Encuéntrame Otra Vez (Here Again)" was released by Elevation Worship. On April 12, 2019, a revamped version of "Here Again" was released on Elevation Worship's album Paradoxology (2019), a collection of revamped songs initially released on Hallelujah Here Below.

== Writing and development ==
Chris Brown had an interview with Kevin Davis, lead contributor at NewReleaseToday about the song and the inspiration behind it. Davis asked about the personal story behind the song, to which Brown responded, saying:

This is one of the most personal songs we've written. It's always going to be one of those songs where I'll never forget the time, and the place the song was finished. It was written under difficult circumstances for me personally. I've seen loved ones pass away where they are caught in the middle between earth and heaven. And, I had gone through a season of life caught in the middle of family rhythms and ministry. "Here Again" started with the concept of being "here in the middle" and meeting God in that place. Later, when we came back to the song, we were in another season of reflection and not knowing what was ahead. Things didn't look like they used to. In that moment, it was a lightbulb moment for us to turn to Genesis 28 and Jacob's dream. He had been a cheat and a liar, and he was not a great guy. He had gone through a journey and then had this revelation where he sees the ladder going up to heaven and says the Lord has been in this place. That was the turning point for finishing this song. — Chris Brown, NewReleaseToday

== Composition ==
"Here Again" is composed in the key of D major with a tempo of 81 beats per minute, and a musical time signature of 4/4.

== Music videos ==
On August 17, 2018, Elevation Worship released the extended live music video of "Here Again" recorded at Elevation Church's Ballantyne campus on its YouTube channel. A "YouTube Exclusive" live performance video of "Here Again" recorded at the YouTube Space in New York was released by Elevation Worship on January 18, 2019. The lyric video of "Encuéntrame Otra Vez (Here Again)" in Spanish was published on YouTube by Elevation Worship on February 8, 2019. The music video for the Paradoxology rendition of "Here Again" shot on location at Savona Mill was availed on Elevation Worship's YouTube channel on April 15, 2019.

== Tracklisting ==
"Here Again"
No.	Title	Writer(s)	Length
1.	"Here Again"	Chris Brown; Steven Furtick; Amy Corbett	6:45

"Encuéntrame Otra Vez" (Spanish version)
No.	Title	Translator(s)	Length
1.	"Encuéntrame Otra Vez"	Abraham Osorio; Evan Craft; David Espíndola; Crystal Velez; Isaac Moraleja; Edgar Aguilar	6:49

== Charts ==
=== Weekly charts ===
Chart (2018)	Peak position
US Hot Christian Songs (Billboard)	20

=== Year-end charts ===
Chart (2018)	Peak position
US Christian Songs (Billboard)	92

== Release history ==
Original version
Region	Version	Date	Format	Label	Ref.
Various	Live	August 17, 2018	Digital download; streaming	Elevation Worship Records	
Various	Spanish	February 1, 2019	Digital download; streaming	Elevation Worship Records	
