= Wake Up the Wonder =

Live album by Elevation Worship
- Released: November 24, 2014
- Recorded: August 1, 2014
- Venue: Spectrum Center, Charlotte, North Carolina, USA
- Genre: Worship
- Length: 73:46
- Label: Essential
- Producer: Mack Brock, Aaron Robertson

Elevation Worship chronology
Only King Forever (2014)	Wake Up the Wonder (2014)	Here as in Heaven (2016)

Singles from Wake Up the Wonder
- 1. "Unstoppable God" Released: December 18, 2015

Wake Up the Wonder is the fourth live album from Elevation Worship. The album was recorded at the Spectrum in Charlotte, North Carolina with more than 16,000 in attendance. Essential Worship released the album on November 24, 2014.

== Critical reception ==
Professional ratings
Review scores
Source	Rating
CCM Magazine	3/5 stars
Cross Rhythms	7/10 squares
Jesus Wired	9.5/10 stars
Worship Leader	4/5 stars

Awarding the album four stars at Worship Leader, Jeremy Armstrong states, "Wake Up generally looks to help people find the wonder of God in the gospel message." Tony Cummings, rating the album a seven out of ten for Cross Rhythms, says, "So one is left trying to find particular songs that might have the legs to travel to churches beyond North Carolina." Giving the album three stars from CCM Magazine, Andy Argyrakis writes, "the songs reflect the awe and majesty of the Lord with plenty victorious praises, all of which are admirable qualities, but ones that would come alive all the more had the music steered beyond the typical modern worship mold." Jessica Morris, indicating in a nine and a half out of ten review by Jesus Wired, describes, "Wake Up The Wonder is fresh, compelling, curious and riveting."

== Awards and accolades ==
The album's live concert film was nominated for a 2015 GMA Dove Award for Long Form Video of the Year.

== Commercial performance ==
The album debuted at No. 58 on Billboard chart in its first week, selling around 16,000 copies in the United States. It also debuted at No. 1 on Billboard's Christian chart, as well as No. 21 on the Digital Albums chart. The album has sold 31,000 in the United States as of December 2015.

== Track listing ==
No.	Title	Writer(s)	Length
1.	"Already Won"	Mack Brock, Chris Brown, Pastor Steven Furtick, Wade Joye	4:04
2.	"Unstoppable God"	Brown, Furtick, Joye	4:21
3.	"Jesus I Come"	Brown, Furtick	5:51
4.	"Ever Glorious"	Brock, Brown, Furtick, Joye	5:20
5.	"Jesus Forever"	Brock, Brown, Furtick, Joye	5:18
6.	"Your Promises"	Brock, Brown, Furtick, Joye	4:58
7.	"The King Is Among Us"	Brock, Brown, Furtick, Joye, Matt Redman	9:06
8.	"Great Things (Worth It All)"	Carl Cartee, Furtick	4:54
9.	"Standing"	Brown, Furtick, Joye	3:42
10.	"Let Us Adore"	Brock, Brown, Furtick, Jason Ingram, Joye	4:12
11.	"I Love You Lord"	Brown, Amy Corbett, Furtick, Joye	5:23
12.	"For the Lamb"	Brown, Furtick	7:19
13.	"Fortress"	Brock, Brown, Furtick, London Gatch, Joy, Lauren Ramkissoon	4:53
14.	"Look How He Lifted Me"	Brown, Furtick, Israel Houghton	4:25
Total length:			73:46

== Chart performance ==
Chart (2014)	Peak position
US Billboard 200	58
US Christian Albums (Billboard)	1
