= Do It Again (Elevation Worship song) =

- EP cover

Single by Elevation Worship

from the album There Is a Cloud
- Released: February 23, 2018
- Recorded: September 9–21, 2016
- Genre: Worship; CCM
- Length: 6:38
- Label: Elevation Church; Provident Label Group
- Songwriters: Steven Furtick; Matt Redman; Chris Brown; Mack Brock
- Producers: Mack Brock; Aaron Robertson; Seth Mosley; Mike "X" O'Connor

Elevation Worship singles chronology
"O Come to the Altar" (2017)	"Do It Again" (2018)	"Won't Stop Now" (2018)

Music videos
- "Do It Again" (Live) on YouTube
- "Do It Again" (Acoustic) on YouTube
- "Do It Again" (Lyrics) on YouTube

"Do It Again" is a song performed by American contemporary worship band Elevation Worship. Written by Mack Brock, Chris Brown, Matt Redman and Steven Furtick, the song was released as the first single from their 2017 album There Is a Cloud. It was released to Christian radio on February 23, 2018. The song peaked at No. 6 on the US Hot Christian Songs chart, becoming their second Top 10 single from that chart. It is also the main track of the album Outra Vez, by the Brazilian praise group Diante do Trono. It lasted on the charts for 33 weeks, their second longest charting song. The song is played in a B-flat major key, and 172 beats per minute.

== Background ==
The earliest version of "Do It Again" was released on September 9, 2016, as part of the extended play titled Speak Revival. The live version of "Do It Again" was then released on February 17, 2018, during the pre-order period of There Is a Cloud, as the second promotional single of the album. It was recorded during the 12-day "Code Orange Revival" event in September 2016, held by Elevation Church at its Ballantyne campus in Charlotte, North Carolina. "Do It Again" impacted Christian radio on February 23, 2018, with an extended play containing the radio, live, reprise, acoustic and Spanish versions of the song released on the same day.

== Writing and development ==
Worship leaders and songwriters Mack Brock and Chris Brown had an interview with Kevin Davis in Reading, Pennsylvania for a 'Behind the Song' feature published on NewReleaseToday. Mack Brock shared that the song was inspired by a sermon titled "Don't Stop on 6" that Steven Furtick preached at a Hillsong Conference, whereby Matt Redman identified a song concept. Chris Brown, in relation to the song's takeaway message, said "We want people to know that God is faithful."

== Music videos ==
The lyric and acoustic videos of "Do It Again" was published on YouTube on September 30, 2016. The live music video of "Do It Again" which also includes the reprise, recorded at Elevation Church's Ballantyne campus in Charlotte, North Carolina was released on February 24, 2017, through YouTube. The lyric video of the song's Spanish version titled "Lo Harás Otra Vez (Do It Again)" was released on August 21, 2017, via YouTube. The live acoustic performance video of the song was then published on March 1, 2018 via YouTube.

== Track listing ==
Digital format — EP
No.	Title	Producer(s)	Length
1.	"Do It Again" (Radio)	Seth Mosley; Mike "X" O'Connor	4:05
2.	"Do It Again"	Mack Brock	6:38
3.	"Do It Again" (Reprise)	Mack Brock	3:30
4.	"Do It Again" (Acoustic)	Aaron Robertson	4:33
5.	"Lo Harás Otra Vez" (Do It Again)		6:17
Total length:			25:03

== Charts ==
=== Weekly charts ===
Chart (2016–18)	Peak position
US Hot Christian Songs (Billboard)	5
US Christian Airplay (Billboard)	3
US Christian AC (Billboard)	2
US Christian AC Indicator (Billboard)	6

=== Year-end charts ===
Chart (2017)	Position
US Christian Songs (Billboard)	62
Chart (2018)	Peak position
US Christian AC (Billboard)	5
US Christian Airplay (Billboard)	7
US Christian Songs (Billboard)	11

== Certifications ==
Region	Certification	Certified units/sales
New Zealand (RMNZ)	Gold	15,000^{‡}
United States (RIAA)	2× Platinum	2,000,000^{‡}
^{‡} Sales+streaming figures based on certification alone.

== Release history ==
Region	Date	Format	Label	Ref.
United States	February 23, 2018	Christian hot adult contemporary radio; Christian contemporary hit radio	Elevation Worship	
Various	February 23, 2018	Digital download (EP); streaming (EP)	Elevation Worship	
