= Kingdom Come (Elevation Worship album) =

Studio album by Elevation Worship
- Released: September 7, 2010
- Genre: Worship
- Length: 60:52
- Label: Elevation Worship

Elevation Worship chronology
God With Us (2009)	Kingdom Come (2010)	For the Honor (2011)

Singles from Kingdom Come
- 1. "Kingdom Come" Released: August 3, 2010

Kingdom Come is the fourth studio album from the American contemporary worship band Elevation Worship. The album was released on September 7, 2010 through its own imprint label, Elevation Worship. As of 2026, this is the band's most recent studio album. Moving forward, they began to release live albums.

== Singles ==
On August 3, 2010, the song "Kingdom Come" was released as the lead single for the album.

== Critical reception ==
Shannon Lewis, reviewing the album for Saint Lewis Music, stated that the album "fits firmly into Hillsong United / Planetshakers / Generation Unleashed / ALM: UK territory, and doesn't pull any surprises there." and that "I hear a great deal of musical talent - the potential is enormous - and there are hints of what they are capable of as songwriters." In a review by Daniel Lozano for CityLights Church, he stated that "Overall this is a pretty good album." and that "This album would probably be best for use during your devotional time or when you need some music to play while you are praying."

== Track listing ==
No.	Title	Writer(s)	Length
1.	"The Church"	Chris Brown, Mack Brock	4:58
2.	"Awaken"		4:54
3.	"Holy Is the One"		3:56
4.	"Kingdom Come"		6:06
5.	"Your Cross"		4:11
6.	"You Are On Our Side"		3:50
7.	"Give Me Faith"	Brown, London Gatch, Brock, Wade Joye	4:54
8.	"Sun Stand Still"		4:14
9.	"Let Us Remember"		0:59
10.	"Mercy Reigns"		4:08
11.	"We Are Forgiven"		4:32
12.	"Your Favor"		3:25
13.	"You Are Enough"		5:19
14.	"This City Is Yours"		5:26
Total length:			60:52

== Chart performance ==
Chart (2010)	Peak position
US Top Christian Albums (Billboard)	17
US Heatseekers Albums (Billboard)	5
US Independent Albums (Billboard)	42

== EP ==
Kingdom Come Remix EP

EP by Elevation Worship
- Released: October 26, 2010
- Recorded: 2010
- Genres: Worship, Christian EDM
- Length: 21:40
- Label: Elevation Worship
- Producers: Aaron Robertson, Joel Khouri, Brandon Willet

The Kingdom Come Remix EP consists of remixed renditions of select songs from Elevation's preceding release, Kingdom Come. The EP, consisting of five songs from the album that were remixed, was released on October 26, 2010 through its own imprint label as a free digital download. The remixes were done by Aaron Robertson, Joel Khouri and Brandon Willet (using the name Bwillackers). The EP was then shared on the video-sharing website, Vimeo, in March 2011.

No.	Title	Length
1.	"Sun Stand Still" (Aaron Robertson Remix)	4:05
2.	"The Church" (Joel Khouri Remix)	4:16
3.	"Awaken" (Aaron Robertson Remix)	4:38
4.	"You Are On Our Side" (Aaron Robertson Remix)	3:43
5.	"Your Cross" (Bwillackers Remix)	4:58
Total length:		21:40
