= Only King Forever =

Live album by Elevation Worship
- Released: January 14, 2014
- Recorded: July 19, 2013
- Venue: Elevation Church Blakeney, Charlotte, North Carolina, U.S.
- Genre: Worship
- Length: 79:01
- Label: Essential
- Producer: Mack Brock

Elevation Worship chronology
Nothing Is Wasted (2013)	Only King Forever (2014)	Wake Up the Wonder (2014)

Only King Forever is the third live album from Elevation Worship recorded at Elevation Blakeney. Essential Worship released the album on January 14, 2014. They worked with Mack Brock in the production of this album.

== Critical reception ==
Professional ratings
Review scores
Source	Rating
AllMusic	4/5 stars
Louder Than the Music	4.5/5 stars
New Release Today	3.5/5 stars
Worship Leader	4.5/5 stars

David Jeffries, giving the album four stars from AllMusic states, "with the live set running just under 80 minutes with every epic allowed plenty of room to stretch, this is Elevation's best to date, winning in both the categories of quality and quantity." Awarding the album three stars at Worship Leader, Jeremy Armstrong, describes, "the most consistent, high quality, congregational music in the American sonic landscape." Dawn Teresa, rating the album three and a half stars by New Release Today says, "With Only King Forever, Elevation Worship presents a packed-full record... Elevation Worship ultimately falls just short of lifting off." In a four and a half star review in Louder Than the Music, Jono Davies writes, "most importantly, this release leads you to Jesus."

== Awards and accolades ==
The album was No. 14 on the Worship Leader's Top 20 Albums of 2014 list.

The song, "Only King Forever", was No. 5 on the Worship Leader's Top 20 Songs of 2014 list.

== Track listing ==
No.	Title	Writer(s)	Length
1.	"Only King Forever"	Mack Brock, Chris Brown, Pastor Steven Furtick, Wade Joye	4:57
2.	"Glory Is Yours"	Carl Cartee, Furtick	4:16
3.	"I Will Look Up"	Brock, Brown, Jason Ingram, Joye, Matt Redman	6:00
4.	"Grace So Glorious"	Brown, Furtick, Israel Houghton	6:47
5.	"Grace So Glorious (Reprise)"	Brown, Furtick, Houghton	2:39
6.	"The Love of Jesus(featuring Darlene Zschech)"	Brock, Brown, Joye	6:02
7.	"Last Word"	Brock, Brown, Furtick, London Gatch, Joye	5:34
8.	"Mighty Warrior"	Brown, Matthews Ntlele, Jane Williams	4:57
9.	"I Will Sing"	Brock, Brown, Joye, Paul Mabury	5:08
10.	"Everlasting Father"	Brock, Brown, Gatch, Joye	6:51
11.	"Blessed Assurance"	Brock, Brown, Fanny Crosby, Phoebe Palmer Knapp	7:18
12.	"Great and Mighty King"	Brown, Zachary Kale, Brett Younker	5:19
13.	"Unto Your Name"	Brock, Brown, Furtick, Gatch, Joye	5:46
14.	"Raised to Life"	Brock, Brown, Furtick, Redman	7:27
Total length:			79:01

== Chart performance ==
Chart (2014)	Peak position
US Billboard 200	23
US Top Christian Albums (Billboard)	2
