= Hallelujah Here Below =

Live album by Elevation Worship

Live album by Elevation Worship
- Released: September 28, 2018
- Recorded: March 2018
- Venue: Elevation Ballantyne, Charlotte, North Carolina, US
- Genre: Worship; CCM
- Length: 76:07
- Label: Elevation Church
- Producer: Chris Brown; Aaron Robertson

Elevation Worship live album chronology
There Is a Cloud (2017)	Hallelujah Here Below (2018)	Graves Into Gardens (2020)

Elevation Worship chronology
Lo Harás Otra Vez (2018)	Hallelujah Here Below (2018)	Aleluya (En La Tierra) (2019)

Singles from Hallelujah Here Below
- 1. "Won't Stop Now" Released: August 3, 2018; 2. "Here Again" Released: August 17, 2018; 3. "Echo" Released: August 31, 2018; 4. "Hallelujah Here Below" Released: September 14, 2018; 5. "Here Comes Heaven" Released: November 30, 2018

Hallelujah Here Below is the seventh live album by American contemporary worship band Elevation Worship. It was released by Elevation Church on September 28, 2018.

Hallelujah Here Below was nominated for the 2019 Grammy Award for Best Contemporary Christian Music Album.

== Background ==
The album was recorded over a night in March 2018 at Elevation Church's Ballantyne campus in Charlotte, North Carolina, where previous Elevation Worship projects have been recorded. The Christian Beat noted the album consists of "honest confessions of brokenness mixed with soaring declarations of faith". Member Chris Brown said the album is about "how God doesn't ask for perfect praise", further stating:

We wonder what He could possibly want with our messy, dysfunctional lives. Because, after all, He's got a chorus of angels worshipping Him, singing endless and perfect praises around his throne in heaven day and night. And yet, I believe our King still loves the sound of the hallelujahs that come from broken, imperfect, but redeemed people here on earth. Our prayer is that this album would be a gate into His presence that helps usher in an atmosphere of worship in our lives.

== Promotion ==
The first single, "Won't Stop Now", was released as an instant grat to those who pre-ordered the album on iTunes. Brown said the song is about "believing that our best days are ahead of us. And what God has planned for us is immeasurably more than we imagine." The band also announced the Hallelujah Here Below Tour along with the album, which is set to visit the United States East Coast and Canada from October. "Here Again" was released as the second single in August 2018, and "Echo" featuring Tauren Wells became the third of four planned singles to precede the album when it was released in September. The title track was released as the fourth single on September 14, 2018.

== Critical reception ==
Professional ratings
Review scores
Source	Rating
Jesus Freak Hideout	3/5 stars

Alex Caldwell of Jesus Freak Hideout gave the album three out of five stars and called it a "mixed bag of tunes that mostly play it safe and stick to the well-established (and somewhat rote) formula of much of modern worship". Caldwell complimented lead single "Won't Stop Now" and the title track, and named "Echo" the standout track as its "rhythmic change here is a much needed directional turn from the sameness of much of the similar mid-temp rhythms and dynamics". In a review for New Release Today, Jasmin Patterson said the band has delivered an album that is "not only impactful spiritually but will also be a ton of fun to play and sing in personal or church worship settings". Patterson deemed the highlight a tie between "Echo" and "Then He Rose", calling "Echo" a song that "just connects with people and makes a heart come alive in worship" and "Then He Rose" a "powerful song about the resurrection of Jesus that would make a great addition to Easter setlists".

=== Accolades ===
Year-end lists
Publication	Accolade	Rank	Ref.
NewReleaseToday	Top 10 Worship Albums of 2018	8	

Awards
Year	Organization	Award	Result	Ref.
2019	We Love Christian Music Awards	The Chorus Award (Church Worship Album of the Year)	Nominated	
2019	Grammy Awards	Best Contemporary Christian Music Album	Nominated	

== Track listing ==
No.	Title	Writer(s)	Length
1.	"Won't Stop Now"	Chris Brown; Steven Furtick	7:04
2.	"God of the Promise"	Brown; Furtick; Aaron Robertson	4:07
3.	"Hallelujah Here Below"	Brown; Furtick	7:03
4.	"Here Again"	Brown; Furtick; Amy Corbett	6:45
5.	"Echo" (featuring Tauren Wells)	Furtick; Brown; Matthews Ntlele; Israel Houghton; Alexander Pappas	3:58
6.	"Worthy"	Brown; Mack Brock; Furtick	6:11
7.	"Mighty God (Another Hallelujah)"	Brown; Furtick	4:51
8.	"Power"	Brown; Furtick; Corbett	5:07
9.	"Then He Rose"	Chris Tomlin; Brown; Brock; Furtick	5:23
10.	"Greater Than Your Love"	Furtick; Brown; Brock; Israel Houghton	4:44
11.	"Faithful"	Furtick	5:34
12.	"Here Comes Heaven"	Furtick; Brown; Aaron Robertson	4:28
13.	"Still God"	Brown; Brock; Furtick	4:26
14.	"Better Word"	Brown; Furtick	6:28
Total length:			76:07

== Personnel ==
Adapted from AllMusic.

- Lizzy Abernerthy – background vocals
- Luke Andersen – drums
- Jenna Barrientes – vocals
- Jonsal Barrientes – vocals
- Vincent Baynard – drums
- Chris Brown – acoustic guitar, producer, vocal producer, vocals
- Elisa Cox – strings
- LaShawn Daniels – vocal producer
- Garrett Davis – editing, engineering
- Nick Edwards – bass
- Steven Furtick – executive producer
- Sam Gibson – mixing
- Tiffany Hammer – vocals
- Caroline Hardin – strings
- Everett Hardin – strings
- Brad Hudson – background vocals
- Ted Jensen – mastering
- David Liotta – acoustic guitar, guitar
- Matthew Melton – bass
- Harley Monette – background vocals
- Matthew Moore – background vocals
- Davide Mutendji – background vocals
- Lanesha Owens – background vocals
- Roseanna Parker – background vocals
- Justin Raines – bass
- Aaron Robertson – keyboards, producer, programming
- Anna Sailors – vocals
- Joey Signa – guitar
- Kevin Smith – guitar
- Lauren Wells – vocals
- Tauren Wells – featured artist
- Brittany Wilder – background vocals
- Jane Williams – background vocals

== Charts ==
=== Weekly charts ===
Chart (2018)	Peak position
Australian Albums (ARIA)	69
Canadian Albums (Billboard)	86
Dutch Albums (Album Top 100)	188
UK Album Downloads (OCC)	39
UK Christian & Gospel Albums (OCC)	1
US Billboard 200	25
US Christian Albums (Billboard)	2

=== Year-end charts ===
Chart (2018)	Position
US Christian Albums (Billboard)	47
Chart (2019)	Position
US Christian Albums (Billboard)	23
Chart (2020)	Position
US Christian Albums (Billboard)	30
Chart (2021)	Position
US Christian Albums (Billboard)	75
