= There Is a Cloud =

Live album by Elevation Worship
- Released: March 17, 2017
- Recorded: September 9–21, 2016
- Venue: Elevation Ballantyne, Charlotte, North Carolina, U.S.
- Genre: Worship; contemporary Christian music; Christian EDM; Christian rock
- Length: 75:39
- Label: Elevation Church; Provident Label Group
- Producer: Mack Brock; Aaron Robertson

Elevation Worship live album chronology
Here as in Heaven (2016)	There Is a Cloud (2017)	Lo Harás Otra Vez (2017)

Elevation Worship chronology
Speak Revival EP (2016)	There Is a Cloud (2017)	Lo Harás Otra Vez (2017)

Singles from There Is a Cloud
- 1. "Do It Again" Released: February 23, 2018

There Is a Cloud is the sixth live album (tenth album overall) by American contemporary worship band Elevation Worship. The album was released on March 17, 2017 by Elevation Church, alongside Provident Label Group.

There Is a Cloud was nominated for a GMA Dove Award in the Worship Album of the Year and the Long Form Video of the Year categories at the 48th Annual GMA Dove Awards, and the Top Christian Album Award at the 2018 Billboard Music Awards.

== Background ==
Elevation Worship recorded the album live during the 12-day "Code Orange Revival" event in September 2016, held by Elevation Church at its Ballantyne campus in Charlotte, North Carolina. In an interview with Herb Longs of The Christian Beat, Chris Brown and Mack Brock, founding members of Elevation Worship, were asked for insight into the title track "There Is a Cloud" and why the song represented the collection. Brown responded saying:

In 1 Kings there's a story about Elijah telling his servant to go look for a raincloud when the country had been in a drought for 3 years. And his servant comes back 6 times saying there's no sign of rain. But finally on the 7th time, he reports that he sees a small cloud rising out over the sea. And it felt like a great message to center our album around – that when we find ourselves in a season of drought, a season of waiting or of wondering when we'll see the harvest from what we've been sowing, we can trust that God is faithful, throughout it all! When God gives us a promise, it's no longer a matter of if, but when. A season of drought doesn't mean the death of a promise, only a delay. Cause what God promises, He'll always do. So this title track for the album is centered around the faithfulness of God.

– Chris Brown, The Christian Beat

== Promotion ==
The title track of the album, "There Is a Cloud", was released on January 13, 2017 as the first single, when the pre-order of the album began. "Do It Again" was released on February 17, 2017 during the pre-order period as the second single of the album.

== Singles ==
"Do It Again" was released as the first single from the album, having impacted Christian radio on February 23, 2018.

== Critical reception ==
Professional ratings
Review scores
Source	Rating
The Christian Beat	3.6/5 stars
NewReleaseToday	5/5 stars
Today's Christian Entertainment	4/5 stars

At The Christian Beat, Chris Major rated the album three-point-six stars out of five, concluding that " Many of the tracks have beautiful moments that captivate and inspire listeners, but the oversaturated nature of the album makes it hard for those moments to truly resonate." Rating the album a perfect five stars in a NewReleaseToday review, John Hisel believes that "In There Is A Cloud, Elevation Worship has created one of the best worship releases in recent memory," and concludes that "There Is A Cloud is full of songs that have the potential to be sung anywhere and everywhere, while always keeping the focus on Jesus," and that the album "could prove to be very influential throughout the praise and worship movement."

== Awards and accolades ==
On August 9, 2017, the Gospel Music Association was announced that There Is a Cloud would be nominated for a GMA Dove Award in the Worship Album of the Year and the Long Form Video of the Year categories at the 48th Annual GMA Dove Awards. On April 17, 2018, Billboard announced that the album was nominated for the Top Christian Album Award at the 2018 Billboard Music Awards.

== Commercial performance ==
In the week ending March 23, 2017, 34,000 equivalent album units of There Is a Cloud were sold. The album rose to No. 1 on the Billboard Christian Albums chart and No. 11 on the Billboard 200 chart dated April 8, 2017.

== Track listing ==
Standard edition
No.	Title	Writer(s)	Length
1.	"There Is a Cloud"	Chris Brown, Mack Brock, Steven Furtick	5:47
2.	"Overcome"	Furtick, Brown, Brock	4:00
3.	"Do It Again"	Furtick, Matt Redman, Brown, Brock	6:38
4.	"Do It Again (Reprise)"	Furtick, Redman, Brown, Brock	3:30
5.	"Fullness"	Furtick, Brown, Matthews Ntlele	6:41
6.	"He Is Lord"	Brown, Brock, Furtick, Wade Joye	4:40
7.	"Yours (Glory and Praise)"	Furtick, Brown, Brock	7:30
8.	"Uncontainable Love"	Furtick, London Gatch, Aaron Robertson	4:07
9.	"Forever I Run"	Brown, Jason Ingram, Brock, Furtick, Joye	5:23
10.	"None"	Brown, Brock, Furtick, Joye	5:50
11.	"Grateful"	Brown, Ntlele, Stefan Green, Furtick	4:06
12.	"Mighty Cross"	Jane Williams, Ingram, Ntlele, Furtick	6:16
13.	"Oh Sing"	Furtick, Gatch, Robertson	4:06
14.	"Here in the Presence"	Brown, Brock, Furtick	7:05
Total length:			75:39

Bonus tracks
No.	Title	Length
15.	"Do It Again" (acoustic)	4:33
16.	"Yours (Glory and Praise)" (acoustic)	4:55
17.	"Fullness" (acoustic)	4:25
Total length:		89:32

== Charts ==
=== Weekly charts ===
Chart (2017)	Peak position
Australian Albums (ARIA)	33
Canadian Albums (Billboard)	42
New Zealand Albums (RMNZ)	24
Swiss Albums (Schweizer Hitparade)	53
UK Christian & Gospel Albums (OCC)	10
US Billboard 200	11
US Top Christian Albums (Billboard)	1

=== Year-end charts ===
Chart (2017)	Position
US Christian Albums (Billboard)	11
Chart (2018)	Position
US Christian Albums (Billboard)	20
Chart (2019)	Position
US Christian Albums (Billboard)	35
Chart (2020)	Position
US Christian Albums (Billboard)	36
Chart (2021)	Position
US Christian Albums (Billboard)	64

== Release history ==
Region	Date	Version	Format	Label	Ref.
Various	March 17, 2017	Standard	CD	Provident Label Group	
Various	March 17, 2017	Standard	download; streaming	Elevation Church	
