= Here as in Heaven =

Live album by Elevation Worship
- Released: February 5, 2016
- Recorded: July 31, 2015
- Venue: Spectrum Center, Charlotte, North Carolina, USA
- Genre: Worship; Christian pop; Christian EDM; Christian rock
- Length: 79:23
- Label: Essential Worship; Provident Label Group
- Producer: Mack Brock; Aaron Robertson; Steven Furtick

Elevation Worship chronology
Wake Up the Wonder (2014)	Here as in Heaven (2016)	There Is a Cloud (2017)

Singles from Here as in Heaven
- 1. "O Come to the Altar" Released: February 23, 2017; 2. "Resurrecting" Released: December 26, 2018

Here as in Heaven is the fifth live album from Elevation Worship. It was recorded live at Time Warner Cable Arena in Charlotte, North Carolina, United States with more than 16,000 in attendance. Essential Worship released the album on February 5, 2016.

== Critical reception ==
Professional ratings
Review scores
Source	Rating
The Christian Beat	4/5 stars
New Release Today	4/5 stars
Worship Leader	4/5 stars

Awarding the album four stars at Worship Leader, Bobby Gilles writes, "Elevation directs us to worship with a sense of wonder and purpose, as we celebrate the gospel and carry out our mission on earth." Mark Ryan, rating the album four stars by New Release Today, states, "Live worship is the best worship, and with Here as in Heaven, Elevation Worship gives the church new songs to enter into that secret place." Giving the album four stars from The Christian Beat, Herb Longs describes, "Filled to the brim, Here As In Heaven is a mixture of high-energy praise, thought-provoking worship, uplifting encouragement, and enthusiastic celebration of God’s work."

== Awards and accolades ==
The album was nominated for a 2016 GMA Dove Award for Worship Album of the Year.

The song "O Come to the Altar" was No. 3 on the Worship Leader's Top 20 Songs of 2016 list.

== Track listing ==
No.	Title	Writer(s)	Length
1.	"Here as in Heaven"	Chris Brown, Mack Brock, Matthews Ntlele, Steven Furtick, Wade Joye	8:19
2.	"Grace like a Wave"	Brown, Brock, Furtick, Joye, Aaron Robertson, Jane Williams, Lauren Anderson, London Gatch	4:44
3.	"Call upon the Lord"	Brown, Furtick	5:21
4.	"O Come to the Altar"	Brown, Brock, Furtick, Joye	5:50
5.	"Resurrecting"	Brown, Brock, Ntlele, Furtick, Joye	7:47
6.	"Evidence"		5:12
7.	"Shine a Light"	Brown, Ntlele, Furtick, Williams	4:17
8.	"Yahweh"	Ntlele, Furtick, Williams	6:43
9.	"I Can't Believe"	Brown, Ntlele, Furtick, Stefan Green	5:45
10.	"First and Only"	Brown, Furtick, Joye	5:23
11.	"Praise Goes On"	Brown, Furtick, Joye	4:15
12.	"Hold on to Me"	Brown, Brock, Furtick	5:22
13.	"For a Moment"	Brown, Ntlele, Furtick, Williams	6:30
14.	"O Come to the Altar (Radio Version)"	Brown, Brock, Ntlele, Furtick, Joye	3:55
Total length:			79:23

== Chart performance ==
=== Weekly charts ===
Chart (2016)	Peak position
Australian Albums (ARIA)	27
Canadian Albums (Billboard)	58
New Zealand Albums (RMNZ)	32
US Billboard 200	15
US Top Christian Albums (Billboard)	1

=== Year-end charts ===
Chart (2016)	Position
US Christian Albums (Billboard)	17
Chart (2017)	Position
US Christian Albums (Billboard)	15
Chart (2018)	Position
US Christian Albums (Billboard)	13
Chart (2019)	Position
US Christian Albums (Billboard)	16
Chart (2020)	Position
US Christian Albums (Billboard)	17
Chart (2021)	Position
US Christian Albums (Billboard)	24
Chart (2022)	Position
US Christian Albums (Billboard)	35
Chart (2023)	Position
US Christian Albums (Billboard)	43
Chart (2025)	Position
US Christian Albums (Billboard)	43

== Certifications ==
Region	Certification	Certified units/sales
New Zealand (RMNZ)	Gold	7,500^{‡}
United States (RIAA)	Gold	500,000^{‡}
^{‡} Sales+streaming figures based on certification alone.
