= Nothing Is Wasted (album) =

Live album by Elevation Worship
- Released: February 18, 2013
- Recorded: July 20, 2012
- Venue: Elevation Blakeney, Charlotte, NC
- Genre: Worship
- Length: 77:42
- Label: Provident Label Group

Elevation Worship chronology
For the Honor (2011)	Nothing Is Wasted (2013)	Only King Forever (2014)

Nothing Is Wasted is the second live album from the American contemporary worship band Elevation Worship recorded at Elevation Blakeney. The album was released on February 18, 2013 by Provident Label Group.

== Critical reception ==
Professional ratings
Review scores
Source	Rating
AllMusic	4/5 stars
Louder Than The Music	4.5/5 stars

AllMusic's Steve Legget rated the album five stars, calling it "a success on both a spiritual and commercial level". Jono Davies of Louder Than The Music gave the album four and a half stars out of five, saying that "This concept is a great idea. Sometimes live albums aren't the most creative of albums, but when a song is taken into the studio you can spend time working out different sounds and styles to create the definitive version. So depending on the mood you are in, you can experience this album in two different styles." with reference to the deluxe edition of Nothing Is Wasted which contained studio versions of the songs as well. Davies concluded that the deluxe edition is "A great double album, with great worship songs performed in two very different ways."

== Track listing ==
Standard edition
No.	Title	Writer(s)	Length
1.	"Great In Us" (Live)	Mack Brock, Chris Brown, Katelyn Clampett, Brad Hudson, Wade Joye, Jane Williams	6:41
2.	"Be Lifted High" (Live)	Brock, Brown, Jess Cates, Joye, Williams	5:17
3.	"In Your Presence" (Live)	Brock, Brown, Steven Furtick, London Gatch, Joye, Williams	6:14
4.	"Let Go" (Live)	Brock, Brown, Cates, Joye	4:41
5.	"We're Not Alone" (Live)	Brock, Brown, London Gatch, Brad Hudson, Joye, Williams	4:11
6.	"I Will Trust in You" (Live)	Brock, Brown, Joye	6:46
7.	"Unchanging God" (Live)	Brock, Brown, Cates, Furtick, Gatch, Joye, Williams	7:52
8.	"Nothing Is Wasted" (Live)	Brock, Brown, Cates, Furtick, Gatch, Jason Ingram, Joye	6:36
9.	"I Have Decided" (Live)	Brock, Brown, Joye, Sadhu Sundar Singh	7:13
10.	"Lift Us Out" (Live)	Brock, Brown, Furtick, Gatch, Joye	4:44
11.	"Open Up Our Eyes" (Live)	Brock, Brown, Stuart Garrard, Gatch, Joye	4:38
12.	"Greater" (Live)	Brock, Brown, Furtick, Israel Houghton, Joye	8:39
13.	"Give Me Faith" (Bonus Track)	Brock, Brown, Gatch, Joye	4:14
Total length:			77:42

Deluxe edition
No.	Title	Writer(s)	Length
1.	"Great In Us" (Live)	Mack Brock, Chris Brown, Katelyn Clampett, Brad Hudson, Wade Joye, Jane Williams	6:41
2.	"Be Lifted High" (Live)	Brock, Brown, Jess Cates, Joye, Williams	5:17
3.	"In Your Presence" (Live)	Brock, Brown, Steven Furtick, London Gatch, Joye, Williams	6:14
4.	"Let Go" (Live)	Brock, Brown, Cates, Joye	4:41
5.	"We're Not Alone" (Live)	Brock, Brown, London Gatch, Brad Hudson, Joye, Williams	4:11
6.	"I Will Trust in You" (Live)	Brock, Brown, Joye	6:46
7.	"Unchanging God" (Live)	Brock, Brown, Cates, Furtick, Gatch, Joye, Williams	7:52
8.	"Nothing Is Wasted" (Live)	Brock, Brown, Cates, Furtick, Gatch, Jason Ingram, Joye	6:36
9.	"I Have Decided" (Live)	Brock, Brown, Joye, Sadhu Sundar Singh	7:13
10.	"Lift Us Out" (Live)	Brock, Brown, Furtick, Gatch, Joye	4:44
11.	"Open Up Our Eyes" (Live)	Brock, Brown, Stuart Garrard, Gatch, Joye	4:38
12.	"Greater" (Live)	Brock, Brown, Furtick, Israel Houghton, Joye	8:39
13.	"Great In Us"	Mack Brock, Chris Brown, Katelyn Clampett, Brad Hudson, Wade Joye, Jane Williams	6:39
14.	"Be Lifted High"	Brock, Brown, Jess Cates, Joye, Williams	5:06
15.	"In Your Presence"	Brock, Brown, Furtick, London Gatch, Joye, Williams	4:59
16.	"Let Go"	Brock, Brown, Cates, Joye	4:52
17.	"We're Not Alone"	Brock, Brown, London Gatch, Brad Hudson, Joye, Williams	4:12
18.	"I Will Trust in You"	Brock, Brown, Joye	7:37
19.	"Unchanging God"	Brock, Brown, Cates, Furtick, Gatch, Joye, Williams	5:39
20.	"Nothing Is Wasted"	Brock, Brown, Cates, Furtick, Gatch, Ingram, Joye	5:31
21.	"I Have Decided"	Brock, Brown, Joye, Sadhu Sundar Singh	5:01
22.	"Lift Us Out"	Brock, Brown, Furtick, Gatch, Joye	3:53
23.	"Open Up Our Eyes"	Brock, Brown, Stuart Garrard, Gatch, Joye	4:38
24.	"Greater"	Brock, Brown, Furtick, Houghton, Joye	6:20
25.	"Give Me Faith" (Bonus Track)	Brock, Brown, Gatch, Joye	6:20
Total length:			141:44

== Chart performance ==
Chart (2013)	Peak position
US Billboard 200	41
US Christian Albums (Billboard)	1
