= O Come to the Altar =

Single by Elevation Worship

from the album Here as in Heaven
- Released: February 24, 2017
- Genre: Worship
- Label: Elevation
- Songwriters: Chris Brown; Mack Brock; Steven Furtick; Wade Joye
- Producer: Seth Mosley

Elevation Worship singles chronology
"Unstoppable God" (2015)	"O Come to the Altar" (2017)	"Do It Again" (2018)

"O Come to the Altar" is a song by American worship group Elevation Worship. It was released on February 24, 2017, as the lead single from their fifth live album, Here as in Heaven (2016). The song was written by Chris Brown, Mack Brock, Steven Furtick, and Wade Joye. The song peaked at No. 2 on the Hot Christian Songs chart, their highest-charting entry. It stayed there for a record total of sixteen weeks, blocked by Lecrae's "I'll Find You" and Hillsong Worship's "What a Beautiful Name".

== Track listing ==
Extended play
No.	Title	Length
1.	"O Come to the Altar"	5:53
2.	"O Come to the Altar" (Radio Version)	3:55
3.	"O Come to the Altar" (Acoustic)	5:10
4.	"Ven Ante Su Trono (O Come to the Altar)"	5:47
5.	"O Come to the Altar" (Instrumental)	3:29

== Charts ==
=== Weekly charts ===
Chart (2016–17)	Peak position
US Hot Christian Songs (Billboard)	2
US Christian Airplay (Billboard)	2

=== Year-end charts ===
Chart (2016)	Peak position
US Christian Songs (Billboard)	50

Chart (2017)	Peak position
US Christian Songs (Billboard)	6
US Christian Airplay (Billboard)	11
US Christian AC (Billboard)	9

Chart (2018)	Peak position
US Christian Songs (Billboard)	19

=== Decade-end charts ===
Chart (2010s)	Position
US Christian Songs (Billboard)	23

== Release history ==
Region	Date	Format	Label	Ref.
United States	February 24, 2017	Christian radio	Elevation	
Worldwide	October 6, 2017	Digital download (Extended play)	Elevation	

== Certifications ==
Region	Certification	Certified units/sales
New Zealand (RMNZ)	Platinum	30,000^{‡}
United States (RIAA)	3× Platinum	3,000,000^{‡}
^{‡} Sales+streaming figures based on certification alone.
