= Elevation Worship =

Contemporary worship music band

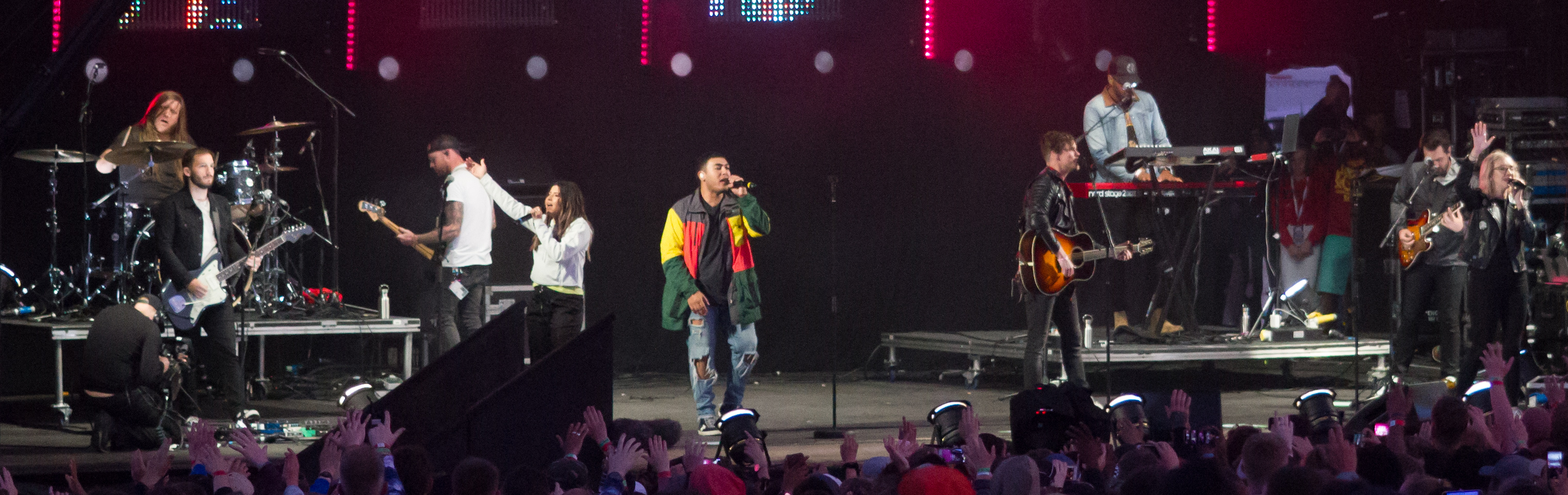
- Elevation Worship performing in October 2019 at Big Church Day Out at Wiston House, Wiston, England

Background information
- Origin: Charlotte, North Carolina, U.S.
- Genre: Contemporary worship music
- Works: Elevation Worship discography
- Years active: 2007–present
- Label: Essential · Elevation Worship Records
- Spinoffs: Elevation Rhythm; Elevation Living Room
- Members: Chris Brown; Jonsal Barrientes; Jenna Barrientes; Tiffany Hudson; Isaiah Templeton; Davide Mutendji; E. Edwards
- Past members: Mack Brock; London Gatch; Matthews Ntlele; Anna Sailors Pinkham; Jane Williams
- Website: elevationworship.com

Elevation Worship is a contemporary worship music collective from Elevation Church in Charlotte, North Carolina. The collective leads worship in weekend church services at Elevation Church, as well as performing concerts and tours around the United States. The collective has sold over 1.5 million albums in the United States.

== History ==
=== Independent albums (2007–2010) ===
Elevation Worship began in 2007 at Elevation Church in Charlotte. The band released four independent albums prior to signing with Essential Records. The Sound was released in 2007 (under the name Elevation Church Live), We Are Alive in 2008, God With Us in 2009, and Kingdom Come in 2010. Featuring the song "Give Me Faith", Kingdom Come was the band's first album to break through on the Billboard charts, reaching No. 5 on Heatseekers, No. 42 on Independent Albums and at No. 17 on the Christian Albums chart.

=== 2010s ===
The band released their debut live album, For the Honor, under Sony Music Nashville's Essential Records label on November 21, 2011. It had chart success on Billboard magazine charts including No. 1 on Heatseekers, No. 19 on the Christian Albums, and the Billboard 200 at No. 193. The band's second album with the Essential label, Nothing Is Wasted, was released on February 19, 2013. A deluxe edition of the album also included studio recordings of each song. It reached No. 1 on the Christian Albums chart and was No. 41 on the Billboard 200.

Their seventh album, Only King Forever, was released on January 14, 2014, debuting at their highest charting position, No. 23 on the Billboard 200 and featured guest vocalist Darlene Zschech from Hillsong Worship. The band released their eighth album, Wake Up The Wonder, on November 25, 2014. It was recorded at the Spectrum Center in Charlotte on August 1, and it debuted at No. 58 on the Billboard 200 in its first week. Additionally it was No. 1 on Billboard's Christian Album chart. On July 31, 2015, another live recording was made at the same venue (Time Warner Cable Arena) for their ninth album, Here as in Heaven. It was their first album released on their own label, Elevation Worship Records. It was released on February 5, 2016, and peaked No. 1 on US album charts. Their tenth album, There Is a Cloud, was released on March 17, 2017, after being recorded at Elevation Ballantyne during a revival, "Code Orange Revival". After There is a Cloud, Elevation Worship released their first Spanish album, Lo Harás Otra Vez, on August 18, 2017. The album peaked at No. 2 on the US Latin album chart.

In June 2017, Mack Brock, a founding member of Elevation, left when he felt called elsewhere and signed a solo contract with Capitol Records’ Sparrow imprint. On September 28, 2018, Elevation Worship released their eleventh live album, Hallelujah Here Below, which was nominated for the 2019 Best Contemporary Christian Music Album. In 2019, Elevation Worship released the album Paradoxology on April 12, which features rearrangements of some songs from Hallelujah Here Below. Paradoxology included a single, "With You". The collective's second Spanish album Aleluya (En La Tierra) was released on July 19. It peaked at No. 8 on the US Latin Album Sales chart. At Midnight, their seventh EP, was released on August 30.

=== 2020s ===
Graves Into Gardens, the group's twelfth album, was released on May 1, 2020. The album debuted at No. 1 on Billboard's Christian albums chart and No. 34 on the Billboard 200. In 2021, the collective collaborated with Maverick City Music on their album Old Church Basement, which was released on April 30. Old Church Basement debuted at No. 1 on Billboard's Christian Albums chart and No. 30 on the Billboard 200. Elevation Worship's 2022 live album, Lion, was released on March 4, and debuted at No. 2 on the Billboard Christian Albums chart and No. 80 on the Billboard 200.

The collective released their 2023 live album, Can You Imagine?, on May 19, which debuted at the top of the Billboard Top Christian Albums chart on June 3. The group went on the Praise Party tour in July and August of 2024. Their 2024 live album, When Wind Meets Fire, was released on July 12th.

== Members ==
Current members include:

- Chandler Moore
- Chris Brown
- Jonsal Barrientes
- Jenna Barrientes
- Tiffany Hudson
- Davide Mutendji
- Isaiah Templeton
- Shae Wooton
- Otis Williams
- Dominik Geralds
- Vincent Baynard
- Joey Signa
- Josh Holiday
- L. J. Mitchell
- E. Edwards
- Scott Gardner Jr.

=== Former ===
- Mack Brock
- London Gatch
- Matthews Ntlele
- Anna Sailors Pinkham
- Jane Williams

== Discography ==
- The Sound (2007)
- We Are Alive (2008)
- God With Us (2009)
- Kingdom Come (2010)

== Awards and nominations ==
As of 2024 the group has received one Grammy Award and 8 Dove Awards. In November 2024, Christian dating app SALT conducted a survey of 109,000 SALT users, and found that fans of Elevation Worship had the 5th most liked dating profiles amongst Christian singles globally.

=== American Music Awards ===
Year	Nominee / work	Award	Result
2021	Elevation Worship	Favorite Artist – Contemporary Inspirational	Nominated

=== BET Awards ===
Year	Nominee / work	Award	Result	Ref.
2022	"Jireh" (with Maverick City Music)	Dr. Bobby Jones Best Gospel/Inspirational Award	Nominated	

=== Billboard Music Awards ===
Year	Nominee / work	Award	Result
2018	Elevation Worship	Top Christian Artist	Nominated
2018	There Is a Cloud	Top Christian Album	Nominated
2018	"O Come to the Altar"	Top Christian Song	Nominated
2020	Elevation Worship	Top Christian Artist	Nominated
2021	Elevation Worship	Top Christian Artist	Won
2021	Graves into Gardens	Top Christian Album	Nominated
2021	"Graves into Gardens" (featuring Brandon Lake)	Top Christian Song	Won
2021	"The Blessing" (with Kari Jobe and Cody Carnes)	Top Christian Song	Nominated
2022	Elevation Worship	Top Christian Artist	Nominated
2022	Elevation Worship	Top Gospel Artist	Nominated
2022	Old Church Basement (with Maverick City Music)	Top Christian Album	Nominated
2022	Old Church Basement (with Maverick City Music)	Top Gospel Album	Nominated
2022	"Jireh" (with Maverick City Music featuring Chandler Moore and Naomi Raine)	Top Gospel Song	Nominated

=== GMA Dove Awards ===
Year	Nominee / work	Award	Result
2015	Wake Up the Wonder	Long Form Video of the Year	Nominated
2016	Here as in Heaven	Worship Album of the Year	Nominated
2017	"O Come to the Altar"	Song of the Year	Nominated
2017	"O Come to the Altar"	Worship Song of the Year	Nominated
2017	There Is a Cloud	Worship Album of the Year	Nominated
2017	There Is a Cloud Live	Long Form Video of the Year	Nominated
2018	"Do It Again"	Worship Song of the Year	Nominated
2019	Hallelujah Here Below	Worship Album of the Year	Nominated
2019	Hallelujah Here Below	Recorded Music Packaging of the Year	Nominated
2020	"See a Victory"	Song of the Year	Nominated
2020	Aleluya (En La Tierra)	Spanish Language Album of the Year	Won
2020	"The Blessing (Live)" (with Kari Jobe and Cody Carnes)	Worship Recorded Song of the Year	Won
2020	At Midnight	Worship Album of the Year	Nominated
2021	Graves into Gardens (featuring Brandon Lake)	Song of the Year	Nominated
2021	"The Blessing" (with Kari Jobe and Cody Carnes)	Song of the Year	Won
2021	Elevation Worship	Artist of the Year	Nominated
2021	"Tumbas A Jardines" (featuring Brandon Lake)	Spanish Language Recorded Song of the Year	Nominated
2021	"Graves into Gardens" (featuring Brandon Lake)	Worship Recorded Song of the Year	Won
2021	"Jireh" (with Maverick City Music featuring Chandler Moore and Naomi Raine)	Worship Recorded Song of the Year	Nominated
2021	Graves into Gardens	Worship Album of the Year	Nominated
2021	Old Church Basement (with Maverick City Music)	Worship Album of the Year	Won
2021	Graves into Gardens	Recorded Music Packaging of the Year	Won
2022	Lion	Worship Album of the Year	Won
2022	Lion	Recorded Music Packaging of the Year	Nominated
2025	When Wind Meets Fire	Worship Album of the Year	Won
2025	"I Know a Name"	Worship Recorded Song of the Year	Won
2026	"God I'm Just Grateful"	Song of the Year	Pending
2026	"I Know a Name"	Song of the Year	Pending
2026	"God I'm Just Grateful"	Worship Recorded Song of the Year	Pending
2026	So Be It	Worship Album of the Year	Pending

=== Grammy Awards ===
Year	Nominee / work	Award	Result	Ref.
2019	Hallelujah Here Below	Best Contemporary Christian Music Album	Nominated	
2021	"The Blessing" (with Kari Jobe and Cody Carnes)	Best Contemporary Christian Music Performance/Song	Nominated	
2022	"Wait on You" (with Maverick City Music)	Best Gospel Performance/Song	Nominated	
2022	"Jireh" (with Maverick City Music featuring Chandler Moore and Naomi Raine)	Best Contemporary Christian Music Performance/Song	Nominated	
2022	Old Church Basement (with Maverick City Music)	Best Contemporary Christian Music Album	Won	
2023	Lion	Best Contemporary Christian Music Album	Nominated	
2026	"I Know a Name"	Best Contemporary Christian Music Performance/Song	Nominated	
2027	"God I'm Just Grateful"	Best Contemporary Christian Music Performance/Song	Nominated	

=== K-Love Fan Awards ===
Year	Nominee / work	Award	Result	Ref.
2026	"Alleluia"	Worship Song of the Year	Nominated	
2026	Elevation Worship	Artist of the Year	Nominated	
2026	Elevation Worship	Group of the Year	Nominated	
