= Elevation Church =

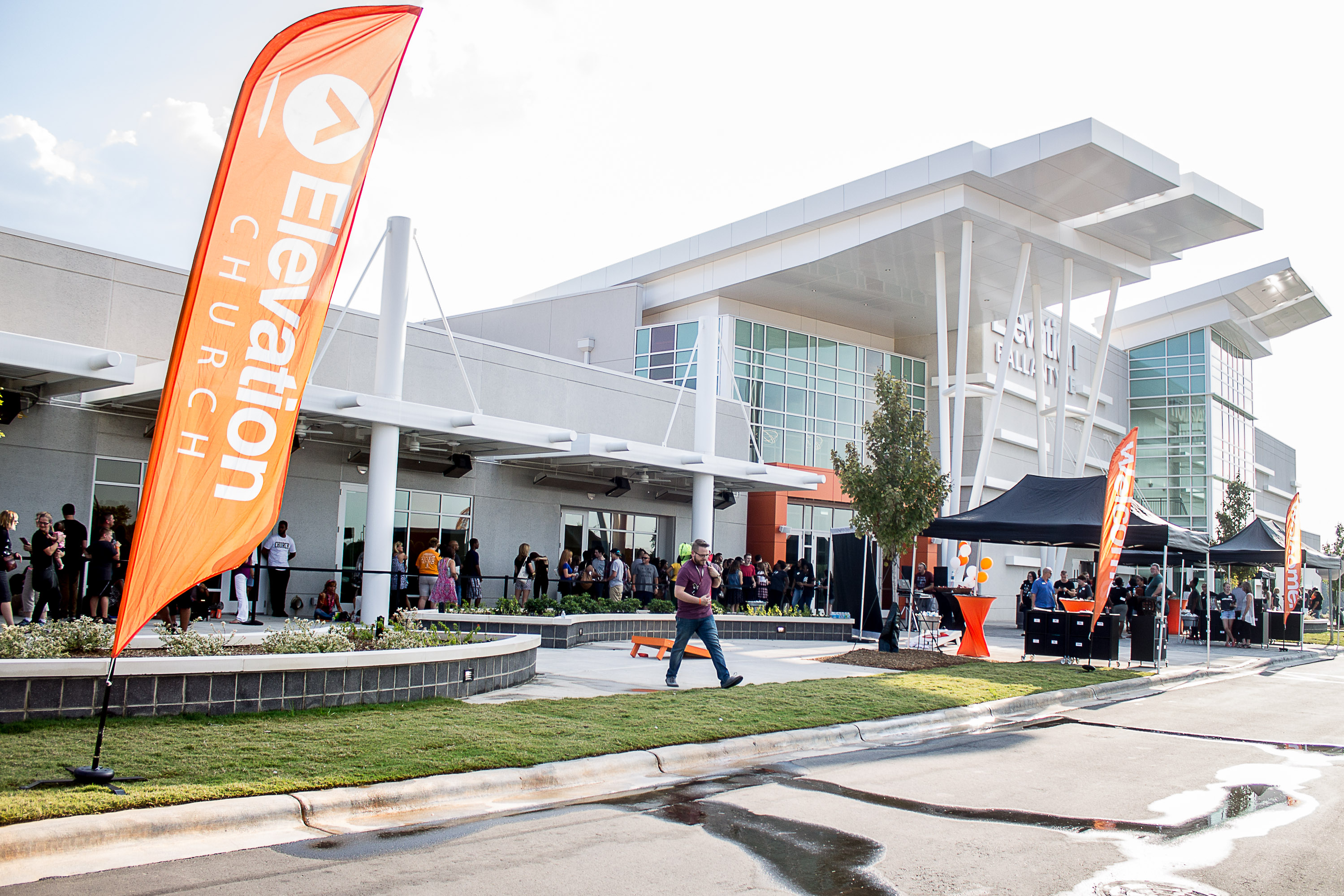
- Elevation Ballantyne
- Location: Charlotte, North Carolina
- Country: United States
- Denomination: Non-denominational
- Previous denomination: Southern Baptist
- Website: elevationchurch.org

History
- Founded: February 2006

Elevation Church is an Evangelical non-denominational multi-site megachurch based in Charlotte, North Carolina. Weekly church attendance was 17,061 people in 20 campuses in 2025. Its senior pastors are Steven Furtick and Holly Furtick.

== History ==
The church began as a church plant of the Baptist State Convention of North Carolina. Steven Furtick and seven other families from Christ Covenant Church in Shelby, North Carolina, relocated to Charlotte, North Carolina, meeting in Providence High School. On February 5, 2006, the first Sunday worship service, 121 people attended. In 2007, it founded the music group Elevation Worship. By 2013, the church's regular attendance had grown to nearly 15,000 people weekly. In 2016, it dedicated a new main building in Ballantyne including a 1,800-seat auditorium that is equipped with elevators. In 2015 and 2017, the church was listed by the Fortune magazine as one of the 100 Best Workplaces for Young Millennials in the United States, particularly for the competence of managers, appreciation of colleagues and diversity. In 2018, CBS News ranked Elevation Church as the ninth largest megachurch in the United States with about 22,000 weekly visitors. In June 2023, a few days after the Southern Baptist Convention passed a proposed constitutional amendment that would not allow churches that have female pastors to be members, it terminated its membership with the Convention, without specifying the reason.

According to a 2025 church census, it claimed a weekly attendance of 17,061 people and 20 campuses in different cities.

== Beliefs ==
The Church has a Baptist confession of faith. The Church believes the Bible to be inerrant and inspired. They also believe in Trinitarianism.

== Outreach ==
Since 2006, Elevation Church has given more than $10 million. In 2011, a partnership with Charlotte Mayor Anthony Foxx was established to give 100,000 hours and $750,000 to serve Charlotte people in "The Orange Initiative." In 2012, the church completed The Orange Initiative with over 102,000 hours served.

In 2008, Elevation Church gave out $40,000 to members, in envelopes filled with $5, $20, even $1,000, and told them to spend it kindly on others.

In 2012, Elevation Church launched an initiative calling for members to mentor children for the 2012–2013 school year, with over 1,600 responding. The school outreach program was criticized in local LGBT media, with some former LGBTQ members of the church saying that they were discriminated against and that the church’s policies on LGBTQ rights are too vague. As an affiliate of the Southern Baptist Convention, the church is prohibited from acting to “affirm, approve, or endorse homosexual behavior.”

In 2020, Elevation Church partnered with NASCAR driver Joey Logano through his foundation to establish a $1 million COVID-19 Response and Recovery Fund. Elevation also collaborated with the Food Bank of Central and Eastern North Carolina, giving away 17,000 meals to people in need during the COVID-19 pandemic.

=== Love week ===
Since 2010, Elevation Church has hosted a week-long outreach called "Love Week". During the church's 2010 "Love Week", Elevation members packed more than 10,000 sandwiches for the homeless, helped single mothers get their cars serviced, donated blood, cleaned up parks and streets, built a soccer field for local ministries and renovated buildings. In 2011, Elevation and over 25 other local churches served more than 34,000 hours in a single week. In 2012, Elevation partnered with 31 other churches to serve 62 outreach organizations for a total of 50,340 hours around the city of Charlotte, N.C. Elevation also partnered with Presbyterian Hospital-Matthews to help fund enhancements and expansion at a local free clinic. During Elevation's 2021 Love Week, the church had 22,651 volunteers help for a total of 47,465 hours, serving 314 organizations with 1,588 total events. Elevation Church donated US$1.6 million to outreach partners, while the volunteers made 2,200 baby care kits, 5,600 dignity kits for women and teens, 21,000 backpacks for students, and distributed 30,900 snack packs.

== Spontaneous baptisms ==
In 2014, Elevation Church was criticized over its so-called "spontaneous baptism" services, which often rendered several hundred to several thousand in a given week. Much of the basis for the criticisms related to a manual produced by church leadership, entitled "Spontaneous Baptism How-To Guide." It included various logistics involved to support such spontaneous baptisms, as well as the practice of selecting volunteers to be the first to respond to a call of baptism.

In response to the coverage, Steven Furtick replied in a sermon that "'I'm Too Scared of God' to Manipulate Baptisms." Elevation Church also released a statement, underscoring, "We are confident that those who attend Elevation Church know and understand our mission and vision for reaching people for Jesus Christ. As attendees, they are provided, through weekly teachings, biblical context for everything we do and practice, such as baptism, giving, serving and inviting friends to church."

== Board of Overseers ==
Elevation Church has a board of overseers that are composed of out-of-town pastors who advise Furtick and his staff on their ministry and decide Furtick's salary. In 2012, former The Healing Place Church pastor Dino Rizzo joined the board, but resigned after one month. He would later join the Church of the Highlands. He would also become a staff member of the Association of Related Churches.

As of 2016, the board includes:

- Pastor Jack Graham of Prestonwood Baptist in Plano, TX
- Pastor Kevin Gerald of Champions Centre in Seattle, WA
- Pastor Stovall Weems formerly of Celebration Church in Jacksonville, FL
- Pastor Perry Noble formerly of NewSpring Church in Anderson, SC

== See also ==
- List of the largest evangelical churches
- List of the largest evangelical church auditoriums
