= Brighter Days =

Brighter Days may refer to:

- Brighter Days (Blessing Offor album), 2022
- Brighter Days, an album by Curtis Stigers, 1999
- Brighter Days (Dwight Yoakam album), 2024
- Brighter Days, an album by Robert Randolph and the Family Band, 2019
- Brighter Days (Sigala album), 2018
- "Brighter Days"/"Tin Roof", a two-track single by Blessing Offor, 2021
- "Brighter Days", a 2022 song by Emeli Sandé from the album Let's Say for Instance
- "Brighter Days", a 1992 song by Green Velvet and Dajae
- "Brighter Days", a 2011 song by John Snow which was formerly lostwave
- "Brighter Days", a 2009 song by Leeland
- "Brighter Days", a 2018 song by San Holo featuring Bipolar Sunshine
- "Brighter Days", a 2014 song by Taylor Henderson from the album Burnt Letters
- "Brighter Days (Are Before Us)", a 2021 song by Meet Me at the Altar

== See also ==
- Brighter Daze, a 2015 studio album by Murs & 9th Wonder
- Brighter Day (disambiguation)
