= So Be It =

So Be It may refer to:

- So Be It (album), by Elevation Worship, 2026
  - "So Be It" (Elevation Worship song), the album's title track
- "So Be It" (Clipse song), 2025
- "So Be It" (Lisa Stansfield song), 2014
- "So Be It", a song by Solange from the 2002 album Solo Star
