= Alleluia (Elevation Worship song) =

2026 Single by Elevation Worship, Chandler Moore, and Chris Brown

- Radio version cover

Promotional single by Elevation Worship, Chandler Moore, and Chris Brown

from the album So Be It
- Released: February 5, 2026
- Recorded: September 2025
- Genre: Contemporary worship
- Length: 4:24
- Label: Elevation Worship Records
- Songwriters: Benjamin William Hastings; Chandler Moore; Steven Furtick
- Producers: Moore; Chris Brown; Jonathan Mix; Furtick

Elevation Worship chronology
"So Be It" (2026)	"Alleluia" (2026)

Music video
- "Alleluia" on YouTube

"Alleluia" is a song recorded live by the American contemporary worship collective Elevation Worship featuring singers Chandler Moore and Chris Brown. The song was released on February 5, 2026, via Elevation Worship Records. It impacted Christian radio in the United States as the second promotional single from Elevation Worship's thirteenth live album, So Be It. On May 29, 2026, the Alleluia EP was released, featuring the track as well as three alternate recordings.

== Composition ==
=== Development ===
"Alleluia" was written by Benjamin William Hastings, Moore, and Steven Furtick. The track was produced by Moore, Brown, Jonathan Mix, and Furtick, with Furtick also serving as executive producer. Drey Lavyne mastered while Samuel Gibson mixed. The song was engineered by Believe Kamba, Bryan Soto, Daniil Magay, Dustin Maxwell, Graham King, Ian Womack, Mix, Joshua Linker, Josie Flores Cardenas, Marco Cargnelutti, Nathan Decker, William Oakley, and Zach King. Moore and Brown each recorded lead vocals. Brown spoke of the song's meaning, explaining:

I love the intention in the lyric: 'I came to praise…that's why I woke up today.' This song is one big announcement from beginning to end that our God is worthy and He deserves our praise! We're having so much fun doing this live at church right now, and I hope that joy comes through.

— Chris Brown of Elevation Worship

=== Style ===
"Alleluia" has been noted for its energetic, celebratory sound, drawing comparisons to the collective's 2023 single "Praise". The track opens with the sound of a cheering crowd before building into an upbeat worship anthem containing rhythmic percussion and layered vocals. Critics have described the song as "upbeat" and "triumphant", making note of its dance-oriented feel and its emphasis on worship as a daily event. The song demonstrates the styles of contemporary worship music. It is composed in the key of B, with a speed of 125 beats per minute and a time signature of 4/4.

Niagara Frontier Publications described the song as "an upbeat, triumphant anthem." Jesus Freak Hideout observed that "the track reflects the group's message that worship extends beyond a Sunday moment; it's a daily posture and declaration." Michaela Halfast of K-Love described the song as "dance-worthy," observing it to be "the collective's most energetic song since 2023's 'Praise'." Jason Witt of Air1 described the song as "a full-blown praise celebration that demands movement" containing "[an] uptempo beat and infectious, rhythmic melodies." Lindsay Williams of Air1 described it as "the kind of song you want to wake up to, the type of encouragement you need along the marathon that is life," going on to observe that it contains "a triumphant beat," "a super-charged melody," and a "celebratory singalong feel." In a later commentary on the song, she made note of how it "launches praise like a missile," stating that "Moore and Brown have praise on their lips morning, noon and night across the frenetic, drum-heavy selection."

== Release and promotion ==
On February 3, 2026, "Alleluia" was announced for upcoming release. On February 5, 2026, the song was sent to K-Love and Air1-based Christian radio stations. It was released to digital download and streaming formats on February 6, 2026. Upon its release to digital download and streaming, the song was supported with a performance music video and lyric video, both of which were uploaded to YouTube. The song is scheduled for release to compact disc and LP record formats on March 20, 2026, alongside the rest of the album.

== Reception ==
=== Commercial ===
In the United States, "Alleluia" debuted at number 33 on the Billboard Christian Airplay chart during its first week of radio promotion, before later appearing on the overall Hot Christian Songs chart, where it peaked at number 26 the following week. Internationally, it appeared at number 29 on Recorded Music NZ's New Zealand Hot Singles chart.

=== Accolades ===
Year	Organization	Category	Result	Ref.
2026	K-Love Fan Awards	Worship Song of the Year	Nominated	

== Track listing ==
Alleluia EP track listing
No.	Title	Length
1.	"Alleluia" (radio version)	3:29
2.	"Alleluia" (featuring Chandler Moore and Chris Brown)	4:23
3.	"Alleluia" (Carolina version)	3:45
4.	"Aleluya" (Spanish version; featuring Elevation Español and Unified Sound)	4:07
Total length:		15:48

== Personnel ==
Credits adapted from Tidal Music.

=== Musicians ===
- Bailey Waldow – background vocals
- Believe Kamba – background vocals
- Brittany Diaz – background vocals
- Chandler Moore – lead vocals
- Chris Brown – acoustic guitar, lead vocals
- Daniel Pena-Fontenot – background vocals
- E. Edwards – acoustic guitar, guitar
- Elevation Choir – background vocals
- Emaurie Woods – background vocals
- Graham Alastair King – background vocals
- Hannah Cheshire – background vocals
- Isaiah Templeton – background vocals
- Jenna Barrientes – background vocals
- Joey Signa – guitar
- Jonsal Barrientes – background vocals
- Josh Holiday – keyboards
- Josiah Turner – background vocals
- L.J. Mitchell – organ
- Marrissa Smith – background vocals
- Nina Coffey – background vocals
- Otis Williams – drums
- Rachel Schumann – background vocals
- Scott Gardner – choirmaster, piano
- Shae Wooten – bass
- Tara Branstetter – background vocals
- Taylor Dobson – background vocals
- Taylor Thomas – background vocals
- Tiffany Hudson – background vocals
- Tori Elliot – background vocals
- Vincent Baynard – drums
- William Oakley – percussion
- Zach King – background vocals
- Zoey Deel – background vocals

=== Technical ===
- Believe Kamba – engineer
- Benjamin William Hastings – writer
- Bryan Soto – engineer
- Chandler Moore – producer, writer
- Chris Brown – producer
- Daniil Magay – engineer
- Drew Lavyne – masterer
- Dustin Maxwell – engineer
- Graham King – engineer
- Ian Womack – engineer
- Jonathan Mix – producer, programmer, recording engineer
- Joshua Linker – engineer
- Josie Flores Cardenas – engineer
- Marco Cargnelutti – engineer
- Nathan Decker – engineer
- Samuel Gibson – mixer
- Steven Furtick – producer, writer, executive producer
- William Oakley – engineer
- Zach King – engineer

== Charts ==
Chart performance for "Alleluia"
Chart (2026)	Peak position
New Zealand Hot Singles (RMNZ)	29
US Christian Airplay (Billboard)	6
US Hot Christian Songs (Billboard)	13

== Release history ==
Release history and formats for "Alleluia"
Region	Date	Format(s)	Label(s)	Ref.
United States	February 5, 2026	Christian radio	Elevation Worship Records	
Various	February 6, 2026	Digital download; streaming	Elevation Worship Records	
Various	March 20, 2026	CD; LP	Elevation Worship Records	
