= Sure thing =

Sure thing or Sure Thing may refer to:

- Certainty

== Music ==
- A Sure Thing, a 1962 album by jazz trumpeter Blue Mitchell
- "Sure Thing" (Foster & Lloyd song), 1987
- "Sure Thing" (Miguel song), 2011
- "Sure Thing" (Hillsong United song), 2021
- "Sure Thing", a song by St Germain
- "Sure Thing", a song by Jerome Kern and Ira Gershwin, for the film Cover Girl

== Other ==
- The Sure Thing, a 1985 romantic comedy directed by Rob Reiner
- Sure Thing (play), a 1988 short play by David Ives
- Sure Thing, a short novel by Isaac Asimov
- The Sure-thing principle in decision theory, as coined by statistician L. J. Savage.
