= Call God =

Song by Elevation Worship, Chandler Moore, and Chris Brown

from the album So Be It
- Released: February 20, 2026
- Recorded: September 2025
- Venue: Elevation Church
- Length: 6:34
- Label: Elevation Worship Records
- Songwriters: Benjamin William Hastings; Chandler Moore; Steven Furtick
- Producers: Moore; Chris Brown; Furtick

Music videos
- "Call God" on YouTube
- "Call God" (Lyrics) on YouTube

"Call God" is a song by the American contemporary worship music collective Elevation Worship, featuring singers Chandler Moore and Chris Brown. The song was recorded live at Elevation Church in September 2025. It was released on February 20, 2026, via Elevation Worship Records, as a member of the collective's album So Be It. "Call God" was written by Benjamin William Hastings, Moore, and Steven Furtick, while production was handled by Moore, Brown, and Furtick.

== Style ==
"Call God" has been considered to be one of the album's most direct expressions of dependence on God, shaped around intentionally simple lyrics. Critics noted that the song demonstrates the performer's ability to call to God in moments of uncertainty, using prayer as an immediate response. The track has been described as a reminder of God's presence. Several reviewers also praised the straightforwardness of its message, and its ability to align with the album's broader themes of authority of Jesus'. "Call God" was recorded as one of the more direct tracks on So Be It, built around the theme of turning to God in instances of uncertainty or need. The song was arranged with an emphasis on immediate response.

== Reception ==
=== Critical ===
Critics labelled "Call God" as a notable but less distinctive track on So Be It. Michael Carder of Jesus Freak Hideout described it as part of a series of songs that "circle the same central idea: lifting up and calling on the name of Jesus". He viewed "Call God" as effective within its purspose of being direct and aligning with the albums main theme. Timothy Yap of Jubilee Cast criticized it for being repetitive in comparison to the rest of So Be It; however, he praised how its simplicity contributes to the album's overall themes. Carder similarly commended the song's structure and devotional focus, placing it among the tracks most likely to perform well in church settings.

=== Commercial ===
Within its first charting frame, "Call God" debuted at its peak position of number 29 on the Billboard Hot Christian Songs chart in the United States. The song became the second highest charting album track from So Be It, excluding singles and promotional singles.

== Personnel ==
Credits adapted from Tidal.

=== Performers ===
- Andrew Joseph – background vocals
- Andria Alston – background vocals
- Brittany Diaz – background vocals
- Chandler Moore – lead vocals
- Chris Brown – acoustic guitar, lead vocals
- Davide Mutendji – background vocals
- E. Edwards – guitar
- Elevation Choir – background vocals
- Hannah Cheshire – background vocals
- Hannah Robinson – background vocals
- Isaiah Templeton – background vocals
- Jaleta Gardner – background vocals
- Jenna Barrientes – background vocals
- Joel Kreimeyer-Kelly – strings
- Joey Signa – guitar
- Josh Holiday – keyboards
- Jonsal Barrientes – background vocals
- L.J. Mitchell – organ
- Otis Williams – drums
- Scott Gardner – choirmaster, piano
- Shae Wooten – bass
- Tori Elliot – background vocals
- Vincent Baynard – drums
- William Oakley – percussion

=== Technical ===
- Believe Kamba – engineer
- Benjamin William Hastings – writer
- Bryan Soto – engineer
- Chandler Moore – producer, writer
- Chris Brown – producer
- Dustin Maxwell – engineer
- Graham King – engineer
- Ian Womack – engineer
- Jacob Sooter – producer
- Jonathan Mix – engineer
- Josh Holiday – programmer
- Joshua Linker – engineer
- Nathan Decker – engineer
- Samuel Gibson – masterer
- Scott Gardner – producer
- Steven Furtick – producer, writer, executive producer
- William Oakley – engineer
- Zach King – engineer

== Charts ==
Chart performance for "Call God"
Chart (2026)	Peak position
US Hot Christian Songs (Billboard)	29
