= So Be It (album) =

Live album by Elevation Worship
- Released: February 20, 2026
- Recorded: January 12, 2025; September 25, 2025
- Venues: Elevation Church (Charlotte, North Carolina)
- Genre: Worship
- Length: 59:24
- Label: Elevation Worship Records
- Producers: Ammo; Chandler Moore; Chris Brown; Jonathan Smith; Pat Barrett; Scott Gardner; Steven Furtick

Elevation Worship chronology
When Wind Meets Fire (2024)	So Be It (2026)	Promise and Presence (2026)

Singles from So Be It
- 1. "I Know a Name" Released: February 14, 2025; 2. "Jesus Be the Name" Released: October 17, 2025; 3. "God I'm Just Grateful" Released: November 7, 2025

So Be It (Note: Stylised in all caps) is the thirteenth live album and eighteenth album overall by the American contemporary worship collective Elevation Worship. The album was released independently on February 20, 2026. The featured worship leaders on the album are Tiffany Hudson, Chris Brown, Chandler Moore, Brandon Lake, Davide Mutendji, Tori Elliott, Isaiah Templeton, Leeland Mooring, and Jonsal Barrientes. The album was produced by Ammo, Moore, Brown, Jonathan Smith, Pat Barrett, Scott Gardner, and Steven Furtick.

So Be It was supported by the release of "I Know a Name", "Jesus Be the Name", and "God I'm Just Grateful" as singles, and "So Be It" and "Alleluia" as a promotional singles. "I Know a Name" peaked at number 5 on the US Hot Christian Songs chart. "Jesus Be the Name" peaked at number 12 on the chart. "God I'm Just Grateful" peaked at number 1 on the chart and number 4 on the Bubbling Under Hot 100 Singles chart. "So Be It" peaked at number 12 on the Hot Christian Songs and "Alleluia" peaked at number 14.

So Be It was a commercial success upon release. In the United States, the album debuted leading the Billboard Top Christian Albums chart, having reached number 125 on the overall Billboard 200 chart. In the United Kingdom, the album peaked at number 36 on the UK Album Downloads Chart and scored as runner-up on the UK Christian & Gospel Albums Chart. The album was well received by critics, many of whom praised the lyrical focus, energy, and "scriptural grounding", while the album was also criticized for not being particularly unique or innovative.

== Release and promotion ==
On February 14, 2025, "I Know a Name" was released as a single. It was premiered to Air1 before its first commercial release. "I Know a Name" was supported by both a music video and a lyric video, which were uploaded to YouTube. The song received notable success across Christian audiences, and was named by K-Love on their list of "25 Songs That Defined 2025".

"Jesus Be the Name" was released on October 17, 2025. It was recorded as a follow-up to "I Know a Name". The song was promoted by the release of both a music video and a lyric video, which were uploaded to YouTube. The third single from So Be It, "God I'm Just Grateful", was released on November 7, 2025. "God I'm Just Grateful" was promoted with the release of a music video, a lyric video, and an acoustic music video, which were uploaded to YouTube. The song was written to be Thanksgiving-themed.

On January 23, 2026, the album's title track was released as a promotional single. The song was teased to social media before its commercial released. It was promoted by the release of both a music video and a lyric video, which were uploaded to YouTube. Alongside the song's release, the full album was announced and made available for preorder. On February 3, 2026, "Alleluiah" was released as a radio-exclusive promotional single. The song was supported with a performance music video and lyric video, both of which were uploaded to YouTube. Upon the release of So Be It, the tracks "Call God", "Keep On", "Your Name is God", and "Thank You" were each promoted by lyric videos, while "I Got Saved" was promoted by both a lyric video and a music video.

== Style ==
The style of So Be It demonstrates Elevation Worship's emphasis on Bible‑centered contemporary worship, built around a live congregation and featuring modern production. Michael Carder of Jesus Freak Hideout described the album as "a declarative record… in agreement with the Word of God," pointing out its blend of alternating energetic and reflective instances supported with strong vocal performances. Timothy Yap of Jubilee Cast similarly noted the project's "polished" and "church‑ready" sound, identifying tracks such as "Jesus Be the Name" as "simple and highly singable", although he criticized the album for being "solid and serviceable, but rarely surprising".

Several critics also observed that the album's theme had been shaped by its recurring focus on the authority of Jesus' name and its live‑worship atmosphere. Darcy Webber of Today's Christian Entertainment praised the group's ability to develop "biblically sound lyrics and Spirit‑evoking music", labelling the title track as "the perfect 2026 Easter worship song". In a simailar vein, Clive Banda of Worship Chronicle observed the album's "collaborative energy" and its balance of "polished" execution with an "organic feel", writing that So Be It "flows like a worship service" and functions as "a manifesto of faith, surrender, and victory."

== Development ==
So Be It was recorded during a deliberate period of slowing down in Elevation Worship's long-running process of nearly annual releases, marking a departure from the group's typical production rhythm. After an intensive 2024 recording period that produced two live albums and more than twenty songs, the group entered 2025 with what Brown described as having "emptied the chamber", prompting a year focused on writing rather than recording. The album emerged from a creative process that emphasized writing without deadlines, including the group's first writing retreat in several years, and a more selective approach to tracklisting that reduced the final set to ten songs rather than the usual fourteen or fifteen. This change resulted in a move away from the larger, longer tracklists of previous Elevation Worship albums. The album's development distinguishes So Be It as more intentionally curated and selective in comparison with other albums the group's discography. The album was recorded live at Elevation Church in September 2025.

=== Theme and artwork ===
So Be It is centered largely on declarations of God's authority, the power of Jesus’ name, and the musicians' response of gratitude. The album emphasizes "the authority and supremacy of Christ", with its ten songs themed around the finality of God's Word and the assurance that what God speaks "is irrevocable". Notable examples include the tracks "Jesus Be the Name" and "I Know a Name", which function as "sister selections", demonstrating both the exaltation of Jesus and the outcome of following Him. Other notable examples of this include songs such as "Thank You", "Keep On", and "God I'm Just Grateful". This is also demonstrated in the album's cover artwork, which features a gold signet ring against a red background, interpreted to symbolizing "God's sovereignty and dominion".

== Reception ==
Professional ratings
Review scores
Source	Rating
Jesus Freak Hideout	4/5 stars
Jubilee Cast	3/5 stars
Today's Christian Entertainment	5/5 stars

=== Critical ===
So Be It received mixed-to-positive reviews from critics. Michael Carder of Jesus Freak Hideout gave the album 4 out of 5 stars, praising its scriptural grounding, strong vocal performances, and balance of energetic and reflective worship. He highlighted the title track as "a bold, proclamative anthem" and noted that songs such as "Alleluia", "Keep On," and "I Got Saved" are likely to connect in church settings. Writing for JubileeCast, Timothy Yap awarded the album 3 out of 5 stars, calling it "solid and serviceable" but not particularly innovative. He praised "I Got Saved" and the melody of "Jesus Be the Name," while critiquing the album's recurring thematic focus for creating "thematic saturation." Yap concluded that the project is polished and church-ready, though it does not significantly advance the group's sound.

Darcy Webber of Today's Christian Entertainment gave So Be It a 5-out-of-5 review, praising its "biblically sound lyrics," live energy, and emphasis on "the authority of Jesus' name." She described the title track as an ideal 2026 Easter worship song and noted "I Know A Name" as already popular in congregational settings. Clive Banda of Worship Chronicle also offered a strongly positive review, praising the album's scriptural depth, collaborative performances, and blend of polished production with an organic live feel. He wrote that the project "flows like a worship service" and stands as a creative high point in Elevation Worship's catalog.

=== Commercial ===
"I Know a Name" debuted at peak positions of number 5 on the Hot Christian Songs chart. The song later went on to reach a peak of number 2 on the Christian Airplay chart. On the year-end charts of 2025, "I Know a Name" appeared at number 7 on the Hot Christian Songs chart and number 10 on the Christian Airplay chart. The following single, "Jesus Be the Name", peaked at number 11 on the Hot Christian Songs and number 35 on the Christian Airplay chart. "God I'm Just Grateful" peaked at number 1 on the Hot Christian Songs chart and number 4 on the Bubbling Under Hot 100 Singles chart. "So Be It" debuted at its peak position of number 12 on the Hot Christian Songs chart.

The album itself was commercially successful within its first charting frame. In the United Kingdom, So Be It reached number 36 on the Official Charts Company's UK Album Downloads chart and number 2 on the UK Christian & Gospel Albums chart. In the United States, the album debuted in the top position on the Billboard Top Christian Albums chart, and on the overall Billboard 200, it reached number 125. Each of the album's five album tracks entered the Hot Christian Songs chart upon the album's release, with "I Got Saved" being the highest, reaching number 16 on the chart. It was followed by "Call God", "Thank You", "Keep On", and "Your Name is God", which each placed at numbers 29, 31, 33, and 38 on the chart, respectively.

=== Industry awards ===
==== Album ====
Year	Organization	Category	Result	Ref.
2026	Dove Awards	Worship Album of the Year	Nominated	

==== Song-specific ====
Year	Organization	Nominee / work	Category	Result	Ref.
2025	Dove Awards	"I Know a Name"	Worship Recorded Song of the Year	Won	
2026	Grammy Awards	"I Know a Name"	Best Contemporary Christian Music Performance/Song	Nominated	
2026	K-Love Fan Awards	"Alleluia"	Worship Song of the Year	Nominated	
2026	Dove Awards	"God I'm Just Grateful"	Song of the Year	Nominated	
2026	Dove Awards	"I Know a Name"	Song of the Year	Nominated	
2026	Dove Awards	"God I'm Just Grateful"	Worship Recorded Song of the Year	Won	
2026	ASCAP Awards	Most Performed Christian Songs	"I Know a Name"	Honored	
2026	ASCAP Awards	Most Performed Christian Songs	"God I'm Just Grateful"	Honored	
2027	Grammy Awards	Best Contemporary Christian Music Performance/Song	"God I'm Just Grateful"	Pending	

== Track listing ==
So Be It track listing
No.	Title	Writer(s)	Producer(s)	Length
1.	"So Be It" (featuring Tiffany Hudson and Chris Brown)	Davide Mutendji; Mitch Wong; Steven Furtick; Tiffany Hudson	Chris Brown; Jonathan Smith; Furtick	5:48
2.	"Alleluia" (featuring Brown and Chandler Moore)	Benjamin William Hastings; Chandler Moore; Furtick	Moore; Brown; Jonathan Mix; Furtick	4:24
3.	"I Know a Name" (featuring Brown and Brandon Lake)	Lake; Hank Bentley; Furtick; Jacob Sooter	Brown; Furtick	7:09
4.	"Jesus Be the Name" (featuring Tiffany Hudson)	Mutendji; Wong; Furtick; Hudson	Brown; Scott Gardner; Furtick	8:59
5.	"Call God" (featuring Brown and Moore)	Hastings; Moore; Furtick	Moore; Brown; Furtick	6:34
6.	"Keep On" (featuring Mutendji, Tori Elliot, and Isaiah Templeton)	Mutendji; Hannah Cheshire; Templeton; Jonsal Barrientes; Gardner; Furtick; Hudson; Elliot	Brown; Gardner; Furtick	4:41
7.	"Your Name is God" (featuring Leeland Mooring)	Josh Holiday; Mooring; Furtick	Brown; Furtick	5:04
8.	"Thank You" (featuring Hudson and Barrientes)	Mooring; Wong; Furtick; Hudson	Brown; Mix; Furtick	6:31
9.	"I Got Saved" (featuring Brown)	Lake; Sooter; Pat Barrett; Furtick	Brown; Sooter; Furtick	5:14
10.	"God I'm Just Grateful" (featuring Moore)	Abubakar Baker Shariff-Farr; Moore; Joshua Coleman; Barrett; Furtick	Ammo; Moore; Brown; Smith; Holiday; Furtick	5:00
Total length:				59:24

== Personnel ==
Credits adapted from liner notes.

=== Vocalists ===
- Andrew Joseph – background vocals
- Andria Alston – background vocals
- Brandon Lake – lead vocals (3)
- Brittany Diaz – background vocals
- Chandler Moore – lead vocals (2, 5, 10)
- Chris Brown – lead vocals (1–3, 5, 9), background vocals
- Davide Mutendji – lead vocals (6), background vocals
- Hannah Cheshire – background vocals
- Hannah Robinson – background vocals
- Isaiah Templeton – lead vocals (6), background vocals
- Johnny Collier – background vocals
- Jaleta Gardner – background vocals
- Jenna Barrientes – background vocals
- Jonsal Barrientes – lead vocals (8), background vocals
- Leeland Mooring – lead vocals (7)
- Mapi Ramirez – background vocals
- Tiffany Hudson – lead vocals (1, 4, 8), background vocals
- Tori Elliott – lead vocals (6), background vocals

=== Instrumentalists ===
- Brandon Lake – acoustic guitar
- Chris Brown – acoustic guitar
- E. Edwards – guitar, acoustic guitar
- Jacob Sooter – keys
- Joey Kreimeyer-Kelly – strings
- Joey Signa – guitar
- Josh Holiday – keys
- Leeland Mooring – acoustic guitar
- LJ Mitchell – organ
- Otis Williams – drums
- Scott Gardner – piano
- Shae Wooten – bass
- Tony Lambright Jr. – percussion
- Vincent Baynard – drums
- William Oakley – percussion

=== Production ===
- Ammo – producer (10)
- Believe Kamba – additional engineer
- Bryan Soto – additional engineer
- Chandler Moore – producer (2, 5, 10)
- Chris Brown – producer
- Cory Edwards – additional engineer
- Daniil Magay – additional engineer
- Drew Lavyne – masterer (1–3, 5–9)
- Dustin Maxwell – additional engineer
- Graham King – additional engineer
- Ian Womack – additional engineer
- Jacob Sooter – producer (9), programming
- Jonathan Buffum – additional engineer
- Jonathan Mix – producer (2, 8), engineer, masterer (4, 10), programming
- Jonathan Smith – (1, 10), programming
- Jose Flores – additional engineer
- Josh Holiday – producer (10), programmer
- Joshua Linker – additional engineer
- Marco Cargnelutti – additional engineer
- Nathan Decker – additional engineer
- Samuel Gibson – mixer
- Scott Gardner – producer (4, 6), programmer
- Steven Furtick – producer, executive producer
- Tai Mahawon – additional engineer
- William Oakley – additional engineer
- Zach King – additional engineer

=== Artwork ===
- Corey Pruitt – creative director, designer
- Dylan Roop – designer
- Orlando Munguia – designer
- Tim Womble – photographer

== Charts ==
Weekly chart performance for So Be It
Chart (2026)	Peak position
UK Album Downloads (Official Charts)	36
UK Christian & Gospel Albums (Official Charts)	2
US Billboard 200	125
US Top Christian Albums (Billboard)	1

== Release history ==
Release history and formats for So Be It
Region	Date	Format(s)	Label(s)	Ref.
Various	February 20, 2026	Digital download; streaming	Elevation Worship Records	
Various	March 20, 2026	CD; LP	Provident; Sony	
