= God I'm Just Grateful =

Single by Elevation Worship featuring Chandler Moore

from the album So Be It
- Released: November 7, 2025
- Recorded: September 2025
- Genre: Contemporary worship music
- Length: 5:00
- Label: Elevation Worship Records
- Songwriters: Abubakar Baker Shariff-Farr; Chandler Moore; Joshua Coleman; Pat Barrett; Steven Furtick
- Producers: Ammo; Moore; Chris Brown; Jonathan Smith; Josh Holiday; Furtick

Elevation Worship singles chronology
"Jesus Be the Name" (2025)	"God I'm Just Grateful" (2025)	"So Be It" (2026)

Chandler Moore singles chronology
"In the Name of Jesus" (2025)	"God I'm Just Grateful" (2025)	"Aleluia Santo (Ao Vivo)" (2025)

Music videos
- "God I'm Just Grateful" on YouTube
- "God I'm Just Grateful" (Lyrics) on YouTube
- "God I'm Just Grateful" (Acoustic) on YouTube

"God I'm Just Grateful" (Note: Occasionally stylized as "God, I'm Just Grateful") is a song recorded live by American contemporary worship collective Elevation Worship featuring gospel musician Chandler Moore. The song was officially released as a single on November 7, 2025, through Elevation Worship Records. The song was written by Abubakar Baker Shariff-Farr, Moore, Joshua Coleman, Pat Barrett, and Steven Furtick, and produced by Ammo, Moore, Chris Brown, Jonathan Smith, Josh Holiday, and Furtick.

== Background ==
In October 2025, Moore, alongside Naomi Raine, announced their departure from Maverick City Music, an American gospel music collective, in what Billboard described as an "abrupt exit." Following his departure, Moore became involved in a public legal dispute with the collective, the claims of which were denied by its leadership. Moore later joined a newly founded gospel music collective, God Aura, alongside several other former members of Maverick City Music. "God I'm Just Grateful" marked Moore's first song recorded following his departure from Maverick City Music. As a result, another lawsuit ensued, in which it was determined whether or not Moore was able to continue recording music as a solo musician, or if he must remain with Maverick City Music and the label Tribl Records until he had fulfilled his contract. The consensus allowed him to continue independent of the collective and label.

== Release and promotion ==
"God I'm Just Grateful" was supported by the release of a performance music video, which was uploaded to YouTube. It was published by Music by Elevation Worship Publishing, For Humans Publishing, and Maverick City Publishing, despite Moore's departure from the collective; with Music by Elevation Worship controlling 28.34% ownership, For Humans controlling 14.16%, and Maverick City controlling 14.17%. The song was released to major digital download and streaming platforms. It was promoted with the release of a music video on November 6, 2025, a lyric video on November 10, 2025, and an acoustic music video on January 17, 2026. Moore later released a pop remix as the song's sole performer.

== Writing and development ==
Moore labelled "God I'm Just Grateful" as his favorite song which he had collaborated with Furtick and Elevation Worship on. It was recorded live in September 2025, at Elevation Church. The song was written to be Thanksgiving-themed. Jesus Freak Hideout noted that it is a "heartfelt song of thankfulness." The song was inspired by the Bible passage of Psalm 107:1, which states, "Give thanks to the Lord, for he is good; his love endures forever." "God I'm Just Grateful" is composed in the key of D, with a speed of 73 beats per minute and a time signature of 4/4. It runs for five minutes. The song contains a "live-worship aesthetic," characteristic of the style of contemporary worship music.

Brown said of the song:

We felt a genuine sense of awe and thankfulness in the room when this song was written and recorded. Sometimes, the most powerful statement you can make in worship is the simplest one: "God, I’m just grateful." We pray this track helps people articulate that simple, profound gratitude for His constant faithfulness and enduring love in a season where we’re intentionally counting our blessings.

Moore also stated that:

I've written some of my favorite songs with Pastor Furtick and Elevation Worship, and "God I’m Just Grateful" is right at the top of that list. It captures exactly what we feel every time we come together—it's an overflow of genuine thanks. This song isn't about striving; it's about simply being thankful for who God is and all He's done.

== Reception ==
=== Critical ===
Coghive praised the song's "incredible vocal talent and songwriting prowess", observing that it was "soul-stirring" and a "powerful, heartfelt prayer of profound appreciation," overall noting that the song was a "beautiful soundtrack for personal reflection and corporate worship."

=== Commercial ===
"God I'm Just Grateful" debuted at No. 6 on the Billboard Hot Christian Songs chart week dated to November 22, 2025, concurrently appearing at No. 4 on the Christian Digital Song Sales chart and No. 14 on the Christian Streaming Songs chart. For the chart week dated to December 6, 2025, the song achieved its peak of No. 5 on the Hot Christian Songs chart and No. 8 on the Christian Streaming Songs chart. The song marks Elevation Worship's twelfth top-five entry into the Billboard Hot Christian Songs chart.

=== Accolades ===
Year	Organization	Category	Result	Ref.
2026	Dove Awards	Song of the Year	Nominated	
2026	Dove Awards	Worship Recorded Song of the Year	Won	
2026	ASCAP Awards	Most Performed Christian Songs	Honored	
2027	Grammy Awards	Best Contemporary Christian Music Performance/Song	Pending	

== Personnel ==
Credits adapted from Tidal Music.

=== Musicians ===
- Brittany Diaz – background vocals
- Chandler Moore – keyboards, lead vocals
- Chris Brown – acoustic guitar, background vocals
- Davide Mutendji – background vocals
- E. Edwards – guitar
- Elevation Worship Choir – background vocals
- Hannah Cheshire – background vocals
- Isaiah Templeton – background vocals
- Jenna Barrientes – background vocals
- Joey Signa – guitar
- Jonsal Barrientes – background vocals
- Josh Holiday – keyboards
- LJ Mitchell – organ
- Otis Williams – drums
- Scott Gardner – piano
- Shae Wooten – bass
- Tiffany Hudson – background vocals
- Tori Elliott – background vocals
- Vincent Baynard – drums
- William Oakley – percussion

=== Technical ===
- Abubaker Baker Shariff-Farr – writer
- Believe Kamba – engineer
- Bryan Soto – engineer
- Chandler Moore – producer, writer
- Chris Brown – producer
- Dustin Maxwell – engineer
- Graham King – engineer
- Ian Womack – engineer
- Jonathan Mix – recording engineer
- Jonathan Smith – producer, programmer
- Josh Holiday – producer, programmer
- Joshua Coleman – producer, writer
- Joshua Linker – engineer
- Nathan Decker – engineer
- Pat Barrett – writer
- Samuel Gibson – masterer, mixer
- Steven Furtick – producer, writer, executive producer
- William Oakley – engineer
- Zach King – engineer

== Charts ==
=== Elevation Worship version ===
Chart performance for "God I'm Just Grateful"
Chart (2025–2026)	Peak position
New Zealand Hot Singles (RMNZ)	33
US Billboard Hot 100	87
US Christian Airplay (Billboard)	38
US Hot Christian Songs (Billboard)	1

=== Chandler Moore solo version ===
Chart performance for "God, I'm Just Grateful"
Chart (2026)	Peak position
US Christian Airplay (Billboard)	6
US Hot Christian Songs (Billboard)	12
US Hot Gospel Songs (Billboard)	2

== Certifications ==
Certifications for "God I'm Just Grateful"
Region	Certification	Certified units/sales
United States (RIAA)	Platinum	1,000,000^{‡}
^{‡} Sales+streaming figures based on certification alone.

== Release history ==
Release history and formats for "God I'm Just Grateful"
Region	Date	Format(s)	Label(s)
Various	November 7, 2025	Digital download; streaming	Elevation Worship Records
Various	February 20, 2026	Digital download; streaming; (with So Be It)	Elevation Worship Records
Various	March 20, 2026	CD; LP; (with So Be It)	Elevation Worship Records
