= On Repeat =

On Repeat may refer to:

- "On Repeat" (Hillsong United song), 2022
- "On Repeat", a song by LCD Soundsystem from LCD Soundsystem, 2005
- "On Repeat", a song by Keke Wyatt from Rated Love, 2016
