= I Know a Name =

Single by Brandon Lake, Elevation Worship, and CeCe Winans

from the album King of Hearts and So Be It
- Released: February 14, 2025
- Length: 7:09 (single version); 5:39 (album version)
- Label: Elevation Worship; Provident Label Group; Sony Music
- Songwriters: Brandon Lake; Hank Bentley; Steven Furtick; Jacob Scooter
- Producers: Chris Brown; Steven Furtick

Brandon Lake singles chronology
"Can't Steal My Joy" (2025)	"I Know a Name" (2025)	"Daddy's DNA" (2025)

Elevation Worship singles chronology
"God Is Not Against Me" (2024)	"I Know a Name" (2025)	"Jesus Be the Name" (2025)

CeCe Winans singles chronology
"It's Christmas" (2024)	"I Know a Name" (2025)

Music video
- "I Know a Name on YouTube

"I Know a Name" is a song by Brandon Lake and Elevation Worship. The song was officially released as a single on February 14, 2025, through Elevation Worship Records.

The first edition of the song, released on February 14, 2025, was recorded live at Elevation Church in Charlotte, North Carolina. On the same day, a solo version of the song was released as an Amazon-exclusive by Lake. On June 13, 2025, an album version of the song is set to be released from Lake's fifth studio album, King of Hearts. The album version is two minutes shorter than the single version and features a guest appearance from singer CeCe Winans.

== Writing and composition ==
The song was written by Brandon Lake, Hank Bentley, Steven Furtick, and Jacob Scooter. It was produced by Chris Brown and Steven Furtick. Brown said of the song's lyrical theme,

"When I recognize my own insufficiency, I make room for the One who is all-sufficient to step in. I don’t have enough wisdom, don’t know how to get over this anxiety, don’t know if I’ve got enough strength to keep fighting, but I know the One who does. His name is Jesus and he holds all authority in heaven and on earth."

The song is written in the key of C with a tempo of 86 beats per minutes and a time signature of 6/8.

== Accolades ==
At the 2025 GMA Dove Awards, "I Know a Name" was nominated for Worship Recorded Song of the Year.

Year	Organization	Category	Result	Ref.
2025	GMA Dove Awards	Worship Recorded Song of the Year	Won	
2026	Grammy Award	Best Contemporary Christian Music Performance/Song	Nominated	
2026	GMA Dove Awards	Song of the Year	Nominated	
2026	ASCAP Awards	Most Performed Christian Songs	Honored	

Year-end lists
Publication	Accolade	Rank	Ref.
K-Love	25 Songs That Defined 2025	Unordered	
Air1	Air1 Unwrapped 2025	4	

== Commercial performance ==
"I Know a Name" debuted at its peak position of No. 5 on the Billboard Hot Christian Songs chart. It was No. 3 on the Christian Digital Song Sales and No. 4 on the Christian Streaming Songs charts. It later peaked at No. 2 on the Billboard Christian Airplay chart and No. 5 on the Christian AC Airplay chart.

== Track listing ==
Single version and So Be It album version
No.	Title	Writer(s)	Performer(s)	Length
1.	"I Know a Name"	Brandon Lake; Hank Bentley; Steven Furtick; Jacob Scooter	Brandon Lake; Elevation Worship; Chris Brown	7:09

Amazon-exclusive version
No.	Title	Writer(s)	Performer(s)	Length
1.	"I Know a Name"	Brandon Lake; Hank Bentley; Steven Furtick; Jacob Scooter	Brandon Lake	5:39

King of Hearts album version (Note: Full album not featured on this list)
No.	Title	Writer(s)	Performer(s)	Length
1.	"I Know a Name"	Brandon Lake; Hank Bentley; Steven Furtick; Jacob Scooter	Brandon Lake; CeCe Winans	5:39

== Credits ==
Adapted from AllMusic.

- Andrew Joseph – backing vocals
- Andria Alston – backing vocals
- Brandon Lake – composer, writer, acoustic guitar, lead vocalist
- Chris Brown – acoustic guitar, lead vocalist, producer
- Cory Edwards – engineer
- Davide Mutendji – backing vocals
- Drew Lavyne – engineer, mastering
- E. Edwards – backing vocals
- Graham King – engineer
- Hank Bentley – composer, writer
- Hannah Robinson – backing vocals
- Jacob Scooter – composer, keyboards, programmer
- Jaleta Gardner – backing vocals
- Joey Signa – guitar
- Johnny Collier – backing vocals
- Jonathan Buffum – engineer
- Jonathan Mix – editing, engineer
- Josh Linker – engineer
- LJ Mitchell – organ
- Mapi Ramirez – backing vocals
- Samuel Gibson – mixing, engineer
- Scott Gardner – piano
- Shae Wooten – bass guitar
- Steven Furtick – composer, writer, executive producer, producer
- Tai Mahawon – engineer
- Tiffany Hudson – backing vocals
- Vincent Baynard – drums
- William Oakly – engineer

== Charts ==
=== Weekly charts ===
==== Elevation Worship version ====
Weekly chart performance for "I Know a Name"
Chart (2025)	Peak position
US Hot Christian Songs (Billboard)	5
US Christian Airplay (Billboard)	2

==== Brandon Lake solo version ====
Weekly chart performance for "I Know a Name"
Chart (2025)	Peak position
US Hot Christian Songs (Billboard)	13

==== CeCe Winans version ====
Weekly chart performance for "I Know a Name"
Chart (2025)	Peak position
US Christian Digital Song Sales (Billboard)	2

=== Year-end charts ===
==== Elevation Worship version ====
Year-end chart performance for "I Know a Name"
Chart (2025)	Position
US Hot Christian Songs (Billboard)	7
US Christian Airplay (Billboard)	10
US Christian Adult Contemporary (Billboard)	14

==== Brandon Lake solo version ====
Year-end chart performance for "I Know a Name"
Chart (2025)	Position
US Hot Christian Songs (Billboard)	44

== Certifications ==
Certifications for "I Know a Name"
Region	Certification	Certified units/sales
United States (RIAA)	Gold	500,000^{‡}
^{‡} Sales+streaming figures based on certification alone.

== Release history ==
Release history for "I Know a Name"
Region	Version	Date	Format	Label	Ref.
Various	Original; live	February 14, 2025	Digital download; streaming	Elevation Worship Records	
Various	Solo	February 14, 2025	Digital download	Provident Label Group; Sony Music	
Various	Album	June 13, 2025	Digital download; streaming; CD; LP; (with King of Hearts)	Provident Label Group; Sony Music	
Various	Live	March 20, 2026	Digital download; streaming; CD; (with So Be It)	Elevation Worship Records	
