= Covers (Blessing Offor EP) =

EP by Blessing Offor
- Released: December 6, 2024
- Genre: Christian contemporary; gospel; pop
- Length: 14:19
- Language: English
- Label: Capitol CMG
- Producer: Blessing Offor; Morgan Taylor Reid

Blessing Offor chronology
Snow Globe (2024)	Covers (2024)

Singles from Covers
- 1. "Godspeed" Released: November 2023

Covers is an extended play by Nigerian-born American Christian and gospel music artist Blessing Offor. The extended play was released on December 6, 2024, through Capitol Christian Music Group. It includes remixes and covers of previously released songs by other artists, including Frank Ocean, Taylor Swift, John Mayer, and Bob Dylan. It features a guest appearance from Bob Lanzetti of Snarky Puppy. The opening track "Godspeed" was released as a single, and achieved a peak chart position of No. 33 on the Billboard Hot Christian Songs chart. The song "Make You Feel My Love" was initially released on the live EP Brighter Days (Live Session) in 2022.

== Track listing ==
No.	Title	Writer(s)	Original artist	Length
1.	"Godspeed"	Christopher Breaux; Malay Ho	Frank Ocean	2:42
2.	"Holy Ground"	Taylor Swift	Taylor Swift	3:20
3.	"Gravity"	John Mayer	John Mayer	4:27
4.	"Make You Feel My Love" (with Bob Lanzetti)	Bob Dylan	Bob Dylan	3:48
Total length:				14:19

== Charting songs ==
Song	Chart (2023)	Peak position
"Godspeed"	US Hot Christian Songs (Billboard)	33
