= So Be It (Elevation Worship song) =

Promotional single by Elevation Worship, Chris Brown, and Tiffany Hudson

from the album So Be It
- Released: January 23, 2026
- Recorded: September 2025
- Genre: Contemporary worship
- Length: 5:48
- Label: Elevation Worship Records
- Songwriters: Davide Mutendji; Mitch Wong; Steven Furtick; Tiffany Hudson
- Producers: Chris Brown; Smith; Furtick

Elevation Worship chronology
"God I'm Just Grateful" (2025)	"So Be It" (2026)	"Alleluia" (2026)

Music video
- "So Be It" on YouTube

"So Be It" (Note: Stylized in all caps) is a song recorded live by the American contemporary worship collective Elevation Worship featuring singers Chris Brown and Tiffany Hudson. The song was released as a promotional single on January 23, 2026, via Elevation Worship Records. Alongside its release, an album of the same name was announced.

== Writing and development ==
"So Be It" was written by Davide Mutendji, Mitch Wong, Steven Furtick, and Hudson. Brown, Jonathan Smith, and Furtick produced. Drey Lavyne mastered while Samuel Gibson mixed. Brown and Hudson each recorded lead vocals. Hudson spoke on the song's meaning, explaining:

'So Be It' declares the sovereignty and finality of God's word. If God spoke it, it's as good as done. We can be confident that nothing could ever overturn or override the word of God.

— Tiffany Hudson of Elevation Worship

Niagara Frontier Publications observed that the song contains "a sweeping, cinematic sound", describing it as "an anthemic proclamation of what has already been settled" which held "commanding authority." It is themed around the idea that, "when God speaks, His word is final." The song demonstrates the styles of contemporary worship music. It is composed in the key of A flat, with a speed of 127 beats per minute and a time signature of 4/4.

== Release and promotion ==
For several weeks before the release of "So Be It", teasers were released to social media. On January 18, 2026, the song's upcoming release was announced. Upon its release, it was supported with a music video, which was uploaded to YouTube. It was announced that a mononymously-titled live album would be released on February 20, 2026. Alongside the announcement and release of the title track, the album was made available for preorder.

On March 20, 2026, the song is scheduled for release to compact disk and LP record formats, alongside the rest of the album.

== Commercial performance ==
Within its first charting frame, "So Be It" debuted at its peak position of number 12 on the Billboard Hot Christian Songs chart. It also appeared on the supporting charts Christian Digital Song Sales and Christian Streaming Songs at numbers 3 and 22, respectively.

== Personnel ==
Credits adapted from Tidal Music.

=== Musicians ===
- Brittany Diaz – background vocals
- Chris Brown – acoustic guitar, lead vocals
- Daniel Pena-Fontenot – background vocals
- Davide Mutendji – background vocals
- E. Edwards – guitar
- Elevation Choir – background vocals
- Emaurie Woods – background vocals
- Erica Mitterling – background vocals
- Graham King – background vocals
- Hannah Cheshire – background vocals
- Ian Womack – background vocals
- Isaiah Templeton – background vocals
- Jenna Barrientes – background vocals
- Joel Kreimeyer-Kelly – strings
- Joey Signa – guitar
- Jonsal Barrientes – background vocals
- Josh Holiday – keyboards
- Josiah Turner – background vocals
- LJ Mitchell – organ
- Maayan Eaves – background vocals
- Marissa Smith – background vocals
- Nina Coffey – background vocals
- Otis Williams – drums
- Rachel Schumann – background vocals
- Scott Gardner – choir, piano
- Shae Wooten – bass
- Tara Branstetter – background vocals
- Taylor Dobson – background vocals
- Taylor Thomas – background vocals
- Tiffany Hudson – lead vocals
- Tori Elliott – background vocals
- Violet Knull – background vocals
- Vincent Baynard – drums
- William Oakley – background vocals, percussion
- Zach King – background vocals

=== Technical ===
- Believe Kamba – engineer
- Bryan Soto – engineer
- Chris Brown – producer
- Daniil Magay – engineer
- Davide Mutendji – writer
- Drew Lavyne – masterer
- Dustin Maxwell – engineer
- Graham King – engineer
- Ian Womack – engineer
- Jonathan Mix – programmer, recording engineer
- Jonathan Smith – producer, programmer
- Joshua Linker – engineer
- Josie Flores Carenas – engineer
- Marco Cargnelutti – engineer
- Mitch Wong – writer
- Nathan Decker – engineer
- Samuel Gibson – mixer
- Steven Furtick – producer, writer, executive producer
- Tiffany Hudson – writer
- William Oakley – engineer
- Zach King – engineer

== Charts ==
Chart performance for "So Be It"
Chart (2026)	Peak position
New Zealand Hot Singles (RMNZ)	13
US Christian Airplay (Billboard)	30
US Hot Christian Songs (Billboard)	12

== Release history ==
Release history and formats for "So Be It"
Region	Date	Format(s)	Label(s)	Ref.
Various	January 23, 2026	Digital download; streaming	Elevation Worship Records	
Various	March 20, 2026	Digital download; streaming; CD; LP	Elevation Worship Records	
