= Jesus Be the Name =

Single by Elevation Worship and Tiffany Hudson

from the album So Be It
- Released: October 17, 2025
- Recorded: September 2025
- Venue: Elevation Church
- Genre: Contemporary worship; ballad
- Length: 8:59
- Label: Elevation Worship Records
- Songwriters: Davide Mutendji; Mitch Wong; Steven Furtick; Tiffany Hudson
- Producers: Chris Brown; Scott Gardner; Furtick

Elevation Worship singles chronology
"I Know a Name" (2025)	"Jesus Be the Name" (2025)	"God I'm Just Grateful" (2025)

Tiffany Hudson singles chronology
"All Authority" (2025)	"Jesus Be the Name" (2025)

Music videos
- "Jesus Be the Name" on YouTube
- "Jesus Be the Name" (Lyrics) on YouTube

"Jesus Be the Name" is a song recorded live by the American contemporary worship collective Elevation Worship featuring Tiffany Hudson. It was released on October 17, 2025, as the second single from the album So Be It (2026). The song was recorded as a sequel to the group's preceding single, "I Know a Name". "Jesus Be the Name" was written by Davide Mutendji, Mitch Wong, Steven Furtick, and Hudson, while Chris Brown, Scott Gardner, and Furtick produced.

== Release and promotion ==
Upon release, "Jesus Be the Name" was promoted by both a music video and lyric video, each of which were uploaded to YouTube. On March 20, 2026, the song is scheduled for release to CD and LP formats, alongside the rest of So Be It.

== Composition ==
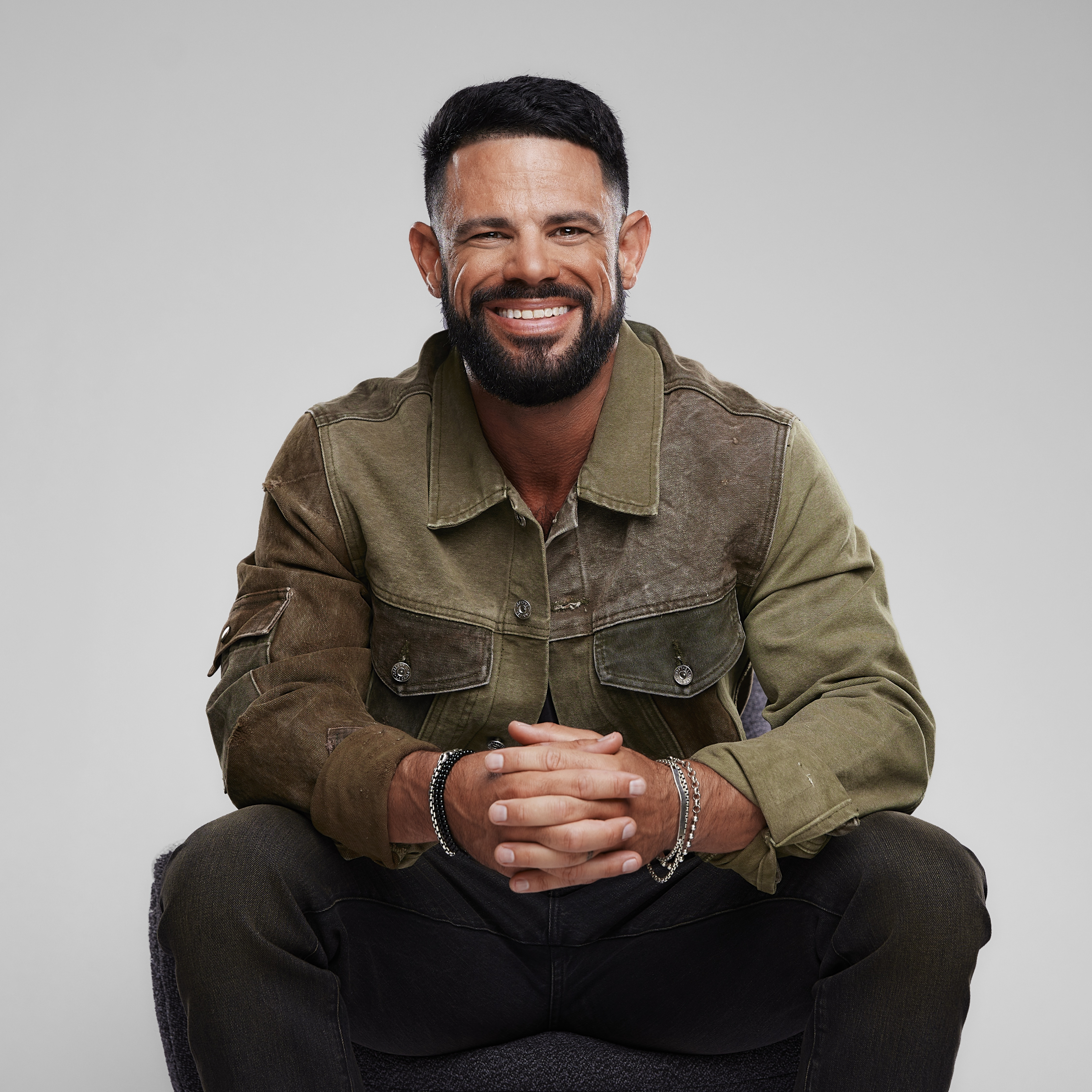
Steven Furtick (pictured) wrote "Jesus Be the Name" alongside Davide Mutendji, Mitch Wong, and Tiffany Hudson

=== Lyrics and meaning ===
The lyrics of "Jesus Be the Name" center on the authority, character, and exaltation of Jesus, drawing heavily from Scripture. Scott Savage of Air1 wrote that the song "elevates the name of Jesus rather than any one individual", contrasting its message with cultural desires for fame. He noted that the band intended to "put language to the awe and reverence we feel when we call on the name of Jesus", quoting their reflection that "God met us in such a tangible way" during the writing session. Lindsay Williams similarly observed that the song's "poetic lyrics were inspired by Philippians 2:9", which states:

Therefore God exalted him to the highest place

and gave him the name that is above every name.

The quotation demonstrates the song's thematic focus in biblical inspiration. Timothy Yap of Jubilee Cast made note of the song's lyrical portrayal of Jesus' "unrivaled authority and beauty". Producer Chris Brown also went on to describe the song's lyrical meaning, saying that:

We didn't set out to just write another worship song. We wanted to put language to the awe and reverence we feel when we call on the name of Jesus. That night, something incredible happened-God met us in such a tangible way. We could feel the weight of His glory in the room. Our prayer is that people around the world will experience that same encounter when they hear this song.

Reviewers praised the inclusion of personal testimony. Savage particularly described the second verse—"You have been the friend who never left / I won’t forget Your faithfulness / Jesus be the name ever on my lips"—as an example of how the lyrics express both "intimacy and nearness with Jesus" and His "holiness and majesty". Williams noted that the bridge extols titles such as "the Resurrection and the Life", "the Bread of Life", and "the Wounded and Worthy One", further evidence of the song's biblical inspiration. Yap later argued that its focus on Jesus' name contributes to the album's broader themes. Darcy Webber of Today's Christian Entertainment called the track "a declaration that Jesus gets all the glory".

=== Style ===
"Jesus Be the Name" begins quietly and later comes to a large, congregational climax. Williams wrote that the song "starts off softly, declaring the depths of God's love to be sweet and endless", with Tiffany Hudson's vocal "on full display" as the arrangement gradually expands. Yap described the track as featuring "stirring melodies, dynamic instrumentation, and deeply reverent lyrics", capturing a live moment in which the congregation "united in one voice". The song had been recorded live at Elevation Church in September 2025, with Williams noting that it "resonated so powerfully with their home congregation" that the group chose to release it widely.

"Jesus Be the Name" is considered to be a contemporary worship ballad. The song is composed in the key of D flat, with a speed of 64 beats per minute and a time signature of 4/4.

== Reception ==
Professional ratings
Review scores
Source	Rating
Louder Than Music	4.5/5 stars

=== Critical ===
"Jesus Be the Name" received generally positive feedback from critics. Savage wrote that the song helped reorient his attention during a difficult week, noting that its declarations shifted his perspective toward Christ and describing the track as one that lifted his focus "from my struggles to my Savior". Yap described the single as a "heartfelt declaration of faith and surrender", emphasizing the way it captured a moment of unified worship during its live recording. Louder Than Music also responded favorably, calling it "a great worship song that could be used in a church worship setting" and praising its nine‑minute structure for feeling immersive rather than excessive.

=== Commercial ===
For the chart week of November 1, 2025, "Jesus Be the Name" debuted at number 12 on the Billboard Hot Christian Songs chart in the United States. On January 3, 2026, the song rose to reach its peak of number 11 on the chart. On the Christian Airplay chart, it debuted that week at number 35, and remained on the chart for one week.

== Track listing ==
No.	Title	Writer(s)	Producer(s)	Length
1.	"Jesus Be the Name" (featuring Tiffany Hudson)	Davide Mutendji; Mitch Wong; Steven Furtick; Hudson	Chris Brown; Scott Gardner; Furtick	8:59
2.	"I Know a Name" (featuring Brandon Lake)	Lake; Hank Bentley; Furtick; Jacob Scooter	Brown; Furtick	7:09

== Personnel ==
Credits adapted from Tidal Music.

=== Performers ===
- Andrew Joseph – background vocals
- Andria Alston – background vocals
- Brittany Diaz – background vocals
- Chris Brown – acoustic guitar, background vocals
- Davide Mutendji – background vocals
- E. Edwards – guitar
- Elevation Choir – background vocals
- Hannah Cheshire – background vocals
- Hannah Robinson – background vocals
- Isaiah Templeton – background vocals
- Jaleta Gardner – background vocals
- Jenna Barrientes – background vocals
- Joel Kreimeyer-Kelly – strings
- Joey Signa – guitar
- Josh Holiday – keyboards
- Jonsal Barrientes – background vocals
- L.J. Mitchell – organ
- Otis Williams – drums
- Scott Gardner – choirmaster, piano
- Shae Wooten – bass
- Tiffany Hudson – lead vocals
- Tori Elliot – background vocals
- Vincent Baynard – drums
- William Oakley – percussion

=== Technical ===
- Believe Kamba – engineer
- Bryan Soto – engineer
- Chris Brown – producer
- Davide Mutendji – writer
- Dustin Maxwell – engineer
- Graham King – engineer
- Ian Womack – engineer
- Jonathan Mix – engineer
- Josh Holiday – programmer
- Joshua Linker – engineer
- Mitch Wong – writer
- Nathan Decker – engineer
- Samuel Gibson – masterer
- Scott Gardner – producer
- Steven Furtick – producer, writer, executive producer
- Tiffany Hudson – writer
- William Oakley – engineer
- Zach King – engineer

== Charts ==
Chart performance for "Jesus Be the Name"
Chart (2025–2026)	Peak position
UK Christian & Gospel Albums (Official Charts)	3
US Christian Airplay (Billboard)	35
US Hot Christian Songs (Billboard)	10

== Certifications ==
Certifications for "Jesus Be the Name"
Region	Certification	Certified units/sales
United States (RIAA)	Gold	500,000^{‡}
^{‡} Sales+streaming figures based on certification alone.

== Release history ==
Release history and formats for "Jesus Be the Name"
Region	Date	Format(s)	Label(s)	Ref.
Various	October 17, 2025	Digital download; streaming	Elevation Worship Records	
Various	March 20, 2026	Digital download; streaming; CD; LP; (with So Be It)	Elevation Worship Records	
