= Blessing Offor =

American gospel singer

- Origin: Nashville, Tennessee, U.S.
- Genres: Gospel, Contemporary Christian Music
- Occupations: Singer-songwriter, musician
- Years active: 2007–present
- Label: Capitol CMG
- Website: blessingoffor.com

Blessing Offor is a Nigerian-born American gospel and contemporary Christian music singer and songwriter.

== Early life and career ==
Offor was born blind in one eye and with limited vision in the other due to congenital glaucoma. He and his uncle migrated to Connecticut, United States when Offor was six years old to treat the glaucoma and preserve his remaining eyesight. When he was 10, he went completely blind due to an accident. He started composing music on piano and learned to play songs from Stevie Wonder and Sam Cooke, his musical influences. He carried on with his career as a gospel musician and moved to Nashville to pursue music more and attend Belmont University.

Offor played at bars in his young adult years before competing on The Voice during its seventh season in 2014, where he joined team Pharrell Williams and later Adam Levine, before getting eliminated in the show's third round.

Offor regularly performs at the Kennedy Center to help spread awareness about artists with disabilities. In 2022 he released the single "Brighter Days", accompanied by an album of the same name. The song reached 17 on the Billboard Top 20 at the time. It also reached No. 25 on the mainstream Adult Contemporary chart. It additionally reached No. 1 on the Billboard Top TV songs chart.

In 2023, Offor released a duet with fellow Christian singer, TobyMac called "The Goodness", and a solo single "My Tribe", which peaked at number 2 on the Billboard Christian AirPlay for seven weeks. "My Tribe" pays tribute to his sister, Mercy, who died December 29, 2022, and to his home country, Nigeria.

Later that year, his song "Believe" reached number 23, on Christian Top 40 and in November 2023 was nominated for the Best Contemporary Christian Music Performance/Song at the 66th Annual Grammy Awards. Offor also received a nomination for the Grammy Award for Best Contemporary Christian Music Album with his album, My Tribe. It reached No. 6 on the Billboard Top Christian Albums chart and No. 20 on the Top Current Digital Album Sales and Official Charts UK Top Christian/Gospel charts. Later that year, his song "Wonderful Christmastime", a Paul McCartney cover, reached #1 on the Billboard AC Monitered and Airplay charts.

== Awards and nominations ==
In 2010, he won the International Young Soloists Award from VSA.

=== GMA Dove Awards ===
| Year | Nominee / work | Award | Result | Ref. |
|---|---|---|---|---|
| 2022 | Blessing Offor | New Artist of the Year | Nominated | |
| 2023 | "Brighter Days" | Pop/Contemporary Recorded Song of the Year | Won | |
| 2023 | My Tribe | Pop/Contemporary Album of the Year | Nominated | |
| 2023 | "The Goodness" (with TobyMac) | Short Form Video of the Year (Performance) | Won | |

== Discography ==
=== Studio albums ===
| Title | Details | Peak chart positions |
| Title | Details | US Christ |
|---|---|---|
| Guilty Pleasure | Released: September 24, 2014; Label: IMI/Larue; Formats: Digital Download | — |
| Roots | Released: February 10, 2015; Label: Sojourn Records; Formats: Digital download, streaming | — |
| Brighter Days | Released: February 25, 2022; Label: Capitol CMG; Formats: Digital Download, streaming | — |
| My Tribe | Released: January 15, 2023; Label: Capitol CMG; Formats: CD, LP, digital download, streaming | 6 |
| Real | Released: August 8, 2025; Label: Bowyer & Bow, Capitol CMG; Formats: CD, LP, digital download, streaming | — |

=== Extended plays ===
| Title | Details |
|---|---|
| How Much You Mean to Me | Released: January 28, 2022; Label: Capitol CMG; Formats: Digital Download |
| Snow Globe | Released: November 15, 2024; Label: Capitol CMG; Formats: Digital Download |
| Covers | Released: December 6, 2024; Label: Capitol CMG; Formats: Digital Download |
| Morning | Released: May 16, 2025; Label: Capitol CMG; Formats: Digital download |
| To All a Good Night | Released: November 7, 2025; Label: Capitol CMG; Formats: Digital download |

=== Singles ===
| Title | Year | Peak chart positions | | | | | | Certifications | Album |
| Title | Year | US | US TV | US AC | US Pop | US Christ | US Christ Air | Certifications | Album |
|---|---|---|---|---|---|---|---|---|---|
| "Say Yes" | 2008 | — | — | — | — | — | | | Guilty Pleasure |
| "Songs for Guiding Eyes" | 2013 | — | — | — | — | — | | | Non-album single |
| "Loving Each Other" | 2013 | — | — | — | — | — | | | Roots |
| "This Life" | 2015 | — | — | — | — | 13 | 5 (Note: "This Life" additionally charted at No. 9 on the Billboard Christian Adult Contemporary Airplay chart) | | Roots |
| "Hey World" (with Lee Brice) | 2020 | — | — | — | — | — | — | | Hey World |
| "Tin Roof" | 2021 | — (Note: "Tin Roof" did not enter the Billboard Hot 100, but peaked at No. 15 on the Billboard Bubbling Under Hot 100) | — | — | — | 17 | 2 (Note: "Tin Roof" additionally charted at No. 16 on the Billboard Christian Adult Contemporary Airplay chart) | | Brighter Days |
| "Brighter Days" | 2021 | — | 5 | 24 | 17 | 2 | 2 | RIAA: Gold | Brighter Days My Tribe |
| "Your Love" | 2022 | — | — | — | — | 30 | 18 | | My Tribe |
| "Feel Good" | 2022 | — | — | — | — | — | — | | My Tribe |
| "Won't Be Long Now" | 2022 | — | — | — | — | — | — | | My Tribe |
| "My Tribe" | 2022 | — | — | — | — | — | 2 | | My Tribe |
| "Rollin'" | 2022 | — | — | — | — | 22 | — | | My Tribe |
| "The Goodness" (with TobyMac) | 2022 | — | — | — | — | 1 | 1 | RIAA: Gold | Life After Death |
| "Look Up to the Sky" (with Lathan Warlick) | 2023 | — | — | — | — | — | — | | Lets Be Honest EP |
| "Thats the Thing About Praise" (with Benjamin William Hastings) | 2023 | — | — | — | — | 21 | 14 | | Benjamin William Hastings |
| "Somebody's Child" (with Dolly Parton) | 2024 | — | — | — | — | 41 | — | | Real |
| "Autobahn" | 2024 | — | — | — | — | — | — | | Non-album single |
| "Jordans" | 2024 | — | — | — | — | 44 | 16 (Note: "Jordans" additionally charted at No. 15 on the Billboard Christian Adult Contemporary Airplay chart) | | Real |
| "All Over the World" | 2024 | — | — | — | — | — | — | | Real |
| "Lift Me Up" | 2025 | — | — | — | — | 22 | 7 | | Real |
| "Crying Out Loud" | 2025 | — | — | — | — | — | — | | Real |

=== Other charted songs ===
| Title | Year | Peak chart positions | | Album |
| Title | Year | US Christ | US Christ Air | Album |
|---|---|---|---|---|
| "Believe" | 2022 | 9 | 7 | Brighter Days My Tribe |
| "Godspeed" (Frank Ocean cover) | 2023 | 33 | — | Covers |
| "Wonderful Christmastime" (Paul McCartney cover) | 2023 | 17 | 1 | Snow Globe |
| "Snow Globe" | 2024 | 24 | 27 | Snow Globe |
