= My Tribe =

Studio album by Blessing Offor
- Released: January 13, 2023
- Genres: Christian contemporary; gospel; soul; pop; R&B
- Length: 45:11
- Label: Capitol CMG

Blessing Offor chronology
Brighter Days (2022)	My Tribe (2023)

Alternative cover

Singles from My Tribe
- 1. "Brighter Days" Released: October 14, 2021; 2. "Believe" Released: February 25, 2022; 3. "My Tribe" Released: August 12, 2022; 4. "Your Love" Released: August 21, 2022; 5. "Feel Good" Released: November 18, 2022; 6. "Won't Be Long Now" Released: December 9, 2022; 7. "Rollin'" Released: January 10, 2023

My Tribe is the fourth studio album by Nigerian-born American Christian Music artist Blessing Offor. The album was released on January 13, 2023, through Capitol Christian Music Group, on CD, LP and digital download formats. The album is the biggest streaming debut for a male artist on Capitol CMG.

The tracks "Brighter Days", "Believe", "Your Love", "Feel Good", "Won't Be Long Now", "My Tribe", and "Rollin'" were released as singles. The lead single, "Brighter Days" achieved significant chart positions, reaching No. 2 on the Billboard Hot Christian Songs and Christian Airplay charts. It reached No. 17 on the Pop Airplay and No. 20 on the Mainstream Adult Contemporary. A deluxe edition of the album was released, featuring three additional tracks. The songs "Believe" and "Brighter Days" were both included on Offor's previous album Brighter Days, released February 25, 2022.

An extended edition of the album was also released, featuring three additional tracks.

== Track listing ==
Original edition
No.	Title	Writer(s)	Producer(s)	Length
1.	"Intro"	Blessing Offor	Cleve; Baby	0:41
2.	"Brighter Days"	Blessing Offor; Sam Ellis	Sam Ellis	3:28
3.	"Your Love"	Blessing Offor; Todd Clark	Todd Clark	2:38
4.	"Feel Good"	Blessing Offor; Max Stark	Max Stark	3:39
5.	"Wannabe"	Bessing Offor; AJ Pruis; Max Stark	Max Stark	3:01
6.	"Believe"	Blessing Offor; Hank Bentley	Hank Bentley	3:13
7.	"Rollin'"	Blessing Offor; Jordan Sapp; Paul Duncan	Jordan Sapp	3:18
8.	"Grace"	Blessing Offor	Josh Ronen	3:44
9.	"Won't Be Long Now"	Blessing Offor; Hank Bentley; Jessie Early	Hank Bentley	3:15
10.	"What A World (Akwa Uwa) Pt. 1"	Ferdinand Dan-Satch Emeka Opara	Cleve; Baby	0:57
11.	"My Tribe"	Blessing Offor; Jess Cates; Max Stark	Max Stark	3:03
12.	"I'll Take It"	Blessing Offor; Jamie Kenney; Mike Robinson	Jamie Kenney; Mike Robinson	3:26
13.	"Look At Love"	Blessing Offor; Max Stark	Max Stark	3:21
14.	"What A World (Akwa Uwa) Pt. 2"	Ferdinand Dan-Satch Emeka Opara	Cleve; Baby	0:38
15.	"Last For Now"	Blessing Offor; Jae Stephens; Ryan Tutton	Ryan Tutton	3:17
16.	"Looking for God"	Blessing Offor; Dan Muckala	Dan Muckala	3:26
Total length:				45:11

Deluxe edition
No.	Title	Writer(s)	Producer(s)	Length
1.	"Intro"	Blessing Offor	Cleve; Baby	0:41
2.	"Brighter Days"	Blessing Offor; Sam Ellis	Sam Ellis	3:28
3.	"Your Love"	Blessing Offor; Todd Clark	Todd Clark	2:38
4.	"Feel Good"	Blessing Offor; Max Stark	Max Stark	3:39
5.	"Wannabe"	Bessing Offor; AJ Pruis; Max Stark	Max Stark	3:01
6.	"Believe"	Blessing Offor; Hank Bentley	Hank Bentley	3:13
7.	"Rollin'"	Blessing Offor; Jordan Sapp; Paul Duncan	Jordan Sapp	3:18
8.	"Grace"	Blessing Offor	Josh Ronen	3:44
9.	"Won't Be Long Now"	Blessing Offor; Hank Bentley; Jessie Early	Hank Bentley	3:15
10.	"What A World (Akwa Uwa) Pt. 1"	Ferdinand Dan-Satch Emeka Opara	Cleve; Baby	0:57
11.	"My Tribe"	Blessing Offor; Jess Cates; Max Stark	Max Stark	3:03
12.	"I'll Take It"	Blessing Offor; Jamie Kenney; Mike Robinson	Jamie Kenney; Mike Robinson	3:26
13.	"Look At Love"	Blessing Offor; Max Stark	Max Stark	3:21
14.	"What A World (Akwa Uwa) Pt. 2"	Ferdinand Dan-Satch Emeka Opara	Cleve; Baby	0:38
15.	"Last For Now"	Blessing Offor; Jae Stephens; Ryan Tutton	Ryan Tutton	3:17
16.	"Looking for God"	Blessing Offor; Dan Muckala	Dan Muckala	3:26
17.	"Good Good"	Blessing Offor; Henk Bentley; Jess Cates	Hank Bentley	2:43
18.	"Amen"	Blessing Offor; Cleve Wilson	Cleve; Baby	3:01
19.	"Same Clouds"	Blessing Offor; Brandon Heath; Max Stark	Max Stark	3:30
Total length:				45:11

== Charts ==
=== Weekly charts ===
Chart (2023)	Peak position
US Top Christian Albums (Billboard)	1
US Current Album Sales (Billboard)	20
UK Christian/Gospel Albums (Official Charts)	20

=== Year--end charts ===
Chart (2023)	Peak position
US Top Christian Albums (Billboard)	50

=== Singles ===
Song	Chart (2021)	Peak position
"Brighter Days"	Adult Contemporary (Billboard)	25

Song	Chart (2021)	Peak position
"Brighter Days"	Top TV Songs (Billboard)	5

Song	Chart (2021)	Peak position
"Brighter Days"	Pop Airplay (Billboard)	17

Song	Chart (2021–2023)	Peak position
"Brighter Days"	Hot Christian Songs (Billboard)	2
"Believe"	Hot Christian Songs (Billboard)	9
"Your Love"	Hot Christian Songs (Billboard)	30
"Rollin'"	Hot Christian Songs (Billboard)	22

Song	Chart (2021–2023)	Peak position
"Brighter Days"	Christian Airplay (Billboard)	2
"Believe"	Christian Airplay (Billboard)	7
"Your Love"	Christian Airplay (Billboard)	18
"My Tribe"	Christian Airplay (Billboard)	2

== Notes ==
- "Feel Good" was released as a single, but did not enter any charts
- "Won't Be Long Now" was released as a single, but did not enter any charts
