= Brighter Day =

Brighter Day may refer to:

- Brighter Day (album), a 2005 studio album by Troy Cassar-Daley
- "Brighter Day" (song), a 2014 song by Namie Amuro

== See also ==
- The Brighter Day, an American daytime soap opera which aired from 1954 to 1962
- Brighter Days (disambiguation)
