= On Repeat (Hillsong United song) =

2022 single by Hillsong United

Single by Hillsong United
- Released: 21 January 2022
- Genre: Contemporary worship music
- Length: 4:31
- Label: Hillsong Music; Capitol CMG
- Songwriters: Aodhan King; Ben Fielding; Benjamin Hastings; Joel Houston
- Producers: Michael Guy Chislett; Joel Houston

Hillsong United singles chronology
"Sure Thing" (2021)	"On Repeat" (2022)

Music videos
- "On Repeat" on YouTube
- "On Repeat" (Lyrics) on YouTube

"On Repeat" is a song performed by Australian contemporary worship band Hillsong United. It was on 21 January 2022, as the third single from their sixth studio album, Are We There Yet? (2022). The song was written by Benjamin Hastings, and Joel Houston. Michael Guy Chislett and Joel Houston handled the production of the single.

"On Repeat" peaked at No. 34 on the US Hot Christian Songs chart.

== Background ==
Hillsong United released "On Repeat" as a single on 21 January 2022, following the release of the singles "Know You Will" and "Sure Thing" in 2021. Joel Houston of Hillsong United shared the story behind the song, saying:

The simplicity of the Gospel works itself out daily in tangible and significant ways. In our lives there's a parallel of grace being on repeat, and then praise being on repeat as our response to God's grace. It's so simple yet profound and encourages me to believe that God's going to give me the grace, so I'm going to give Him the praise knowing that He's going to give me the grace again. I think that's true for anybody anywhere, regardless of their story, what season they're in, or how life looks like – and I pray it never gets lost on us.

== Composition ==
"On Repeat" is composed in the key of C with a tempo of 68 beats per minute and a musical time signature of 4/4.

== Critical reception ==
Jono Davies of Louder Than The Music gave a positive review of "On Repeat," saying "In recent years Hillsong United have produced songs that are stripped back, leaving the song in its most raw form straying away from more studio creativity and this has worked well for them, and this song is no different. If anything this works better for a song like this, I think in a live setting this song will come into its own."

== Commercial performance ==
"On Repeat" debuted at number 34 on the US Hot Christian Songs chart dated 5 February 2022.

== Music videos ==
On 21 January 2022, Hillsong United released the official lyric video for "On Repeat" via YouTube. On 23 February 2022, Hillsong United punlished the official music video for "On Repeat" through YouTube.

== Personnel ==
Credits adapted from AllMusic.

- Michael Guy Chislett — acoustic guitar, electric guitar, producer
- Matt Crocker — background vocals
- Jonathan Douglass — background vocals
- Andrea García A&R
- Taya Gaukrodger — vocals
- Jad Gillies — vocals
- Bruno Gruel — mastering engineer
- Nigel Hendroff — acoustic guitar
- Hillsong United — primary artist
- Joel Houston — background vocals, executive producer, keyboards, producer, programmer
- Tahisha Hunt — background vocals
- Simon Kobler — percussion
- Daniel McMurray — drums
- Johnny Rays — management
- Ben Tan — programmer
- Benjamin Tennikoff — bass, drums, keyboards, programmer
- Matt Tennikoff — bass
- Dylan Thomas — electric guitar
- Ben Whincop — mixing engineer
- Chris York — A&R
- Michael Zuvela — programmer

== Charts ==
Chart performance for "On Repeat"
Chart (2022)	Peak position
US Hot Christian Songs (Billboard)	34

== Release history ==
Release history and formats for "On Repeat"
Region	Date	Format	Label	Ref.
Various	21 January 2022	Digital download; streaming	Hillsong Music; Capitol Christian Music Group	
United States	17 June 2022	Christian radio	Hillsong Music; Capitol Christian Music Group	
