= I Got Saved =

Song by Elevation Worship and Chris Brown

from the album So Be It
- Released: February 20, 2026
- Recorded: September 2025
- Venue: Elevation Church
- Length: 5:14
- Label: Elevation Worship Records
- Songwriters: Brandon Lake; Jacob Sooter; Pat Barrett; Steven Furtick
- Producers: Chris Brown; Sooter; Furtick

Music videos
- "I Got Saved" on YouTube
- "I Got Saved" (Lyrics) on YouTube

"I Got Saved" is a song by the American contemporary worship music collective Elevation Worship, featuring singer Chris Brown. The song was recorded live at Elevation Church in September 2025. It was released on February 20, 2026, as a member of the collective's album So Be It. "I Got Saved" was written by Brandon Lake, Jacob Sooter, Pat Barrett, and Steven Furtick, while production was handled by Brown, Sooter, and Furtick.

== Composition ==
"I Got Saved" was led by Chris Brown. The song is a reflective testimony piece centered on the moment of Brown's salvation. Its lyrics focus on the performer's identity and renewal in becoming Christian, contrasting it with the rest of the project's energetic worship. The arrangement have been noted for their contemplative tone that gradually expands to become louder, particularly in the bridge section, where the theme of receiving a "brand new name" is emphasized by the live vocal response of the room. Michael Carder of Jesus Freak Hideout described the track as "simple, reflective, and incredibly effective", noting its ability to communicate its message without unnecessary production additions. The song's arrangement is restrained, as opposed to the album's larger anthemic moments. Timothy Yap of JubileeCast labelled "I Got Saved" as the album's "most compelling" moment, highlighting its melody and the strength of its thematic focus.

Critics also observed how the song's musical and lyrical choices align with Elevation Worship's broader stylistic identity. Carder placed "I Got Saved" among the tracks that fit well into church worship settings. The track centers on themes of redemption, spiritual awakening, and personal testimony, articulating the joy and liberation associated with salvation. Its lyrics are focused on a transformative encounter with grace, inviting listeners to reflect on their own spiritual journeys. Stylistically, the song contains an organic, congregational feel.

== Reception ==
=== Critical ===
"I Got Saved" received notable acclaim from critics and was widely regarded as one of the most prominent songs on So Be It. Carder called it "the most compelling track on the record and a clear prime cut", observing its sincerity and warmth with which it revisits the moment of salvation. He noted that the bridge carries "authentic congregational energy", and argued that the song's impact comes from feeling "personal before it becomes corporate". Yap similarly identified the song as one of the project's best moments, commending its emotional resonance and the strength of its live delivery. Yap described "I Got Saved" as a track that resonates more deeply due to its sincerity of its theme.

=== Commercial ===
Within its first charting frame, "I Got Saved" debuted at its peak position of number 16 on the Billboard Hot Christian Songs chart in the United States. The song became the highest charting album track from So Be It, excluding singles and promotional singles.

== Personnel ==
Credits adapted from Tidal.

=== Performers ===
- Andrew Joseph – background vocals
- Andria Alston – background vocals
- Brittany Diaz – background vocals
- Chris Brown – acoustic guitar, lead vocals
- Davide Mutendji – background vocals
- E. Edwards – guitar
- Elevation Choir – background vocals
- Hannah Cheshire – background vocals
- Hannah Robinson – background vocals
- Isaiah Templeton – background vocals
- Jaleta Gardner – background vocals
- Jenna Barrientes – background vocals
- Joel Kreimeyer-Kelly – strings
- Joey Signa – guitar
- Josh Holiday – keyboards
- Jonsal Barrientes – background vocals
- L.J. Mitchell – organ
- Otis Williams – drums
- Scott Gardner – choirmaster, piano
- Shae Wooten – bass
- Tori Elliot – background vocals
- Vincent Baynard – drums
- William Oakley – percussion

=== Technical ===
- Believe Kamba – engineer
- Brandon Lake – writer
- Bryan Soto – engineer
- Chris Brown – producer
- Dustin Maxwell – engineer
- Graham King – engineer
- Ian Womack – engineer
- Jacob Sooter – writer, producer
- Jonathan Mix – engineer
- Josh Holiday – programmer
- Joshua Linker – engineer
- Nathan Decker – engineer
- Pat Barrett – writer
- Samuel Gibson – masterer
- Scott Gardner – producer
- Steven Furtick – producer, writer, executive producer
- William Oakley – engineer
- Zach King – engineer

== Charts ==
Chart performance for "I Got Saved"
| Chart (2026) | Peak position |
|---|---|
| US Hot Christian Songs (Billboard) | 16 |
