= Benjamin William Hastings (album) =

Studio album by Benjamin William Hastings
- Released: November 4, 2022
- Genres: Christian contemporary, pop
- Length: 1:16:34
- Label: Capitol CMG
- Producer: various

Benjamin William Hastings chronology
Benjamin William Hastings (2022)	Sold out, sincerely (2024)

Alternative cover
- Deluxe Edition album cover

Alternative cover
- Songwriters Edition album cover

Singles from Benjamin William Hastings
- 1. "Homeward // Faith Is" Released: October 2021; 2. "The Jesus I Know" Released: January 2022; 3. "Anyway" Released: May 2022; 4. "A Fathers Blessing" Released: June 2022; 5. "Feels Like a Blessing" Released: July 2022; 6. "Eden (Isn't It Just Like You?)" Released: September 2022; 7. "So Help Me God" Released: October 2022; 8. "That's the Thing About Praise" Released: February 2023

Professional ratings
Review scores
Source	Rating
Jesus Freak Hideout	4/5 stars

Benjamin William Hastings is the debut self-titled studio album by Northern Irish singer-songwriter Benjamin William Hastings. The album was released on Capitol CMG on November 4, 2022. Lyrically, the album is about Hastings' own personal struggles. On January 20, 2023, a 50-track "songwriters edition" was released, including a commentary of each of the album's original songs. On March 17, 2023, he released a 39-track deluxe edition titled Benjamin William Hastings (And Then Some), which featured fourteen tracks of bonus material. The song "That's the Thing About Praise" (with Blessing Offor) reached significant chart position, at #21 on the Billboard Hot Christian Songs and #15 on the Christian Airplay charts.

== Critical reception ==
Speaking for Jesus Freak Hideout, Joel Zaloum gave the album a four-out-of-five-star rating, criticizing the album for being "purposefully extraneous", but praising Hastings' songwriting, as he "writes with his heart".

== Track listing ==
Original edition
No.	Title	Writer(s)	Length
1.	"Hold Onto Your Hats"	Benjamin William Hastings, Michael Fatkin	1:52
2.	"Feels Like a Blessing" (with Judah.)	Benjamin William Hastings, Ben Fielding, Judah Akers	3:22
3.	"Dancing with My Shadow"	Benjamin William Hastings, Joel Houston	3:34
4.	"Who's Eden?"	Benjamin William Hastings	0:11
5.	"Eden (Isn't It Just Like You?)"	Benjamin William Hastings, Joel Houston, Michael Fatkin, Brandon Lake, Hank Bentley, Aodhan King, Dylan Thomas	4:35
6.	"Not Even Once"	Benjamin William Hastings, Hank Bentley	3:38
7.	"Giveth"	Benjamin William Hastings, Hank Bentley, Annie Johnson Flint	1:27
8.	"The Jesus I Know"	Benjamin William Hastings, Paul Mabury, Tommy Iceland	2:38
9.	"Homeward"	Benjamin William Hastings, Ben Fielding, Bryan Fowler	4:56
10.	"A Fathers Blessing"	Benjamin William Hastings, Dylan Thomas, Joel Houston	4:40
11.	"A Message to My Wife"	Benjamin William Hastings	1:22
12.	"The Someone"	Benjamin William Hastings, David Leonard	2:55
13.	"Boy on the Moon"	Benjamin William Hastings, Benjamin Tan	4:02
14.	"The Pain You Let Me Feel"	Benjamin William Hastings, Josh Grimmet	1:13
15.	"Anyway"	Benjamin William Hastings, Chris Davenport, David Leonard, Josh Grimmett	5:13
16.	"Only One Response" (with David Leonard)	Benjamin William Hastings, David Leonard, Josh Grimmett	2:13
17.	"While I'm in the Wind"	Benjamin William Hastings, Aodhan Kind, Jeremy Lutito	3:26
18.	"Enough!?"	Benjamin William Hastings, Michael Fatkin	4:18
19.	"Faith Is"	Benjamin William Hastings, Jon Guerra	4:36
20.	"Jesus What You Think?"	Benjamin William Hastings	0:38
21.	"Cathedrals of the Nelder Grove"	Benjamin William Hastings, Justin Amundrud	4:20
22.	"That's the Thing About Praise" (with Blessing Offor)	Benjamin William Hastings, Hank Bentley, Blessing Offor	3:57
23.	"Anàstasis"	Benjamin William Hastings, Dean Ussher, Marty Sampson	1:51
24.	"So Help Me God"	Benjamin William Hastings, Hank Bentley, Joel Houston	2:56
25.	"Glaciers & Rain"	Benjamin William Hastings, Hank Bentley, Joel Houston	1:32
Total length:			1:16:34

Deluxe edition
No.	Title	Writer(s)	Length
1.	"Hold Onto Your Hats"	Benjamin William Hastings, Michael Fatkin	1:52
2.	"Feels Like a Blessing" (with Judah.)	Benjamin William Hastings, Ben Fielding, Judah Akers	3:22
3.	"Dancing with My Shadow"	Benjamin William Hastings, Joel Houston	3:34
4.	"Who's Eden?"	Benjamin William Hastings	0:11
5.	"Eden (Isn't It Just Like You?)"	Benjamin William Hastings, Joel Houston, Michael Fatkin, Brandon Lake, Hank Bentley, Aodhan King, Dylan Thomas	4:35
6.	"Not Even Once"	Benjamin William Hastings, Hank Bentley	3:38
7.	"Giveth"	Benjamin William Hastings, Hank Bentley, Annie Johnson Flint	1:27
8.	"The Jesus I Know"	Benjamin William Hastings, Paul Mabury, Tommy Iceland	2:38
9.	"Homeward"	Benjamin William Hastings, Ben Fielding, Bryan Fowler	4:56
10.	"A Fathers Blessing"	Benjamin William Hastings, Dylan Thomas, Joel Houston	4:40
11.	"A Message to My Wife"	Benjamin William Hastings	1:22
12.	"The Someone"	Benjamin William Hastings, David Leonard	2:55
13.	"Boy on the Moon"	Benjamin William Hastings, Benjamin Tan	4:02
14.	"The Pain You Let Me Feel"	Benjamin William Hastings, Josh Grimmet	1:13
15.	"Anyway"	Benjamin William Hastings, Chris Davenport, David Leonard, Josh Grimmett	5:13
16.	"Only One Response" (with David Leonard)	Benjamin William Hastings, David Leonard, Josh Grimmett	2:13
17.	"While I'm in the Wind"	Benjamin William Hastings, Aodhan Kind, Jeremy Lutito	3:26
18.	"Enough!?"	Benjamin William Hastings, Michael Fatkin	4:18
19.	"Faith Is"	Benjamin William Hastings, Jon Guerra	4:36
20.	"Jesus What You Think?"	Benjamin William Hastings	0:38
21.	"Cathedrals of the Nelder Grove"	Benjamin William Hastings, Justin Amundrud	4:20
22.	"That's the Thing About Praise" (with Blessing Offor)	Benjamin William Hastings, Hank Bentley, Blessing Offor	3:57
23.	"Anàstasis"	Benjamin William Hastings, Dean Ussher, Marty Sampson	1:51
24.	"So Help Me God"	Benjamin William Hastings, Hank Bentley, Joel Houston	2:56
25.	"Glaciers & Rain"	Benjamin William Hastings, Hank Bentley, Joel Houston	1:32
26.	"Dragons"	Benjamin William Hastings	3:06
27.	"Seasons"	Benjamin William Hastings, Chris Davenport	4:29
28.	"Eden (Isn't it Just Like You?)" (acoustic)	Benjamin William Hastings, Joel Houston, Michael Fatkin, Brandon Lake, Hank Bentley, Aodhan King, Dylan Thomas	4:26
29.	"Faith Is" (acoustic)	Benjamin William Hastings, Jon Guerra	4:35
30.	"While I'm in the Wind" (acoustic)	Benjamin William Hastings, Aodhan Kind, Jeremy Lutito	3:18
31.	"A Father's Blessing" (acoustic)	Benjamin William Hastings, Dylan Thomas, Joel Houston	4:41
32.	"Not Even Once" (acoustic)	Benjamin William Hastings, Hank Bentley	6:10
33.	"Anyway" (acoustic, with David Leonard)	Benjamin William Hastings, Chris Davenport, David Leonard, Josh Grimmett	6:52
34.	"Homeward" (acoustic)	Benjamin William Hastings, Ben Fielding, Bryan Fowler	5:06
35.	"That's the Thing About Praise" (acoustic)	Benjamin William Hastings, Hank Bentley, Blessing Offor	3:39
36.	"So Help Me God" (acoustic)	Benjamin William Hastings, Hank Bentley, Joel Houston	2:45
37.	"Eden (Isn't It Just Like You?)" (live)	Benjamin William Hastings, Joel Houston, Michael Fatkin, Brandon Lake, Hank Bentley, Aodhan King, Dylan Thomas	4:41
38.	"Not Even Once" (live)	Benjamin William Hastings, Hank Bentley	4:07
39.	"Anyway" (live)	Benjamin William Hastings, Chris Davenport, David Leonard, Josh Grimmett	6:37
Total length:			2:29:38

Songwriters edition
No.	Title	Writer(s)	Length
1.	"Hold Onto Your Hats" (commentary)	Benjamin William Hastings, Michael Fatkin	1:55
2.	"Hold Onto Your Hats"	Benjamin William Hastings, Michael Fatkin	1:52
3.	"Feels Like a Blessing" (commentary)	Benjamin William Hastings, Ben Fielding, Judah Akers	5:48
4.	"Feels Like a Blessing" (with JUDAH.)	Benjamin William Hastings, Ben Fielding, Judah Akers	3:22
5.	"Dancing With My Shadow" (commentary)	Benjamin William Hastings, Joel Houston	6:19
6.	"Dancing With My Shadow"	Benjamin William Hastings, Joel Houston	3:34
7.	"Who's Eden?" (commentary)	Benjamin William Hastings	3:34
8.	"Who's Eden?"	Benjamin William Hastings	0:11
9.	"Eden (Isn't it Just Like You?)" (commentary)	Benjamin William Hastings, Joel Houston, Michael Fatkin, Brandon Lake, Hank Bentley, Aodhan King, Dylan Thomas	6:59
10.	"Eden (Isn't it Just Like You?)"	Benjamin William Hastings, Joel Houston, Michael Fatkin, Brandon Lake, Hank Bentley, Aodhan King, Dylan Thomas	4:35
11.	"Not Even Once" (commentary)	Benjamin William Hastings, Hank Bentley	5:35
12.	"Not Even Once"	Benjamin William Hastings, Hank Bentley	3:38
13.	"Giveth" (commentary)	Benjamin William Hastings, Hank Bentley, Annie Johnson Flint	1:46
14.	"Giveth"	Benjamin William Hastings, Hank Bentley, Annie Johnson Flint	1:27
15.	"The Jesus I Know" (commentary)	Benjamin William Hastings, Paul Mabury, Tommy Iceland	5:33
16.	"The Jesus I Know"	Benjamin William Hastings, Paul Mabury, Tommy Iceland	2:38
17.	"Homeward" (commentary)	Benjamin William Hastings, Ben Fielding, Bryan Fowler	3:02
18.	"Homeward"	Benjamin William Hastings, Ben Fielding, Bryan Fowler	4:56
19.	"A Fathers Blessing" (commentary)	Benjamin William Hastings, Dylan Thomas, Joel Houston	5:08
20.	"A Fathers Blessing"	Benjamin William Hastings, Dylan Thomas, Joel Houston	4:40
21.	"A Message to My Wife" (commentary)	Benjamin William Hastings	3:39
22.	"A Message to My Wife"	Benjamin William Hastings	1:22
23.	"The Someone" (commentary)	Benjamin William Hastings, David Leonard	3:05
24.	"The Someone"	Benjamin William Hastings, David Leonard	2:55
25.	"Boy on the Moon" (commentary)	Benjamin William Hastings, Benjamin Tan	4:04
26.	"Boy on the Moon"	Benjamin William Hastings, Benjamin Tan	4:02
27.	"The Pain You Let me Feel" (commentary)	Benjamin William Hastings, Josh Grimmet	5:00
28.	"The Pain You Let me Feel"	Benjamin William Hastings, Josh Grimmet	1:13
29.	"Anyway" (commentary)	Benjamin William Hastings, Chris Davenport, David Leonard, Josh Grimmett	1:44
30.	"Anyway"	Benjamin William Hastings, Chris Davenport, David Leonard, Josh Grimmett	5:13
31.	"Only One Response" (with David Leonard)	Benjamin William Hastings, David Leonard, Josh Grimmett	1:35
32.	"Only One Response" (with David Leonard)	Benjamin William Hastings, David Leonard, Josh Grimmett	2:13
33.	"While I'm in the Wind" (commentary)	Benjamin William Hastings, Aodhan Kind, Jeremy Lutito	2:47
34.	"While I'm in the Wind"	Benjamin William Hastings, Aodhan Kind, Jeremy Lutito	3:26
35.	"Enough!?" (commentary)	Benjamin William Hastings, Michael Fatkin	2:07
36.	"Enough!?"	Benjamin William Hastings, Michael Fatkin	4:18
37.	"Faith Is" (commentary)	Benjamin William Hastings, Jon Guerra	4:09
38.	"Faith Is"	Benjamin William Hastings, Jon Guerra	4:36
39.	"Jesus What You Think?" (commentary)	Benjamin William Hastings	0:39
40.	"Jesus What You Think?"	Benjamin William Hastings	0:38
41.	"Cathedrals of the Nelder Grove" (commentary)	Benjamin William Hastings, Justin Amundrud	9:37
42.	"Cathedrals of the Nelder Grove"	Benjamin William Hastings, Justin Amundrud	4:20
43.	"That's the Thing About Praise" (commentary)	Benjamin William Hastings, Hank Bentley, Blessing Offor	5:26
44.	"That's the Thing About Praise" (with Blessing Offor)	Benjamin William Hastings, Hank Bentley, Blessing Offor	3:57
45.	"Anàstasis" (commentary)	Benjamin William Hastings, Dean Ussher, Marty Sampson	5:59
46.	"Anàstasis"	Benjamin William Hastings, Dean Ussher, Marty Sampson	1:51
47.	"So Help Me God" (commentary)	Benjamin William Hastings, Hank Bentley, Joel Houston	6:31
48.	"So Help Me God"	Benjamin William Hastings, Hank Bentley, Joel Houston	2:56
49.	"Glaciers & Rain" (commentary)	Benjamin William Hastings, Hank Bentley, Joel Houston	2:56
50.	"Glaciers & Rain"	Benjamin William Hastings, Hank Bentley, Joel Houston	1:32
Total length:			2:53:13
