= Know You Will =

2021 single by Hillsong United

Single by Hillsong United

from the album Are We There Yet?
- Released: 9 July 2021
- Genre: Contemporary worship music
- Length: 3:37
- Label: Hillsong Music; Capitol CMG
- Songwriters: Joel Houston; Benjamin Hastings; Dylan Thomas
- Producers: Michael Guy Chislett; Joel Houston

Hillsong United singles chronology
"Another in the Fire" (2020)	"Know You Will" (2021)	"Sure Thing" (2021)

Music videos
- "Know You Will" on YouTube
- "Know You Will" (Acoustic) on YouTube
- "Know You Will" (Lyrics) on YouTube

"Know You Will" is a song performed by Australian contemporary worship band Hillsong United. It was released on 9 July 2021, as the lead single from their sixth studio album, Are We There Yet? (2022). The song was written by Benjamin Hastings, Dylan Thomas, and Joel Houston. Michael Guy Chislett and Joel Houston handled the production of the single.

"Know You Will" peaked at No. 23 on the US Hot Christian Songs chart. The song received a GMA Dove Award nomination for Worship Recorded Song of the Year at the 2022 GMA Dove Awards.

== Background ==
Hillsong United released "Know You Will" as a single on 9 July 2021. Joel Houston shared the story behind the song, saying:

"Know You Will" speaks into the nature of where we’ve been for the last 18 months—uncharted territory. It has been a crazy year for the world in a lot of ways. Faith can sometimes seem like a distant thing, but it becomes real when everything that you didn’t realize you were dependent on gets thrown on its head.

== Composition ==
"Know You Will" is composed in the key of E with a tempo of 64 beats per minute and a musical time signature of 4/4.

== Accolades ==
Awards
Year	Organization	Award	Result	Ref
2022	GMA Dove Awards	Worship Recorded Song of the Year	Nominated	

== Commercial performance ==
"Know You Will" debuted at number 23 on the US Hot Christian Songs chart dated 24 July 2021, concurrently debuting at number 48 on the Christian Airplay chart, and at number 16 on the Christian Digital Song Sales chart that same week.

== Music videos ==
On 9 July 2021, Hillsong United released the official music video of "Know You Will" together with the lyric video via YouTube. The official acoustic performance video of the song was released on 27 August 2021, via YouTube.

== Track listing ==
Know You Will
No.	Title	Writer(s)	Length
1.	"Know You Will"	Benjamin Hastings; Dylan Thomas; Joel Houston	3:37

Know You Will — Apple Music exclusive
No.	Title	Length
1.	"Know You Will"	3:37
2.	"Know You Will" (lyric video)	3:34
Total length:		7:11

== Personnel ==
Credits adapted from AllMusic.

- Adam Cattell — engineer
- Michael Guy Chislett — acoustic guitar, engineer, electric guitar, producer, recording
- Matt Crocker — background vocals
- Jonathan Douglass — background vocals
- Andrea García — A&R
- Taya Gaukrodger — background vocals
- Sam Gibson — mixing engineer
- Jad Gillies — background vocals
- Bruno Gruel — mastering engineer
- Benjamin Hastings — vocals
- Hillsong United — primary artist
- Joel Houston — executive producer, piano, producer
- Tahisha Hunt — background vocals
- Grant Konemann — engineer
- Daniel McMurray — drums, engineer, recording
- Johnny Rays — management
- Brendan Tan — percussion
- Ben Tennikoff — engineer, piano, programmer, recording
- Matt Tennikoff — bass
- Dylan Thomas — acoustic guitar, electric guitar, piano
- Ben Whincop — bass
- Michael Zuvela — engineer, recording

== Charts ==
=== Weekly charts ===
Weekly chart performance for "Know You Will"
Chart (2021)	Peak position
New Zealand Hot Singles (Recorded Music NZ)	34
US Hot Christian Songs (Billboard)	23
US Christian Airplay (Billboard)	22
US Christian AC (Billboard)	24

=== Year-end charts ===
Year-end chart performance for "Know You Will"
Chart (2021)	Position
US Christian Songs (Billboard)	82
Chart (2022)	Position
US Christian Songs (Billboard)	74

== Release history ==
Release history and formats for "Know You Will"
Region	Date	Format	Label	Ref.
Various	9 July 2021	Digital download; streaming	Hillsong Music; Capitol Christian Music Group	
United States	10 September 2021	Christian radio	Hillsong Music; Capitol Christian Music Group	
