= Sure Thing (Hillsong United song) =

2021 single by Hillsong United

Single by Hillsong United
- Released: 29 October 2021
- Genre: Contemporary worship music
- Length: 5:48
- Label: Hillsong Music; Capitol CMG
- Songwriters: Benjamin Hastings; Joel Houston
- Producers: Joel Houston; Michael Guy Chislett; Dan McMurray

Hillsong United singles chronology
"Know You Will" (2021)	"Sure Thing" (2021)	"On Repeat" (2022)

Music videos
- "Sure Thing" on YouTube
- "Sure Thing" (Live) on YouTube
- "Sure Thing" (Lyrics) on YouTube

"Sure Thing" is a song performed by Australian contemporary worship band Hillsong United. It was released on 29 October 2021, as the second single from their sixth studio album, Are We There Yet? (2022). The song was written by Benjamin Hastings, and Joel Houston. Joel Houston, Michael Guy Chislett, and Dan McMurray handled the production of the single.

"Sure Thing" peaked at No. 46 on the US Hot Christian Songs chart. "For God Is with Us" received a GMA Dove Award nomination for Short Form Video of the Year (Concept) at the 2022 GMA Dove Awards.

== Background ==
Hillsong United released "Sure Thing" as a single on 29 October 2021, following the release of "Know You Will" in July. Jonathon Douglass of Hillsong United shared the story behind the song, saying:

"Sure Thing" is about making the decision to not do this journey of life on our own—so that we don't get caught up in the sinking sand in life that can leave us confused, disoriented and full of fear. Instead, we can build our lives on the solid rock that is Jesus and His word. On that rock, we can look to the future with the knowledge that He is working all things together for good. Our prayer is that this song will give you confidence and faith in Jesus, for He is our sure thing.

== Composition ==
"Sure Thing" is composed in the key of B with a tempo of 60 beats per minute and a musical time signature of 4/4.

== Accolades ==
Awards
Year	Organization	Award	Result	Ref
2022	GMA Dove Awards	Short Form Video of the Year (Concept)	Nominated	

== Commercial performance ==
"Sure Thing" debuted at number 46 on the US Hot Christian Songs chart dated 13 November 2021.

== Music videos ==
On 9 July 2021, Hillsong United released the official music video of "Sure Thing" together with the lyric video via YouTube. The music video was filmed between Sydney and Los Angeles, with visuals contrasts transitioning from nature to concrete buildings, highlighting "faith as the only constant in a world that is ever-changing." A wanderer is lifted from the ground as the chorus builds up, suggesting that they have been transformed by the music. The music video was produced by Nathaniel Redekop and Danniebelle Whippy and directed by Ricardo Guzman.

The official live performance video of the song was released on 7 December 2021, via YouTube.

== Track listing ==
Sure Thing
No.	Title	Writer(s)	Producers	Length
1.	"Sure Thing"	Benjamin Hastings; Joel Houston	Joel Houston; Michael Guy Chislett; Dan McMurray	5:48

Sure Thing — Apple Music exclusive
No.	Title	Length
1.	"Sure Thing"	5:48
2.	"Sure Thing" (music video)	5:47
Total length:		7:11

== Personnel ==
Credits adapted from AllMusic.

- Adam Cattell — Engineer
- Michael Guy Chislett — electric guitar, engineer, producer
- Matt Crocker — background vocals
- Garrett Davis — A&R
- Jonathan Douglass — background vocals
- Taya Gaukrodger — vocals
- Sam Gibson — mixing engineer
- Brandon Gillies — engineer, recording
- Jad Gillies — background vocals
- Benjamin Hastings — background vocals
- Hillsong United — primary artist
- Joel Houston — executive producer, keyboards, producer, programmer, vocals
- Grant Konemann — engineer, percussion
- Drew Lavyne — mastering engineer
- Dan McMurray — producer
- Daniel McMurray — drums, engineer
- Andrea Garcia Molina — A&R
- Johnny Rays — management
- Ben Tennikoff — bass, engineer, keyboards, programmer
- Matt Tennikoff — bass
- Dylan Thomas — electric guitar
- Michael Zuvela — engineer

== Charts ==
Chart performance for "Sure Thing"
Chart (2021)	Peak position
US Hot Christian Songs (Billboard)	46

== Release history ==
Release history and formats for "Sure Thing"
Region	Date	Format	Label	Ref.
Various	29 October 2021	Digital download; streaming	Hillsong Music; Capitol Christian Music Group	
