= Brighter Days/Tin Roof =

Single by Blessing Offor

from the album Brighter Days, My Tribe
- Language: English
- Released: October 14, 2021
- Length: 6:56
- Label: Capitol CMG
- Songwriters: Blessing Offor; Sam Ellis; Natalie Hemby
- Producers: Sam Ellis; Hank Bentley

Blessing Offor singles chronology
"Hey World (with Lee Brice)" (2020)	"Brighter Days/Tin Roof" (2021)	"Believe" (2022)

"Brighter Days"/"Tin Roof" is a two-track single by American Christian and gospel music artist Blessing Offor. It was released on October 14, 2021, through Capitol Christian Music Group. The songs were included on Offor's 2022 studio album Brighter Days. "Brighter Days" was included on My Tribe, although "Tin Roof" was not. The single is the first release made by Offor since signing to Capitol Christian Music Group.

== "Brighter Days" ==
"Brighter Days" is the first track of the single. It was the first song of Offor's to chart, peaking at No. 25 on the Billboard Adult Contemporary chart, No. 17 on the Pop Airplay chart, and No. 2 on the Hot Christian Songs and Christian Airplay charts. The song was featured on Offor's albums Brighter Days and My Tribe.

== "Tin Roof" ==
"Tin Roof" is the second track of the single. It was previously included on Chris Tomlin's 2020 album, Chris Tomlin & Friends, as a collaboration between Offor and Tomlin. The edition included on the single does not include the collaboration. "Tin Roof" did not enter any charts. Although "Brighter Days" was included on My Tribe, "Tin Roof" was not.

== Track listing ==
No.	Title	Writer(s)	Producer(s)	Length
1.	"Brighter Days"	Blessing Offor; Sam Ellis	Sam Ellis	3:28
2.	"Tin Roof"	Blessing Offor; Natalie Hemby	Hank Bentley	3:28
Total length:				6:56

== Charts ==
=== Weekly charts ===
Chart (2022–23)	Peak position
US Adult Contemporary (Billboard)	24
US Christian Airplay (Billboard)	2
US Christian Songs (Billboard)	2

=== Year-end charts ===
Chart (2022)	Peak position
US Christian Songs (Billboard)	6

== Certifications ==
Region	Certification	Certified units/sales
United States (RIAA)	Gold	500,000^{‡}
^{‡} Sales+streaming figures based on certification alone.
