= Brighter Days (Blessing Offor album) =

Studio album by Blessing Offor
- Released: February 5, 2022
- Genres: Christian contemporary; gospel; pop
- Length: 24:08
- Language: English
- Label: Capitol CMG
- Producers: Hank Bentley; Sam Ellis; Ed Cash

Blessing Offor chronology
Roots (2015)	Brighter Days (2022)	My Tribe (2023)

Alternative cover
- Live Edition album cover

Singles from Brighter Days
- 1. "Tin Roof" Released: October 14, 2021; 2. "Brighter Days" Released: October 14, 2021; 3. "Believe" Released: February 25, 2022

Brighter Days is the major label debut and third studio album by American Christian and gospel music artist Blessing Offor. The seven-track album was released on February 25, 2022, through Capitol Christian Music Group. Three singles were released off the album, "Tin Roof", "Brighter Days", and "Believe". The title track reached No. 2 on the Billboard Hot Christian Songs and Christian Airplay charts, as well as the top 25 on various other mainstream charts. "Believe" reached No. 9 on the Hot Christian Songs and No. 7 on the Christian Airplay charts. The album was released to streaming services and digital download stores.

On May 5, 2022, a live edition of the album was released, featuring live recordings of "Brighter Days", "Believe", "How Much You Mean to Me", and "Tin Roof", as well as a song later included on Offor's 2024 EP Covers, "Make You Feel My Love".

== Reception ==
Professional ratings
Review scores
Source	Rating
Jesus Freak Hideout	4/5 stars
New Release Today	5/5 stars
365 Days of Inspiring Media	5/5 stars

=== Commercial ===
The title track reached No. 2 on Billboard Hot Christian Songs and Christian Airplay, as well as No. 5 on the Billboard Top TV songs, No. 25 on Adult Contemporary, and No. 17 on Pop Airplay charts. "Believe" reached No. 9 on the Hot Christian Songs and No. 7 on the Christian Airplay charts. "Tin Roof" did not chart.

=== Critical ===
The album received generally favorable reviews from critics. Writing for Jesus Freak Hideout, Alex Caldwell gave the album a 4/5 star rating, praising Offor's vocal performance. New Release Today awarded the album a 5/5 star review. In agreement with the five star review, Josh of 365 Days of Inspiring Media wrote, "Simply put, there shouldn't be any reason why not to listen to this".

== Track listing ==
Studio edition
No.	Title	Writer(s)	Producer(s)	Length
1.	"Tin Roof"	Blessing Offor; Natalie Hemby	Hank Bentley	3:28
2.	"Little Bird"	Blessing Offor; Sophie Sanders	Hank Bentley	3:08
3.	"Brighter Days"	Blessing Offor; Sam Ellis	Sam Ellis	3:28
4.	"Believe"	Blessing Offor; Hank Bentley	Hank Bentley	3:13
5.	"How Much You mean to Me"	Blessing Offor; Ed Cash; Chris Tomlin	Ed Cash	3:38
6.	"Love Something"	Blessing Offor; Sophie Sanders	Hank Bentley	3:36
7.	"Brighter Days" (radio version)	Blessing Offor; Sam Ellis	Sam Ellis	3:36
Total length:				24:08

Live edition
No.	Title	Also included on	Length
1.	"Brighter Days" (live)		3:29
2.	"Believe" (live)		2:53
3.	"How Much You Mean to Me" (live)		3:19
4.	"Tin Roof" (live)		2:50
5.	"Make You Feel My Love" (with Bob Lanzetti)	Covers	3:48

== Charts ==
=== Singles ===
Song	Chart (2021)	Peak position
"Brighter Days"	Adult Contemporary (Billboard)	25

Song	Chart (2021)	Peak position
"Brighter Days"	Top TV Songs (Billboard)	5

Song	Chart (2021)	Peak position
"Brighter Days"	Pop Airplay (Billboard)	17

Song	Chart (2021–2023)	Peak position
"Brighter Days"	Hot Christian Songs (Billboard)	2
"Believe"	Hot Christian Songs (Billboard)	9

Song	Chart (2021–2023)	Peak position
"Brighter Days"	Christian Airplay (Billboard)	2
"Believe"	Christian Airplay (Billboard)	7
