= Days Difference =

American pop rock band

- Origin: Virginia Beach, Virginia, United States
- Genre: Pop rock
- Years active: 2002–2013
- Label: Universal Republic(2011-2012)
- Members: Jeremy Smith; Jonathan Smith; Micah Ricks; Jeremiah Ricks

Days Difference was an American pop rock band that formed in Virginia Beach, Virginia, in 2004. The quartet consists of Jeremy Smith (lead vocals/keyboards), Jonathan Smith (drums, percussion), Micah Ricks (bass guitar) and Jeremiah Ricks (lead guitar). The group released their debut album Numbers in 2007. Their self-titled album Days Difference was released on October 6, 2009, and marks the group's first major release on the Universal Motown Records label. In 2011, the band was signed to Universal Republic Records for the release of their next album. The band officially announced in September 2013 that they had been broken up since 2012.

== Band members ==
- Jeremy William Smith - lead vocals, piano. Born in Midland, Texas. on April 1, 1988. He is the younger brother to Jonathan Smith. Jeremy is left handed. He is credited with co-writing the Plain White T's hit single "Boomerang" with Tom Higgenson for their 2011 record "Wonders of the Younger."
- Jonathan "Jon" David Smith - drums, vocals. He was born on May 6, 1986, in Midland, Texas. He is the older brother to Jeremy Smith. Jon is left handed.
- Jeremiah David Ricks - lead guitar, vocals. He was born in Chesapeake, Virginia, on April 30, 1986. Jeremiah is right handed. He is the older brother to Micah Ricks.
- Micah Daniel Ricks - bass guitar. He is the younger brother of lead guitarist, Jeremiah Ricks. He was born on July 10, 1987, in Norfolk, Virginia. Micah is left handed.

== History ==
Jeremy Smith took piano lessons as a child. He is now the frontman and chief songwriting force behind Days Difference, a young quartet from Virginia Beach, Virginia. Jeremy formed Days Difference in May 2004 with his older brother, Jonathan Smith on drums and another set of brothers, Micah and Jeremiah Ricks, who play bass and guitar. The siblings met when Jeremy and Jonathan filled in for a no-show pianist and drummer at a high school concert that Micah and Jeremiah were performing. They played their first official gig in September 2004. By May 2006, they were fully committed to giving Days Difference a shot. They had opened up for several popular bands such as Paramore, Lifehouse, Third Eye Blind, Jack’s Mannequin, Owl City and Yellowcard when they had come through Virginia Beach, Virginia. In 2007, they had released a solo album titled Numbers (see below), and then went on a nationwide tour.

On their first tour, in a matter of 12 days, they got a flat tire on the first day. A few days later and it simply fell off, requiring them to buy a new trailer. Soon after, their drummer acquired a concussion playing soccer and the bass player broke his collarbone playing football. One promoter even got hit by a car, requiring the cancellation of more shows. To top it off, the band received a $300 fine.

Universal Motown saw potential in Days Difference and their ability to connect with a wide audience. The band signed to the label a mere 24 hours after playing a well-attended industry showcase in June 2008. Disney has also climbed aboard, casting Jeremy, Jonathan, and Micah as members of Miley Cyrus's backing band in the big-screen version of Hannah Montana: The Movie.

Continuing the group's success in signing with Universal Motown, Jeremy began collaborating with several veteran co-writers and producers for the band's self-titled album Days Difference. Among these collaborators were Wayne Wilkins (Beyoncé, Natasha Bedingfield), Andrew Frampton (Natasha Bedingfield, Kylie Minogue), Stefanie Ridel Fair (Fergie, Pussycat Dolls), Michael Smidi Smith (Pussycat Dolls, Tupac Shakur), and Tim Myers, former bassist of OneRepublic. Myers and Jeremy co-wrote four key tracks: the first single "Radio Song", the ballad "Imperfections", "Falling Into You" and "Magnetized".

In a recent interview, Jeremy commented on the writing process for the new album: “From the second we worked together, Tim and I saw eye to eye on everything, including the way the melodies and lyrics were supposed to sound it’s almost as if he were my musical twin, but better. As far as co-writing, I just wanted to create the best songs possible. Great songs make great bands, and if you don't have great songs, then there's really no point in releasing an album. We wanted to make an album of hit singles — with great lyrics, great melodies, and great hooks. If you strike that chord with every song, people will connect with you better."

On Thanksgiving 2009 while playing football, Jeremiah Ricks broke his left collar bone. Days Difference was a part of the Pop-Con concert on February 20, 2010, in New York City, New York.

In the summer of 2010, they toured with Jordin Sparks, Ashlyne Huff and Kate Voegele as a part Jordin's first solo tour, The Battlefield Tour.

They also toured with Allstar Weekend that started on July 20 and ended on July 31. Including a show in Boise, Idaho with the Backstreet Boys and Bret Michaels.

In late 2011, they will be performing as Special Guests on Action Item's "The Stronger the Love" tour and later joining Owl City on his nationwide tour.

On September 9, 2013, the band officially announced via their Facebook page that since 2012, they had been broken up. The band wrote

"It's time to confirm what has been true since 2012. After 8 brilliant years as a band Days Difference has come to an end.

When the band moved from Virginia Beach in 2012 we split between Los Angeles and Texas. Over the course of the year we realized the distance made moving forward as a band impossible, and it was time for us to pursue different interests inside and outside of music. To our fans: thank you for your love and support over the years. We shared so many incredible experiences with you and made unforgettable memories together. You changed our lives. We'll always remember and cherish you. Thank you so much.

We will continue to update you on any musical endeavors we pursue. We hope 2013 is the best year of your lives. Stay crazy!

Love, Days Difference"

Singer Jeremy later tweeted "Thanks for the memories, love, and support @daysdifference fans. You all are the very best. Here's to a new chapter and new adventures."

It was also announced earlier in the year that Jeremy would soon be heading back into the studio to record new music.

== Discography ==
=== Albums ===
Year	Title	Label
2007	Numbers	Black Dog Recordings
2009	Days Difference	Universal Motown

=== Singles ===
Year	Title	Label
2008	"1938 (Life Is Still Worth Living)"	Self-released
2009	"Radio Song"	Universal Motown
2009	"Falling Into You"	Universal Motown
2009	"Are You Happy?"	Universal Motown
2010	"Speakers"	Universal Motown
2011	"Down with Me"	Universal Republic

=== Music videos ===
List of music videos, showing year released and director
Title	Year	Director(s)
"Speakers"	2010	
"Down with Me"	2011	Shomi Patwary / illusivemedia
