= Niagara County Tribune/Sentinel =

- Type: Weekly Newspaper
- Owner: Niagara Frontier Publications
- Founder: Skip Mazenauer
- Editor-in-chief: Terrence P. Dufy
- Managing editor: Joshua Maloni
- Founded: 1944 (as Island Dispatch)
- Headquarters: 2859 Whitehaven Road, Grand Island, New York, United States
- Circulation: 10,300
- OCLC number: 30453701
- Website: wnypapers.com

The Niagara County Tribune/Sentinel is an American weekly newspaper serving Niagara County, New York. It was formed in 2020 through the merger of the Niagara-Wheatfield Tribune and the Lewiston-Porter Sentinel. It was founded by Skip Mazenauer and is published by Niagara Frontier Publications. It is considered a paper of record for Niagara County by the Niagara County Clerk's office.

== History ==
In 1944, Ollie Howard founded the biweekly Island Dispatch. A few years later Art and Dorothy Mazenauer started the Grand Island PennySaver in 1950. At some point the couple sold the paper to their son Skip Mazenauer who went on to buy the Island Dispatch in 1978. At that time the company Niagara Frontier Publications began. Mazenauer created the Niagara-Wheatfield Tribune in 1985.

Two years later the Lewiston Business Association accepted proposals from local newspaper companies to create a weekly community newspaper for Lewiston, New York. Niagara Frontier Publications won the bid. The newspaper's first issue was published on February 14, 1987, the masthead reading "WE NEED A NAME!" and was originally published monthly. The name Lewiston-Porter Sentinel was chosen from among suggestions made by readers, and appeared in the masthead for the first time with the second issue on March 14, 1987. The newspaper changed from monthly to weekly frequency on October 3, 1992.

In 2009, the longtime bookkeeper for Niagara Frontier Publications, Jack C. Bates, was found guilty of embezzling $75,000 from the company.

In April 2020, the Niagara-Wheatfield Tribune and the Lewiston-Porter Sentinel merged due to the COVID-19 recession in the United States to form the Niagara County Tribune/Sentinel. In October 2024, the Island Dispatch was absorbed into the paper.

On December 24, 2024, the founder and owner of Niagara Frontier Publications, Skip Mazenauer, died at the age of 80.

== Awards and honors ==
Publishers Skip and Judy Mazenauer received the 2014 Family Business Center Vision Award for their leadership in founding four newspapers for Western New York State. The press release for the award noted the important contributions of the paper to the community.

In 2017, Niagara Wheatfield Tribune editor David Yarger won 3rd place in the New York Press Association's Better Newspaper Contest, in the category of Rookie Reporter of the Year.

In June 2017, the staff of the Lewiston-Porter Sentinel were honored by New York State Senator Robert G. Ortt with a certificate of recognition "for 30 years of business and service to the River Region." The newspaper was also the subject of a 2017 proclamation by Assembly member Anthony J. Morinello. In March 2017, Niagara County Legislator Clyde L. Burmaster recognized the publishers, editor-in-chief, and editor of the Lewiston-Porter Sentinel "for the positive impact it has had in the community for the past 30 years." Niagara Frontier Publications has received numerous other community and small business awards throughout its history.
