= Benjamin William Hastings =

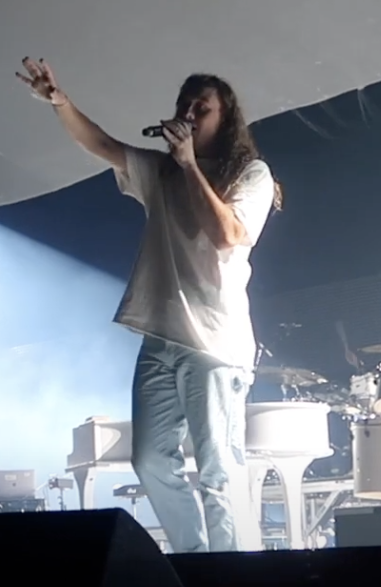
- Hastings in 2019

Background information
- Also known as: Benjamin Hastings
- Born: Benjamin William Hastings; 15 November 1991 (age 34); Belfast, Northern Ireland
- Genres: Christian contemporary; worship
- Occupations: Singer; songwriter; record producer
- Instruments: Vocals; guitar; keyboards
- Years active: 2017–present
- Label: Capitol CMG
- Member of: Hillsong Worship
- Formerly of: Hillsong United
- Spouse: Jessa Hastings
- Website: benjaminwilliamhastings.com

Benjamin William Hastings (born 15 November 1991) is a Northern Irish Christian music artist, known for being a member of Australian worship bands Hillsong Worship and Hillsong United. He now resides in Nashville. He is the writer of many famous songs, most notably the RIAA platinum-certified Christian contemporary song "100 Billion X (So Will I)" During his solo career, he has released three studio albums, two extended plays, and twelve singles.

== Discography ==
=== Studio albums ===
Title	Details	Peak chart positions
Title	Details	US Christ
Benjamin William Hastings	Released: November 4, 2022; Label: Capitol CMG; Formats: Digital download, streaming	—
Sold Out, Sincerely	Released: October 4, 2024; Label: Capitol CMG; Formats: Digital download, streaming, CD, LP	27
How I'd Sing It On a Sunday	Released: April 11, 2025; Label: Capitol CMG; Formats: digital download, streaming	—
Happy to Be Here (with Aodhan King)	Releasing: May 29, 2026; Label: Capitol CMG/Anotherland; Formats: Digital download, streaming	—
"—" denotes a recording that did not chart or was not released in that territory.

=== Live albums ===
Title	Details
Just Waiting to See What God Does (with Aodhan King)	Releasing: August 28, 2026; Label: Independent; Formats: Digital download, streaming

=== Extended plays ===
Title	Details
From Seed to Sequoia	Released: November 30, 2021; Label: Capitol CMG; Formats: Digital download, streaming; Track listing: 1. "White Christmas"; 2. "Seasons"; 3. "Auld Lang Syne"
If It Wasn't for Jesus	Released: September 6, 2024; Label: Capitol CMG; Formats: Digital download, streaming
"—" denotes a recording that did not chart or was not released in that territory.

=== Singles ===
Title	Year	Peak Chart Positions				Certifications	Album
Title	Year	US Christ	US Christ Air	US Christ AC	US Christ Digital	Certifications	Album
"Seasons" (with Hillsong Worship)	2017	30	41	—	—		The Peace Project
"So Will I (100 Billion X)" (with Hillsong UNITED)	2018	3	6	6	2	RIAA: Platinum	Wonder
"Know You Will" (with Hillsong UNITED)	2018	23	21	24	16		Are We There Yet?
"Homeward + Faith Is"	2021	—	—	—	—		Benjamin William Hastings
"The Jesus I Know"	2022	—	—	—	—		Benjamin William Hastings
"Anyway"	2022	—	—	—	—		Benjamin William Hastings
"That's The Power" (with Hillsong UNITED)	2022	—	—	—	—		These Same Skies
"A Fathers Blessing"	2022	—	—	—	—		Benjamin William Hastings
"Feels Like a Blessing" (with JUDAH.)	2022	—	43	—	—		Benjamin William Hastings
"Eden (Isn't It Just Like You?)	2022	—	—	—	—		Benjamin William Hastings
"So Help Me God"	2022	—	—	—	—		Benjamin William Hastings
"That's the Thing About Praise" (with Blessing Offor)	2023	21	14	—	—		Benjamin William Hastings
"HIStory" (with JUDAH)	2023	—	—	—	—		Non-album single
"Agenda - Live at Sound Emporium"	2023	—	—	—	—		Songs You Maybe Didn't Know I Wrote and Some Maybe You Did (Live at Sound Emporium)
"Take You At Your Word" (with Cody Carnes)	2024	11	1	6	—		God is Good!
"Abandoned - Original"	2024	26	30	—	—		If it wasn't for Jesus
"What a friend" (with Aodhan King)	2024	—	—	—	—		Sold out, sincerely
"Set me on fire"	2024	—	—	—	—		Sold out, sincerely
"Entregado (Abandoned)" (with Kim Richards)	2024	—	—	—	—		Non-album single
"If it wasn't for Jesus (from the studio)"	2025	—	—	—	—		How I'd Sing It on a Sunday
"Lord, I Give You My Heart (from the studio)" (with Reuben Morgan and CXMMXNS)	2025	—	—	—	—		How I'd Sing It on a Sunday
"That's Who I Praise (from the studio)" (Brandon Lake cover)	2025	—	—	—	—		How I'd Sing It on a Sunday
"At the Heart of It"	2025	—	—	—	—		Non-album single
"I'll Fly Away" (with Josiah Queen)	2025	25	—	—	—		Mt. Zion
"The Man I Could Be"	2025	—	—	—	—		Non-album singles
"Year to the Day" (original or with Josh Baldwin)	2025	—	—	—	—		Non-album singles
"Evidence" (with Josh Baldwin)	2025	—	—	—	—		Non-album singles
"—" denotes a recording that did not chart or was not released in that territory.

=== Other charted songs ===
Title	Year	Peak Chart Positions		Album
Title	Year	US Christ	NZ Hot	Album
"Highlands (Song of Ascent)" (with Hillsong UNITED)	2019	23	—	People
"Echoes (Till We See the Other Side)" (with Hillsong UNITED)	2019	36	—	People
"Come Alive" (with Hillsong Worship)	2019	34	35	Alive
"If it Wasn't for Jesus"	2024	26	—	Sold Out, Sincerely
"Yahweh" (with Aodhan King featuring Tiffany Hudson)	2026	45	—	Happy to Be Here
"—" denotes a recording that did not chart or was not released in that territory.
