= Miracle Nights Tour =

2022–23 concert tour by Brandon Lake

- Tour by Brandon Lake
- Promotional poster for the tour
- Location: United States
- Associated album: Help!
- Start date: October 7, 2022
- End date: April 23, 2023
- Legs: 2
- No. of shows: 26
- Guests: Blessing Offor; Joshua Silverberg; Chandler Moore; Benjamin William Hastings

Brandon Lake concert chronology
- Singalong Tour (2021); Miracle Nights Tour (2022–23); Summer Worship Nights Tour (2023–24)

Miracle Nights Tour was the first headlining tour by Brandon Lake. The tour started on October 7, 2022, at Bayside Church in Granite Bay, California and concluded on April 23, 2023, at NorthRidge Church in Plymouth, Michigan, comprising 26 dates across several cities in the United States.

== Background ==
On April 11, 2022, Brandon Lake announced his first headlining tour, dubbed the Miracle Nights Tour, joined by Blessing Offor and Joshua Silverberg as special guests and set to visit twelve cities in the United States during the fall of 2022. The tour commenced at October 7, 2022 at Bayside Church in Granite Bay, California and concluded on November 20, 2022, at Seacoast Church in Mount Pleasant, South Carolina. The tour was intended to showcase Lake's most popular songs, including "Graves Into Gardens," "Too Good to Not Believe," and "Gratitude," as well as songs from his third studio album, Help! (2022). On October 10, 2022, Brandon Lake announced that he partnered with partnered with Reboot Recovery, a faith-based trauma healing program, to provide immediate assistance concertgoers dealing with mental health struggles.

On November 14, 2022, Lake announced the spring 2023 leg of the Miracle Nights Tour, with Benjamin William Hastings joining him as a special guest. The spring will begin on March 17, 2023, at Central Church in Henderson, Nevada, and conclude on April 23, 2023, at NorthRidge Church in Plymouth, Michigan.

== Commercial performance ==
On November 3, 2022, it was announced that the fall leg of the Miracle Nights Tour was completely sold out. Tickets for most dates selling out months and weeks prior to the show, and the ticket pricing for an artist's first headline tour was higher than the industry average. Tour presenters Transparent Productions indicated that the spring leg of the tour will be launched in November, following the success of the fall leg.

== Set list ==
This set list is representative of the October 8, 2022 show at Rock Church in San Diego, California.

1. "Help!"
2. "We Praise You"
3. "Honey in the Rock"
4. "Rest on Us"
5. "Greater Still"
6. "Same God"
7. "Too Good to Not Believe"
8. "House of Miracles"
9. "Rattle!"
10. "Talking to Jesus"
11. "Fear Is Not My Future"
12. "Champion"
13. "Gratitude"
14. "Graves Into Gardens"

== Tour dates ==
List of concerts, showing date, city, state, venue, and opening acts
Date	City	State	Venue	Opening Act(s)
Fall 2022 — Leg 1
October 7, 2022	Granite Bay Roseville	California	Bayside Church	Blessing Offor; Joshua Silverberg
October 8, 2022	San Diego	California	Rock Church	Blessing Offor; Joshua Silverberg
October 9, 2022	Cypress	California	Seacoast Grace Church	Blessing Offor; Joshua Silverberg
October 14, 2022	Webster	Texas	Gateway Community Church	Blessing Offor; Joshua Silverberg
October 15, 2022	San Antonio	Texas	Oak Hills Church - Crownridge Campus	Blessing Offor; Joshua Silverberg
October 16, 2022	Arlington	Texas	College Park Center	Blessing Offor; Joshua Silverberg; Chandler Moore
November 4, 2022	Anderson	Indiana	Reardon Auditorium	Blessing Offor; Joshua Silverberg
November 5, 2022	Grove City	Ohio	The Naz Church	Blessing Offor; Joshua Silverberg
November 6, 2022	Naperville	Illinois	Calvary Church	Blessing Offor; Joshua Silverberg
November 18, 2022	Brandon	Florida	Bell Shoals Church	Blessing Offor; Joshua Silverberg
November 19, 2022	Jacksonville	Florida	Christ's Church	Blessing Offor; Joshua Silverberg
November 20, 2022	Mount Pleasant	South Carolina	Seacoast Church	Blessing Offor; Joshua Silverberg
November 22, 2022	Mount Pleasant	South Carolina	Seacoast Church	Blessing Offor; Joshua Silverberg
Spring 2023 — Leg 2
March 17, 2023	Henderson	Nevada	Central Church	Benjamin William Hastings
March 18, 2023	Phoenix	Arizona	Dream City Church	Benjamin William Hastings
March 19, 2023	Inglewood	California	YouTube Theater	Benjamin William Hastings
March 24, 2023	Highlands Ranch	Colorado	Cherry Hills Community Church	Benjamin William Hastings
March 25, 2023	Kansas City	Missouri	Sheffield Family Life Center	Benjamin William Hastings
March 26, 2023	Chesterfield	Missouri	The Factory	Benjamin William Hastings
April 14, 2023	Atlanta	Georgia	Mount Paran Church	—
April 15, 2023	Charlotte	North Carolina	Ovens Auditorium	—
April 16, 2023	Nashville	Tennessee	Ryman Auditorium	Benjamin William Hastings
April 20, 2023	Leesburg	Virginia	Cornerstone Chapel	Benjamin William Hastings
April 21, 2023	Leesburg	Virginia	Cornerstone Chapel	Benjamin William Hastings
April 22, 2023	Burlington	New Jersey	Fountain of Life Center	Benjamin William Hastings
April 23, 2023	Plymouth	Michigan	NorthRidge Church	Benjamin William Hastings
