= Help! (Brandon Lake album) =

2022 studio album by Brandon Lake

Studio album by Brandon Lake
- Released: May 13, 2022
- Recorded: 2021
- Genre: Contemporary worship music
- Length: 43:07
- Label: Tribl
- Producer: Judah Akers; Justin Amundrud; Jacob Sooter; Jeff Pardo; Michael Fatkin; David Leonard; Micah Nichols; Joshua Silverberg

Brandon Lake chronology
Almond Eyes (2021)	Help! (2022)	Song Sessions (2022)

Singles from Help!
- 1. "Help!" Released: April 29, 2022

Help! is the third studio album by American contemporary worship musician Brandon Lake, released via Tribl Records on May 13, 2022. The album features guest appearances by Judah, Amanda Cook, and Chandler Moore.

Help! is a concept album which focuses on mental health, thematically exploring issues such as depression, anxiety, and loneliness among others from a faith-based perspective.

The album was supported by the release of the title track as the lead single. To promote the album, Brandon Lake embarked on the Miracle Nights Tour, which spans several cities across the United States.

The album was a commercial success upon its release, debuting at number 18 on Billboard's Top Christian Albums chart in the United States.

== Background ==
On April 29, 2022, Brandon Lake announced that he would be releasing a full-length album titled Help! on May 13, 2022. Lake shared in an interview with K-Love that the album was initially intended to be a hold-people-over extended play of three songs, but it then became a nine-song record, while confirming that "a "proper" long-form follow-up collection is in the works." Lake also shared that his own mental health issues began to come up when he started touring, then went to his counsellor and began writing songs about how he felt and "what God says about it." Lake also revealed the album's title track was the initial catalyst for making the album, after experiencing a panic attack shortly prior into entering a songwriting session with Jacob Sooter, with whom he shared his story and co-wrote the song with.

== Music and lyrics ==
The album has been described as a collection of songs depicting "Lake's heart cry in the battle against depression, anxiety, loneliness, and other mental health struggles--acting as a declarative prayer amidst the processing of his personal emotions." Jasmine Peterson described the sound of the album as containing "flavors" of pop/electronic ("Meant for Good"), R&B/soul ("Hard Year"), acoustic ballads ("Don't You Give Up on Me"), and alternative rock vibes that are comparable to mainstream bands like Imagine Dragons and OneRepublic ("Help!," "Always Holding On," "Save Me").

The album begins with "Meant For Good" which is "a lyrically simplistic rock melody whereby both vocalists relay to us all that God turns around even the most dire of situations- what the devil intended for bad, God intended for good." The album's title track sonically "feels like a panic attack with an onslaught of chaotic sounds and poetic lyrics." "Pharaoh (Let My People Go)" is a track that "dives deep into the faithfulness of Jesus, and praises God for His steadfastness and His providence throughout every season of our lives" It is followed by "Don't You Give Up On Me" which is an acoustic guitar ballad sung from God's perspective, reminding us that "God is answering our prayers, our cries, our hopes, and our dreams, all the time." "Always Holding On" is a rock song which "relaying to us all that Jesus is always holding onto us." "Hard Year" is a song that acknowledges "the toll COVID has taken on our collective mental health." "So Close" is a piano ballad featuring Amanda Cook where they declare "that even if Jesus is this close to us, the song reminds us that we need Jesus to be closer to us every day, so that we can evidently see and experience his lavish and unending love and devotion to us all." "Fear Is Not My Future" is a track that features Chandler Moore and serves as "a faith-filled declaration of God's power in our lives, which is greater than our past or current circumstances." In "Save Me," Lake admits his own mental health issues, pleading with God and "asking Him to help and to save us all from our own demons and our own vices." The album ends with "Thank You," where Lake is joined by his children "and Jesus is given the glory and honour and praise in a simple yet effective prayer of gratitude and of thanks."

== Release and promotion ==
"Help!" was released on April 29, 2022, as the lead single from the album. Lake dedicated the album's title track to Mental Health Awareness Month which is observed in May in the United States.

== Tour ==
On April 11, 2022, Brandon Lake announced his first headlining tour, dubbed the Miracle Nights Tour, joined by Blessing Offor and Joshua Silverberg as special guests and set to visit twelve cities in the United States during the fall of 2022. The tour commenced at October 7, 2022 at Bayside Church in Granite Bay, California and concluded on November 20, 2022, at Seacoast Church in Mount Pleasant, South Carolina. The tour was intended to showcase Lake's most popular songs, including "Graves Into Gardens," "Too Good to Not Believe," and "Gratitude," as well as songs from his third studio album, Help! (2022). On October 10, 2022, Brandon Lake announced that he partnered with partnered with Reboot Recovery, a faith-based trauma healing program, to provide immediate assistance concertgoers dealing with mental health struggles.

On November 14, 2022, Lake announced the spring 2023 leg of the Miracle Nights Tour, with Benjamin William Hastings joining him as a special guest. The spring will begin on March 17, 2023, at Central Church in Henderson, Nevada, and conclude on April 23, 2023, at NorthRidge Church in Plymouth, Michigan.

== Critical reception ==
Professional ratings
Review scores
Source	Rating
365 Days of Inspiring Media	4.5/5

In a NewReleaseToday review, Jasmine Patterson commended Lake's experimentation with a variety of musical styles and genres, arriving at the conclusion that "Help! is a daring, captivating record with a much-needed message of honesty and hope. It appeals to fans of Rock and Worship and everything in between. And God will use these songs to bring healing to your heart." Joshua Andre in his 365 Days of Inspiring Media review opined that "With the track list being around about 40-odd minutes; a few of the songs drag, but overall the album is quite compelling- in no way was I bored or disinterested. My attention was held all the way, and as we wait and as some of us are in isolation because of COVID-19; let us reflect upon the year and upon the future, and let us listen to Brandon Lake's Help! while we do ponder life's big questions."

== Commercial performance ==
In the United States, Help! debuted at number 18 on the Billboard Top Christian Albums chart dated May 28, 2022.

== Track listing ==
Help! track listing
No.	Title	Writer(s)	Producer(s)	Length
1.	"Meant for Good" (with Judah.)	Brandon Lake; Judah Akers	Judah Akers; Justin Amundrud	3:34
2.	"Help!"	Lake; Jacob Sooter	Jacob Sooter	3:03
3.	"Pharaoh (Let My People Go)"	Lake; Cody Carnes; Ethan Hulse	Jacob Sooter; Jeff Pardo	3:26
4.	"Don't You Give Up on Me"	Lake; Michael Fatkin; Benjamin Hastings	Michael Fatkin	4:35
5.	"Always Holding On"	Lake; David Leonard; Sam McCabe	David Leonard	3:58
6.	"Hard Year"	Lake; Micah Nichols; Andrew Cherry	Micah Nichols	3:42
7.	"So Close" (with Amanda Cook)	Lake; Amanda Cook; Sooter; Maryanne J. George; Rita Springer	Jacob Sooter	5:55
8.	"Fear Is Not My Future" (with Chandler Moore)	Lake; Hannah Shackleford; Jonathan Jay; Nicole Hannel	Jacob Sooter	7:02
9.	"Save Me"	Lake; Joshua Silverberg	Joshua Silverberg	4:08
10.	"Thank You"	Lake	Jacob Sooter	3:40
Total length:				43:07

== Charts ==
Chart performance for Help!
Chart (2022)	Peak position
US Christian Albums (Billboard)	18

== Release history ==
Release history for Help!
Region	Date	Format	Label	Ref.
Various	May 13, 2022	Digital download; streaming	Tribl Records	
