= House on a Hill =

Studio album by Amanda Lindsey Cook
- Released: March 29, 2019
- Recorded: 2018
- Studio: A secluded house in Nashville, Tennessee
- Genre: Contemporary worship music
- Length: 52:42
- Label: Bethel Music
- Producer: Amanda Lindsey Cook; Jason Ingram; Paul Mabury

Amanda Lindsey Cook chronology
| Brave New World (2015) | House on a Hill (2019) | State of the Union (2022) |

House on a Hill is the fifth studio album from Canadian singer and songwriter Amanda Lindsey Cook. It was released on March 29, 2019, via Bethel Music. Cook collaborated with Jason Ingram and Paul Mabury in the production of the album.

The album was preceded by the release of promotional single "Awakening". To further promote the album, Cook embarked on the House on a Hill Album Release Shows tour before the album's release. She also toured with Hillsong United as an opening act on the People Tour 2019. Cook was scheduled to embark on the House on a Hill Tour, set to be her first headlining tour, which was later cancelled.

The album garnered critical acclaim and commercial success, having charted on the US Christian Albums chart at No. 6 and the UK Christian & Gospel Albums at No. 4.

== Background ==
"House on a Hill, it was a picture painted quite literally in my life because friends of mine had a little house on a hill that was standing empty for a few months, except for the studio that was in it, which we recorded the record in that studio. They invited me. It felt really providential, I remember him (my friend) saying that. He's like, "I just feel like this house is set aside if you want it for a couple of months to just catch your breath, recalibrate and center yourself." And so I took them up on it."

– Amanda Lindsey Cook, on the naming of the album.

Amanda Lindsey Cook had announced her return to social media near the end of February 2019, indicating that she will release new music in the year.

Cook recorded House on a Hill over a two-month long retreat at a secluded house in the wooded hills of Nashville, Tennessee, working with producers Jason Ingram and Paul Mabury, and singer-songwriter Steffany Gretzinger in writing the album. Cook also disconnected from social media and spent time with close friends in the process of creating the album. Cook first visited the house in January 2018.

== Release and promotion ==
On March 9, 2019, Cook released "Awakening" as the first promotional single from the album with its accompanying music video, with the album concurrently being availed for pre-order.

== Touring ==
On March 9, 2019, Cook announced that she will be going on the House on a Hill Album Release Shows tour, with four shows in the lead-up to the album's release, commencing at the Gramercy Theatre in New York City on March 25, 2019, and concluding in Nashville, Tennessee on March 28, 2019. Cook would also join Hillsong United on the People Tour as an opening act to perform at twenty-nine venues in 29 U.S. cities, including the Staples Center in Los Angeles and Madison Square Garden in New York City.

Following Cook's successful tour run with Hillsong United, Premier Productions announced that Amanda Lindsey Cook will be embarking on her first headlining tour, dubbed the House on a Hill Tour, with Apollo LTD as the opening act, with sponsorship from Food for the Hungry. The 21-city tour was set to commence at Destiny Church in St. Louis, Missouri on September 19, 2019, and conclude at WorkPlay in Birmingham, Alabama on October 28, 2019. The tour was later cancelled.

== Critical reception ==
Professional ratings
Review scores
| Source | Rating |
|---|---|
| CCM Magazine | 4.5/5 stars |
| The Christian Beat | 4.9/5 |
| Cross Rhythms | 9/10 squares |
| Hallels | 3/5 |
| Jesus Freak Hideout | 4/5 stars |
| Today's Christian Entertainment | 4.4/5 stars |

CCM Magazine's Jen Rose Yokel gave a favourable review of the album, describing it as "a beautiful work of worship born in the silence and a celebration of God's unfailing, ever-present love." Yokel opined that "Cook has crafted a record that feels like stepping into the sun after a long winter night, the perfect meditative soundtrack for the first days of spring." Writing for The Christian Beat, Jessie Clarks praised the album, calling it "a true piece of art born from a place of rawness, fragility, and honesty. The collection of tracks that make up this album shows a level of intentionality that can only be God-inspired, and will immediately transform the listener's heart into a posture of worship." Timothy Holden of Cross Rhythms stated in a positive review that the album "is not the full bore Bethel Music worship experience, but a much more ambient pop exploration of grace, forgiveness, growth and the worship which results from these things." Holden noted that the album "requires repeated plays for all of its artistry to come to light, but will reward all those prepared to take the journey with Amanda." Jesus Freak Hideout's Josh Balogh says in his four star review: "This is an album for truly quiet times, and this listener found that the best experience with the album was as worshipful background music, or in a set of headphones to catch the quiet subtleties." NewReleaseToday's Kevin Davis praised the album saying, "This is an excellent set of songs that focus on the central themes of asking God to inhabit our inner being and truly allowing the power of the Holy Spirit to sanctify us along with relying solely on the love of Jesus to truly mold our hearts and make us more like Him." Kelly Meade, indicating in a three-point-eight star review at Today's Christian Entertainment, says "Throughout House on a Hill we hear a theme of rest and reflection after becoming burned out as a result of trying to maintain an exhausting pace that the busyness of life brings."

Timothy Yap of Hallels bemoaned the sameness of the album's tracks, "All the songs here start off in whispery intonations before soaring a fraction in the chorus before disrupting again in softer shades. And even certain chord patterns are so repetitive that there's a glaring predictability."

=== Accolades ===
Year-end lists
| Publication | Accolade | Rank | Ref. |
|---|---|---|---|
| NewReleaseToday | Top 10 Worship Albums of 2019 | 9 | |

== Commercial performance ==
In the United States, House on a Hill launched at No. 6 and No. 52 on the Billboard Christian Albums and Top Album Sales chart dated April 13, 2019. In the United Kingdom, the album launched at No. 4 on the Official Christian & Gospel Albums Chart dated April 9, 2020, published by the Official Charts Company.

== Track listing ==
House on a Hill
| No. | Title | Writer(s) | Length |
|---|---|---|---|
| 1. | "Awakening" | Jason Ingram; Amanda Lindsey Cook; Steffany Gretzinger | 6:25 |
| 2. | "Evergreen" | Ingram; Paul Mabury; Cook | 4:38 |
| 3. | "I Am - Because You Are" | Ingram; Cook | 5:50 |
| 4. | "Not Going Anywhere" | Ingram; Mabury; Cook | 5:01 |
| 5. | "House on a Hill" | Ingram; Cook; Gretzinger | 6:04 |
| 6. | "Comforter" | Ingram; Mabury; Cook; Gretzinger | 6:02 |
| 7. | "Love Never Fails" | Ingram; Mabury; Cook; Gretzinger | 4:56 |
| 8. | "The Clearing" | Ingram; Mabury; Cook; Gretzinger | 5:17 |
| 9. | "Water Under the Bridge" | Jeremy Riddle; Gretzinger; Cook | 3:38 |
| 10. | "The New Country" | Ingram; Cook | 4:51 |
| Total length: | | | 52:42 |

- Songwriting credits adapted from PraiseCharts.

== Personnel ==
Adapted from AllMusic.

- Eric Allen – artist direction, director
- Robby Busick – production manager
- Morgan Campbell – art direction, design, illustrations
- Amanda Lindsey Cook – background vocals, piano, primary artist, producer, programming
- Joe Creppell – mastering
- Suzanne Ecker – creative director
- Chris Estes – director
- Chris Greely – mixing
- Jenny Hislop – production manager
- Jason Ingram – producer, programming
- Brian Johnson – executive producer
- Taylor Johnson – guitar
- Dwayne Larring – guitar
- Paul Mabury – background vocals, drums, producer, programming
- Sean Moffitt – mixing
- Justina Stevens – art direction, design, illustrations
- Joel Taylor – executive producer
- Joe Williams – bass, programming

== Charts ==
| Chart (2019) | Peak position |
|---|---|
| UK Christian & Gospel Albums (OCC) | 4 |
| US Christian Albums (Billboard) | 6 |
| US Independent Albums (Billboard) | 11 |
| US Top Album Sales (Billboard) | 52 |

== Release history ==
| Region | Date | Format | Label | Ref. |
|---|---|---|---|---|
| Various | March 29, 2019 | CD; Digital download; streaming | Bethel Music | |
