= Today Is the Day (disambiguation) =

Today Is the Day are a noise rock band from Nashville, Tennessee.

Today Is the Day may also refer to:

- Today Is the Day (film), a 1933 German comedy film directed by Kurt Gerron
- Today Is the Day (Today Is the Day album), 1996
- Today Is the Day (EP), a 2003 EP by Yo La Tengo
- Today Is the Day (Lincoln Brewster album), 2008
- "Today Is the Day", a song by Dope from Group Therapy
- "Today Is the Day", a song by Lovebites from Electric Pentagram
- "Today Is the Day", a two-part episode of Terminator: The Sarah Connor Chronicles

== See also ==
- The Day Today (1994 TV programme), UK TV show
- Today's the Day (disambiguation)
