= Oxygen (Lincoln Brewster album) =

Studio album by Lincoln Brewster
- Released: August 19, 2014
- Recorded: February–June 2014
- Genre: Contemporary Christian music, Christian rock, contemporary worship music
- Length: 42:38
- Label: Integrity
- Producer: Lincoln Brewster; Colby Wedgeworth

Lincoln Brewster chronology
Joy to the World (2012)	Oxygen (2014)	God of the Impossible (2018)

Oxygen: A Worship Album is the ninth studio album by Lincoln Brewster on Integrity Music.

== Reception ==
Professional ratings
Review scores
Source	Rating
CCM Magazine	4/5 stars
Christian Music Review	3.0/5
Cross Rhythms	9/10 squares
HM Magazine	3.5/5 stars
Jesus Freak Hideout	3.5/5 stars
Louder Than the Music	4/5 stars
New Release Tuesday	4.5/5 stars
Worship Leader	4.5/5 stars

Indicating in a four star review by CCM Magazine, Bert Saraco depicts, "Brewster keeps things musically fresh and gets some extra points for some fiery guitar breaks." Jeremy Armstrong, in a four and a half star review from Worship Leader, recognizing, "Oxygen is certainly his strongest effort in recent history". In agreement with the four and a half star rating is Caitlin Lassiter of New Release Tuesday, describing, "Oxygen seems to be the perfect mix of emotions." Nathan Key, writes a three and a half star review for HM Magazine, realizing, "Oxygen would have been better served by cutting a few songs." Lins Honeyman, allocating a nine out of ten rating upon the album from Cross Rhythms, says, "another quality slice of praise from one of America's most experienced worship artists." Signaling in a three and a half star review for Jesus Freak Hideout, Bert Gangl derides, "Of course, cracks are bound to show in the proverbial pavement of just about any musical project." Jono Davies, rating the album four stars at Louder Than the Music, writes, "This is more than just another solid album from Lincoln, these songs are happy songs that will leave you with a smile on your face, and if you like to dance, go and dance in worship." Rating the album 3.0 out of five for Christian Music Review, Logan Merrick says, "Oxygen is a solid record."

== Track listing ==
No.	Title	Writer(s)	Length
1.	"Live to Praise You"	Lincoln Brewster, Colby Wedgeworth	3:19
2.	"Oxygen"	Brewster, Mia Fieldes	3:29
3.	"Made New"	Josiah James Meeker, Brewster, Wedgeworth	3:23
4.	"There Is Power"	Brewster, Mia Fieldes	3:45
5.	"On Our Side"	Brewster, Corbin Phillips	4:39
6.	"You Never Stop"	Brewster, Mia Fieldes	3:49
7.	"Let It Be Known"	Nick Herbert, Tim Hughes, Tom Smith	3:08
8.	"Sinking Ships (Rescue Has Come)"	Josiah James Meeker, Brewster, Wedgeworth	3:20
9.	"Whole Again (Come Alive)"	Brewster, Mia Fieldes	5:45
10.	"Heartbeat"	Taylor Gall, Corbin Philips, Brewster	4:37
11.	"Shout It Out"	Brewster, Fieldes, Wedgeworth	3:19
Total length:			42:38

== Personnel ==
- Lincoln Brewster – lead vocals, backing vocals, all instruments, programming, guitars
- Colby Wedgeworth – all instruments, programming, backing vocals

=== Production ===
- C. Ryan Dunham – executive producer
- Chico Gonzalez – A&R, artist development
- Lincoln Brewster – producer
- Colby Wedgeworth – producer, recording, mixing
- Scott Sanchez – mastering at Spy Lab Mastering
- Becca Nicholson – production coordination
- Thom Hoyman – art direction, design
- Gilbert Acevedo III – art concepts, elements
- Jeremy Cowart – photography

== Charts ==
Chart (2014)	Peak position
US Billboard 200	51
US Christian Albums (Billboard)	2
