= Lincoln Brewster =

American musician (born 1971)

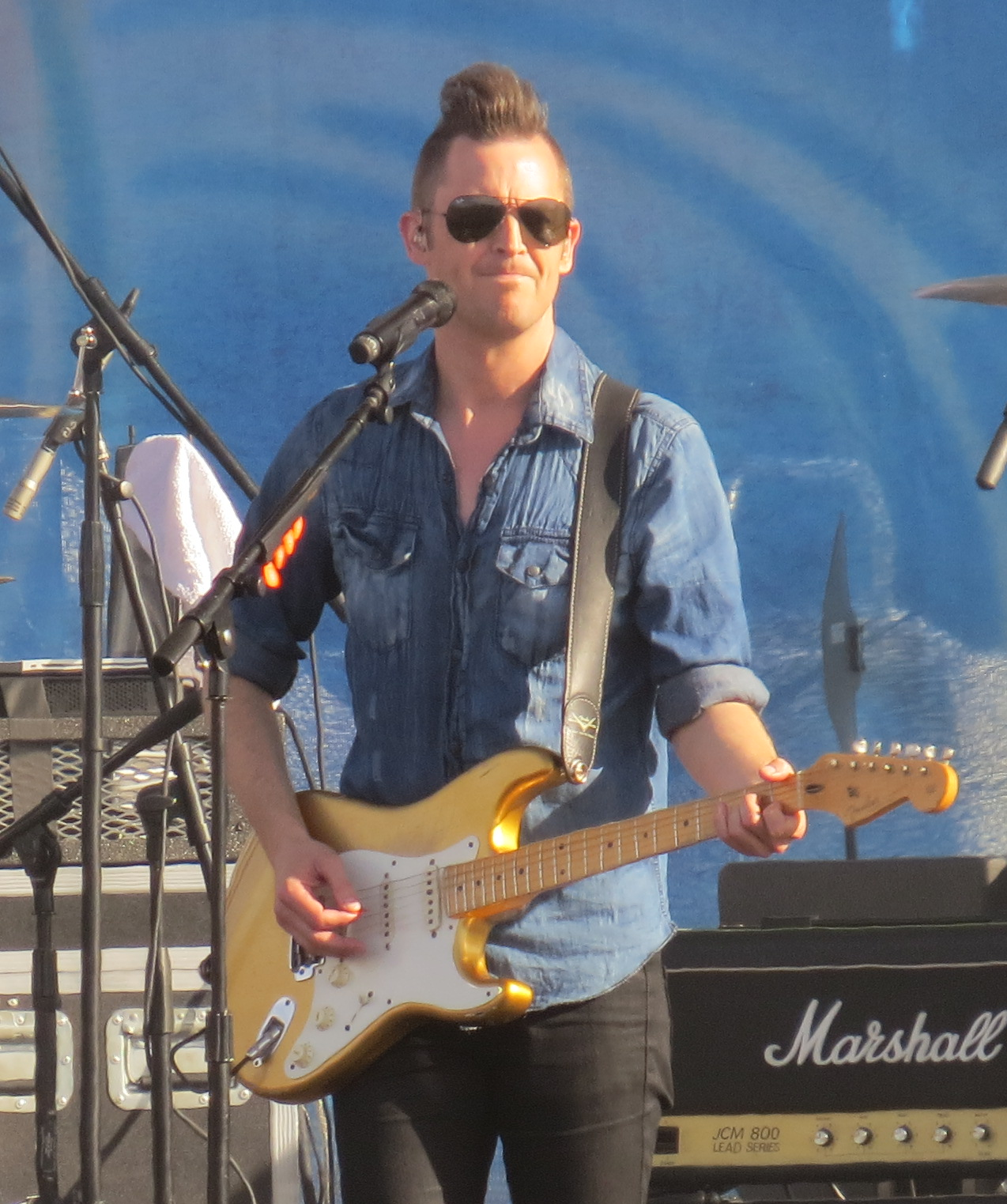
- Lincoln Brewster performing at a Luis Palau event in Anchorage, Alaska, June 2014

Background information
- Born: July 30, 1971 (age 55); Fairbanks, Alaska
- Genres: Worship, CCM
- Occupations: Musician; songwriter; worship leader; pastor
- Instruments: Guitar, vocals
- Years active: 1994–present
- Label: Integrity
- Website: lincolnbrewster.com

Lincoln Brewster (born July 30, 1971) is an American contemporary Christian musician and worship pastor. As a guitarist, singer, and songwriter, Brewster became a sought-after session guitarist in the early 1990s. He is the former senior worship pastor at Bayside Church in Granite Bay, California.

== Biography ==
Since early childhood in Homer, Alaska, Brewster has been a musician. At the age of one, his mother, Cheryl, noticed that he could keep rhythm on a drum set his grandfather had given him. At the age of five, his mother introduced him to the mandolin. Quickly mastering the instrument, he began playing for cruise ship tourists alongside his mother in Homer. Brewster's step brothers include John and Andy Hillstrand from the Discovery TV show Deadliest Catch.

By the time he was 12, Brewster had a band called Lincoln and the Missing Links, which included his mother on bass and vocals. In his late teens, he moved with his family to Modesto, California where he attended Grace M. Davis High School and joined the high school jazz band (playing guitar and drums) and marching band (playing snare drum).

Due to connections he found in Los Angeles, he was offered a record contract when he was 19. Feeling an emptiness in his life, Brewster attended church services with his girlfriend, Laura. He recalls feeling God drawing him close after attending a drama ministry performance with Laura. "I was afraid to lay down a lot of things in my life," he said. "One night, I laid all my cards on the table. I asked the Lord to come into my life, all by myself. It was the best night of sleep I'd ever had. I was very peaceful. I think that was what enabled me to blow off that record deal." He was referring to the offer he was extended.

After receiving a call from Steve Perry inviting him to audition as lead guitarist for his solo project For the Love of Strange Medicine, Brewster accepted; he began songwriting and rehearsals for the album. His guitar technique, tone, and equipment choices possessed similar qualities and texturing to Journey's Neal Schon, and it was touted as a favorable feature in Perry's album. He married Laura and soon afterwards toured with Perry for six months from 1994 to early 1995.

At the end of the tour, Brewster moved back to Modesto to be with his wife where they attended Calvary Temple Church. After working as a sound technician for the church for a while, the senior pastor offered Brewster the position of associate music director and youth worship leader. In 1997, the Brewsters moved to Nashville to serve as youth pastors and eventually as full-time music ministers at The Oasis Church. There, Lincoln Brewster met with executives from Integrity Incorporated who were working on a new Hosanna! Music album. After seeing his guitar-playing ability, one executive listened to a demo project Brewster had produced. Already impressed with the production work and artistry, he learned that Brewster had played every instrument and performed all the vocals himself. In 2001, Brewster became the worship pastor at Bayside Church in Granite Bay. He was signed to Integrity's Vertical Music label with whom he released five albums between 1999 and 2006.

While working on his self-titled album (with producer Paul Mills), Brewster worked with label-mate Darrell Evans, contributing vocals, guitar, and co-writing on Evans' Freedom project. Brewster performed with Michael W. Smith during Smith's 1998 Live the Life tour. Brewster's second album, Live to Worship (produced by Jeff Quimby and co-produced by Brewster), was released in 2000. According to his biography on his official website, "Lincoln now combines his talents and determination to record songs that will minister to a new generation of believers." Brewster's album, Today Is the Day, was released on September 23, 2008. The album's first released single, was the title track "Today Is the Day".

On September 22, 2009, Brewster released a deluxe edition of Today Is the Day consisting of a CD with the same songs as Today Is the Day as well as a DVD containing two music videos, a few song stories, and a part of his instructional video. He released his latest project, Real Life, on September 28, 2010. The record features upbeat, contemporary worship tracks such as "Best Days" and the optimistic "Reaching For You". It also includes contemplative radio-ready songs such as the title track "Real Life", and the rhythmic "Whom Shall I Fear".

In 2012, Brewster released his first Christmas album, Joy to the World. A deluxe edition was released on November 5, 2013, with seven new tracks and an additional DVD. In 2014 Brewster released Oxygen, his ninth studio album after signing with Integrity Music after 15 years. He said the music had a "new sound", which explained the album's high sense of modern pop music with many riffs and guitar solos. In 2015, Lincoln Brewster released his first rendition of "The Star-Spangled Banner" as a surprise on the USA's Independence Day holiday. He was a part of the Winter Jam Tour 2015 West Coast. His most recent releases are God of the Impossible in 2018, A Mostly Acoustic Christmas in 2019, and Perfect Love in 2021.

== Equipment ==
Brewster primarily uses two different 1957 specification reissue Fender Stratocasters with DiMarzio pickups, one with Aztec Gold finish and the other with pearl Olympic white finish with both having an Ash body and maple fingerboard and neck. They have vintage looking tuners that are actually locking and a special active mid-boost circuit so that the single coil pickups can be made to sounds more like PAF humbuckers. Fender released his Artist signature model Stratocaster in August 2019.

Brewster achieves his live tone solely from a Line 6 POD HD500 unit. He occasionally uses a provided amp for stage noise only and goes direct to the PA system with the floor POD. Brewster also uses a Kemper Profiler amplifier live and in his home studio. He recently said in a live Facebook video that he recorded "No One Like Our God (One Take)" on the Line 6 Helix Native program directly from his guitar.

== Discography ==
=== Studio albums ===
List of studio albums, with selected chart positions
Title	Album details	Peak chart positions					
Title	Album details	US	US Christ	US Heat	US Indie	US Holiday	UK C&G
Lincoln Brewster	Released: April 21, 1999 (US); Label: Integrity Music; Formats: CD, digital download	—	—	—	—	—	—
Live to Worship	Released: May 17, 2000 (US); Label: Integrity; Formats: CD, digital download	—	—	—	—	—	—
Amazed	Released: July 16, 2002 (US); Label: Integrity; Formats: CD, digital download	—	25	26	—	—	—
Today Is the Day	Released: September 23, 2008 (US); Label: Integrity; Formats: CD, digital download	56	2	—	—	—	—
Real Life	Released: September 28, 2010 (US); Label: Integrity; Formats: CD, digital download	61	3	—	—	—	—
Joy to the World	Released: October 9, 2012 (US); Label: Integrity; Formats: CD, digital download	132	6	—	—	5	—
Oxygen	Released: August 19, 2014 (US); Label: Integrity; Formats: CD, digital download	51	2	—	—	—	20
God of the Impossible	Released: May 4, 2018 (US); Label: Integrity; Formats: CD, digital download	111	2	—	6	—	—
A Mostly Acoustic Christmas	Released: November 8, 2019; Label: Integrity	—	—	—	34	—	—
Perfect Love	Released: April 30, 2021 (US); Label: Integrity; Formats: CD, digital download	—	—	—	—	—	—
"—" denotes album that did not chart or was not released

=== Live albums ===
List of live albums, with selected chart positions and certifications
Title	Album details	Peak chart positions	
Title	Album details	US Christ	US Heat
All to You... Live	Released: August 30, 2005 (US); Label: Integrity; Formats: CD, digital download	28	40

=== Compilation albums ===
List of compilation albums, with selected chart positions
Title	Album details	Peak chart positions	
Title	Album details	US Christ	US Heat
Let the Praises Ring: The Best of Lincoln Brewster	Released: November 7, 2006 (US); Label: Integrity; Formats: CD, digital download	42	32

=== Singles ===
List of singles, with selected chart positions
Title	Year	Peak chart positions		Album
Title	Year	US Christ.	US Christ. Airplay	Album
"All to You"	2005	14		All to You... Live
"Caught in the Moment"	2006	—		Live to Worship
"Everlasting God"	2006	2		Let the Praises Ring
"Love the Lord"	2006	7		Let the Praises Ring
"Today Is the Day"	2008	14		Today Is the Day
"God You Reign"	2009	14		Today Is the Day
"Glory to God"	2009	38		Worship and Adore: A Christmas Offering
"Salvation Is Here"	2010	13		Today Is the Day
"The Power of Your Name"	2010	20		Today Is the Day
"Reaching for You"	2010	18		Real Life
"Little Drummer Boy" (featuring KJ-52)	2012	31		Joy to the World
"Made New"	2014	12	7	Oxygen
"Star Spangled Banner"	2015	—	—	non-album single
"There Is Power"	2015	9	5	Oxygen
"Let It Be Known"	2016	50	28	Oxygen
"Oxygen"	2016	26	22	Oxygen
"No One Like Our God"	2017	22	14	God of the Impossible
"Here I Am"	2018	—	—	God of the Impossible
"Everything"	2018	48	27	God of the Impossible
"While I Wait"	2018	31	28	God of the Impossible
"Who Am I"	2020	—	—	Perfect Love

=== Compilations ===
Album title	Release date	Songs
B.C./A.D.: Who Split Time?	1999	"What Kind of Man"
Youthlink: Beyond Sight	1999	"Shout to the Lord"
Only God for Me	1999	"More Faithful Than I"
Rock of Refuge: Acoustic Worship	2000	"Everybody Praise the Lord"
Millennium Worship 2	2001	"Psalm 91"
World's Best: Days of Elijah	2001	"The Power of Your Love"
Open the Eyes of My Heart, Volume 1	2001	"The Power of Your Love" "You Alone" "Lord, I Lift Your Name on High"
Creation Worships	2002	"The Power of Your Love" "Take Me Higher" "Lead Me"
Open the Eyes of My Heart, Volume 2	2002	"Take Me Higher" "Psalm 91" "God of Wonders" (guitar with Paul Baloche and Lamont Hiebert)
Songs 4 Worship: Modern	2002	"Shout to the Lord" "Lord, I Lift Your Name on High" "Take Me Higher" "Breathe" (with Jami Smith)
Absolute Worship	2004	"The Power of Your Love"
Vertical Momentum		"Let the Praises Ring"
You've Got Music		"Everybody Praise the Lord"
Everything Counts		"More Like You"
Offering of Worship		"You Are the One"
Brilliant Music of Today: Hear & Now	2005	Majestic
Worship Project H2.14	2005	"Majestic" "All the Earth Will Sing Your Praises" "Glory"
Cover the Earth	2005	"Love the Lord"
Arise: A Celebration of Worship	2006	"Let the Praises Ring" "All to You" "Another Hallelujah" "Everybody Praise the Lord"
iWorship Platinum	2006	"Shout to the Lord"
iWorship 24:7	2007	"Salvation is Here" "Everlasting God" "Love the Lord"
iWorship Connect	2009	"Today Is the Day" "Everlasting God"
Worship and Adore: A Christmas Offering	2009	"Glory to God" "Offering"

=== Collaborations ===
Title	Artist	Release date	Role(s)
For the Love of Strange Medicine	Steve Perry	1994	lead guitar, background vocals, assisted in songwriting
Freedom	Darrell Evans	1998	lead guitar, all other electric guitar, mandolin, collaborated in some songwriting
Twenty Three	Cindy Cruse-Ratcliff	2011	background vocals, lead guitar on one track

== Resources ==
- Lincoln Brewster Official Website biography
- Vertical Music profile for Lincoln Brewster
