= Let the Praises Ring =

Studio album by Lincoln Brewster
- Released: 2006, November 7
- Genre: Modern Worship
- Length: 77:45
- Label: Vertical
- Producer: Lincoln Brewster; Jeff Quimby; Paul Mills; Scott Williamson; Monroe Jones; Jeremy Redmon

Lincoln Brewster chronology
All to You... Live (2005)	Let the Praises Ring (2006)	Today Is the Day (2008)

Let the Praises Ring: The Best of Lincoln Brewster is a Christian worship music album by Lincoln Brewster released on November 7, 2006 by Integrity Music. This album compiles songs off Brewster's prior albums and includes two previously unreleased songs.

== Track listing ==
No.	Title	Writer(s)	Originally recorded on	Length
1.	"Everlasting God"	Brenton Brown, Ken Riley		4:47
2.	"All to You" (Radio Mix)	Lincoln Brewster, Reid McNulty	All to You... Live	4:17
3.	"Love the Lord" (Radio Mix)	Brewster	All to You... Live	3:20
4.	"Let the Praises Ring"	Brewster	Amazed	4:03
5.	"Everybody Praise the Lord"	Brewster	Amazed	3:48
6.	"Lord, I Lift Your Name on High"	Rick Founds	Live to Worship	3:30
7.	"All I Really Want"	Brewster	Amazed	5:18
8.	"All the Earth Will Sing Your Praises"	Paul Baloche		5:11
9.	"Majestic" (Radio Mix)	Brewster	All to You... Live	3:40
10.	"The Power of Your Love" (featuring Dan Haseltine)	Geoff Bullock	Live to Worship	4:24
11.	"Shout to the Lord"	Darlene Zschech	Live to Worship	5:52
12.	"He's All I Need"	Brewster	Lincoln Brewster	4:44
13.	"Everyday" (Radio Mix)	Joel Houston	All to You... Live	3:39
14.	"Take Me Higher (Psalm 73:25)"	Brewster	Live to Worship	5:08
15.	"What Kind of Man"	Brewster	Lincoln Brewster	4:31
16.	"You Are Good" (Live)	Israel Houghton	All to You... Live	5:08
17.	"Here I Am to Worship" (Instrumental)	Tim Hughes		6:25
Total length:				77:45
