= Joy to the World (Lincoln Brewster album) =

Studio album by Lincoln Brewster
- Released: October 9, 2012
- Studio: Brewhouse (Roseville, California); Club Wedge (Auburn, California)
- Genre: Christmas
- Length: 45:36
- Label: Integrity
- Producer: Lincoln Brewster; Colby Wedgeworth

Lincoln Brewster chronology
Real Life (2010)	Joy to the World (2012)	Oxygen (2014)

Joy to the World: A Christmas Collection by Lincoln Brewster is the eighth studio album, and first ever Christmas release recorded by contemporary worship musician Lincoln Brewster. The album was produced by Brewster along with Colby Wedgeworth, and it was released by Integrity Music. The album has seen commercial charting successes and positive critical attention.

== Background and release ==
The album was released on October 9, 2012 by Integrity Music, and it was produced by Lincoln Brewster and Colby Wedgeworth. This was the first Christmas album by Brewster.

== Critical reception ==
Professional ratings
Review scores
Source	Rating
Christian Music Zine	4.5/5 stars
Cross Rhythms	7/10 stars
Indie Vision Music	4/5 stars
Jesus Freak Hideout	3.5/5 stars
New Release Tuesday	4/5 stars
Worship Leader	3.5/5 stars

Joy to the World: A Christmas Collection garnered universally positive critical reception from music critics. At Worship Leader, they rated the album three-and-a-half stars, and said all the classic hallmarks of a Lincoln Brewster album are on the album with the Christmas elements in tow. Elliot Rose of Cross Rhythms rated the album a seven out of ten, and wrote that the album ended well. At Jesus Freak Hideout, Bert Gangl rated the album three-and-a-half stars, and alluded to how the album has some setbacks yet it comes "loaded with more wheat than chaff." Jonathan Andre of Indie Vision Music rated the album four stars, and proclaimed the album to be "certainly joyful".

At New Release Tuesday, Mary Nikkel rated the album four stars, and wrote that "Although the album draws wholly on already established songs, it does so with a lack of pretension and an enthusiastic tone which sinks into each selection." Kelly Sheads of New Release Tuesday rated the album four stars, and noted that the album makes a worthy contribution to Christmas projects. At Christian Music Zine, Joshua Andre rated the album four-and-a-half stars, and proclaimed it to be a "sublime and near-flawless effort!"

== Track listing ==
No.	Title	Writer(s)	Length
1.	"Joy to the World"	George Frederick Handel, Isaac Watts	3:23
2.	"Little Drummer Boy" (featuring KJ 52)	Katherine Kennicott Davis, Henry Onorati, Harry Simeone	2:54
3.	"Hark! The Herald Angels Sing"	Felix Mendelssohn, Chris Tomlin, Charles Wesley	3:08
4.	"Shout for Joy"	Paul Baloche, Lincoln Brewster, Jason Ingram	4:33
5.	"Our God"	Jonas Myrin, Matt Redman, Jesse Reeves, Tomlin	5:28
6.	"Miraculum (Instrumental)"	Brewster	6:19
7.	"O Come, O Come Emmanuel"	John Mason Neale, Henry Sloane Coffin	4:28
8.	"Do You Hear What I Hear?"	Noël Regney, Gloria Shayne Baker	4:43
9.	"O Holy Night (Another Hallelujah)"	Adolphe Adam, Leonard Cohen, John Sullivan Dwight	6:11
10.	"Silent Night"	Franz Xaver Gruber and Joseph Mohr	4:26
Total length:			45:36

== Charts ==
Chart (2012)	Peak position
US Billboard 200	132
US Christian Albums (Billboard)	6

== Personnel ==
- Lincoln Brewster – lead vocals, backing vocals, keyboards, programming, guitars, bass, drums, arrangements (1, 3–5, 7, 8, 10)
- Colby Wedgeworth – keyboards, programming, guitars, bass, drums, backing vocals, arrangements (1, 3–5, 7, 8, 10)
- Steve Padilla – keyboards
- Roman Vysochin – keyboards
- Kip Johns – bass
- Mike Johns – drums
- KJ-52 – rap (2)

Gang vocals

- Peter Burton
- Kelly Caldwell
- Tyler DeYoung
- Rachel Jackson
- Corbin Phillips
- Margie Ruiz
- Sarah Sherratt

=== Production ===
- Michael Coleman – executive producer
- C. Ryan Dunham – executive producer
- Chico Gonzalez – A&R
- Lincoln Brewster – producer, engineer
- Colby Wedgeworth – producer, engineer, mixing, mastering
- Tyler DeYoung – assistant engineer
- Mike Johns – assistant engineer
- Wilson Wedgeworth – assistant engineer
- Brandon Yip – assistant engineer
- Dave Taylor – production coordination
- Thom Hoyman – creative director
- Jeremy Cowart – photography
- Ben DeRienzo – art direction, design
