= Jessup University =

Private university in Rocklin, California

William Jessup University
- Former names: San Jose Bible College (1939–1989); San Jose Christian College (1989–2004); William Jessup University (2005–present)
- Motto: You were meant to make a difference. We'll get you ready.
- Type: Private university
- Established: 1939; 87 years ago
- Religious affiliation: Christian churches and churches of Christ
- Endowment: $1.1 million
- President: Meghan Simpkins
- Students: 1700+ full time equivalent
- Location: Rocklin, California, U.S. 38°49′14″N 121°17′33″W
- Campus: Suburban
- Colors: Jessup blue, Bright blue, and White
- Nickname: Warriors
- Sporting affiliations: NCAA Division II – PacWest
- Website: jessup.edu
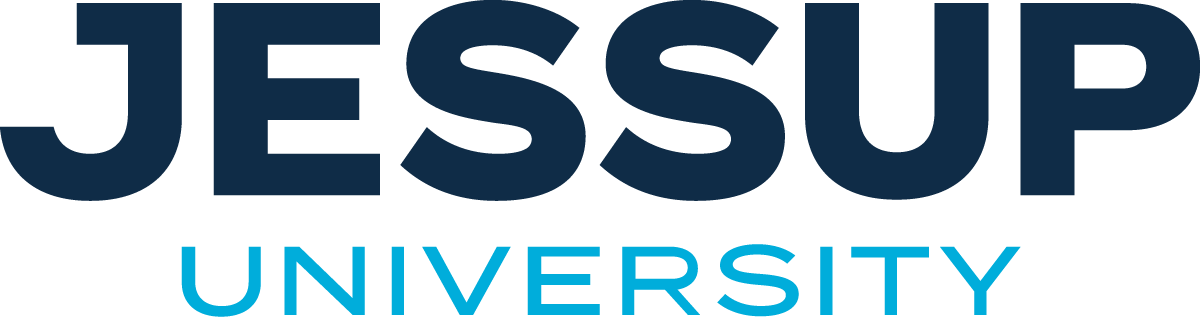

- Location within California

Jessup University (officially William Jessup University) is a private Christian university in Rocklin, California, United States, with additional sites in San Jose, California, and online. The university had 1,743 (over 1650 full-time equivalent) students during the 2019–20 academic year. Founded in 1939, it had a total undergraduate enrollment of 1,289 in the fall of 2020 on a 126-acre (51 ha) campus.

== History ==
The university was founded as San Jose Bible College in 1939, in San Jose by William Lee Jessup, the college's first president. Eugene Claremont Sanderson had originally started Evangel Bible University in San Jose in 1934 but was unable to make it viable. As a result, he recruited Jessup, one of his former students, to take over. By 1951, with the school expanding and the San José State University across the street encroaching, San Jose Bible College moved to a parcel bordered by Coyote Creek, 12th Street and nearly 30 years later by I-280. Spanish-style classroom buildings and several dormitory buildings made up the small campus.

William Jessup retired in 1960 and was succeeded by Alvan L. Tiffin. Later, Woodrow Phillips, an alumnus, was president from 1968 to 1979 and Chuck Boatman was president from 1979 to 1984. Bryce Leroy Jessup, a Pepperdine University alumnus and a son of the original president, was president from 1984 to 2010, when he retired. John Jackson, a former pastor at local megachurch Bayside Church, was selected to be the sixth president in March 2011.

In 1989, the school was renamed San Jose Christian College and regionally accredited by WASC in 2002. As administration was unable to find a new location in the Santa Clara Valley, they decided to move the institution to the Sacramento metropolitan city of Rocklin in April 2003. The college officially moved from its San Jose campus in June 2004. At this time the college was renamed William Jessup University. A branch campus has been retained in San Jose that primarily serves non-traditional and graduate students. In January 2023, the university underwent its third name change, rebranding as Jessup University.

The current location was formerly a Herman Miller Furniture Factory and many of the buildings were designed by Frank Gehry.

Since 2017, Jessup University has formally partnered with Placer County to address land conservation issues in the county. In 2022, the university and Placer County announced plans for the university to purchase a 487-acre piece of land known as the Clover Valley, with the goal of managing it as an ecological and recreational preserve.

In 2019, the university refinanced roughly $75 million in debt as bonds through the California Municipal Finance Authority. The origin of the debt is unclear, although the financing is earmarked as for the refinancing of "a portion of one or more loans used to acquire, construct, furnish and/or equip educational facilities of the Borrower’s campus." The school made little mention of the action, noting simply in one of its regular publications that "For the first time in our history, we have fixed rate long-term debt financing."

In 2020, the school announced a partnership with Bethel Church to create Bethel Music College. The school, which is accredited through Jessup, allows students to study with Bethel Music leaders and other industry experts while gaining credits that can be used toward a bachelor's degree. It is structured similarly to the university's partnership with another Bethel program known as the Bethel School of Technology, which operates a "nine-month technology bootcamp." Although the impact of the programs is unclear, Jessup, in a press release, noted that, in the fall of 2020, the "partnership program with Bethel brought in 150 students in the first four months of the program."

The press release further argued for the university's successful navigation of the disruption caused by the COVID-19 pandemic, stating that enrollment had grown by 6.5%, with the growth powered by an increase in online students, students in graduate programs, and students involved in the Bethel Music College program. The statistics presented, however, suggest a possible drop in traditional undergraduate students that has been "filled in" by growth in other areas.

However, as of 2024 it appears that Jessup and Bethel no longer maintain any partnership. Bethel Music has a different accreditation with TRACS and a search on Jessup University's site gives no results for Bethel.

The school added a Bachelor of Science in nursing program in 2023, which saw its first students in classes for the Spring semester.

On November 7, 2023, Multnomah University in Portland, Oregon, announced a merger with Jessup University in the setting of ongoing financial issues. Jessup University acquired about $30 million of Multnomah University's assets in a deal that cost only $7 million, stating an intent to preserve the Portland university as a satellite campus. However, shortly after the deal was accomplished, Jessup University's own ongoing financial difficulties led it to take out a large loan against the Multnomah Campus, and the closure of the Portland location was announced in May 2025.

In August of 2026, it was announced that Pat Gelsinger, a former CEO of Intel, had extended a $2 million loan to the university. The loan was reported to be part of a broader financial reorganization of the university. Gelsinger and his family have long had a relationship with the university. Reportedly, the loan was completed "at a particularly consequential moment for Jessup", as the university has recently delayed bond payments, held limited cash on hand, and fallen short on its goal of raising $6 million dollars through its "Road to Sustainability Initiative". Jessup University's Simpkins, however, claimed that the university had achieved "significant progress" and enrollment for the 2026-2027 school year met university goals.

Jessup inaugurated its seventh president, Meghan Simpkins, on October 7, 2026. Simpkins was previously the provost and senior vice president of Southeastern University in Florida.

=== LGBT controversies ===
William Jessup has a partial exception to Title IX which allows it to legally discriminate against LGBT students for religious reasons. The university's handbook states "Students who engage in unmarried heterosexual cohabitation or any homosexual/bisexual activity will be subject to judicial action".

A student and cross-country athlete claims that he was kicked out of the university in 2014 for being gay. In response to the student's claims, university president John Jackson stated that "we do not discriminate against students based on their sexual orientation. However, student participation in WJU is a voluntary association governed by a biblically-based code of conduct for every student enrolled at the University."

A group of students filed a lawsuit in 2021 arguing that the school should not receive federal funding while subjecting LGBT students to denial of housing and health care, expulsion, shame, loneliness, and sexual and physical harassment. The lawsuit was dismissed by federal judge Ann Aiken.

In 2023, the university's previous president, John Jackson, made controversial statements online, especially about social issues. In his personal blog, he stated that he has "observed at least five cultural giants of our time: historical revisionism, abortion and euthanasia, religious repression, racism and injustice, identity and family" and is "'against' these five giants". He also "believe[s] that a socialist economic and political system is the greatest natural threat to religious liberty around the world." He also was one of the first religious leaders in the state of California to advocate the return to in-person religious services during the COVID-19 pandemic, calling for the "restoration of 100% of building capacities" by July 2020.

In response to LGBT policies and other controversial steps, current and previous students have shared their stories and frustrations with the university's policies and practices on the 2020 blog Liberated Jessupians.

== Academics ==
Jessup offers 22 undergraduate majors, 11 graduate programs, 1 doctorate, 5 certificate programs, and 18 fully online programs. The university is accredited by the WASC Senior College and University Commission with some programs accredited by discipline-specific accreditors.

Academic programs at the university are offered in six schools:

- School of Business, Arts & Humanities
- School of Education
- School of Natural and Applied Sciences
- School of Psychology
- School of Theology and Leadership
- Multnomah Biblical Seminary

The university also hosts one institute, the Institute for Public Policy.

== Athletics ==
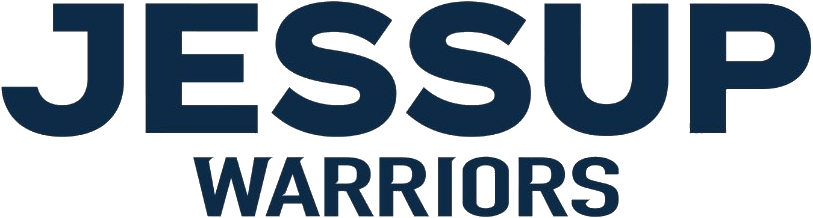
Jesus Athletics wordmark

The Jessup athletic teams are called the Warriors. The university is a member of the National Collegiate Athletic Association (NCAA), primarily competing in the Pacific West Conference (PacWest) since the 2024–25 academic year. The Warriors previously competed in the National Association of Intercollegiate Athletics (NAIA), first in the California Pacific Conference (Cal Pac) from 2004–05 to 2013–14 and then the Golden State Athletic Conference (now the Great Southwest Athletic Conference; GSAC) until 2023–24. In the summer of 2023, the school announced that it had been accepted into NCAA Division II and would compete in the PacWest starting in the fall of 2024.

Jessup competes in 16 intercollegiate varsity sports: Men's sports include baseball, basketball, cross country, golf, soccer, tennis and track & field; while women's sports include basketball, cross country, golf, soccer, softball, stunt, tennis, track & field and volleyball.

== Notable alumni ==
- Justin Downer, college basketball coach
- JJ Heller, singer

== See also ==
- List of colleges and universities in California
