= Real Life (Lincoln Brewster album) =

Studio album by Lincoln Brewster
- Released: September 28, 2010
- Genre: Contemporary worship music
- Length: 45:48
- Label: Integrity
- Producer: Lincoln Brewster

Lincoln Brewster chronology
Today Is the Day (2008)	Real Life (2010)	Joy to the World (2012)

Real Life is the seventh studio album recorded by contemporary worship musician Lincoln Brewster.

== Track listing ==
No.	Title	Writer(s)	Length
1.	"Best Days"	Lincoln Brewster, Mia Fieldes	4:25
2.	"Reaching for You"	Brewster, Glenn Packiam	4:45
3.	"More Than Amazing"	Brewster, Fieldes	4:43
4.	"Real Life"	Brewster, Fieldes	5:19
5.	"So Good"	Paul Baloche, Brewster, Fieldes	4:28
6.	"I Belong to You"	Sam Mizell, Jamie Moore, Annie Mosley	4:02
7.	"Whom Shall I Fear" (featuring Kari Jobe)	Brewster, Fieldes	5:26
8.	"Loved By You"	Baloche, Brewster	4:40
9.	"Made for More"	Brewster, Fieldes	3:31
10.	"Shout for Joy"	Baloche, Brewster, Jason Ingram	4:31
Total length:			45:48

== Album credits ==
=== Production ===
- Michael Coleman – executive producer
- Lincoln Brewster – producer
- Mike Johns – production assistant
- Jay King – A&R/artist development
- Chico Gonzalez – A&R/artist development coordination
- Rick Thompson – A&R/Artist development coordination
- Anita Channell – production coordinator
- Sam Noerr – art direction
- Jeremy Cowart – photography
- Gary Dorsey – package design at Pixel Peach Studio

Technical

- Lincoln Brewster – recording and engineering at Brewhouse Studio, mixing (1-5, 9) at Brewhouse Studio
- Russ Long – additional engineer
- Chris Carmichael – string recording (4)
- J.R. McNeely – mixing (6-8, 10) at ELM Studio South (Nashville, Tennessee)
- Nathan Dantzler – mastering at The Hit Lab (Nashville, Tennessee)

=== Musicians ===
- Lincoln Brewster – lead vocals, backing vocals, keyboards, programming, electric guitars, acoustic guitars
- Blair Masters – keyboards, Hammond B3 organ
- Steve Padilla – keyboards
- Jacob Sooter – keyboards
- Tyler DeYoung – additional acoustic guitars (3)
- Levi Brewster – guitar punch-ins (4)
- Liam Brewster – guitar punch-in assistant (4)
- Norm Stockton – bass
- Mike Johns – drums, percussion
- Chris Carmichael – strings (4)
- Jeffrey B. Scott – backing vocals, choir director
- Kari Jobe – harmony vocals (7)
- Liam Brewster, Peter Burton, Kelli Caldwell, Tyler DeYoung, Taylor Gall, Rachel Jackson, Mark Johnston, Cindy Maslov, Sandi Padilla, Steve Padilla, Corbin Phillips, Margie Ruiz, Jeffrey B. Scott and Sarah Sherratt – choir
