= Today's the Day =

Today's the Day may refer to:

- Today's the Day (game show), a British television daytime quiz programme, 1993–99
- "Today's the Day" (America song), 1976
- "Today's the Day" (Sean Maguire song), 1997
- "Today's the Day" (Pink song), 2015
- Today's the Day – A Chronicle of the Curious, a 1979 book by Jeremy Beadle
- "Today's the Day" (Doctors), a 2003 television episode
- "Today's the Day", a 2002 song by Aimee Man from Lost in Space
- "Today's the Day", a 2019 song by Kelly Clarkson from UglyDolls

== See also ==
- The Day Today, a 1994 UK comedy show
- Today Is the Day (disambiguation)
