= Brave New World (Amanda Cook album) =

Studio album by Amanda Cook
- Released: September 25, 2015
- Recorded: 2015
- Genres: Contemporary Christian music; worship
- Length: 66:38
- Label: Bethel Music
- Producers: Jason Ingram; Paul Mabury; Amanda Cook

Amanda Cook chronology
In Between the Now & Then (2010)	Brave New World (2015)	House on a Hill (2019)

Singles from Brave New World
- 1. "Heroes" Released: September 4, 2015

Brave New World is the fourth album from Canadian Christian singer Amanda Cook and her first album not to be released under "Amanda Falk", her maiden name. The album was released through Bethel Music on September 25, 2015. Cook also studio recorded two songs from previous Bethel Music albums. Joel Taylor and Brian Johnson executively produced the album.

== Critical reception ==
Professional ratings
Review scores
Source	Rating
365 Days of Inspiring Media	4.5/5 stars
CCM Magazine	4/5 stars
The Christian Beat	4.5/5 stars
Jesus Freak Hideout	4/5 stars
New Release Today	4.5/5 stars
Worship Leader	4/5 stars

Matt Conner, rating the album four stars from CCM Magazine, describes, "The ethereal feel of Brave New World helps Bethel Music's Amanda Cook carve out an impressive and instant niche on her debut solo recording." Indicating in a four star review by Worship Leader, Gary Durbin says, "With this full-length album, you'll experience a very meditative and deep worship journey. I have had this on repeat, and it has been a beautiful soundtrack for personal worship." Joshua Andre, allotting the album four and a half stars by 365 Days of Inspiring Media, responds, "A brilliant album for a well-respected singer songwriter and worship leader!"

Awarding the album four and a half stars at New Release Today, Caitlin Lassiter states, "Amanda Cook has created a beautiful atmosphere of genuine worship and praise with Brave New World." Madeleine Dittmer, giving the album four and a half stars for The Christian Beat, writes, "Brave New World will have you worshiping along with the gracefully written songs from the first listen." Signaling in a four star review from Jesus Freak Hideout, Lucas Munachen responds, "For those looking for songs that are a little more personal than the flashy lights of the stage, taking a voyage to Amanda Cook's new world is definitely worth the while."

== Awards and accolades ==
On August 11, 2016, the Gospel Music Association was announced that Brave New World would be nominated for a GMA Dove Award in the Inspirational Album of the Year category at the 47th Annual GMA Dove Awards.

On October 11, 2016, Brave New World won the GMA Dove Award for Inspirational Album of the Year with producers Jason Ingram, Paul Mabury and Amanda Cook being the recipients.

== Singles ==
"Heroes" was released to Christian radio as the lead single from the album on September 4, 2015.

== Track listing ==
Standard edition
No.	Title	Writer(s)	Length
1.	"Heroes"	Amanda Cook; Jason Ingram; Paul Mabury	4:17
2.	"Shepherd"	Cook	5:49
3.	"The Voyage"	Cook; Steffany Gretzinger; Jonathan David Helser; Melissa Helser	6:17
4.	"Never See the End"	Cook; Ingram; Mabury	5:29
5.	"Mercy"	Cook; Gretzinger	4:03
6.	"Flagship" (Instrumental)	Amanda Cook	2:15
7.	"Kind"	Cook	4:45
8.	"Closer"	Cook	5:15
9.	"Bitter/Sweet"	Cook; Ingram; Mabury	5:45
10.	"Highest Praise"	Cook	6:13
11.	"Brave New World" (Instrumental)	Cook; Bobby Strand	1:59
12.	"City of Hope"	Cook	5:08
13.	"Pieces"	Cook; Gretzinger	9:23

== Chart performance ==
Chart (2015)	Peak position
Canadian Albums (Billboard)	18
Scottish Albums (Official Charts)	87
UK Albums (Official Charts)	93
UK Album Downloads (Official Charts)	33
UK Independent Albums (Official Charts)	12
UK Christian & Gospel Albums (OCC)	1
US Christian Albums (Billboard)	1
US Digital Albums (Billboard)	12
US Billboard 200	20
