= People (Hillsong United album) =

Live album by Hillsong United
- Released: 26 April 2019
- Venue: Sydney
- Genre: Contemporary worship music
- Length: 73:23
- Label: Hillsong, Capitol CMG
- Producer: Joel Houston, Michael Guy Chislett

Hillsong United chronology
Wonder (2017)	People (2019)	In the Meantime (2020)

Singles from People
- 1. "Good Grace" Released: 7 December 2018; 2. "Whole Heart (Hold Me Now)" Released: 11 January 2019; 3. "As You Find Me" Released: 9 February 2019; 4. "Another in the Fire" Released: 1 May 2020

People is the fourteenth live album from Australian contemporary worship music band Hillsong United. It was released on 26 April 2019, through Hillsong Music and Capitol Christian Music Group. The writing process for the album involved biblical influences, having the role as worship music for Hillsong, and its musical style involves a youthful influence, with use of acoustic instruments within recording.

Recorded on 18 November 2018 at Hills Campus in Sydney, upon release, the album received generally positive reviews by critics, receiving a rating of 4.5 out of 5 from critics such as 365 Days of Inspiring Media. The album debuted at No. 6 on the Australian ARIA Albums Chart, No. 2 on the US Billboard 200, as well as the Canadian Albums Chart. People won the Worship Album of Year at the 50th Dove Awards in 2019, while its deluxe edition was also nominated to Worship Album of Year at the 51st Dove Awards in 2020.

To promote the album, Hillsong United toured the United States for the first time in three years, and also released an accompanying film. In the lead up to the release of People (Live), Hillsong United released a range of promotional material for the album, including promotional videos and merchandise. Songs from the album has been played at over 1,000 Hillsong campus, with the songs 'Good Grace' and 'Whole Heart' collectively receiving over 32 million streams as of May 2019, a month after the release of the full album. On 20 July 2019, Hillsong United teamed up with Spotify to release four acoustic songs from the album, along with four music videos. On 1 May 2020, a studio version of "Another in the Fire", featuring Taya Gaukrodger, was released as a single.

== Background ==
Joel Houston, leader of Hillsong United, stated that part of the message of the album is "accepting that we are flawed – but that God is madly in love with us". Jonathan Douglass further explained that the title of the album is "self-explanatory", saying its intention is "to connect with people and actually unite people".

=== Accolades ===
Year	Organization	Award	Result	Ref.
2019	GMA Dove Awards	Worship Album of the Year	Won	
2020	GMA Dove Awards	Worship Album of the Year (Deluxe edition)	Nominated	

Year-end lists
Publication	Accolade	Rank	Ref.
365 Days of Inspiring Media	Top 50 Albums of 2019	10	
NewReleaseToday	Top 10 Worship Albums of 2019	2	

== Writing and production ==
"Another in the Fire - Live"
'Another in the Fire' is a single from the album, released on 15 March 2019. The lyrics within this extract demonstrate the biblical influences of the writing within People (Live).

Writing for People (Live) was done by various members of the Hillsong United band, such as Joel Houston and Matt Crocker.

As Hillsong United is a branch of evangelical church, Hillsong, their writing process involves biblical influences. This requires that, after writing, their lyrics go through extra levels of approval from those within the church and the band to ensure its appropriateness and biblical accuracy.

People (Live) was recorded at Hillsong Worship and Creative Conference in Sydney on 18 November 2018 by Ben Whincop and was produced by Joel Houston and Michael Guy Chrislett.

Each of the songs on this album is written in a similar format by a variety of members of the band, crediting a total of twelve individuals as the writers. Hillsong United's music as a whole has a specific role as worship music for the Church. The writing process involves consideration of this role in order to create music that can easily be replicated and can resonate with a wide Christian audience.

As Hillsong United is a part of the large branch of Hillsong Church, their album release schedule differs from most conventional bands. Hillsong's various bands release a range of albums each year, following a distinct release schedule. The church typically releases a live album each year, as such, People (Live) was released on 26 April 2019. This album release schedule acts in accordance with the Hillsong Church conferences throughout the year, with an album being released each year following one of their conferences. These include conferences such as their 'Colour Conference,' the women's conference which typically falls within the first three months of the year, and 'Hillsong Conference', which typically falls between June and August. In 2019, People (Live) was released on 26 April following the Hillsong Worship and Creative Conference at the end of 2018.

== Musical style and themes ==
Members of Hillsong United have stated that the musical style within People (Live) differs from their previous albums.

The tone of this album is darker with less use of electronic instruments which create the upbeat tone used in pop music, and more use of acoustic instrumentals. Joel Houston, member of Hillsong United, revealed that they felt as though the group was "stagnant" so within production of this album, they altered their tone and style to maintain motivation within the band.

The genre of this album has been described as contemporary Christian worship music, and, like their other albums, has been described in terms of its youthful style. The targeted audience of this album, and others by Hillsong United, is reflected by the incorporation of contemporary rock into their musical style. Songs on this album also feature synthesised and electronic sounds which mirror the music style of pop and dance music. Hillsong Church has a variety of bands, such as Hillsong Worship and Hillsong Young and Free, each with differing styles, targeting different demographics of their Church. Hillsong United's music and marketing has been characterized as having a youth-orientated focus, targeting the younger generation of Christianity.

The theme of People (Live), like others by Hillsong, surrounds a focus on shared experiences within Christianity. The band has promoted and explained this theme through various avenues. The band stated that they created this album 'to bring unity amongst people everywhere' and 'to love God and love people as people loved by God'. In the product description of the album on the Hillsong store, the band states that their slight change in musical style in this album was done to demonstrate, 'the utter reliance on God and the fact that we are called to look at life through an uncomplicated lens of loving people.'

== Release and promotion ==
"Good Grace - Live"
Excerpt from 'Good Grace,' the first single released from this album on 7 December 2018.

People (Live) was released 26 April 2019 by the Hillsong label and the Capital Christian Music Group label.

The release of this album was preceded by the release of the single Good Grace' on 7 December 2018. Following this was the release of 'Whole Heart (Hold Me Now)' on 11 January 2019, then followed by 'As You Find Me' on 9 February 2019, and finally, the single 'Another in the Fire' released on 15 March 2019. Since release of these singles, they were performed across Hillsong campus churches, promoting the release of the upcoming album, 'People'.

In promotion of this album, the band toured the United States, releasing a concert film of these performances. It includes a music video for each song on the album. It features footage of the band and the crowd during their tour of the United States. It was directed by Nathaniel Redekop and Richard Cause, and produced by Michael Guy Chislett, Joel Houston, Johnny Rays, and Jill Casey under the studio Umusic. This concert film also includes songs from other Hillsong bands, such as, the Hillsong Worship song 'What a Beautiful Name,' which won a Grammy for Best Contemporary Christian Music Performance/Song in 2017. It also includes songs from their previous albums such as 'Oceans (Where Feet my Fail)', which won four awards in the 2014 GMA Dove Awards.

== Marketing ==
Hillsong has a designated marketing team for their church that releases promotional content for their upcoming albums.

Hillsong and its subsequent bands market their upcoming albums largely through social media. Each of their bands and church campuses have individual Instagram accounts, with Hillsong United currently possessing a following of over 2 million. In the lead up to People (Live)'s release, Hillsong United released trailers via social media to promote its release, using the hashtag #UnitedPeople to increase visibility. These promotional videos featured recordings from tours, including behind the scenes footage, narrated by, Hillsong United member, Joel Houston. During Hillsong's weekly church services, they featured promotional footage for the album in their 'Church News.' Hillsong markets itself using a Hillsong logo, this is used in promotion of this album in order to identify itself with the Hillsong brand.

The band also participated in a performance and interview with Good Morning America in the week of the album's release to promote its release.

=== Merchandise ===
Hillsong sells various items through their 'Hillsong store' including branded clothing, hats, journals, and more. This is sold through their online store and physical pop-up stores at local church campuses and conferences. Hillsong United has its own branch of merchandise for the People (Live) album, selling the album in forms such as CD or vinyl and apparel such as t-shirts. The Hillsong store, in its description for the People (Live) t-shirt, says, 'Spread the message in this fresh white t-shirt.'

=== Artwork and visuals ===
The album cover of People (Live) was designed and created by Nathan Cahyadi, Nick Dellis and Nathanial Redekop. It features a digitally edited picture of a crowd at a Hillsong service, representing the theme of the album, the ‘people.’

Music videos were released for each song on the album and were recorded at the Hillsong Worship and Creative Conference in Sydney in 2018, at the same time as the audio was recorded. There are additional visuals to each song as a part of the concert film, released after their tour of the United States, featuring footage from their performance at Madison Square Garden, an arena in New York City.

== Commercial performance ==
In Australia, People debuted on the ARIA Albums Chart at No. 6.

In the United States, People sold 107,000 equivalent album units in its opening week, thus debuting at No. 2 on the mainstream Billboard 200 chart (dated 2 May). Being their third top ten appearance on Billboard 200, the album is the highest ranking appearance for Hillsong United on the chart beating out the No. 5 debuts by Empires (2015) and Zion (2013), while breaking their best sales week record, formerly held by Empires. The album concurrently registered at No. 1 on Billboard Christian Albums chart.

== Reception ==
=== Critical ===
The release of People (Live) gained status as Hillsong United's biggest sales week as of its release in 2019. It debuted at No. 1 on Billboard's Top Christian Albums, No. 1 on Top Album Sales with the most sales in that week, and No. 2 on the Billboard Top 200. Within its first week, People (Live) received over 8 million streams and sold over 100 thousand albums.

Hillsong United received generally positive reviewed from critics for People (Live). Jessica Morris, an internationally published journalist, in a review for 'Others' wrote that the album has a 'superb production value and artistry with an authenticity rarely seen in worship.' Joshua Andre in a review for 365 Days of Inspiring Media rated People a 4.5 out of 5 stars. Josh Balogh, a music reviewer with a bachelor's degree in Biblical Studies also rated the album a 4.5, noting, ‘despite their musical direction changing, they have remained accessible,’ in his review for Jesus Freak Hideout. Similarly, Timothy Yap, a senior editor for Jubilee Cast with a broad career in journalism, such as working as a researcher and teacher at Florida State University for journalism, rated the album a 4.75 out of 5 stars.

Others in the music field have also commended the album, with the National Music and Media manager of Koorong stating, ‘the thing I love most about People is how the raw energy captured in the live recording transports me back to the early days of UNITED.' Reviews such as this highlight the generally positive feedback from critics surrounding Hillsong United's change in musical style and choice of live production.

=== Impact and response ===
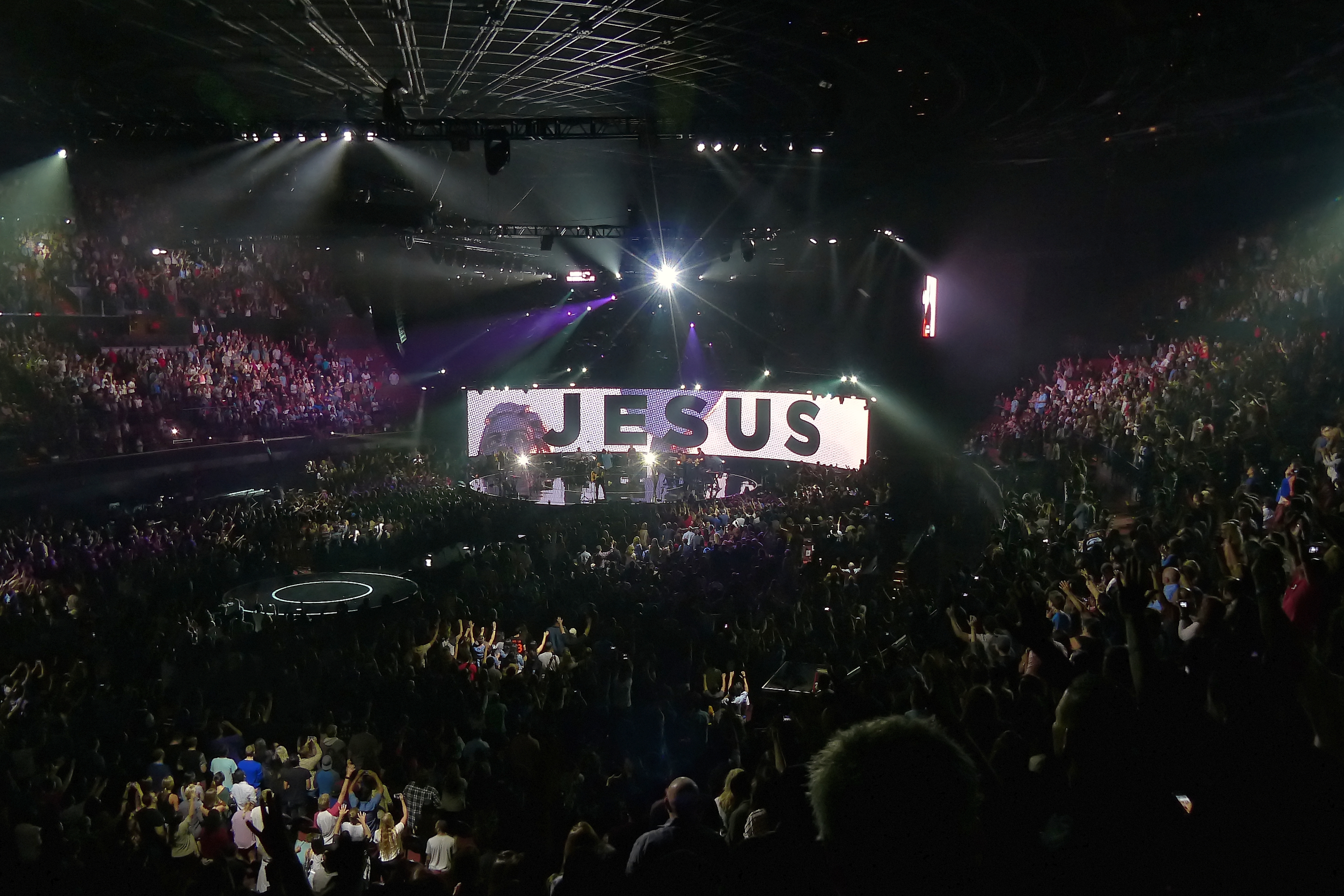
Hillsong United performing at The Forum in California in 2014.

People (Live) was first performed as a whole on 18 November 2018 at the time of its recording, prior to its release as it is a live album in 2019. Hillsong's live albums typically follow this process. The album was played in its entirety for the first time at the Hillsong Worship and Creative Conference in 2018 and was recorded at this time. Within the recording, singing and cheering from the crowd at this performance is featured throughout and can be heard within the background of the songs.

With the release of People (Live) and other albums by Hillsong United, the band provides technical aides such as backing tracks and sheet music. On the Hillsong store, along with the CD and vinyl version of the album, they offer the album in the form of a music book for US$25, sheet music for US$20 and the instrumental for US$10. The inclusion of these aides has the intention of making it easier for other bands and churches across the world to replicate their music. This assistance has meant that their album has been able to be played at almost 1,100 Hillsong campuses across the world, and also, other churches. Churches such as Bethel Church are among the many that perform songs from People at their weekly services.

The most popular songs on this album are 'Whole Heart' with 96 million streams on Spotify, followed by 'Another in the Fire' and 'Good Grace' with 79 million and 66 million streams respectively as of May 16, 2024.

== Track listing ==
Standard edition
No.	Title	Writer(s)	Worship leader(s)	Length
1.	"Ready or Not"	Joel Houston; Marty Sampson	Joel Houston; Taya Gaukrodger; Jad Gillies	05:53
2.	"Here's to the One"	Matt Crocker; Houston; Benjamin Hastings; Aodhan King; Dylan Thomas	Jonathon Douglass	03:37
3.	"Might Sound Wild"	Crocker; Houston	Matt Crocker; Joel Houston	06:16
4.	"Whole Heart (Hold Me Now)"	Houston; King	Taya Gaukrodger; Aodhan King	07:30
5.	"As You Find Me"	Houston; Crocker; Hastings	Tulele Faletolu; Taya Gaukrodger	08:43
6.	"Clean"	Michael Fatkin; Taya Gaukrodger; Hannah Hobbs	Taya Gaukrodger	02:29
7.	"Starts and Ends"	Houston; Brooke Ligertwood	Joel Houston; Brooke Ligertwood	08:11
8.	"Highlands (Song of Ascent)"	Houston; Hastings	Benjamin Hastings	06:31
9.	"Holy Ground"	Crocker; Hastings; Ben Fielding; King	Matt Crocker	05:34
10.	"Another in the Fire"	Chris Davenport; Houston	Chris Davenport	06:34
11.	"Good Grace"	Houston	Joel Houston; Taya Gaukrodger; Jad Gillies	05:54
12.	"Echoes (Till We See the Other Side)"	Hastings; Houston; Fielding	Joel Houston; Benjamin Hastings	06:23
Total length:				73:24

Deluxe edition bonus tracks
No.	Title	Writer(s)	Worship leader(s)	Length
13.	"Good Grace" (acoustic)	Houston	Joel Houston; Taya Gaukrodger	04:40
14.	"Whole Heart (Hold Me Now)" (acoustic)	Houston; King	Taya Gaukrodger; Aodhan King	05:41
15.	"Another in the Fire" (acoustic)	Davenport; Houston	Joel Houston; Taya Gaukrodger; Matt Crocker	05:38
16.	"Highlands (Song of Ascent)" (acoustic)	Houston; Hastings	Benjamin Hastings	05:59
17.	"Holy Ground" (acoustic)	Crocker; Hastings; Fielding; King	Matt Crocker	03:28
18.	"Here's to the One" (acoustic)	Crocker; Houston; Hastings; King; Thomas	Matt Crocker; Taya Gaukrodger	03:10
19.	"Good Grace" (radio edit)	Houston	Joel Houston; Jad Gillies; Taya Gaukrodger	04:00
Total length:				105:53

Deluxe edition re-release bonus track
No.	Title	Writer(s)	Worship leader(s)	Length
20.	"Another in the Fire" (studio version)	Davenport; Houston	Taya Gaukrodger	04:26
Total length:				110:28

== Tour ==
Hillsong United toured the United States in early to mid-2019 to promote the album. Amanda Lindsey Cook and Mack Brock were the opening acts of the tour. The tour performed at venues in 29 U.S. cities, including the Staples Center in Los Angeles and Madison Square Garden in New York City. The tour was extended, ending at Mercedes-Benz Stadium in Atlanta, Georgia for the annual Passion Conferences on 31 December 2019.

=== The People Tour: Live from Madison Square Garden ===
On 21 January 2021, Hillsong United announced the release of a live album and concert film featuring the group's 2 July concert at Madison Square Garden in New York City. The album, The People Tour: Live From Madison Square Garden, was released on 29 January 2021.

Disc one
No.	Title	Writer(s)	Worship leader(s)	Length
1.	"Ready or Not"	Joel Houston; Marty Sampson	Joel Houston; Taya Gaukrodger; Jad Gillies	05:33
2.	"Wonder"	Houston; Matt Crocker	Matt Crocker	04:37
3.	"Relentless" (Remix)	Crocker; Houston	Jonathon Douglass; Taya Gaukrodger	03:45
4.	"Touch the Sky"	Houston; Dylan Thomas; Michael Guy Chislett	Taya Gaukrodger	04:36
5.	"Interlude"		Joel Houston	01:22
6.	"Behold (Then Sings My Soul)"	Houston	Joel Houston; Taya Gaukrodger; Matt Crocker	06:37
7.	"Whole Heart (Hold Me Now)"	Houston; Aodhan King	Taya Gaukrodger; Jad Gillies	07:30
8.	"Highlands (Song of Ascent)"	Houston; Benjamin Hastings	Benjamin Hastings	05:37
9.	"Broken Vessels (Amazing Grace)"	Houston; Jonas Myrin	Taya Gaukrodger	01:25
10.	"Another in the Fire"	Chris Davenport; Houston	Chris Davenport	06:46
11.	"What a Beautiful Name"	Ben Fielding; Brooke Ligertwood	Taya Gaukrodger; Jad Gillies	04:29

Disc two
No.	Title	Writer(s)	Worship leader(s)	Length
1.	"Not Today"	Houston; Crocker	Taya Gaukrodger	04:53
2.	"As You Find Me"	Houston; Crocker; Hastings	Joel Houston; Matt Crocker; Taya Gaukrodger; Jad Gillies	05:44
3.	"The Stand"	Houston	Joel Houston	03:01
4.	"From the Inside Out / Came to My Rescue"	Houston; Sampson; Thomas; Joel Davies	Jad Gillies	04:00
5.	"Rain / Reign"	Houston; Crocker	Matt Crocker; Taya Gaukrodger; Jad Gillies	02:50
6.	"O Praise the Name (Anástasis)"	Hastings; Sampson; Dean Ussher	Jad Gillies	01:19
7.	"Starts and Ends" (featuring Amanda Lindsey Cook)	Houston; Ligertwood	Matt Crocker; Amanda Lindsey Cook	08:02
8.	"So Will I (100 Billion X)"	Benjamin Hastings; Houston; Michael Fatkin	Benjamin Hastings	08:11
9.	"With Everything"	Houston	Joel Houston; Jad Gillies	05:36
10.	"Oceans (Where Feet May Fail)"	Houston; Crocker; Salomon Ligthelm	Taya Gaukrodger	07:24
11.	"Good Grace"	Houston	Joel Houston; Jad Gillies; Amanda Lindsey Cook	07:30
12.	"Echoes (Till We See the Other Side)" (featuring Mack Brock)	Hastings; Houston; Fielding	Joel Houston; Benjamin Hastings; Mack Brock	07:09
Total length:				1:57:34

== Personnel ==
Credits from Zendesk.

Hillsong United

- Michael Guy Chislett – electric guitar
- Matt Crocker – vocals, acoustic guitar
- Jonathon Douglass – vocals
- Jad Gillies – vocals, electric guitar
- Joel Houston – vocals, acoustic guitar, piano
- Taya Gaukrodger – vocals
- Benjamin Hastings – vocals
- Simon Kobler – drums, percussion
- Jihea Oh – bass guitar
- Benjamin Tennikoff – piano, keyboard, synthesizer
- Dylan Thomas – electric guitar

Additional musicians

- Chris Davenport (Hillsong NYC) – vocals
- Tulele Faletolu (past Hillsong United musician) – vocals
- Brooke Ligertwood (Hillsong Worship / past Hillsong United musician) – vocals
- Aodhan King (Hillsong Young & Free) – vocals
- Matt Tennikoff (past Hillsong United musician) – bass guitar
- Nathan Hughes – keys

Additional vocals

- Dee Uluirewa (vocal coach)
- Alex Epa Iosefa (Hillsong Young & Free)
- Renee Sieff (Hillsong Young & Free)
- Rachel Helms
- Michelle Cook
- Ashley-Morgan Alexander
- Darian Bass
- Darnell Barrett
- Tim Nakao

== Charts ==
=== Weekly charts ===
Chart (2019)	Peak position
Australian Albums (ARIA)	6
Canadian Albums (Billboard)	2
New Zealand Albums (RMNZ)	22
Swiss Albums (Schweizer Hitparade)	19
US Billboard 200	2
US Top Christian Albums (Billboard)	1

=== Year-end charts ===
Chart (2019)	Position
US Christian Albums (Billboard)	5
Chart (2020)	Position
US Christian Albums (Billboard)	13
Chart (2021)	Position
US Christian Albums (Billboard)	25
Chart (2022)	Position
US Christian Albums (Billboard)	47
Chart (2023)	Position
US Christian Albums (Billboard)	58
