= Today Is the Day (Lincoln Brewster album) =

Studio album by Lincoln Brewster
- Released: September 23, 2008
- Length: 49:26
- Label: Integrity/Columbia
- Producer: Lincoln Brewster

Lincoln Brewster chronology
Let the Praises Ring (2006)	Today Is the Day (2008)	Real Life (2010)

Today Is the Day is the fourth studio album from contemporary Christian musician Lincoln Brewster. It was released on September 23, 2008 and debuted at No. 56 on the Billboard 200. Lincoln has embedded many personal connections into the audio on this record, the foremost of which is his son's unborn heartbeat, setting the tempo in the first seconds of "The Power of Your Name".

== Release ==
The song "Today is the Day" marked the first all-new studio single released by Brewster since 2002, in his album Amazed. Christianity Today's Russ Breimeier attributed this six-year hiatus in new material to Brewster's new family and to his responsibilities as Worship Arts pastor at Bayside Church nearby Sacramento, California. The song's lyrics were written by Paul Baloche, combining the themes of Bible verses Matthew 6 and Psalm 118. The second track, "Everywhere I Go", was written with Glenn Packiam, a member of Desperation Band.

== Track listing ==
Album release
No.	Title	Writer(s)	Length
1.	"Today Is the Day"	Paul Baloche, Lincoln Brewster	4:36
2.	"Everywhere I Go"	Brewster, Glenn Packiam	4:52
3.	"Give Him Praise" (featuring Israel Houghton)	Brewster	4:55
4.	"God You Reign"	Brewster, Mia Fieldes	6:10
5.	"The Arms of My Savior"	Brewster	5:08
6.	"This Love"	Brewster, Fieldes	4:27
7.	"The Power of Your Name" (featuring Darlene Zschech)	Brewster, Fieldes	5:44
8.	"The Love of God"	Brewster, Fieldes	3:50
9.	"Salvation Is Here"	Joel Houston	4:51
10.	"Let Your Glory Shine"	Brewster, Fieldes	4:53
Total length:			49:26

== Personnel ==
- Lincoln Brewster – lead vocals, backing vocals, keyboards, Hammond B3 organ, electric guitars, acoustic guitars, bass guitar (4, 6, 7), drums, drum programming, vocal arrangements
- Steve Padilla – keyboards, Hammond B3 organ
- Chris Miller – keyboards, Hammond B3 organ
- Jeffrey B. Scott – keyboards, Hammond B3 organ, backing vocals, vocal arrangements, choir director (3, 4)
- Nancy Finch – keyboards, Hammond B3 organ
- Norm Stockton – bass guitar (1–3, 5, 8–10)
- Mike Johns – drums, drum programming
- Israel Houghton – guest lead vocals (3)
- Darlene Zschech – guest lead vocals (7)
- Liam Brewster – heartbeat (7)

Choir and Gang vocals on "Today is the Day and "God You Reign"

- Derek Brandt, Jane Kopecky, Danny MacPhail, Chris Miller, Margie Ruiz, Jeffrey B. Scott, Shannon Scott and Sarah Sherratt

Ending voices on "God You Reign"

- Laura Brewster, Levi Brewster and Liam Brewster

Choir on "Give Him Praise"

- Sam Brown-Dawson, Charlene Carthen, Loren Ditmore, Chris Miller, Sandi Padilla, Teresa Perea, Margie Ruiz, Darnisha Taylor, Paul Woodruff

Gang vocals on "Salvation is Here" and "Let Your Glory Shine"

- Derek Brandt, Lincoln Brewster, David Carr, Tyler DeYoung, Adam Duncan, Trent Jenkins, Mike Johns, Pete Lugo, Danny MacPhail and Jeffrey B. Scott

=== Production ===
- Michael Coleman – executive producer
- Lincoln Brewster – producer, tracking engineer, mixing, ProTools editing
- Mike Johns – assistant producer, assistant engineer, mix assistant, ProTools editing
- Norm Stockton – assistant producer, assistant engineer
- Jeffrey B. Scott – assistant engineer
- Ken Love – mastering at MasterMix (Nashville, Tennessee)
- Jay King – A&R, artist development
- Jeff Quimby – A&R, artist development
- Rick Thompson – artist development coordination
- Anita Channell – production manager
- Shelia Crocker – production manager
- Benji Peck – art direction, package design
- Michael Gomez – photography

== Reception ==
Christianity Today's Russ Breimeier stated that "Today Is the Day" and "Everywhere I Go", the first two tracks of the album, were a "welcome return to form, even if the first two songs aren't the strongest way to start." He said that "Today Is the Day" was neither bad nor boring, but felt it was "on par with the average modern worship song." Russmeier compared the familiarity of "Today Is the Day" with the more experimental songs later in the eponymous album, praising Brewster's ability to experiment over his first few songs.

Breimeier noted the similarities in style between Brewster's "The Arms of My Savior" and John Mayer's Gravity, and between "This Love" and Mayer's Waiting on the World to Change. He also related the "bluesy gospel-rock" song "Give Him Praise" to Robert Randolph and the Family Band, praising it for its "thrilling and joyful" feel.
