= Justin Downer =

American basketball coach

Current position
- Title: Head coach
- Team: Point Loma Nazarene Sea Lions
- Conference: Pacific West Conference

Playing career
- 2011–2013: Skagit Valley College
- 2013–2015: Jessup

Coaching career (HC unless noted)
- 2015–2018: Riverside Poly HS (assistant)
- 2018–2019: Vanguard (assistant)
- 2019–2022: Cal Poly (assistant)
- 2022–2023: Point Loma (assistant)
- 2023–present: Point Loma

Head coaching record
- Overall: 77–21 (.786)
- Tournaments: 4–2 (NCAA Division II)

Accomplishments and honors

Championships
- 3 PacWest regular season (2024–2026); 2 PacWest tournament (2025, 2026)

Awards
- PacWest Coach of the Year (2025)

Justin Downer is an American college basketball coach who is the head coach of the Point Loma Nazarene Sea Lions men's basketball team.

== Early life and playing career ==
Downer began his college career at Skagit Valley College, where he played for two seasons before transferring Jessup University. He averaged 11.3 points per game as a junior.

== Coaching career ==
Downer began his coaching career as an assistant at Riverside Polytechnic High School and for the Under Armour West Coast Elite Amateur Athletic Union team. He became an assistant coach at Vanguard University in 2018. Downer left Vanguard after one season to take an assistant position at Cal Poly, San Luis Obispo.

Downer was hired as an assistant coach at Point Loma in 2022. He was promoted to head coach of the Sea Lions after one season.

== Head coaching record ==
Statistics overview
Season	Team	Overall	Conference	Standing	Postseason
Point Loma (Pacific West Conference) (2023–present)
2023–24	Point Loma	21–9	15–5	T–1st	
2024–25	Point Loma	29–6	18–2	1st	NCAA Division II Sweet 16
2025–26	Point Loma	27–6	18–4	1st	NCAA Division II Sweet 16
Point Loma:		77–21 (.786)	51–11 (.823)		
Total:		77–21 (.786)			
National champion Postseason invitational champion Conference regular season champion Conference regular season and conference tournament champion Division regular season champion Division regular season and conference tournament champion Conference tournament champion
