= Bell Shoals Baptist Church =

Coordinates: 27.9126°N 82.2700°W

Bell Shoals Church is a Baptist church located in Brandon, Florida. It is affiliated with the Southern Baptist Convention.

== History ==
Bell Shoals started in February 1961 when a group of 17 men met at Stowers Funeral Home. Shortly after, in March 1961, they acquired two acres (0.81 ha) of land to build their sanctuary, and 80 additional members joined.

As of 2018, there were 8,000 members and four other campuses. One of their campuses, Bell Shoals Baptist Apollo Beach, first started with 12 members, now has over 400 members.

In their community, Bell Shoals has partnered with Give 'em Heaven Ministries, Good Samaritan Mission, Manna on Wheels, Metropolitan Ministries, the Community Issues Council, Friends of Internationals, LifeCare Network, Tampa Port Ministries, Inc. and Workplace Paracletes.

The church also hosts concerts and large Christmas productions. In 2013, Bell Shoals hosted a concert featuring Natalie Grant and Sandi Patty. In December 2017, Bell Shoals hosted its annual Christmas production, which featured a 175-person choir and a 35-piece orchestra. In February 2018, Bell Shoals held a concert featuring American Idol finalists Scott MacIntyre and Jeremy Rosado to raise money to benefit victims of Hurricane Maria in Puerto Rico.

=== Politics ===
In 2007, protests gathered around Bell Shoals Baptist Church and accused the church of discriminating against gay men and women. Forrest Pollock, then pastor of the church, denied these claims and invited the people to attend church.

=== Senior Pastors, 1961-Present ===
Rev. Harry DeVane (September, 1961 - December 12, 1963)

Rev. James Leonard (January 8, 1964 - February, 1970)

Rev. Wilson Smith (August, 1970 - December, 1977)

Rev. Tim Wilson (June 18, 1978 - September 1986)

Dr. Robert (Bob) Reccord (June 1987 - August 26, 1992)

Dr. Ken Alford (October 17, 1993 - February 24, 2002)

Dr. Forrest Pollock (November 25, 2002 - May 12, 2008)

Dr. Stephen Rummage (July, 2009 - February 10, 2019)

Dr. Corey Abney (November 24, 2019 – Present)

== Campuses ==
Bell Shoals Church is a multi site church with several locations within the Tampa Bay area.

=== Current ===
Brandon

The Brandon Campus of Bell Shoals Church, established in 1961, is the church's first and largest location.

Español Brandon

In 2011, Bell Shoals began having services in Spanish out of the former worship center at the Brandon Campus.

Apollo Beach

Bell Shoals acquired Apollo Beach Community Church in October 2011 planting the Apollo Beach Campus.

Español Apollo Beach

A second Spanish speaking congregation is set to launch in the spring of 2024 in Apollo Beach FL.

Riverview

The campus in Riverview FL was first started in October 2016, closed in 2022, and relaunched in 2023 in a new location with a new campus pastor.

=== Former ===
- FishHawk Fellowship (now FishHawk Fellowship Church)
- East Bay (now Riverstone Church)

== Beliefs ==
https://bellshoals.com/beliefs/

Bell Shoals Church is a part of the Southern Baptist Convention and teaches the basic beliefs that members of this convention agree on. The reason that this church and its many campuses follow the Bible closely is because they believe the Bible was inspired by God. In other words, they believe God is the author of the Bible; man just wrote down God’s words. Like most other Christian denominations, this church teaches that there is only one God who is triune – God the Father, the Son and the Holy Spirit. They do, however, hold some unique beliefs that some members of other denominations do not:

- Salvation is a free gift from God to those who have faith, not to those who solely perform good works.
- Once someone has received salvation, it cannot be taken away from them.
- Only men can be pastors.
- Christians should submit their lives to God.
- There is sanctity in all human life.
- Church and state should be separate.
