= Josiah James =

American singer

- Born: Josiah James Meeker; Sacramento, California
- Origin: Cool, California
- Genres: Christian alternative rock, pop rock, indie rock
- Occupations: Singer, songwriter, guitarist, worship leader
- Instruments: vocals, guitar
- Years active: 2008–present
- Website: josiahjames.com

Josiah James Meeker, known professionally as Josiah James, is an American Christian musician and guitarist, who plays alternative rock, pop rock, and indie rock music. Meeker has released two full-length studio albums, The Morning Light (2009) and All Forgotten Things (2012). He has released Four extended plays, Oceans (2010), Heaven Came Down (2012), Identity (2014), and All That I’ve Become (2018).

== Early life ==
Josiah James Meeker was born in Sacramento, California. He became a songwriter at fourteen years-old, and started playing the guitar, while his parents owned and operated a local coffeehouse. He started full time touring, when he was just 18 years old.

== Career ==
His music recording career began in 2009, with the studio album, The Morning Light, that was independently released on April 25, 2009. He released two extended plays, Oceans on November 2, 2010, and Heaven Came Down on November 27, 2012, a Christmas-themed musical work. The next release was his second studio album, All Forgotten Things, that was released on January 6, 2012. He released, Identity, on May 13, 2014, which was his third extended play. Songs from Identity were covered by popular Christian musician Lincoln Brewster and band Audio Adrenaline, with fans taking the songs as their own works, respectively.

== Discography ==
=== Studio albums ===
- The Morning Light (2009)
- All Forgotten Things (2012)

=== Extended plays ===
- Oceans (2010)
- Heaven Came Down (2012)
- Identity (2014)
