= Lincoln Brewster (album) =

Studio album by Lincoln Brewster
- Released: 1999, April 21
- Studio: Sunset Blvd Studios, Phat Farm and RTC Studio (Franklin, Tennessee): Linc's house (Nashville, Tennessee); Linc's apartment (Modesto, California)
- Genre: Modern Worship
- Label: Vertical
- Producer: Lincoln Brewster: Paul Mills

Lincoln Brewster chronology
Lincoln Brewster (1999)	Live to Worship (2000)

Lincoln Brewster is the self-titled debut Christian worship music album by Lincoln Brewster released on April 21, 1999 by Vertical Music.

== Track listing ==
All tracks composed by Lincoln Brewster, except where indicated.

1. "He's All I Need" - 4:43
2. "Everybody Praise the Lord" - 4:12
3. "Hey God" - (Brewster, Daniel Rhinehart) - 3:55
4. "What Kind of Man" - 4:31
5. "Can't Deny" - 4:49
6. "Spin" - 2:35
7. "Shine" - 3:01
8. "On My Way" - 3:53
9. "Broken" - 4:41
10. "Walk On" - 5:01

== Personnel ==
- Lincoln Brewster – lead and backing vocals, keyboards, guitars, mandolin, bass (4)
- Blair Masters – keyboards, Hammond B3 organ
- Paul Mills – keyboards
- Craig Young – bass (1, 2, 5-9)
- Jimmie Lee Sloas – bass (3, 10)
- "Q" – drums, percussion
- Raymond Boyd – percussion

Gang vocals on "Everybody Praise the Lord"

- Lincoln Brewster, Darrel Corlew, David DeMarco and C.J. Hattlevig

=== Production ===
- Don Moen – executive producer
- Chris Thomason – executive producer
- Lincoln Brewster – producer, overdub recording, mixing
- Paul Mills – producer, track recording, overdub recording, mixing
- Matt Damico – Pro Tools tracking engineer
- Steve Dady – track recording assistant
- Jeff Pitzer – track recording assistant
- Craig Young – track recording assistant
- Josh Armstrong – overdub recording assistant
- Laura Brewster – overdub recording assistant
- Hank Williams – mastering at MasterMix (Nashville, Tennessee)
- Jimmy Abegg – photography
- Diana Lussenden – design
