= Amanda Lindsey Cook =

Canadian singer

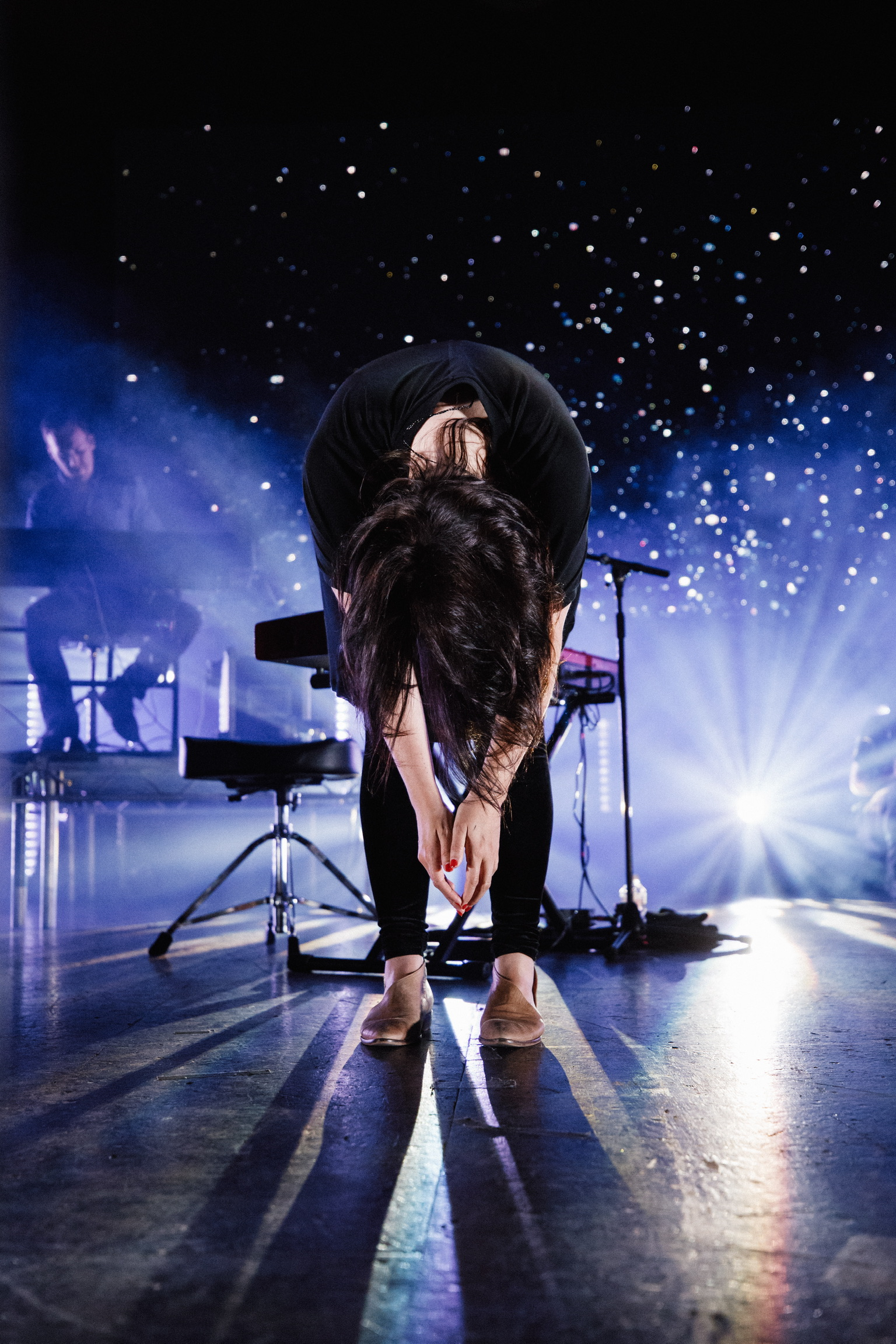
- Amanda Lindsey Cook leading with Bethel Music

Background information
- Also known as: Falcon
- Born: Amanda Lindsey Falk; May 8, 1984 (age 41)
- Origin: Niverville, Manitoba, Canada
- Genres: Contemporary Christian music, pop
- Occupations: Singer, songwriter
- Instruments: Vocals, piano
- Years active: 2003–present
- Labels: Avante; Signpost; Bethel; Provident Label Group
- Website: www.amandacook.co; hernameisfalcon.com

Amanda Lindsey Cook (born Amanda Falk; May 8, 1984), also known as Falcon (since 2020) is a Canadian singer, songwriter, and contemporary Christian music recording artist from Niverville, Manitoba. She received a Juno Award at the 2006 awards ceremony for her eponymous debut album. Cook has released three albums under her maiden name – Amanda Falk, Beautiful, and In Between the Now & Then.

In 2010, Cook joined the Bethel Music collective, and has since released two albums under Bethel – Brave New World and House on a Hill.

== Musical career ==
In 2004, Cook released her self-titled debut album, Amanda Falk, on Winnipeg label Avante Records. It was later released to the iTunes Store on May 30, 2006. The album received the 2006 Juno Award for the Contemporary Christian/Gospel Album of the Year.

Cook's second album Beautiful was released on October 23, 2007, on Avante Records. During this time she was also a part of the Beautiful Unique Girl Movement. Cook has also received a GMA Canada Covenant Award for Female Vocalist of the Year for four consecutive years, 2005 through 2008. On March 1, 2010, she released her third album In Between the Now & Then on the record label Signpost Music.

In 2014, Cook became a worship leader at Bethel Church in Redding, California, joining the Bethel music collective, Bethel Music. She has appeared on many Bethel Music albums since then.

On September 25, 2015, Cook released her first studio album Brave New World through Bethel Music under the new name "Amanda Lindsey Cook". The album received the Inspirational Album of the Year award at the 2016 GMA Dove Awards. On March 29, 2019, Cook released her second album under Bethel Music, House on a Hill.

In an interview to Soul Shine Magazine, she said that she is musically influenced by Sarah McLachlan, Nichole Nordeman, Norah Jones, and John Mayer.

On August 21, 2020, Cook released a single titled "I'll Admit It", as the debut single from her pop music project under the name "Falcon". Two weeks later, on September 4, 2020, Cook released her second single as Falcon, titled "Young Love", alongside a music video. On September 18, 2020, "The Good Stuff" was released as Cook's third Falcon single, with a music video. On October 13, 2020, Cook announced that Nova, her debut studio album as Falcon, would be released on October 16, 2020.

== Discography ==
=== Albums ===
List of albums, with selected chart positions
Title	Album details	Peak chart positions					Sales
Title	Album details	CAN	UK	UK C&G	US	US Christ.	Sales
Amanda Falk	Credited as Amanda Falk; Released: May 30, 2006; Label: Avante; Format: CD, digital download, streaming	—	—	—	—	—	
Beautiful	Credited as Amanda Falk; Released: October 23, 2007; Label: Avante; Format: CD, digital download, streaming	—	—	—	—	—	
In Between the Now & Then	Credited as Amanda Falk; Released: March 1, 2010; Label: Signpost Music, Ltd.; Format: CD, digital download, streaming	—	—	—	—	—	
Brave New World	Credited as Amanda Cook; Released: September 25, 2015; Label: Bethel Music; Format: CD, digital download, streaming	18	93	1	20	1	US: 19,000
House on a Hill	Credited as Amanda Lindsey Cook; Released: March 29, 2019; Label: Bethel Music; Format: CD, digital download, streaming	—	—	4	—	6	
Nova	Credited as Falcon; Released: October 16, 2020; Label: Provident; Format: CD, digital download, streaming	—	—	—	—	—	
Nova (Piano Sessions)	Credited as Falcon; Released: May 14, 2021; Label: Provident; Format: CD, digital download, streaming	—	—	—	—	—	
State of the Union	Credited as Amanda Cook; Released: May 20, 2022; Label: Provident; Format: CD, digital download, streaming	—	—	—	—	—	
SURVEY: Part 1	Credited as Amanda Cook; Released 2023	—	—	—	—	—	
SURVEY: Part 2, Live at St. John at Hackney	Credited as Amanda Cook; Released 2025	—	—	—	—	—	
"—" denotes a recording that did not chart or was not released in that territory.

=== Singles ===
==== As lead artist ====
List of singles and peak chart positions
Single	Year	Peak chart positions			Certifications	Album
Single	Year	US Christ	US Christ Air.	US Christ Digital	Certifications	Album
"You Make Me Brave" (with Bethel Music)	2014	16	20	13	RIAA: Gold	You Make Me Brave: Live at the Civic
"Heroes"	2015	—	—	43		Brave New World
"Awakening"	2019	32	—	15		House on a Hill
"Still"	2019	—	—	—		non-album single
"Evergreen Reimagined"	2019	—	—	—		non-album single
"Help Is On the Way"	2020	—	—	—		non-album single
"I'll Admit It" (as Falcon)	2020	—	—	—		Nova
"Young Love" (as Falcon)	2020	—	—	—		Nova
"The Good Stuff" (as Falcon)	2020	—	—	—		Nova
"While We Wait"	2022	—	—	—		State of the Union
"There's Nothing"	2023	-	-	-		SURVEY: Part 1
"Light of Your Love (Subjects)" (Young Oceans; Amanda Cook)	2022	-	-	-		Non- Album single
"—" denotes a recording that did not chart or was not released in that territory.

==== As featured artist ====
Year	Title	Album
2018	"Sails" (Pat Barrett featuring Steffany Gretzinger & Amanda Lindsey Cook)	Pat Barrett
2020	"Be Alright" (Dante Bowe featuring Amanda Lindsey Cook)	non-album single

=== Other charted songs ===
==== As lead artist ====
List of songs and peak chart positions
Song	Year	Peak chart positions		Album
Song	Year	US Christ	US Christ Digital	Album
"You Don't Miss a Thing" (with Bethel Music)	2015	35	38	We Will Not Be Shaken (Live)
"Pieces"	2015	—	36	Brave New World
"Mercy" (with Bethel Music)	2016	47	49	Have It All
"Starlight" (with Bethel Music)	2017	32	18	Starlight
"Extravagant" (with Bethel Music)	2017	30	23	Starlight
"—" denotes a recording that did not chart.

==== As a featured artist ====
List of songs and peak chart positions
Song	Year	Peak chart positions	Album
Song	Year	US Christ	Album
"Before and After" (Elevation Worship and Maverick City Music Featuring Amanda Lindsey Cook)	2021	34	Old Church Basement

=== Other appearances ===
Year	Song	Album
2011	"I Will Exalt" (with Bethel Music)	Be Lifted High
2014	"Shepherd" (with Bethel Music)	You Make Me Brave: Live at the Civic
2014	"Wonder (Spontaneous)" (with Bethel Music)	You Make Me Brave: Live at the Civic
2014	"Steady Heart" (Steffany Gretzinger featuring Amanda Cook)	The Undoing
2015	"The Love You Have For Me" (Sean Feucht featuring Amanda Cook)	Victorious One - Live at Bethel
2017	"Breathe (Spontaneous)" (with Bethel Music)	Starlight
2017	"You Came (Lazarus)" (with Bethel Music)	Starlight
2017	"Undivided" (Stu Garrard featuring Amanda Cook)	Beatitudes
2018	"Pieces (Spontaneous)" (with Bethel Music)	Moments: Mighty Sound
2018	"To the End" (Mack Brock featuring Amanda Cook)	Greater Things
2018	"You & Me" (William Matthews featuring Amanda Cook and Trip Lee)	Kosmos
2018	"Sails" (Pat Barrett featuring Amanda Cook & Steffany Gretzinger)	Pat Barrett
2020	"Christ the Lord Is with Me" (Steffany Gretzinger featuring Amanda Lindsey Cook & Wonder Grace Gretzinger)	Forever Amen
2020	"King of My Heart" (with Bethel Music)	Peace
2020	"Lean Back" (Maverick City Music featuring Amanda Lindsey Cook and Chandler Moore)	Maverick City Vol. 3 Part 1
2020	"Closer" (Maverick City Music featuring Amanda Lindsey Cook)	Maverick City Vol. 3 Part 1
2020	"Spotlight" (Rita Springer featuring Amanda Lindsey Cook)	Light
2020	"Temple (Spontaneous)" (Maverick City Music featuring Amanda Lindsey Cook)	Maverick City, Vol. 3 Pt. 2
2020	"Space (Live)" (Mack Brock featuring Amanda Lindsey Cook)	Space
2021	"Starts and Ends (Live)" (Hillsong United featuring Amanda Lindsey Cook)	The People Tour: Live from Madison Square Garden
2021	"The Getting Through" (Judah. featuring Amanda Lindsey Cook)	7 album
2021	"Closer Than Your Next Breath" (Moriah featuring Amanda Cook)	Live from the Quarry
2022	"If It Wasn't for Jesus (Spontaneous)" (Tribl and Maverick City Music featuring Amanda Cook)	Tribl Nights Anthologies
2022	"Names (He Shall Reign)" (Tribl and Maverick City Music featuring Amanda Cook)	Tribl Nights Anthologies
2022	"So Close" (Brandon Lake featuring Amanda Cook)	Help!
2023	"There's Nothing"	SURVEY: Part 1

Songs on compilations

- 27th Annual Covenant Hits, "Broken" (CMC, 2006)
- 28th Annual Covenant Hits, "Endless" (CMC, 2007)
- GMA Canada presents 30th Anniversary Collection, "Small" (CMC, 2008)

== Awards and recognition ==
Gospel Music Association Canada Covenant Awards

Year	Nominee / work	Award	Result
2005	Herself	Female Vocalist of the Year	Won
2006	Herself	Female Vocalist of the Year	Won
2007	Herself	Female Vocalist of the Year	Won
2008	Herself	Female Vocalist of the Year	Won
2008	"Beautiful" (co-written with Malynda Zacharias and Marshall Zacharias)^{[a]}	Pop/Contemporary Song of the Year	Won
2010	Herself	Female Vocalist of the Year	Nominated
2010	In Between the Now & Then	Pop/Contemporary Album of the Year	Nominated
2010	"Song For Matthew"	Inspirational Song of the Year	Nominated
2014	Herself	Female Vocalist of the Year	Won
2014	"You Make Me Brave"	Song of the Year	Won
2014	"You Make Me Brave"	Praise & Worship Song of the Year	Won

Juno Awards

Year	Nominee / work	Award	Result
2006	Amanda Falk	Contemporary Christian/Gospel Album of the Year	Won
2008	Beautiful	Contemporary Christian/Gospel Album of the Year	Nominated
2016	Brave New World	Contemporary Christian/Gospel Album of the Year	Nominated

Shai Awards (formerly The Vibe Awards)

Year	Nominee / work	Award	Result
2005	Herself	New Artist of the Year	Won
2005	Herself	Female Vocalist of the Year	Nominated
2007	Herself	Female Vocalist of the Year	Nominated

Western Canadian Music Awards

Year	Nominee / work	Award	Result
2005	Amanda Falk	Outstanding Christian Recording	Won
2010	In Between the Now & Then	Contemporary Christian/Gospel Recording of the Year	Nominated

GMA Dove Awards

Year	Nominee / work	Award	Result
2016	Brave New World	Inspirational Album of the Year	Won
2016	"Pieces"	Inspirational Song of the Year	Nominated
2019	Awakening	Short Form Video of the Year	Nominated

== See also ==
- Music of Canada
- List of Canadian musicians

== Notes ==
- ^{[a]} Cook was also nominated for 2008 GMAC Awards in the categories of Album of the Year: Beautiful, Pop/Contemporary Album of the Year: Beautiful, and Song of the Year: "Beautiful".
