= Central Church (Henderson, Nevada) =

- Central
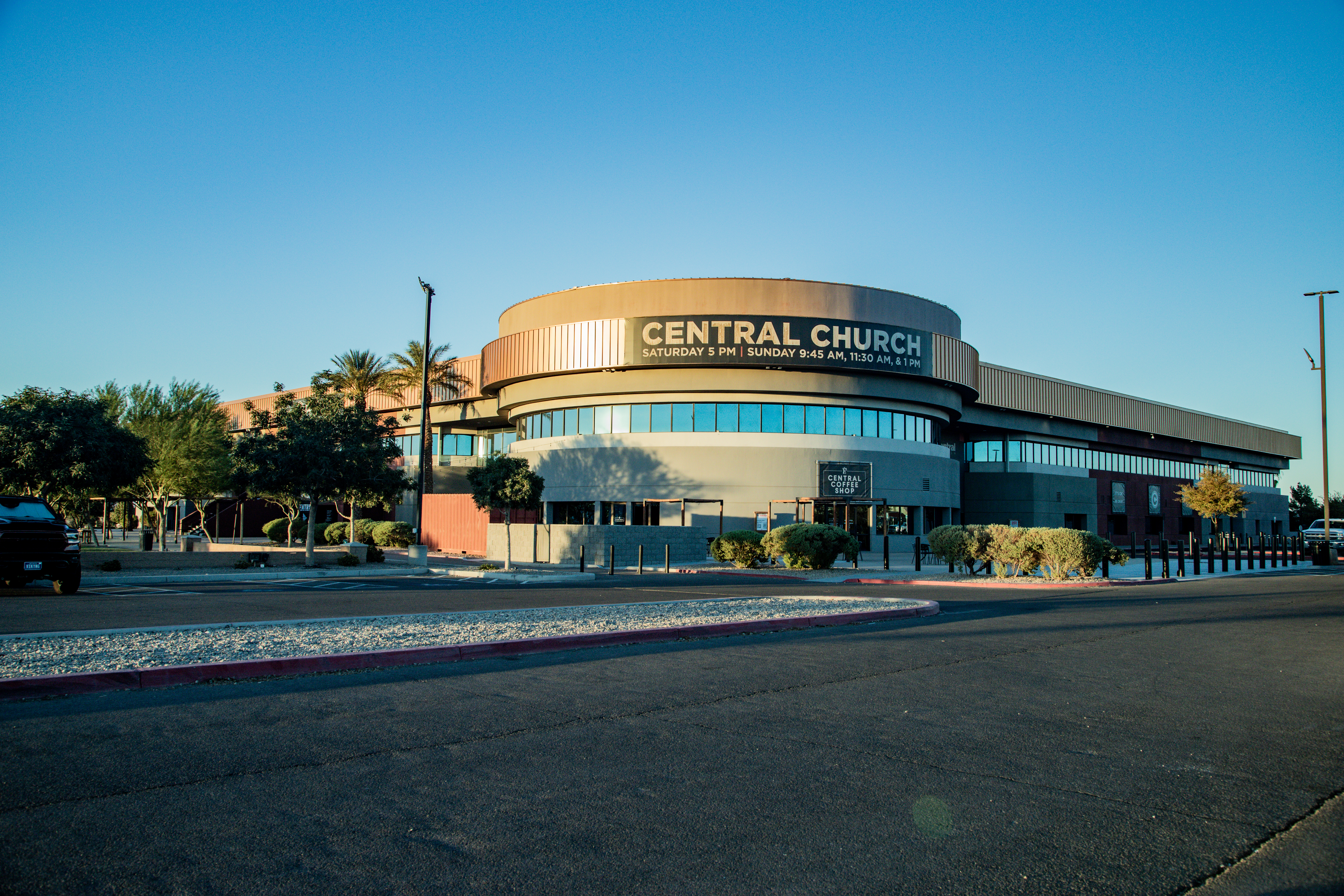
- Central Church
- 36°4′50″N 115°2′17″W
- Location: Henderson, Nevada
- Country: United States
- Denomination: non-denominational
- Churchmanship: Evangelical
- Website: www.centralchurch.online

History
- Founded: 1962

Central Church (also called Central Christian Church and Central) is a non-denominational Evangelical Christian megachurch based in Henderson, Nevada, United States. Originally founded in 1962, the church has seven physical locations in total with approximately 21,055 weekly visitors as of 2018.

== Locations ==
The church has a total of seven locations, four of which are in the Las Vegas Valley, including its headquarters in Henderson as well as in the master-planned communities of Summerlin in Las Vegas, Aliante in North Las Vegas, and the unincorporated town of Sunrise Manor.

Outside of Nevada, there is a location in Kingman, Arizona and Gulf Breeze, Florida as well as a location in Morelia in the Mexican state of Michoacán. The church offers a Spanish-language service at its main location in Henderson and broadcasts its services live on the internet.

== History ==
Central Church was founded in 1962. In 1999, the church moved into its current headquarters built on 56 acres (23 ha) in Henderson with the interior being 148,000 square feet (13,700 m^{2}) building in Henderson, Nevada.

In 2013, Outreach listed Central as the 9th largest church in the United States with an attendance of 21,055. Jud Wilhite is the senior pastor of Central. In November 2018, CBS News listed Central Church as the 13th largest megachurch in the United States with about 21,055 weekly visitors.

== See also ==
- List of megachurches in the United States
