= Bayside Church (Sacramento region) =

Family of churches in California, United States

Coordinates: 38.7476°N 121.225°W

- Bayside Church
- Location: Roseville, California
- Country: United States
- Denomination: Evangelicalism
- Website: granitebay.baysideonline.com

History
- Status: Active
- Founded: 1995

Bayside Church, formally known as Bayside Covenant Church, is a family of churches and venues centered on its primary campus in Granite Bay, California, United States, which is referred to as the Granite Bay campus. The church is led by Senior Pastor Ray Johnston, Teaching Pastor Curt Harlow and Mark Clark. John Jackson, the former executive pastor at Bayside, became the president of William Jessup University on March 23, 2011. Bayside is one of the largest churches in the Sacramento metropolitan area. It is affiliated with the Evangelical Covenant Church.

== History ==
Bayside traces its informal beginnings to 1994, following the suicides of a few local teenagers. Worried that the community didn't have resources available to serve troubled youth, a group of parents joined to pray for help. The group soon increased to 164 people and moved to the Granite Bay Tennis Club. An elementary school and high school also housed parishioners before Bayside Church built a permanent facility on 34.6 acres of land on Sierra College Boulevard in 2004.

Sherwood Carthen, founding pastor of Bayside of South Sacramento (January 1, 2005) and chaplain of the Sacramento Kings, died suddenly on September 25, 2013.

In an event called CPR Saturday, American Red Cross volunteers gave cardiopulmonary resuscitation (CPR) lessons for free at Bayside, where completion of the program granted an American Red Cross CPR year-long certification. Nearly 500 people were expected to attend.

Between April and May 2010, the church hosted an exhibit including portions of the Dead Sea Scrolls that were obtained by Azusa Pacific University in 2009, as well as historical Bibles and other Christian works.

Bayside hosted over one thousand worship leaders, musicians, songwriters, pastors, technicians, and artists at the Thriving Musician Summit in mid-September 2010. The church featured artists Matt Redman, Paul Baloche, Lincoln Brewster, and Phil Keaggy.

Bayside rented the Power Balance Pavilion during the Easter of 2011, attracting a crowd of 17,000 people.

Bayside collaborated with local businesses, to raise money for the relief effort involved with alleviating the devastation caused by the 2011 Tōhoku earthquake and tsunami.

== Programs ==
Bayside has a ministry that caters to special-needs children.

Every year, Bayside hosts a several week-long festival for children called Breakaway. The day camp's activities, which include water games and arts and crafts, attracts around 4,000 children annually.

Bayside's High School Ministry is called Unleashed at the Granite Bay campus, which meets on Wednesday nights. Bayside's Outreach organizes trip to impoverished areas of the Mexicali region of Baja California every year during Spring Break on a mission trip. On the 2014 trip, 1,200 teenagers and adults were involved. The team recorded a YouTube video of the trip called "Mexico 2014 (We're Going Down)".

Every month, Bayside sends twenty volunteers to have a picnic at the Serna Village, an apartment complex that supports dozens of otherwise-homeless families.
